= 2018 NCAA Division I women's soccer season =

NCAA Division I women's soccer
- Season: 2018
- Champions: Florida State (2nd title)

The 2018 NCAA Division I women's soccer season was the 37th season of NCAA women's college soccer. The Stanford Cardinal were defending national champions.

== Preseason ==
=== Coaching changes ===
Program	Outgoing coach	Manner of departure	Date of vacancy	Incoming coach	Date of appointment
Army	Marcia McDermott	mutually parted ways	October 30, 2017	Adrian Blewitt	December 6, 2017
Austin Peay	Kelley Guth	Resigned	November 8, 2017	Naomi Kolarova	December 21, 2017
Cal State Bakersfield	Gary Curneen	Resigned	January 5, 2018	Sebastian Vecchio	February 20, 2018
Connecticut	Len Tsantiris	Retired	November 7, 2017	Margaret Rodriguez	January 2, 2018
East Carolina	Rob Donnenwirth	Resigned	November 9, 2017	Jason Hamilton	December 11, 2017
Eastern Illinois	Kiki Lara	unknown	unknown	Jake Plant	February 2018
Elon	Chris Neal	Resigned	January 19, 2018	Neil Payne	February 22, 2018
Fairfield	Jim O'Brien	Resigned	November 17, 2017	David Barrett	January 16, 2018
George Washington	Sarah Barnes	to Miami (FL)	February 27, 2018	Michelle Demko	April 13, 2018
Green Bay Phoenix	Kimberly Brandão	unknown	unknown	Wojtek Krakowiak (interim)	July 2018
Hampton	Frank Hughes	unknown	unknown	Kevin Darcy	July 26, 2018
High Point	Marty Beall	to Richmond	December 21, 2017	Brandi Fontaine	February 5, 2018
Idaho	Derek Pittman	to UTSA	May 7, 2018	Jeremy Clevenger	July 11, 2018
Incarnate Word	Anne Felts	Resigned	October 31, 2017	Emma Wright-Cates	December 8, 2017
Jacksonville	Brian Copham	Fired	April 24, 2018	Laura Kane	May 30, 2018
James Madison	Dave Lombardo	Retired	November 29, 2017	Joshua Walters	February 2, 2018
Little Rock	Adrian Blewitt	to Army	December 6, 2017	Mark Foster	January 16, 2018
Marist	Gene Smith	Resigned	November 8, 2017	Leigh Howard	January 11, 2018
Miami (FL)	Mary-Frances Monroe	Fired	January 15, 2018	Sarah Barnes	February 27, 2018
Miami (OH)	Bobby Kramig	Resigned	August 4, 2017	Courtney Sirmans	December 18, 2017
Michigan	Greg Ryan	Fired	January 25, 2018	Jennifer Klein	February 28, 2018
Montana	Mark Plakorus	Resigned	January 30, 2018	Chris Citowicki	May 7, 2018
Mount St. Mary's	Joe Nemzer	to Sky Blue FC	January 25, 2018	Tori Krause	March 13, 2018
Murray State	Jeremy Groves	to Mississippi State	January 8, 2018	Matt Lodge	January 24, 2018
New Mexico State	Freddy Delgado	Fired	November 5, 2017	Rob Baarts	January 5, 2018
North Dakota State	Mark Cook	Resigned	November 28, 2017	Michael Regan	January 19, 2018
Northern Illinois	John Ross	unknown	unknown	Julie Colhoff	March 8, 2018
Northwestern State	George Van Linder	Resigned	November 9, 2017	Jess Jobe & Anna Jobe	December 19, 2017
Notre Dame	Theresa Romagnolo	Resigned	January 22, 2018	Nate Norman	February 20, 2018
Pittsburgh	Greg Miller	Fired	November 3, 2017	Randy Waldrum	December 19, 2017
Portland	Garrett Smith	Fired	November 7, 2017	Michelle French	December 15, 2017
Richmond	Peter Albright	Resigned	November 8, 2017	Marty Beall	December 21, 2017
Sacred Heart	Kim Banner	unknown	February 27, 2018	Matt Micros	April 9, 2018
South Dakota	Mandy Green	Fired	November 1, 2017	Michael Thomas	December 12, 2017
UMass	Ed Matz	Fired	November 6, 2017	Jason Dowiak	December 19, 2017
UMass Lowell	Francesco D'Agostino	Resigned	June 13, 2018	Mira Novak (interim)	July 26, 2018
UMBC	Leslie Wray	Fired	November 16, 2017	Vanessa Mann	January 19, 2018
UNC Asheville	Michelle Demko	to George Washington	April 13, 2018	Lindsay Vera	May 22, 2018
UNC Wilmington	Paul Cairney	discontinued from the university	June 20, 2018	Chris Neal	July 3, 2018
UTSA	Greg Sheen	to Washington State	February 27, 2018	Derek Pittman	May 7, 2018
Western Michigan	Lauren Sinacola	to Notre Dame	April 19, 2018	Sarah Stanczyk	July 13, 2018
William & Mary	John Daly	Retired	November 10, 2017	Julie Cunningham Shackford	December 12, 2017
Wofford	Amy Kiah	Resigned	June 26, 2018	Eric Lewis (interim)	July 19, 2018
Youngstown State	Fabio Boateng	Resigned	November 7, 2017	Brian Shrum	December 5, 2017

=== Conference realignment ===
Six schools joined new conferences this season. Four moved their entire athletic programs to new conferences, two NCAA Division II members that sponsor women's soccer announced during the 2016–17 offseason that they would upgrade their athletic programs to Division I effective in 2018, and one began play in its current all-sports league. One conference announced that it would no longer use divisions for its women's soccer seasonal competition.

Program	Old Conference	New Conference	Reference
California Baptist	NCAA Division II	WAC	
Hampton	None	Big South	
Liberty	Big South	ASUN	
North Alabama	NCAA Division II	ASUN	
North Dakota	Big Sky	Summit	
USC Upsate	ASUN	Big South	

The Mid-American Conference previously divided its teams into an East and West Division. However, in 2018 the league discontinued this and all teams were considered to be in one division.

== Season Overview ==
=== Polls ===
==== Pre-season polls ====
United Soccer Coaches
Rank	Team
1	Stanford
2	UCLA
3	Duke
4	Penn State
5	South Carolina
6	North Carolina
7	Florida
8	Virginia
9	West Virginia
10	Florida State
11	Texas A&M
12	USC
13	Princeton
14	Notre Dame
15	Baylor
16	UCF
17	Texas
18	Pepperdine
19	Santa Clara
20	NC State
21	Washington State
22	Georgetown
23	Ohio State
24	Rutgers
25	Tennessee

Top Drawer Soccer
Rank	Team
1	Stanford
2	UCLA
3	North Carolina
4	Florida
5	Virginia
6	Penn State
7	Duke
8	South Carolina
9	Florida State
10	Texas A&M
11	USC
12	Princeton
13	West Virginia
14	Santa Clara
15	UCF
16	NC State
17	Tennessee
18	USF
19	Notre Dame
20	Oklahoma State
21	Arizona
22	Baylor
23	Pepperdine
24	Texas
25	Washington State

Soccer America
Rank	Team
1	Stanford
2	UCLA
3	Penn State
4	North Carolina
5	Florida
6	Florida State
7	Virginia
8	West Virginia
9	USC
10	Duke
11	Princeton
12	Baylor
13	Texas A&M
14	South Carolina
15	Georgetown
16	California
17	Santa Clara
18	NC State
19	Tennessee
20	UCF
21	Notre Dame
22	Pepperdine
23	Texas
24	Washington State
25	Oklahoma State

=== Major upsets ===
Games won by a team ranked 10 or more spots lower or an unranked squad that defeats a team ranked No. 15 or higher are considered "major upsets". United Soccer Coaches rankings are used for this list.

Date	Winner	Score	Loser
August 17, 2018	Albany	1–0	No. 21 Arizona
August 18, 2018	Illinois	2–1	No. 3 Duke
August 26, 2018	No. 23 Oklahoma State	1–0	No. 5 Florida
August 26, 2018	Illinois	2–1	No. 14 Oklahoma State
September 2, 2018	Wake Forest	1–0	No. 5 Penn State
September 16, 2018	Minnesota	2–0	No. 12 Northwestern
September 20, 2018	Arkansas	3–2	No. 2 Texas A&M
September 20, 2018	Clemson	1–0 (2 OT)	No. 4 Virginia
September 20, 2018	Mississippi State	2–1	No. 13 South Carolina
September 23, 2018	Ole Miss	3–2	No. 9 Auburn
September 23, 2018	Boston College	2–1	No. 7 Florida State
September 27, 2018	Virginia Tech	1–0	No. 6 Virginia
September 27, 2018	Wake Forest	2–1	No. 11 Boston College
September 20, 2018	Oklahoma	2–1	No. 12 Oklahoma State
October 4, 2018	Clemson	1–0	No. 10 Florida State
October 7, 2018	Maryland	2–1	No. 14 Northwestern
October 7, 2018	Pepperdine	1–0	No. 4 Santa Clara
October 7, 2018	Utah	1–0	No. 7 Washington State
October 7, 2018	No. 19 Vanderbilt	3–1	No. 9 Tennessee
October 11, 2018	UCF	1–0	No. 15 Memphis
October 14, 2018	USF	2–0	No. 15 Memphis
October 19, 2018	Alabama	1–0	No. 5 Texas A&M
October 21, 2018	No. 18 Tennessee	4–0	No. 5 Texas A&M
October 21, 2018	LSU	4–0	No. 7 South Carolina
October 25, 2018	Kansas	1–0 (OT)	No. 13 West Virginia
October 25, 2018	Ole Miss	1–0	No. 7 Vanderbilt
October 27, 2018	BYU	2–0	No. 6 Santa Clara

=== Award winners ===
==== Players of the Week ====
Week	Player	Position	Team
1	(United States) CeCe Kizer	MF	Ole Miss
2	(United States) Cyera Hintzen	FW	Texas
3	(United States) Nonie Frishette	GK	Wake Forest
4	(United States) Melissa Weck	GK	Florida Gulf Coast
5	(United States) Mikayla Krzeczowski	GK	South Carolina
6	(United States) Chelsee Washington	MF	Bowling Green
7	(United States) Raimee Sherle	FW	Boise State
8	(United States) Sam Coffey	MF	Boston College
9	(Canada) Evelyne Viens	FW	South Florida
10	(Venezuela) Deyna Castellanos	FW	Florida State
11	(Jamaica) Atlanta Primus	FW	Cal State Fullerton

=== Conference winners and tournaments ===
Conference	Regular Season Champion(s)	Tournament Winner	Conference Tournament	Tournament Dates	Tournament Venue (City)
America East	Stony Brook (Note: 1. 1 seed in conference tournament); Hartford	Albany	2018 Tournament	Oct. 25 - Nov. 4	Campus sites, hosted by higher seed
American	South Florida	Memphis	2018 Tournament	Oct. 31 - Nov. 4	Corbett Soccer Stadium • Tampa, Florida
Atlantic 10	Saint Louis		2018 Tournament	Oct. 27 - Nov. 4	Quarterfinals: Campus sites, hosted by higher seed Semi-finals and Final: Baujan Field • Dayton, Ohio
ACC	North Carolina	Florida State	2018 Tournament	Oct. 28 - Nov. 4	Quarterfinals: Campus sites, hosted by higher seed Semi-finals and Final: Sahlen's Stadium • Cary, North Carolina
Atlantic Sun	Lipscomb		2018 Tournament	Oct. 26 – Nov. 3	Campus sites, hosted by higher seed
Big 12	Baylor	West Virginia	2018 Tournament	Oct. 28 – Nov. 4	Children's Mercy Victory Field • Kansas City, Missouri
Big East	Georgetown		2018 Tournament	Oct. 28 – Nov. 4	Campus sites, hosted by higher seed
Big Sky	Weber State	Montana	2018 Tournament	Oct. 31 – Nov. 4	Wildcat Soccer Field • Ogden, Utah
Big South	Radford		2018 Tournament	Oct. 26 – Nov. 4	Quarterfinals: Campus sites, hosted by higher seed Semi-finals and Final: Sportsplex at Matthews • Matthews, North Carolina
Big Ten	Penn St	Minnesota	2018 Tournament	Oct. 28 – Nov. 4	Quarterfinals: Campus sites, hosted by higher seed Semi-finals and Final: Grand Park • Westfield, Indiana
Big West	Long Beach State		2018 Tournament	Nov. 1 – Nov. 4	Anteater Stadium • Irvine, California
CAA	James Madison	Hofstra	2018 Tournament	Oct. 26 – Nov. 3	Campus sites, hosted by higher seed
C-USA	North Texas		2018 Tournament	Oct 31. – Nov. 4	Old Dominion Soccer Complex • Norfolk, Virginia
Horizon	Milwaukee		2018 Tournament	Oct. 29 – Nov. 3	Quarterfinals: Campus sites, hosted by higher seed Semi-finals and Final: Engelmann Stadium • Milwaukee, Wisconsin
Ivy	Princeton	No Tournament			
MAAC	Monmouth		2018 Tournament	Oct. 28 – Nov. 4	Campus sites, hosted by higher seed
MAC	Bowling Green		2018 Tournament	Oct. 28 – Nov. 4	Quarterfinals: Campus sites, hosted by higher seed Semi-finals and Final: Mickey Cochrane Stadium • Bowling Green, Ohio
Missouri Valley	Loyola		2018 Tournament	Oct. 28 – Nov. 4	Quarterfinals: Campus sites, hosted by higher seed Semi-finals and Final: Loyola Soccer Park • Chicago, Illinois
Mountain West	Boise State	San Jose State	2018 Tournament	Oct. 30 – Nov. 3	Spartan Soccer Complex • San Jose, CA
Northeast	Central Connecticut		2018 Tournament	Nov. 2 – Nov. 4	Central Connecticut Soccer Field • New Britain, Connecticut
Ohio Valley	UT Martin	Murray State	2018 Tournament	Oct. 26 – Nov. 4	First Round and Quarterfinals: Campus sites, hosted by higher seed Semi-finals and Final: Skyhawk Soccer Field • Martin, Tennessee
Pac-12	Stanford	No Tournament			
Patriot	Boston University		2018 Tournament	Oct. 30 – Nov. 4	Quarterfinals: Campus sites, hosted by higher seed Semi-finals and Final: Nickerson Field • Boston, Massachusetts
SEC	Vanderbilt	LSU	2018 Tournament	Oct. 28 – Nov. 4	Orange Beach Sportsplex • Orange Beach, Alabama
SoCon	Samford	UNC Greensboro	2018 Tournament	Oct. 24 – Nov. 4	First Round and Quarterfinals: Campus sites, hosted by higher seed Semi-finals and Final: Betts Stadium • Macon, Georgia
Southland	Central Arkansas	Abilene Christian	2018 Tournament	Oct. 31 - Nov. 4	Lamar Soccer Complex • Beaumont, TX
The Summit	Denver; South Dakota St	Denver	2018 Tournament	Nov. 1 – Nov. 3	Fishback Soccer Park • Brookings, South Dakota
Sun Belt	Texas State	Little Rock	2018 Tournament	Oct. 31 – Nov. 4	Foley Sports Complex • Foley, Alabama
SWAC	Grambling State	Howard	2018 Tournament	Nov. 1 – Nov. 4	Prairie View A&M Athletic Complex • Prairie View, Texas
WCC	BYU	No Tournament			
WAC	UMKC	Seattle	2018 Tournament	Oct. 31 – Nov. 4	Clyde Field • Orem, UT

== Conference standings ==
2018 American Athletic Conference women's soccer standings
	Conf.						Overall
Team	W		L		T	PCT	W		L		T	PCT
No. 19 South Florida ‍†‍‍^{y}	8	–	1	–	0	.889	15	–	4	–	0	.789
No. 23 Memphis ‍‍‡‍^{y}	7	–	2	–	0	.778	17	–	4	–	0	.810
UCF ‍‍‍	6	–	3	–	0	.667	10	–	7	–	1	.583
East Carolina ‍‍‍	5	–	4	–	0	.556	10	–	6	–	3	.605
SMU ‍‍‍	5	–	4	–	0	.556	10	–	6	–	2	.611
Temple ‍‍‍	3	–	5	–	1	.389	7	–	11	–	1	.395
Houston ‍‍‍	3	–	5	–	1	.389	7	–	10	–	2	.421
Tulsa ‍‍‍	3	–	6	–	0	.333	7	–	10	–	1	.417
Connecticut ‍‍‍	2	–	7	–	0	.222	4	–	14	–	0	.222
Cincinnati ‍‍‍	1	–	6	–	2	.222	6	–	9	–	3	.417
† – Conference champion ‡ – 2018 AAC Tournament champion y – Invited to the NCAA tournament As of December 4, 2018; Rankings from United Soccer Coaches Poll; Source:American Athletic Conference

2018 America East Conference women's soccer standings
	Conf.						Overall
Team	W		L		T	PCT	W		L		T	PCT
Stony Brook ‍†‍‍	6	–	1	–	1	.813	11	–	7	–	1	.605
Hartford ‍†‍‍	6	–	1	–	1	.813	13	–	3	–	2	.778
Albany ‍‍‡‍^{y}	5	–	2	–	1	.688	13	–	6	–	2	.667
UMass Lowell ‍‍‍	4	–	3	–	1	.563	8	–	8	–	4	.500
Vermont ‍‍‍	4	–	3	–	1	.563	6	–	9	–	3	.417
New Hampshire ‍‍‍	3	–	4	–	1	.438	7	–	9	–	2	.444
Binghamton ‍‍‍	2	–	6	–	0	.250	7	–	9	–	2	.444
Maine ‍‍‍	2	–	6	–	0	.250	6	–	9	–	1	.406
UMBC ‍‍‍	1	–	7	–	0	.125	2	–	15	–	0	.118
† – Conference champion ‡ – 2018 America East Tournament champion y – Invited to the NCAA Tournament; As of November 7, 2018; Rankings from United Soccer Coaches Poll; Source:America East Conference

2018 Atlantic 10 Conference women's soccer standings
	Conf.						Overall
Team	W		L		T	PCT	W		L		T	PCT
Saint Louis ‍†‍‡‍^{y}	10	–	0	–	0	1.000	18	–	3	–	1	.841
VCU ‍‍‍	9	–	1	–	0	.900	16	–	4	–	0	.800
Saint Joseph's ‍‍‍	8	–	2	–	0	.800	14	–	5	–	2	.714
George Mason ‍‍‍	8	–	2	–	0	.800	14	–	6	–	0	.700
UMass ‍‍‍	6	–	3	–	1	.650	11	–	6	–	1	.639
Fordham ‍‍‍	6	–	3	–	1	.650	9	–	9	–	1	.500
George Washington ‍‍‍	6	–	4	–	0	.600	10	–	8	–	1	.553
Dayton ‍‍‍	4	–	5	–	1	.450	8	–	9	–	2	.474
LaSalle ‍‍‍	3	–	7	–	0	.300	8	–	8	–	1	.500
Duquesne ‍‍‍	2	–	6	–	2	.300	6	–	9	–	2	.412
Richmond ‍‍‍	2	–	7	–	1	.250	2	–	15	–	1	.139
St. Bonaventure ‍‍‍	2	–	8	–	0	.200	2	–	13	–	4	.211
Davidson ‍‍‍	0	–	9	–	1	.050	2	–	14	–	1	.147
Rhode Island ‍‍‍	0	–	9	–	1	.050	0	–	17	–	1	.028
† – Conference champion ‡ – 2018 Atlantic 10 Tournament champion y – Invited to the NCAA tournament As of October 25, 2018; Rankings from United Soccer Coaches Poll; Source:A10 Conference

2018 Atlantic Sun Conference women's soccer standings
	Conf.						Overall
Team	W		L		T	PCT	W		L		T	PCT
Lipscomb ‍†‍‡‍^{y}	7	–	1	–	0	.875	14	–	4	–	2	.750
NJIT ‍‍‍	5	–	2	–	1	.688	11	–	5	–	2	.667
Kennesaw St. ‍‍‍	5	–	3	–	0	.625	12	–	6	–	1	.658
Florida Gulf Coast ‍‍‍	5	–	3	–	0	.625	13	–	4	–	2	.737
Liberty ‍‍‍	5	–	3	–	0	.625	6	–	11	–	0	.353
North Alabama ‍‍‍	3	–	4	–	1	.438	11	–	9	–	1	.548
North Florida ‍‍‍	2	–	5	–	1	.313	7	–	8	–	1	.469
Stetson ‍‍‍	1	–	6	–	1	.188	4	–	10	–	3	.324
Jacksonville ‍‍‍	1	–	7	–	0	.125	1	–	14	–	1	.094
† – Conference champion ‡ – 2018 ASUN Tournament champion y – Invited to the NCAA tournament As of November 7, 2018; Rankings from United Soccer Coaches Poll; Source:Atlantic Sun Conference

2018 ACC women's soccer standings
	Conf.						Overall
Team	W		L		T	PCT	W		L		T	PCT
No. 2 North Carolina ‍†‍‍^{y}	10	–	0	–	0	1.000	20	–	4	–	2	.808
No. 10 Duke ‍‍‍^{y}	8	–	1	–	1	.850	16	–	4	–	2	.773
No. 11 Virginia ‍‍‍^{y}	7	–	3	–	0	.700	16	–	5	–	1	.750
Boston College ‍‍‍^{y}	6	–	3	–	1	.650	14	–	5	–	1	.725
Louisville ‍‍‍^{y}	6	–	4	–	0	.600	12	–	7	–	0	.632
No. 25 Clemson ‍‍‍^{y}	6	–	4	–	0	.600	12	–	9	–	0	.571
No. 1 Florida State ‍‍‡‍^{y}	5	–	4	–	1	.550	20	–	4	–	3	.796
No. 21 Virginia Tech ‍‍‍^{y}	5	–	5	–	0	.500	11	–	8	–	3	.568
No. 25 Wake Forest ‍‍‍^{y}	4	–	6	–	0	.400	9	–	9	–	2	.500
Notre Dame ‍‍‍	4	–	6	–	0	.400	8	–	10	–	0	.444
No. 22 NC State ‍‍‍^{y}	3	–	5	–	2	.400	11	–	7	–	4	.591
Miami ‍‍‍	3	–	6	–	1	.350	6	–	9	–	3	.417
Pittsburgh ‍‍‍	0	–	10	–	0	.000	4	–	12	–	1	.265
Syracuse ‍‍‍	0	–	10	–	0	.000	3	–	15	–	0	.167
† – Conference champion ‡ – 2018 ACC Tournament champion y – Invited to the NCAA Tournament; As of December 4, 2018; Rankings from United Soccer Coaches Poll; Source: The ACC

2018 Big East Conference women's soccer standings
	Conf.						Overall
Team	W		L		T	PCT	W		L		T	PCT
No. 2 Georgetown ‍†‍‡‍^{y}	8	–	0	–	1	.944	17	–	0	–	3	.925
Butler ‍‍‍	6	–	2	–	1	.722	13	–	6	–	1	.675
St. John's ‍‍‍	5	–	3	–	1	.611	9	–	9	–	1	.500
Xavier ‍‍‍	4	–	3	–	2	.556	10	–	8	–	3	.548
DePaul ‍‍‍	4	–	3	–	2	.556	8	–	6	–	5	.553
Providence ‍‍‍	4	–	3	–	2	.556	11	–	6	–	3	.625
Creighton ‍‍‍	3	–	5	–	1	.389	6	–	10	–	1	.382
Villanova ‍‍‍	3	–	6	–	0	.333	9	–	9	–	0	.500
Marquette ‍‍‍	2	–	5	–	2	.333	4	–	11	–	3	.306
Seton Hall ‍‍‍	0	–	9	–	0	.000	2	–	12	–	4	.222
† – Conference champion ‡ – 2018 Big East Tournament champion y – Invited to the NCAA tournament As of November 1, 2018; Rankings from United Soccer Coaches Poll; Source:The Big East Conference

2018 Big Sky Conference women's soccer standings
	Conf.						Overall
Team	W		L		T	PCT	W		L		T	PCT
Weber St. ‍†‍‍	7	–	1	–	1	.833	9	–	5	–	4	.611
Idaho ‍‍‍	6	–	1	–	2	.778	9	–	7	–	3	.553
Northern Colorado ‍‍‍	6	–	2	–	1	.722	12	–	8	–	1	.595
Northern Arizona ‍‍‍	5	–	1	–	3	.722	9	–	5	–	4	.611
Montana ‍‍‡‍^{y}	3	–	2	–	4	.556	7	–	9	–	6	.455
Eastern Washington ‍‍‍	4	–	4	–	1	.500	8	–	8	–	3	.500
Portland St. ‍‍‍	3	–	5	–	1	.389	5	–	10	–	1	.344
Sac State ‍‍‍	2	–	7	–	0	.222	3	–	13	–	2	.222
Southern Utah ‍‍‍	1	–	7	–	1	.167	2	–	15	–	1	.139
Idaho St. ‍‍‍	1	–	8	–	0	.111	2	–	14	–	0	.125
† – Conference champion ‡ – 2018 Big Sky Tournament champion y – Invited to the NCAA Tournament; As of November 13, 2018; Rankings from United Soccer Coaches Poll; Source:The Big Sky Conference

2018 Big South Conference women's soccer standings
	Conf.						Overall
Team	W		L		T	PCT	W		L		T	PCT
Radford ‍†‍‡‍^{y}	9	–	1	–	0	.900	16	–	3	–	1	.825
Gardner-Webb ‍‍‍	7	–	1	–	2	.800	12	–	5	–	4	.667
Longwood ‍‍‍	6	–	2	–	2	.700	8	–	7	–	3	.528
Campbell ‍‍‍	5	–	4	–	1	.550	7	–	11	–	1	.395
Charleston Southern ‍‍‍	5	–	4	–	1	.550	9	–	6	–	2	.588
USC Upstate ‍‍‍	5	–	5	–	0	.500	11	–	9	–	0	.550
Winthrop ‍‍‍	4	–	6	–	0	.400	8	–	9	–	1	.472
High Point ‍‍‍	3	–	4	–	3	.450	5	–	10	–	4	.368
Presbyterian ‍‍‍	3	–	7	–	0	.300	8	–	8	–	0	.500
UNC Asheville ‍‍‍	2	–	6	–	2	.300	3	–	9	–	4	.313
Hampton ‍‍‍	0	–	9	–	1	.050	1	–	12	–	1	.107
† – Conference champion ‡ – 2018 Big South Tournament champion y – Invited to the NCAA tournament As of November 14, 2018; Rankings from United Soccer Coaches Poll; Source:Big South Conference

2018 Big Ten Conference women's soccer standings
	Conf.						Overall
Team	W		L		T	PCT	W		L		T	PCT
No. 15 Penn St ‍†‍‍^{y}	9	–	2	–	0	.818	15	–	5	–	1	.738
No. 25 Rutgers ‍‍‍^{y}	7	–	1	–	3	.773	11	–	3	–	5	.711
No. 22 Wisconsin ‍‍‍^{y}	6	–	2	–	3	.682	12	–	3	–	4	.737
Ohio State ‍‍‍^{y}	6	–	2	–	3	.682	9	–	5	–	4	.611
Nebraska ‍‍‍	5	–	3	–	3	.591	9	–	7	–	5	.548
Illinois ‍‍‍	6	–	5	–	0	.545	11	–	8	–	1	.575
Minnesota ‍‍‡‍^{y}	5	–	5	–	1	.500	11	–	8	–	2	.571
Michigan ‍‍‍	5	–	5	–	1	.500	9	–	9	–	1	.500
Northwestern ‍‍‍^{y}	4	–	4	–	3	.500	10	–	4	–	4	.667
Iowa ‍‍‍	4	–	5	–	2	.455	8	–	7	–	3	.528
Indiana ‍‍‍	4	–	7	–	0	.364	8	–	8	–	2	.500
Maryland ‍‍‍	2	–	7	–	2	.273	4	–	10	–	5	.342
Purdue ‍‍‍	1	–	7	–	3	.227	6	–	8	–	4	.444
Michigan St ‍‍‍	0	–	9	–	2	.091	5	–	10	–	3	.361
† – Conference champion ‡ – 2018 Big Ten Tournament champion y – Invited to the NCAA tournament As of November 6, 2018; Rankings from United Soccer Coaches Poll; Source:The Big Ten Conference

2018 Big West Conference women's soccer standings
	Conf.						Overall
Team	W		L		T	PCT	W		L		T	PCT
Long Beach St ‍†‍‡‍^{y}	5	–	1	–	2	.750	12	–	6	–	3	.643
UC Santa Barbara ‍‍‍	5	–	2	–	1	.688	13	–	7	–	1	.643
UC Irvine ‍‍‍	4	–	1	–	3	.688	8	–	7	–	4	.526
UC Davis ‍‍‍	4	–	2	–	2	.625	7	–	8	–	4	.474
Hawaii ‍‍‍	4	–	4	–	0	.500	9	–	7	–	1	.559
UC Riverside ‍‍‍	2	–	4	–	2	.375	11	–	4	–	3	.694
Cal Poly ‍‍‍	2	–	4	–	2	.375	2	–	12	–	5	.237
Cal State Northridge ‍‍‍	2	–	6	–	0	.250	6	–	9	–	1	.406
Cal State Fullerton ‍‍‍	1	–	5	–	2	.250	4	–	12	–	3	.289
† – Conference champion ‡ – 2018 Big West Tournament champion y – Invited to the NCAA tournament As of November 13, 2018; Rankings from United Soccer Coaches Poll; Source:The Big West Conference

2018 Big 12 Conference women's soccer standings
	Conf.						Overall
Team	W		L		T	PCT	W		L		T	PCT
No. 9 Baylor ‍†‍‍^{y}	8	–	1	–	0	.889	20	–	6	–	0	.769
No. 14 West Virginia ‍‍‡‍^{y}	7	–	2	–	0	.778	15	–	4	–	4	.739
No. 20 Texas ‍‍‍^{y}	5	–	3	–	1	.611	13	–	5	–	3	.690
TCU ‍‍‍^{y}	5	–	3	–	1	.611	13	–	5	–	3	.690
No. 24 Texas Tech ‍‍‍^{y}	5	–	3	–	1	.611	14	–	5	–	3	.705
Kansas ‍‍‍^{y}	5	–	4	–	0	.556	12	–	6	–	3	.643
Oklahoma ‍‍‍	3	–	5	–	1	.389	7	–	10	–	2	.421
Oklahoma State ‍‍‍	2	–	6	–	1	.278	10	–	7	–	1	.583
Iowa State ‍‍‍	2	–	6	–	1	.278	4	–	14	–	2	.250
Kansas State ‍‍‍	0	–	9	–	0	.000	4	–	12	–	2	.278
† – Conference champion ‡ – Tournament champion y – Invited to the NCAA tournament Rankings from United Soccer Coaches

2018 Colonial Athletic Association women's soccer standings
	Conf.						Overall
Team	W		L		T	PCT	W		L		T	PCT
James Madison ‍†‍‍	7	–	1	–	1	.833	11	–	8	–	1	.575
Northeastern ‍‍‍	7	–	2	–	0	.778	10	–	9	–	1	.525
Hofstra ‍‍‡‍^{y}	6	–	2	–	1	.722	16	–	5	–	1	.750
Charleston ‍‍‍	5	–	3	–	1	.611	11	–	8	–	1	.575
Drexel ‍‍‍	4	–	4	–	1	.500	7	–	7	–	5	.500
Delaware ‍‍‍	3	–	5	–	1	.389	4	–	12	–	2	.278
UNC Wilmington ‍‍‍	3	–	5	–	1	.389	9	–	6	–	1	.594
William & Mary ‍‍‍	3	–	5	–	1	.389	6	–	10	–	1	.382
Towson ‍‍‍	1	–	6	–	1	.188	4	–	12	–	3	.289
Elon ‍‍‍	1	–	7	–	1	.167	3	–	10	–	4	.294
† – Conference champion ‡ – 2018 CAA Tournament champion y – Invited to the NCAA tournament As of November 13, 2018; Rankings from United Soccer Coaches Poll; Source:Colonial Athletic Association

2018 Conference USA women's soccer standings
	Conf.						Overall
Team	W		L		T	PCT	W		L		T	PCT
North Texas ‍†‍‡‍^{y}	8	–	1	–	1	.850	15	–	3	–	3	.786
Florida Atlantic ‍‍‍	8	–	1	–	1	.850	12	–	8	–	1	.595
UAB ‍‍‍	6	–	4	–	0	.600	9	–	8	–	1	.528
Louisiana Tech ‍‍‍	5	–	3	–	2	.600	13	–	5	–	3	.690
Old Dominion ‍‍‍	5	–	3	–	2	.600	8	–	7	–	4	.526
Southern Miss ‍‍‍	5	–	4	–	1	.550	13	–	6	–	1	.675
Middle Tennessee ‍‍‍	5	–	4	–	1	.550	10	–	7	–	1	.583
Rice ‍‍‍	5	–	4	–	1	.550	7	–	9	–	1	.441
Charlotte ‍‍‍	4	–	6	–	0	.400	8	–	9	–	0	.471
Western Kentucky ‍‍‍	3	–	5	–	2	.400	5	–	8	–	4	.412
Marshall ‍‍‍	3	–	6	–	1	.350	5	–	9	–	3	.382
UTEP ‍‍‍	2	–	5	–	3	.350	7	–	8	–	4	.474
UTSA ‍‍‍	2	–	6	–	2	.300	6	–	9	–	2	.412
FIU ‍‍‍	0	–	9	–	1	.050	0	–	17	–	1	.028
† – Conference champion ‡ – 2018 C-USA Tournament champion y – Invited to the NCAA tournament As of November 14, 2018; Rankings from United Soccer Coaches Poll; Source:Conference USA

2018 Horizon League women's soccer standings
	Conf.						Overall
Team	W		L		T	PCT	W		L		T	PCT
Milwaukee ‍†‍‡‍^{y}	9	–	0	–	0	1.000	16	–	2	–	1	.868
Cleveland State ‍‍‍	6	–	2	–	1	.722	11	–	7	–	1	.605
Northern Kentucky ‍‍‍	6	–	2	–	1	.722	10	–	6	–	1	.618
Wright State ‍‍‍	5	–	3	–	1	.611	6	–	9	–	2	.412
Detroit Mercy ‍‍‍	4	–	4	–	1	.500	9	–	8	–	3	.525
Oakland ‍‍‍	3	–	3	–	3	.500	4	–	11	–	4	.316
IUPUI ‍‍‍	3	–	5	–	1	.389	6	–	10	–	3	.395
UIC ‍‍‍	3	–	6	–	0	.333	4	–	14	–	1	.237
Youngstown State ‍‍‍	0	–	7	–	2	.111	1	–	13	–	4	.167
Green Bay ‍‍‍	0	–	7	–	2	.111	2	–	13	–	2	.176
† – Conference champion ‡ – 2018 Horizon League Tournament champion y – Invited to the NCAA tournament As of November 14, 2018; Rankings from United Soccer Coaches Poll; Source:Horizon League

2018 Ivy League women's soccer standings
	Conf.						Overall
Team	W		L		T	PCT	W		L		T	PCT
Penn ‍†‍‍	5	–	1	–	1	.786	13	–	2	–	1	.844
No. 24 Princeton ‍†‍‍^{y}	5	–	1	–	1	.786	11	–	4	–	2	.706
Dartmouth ‍‍‍	4	–	2	–	1	.643	10	–	5	–	2	.647
Harvard ‍‍‍	4	–	2	–	1	.643	7	–	7	–	1	.500
Columbia ‍‍‍	4	–	3	–	0	.571	8	–	7	–	1	.531
Brown ‍‍‍	3	–	4	–	0	.429	8	–	8	–	1	.500
Yale ‍‍‍	1	–	6	–	0	.143	7	–	9	–	1	.441
Cornell ‍‍‍	0	–	7	–	0	.000	1	–	13	–	1	.100
† – Conference champion y – Invited to the NCAA Tournament; As of November 13, 2018; Rankings from United Soccer Coaches Poll; Source:Ivy League

2018 Mid-American Conference women's soccer standings
	Conf.						Overall
Team	W		L		T	PCT	W		L		T	PCT
Bowling Green ‍†‍‡‍^{y}	10	–	1	–	0	.909	14	–	4	–	3	.738
Ball State ‍‍‍	8	–	2	–	1	.773	14	–	3	–	3	.775
Western Michigan ‍‍‍	7	–	4	–	0	.636	14	–	7	–	0	.667
Ohio ‍‍‍	6	–	3	–	2	.636	9	–	8	–	3	.525
Kent State ‍‍‍	6	–	4	–	1	.591	10	–	8	–	2	.550
Akron ‍‍‍	5	–	5	–	1	.500	8	–	10	–	2	.450
Buffalo ‍‍‍	5	–	6	–	0	.455	11	–	8	–	0	.579
Eastern Michigan ‍‍‍	5	–	6	–	0	.455	10	–	11	–	0	.476
Central Michigan ‍‍‍	5	–	6	–	0	.455	7	–	12	–	0	.368
Toledo ‍‍‍	4	–	6	–	1	.409	8	–	9	–	2	.474
Miami (OH) ‍‍‍	1	–	10	–	0	.091	3	–	14	–	1	.194
Northern Illinois ‍‍‍	1	–	10	–	0	.091	2	–	17	–	0	.105
† – Conference champion ‡ – 2018 MAC Tournament champion y – Invited to the NCAA tournament As of November 13, 2018; Rankings from United Soccer Coaches Poll; Source:Mid-American Conference

2018 MAAC women's soccer standings
	Conf.						Overall
Team	W		L		T	PCT	W		L		T	PCT
Monmouth ‍†‍‡‍^{y}	9	–	1	–	0	.900	16	–	4	–	1	.786
Marist ‍‍‍	7	–	2	–	1	.750	9	–	8	–	2	.526
Siena ‍‍‍	6	–	2	–	2	.700	11	–	8	–	3	.568
Niagara ‍‍‍	5	–	3	–	2	.600	10	–	7	–	2	.579
Rider ‍‍‍	4	–	3	–	3	.550	8	–	6	–	4	.556
Quinnipiac ‍‍‍	3	–	3	–	4	.500	6	–	8	–	4	.444
St. Peter's ‍‍‍	3	–	6	–	1	.350	3	–	12	–	1	.219
Manhattan ‍‍‍	2	–	5	–	3	.350	3	–	8	–	4	.333
Fairfield ‍‍‍	2	–	6	–	2	.300	7	–	9	–	2	.444
Canisius ‍‍‍	1	–	5	–	4	.300	4	–	8	–	5	.382
Iona ‍‍‍	1	–	7	–	2	.200	3	–	13	–	2	.222
† – Conference champion ‡ – 2018 MAAC Tournament champion y – Invited to the NCAA Tournament; As of November 14, 2018; Rankings from United Soccer Coaches Poll; Source:MAAC

2018 Missouri Valley Conference women's soccer standings
	Conf.						Overall
Team	W		L		T	PCT	W		L		T	PCT
Loyola ‍†‍‡‍^{y}	6	–	1	–	0	.857	11	–	7	–	1	.605
Drake ‍‍‍	5	–	1	–	1	.786	9	–	9	–	1	.500
UNI ‍‍‍	4	–	3	–	0	.571	9	–	7	–	3	.553
Illinois State ‍‍‍	4	–	3	–	0	.571	10	–	9	–	2	.524
Missouri State ‍‍‍	2	–	3	–	2	.429	8	–	9	–	2	.474
Valparaiso ‍‍‍	2	–	4	–	1	.357	5	–	8	–	3	.406
Evansville ‍‍‍	2	–	4	–	1	.357	4	–	12	–	3	.289
Indiana State ‍‍‍	0	–	6	–	1	.071	6	–	9	–	3	.417
† – Conference champion ‡ – 2018 Missouri Valley Tournament champion y – Invited to the NCAA tournament As of November 14, 2018; Rankings from United Soccer Coaches Poll; Source:Missouri Valley Conference

2018 Mountain West Conference women's soccer standings
	Conf.						Overall
Team	W		L		T	PCT	W		L		T	PCT
Boise State ‍†‍‍	7	–	2	–	2	.727	13	–	4	–	3	.725
Wyoming ‍†‍‍	7	–	2	–	2	.727	12	–	4	–	4	.700
New Mexico ‍†‍‍	7	–	2	–	2	.727	13	–	6	–	2	.667
San Jose St ‍‍‡‍^{y}	6	–	2	–	3	.682	9	–	6	–	6	.571
Fresno State ‍‍‍	5	–	3	–	3	.591	6	–	10	–	4	.400
Colorado College ‍‍‍	5	–	4	–	2	.545	9	–	7	–	2	.556
UNLV ‍‍‍	5	–	4	–	2	.545	11	–	6	–	3	.625
San Diego St ‍‍‍	4	–	4	–	3	.500	6	–	10	–	3	.395
Colorado St ‍‍‍	3	–	6	–	2	.364	6	–	9	–	4	.421
Utah State ‍‍‍	2	–	7	–	2	.273	3	–	13	–	2	.222
Air Force ‍‍‍	1	–	7	–	3	.227	2	–	9	–	6	.294
Nevada ‍‍‍	1	–	10	–	0	.091	4	–	13	–	2	.263
† – Conference champion ‡ – 2018 MW Tournament champion y – Invited to the NCAA Tournament; As of November 14, 2018; Rankings from United Soccer Coaches Poll; Source:Mountain West Conference

2018 Northeast Conference women's soccer standings
	Conf.						Overall
Team	W		L		T	PCT	W		L		T	PCT
Central Connecticut ‍†‍‡‍^{y}	8	–	0	–	0	1.000	16	–	2	–	2	.850
Saint Francis (PA) ‍‍‍	5	–	2	–	1	.688	8	–	9	–	3	.475
Mount St. Mary's ‍‍‍	4	–	2	–	2	.625	5	–	9	–	3	.382
Fairleigh Dickinson ‍‍‍	4	–	3	–	1	.563	6	–	10	–	3	.395
Bryant ‍‍‍	4	–	3	–	1	.563	8	–	7	–	1	.531
Robert Morris ‍‍‍	4	–	4	–	0	.500	6	–	12	–	0	.333
Sacred Heart ‍‍‍	3	–	5	–	0	.375	5	–	13	–	0	.278
Wagner ‍‍‍	1	–	7	–	0	.125	3	–	14	–	0	.176
LIU Brooklyn ‍‍‍	0	–	7	–	1	.063	2	–	13	–	3	.194
† – Conference champion ‡ – 2018 NEC Tournament champion y – Invited to the NCAA tournament As of November 14, 2018; Rankings from United Soccer Coaches Poll; Source:Northeast Conference

2018 Ohio Valley Conference women's soccer standings
	Conf.						Overall
Team	W		L		T	PCT	W		L		T	PCT
UT Martin ‍†‍‍	9	–	0	–	1	.950	15	–	3	–	1	.816
Murray State ‍‍‡‍^{y}	4	–	3	–	0	.571	13	–	5	–	1	.711
EIU ‍‍‍	4	–	3	–	3	.550	6	–	8	–	6	.450
EKU ‍‍‍	4	–	3	–	3	.550	8	–	8	–	4	.500
SIUE ‍‍‍	4	–	5	–	1	.450	6	–	9	–	2	.412
Belmont ‍‍‍	4	–	5	–	1	.450	6	–	8	–	3	.441
SEMO ‍‍‍	3	–	4	–	3	.450	5	–	8	–	5	.417
Morehead St. ‍‍‍	4	–	6	–	0	.400	5	–	14	–	0	.263
Tennessee Tech ‍‍‍	3	–	5	–	2	.400	7	–	8	–	2	.471
Austin Peay ‍‍‍	3	–	6	–	1	.350	8	–	8	–	1	.500
Jacksonville St. ‍‍‍	2	–	7	–	1	.250	4	–	11	–	3	.306
† – Conference champion ‡ – 2018 OVC Tournament champion y – Invited to the NCAA tournament As of November 14, 2018; Rankings from United Soccer Coaches Poll; Source:Ohio Valley Conference

2018 Pac-12 Conference women's soccer standings
	Conf.						Overall
Team	W		L		T	PCT	W		L		T	PCT
No. 1 Stanford ‍†‍‍^{y}	10	–	0	–	1	.955	18	–	0	–	2	.950
No. 4 UCLA ‍‍‍^{y}	9	–	2	–	0	.818	15	–	3	–	1	.816
No. 6 USC ‍‍‍^{y}	8	–	2	–	1	.773	16	–	2	–	2	.850
Utah ‍‍‍	5	–	4	–	2	.545	9	–	8	–	2	.526
Colorado ‍‍‍	5	–	4	–	2	.545	13	–	4	–	3	.725
Arizona ‍‍‍^{y}	5	–	4	–	2	.545	13	–	5	–	2	.700
Washington State ‍‍‍^{y}	5	–	5	–	1	.500	13	–	5	–	1	.711
Arizona State ‍‍‍	5	–	5	–	1	.500	10	–	7	–	1	.583
Oregon ‍‍‍	3	–	8	–	0	.273	9	–	9	–	1	.500
Washington ‍‍‍	3	–	8	–	0	.273	8	–	10	–	1	.447
California ‍‍‍	1	–	9	–	1	.136	5	–	12	–	2	.316
Oregon State ‍‍‍	1	–	10	–	0	.091	2	–	17	–	0	.105
† – Conference champion y – Invited to the NCAA Tournament; As of November 13, 2018; Rankings from United Soccer Coaches Poll; Source:Pac 12

2018 Patriot League women's soccer standings
	Conf.						Overall
Team	W		L		T	PCT	W		L		T	PCT
Boston U ‍†‍‡‍^{y}	7	–	0	–	2	.889	11	–	7	–	4	.591
Colgate ‍‍‍	7	–	1	–	1	.833	11	–	4	–	3	.694
Navy ‍‍‍	7	–	2	–	0	.778	11	–	6	–	3	.625
Bucknell ‍‍‍	5	–	1	–	0	.833	5	–	6	–	1	.458
Lehigh ‍‍‍	3	–	6	–	0	.333	8	–	12	–	0	.400
Army ‍‍‍	2	–	4	–	3	.389	7	–	6	–	7	.525
American ‍‍‍	2	–	4	–	3	.389	7	–	5	–	5	.559
Holy Cross ‍‍‍	3	–	6	–	0	.333	5	–	12	–	0	.294
Loyola (MD) ‍‍‍	2	–	6	–	1	.278	6	–	10	–	1	.382
Lafayette ‍‍‍	2	–	7	–	0	.222	5	–	12	–	0	.294
† – Conference champion ‡ – 2018 Patriot League tournament champion y – Invited to the NCAA tournament As of November 13, 2018; Rankings from United Soccer Coaches Poll; Source:Patriot League

2018 SEC women's soccer standings
	Conf.						Overall
Team	W		L		T	PCT	W		L		T	PCT
No. 13 Vanderbilt ‍†‍‍^{y}	8	–	1	–	1	.850	15	–	3	–	1	.816
No. 10 Tennessee ‍‍‍^{y}	7	–	2	–	1	.750	14	–	2	–	1	.853
Arkansas ‍‍‍^{y}	6	–	3	–	1	.650	14	–	4	–	3	.738
Ole Miss ‍‍‍^{y}	6	–	3	–	1	.650	12	–	7	–	1	.625
No. 18 South Carolina ‍‍‍^{y}	6	–	3	–	1	.650	14	–	5	–	1	.725
No. 16 Texas A&M ‍‍‍^{y}	6	–	3	–	1	.650	15	–	4	–	1	.775
No. 19 LSU ‍‍‡‍^{y}	5	–	4	–	1	.550	13	–	6	–	3	.659
Florida ‍‍‍	4	–	4	–	2	.500	7	–	10	–	4	.429
Auburn ‍‍‍^{y}	4	–	5	–	1	.450	12	–	6	–	2	.650
Missouri ‍‍‍	3	–	6	–	1	.350	6	–	11	–	2	.368
Alabama ‍‍‍	2	–	6	–	2	.300	8	–	8	–	3	.500
Mississippi State ‍‍‍^{y}	2	–	6	–	2	.300	9	–	7	–	2	.556
Georgia ‍‍‍	1	–	6	–	3	.250	4	–	9	–	5	.361
Kentucky ‍‍‍	1	–	9	–	0	.100	5	–	14	–	0	.263
† – Conference champion ‡ – 2018 SEC Tournament champion y – Invited to the NCAA tournament As of November 13, 2018; Rankings from United Soccer Coaches Poll; Source: SEC

2018 Southern Conference women's soccer standings
	Conf.						Overall
Team	W		L		T	PCT	W		L		T	PCT
Samford ‍†‍‍	8	–	0	–	1	.944	12	–	6	–	1	.658
UNC Greensboro ‍‍‡‍^{y}	7	–	2	–	0	.778	15	–	5	–	1	.738
Furman ‍‍‍	5	–	4	–	0	.556	12	–	7	–	0	.632
Western Carolina ‍‍‍	5	–	4	–	0	.556	8	–	8	–	2	.500
ETSU ‍‍‍	5	–	4	–	0	.556	8	–	12	–	0	.400
Mercer ‍‍‍	4	–	3	–	2	.556	9	–	7	–	4	.550
Chattanooga ‍‍‍	4	–	3	–	2	.556	8	–	8	–	3	.500
The Citadel ‍‍‍	2	–	7	–	0	.222	9	–	10	–	0	.474
Wofford ‍‍‍	2	–	7	–	0	.222	5	–	13	–	1	.289
VMI ‍‍‍	0	–	8	–	1	.056	7	–	9	–	2	.444
† – Conference champion ‡ – 2018 Southern Tournament champion y – Invited to the NCAA tournament As of November 13, 2018; Rankings from United Soccer Coaches Poll; Source:SoCon

2018 Southland Conference women's soccer standings
	Conf.						Overall
Team	W		L		T	PCT	W		L		T	PCT
Cent. Arkansas ‍†‍‍	10	–	1	–	0	.909	16	–	4	–	1	.786
Houston Baptist ‍‍‍	8	–	2	–	1	.773	10	–	8	–	1	.553
Lamar ‍‍‍	7	–	2	–	2	.727	12	–	6	–	2	.650
Abilene Christian ‍‍‡‍	7	–	3	–	1	.682	15	–	6	–	1	.705
McNeese St ‍‍‍	7	–	3	–	1	.682	13	–	7	–	1	.643
SE Louisiana ‍‍‍	4	–	4	–	3	.500	7	–	7	–	4	.500
Northwestern St ‍‍‍	4	–	7	–	0	.364	10	–	10	–	0	.500
Stephen F. Austin ‍‍‍	3	–	5	–	3	.409	7	–	9	–	3	.447
Incarnate Word ‍‍‍	3	–	7	–	1	.318	3	–	12	–	1	.219
Texas A&M-CC ‍‍‍	2	–	7	–	2	.273	5	–	9	–	3	.382
Sam Houston St ‍‍‍	2	–	7	–	2	.273	3	–	12	–	3	.250
Nicholls St ‍‍‍	1	–	10	–	0	.091	3	–	15	–	0	.167
† – Conference champion ‡ – 2018 Southland Tournament champion y – Invited to the NCAA tournament As of November 14, 2018; Rankings from United Soccer Coaches Poll; Source:Southland Conference

2018 SWAC women's soccer standings
	Conf.						Overall
Team	W		L		T	PCT	W		L		T	PCT
Grambling State ‍†‍‍	9	–	1	–	0	.900	14	–	8	–	0	.636
Howard ‍‍‡‍^{y}	8	–	1	–	1	.850	12	–	6	–	2	.650
Texas Southern ‍‍‍	6	–	2	–	2	.700	7	–	7	–	4	.500
Alabama State ‍‍‍	6	–	4	–	0	.600	7	–	11	–	0	.389
Prairie View A&M ‍‍‍	5	–	3	–	2	.600	7	–	10	–	2	.421
Alabama A&M ‍‍‍	5	–	5	–	0	.500	5	–	12	–	1	.306
Southern ‍‍‍	3	–	5	–	2	.400	4	–	10	–	2	.313
UAPB ‍‍‍	3	–	5	–	2	.400	3	–	9	–	2	.286
Mississippi Valley St ‍‍‍	2	–	5	–	3	.350	5	–	9	–	4	.389
Jackson State ‍‍‍	2	–	8	–	0	.200	2	–	16	–	0	.111
Alcorn State ‍‍‍	0	–	10	–	0	.000	0	–	15	–	0	.000
† – Conference champion ‡ – 2018 SWAC Tournament champion y – Invited to the NCAA tournament As of November 14, 2018; Rankings from United Soccer Coaches Poll; Source:SWAC

2018 Sun Belt Conference women's soccer standings
	Conf.						Overall
Team	W		L		T	PCT	W		L		T	PCT
Texas State ‍†‍‍	8	–	0	–	2	.900	11	–	6	–	3	.625
Little Rock ‍‍‡‍^{y}	7	–	2	–	1	.750	14	–	5	–	3	.705
Coastal Carolina ‍‍‍	7	–	3	–	0	.700	8	–	8	–	1	.500
Appalachian State ‍‍‍	6	–	4	–	0	.600	9	–	9	–	1	.500
South Alabama ‍‍‍	5	–	4	–	1	.550	8	–	9	–	2	.474
Georgia State ‍‍‍	5	–	4	–	1	.550	8	–	10	–	2	.450
Arkansas State ‍‍‍	5	–	5	–	0	.500	8	–	7	–	3	.528
Troy ‍‍‍	4	–	6	–	0	.400	5	–	14	–	1	.275
Georgia Southern ‍‍‍	3	–	7	–	0	.300	5	–	12	–	0	.294
UL Lafayette ‍‍‍	2	–	7	–	1	.250	3	–	12	–	3	.250
UL Monroe ‍‍‍	0	–	10	–	0	.000	0	–	17	–	0	.000
† – Conference champion ‡ – 2018 Sun Belt Tournament champion y – Invited to the NCAA tournament As of November 14, 2018; Rankings from United Soccer Coaches Poll; Source:Sun Belt

2018 Summit League women's soccer standings
	Conf.						Overall
Team	W		L		T	PCT	W		L		T	PCT
Denver ‍†‍‡‍^{y}	7	–	1	–	0	.875	13	–	6	–	2	.667
South Dakota St ‍†‍‍	7	–	1	–	0	.875	12	–	6	–	1	.658
North Dakota St ‍‍‍	6	–	2	–	0	.750	9	–	7	–	0	.563
Omaha ‍‍‍	4	–	3	–	1	.563	8	–	11	–	2	.429
South Dakota ‍‍‍	4	–	4	–	0	.500	9	–	7	–	2	.556
North Dakota ‍‍‍	3	–	4	–	1	.438	9	–	6	–	2	.588
Oral Roberts ‍‍‍	3	–	5	–	0	.375	8	–	12	–	0	.400
Purdue Fort Wayne ‍‍‍	1	–	7	–	0	.125	4	–	12	–	3	.289
Western Illinois ‍‍‍	0	–	8	–	0	.000	3	–	14	–	1	.194
† – Conference champion ‡ – 2018 Summit League Tournament champion y – Invited to the NCAA tournament As of November 14, 2018; Rankings from United Soccer Coaches Poll; Source:Summit League

2018 West Coast Conference women's soccer standings
	Conf.						Overall
Team	W		L		T	PCT	W		L		T	PCT
No. 24 BYU ‍†‍‍^{y}	8	–	1	–	0	.889	13	–	5	–	1	.711
No. 7 Santa Clara ‍‍‍^{y}	7	–	2	–	0	.778	17	–	3	–	1	.833
Pepperdine ‍‍‍	6	–	1	–	2	.778	11	–	6	–	2	.632
Gonzaga ‍‍‍	5	–	2	–	2	.667	10	–	4	–	4	.667
San Francisco ‍‍‍	4	–	3	–	2	.556	11	–	7	–	2	.600
Portland ‍‍‍	4	–	5	–	0	.444	11	–	9	–	0	.550
San Diego ‍‍‍	4	–	5	–	0	.444	8	–	9	–	1	.472
Saint Mary's ‍‍‍	2	–	6	–	1	.278	7	–	10	–	2	.421
Loyola Marymount ‍‍‍	1	–	7	–	1	.167	3	–	13	–	4	.250
Pacific ‍‍‍	0	–	9	–	0	.000	2	–	16	–	0	.111
† – Conference champion y – Invited to the NCAA tournament As of November 14, 2018; Rankings from United Soccer Coaches Poll; Source:West Coast Conference

2018 WAC women's soccer standings
	Conf.						Overall
Team	W		L		T	PCT	W		L		T	PCT
UMKC ‍†‍‍	7	–	1	–	0	.875	16	–	5	–	0	.762
Texas–Rio Grande Valley ‍‍‍	6	–	1	–	1	.813	12	–	6	–	3	.643
Seattle ‍‍‡‍^{y}	6	–	1	–	1	.813	10	–	8	–	3	.548
California Baptist ‍‍‍	4	–	4	–	0	.500	12	–	5	–	1	.694
Grand Canyon ‍‍‍	3	–	3	–	2	.500	6	–	13	–	2	.333
Cal State Bakersfield ‍‍‍	3	–	4	–	1	.438	6	–	10	–	2	.389
Utah Valley ‍‍‍	3	–	4	–	1	.438	5	–	14	–	2	.286
New Mexico State ‍‍‍	1	–	7	–	0	.125	2	–	16	–	0	.111
Chicago State ‍‍‍	0	–	8	–	0	.000	0	–	16	–	1	.029
† – Conference champion ‡ – 2018 WAC Tournament champion y – Invited to the NCAA tournament As of November 14, 2018; Rankings from United Soccer Coaches Poll; Source:WAC
