= 2018 Northeast Conference women's soccer tournament =

- Classification: Division I
- Teams: 4
- Matches: 3
- Attendance: 2,444
- Site: Central Connecticut Soccer Field; New Britain, Connecticut
- Champions: Central Connecticut (9th title)
- Winning coach: Mick D’Arcy (7th title)
- MVP: Danielle Pearse (Central Connecticut)
- Broadcast: None

2018 Northeast Conference women's soccer standings
	Conf.						Overall
Team	W		L		T	PCT	W		L		T	PCT
Central Connecticut ‍†‍‡‍^{y}	8	–	0	–	0	1.000	16	–	2	–	2	.850
Saint Francis (PA) ‍‍‍	5	–	2	–	1	.688	8	–	9	–	3	.475
Mount St. Mary's ‍‍‍	4	–	2	–	2	.625	5	–	9	–	3	.382
Fairleigh Dickinson ‍‍‍	4	–	3	–	1	.563	6	–	10	–	3	.395
Bryant ‍‍‍	4	–	3	–	1	.563	8	–	7	–	1	.531
Robert Morris ‍‍‍	4	–	4	–	0	.500	6	–	12	–	0	.333
Sacred Heart ‍‍‍	3	–	5	–	0	.375	5	–	13	–	0	.278
Wagner ‍‍‍	1	–	7	–	0	.125	3	–	14	–	0	.176
LIU Brooklyn ‍‍‍	0	–	7	–	1	.063	2	–	13	–	3	.194
† – Conference champion ‡ – 2018 NEC Tournament champion y – Invited to the NCAA tournament As of November 14, 2018; Rankings from United Soccer Coaches Poll; Source:Northeast Conference

The 2018 Northeast Conference women's soccer tournament was the postseason women's soccer tournament for the Northeast Conference held on November 2 and 4, 2018. The three-match tournament took place at Central Connecticut Soccer Field in New Britain, Connecticut, home of the regular season champions and tournament #1 seed Central Connecticut State Blue Devils. The four-team single-elimination tournament consisted of two rounds based on seeding from regular season conference play. The defending champions were the Saint Francis Red Flash but they were unable to defend their title, losing 2–1 in the final to Central Connecticut. This was the ninth Northeast Conference tournament title for the Central Connecticut women's soccer program, seven of which have come under the direction of head coach Mick D'Arcy.

== Bracket ==
Semifinals; Friday, November 2
1	Central Connecticut	2
4	Fairleigh Dickinson	1
2	St. Francis	4
3	Mt. St. Mary's	0

Final; Sunday, November 4
1	Central Connecticut	2
2	St. Francis	1

== Schedule ==
=== Semifinals ===
November 2, 2018	#1 Central Connecticut	2–1	#4 Fairleigh Dickinson	New Britain, Connecticut
1:00 p.m. EST	Danielle Pearse 54', 80'	Report	Jackson Bennett 68'	Stadium: Central Connecticut Soccer Field; Attendance: 998; Referee: Carlos Fernandes; Assistant referees: Jessica Carnevale; Kenneth Heller

November 2, 2018	#2 St. Francis	4–0	#3 Mt. St. Mary's	New Britain, Connecticut
4:00 p.m. EST	Emilee Barnett 14'; Corinne Renninger 30'; Sara Suler 52'; Dakota Graham 57'	Report	Maria Buonomo (yellow card) 83'	Stadium: Central Connecticut Soccer Field; Attendance: 123; Referee: Joe Rio; Assistant referees: Leah Hayes; Alexandria White

=== Final ===
November 4, 2018	#1 Central Connecticut	2–1	#2 St. Francis	New Britain, Connecticut
1:00 p.m. EST	Jenna Rae Covello (yellow card) 55', (goal) 88'; Danielle Pearse 66'	Report	Sara Suler 77'	Stadium: Central Connecticut Soccer Field; Attendance: 1,323; Referee: Danny Marques; Assistant referees: Alexandria White; Alex Casella

== Statistics ==
=== Goalscorers ===
3 Goals

- Danielle Pearse - Central Connecticut

2 Goals

- Sara Suler - St. Francis

1 Goal

- Emilee Barnett - St. Francis
- Jackson Bennett - Fairleigh Dickinson
- Jenna Rae Covello - Central Connecticut
- Dakota Graham - St. Francis
- Corinne Renninger - St. Francis

== All-Tournament team ==
Player	Team
Danielle Pearse	Central Connecticut (MVP)
Erica Bardes	Central Connecticut
Jenna Rae Covello	Central Connecticut
Yo Tachibana	Central Connecticut
Emilee Barnett	St. Francis
Julia Hernan	St. Francis
Corinne Renninger	St. Francis
Maria Buonono	Mount Saint Mary's
Jenna West	Mount Saint Mary's
Madelyn Robbins	Fairleigh Dickinson
Amanda Fitzgerald	Fairleigh Dickinson

== See also ==
- Northeast Conference
- 2018 NCAA Division I women's soccer season
- 2018 NCAA Division I Women's Soccer Tournament
