= 2018 Ohio Valley Conference women's soccer tournament =

- Classification: Division I
- Teams: 8
- Matches: 7
- Attendance: 2,481
- Site: Skyhawk Soccer Field; Martin, Tennessee (Semifinals & Final)
- Champions: Murray State (4th title)
- Winning coach: Jeremy Groves (3rd title)
- MVP: Alex Steigerwald (Murray State)
- Broadcast: OVC Digital Network

2018 Ohio Valley Conference women's soccer standings
	Conf.						Overall
Team	W		L		T	PCT	W		L		T	PCT
UT Martin ‍†‍‍	9	–	0	–	1	.950	15	–	3	–	1	.816
Murray State ‍‍‡‍^{y}	4	–	3	–	0	.571	13	–	5	–	1	.711
EIU ‍‍‍	4	–	3	–	3	.550	6	–	8	–	6	.450
EKU ‍‍‍	4	–	3	–	3	.550	8	–	8	–	4	.500
SIUE ‍‍‍	4	–	5	–	1	.450	6	–	9	–	2	.412
Belmont ‍‍‍	4	–	5	–	1	.450	6	–	8	–	3	.441
SEMO ‍‍‍	3	–	4	–	3	.450	5	–	8	–	5	.417
Morehead St. ‍‍‍	4	–	6	–	0	.400	5	–	14	–	0	.263
Tennessee Tech ‍‍‍	3	–	5	–	2	.400	7	–	8	–	2	.471
Austin Peay ‍‍‍	3	–	6	–	1	.350	8	–	8	–	1	.500
Jacksonville St. ‍‍‍	2	–	7	–	1	.250	4	–	11	–	3	.306
† – Conference champion ‡ – 2018 OVC Tournament champion y – Invited to the NCAA tournament As of November 14, 2018; Rankings from United Soccer Coaches Poll; Source:Ohio Valley Conference

The 2018 Ohio Valley Conference women's soccer tournament was the postseason women's soccer tournament for the Ohio Valley Conference held from October 26 through November 4, 2018. The first round and quarterfinals of the tournament were held at campus sites hosted by the #3 and #4 seeds, while the semifinals and final took place at Skyhawk Soccer Field in Martin, Tennessee. The eight-team single-elimination tournament consisted of four rounds based on seeding from regular season conference play. The Murray State Racers were the defending champions and successfully defended their title with a 2–1 win over the Tennessee-Martin Skyhawks in the final. The conference tournament title was the fourth for the Murray State women's soccer program and the third for head coach Jeremy Groves.

== Bracket ==
First round Friday, Oct. 26
5	SIUE	2^{OT}
8	Morehead St.	1
6	Belmont	0 (3)
7	Southeast Missouri	0 (4)

Quarterfinals; Sunday, Oct. 28
4	Eastern Kentucky	0 (4)
5	SIUE	0 (3)
3	Eastern Illinois	1 (3)
7	Southeast Missouri	1 (2)

Semifinals; Friday, Nov. 2
1	UT Martin	1
4	Eastern Kentucky	0
2	Murray State	3
3	Eastern Illinois	2

Final; Sunday, Nov. 4
1	UT Martin	1
2	Murray State	2

== Schedule ==
=== First Round ===
October 26, 2018	#5 SIUE	2–1 (a.e.t.)	#8 Morehead St.	Richmond, Kentucky
1:00 p.m. CST	Angel Ikeda 48'; Andrea Frerker 93'	Report	Katie Quinn 36'; Colleen Swift (yellow card) 86'	Stadium: EKU Soccer Field; Attendance: 175; Referee: Jordan Barker; Assistant referees: Rizal Milliken; Benjamin Senior

October 26, 2018	#6 Belmont	0–0 (a.e.t.) (3–4 p)	#7 Southeast Missouri	Charleston, Illinois
1:00 p.m. CST	Emily Whitcomb (yellow card) 61'; Niki Clements (yellow card) 91'	Report		Stadium: EIU Rugby Field; Attendance: 145
	Penalties
	Sarah Bossung (penalty scored); Jessi Boozer (penalty missed); Ziesig Kameron (penalty scored); Megan Michela (penalty missed); Paige Hewitt (penalty scored); Jordan Chawan (penalty missed); Morgan Pettit (penalty missed)		Jennifer Brien (penalty missed); Lexi Grote (penalty scored); Lauren Kaempfe (penalty missed); Amanda Orlando (penalty scored); Jordan Nelson (penalty scored); Katie Lever (penalty missed); Maddi Karstens (penalty scored)

=== Quarterfinals ===
October 28, 2018	#4 Eastern Kentucky	0–0 (a.e.t.) (4–3 p)	#5 SIUE	Richmond, Kentucky
12:00 p.m. CST	Taran McMillan (yellow card) 65'	Report	Megan Keeven (yellow card) 70'	Stadium: EKU Soccer Field; Attendance: 310; Referee: Khary Williams; Assistant referees: Casie Anderson; Stan Sizemore
	Penalties
	Bailly Bounds (penalty scored); Kacy Eckley (penalty scored); Kylie Thompson (penalty scored); Taran McMillan (penalty scored); Erin Torrence (penalty missed)		Avery Anderson (penalty missed); Ikeda Angel (penalty scored); Kayla Klipsch (penalty scored); Andrea Frerker (penalty scored); Becca Jostes (penalty missed)

October 28, 2018	#3 Eastern Illinois	1–1 (a.e.t.) (3–2 p)	#7 Southeast Missouri	Charleston, Illinois
1:00 p.m. CST	Kayla Stolfa 38'	Report	Esmie Gonzales 75'	Stadium: Lakeside Soccer Field; Attendance: 569
	Penalties
	Henar Urteaga (penalty missed); Pilar Barrio (penalty missed); Angela Corcoran (penalty scored); Lexi Ketterhagen (penalty scored); Itxaso Aguero (penalty scored)		Lexi Grote (penalty missed); Amanda Orlando (penalty scored); Jordan Nelson (penalty scored); Maddi Karstens (penalty missed); Lauren Kaempfe (penalty missed)

=== Semifinals ===
November 2, 2018	#2 Murray State	1–0	#3 Eastern Illinois	Martin, Tennessee
4:00 p.m. CST	Symone Cooper (yellow card) 4'; Miyah Watford 13'	Report		Stadium: Skyhawk Soccer Field; Referee: Don Eubank; Assistant referees: Keith Green; Donovan Eubank; Fourth official: Eric Cox

November 2, 2018	#1 UT Martin	3–2	#4 Eastern Kentucky	Martin, Tennessee
7:00 p.m. CST	Kaci Mitchell 62'; Samantha Kelly 67'; Amy McGivern 72'	Report	Ríos 45'; Bailly Bounds 89'	Stadium: Skyhawk Soccer Field; Attendance: 631; Referee: Jeff Pulley; Assistant referees: Robert Musoiu; Landon Pilant; Fourth official: Eric Cox

=== Final ===
November 4, 2018	#1 UT Martin	1–2	#2 Murray State	Martin, Tennessee
2:00 p.m. CST	Kaci Mitchell 62'; Amy McGivern (yellow card) 63'	Report	Rebecca Kubin 47'; Miyah Watford 55'	Stadium: Skyhawk Soccer Field; Attendance: 651; Referee: Johann Arnason; Assistant referees: Jacob Post; Jervis Atagana; Fourth official: Eric Cox

== Statistics ==
=== Goalscorers ===
2 Goals

- Kaci Mitchell – UT Martin
- Miyah Watford – Murray State

1 Goal

- Bailly Bounds – Eastern Kentucky
- Andrea Frerker – SIUE
- Esmie Gonzales – Southeast Missouri
- Angel Ikeda – SIUE
- Samantha Kelly – UT Martin
- Rebecca Kubin – Murray State
- Amy McGivern – UT Martin
- Katie Quinn – Morehead St.
- Monica Rios – Eastern Kentucky
- Kayla Stolfa – Eastern Illinois

== All-Tournament team ==
Player	Team
Henar Urteaga	Eastern Illinois
Lindsey Carlson	Eastern Illinois
Zoe Aguirre	Eastern Kentucky
Mónica Ríos	Eastern Kentucky
Sara Ketis	UT Martin
Jacalyn Schubring	UT Martin
Danae Kaldaridou	UT Martin
Izzy Heckman	Murray State
Karsyn Hasch	Murray State
Joselle Morche	Murray State
Alex Steigerwald	Murray State (MVP)
