= 2018 SWAC women's soccer tournament =

- Classification: Division I
- Teams: 8
- Matches: 7
- Attendance: 508
- Site: PVA&M Soccer Stadium; Prairie View, Texas
- Champions: Howard (3rd title)
- Winning coach: Brent Leiba (3rd title)
- MVP: Jordan Taylor (Howard)
- Broadcast: None

2018 SWAC women's soccer standings
	Conf.						Overall
Team	W		L		T	PCT	W		L		T	PCT
Grambling State ‍†‍‍	9	–	1	–	0	.900	14	–	8	–	0	.636
Howard ‍‍‡‍^{y}	8	–	1	–	1	.850	12	–	6	–	2	.650
Texas Southern ‍‍‍	6	–	2	–	2	.700	7	–	7	–	4	.500
Alabama State ‍‍‍	6	–	4	–	0	.600	7	–	11	–	0	.389
Prairie View A&M ‍‍‍	5	–	3	–	2	.600	7	–	10	–	2	.421
Alabama A&M ‍‍‍	5	–	5	–	0	.500	5	–	12	–	1	.306
Southern ‍‍‍	3	–	5	–	2	.400	4	–	10	–	2	.313
UAPB ‍‍‍	3	–	5	–	2	.400	3	–	9	–	2	.286
Mississippi Valley St ‍‍‍	2	–	5	–	3	.350	5	–	9	–	4	.389
Jackson State ‍‍‍	2	–	8	–	0	.200	2	–	16	–	0	.111
Alcorn State ‍‍‍	0	–	10	–	0	.000	0	–	15	–	0	.000
† – Conference champion ‡ – 2018 SWAC Tournament champion y – Invited to the NCAA tournament As of November 14, 2018; Rankings from United Soccer Coaches Poll; Source:SWAC

The 2018 SWAC women's soccer tournament was the postseason women's soccer tournament for the Southwestern Athletic Conference held November 1–4, 2018. The seven-match tournament took place at the Prairie View A&M Soccer Stadium in Prairie View, Texas. The eight-team single-elimination tournament consisted of three rounds based on seeding from regular season conference play. The defending champions were the Alabama State Hornets, however they were unable to defend their title, losing 1–0 to the Grambling State Tigers in the Semifinals. The eventual champions were the Howard Bison, who defeated Grambling State 1–0 in the final. The conference tournament title was the third in the history of the Howard women's soccer program, all of which have come under the direction of head coach Brent Leiba.

== Bracket ==
Quarterfinals; Thursday, Nov. 1
1	Grambling State	3
8	UAPB	0
4	Alabama State	1
5	Prairie View A&M	0
3	Texas Southern	2
6	Alabama A&M	0
2	Howard	1^{2OT}
7	Southern	0

Semifinals; Friday, Nov. 2
1	Grambling State	1
4	Alabama State	0
2	Howard	0 (4)
3	Texas Southern	0 (1)

Final; Sunday, Nov. 4
1	Grambling State	0
2	Howard	1

== Schedule ==
=== Quarterfinals ===
November 1, 2018	#1 Grambling State	3–0	#8 UAPB	Prairie View, Texas
10:00 a.m. CST	Florence David 46'; Kalley Pena 67'; Brittany Terry 70'; Jordyn King (yellow card) 89'	Report		Stadium: PVA&M Soccer Stadium; Attendance: 46; Referee: Deepak Lumba; Assistant referees: Cedric Thomas; Benjamin Wooten; Fourth official: Laith Dahhan

November 1, 2018	#4 Alabama State	1–0	#5 Prairie View A&M	Prairie View, Texas
12:30 p.m. CST	Birgit Rijnders 62'	Report	Reina Cruz (yellow card) 84'	Stadium: PVA&M Soccer Stadium; Attendance: 93; Referee: Logan Reeves; Assistant referees: Ruben Campillo; Estefania Estrada; Fourth official: Deepak Lumba

November 1, 2018	#3 Texas Southern	2–0	#6 Alabama A&M	Prairie View, Texas
3:00 p.m. CST	Begona Bravo 15', 23'	Report		Stadium: PVA&M Soccer Stadium; Attendance: 76; Referee: Laith Dahhan; Assistant referees: Benjamin Wooten; Cedric Thomas; Fourth official: Shawn Cummings

November 1, 2018	#2 Howard	1–0 (a.e.t.)	#7 Southern	Prairie View, Texas
5:30 p.m. CST	Jordan Taylor 105' (pen.)	Report	Bri'anna Schroeder	Stadium: PVA&M Soccer Stadium; Attendance: 48; Referee: Ruben Campillo; Assistant referees: Shawn Cummings; Estefania Estrada; Fourth official: Logan Reeves

=== Semifinals ===
November 2, 2018	#1 Grambling State	1–0	#4 Alabama State	Prairie View, Texas
3:00 p.m. CST	Jasmine Smith 83'	Report		Stadium: PVA&M Soccer Stadium; Attendance: 82; Referee: Benjamin Wooten; Assistant referees: George Kubove; Shawn Cummings; Fourth official: Estefania Estrada

November 2, 2018	#2 Howard	0–0 (a.e.t.) (4–1 p)	#3 Texas Southern	Prairie View, Texas
5:30 p.m. CST	Kendall Hamilton (yellow card) 2'; Makela Davidson (yellow card) 104'	Report	Rania Kablawi (yellow card) 98'	Stadium: PVA&M Soccer Stadium; Attendance: 48; Referee: Cedric Thomas; Assistant referees: Logan Reeves; Laith Dahhan; Fourth official: Estefania Estrada
	Penalties
	Jordan Taylor (penalty scored); Kendall Hamilton (penalty scored); Victoria Thornton (penalty scored); Kendall Macauly (penalty scored)		Brooke Ianeiro (penalty scored); Briana Norwood (penalty missed); Paul Vizoso (penalty missed)

=== Final ===
November 4, 2018	#1 Grambling State	0–1	#2 Howard	Prairie View, Texas
11:00 a.m. CST	Kiawna Mounts (yellow card) 27'; Kaitlin Pardy (yellow card) 68'	Report	Jordan Taylor 51'	Stadium: PVA&M Soccer Stadium; Attendance: 115; Referee: Estefania Estrada; Assistant referees: Benjamin Wooten; Laith Dahhan; Fourth official: Kyle Phillips

== Statistics ==
=== Goalscorers ===
2 Goals

- Begona Bravo – Texas Southern
- Jordan Taylor – Howard

1 Goal

- Florence David – Grambling State
- Kalley Pena – Grambling State
- Birgit Rijnders – Alabama State
- Jasmine Smith – Grambling State
- Brittany Terry – Grambling State

== All-Tournament team ==
Player	Team
Begona Bravo	Texas Southern
Briana Norwood	Texas Southern
Chimoa Eriken	Southern
Jasmine Smith	Grambling
Kailey Pena	Grambling
Florence David	Grambling
Haileigh Adams	Grambling
Thalia Boucher	Howard
Makela Davidson	Howard
Alayah Hightower	Howard
Jordan Taylor	Howard (MVP)
