= 2018 Big South Conference women's soccer tournament =

- Classification: Division I
- Teams: 8
- Matches: 7
- Attendance: 2,432
- Site: Sportsplex at Matthews; Matthews, North Carolina (Semifinals and Final)
- Champions: Radford (6th title)
- Winning coach: Ben Sohrabi (6th title)
- MVP: Jasmine Casarez (Radford)
- Broadcast: ESPN+

2018 Big South Conference women's soccer standings
	Conf.						Overall
Team	W		L		T	PCT	W		L		T	PCT
Radford ‍†‍‡‍^{y}	9	–	1	–	0	.900	16	–	3	–	1	.825
Gardner-Webb ‍‍‍	7	–	1	–	2	.800	12	–	5	–	4	.667
Longwood ‍‍‍	6	–	2	–	2	.700	8	–	7	–	3	.528
Campbell ‍‍‍	5	–	4	–	1	.550	7	–	11	–	1	.395
Charleston Southern ‍‍‍	5	–	4	–	1	.550	9	–	6	–	2	.588
USC Upstate ‍‍‍	5	–	5	–	0	.500	11	–	9	–	0	.550
Winthrop ‍‍‍	4	–	6	–	0	.400	8	–	9	–	1	.472
High Point ‍‍‍	3	–	4	–	3	.450	5	–	10	–	4	.368
Presbyterian ‍‍‍	3	–	7	–	0	.300	8	–	8	–	0	.500
UNC Asheville ‍‍‍	2	–	6	–	2	.300	3	–	9	–	4	.313
Hampton ‍‍‍	0	–	9	–	1	.050	1	–	12	–	1	.107
† – Conference champion ‡ – 2018 Big South Tournament champion y – Invited to the NCAA tournament As of November 14, 2018; Rankings from United Soccer Coaches Poll; Source:Big South Conference

The 2018 Big South Conference women's soccer tournament was the postseason women's soccer tournament for the Big South Conference held from October 27 through November 4, 2018. The quarterfinals of the tournament were held at campus sites, while the semifinals and final took place at Sportsplex at Matthews in Matthews, North Carolina. The eight-team single-elimination tournament consisted of three rounds based on seeding from regular season conference play. The High Point Panthers were the defending champions, but they were eliminated from the 2018 tournament with a 2–0 quarterfinal loss to the Radford Highlanders. The Radford Highlanders won the tournament with a 1–0 win over Gardner–Webb in the final. The conference tournament title was the sixth for the Radford women's soccer program and the sixth for head coach Ben Sohrabi.

== Bracket ==
Quarterfinals; October 27–28
4	Campbell	2
5	Charleston Southern	1
1	Radford	2
8	High Point	0
2	Gardner-Webb	4
7	Winthrop	0
3	Longwood	0
6	USC Upstate	1

Semifinals; November 2
4	Campbell	0
1	Radford	2
2	Gardner-Webb	1
6	USC Upstate	0

Final; November 4
1	Radford	1
2	Gardner-Webb	0

== Schedule ==
=== Quarterfinals ===
October 27, 2018	#3 Longwood	0–1	#6 USC Upstate	Farmville, Virginia
2:00 p.m. EST		Report	Abbie Ellis 30' (pen.)	Stadium: Longwood Athletics Complex; Attendance: 218

October 27, 2018	#1 Radford	2–0	#8 High Point	Radford, Virginia
7:00 p.m. EST	Jasmine Casarez 28'; Jane Everett 49'	Report	Shaylyn Owen (yellow card) 43'	Stadium: Cupp Stadium; Attendance: 527; Referee: Hicham Elbariqi; Assistant referees: Kevin Maurer; Brian Odenwald; Fourth official: Phil Whisman

October 28, 2018	#2 Gardner-Webb	4–0	#7 Winthrop	Boiling Springs, North Carolina
2:00 p.m. EST	Stina Kleppe 12', 28' (pen.); Maggie Mae Everett 67'; Jana Bruan 72'	Report		Stadium: Greene-Harbison Stadium; Attendance: 225; Referee: Eric Usher; Assistant referees: Glenn Harris; Charlie Lester; Fourth official: Jeremy Mikell

October 28, 2018	#4 Campbell	2–1	#5 Charleston Southern	Buies Creek, North Carolina
2:00 p.m. EST	Rosie O'Neal 38'; Alexa Genas 80'	Report	Sidney Doherty 18'	Stadium: Eakes Complex; Attendance: 223; Referee: Clive Edwards; Assistant referees: Kevin Maurer; Matheu Becker; Fourth official: Scott Bowers

=== Semifinals ===
November 2, 2018	#1 Radford	2–0	#4 Campbell	Matthews, North Carolina
4:00 p.m. EST	Jasmine Casarez 9', 57' (yellow card) 86'; Gabi Paupst (yellow card) 14'	Report		Stadium: Sportsplex at Matthews; Attendance: 252; Referee: Jude Carr; Assistant referees: Anya Voigt; Benjamin Ellis; Fourth official: Caleb Fearing

November 2, 2018	#2 Gardner-Webb	1–0	#6 USC Upstate	Matthews, North Carolina
7:00 p.m. EST	Jada Newton 85'	Report	Kate Winegarner (yellow card) 41'; Autumn Gore (yellow card) 71'; Emelie Valenciano (yellow card) 81'	Stadium: Sportsplex at Matthews; Attendance: 425; Referee: Mary Penso; Assistant referees: Kevin Vitto; Kiah Haslett

=== Final ===
November 4, 2018	#1 Radford	1–0	#2 Gardner-Webb	Matthews, North Carolina
2:00 p.m. EST	Nelia Perez 7'	Report	Emily Jonas (yellow card) 69'	Stadium: Sportsplex at Matthews; Attendance: 562; Referee: Kyle Johnston; Assistant referees: L.B. Smith; Robert Velbis; Fourth official: Clive Edwards

== Statistics ==
=== Goalscorers ===
3 Goals

- Jasmine Casarez - Radford

2 Goals

- Stina Kleppe - Gardner-Webb

1 Goal

- Jana Bruan - Gardner-Webb
- Sidney Doherty - Charleston Southern
- Abbie Ellis - USC Upstate
- Jane Everett - Radford
- Alexa Genas - Campbell
- Maggie Mae Everett - Gardner-Webb
- Jada Newton - Gardner-Webb
- Rosie O'Neal - Campbell
- Nelia Perez - Radford

== All-Tournament team ==
Player	Team
Jasmine Casarez	Radford (MVP)
Nelia Perez	Radford
Courtenay Kaplan	Radford
Jordan Lundin	Radford
Keely Brown	Gardner-Webb
Stina Kleppe	Gardner-Webb
Callista Eckert	Gardner-Webb
Alexa Genas	Campbell
Erin Scott	Campbell
Abbie Ellis	USC Upstate
Emelie Valenciano	USC Upstate
Sidney Doherty	Charleston Southern
Dylan Patterson	Winthrop
Kathryn Miller	Longwood
Allie Reagan	High Point

== See also ==
- Big South Conference
- 2018 NCAA Division I women's soccer season
- 2018 NCAA Division I Women's Soccer Tournament
- 2018 Big South Conference Men's Soccer Tournament
