= 2018 Big Ten tournament =

2018 Big Ten tournament may refer to:

- 2018 Big Ten Conference men's basketball tournament
- 2018 Big Ten Conference women's basketball tournament
- 2018 Big Ten Conference men's soccer tournament
- 2018 Big Ten Conference women's soccer tournament
- 2018 Big Ten Conference baseball tournament
- 2018 Big Ten Conference softball tournament
- 2018 Big Ten men's ice hockey tournament
- 2018 Big Ten Conference men's lacrosse tournament
- 2018 Big Ten Conference women's lacrosse tournament
