= 2018 Patriot League women's soccer tournament =

- Classification: Division I
- Teams: 6
- Matches: 5
- Attendance: 1,878
- Site: Nickerson Field; Boston, Massachusetts (Semifinals and Final)
- Champions: Boston (4th title)
- Winning coach: Nancy Feldman (4th title)
- MVP: Anna Heilferty (Boston)
- Broadcast: Patriot League Network (Final)

2018 Patriot League women's soccer standings
| | Conf. | | | | | | Overall |
| Team | W | | L | | T | PCT | W | | L | | T | PCT |
|---|---|---|---|---|---|---|---|---|---|---|---|---|
| Boston U ‍†‍‡‍^{y} | 7 | – | 0 | – | 2 | .889 | 11 | – | 7 | – | 4 | .591 |
| Colgate ‍‍‍ | 7 | – | 1 | – | 1 | .833 | 11 | – | 4 | – | 3 | .694 |
| Navy ‍‍‍ | 7 | – | 2 | – | 0 | .778 | 11 | – | 6 | – | 3 | .625 |
| Bucknell ‍‍‍ | 5 | – | 1 | – | 0 | .833 | 5 | – | 6 | – | 1 | .458 |
| Lehigh ‍‍‍ | 3 | – | 6 | – | 0 | .333 | 8 | – | 12 | – | 0 | .400 |
| Army ‍‍‍ | 2 | – | 4 | – | 3 | .389 | 7 | – | 6 | – | 7 | .525 |
| American ‍‍‍ | 2 | – | 4 | – | 3 | .389 | 7 | – | 5 | – | 5 | .559 |
| Holy Cross ‍‍‍ | 3 | – | 6 | – | 0 | .333 | 5 | – | 12 | – | 0 | .294 |
| Loyola (MD) ‍‍‍ | 2 | – | 6 | – | 1 | .278 | 6 | – | 10 | – | 1 | .382 |
| Lafayette ‍‍‍ | 2 | – | 7 | – | 0 | .222 | 5 | – | 12 | – | 0 | .294 |
† – Conference champion ‡ – 2018 Patriot League tournament champion y – Invited to the NCAA tournament As of November 13, 2018; Rankings from United Soccer Coaches Poll; Source:Patriot League

The 2018 Patriot League women's soccer tournament was the postseason women's soccer tournament for the Patriot League held from October 30 through November 4, 2018. The quarterfinals of the tournament were held at campus sites, while the semifinals and final took place at Nickerson Field in Boston, Massachusetts. The six-team single-elimination tournament consisted of three rounds based on seeding from regular season conference play. The defending champions were the Bucknell Bison, however they were unable to defend their crown, losing to Lehigh 2–1 in the first round. The tournament was won by the Boston University Terriers, who were the #1 seed and defeated Lehigh 1–0 in the final. The conference championship was the fourth for the Boston University women's soccer program, all of which have come under coach Nancy Feldman.

== Bracket ==
Quarterfinals; Tuesday, Oct. 30
3 | Navy | 0
6 | Army | 1^{2OT}
4 | Bucknell | 1
5 | Lehigh | 2^{2OT}

Semifinals; Friday, Nov. 2
1 | Boston | 3
6 | Army | 0
2 | Colgate | 1
5 | Lehigh | 2

Final; Sunday, Nov. 4
1 | Boston | 1
5 | Lehigh | 0

== Schedule ==
=== Quarterfinals ===
| October 30, 2018 | #3 Navy | 0–1 (a.e.t.) | #6 Army | Annapolis, Maryland |
| 7:00 p.m. EST | | Report | Erynn Johns 101' | Stadium: Glenn Warner Soccer Facility; Attendance: 772; Referee: Karl Kummer; Assistant referees: Evan Horne; Will Aten; Fourth official: Justin Greenberg |

| October 30, 2018 | #4 Bucknell | 1–2 (a.e.t.) | #5 Lehigh | Lewisburg, Pennsylvania |
| 7:00 p.m. EST | Gabby Bair 18' | Report | Ally Friedman 41'; Kayla Arestivo 109' | Stadium: Emmitt Field at Holmes Stadium; Attendance: 375; Referee: Williams Paul; Assistant referees: Brandon Smith; Max Campbell; Fourth official: Adorae Whitesel |

=== Semifinals ===
| November 2, 2018 | #1 Boston | 3–0 | #6 Army | Boston, Massachusetts |
| 4:30 p.m. EST | Shannon Keefe 39', 71'; McKenna Kennedy 67'; Lily Perryman (yellow card) 85' | Report | Erynn Johns (yellow card) 82' | Stadium: Nickerson Field; Attendance: 305; Referee: Patrick Violette; Assistant referees: Mounir Idmalak; Sandro Araujo; Fourth official: Alp Gulden |

| November 2, 2018 | #2 Colgate | 1–2 | #5 Lehigh | Boston, Massachusetts |
| 7:30 p.m. EST | Adrienne Vaughn 59' | Report | Courtney Supp 17'; Sabrina Mertz 89' | Stadium: Nickerson Field; Attendance: 305; Referee: Scott Kachmarik; Assistant referees: Jessica Remmes; Russ Wolf; Fourth official: Katherine Mitchell |

=== Final ===
| November 4, 2018 | #1 Boston | 1–0 | #5 Lehigh | Boston, Massachusetts |
| 2:00 p.m. EST | Anna Heilferty 72' | Report | Kayla Arestivo (yellow card) 70' | Stadium: Nickerson Field; Attendance: 426; Referee: Daniel Shenk-Moreno; Assistant referees: Leah Hayes; Dianna Kolodziey; Fourth official: Max Perkins |

== Statistics ==
=== Goalscorers ===
2 Goals

- Shannon Keefe - Boston

1 Goal

- Kayla Arestivo - Lehigh
- Gabby Bair - Bucknell
- Ally Friedman - Lehigh
- Anna Heilferty - Boston
- Erynn Johns - Army
- McKenna Kennedy - Boston
- Sabrina Mertz - Lehigh
- Courtney Supp - Lehigh
- Adrienne Vaughn - Colgate

== All-Tournament team ==
| Player | Team |
|---|---|
| Anna Heilferty | Boston University (MVP) |
| Chelsea Churchill | Boston University |
| Shannon Keefe | Boston University |
| McKenna Kennedy | Boston University |
| Kayla Arestivo | Lehigh |
| Ally Friedman | Lehigh |
| Sabrina Mertz | Lehigh |
| Adrienne Vaughn | Colgate |
| Ruby Diodati | Colgate |
| Sydney Witham | Army |
| Erynn Johns | Army |

== See also ==
- 2018 Patriot League Men's Soccer Tournament
