= 2018 Southern Conference women's soccer tournament =

- Classification: Division I
- Teams: 10
- Matches: 9
- Attendance: 2,692
- Site: Betts Stadium; Macon, Georgia (Semifinals and Final)
- Champions: UNC Greensboro (8th (Note: This is the 9th Southern Conference women's soccer tournament won by UNC Greensboro, but their 2010 title was later vacated.) title)
- Winning coach: Michael Coll (2nd title)
- MVP: Heida Ragney Vidarsdottir (UNC Greensboro)
- Broadcast: SoCon Digital Network; ESPN+ (Final)

2018 Southern Conference women's soccer standings
	Conf.						Overall
Team	W		L		T	PCT	W		L		T	PCT
Samford ‍†‍‍	8	–	0	–	1	.944	12	–	6	–	1	.658
UNC Greensboro ‍‍‡‍^{y}	7	–	2	–	0	.778	15	–	5	–	1	.738
Furman ‍‍‍	5	–	4	–	0	.556	12	–	7	–	0	.632
Western Carolina ‍‍‍	5	–	4	–	0	.556	8	–	8	–	2	.500
ETSU ‍‍‍	5	–	4	–	0	.556	8	–	12	–	0	.400
Mercer ‍‍‍	4	–	3	–	2	.556	9	–	7	–	4	.550
Chattanooga ‍‍‍	4	–	3	–	2	.556	8	–	8	–	3	.500
The Citadel ‍‍‍	2	–	7	–	0	.222	9	–	10	–	0	.474
Wofford ‍‍‍	2	–	7	–	0	.222	5	–	13	–	1	.289
VMI ‍‍‍	0	–	8	–	1	.056	7	–	9	–	2	.444
† – Conference champion ‡ – 2018 Southern Tournament champion y – Invited to the NCAA tournament As of November 13, 2018; Rankings from United Soccer Coaches Poll; Source:SoCon

The 2018 Southern Conference women's soccer tournament was the postseason women's soccer tournament for the Southern Conference held from October 24 through November 4, 2018. The first round and quarterfinals of the tournament were held at campus sites, while the semifinals and final took place at Betts Stadium in Macon, Georgia. The ten-team single-elimination tournament consisted of four rounds based on seeding from regular season conference play. The UNC Greensboro Spartans were the defending champions and successfully defended their crown with a 2–1 win over the Furman Paladins in the final. This was the eighth Southern Conference tournament title for the UNC Greensboro women's soccer program and the second for head coach Michael Coll.

== Bracket ==
First round Wednesday, October 24
8	Wofford	2
9	The Citadel	3
7	Chattanooga	0
10	VMI	1

Quarterfinals; Saturday/Sunday, October 27/28
1	Samford	1
9	The Citadel	0
4	Western Carolina	0
5	Furman	1
2	UNC Greensboro	3
10	VMI	2
3	ETSU	1
6	Mercer	0

Semifinals; Friday, November 2
1	Samford	0
5	Furman	2
2	UNC Greensboro	5
3	ETSU	1

Championship; Sunday, November 4
5	Furman	1
2	UNC Greensboro	2

== Schedule ==
=== First Round ===
October 24, 2018	#8 Wofford	2–3	#9 The Citadel	Spartanburg, South Carolina
6:00 p.m.	Jayley Younginer 14', 36'	Report	Kessy Bradshaw 57', 80'; Katherine Arroyo 64'; Logan Dix (yellow card) 88'	Stadium: Snyder Field; Attendance: 265; Referee: Brandon Marion; Assistant referees: Josh Escobar; Brian Bozard; Fourth official: Phillip McRuffe

October 24, 2018	#7 Chattanooga	0–1	#10 VMI	Chattanooga, Tennessee
7:00 p.m.	Jordan Mueller (yellow card) 80'		Amber Levy 13'	Stadium: Finley Stadium; Attendance: 213; Referee: Kyle Johnston; Assistant referees: Khadime Sabara; Daniel Velez; Fourth official: Richonne Clark

=== Quarterfinals ===
October 27, 2018	#2 UNC Greensboro	3–2	#10 VMI	Greensboro, North Carolina
2:00 p.m.	Emily Jensen 44'; Nicole Souply 67'; Grace Regal 81'	Report	Whitney Edwards-Roberson 27', 58'	Stadium: UNCG Soccer Stadium; Attendance: 193; Referee: Jon Rush; Assistant referees: Ryan Graves; Raymond Thomas; Fourth official: Jordan Davis

October 27, 2018	#1 Samford	1–0	#9 The Citadel	Birmingham, Alabama
6:30 p.m.	Allie Lourie (yellow card) 19'; Caroline Orman 48'	Report	Kessy Bradshaw (yellow card) 31'; Katherine Arroyo (yellow card) 80'; Team (yellow card) 86'	Stadium: Samford University Track & Soccer Stadium; Attendance: 276; Referee: Alyssa Pennington; Assistant referees: Kyle Johnston; Brandi Fletcher; Fourth official: Danile Velez

October 27, 2018	#4 Western Carolina	0–1	#5 Furman	Cullowhee, North Carolina
7:00 p.m.	Shannon Burns (yellow card) 66'	Report	Isabella Gutierrez 26'	Stadium: Catamount Athletic Club; Attendance: 325; Referee: Benjamin Wooten; Assistant referees: Bryan Peek; Mike Palazzo; Fourth official: Joe Kirkpatrick

October 28, 2018	#3 ETSU	1–0	#6 Mercer	Johnson City, Tennessee
2:00 p.m.	Sarah Connolly 79'	Report	Alina McCue (yellow card) 18'; Kylie Buchanan (yellow card) 57'; Haley McDuffee (yellow card) 84'; Payton Schurr (yellow card) 88'	Stadium: Summers-Taylor Stadium; Attendance: 423; Referee: Kyle Johnston; Assistant referees: Ben Ellis; Derek Ambrozaitis; Fourth official: Jay Giddings

=== Semifinals ===
November 2, 2018	#1 Samford	0–2	#5 Furman	Macon, Georgia
4:00 p.m.		Report	Stephanie Arrington (yellow card) 77'; Isabella Gutierrez 79', 81'	Stadium: Betts Stadium; Attendance: 532

November 2, 2018	#2 UNC Greensboro	5–1	#3 ETSU	Macon, Georgia
6:30 p.m.	Nicole Souply 18'; Grace Regal 43'; Jordin Mosley 50'; Cienna Rideout 67', 78 pen.'	Report	Allie Duggan 67'	Stadium: Betts Stadium; Attendance: 153

=== Final ===
November 4, 2018	#5 Furman	1–2	#2 UNC Greensboro	Macon, Georgia
2:00 p.m.	Virginia Poe 73'; Erin O'Hearn (yellow card) 84'	Report	Emily Jensen 30'; Grace Regal 39'	Stadium: Betts Stadium; Attendance: 312

== Statistics ==
=== Goalscorers ===
3 Goals

- Isabella Gutierrez - Furman
- Grace Regal - UNCG

2 Goals

- Kessy Bradshaw - The Citadel
- Whitney Edwards-Roberson - VMI
- Emily Jensen - UNCG
- Nicole Souply - UNCG
- Cienna Rideout - UNCG
- Jayley Younginer - Wofford

1 Goal

- Katherine Arroyo - The Citadel
- Sarah Connolly - ETSU
- Allie Duggan - ETSU
- Amber Levy - VMI
- Jordin Mosley - UNCG
- Caroline Orman - Samford
- Virginia Poe - Furman

== All-Tournament team ==
Player	Team
Lea Ann Cutshall	ETSU
Isabel Hodgson	ETSU
Leigh Haynes	Samford
Lexi Orman	Samford
Jordan Evens	Furman
Isabella Gutierrez	Furman
Erin O’ Hearn	Furman
Emily Jensen	UNCG
Grace Regal	UNCG
Cienna Rideout	UNCG
Heida Ragney Vidarsdottir	UNCG (MVP)

== See also ==
- 2018 Southern Conference Men's Soccer Tournament
