= 2018 WAC women's soccer tournament =

Women's soccer tournament in 2018

- Classification: Division I
- Teams: 6
- Matches: 5
- Attendance: 1,792
- Site: Clyde Field; Orem, Utah
- Champions: Seattle (4th title)
- Winning coach: Julie Woodward (4th title)
- MVP: Ariana Romero (Seattle)
- Broadcast: WAC Digital Network

2018 WAC women's soccer standings
	Conf.						Overall
Team	W		L		T	PCT	W		L		T	PCT
UMKC ‍†‍‍	7	–	1	–	0	.875	16	–	5	–	0	.762
Texas–Rio Grande Valley ‍‍‍	6	–	1	–	1	.813	12	–	6	–	3	.643
Seattle ‍‍‡‍^{y}	6	–	1	–	1	.813	10	–	8	–	3	.548
California Baptist ‍‍‍	4	–	4	–	0	.500	12	–	5	–	1	.694
Grand Canyon ‍‍‍	3	–	3	–	2	.500	6	–	13	–	2	.333
Cal State Bakersfield ‍‍‍	3	–	4	–	1	.438	6	–	10	–	2	.389
Utah Valley ‍‍‍	3	–	4	–	1	.438	5	–	14	–	2	.286
New Mexico State ‍‍‍	1	–	7	–	0	.125	2	–	16	–	0	.111
Chicago State ‍‍‍	0	–	8	–	0	.000	0	–	16	–	1	.029
† – Conference champion ‡ – 2018 WAC Tournament champion y – Invited to the NCAA tournament As of November 14, 2018; Rankings from United Soccer Coaches Poll; Source:WAC

The 2018 Western Athletic Conference women's soccer tournament was the postseason women's soccer tournament for the Western Athletic Conference held from October 31 to November 4, 2018. The five match tournament took place at Clyde Field in Orem, Utah on the campus of Utah Valley University. The six-team single-elimination tournament consisted of three rounds based on seeding from regular season conference play. The defending champions were the Utah Valley Wolverines, but they failed to defend their title after losing 3–0 to the UMKC Kangaroos in the semifinals. The tournament champions were the Seattle Redhawks, who defeated UMKC 1–0 in the final. This was the fourth WAC women's soccer tournament championship for the Seattle women's soccer program, all of which have come under head coach Julie Woodward.

== Bracket ==
First round Wednesday, Oct. 31
4	Grand Canyon	1
5	Utah Valley	2
3	Texas–Rio Grande Valley	0 (4)
6	Cal State Bakersfield	0 (3)

Semifinals; Friday, Nov. 1
1	Kansas City	3
5	Utah Valley	0
2	Seattle	2
3	Texas–Rio Grande Valley	0

Final; Sunday, Nov. 4
1	Kansas City	0
2	Seattle	1

== Schedule ==
=== First round ===
October 31, 2018	#3 Texas–Rio Grande Valley	0–0 (a.e.t.) (4–3 p)	#6 Cal State Bakersfield	Orem, Utah
12:00 p.m.		Report	Aryana Harvey (yellow card) 19'	Stadium: Clyde Field; Referee: Adriana Contreras; Assistant referees: Spencer Stolworthy; Michael Anglin
	Penalties
	Sarah Bonney (penalty missed); Tuva Nilsen (penalty scored); Katherine Stokley (penalty scored); Emily Zapata (penalty scored); Kinga Szemik (penalty missed); Diana Ansah (penalty scored)		Evelyn Daly (penalty scored); Sabrina Delgado (penalty scored); Aminah Settles (penalty missed); Aryana Harvey (penalty missed); Caitlin Goetjen (penalty scored); Coral Lake (penalty missed)

October 31, 2018	#4 Grand Canyon	1–2	#5 Utah Valley	Orem, Utah
3:00 p.m.	Sandra Hill 41'	Report	Sara Callister 11'; Sadie Brockbank 31'	Stadium: Clyde Field; Attendance: 991; Referee: Kali Smith; Assistant referees: Mike Allen; Marcelo Chaparro

=== Semifinals ===
November 2, 2018	#3 Texas–Rio Grande Valley	0–2	#2 Seattle	Orem, Utah
3:00 p.m.	Diandra Aliaga (yellow card) 78'	Report	Rio Valley Own Goal 22'; Laura Hooper (yellow card) 68'; Jessie Ray 82'	Stadium: Clyde Field; Referee: Kali Smith; Assistant referees: Brayden Allen; Spencer Stolworthy

November 2, 2018	#1 Kansas City	3–0	#5 Utah Valley	Orem, Utah
6:00 p.m.	Kelsey Mothershead 16'; Ryland Childers 55'; Lexie Howard 65'	Report	Sadie Brockbank (yellow card) 10'; Madeline Moore (yellow card) 53'	Stadium: Clyde Field; Attendance: 624; Referee: Adriana Contreras; Assistant referees: Brandon Major; David Wright

=== Final ===
November 4, 2018	#1 Kansas City	0–1	#2 Seattle	Orem, Utah
1:00 p.m.	Liz Mann (yellow card) 41'	Report	Kelsey Vogel 40'; Laura Hooper (yellow card) 77'	Stadium: Clyde Field; Attendance: 177; Referee: Karen Abt; Assistant referees: Mike Allen; Marcelo Chaparro

== Statistics ==
=== Goalscorers ===
1 Goal

- Sadie Brockbank – Utah Valley
- Sara Callister – Utah Valley
- Ryland Childers – Kansas City
- Sandra Hill – Grand Canyon
- Lexie Howard – Kansas City
- Kelsey Mothershead – Kansas City
- Jessie Ray – Seattle
- Kelsey Vogel – Seattle

Own Goals

- Texas–Tio Grande Valley vs. Seattle

== All-Tournament team ==
Player	Team
Sadie Brockbank	Utah Valley
Isabelle Butterfield	Seattle
Hannah Carrothers	Seattle
Jessie Ray	Seattle
Ariana Romero	Seattle (MVP)
Reighan Childers	Kansas City
Rylan Childers	Kansas City
Lexie Howard	Kansas City
Kelsey Mothershead	Kansas City
Sandra Hill	Grand Canyon
Kinga Szemik	UT Rio Grande Valley
