= Reina Cruz =

Salvadoran footballer (born 1996)

Personal information
- Full name: Reina Guadalupe Cruz Vásquez
- Date of birth: 19 June 1996 (age 30)
- Place of birth: El Salvador
- Height: 1.74 m (5 ft 8 1/2 in)
- Position: Defender

Team information
- Current team: Houston Aces

College career
Years	Team	Apps	(Gls)
2014–2018	Prairie View A&M Lady Panthers	69	(2)

Senior career*
Years	Team	Apps	(Gls)
2019–	Houston Aces		

International career^{‡}
2021–	El Salvador	3	(0)
- * Club domestic league appearances and goals ‡ National team caps and goals as of 13 Feb 2022

Reina Guadalupe Cruz Vásquez (born 19 June 1996) is a Salvadoran footballer who plays as a defender for Houston Aces and the El Salvador women's national team.

== Early life ==
Born in El Salvador, Cruz moved to Texas aged twelve where she attended Nimitz High School and later Prairie View A&M University.
