= 2018 Big Ten women's soccer tournament =

- Classification: Division I
- Teams: 8
- Matches: 7
- Site: Grand Park; Westfield, Indiana (Semifinals and Final)
- Champions: Minnesota (2nd title)
- Winning coach: Stefanie Golan (2nd title)
- MVP: April Bockin (Offensive); Maddie Nielsen (Defensive) (Minnesota)
- Broadcast: BTN

2018 Big Ten Conference women's soccer standings
	Conf.						Overall
Team	W		L		T	PCT	W		L		T	PCT
No. 15 Penn St ‍†‍‍^{y}	9	–	2	–	0	.818	15	–	5	–	1	.738
No. 25 Rutgers ‍‍‍^{y}	7	–	1	–	3	.773	11	–	3	–	5	.711
No. 22 Wisconsin ‍‍‍^{y}	6	–	2	–	3	.682	12	–	3	–	4	.737
Ohio State ‍‍‍^{y}	6	–	2	–	3	.682	9	–	5	–	4	.611
Nebraska ‍‍‍	5	–	3	–	3	.591	9	–	7	–	5	.548
Illinois ‍‍‍	6	–	5	–	0	.545	11	–	8	–	1	.575
Minnesota ‍‍‡‍^{y}	5	–	5	–	1	.500	11	–	8	–	2	.571
Michigan ‍‍‍	5	–	5	–	1	.500	9	–	9	–	1	.500
Northwestern ‍‍‍^{y}	4	–	4	–	3	.500	10	–	4	–	4	.667
Iowa ‍‍‍	4	–	5	–	2	.455	8	–	7	–	3	.528
Indiana ‍‍‍	4	–	7	–	0	.364	8	–	8	–	2	.500
Maryland ‍‍‍	2	–	7	–	2	.273	4	–	10	–	5	.342
Purdue ‍‍‍	1	–	7	–	3	.227	6	–	8	–	4	.444
Michigan St ‍‍‍	0	–	9	–	2	.091	5	–	10	–	3	.361
† – Conference champion ‡ – 2018 Big Ten Tournament champion y – Invited to the NCAA tournament As of November 6, 2018; Rankings from United Soccer Coaches Poll; Source:The Big Ten Conference

The 2018 Big Ten Conference women's soccer tournament is the postseason women's soccer tournament for the Big Ten Conference for the 2018 season. It is held from October 28 through November 4, 2018. The seven-match tournament began with first-round matches held at campus sites, before moving to Grand Park in Westfield, Indiana for the semifinals and final. The eight-team single-elimination tournament consisted of three rounds based on seeding from regular-season conference play. Penn State is the defending champions. Minnesota beat Penn State in the tournament championship game on penalties 5–4 in seven rounds. Minnesota is the Big Ten Tournament Champion.It was the first Big Ten final ever decided on penalties and just the fifth to go to overtime (first since 2014), with the Golden Gophers becoming the fourth No. 7 seed to win the Big Ten Tournament title and the first since Wisconsin in 2005.

== Seeds ==
Eight Big Ten schools participated in the tournament. Teams were seeded by conference record.

Seed	School	Conference record							
Seed	School	Pld.	W	L	T	GF	GA	GD	Pts.
1	Penn State	11	9	2	0	20	6	+14	27
2	Rutgers	11	7	1	3	12	6	+6	24
3	Ohio State	11	6	2	3	12	9	+3	21
4	Wisconsin	11	6	2	3	12	9	+3	21
5	Illinois	11	6	5	0	12	10	+2	18
6	Nebraska	11	5	3	3	15	12	+3	18
7	Minnesota	11	5	5	1	16	14	+2	16
8	Michigan	11	5	5	1	13	13	0	16

== Bracket ==
Quarterfinals; Sunday, Oct. 28
1	Penn State	1
8	Michigan	0
4	Wisconsin	2 (0)
5	Illinois	2 (3)
2	Rutgers	0
7	Minnesota	1
3	Ohio State	0 (2)
6	Nebraska	0 (3)

Semifinals; Friday, Nov. 2
1	Penn State	1
5	Illinois	0
7	Minnesota	2
6	Nebraska	0

Final; Sunday, Nov. 4
1	Penn State	0 (4)
7	Minnesota	0 (5)

== Schedule ==
=== Quarterfinals ===
October 28, 2018	#1 Penn State	1–0	#8 Michigan	State College, Pennsylvania
1:00 p.m. EDT	Marissa Sheva 88'	Report		Stadium: Jeffrey Field; Attendance: 1534; Referee: Peter Dhima; Assistant referees: Timothy Suess; Michael Gorsegner; Fourth official: Paul Gryszkiewicz

October 28, 2018	#4 Wisconsin	2–2 (a.e.t.) (0–3 p)	#5 Illinois	Madison, Wisconsin
1:00 p.m. EDT	Dani Rhodes 34'; Cameron Murtha 49'	Report	29' Katie Murray; 64' Hope Breslin	Stadium: McClimon Stadium; Attendance: 259; Referee: Micahael Allie; Assistant referees: Landon Albert; Jordan Pramuk; Fourth official: Danielle Kaminski
	Penalties
	Dani Rhodes (penalty missed); Lauren Rice (penalty missed); Payton Wesley (penalty missed)		(penalty scored) Patricia George; (penalty scored) Katelynn Buescher; (penalty scored) Madi Wolfbauer

October 28, 2018	#3 Ohio State	0–0 (a.e.t.) (2–3 p)	#6 Nebraska	Columbus, Ohio
2:00 p.m. EDT		Report		Stadium: Jesse Owens Memorial Stadium; Attendance: 292; Referee: Chris Ruska; Assistant referees: Brandon Klepach; Justin Bell; Fourth official: Noah Matos
	Penalties
	Alyssa Baumbick (penalty missed); Sarah Roberts (penalty scored); Blair Cowan (penalty missed); Haley Walker-Robinson (penalty scored); Izzy Rodriguez (penalty missed)		(penalty scored) Savanah Uveges; (penalty missed) Meg Brandt; (penalty scored) Kenzie Coons; (penalty missed) Brenna Ochoa; (penalty scored) Natalie Cooke

October 28, 2018	#2 Rutgers	0–1	#7 Minnesota	Piscataway, New Jersey
1:00 p.m. EDT		Report	87' April Bockin	Stadium: Yurcak Field; Attendance: 1137; Referee: Khalaf Al-Latayfeh; Assistant referees: Amber O'Connor; David Bork; Fourth official: George Evanego

=== Semifinals ===
November 2, 2018	#1 Penn State	1–0	#5 Illinois	Westfield, Indiana
11:00 a.m. CDT	Own Goal 66' (o.g.)	Report		Stadium: Grand Park; Attendance: 168; Referee: Marc Lawrence; Assistant referees: Jordan Pramuk; Kyle Hannon; Fourth official: Rachel Smith

November 2, 2018	#6 Nebraska	0–2	#7 Minnesota	Westfield, Indiana
1:30 p.m. CDT			2', 87' April Bockin	Stadium: Grand Park; Attendance: 168; Referee: Rebecca Pagan; Assistant referees: Nicole Green; Rachel Smith; Fourth official: Kyle Hannon

=== Final ===
November 4, 2018	#7 Minnesota	0–0 (a.e.t.) (5–4 p)	#1 Penn State	Westfield, Indiana
12:00 p.m. CDT		Report		Stadium: Grand Park; Attendance: 283; Referee: Art Arustamyan; Assistant referees: Nicole Green; Landon Albert; Fourth official: Marc Lawrence
	Penalties
	April Bockin (penalty scored); Emily Heslin (penalty missed); Haley Hartkemeyer (penalty scored); Haley Mennes (penalty missed); Emily Peterson (penalty scored); TJ McKendrick (penalty scored); Makenzie Langdok (penalty scored)		(penalty scored) Emily Ogle; (penalty missed) Marissa Sheva; (penalty missed) Shea Moyer; (penalty scored) Maddie Nolf; (penalty scored) Kaleigh Riehl; (penalty scored) Kim Dubs; (penalty missed) Frankie Tagliaferri

== All-Tournament team ==
- Katie Murray, Illinois
- Sarah Stratigakis, Michigan
- April Bockin, Minnesota – Offensive Player of the Tournament
- Emily Heslin, Minnesota
- Maddie Nielsen, Minnesota – Defensive Player of the Tournament
- Meg Brandt, Nebraska
- Devon Kerr, Ohio State
- Amanda Dennis, Penn State
- Ellie Jean, Penn State
- Amirah Ali, Rutgers
- Dani Rhodes, Wisconsin

== Statistics ==
=== Goalscorers ===
3 Goals

- April Bockin – Minnesota

1 Goal

- Hope Breslin – Illinois
- Katie Murray – Illinois
- Cameron Murtha – Wisconsin
- Dani Rhodes – Wisconsin
- Marissa Sheva – Penn State
