= Mónica Ríos =

American-raised Puerto Rican footballer

Personal information
- Full name: Mónica Ríos Marrero
- Date of birth: 10 December 1996 (age 29)
- Height: 1.65 m (5 ft 5 in)
- Position: Midfielder

Youth career
- Lexington Catholic High School

College career
Years	Team	Apps	(Gls)
2015–2019	Eastern Kentucky Colonels	67	(5)

International career^{‡}
2019–	Puerto Rico	2	(0)
- ‡ National team caps and goals as of 7 October 2019

Mónica Ríos Marrero (born 10 December 1996) is an American-raised Puerto Rican footballer who plays as a midfielder for the Puerto Rico women's national team.

== Early life ==
Ríos was raised in Lexington, Kentucky.
