= 2018 NCAA Division I women's soccer rankings =

- Season: 2018
- NCAA tournament: 2018
- Preseason No. 1: Stanford (Unanimuous)
- NCAA Tournament Champions: Florida State
NCAA Division I women's soccer rankings


Three polls make up the 2018 NCAA Division I women's soccer rankings, the United Soccer Coaches Poll, the Soccer America Poll, and the Top Drawer Soccer Poll. They represent the ranking system for the 2018 NCAA Division I women's soccer season.

== Legend ==
	Increase in ranking
	Decrease in ranking
	Not ranked previous week
Italics	Number of first place votes
(#–#–#)	Win–loss–tie record
т	Tied with team above or below also with this symbol

== United Soccer Coaches ==
	Preseason Aug. 8	Week 1 Aug. 21	Week 2 Aug. 28	Week 3 Sep. 4	Week 4 Sep. 11	Week 5 Sep. 18	Week 6 Sep. 25	Week 7 Oct. 2	Week 8 Oct. 9	Week 9 Oct. 16	Week 10 Oct. 23	Week 11 Oct. 30	Week 12 Nov. 7	Final Dec. 4	
1.	Stanford (34)	Stanford (1–0–0) (34)	Stanford (2–0–0) (32)	Stanford (4–0–0) (33)	Stanford (6–0–0) (35)	Stanford (7–0–1) (32)	Stanford (8–0–1) (33)	Stanford (10–0–1) (34)	Stanford (12–0–1) (34)	Stanford (12–0–1) (31)	Stanford (14–0–1) (32)	Stanford (15–0–2) (31)	Stanford (17–0–2) (34)	Florida State (20–4–3) (34)	1.
2.	UCLA (1)	UCLA (1–0–0)	UCLA (2–0–0) (2)	North Carolina (5–0–1)	Florida State (7–0–1)	Texas A&M (10–0–0) (1)	USC (8–0–1)	USC (9–1–1) (1)	USC (11–1–1) (1)	USC (12–1–1) (3)	USC (14–1–1) (2)	USC (15–1–2) (2)	Georgetown (17–0–3)	North Carolina (21–4–2)	2.
3.	Duke	Penn State (2–0–0)	North Carolina (3–0–1) (1)	Florida State (5–0–1)	USC (6–0–1)	USC (7–0–1) (1)	North Carolina (8–2–1) (1)	North Carolina (9–2–1)	North Carolina (11–2–1)	North Carolina (12–2–1)	North Carolina (14–2–1)	North Carolina (15–2–2)	North Carolina (17–3–1)	Stanford (21–1–2) (1)	3.
4.	Penn State	North Carolina (2–0–0)	Florida State (4–0–0)	USC (4–0–1) (2)	Texas A&M (8–0–0)	Virginia (7–0–0) (1)	Santa Clara (9–1–1)	Santa Clara (10–1–1)	Georgetown (12–0–2)	Georgetown (13–0–2) (1)	Georgetown (15–0–1) (1)	Georgetown (15–0–3) (1)	UCLA (14–3–1) (1)	Georgetown (21–1–3)	4.
5.	South Carolina	Florida (2–0–0)	Penn State (2–1–0)	Texas A&M (6–0–0)	Virginia (7–0–0)	North Carolina (6–2–1)	Texas A&M (11–1–0) (1)	Georgetown (10–0–2)	Texas A&M (13–1–1)	Texas A&M (14–1–1)	Duke (13–2–2)	Santa Clara (15–3–1)	Florida State (15–4–2)	UCLA (17–3–2)	5.
6.	North Carolina	Florida State (2–0–0) (1)	Virginia (4–0–0)	Virginia (5–0–0)	North Carolina (5–2–1)	Santa Clara (7–1–1)	Virginia (8–1–0)	Texas A&M (11–1–1)	Virginia (11–2–0)	Virginia (12–2–0)	Santa Clara (14–2–1)	UCLA (13–3–1)	USC (15–2–2)	USC (17–2–3)	6.
7.	Florida	Virginia (2–0–0)	USC (3–0–0)	UCLA (2–1–1)	Santa Clara (6–1–0)	Florida State (7–1–1)	Georgetown (8–0–2)	Washington State (10–0–0)	Santa Clara (11–2–1)	Santa Clara (12–2–1)	Vanderbilt (15–1–1)	Florida State (13–4–2)	Santa Clara (16–3–1)	Tennessee (16–3–3)	7.
8.	Virginia	USC (1–0–0)	Texas A&M (4–0–0)	Georgetown (4–0–2)	UCLA (3–1–1)	UCLA (5–1–1)	Texas (9–0–1)	Virginia (9–2–0)	Boston College (13–1–0)	South Carolina (11–2–1)	UCLA (11–3–1)	Duke (14–3–2) (1)	West Virginia (14–4–3)	Penn State (18–9–1)	8.
9.	West Virginia	Texas A&M (2–0–0)	Santa Clara (3–0–0)	Tennessee (5–0–1)	Auburn (7–0–0)	Auburn (9–0–0)	Washington State (8–0–0)	Tennessee (9–1–1)	South Carolina (11–2–0)	UCLA (9–3–1)	Florida State (12–3–2)	Baylor (16–4–0)	Duke (14–3–2)	Baylor (20–6–0)	9.
10.	Florida State	South Carolina (2–0–0)	Tennessee (3–0–1)	Auburn (6–0–0)	Georgetown (5–0–2)	Georgetown (7–0–2)	Florida State (8–2–1)	Florida State (9–2–1)	UCLA (8–3–1)	Duke (11–2–2)	Baylor (14–4–0)	Vanderbilt (15–2–1)	Tennessee (13–2–3)	Duke (16–4–2)	10.
11.	Texas A&M	Duke (1–1–0)	Georgetown (2–0–2)	Penn State (3–2–0)	Tennessee (6–0–1)	Texas (8–0–1)	Boston College (10–0–0)	Boston College (11–1–0)	Duke (10–2–2)	Boston College (13–1–1)	Virginia (13–3–0)	Virginia (14–4–0)	Baylor (17–5–0)	Virginia (16–5–1)	11.
12.	USC	Santa Clara (1–0–0)	Duke (2–1–1)	Santa Clara (4–1–0)	Northwestern (6–0–1)	Duke (7–1–1)	Tennessee (8–1–1)	South Carolina (9–2–0)	Vanderbilt (13–1–0)	Vanderbilt (13–1–1)	Tennessee (12–2–2)	Tennessee (12–3–2)	Virginia (15–4–0)	Santa Clara (17–3–2)	12.
13.	Princeton	Tennessee (2–0–0)	NC State (3–0–1)	NC State (5–0–1)	Duke (6–1–1)	South Carolina (7–1–0)	Oklahoma State (10–1–0)	Texas (9–0–2)	Florida State (10–3–1)	Baylor (12–4–0)	West Virginia (11–3–3)	Texas A&M (15–3–1)	Vanderbilt (15–3–1)	Texas A&M (17–5–1)	13.
14.	Notre Dame	Princeton (0–0–0)	Oklahoma State (3–0–0)	Duke (4–1–1)	Texas (6–0–1)	Washington State (7–0–0)	South Carolina (8–2–0)	Northwestern (8–2–2)	Baylor (11–4–0)	Florida State (10–3–2)	South Carolina (12–3–1)	West Virginia (12–4–3)	Penn State (15–5–1)	West Virginia (15–4–4)	14.
15.	Baylor	Gerogetown (1–0–1)	South Carolina (3–1–0)	Northwestern (4–0–1)	South Carolina (6–1–0)	Oklahoma State (8–1–0)	Duke (8–2–1)	UCLA (6–3–1)	Memphis (12–1–0)	Colorado (12–0–3)	Texas A&M (14–3–1)	Penn State (14–5–0)	Memphis (17–3–0)	Wisconsin (14–4–4)	15.
16.	UCF	NC State (1–0–0)	Northwestern (3–0–1)	Kansas (5–0–1)	Washington State (5–0–0)	NC State (7–1–1)	UCLA (5–2–1)	West Virginia (7–2–3)	Colorado (11–0–3)	West Virginia (9–3–3)	Penn State (13–5–0)	USF (12–2–0)	Texas A&M (15–4–1)	Vanderbilt (16–4–1)	16.
17.	Texas	Baylor (1–0–0)	Auburn (4–0–0)	Washington State (4–0–0)	NC State (6–1–1)	Wisconsin (7–1–1)	Northwestern (7–2–2)	Duke (8–2–2)	Tennessee (10–2–1)	Texas (11–1–2)	Texas (13–1–2)	South Carolina (12–4–1)	Texas (13–4–3)	South Carolina (14–6–1)	17.
18.	Pepperdine	Kansas (2–0–0)	Washington State (3–0–0)	Texas (4–0–1)	Kansas (5–0–2)	USF (4–1–0)	Colorado (9–0–1)	Memphis (10–1–0)	West Virginia (8–3–3)	Tennessee (10–2–2)	USF (11–2–0)	Texas (14–2–3)	South Carolina (13–5–1)	LSU (13–7–4)	18.
19.	Santa Clara	Northwestern (2–0–0)	Kansas (3–0–1)	South Carolina (4–1–0)	USF (4–1–0)	Tennessee (6–1–1)	USF (4–1–0)	Vanderbilt (11–1–0)	Washington State (10–2–0)	Wisconsin (11–2–3)	Boston College (13–3–1)	Memphis (15–3–0)	LSU (13–6–3)	South Florida (14–4–0)	19.
20.	NC State	Notre Dame (2–0–0)	Princeton (2–0–0)	USF (3–1–0)	Oklahoma State (6–1–0)	Penn State (5–3–0)	Memphis (10–1–0)	Colorado (9–0–3)	Texas (10–1–2)	USF (9–2–0)	Colorado (13–1–3)	Boston College (14–4–1)	USF (14–3–0)	Texas (13–5–3)	20.
21.	Washington State	Texas (1–0–0)	Texas Tech (4–0–0)	Oklahoma State (4–1–0)	Penn State (4–3–0)	Northwestern (6–1–2)	NC State (8–2–1)	Oklahoma State (10–2–1)	Rutgers (9–1–4)	Penn State (11–5–0)	Rutgers (13–1–3)	Colorado (13–3–3)	Princeton (11–3–2)	Virginia Tech (11–8–3)	21.
22.	Georgetown	Washington State (2–0–0)	Florida (2–2–0)	Butler (4–1–0)	Wisconsin (6–1–0)	Texas Tech (8–1–0)	Wisconsin (8–2–1)	Nebraska (8–3–3)	Wisconsin (10–2–3)	Washington State (10–3–0)	Memphis (14–3–0)	Wisconsin (12–3–4)	Boston College (14–4–1)	NC State (11–7–4)	22.
23.	Ohio State	UCF (0–0–0)	Texas (2–0–1)	Princeton (3–1–0)	Butler (6–1–0)	Colorado (8–0–1)	Auburn (9–1–1)	NC State (8–3–2)	Mississippi State (9–3–1)	Rutgers (9–2–5)	Wisconsin (12–3–3)	Clemson (12–7–0)	Wisconsin (12–3–4)	Memphis (17–4–0)	23.
24.	Rutgers	Auburn (2–0–0)	USF (2–1–0)	Louisville (5–0–0)	Texas Tech (6–1–0)	Kansas (6–1–2)	Penn State (6–4–0)	Baylor (9–4–0)	North Texas (8–1–1)	UCF (8–4–1)	Princeton (9–3–2)	Princeton (10–3–2)	BYU (13–4–1)	Texas Tech (14–5–3)	24.
25.	Tennessee	West Virginia (0–1–1)	Butler (3–0–0)	Texas Tech (4–1–0)	Princeton (5–1–0)	Princeton (5–2–1)	Vanderbilt (10–1–0)	Mississippi State (8–2–1)	Northwestern (8–4–2)	Mississippi State (9–4–1)	Pepperdine (9–6–1)	Rutgers (11–3–5)	Clemson (12–8–0)	Wake Forest (9–9–2)	25.
	Preseason Aug. 8	Week 1 Aug. 21	Week 2 Aug. 28	Week 3 Sep. 4	Week 4 Sep. 11	Week 5 Sep. 18	Week 6 Sep. 25	Week 7 Oct. 2	Week 8 Oct. 9	Week 9 Oct. 16	Week 10 Oct. 23	Week 11 Oct. 30	Week 12 Nov. 7	Final Dec. 4	
		Dropped: No.18 Pepperdine; No. 23 Ohio State; No. 24 Rutgers	Dropped: No. 17 Baylor; No.20 Notre Dame; No. 23 UCF; No. 25 West Virginia	Dropped: No. 22 Florida	Dropped: No. 24 Louisville	Dropped: No. 23 Butler	Dropped: No. 22 Texas Tech; No. 24 Kansas; No. 25 Princeton	Dropped: No. 19 USF; No. 22 Wisconsin; No. 23 Auburn; No. 24 Penn State	Dropped: No. 21 Oklahoma State; No. 22 Nebraska; No. 23 NC State	Dropped: No. 15 Memphis; No. 24 North Texas; No. 25 Northwestern	Dropped: No. 22 Washington State; No. 24 UCF; No. 25 Mississippi State	Dropped: No. 25 Pepperdine	Dropped: No. 21 Colorado; No. 25 Rutgers	Dropped: No. 21 Princeton; No. 22 Boston College; No. 24 BYU; No. 25 Clemson	

== Soccer America ==
	Preseason Aug. 16	Week 1 Aug. 21	Week 2 Aug. 28	Week 3 Sep. 4	Week 4 Sep. 11	Week 5 Sep. 18	Week 6 Sep. 25	Week 7 Oct 2.	Week 8 Oct. 9	Week 9 Oct. 16	Week 10 Oct. 23	Week 11 Oct. 30	Final Nov. 6	
1.	Stanford	Stanford (1–0–0)	Standford (2–0–0)	Stanford (4–0–0)	Stanford (6–0–0)	Stanford (7–0–1)	Stanford (8–0–1)	Stanford (10–0–1)	Stanford (12–0–1)	Stanford (12–0–1)	Stanford (14–0–1)	Stanford (15–0–2)	Stanford (17–0–2)	1.
2.	UCLA	UCLA (1–0–0)	UCLA (2–0–0)	Florida State (5–0–1)	Florida State (7–0–1)	Virginia (7–0–0)	USC (8–0–1)	USC (9–1–1)	USC (11–1–1)	USC (12–1–1)	USC (13–1–1)	USC (15–1–2)	UCLA (14–3–1)	2.
3.	Penn State	Penn State (2–0–0)	Florida State (4–0–0)	Virginia (5–0–0)	Virginia (7–0–0)	USC (7–0–1)	Santa Clara (9–1–1)	Santa Clara (10–1–1)	North Carolina (11–2–1)	North Carolina (12–2–1)	North Carolina (14–2–1)	North Carolina (16–2–1)	North Carolina (17–3–1)	3.
4.	North Carolina	North Carolina (2–0–0)	Virginia (4–0–0)	USC (4–0–1)	USC (6–0–1)	Texas A&M (10–0–0)	North Carolina (8–2–1)	North Carolina (9–2–1)	Georgetown (12–0–2)	Georgetown (13–0–2)	Georgetown (15–0–2)	UCLA (13–3–1)	USC (15–2–2)	4.
5.	Florida	Florida (2–0–0)	USC (3–0–0)	North Carolina (5–0–1)	Texas A&M (8–0–0)	UCLA (5–1–1)	Washington State (8–0–0)	Washington State (10–0–0)	South Carolina (11–2–0)	Texas A&M (14–1–1)	UCLA (11–3–1)	Georgetown (15–0–3)	Georgetown (17–0–3)	5.
6.	Florida State	Florida State (2–0–0)	North Carolina (3–0–1)	Texas A&M (6–0–0)	UCLA (3–1–1)	Santa Clara (7–1–1)	Texas (9–0–1)	Tennessee (9–1–1)	Texas A&M (13–1–1)	South Carolina (11–2–1)	Duke (13–2–2)	Tennessee (13–2–2)	Florida State (15–4–2)	6.
7.	Virginia	Virginia (2–0–0)	Penn State (2–1–0)	UCLA (2–1–1)	Santa Clara (6–1–0)	North Carolina (6–2–1)	Tennessee (8–1–1)	Georgetown (10–0–2)	Boston College (13–1–0)	Virginia (12–2–0)	Vanderbilt (15–1–1)	Baylor (16–4–0)	Tennessee (13–2–3)	7.
8.	West Virginia	USC (1–0–0)	Texas A&M (4–0–0)	NC State (5–0–1)	North Carolina (5–2–1)	South Carolina (6–1–0)	Boston College (10–0–0)	South Carolina (9–2–0)	Virginia (11–2–0)	Boston College (13–1–1)	Santa Clara (14–2–1)	Virginia (15–3–0)	West Virginia (14–4–3)	8.
9.	USC	Baylor (2–0–0)	Princeton (2–0–0)	Tennessee (5–0–1)	Tennessee (6–0–1)	Texas (8–0–1)	Virginia (8–1–0)	Florida State (9–2–1)	Colorado (11–0–3)	Colorado (12–0–3)	Tennessee (12–2–2)	Penn State (14–5–0)	Penn State (14–4–3)	9.
10.	Duke	Texas A&M (2–0–0)	Santa Clara (3–0–0)	South Carolina (4–1–0)	South Carolina (6–1–0)	Florida State (7–1–1)	Texas A&M (11–1–0)	Texas A&M (11–1–1)	UCLA (8–3–1)	UCLA (9–3–1)	Baylor (14–4–0)	Florida State (13–4–2)	Virginia (15–4–0)	10.
11.	Princeton	South Carolina (2–0–0)	Oklahoma State (3–0–0)	Texas (4–0–1)	Texas (6–0–1)	Tennessee (6–1–1)	Georgetown (8–0–2)	Boston College (11–1–0)	Duke (10–2–2)	Duke (11–2–2)	West Virginia (11–3–3)	Duke (14–3–2)	Duke (14–3–2)	11.
12.	Baylor	Princeton (0–0–0)	NC State (3–0–1)	Washington State (4–0–0)	Washington State (5–0–0)	Washington State (7–0–0)	Oklahoma State (10–1–0)	Virginia (9–2–0)	Vanderbilt (13–1–0)	Vanderbilt (13–1–1)	Texas (13–2–2)	Vanderbilt (15–2–1)	Baylor (15–5–0)	12.
13.	Texas A&M	California (1–0–0)	Tennessee (3–0–1)	Auburn (6–0–0)	Auburn (7–0–0)	Auburn (9–0–0)	Colorado (9–0–1)	Texas (9–1–2)	Santa Clara (12–2–1)	Santa Clara (12–2–1)	Penn State (13–5–0)	Texas A&M (15–3–1)	BYU (13–4–1)	13.
14.	South Carolina	Santa Clara (1–0–0)	South Carolina (3–1–0)	Northwestern (4–0–1)	Northwestern (6–0–1)	Duke (7–1–1)	UCLA (5–2–1)	Colorado (9–0–3)	Tennessee (10–2–1)	Tennessee (10–2–2)	Florida State (12–3–2)	BYU (12–4–1)	Memphis (17–3–0)	14.
15.	Georgetown	NC State (1–0–0)	California (2–1–0)	Penn State (3–2–0)	Princeton (5–1–0)	Georgetown (7–0–2)	South Carolina (8–2–0)	UCLA (6–3–1)	Washington State (10–2–0)	Baylor (12–4–0)	Virginia (13–3–0)	USF (13–2–0)	Vanderbilt (15–3–1)	15.
16.	California	Tennessee (2–0–0)	Butler (3–0–0)	Princeton (3–1–0)	Duke (6–1–1)	NC State (7–1–1)	Florida State (8–2–1)	Duke (8–2–2)	Florida State (10–3–1)	West Virginia (9–3–3)	Texas A&M (14–3–1)	Santa Clara (15–3–1)	Santa Clara (16–3–1)	16.
17.	Santa Clara	Notre Dame (2–0–0)	Texas (2–0–1)	Santa Clara (4–1–0)	Georgetown (5–0–2)	Oklahoma State (8–1–0)	Duke (8–2–1)	Vanderbilt (11–1–0)	Memphis (12–1–0)	Texas (11–2–2)	South Carolina (12–3–1)	West Virginia (12–4–3)	South Carolina (13–5–1)	17.
18.	NC State	West Virginia (0–1–1)	Washington State (3–0–0)	Duke (4–1–1)	USF (4–1–0)	Penn State (5–3–0)	Auburn (9–1–1)	West Virginia (7–2–3)	Baylor (11–4–0)	Penn State (11–5–0)	Colorado (13–1–3)	Texas Tech (13–4–2)	Texas A&M (15–4–1)	18.
19.	Tennessee	Illinois (1–1–0)	Auburn (4–0–0)	Georgetown (4–0–2)	NC State (6–1–1)	USF (4–1–0)	USF (4–1–0)	Auburn (9–2–1)	West Virginia (8–3–3)	Auburn (11–3–1)	USF (12–2–0)	Texas (13–3–3)	USF (14–3–0)	19.
20.	UCF	UCF (0–0–0)	Baylor (3–1–0)	USF (3–1–0)	Oklahoma State (6–1–0)	Wisconsin (7–1–1)	Vanderbilt (10–1–0)	Virginia Tech (7–2–3)	Texas (10–2–2)	Wisconsin (11–2–3)	Rutgers (11–2–5)	South Carolina (12–4–1)	Texas Tech (13–5–2)	20.
21.	Notre Dame	Texas (1–0–0)	Florida (2–2–0)	Kansas (5–0–1)	Butler (6–1–0)	TCU (7–1–1)	NC State (8–2–1)	Memphis (10–1–0)	Auburn (10–3–1)	Washington State (10–3–0)	Boston College (13–3–1)	Memphis (15–3–0)	Texas (13–3–3)	21.
22.	Pepperdine	Washington State (2–0–0)	USF (2–1–0)	Wake Forest (3–1–1)	Illinois (4–2–0)	Colorado (8–0–1)	Princeton (6–2–1)	Nebraska (8–3–3)	Rutgers (9–1–4)	Florida State (10–3–2)	Wisconsin (12–3–3)	Clemson (12–7–0)	LSU (13–6–3)	22.
23.	Texas	Oklahoma State (1–0–0)	West Virginia (0–1–3)	Illinois (4–2–0)	Penn State (4–3–0)	Boston College (8–0–0)	West Virginia (6–2–3)	Princeton (6–2–2)	Wisconsin (10–2–3)	USF (10–2–0)	Memphis (14–3–0)	Colorado (13–3–3)	Princeton (11–3–2)	23.
24.	Washington State	Duke (1–1–0)	Duke (2–1–1)	Oklahoma State (4–1–0)	Kansas (5–0–2)	Princeton (5–2–1)	Louisville (9–1–0)	Oklahoma State (10–2–1)	Clemson (9–5–0)	Rutgers (9–2–5)	Arkansas (11–3–3)	Princeton (10–3–2)	Clemson (12–8–0)	24.
25.	Oklahoma State	Georgetown (1–0–1)	Georgetown (2–0–2)	Butler (4–1–0)	Northwestern (6–0–1)	Arizona (7–1–0)	Mississippi State (8–2–0)	Arizona (8–2–1)	Mississippi State (9–3–1)	Mississippi State (9–4–1)	Princeton (9–3–2)	Boston College (14–4–1)	Boston College (14–4–1)	25.
	Preseason Aug. 16	Week 1 Aug. 21	Week 2 Aug. 28	Week 3 Sep. 4	Week 4 Sep. 11	Week 5 Sep. 18	Week 6 Sep. 25	Week 7 Oct 2.	Week 8 Oct. 9	Week 9 Oct. 16	Week 10 Oct. 23	Week 11 Oct. 30	Final Nov. 6	
		Dropped: No. 22 Pepperdine	Dropped: No. 17 Notre Dame; No. 19 Illinois; No. 20 UCF	Dropped: No. 15 California; No. 20 Baylor; No. 21 Florida; No. 23 West Virginia	Dropped: No. 22 Wake Forest	Dropped: No. 14 Northwestern; No. 21 Butler; No. 22 Illinois; No. 24 Kansas; No. 25 Northwestern	Dropped: No. 18 Penn State; No. 20 Wisconsin; No. 21 TCU; No. 25 Arizona	Dropped: No. 19 USF; No. 21 NC State; No. 24 Louisville; No. 25 Mississippi State	Dropped: No. 19 Auburn; No. 20 Virginia Tech; No. 22 Nebraska; No. 23 Princeton; No. 25 Arizona	Dropped: No. 17 Memphis; No. 24 Clemson	Dropped: No. 19 Auburn; No. 21 Washington State; No. 25 Mississippi State	Dropped: No. 20 Rutgers; No. 22 Wisconsin; No. 24 Arkansas	Dropped: No. 23 Colorado	

== Top Drawer Soccer ==
	Preseason Jul. 25	Week 1 Aug. 13	Week 2 Aug. 20	Week 3 Aug. 27	Week 4 Sep. 3	Week 5 Sep. 10	Week 6 Sep. 17	Week 7 Sep. 24	Week 8 Oct. 1	Week 9 Oct. 8	Week 10 Oct. 15	Week 11 Oct. 22	Week 12 Oct. 29	Week 13 Nov. 5	Week 14 Nov. 12	Week 15 Nov. 19	Week 16 Nov. 26	Final Dec. 3	
1.	Stanford	Stanford	Stanford (1–0–0)	Stanford (2–0–0)	Stanford (4–0–0)	Stanford (6–0–0)	Stanford (7–0–1)	Stanford (8–0–1)	Stanford (10–0–1)	Stanford (12–0–1)	Stanford (12–0–1)	Stanford (14–0–1)	Stanford (15–0–2)	Stanford (17–0–2)	Stanford (18–0–2)	Stanford (20–0–2)	Stanford (21–0–2)	Florida State (21–4–3)	1.
2.	UCLA	UCLA	UCLA (1–0–0)	UCLA (2–0–0)	Virginia (5–0–0)	Virginia (7–0–0)	Virginia (7–0–0)	USC (8–0–1)	North Carolina (9–2–1)	North Carolina (11–2–1)	North Carolina (12–2–1)	North Carolina (14–2–1)	North Carolina (16–2–1)	Georgetown (17–0–3)	Georgetown (18–0–3)	Georgetown (20–0–3)	Georgetown (21–0–3)	North Carolina (22–4–1)	2.
3.	North Carolina	North Carolina	North Carolina (2–0–0)	North Carolina (3–0–1)	Florida State (5–0–1)	Florida State (7–0–1)	Texas A&M (10–0–0)	Virginia (8–1–0)	USC (9–1–1)	USC (11–1–1)	USC (12–1–1)	USC (14–1–1)	USC (15–1–2)	UCLA (14–3–1)	UCLA (15–3–1)	UCLA (17–3–1)	Florida State (19–4–3)	Stanford (21–1–2)	3.
4.	Florida	Florida	Florida (2–0–0)	Virginia (4–0–0)	Texas A&M (7–0–0)	Texas A&M (8–0–0)	USC (7–0–1)	Texas A&M (11–1–0)	Texas A&M (11–1–1)	Texas A&M (13–1–1)	Texas A&M (14–1–1)	Georgetown (15–0–2)	Georgetown (15–0–3)	Florida State (15–4–2)	Florida State (16–4–2)	Florida State (17–4–3)	North Carolina (21–3–1)	Georgetown (21–1–3)	4.
5.	Virginia	Virginia	Virginia (2–0–0)	Florida State (4–0–0)	USC (4–0–1)	USC (6–0–1)	UCLA (5–1–1)	North Carolina (8–2–1)	Washington State (10–0–0)	Georgetown (12–0–2)	Georgetown (13–0–2)	UCLA (11–3–1)	UCLA (13–3–1)	USC (15–2–2)	USC (16–2–2)	North Carolina (20–3–1)	UCLA (17–4–1)	UCLA (17–4–1)	5.
6.	Penn State	Penn State	Penn State (2–0–0)	Texas A&M (4–0–0)	UCLA (2–1–1)	UCLA (3–1–1)	South Carolina (7–1–0)	Texas (9–0–1)	Santa Clara (10–1–1)	Virginia (11–2–0)	Virginia (12–2–0)	Duke (13–2–2)	Virginia (15–3–0)	North Carolina (17–3–1)	North Carolina (18–3–1)	Tennessee (16–3–2)	Tennessee (16–4–2)	Tennessee (16–4–2)	6.
7.	Duke	Duke	South Carolina (2–0–0)	USC (3–0–0)	South Carolina (4–1–0)	South Carolina (7–1–0)	Duke (7–1–1)	Santa Clara (9–1–1)	Georgetown (10–0–2)	South Carolina (11–2–0)	South Carolina (11–2–1)	Vanderbilt (15–1–1)	Texas A&M (15–3–1)	Virginia (15–4–0)	Virginia (16–4–0)	Penn State (18–6–0)	Penn State (18–7–0)	Penn State (18–7–0)	7.
8.	South Carolina	South Carolina	Florida State (2–0–0)	Santa Clara (2–0–0)	Duke (5–1–1)	Duke (6–1–1)	North Carolina (6–2–1)	Washington State (8–0–0)	Virginia (9–2–0)	UCLA (8–3–1)	UCLA (9–3–1)	Santa Clara (14–2–1)	Tennessee (13–2–2)	Texas A&M (15–4–1)	Texas A&M (16–4–1)	Baylor (20–5–0)	Baylor (20–6–0)	Baylor (20–6–0)	8.
9.	Florida State	Florida State	Texas A&M (2–0–0)	Penn State (2–1–0)	Tennessee (5–0–1)	North Carolina (5–2–1)	Florida State (7–1–1)	Georgetown (8–0–2)	South Carolina (9–2–0)	Duke (10–2–2)	Duke (11–2–2)	Virginia (13–3–0)	Duke (14–3–2)	Princeton (11–3–2)	Princeton (11–4–2)	Virginia (17–5–0)	Virginia (17–5–0)	Virginia (17–5–0)	9.
10.	Texas A&M	Texas A&M	USC (1–0–0)	South Carolina (3–1–0)	Texas (4–0–1)	Tennessee (6–0–1)	Texas (8–0–1)	South Carolina (8–2–0)	Tennessee (9–1–1)	Vanderbilt (13–1–0)	Vanderbilt (13–1–1)	South Carolina (12–3–1)	Texas (14–3–2)	Duke (14–3–2)	Duke (15–3–2)	USC (17–3–2)	USC (17–3–2)	USC (17–3–2)	10.
11.	USC	USC	Duke (1–1–0)	Duke (2–1–1)	Santa Clara (4–1–0)	Texas (6–0–1)	Santa Clara (7–1–1)	Tennessee (8–1–1)	Texas (9–1–2)	Washington State (10–2–0)	Santa Clara (12–2–1)	Tennessee (12–2–2)	USF (13–2–0)	Tennessee (13–2–3)	Tennessee (14–3–2)	Texas A&M (17–5–1)	Texas A&M (17–5–1)	Texas A&M (17–5–1)	11.
12.	Princeton	Princeton	Princeton (0–0–0)	Princeton (2–0–0)	North Carolina (5–0–1)	Santa Clara (6–1–0)	Washington State (7–0–0)	UCLA (5–2–1)	Florida State (9–2–1)	Boston College (13–1–0)	Washington State (10–3–0)	Texas (13–2–2)	Florida State (13–4–2)	Santa Clara (16–3–1)	Santa Clara (17–3–1)	Duke (16–4–2)	Duke (16–4–2)	Duke (16–4–2)	12.
13.	West Virginia	West Virginia	Santa Clara (1–0–0)	Oklahoma State (3–0–0)	Washington State (4–0–0)	Washington State (5–0–0)	Georgetown (7–0–2)	Duke (8–2–1)	UCLA (6–3–1)	Santa Clara (11–2–1)	Texas (11–2–2)	Texas A&M (13–2–2)	Vanderbilt (15–2–1)	Texas (14–4–2)	West Virginia (15–4–3)	Santa Clara (17–4–1)	Santa Clara (17–4–1)	Santa Clara (17–4–1)	13.
14.	Santa Clara	Santa Clara	UCF (0–0–0)	Tennessee (3–0–1)	Georgetown (4–0–2)	Georgetown (5–0–2)	Tennessee (6–1–1)	Boston College (10–0–0)	Duke (8–2–2)	Tennessee (10–2–1)	Boston College (13–1–1)	USF (12–2–0)	Princeton (10–3–2)	Saint Louis (18–3–1)	USF (15–3–0)	Wisconsin (14–4–4)	Wisconsin (14–4–4)	Wisconsin (14–4–4)	14.
15.	UCF	UCF	Tennessee (2–0–0)	NC State (3–0–1)	Auburn (6–0–0)	Auburn (7–0–0)	Auburn (9–0–0)	Florida State (8–2–1)	Vanderbilt (11–1–0)	Texas (10–2–2)	Colorado (12–0–3)	Florida State (12–3–2)	Santa Clara (15–3–1)	West Virginia (14–4–3)	Vanderbilt (16–3–1)	West Virginia (15–5–3)	West Virginia (15–5–3)	West Virginia (15–5–3)	15.
16.	NC State	NC State	NC State (1–0–0)	Texas (2–0–1)	Princeton (3–1–0)	Princeton (5–1–0)	USF (4–1–0)	USF (4–1–0)	Boston College (11–1–0)	Colorado (11–0–3)	Tennessee (10–2–2)	Princeton (9–3–2)	South Carolina (12–4–1)	Memphis (17–3–0)	South Carolina (14–5–1)	USF (15–4–0)	USF (15–4–0)	USF (15–4–0)	16.
17.	Tennessee	Tennessee	Notre Dame (2–0–0)	West Virginia (0–1–3)	USF (3–1–0)	USF (4–1–0)	NC State (7–1–1)	Oklahoma State (10–1–0)	Colorado (9–0–3)	Florida State (10–3–1)	USF (10–2–0)	Baylor (14–4–0)	Baylor (16–4–0)	USF (14–3–0)	Baylor (18–5–0)	Vanderbilt (16–4–1)	Vanderbilt (16–4–1)	Vanderbilt (16–4–1)	17.
18.	USF	USF	West Virginia (0–1–1)	Washington State (3–0–0)	NC State (5–0–1)	Butler (6–1–0)	Oklahoma State (8–1–0)	Colorado (9–0–1)	Mississippi State (8–2–1)	Memphis (12–1–0)	Florida State (10–3–2)	Memphis (14–3–0)	Memphis (15–3–0)	Vanderbilt (15–3–1)	LSU (16–6–1)	South Carolina (14–6–1)	South Carolina (14–6–1)	South Carolina (14–6–1)	18.
19.	Notre Dame	Notre Dame	Oklahoma State (1–0–0)	Butler (3–0–0)	Butler (4–1–0)	NC State (6–1–1)	Arizona (7–1–0)	Mississippi State (8–2–0)	Princeton (6–2–2)	Mississippi State (9–3–1)	Princeton (8–3–2)	West Virginia (11–3–3)	Penn State (14–5–0)	South Carolina (13–5–1)	Penn State (16–6–0)	LSU (16–7–1)	LSU (16–7–1)	LSU (16–7–1)	19.
20.	Oklahoma State	Oklahoma State	Baylor (2–0–0)	Georgetown (2–0–2)	Oklahoma State (4–1–0)	Oklahoma State (6–1–0)	Colorado (8–0–1)	Princeton (6–2–1)	Arizona (8–2–1)	Princeton (7–3–2)	Baylor (12–4–0)	Boston College (13–3–1)	Arizona State (10–5–1)	Baylor (17–5–0)	Washington State (13–5–1)	Washington State (13–6–1)	Washington State (13–6–1)	Washington State (13–6–1)	20.
21.	Arizona	Arizona	Texas (1–0–0)	Auburn (4–0–0)	Arizona (4–1–0)	Arizona (6–1–0)	Penn State (5–3–0)	Vanderbilt (10–1–0)	Nebraska (8–3–3)	Baylor (11–4–0)	Auburn (11–3–1)	Colorado (13–1–3)	West Virginia (12–4–3)	LSU (14–6–2)	Arizona (13–5–2)	NC State (12–7–3)	NC State (12–7–3)	NC State (12–7–3)	21.
22.	Baylor	Baylor	Washington State (2–0–0)	California (2–1–0)	Colorado (4–0–1)	Colorado (6–0–1)	Princeton (5–2–1)	Auburn (9–1–1)	Auburn (9–2–1)	Auburn (10–3–1)	Memphis (12–3–0)	Arkansas (11–3–3)	Boston College (14–4–1)	Penn State (15–5–1)	Wisconsin (13–3–4)	Arizona (13–6–2)	Arizona (13–6–2)	Arizona (13–6–2)	22.
23.	Pepperdine	Pepperdine	Georgetown (1–0–1)	Florida (2–2–0)	Penn State (3–2–0)	Penn State (4–3–0)	Vanderbilt (8–1–0)	Arizona (7–2–0)	Oklahoma State (10–2–1)	Oklahoma State (10–3–1)	West Virginia (9–3–3)	Penn State (13–5–0)	Colorado (13–3–3)	BYU (13–4–1)	Virginia Tech (10–7–3)	Virginia Tech (11–8–3)	Virginia Tech (11–8–3)	Virginia Tech (11–8–3)	23.
24.	Texas	Texas	California (1–0–0)	USF (2–1–0)	Kansas (5–0–1)	Kansas (5–0–2)	Texas Tech (8–1–0)	NC State (8–2–1)	Memphis (10–1–0)	USF (8–2–0)	Texas Tech (12–3–1)	North Texas (12–1–2)	Arkansas (11–4–3)	Arizona (12–5–2)	Hofstra (16–5–1)	Hofstra (16–6–1)	Hofstra (16–6–1)	Hofstra (16–6–1)	24.
25.	Washington State	Washington State	Auburn (2–0–0)	Notre Dame (3–1–0)	Wisconsin (4–1–0)	Wisconsin (6–1–0)	Wisconsin (7–1–1)	Louisville (9–1–0)	USF (6–2–0)	Kansas (9–2–2)	Mississippi State (9–4–1)	TCU (11–4–2)	BYU (12–4–1)	Boston College (14–4–1)	Arkansas (14–5–3)	Arkansas (14–6–3)	Arkansas (14–6–3)	Arkansas (14–6–3)	25.
	Preseason Jul. 25	Week 1 Aug. 13	Week 2 Aug. 20	Week 3 Aug. 27	Week 4 Sep. 3	Week 5 Sep. 10	Week 6 Sep. 17	Week 7 Sep. 24	Week 8 Oct. 1	Week 9 Oct. 8	Week 10 Oct. 15	Week 11 Oct. 22	Week 12 Oct. 29	Week 13 Nov. 5	Week 14 Nov. 12	Week 15 Nov. 19	Week 16 Nov. 26	Final Dec. 3	
		None	Dropped: No. 18 USF; No. 21 Arizona; No. 23 Pepperdine	Dropped: No. 15 UCF; No. 20 Baylor	Dropped: No.17 West Virginia; No. 22 California; No. 23 Florida; No. 25 Notre Dame	None	Dropped: No. 18 Butler; No. 24 Kansas	Dropped: No. 21 Penn State; No. 24 Texas Tech; No. 25 Wisconsin	Dropped: No 24. NC State; No. 25 Louisville	Dropped: No. 20 Arizona; No. 22 Nebraska	Dropped: No. 23 Oklahoma State; No. 25 Kansas	Dropped: No. 12 Washington State; No. 21 Auburn; No. 24 Texas Tech; No. 25 Mississippi State	Dropped: No. 24 North Texas; No. 25 TCU	Dropped: No. 20 Arizona State; No. 23 Colorado; No. 24 Arkansas	Dropped: No. 13 Texas; No. 14 Saint Louis; No. 16 Memphis; No.23 BYU; No. 25 Boston College	Dropped: No. 9 Princeton	None	None	
