= 2015 BYU Cougars women's soccer team =

American college soccer season

2015 BYU Cougars women's soccer
- Conference: West Coast Conference
- Record: 16–3–2 (7–1–1 WCC)
- Head coach: Jennifer Rockwood
- Home stadium: South Stadium

Uniform
Home	Away

2015 West Coast Conference women's soccer standings
	Conf.						Overall
Team	W		L		T	PCT	W		L		T	PCT
No. 13 BYU ‍†‍‍^{y}	7	–	1	–	1	.833	16	–	3	–	2	.810
San Francisco ‍‍‍	7	–	2	–	0	.778	13	–	4	–	3	.725
Loyola Marymount ‍‍‍^{y}	7	–	2	–	0	.778	14	–	5	–	1	.725
No. 12 Santa Clara ‍‍‍^{y}	6	–	1	–	2	.778	13	–	6	–	2	.667
Portland ‍‍‍	4	–	5	–	0	.444	8	–	11	–	0	.421
Pepperdine ‍‍‍	3	–	6	–	0	.333	8	–	9	–	2	.474
San Diego ‍‍‍	3	–	6	–	0	.333	5	–	13	–	2	.300
Saint Mary's ‍‍‍	2	–	5	–	2	.333	7	–	9	–	4	.450
Pacific ‍‍‍	2	–	7	–	0	.222	3	–	13	–	1	.206
Gonzaga ‍‍‍	1	–	7	–	1	.167	2	–	12	–	5	.237
† – Conference champion y- Invited to the NCAA Women's Soccer Championship; As of 2015-11-19; Rankings from NSCAA

The 2015 BYU Cougars women's soccer team represented BYU during the 2015 NCAA Division I women's soccer season. The Cougars were coached for a 21st consecutive season by Jennifer Rockwood, who was co-coach in 1995 and became the solo head coach in 1996. Before 1995 BYU women's soccer competed as a club team and not as a member of the NCAA. The Cougars enter the 2015 season having won three consecutive West Coast Conference championships and having made the NCAA Tournament each of the last three seasons and in 16 of the 20 seasons that Rockwood has been the head coach. The Cougars also come in having been picked to win the 2015 WCC women's soccer crown. On the last day of the season BYU won their fourth consecutive WCC soccer title to automatically qualify for the NCAA Tournament. BYU advanced to the second round of the College Cup where they were defeated by Stanford. BYU finished the season at 16–3–2.

== Media ==
=== Television & Internet Streaming ===
Every BYU women's soccer home games was shown live on BYUtv or TheW.tv. Information on these television broadcasts and other internet streams can be found below.

=== Nu Skin Cougar IMG Sports Network ===
For a second consecutive season the Cougar IMG Sports Network will air BYU Cougars women's soccer games. Greg Wrubell provided play-by-play for most games. Former men's assistant coach Hugh Van Wagenen (typically home games) and Colette Jepson Smith (typically road games) acted as analysts. Cougar IMG increased the number of games broadcast from 13 to at least 21. The Cougars also expanded their broadcast territory. After being solely online in 2014, Cougar IMG broadcasts began airing on ESPN 960, joining BYU baseball on the network. 20 of the 21 Cougar IMG broadcasts were streamed online at byucougars.com and on the ESPN 960 player. The UNLV match was available only on the ESPN 960 player. On September 24 BYU Radio also picked up the Cougar IMG broadcasts, simulcasting 8 of the matches, giving the Cougars nationwide coverage on Sirius XM 143 and on Dish Network.

== Schedule ==
*- Denotes WCC game
x- Denotes Cougar IMG Sports Network/ESPN 960 broadcast
y- Television Broadcast
z- Internet Stream

=== x-Exhibition: Blue/White Classic ===
Broadcasters: Greg Wrubell & Amber Wadsworth (ESPN 960)

August 11, 2015	Blue	3–0	White	Provo, UT
7:05 p.m. MDT	Nadia Gomes 38'; Elena Medeiros 46'; Michele Murphy Vasconcelos 69'	Summary		Stadium: South Stadium; Attendance: N/A

=== xy-Exhibition: Arizona ===
Series History: BYU leads series 10–1–1
Broadcasters: Spencer Linton, Natalyn Lewis, & Lauren Francom (BYUtv)
Greg Wrubell & Hugh Van Wagenen (ESPN 960)

August 15, 2015	Arizona Wildcats	2–3	#19 BYU Cougars	Provo, UT
7:00 p.m. MDT	Lexe Selman 44'; Laura Pimienta 50'	Summary	Miranda Bailey (yellow card) 7'; Ashley Hatch 15'; Brittain Dearden 36'; Paige Hunt 54'	Stadium: South Stadium; Attendance: 1,621; Referee: Karen Abt; Assistant referees: Brandon Major; Kristi Mak; Fourth official: T.J. Zablocki

=== x-Outrigger Resorts Soccer Classic: #18 California ===
Series History: BYU leads series 3–1
Broadcasters: Greg Wrubell & Colette Jepson Smith (ESPN 960)

August 21, 2015 1	#18 California Golden Bears	0–2	#19 BYU Cougars	Waipahu, HI
8:30 p.m. MDT	Guro Bergsvand (yellow card) 72'	Summary	Elena Medeiros 9'; Maddie Siddoway (yellow card) 69'; Ashley Hatch 74'	Stadium: Waipio Peninsula Soccer Stadium; Attendance: N/A; Referee: Michael Terry; Assistant referees: Alex Dahlman; Brandon Rivera

=== xy-Colorado ===
Series History: BYU leads series 3–2–1
Broadcasters: Spencer Linton, Natalyn Lewis, & Lauren Francom (BYUtv/BYU Radio)
Greg Wrubell & Hugh Van Wagenen (ESPN 960)

August 28, 2015 2	Colorado Buffaloes	0–2	#11 BYU Cougars	Provo, UT
7:00 p.m. MDT		Summary	Elena Medeiros 13'; Nadia Gomes 28'	Stadium: South Stadium; Attendance: 5,589; Referee: Hamed Sadeghi; Assistant referees: Jeff Young; Brad Jensen; Fourth official: Blake Griffiths

=== xz-Nebraska ===
Series History: Nebraska leads series 3–1
Broadcasters: (Huskers NSide {$- subscription service})- video only
Greg Wrubell & Colette Jepson Smith (ESPN 960)

August 31, 2015 3	#11 BYU Cougars	2–0	Nebraska Cornhuskers	Lincoln, NE
6:00 p.m. MDT	Ashley Hatch 16'; Elena Medeiros (yellow card) 55'; Michele Murphy Vasconcelos 76'	Summary	Courtney Claasen (yellow card) 53'	Stadium: Barbara Hibner Stadium; Attendance: 1,348; Referee: Shane Butler; Assistant referees: Jim McVay; Vehis Reis; Fourth official: Bobby Simetich

=== xy-Utah/Deseret First Duel ===
Series History: BYU leads series 19–7–1
Broadcasters: Spencer Linton, Natalyn Lewis, & Lauren Francom (BYUtv/BYU Radio)
Robbie Bullough & Erica Owens (ESPN 960)

September 4, 2015 4	Utah Utes	0–2	#9 BYU Cougars	Provo, UT
7:00 p.m. MDT		Summary	Madie Siddoway 14'; Nadia Gomes 22'	Stadium: South Stadium; Attendance: 5,620; Referee: Leszek Stalmach; Assistant referees: T.J. Zablocki; Schuyler Pack; Fourth official: Scott Reynolds

=== x-Stanford ===
Series History: BYU leads series 3–1
Broadcasters: Greg Wrubell & Jennie Smith (ESPN 960)
BYU and Stanford were scheduled to play each other in the final match of the Outrigger Resorts Soccer Classic, but mother nature had other plans. Rain from Tropical Depression Kilo caused massive flooding and made the pitch unplayable. The two teams decided to reschedule with a home-and-home series beginning in Stanford September 7.

September 7, 2015 5	#9 BYU Cougars	0–1	#2 Stanford Cardinal	Stanford, CA
8:00 p.m. MDT		Summary	Jordan DiBiasi 32'	Stadium: Maloney Field at Laird Q. Cagan Stadium; Attendance: 1,177; Referee: Ian Anderson; Assistant referees: Chris Hutchison; Manny Uche; Fourth official: Tieron Oz

=== xy-Utah State ===
Series History: BYU leads series 11–0
Broadcasters: Spencer Linton, Natalyn Lewis, & Lauren Francom (BYUtv)
Greg Wrubell & Hugh Van Wagenen (ESPN 960)

September 10, 2015 6	Utah State Aggies	0–1	#5 BYU Cougars	Provo, UT
7:00 p.m. MDT	Wesley Hamblin (yellow card) 87'	Summary	Bizzy Phillips 87'	Stadium: South Stadium; Attendance: 4,006; Referee: Allen Chapman; Assistant referees: Mitch Lillywhite; Jay Hutchinson; Fourth official: Karsten Gillwald

=== x-UNLV ===
Series History: BYU leads series 14–1–1
Broadcasters: Robbie Bullough & Hugh Van Wagenen (ESPN 960)

September 12, 2015 7	UNLV Rebels	0–2	#5 BYU Cougars	Provo, UT
6:00 p.m. MDT	Denali Murnan (yellow card) 50'	Summary	Michele Murphy Vasconcelos 46'; Taylor Campbell Isom 81'	Stadium: South Stadium; Attendance: 2,298; Referee: Brad Jensen; Assistant referees: Jeff Young; Brandon Major; Fourth official: Blake Griffiths

=== xy-Oregon State ===
Series History: BYU leads series 1–0
Broadcasters: Spencer Linton, Natalyn Lewis, & Lauren Francom (BYUtv)
Greg Wrubell & Hugh Van Wagenen (ESPN 960)

September 17, 2015 8	Oregon State Beavers	0–1	#8 BYU Cougars	Provo, UT
7:00 p.m. MDT		Summary	Ashley Hatch 13'	Stadium: South Stadium; Attendance: 3,449; Referee: Tyler Ploeger; Assistant referees: T.J. Zablocki; Alan Jimenez; Fourth official: Michael Anglin

=== xz-Cal Poly ===
Series History: BYU leads series 4–0–1
Broadcasters: Dave Grant (BigWest.tv)
Greg Wrubell & Colette Jepson Smith (ESPN 960/BYU Radio)

September 24, 2015 9	#6 BYU Cougars	1–1	Cal Poly Mustangs	San Luis Obispo, CA
8:00 p.m. MDT	Elena Medeiros 20'; Bizzy Phillips (yellow card) 90'; Michele Murphy Vasconcelos (yellow card) 99'	Summary	Elise Krieghoff 5'	Stadium: Alex G. Spanos Stadium; Attendance: 871; Referee: Alex Gorin; Assistant referees: Tyler Baxter-McDonald; Brandon Brooks; Fourth official: Paul Clock

=== x-Long Beach State ===
Series History: BYU leads series 5–2
Broadcasters: Kevin Nielsen & Colette Jepson Smith (ESPN 960)

September 26, 2015 10	#6 BYU Cougars	2–1	Long Beach State 49ers	Long Beach, CA
8:00 p.m. MDT	Elena Mederios 13'; Ashley Hatch 74'	Summary	Ashley Gonzales 69' (pen.); Melanie Fox (yellow card) 71'	Stadium: George Allen Field; Attendance: 1,411; Referee: Michael Radchuk; Assistant referees: Shaine Danbeli; Melissa Gonzales; Fourth official: Vince Apple-Chiarella

=== xz-*Gonzaga ===
Series History: BYU leads series 7–0
Broadcasters: Video only (TheW.tv)
Greg Wrubell & Colette Jepson Smith (ESPN 960/BYU Radio)

October 1, 2015 11	#6 BYU Cougars	1–0	Gonzaga Bulldogs	Spokane, WA
5:00 p.m. MDT	Nadia Gomes 70'	Summary		Stadium: Luger Field/Gonzaga Soccer Stadium; Attendance: 509; Referee: Said Ravanfar; Assistant referees: Matthew Hamlin; Tony Richardson; Fourth official: Saeed Askar

=== xz-*Portland ===
Series History: BYU leads series 5–4
Broadcasters: Adam Linnman & Erin Dees (TheW.tv)
Greg Wrubell & Colette Jepson Smith (ESPN 960/BYU Radio)

October 3, 2015 12	#6 BYU Cougars	2–1	Portland Pilots	Portland, OR
8:00 p.m. MDT	Elena Mederios 8'; Nadia Gomes 41'	Summary	Own Goal 15' (o.g.); Haylee DeGrood (yellow card) 36'	Stadium: Merlo Field; Attendance: 2,206; Referee: Michael Radchuk; Assistant referees: Cephas Quartson; Liberty Siegel; Fourth official: Stephanie Tercero

=== xz-*San Diego ===
Series History: BYU leads series 5–2
Broadcasters: Spencer Linton, Natalyn Lewis, & Lauren Francom (BYUtv)
Greg Wrubell & Hugh Van Wagenen (ESPN 960/BYU Radio)

October 9, 2015 13	San Diego Toreros	0–1	#5 BYU Cougars	Provo, UT
7:00 p.m. MDT	Caitlyn Kretzschmar (yellow card) 55'	Summary	Sarah Chambers Gardner 83'	Stadium: South Stadium; Attendance: 4,284; Referee: Farhad Dadkho; Assistant referees: Scott Reynolds; Schuyler Pack; Fourth official: Alan Jimenez

=== xy-*Pacific ===
Series History: BYU leads series 5–1
Broadcasters: Spencer Linton, Natalyn Lewis, & Lauren Francom (BYUtv)
Greg Wrubell & Hugh Van Wagenen (ESPN 960/BYU Radio)

October 17, 2015 14	Pacific Tigers	0–2	#5 BYU Cougars	Provo, UT
7:05 p.m. MDT		Summary	Nadia Gomes 6'; Michele Murphy Vasconcelos 24'	Stadium: South Stadium; Attendance: 3,255; Referee: Charlie Delgadillo; Assistant referees: Hamed Sadeghi; Brandon Major; Fourth official: Mike Anglin

=== xz-*San Francisco ===
Series History: BYU leads series 6–0
Broadcasters: George Devine & Joe Dugan (TheW.tv)
Greg Wrubell & Colette Jepson Smith (ESPN 960/BYU Radio)

October 22, 2014 15	#5 BYU Cougars	1–2	San Francisco Dons	San Francisco, CA
8:00 p.m. MDT	Madie Lyons 15'	Summary	Micaela Mercado 71' (pen.); Jessica Nakae 82'	Stadium: Negoesco Stadium; Attendance: 400; Referee: Denis Vargas; Assistant referees: Troy Thiele; Vince Cortes; Fourth official: Michael LaFleur

=== z-*Santa Clara ===
Series History: Santa Clara leads series 6–1–2
Broadcasters: David Gentile (TheW.tv)

October 24, 2015 16	#5 BYU Cougars	0–0	#20 Santa Clara Broncos	Santa Clara, CA
2:00 p.m. MDT		Summary		Stadium: Buck Shaw Stadium; Attendance: 600; Referee: Chris Calderon; Assistant referees: Elijio Arreguin; Alex Marquand-Willse; Fourth official: Eder Del Angel

=== xy-*Pepperdine ===
Series History: Series even 3–3
Broadcasters: Jarom Jordan, Natalyn Lewis, & Lauren Francom (BYUtv)
Greg Wrubell & Hugh Van Wagenen (ESPN 960/BYU Radio)

October 29, 2015 17	Pepperdine Waves	0–3	#13 BYU Cougars	Provo, UT
7:00 p.m. MDT		Summary	Elena Medeiros 32', 78'; Brittain Dearden 47'	Stadium: South Stadium; Attendance: 1,825; Referee: Leszek Stalmach; Assistant referees: Scott Reynolds; Brad Jensen; Fourth official: Jeff Young

=== xy-*Loyola Marymount ===
Series History: BYU leads series 5–1
Broadcasters: Spencer Linton, Natalyn Lewis, & Lauren Francom (BYUtv)
Greg Wrubell & Hugh Van Wagenen (ESPN 960/BYU Radio)

October 31, 2015 18	Loyola Marymount Lions	0–2	#13 BYU Cougars	Provo, UT
7:00 p.m. MDT		Summary	Nadia Gomes 53', 53'	Stadium: South Stadium; Attendance: 1,578; Referee: Eder del Angel; Assistant referees: Blake Griffiths; Kristi Mak; Fourth official: Scott Reynolds

=== xz-*Saint Mary's ===
Series History: BYU leads series 4–0–1
Broadcasters: Robbie Bullough & Amber Wadsworth (TheW.tv)
Greg Wrubell & Hugh Van Wagenen (ESPN 960)

November 7, 2015 19	Saint Mary's Gaels	1–4	#13 BYU Cougars	Provo, UT
5:00 p.m. MST	Madison Salom 73'	Summary	Madie Lyons 11', 74'; Nadia Gomes 27', 31'; Bizzy Phillips (yellow card) 48'	Stadium: South Stadium; Attendance: 2,899; Referee: Tim Ford; Assistant referees: Mitch Lillywhite; Jay Hutchinson; Fourth official: Brandon Major

=== xy-College Cup: Utah Valley ===
Series History: BYU leads series 1–0
Broadcasters: Spencer Linton, Natalyn Lewis, & Lauren Francom (BYUtv)
Robbie Bullough & Hugh Van Wagenen (ESPN 960)

November 14, 2015 20	Utah Valley Wolverines	0–1	#13 BYU Cougars	Provo, UT
1:00 p.m. MST	Kali Stubbs (yellow card) 59'; Lexi Felis (yellow card) 63'	Summary	Elena Medeiros 23'; Paige Hunt (yellow card) 27'	Stadium: South Stadium; Attendance: 3,663; Referee: Hamed Sadeghi; Assistant referees: Jason Hutchinson; Scott Reynolds; Fourth official: Kevin King

=== x-College Cup: Stanford ===
Series History: Stanford leads series 4–3
Broadcasters: Jack Follman and Kevin Denny (Pac-12.com)
Greg Wrubell & Colette Jepson Smith (ESPN 960/BYU Radio)

November 19, 2015 21	#13 BYU Cougars	1–2	#3 Stanford Cardinal	Stanford, CA
7:00 p.m. PST	Bizzy Phillips 46' (pen.)	Summary	Jordan DiBiasi 28', 75'	Stadium: Maloney Field at Laird Q. Cagan Stadium; Attendance: 1,223; Referee: Frank Anderson; Assistant referees: Albert Montalvo; Brian Yip; Fourth official: Troy Thiele

== Roster ==
No.	Position	Player	Height	Hometown	Year
1	GK	Rachel Boaz	5 ft 10 in (178 cm)	Murrieta, CA	Junior
2	D	Taylor Campbell Isom	5 ft 7 in (170 cm)	Sandy, UT	Sophomore
3	F	Carla Swensen	5 ft 3 in (160 cm)	South Jordan, UT	Sophomore
4	MF, D	Brittain Dearden	5 ft 9 in (175 cm)	Mercer, NJ	Sophomore
5	MF	Marissa Nimmer Linehan	5 ft 6 in (168 cm)	Orem, UT	Senior
6	F	Nadia Gomes	5 ft 6 in (168 cm)	Sandy, UT	Sophomore
7	F, MF	Michele Murphy Vasconcelos	5 ft 5 in (165 cm)	Sandy, UT	RS Junior
9	D	Paige Hunt	5 ft 7 in (170 cm)	Bountiful, UT	Junior
10	MF	Elisabeth "Bizzy" Phillips	5 ft 4 in (163 cm)	Sandy, UT	Sophomore
11	GK	Hannah Clark	5 ft 10 in (178 cm)	Danville, CA	RS Sophomore
12	D	Avery Calton	5 ft 7 in (170 cm)	Ogden, UT	RS Sophomore
13	MF	Courtnee Wood	6 ft 0 in (183 cm)	Layton, UT	Sophomore
18	GK	Sabrina Macias	5 ft 5 in (165 cm)	Littleton, CO	Freshman
19	F, MF	Sarah Chambers Gardner	5 ft 2 in (157 cm)	Medford, OR	Senior
20	MF	Jocelyn Loomis	5 ft 4 in (163 cm)	Sandy, UT	Sophomore
21	MF	Madie Siddoway	5 ft 9 in (175 cm)	North Logan, UT	Freshman
22	MF, D	Miranda Bailey	5 ft 7 in (170 cm)	Loomis, CA	RS Junior
24	MF	Stephanie Ringwood	5 ft 9 in (175 cm)	Cottonwood Heights, UT	Sophomore
25	D	Camille Green Heath	5 ft 5 in (165 cm)	Bountiful, UT	Junior
26	F	Madie Lyons	5 ft 8 in (173 cm)	Sandy, UT	Sophomore
27	MF	Elena Medeiros	5 ft 3 in (160 cm)	Bountiful, UT	Junior
32	GK	Cassidy Smith	5 ft 10 in (178 cm)	Alpine, UT	Freshman
33	F	Ashley Hatch	5 ft 9 in (175 cm)	Gilbert, AZ	Junior
34	MF	Brianna Hatch	5 ft 8 in (173 cm)	Gilbert, AZ	Freshman
