= 2014 NCAA Division I women's soccer season =

NCAA Division I women's soccer
- Season: 2014
- Champions: Florida State Seminoles (1st title)

The 2014 NCAA Division I women's soccer season was the 33rd season of NCAA championship women's college soccer. The UCLA Bruins were the defending national champions.

== Season overview ==
=== Standings ===
2014 American Athletic Conference women's soccer standings
| | Conf. | | | | | | Overall |
| Team | W | | L | | T | PCT | W | | L | | T | PCT |
|---|---|---|---|---|---|---|---|---|---|---|---|---|
| No. 19 UCF ‍†‍‍^{y} | 8 | – | 1 | – | 0 | .889 | 16 | – | 4 | – | 0 | .800 |
| Memphis ‍‍‍ | 6 | – | 1 | – | 2 | .778 | 9 | – | 6 | – | 4 | .579 |
| USF ‍‍‍^{y} | 6 | – | 3 | – | 0 | .667 | 13 | – | 6 | – | 2 | .667 |
| UConn ‍‍‡‍^{y} | 4 | – | 2 | – | 3 | .611 | 13 | – | 4 | – | 5 | .705 |
| Tulsa ‍‍‍ | 4 | – | 4 | – | 1 | .500 | 11 | – | 8 | – | 2 | .571 |
| Cincinnati ‍‍‍ | 4 | – | 5 | – | 0 | .444 | 10 | – | 8 | – | 2 | .550 |
| East Carolina ‍‍‍ | 4 | – | 5 | – | 0 | .444 | 12 | – | 8 | – | 1 | .595 |
| Temple ‍‍‍ | 3 | – | 5 | – | 1 | .389 | 11 | – | 8 | – | 1 | .575 |
| SMU ‍‍‍ | 2 | – | 7 | – | 0 | .222 | 7 | – | 14 | – | 0 | .333 |
| Houston ‍‍‍ | 0 | – | 8 | – | 1 | .056 | 1 | – | 11 | – | 5 | .206 |
† – Conference champion ‡ – 2014 AAC Tourney champion: y- Invited to the NCAA Division I Women's Soccer Championship As of November 16, 2014 Rankings from NSCAA

2014 Atlantic Sun Conference women's soccer standings
| | Conf. | | | | | | Overall |
| Team | W | | L | | T | PCT | W | | L | | T | PCT |
|---|---|---|---|---|---|---|---|---|---|---|---|---|
| FGCU ‍†‍‡‍^{y} | 7 | – | 0 | – | 0 | 1.000 | 17 | – | 3 | – | 0 | .850 |
| Lipscomb ‍‍‍ | 4 | – | 2 | – | 1 | .643 | 10 | – | 7 | – | 2 | .579 |
| Jacksonville ‍‍‍ | 4 | – | 3 | – | 0 | .571 | 10 | – | 8 | – | 1 | .553 |
| Northern Kentucky* ‍‍‍ | 3 | – | 3 | – | 1 | .500 | 9 | – | 8 | – | 3 | .525 |
| North Florida ‍‍‍ | 3 | – | 3 | – | 1 | .500 | 5 | – | 12 | – | 1 | .306 |
| Kennesaw State ‍‍‍ | 3 | – | 3 | – | 2 | .500 | 9 | – | 9 | – | 2 | .500 |
| Stetson ‍‍‍ | 2 | – | 5 | – | 0 | .286 | 5 | – | 12 | – | 1 | .306 |
| USC Upstate ‍‍‍ | 0 | – | 6 | – | 1 | .071 | 3 | – | 13 | – | 1 | .206 |
† – Conference champion ‡ – 2014 ASun Tourney champion: y- Invited to the NCAA Division I Women's Soccer Championship *-Ineligible for postseason play due to D1 transition As of November 16, 2014 Rankings from NSCAA

2014 America East Conference women's soccer standings
| | Conf. | | | | | | Overall |
| Team | W | | L | | T | PCT | W | | L | | T | PCT |
|---|---|---|---|---|---|---|---|---|---|---|---|---|
| Hartford ‍†‍‍ | 5 | – | 2 | – | 3 | .650 | 10 | – | 4 | – | 5 | .658 |
| UMBC ‍‍‍ | 4 | – | 2 | – | 2 | .625 | 12 | – | 4 | – | 3 | .711 |
| New Hampshire ‍‍‡‍^{y} | 4 | – | 2 | – | 2 | .625 | 8 | – | 4 | – | 4 | .625 |
| Albany ‍‍‍ | 3 | – | 2 | – | 3 | .563 | 7 | – | 9 | – | 5 | .452 |
| Maine ‍‍‍ | 2 | – | 1 | – | 4 | .571 | 4 | – | 8 | – | 6 | .389 |
| Binghamton ‍‍‍ | 3 | – | 3 | – | 2 | .500 | 7 | – | 9 | – | 3 | .447 |
| Stony Brook ‍‍‍ | 2 | – | 4 | – | 2 | .375 | 5 | – | 10 | – | 2 | .353 |
| UMass Lowell* ‍‍‍ | 2 | – | 5 | – | 1 | .313 | 5 | – | 13 | – | 1 | .289 |
| Vermont ‍‍‍ | 1 | – | 6 | – | 1 | .188 | 3 | – | 12 | – | 2 | .235 |
† – Conference champion ‡ – 2014 America East Tourney champion: y- Invited to the NCAA Division I Women's Soccer Championship *-Ineligible for postseason play due to D1 transition As of November 16, 2014 Rankings from NSCAA

2014 Big 12 Conference women's soccer standings
| | Conf. | | | | | | Overall |
| Team | W | | L | | T | PCT | W | | L | | T | PCT |
|---|---|---|---|---|---|---|---|---|---|---|---|---|
| No. 15 West Virginia ‍†‍‡‍^{y} | 7 | – | 0 | – | 1 | .938 | 16 | – | 2 | – | 4 | .818 |
| Oklahoma State ‍‍‍^{y} | 5 | – | 2 | – | 1 | .688 | 10 | – | 10 | – | 1 | .500 |
| No. 23 Kansas ‍‍‍^{y} | 5 | – | 3 | – | 0 | .625 | 15 | – | 6 | – | 0 | .714 |
| No. 14 Texas Tech ‍‍‍^{y} | 4 | – | 3 | – | 1 | .563 | 16 | – | 4 | – | 2 | .773 |
| Texas ‍‍‍^{y} | 4 | – | 4 | – | 0 | .500 | 11 | – | 8 | – | 4 | .565 |
| Oklahoma ‍‍‍^{y} | 3 | – | 4 | – | 1 | .438 | 10 | – | 9 | – | 4 | .522 |
| Baylor ‍‍‍ | 2 | – | 5 | – | 1 | .313 | 9 | – | 8 | – | 3 | .525 |
| TCU ‍‍‍ | 1 | – | 4 | – | 3 | .313 | 8 | – | 8 | – | 3 | .500 |
| Iowa State ‍‍‍ | 1 | – | 7 | – | 0 | .125 | 7 | – | 11 | – | 0 | .389 |
† – Conference champion ‡ – Tournament champion y – Invited to the NCAA tournament Rankings from NSCAA Coaches

2014 Atlantic 10 Conference women's soccer standings
| | Conf. | | | | | | Overall |
| Team | W | | L | | T | PCT | W | | L | | T | PCT |
|---|---|---|---|---|---|---|---|---|---|---|---|---|
| La Salle ‍†‍‍^{y} | 8 | – | 0 | – | 0 | 1.000 | 14 | – | 5 | – | 2 | .714 |
| VCU ‍‍‍ | 5 | – | 1 | – | 2 | .750 | 10 | – | 5 | – | 5 | .625 |
| Dayton ‍‍‡‍^{y} | 5 | – | 2 | – | 1 | .688 | 12 | – | 8 | – | 2 | .591 |
| Rhode Island ‍‍‍ | 4 | – | 3 | – | 1 | .563 | 12 | – | 5 | – | 2 | .684 |
| George Washington ‍‍‍ | 4 | – | 3 | – | 1 | .563 | 12 | – | 6 | – | 1 | .658 |
| Richmond ‍‍‍ | 3 | – | 3 | – | 2 | .500 | 9 | – | 9 | – | 2 | .500 |
| UMass ‍‍‍ | 3 | – | 3 | – | 2 | .500 | 5 | – | 9 | – | 5 | .395 |
| Saint Louis ‍‍‍ | 3 | – | 5 | – | 0 | .375 | 8 | – | 10 | – | 0 | .444 |
| George Mason ‍‍‍ | 2 | – | 4 | – | 2 | .375 | 4 | – | 11 | – | 2 | .294 |
| Fordham ‍‍‍ | 2 | – | 5 | – | 1 | .313 | 8 | – | 9 | – | 1 | .472 |
| Duquesne ‍‍‍ | 2 | – | 5 | – | 1 | .313 | 5 | – | 10 | – | 3 | .361 |
† – Conference champion ‡ – 2014 A10 Tourney champion: y- Invited to the NCAA Division I Women's Soccer Championship As of November 16, 2014 Rankings from NSCAA

2014 West Coast Conference women's soccer standings
| | Conf. | | | | | | Overall |
| Team | W | | L | | T | PCT | W | | L | | T | PCT |
|---|---|---|---|---|---|---|---|---|---|---|---|---|
| No. 22 BYU ‍†‍‍^{y} | 7 | – | 1 | – | 1 | .833 | 13 | – | 5 | – | 3 | .690 |
| Santa Clara ‍‍‍ | 7 | – | 2 | – | 0 | .778 | 14 | – | 6 | – | 0 | .700 |
| No. 10 Pepperdine ‍‍‍^{y} | 6 | – | 1 | – | 2 | .778 | 16 | – | 3 | – | 4 | .783 |
| San Diego ‍‍‍^{y} | 6 | – | 3 | – | 0 | .667 | 10 | – | 8 | – | 2 | .550 |
| Gonzaga ‍‍‍ | 4 | – | 4 | – | 1 | .500 | 9 | – | 9 | – | 1 | .500 |
| Portland ‍‍‍ | 4 | – | 4 | – | 1 | .500 | 7 | – | 9 | – | 3 | .447 |
| San Francisco ‍‍‍ | 3 | – | 5 | – | 1 | .389 | 7 | – | 10 | – | 3 | .425 |
| Loyola Marymount ‍‍‍ | 2 | – | 6 | – | 1 | .278 | 9 | – | 8 | – | 2 | .526 |
| Saint Mary's ‍‍‍ | 1 | – | 5 | – | 3 | .278 | 7 | – | 10 | – | 3 | .425 |
| Pacific ‍‍‍ | 0 | – | 9 | – | 0 | .000 | 2 | – | 16 | – | 1 | .132 |
† – Conference champion: y- Invited to the NCAA Division I Women's Soccer Championship As of December 9, 2014 Rankings from NSCAA

== See also ==
- College soccer
- List of NCAA Division I women's soccer programs
- 2014 in American soccer
- 2014 NCAA Division I Women's Soccer Tournament
- 2014 NCAA Division I men's soccer season
