= Aleisha Cramer =

American soccer player (born 1982)

Personal information
- Full name: Aleisha Marie Rose
- Birth name: Aleisha Marie Cramer
- Date of birth: July 29, 1982 (age 44)
- Place of birth: Wheat Ridge, Colorado, U.S.
- Height: 5 ft 10 in (1.78 m)
- Position: Midfielder

College career
Years	Team	Apps	(Gls)
2000–2003	BYU Cougars		

International career
1998–2002	United States	19	(0)

Aleisha Marie Rose (née Cramer; born July 29, 1982) is an American former soccer midfielder and Collegiate Assistant Coach who played for Brigham Young University and the US Women's National Soccer Team.

== High school ==
Cramer grew up in Lakewood, Colorado where she played for the Colorado Rush and Green Mountain High School soccer teams. She was an all-star stand-out who made regular appearances on the U16, U17 and U21 US Women's National Team. In 1998, at age 16 Cramer was called up to the US Women's National Team, the third youngest player to have ever played for the team. By the end of her senior year Cramer had become one of the top recruits in the country and was named 1999 National Gatorade HS Player of the Year.

== College ==
Following her high school career, Cramer committed and played for Brigham Young University under Head Coach Jennifer Rockwood. In her four seasons as a Cougar, Cramer earned All-American honors each season and lead the Cougars to four straight NCAA Tournament appearances. Cramer notched 28 goals, 47 assists in 92 games, her 47 assists are still the school record. In her senior season the Cougars advanced to the Elite Eight where on November 23, 2003, BYU lost to #18 Connecticut 4–1

== US national team ==
Cramer was the third youngest player to be called up to play for the national team. Only Mia Hamm and Kristine Lilly were younger. She made 11 appearances for the national team totaling 2 assists and 9 starts.

Cramer would go back and forth between first her club team and the national teams, then between BYU and the national team. While Cramer played for BYU, April Heinrich, Cramer's national team coach, defined Cramer as, "The [most] impactful player in women's college soccer today...She changed the game. At 19-years-of-age, that's about as good a compliment as you'll get from me without calling her the next Michael Jordan."

Cramer left the national team in the run up to the 2003 World Cup and 2004 Olympics. She continued to play at the collegiate level but never returned to the national ranks.

== Personal life ==
Aleisha Cramer was raised a member of the Church of Jesus Christ of Latter-day Saints, in Lakewood, Colorado. In 2003 Cramer left the national team citing her desire to honor her faith and not play games on Sunday. This decision was a topic of discussion throughout not just among fellow members of The Church of Jesus Christ of Latter-day Saints but nationwide. Cramer stayed true to her decision and never went back to the game after finishing her BYU career. In 2004, Cramer became an assistant coach for BYU, a post she held until 2018. She currently lives in Utah and is married with three kids.
