= 2017 BYU Cougars women's soccer team =

American college soccer season

2017 BYU Cougars women's soccer
- Conference: West Coast Conference
- Record: 7–8–4 (4–4–1 WCC)
- Head coach: Jennifer Rockwood (23rd season)
- Home stadium: South Stadium

Uniform
Home	Away

2017 West Coast Conference women's soccer standings
	Conf.						Overall
Team	W		L		T	PCT	W		L		T	PCT
No. 16 Pepperdine ‍†‍‍^{y}	8	–	0	–	1	.944	15	–	3	–	3	.786
No. 20 Santa Clara ‍‍‍^{y}	8	–	1	–	0	.889	15	–	7	–	1	.674
San Diego ‍‍‍	6	–	3	–	0	.667	8	–	11	–	0	.421
BYU ‍‍‍	4	–	4	–	1	.500	7	–	8	–	4	.474
Loyola Marymount ‍‍‍	4	–	4	–	1	.500	9	–	6	–	4	.579
San Francisco ‍‍‍	4	–	5	–	0	.444	8	–	10	–	2	.450
Saint Mary's ‍‍‍	3	–	5	–	1	.389	7	–	11	–	1	.395
Gonzaga ‍‍‍	2	–	7	–	0	.222	10	–	8	–	1	.553
Pacific ‍‍‍	2	–	7	–	0	.222	5	–	13	–	2	.300
Portland ‍‍‍	2	–	7	–	0	.222	5	–	13	–	1	.289
† – Conference champion y – Invited to the NCAA Tournament; As of November 19, 2017; Rankings from United Soccer Coaches Poll; Source:West Coast Conference

The 2017 BYU Cougars women's soccer team represented BYU during the 2017 NCAA Division I women's soccer season. The Cougars were coached for a 23rd consecutive season by Jennifer Rockwood, who was co-coach in 1995 and became the solo head coach in 1996. Before 1995 BYU women's soccer competed as a club team and not as a member of the NCAA. The Cougars entered the 2017 season having won five consecutive West Coast Conference championships and having made the NCAA Tournament each of the last five seasons and in 18 of the 22 seasons that Rockwood has been the head coach. Joining Rockwood as assistant coaches are Brent Anderson (1st season) and Aleisha Rose (14th season) with volunteer assistants Rachel Jorgensen (4th season) and McKinzie Young (6th season). The Cougars came off of a season were they advanced to the third round of the College Cup before being defeated by South Carolina to finish the season 18–3–1. The Cougars were picked to finish second by the WCC media. After a slow start the Cougars finished the season with their first losing record since 2004 at 7–8–4 and failed to make the NCAA Playoffs for the first time since 2011. They finished the conference tied for fourth at 4–4–1.

== Media ==
=== Television & Internet Streaming ===
All but one BYU women's soccer had a TV broadcast or internet video stream available. BYUtv and TheW.tv served as the primary providers. Information on these television broadcasts can be found under each individual match.

=== Nu Skin BYU Sports Network ===
For a fourth consecutive season the BYU Sports Network aired BYU Cougars women's soccer games. Greg Wrubell provided play-by-play for most games with Jason Shepherd filling-in when Wrubell had football duties. Former player Paige Hunt Barker served as the new analyst. ESPN 960 and BYU Radio acted as the flagship stations for women's soccer.

== Schedule ==
*- Denotes WCC game
x- Denotes Nu Skin BYU Sports Network/ESPN 960 broadcast
y- Television Broadcast
z- Internet Stream

=== x-Exhibition: Blue/White Game ===
Broadcasters: Greg Wrubell & Paige Barker (BYU Radio/ESPN 960)

- Two 40 minute halves made up the exhibition. Coaches were also free to move players from the Blue to the White and vice versa as it was an inter-squad match.

August 5, 2017	BYU Blue	1–3	BYU White	Provo, UT
7:00 p.m. MDT	Nadia Gomes 76'	Recap	Makaylie Moore 10'; Brittain Steiner 49'; Cameron Tucker 60'	Stadium: South Field; Attendance: N/A; Referee: Blake Griffiths; Assistant referees: Lisa Homel; Robert Duncombe

=== x-Exhibition: Oklahoma ===
Series History: BYU leads series 2–1–0
Broadcasters: Greg Wrubell & Paige Barker (BYU Radio/ESPN 960)
Chris Plank (Sooner Radio Network)

August 11, 2017	#16 Oklahoma Sooners	0–1	#8 BYU Cougars	Norman, OK
7:00 p.m. CDT		Recap	Brittain Steiner 77'	Stadium: John Crain Field; Attendance: 338; Referee: Dimitar Chavdarov; Assistant referees: Art Arustamyan; Jesse McNeil III; Fourth official: Michael Cap

=== xz-Penn State ===
Series History: BYU leads series 2–0–0
Broadcasters: No commentary (LionVision)
Greg Wrubell & Paige Barker (BYU Radio/ESPN 960)

August 18, 2017	Penn State Nittany Lions	3–1	#8 BYU Cougars	College Park, PA
7:00 p.m. EDT	Marissa Sheva 10', 65'; Alina Ortega-Jurado 62'	Recap	Cameron Tucker 58'	Stadium: Jeffrey Field; Attendance: 3,570; Referee: John McCloskey; Assistant referees: Terrence Mull; Bruce Shanaman; Fourth official: Tim Deljanovan

=== xy-Ohio State ===
Series History: BYU leads series 1–0–0
Broadcasters: Spencer Linton, Natalyn Lewis, & Lauren Francom McClain (BYUtv)
Greg Wrubell & Paige Barker (BYU Radio/ESPN 960)

August 21, 2017	#8 BYU Cougars	0–0	Ohio State Buckeyes	Provo, UT
5:30 p.m. MDT		Recap	Devon Kerr (yellow card) 98'	Stadium: South Stadium; Attendance: 2,678; Referee: Chris Elliott; Assistant referees: TJ Zablocki; Jay Hutchinson; Fourth official: Michael Anglin

=== x-Cal State Fullerton ===
Series History: BYU leads series 6–0–1
Broadcasters: Greg Wrubell & Paige Barker (BYU Radio/ESPN 960)

August 25, 2017	#17 BYU Cougars	1–1	Cal State Fullerton Titans	Provo, UT
7:00 p.m. MDT	Avery Walker 26'; Taylor Isom (yellow card) 82'; Rachel Bingham (yellow card) 100'	Recap	Samantha Koemans 30'	Stadium: South Stadium; Attendance: 2,515; Referee: Hamed Sadeghi; Assistant referees: Karsten Gillwald; Marcelo Chaparro; Fourth official: Robert Duncombe

=== xy-UCLA ===
Series History: BYU leads series 2–1–1
Broadcasters: Spencer Linton, Natalyn Lewis, & Lauren Francom McClain (BYUtv)
Jason Shepherd & Paige Barker (BYU Radio/ESPN 960)

September 1, 2017	BYU Cougars	0–1	#1 UCLA Bruins	Provo, UT
7:00 p.m. MDT		Recap	Hailie Mace 16'	Stadium: South Stadium; Attendance: 5,735; Referee: Michael Zapata; Assistant referees: Brad Jensen; Lisa Homel; Fourth official: Kristi Mak

=== xy-Colorado ===
Series History: BYU leads series 4–2–1
Broadcasters: Christian Miles & Krista Blunk (P12)
Greg Wrubell & Paige Barker (BYU Radio/ESPN 960)

September 4, 2017	#21 Colorado Buffaloes	3–0	BYU Cougars	Boulder, CO
4:30 p.m. MDT	Taylor Kornieck 23'; Tatum Barton 56', 83'	Recap		Stadium: Prentup Field; Attendance: 773; Referee: Corey Rockwell; Assistant referees: Adam Zarrin; Megan McCain; Fourth official: Karen Abt

=== xy-Utah ===
Game Name: Deseret First Duel
Series History: BYU leads series 21–7–1
Broadcasters: Spencer Linton, Natalyn Lewis, & Lauren Francom McCalin (BYUtv)
Greg Wrubell & Paige Barker (BYU Radio/ESPN 960)

September 8, 2017	BYU Cougars	1–1	#21 Utah Utes	Provo, UT
7:00 p.m. MDT	Cameron Tucker (yellow card) 56'; Nadia Gomes 57'	Recap	Eden Jacobsen 31'; Haylee Cacciacarne (yellow card) 57'	Stadium: South Stadium; Attendance: 5,367; Referee: Farhad Dadkho; Assistant referees: Schuyler Pack; Kali Smith; Fourth official: Robert Duncombe

=== xy-Oregon State ===
Series History: BYU leads series 2–0–0
Broadcasters: Ann Schatz & Tracey Bailey (P12)
Greg Wrubell & Paige Barker (BYU Radio/ESPN 960)

September 11, 2017	Oregon State Beavers	0–3	BYU Cougars	Corvallis, OR
7:00 p.m. PDT		Recap	Elise Flake 3'; Avery Walker 24'; Madie Lyons Mathews 38'; Rachel Bingham (yellow card) 74'	Stadium: Paul Lorenz Field; Attendance: 327; Referee: Katja Koroleva; Assistant referees: Jason Perlewitz; Ryan Jung; Fourth official: Stephanie Tercero

=== xy-Arizona ===
Series History: BYU leads series 11–1–0
Broadcasters: Daron Sutton (P12)
Jason Shepherd & Paige Barker (BYU Radio/ESPN 960)

September 15, 2017	Arizona Wildcats	2–1	BYU Cougars	Tucson, AZ
7:00 p.m. MST	Charlotte Brasica 32'; Amanda Porter 92'	Recap	Madie Mathews 73'	Stadium: Mulcahy Field; Attendance: 768; Referee: Randy Hoffman; Assistant referees: Matt Jacob; Mario Cross; Fourth official: Brian Weiss

=== xy-Kansas ===
Series History: BYU leads series 2–1–0
Broadcasters: Spencer Linton, Natalyn Lewis, & Lauren Francom McClain (BYUtv)
Greg Wrubell & Paige Barker (BYU Radio/ESPN 960)

September 18, 2017	BYU Cougars	3–2	Kansas Jayhawks	Provo, UT
1:00 p.m. MST	Nadia Gomes 29', 41' (pen.); Cameron Tucker 65'	Recap	Eva Eliasdottir 3'; Elise Reina (yellow card) 36'; Katie McClure (yellow card) 50'; Ceri Holland (yellow card) 62'; HC Mark Francis (red card) 74'; Grace Hagan 85'	Stadium: South Stadium; Attendance: 1,070; Referee: Allen Chapman; Assistant referees: Allen Pickett; Brandon Major; Fourth official: Blake Griffiths

=== xy-Utah Valley ===
Game Name: UCCU Crosstown Clash
Series History: BYU leads series 2–0–0
Broadcasters: Spencer Linton, Natalyn Lewis, & Lauren Francom McClain (BYUtv)
Greg Wrubell & Paige Barker (BYU Radio/ESPN 960)

September 22, 2017	BYU Cougars	3–0	Utah Valley Wolverines	Provo, UT
7:00 p.m. MDT	Nadia Gomes 15'; Elise Flake 55'; Bizzy Bowen 59'	Recap	Sydney Fitzpatrick (yellow card) 54'; Hannah Bruce (yellow card) 86'	Stadium: South Stadium; Attendance: 3,234; Referee: Brad Jensen; Assistant referees: Karsten Gillwald; Schuyler Pack; Fourth official: Marcelo Chapaaro

=== xy-San Diego* ===
Series History: BYU leads series 7–2–0
Broadcasters: Spencer Linton & Natalyn Lewis (BYUtv)
Jason Shepherd & Paige Barker (ESPN 960)

September 29, 2017	BYU Cougars	1–2	San Diego Toreros	Provo, UT
7:00 p.m. MDT	Elise Flake 79' (pen.); Mikayla Colohan (yellow card) 85'	Recap	Kelsi Dantu 5'; Courtney Coate 23'; Courtney Coate (yellow card) 60'	Stadium: South Stadium; Attendance: 3,109; Referee: Ceciah Valero; Assistant referees: Sly Yeates; Kali Smith; Fourth official: Lisa Homel

=== xy-Saint Mary's* ===
Series History: BYU leads series 6–0–1
Broadcasters: Spencer Linton, Natalyn Lewis, & Lauren Francom McClain (BYUtv)
Greg Wrubell & Paige Barker (BYU Radio/ESPN 960)

October 7, 2017	BYU Cougars	4–1	Saint Mary's Gaels	Provo, UT
7:00 p.m. MDT	Bizzy Bowen 14'; Madie Mathews 26', 51'; Avery Walker 27'	Recap	Jaylen Crim 51'	Stadium: South Stadium; Attendance: 2,576; Referee: Nathan Max; Assistant referees: Brandon Major; Michael Anglin; Fourth official: Alan Jimenez

=== xz-Pacific* ===
Series History: BYU leads series 4–1–0
Broadcasters: Robbie Bullough (TheW.tv)
Greg Wrubell & Paige Barker (BYU Radio/ESPN 960)

October 12, 2017	BYU Cougars	2–0	Pacific Tigers	Provo, UT
7:00 p.m. PDT	Madie Mathews 2'; Bizzy Bowen 42'	Report		Stadium: South Stadium; Attendance: 2,132; Referee: Megan McCain; Assistant referees: Jay Hutchinson; Lisa Homel; Fourth official: Schuyler Pack

=== xy- Pepperdine* ===
Series History: Series even 4–4–0
Broadcasters: Spencer Linton, Natalyn Lewis, & Lauren Francom McClain (BYUtv)
Greg Wrubell & Paige Barker (BYU Radio/ESPN 960)

October 19, 2017	BYU Cougars	1–2	#13 Pepperdine Waves	Provo, UT
7:00 p.m. MDT	Madie Mathews 14'	Recap	Joelle Anderson 19', 23'	Stadium: South Stadium; Attendance: 2,560; Referee: Elijio Arreguin; Assistant referees: TJ Zablocki; Daniel Spicer-Escala; Fourth official: Jerry Freestone

=== xz- Loyola Marymount* ===
Series History: BYU leads series 7–1–0
Broadcasters: Mitchell Marshall (TheW.tv)
Jason Shepherd & Paige Barker (ESPN 960)

October 21, 2017	BYU Cougars	0–0	Loyola Marymount Lions	Provo, UT
7:00 p.m. MDT	Taylor Isom (yellow card) 76'; Mikayla Colohan (yellow card) 81'; Bizzy Bowen (yellow card) 109'	Recap	Sarah Sanger (yellow card) 108'	Stadium: South Stadium; Attendance: 2,091; Referee: Chipalo Street; Assistant referees: Karsten Gillwald; Kristi Mak; Fourth official: Sly Yeates

=== xy- Gonzaga* ===
Series History: BYU leads series 9–0–0
Broadcasters: Trey Bender & Lori Lindsey (ESPNU)
Greg Wrubell & Paige Barker (BYU Radio/ESPN 960)

October 26, 2017	Gonzaga Bulldogs	3–6	BYU Cougars	Spokane, WA
7:00 p.m. PDT	Jodi Ülkekul 4'; Hope Tsuneyoshi 61'; Jordan Thompson 70' (pen.)	Recap	Cameron Tucker 34'; Elise Flake (yellow card) 45'; Mikayla Colohan 60', 74'; Elise Flake 61'; Madie Mathews 67'; Nadia Gomes 81'	Stadium: Gonzaga Soccer Field; Attendance: 1,019; Referee: Luis Guardia; Assistant referees: Charles Woolley; Matthew Hamlin; Fourth official: David Hamlin

=== xz- Portland* ===
Series History: BYU leads series 7–4–0
Broadcasters: Adam Linnman & Noelle La Prevotte (TheW.tv)
Jason Shepherd & Paige Barker (BYU Radio/ESPN 960)

October 28, 2017	Portland Pilots	0–1	BYU Cougars	Portland, OR
7:00 p.m. PDT		Recap	Elise Flake 68'	Stadium: Merlo Field; Attendance: 1,592; Referee: Turan Ozdemir; Assistant referees: Ryan Jung; Cephas Quartson; Fourth official: Corbyn May

=== xz-San Francisco* ===
- Originally scheduled for October 14, this match was postponed due to poor air quality stemming from wildfires in Northern California.

Series History: BYU leads series 6–1–0
Broadcasters: Charles Wollin (TheW.tv)
Greg Wrubell & Paige Barker (BYU Radio/ESPN 960)

November 2, 2017	San Francisco Dons	2–1	BYU Cougars	San Francisco, CA
7:00 p.m. PDT	Izzy Lueken 4'; Desiree Major 69'	Recap	Cameron Tucker 25'; Alyssa Jefferson (yellow card) 84'	Stadium: Negoesco Stadium; Attendance: 132; Referee: Josh Wilkens; Assistant referees: Victor Mba; Jeff Smith; Fourth official: Justin Yarkin

=== xz- Santa Clara* ===
Series History: Santa Clara leads series 6–1–4
Broadcasters: David Gentile (TheW.tv)
Greg Wrubell & Paige Barker (BYU Radio/ESPN 960)

November 4, 2017	Santa Clara Broncos	4–3	BYU Cougars	Santa Clara, CA
1:00 p.m. PDT	Kelli Peay 9'; Maria Sánchez 36' (pen.); Gundrun Arnardottir 42'; Maddy Gonzales 56'; Kelcie Hedge (yellow card) 56'	Recap	Madie Mathews 2', 24'; Mikayla Colohan 52'; Mikayla Colohan (yellow card) 63'	Stadium: Stevens Stadium; Attendance: 806; Referee: Christopher Calderon; Assistant referees: Deleana Quan; Stephen McGonagle; Fourth official: Eder Del Angel

== Roster ==
No.	Position	Player	Height	Hometown	Year
1	GK	Savanna Empey	5'10"	Lehi, UT	Freshman
2	D	Taylor Isom	5'7"	Sandy, UT	Senior
3	F	Carla Haslam	5'3"	South Jordan, UT	Senior
4	MF	Brittain Steiner	5'9"	Mercer, NJ	Senior
5	F	Elise Flake	5'7"	Mapleton, UT	Sophomore
6	F	Nadia Gomes	5'6"	Sandy, UT	Senior
7	D	Danika Bowman	5'7"	Redlands, CA	Sophomore
8	MF	Mikayla Colohan	5'8"	Fruit Heights, UT	Freshman
9	D	Shaylyn Orr	5'8"	Draper, UT	Freshman
10	MF	Elisabeth "Bizzy" Bowen	5'4"	Sandy, UT	Senior
11	GK	Hannah Clark	5'10"	Danville, CA	RS Senior
12	D	Avery Walker	5'7"	Ogden, UT	RS Senior
14	F	Josie Guinn	5'5"	Murrieta, CA	Freshman
15	F	Emma Bailey	5'1"	Eagle, ID	Freshman
16	MF	Kayci Griffin	5'9"	Austin, TX	Senior
18	GK	Sabrina Macias	5'5"	Littleton, CO	RS Sophomore
19	MF	Lizzy Braby	5'2"	Murray, UT	Sophomore
20	F, MF	Cameron Tucker	5'9"	Highland, UT	Freshman
21	MF	Madie Siddoway	5'9"	North Logan, UT	Junior
22	MF	Ellie Smith	5'9"	Alpine, UT	Freshman
23	MF	Rachel Bingham	5'7"	Spanish Fork, UT	RS Sophomore
24	MF	Stephanie Ney	5'9"	Cottonwood Heights, UT	Senior
25	D	Brynlee Welch	5'4"	Hyrum, UT	Sophomore
26	F	Madie Lyons Mathew	5'8"	Sandy, UT	Senior
28	D	Alyssa Jefferson	5'5"	Sandy, UT	Sophomore
29	GK	Josie Manwill	5'9"	Layton, UT	Freshman
32	GK	Cassidy Smith	5'9"	Alpine, UT	Sophomore

== Rankings ==
+ Regular season polls	Poll	Pre- Season	Week 1	Week 2	Week 3	Week 4	Week 5	Week 6	Week 7	Week 8	Week 9	Week 10	Week 11	Week 12 Postseason	Final
United Soccer Coaches	8	17	RV	RV	RV	NR	NR	NR	NR	NR	NR	NR	NR	NR	
Soccer America	12	14	NR	NR	NR	NR	NR	NR	NR	NR	NR	NR	NR	NR	
Top Drawer Soccer	20	22	RV	RV	RV	NR	NR	NR	NR	NR	NR	NR	NR	NR	

Legend
	Increase in ranking
	Decrease in ranking
	Not ranked previous week
(RV)	Received Votes
