= Jennifer Rockwood =

American soccer coach (born 1966)

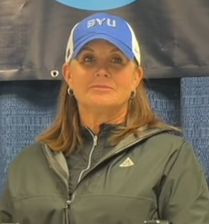
- Rockwood with BYU in 2025

Personal information
- Date of birth: September 20, 1966 (age 60)

Team information
- Current team: BYU Cougars (head coach)

Youth career
- –1984: Lakeridge Pacers

Senior career*
Years	Team	Apps	(Gls)
1985–1988	BYU club team		

Managerial career
- Waterford Ravens
- Meridian Mongooses
- Meridian Mongooses (boys)
- 1989–1994: BYU club team
- 1995–: BYU Cougars
- * Club domestic league appearances and goals

Jennifer Rockwood (born September 20, 1966) is an American college soccer coach who is the head coach for the BYU Cougars women's soccer team, a position she has held since 1989. She is the only coach the school recognizes since the club joined NCAA competition in 1995. In 2021, she was named the United Soccer Coaches College Coach of the Year after leading BYU to their first national title game appearance.

== Early life ==
Rockwood was born to Jerry and Kae Rockwood as the oldest of five children, with her brothers being named Jon, Jason, Jared, and Jeffrey. Throughout junior high and high school Rockwood acted as a four-sport athlete, in soccer, basketball, softball, and track. Rockwood was offered a basketball scholarship at Ricks College, which she accepted in the fall of 1984, but her one true desire was soccer. After participating in basketball in the Fall-winter of 1984–85, Rockwood transferred and enrolled at Brigham Young University. Rockwood would play with the Cougars club team from 1985 to 1988, and as a senior Rockwood was placed in charge of scheduling and budgets for the club team.

== Coaching career ==
Rockwood coached high school soccer for the Waterford School girls' team and the Meridian School's boys' and girls' teams prior to graduating from BYU. After graduating, she became the club team's head coach in 1989 and led them to two Western National Collegiate Club soccer Association (NCCSA) Championships in 1993 and 1994. In 1995 BYU officially recognized women's soccer as an NCAA sport. Rockwood was retained and became the Cougars first NCAA women's soccer coach. Rockwood began to have immediate success. In her 27 years as head coach, Rockwood's Cougars have made the NCAA tournament 21 times. In the October 19, 2013 match vs. the San Francisco Dons, Rockwood would amass her 300th win. Twice Rockwood has led the Cougars to the NCAA's Elite 8: 2003 and 2012. In 2021 Rockwood led the Cougars to their first ever College Cup. Athletes playing for Rockwood have seen continual success over those 27 seasons. 46 of Rockwood's players have gone on to win All-American awards.

== Head coaching record ==
=== Varsity ===
Record table
Season	Team	Overall	Conference	Standing	Postseason
BYU Cougars (Western Athletic Conference) (1995–1998)
1995	BYU	11–8–1	4–1–1	3rd	
1996	BYU	22–1–0	6–1–0	2nd	
1997	BYU	19–4–0	6–1–0	2nd	NCAA Division I First Round
1998	BYU	20–5–0	6–1–0	2nd	NCAA Division I Third Round
BYU Cougars (Mountain West Conference) (1999–2010)
1999	BYU	21–4–0	5–1–0	1st	NCAA Division I Second Round
2000	BYU	19–4–1	6–0–0	1st	NCAA Division I Second Round
2001	BYU	14–7–1	5–1–0	1st	NCAA Division I Second Round
2002	BYU	16–6–0	6–0–0	1st	NCAA Division I First Round
2003	BYU	16–7–3	4–2–0	2nd	NCAA Division I Elite 8
2004	BYU	7–10–4	3–2–1	2nd	
2005	BYU	15–2–4	4–1–2	3rd	NCAA Division I First Round
2006	BYU	13–3–4	5–1–1	2nd	NCAA Division I First Round
2007	BYU	17–4–2	4–3–0	3rd	NCAA Division I First Round
2008	BYU	18–5–1	7–0–0	1st	NCAA Division I Second Round
2009	BYU	18–4–2	6–0–1	1st	NCAA Division I Second Round
2010	BYU	16–3–3	5–1–1	2nd	NCAA Division I First Round
BYU Cougars (West Coast Conference) (2011–2022)
2011	BYU	11–5–3	5–2–1	4th	
2012	BYU	20–2–2	7–0–1	1st	NCAA Division I Elite 8
2013	BYU	15–5–1	8–1–0	T–1st	NCAA Division I Second Round
2014	BYU	13–5–3	7–1–1	1st	NCAA Division I First Round
2015	BYU	16–3–2	7–1–1	1st	NCAA Division I Second Round
2016	BYU	18–3–1	7–1–1	1st	NCAA Division I Third Round
2017	BYU	7–8–4	4–4–1	4th	
2018	BYU	13–5–1	8–1	1st	NCAA Division I First Round
2019	BYU	21–1–1	8–0–1	1st	NCAA Division I Elite 8
2020	BYU	11–4–1	7–1–1	2nd	NCAA Division I Second Round
2021	BYU	17–5–2	8–1–0	T–1st	NCAA Division I Runner-up
2022	BYU	11–3–7	6–0–3	2nd	NCAA Division I Sweet 16
BYU Cougars (Big 12 Conference) (2023–present)
2023	BYU	20–3–3	7–0–3	2nd	NCAA Division I Semifinal
2024	BYU	9–7–5	6–2–3	4th	NCAA Division I First Round
2025	BYU	11–7–6	4–5–2	8th	NCAA Division I Sweet 16
BYU:		475–143–68 (.742)	181–36–26 (.798)		
Total:		475–143–68 (.742)			
National champion Postseason invitational champion Conference regular season champion Conference regular season and conference tournament champion Division regular season champion Division regular season and conference tournament champion Conference tournament champion

== See also ==
- List of college women's soccer career coaching wins leaders
