= 2020–21 BYU Cougars women's soccer team =

American college soccer season

2020 BYU Cougars women's soccer
- Conference: West Coast Conference
- Record: 11–4–1 (7–1–1 WCC)
- Head coach: Jennifer Rockwood (26th season)
- Home stadium: South Stadium; Zions Bank Real Academy

Uniform
Home	Away

2021 West Coast Conference women's soccer spring standings
	Conf.						Overall
Team	W		L		T	PCT	W		L		T	PCT
No. 1 Santa Clara ‍†‍‍^{y}	7	–	0	–	0	1.000	11	–	1	–	0	.917
No. 23 BYU ‍‍‍^{y}	7	–	1	–	1	.833	11	–	4	–	1	.719
Gonzaga ‍‍‍	5	–	2	–	1	.688	7	–	3	–	1	.682
Pepperdine ‍‍‍	5	–	3	–	1	.611	6	–	5	–	1	.542
Saint Mary's ‍‍‍	4	–	3	–	2	.556	4	–	4	–	3	.500
San Francisco ‍‍‍	3	–	4	–	1	.438	4	–	4	–	2	.500
Portland ‍‍‍	2	–	4	–	3	.389	3	–	4	–	3	.450
Pacific ‍‍‍	1	–	6	–	2	.222	1	–	8	–	3	.208
San Diego ‍‍‍	1	–	5	–	1	.214	1	–	7	–	1	.167
Loyola Marymount ‍‍‍	1	–	8	–	0	.111	1	–	8	–	1	.150
† – Conference champion y – Invited to the NCAA Tournament; Rankings from Top Drawer Soccer; Source:West Coast Conference

The 2020–21 BYU Cougars women's soccer team represented BYU during the 2020–21 NCAA Division I women's soccer season. The Cougars were coached for a 26th consecutive season by Jennifer Rockwood, who was co-coach in 1995 and became the solo head coach in 1996. Before 1995 BYU women's soccer competed as a club team and not as a member of the NCAA. Overall, the Cougars have made the NCAA tournament in 20 of the 25 seasons that Rockwood has been the head coach. Joining Rockwood as assistant coaches are Brent Anderson (4th season) and Steve Magleby (3rd season) with volunteer assistants Rachel Jorgensen (6th season) and McKinzie Young (8th season). The Cougars came off of a season where they were first in the WCC and went 21–1–1, 8–0–1 in the WCC with the only loss coming to eventual College Cup Champion Stanford. The Cougars were picked to finish as champs by the WCC media. Due to the COVID-19 coronavirus, the women's soccer team practiced during the fall of 2020 and are playing a spring 2021 season with the NCAA Tournament also taking place in spring 2021.

== Media ==
=== Television and internet streaming ===
Most BYU women's soccer will have a TV broadcast or internet video stream available. BYUtv and WCC Network (the new name for TheW.tv) will once again serve as the primary providers. Information on these television broadcasts can be found under each individual match.

=== Nu Skin BYU Sports Network ===
For a seventh consecutive season the BYU Sports Network will air BYU Cougars women's soccer games. Greg Wrubell provided play-by-play for most games with Jason Shepherd filling-in when Wrubell had basketball duties. BYU Radio's KUMT station 107.9 FM acted as the flagship stations for women's soccer, though the BYU Sports App carried a few games exclusively.

Affiliates

- BYU Radio- KUMT 107.9 FM

== Schedule ==
=== Preseason ===
January 30, 2021	BYU	7–0	Weber State	Herriman, Utah
5:00 p.m. MST	Mikayla Colohan 2', 45'; Rachel McCarthy 37', 58'; Cameron Tucker 48', 76'; Makaylie Moore 62'	Recap		Stadium: Zions Bank Real Academy; Attendance: 150; Referee: Hamed Sadeghi; Assistant referees: Michael Anglin; Casey Harward

=== Regular season ===
February 6, 2021	BYU Cougars	5–1	Utah	Herriman, UT
5:00 p.m. MST	Cameron Tucker 5', 37', 74'; Rachel McCarthy 27'; Team (Own Goal) 32'	Recap	Anna Escobedo 18'	Stadium: Zions Bank Real Academy; Attendance: 255; Referee: Schuyler Pack; Assistant referees: Alan Jimenez; Bennett Savage

February 12, 2021	UCLA	2–1	BYU	Los Angeles, CA
5:00 p.m. PST	Marley Canales 59'; Sunshine Fontes 74'; Mia Fishel (yellow card) 86'	Recap	Jamie Shepherd 48'; Cameron Tucker (yellow card) 85'	Stadium: Wallis Annenberg Stadium; Attendance: 0 Referee: Randy Hoffman; Assistant referees: Salma Perez; Trevor Wiseman; Fourth official: Shayan Afzali

February 15, 2021	USC	4–3	BYU	Los Angeles, CA
3:00 p.m. PST	Tara McKeown 11', 70' (pen.); Jessica Haidet (yellow card) 40'; Penelope Hocking 59'; Jennifer Westendorf 97'	Recap	Rachel McCarthy 57'; Bella Folino 68', 77'	Stadium: Soni McAlister Field; Attendance: 0 Referee: Andrea Reyes; Assistant referees: Maria Magana; Kira Helmer; Fourth official: Kristin Patterson

February 20, 2021	San Diego	Postponed	BYU	San Diego, CA
PST				Stadium: Torero Stadium
Note: Postponed due to San Diego COVID-19 concerns.

February 27, 2021	BYU	3–2	San Francisco	Herriman, UT
5:00 p.m. MST	Makaylie Call 17'; Bella Folino 61'; Josie Gelalich (red card) 71'; Mikayla Colohan 73'		Ashley Humphrey 56'; Sydney Cooper 71' (pen.)	Stadium: Zions Bank Real Academy; Attendance: 75; Referee: Sly Yeates; Assistant referees: Schyler Pack; German Hortal

March 3, 2021	Missouri	0–3	BYU	Columbia, MO
	Eryka McIntyre (yellow card) 21'	Recap	Bella Folino 19'; Mikayla Colohan 51', 53'	Stadium: Audrey J. Walton Soccer Stadium; Attendance: 200; Referee: Elvis Mahmutovic; Assistant referees: Ryan Cook; Justin Tomicich; Fourth official: Doug Wolf

March 6, 2021	Loyola Marymount	1–3	BYU	Los Angeles, CA
1:00 p.m. PST	Abby Stewart 78'	Recap	Mikayla Colohan 26' (pen.); Brecken Mozingo 44'; Rachel McCarthy 59'	Stadium: Sullivan Field; Attendance: 0 Referee: Shayan Afzali; Assistant referees: Vincent Di Nardo; Shea McNair

March 13, 2021	BYU	1–2	Santa Clara	Provo, UT
1:00 p.m. MST	Mikayla Colohan 26' (pen.); Josie Gelalich (yellow card) 68'	Recap	Kelsey Turnbow 13'; Cianna Elmazaj (yellow card) 41'; Marisa Bunnis (yellow card) 52'; Alex Loera (yellow card) 85'; Julie Doyle 88'	Stadium: South Field; Attendance: 500; Referee: Hamed Sadeghi; Assistant referees: Allen Pickett; Bennett Savage

March 17, 2021	BYU	4–1	Utah Valley	Provo, UT
4:00 p.m. MDT	Mikayla Colohan 4', 30' (pen.); Rachel McCarthy 66'; Bella Folino 90'	Recap	Cassidy McCormick 19'; Sadie Brockbank (yellow card) 82'; Team (red card) 84'	Stadium: South Field; Attendance: 535; Referee: Brad Jensen; Assistant referees: Sergio Navas; Bennett Savage

March 20, 2021	Pacific	1–5	BYU	Stockton, CA
1:00 p.m. PDT	Ryanne Molenaar 7'		Bella Folino 27', 57'; Brecken Mozingo 47'; Rachel McCarthy 57'; Mikayla Colohan 79' (pen.)	Stadium: Knoles Field; Attendance: 0

March 24, 2021	San Diego	0–6	BYU	San Diego, CA
1 p.m. PDT		Recap	Cameron Tucker 8'; Mikayla Colohan 16'; Olivia Wade 36'; Rachel McCarthy 44', 64', 65'	Stadium: Torero Stadium; Attendance: 0 Referee: Samantha Martinez; Assistant referees: José Vega; Wale Animashaun

March 27, 2021	BYU	4–0	Gonzaga	Provo, UT
1:00 p.m. MDT	Makaylie Moore Call 10'; Jamie Shepherd 25'; Mikayla Colohan 49'; Cameron Tucker 67'			Stadium: South Field; Attendance: 547; Referee: T.J. Zablocki; Assistant referees: Allen Pickett; Marcello Chaparo

March 31, 2021	Santa Clara	1–2	BYU	Santa Clara, CA
7 p.m. PDT	Izzy D'Aquila 5'; Alex Loera (yellow card) 83'	Recap	Mikayla Colohan 11'; Jamie Shepherd (yellow card) 53'; Cameron Tucker 57'	Stadium: Stevens Stadium; Attendance: 0 Referee: Alex Marquand-Willse; Assistant referees: Alex Del Angel; Juan Cruz

April 3, 2021	Saint Mary's	1–1	BYU	Moraga, CA
1 p.m. PDT	Maya Alcantara 80'	Recap	Cameron Tucker 86'	Stadium: Saint Mary's Stadium; Attendance: 0 Referee: Christopher Spivey; Assistant referees: Ritesh Chotu; Alex Delgado

April 10, 2021	Pepperdine	1–2	BYU	Malibu, CA
1:00 p.m. PDT	Leyla McFarland 68'	Recap	Johnson Brockbank 26'; Cameron Tucker 60'	Stadium: Tari Frahm Rokus Field; Attendance: 6 Referee: Shayan Afzali; Assistant referees: Jonathan Kaminski; David Ramirez

April 12, 2021	Pepperdine	Cancelled	BYU	Malibu, CA
3:00 p.m. PDT				Stadium: Tari Frahm Rokus Field

April 17, 2021	BYU	4–0	Portland	Provo, UT
1:00 p.m. MDT	Bella Folino 15'; Rachel McCarthy 17'; Cassidy Smith (yellow card) 18'; Brecken Mozingo 33'; Ashton Brockbank Johnson 54'	Recap	Gabi Brummett (yellow card) 87'	Stadium: South Field; Attendance: 538; Referee: Sly Yeates; Assistant referees: Michael Anglin; Alan Pickett

=== Postseason ===
May 1, 2021	BYU	0–2	Virginia	Cary, NC
3:00 p.m. EDT		Recap	Alexa Spaanstra 34', 68'	Stadium: WakeMed Soccer Park; Attendance: 150

== Roster ==
No.	Position	Player	Height	Hometown	Year
1	GK	Haven Empey	5'9"	American Fork, UT	Freshman
2	MF, D	Olivia Smith	5'6"	Eagle, ID	RS Freshman
3	MF, F	Makaylie Call	5'5"	Auburn, WA	Senior
4	D	Grace Johnson	5'10"	Centerville, UT	Senior
5	F, MF	Brecken Mozingo	5'6"	Sandy, UT	Sophomore
6	MF	Ashton Johnson	5'10"	Provo, UT	Junior
7	D	Brooke Hale	5'10"	Danville, CA	Freshman
8	MF	Mikayla Colohan	5'8"	Fruit Heights, UT	Senior
10	MF, F	Olivia Wade	5'8"	Kaysville, UT	Sophomore
11	MF, F	Ellie Maughan	5'8"	North Ogden, UT	Sophomore
12	MF	Jamie Shepherd	5'7"	American Fork, UT	Sophomore
13	F, MF	Lytiana Akinaka	5'6"	Maui, HI	Junior
14	D	Josie Gelilach	5'5"	Murrieta, CA	Senior
15	D	Zoe Jacobs	5'5"	Kaysville, UT	Sophomore
16	MF, D	Kendell Petersen	5'8"	South Weber, UT	Sophomore
18	F, MF	Paola Garcia	5'3"	Mapleton, UT	Freshman
19	F, MF	Natalie Clark	5'8"	Mesa, AZ	Junior
20	F	Cameron Tucker	5'9"	Highland, UT	Senior
22	F, MF	Bella Folino	5'6"	Aliso Viejo, CA	RS Sophomore
26	D	Laveni Vaka	5'6"	Sandy, UT	Sophomore
27	F	Daviana Vaka	5'7"	Sandy, UT	RS Freshman
28	D	Natalee Wells	5'7"	Alpine, UT	Junior
29	MF, D	Abbie Kotter	5'9"	Providence, UT	Freshman
32	GK	Cassidy Smith	5'9"	Alpine, UT	RS Senior
33	MF, F	Rachel McCarthy	5'7"	American Fork, UT	Sophomore
66	GK	Savanna Empey	5'10"	American Fork, UT	Freshman

== Rankings ==
+ Regular season polls	Poll	Week 12	Week 13	Week 14	Week 15	Week 16	Week 17	Week 18	Week 19	Week 20	Week 21	Week 22	Week 23 Postseason	Final
United Soccer Coaches	–	–	–	–	14	13	17	16	17	16	17	17	17	
Top Drawer Soccer	10	10	10	21	21	20	25	24	22	21	21	21	23	

Legend
	Increase in ranking
	Decrease in ranking
	Not ranked previous week
(RV)	Received Votes
