= BYU Cougars women's soccer =

American college soccer team

- Founded: 1995; 31 years ago
- University: Brigham Young University
- Athletic director: Brian Santiago
- Head coach: Jennifer Rockwood (32nd season)
- Conference: Big 12
- Location: Provo, Utah, US
- Stadium: The Stadium at South Field (capacity: 4,200)
- Nickname: Cougars
- Colors: Blue and white
Home	Away

NCAA tournament runner-up
- 2021

NCAA tournament College Cup
- 2021, 2023

NCAA tournament Quarterfinals
- 2003, 2012, 2019, 2021, 2023

NCAA tournament Round of 16
- 1998, 2000, 2003, 2012, 2016, 2019, 2021, 2022, 2023, 2025

NCAA tournament Round of 32
- 1997, 1998, 1999, 2000, 2001, 2003, 2008, 2009, 2012, 2013, 2015, 2016, 2019, 2020, 2021, 2022, 2023, 2025

NCAA tournament appearances
- 1997, 1998, 1999, 2000, 2001, 2002, 2003, 2005, 2006, 2007, 2008, 2009, 2010, 2012, 2013, 2014, 2015, 2016, 2018, 2019, 2020, 2021, 2022, 2023, 2024, 2025, 2026

Conference tournament championships
- Western Athletic Conference; 1996; Mountain West Conference; 1999, 2000, 2001, 2002, 2007, 2008, 2010; Big 12 Conference; 2025, 2026

Conference regular season championships
- Mountain West Conference; 1999, 2000, 2001, 2002, 2008, 2009; West Coast Conference; 2012, 2013, 2014, 2015, 2016, 2018, 2019, 2021; Big 12 Conference; 2026

The BYU Cougars women's soccer is the team that represents Brigham Young University in the Big 12 Conference of NCAA Division I soccer. Prior to the 1995 season, the team participated as a club sport. The team is coached by Jennifer Rockwood and has made the NCAA Tournament 26 times, reaching the Quarterfinals of the College Cup five times in 2003, 2012, 2019, 2021, and 2023. The team plays its home games at South Field on the university campus.

== History ==
From its founding until 1995 the BYU Cougars women's soccer club participated in the Western National Collegiate Club Soccer Association (NCCSA). Twice during that stretch, they made the NSCAA Championship, in 1993 and 1994. Jennifer Rockwood coached the BYU Women's soccer club for seven seasons before they joined the NCAA in 1995. Since joining the NCAA, BYU has consistently been ranked in the top 25. In 23 of the 28 years, they have qualified for the NCAA Tournament. To date, the Cougars have produced 38 All-Americans, and 7 of their many players continued to play professionally.

== Results by season ==
Season Results
Year	Coach	Overall Record	Conference Record	Conference Standing	Postseason
(Western Athletic Conference) (1995–1998)
1995	Jennifer Rockwood	11–8–1	4–1–1	3rd	–
1996	Jennifer Rockwood	22–1–0	6–1–0	2nd	–
1997	Jennifer Rockwood	19–4–0	6–1–0	2nd	NCAA Round of 32
1998	Jennifer Rockwood	20–5–0	6–1–0	2nd	NCAA Round of 16
(Mountain West Conference) (1999–2010)
1999	Jennifer Rockwood	21–4–0	5–1–0	1st	NCAA Round of 32
2000	Jennifer Rockwood	19–4–1	6–0–0	1st	NCAA Round of 16
2001	Jennifer Rockwood	14–7–1	5–1–0	1st	NCAA Round of 32
2002	Jennifer Rockwood	16–6–0	6–0–0	1st	NCAA 1st Round
2003	Jennifer Rockwood	16–7–3	4–2–0	2nd	NCAA Elite 8
2004	Jennifer Rockwood	7–10–4	3–2–1	2nd	–
2005	Jennifer Rockwood	15–2–4	4–1–2	3rd	NCAA 1st Round
2006	Jennifer Rockwood	13–3–4	5–1–1	2nd	NCAA 1st Round
2007	Jennifer Rockwood	17–4–2	4–3–0	3rd	NCAA 1st Round
2008	Jennifer Rockwood	18–5–1	7–0–0	1st	NCAA Round of 32
2009	Jennifer Rockwood	18–4–2	6–0–1	1st	NCAA Round of 32
2010	Jennifer Rockwood	16–3–3	5–1–1	2nd	NCAA 1st Round
(West Coast Conference) (2011–2022)
2011	Jennifer Rockwood	11–5–3	5–2–1	4th	–
2012	Jennifer Rockwood	20–2–2	7–0–1	1st	NCAA Elite 8
2013	Jennifer Rockwood	15–5–1	8–1–0	1st	NCAA Round of 32
2014	Jennifer Rockwood	13–5–3	7–1–1	1st	NCAA 1st Round
2015	Jennifer Rockwood	16–3–2	7–1–1	1st	NCAA Round of 32
2016	Jennifer Rockwood	18–3–1	7–1–1	1st	NCAA Round of 16
2017	Jennifer Rockwood	7–8–4	4–4–1	T-4th	—
2018	Jennifer Rockwood	13–5–1	8–1–0	1st	NCAA 1st Round
2019	Jennifer Rockwood	21–1–1	8–0–1	1st	NCAA Elite 8
2020–21	Jennifer Rockwood	11–4–1	7–1–1	2nd	NCAA Round of 32
2021	Jennifer Rockwood	17–4–3	8–1–0	T-1st	NCAA Runner-up
2022	Jennifer Rockwood	11–3–7	6–0–3	2nd	NCAA Round of 16
(Big 12 Conference) (2023–present)
2023	Jennifer Rockwood	20–3–3	7–0–3	2nd	NCAA Final 4
2024	Jennifer Rockwood	9–7–5	6–2–3	4th	NCAA First Round
2025	Jennifer Rockwood	11–7–6	4–5–2	8th	NCAA Round of 16
Totals 31 Years; 1 Coach		471-142-67 (.742)		14 Conf. Championships	26 Postseason Appearances

== Current roster ==
As of November 2026

Note: Flags indicate national team as defined under FIFA eligibility rules; some limited exceptions apply. Players may hold more than one non-FIFA nationality.

No.	Pos.	Nation	Player
0	GK	USA	Eva Crane
00	GK	USA	Chelsea Peterson
1	GK	USA	Paiton Collins
2	MF	USA	Halle Dixon
3	DF	USA	Ella Rustand-Ford
4	DF	USA	Avery Frischknecht
5	MF	USA	Ella Labrum
6	MF	USA	Kate Fuller
7	DF	USA	Ellie Karl
8	MF	USA	Mika Krommenhoek
9	DF	USA	Emma Neff
10	FW	USA	Sophie Sivulich
11	MF	USA	Anna Neff
12	MF	USA	Afton Perry
14	FW	USA	Emma Hamberlin

No.	Pos.	Nation	Player
15	FW	USA	Ellie Walbruch
16	FW	USA	Sophie Williams
18	FW	USA	Kyleigh Hastings
19	FW	USA	Brynnli Tolbert
20	DF	USA	Presley Freeman
21	FW	USA	Mia Goettsche
22	MF	USA	Camryn Jorgensen
24	DF	USA	Bella Woods
25	FW	USA	Tianna Hunsaker
28	FW	USA	Sydney Snow
29	FW	USA	Diana Tuilevuka
30	FW	USA	Mattyn Summers-Oviatt
32	GK	USA	Sarah Mathis
33	MF	USA	Lucy Kesler

== Individual Records ==
Career Goals
Player	Years	Goals
Shauna Rohbock	1995–98	94
Mikayla Colohan	2017–21	53
Sara Reading	1997–00	52
Maren Hendershot McCrary	1996–99	51
Ashley Hatch	2013-16	47

Season Goals
Player	Year	Goals
Shauna Rohbock	1996	35
Shauna Rohbock	1998	24
Shauna Rohbock	1995	20
Elise Flake	2019	20
Maren Hendershot McCrary	1998	19
Ashley Hatch	2016	19

Career Assists
Player	Years	Assists
Aleisha Cramer Rose	2000–03	47
Mikayla Colohan	2017–21	39
Michelle Jensen Peterson	1995–97; 1999–00	38
Brecken Mozingo	2019–23	37
Maren Hendershot McCrary	1996–99	36
Kim Lowe Halladay	1997–00	36

Season Assists
Player	Year	Assists
Kim Lowe Halladay	2000	15
Mikayla Colohan	2021	15
Brecken Mozingo	2023	15
Aleisha Cramer Rose	2000	13
Aleisha Cramer Rose	2003	13
Michele Vasconcelos	2016	13
Lizzy Braby	2019	13

Career Points
Player	Years	Points
Shauna Rohbock	1995–98	216
Mikayla Colohan	2017–21	145
Maren Hendershot McCrary	1996–99	138
Sara Reading	1997-00	125
Ashley Hatch	2013–16	115
Cameron Tucker	2017–21	115

Season Points
Player	Year	Points
Shauna Rohbock	1996	79
Shauna Rohbock	1998	57
Mikayla Colohan	2021	51
Michelle Jensen Peterson	2000	48
Elise Flake	2019	47

Career Saves
Player	Years	Saves
McKinzie Olson	2008–11	280
Erika Woodbury	2004–07	261
Erica Owens	2009–13	142
Cassidy Smith	2016-21	134
Sabrina Davis	2015–19	118

Season Saves
Player	Year	Saves
Dana Wood	1995	89
Rachel Boaz	2015	78
Erica Owens	2012	77
McKinzie Olson	2010	74
Erika Woodbury	2004	73
Erika Woodbury	2007	73

== Notable alumni ==
Main page: Category:BYU Cougars women's soccer players

=== Current professional players ===
- Nádia Gomes (2014–2017) - Currently with Chicago Stars FC
- Ashley Hatch (2013–2016) - Currently with Washington Spirit
- Jamie Shepherd (2019–2023) - Currently with Bay FC
- Cameron Tucker (2017–2021) - Currently a free agent
- Brecken Mozingo (2020–2023) - Currently with Utah Royals
- Laveni Vaka (2019–2023) - Currently with Fort Lauderdale United FC
- Jennie Marshall Lakip (2008–2011) - Currently with Valadares Gaia F.C.
