= 2014 BYU Cougars women's soccer team =

American college soccer season

2014 BYU Cougars women's soccer

NCAA Division I Women's Soccer Championship, 1st Round Loss, Colorado
- Conference: West Coast Conference
- Record: 15–5–3 (7–1–1 WCC)
- Head coach: Jennifer Rockwood
- Home stadium: South Stadium

Uniform
Home	Away

2014 West Coast Conference women's soccer standings
	Conf.						Overall
Team	W		L		T	PCT	W		L		T	PCT
No. 22 BYU ‍†‍‍^{y}	7	–	1	–	1	.833	13	–	5	–	3	.690
Santa Clara ‍‍‍	7	–	2	–	0	.778	14	–	6	–	0	.700
No. 10 Pepperdine ‍‍‍^{y}	6	–	1	–	2	.778	16	–	3	–	4	.783
San Diego ‍‍‍^{y}	6	–	3	–	0	.667	10	–	8	–	2	.550
Gonzaga ‍‍‍	4	–	4	–	1	.500	9	–	9	–	1	.500
Portland ‍‍‍	4	–	4	–	1	.500	7	–	9	–	3	.447
San Francisco ‍‍‍	3	–	5	–	1	.389	7	–	10	–	3	.425
Loyola Marymount ‍‍‍	2	–	6	–	1	.278	9	–	8	–	2	.526
Saint Mary's ‍‍‍	1	–	5	–	3	.278	7	–	10	–	3	.425
Pacific ‍‍‍	0	–	9	–	0	.000	2	–	16	–	1	.132
† – Conference champion y- Invited to the NCAA Division I Women's Soccer Championship; As of December 9, 2014; Rankings from NSCAA

The 2014 BYU Cougars women's soccer team represented BYU during the 2014 NCAA Division I women's soccer season. The Cougars were coached for a 20th consecutive season by Jennifer Rockwood, who was co-coach in 1995 and became the solo head coach in 1996. Before 1995 BYU women's soccer competed as a club team and not as a member of the NCAA. The Cougars entered the 2014 season having won back-to-back West Coast Conference championships and having made the NCAA Tournament each of the last two seasons and in 15 of the 19 seasons that Rockwood has been the head coach. The Cougars would win the WCC title and secure a berth in the College Cup, where they lost to Colorado playing in the snow.

== Media ==
=== Television & Internet Streaming ===
- For 2014 all but 2 Cougars home games aired on BYUtv. All BYUtv games were simulcast on BYU Radio. Spencer Linton and Natalyn Lewis served as the BYUtv broadcast team. The remaining two home games were streamed online through TheW.tv.
- All road games had internet streaming capabilities. Two road games were televised. The game at Utah was shown on Pac-12 Networks while the game at Denver was shown on Altitude 2 (and streamed online through Pioneer Vision). The game at Cal State Fullerton aired on BigWest.tv, at Tennessee streamed on SEC Network+, at SMU streamed for a cost through PonyUp TV, and all conference road games were streamed through the school's website or on TheW.tv.

=== Nu Skin Cougar IMG Sports Network ===
For the first time ever the Cougar IMG Sports Network entered into a contract to broadcast BYU Cougars women's soccer games. Greg Wrubell provided play-by-play while former men's assistant coach Hugh Van Wagenen acted as analyst. For game where Van Wagenen wasn't available Colette Jepson Smith filled in as analyst. The games were streamed exclusively on BYUcougars.com and through the BYU Cougars athletic app.

== Schedule ==
*- Denotes WCC game
x- Denotes Cougar IMG Sports Network broadcast
y- Television Broadcast
z- Internet Stream

=== Blue/White Classic ===
August 13, 2014	Blue	0–1	White	Provo, UT
7:00 p.m. MDT		Recap	Nadia Gomes 25'	Stadium: South Stadium; Attendance: N/A

=== x-Alumni Game ===
August 16, 2014	Alumni	2–7	BYU	Provo, UT
7:00 p.m. MDT	Jeni Willardson Viernes 15', 68'	Recap	Elena Medeiros 11', 43'; Niki Fernandes 14'; Ashley Hatch 66', 79'; Marissa Nimmer 67'; Elisabeth Phillips 84'	Stadium: South Stadium; Attendance: N/A; Referee: Mitch Lillywhite; Assistant referees: Schuyler Pack; Kali Smith

=== xz-Cal State Fullerton ===
Series History: BYU leads series 6–0
Broadcaster: Mike Martinez (BigWest.tv)

August 22, 2014 1	BYU Cougars	1–1	Cal State Fullerton Titans	Fullerton, CA
9:00 p.m. MDT	Ashley Hatch 77'	Recap	Lauren Stupin (yellow card) 29'; Ivy Diego 83'	Stadium: Titan Stadium; Attendance: 1,365; Referee: Arnold Baldeaux; Assistant referees: Alex Estrada; Gary Nakano

=== xy-Washington State ===
Series History: BYU leads series 3–2–1
Broadcasters: Spencer Linton, Natalyn Lewis, & Lauren Francom (BYUtv)

August 25, 2014 2	Washington State Cougars	0–0	BYU Cougars	Provo, UT
5:30 p.m. MDT		Recap		Stadium: South Stadium; Attendance: 2,225; Referee: Allen Chapman; Assistant referees: Mitch Lillywhite; Brad Jensen; Fourth official: Jeff Young

=== z-Tennessee ===
Series History: Series Even 1–1
Broadcasters: Brian Rice & Tori Beeler Watson (SEC Network+)

August 29, 2014 3	BYU Cougars	1–0	Tennessee Lady Volunteers	Knoxville, TN
5:00 p.m. MDT	Elena Medeiros 17'	Recap		Stadium: Regal Soccer Stadium; Attendance: 1,691; Referee: Lance VanHaitsma; Assistant referees: Chad Collins; William Bethea; Fourth official: Mike Compton

=== xy-Baylor ===
Series History: BYU leads series 1–0
Broadcasters: Spencer Linton, Natalyn Lewis, & Lauren Francom (BYUtv)

September 1, 2014 4	Baylor Lady Bears	2–1	BYU Cougars	Provo, UT
1:00 p.m. MDT	Justine Hovden 45'; Precious Akanyirige 46'; Justine Hovden (yellow card) 51'; Katie Daigle (yellow card) 84'	Recap	Nadia Gomes (yellow card) 81'; Elisabeth Phillips (yellow card) 88'; Elisabeth Phillips 89' (pen.)	Stadium: South Stadium; Attendance: 4,517; Referee: Hamed Sadeghi; Assistant referees: Scott Reynolds; Jay Hutchinson; Fourth official: Kali Smith

=== xy-Utah ===
Series History: BYU leads series 19–6–1
Broadcasters: Jason Knapp & Temryss Lane (Pac-12 Network)

September 5, 2014 5	BYU Cougars	0–1	Utah Utes	Salt Lake City, UT
5:00 p.m. MDT		Recap	Katie Taylor (yellow card) 28'; Katie Taylor 84' (pen.); Avery Jenkins (yellow card) 86'	Stadium: Ute Field; Attendance: 2,552; Referee: Frank Anderson; Assistant referees: Hamed Sadeghi; Sly Yeates; Fourth official: Jay Hutchinson

=== z-LSU ===
Series History: Series even 1–1–1
Broadcasters: Robbie Bullough & Amber Wadsworth (TheW.tv)

September 11, 2014 6	LSU Tigers	4–3	BYU Cougars	Provo, UT
6:00 p.m. MDT	Summer Clarke 23'; Megan Lee 39'; Jorian Baucom 64' (pen.); Emma Fletcher 79'	Recap	Marissa Nimmer 24'; Ashley Hatch 63'; Nadia Gomes 86'	Stadium: South Stadium; Attendance: 757; Referee: Mitch Lillywhite; Assistant referees: Brandon Major; Brad Jensen; Fourth official: Blake Griffiths

=== xy-Long Beach State ===
Series History: BYU leads 4–2
Broadcasters: Spencer Linton & Natalyn Lewis (BYUtv)

September 13, 2014 7	Long Beach State 49ers	0–2	BYU Cougars	Provo, UT
7:00 p.m. MDT		Recap	Ashley Hatch 30', 74'	Stadium: South Stadium; Attendance: 1,880; Referee: Tyler Ploeger; Assistant referees: Paul Scott; Alan Jimenez; Fourth official: Karsten Gillwald

=== xy-Oregon ===
Series History: BYU leads series 3–0–1
Broadcasters: Spencer Linton & Natalyn Lewis (BYUtv)

September 18, 2014 8	Oregon Ducks	1–2	BYU Cougars	Provo, UT
7:00 p.m.	Allie Rodriguez 30'; Abby Steele (yellow card) 50'; Caitlyn Wong (yellow card) 59'	Recap	Marissa Nimmer 50' (pen.); Ashley Hatch (yellow card) 59'; Madie Lyons 76'	Stadium: South Stadium; Attendance: 3,871; Referee: Ignacio Jaimes; Assistant referees: Scott Reynolds; Jeff Young; Fourth official: Marcelo Chaparro

=== xz-Colorado College ===
Series History: Series even 1–1
Broadcasters: Robbie Bullough, Amber Wadsworth, & Colette Jepson Smith (TheW.tv)

September 20, 2014 9	Colorado College Tigers	0–4	BYU Cougars	Provo, UT
7:35 p.m. MDT	Samantha Curran (yellow card) 40'; AnneSophie LaPointe (yellow card) 56'	Recap	Niki Fernandes 5', 22'; Marissa Nimmer 41'; Michele Murphy 56' (pen.)	Stadium: South Stadium; Attendance: 2,243; Referee: Brad Jensen; Assistant referees: Michael Anglin; Jay Hutchinson; Fourth official: Kali Smith

=== xy-Denver ===
Series History: Series even 1–1
Broadcasters: Mike Evans & Kristen Hamilton (ALT 2)

September 25, 2014 10	BYU Cougars	4–1	Denver Pioneers	Denver, CO
7:00 p.m. MDT	Elena Medeiros 4'; Madie Lyons 40'; Michele Murphy 53'; Ashley Hatch 59'	Recap	Francesca Garzelloni 12'	Stadium: CIBER Field; Attendance: 1,006; Referee: Ben Chouaf; Assistant referees: Adam Mueller; Ken Kehir

=== xz-SMU ===
Series History: SMU leads series 1–0
Broadcaster: Lindsey Olsen (PonyUp TV)

September 27, 2014 11	BYU Cougars	3–0	SMU Mustangs	University Park, TX
6:00 p.m. MDT	Elena Medeiros 66'; Ashley Hatch 73' (pen.), 76'	Recap		Stadium: Westcott Field; Attendance: 623; Referee: Leszek Stalmach; Assistant referees: Ryan Pool; Dustin Cohen; Fourth official: Brett Wiles

=== *z-San Diego ===
Series History: BYU leads series 4–2
Broadcaster: Jack Cronin (TheW.tv)

October 3, 2014 12	BYU Cougars	3–2	San Diego Toreros	San Diego, CA
8:30 p.m. MDT	Niki Fernandes 16'; Elisabeth Phillips 59'; Ashley Hatch 78'	Recap	Jacquelin Altschild 13'; Julia Sherwood 52'	Stadium: Torero Stadium; Attendance: 982

=== *y-Portland ===
Series History: Series even 4–4
Broadcasters: Ty Brandenburg, Natalyn Lewis, & Lauren Francom (BYUtv)

October 9, 2014 13	Portland Pilots	0–3	BYU Cougars	Provo, UT
6:00 p.m. MDT		Recap	Ashley Hatch 5', 14', 83'	Stadium: South Stadium; Attendance: 1,683; Referee: Michael Zapata; Assistant referees: Hamed Sadeghi; Sly Yeates; Fourth official: Blake Griffiths

=== *y-Gonzaga ===
Series History: BYU leads series 6–0
Broadcasters: Spencer Linton & Natalyn Lewis (BYUtv)

October 11, 2014 14	Gonzaga Bulldogs	0–2	BYU Cougars	Provo, UT
7:00 p.m. MDT		Recap	Elena Medeiros 60'; Michele Murphy 63'	Stadium: South Stadium; Attendance: 3,483; Referee: Paul Nothman; Assistant referees: Mitch Lillywhite; Alan Jimenez; Fourth official: Jeff Young

=== *z-Loyola Marymount ===
Series History: BYU leads series 4–1
Broadcasters: No audio- Video only (LMU All Access)

October 18, 2014 15	BYU Cougars	3–0	Loyola Marymount Lions	Los Angeles, CA
8:00 p.m. MDT	Elisabeth Phillips 42'; Niki Fernandes 49'; Stephanie Ringwood (yellow card) 56'; Ashley Hatch 62'	Recap	Shannon Kent (yellow card) 68'	Stadium: Sullivan Field; Attendance: 461; Referee: Joseph Dickerson; Assistant referees: Magic Berenji; Israel Fernandez; Fourth official: Bernhard Hosu

=== *xy-Santa Clara ===
Series History: Santa Clara leads series 6–0–2
Broadcasters: Spencer Linton & Natalyn Lewis (BYUtv)

October 23, 2014 16	Santa Clara Broncos	2–5	BYU Cougars	Provo, UT
7:00 p.m. MDT	Mariana Galvan 14'; Brittany Ambrose 26'	Recap	Ashley Hatch 5', 29'; Michele Murphy 23', 47'; Nadia Gomes 88'	Stadium: South Stadium; Attendance: 2,279; Referee: Christopher Calderon; Assistant referees: Brad Jensen; Scott Reynolds; Fourth official: Karsten Gillwald

=== *xy-San Francisco ===
Series History: BYU leads series 5–0
Broadcasters: Dave McCann & Natalyn Lewis (BYUtv)

October 25, 2014 17	San Francisco Dons	0–3	BYU Cougars	Provo, UT
7:00 p.m. MDT	Jaciara Mello (yellow card) 41'	Recap	Elena Medeiros 61'; Michele Murphy 71'; Ashley Hatch 73'	Stadium: South Stadium; Attendance: 2,841; Referee: Jeff Arthurholtz; Assistant referees: Brandon Major; Blake Griffiths; Fourth official: Marcelo Chaparro

=== *xz-Saint Mary's ===
Series History: BYU leads series 4–0
Broadcasters: Daniel Conlin & Ashley Neid (TheW.tv)

October 30, 2014 18	BYU Cougars	1–1	Saint Mary's Gaels	Moraga, CA
4:00 p.m. MDT	Marissa Nimmer 12'	Recap	Vicki Shimkus 30'	Stadium: Saint Mary's Stadium; Attendance: 459; Referee: Michael Radchuk; Assistant referees: Turan Ozdemir; Samantha Moos; Fourth official: Jessica Bowen

=== *z-Pacific ===
Series History: BYU leads series 4–1
Broadcasters: Alan Sanchez (TheW.tv)

November 1, 2014 19	BYU Cougars	4–0	Pacific Tigers	Stockton, CA
8:00 p.m. MDT	Ashley Hatch 24', 56'; Nadia Gomes 39'; Jaiden Thornock 78'	Recap	Alex Hussar (yellow card) 69'; Malaya Cabrera (yellow card) 80'	Stadium: Knoles Field; Attendance: 250; Referee: Katja Koroleva; Assistant referees: Joseph Dickerson; Luis Ordaz; Fourth official: Victor Rivas

=== *z-Pepperdine ===
Series History: BYU leads series 3–2
Broadcasters: Al Epstein & Jen Karson (TheW.tv)

November 8, 2014 20	BYU Cougars	2–3	Pepperdine Waves	Malibu, CA
2:00 p.m. MST	Ashley Hatch 19'; Niki Fernandes 59'	Report	Amanda LeCave 32'; Colby Carson 43'; Ally Holtz 50'; Kristen Rodriguez (yellow card) 80'	Stadium: Tari Frahm Rokus Field; Attendance: 679; Referee: Allen Chapman; Assistant referees: Cesar Calderon; Kristin Patterson; Fourth official: Kate Chapman

=== x- College Cup: Colorado ===
Series History: BYU leads series 3–1–1
Broadcasters: Ann Schatz & Kyndra de St. Aubin (P12 Mtn & AZ)

November 15, 2014 21	BYU Cougars	0–2	Colorado Buffaloes	Boulder, CO
1:00 p.m. MST		Report	Olivia Pappalardo 7'; Madison Krauser 53'	Stadium: Prentup Field; Attendance: 441; Referee: J.C. Plott; Assistant referees: Adam Finney; Adam Zarrin; Fourth official: William Knause

== Roster ==
No.	Position	Player	Height	Hometown	Year
2	D	Taylor Campbell	5 ft 7 in (170 cm)	Sandy, UT	Freshman
3	F	Carla Swensen	5 ft 3 in (160 cm)	South Jordan, UT	Freshman
4	MF, D	Brittain Dearden	5 ft 9 in (175 cm)	Mercer, NJ	Sophomore
5	MF	Marissa Nimmer	5 ft 6 in (168 cm)	Orem, UT	Junior
6	F	Nadia Gomes	5 ft 6 in (168 cm)	Sandy, UT	Freshman
7	F, MF	Michele Murphy	5 ft 5 in (165 cm)	Sandy, UT	RS Sophomore
8	D	Ella Johnson	5 ft 10 in (178 cm)	Centerville, UT	Sophomore
10	MF	Elisabeth Phillips	5 ft 4 in (163 cm)	Sandy, UT	Freshman
11	GK	Hannah Clark	5 ft 10 in (178 cm)	Danville, CA	RS Freshman
12	D	Avery Calton	5 ft 7 in (170 cm)	Ogden, UT	RS Freshman
13	D	Shaylyn Orr	5 ft 8 in (173 cm)	Draper, UT	Freshman
14	D	Annie Amos	5 ft 7 in (170 cm)	Pleasanton, CA	Senior
15	D	Alyssa Jefferson	5 ft 5 in (165 cm)	Sandy, UT	Freshman
16	MF	Kayci Griffin	5 ft 9 in (175 cm)	Cedar Park, TX	Sophomore
18	GK	Katherine Snyder	5 ft 7 in (170 cm)	Lake Forest, CA	Senior
19	F, MF	Sarah Chambers	5 ft 2 in (157 cm)	Medford, OR	Junior
20	F	Niki Fernandez	5 ft 3 in (160 cm)	Roy, UT	Graduate
21	F	Jaiden Thornock	5 ft 4 in (163 cm)	Ogden, UT	Senior
22	MF, D	Miranda Bailey	5 ft 7 in (170 cm)	Loomis, CA	Sophomore
23	MF	Rachel Bingham	5 ft 3 in (160 cm)	Mapleton, UT	Freshman
24	MF	Stephanie Ringwood	5 ft 9 in (175 cm)	Cottonwood Heights, UT	Freshman
25	D	Camille Green	5 ft 5 in (165 cm)	Bountiful, UT	Junior
26	F	Madie Lyons	5 ft 8 in (173 cm)	Sandy, UT	Freshman
27	MF	Elena Medeiros	5 ft 3 in (160 cm)	Bountiful, UT	Sophomore
28	GK	Hilary Kaufusi	6 ft 0 in (183 cm)	Orem, UT	Junior (currently on Medical RS)
33	F	Ashley Hatch	5 ft 9 in (175 cm)	Gilbert, AZ	Sophomore
