= 2018 BYU Cougars women's soccer team =

American college soccer season

2018 BYU Cougars women's soccer
- Conference: West Coast Conference

Ranking
- Coaches: No. 24
- Record: 13–5–1 (8–1–0 WCC)
- Head coach: Jennifer Rockwood (24th season)
- Home stadium: South Stadium

Uniform
Home	Away

2018 West Coast Conference women's soccer standings
	Conf.						Overall
Team	W		L		T	PCT	W		L		T	PCT
No. 24 BYU ‍†‍‍^{y}	8	–	1	–	0	.889	13	–	5	–	1	.711
No. 7 Santa Clara ‍‍‍^{y}	7	–	2	–	0	.778	17	–	3	–	1	.833
Pepperdine ‍‍‍	6	–	1	–	2	.778	11	–	6	–	2	.632
Gonzaga ‍‍‍	5	–	2	–	2	.667	10	–	4	–	4	.667
San Francisco ‍‍‍	4	–	3	–	2	.556	11	–	7	–	2	.600
Portland ‍‍‍	4	–	5	–	0	.444	11	–	9	–	0	.550
San Diego ‍‍‍	4	–	5	–	0	.444	8	–	9	–	1	.472
Saint Mary's ‍‍‍	2	–	6	–	1	.278	7	–	10	–	2	.421
Loyola Marymount ‍‍‍	1	–	7	–	1	.167	3	–	13	–	4	.250
Pacific ‍‍‍	0	–	9	–	0	.000	2	–	16	–	0	.111
† – Conference champion y – Invited to the NCAA tournament As of November 14, 2018; Rankings from United Soccer Coaches Poll; Source:West Coast Conference

The 2018 BYU Cougars women's soccer team represented BYU during the 2018 NCAA Division I women's soccer season. The Cougars were coached for a 24th consecutive season by Jennifer Rockwood, who was co-coach in 1995 and became the solo head coach in 1996. Before 1995, BYU women's soccer competed as a club team and not as a member of the NCAA. Overall, the Cougars had made the NCAA tournament in 18 of the 23 seasons that Rockwood had been the head coach. Joining Rockwood as assistant coaches were Brent Anderson (2nd season) and Steve Magleby (1st season) with volunteer assistants Rachel Jorgensen (5th season) and McKinzie Young 7th season). The Cougars came off of a season were they fourth in the WCC and went 7–8–4, 4–4–1 in the WCC. The Cougars were picked to finish third by the WCC media. The Cougars stunned the conference and went 8–1 to win the WCC Championship and return to the NCAA Playoffs, where they lost to TCU in the first round. The Cougars finished the season 13–5–1.

== Media ==
=== Television and internet streaming ===
Most BYU women's soccer will have a TV broadcast or internet video stream available. BYUtv and TheW.tv will once again serve as the primary providers. Information on these television broadcasts can be found under each individual match.

=== Nu Skin BYU Sports Network ===
For a fifth consecutive season the BYU Sports Network will air BYU Cougars women's soccer games. Greg Wrubell will provide play-by-play for most games with Jason Shepherd or Robbie Bullough filling-in when Wrubell has football duties. Analysts will rotate. ESPN 960 and BYU Radio will act as the flagship stations for women's soccer.

Affiliates

- BYU Radio- Flagship Station Nationwide (KBYU-HD2, KUMT, Dish Network 980, Sirius XM 143, TuneIn radio, and byuradio.org)
- ESPN 960- Provo, Utah
- ESPN 980 AM and 105.1 FM- Ammon/Idaho Falls/Rexburg, Idaho

== Schedule ==
- WCC game (*)
- Nu Skin BYU Sports Network/ESPN 960 broadcast (x)
- Television Broadcast (y)
- Internet Stream (z)

=== Exhibition: Blue/White Game ===
- Two 40 minute halves made up the exhibition. Coaches were also free to move players from the Blue to the White and vice versa as it was an inter-squad match.

August 4, 2018	BYU White	0–3	BYU Blue	Provo, UT
7:00 p.m. MDT			Madie Gates 13', 34'; Mikayla Colohan 58'	Stadium: South Field; Attendance: N/A; Referee: Not listed

=== Exhibition: UCLA ===
Series History: Series even 2–2–1

August 10, 2018	#2 UCLA Bruins	2–1	BYU Cougars	Los Angeles, CA
6:00 p.m. PDT	Sunny Dunphy 14'; Julia Hernandez 89'	Recap	Elise Flake 25'	Stadium: Drake Stadium; Attendance: N/A; Referee: Not listed

=== x-Exhibition: Alumni ===
Broadcasters: Greg Wrubell & Jennie Smith (BYU Radio/ESPN 960)

August 14, 2018	BYU Cougars	3–2	BYU Alumni	Provo, UT
7:00 p.m. MDT	Lizzy Braby 1', 29'; Bella Folino 19'	Recap	Madie Mathews 51'; Dana Cusick 69'	Stadium: South Field; Attendance: N/A; Referee: Not listed

=== xz-Cal State Fullerton ===
Series History: BYU leads series 6–0–2
Broadcasters: Ryan Osborne (Big West TV)
Greg Wrubell & B.J. Pugmire (BYU Radio/ESPN 960)

August 17, 2018	Cal State Fullerton Titans	0–1	BYU Cougars	Fullerton, CA
8:00 p.m. PDT	Sarah Davidson (yellow card) 97'	Recap	Madie Gates 41' (pen.)	Stadium: Goodwin Field; Attendance: 928; Referee: Andie Reyes; Assistant referees: Adrian Gonzales; Melissa Gonzales; Fourth official: Stacey Littlejohn

=== xz-Nebraska ===
Series History: Nebraska leads series 4–2–0
Broadcasters: No commentators (BTN+)
Greg Wrubell & Jennie Smith (BYU Radio/ESPN 960)

August 20, 2018	Nebraska Cornhuskers	2–2	BYU Cougars	Lincoln, NE
7:05 p.m. CDT	Faith Carter 4'; Savannah Uveges 40'	Recap	Lizzy Braby 77'; Mikayla Colohan 82'	Stadium: Barbara Hibner Soccer Stadium; Attendance: 919; Referee: Jason Francois; Assistant referees: Juan Chamizo; Michael Barton; Fourth official: Justin Demers

=== xz-Texas A&M ===
Series History: First Meeting
Broadcasters: David Ellis & Jeff Givens (SEC+)
Greg Wrubell & Elena Medeiros (BYU Radio/ESPN 960)

August 24, 2018	#9 Texas A&M Aggies	2–0	BYU Cougars	College Station, TX
7:30 p.m. CDT	Kendall Ritchie (yellow card) 11'; Jimena López 41'; Ally Watt 87'	Recap		Stadium: Ellis Field; Attendance: 4,248; Referee: Kyle Phillips; Assistant referees: Chris Scruggs; Bryan Estrada; Fourth official: George Kubove

=== xy-Stanford ===
Series History: Series even 3–3–0
Broadcasters: Spencer Linton, Natalyn Lewis, & Lauren McClain (BYUtv)
Greg Wrubell & Paige Barker (BYU Radio/ESPN 960)

August 30, 2018	BYU Cougars	0–2	#1 Stanford Cardinal	Provo, UT
7:00 p.m. MDT		Recap	Catarina Macario 35'; Jojo Harber 79'	Stadium: South Field; Attendance: 2,272; Referee: Robbi Hullner; Assistant referees: Dani Escalante; Brad Jensen; Fourth official: Blake Jensen

=== xz-Idaho State ===
Series History: BYU leads 8–2–0
Broadcasters: Robbie Bullough & Paige Barker (TheW.tv/ESPN 960)

September 1, 2017	BYU Cougars	10–0	Idaho State Bengals	Provo, UT
7:00 p.m. MDT	Madie Gates 6'; Elise Flake 16'; Mikayla Colohan 23', 55'; Bella Folino 37', 54'; Cameron Tucker 67'; Josie Bush 81'; Natalie Clark 84'; Kendell Petersen 87'	Recap	Paige Smith (yellow card) 81'	Stadium: South Field; Attendance: 2,242; Referee: Hamed Sadeghi; Assistant referees: Sly Yates; Mike Anglin; Fourth official: Allan Pickett

=== xy-Utah ===
Game Name: Deseret First Duel
Series History: BYU leads series 21–7–2
Broadcasters: Kate Scott & Kelly Gray (P12 MTN)
Greg Wrubell & Paige Barker (BYU Radio/ESPN 960)

September 7, 2018	Utah Utes	2–3	BYU Cougars	Salt Lake City, UT
7:00 p.m. MDT	Paola Van Der Veen 76'; Hailey Skolmoski 84'	Recap	Elise Flake 52'; Mikayla Colohan 71'; Madie Gates 85'	Stadium: Ute Field; Attendance: 2,606; Referee: Jeff Arthurholtz; Assistant referees: Karsten Gillwald; Robert Pickett; Fourth official: Hamed Sadeghi

=== y-Marquette ===
This match was originally scheduled for September 14 and 7:00 p.m. and scheduled to be broadcast by the Nu Skin BYU Sports Network. However a field power outage couldn't be resolved in time for the match to take place that evening, so it was rescheduled for Saturday.
Series History: Marquette leads series 2–1–1
Broadcasters: No commentary (MUTV)

September 15, 2018	Marquette Golden Eagles	0–3	BYU Cougars	Marquette, WI
1:00 p.m. CDT		Recap	Madie Gates 18'; Makaylie Moore 45'; Elise Flake 64'; Natalie Clark (yellow card) 73'	Stadium: Valley Fields; Attendance: 205; Referee: Dimtrios Katsimingos; Assistant referees: Peter Bernardy; Art Arustamyan; Fourth official: Michael Wojtan

=== xz-Long Beach State ===
Series History: BYU leads series 7–2–0
Broadcasters: Spencer Linton, Natalyn Lewis, & Lauren McClain (BYUtv.org)
Greg Wrubell & Paige Barker (BYU Radio/ESPN 960)

September 17, 2018	BYU Cougars	1–3	Long Beach State 49ers	Provo, UT
5:30 p.m. MDT	Bella Folino 55'	Recap	Ashley Gonzales 65'; Taylor Bistline 80'; Rola Badawiya 83'	Stadium: South Field; Attendance: 1,339; Referee: Adam Zarrin; Assistant referees: Allan Pickett; Kristi Mae; Fourth official: Marcelo Chapparo

=== xy-Utah Valley ===
Game Name: UCCU Cross-Town Clash
Series History: BYU leads series 3–0–0
Broadcasters: Spencer Linton, Natalyn Lewis, & Lauren McClain (BYUtv)
Greg Wrubell & Paige Barker (BYU Radio/ESPN 960)

September 21, 2018	BYU Cougars	3–1	Utah Valley Wolverines	Provo, UT
7:00 p.m. MDT	Olivia Wade 2'; Bella Folino 52'; Elise Flake 58'; Sabrina Davis (yellow card) 87'	Recap	Linley Brown (yellow card) 77'; Whitney Paskins 83'	Stadium: South Field; Attendance: 2,958; Referee: Mario Coss; Assistant referees: Schuyler Pack; Karsten Gillwald; Fourth official: Michael Anglin

=== xy-Gonzaga* ===
Series History: BYU leads series 10–0–0
Broadcasters: Spencer Linton, Carla Haslam, & Lauren McClain (BYUtv)
Greg Wrubell & Avery Walker (BYU Radio/ESPN 960)

September 27, 2018	BYU Cougars	3–1	Gonzaga Bulldogs	Provo, UT
7:05 p.m. MDT	Elise Flake 6'; Lizzy Braby 21'; Makaylie Moore 72'	Recap	Sophia Braun 56'	Stadium: South Field; Attendance: 2,152; Referee: Megan McCain; Assistant referees: Lisa Homel; Michael Thomas; Fourth official: Karsten Gillwald

=== xz-Portland* ===
Series History: BYU leads series 8–4–0
Broadcasters: Jason Shepherd & Avery Walker (TheW.tv/BYU Radio (KUMT only)/ESPN 960)

September 29, 2018	BYU Cougars	3–0	Portland Pilots	Provo, UT
7:00 p.m. MDT	Alyssa Jefferson (yellow card) 2'; Elise Flake 55'; Lizzy Braby 77'; Cameron Tucker 80'	Recap	Taryn Ries (yellow card) 49'	Stadium: South Field; Attendance: 1,571; Referee: Cuautemoc Delgadillo; Assistant referees: Marcelo Chapparo; Brad Jensen; Fourth official: Alan Jimenez

=== xz-San Diego* ===
Series History: BYU leads series 7–3–0
Broadcasters: Nick Rice (TheW.tv)
Greg Wrubell & Jennie Smith (BYU Radio/ESPN 960)

October 6, 2018	San Diego Toreros	1–2	BYU Cougars	San Diego, CA
7:00 p.m. PDT	Summer Mason 30'	Recap	Madie Gates 59'; Elise Flake 98'	Stadium: Torero Stadium; Attendance: 404; Referee: Andie Reyes; Assistant referees: Maria Magana; Kristin Patterson; Fourth official: Samantha Martinez

=== xz-Pepperdine* ===
Series History: Pepperdine leads series 5–4–0
Broadcasters: Al Epstein (TheW.tv)
Jason Shepherd & Avery Walker (BYU Radio/ESPN 960)

October 13, 2018	Pepperdine Waves	2–1	BYU Cougars	Malibu, CA
1:00 p.m. PDT	Michelle Maemone 2'; Isabel Nelson 78'	Recap	Bella Folino 77'	Stadium: Tari Frahm Rokus Field; Attendance: 572; Referee: Karen Abt; Assistant referees: Karen DeLeon; Melissa Gonzales; Fourth official: Ali Hacock

=== xz-Pacific* ===
Series History: BYU leads series 8–1–0
Broadcasters: Jeff Dominick (TheW.tv)
Greg Wrubell & Elena Medeiros (BYU Radio/ESPN 960)

October 18, 2018	Pacific Tigers	1–5	BYU Cougars	Stockton, CA
7:00 p.m. PDT	Kendall Bietsch 56'	Recap	Makaylie Moore 54'; Elise Flake 56'; Lizzy Braby 63'; Mikayla Colohan 73'; Ashton Brockbank 87'	Stadium: Knoles Field; Attendance: 648; Referee: Ian Chapman; Assistant referees: Mike Kampmeinert; Kevin Pikkel; Fourth official: Luis Ordaz

=== xz-Saint Mary's* ===
Series History: BYU leads series 7–0–1
Broadcasters: (TheW.tv)
Greg Wrubell & Elena Medeiros (BYU Radio/ESPN 960)

October 20, 2018	Saint Mary's Gaels	1–3	BYU Cougars	Moraga, CA
1:00 p.m. PDT	Kelsey Hill 59'	Recap	Elise Flake 11'; Makaylie Moore 27', 36'; Elise Flake (yellow card) 89'	Stadium: Saint Mary's Stadium; Attendance: 457; Referee: Levi Rippy; Assistant referees: Nicholas Navarini; Michelle Macmullen; Fourth official: Val Huerta

=== xy- San Francisco* ===
Series History: BYU leads series 6–2–0
Broadcasters: Spencer Linton, Carla Haslam, & Lauren McClain (BYUtv)
Greg Wrubell & Avery Walker (BYU Radio/ESPN 960)

October 25, 2018	BYU Cougars	4–0	San Francisco Dons	Provo, UT
7:00 p.m. MDT	Makaylie Moore 45'; Elise Flake 63', 64'; Cameron Tucker 86'	Recap		Stadium: South Field; Attendance: 1,875; Referee: Kyle Kazmer; Assistant referees: Karsten Gillwald; Sly Yeates; Fourth official: Mike Anglin

=== xz–Santa Clara* ===
Series History: Santa Clara leads series 7–1–4
Broadcasters: Robbie Bullough & Elena Medeiros (TheW.tv)
Jason Shepherd & Avery Walker (BYU Radio/ESPN 960)

October 27, 2018	BYU Cougars	2–0	#6 Santa Clara Broncos	Provo, UT
5:05 p.m.	Mikayala Colohan 14'; Rachel Lyman 53'; Lizzy Braby (yellow card) 60'; Sabrina Davis (yellow card) 73'; Alyssa Jefferson (yellow card) 88'	Recap	Marika Guay (yellow card) 60'; Maria Sanchez (yellow card) 73'	Stadium: South Field; Attendance: 2,259; Referee: Omeed Azadpour; Assistant referees: Allen Pickett; Marcelo Chaparro; Fourth official: Daniel Spencer-Escal

=== xz-Loyola Marymount* ===
Series History: BYU leads series 7–1–1
Broadcasters: Ray Ferrari (TheW.tv)
Jason Shepherd & Jennie Smith (BYU Radio (KUMT only)/ESPN 960)

November 3, 2018	Loyola Marymount Lions	1–2	BYU Cougars	Los Angeles, CA
6:00 p.m. PDT	Emma Tyrnauer 25'	Recap	Bella Folino 60'; Elise Flake 70'	Stadium: Sullivan Field; Attendance: 573; Referee: Leszek Stalmach; Assistant referees: Salma Perez; Steve Skille; Fourth official: Lexi Farmer

=== xz-TCU ===
Series History: BYU leads series 8–0–0
Broadcasters: Kyle Crews (HF TV)
Jason Shepherd & Avery Walker (BYU Radio (KUMT only)/ESPN 960)

November 9, 2018	TCU Horned Frogs	2–1	#24 BYU Cougars	Ft. Worth, TX
7:00 p.m. CST	Messiah Bright 56'; Yazmeen Ryan 61'; Yazmeen Ryan (yellow card) 73'	Recap	Elise Flake 23'; Rachel Lyman (yellow card) 73'	Stadium: Garvey-Rosenthal Soccer Stadium; Attendance: 972; Referee: Timothy Debysingh; Assistant referees: Jennifer Gamer; Victor Perez; Fourth official: John Navarro

== Roster ==
No.	Position	Player	Height	Hometown	Year
3	MF	Makaylie Moore	5'5"	Auburn, WA	Sophomore
4	MF	Lizzy Braby	5'2"	Murray, UT	Junior
5	F	Elise Flake	5'7"	Mapleton, UT	Junior
6	MF	Ashton Brockbank	5'9"	Provo, UT	Freshman
7	D	Danika Bowman Serassio	5'7"	Redlands, CA	Junior
8	MF	Mikayla Colohan	5'8"	Fruit Heights, UT	Sophomore
9	D	Shaylyn Redding	5'8"	Draper, UT	Sophomore
10	MF, F	Olivia Wade	5'6"	Kaysville, UT	Freshman
12	F	Ella Ballstaedt	5'6"	Midway, UT	Junior
13	F	Lytiana Akinaka	5'6"	Haiku, HI	Freshman
14	F	Josie Guinn	5'5"	Murrieta, CA	Sophomore
16	F	Kendall Petersen	5'8"	South Weber, UT	Freshman
18	GK	Sabrina Macias Davis	5'5"	Littleton, CO	RS Junior
19	F	Natalie Clark	5'8"	Mesa, AZ	Freshman
20	F	Cameron Tucker	5'9"	Highland, UT	Sophomore
21	MF	Madie Siddoway Gates	5'9"	North Logan, UT	Senior
22	MF	Bella Folino	5'6"	Aliso Viejo, CA	Freshman
23	MF	Rachel Bingham Lyman	5'7"	Spanish Fork, UT	RS Junior
24	F, D	Josie Bush	5'2"	Boise, ID	Freshman
25	D	Brynlee Welch Buhler	5'4"	Hyrum, UT	Junior
28	D	Alyssa Jefferson	5'5"	Sandy, UT	Junior
29	GK	Josie Manwill	5'9"	Layton, UT	Sophomore
32	GK	Cassidy Smith	5'9"	Alpine, UT	RS Sophomore

== Rankings ==
+ Regular season polls	Poll	Pre- Season	Week 1	Week 2	Week 3	Week 4	Week 5	Week 6	Week 7	Week 8	Week 9	Week 10	Week 11	Week 12 Postseason	Final
United Soccer Coaches	NR	NR	NR	NR	NR	NR	NR	RV	RV	NR	RV	RV	24		
Soccer America	NR	NR	NR	NR	NR	NR	NR	NR	NR	NR	NR	14	13		
Top Drawer Soccer	NR	NR	NR	NR	NR	NR	NR	NR	NR	NR	NR	25	23		

Legend
	Increase in ranking
	Decrease in ranking
	Not ranked previous week
(RV)	Received Votes
