= 2014 NCAA Division I women's soccer tournament =

Women's College Cup (semifinals & final)

Tournament details
- Country: United States
- Dates: November 14 – December 7
- Teams: 64

Final positions
- Champions: Florida State Seminoles
- Runners-up: Virginia Cavaliers
- Semifinalists: Stanford Cardinal; Texas A&M Aggies

Tournament statistics
- Matches played: 63
- Goals scored: 208 (3.3 per match)

The 2014 NCAA Division I women's soccer championship was the 33rd edition of the tournament. The first round of the tournament began on November 14 and concluded with the College Cup final match at FAU Stadium in Boca Raton, Florida on December 7, 2014. The Florida State Seminoles defeated the Virginia Cavaliers 1–0 in the final to win their first championship.

== Format ==
Since 2001, the NCAA Division I Women's Soccer Tournament, the tournament features 64 teams in a single-elimination tournament. The 64-team tournament draws from a possible field of 332 teams. Of the 64 berths, 31 are allocated to the conference tournament or regular season winners. The remaining 33 berths are supposed to be determined through an at-large process based upon teams' Ratings Percentage Index (RPI) that did not win their conference tournament.

The NCAA Selection Committee names the top sixteen seeds for the tournament for home field hosting through the quarterfinal matches while teams that do not receive a seed are placed in matches to reduce travel. The 16 seeded teams and teams from the same conference cannot play each other in the first-round or second-round.

=== Seeded teams ===
Seed	Team	Conference	Record	Berth type
#1	Florida State	Atlantic Coast	18–1–1	Conference Tournament
#1	Stanford	Pac-12	17–1–2	At-large
#1	Texas A&M	Southeastern	18–2–2	Conference Tournament
#1	UCLA	Pac-12	18–0–2	Conference champion
#2	Florida	Southeastern	14–4–1	At-large
#2	North Carolina	Atlantic Coast	12–3–2	At-large
#2	Penn State	Big Ten	17–3–0	At-large
#2	Virginia	Atlantic Coast	18–2–0	At-large
#3	Kentucky	Southeastern	15–6–0	At-large
#3	South Carolina	Southeastern	13–5–3	At-large
#3	Texas Tech	Big 12	14–3–2	At-large
#3	West Virginia	Big 12	16–2–3	Conference Tournament
#4	Notre Dame	Atlantic Coast	12–5–2	At-large
#4	Pepperdine Waves	West Coast	15–2–3	At-large
#4	Washington	Pac-12	12–6–2	At-large
#4	Wisconsin	Big Ten	18–2–2	Conference Tournament

=== Teams ===
UCLA Regional
Seed	School	Conference	Berth Type	Record
	Arizona State	Pac-12	At-large	11-5-4
	Central Conn. State	Northeast	Automatic	11-5-4
	Harvard	Ivy League	Automatic	10-4-2
	High Point	Big South	Automatic	12-4-4
	Illinois State	Missouri Valley	Automatic	15-5
3	Kentucky	SEC	At-large	15-6
	La Salle	Atlantic 10	At-large	14-5-2
	Northern Arizona	Big Sky	Automatic	12-5-4
4	Pepperdine	West Coast	At-large	15-2-3
	Rutgers	Big Ten	At-large	12-5-1
	San Diego	West Coast	At-large	10-7-2
	SIU Edwardsville	Ohio Valley	Automatic	13-6-1
	South Florida	American	At-large	13-6-2
1	UCLA	Pac-12	Automatic	18-0-2
	USC	Pac-12	At-large	12-6-2
2	Virginia	ACC	At-large	18-2

Florida State Regional
Seed	School	Conference	Berth Type	Record
	Boston U.	Patriot	Automatic	14-4-3
	BYU	West Coast	Automatic	13-4-3
	Clemson	ACC	At-large	13-3-2
	Colorado	Pac-12	At-large	13-6-1
	DePaul	Big East	Automatic	16-0-4
1	Florida State	ACC	Automatic	18-1-1
	Georgia	SEC	At-large	10-7-2
2	North Carolina	ACC	At-large	12-3-2
	Northeastern	CAA	Automatic	14-4-3
	Seattle	WAC	Automatic	14-4-2
	South Alabama	Sun Belt	Automatic	19-2-1
3	South Carolina	SEC	At-large	13-5-3
	South Dakota State	Summit	Automatic	10-7-2
	UCF	American	At-large	16-4
	Washington State	Pac-12	At-large	10-4-4
4	Wisconsin	Big Ten	Automatic	18-2-2

Texas A&M Regional
Seed	School	Conference	Berth Type	Record
	Arizona	Pac-12	At-large	10-7-2
	Buffalo	MAC	Automatic	16-2-3
	Connecticut	American	Automatic	13-4-5
	Dayton	Atlantic 10	Automatic	12-8-2
	Georgetown	Big East	At-large	11-4-5
	Houston Baptist	Southland	Automatic	10-6-5
	New Hampshire	America East	Automatic	08-8-4
4	Notre Dame	ACC	At-large	12-5-2
	Oklahoma State	Big 12	At-large	10-9-1
2	Penn State	Big Ten	At-large	17-3
	Rice	Conference USA	Automatic	14-3-3
	Texas	Big 12	At-large	10-7-4
1	Texas A&M	SEC	Automatic	18-2-2
	Valparaiso	Horizon	Automatic	14-1-4
	Virginia Tech	ACC	At-large	14-5
3	West Virginia	Big 12	Automatic	16-2-3

Stanford Regional
Seed	School	Conference	Berth Type	Record
	Arkansas	SEC	At-large	08-6-6
	Auburn	SEC	At-large	11-6-3
	Cal State Fullerton	Big West	Automatic	10-7-4
	California	Pac-12	At-large	13-5-2
2	Florida	SEC	At-large	14-4-1
	Florida Gulf Coast	Atlantic Sun	Automatic	17-3
	Kansas	Big 12	At-large	15-5
	Mercer	Southern	Automatic	14-5-2
	Missouri	SEC	At-large	11-6-3
	Oklahoma	Big 12	At-large	10-8-4
	Prairie View A&M	SWAC	Automatic	11-8-1
	Rider	MAAC	Automatic	12-5-3
	San Diego State	Mountain West	Automatic	15-4-2
1	Stanford	Pac-12	At-large	17-1-2
3	Texas Tech	Big 12	At-large	14-3-2
4	Washington	Pac-12	At-large	12-6-2

== Bracket ==
=== Bracket 1 ===
First Round; Round of 64
1	UCLA	5
San Diego	0
.	Central Connecticut	0
Harvard	6
.	South Florida	2
Illinois State	3
USC	1.(2)
4	Pepperdine	1.(4)
3	Kentucky	0.(4)
SIU Edwardsville	0.(2)
.	Northern Arizona	2
Arizona State	4
.	Rutgers	2
La Salle	0
High Point	0
2	Virginia	8

Second Round; Round of 32
1	UCLA	7
Harvard	0
Illinois State	0
4	Pepperdine	4
3	Kentucky	3
Arizona State	1
Rutgers	0
2	Virginia	3

Third Round; Round of 16
1	UCLA	1
4	Pepperdine	0
3	Kentucky	0
2	Virginia	7

Quarterfinals; Round of 8
1	UCLA	1
2	Virginia	2

=== Bracket 2 ===
First Round; Round of 64
1	Texas A&M	5
Houston Baptist	0
.	Arizona	1
Oklahoma State	0
.	Texas	3
Rice	0
Valparaiso	0
4	Notre Dame	1
3	West Virginia	0.(3)
Georgetown	0.(4)
.	Dayton	0
Virginia Tech	4
.	Connecticut	2
New Hampshire	0
Buffalo	1
2	Penn State	4

Second Round; Round of 32
1	Texas A&M	7
Arizona	2
Texas	1
4	Notre Dame	2
.	Georgetown	3
Virginia Tech	4
Connecticut	0
2	Penn State	1

Third Round; Round of 16
1	Texas A&M	2
4	Notre Dame	1
Virginia Tech	1
2	Penn State	2

Quarterfinals; Round of 8
1	Texas A&M	2
2	Penn State	1

=== Bracket 3 ===
First Round; Round of 64
1	Florida State	5
South Alabama	0
.	Northeastern	2
Boston University	0
.	Central Florida	2
Georgia	1
DePaul	0
4	Wisconsin	2
3	South Carolina	0.(4)
Clemson	0.(3)
.	Seattle	2
Washington State	1
.	Colorado	2
BYU	0
South Dakota State	0
2	North Carolina	2

Second Round; Round of 32
1	Florida State	3
Northeastern	0
UCF	3
4	Wisconsin	2
3	South Carolina	0.(2)
Seattle	0.(1)
Colorado	0
2	North Carolina	1

Third Round; Round of 16
1	Florida State	1
UCF	0
3	South Carolina	1
2	North Carolina	0

Quarterfinals; Round of 8
1	Florida State	5
3	South Carolina	0

=== Bracket 4 ===
First Round; Round of 64
1	Stanford	5
Cal State Fullerton	2
.	Arkansas	3
Oklahoma	2
.	Kansas	1
Missouri	3
Rider	0
4	Washington	1
3	Texas Tech	8
Prairie View A&M	0
.	Auburn	1
Florida Gulf Coast	0
.	California	3
San Diego State	2
Mercer	0
2	Florida	3

Second Round; Round of 32
1	Stanford	1
Arkansas	0
Missouri	0
4	Washington	1
3	Texas Tech	2
Auburn	1
California	1
2	Florida	3

Third Round; Round of 16
1	Stanford	1
4	Washington	0
3	Texas Tech	2
2	Florida	3

Quarterfinals; Round of 8
1	Stanford	2.(4)
2	Florida	2.(3)

=== College Cup ===
Semifinals
2	Virginia	3
1	Texas A&M	1
1	Florida State	2
1	Stanford	0

Final
2	Virginia	0
1	Florida State	1
