= Ann Schatz =

American journalist

- Born: Omaha, Nebraska

Ann Schatz is a sports broadcaster who works for CBS Sports Network, ESPN, Pac-12 Network, Westwood One, and the Portland Thorns FC.

== Early life ==
Schatz was born and raised in Omaha, Nebraska, as one of six siblings. Schatz attended Creighton University, where she played basketball and softball for the Bluejays. Schatz graduated with a degree in journalism and mass communications. After graduation, Schatz became the first female sports reporter ever in Omaha, covering the weekend sports news.

In 1989, Schatz and her family moved to Portland, Oregon. KOIN hired Schatz to be the first female sports reporter for the Portland area, a position she held until 2005. Ten years after arriving in Portland, Schatz was hired to be the Portland Trail Blazers sideline reporter, video feature writer, and producer.

Schatz is recognized nationally as being the first women's sports reporter in two markets, Omaha and Portland.

== Broadcasting ==
In 2005, Schatz left the Trail Blazers and KOIN to begin a new broadcasting endeavor, calling sporting events for College Sports Television (CSTV). While at CSTV, Schatz acted as a play-by-play announcer or analyst for women's basketball, women's soccer, and softball. Schatz remained with CSTV through their transition to CBS College Sports and continues to call games with them today as part of the CBS Sports Network. When not working for CSTV, Schatz acted in a similar position for Fox Sports Net, calling Pac-12 women's games, and for the Mtn., calling women's Mountain West Conference games. In 2013, FSN lost broadcast rights to the women's games and Mtn. closed its doors, but Schatz didn't lose her place; Schatz was hired by Pac-12 Network to be one of their many basketball analysts.

Schatz was also hired by ESPN to call select WNBA games and to work on feature stories. Her ESPN work was featured heavily during the 2014 Winter Olympics. Schatz received nationwide recognition for the special feature on Nancy Kerrigan and Tonya Harding 20-years later. Schatz had been asked to do a profile on Harding while she was at KOIN. That profile would be used and credited as part of the 20-year recap.

Today, Schatz continues to be recognized for her sporting broadcasts. Among her many broadcasts are the Summer and Winter Olympics (KOIN), the Boston Marathon (ESPN), men's and women's basketball (CBS Sports Network, Pac-12 Networks, NBC Sports, Westwood One), the WNBA Playoffs (ESPN), the US Women's Open Golf Champions (ESPN), and being the voice of the Thorns.

When she isn't calling sporting events, Schatz also works as a motivational speaker.
