= Ashley Hatch =

American soccer player (born 1995)

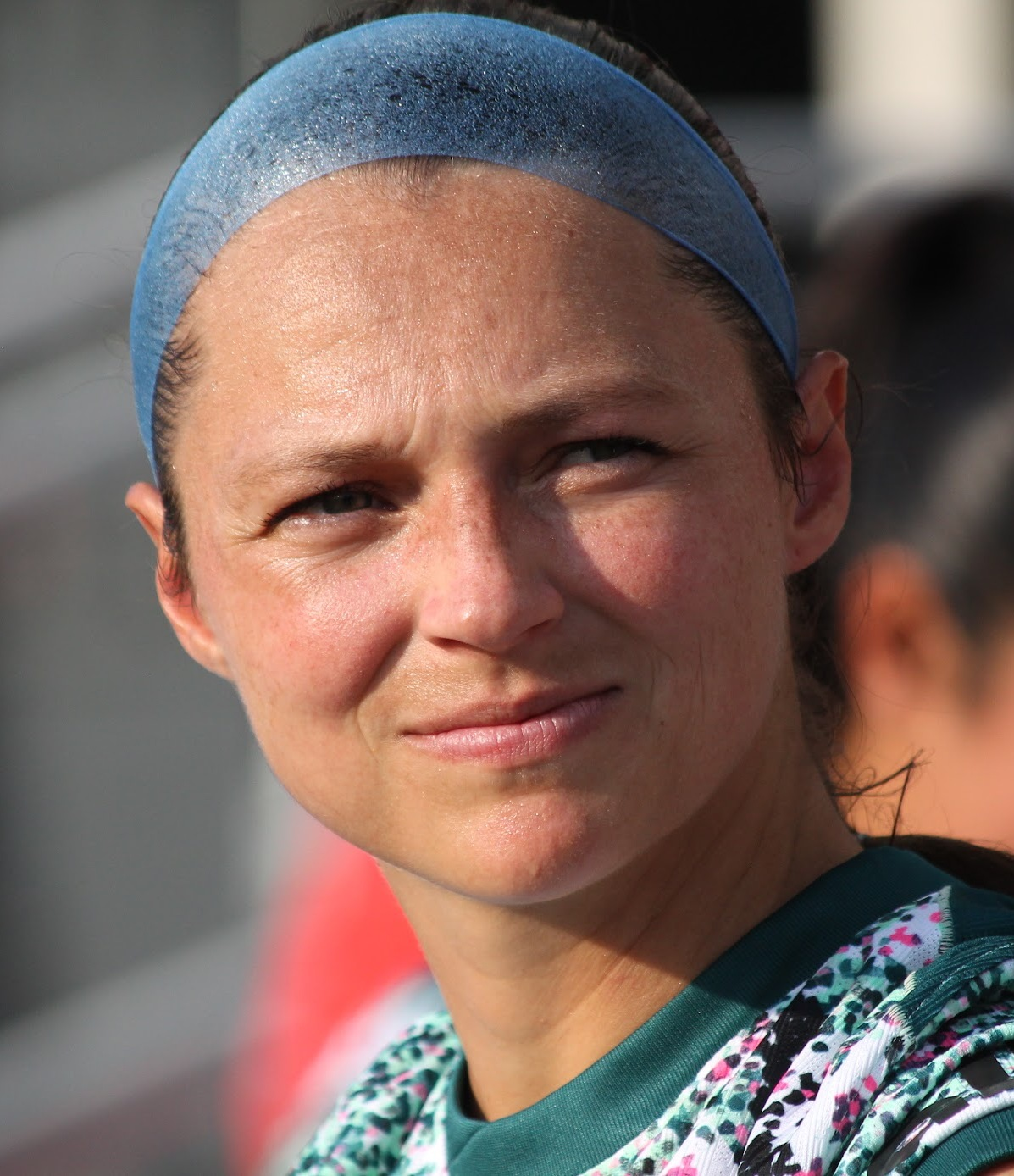
- Hatch with the Washington Spirit in 2026

Personal information
- Full name: Ashley Marie Hatch
- Date of birth: May 25, 1995 (age 31)
- Place of birth: San Dimas, California, United States
- Height: 5 ft 9 in (1.75 m)
- Position: Forward

Team information
- Current team: Washington Spirit
- Number: 33

Youth career
- Arizona Arsenal 95 Premier Teal

College career
Years	Team	Apps	(Gls)
2013–2016	BYU Cougars	75	(47)

Senior career*
Years	Team	Apps	(Gls)
2017	North Carolina Courage	24	(7)
2017–2018	→ Melbourne City (loan)	14	(2)
2018–	Washington Spirit	150	(52)

International career^{‡}
2015–2018	United States U23		
2016–	United States	23	(5)

Managerial career
- 2018: Utah Valley Wolverines (assistant)
- * Club domestic league appearances and goals as of 05:25, November 15, 2026 (UTC) ‡ National team caps and goals as of April 5, 2025

Ashley Marie Hatch (born May 25, 1995) is an American professional soccer player who plays as a forward for the Washington Spirit of the National Women's Soccer League (NWSL) and the United States national team.

Hatch played college soccer for the BYU Cougars before being selected by the Courage as the second overall pick in the 2017 NWSL College Draft. She helped the Courage win the NWSL Shield that season and was named the Rookie of the Year. The next season, she was traded to the Spirit, where she won the NWSL Golden Boot and the NWSL Championship in 2021.

== College career ==
Hatch attended Brigham Young University (BYU) where she played for the BYU Cougars women's soccer team from 2013 to 2016 in the West Coast Conference (WCC). During her freshman season, she started in all 21 games, scored six goals and provided seven assists. She earned All-WCC Freshman Team honors and was named an All-West Honorable Mention, CollegeSportsMadness.com's WCC Freshman of the Year, and was ranked 82nd in the Freshman Top 100 by Top Drawer Soccer. During her sophomore season in 2014, Hatch's 15 shots in one match set a new school record. Her 18 goals tied for fifth highest in the program's history. She scored multiple goals in five games which ranked second in the program's history and first since 1996. Hatch ranked ninth for goals scored per game, points per game and total goals scored per game nationwide. She was named Player of the Week by ESPNW on October 15 and was named WCC Co-Player of the Year. Hatch earned All-WCC First Team and NSCAA All-West Region First Team honors.

As a junior in 2015, Hatch started in 10 of the 13 games she played. She suffered an injury that prevented her from playing for the majority of the season. She scored four goals—including three game-winning goals— and recorded two assists. Hatch was ranked best player in the West Coast Conference by Top Drawer Soccer in 2015 and 2016. During her senior season, Hatch scored a hat-trick against Penn State in August and was named Player of the Week by ESPNW for a second time. She was also named NCAA and WCC Player of the Week. Hatch started in all twenty matches, scored 19 goals and recorded six assists during the season. She was named a semifinalist for the Hermann Trophy and was ranked the seventh best player in the country by Top Drawer Soccer.

== Club career ==
=== North Carolina Courage, 2017 ===
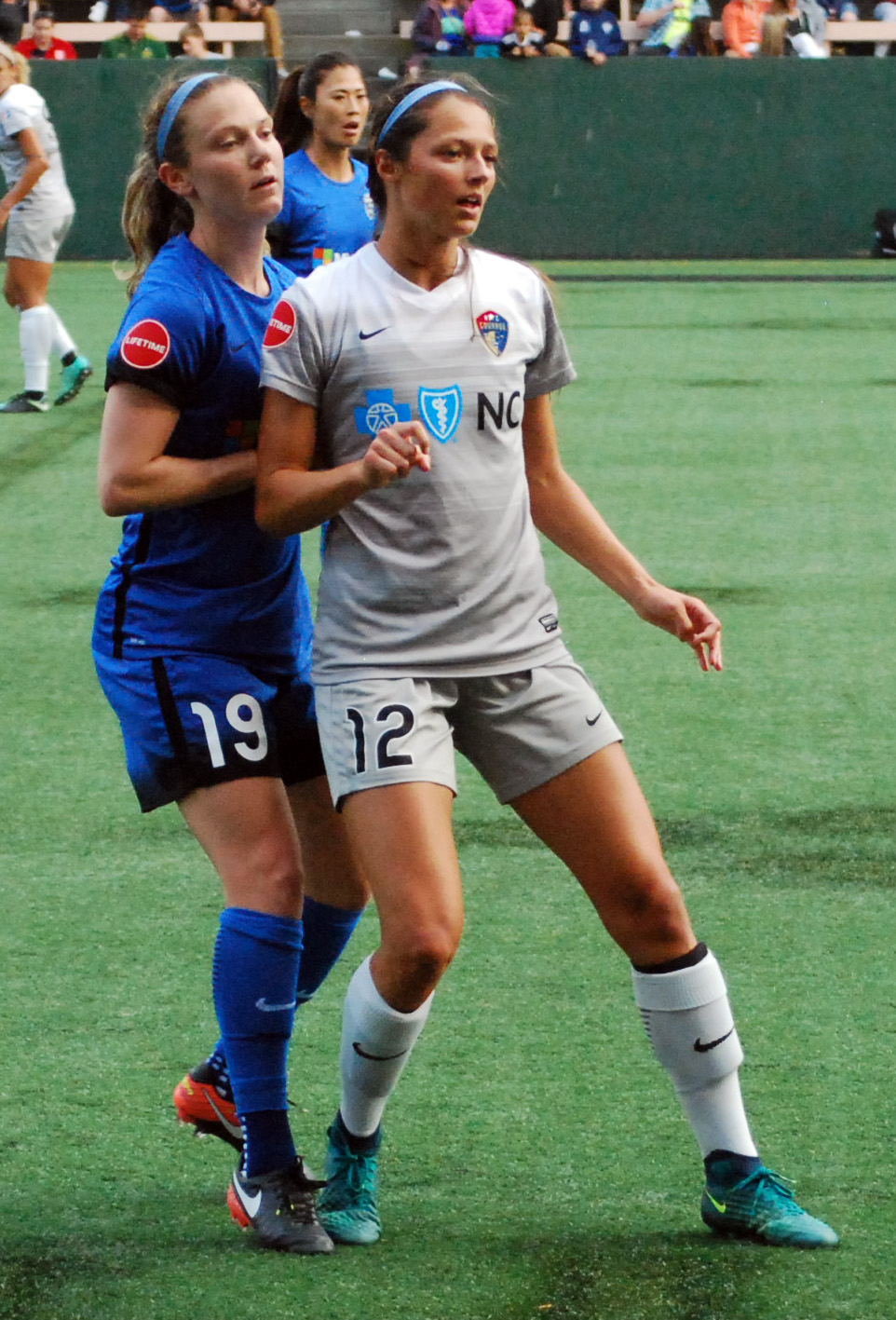
Hatch (right) with the North Carolina Courage in 2017

Hatch was selected by the North Carolina Courage as the second overall pick of the 2017 NWSL College Draft. She signed with the team on April 10, 2017. She made her debut for the club during its second match of the 2017 season: a 1–0 win over Portland Thorns FC on April 17. Hatch scored her first goal on June 3 during a 2–0 win against FC Kansas City. During a match against the Boston Breakers on June 24, she scored the game-winning goal in the Courage's 1–0 win. She scored the game-winning goals in matches against the Seattle Reign FC on July 8 and Washington Spirit on August 19.

The Courage finished the regular season in first place with a 16–7–1 record winning the NWSL Shield and was the first team to secure a spot in the NWSL Playoffs after a 4–0 win over the Houston Dash where Hatch scored the fourth goal. Hatch scored seven goals in her 24 appearances for the Courage. After defeating the Chicago Red Stars 1–0 in the semi-finals and advancing to the NWSL Championship Final, the Courage lost 1–0 to the Portland Thorns FC.

Hatch was named NWSL Rookie of the Year after recording seven goals (including three game-winning goals) and one assist in her first professional season, which helped the Courage win the 2017 NWSL Shield.

==== Melbourne City, 2017–2018 (loan) ====
In October 2017, Hatch joined defending W-League champions Melbourne City for the 2017–18 W-League season. She was a regular contributor to the W-League champions earning 14 appearances and scoring twice. City's success brought them to the Grand Final against Sydney FC where Hatch helped City to a third-consecutive title.

=== Washington Spirit, 2018–present ===
In January 2018, Hatch was traded to the Washington Spirit along with teammate Taylor Smith in exchange for Crystal Dunn's rights. She made her club debut on March 24, 2018, in a 2–1 loss to the Seattle Reign. She finished the season with a team-high 4 goals and 1 assist in 22 games (all starts) as the Spirit placed eighth of nine teams.

Hatch started all 24 games in the 2019 season, matching her rookie output with 7 goals and 2 assists. Washington came in 5th place, missing the playoffs.

The NWSL cancelled the 2020 regular season due to the COVID-19 pandemic and instead held two competitions, the Challenge Cup and Fall Series. Hatch appeared in all 5 games (4 starts) for the Spirit in the Challenge Cup, scoring 1 goal with 1 assist. She made her penalty kick in a shootout loss to Sky Blue FC in the quarterfinals.

Hatch scored a brace for the Spirit in a 2–0 win against her former team North Carolina Courage on July 10, 2021. She finished the 2021 regular season as the NWSL's top scorer, winning the Golden Boot with 10 goals in 20 games (18 starts). She helped the Spirit place third in the league. In the playoffs, she scored the winning goal in a 1–0 win against North Carolina in extra time in the quarterfinals, finishing off the rebound of Trinity Rodman's shot. Washington went on to win the NWSL Championship, defeating the Chicago Red Stars 2–1 in extra time. She was named to the NWSL Best XI at the end of the season.

Ahead of the 2022 regular season, Hatch led the Spirit to the final of the 2022 NWSL Challenge Cup, scoring 6 goals in 8 games. She made her penalty kick in a shootout win against OL Reign in the Challenge Cup semifinals and scored in a 2–1 loss to the North Carolina Courage in the final. She led Washington in scoring with 9 goals (of which 3 were penalties) in 18 games (16 starts) in the 2022 regular season. However, the Spirit dropped to 11th place of 12 teams.

Hatch scored 11 goals (including 5 penalties) with 2 assists in 22 games (all starts) in the 2023 regular season. Washington finished 8th of 12 teams. She also scored 2 goals in 4 games of the 2023 NWSL Challenge Cup. She was named in the NWSL Second XI after the season.

Hatch appeared in 24 games (16 starts) in the 2024 regular season, scoring 7 goals (including 3 penalties) with 3 assists. Washington finished second in the league behind the Orlando Pride. She started all 3 playoff games, converted the first penalty in a shootout win against NJ/NY Gotham FC in the semifinals, before losing 1–0 to Orlando in the title game.

Washington got some revenge for their championship loss by defeating Orlando in the 2025 NWSL Challenge Cup in penalties. Hatch converted the Spirit's opening penalty kick in the shootout.

== International career ==
Hatch made her senior national team debut for the United States on October 19, 2016, in a friendly match against Switzerland and her second appearance on April 5, 2018, against Mexico.

On August 23, 2018, Hatch was named to the United States U-23 team for the 2018 Nordic tournament.

On November 9, 2021, Hatch was named to the USWNT for 2 friendlies in Australia. In the first of the two against Australia, Hatch scored 24 seconds into the game to record her first International goal.

== Coaching career ==
On July 2, 2018, Utah Valley University announced they had hired Hatch as a volunteer assistant coach for the 2018 season. Hatch's sister Brianna played on the UVU soccer team from 2018-2019.

== Personal life ==
Hatch was born in California and spent most of her years growing up in Utah and Arizona. She has three younger siblings. She is a member of the Church of Jesus Christ of Latter-day Saints and attended Brigham Young University. Hatch married Jeff Van Buren in 2019.

In July 2024, Hatch was one of five active NWSL players who represented the NWSL Players Association at the final negotiations in Philadelphia that updated the league's collective bargaining agreement through 2030.

== Career statistics ==
=== International ===
As of match played April 5, 2025

Appearances and goals by national team and year
National team	Year	Apps	Goals
United States	2016	1	0
United States	2017	0	0
United States	2018	1	0
United States	2019	0	0
United States	2020	0	0
United States	2021	2	2
United States	2022	10	2
United States	2023	8	1
United States	2024	0	0
United States	2025	1	0
Total		23	5

Scores and results list United States's goal tally first, score column indicates score after each Hatch goal.

List of international goals scored by Ashley Hatch
No.	Date	Venue	Opponent	Score	Result	Competition	Ref.
1	November 27, 2021	Sydney, Australia	Australia	1–0	3–0	Friendly	
2	November 30, 2021	Newcastle, Australia	Australia	1–0	1–1	Friendly	
3	February 20, 2022	Carson, California	New Zealand	4–0	5–0	2022 SheBelieves Cup	
4	April 9, 2022	Columbus, Ohio	Uzbekistan	8–1	9–1	Friendly	
5	January 21, 2023	Auckland, New Zealand	New Zealand	1–0	5–0	Friendly	

== Honors ==
North Carolina Courage

- NWSL Shield: 2017

Melbourne City

- W-League: 2017–18

Washington Spirit

- NWSL Championship: 2021
- NWSL Challenge Cup: 2025

United States

- CONCACAF Women's Championship: 2022
- SheBelieves Cup: 2022, 2023

Individual

- NWSL Team of the Month: June 2017
- NWSL Rookie of the Year: 2017
- NWSL Golden Boot: 2021
