= List of NCAA Division I women's soccer season goals leaders =

In women's college soccer in the United States, the National Collegiate Athletic Association's (NCAA) Division I goalscoring title is awarded to the player with the highest goals per game average in a given season. While the NCAA began sponsoring women's soccer in 1982, it only began tracking complete weekly and annual statistics in the 1998 season.

== Key ==
*	Awarded a national player of the year award: Hermann Trophy (1988–present); Honda Sports Award (1988–present)
§	Elected to the National Soccer Hall of Fame

== Annual goals per game leaders ==
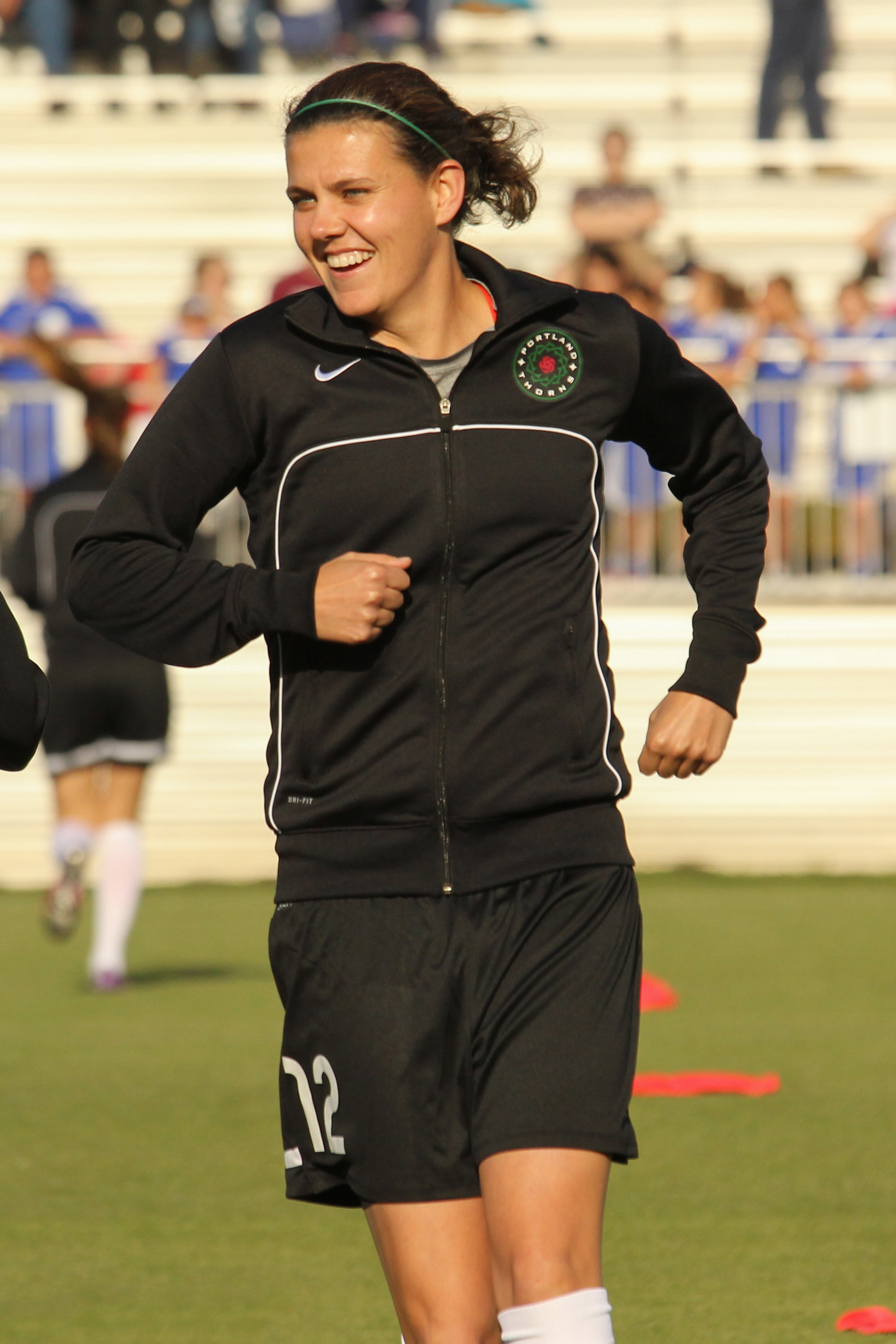
Goalscoring champion Christine Sinclair led the Portland Pilots to the NCAA Division I championship in 2005.

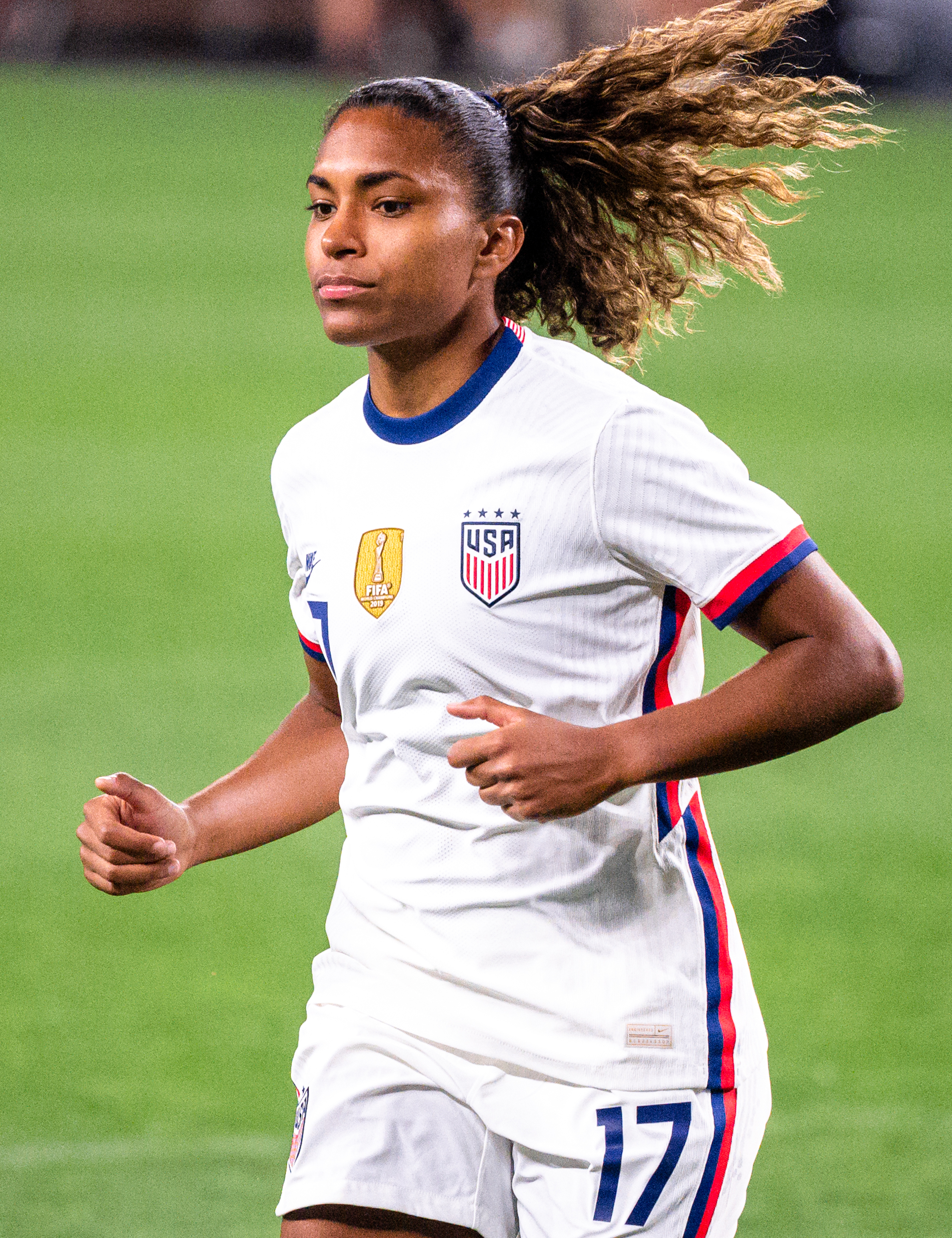
Goalscoring champion Catarina Macario led the Stanford Cardinal to the NCAA Division I championship in 2019.

NCAA Division I women's soccer annual goals per game leaders
Year	Player	College	Class	Goals	Games	Rate	Notes
1982	Jenny Fechner	Santa Clara		27	18	1.50	
1984	Carin Jennings §	UC Santa Barbara		34	22	1.55	
1985	Jane Baker	Niagara		21	13	1.62	
1987	Lisa Cole	SMU		37	21	1.76	
1990	Kim Lynass	Washington State		30	20	1.50	
1991	Tiffeny Milbrett §	Portland		25	17	1.47	
1992	Tiffeny Milbrett § (2)	Portland		30	22	1.36	
1994	Jenn Stephenson	Campbell		27	16	1.69	
1996	Danielle Fotopoulos	Florida		34	22	1.55	
1997	Kelly Smith	Seton Hall	Sophomore	25	15	1.67	
1998	Kelly Smith (2)	Seton Hall	Junior	24	17	1.41	
1999	Kelly Smith (3)	Seton Hall	Senior	27	19	1.42	
2000	Lara Brown	Centenary (LA)	Sophomore	23	18	1.28	
2001	Abby Wambach §	Florida	Senior	31	24	1.29	
2002	Rosie Luzak	Niagara	Junior	25	18	1.39	
2003	Ashley Boutte	Southern	Freshman	25	13	1.92	
2004	Emily Parmarter	Jackson State	Sophomore	21	18	1.17	
2005	Christine Sinclair *	Portland	Senior	39	25	1.56	
2006	Belinda Kanda	Alabama A&M	Sophomore	20	16	1.25	
2007	Naira Crimiel	Jackson State	Freshman	18	17	1.06	
2008	Jade West	Arkansas–Pine Bluff	Freshman	17	16	1.06	
2009	Sarah Hagen	Milwaukee	Sophomore	24	21	1.14	
2010	Christen Press *	Stanford	Senior	26	26	1.00	
2011	Sarah Hagen (2)	Milwaukee	Senior	26	21	1.24	
2012	Ramey Kerns	East Tennessee State	Junior	21	18	1.17	
2013	Elise Krieghoff	Cal Poly	Sophomore	21	19	1.11	
2014	Hannah Short	East Tennessee State	Junior	27	21	1.29	
2015	Nykosi Simmons	Mississippi Valley State	Senior	26	22	1.18	
2016	Laadi Issaka	Mississippi Valley State	Junior	19	16	1.19	
2017	Hayley Younginer	Wofford	Sophomore	21	19	1.11	
2018	Evelyne Viens	South Florida	Junior	20	19	1.05	
2019	Catarina Macario *	Stanford	Junior	32	25	1.28	
2020	Kailey Pena	Grambling State	Junior	16	12	1.33	
2021	Nicole Douglas	Arizona State	Senior	19	20	0.95	
2022	Rebecca Cooke	Quinnipiac	Junior	22	19	1.16	
2023	Eleanor Dale	Nebraska	Senior	28	24	1.17	
2024	Faith Webber	Utah Valley	Senior	18	19	0.95	
2025	Erika Zschuppe	Florida Gulf Coast	Senior	21	17	1.24	

== Annual goals leaders ==
NCAA Division I women's soccer annual goals leaders
Year	Player	College	Goals	Games	Rate	Notes
1984	Carin Jennings §	UC Santa Barbara	34	22	1.55	
1986	Karen Kazmaier	Dayton	30	22	1.36	
1987	Lisa Cole	SMU	37	21	1.76	
1990	Kim Lynass	Washington State	30	20	1.50	
1994	Tiffeny Milbrett §	Portland	30	22	1.36	
1996	Shauna Rohbock	BYU	35	23	1.52	
1998	Danielle Fotopoulos *	Florida	32	26	1.23	
2001	Abby Wambach §	Florida	31	24	1.29	
2002	Marilyn Marin	North Texas	26	19	1.37	
2002	Christine Sinclair *	Portland	26	21	1.24	
2003	Natasha Kai	Hawaii	29	19	1.53	
2004	Tiffany Weimer	Penn State	26	23	1.13	
2005	Christine Sinclair * (2)	Portland	39	25	1.56	
2006	Kala Morgan	Middle Tennessee	22	21	1.05	
2006	Kerri Hanks *	Notre Dame	22	27	0.81	
2007	Ashlee Pistorius *	Texas A&M	25	24	1.04	
2008	Casey Nogueira *	North Carolina	25	28	0.89	
2009	Kelley O'Hara *	Stanford	26	26	1.00	
2010	Christen Press *	Stanford	26	26	1.00	
2011	Maya Hayes	Penn State	31	26	1.19	
2012	Ramey Kerns	East Tennessee State	21	18	1.17	
2012	Taylor Uhl	Minnesota	21	20	1.05	
2012	Tiffany Cameron	Ohio State	21	22	0.95	
2013	Rachel Daly	St. John's	23	21	1.10	
2013	Jannelle Flaws	Illinois	23	23	1.00	
2014	Hannah Short	East Tennessee State	27	21	1.29	
2015	Nykosi Simmons	Mississippi Valley State	26	22	1.18	
2016	Alexis Kiehl	Dayton	21	22	0.95	
2016	Stephanie Ribeiro	UConn	21	23	0.91	
2017	Hayley Younginer	Wofford	21	19	1.11	
2018	Evelyne Viens	South Florida	20	19	1.05	
2018	Raimee Sherle	Boise State	20	20	1.00	
2019	Catarina Macario *	Stanford	32	25	1.28	
2020	Kailey Pena	Grambling State	16	12	1.33	
2020	Sydney Carr	Seattle	16	17	0.94	
2021	Nicole Douglas	Arizona State	19	20	0.95	
2022	Rebecca Cooke	Quinnipiac	22	19	1.16	
2023	Eleanor Dale	Nebraska	28	24	1.17	
2024	Kate Faasse *	North Carolina	20	27	0.74	
2025	Faith Webber	Utah Valley	22	22	1.00	
2025	Hope Leyba	Colorado	22	24	0.92	
