= Olivia Page =

Olivia Page may refer to:

- Olivia Page (footballer, born 2005), New Zealand association footballer
- Olivia Page (American soccer), American college soccer player

== See also ==
- Olivia Paige (born 1991), Playboy Playmate of the Month for September 2010
