= Aaron Franklin =

Aaron Franklin may refer to:

- Aaron D. Franklin, American electrical engineer and professor
- Aaron Franklin, American restaurateur and founder of Franklin Barbecue in Austin, Texas
- Aaron Franklin Shull (1881–1961), American zoologist

== See also ==
- Aaron Brink, born Aaron Franklin Brink
