= 2024 Big 12 Conference women's soccer tournament =

Collegiate women's soccer tournament

- Classification: Division I
- Teams: 12
- Matches: 11
- Site: CPKC Stadium; Kansas City, Missouri
- Champions: Kansas (2nd title)
- Winning coach: Nate Lie (1st title)
- MVP: Lexi Watts (Offensive); Sophie Dawe (Defensive) (Kansas)
- Broadcast: ESPN+

2024 Big 12 Conference women's soccer standings
| | Conf. | | | | | | Overall |
| Team | W | | L | | T | PCT | W | | L | | T | PCT |
|---|---|---|---|---|---|---|---|---|---|---|---|---|
| No. 16 TCU ‍†‍‍^{y} | 9 | – | 0 | – | 2 | .909 | 17 | – | 4 | – | 2 | .783 |
| No. 24 Texas Tech ‍‍‍^{y} | 8 | – | 1 | – | 2 | .818 | 15 | – | 5 | – | 2 | .727 |
| West Virginia ‍‍‍^{y} | 8 | – | 2 | – | 1 | .773 | 12 | – | 5 | – | 3 | .675 |
| BYU ‍‍‍^{y} | 6 | – | 2 | – | 3 | .682 | 9 | – | 7 | – | 5 | .548 |
| Oklahoma State ‍‍‍^{y} | 6 | – | 3 | – | 2 | .636 | 14 | – | 5 | – | 3 | .705 |
| Kansas ‍‍‡‍^{y} | 6 | – | 4 | – | 1 | .591 | 13 | – | 6 | – | 4 | .652 |
| Arizona ‍‍‍ | 6 | – | 4 | – | 1 | .591 | 11 | – | 6 | – | 2 | .632 |
| Utah ‍‍‍ | 5 | – | 3 | – | 3 | .591 | 8 | – | 6 | – | 5 | .553 |
| Colorado ‍‍‍^{y} | 4 | – | 2 | – | 5 | .591 | 12 | – | 5 | – | 5 | .659 |
| Baylor ‍‍‍ | 2 | – | 5 | – | 4 | .364 | 8 | – | 8 | – | 5 | .500 |
| Arizona State ‍‍‍ | 3 | – | 7 | – | 1 | .318 | 8 | – | 8 | – | 3 | .500 |
| Cincinnati ‍‍‍ | 2 | – | 6 | – | 3 | .318 | 6 | – | 9 | – | 4 | .421 |
| UCF ‍‍‍ | 1 | – | 5 | – | 4 | .300 | 3 | – | 6 | – | 6 | .400 |
| Iowa State ‍‍‍ | 1 | – | 5 | – | 4 | .300 | 3 | – | 9 | – | 6 | .333 |
| Houston ‍‍‍ | 1 | – | 10 | – | 0 | .091 | 4 | – | 12 | – | 1 | .265 |
| Kansas State ‍‍‍ | 0 | – | 9 | – | 2 | .091 | 3 | – | 12 | – | 3 | .250 |
† – Conference champion ‡ – 2024 Big 12 Tournament champion y – Invited to the NCAA Tournament; As of December 10, 2024; Rankings from United Soccer Coaches Poll; Source: The Big 12 Conference

The 2024 Big 12 Conference women's soccer tournament is the postseason women's soccer tournament for the Big 12 Conference held from October 30 to November 9, 2024. The conference announced the 11-match tournament would be held at CPKC Stadium in Kansas City, Missouri for the 2024 and 2025 season. It also would expand to twelve teams with the addition of Arizona, Arizona State, Colorado and Utah.

The 12-team single-elimination tournament will consist of the top four seeds receiving a bye into the quarterfinals and seeds five through twelve playing in a bracket style tournament.

== Seeding ==
The top twelve teams in regular season play qualified for the tournament. Tiebreaker will be used to determine seeds. The top four teams will receive a bye.

Three tiebreakers was used to determine the 6th and 7th seeds, the 10th and 11th seed and the 12th and final seed. Kansas defeated Arizona Head-to-head to clinch the 6 seed. Baylor defeated Arizona State Head-to-head to clinch the 10 seed. Due to the outcome of the Baylor vs. Iowa State game, Cincinnati clinched the 12th spot in this year's tournament.

| Seed | School | Conference Record | Points |
|---|---|---|---|
| 1 | TCU | 9–0–2 | 29 |
| 2 | Texas Tech | 8–1–2 | 27 |
| 3 | West Virginia | 8–2–1 | 25 |
| 4 | BYU | 6–2–3 | 21 |
| 5 | Oklahoma State | 6–3–2 | 20 |
| 6 | Kansas | 6–4–1 | 19 |
| 7 | Arizona | 6–4–1 | 19 |
| 8 | Utah | 5–3–3 | 18 |
| 9 | Colorado | 4–2–5 | 17 |
| 10 | Baylor | 2–5–4 | 10 |
| 11 | Arizona State | 3–7–1 | 10 |
| 12 | Cincinnati | 2–6–3 | 9 |

== Bracket ==
First round Wednesday, October 30
8 | Utah | 1
9 | Colorado | 2
5 | Oklahoma State | 3
12 | Cincinnati | 2
7 | Arizona | 1
10 | Baylor | 2
6 | Kansas | 2
11 | Arizona State | 1

Quarterfinals; Saturday, November 2
1 | TCU | 3
9 | Colorado | 1
4 | BYU | 5
5 | Oklahoma State | 0
2 | Texas Tech | 2
10 | Baylor | 1
3 | West Virginia | 0
6 | Kansas | 1

Semifinals; Wednesday, November 6
1 | TCU | 2
4 | BYU | 1
2 | Texas Tech | 1
6 | Kansas | 2

Championship; Saturday, November 9
1 | TCU | 0
6 | Kansas | 1

* denotes overtime period

== Schedule ==
=== 1st Round ===
| October 30, 2024 | No. 5 Oklahoma State | 3–2 | No. 12 Cincinnati | Kansas City, MO |
| 9:00 a.m. | Team (yellow card) 66'; Reganne Morris 77'; Xcaret Pineda 86'; Alex Morris 88' | Report | 51' Rylee Felton; 66' Jada Arthurs | Stadium: CPKC Stadium; Attendance: NA; Referee: Travis Haight; Assistant referees: Melissa Black; Will Aten; Fourth official: Matt Thompson |

| October 30, 2024 | No. 8 Utah | 1–2 | No. 9 Colorado | Kansas City, MO |
| 11:45 a.m. | Katie Callaway 23'; Kasey Wardle (yellow card) 72'; Bella Woods (yellow card) 74' | Report | 72' Hope Leyba; 85' Ava Priest | Stadium: CPKC Stadium; Attendance: NA; Referee: Elvis Osmanovic; Assistant referees: Chana Forstall; Joe Maht; Fourth official: Austin Saini |

| October 30, 2024 | No. 7 Arizona | 1–2 | No. 10 Baylor | Kansas City, MO |
| 2:30 p.m. | Narissa Fults 23'; Aranda Hurge (red card) 82' | Report | 9' Callie Conrad; (yellow card) 43' Ashley Merrill; 75' Caroline Staubach; (yellow card) 82' Tyler Isgrig | Stadium: CPKC Stadium; Attendance: NA; Referee: Matt Thompson; Assistant referees: Will Aten; Melissa Beck; Fourth official: Elvis Osmanovic |

| October 30, 2024 | No. 6 Kansas | 2–1 | No. 11 Arizona State | Kansas City, MO |
| 5:15 p.m. | Lexi Watts 16'; Caroline Castans 57' | Report | 58' Kierra Blundell | Stadium: CPKC Stadium; Attendance: NA; Referee: Austin Saini; Assistant referees: Joe Macht; Chana Forstall; Fourth official: Travis Haight |

=== Quarterfinals ===
| November 2, 2024 | No. 4 BYU | 5–0 | No. 5 Oklahoma State | Kansas City, MO |
| 9:00 a.m. | Mika Krommenhoek 1', 4'; Allie Fryer 21', 28'; Mackenzee Vance 47' | Report | (yellow card) 8' Logan Heausler | Stadium: CPKC Stadium; Attendance: NA; Referee: Corey Rockwell; Assistant referees: Sam Bilbo; Laura Chambers; Fourth official: Ben Meyer |

| November 2, 2024 | No. 1 TCU | 3–1 | No. 9 Colorado | Kansas City, MO |
| 11:45 a.m. | Camryn Lancaster 30'; Seven Castain 73'; Caroline Kelly 80' | Report | 1' Hope Leyba; (yellow card) 34' Greer Maguire | Stadium: CPKC Stadium; Attendance: NA; Referee: Servando Berna; Assistant referees: Jay Norris; Josh Ell; Fourth official: Chris Ruska |

| November 2, 2024 | No. 2 Texas Tech | 2–1 | No. 10 Baylor | Kansas City, MO |
| 2:30 p.m. | Taylor Zdrojewski 9'; Storie Sexton 45' | Report | 1' Tyler Isgrig; (yellow card) 65' Marissa Gray | Stadium: CPKC Stadium; Attendance: NA; Referee: Ben Meyer; Assistant referees: Laura Chambers; Sam Bilbo; Fourth official: Corey Rockwell |

| November 2, 2024 | No. 3 West Virginia | 0–1 | No. 6 Kansas | Kansas City, MO |
| 5:15 p.m. | Lexi Schöppl (yellow card) 59'; Taylor White (yellow card) 72' | Report | 100' Lexi White | Stadium: CPKC Stadium; Attendance: NA; Referee: Chris Ruska; Assistant referees: Josh Ell; Jay Norris; Fourth official: Servando Berna |

=== Semifinals ===
| November 6, 2024 | No. 4 BYU | 1–2 | No. 1 TCU | Kansas City, MO |
| 4:30 p.m. | Avery Frischknecht (yellow card) 14'; Mackenzee Vance 19'; Ella Rustand (yellow card) 61'; Presley Freeman (yellow card) 81' | Report | 39' Caroline Kelly; 40' Seven Castain; (yellow card) 55' Bella Diorio | Stadium: CPKC Stadium; Attendance: NA; Referee: Amin Hadzic; Assistant referees: Carlos Morales; Emily Gomez; Fourth official: Drew Klemp |

| November 6, 2024 | No. 2 Texas Tech | 1–2 | No. 6 Kansas | Kansas City, MO |
| 7:00 p.m. | Molly Skurcenski (yellow card) 18'; Peyton Parsons (yellow card) 38'; Ashleigh Williams 63'; Team (yellow card) 70' | Report | 40' Raena Knust; 49' Olivia Page; (yellow card) 55' Olivia Page | Stadium: CPKC Stadium; Attendance: NA; Referee: Brandon Gardner; Assistant referees: Kate Wasiak; Josh Mills; Fourth official: Kyle Armstrong |

=== Final ===
| November 9, 2024 | No. 1 TCU | 0–1 | No. 6 Kansas | Kansas City, MO |
| 7:00 p.m. | | Report | (yellow card) 12' Caroline Castans; (yellow card) 55' Mackenzie Boeve; 65' (pen.) Makayla Merlo | Stadium: CPKC Stadium; Referee: Dimitar Chavdarov; Assistant referees: Tiffini Turpin; Albert Escovar; Fourth official: Velimir Stefanovic |

== Statistics ==
=== Goalscorers ===
There were 34 goals scored in 11 matches, for an average of 3.09 goals per match (as of November 9, 2024).

2 goals

- Allie Fryer – BYU
- Mika Krommenhoek – BYU
- Mackenzee Vance – BYU
- Hope Leyba – Colorado
- Lexi Watts – Kansas
- Seven Castain – TCU
- Caroline Kelly – TCU

1 goal

- Narissa Fults – Arizona
- Kierra Blundell – Arizona State
- Callie Conrad – Baylor
- Tyler Isgrig – Baylor
- Carolina Staubach – Baylor
- Jada Arthurs – Cincinnati
- Rylee Felton – Cincinnati
- Ava Priest – Colorado
- Caroline Castans – Kansas
- Raena Knust – Kansas
- Makayla Merlo – Kansas
- Olivia Page – Kansas
- Reganne Morris – Oklahoma State
- Xcaret Pineda – Oklahoma State
- Alex Morris – Oklahoma State
- Camryn Lancaster – TCU
- Storie Sexton – Texas Tech
- Ashleigh Williams – Texas Tech
- Taylor Zdrojewski – Texas Tech
- Katie Callaway – Utah

== All-Tournament team ==
| Position | Player | Team |
|---|---|---|
| GK | Sophie Dawe^ | Kansas |
| DF | Caroline Castans | Kansas |
| DF | Olivia Page | Kansas |
| DF | Macy Blackburn | Texas Tech |
| MF | Allie Fryer | BYU |
| MF | Mackenzee Vance | BYU |
| MF | Morgan Brown | TCU |
| MF | Oli Peña | TCU |
| FW | Lexi Watts* | Kansas |
| FW | Seven Castain | TCU |
| FW | Caroline Kelly | TCU |

* Offensive MVP
^ Defensive MVP
