= Olivia Page (American soccer) =

American soccer player

- Page with Florida State in 2026

Personal information
- Height: 5 ft 10 in (1.78 m)
- Position: Center back

Team information
- Current team: Florida State Seminoles

Youth career
- KC Fusion

College career
Years	Team	Apps	(Gls)
2023–2025	Kansas Jayhawks	66	(3)
2026–	Florida State Seminoles	0	(0)

Olivia Page is an American college soccer player who plays as a center back for the Florida State Seminoles. She previously played for the Kansas Jayhawks.

== Early life ==
Page grew up in Shawnee, Kansas, one of three daughters born to Michael and Tammie Page. Her father played college football at Kansas; her mother played college softball at Kansas City; and one of her sisters played college soccer at Kansas City. She began playing soccer at age three. She led Mill Valley High School to the KSHSAA 6A state championship in her senior year in 2023, scoring a header in the state final and earning all-state honors that year. She played club soccer for KC Fusion. She committed to play college soccer for Kansas over offers from Kansas City, Kansas State, Nebraska, Omaha, and Purdue.

== College career ==
Paige gained immediate playing time for the Kansas Jayhawks as a freshman in 2023, contributing mainly at center back but also able to play wide. She scored her first college goal against Oklahoma and appeared in all 18 games that season, starting the last 8. She played in all 23 games, making 12 starts, as a sophomore in 2024, scoring a goal against Texas Tech as the Jayhawks won the Big 12 Conference tournament. In her junior year in 2025, she started all 25 games and helped the Jayhawks reach the NCAA tournament round of 16 for the third time in program history. After three years at Kansas, she transferred to the defending national champion Florida State Seminoles in the spring of 2026.

== Honors and awards ==
Kansas Jayhawks

- Big 12 tournament: 2024

Individual

- Big 12 tournament all-tournament team: 2024
