= Lisa Zimmermann =

Lisa Zimmermann may refer to:

- Lisa Zimmermann (skier) (born 1996), German freestyle skier
- Lisa Zimmermann (gymnast) (born 2003), German artistic gymnast
- Lisa Cole Zimmerman (born 1969), American soccer player
