= Lexi Watts =

American soccer player

Personal information
- Full name: Lexington Marie Watts
- Place of birth: Clovis, California, United States
- Height: 5 ft 7 in (1.70 m)
- Position: Forward

College career
Years	Team	Apps	(Gls)
2022–2025	Kansas Jayhawks	85	(28)

Lexington Marie Watts is an American soccer player who plays as a forward. She played college soccer for the Kansas Jayhawks, earning fourth-team All-American honors in 2025.

== Early life ==
Watts was born in Clovis, California, and named after the city's Lexington Avenue. Her family moved to Lenexa, Kansas, when she was five. She began playing soccer when she was three and was coached by her father. She committed to play college soccer for Kansas during her freshman year at St. James Academy, where she played soccer, basketball, and track. She was named first-team all-state in soccer as a senior in 2022. She played club soccer for KC Fusion and Sporting Blue Valley, earning ECNL all-conference honors with the latter.

== College career ==
Watts scored 6 goals in 20 games for the Kansas Jayhawks as a freshman in 2022, earning Big 12 Conference all-freshman honors. She scored 7 goals in 18 games in her sophomore season in 2023. She injured her hip the following spring but recovered by the start of her junior season. Under new head coach Nate Lie, she helped lead the Jayhawks to their second Big 12 tournament title and was named the tournament's Offensive MVP as Kansas qualified for their first NCAA tournament since 2019. She finished her junior season with 9 goals in 23 games and was named first-team All-Big 12. In her senior year in 2025, she scored a career-high 11 goals in 24 games, repeating as first-team All-Big 12 and earning fourth-team All-American honors. She helped the Jayhawks to the Big 12 tournament final and the NCAA tournament round of 16.

== Personal life ==
Watts is the daughter of Wendy and Rian Watts. Her parents both played college sports at Baker University, with her mother in soccer, basketball, and track, and her father in soccer. Her younger sister, Sydney, plays college soccer for Vanderbilt.

== Honors and awards ==
Kansas Jayhawks

- Big 12 Conference tournament: 2024

Individual

- Fourth-team All-American: 2025
- First-team All-Big 12: 2024, 2025
- Big 12 all-freshman team: 2022
- Big 12 tournament Offensive MVP: 2024
