= Eleanor Dale =

English footballer (born 2002)

Personal information
- Full name: Eleanor Grace Dale
- Date of birth: 9 February 2002 (age 24)
- Place of birth: Billingham, Durham, England
- Height: 1.70 m (5 ft 7 in)
- Position: Striker

Team information
- Current team: Tampa Bay Sun
- Number: 10

College career
Years	Team	Apps	(Gls)
2020–2023	Nebraska Cornhuskers	65	(44)

Senior career*
Years	Team	Apps	(Gls)
2017–2020	Middlesbrough	29	(16)
2020	Durham	3	(1)
2024	Everton	6	(0)
2024–2026	Sunderland	31	(12)
2026–	Tampa Bay Sun	3	(1)

International career^{‡}
2019	England U17	7	(4)
- * Club domestic league appearances and goals as of 00:55, 7 November 2026 (UTC) ‡ National team caps and goals as of 23:12, 5 May 2019 (UTC)

Eleanor Grace Dale (born 9 February 2002) is an English professional footballer who plays as a striker for USL Super League club Tampa Bay Sun. She played college soccer for the Nebraska Cornhuskers, earning first-team All-American honors after leading the nation in goals in 2023. She also previously played for Middlesbrough, Durham, Everton, and Sunderland.

== Early life ==
Dale is from Billingham, Durham and attended the local Northfield School.

== Club career ==
Dale made her debut for Middlesbrough in the Northern Premier League on 25 February 2018, as a substitute in a 4–1 win against Derby County. She scored her first goal for the club on 11 March, in a 4–1 win against Nottingham Forest.

Dale began her senior career at Women's Championship club Durham, signing for the club on January 4, 2020. She scoring her debut goal for Durham against Blackburn Rovers on 2 February.

Dale played four seasons of college soccer for the Nebraska Cornhuskers in the United States. In her senior year in 2023, she led the country with 28 goals, helping Nebraska win the Big Ten Conference regular season title, and was recognized as first-team All-American, first-team All-Big Ten, and the Big Ten Forward of the Year.

On 1 February 2024 Dale signed for Women's Super League club Everton. She made six appearances for club during the 2023–24 season.

On 4 July 2024, she then signed for Sunderland, to return to playing in the Women's Championship.

On 11 January 2025, she scored four goals in the 7–1 win over National League side Exeter City in the 2024–25 FA Cup fourth round.

On 11 August 2026, Dale returned to the United States, signing with USL Super League club Tampa Bay Sun.

== International career ==
Dale has represented England internationally at under-17 and under-18 youth level. Dale made her debut for the under-23 team in a 0–0 draw against Spain on 16 February 2023. She was described as "one of England’s rising stars, having... made her home country’s U23 team".

== Honours ==
Individual

- NCAA Division I First-Team All-American: 2023
- Big Ten Conference Forward of the Year: 2023
