= Kansas Jayhawks women's soccer =

American college soccer team

- Founded: 1995; 31 years ago
- University: University of Kansas
- Athletic director: Travis Goff
- Head coach: Nate Lie (3rd season)
- Conference: Big 12
- Location: Lawrence, Kansas, US
- Stadium: Rock Chalk Park (capacity: 2,500)
- Nickname: Jayhawks
- Colors: Crimson and blue

NCAA tournament Round of 16
- 2003, 2019, 2025

NCAA tournament Round of 32
- 2003, 2004, 2008, 2016, 2018, 2025

NCAA tournament appearances
- 2001, 2003, 2004, 2008, 2011, 2014, 2016, 2018, 2019, 2024, 2025, 2026

Conference tournament championships
- 2019, 2024

Conference regular season championships
- 2004

The Kansas Jayhawks women's soccer team represents University of Kansas in the Big 12 Conference of NCAA Division I college soccer. Before the 1995 season, the team participated as a club sport. The team is coached by Nate Lie and has made the NCAA Tournament 11 times. The team plays its home games at Rock Chalk Park.

== History ==
Kansas women's soccer began as a student club sport in 1980 before being elevated to NCAA Division I varsity status in 1995 with a 6-12 record in its inaugural year. The Jayhawks competed as an independent during their inaugural varsity season before becoming a founding member of the Big 12 Conference in 1996. In 2004, Kansas captured its first and only Big 12 regular-season championship and advanced to the NCAA Tournament Sweet 16 for the first time in program history. The Jayhawks later won Big 12 Tournament championships in 2019 and 2024. As of 2025, Kansas has reached the Sweet 16 three times, marking the deepest NCAA Tournament runs in program history.

The Jayhawks have gone to the NCAA tournament in 2001, 2003, 2004, 2008, 2011, 2014, 2016, 2018, 2019, 2024, and 2025.

== Results by season ==
Season Results
Year	Coach	Overall record	Conference record	Conference standing	Postseason
(Independent) (1995–1996)
1995	Lori Walker	6–12–0	–	–	–
(Big 12 Conference) (1996–2010)
1996	Lori Walker	7–11–1	3–5–1	7th	–
1997	Dan Magner	7–12–1	2–8–0	10th	–
1998	Dan Magner	5–13–1	1–8–1	11th	–
1999	Mark Francis	8–10–1	3–6–1	9th	–
2000	Mark Francis	7–11–2	3–6–1	T–8th	–
2001	Mark Francis	13–7–0	7–3–0	4th	NCAA First Round
2002	Mark Francis	11–7–2	4–5–1	6th	–
2003	Mark Francis	18–6–1	6–3–1	3rd	NCAA Round of 16
2004	Mark Francis	18–5–0	8–2–0	1st	NCAA Round of 32
2005	Mark Francis	11–7–2	6–3–1	T–2nd	–
2006	Mark Francis	11–7–1	6–4–0	4th	–
2007	Mark Francis	7–10–4	5–2–3	T–3rd	–
2008	Mark Francis	13–8–2	4–5–1	7th	NCAA Round of 32
2009	Mark Francis	12–8–2	4–6–0	T–7th	–
2010	Mark Francis	6–13–0	1–9–0	11th	–
2011	Mark Francis	11–9–1	3–5–0	T–6th	NCAA First Round
2012	Mark Francis	10–8–2	3–5–0	6th	–
2013	Mark Francis	7–11–2	2–5–1	8th	–
2014	Mark Francis	15–6–0	5–3–0	12th	NCAA First Round
2015	Mark Francis	10–9–2	3–4–1	6th	–
2016	Mark Francis	11–6–4	5–1–2	2nd	NCAA Round of 32
2017	Mark Francis	8–9–3	3–5–1	6th	–
2018	Mark Francis	12–6–3	5–4–0	6th	NCAA Round of 32
2019	Mark Francis	17–5–3	4–2–3	5th	Big 12 Conference Tournament Champions; NCAA Round of 16
2020	Mark Francis	6–4–3	5–3–1	4th	–
2021	Mark Francis	7–11–1	2–7–0	9th	–
2022	Mark Francis	9–9–2	2–5–2	7th	–
2023	Mark Francis	4–8–6	1–7–2	13th	–
2024	Nate Lie	13–6–4	6–4–1	6th	Big 12 Conference Tournament Champions; NCAA First Round
2025	Nate Lie	16–6–3	6–4–1	7th	NCAA Round of 16
Totals: 31 Years – 4 Coaches		316-260-59 (.544)		3 Conference championships	15 Postseason appearances

== Current roster ==
As of November 2026

Note: Flags indicate national team as defined under FIFA eligibility rules; some limited exceptions apply. Players may hold more than one non-FIFA nationality.

No.	Pos.	Nation	Player
00	GK	USA	Sophie Dawe
1	GK	USA	Brooklyn Smith
4	MF	USA	Emma Frey
5	MF	USA	Olivia Kaiser
6	MF	USA	Chloe Trotter
7	FW	USA	Faith Johnston
8	MF	USA	Kate Langfelder
9	FW	USA	Hannah Palmer
10	FW	USA	Jordan Rowan
11	DF	USA	Jordan Fjelstad
12	MF	USA	Marit McLaughlin
13	DF	USA	Jennah Black
14	MF	USA	Lydia Viets
15	DF	USA	Caroline Castans
16	MF	USA	Olivia Joyce
17	MF	USA	Emily Tobin

No.	Pos.	Nation	Player
18	FW	USA	Gabby Thompson
19	MF	USA	Mary Sola
20	MF	USA	Sophia Mir
21	MF	USA	Sydni Fink
22	GK	USA	Clara Roche
23	FW	USA	Jocelyn Herrema
25	DF	USA	Gianna Weiner
27	MF	USA	London De Fini
28	FW	USA	Norah Jacomen
32	DF	USA	Bella Salina
33	DF	USA	Maya Mathis
34	MF	USA	Jillian Gregorski
38	FW	USA	Jordyn Huggins
47	DF	USA	Sophia Canepa
99	MF	USA	Livvy Moore

== Awards ==
Player	Award	Season
Emily Cressy	Big 12 Rookie of the Year	2008
Kayla Morrison	Big 12 Defender of the Year	2017
Addisyn Merrick	Big 12 Defender of the Year	2019
Caroline Castans	Big 12 Co-Scholar-Athlete of the Year	2025

Coach	Award	Season
Mark Francis	Big 12 Coach of the Year	2004

=== All-Big 12 Honors ===
Player	First team All-Big 12
Meghan Miller	2003
Caroline Smith	2003
Holly Gault	2004
Amy Geha	2004
Meghan Miller	2004
Caroline Smith	2004
Holly Gault	2005
Caroline Smith	2005
Monica Dolinsky	2008
Ingrid Vidal	2011
Whitney Berr	2012
Liana Salazar	2013
Caroline Van Slambrouck	2014
Liana Salazar	2014
Ashley Williams	2014
Liana Salazar	2015
Grace Hagan	2016
Grace Hagan	2018
Katie McClure	2019
Addisyn Merrick	2019
Caroline Castans	2024
Lexi Watts	2025
Caroline Castans	2025
Lexi Watts	2024

Player	Second team All-Big 12
Pardis Brown	2000
Pardis Brown	2001
Hilla Rantala	2001
Holly Gault	2003
Afton Sauer	2004
Rachel Gilfillan	2004
Jessica Bush	2006
Holly Gault	2006
Missy Geha	2006
Jenny Murtaugh	2006
Nicole Cauzillo	2007
Monica Dolinsky	2009
Estelle Johnson	2009
Whitney Berry	2009
Whitney Berry	2010
Whitney Berry	2011
Liana Salazar	2011
Jamie Fletcher	2012
Caroline Kastor	2012
Caroline Kastor	2013
Jamie Fletcher	2014
Tayler Estrada	2016
Hanna Kallmaier	2016
Kayla Morrison	2016
Grace Hagan	2017
Kayla Morrison	2017
Katie McClure	2018
Ceri Holland	2019
Ceri Holland	2020
Kate Langfelder	2025
Jillian Gregorski	2025

Note

- ‡ indicates player was Big 12 Newcomer of the Year
- † indicates player was Big 12 Freshman of the Year

All-Big 12 All-Newcomer/Freshman Honors

Player	Big 12 All-Newcomer/Freshman Team
Pardis Brown	2000
Meghan Miller	2001
Monica Brothers	2001
Caroline Smith	2002
Holly Gault	2003
Afton Sauer	2004
Jessica Bush	2005
Missy Geha	2005
Monica Dolinsky	2006
Estelle Johnson	2006
Katie Williams	2007
Emily Cressy †	2008
Whitney Berry	2009
Liana Salazar	2011
Ingrid Vidal	2011
Amy Barczuk	2009
Ashley Williams	2012
Aurélie Gagnet	2013
Kayla Morrison	2014
Parker Roberts	2015
Katie McClure	2016
Addisyn Merrick	2016
Ceri Holland	2017
Sarah Peters	2018
Moira Kelley	2020
Raena Childers	2021
Lexi Watts	2022
Jillian Gregorski	2024

== Individual Records ==
Career Goals
Player	Years	Goals
Caroline Smith	2002–05	51
Katie McClure	2016–19	39
Liana Salazar	2011–15	28
Lexi Watts	2022–25	28
Caroline Kastor	2010-13	26
Rachel Gilfillan	2001-04	26

Season Goals
Player	Year	Goals
Caroline Smith	2003	19
Katie McClure	2019	17
Liana Salazar	2014	13
Emily Cressy	2009	12
Caroline Smith	2002	12

Career Assists
Player	Years	Assists
Whitney Berry	2009–12	32
Monica Dolinsky	2006–09	30
Caroline Smith	2002-05	24
Jessica Bush	2005–08	21
Caroline Castans	2023–Present	21

Season Assists
Player	Year	Assists
Caroline Castans	2025	15
Whitney Berry	2011	13
Hilla Rantala	2001	12
Monica Dolinsky	2009	10
Monica Dolinsky	2008	10
Caroline Smith	2004	10

Career Points
Player	Years	Points
Caroline Smith	2002–05	126
Katie McClure	2016–19	94
Whitney Berry	2009–12	78
Monica Dolinsky	2006-09	76
Lexi Watts	2022–25	70

Season Points
Player	Year	Points
Katie McClure	2019	43
Caroline Smith	2003	41
Caroline Smith	2004	32
Hilla Rantala	2001	32
Liana Salazar	2014	30

Career Saves
Player	Years	Saves
Jen Fecke	1996–98	375
Meghan Miller	2001–04	362
Kaitlyn Stroud	2010–14	281
Kat Liebetrau	2009-12	228
Julie Hanley	2005–09	228

Season Saves
Player	Year	Saves
Jen Fecke	1996	150
Jen Fecke	1997	147
Betsy Pollard	1999	125
Kat Liebetrau	2010	113
Meghan Miller	2003	111
