= Mesa Community College =

Community college in Mesa, Arizona, US

- Other name: MCC
- Type: Public community college
- Established: 1965; 61 years ago
- Parent institution: Maricopa County Community College District
- Accreditation: Higher Learning Commission
- President: Richard Daniel Ph.D.
- Students: 23,156 (fall 2026)
- Location: Mesa, Arizona, U.S. 33°23′27″N 111°52′18″W
- Campus: Urban
- Colors: Royal blue & red
- Nickname: Thunderbirds
- Sporting affiliations: Arizona Community College Athletic Conference; National Junior College Athletic Association
- Website: www.mesacc.edu

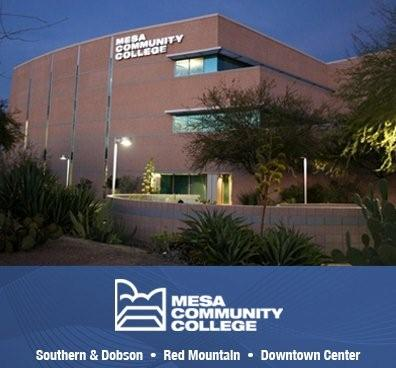
MCC Paul A. Elsner Library

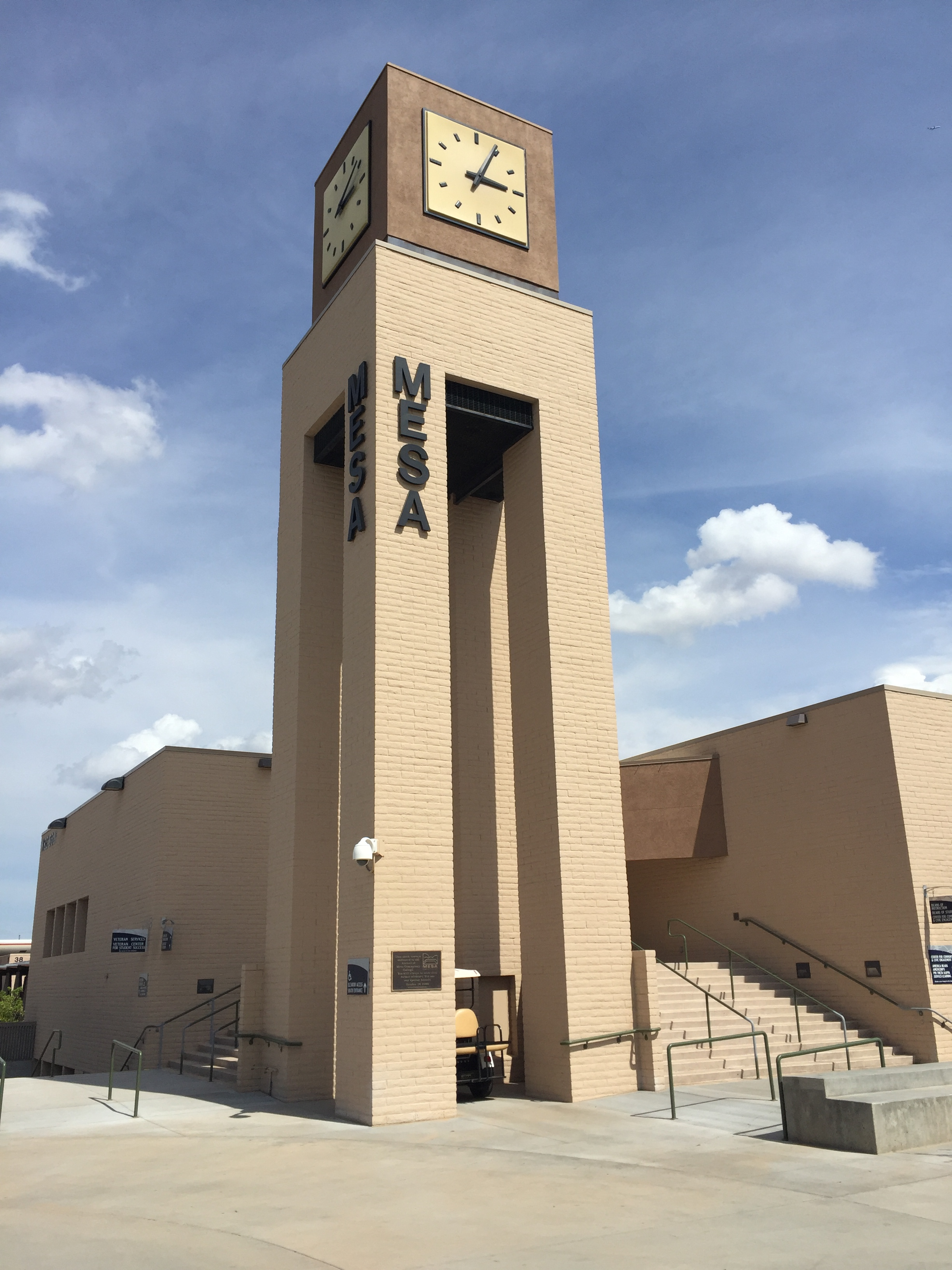
MCC Clock Tower

Mesa Community College (MCC) is a public community college in Mesa, Arizona. It is the largest of the 10 community colleges in the Maricopa County Community College District, the largest community college district in the United States in terms of enrollment.

== History ==
MCC was launched by Mart Godinez in 1963 as an extension branch of Phoenix College and was located at 809 W. Main Street in Mesa. There were 330 students registered for classes the first semester at Mesa Extension on September 11, 1963. John Riggs was appointed as the first president. Mesa students voted Hokams as the nickname for their athletic teams in 1964. Capital funds from the bond election in 1964 enabled Mesa Community College to purchase 120 acres, with an option to purchase an adjoining 40 acres, for the new campus at Dobson and Southern Roads in Mesa. The three building campus included a science building, student center and maintenance building. The buildings were designed by Mesa architects Horlbeck, Hickman & Associates and Tempe architect Kemper Goodwin, and built by Tibschraney Bros. Construction Company. In addition to the three permeate buildings portable buildings were used for the first several years, until the campus was able to expand.

On April 12, 1965, the Maricopa Junior College District Board named Mesa Community College and Glendale Community College as separate institutions from Phoenix College. Mesa Community College graduated its first class on its new campus in ceremonies May 29, 1968. The library and classroom building was completed in 1968. In 1969 Tibschraney Bros. completed construction of the campus with completion of the gymnasium, athletic fields, technology building, social science building, faculty office building and business education building. The music building was completed in 1970 followed by the nursing building in 1974. That same year, MCC's mascot changed from Hokam to Thunderbird, also at this time Helena Howe was appointed president. A liberal arts building was added in 1976. The Outback Theater was built in 1978 That same year Theo J. Heap became president of the college. In 1982 a health improvement center was built near the gymnasium. The technology building opened in 1984 and was designed by architects Hickman, Schafer & Truley, that same year Wallace A. Simpson became president. The east gymnasium was added in 1986. Bar code technology came to the library in 1987 as part of a new automation system. Bar codes were assigned to every item in the library's collection, and appeared on student ID cards for the first time. From 1986 to 1987 the Business/Psychology building, Social/Cultural Science building and testing center were built. In 1988 Larry K. Christianson became president. The Kirk Student Center was expanded in 1988 and a clock tower was added at the entrance in 1990. In 1999 the Paul A. Elsner Library a new larger library opened adjacent to the old, the old library building was subsequently remodeled and is now the academic support building. A new life science building was also added at this time.

Phase I construction began for Red Mountain Campus in 2000, which included four buildings: the Desert Willow Building (library & commons), Mesquite Building (student & administrative services), Palo Verde Building (classrooms & laboratories), and the Ironwood Building. (central plant). A groundbreaking ceremony was held in April, 2000.

In 2004 MCC was visited by then President George W. Bush who discussed his proposal for $250 Million federal grant for job training across the United States.

In 2008 Dr. Shouan Pan became the sixth president of MCC. A new physical science building was added to the main campus in 2008. This was followed by the enrollment center in 2015 and the art museum in 2016.

== Campus ==
The college has two comprehensive campuses to serve students.

- Southern and Dobson, in southwest Mesa, Arizona
- Red Mountain, in northeast Mesa

The Arizona Gakuen School (アリゾナ学園 Arizona Gakuen), a weekend supplementary Japanese school, holds its classes at the Mesa Community College Southern and Dobson campus. The school office is in Tempe.

== Organization and administration ==
August 2016, Sasan Poureetezadi was named interim president of Mesa Community College. On April 2, 2018, Richard Haney was named president. He assumed office on July 1, 2018. As of January 2020, Lori Berquam was named interim president. Lori Berquam was succeeded by Tammy Robinson July 1, 2022

== Academics ==
MCC offers more than 200 degrees, transfer, career and certificate programs. Areas of study include Agribusiness, Business, Bio Technology, Computer Science, Dental Hygiene, Electronics, Engineering, Fire Science, Mortuary Science, Nursing, Urban Horticulture and more. MCC is one of the largest transfer providers to ASU, while many programs prepare students for immediate entry to the job market. Traditional, online and hybrid courses provide flexibility for students. Additionally, MCC Community Education offers hundreds of non-credit classes providing opportunities for lifelong learning in the arts, technology, fitness and personal development for all age groups.

MCC is accredited by the Higher Learning Commission.

== Student life ==
=== Athletics ===
The college athletics teams are nicknamed the Thunderbirds.

== Notable people ==
- David Benedict, athletic director at UConn
- Carla Morrison, Indie-Pop guitarist and singer
- Marty Barrett (second baseman), professional baseball player
- Randy Bennett, college basketball coach
- Larvell Blanks, professional baseball player
- Hubie Brooks, professional baseball player
- Mike Brown, professional basketball coach
- Bryan Caldwell, professional football player
- Dave Collins, professional baseball player
- Ralph Dickenson, professional baseball player
- Dave Farnsworth, American politician and Republican member of the Arizona Senate
- Aaron D. Franklin, American electrical engineer and professor
- Rod Gilbreath, professional baseball player
- Rick Grapenthin, professional baseball player
- Shea Hillenbrand, professional baseball player
- Kyle Kingsbury, wrestler and football player; current mixed martial artist
- Albie Lopez, professional baseball player
- Marko Mitchell, professional football player
- Jim Otten, professional baseball player
- Bob Pate, professional baseball player
- Ken Phelps, professional baseball player
- Matt Salmon, former congressman
- Danny Sanchez, college soccer coach
- Greg Sparks, professional baseball player
- Clifford Starks, professional mixed martial artist
- Robin Wilson (musician), guitarist and singer with the Gin Blossoms
- Vance Wilson, professional baseball player

== Gallery ==
Southern & Dobson Campus

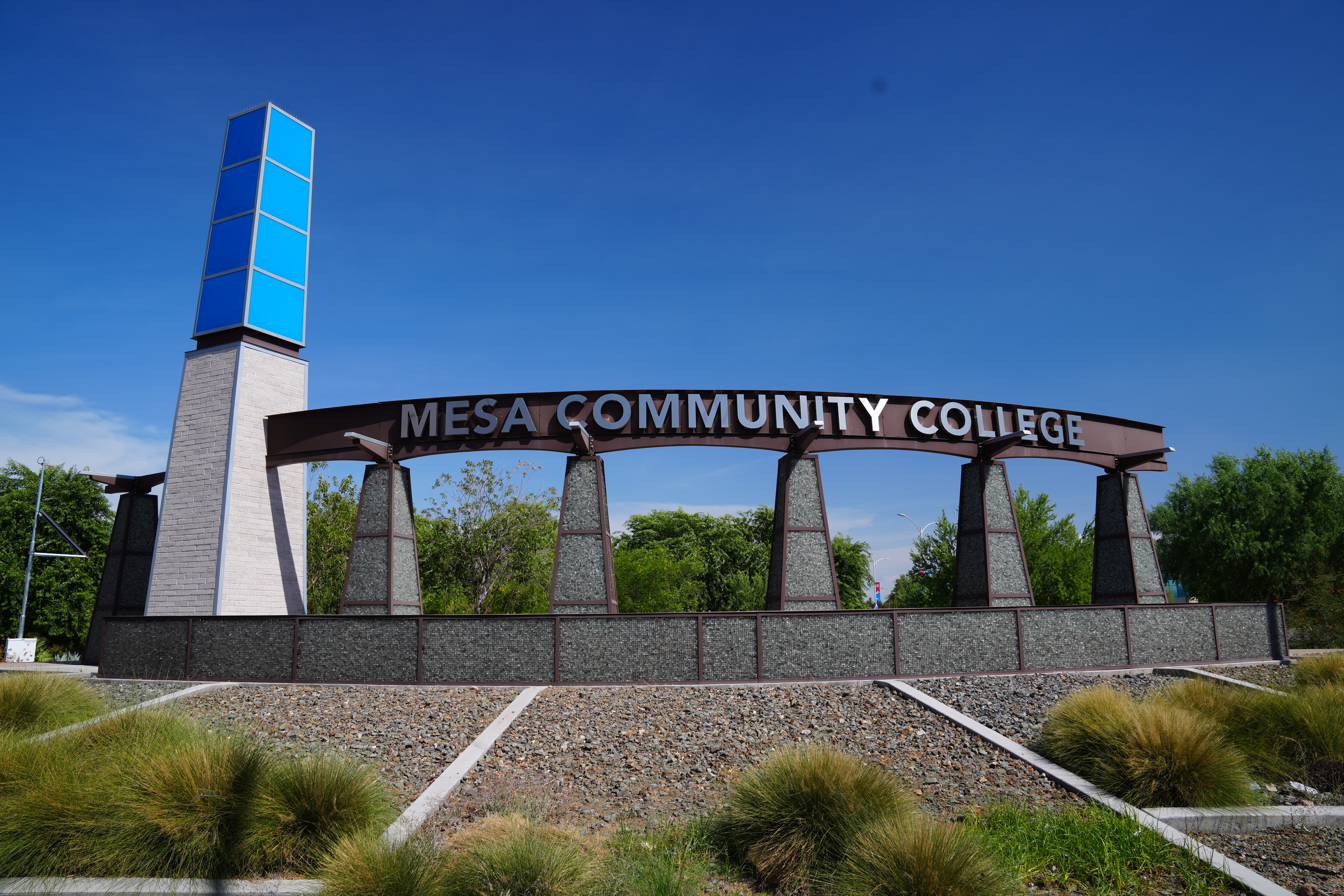
Mesa Community College

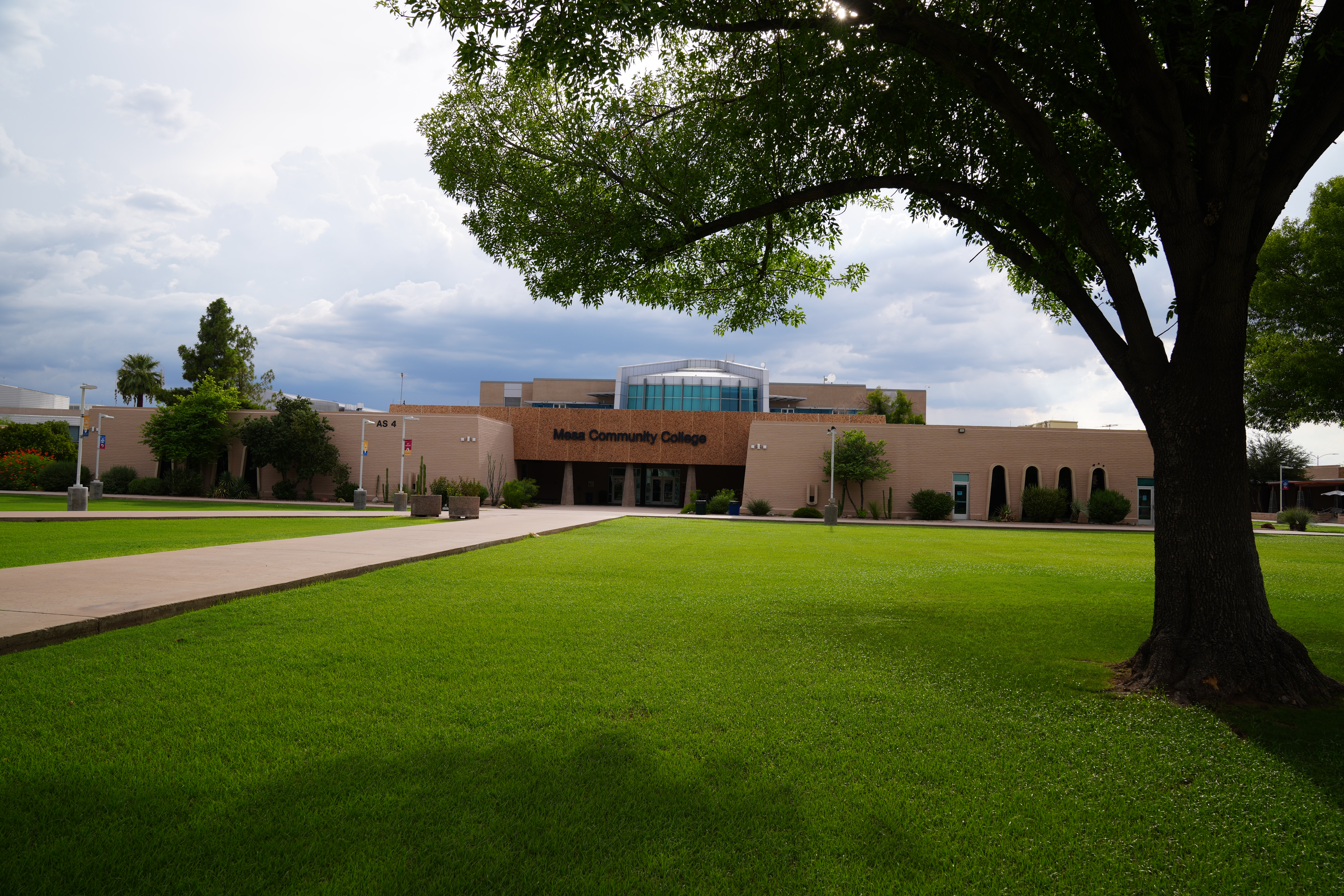
Mesa Community College

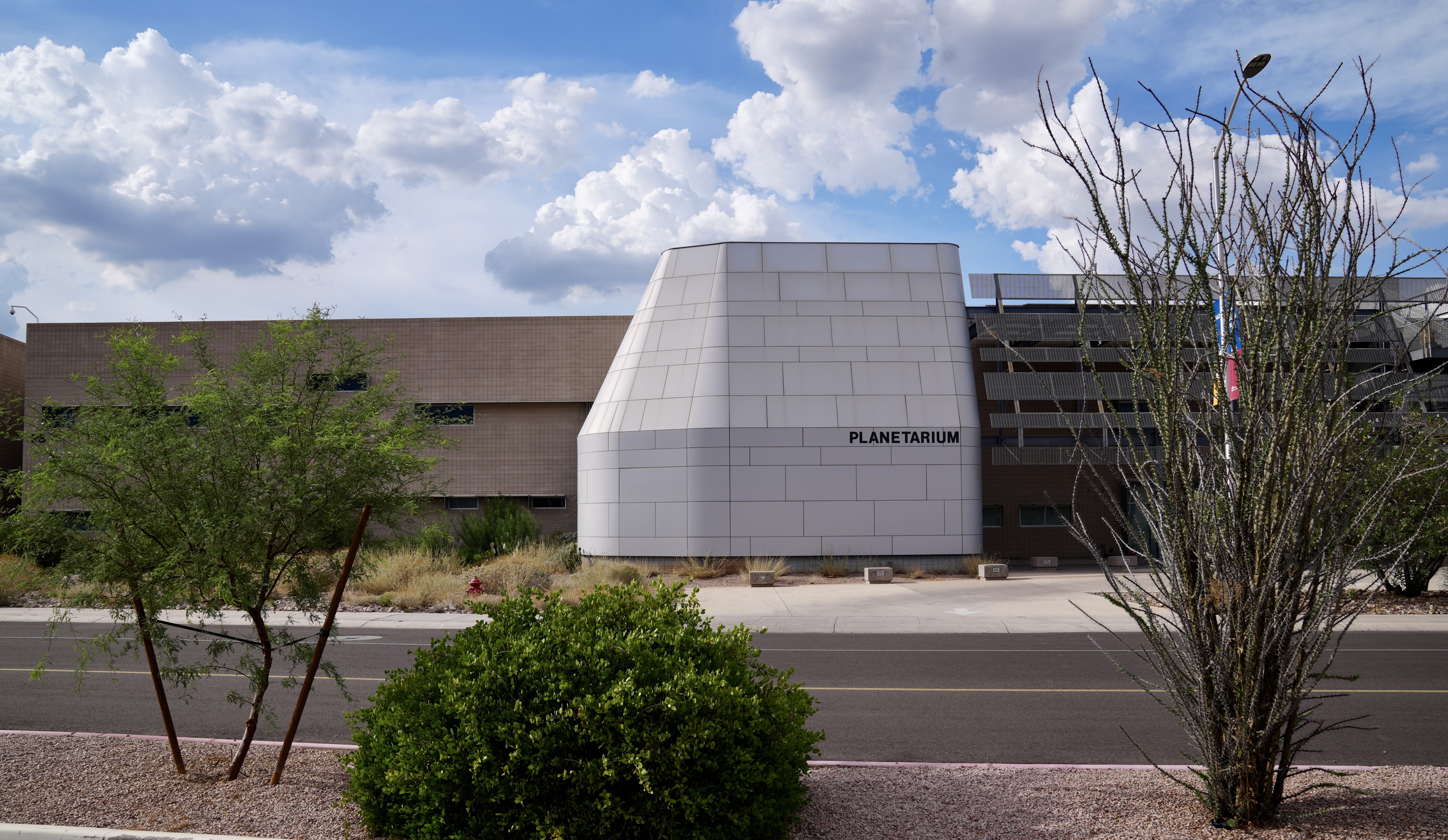
Mesa Community College Physical Science Building with Planetarium

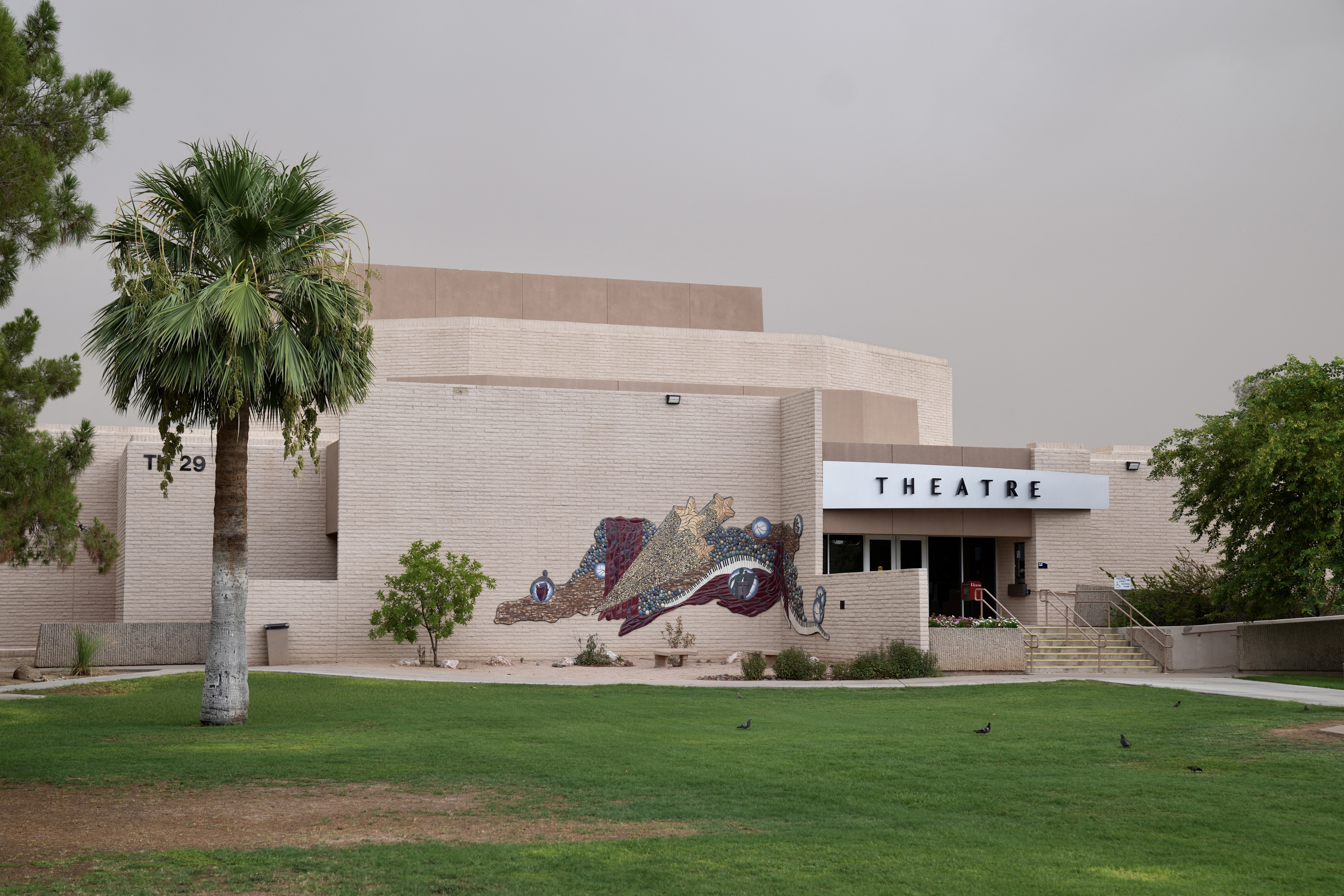
Mesa Community College Theatre

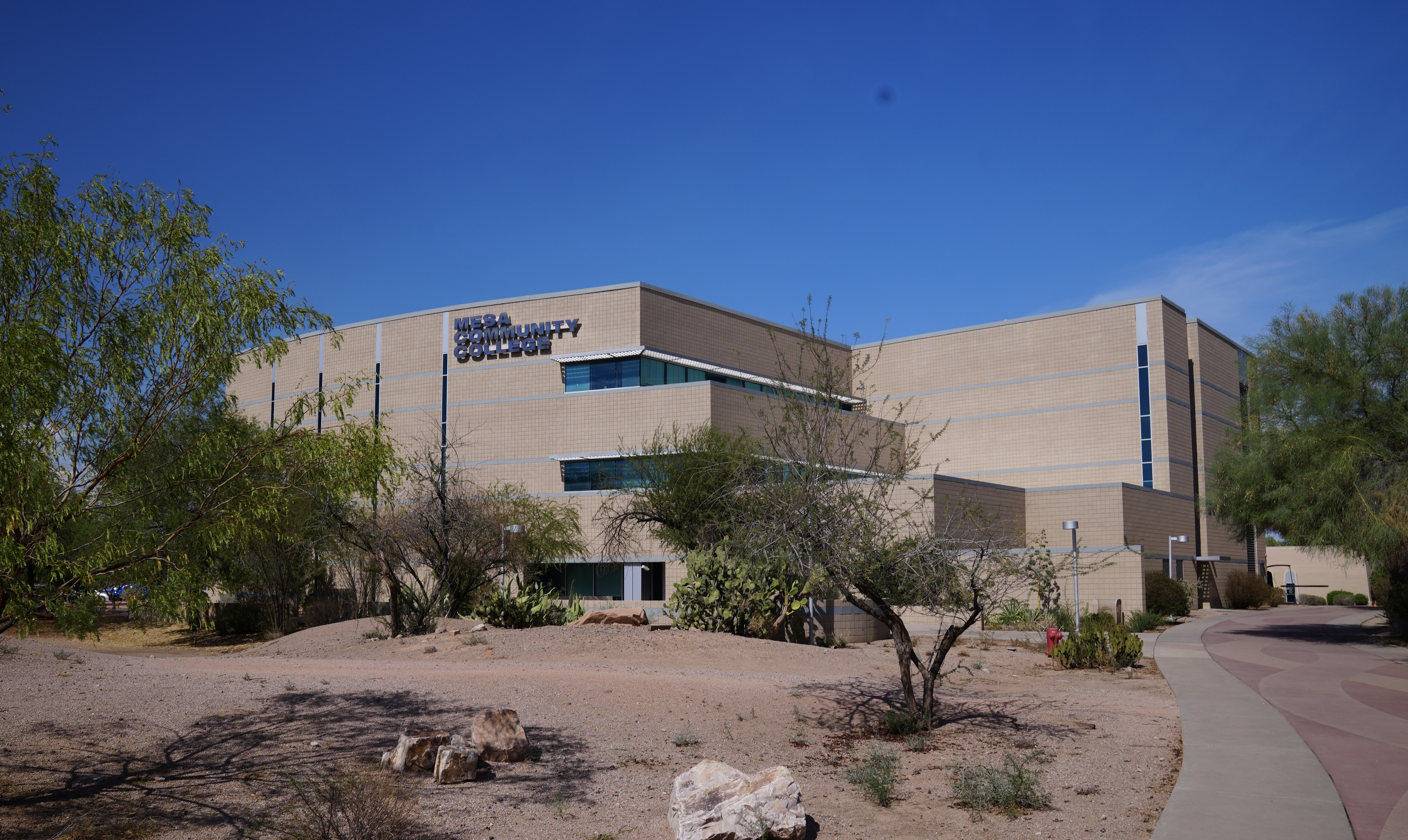
Mesa Community College, Paul A. Elsner Library

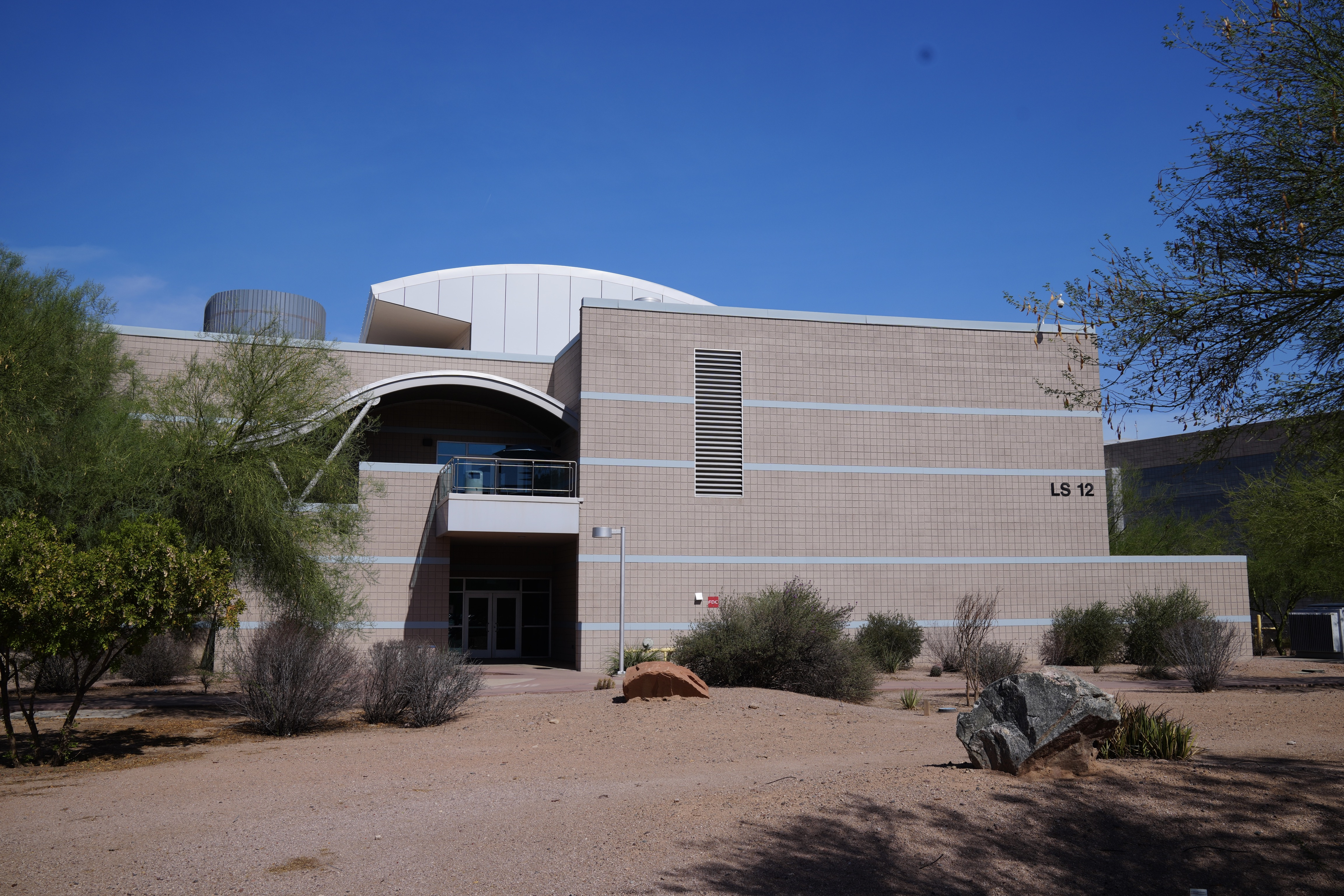
Mesa Community College, Life Sciences Building

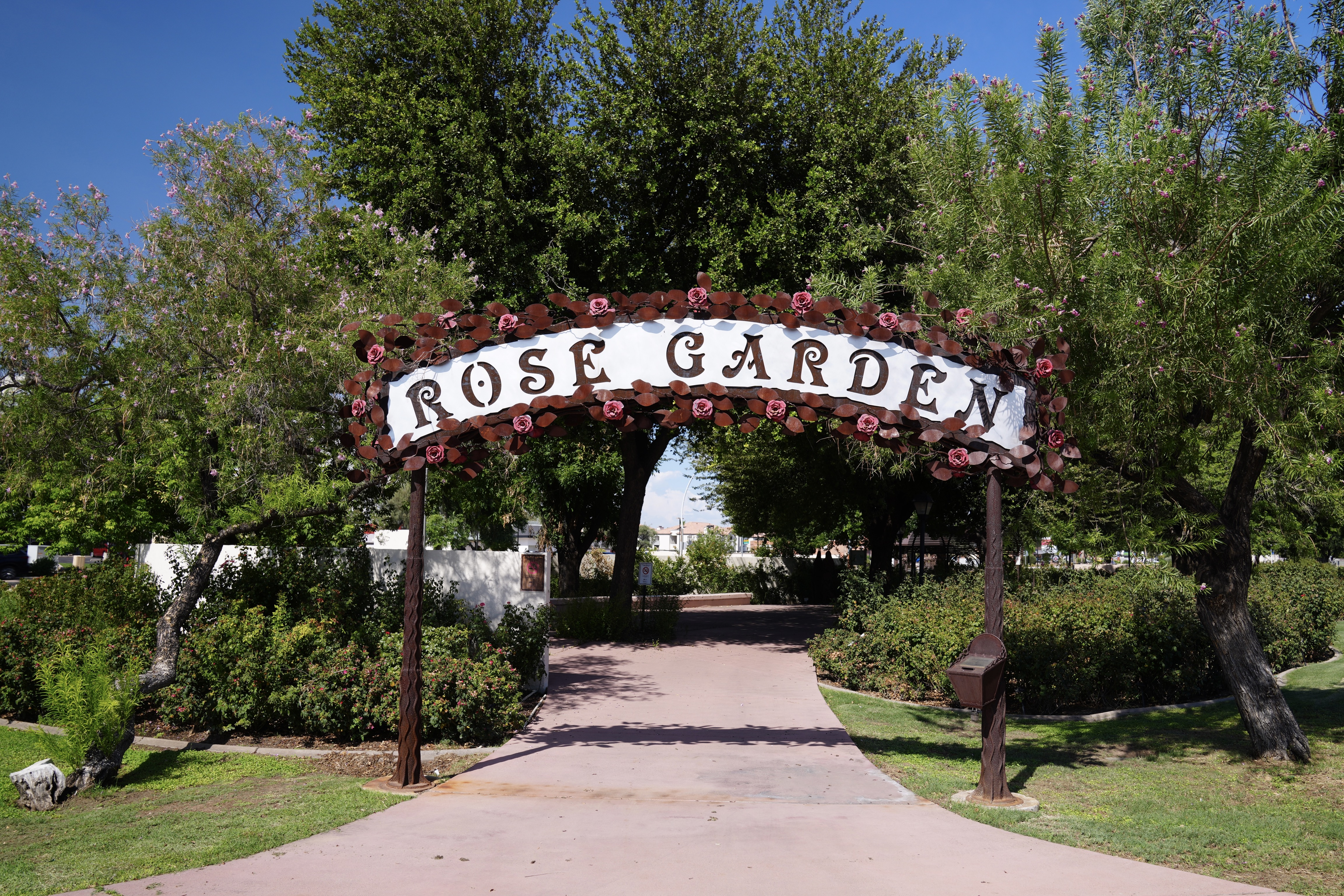
Mesa Community College, Rose Garden
Red Mountain Campus

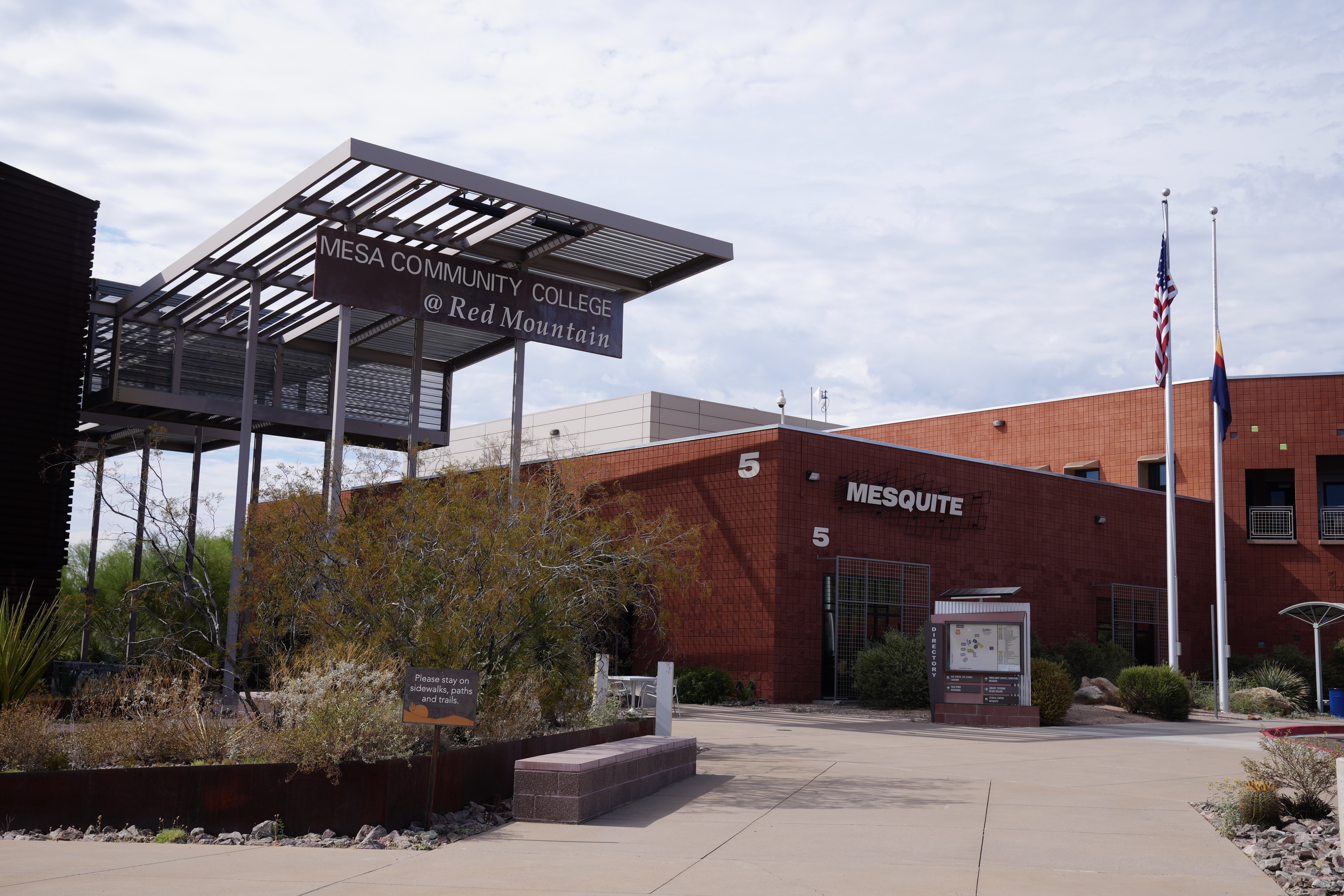
Mesa Community College Red Mountain Campus, Mesa, Arizona

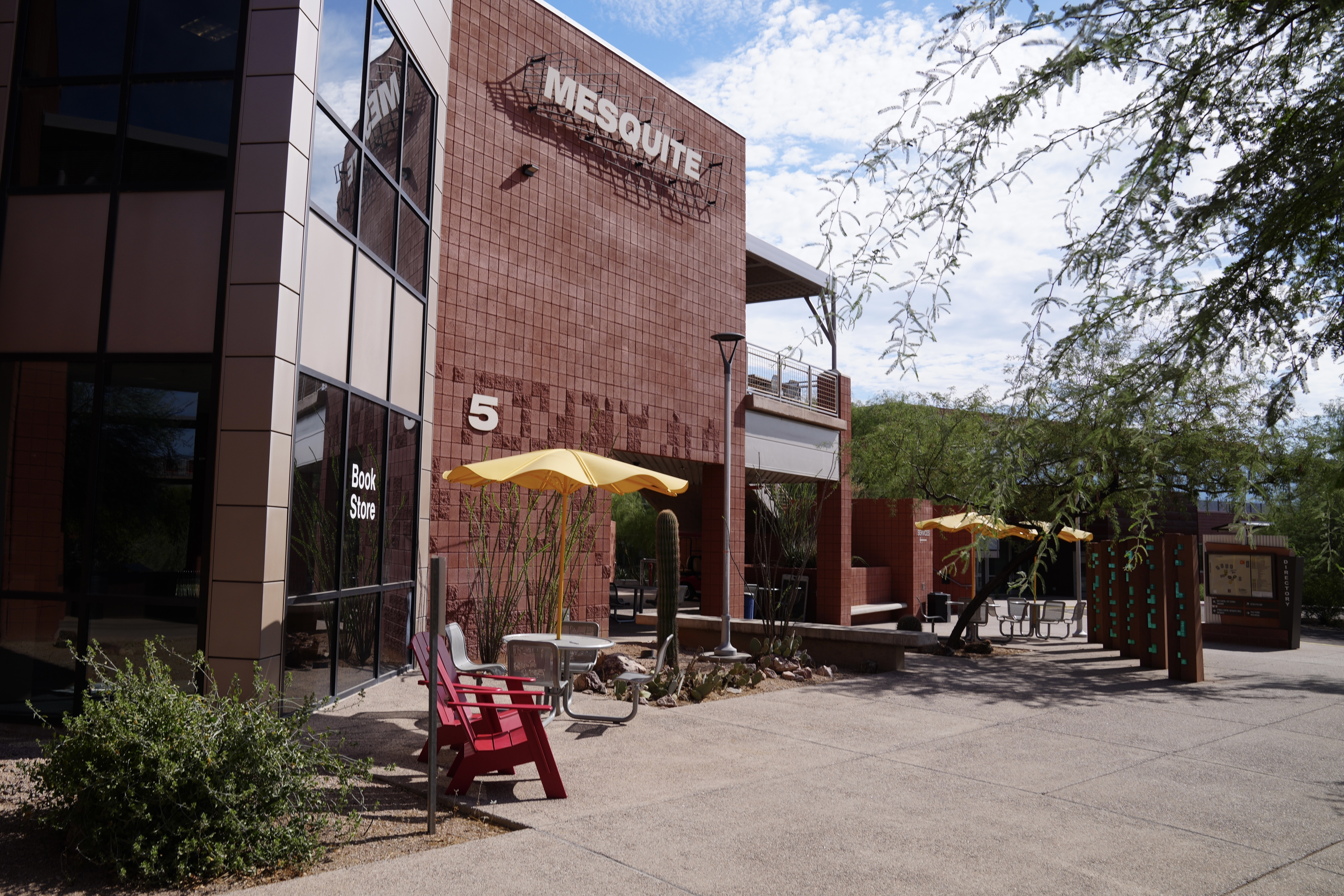
Mesa Community College Bookstore, Mesa, Arizona

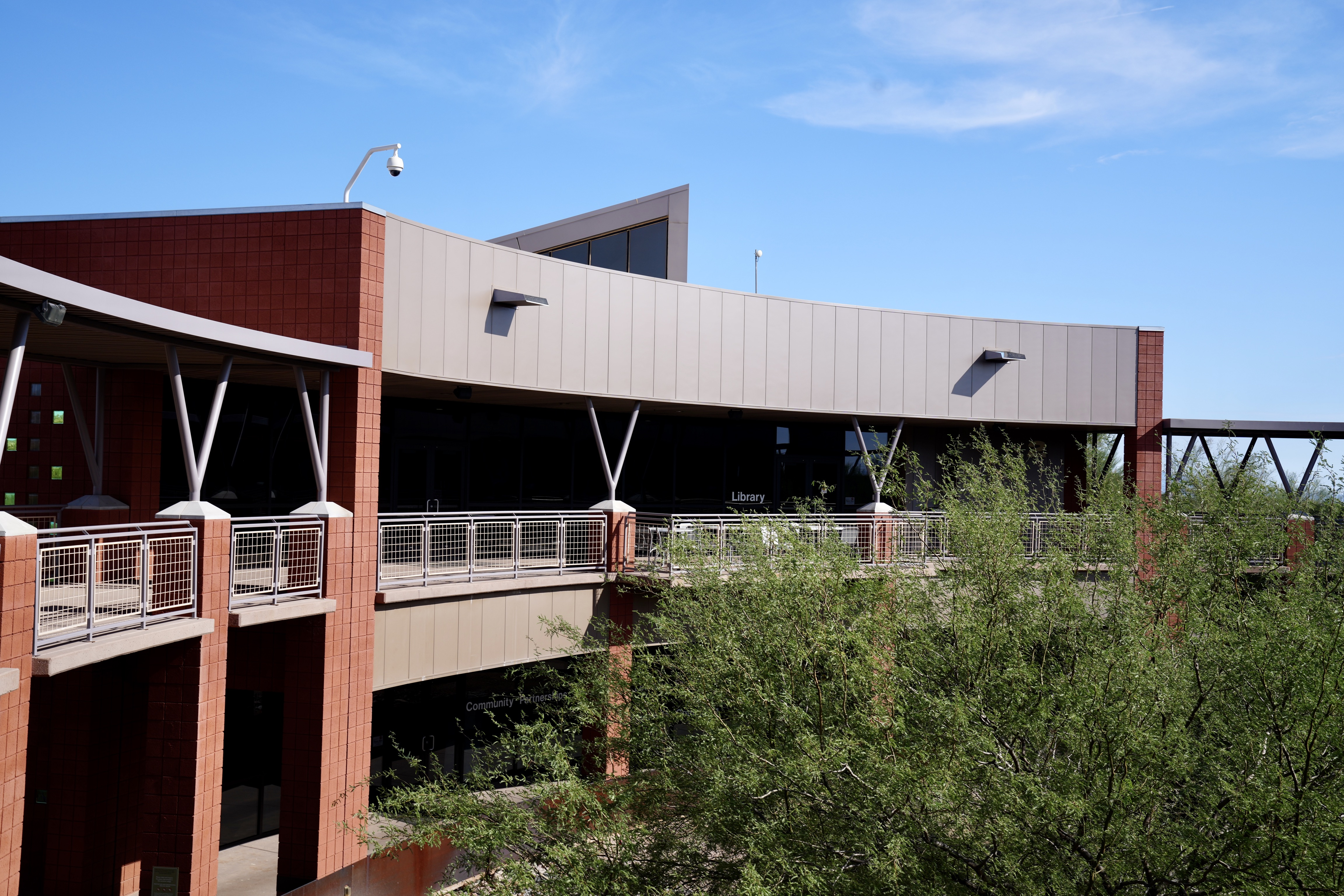
Mesa Community College Library, Mesa, Arizona

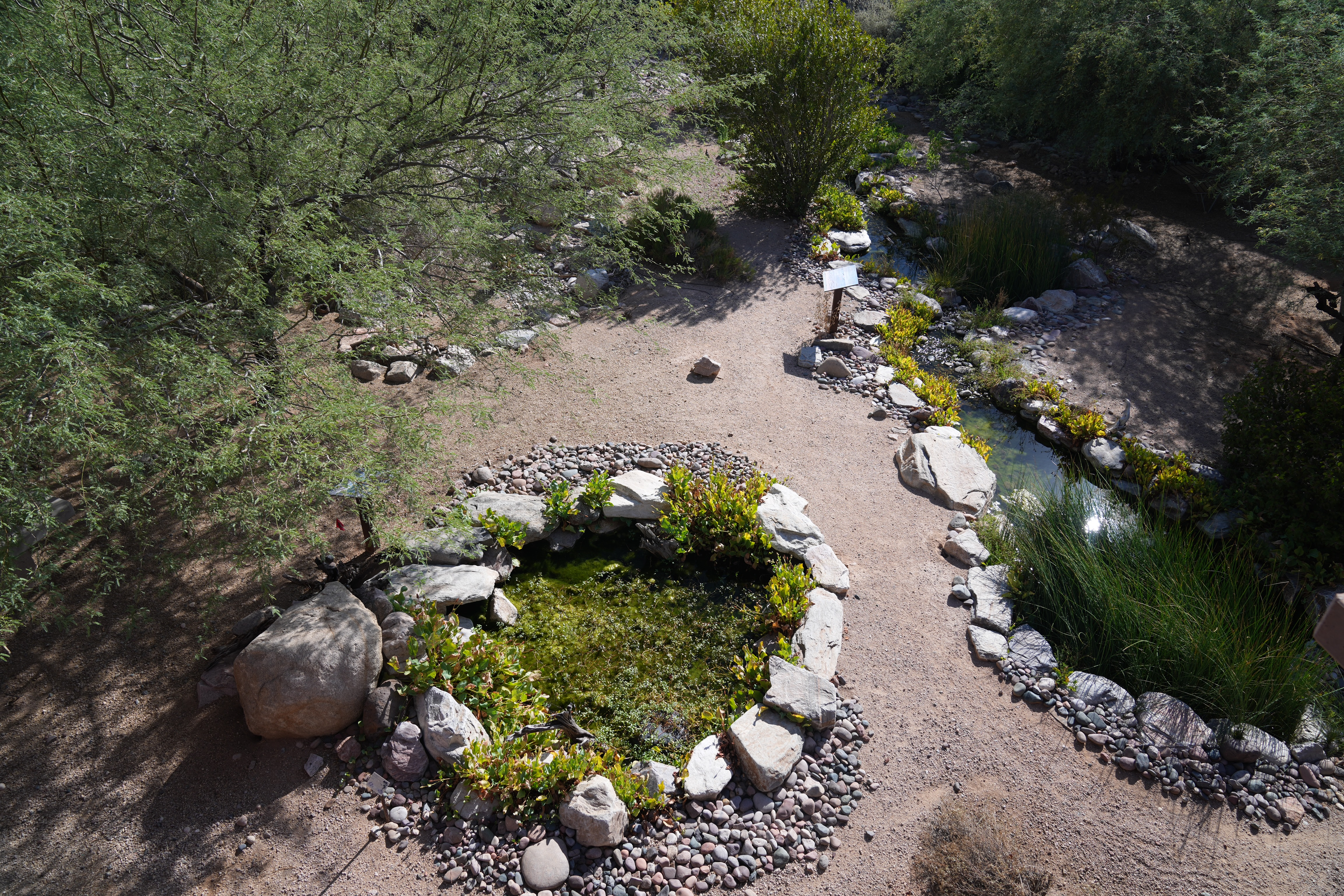
Mesa Community College maintains ponds containing Desert Pupfish and Gila Topminnow populations that can be used to restore the endangered wild populations.
