= St. James Academy (Kansas) =

St. James Academy (Catholic High School)
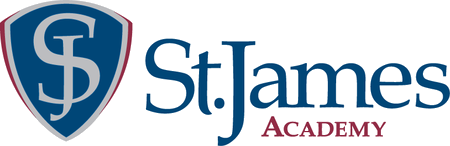

Location
- 24505 Prairie Star Parkway; Lenexa, Kansas 66227; United States; 38°57′27″N 94°52′11″W

Information
- Type: Private
- Motto: Servare Fidem (Keeping Faith)
- Religious affiliation: Roman Catholic
- Established: 2005
- Oversight: Archdiocese of Kansas City in Kansas
- CEEB code: 171720
- President: Andy Tylicki
- Dean: John Muehlberger
- Principal: Shane Rapp
- Chaplain: Fr. Daniel Mauro
- Staff: 16
- Teaching staff: 80
- Grades: 9–12
- Gender: Co-educational
- Enrollment: 923 (2022)
- Campus: Emeritus James Patrick Keleher
- Colors: Navy, crimson, and silver
- Athletics: KSHSAA
- Mascot: Thunder
- Nickname: Thunder
- Team name: St. James Thunder
- Rival: Saint Thomas Aquinas High School (Kansas)
- Accreditation: North Central Association of Colleges and Schools
- Tuition: $12,200-$13,400, with financial assistance available
- Website: www.sjathunder.org
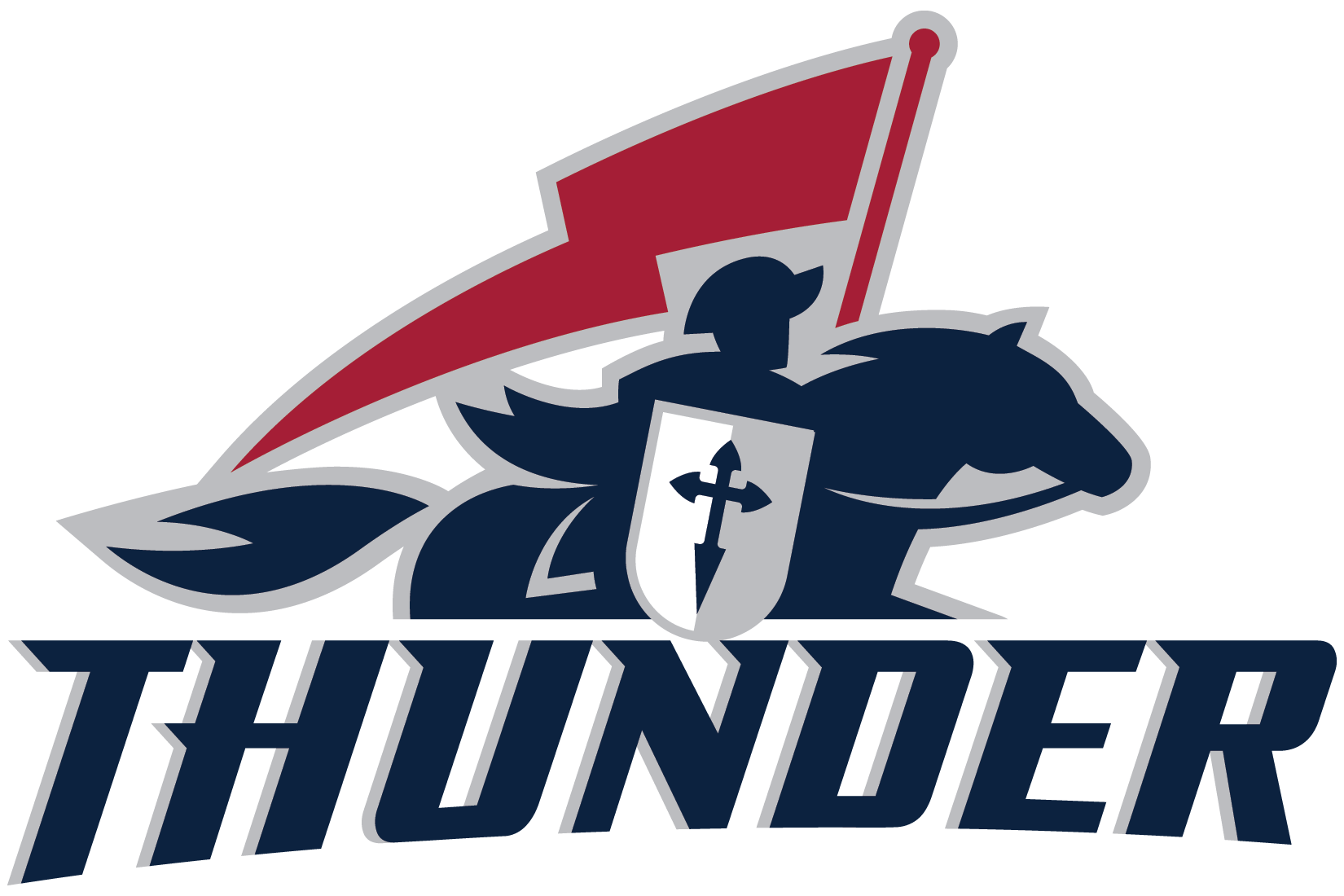

St. James Academy is a Catholic high school in Lenexa, Kansas, United States. It is part of the Roman Catholic Archdiocese of Kansas City in Kansas. It is the only high school located in the city of Lenexa, but there are three public school districts that serve the city.

== History ==
The school was established in 2005. The school was named after St. James the Greater. The campus was named after Archbishop Emeritus James Patrick Keleher.

== Extracurricular activities ==
=== Athletics and activities ===
St. James Academy offers a variety of sports and activities for its students. They are classified as a 5A school, according to Kansas State High School Activities Association.

=== State championships ===
State Championships
Season	Sport/Activity	Number of Championships	Year
Fall	Volleyball	9	2008, 2009, 2010, 2011, 2012, 2013, 2015, 2017, 2018
Fall	Soccer, Boys	2	2009, 2016
Fall	Cross-Country, Girls	4	2017, 2019, 2022, 2023
Fall	Tennis, Girls	1	2017
Fall	Football	2	2020, 2021
Winter	Wrestling	1	2014
Winter	Science Olympiad	1	2010
Winter	Scholars Bowl	4	2019, 2020, 2023, 2026
Winter	Girls Basketball	1	2026
Spring	Track and Field, Girls	4	2013, 2015, 2019, 2025
Spring	Soccer, Girls	4	2008, 2009, 2011, 2019
Spring	Clay target shooting	4	2017, 2018, 2019, 2020
Spring	Baseball	2	2011, 2012
Spring	Golf, Boys	2	2025, 2026
Spring	Tennis, Boys	1	2025
Total		42	

A list of sports offered at St. James are listed below:

Fall Sports

- Cross country running
- Clay target shooting
- Dance and Cheer
- Football
- Golf (Girls)
- Soccer (Boys)
- Tennis (Girls)
- Volleyball

Winter Sports

- Basketball
- Bowling
- Swimming & Diving (Boys)
- Wrestling

Spring Sports

- Baseball
- Clay target shooting
- Boys Golf
- Soccer (Girls)
- Softball
- Swimming & Diving (Girls)
- Track & Field
- Tennis (Boys)

St. James Academy also has competitive teams in Debate, Forensics, Scholars Bowl, and Science Olympiad.

=== Broadcasting ===
A number of St. James Academy sports are broadcast by webcast through the Thunder Broadcasting Network. Also called "TBN", Thunder Broadcasting Network is operated by its student members, who serve as commentators, producers, sideline reporters, camera operators, and sound engineers. Students may also keep statistics during the game to aid the on-air commentary, as well as post to the social media accounts for the Athletics and Activities Department. TBN also broadcasts some school Masses, events of its Community System, student theatre, as well as vocal and instrumental concerts.

St. James Academy also produces a student-run studio journalism project known as the Weekly Storm.

== Notable people ==
=== Alumni ===
- Jenna Gray, volleyball player
- Lexi Watts, soccer player
- Nia Williams, soccer player

=== Faculty ===
- Anthony Sherman, football coach

== See also ==
- List of unified school districts in Kansas
