= Faith Leyba =

American soccer player (born 2005)

Personal information
- Date of birth: July 5, 2005 (age 21)
- Height: 5 ft 10 in (1.78 m)
- Position: Center back

Team information
- Current team: Colorado Buffaloes
- Number: 44

Youth career
- Utah Royals FC-AZ

College career
Years	Team	Apps	(Gls)
2023–	Colorado Buffaloes	67	(7)

International career^{‡}
2026–	United States U-23	1	(1)
- ‡ National team caps and goals as of April 10, 2026

Faith Leyba (born July 5, 2005) is an American college soccer player who plays as a center back for the Colorado Buffaloes. She is the twin sister of Colorado teammate Hope Leyba.

== Early life ==
Leyba grew up in Phoenix, Arizona, the daughter of Joe and Kelly Leyba, and has a twin sister and older brother. Her sister, Hope, plays with her at Colorado. They were born as monoamniotic twins and given a 40% chance of survival. They began playing soccer together in first grade. During college, they wore differently colored cleats so their coaches could tell them apart. Leyba played club soccer for the Utah Royals FC-AZ academy, earning ECNL all-conference honors, and attended Boulder Creek High School, where she played one season.

== College career ==
Leyba started all 21 games and scored 3 goals for the Colorado Buffaloes as a freshman in 2023, earning third-team Pac-12 Conference and all-freshman honors. TopDrawerSoccer named her in the Best XI freshmen in the nation. Following the program's move to the Big 12 Conference, she again started all 22 games and was named first-team All-Big 12 as a sophomore in 2024. In her junior year in 2025, she started all 24 games and scored 4 goals as the Buffaloes set multiple program records, including most wins and most goals. She closed the season strong with three goals in the last four games as Colorado reached the NCAA tournament third round. She was named first-team All-Big 12 and third-team All-American after the season. She was named Big 12 Defender of the Year following her senior campaign in 2026.

== Honors and awards ==
Individual

- Third-team All-American: 2025
- Big 12 Defender of the Year: 2026
- First-team All-Big 12: 2024, 2025, 2026
- Third-team All-Pac-12: 2023
