= Bishop Lynch High School =

Location
- 9750 Ferguson Road; Dallas, Dallas County, Texas 75228; United States; 32°49′06″N 96°40′58″W

Information
- Type: Private, Diocesan, Coeducational
- Motto: Veritas (Truth)
- Religious affiliations: Roman Catholic, Dominican
- Established: 1963
- School district: TAPPS 6A
- President: Christopher Rebuck
- Principal: Dr. Chad Riley
- Chaplain: Father César García
- Faculty: 153
- Grades: 9–12
- Gender: Co-ed
- Student to teacher ratio: 13:1
- Campus size: 22 acres
- Houses: Angelico, Aquinas, De Porres, Frassati, Lima, Montfort, Ricci, Siena
- Colors: Black and White
- Athletics: 19 sports
- Sports: Basketball, Baseball, Softball, Volleyball, Football, Soccer, Wrestling, Track and Field, Powerlifting, Cross Country, Swimming, Crew/Rowing, Lacrosse, Tennis, Golf, Bowling, Brigade, Cheer
- Mascot: Friar
- Accreditation: Southern Association of Colleges and Schools
- Tuition: $26,900 (2026-27)
- Affiliation: Roman Catholic Diocese of Dallas
- Principal: Dr. Chad Riley
- Assistant Principal of Student Formation: Candice Barbosa
- Director of Athletics: Alex Cantillo
- Website: http://www.bishoplynch.org/

Bishop Lynch High School is a college preparatory school of the Roman Catholic Diocese of Dallas founded by the Dominican Order in Dallas, Texas, United States. The school serves grades 9–12. It opened in 1963 with 365 students and now has over 1,000 students. In keeping with its Dominican tradition, the school mascot is a friar.

== Academic achievements ==
The Bishop Lynch TAPPS Academic team of 2011–12, composed of volunteer student competitors from specialties such as Computer Science and Mathematics to Persuasive Speaking and Literary Criticism, brought home the team State Title for the eighth straight year with individual state champions in Spelling, Literary Criticism, Science, Physics, Chemistry, Number Sense, Mathematics, and Advanced Mathematics.

The annual academic, artistic, and athletic achievements of TAPPS member schools are charted in a "school-of-the-year" contest. The results are compiled and the school with the most points is recognized as the overall champion. Bishop Lynch has won the distinction in the following school years: 1995–1996, 1997–1998, 1999–2000 and every school year since.

== Athletics ==
Bishop Lynch is a member of TAPPS and participates in the 6A classification, the largest in the league.

In its history the school's football team has won one TCIL (1988) and six TAPPS (1994, 1995, 1997, 2002, 2003, and 2016) state championships. Their principal rivals have always been Trinity Christian Academy and Nolan Catholic High School. In recent years though, Prestonwood Christian Academy and Bishop Dunne have posed the biggest threats to Bishop Lynch in TAPPS football, with Bishop Lynch topping Dunne in a state championship thriller in 2016.

The Lady Friar volleyball team has won 6 state titles, 2004, 2008, 2012, 2013, 2014, and 2015. Former Head Coach Tricia Roos also received the 2008, 2009, and 2010 District Coach of the Year award.

The Lady Friar basketball team has won 31 TAPPS state titles. This includes a streak of 12 straight which ended in 2000. In 2008, Coach Andy Zihlman was named the Women's Basketball Coaches Association high school Coach of the Year.

The men's wrestling program has notably won 18 state championships in school history, with the most recent win being in February 2025. Other years when the program won the state champions title were in 1996, 1997, 1998, 2000, 2001, 2002, 2003, 2004, 2005, 2007, 2008, 2020, 2022, and 2023. In 2005 and 2008, the school also won the Prep State championship, a contest between TAPPS and SPC schools. The Friars wrestling team also placed second at the Prep National wrestling tournament in 2005 and 2006; the school placed 5th in 2007, and 2nd in 2008.

== Notable alumni ==
- Gene Nichol, 1969, former president of the College of William and Mary, former dean of the University of North Carolina School of Law and the University of Colorado at Boulder Law School.
- Jim McIngvale, 1969, aka Mattress Mack, founder of Gallery Furniture and owner of the Westside Tennis Club in Houston.
- Michael Duca, 1970, Bishop of Baton Rouge
- Richard Martin, 1985, Grammy Award winner.
- Lisa Cole Zimmerman, 1987, soccer player for the U.S. women's national team.
- Stephen Howard 1988, former professional basketball player, played from 1992 to 1998 in the NBA for the Utah Jazz, the Toronto Raptors, the San Antonio Spurs and the Seattle SuperSonics.
- Jeff Brown, 1988, Justice, Supreme Court of Texas.
- Nick Garcia, 1997, professional soccer player, played for Toronto FC in Major League Soccer until 2010. Garcia won the 1996-97 Gatorade National Boys Soccer Player of the Year award, as well, while starring for powerhouse youth club, Dallas Texans. Garcia played college soccer at Indiana University, leading Indiana to consecutive national titles in 1998 and 1999. He was named 1997 National Freshman of the year and 1st All-American in 1999.
- Ryan Moats, 2002, former running back for Houston Texans.
- Evan Gattis, 2004, catcher and DH (designated hitter) for the Houston Astros.
- Justin Wren, Greco-Roman wrestler; professional Mixed Martial Artist currently competing in the Heavyweight division for Bellator MMA.
- Jarek Broussard, 2018, American football running back.
- Madison White, 2019, soccer player

== Notable faculty ==
- Katy Crawford, a Christian music singer
