= Hope Leyba =

American soccer player (born 2005)

Personal information
- Date of birth: July 5, 2005 (age 21)
- Height: 5 ft 10 in (1.78 m)
- Position: Striker

Team information
- Current team: Colorado Buffaloes
- Number: 45

Youth career
- Utah Royals FC-AZ

College career
Years	Team	Apps	(Gls)
2023–	Colorado Buffaloes	86	(42)

International career^{‡}
2026–	United States U-23	1	(0)
- ‡ National team caps and goals as of April 10, 2026

Hope Leyba (born July 5, 2005) is an American college soccer player who plays as a striker for the Colorado Buffaloes. She earned first-team All-American honors after leading the nation in goals in 2025. She is the twin sister of Colorado teammate Faith Leyba.

== Early life ==
Leyba grew up in Phoenix, Arizona, the daughter of Joe and Kelly Leyba, and has a twin sister and older brother. Her sister, Faith, plays with her at Colorado. They were born as monoamniotic twins and given a 40% chance of survival. They began playing soccer together in first grade. During college, they wore differently colored cleats so their coaches could tell them apart. Leyba played club soccer for Real Salt Lake's academy in Arizona, earning ECNL All-American honors. She committed to Colorado during her junior year at Boulder Creek High School, where she scored 32 goals in 16 games in her lone high school season.

== College career ==
Leyba started all 21 games for the Colorado Buffaloes as a freshman in 2023, but scored only twice despite ranking second on the team in shots and shots on goal. She led the Buffaloes with 8 goals in 22 games as a sophomore in 2024, closing the season strong with three goals in four games in the Big 12 and NCAA tournaments. She built on that form in her junior year in 2025, opening the season with goals in five consecutive games and netting two hat tricks by her tenth game, becoming the first Buffalo to score multiple hat tricks in one season. She broke Nikki Martin's single-season program record after reaching 19 goals in 19 games. She helped the team set multiple program records including most wins and made the NCAA tournament third round. She finished the season with 22 goals in 24 games, tied for first in the nation, and was named first-team All-Big 12, first-team All-American, and the Big 12 Forward of the Year.

== International career ==
Leyba was called into United States national team development camp, training concurrently with the senior national team, in January 2026.

== Honors and awards ==
Individual

- First-team All-American: 2025
- Big 12 Forward of the Year: 2025
- First-team All-Big 12: 2025, 2026
- NCAA Division I goals leader: 2025
