= Nebraska Cornhuskers women's soccer =

University of Nebraska–Lincoln soccer team

- Founded: 1994; 32 years ago
- University: University of Nebraska–Lincoln
- Athletic director: Troy Dannen
- Head coach: John Walker (33rd season)
- Conference: Big Ten
- Location: Lincoln, Nebraska
- Stadium: Barbara Hibner Soccer Stadium (capacity: 2,500)
- Nickname: Cornhuskers
- Colors: Scarlet and cream
Home	Away

NCAA tournament Quarterfinals
- 1996, 1999, 2023

NCAA tournament Round of 16
- 1996, 1997, 1998, 1999, 2000, 2001, 2002, 2004, 2023

NCAA tournament appearances
- 1996, 1997, 1998, 1999, 2000, 2001, 2002, 2003, 2004, 2005, 2013, 2016, 2023

Conference tournament championships
- 1996, 1998, 1999, 2000, 2002, 2013

Conference regular season championships
- 1996, 1999, 2000, 2013, 2023

The Nebraska Cornhuskers women's soccer team competes as part of NCAA Division I, representing the University of Nebraska–Lincoln in the Big Ten Conference. Nebraska has played its home games at Barbara Hibner Soccer Stadium since 2015.

The program has been coached by John Walker since its establishment in 1994. Nebraska finished 23–1–0 and reached the national quarterfinal in 1996, the beginning of a five-year stretch in which NU achieved most of its national success. The program has reached in thirteen NCAA Division I tournaments and won a combined eleven conference championships across the Big 12 and Big Ten. Eleven former Cornhuskers have competed in the FIFA Women's World Cup, most of them for Walker's native Canada. Christine Latham and Brittany Timko are enshrined in the Nebraska Athletic Hall of Fame.

== History ==
In 1994, Nebraska became the first Big Eight school to add women's soccer as a varsity sport. NU hired John Walker to lead the new program on the recommendation of Bret Simon, a men's assistant at nearby Creighton. Walker historically advocated an aggressive attack, often playing with four forwards during his early years in Lincoln. He is the only women's soccer coach Nebraska has ever had and one of the longest-tenured head coaches in school history.

Nebraska played as an independent until the Big 12 was formed in 1996. NU began its first season in the new conference 21–0–0, winning the Big 12 regular season and tournament before defeating Minnesota in sudden-death overtime in its first-ever NCAA Division I tournament game, later falling to third-ranked Portland in the NCAA Division I quarterfinal. It was the first of five consecutive national top-ten finishes, but an elimination on penalty kicks against Notre Dame in 1999 and an upset loss to Connecticut in 2000 ended the most successful stretch in program history without a national title.

Nebraska's Big 12 dominance waned in the early 2000s and its ten-year NCAA tournament streak ended in 2006. The program has reached the tournament just three times since joining the Big Ten in 2011, winning two regular-season conference titles and the 2013 Big Ten tournament. After six consecutive seasons with fewer than ten wins, Nebraska reached the national quarterfinal in 2023 before falling to Stanford in extra time; forward Eleanor Dale became the first Cornhusker to lead the country in goals.

== Conference affiliations ==
- Independent (1994–1995)
- Big 12 Conference (1996–2010)
- Big Ten Conference (2011–present)

== Coaches ==
=== Coaching history ===
No.	Coach	Tenure	Overall	Conference
1	John Walker	1994–present	379–208–67 (.631)	163–111–38 (.583)

=== Coaching staff ===
Name	Position	First year	Alma mater
John Walker	Head coach	1994	Queen's University
Savanah Anderson-Baer	Assistant coach	2023	Nebraska
Ian Bridge	Assistant coach	2015	
Austen Parker	Assistant coach	2026	Mid-America Christian

== Venues ==
Nebraska hosted its first seven home matches at Whittier Field, a public park just east of campus, before moving to the Abbott Sports Complex in 1995. The Abbott Sports Complex, located miles from campus, hosted the program for ten years and was the site of a program attendance record of 4,830, a 1–1 draw between NU and second-ranked North Carolina in 2002. The university constructed additional soccer facilities in the Hawks Championship Center as part of a 2005 Memorial Stadium renovation, allowing the program to move on-campus to the Nebraska Soccer Field at Ed Weir Stadium. Ed Weir Stadium was among the smallest soccer venues in the Big Ten.

In 2015, Nebraska constructed Barbara Hibner Soccer Stadium just north of the Bob Devaney Sports Center and adjacent to Nebraska Innovation Campus. Hibner Stadium was built as part of a $20.4-million soccer and tennis complex, and has a listed capacity of 2,500 with 1,800 permanent seats. It is named for former administrator Barbara Hibner, who was integral to the introduction of soccer as a varsity sport at NU and died in 2007.

== Championships and awards ==
=== Conference championships ===
Regular season

- Big 12: 1996, 1999, 2000
- Big Ten: 2013, 2023

Tournament

- Big 12: 1996, 1998, 1999, 2000, 2002
- Big Ten: 2013

=== Individual awards ===
- National coach of the year: John Walker (1996)
- Conference player of the year: (Note: Since 2010, the Big Ten has awarded Forward, Midfield, Defender, and Goalkeeper of the Year instead a traditional Player of the Year.) Kari Uppinghouse (1996), Kim Engesser (1998), Sharolta Nonen (1999), Christine Latham (2000, 2001), Brittany Timko (2004, 2005, 2006), Morgan Marlborough (2009, 2010), Jordan Jackson (2013 – MF), Ari Romero (2013 – DF), Eleanor Dale (2023 – FW)
- Conference freshman / newcomer / rookie of the year: Morgan Marlborough (2009)

=== First-team All-Americans ===
- Kari Uppinghouse – 1996
- Sharolta Nonen – 1999
- Meghan Anderson – 2000
- Jenny Benson – 2000
- Eleanor Dale – 2023

== Postseason results ==
=== NCAA Division I tournament ===
Nebraska has appeared in thirteen NCAA Division I tournaments with a record of 19–12–2.

Year	Round	Opponent	Result
1996	First round Second round Quarterfinal	Minnesota; Duke; Portland	W 3–2 (4OT); W 3–0; L 1–0
1997	First round Second round	Michigan; Notre Dame	W 5–1; L 6–0
1998	First round Second round	Texas A&M; Notre Dame	W 7–0; L 2–1
1999	First round Second round Quarterfinal	Minnesota; Texas A&M; Notre Dame	W 5–0; W 1–0; D 1–1 (Note: Notre Dame advanced on penalty kicks.)
2000	First round Second round	Richmond; Connecticut	W 4–0; L 1–0
2001	First round Second round Third round	Boston College; BYU; Portland	W 5–0; W 3–0; L 4–0
2002	First round Second round Third round	Hartford; Yale; Santa Clara	W 2–0; W 1–0; L 3–2
2003	First round Second round	Washington; Portland	W 2–1; L 4–1
2004	First round Second round Third round	Oral Roberts; Kansas; Illinois	W 3–0; W 2–1 (OT); L 2–1
2005	First round Second round	Creighton; Portland	W 1–0; L 3–2
2013	First round Second round	Southeastern Louisiana; Boston College	W 4–0; L 4–1
2016	First round Second round	South Dakota; UCLA	D 0–0 (2OT) (Note: Nebraska advanced on penalty kicks.); L 2–0
2023	First round Second round Third round Quarterfinal	South Dakota State; Tennessee; UC Irvine; Stanford	W 5–2; W 2–1; W 4–0; L 2–1

== Seasons ==
Regular season champion	Tournament champion	Regular season and tournament champion

Year	Coach	Overall	Conference	Standing	Postseason	Final rank
Independent (1994–1995)
1994	John Walker	14–4–0				
1995	John Walker	10–8–0				
Big 12 Conference (1996–2010)
1996	John Walker	23–1–0	9–0–0	1st	NCAA Division I third round	6
1997	John Walker	18–4–0	8–2–0	2nd	NCAA Division I second round	7
1998	John Walker	17–4–1	9–1–0	2nd	NCAA Division I third round	10
1999	John Walker	22–1–2	10–0–0	1st	NCAA Division I quarterfinal	5
2000	John Walker	22–2–0	9–1–0	1st	NCAA Division I third round	9
2001	John Walker	17–5–1	8–1–1	2nd	NCAA Division I third round	12
2002	John Walker	16–6–3	6–3–1	3rd	NCAA Division I third round	13
2003	John Walker	13–8–1	6–4–0	4th	NCAA Division I second round	23
2004	John Walker	14–9–0	6–4–0	5th	NCAA Division I third round	22
2005	John Walker	14–8–1	6–3–1	2nd	NCAA Division I second round	21
2006	John Walker	10–7–3	4–5–1	5th		
2007	John Walker	5–10–4	1–8–1	T–10th		
2008	John Walker	10–9–1	6–4–0	6th		
2009	John Walker	11–5–4	5–3–2	4th		
2010	John Walker	13–7–1	5–4–1	3rd		
Big Ten Conference (2011–present)
2011	John Walker	7–10–1	4–7	10th		
2012	John Walker	7–12–1	4–7–0	T–7th		
2013	John Walker	19–4–1	10–1–0	1st	NCAA Division I second round	13
2014	John Walker	8–9–2	4–7–2	T–9th		
2015	John Walker	8–7–2	4–5–2	T–9th		
2016	John Walker	11–6–5	5–3–3	6th	NCAA Division I second round	
2017	John Walker	9–5–5	3–3–5	T–8th		
2018	John Walker	9–7–5	5–3–3	5th		
2019	John Walker	4–10–4	3–6–2	T–8th		
2020 (Note: The 2020 NCAA Division I women's soccer season was played in the spring of 2021. Nebraska did not play any out-of-conference games.)	John Walker	2–5–3		11th		
2021	John Walker	7–9–2	3–5–2	11th		
2022	John Walker	8–7–5	5–3–2	T–4th		
2023	John Walker	17–4–3	7–1–2	T–1st	NCAA Division I quarterfinal	7
2024	John Walker	6–10–1	3–7–1	T–12th		
2024	John Walker	8–8–8	3–5–3	12th		

== International competition ==
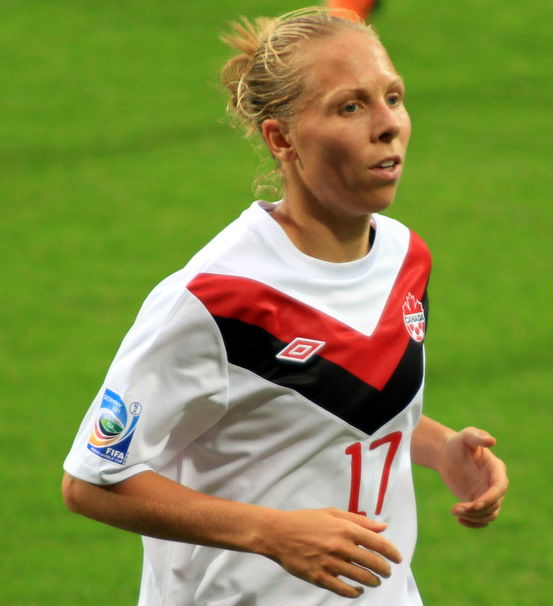
Brittany Timko earned 132 international caps for Canada

=== Women's World Cup ===
Eleven former Nebraska players have represented their country in the FIFA Women's World Cup. Ten of these competed for Canada, a country that Ontario native John Walker recruited heavily. NU hosted a scrimmage against the Canadian national team prior to the 2007 FIFA Women's World Cup.

Year	Host	Player	Position	Country	Finish
1995	Sweden	Isabelle Morneau	DF	Canada	Group stage
1999	United States	Tanya Franck	DF	Canada	Group stage
1999	United States	Karina LeBlanc	GK	Canada	Group stage
1999	United States	Isabelle Morneau	DF	Canada	Group stage
1999	United States	Sharolta Nonen	DF	Canada	Group stage
1999	United States	Amy Walsh	MF	Canada	Group stage
1999	United States	John Walker	Asst. coach	Canada	Group stage
2003	United States	Sasha Andrews	DF	Canada	Fourth place
2003	United States	Tanya Dennis	DF	Canada	Fourth place
2003	United States	Christine Latham	FW	Canada	Fourth place
2003	United States	Karina LeBlanc	GK	Canada	Fourth place
2003	United States	Isabelle Morneau	DF	Canada	Fourth place
2003	United States	Sharolta Nonen	DF	Canada	Fourth place
2003	United States	Brittany Timko	MF	Canada	Fourth place
2007	China	Tanya Dennis	DF	Canada	Group stage
2007	China	Karina LeBlanc	GK	Canada	Group stage
2007	China	Brittany Timko	MF	Canada	Group stage
2007	China	Amy Walsh	MF	Canada	Group stage
2011	Germany	Karina LeBlanc	GK	Canada	Group stage
2011	Germany	Brittany Timko	MF	Canada	Group stage
2015	Canada	Selenia Iacchelli	MF	Canada	Quarterfinal
2015	Canada	Karina LeBlanc	GK	Canada	Quarterfinal
2015	Canada	Arianna Romero	DF	Mexico	Group stage

=== Olympians ===
Olympiad	City	Gymnast	Position	Country	Finish
2008 (XXIX)	(China) Beijing	Karina LeBlanc	GK	Canada	Quarterfinal
2008 (XXIX)	(China) Beijing	Brittany Timko	MF	Canada	Quarterfinal
2008 (XXIX)	(China) Beijing	Amy Walsh	MF	Canada	Quarterfinal
2012 (XXX)	(United Kingdom) London	Karina LeBlanc	GK	Canada	(bronze) Third place
2012 (XXX)	(United Kingdom) London	Brittany Timko	MF	Canada	(bronze) Third place
