= Aaron D. Franklin =

American electrical engineer and academic

- Education: Arizona State University (BS); Purdue University (PhD)
- Known for: Carbon nanotube electronics, Transistor scaling
- Honors: Fellow of the IEEE (2024); Fellow of the National Academy of Inventors (2024)
- Scientific career
- Fields: Electrical engineering, Nanotechnology
- Workplaces: Duke University
- Website: franklin.pratt.duke.edu; ece.duke.edu/people/aaron-franklin; aarondfranklin.com

Aaron D. Franklin is an American electrical engineer, nanotechnology researcher, and professor. He is the Addy Distinguished Professor in the Departments of Electrical and Computer Engineering and Chemistry at Duke University, where he also serves as Associate Dean for Faculty Affairs in the Pratt School of Engineering.

== Education ==
Franklin earned a Bachelor of Science degree in electrical engineering with a minor in communication from Arizona State University in 2004. He began his undergraduate studies at Mesa Community College before transferring to Arizona State. He received a Ph.D. in electrical engineering from Purdue University in 2008, where he was a National Science Foundation Graduate Research Fellow.

== Career ==
Franklin began his scientific career at the IBM T.J. Watson Research Center, where he was a research scientist from 2008–2014. He joined Duke University in 2014, where he was appointed associate professor with tenure in the Departments of Electrical and Computer Engineering (ECE) and Chemistry. He later held the James L. and Elizabeth M. Vincent Associate Professorship (2018–2020) and became the Addy Distinguished Professor in 2020.

At Duke, Franklin has held several administrative positions. He became Associate Dean for Faculty Affairs at the Pratt School of Engineering in 2023, after serving as Associate Dean for Doctoral Education (2021–2023) and Director of Graduate Studies in the Department of ECE (2017–2021).

Franklin was the co-founder and Chief Technology Officer of Tyrata, a tire tread depth sensor company, from 2017 until its acquisition by Bridgestone in 2023. He holds over 50 issued patents, primarily in the fields of nanotechnology and electronic devices.

== Honors and recognition ==
- Elected Fellow of the Institute of Electrical and Electronics Engineers (IEEE) in 2024, for contributions to transistor scaling and carbon nanotube electronics
- Elected Fellow of the National Academy of Inventors (NAI) in 2024
- Mesa Community College Hall of Fame honoree (2022)
- Capers & Marion McDonald Award for Excellence in Teaching and Research, Duke University (2020)
- Dean’s Award for Excellence in Mentoring, Duke University (2021)

== Personal life ==
Franklin joined The Church of Jesus Christ of Latter-day Saints as a young teenager. He served as a full-time missionary for the Church in Atlanta, Georgia, from 1998 to 2000. He is also the author of two religious books: The Spiritual Physics of Light: How We See, Feel, and Know Truth and What Is Truth? Navigating a World of Faith, Science, and Noise.
