= Monica Dolinsky =

American association football player

Personal information
- Date of birth: December 13, 1987 (age 38)
- Place of birth: Milwaukee, United States
- Height: 1.66 m (5 ft 5 in)
- Position: Forward

Youth career
- Carmel Cyclones

College career
Years	Team	Apps	(Gls)
2006–2009	Kansas Jayhawks	74	(21)

Senior career*
Years	Team	Apps	(Gls)
2009	Colorado Force		
2010	Chicago Red Eleven		
2012	Kokkola F10		
2013–2014	Åland United	4	(1)
2015	Mallbackens	7	(0)
2015	Bollstanäs		
- * Club domestic league appearances and goals

Monica Dolinsky is a retired American footballer who played for Åland United.

== Honours ==
Åland United

- Finnish League Champion: 2013
