= Mark Francis (soccer) =

Personal information
- Place of birth: London, England
- Position: Midfielder

Youth career
- 1983–1987: Southern Methodist

Senior career*
Years	Team	Apps	(Gls)
1988–1989	Orlando Lions		
1989–1990	Dayton Dynamo (indoor)		
1990–1991	Richardson Rockets		
1992	North Texas Mid-Cities Flyers		
1993	DFW Toros		
1994	Dallas Rockets		
1995–1996	Mesquite Kickers (indoor)		
1997	Mobile Revellers		

Managerial career
- 1991–1996: Highland Park High School
- 1995: Brookhaven College
- 1997: Mobile Revellers
- 1996–1998: University of South Alabama
- 1999–2023: University of Kansas
- * Club domestic league appearances and goals

Mark Francis is an English former-American soccer midfielder who played in the American Soccer League, American Indoor Soccer Association, SISL and USISL. He has also coached at the high school, college and professional levels. He retired from his position as the women's head coach of the University of Kansas October 23, 2023.

== Player ==
=== Youth ===
Francis attended Southern Methodist University, playing on the men's soccer team from 1983 to 1987. During his four seasons, he was a three time All American, second team in 1984, third team in 1985 and first team in 1986. He graduated from SMU in 1987 with a bachelor's degree in physical education.

=== Professional ===
In 1988, Francis signed with the Orlando Lions of the American Soccer League, remaining with them through the 1989 season. In the fall of 1989, he joined the Dayton Dynamo of the American Indoor Soccer Association. The Dayton Dynamo lost to the Canton Invaders in the championship series. In 1990, he then moved to the Richardson Rockets for the SISL summer indoor soccer season. He continued to play for the Rockets until 1992. In 1991, the SISL was renamed the USISL and the Rockets became the North Texas Mid-Cities Flyers. During this time, the Rockets/Flyers alternated between summer indoor and winter outdoor seasons. The Rockets won the 1991 SISL outdoor season. In 1993, Francis moved to the DFW Toros before returning to the Flyers, now known as the Dallas Rockets in 1993. In 1995, Francis moved again, this time to the Mesquite Kickers for the USISL Indoor season before finishing his playing career with the Mobile Revellers.

== Coach ==
Francis began his coaching career will playing for the Dallas Rockets. In 1991, he was hired as the girls’ soccer coach at Highland Park High School. Over six seasons, he won two Texas State high school championships. In 1995 while still at Highland Park, he began a woman's team at Brookhaven College. In 1996, Francis moved to the University of South Alabama to become the women's soccer coach. In his three seasons, he took the Jaguars to a 33-25-1 record. His worst season was his first as the team finished 2–17. By 1998, he had built the Jaguars into a 13–5 team, being named the Big South Conference Coach of the Year. In 1997, Francis also served as the head coach of the Mobile Revellers while also playing for the team. In 1999, the University of Kansas hired Francis as its women's soccer coach. Francis led Kansas to three NCAA Tournaments, and won the Big 12 in 2004.
