= Danny Sanchez =

American soccer player and coach

Personal information
- Full name: Daniel A. Sanchez
- Date of birth: May 1, 1969 (age 57)
- Place of birth: United States
- Position: Forward

College career
Years	Team	Apps	(Gls)
1987–1988	Mesa Thunderbirds		
1989–1990	Connecticut Huskies		

Senior career*
Years	Team	Apps	(Gls)
1989	Arizona Condors		
1992–1993	Arizona Cotton		

Managerial career
- 1995–2001: Mesa Thunderbirds
- 2002–2007: Metro State Roadrunners
- 2002–2007: Mile High Edge
- 2008–2011: Wyoming Cowgirls
- 2012–: Colorado Buffaloes
- * Club domestic league appearances and goals

Danny Sanchez is an American soccer coach and retired player who is the head coach of the University of Colorado women's soccer team.

== Player ==
Sanchez played for Arcadia Scottsdale United Soccer Club (ASUSC) growing up. He graduated from Coronado High School in Scottsdale, Arizona where he played soccer, football and baseball.

In 1987 and 1988, Sanchez played soccer at Mesa Community College. He is seventh on the school's career goals list. In the summer of 1989, Sanchez played for the Arizona Condors in the Western Soccer League. In 1989, Sanchez transferred to the University of Connecticut where he completed his final two years of collegiate eligibility. In 1991, he graduated with a bachelor's degree in economics. Sanchez then returned to Arizona where he played for the Arizona Cotton in the USISL.

== Coach ==
In 1995, Mesa Community College hired Sanchez to coach both its men's and women soccer teams. From 1995 to 2001, he compiled a 103–15–5 record with the women's team and a 96–36–7 record with the men's team. He was also the 1995 and 2001 Arizona Community College Athletic Conference Coach of the Year. In February 2002, Metropolitan State University hired Sanchez to coach its women's soccer team. Over six seasons, Sanchez took the Roadrunners to a 128–11–7 record and the 2004 and 2006 NCAA Division II Women's Soccer Championship. At the same time as he was coaching Metro State, Sanchez also served as the head coach of the Mile High Edge in the W-League. In December 2007, Sanchez moved to the University of Wyoming. Sanchez did not experience as much success with the Cowgirls as with his two previous collegiate teams. Over four seasons, he took them to a 36–34–11 record. On December 19, 2011, Sanchez became the head coach of the University of Colorado women's team.
