= Colorado Buffaloes women's soccer =

American college soccer team

- Founded: 1996; 30 years ago
- University: University of Colorado
- Athletic director: Fernando Lovo
- Head coach: Danny Sanchez (15th season)
- Conference: Big 12
- Location: Boulder, Colorado, US
- Stadium: Prentup Field (capacity: 2,000)
- Nickname: Buffaloes
- Colors: Silver, black, and gold

NCAA tournament Round of 16
- 2006, 2013, 2025

NCAA tournament Round of 32
- 2004, 2005, 2006, 2007, 2013, 2014, 2016, 2017, 2019, 2024, 2025

NCAA tournament appearances
- 2003, 2004, 2005, 2006, 2007, 2008, 2013, 2014, 2016, 2017, 2019, 2020, 2023, 2024, 2025, 2026

Conference regular season championships
- Big 12 Conference; 2003

The Colorado Buffaloes women's soccer team represents University of Colorado in the Big 12 Conference of NCAA Division I college soccer. Before the 1996 season, the team participated as a club sport. The team is coached by Danny Sanchez and has made the NCAA Tournament 15 times. The team plays its home games at Prentup Field.

== History ==
Colorado women's soccer was established in 1996. The Buffaloes competed in the Big 12 Conference from the program's inception through 2010 before joining the Pac-12 Conference in 2011. They returned to the Big 12 in 2024 following Colorado's conference realignment. In 2003, Colorado won its first Big 12 regular-season championship and made its first appearance in the NCAA Division I Women's Soccer Tournament. Since being hired in 2012, Danny Sanchez has led the Buffaloes to nine NCAA tournament appearances in his first 14 seasons as head coach. As of 2025, Colorado has produced nine All-Americans, and three former players are competing professionally.

The Buffaloes have made NCAA tournament appearances in 2003, 2004, 2005, 2006, 2007, 2008, 2013, 2014, 2016, 2017, 2019, 2020, 2023, 2024, and 2025.

== Results by season ==
Season Results
Year	Coach	Overall record	Conference record	Conference standing	Postseason
(Big 12 Conference) (1996–2010)
1996	Austin Daniels	6–10–1	3–6–0	8th	–
1997	Austin Daniels	6–12–0	5–5–0	5th	–
1998	Austin Daniels	5–12–3	2–6–2	8th	–
1999	Austin Daniels	11–8–1	4–5–1	6th	–
2000	Austin Daniels	8–11–0	4–6–0	7th	–
2001	Bill Hempen	3–11–2	1–7–2	10th	–
2002	Bill Hempen	10–8–2	4–4–2	5th	–
2003	Bill Hempen	15–4–1	8–1–1	1st	NCAA First Round
2004	Bill Hempen	15–6–2	6–3–1	3rd	NCAA Round of 32
2005	Bill Hempen	12–8–4	6–3–1	T–2nd	NCAA Round of 32
2006	Bill Hempen	14–6–4	5–4–1	5th	NCAA Round of 16
2007	Bill Hempen	10–8–4	5–5–0	7th	NCAA Round of 32
2008	Bill Hempen	14–5–4	6–2–2	4th	NCAA First Round
2009	Bill Hempen	9–10–0	6–4–0	3rd	–
2010	Bill Hempen	8–9–3	4–5–1	8th	–
(Pac-12 Conference) (2011–2023)
2011	Bill Hempen	4–13–2	1–9–1	T–11th	–
2012	Danny Sanchez	8–8–4	2–7–2	T–11th	–
2013	Danny Sanchez	14–7–2	4–5–2	T–6th	NCAA Round of 16
2014	Danny Sanchez	14–7–1	6–4–1	3rd	NCAA Round of 32
2015	Danny Sanchez	7–10–3	1–8–2	12th	–
2016	Danny Sanchez	15–6–1	8–2–1	T–2nd	NCAA Round of 32
2017	Danny Sanchez	12–6–4	5–4–2	6th	NCAA Round of 32
2018	Danny Sanchez	13–4–3	5–4–2	5th	–
2019	Danny Sanchez	12–8–2	3–6–2	10th	NCAA Round of 32
2020	Danny Sanchez	9–6–2	5–4–2	5th	NCAA First Round
2021	Danny Sanchez	8–7–4	3–4–4	7th	–
2022	Danny Sanchez	8–7–5	2–6–3	T-9th	–
2023	Danny Sanchez	13–5–3	5–3–3	4th	NCAA First Round
(Big 12 Conference) (2024–present)
2024	Danny Sanchez	12–5–5	4–2–5	9th	NCAA Round of 32
2025	Danny Sanchez	17–4–3	8–1–2	3rd	NCAA Round of 16
Totals: 30 Years – 3 Coaches		312-231-75 (.566)		1 Conference championships	15 Postseason appearances

== Current roster ==
As of June 2026

Note: Flags indicate national team as defined under FIFA eligibility rules; some limited exceptions apply. Players may hold more than one non-FIFA nationality.

No.	Pos.	Nation	Player
0	GK	USA	Madeline Mueller
1	GK	USA	Brooke Goerish
2	MF	IRL	Hannah Healy
3	DF	USA	Jaiden Sidhu
4	DF	USA	Emma Thielbahr
5	DF	USA	Jordan Whiteaker
6	FW	USA	Riley MacDonald
7	DF	USA	Caley Swierenga
8	MF	USA	Sloane Phillips
9	FW	USA	Jace Holley
10	FW	USA	Michaela McGowan
11	FW	USA	Kaia Santomarco-King
12	MF	USA	Lindsey George
13	MF	USA	Lexi Meyer
14	FW	USA	Ruby Hayward

No.	Pos.	Nation	Player
15	DF	IRL	Lillie Quinlivan Coulson
16	MF	USA	Vivi Zacarias
17	DF	USA	Bianca Willis
18	FW	USA	Berkley Mensik
20	MF	USA	Elysse DeBolt
21	FW	USA	Sami Fisher
22	DF	USA	Kenzi Gillispie
23	MF	USA	Sienna McAthy
24	DF	GER	Lilian Zamorano
27	GK	USA	Jamie Campbell
33	MF	USA	Reagan Kotschau
44	DF	USA	Faith Leyba
45	FW	USA	Hope Leyba

== Awards ==
Player	Award	Season
Fran Munnelly	Big 12 Newcomer of the Year	2002
Fran Munnelly	Big 12 Player of the Year	2003
Katie Griffin	Big 12 Newcomer of the Year	2003
Bill Hempen	Big 12 Coach of the Year	2003
Nikki Marshall	Big 12 Newcomer of the Year	2006
Michelle Wenino (co-winner)	Big 12 Defensive Player of the Year	2008

Player	Award	Season
Taylor Kornieck	Pac-12 Freshman of the Year	2016
Jordan Nytes	Big 12 Goalkeeper of the Year	2024
Jordan Nytes	Big 12 Goalkeeper of the Year	2025
Hope Leyba	Big 12 Forward of the Year	2025
Brooke Goerish	Big 12 Freshman of the Year	2026
Reagan Kotschau	Big 12 Midfielder of the Year	2026
Faith Leyba	Big 12 Defender of the Year	2026

=== All-Big 12 Honors ===
Player	First team All-Big 12
Fran Munnelly	2002
Fran Munnelly	2003
Fran Munnelly	2004
Laura Munnelly	2004
Fran Munnelly	2005
Nikki Marshall	2006
Nikki Marshall	2007
Michelle Wenino	2007
Nikki Marshall	2008
Michelle Wenino	2008
Nikki Marshall	2009
Faith Leyba	2024
Jordan Nytes	2024
Jace Holley	2025
Faith Leyba	2025
Hope Leyba	2025
Jordan Nytes	2025
Reagan Kotschau	2026
Faith Leyba	2026
Hope Leyba	2026

Player	Second team All-Big 12
Sloane Cox	1998
Aimee Bugay	2002
Katie Griffin	2003
Laura Munnelly	2003
Tricia Regan	2003
Jessica Keller	2004
Jen Thais	2004
Katie Griffin	2005
Allison Kidd	2005
Laura Munnelly	2005
Laura Munnelly	2006
Nikki Keller	2007
Alex Cousins	2008
Gianna DeSaverio	2008
Nikki Keller	2008
Kirstin Radlinski	2008
Amy Barczuk	2009
Alex Dohm	2010
Kate Russell	2010
Juliauna Hayward	2024
Caley Swierenga	2025
Brooke Goerish	2026
Michaela McGowan	2026
Caley Swierenga	2026

=== All-Pac-12 Honors ===
Player	First team All-Pac-12
Danica Evans	2016
Taylor Kornieck	2016
Taylor Kornieck	2018
Taylor Kornieck	2019
Hannah Sharts	2020
Hannah Sharts	2021
Civana Kuhlmann	2022
Shyra James	2023

Player	Second team All-Pac-12
Amy Barczuk	2012
Anne Stuller	2013
Tori Cooper	2014
Brie Hooks	2014
Madison Krauser	2015
Taylor Kornieck	2017
Jorian Baucom	2018
Jalen Tompkins	2019
Shanade Hopcroft	2021

Player	Third team All-Pac-12
Lizzy Herzl	2013
Becca Rasmussen	2017
Jalen Tompkins	2017
Jalen Tompkins	2018
Shanade Hopcroft	2020
Dani Hansen	2020
Shyra James	2021
Faith Leyba	2023

Note

- ‡ indicates player was Big 12 Newcomer of the Year
- † indicates player was Big 12 Freshman of the Year

All-Big 12 All-Newcomer/Freshman Honors

Player	Big 12 All-Newcomer/Freshman Team
Fran Munnelly ‡	2002
Tricia Regan	2002
Kathryn Grandinetti	2003
Katie Griffin ‡	2003
Jessica Keller	2003
Maddy Minnis	2003
Laura Munnelly	2003
Allie True	2004
Nikki Keller	2005
Nikki Marshall ‡	2006
Jess Quador	2006
Michaela DeJesus	2007
Kym Lowry	2007
Kelly Butler	2008
Caroline Danneberg	2008
Amy Barczuk	2009
Erin Bricker	2009
Annie Brunner	2010
Alex Dohm	2010
Jace Holley	2024
Vivi Zacarias	2025
Brooke Goerish †	2026
Sloane Phillips	2026

Note

- ‡ indicates player was Pac-12 Player of the Year
- † indicates player was Pac-12 Freshman of the Year

All-Pac-12 Freshman Honors

Player	Pac-12 All-Freshman Team
Madison Krauser	2012
Brie Hooks	2013
Sarah Kinzner	2015
Taylor Kornieck †	2016
Jalen Tompkins	2016
Marty Puketapu	2017
Tessa Barton	2019
Shyra James	2020
Juliauna Hayward	2021
Ava Priest	2022
Faith Leyba	2022

== Individual Records ==
Career Goals
Player	Years	Goals
Shyra James	2020–24	47
Nikki Marshall	2006–09	42
Taylor Kornieck	2016–19	39
Hope Leyba	2023–Present	32
Katie Griffin	2003-06	32

Season Goals
Player	Year	Goals
Hope Leyba	2025	22
Nikki Marshall	2006	17
Shyra James	2023	15
Jace Holley	2025	12
Civana Kuhlmann	2022	12
Taylor Kornieck	2019	12
Jorian Baucom	2018	12
Katie Griffin	2005	12

Career Assists
Player	Years	Assists
Taylor Kornieck	2016–19	24
Fran Munnelly	2002–05	24
Kathryn Grandinetti	2003-05	21
Ava Priest	2023–25	18
Madison Krauser	2012–15	16
Kate Russell	2008–11	16

Season Assists
Player	Year	Assists
Emerson Layne	2025	10
Shanade Hopcroft	2021	10
Taylor Kornieck	2018	10
Kathryn Grandinetti	2003	9
Anne Stuller	2013	8

Career Points
Player	Years	Points
Taylor Kornieck	2016–19	102
Shyra James	2020–24	101
Nikki Marshall	2006–09	93
Fran Munnelly	2002-05	84
Katie Griffin	2003–06	78

Season Points
Player	Year	Points
Hope Leyba	2025	45
Nikki Marshall	2006	37
Shyra James	2023	32
Jace Holley	2025	30
Civana Kuhlmann	2022	30
Taylor Kornieck	2019	30
Jorian Baucom	2018	30

Career Saves
Player	Years	Saves
Jalen Tompkins	2015–19	369
Sloane Cox	1997–98	321
Jordan Nytes	2023–25	295
Annie Brunner	2010-13	258
Kirstin Radlinski	2005–08	232

Season Saves
Player	Year	Saves
Sloane Cox	1998	188
Danielle Bassett	1999	144
Sloane Cox	1997	133
Nina Bjornstad	1996	109
Jordan Nytes	2025	121
