= Lisa Cole Zimmerman =

American soccer player (born 1969)

Personal information
- Full name: Lisa Cole Zimmerman
- Birth name: Lisa Denae Cole
- Date of birth: August 30, 1969 (age 57)
- Place of birth: Dallas County, Texas, U.S.
- Height: 5 ft 6 in (1.68 m)
- Position: Forward

Youth career
- –1987: Bishop Lynch Friars

College career
Years	Team	Apps	(Gls)
1987–1990	SMU Mustangs	78	(101)

International career
1990	United States	2	(0)

Managerial career
- Dallas Sting

Lisa Cole Zimmerman (born Lisa Denae Cole; August 30, 1969) is an American former soccer player who played as a forward, making two appearances for the United States women's national team.

== Career ==
Cole Zimmerman played for the Bishop Lynch Friars in high school, where was an All-America selection in 1987. She also played basketball and softball for the Friars, and earned all-state honors in all three sports. In 1987, she was the school's Female Athlete of the Year and Female Academic Athlete of the Year. In college, she played for the SMU Mustangs from 1987 to 1990, having earned a scholarship, and finished as the school's all-time leading scorer with 101 goals and 44 assists in 78 appearances. She was a First Team All-America selection in 1990, and a Freshman All-American in 1987. In 1995 she was inducted into the Bishop Lynch High School Sports Honor Roll, and in 2011 she was inducted into the SMU Mustangs Hall of Fame.

Cole Zimmerman made her international debut for the United States on July 27, 1990 in a friendly match against Canada. In total, she made two appearances for the U.S., earning her final cap on August 9, 1990 in a friendly match against England.

She later coached the Dallas Sting '79 girls' youth team, which were the 1995 under-16 national champions.

== Personal life ==
Cole Zimmerman was born in Dallas County, Texas, to Leta Ruth Denning and Charles C. Cole. She graduated with a Bachelor of Arts in physical education from Southern Methodist University. She married Steven Hayes Zimmerman in Dallas on 18 May 1991.

== Career statistics ==
=== International ===
United States
Year	Apps	Goals
1990	2	0
Total	2	0
