= Metro Conference women's soccer tournament =

Collegiate soccer tournament

MAAC men's soccer tournament
- Sport: College soccer
- Conference: Metro Conference (formerly MAAC)
- Number of teams: 8
- Format: Single-elimination
- Current stadium: Quinnipiac Soccer Stadium
- Current location: Hamden, Connecticut
- Played: 1992–present
- Last contest: 2026
- Current champion: Quinnipiac (3rd title)
- Most championships: Loyola Maryland (10 titles)
- Official website: maacsports.com/wsoc

The Metro Conference women's soccer tournament (formerly the MAAC women's soccer tournament) is the conference championship tournament in soccer for the Metro Conference. The tournament has been held every year since 1992. It is a single-elimination tournament and seeding is based on regular season records. The winner, declared conference champion, receives the conference's automatic bid to the NCAA Division I women's soccer championship.

The tournament consisted of the top six teams from regular season conference play, and in 2024 the tournament expanded to the top eight teams.

== Champions ==
=== Key ===
- (1) — Title number
- a.e.t. — Match went to extra time
- p – Match decided by a penalty shootout after extra time
- – Winning team also won regular season

=== Finals ===
Ed.	Year	Champion	Score	Runner-up	Venue / city	MVP	Ref.
1	1992	Iona (1)	0–0 (3–2 p)	Loyola (MD)		Cindy Waldman, Iona	
2	1993	Fairfield (1)	0–0 (2–0 p)	Loyola (MD)		Christen Veach, Fairfield	
3	1994	Loyola (MD) (1)	2–1	Canisius		Betsy Given, Loyola (MD)	
4	1995	Fairfield (2)	0–0 (3–0 p)	Loyola (MD)		Christen Veach, Fairfield	
5	1996	Loyola (MD) (2)	2–0	Siena		Cara Mooney, Loyola (MD)	
6	1997	Fairfield (3)	1–0 (a.e.t.)	Loyola (MD)		Anne Lyons, Fairfield	
7	1998	Fairfield (4)	1–0 (a.e.t.)	Loyola (MD)		Pam Cluff, Fairfield	
8	1999	Fairfield (5)	1–1 (4–3 p)	Loyola (MD)		Patrice Bourke, Fairfield	
9	2000	Loyola (MD) (3)	2–1	Fairfield		Kathleen Shields, Loyola (MD)	
10	2001	Loyola (MD) (4)	1–0	Marist		Katie Elliot, Loyola (MD)	
11	2002	Loyola (MD) (5)	3–0	Rider		Audra Garuccio, Loyola (MD)	
12	2003	Loyola (MD) (6)	2–0	Niagara		Carolyn Kennington, Loyola (MD)	
13	2004	Loyola (MD) (7)	2–0	Rider		Lindsey Tracey, Loyola (MD)	
14	2005	Fairfield (6)	2–1	Niagara		Alex Caram, Fairfield	
15	2006	Niagara (1)	2–1	Siena		Brittany Bisnott, Niagara	
16	2007	Loyola (MD) (8)	2–0	Marist	Tenney Stadium • Poughkeepsie, NY	Brittany Henderson, Loyola (MD)	
17	2008	Fairfield (7)	3–0	Loyola (MD)	Siena Field • Loudonville, NY	Ahna Johnson, Fairfield	
18	2009	Loyola (MD) (9)	3–2	Niagara	Wide World of Sports Complex • Lake Buena Vista, FL	Gianna Mangione, Loyola (MD)	
19	2010	Siena (1)	1–0 (a.e.t.)	Canisius	Demske Sports Complex • Buffalo, NY	Tabitha Tice, Siena	
20	2011	Marist (1)	1–0	Loyola (MD)	Ridley Athletic Complex • Baltimore, MD	Amanda Epstein, Marist	
21	2012	Loyola (MD) (10)	2–1	Marist	Tenney Stadium • Poughkeepsie, NY	Gigi Mangione, Loyola (MD)	
22	2013	Monmouth (1)	2–0	Fairfield	Wide World of Sports Complex • Lake Buena Vista, FL	Ashley Lewis, Monmouth	
23	2014	Rider (1)	1–1 (5–4 p)	Fairfield	Hesse Field • West Long Branch, NJ	Bethany-May Howard, Rider	
24	2015	Siena (2)	5–2	Manhattan	Hesse Field • West Long Branch, NJ	Allison Clark, Siena	
25	2016	Monmouth (2)	5–2	Quinnipiac	Hesse Field • West Long Branch, NJ	Miranda Konstantinides, Monmouth	
26	2017	Monmouth (3)	5–1	Manhattan	Wide World of Sports Complex • Lake Buena Vista, FL	Allie Girardi, Monmouth	
27	2018	Monmouth (4)	7–1	Siena	Hesse Field • West Long Branch, NJ	Madie Gibson, Monmouth	
28	2019	Monmouth (5)	6–0	Fairfield	Hesse Field • West Long Branch, NJ	Sarina Jones, Monmouth	
29	2020	Siena (3)	0–0 (4–2 p)	Monmouth	Tenney Stadium • Poughkeepsie, NY	Emily McNelis, Siena	
30	2021	Monmouth (6)	4–0	Quinnipiac	Hesse Field • West Long Branch, NJ	Lauren Karabin, Monmouth	
31	2022	Quinnipiac (1)	4–0	Niagara	Quinnipiac Soccer Stadium • Hamden, CT	Rebecca Cooke, Quinnipiac	
32	2023	Quinnipiac (2)	1–0	Fairfield	Quinnipiac Soccer Stadium • Hamden, CT	Courtney Chochol, Quinnipiac	
33	2024	Fairfield (8)	1–0	Quinnipiac	Lessing Field • Fairfield, CT	Maddy Theriault, Fairfield	
34	2025	Sacred Heart (1)	0–0 (4–3 p)	Canisius	Demske Sports Complex • Buffalo, NY	Kyran Thievon (Sacred Heart)	
35	2026	Quinnipiac (3)	1–1 (3–0 p)	Fairfield	Quinnipiac Soccer Stadium • Hamden, CT	Olivia Jarvis (Quinnipiac)	

== Championships by school ==
As of November 2026

Team	Finals	Titles	Winning years
Canisius	3	0	—
Fairfield	14	8	1993, 1995, 1997, 1998, 1999, 2005, 2008, 2024
Iona	1	1	1992
Loyola (MD)	18	10	1994, 1996, 2000, 2001, 2002, 2003, 2004, 2007, 2009, 2012
Manhattan	2	0	—
Marist	4	1	2011
Merrimack	0	0	—
Monmouth	7	6	2013, 2016, 2017, 2018, 2019, 2021
Mount St. Mary's	0	0	—
Niagara	5	1	2006
Quinnipiac	6	3	2022, 2023, 2026
Rider	3	1	2014
Sacred Heart	1	1	2025
Saint Peter's	0	0	—
Siena	6	3	2010, 2015, 2020

Teams in italics no longer sponsor women's soccer in the MAAC.
