= 2024 MAAC women's soccer tournament =

- Classification: Division I
- Teams: 8
- Matches: 7
- Attendance: 2,733
- Site: Campus Sites, Hosted by Higher Seed
- Champions: Fairfield (8th title)
- Winning coach: David Barrett (1st title)
- MVP: Maddy Theriault (Fairfield)
- Broadcast: ESPN+

2024 MAAC women's soccer standings
	Conf.						Overall
Team	W		L		T	PCT	W		L		T	PCT
Fairfield ‍†‍‡‍^{y}	10	–	1	–	1	.875	18	–	3	–	1	.841
Quinnipiac ‍‍‍	10	–	2	–	0	.833	14	–	5	–	1	.725
Canisius ‍‍‍	8	–	2	–	2	.750	12	–	4	–	3	.711
Siena ‍‍‍	7	–	3	–	2	.667	10	–	8	–	2	.550
Manhattan ‍‍‍	5	–	4	–	3	.542	10	–	7	–	3	.575
Merrimack ‍‍‍	5	–	5	–	2	.500	7	–	9	–	3	.447
Iona ‍‍‍	4	–	6	–	2	.417	6	–	10	–	4	.400
Sacred Heart ‍‍‍	3	–	5	–	4	.417	3	–	11	–	5	.289
Mount St. Mary's ‍‍‍	3	–	6	–	3	.375	6	–	9	–	3	.417
Rider ‍‍‍	3	–	6	–	3	.375	4	–	9	–	4	.353
Marist ‍‍‍	3	–	7	–	2	.333	3	–	11	–	3	.265
Niagara ‍‍‍	1	–	7	–	4	.250	5	–	8	–	4	.412
St. Peter's ‍‍‍	1	–	9	–	2	.167	4	–	11	–	2	.294
† – Conference champion ‡ – 2024 MAAC Tournament champion y – Invited to the NCAA Tournament; As of December 10, 2024; Rankings from United Soccer Coaches Poll; Source:MAAC

The 2024 MAAC women's soccer tournament was the postseason women's soccer tournament for the Metro Atlantic Athletic Conference held from November 3 through November 10, 2024. The seven-match tournament took place at campus sites, with the higher seed hosting matches. The host for the matches was determined by seeding from regular season play. The eight-team single-elimination tournament consisted of three rounds based on seeding from regular season conference play. The Quinnipiac Bobcats were the defending champions. As the second seed, they made it to the final where they were defeated by Fairfield 1–0. This was Fairfield's eighth MAAC tournament win in program history, and first for head coach David Barrett. It was their first title since 2008 and the second year in a row that Fairfield and Quinnipiac contested the final. As tournament champions, Fairfield earned the MAAC's automatic berth into the 2024 NCAA Division I women's soccer tournament.

== Seeding ==
The top eight MAAC teams from the regular season earned berths in the tournament. Teams were seeded by conference record. No tiebreakers were required as the top eight teams in the conference all finished with unique conference records.

Seed	School	Conference Record	Points
1	Fairfield	10–1–1	31
2	Quinnipiac	10–2–0	30
3	Canisius	8–2–2	26
4	Siena	7–3–2	23
5	Manhattan	5–4–3	18
6	Merrimack	5–5–2	17
7	Iona	4–6–2	14
8	Sacred Heart	3–5–4	13

== Bracket ==
Quarterfinals; Sunday, Nov. 3
1	Fairfield	1
8	Sacred Heart	0
4	Siena	0
5	Manhattan	1
3	Canisius	2
6	Merrimack	0
2	Quinnipiac	1
7	Iona	0

Semifinals; Thursday, Nov. 7
1	Fairfield	4
5	Manhattan	1
2	Quinnipiac	3
3	Canisius	1

Final; Sunday, Nov. 10
1	Fairfield	1
2	Quinnipiac	0

== Schedule ==
=== Quarterfinals ===
November 3, 2024	#2 Quinnipiac	1–0	#7 Iona	Hamden, CT
12:00 p.m. EST	Aisling Spillane 53'	Report	(red card) 79' Myla Rodrigues	Stadium: Quinnipiac Soccer Stadium; Attendance: 334; Referee: Jan Halaska; Assistant referees: Alex Rusu; Matthew Kue; Fourth official: Jeff Ardis

November 3, 2024	#1 Fairfield	1–0	#8 Sacred Heart	Fairfield, CT
1:00 p.m. EST	Reagan Klarmann 58'; Maddy Theriault (yellow card) 85'	Report	(yellow card) 52' Morgan Bovardi; (yellow card) 74' MacLaren Richards; (yellow card) 89' Kelly Medeiros	Stadium: Lessing Field; Attendance: 353; Referee: Tyler McElhinney; Assistant referees: Kyle O'Grady; David Bork; Fourth official: Frank Severo

November 3, 2024	#3 Canisius	2–0	#6 Merrimack	Buffalo, NY
1:00 p.m. EST	Lizzy Harkness 47'; Jessica Whitaker (yellow card) 71'; Madeline Weltin 81'; Alicia Zamora (yellow card) 84'	Report	(yellow card) 42' Jillian Golden	Stadium: Demske Sports Complex; Attendance: 359; Referee: Rabee Naji; Assistant referees: Ankur Singh; David Rousseau; Fourth official: Shane Magaris

November 3, 2024	#4 Siena	0–1	#5 Manhattan	Loudonville, NY
1:00 p.m. EST		Report	(yellow card) 83', (goal) 89' Olivia McMaster	Stadium: Hickey Field; Attendance: 714; Referee: Franco Somma; Assistant referees: Daniel Rego; Aidan Krok; Fourth official: Yevgeniy Mednikov

=== Semifinals ===
November 7, 2024	#2 Quinnipiac	3–1	#3 Canisius	Hamden, CT
1:00 p.m. EST	Courtney Chochol 52'; Molly Andrews (yellow card) 56'; Aisling Spillane 55', 84', (yellow card) 65'	Report	(yellow card) 43' Lizzy Harkness; (yellow card) 57' Madeline Weltin; 88' Mia Iacona	Stadium: Quinnipiac Soccer Stadium; Referee: Dave Breckner; Assistant referees: William Ferris; Colby Johnson; Fourth official: Frank Severo

November 7, 2024	#1 Fairfield	4–1	#5 Manhattan	Fairfield, CT
7:00 p.m. EST	Sam Kersey 5', 50'; Caroline Kelly 12'; Alex Darcy 42'	Report	28' (pen.) Julia Nicholas	Stadium: Lessing Field; Attendance: 347; Referee: Nathaniel Hirschman; Assistant referees: Aaron Selenica; Ricardo Barreto; Fourth official: Bruno Mozzo

=== Final ===
November 10, 2024	#1 Fairfield	1–0	#2 Quinnipiac	Fairfield, CT
1:00 p.m. EST	Maddy Theriault 74'	Report	(yellow card) 53' Aisling Spillane; (yellow card) 85' Milena Branco	Stadium: Lessing Field; Attendance: 626; Referee: Matthew Mercier; Assistant referees: Stephen Miller; George Frascione; Fourth official: Daniel Aloi

== Statistics ==
=== Goalscorers ===
There were 15 goals scored in 7 matches, for an average of 2.14 goals per match (as of November 10, 2024).

3 goals

- Aisling Spillane – Quinnipiac

2 goals

- Sam Kersey – Fairfield

1 goal

- Courtney Chochol – Quinnipiac
- Alex Darcy – Fairfield
- Lizzy Harkness – Canisius
- Mia Iacona – Canisius
- Caroline Kelly – Fairfield
- Reagan Klarmann – Fairfield
- Olivia McMaster – Manhattan
- Julia Nicholas – Manhattan
- Maddy Theriault – Fairfield
- Madeline Weltin – Canisius

== All-Tournament team ==
Player	Team
Meghan Heath	Canisius
Mia Iacona	Canisius
Reagan Klarmann	Fairfield
Sam Kersey	Fairfield
Allie Kirby	Fairfield
**Maddy Theriault**	Fairfield
Molly Brunk	Manhattan
Julia Nicholas	Manhattan
Victoria Foster	Quinnipiac
Rachel Roman	Quinnipiac
Aisling Spillane	Quinnipiac

MVP in bold
