= List of NCAA Division I women's soccer programs =

This is a list of women's college soccer programs in the United States that play in NCAA Division I. As of the 2025 NCAA Division I women's soccer season, 351 schools in the United States sponsor Division I varsity women's soccer; all are full Division I members except Colorado College, a Division III member which competes in Division I only for women's soccer and men's ice hockey, and four schools that are transitioning from Division II. This list reflects each team's conference affiliation as of the coming 2026 NCAA women's soccer season.

== Current Division I schools ==
Institution	Location	State	Type	Nickname	Conference
Abilene Christian	Abilene	Texas	Private	Wildcats	UAC
Air Force	USAF Academy (Note: Essentially all of the Air Force Academy grounds lie outside the city limits of Colorado Springs. The US Census Bureau and US Postal Service consider the Academy its own entity, respectively designating it as "Air Force Academy" and "USAF Academy".)	Colorado	U.S. Service Academy	Falcons	Mountain West
Akron	Akron	Ohio	Public	Zips	MAC
Alabama	Tuscaloosa	Alabama	Public	Crimson Tide	SEC
Alabama A&M	Normal (Note: The campus mailing address is Huntsville.)	Alabama	Public	Bulldogs	SWAC
Alabama State	Montgomery	Alabama	Public	Hornets	SWAC
Albany	Albany	New York	Public	Great Danes	America East
Alcorn State	Lorman (Note: The campus has a Lorman mailing address, but is physically located in unincorporated Claiborne County.)	Mississippi	Public	Lady Braves	SWAC
American	Washington	District of Columbia	Private	Eagles	Patriot
Appalachian State	Boone	North Carolina	Public	Mountaineers	Sun Belt
Arizona	Tucson	Arizona	Public	Wildcats	Big 12
Arizona State	Tempe	Arizona	Public	Sun Devils	Big 12
Arkansas	Fayetteville	Arkansas	Public	Razorbacks	SEC
Arkansas State	Jonesboro	Arkansas	Public	Red Wolves	Sun Belt
Arkansas–Pine Bluff	Pine Bluff	Arkansas	Public	Golden Lions	SWAC
Army (Note: The school's preferred athletic brand name is Army West Point.)	West Point	New York	U.S. Service Academy	Black Knights	Patriot
Auburn	Auburn	Alabama	Public	Tigers	SEC
Austin Peay	Clarksville	Tennessee	Public	Governors	UAC
Ball State	Muncie	Indiana	Public	Cardinals	MAC
Baylor	Waco	Texas	Private	Bears	Big 12
Bellarmine	Louisville	Kentucky	Private	Knights	ASUN
Belmont	Nashville	Tennessee	Private	Bruins	Missouri Valley
Binghamton	Binghamton (Note: While the university's mailing address is Binghamton, its main campus and athletic facilities are located in the adjacent town of Vestal.)	New York	Public	Bearcats	America East
Boise State	Boise	Idaho	Public	Broncos	Pac-12
Boston College	Newton (Note: The main Boston College campus has a Chestnut Hill mailing address. However, Chestnut Hill is not an incorporated municipal entity. The main BC campus straddles the boundary between the cities of Boston and Newton, and the soccer stadium is on a separate campus fully within the Newton city limits and with a Newton mailing address.)	Massachusetts	Private	Eagles	ACC
Boston University	Boston	Massachusetts	Private	Terriers	Patriot
Bowling Green	Bowling Green	Ohio	Public	Falcons	MAC
Brown	Providence	Rhode Island	Private	Bears	Ivy League
Bryant	Smithfield	Rhode Island	Private	Bulldogs	America East
Bucknell	Lewisburg	Pennsylvania	Private	Bison	Patriot
Buffalo	Buffalo (Note: While the university's mailing address is Buffalo, its main campus and athletic facilities are located in the adjacent town of Amherst.)	New York	Public	Bulls	MAC
Butler	Indianapolis	Indiana	Private	Bulldogs	Big East
BYU	Provo	Utah	Private	Cougars	Big 12
Cal Poly	San Luis Obispo	California	Public	Mustangs	Big West
Cal State Bakersfield (Note: The school started rebranding its athletic program as "Bakersfield" in 2023–24, but the NCAA and national media have yet to follow suit.)	Bakersfield	California	Public	Roadrunners	Big West
Cal State Fullerton	Fullerton	California	Public	Titans	Big West
Cal State Northridge	Northridge (Los Angeles)	California	Public	Matadors	Big West
California	Berkeley	California	Public	Golden Bears	ACC
California Baptist	Riverside	California	Private	Lancers	Big West
Campbell	Buies Creek	North Carolina	Private	Fighting Camels	CAA
Canisius	Buffalo	New York	Private	Golden Griffins	Metro
Central Arkansas	Conway	Arkansas	Public	Sugar Bears	UAC
Central Connecticut	New Britain	Connecticut	Public	Blue Devils	NEC
Central Michigan	Mount Pleasant	Michigan	Public	Chippewas	MAC
Charleston	Charleston	South Carolina	Public	Cougars	CAA
Charleston Southern	North Charleston	South Carolina	Private	Buccaneers	Big South
Charlotte	Charlotte	North Carolina	Public	49ers	American
Chattanooga	Chattanooga	Tennessee	Public	Mocs	Southern
Chicago State	Chicago	Illinois	Public	Cougars	NEC
Cincinnati	Cincinnati	Ohio	Public	Bearcats	Big 12
Clemson	Clemson	South Carolina	Public	Tigers	ACC
Cleveland State	Cleveland	Ohio	Public	Vikings	Horizon
Coastal Carolina	Conway	South Carolina	Public	Chanticleers	Sun Belt
Colgate	Hamilton	New York	Private	Raiders	Patriot
Colorado	Boulder	Colorado	Public	Buffaloes	Big 12
Colorado College	Colorado Springs	Colorado	Private	Tigers	Mountain West (Note: Colorado College is an affiliate of the Mountain West Conference, and primarily plays in the Division III Southern Collegiate Athletic Conference.)
Colorado State	Fort Collins	Colorado	Public	Rams	Pac-12
Columbia	New York (New York City)	New York	Private	Lions	Ivy League
Cornell	Ithaca	New York	Private	Big Red	Ivy League
Creighton	Omaha	Nebraska	Private	Bluejays	Big East
Dartmouth	Hanover	New Hampshire	Private	Big Green	Ivy League
Davidson	Davidson	North Carolina	Private	Wildcats	Atlantic 10
Dayton	Dayton	Ohio	Private	Flyers	Atlantic 10
Delaware	Newark	Delaware	Private–public hybrid (Note: Both Delaware and Delaware State are chartered as "privately governed, state-assisted" institutions.)	Fightin' Blue Hens	CUSA
Delaware State	Dover	Delaware	Private–public hybrid	Hornets	NEC (Note: Delaware State and Howard are affiliates of the NEC (historically known as the Northeast Conference), and primarily play in the Mid-Eastern Athletic Conference.)
Denver	Denver	Colorado	Private	Pioneers	West Coast
DePaul	Chicago	Illinois	Private	Blue Demons	Big East
Detroit Mercy	Detroit	Michigan	Private	Titans	Horizon
Drake	Des Moines	Iowa	Private	Bulldogs	Missouri Valley
Drexel	Philadelphia	Pennsylvania	Private	Dragons	CAA
Duke	Durham	North Carolina	Private	Blue Devils	ACC
Duquesne	Pittsburgh	Pennsylvania	Private	Dukes	Atlantic 10
East Carolina	Greenville	North Carolina	Public	Pirates	American
East Tennessee State	Johnson City	Tennessee	Public	Buccaneers	Southern
East Texas A&M	Commerce	Texas	Public	Lions	Southland
Eastern Illinois	Charleston	Illinois	Public	Panthers	Ohio Valley
Eastern Kentucky	Richmond	Kentucky	Public	Colonels	UAC
Eastern Michigan	Ypsilanti	Michigan	Public	Eagles	MAC
Eastern Washington	Cheney	Washington	Public	Eagles	Big Sky
Elon	Elon	North Carolina	Private	Phoenix	CAA
Evansville	Evansville	Indiana	Private	Purple Aces	Missouri Valley
Fairfield	Fairfield	Connecticut	Private	Stags	Metro
Fairleigh Dickinson	Madison	New Jersey	Private	Knights	NEC
FIU	Miami (Note: FIU has a Miami mailing address, but is located in unincorporated Miami-Dade County in the census-designated place of Westchester.)	Florida	Public	Panthers	CUSA
Florida	Gainesville	Florida	Public	Gators	SEC
Florida Atlantic	Boca Raton	Florida	Public	Owls	American
Florida Gulf Coast	Fort Myers (Note: FGCU has a Fort Myers mailing address, but is located in unincorporated Lee County.)	Florida	Public	Eagles	ASUN
Florida State	Tallahassee	Florida	Public	Seminoles	ACC
Fordham	Bronx (New York City)	New York	Private	Rams	Atlantic 10
Fresno State	Fresno	California	Public	Bulldogs	Pac-12
Furman	Greenville	South Carolina	Private	Paladins	Southern
Gardner–Webb	Boilings Springs	North Carolina	Private	Runnin' Bulldogs	Big South
George Mason	Fairfax (Note: The main GMU campus has a Fairfax mailing address, but is physically located in unincorporated Fairfax County.)	Virginia	Public	Patriots	Atlantic 10
George Washington	Washington	District of Columbia	Private	Revolutionaries	Atlantic 10
Georgetown	Washington	District of Columbia	Private	Hoyas	Big East
Georgia	Athens	Georgia	Public	Bulldogs	SEC
Georgia Southern	Statesboro	Georgia	Public	Eagles	Sun Belt
Georgia State	Atlanta	Georgia	Public	Panthers	Sun Belt
Gonzaga	Spokane	Washington	Private	Bulldogs	Pac-12
Grambling State	Grambling	Louisiana	Public	Tigers	SWAC
Grand Canyon	Phoenix	Arizona	Private	Antelopes	Mountain West
Green Bay	Green Bay	Wisconsin	Public	Phoenix	Horizon
Hampton	Hampton	Virginia	Private	Lady Pirates	CAA
Harvard	Boston (Note: While Harvard's overall administration and undergraduate campus are in Cambridge, the athletic department offices and almost all athletic facilities, including the soccer stadium, are within the Boston city limits and have a Boston mailing address.)	Massachusetts	Private	Crimson	Ivy League
Hawaii	Honolulu	Hawaii	Public	Rainbow Wahine	Mountain West
High Point	High Point	North Carolina	Private	Panthers	Big South
Hofstra	Hempstead	New York	Private	Pride	CAA
Holy Cross	Worcester	Massachusetts	Private	Crusaders	Patriot
Houston	Houston	Texas	Public	Cougars	Big 12
Houston Christian	Houston	Texas	Private	Huskies	Southland
Howard	Washington	District of Columbia	Private	Bison	NEC
Idaho	Moscow	Idaho	Public	Vandals	Big Sky
Idaho State	Pocatello	Idaho	Public	Bengals	Big Sky
Illinois	Champaign (Note: The university's administration and mailing address are in Urbana, but the athletic program offices and mailing address are in Champaign. The soccer stadium is bisected by the Champaign–Urbana border.)	Illinois	Public	Fighting Illini	Big Ten
Illinois State	Normal	Illinois	Public	Redbirds	Missouri Valley
Incarnate Word (Note: The school's preferred athletic brand name is UIW.)	San Antonio	Texas	Private	Cardinals	Southland
Indiana	Bloomington	Indiana	Public	Hoosiers	Big Ten
Indiana State	Terre Haute	Indiana	Public	Sycamores	Missouri Valley
Iona	New Rochelle	New York	Private	Gaels	Metro
Iowa	Iowa City	Iowa	Public	Hawkeyes	Big Ten
Iowa State	Ames	Iowa	Public	Cyclones	Big 12
IU Indy (Note: Inherited the athletic program of Indiana University–Purdue University Indianapolis (IUPUI), which was formally dissolved on July 1, 2024 and replaced by separate institutions within the Indiana University and Purdue University systems. The athletic program's official site adopted the "IU Indy" branding shortly before the institutional split.)	Indianapolis	Indiana	Public	Jaguars	Horizon
Jackson State	Jackson	Mississippi	Public	Tigers	SWAC
Jacksonville	Jacksonville	Florida	Private	Dolphins	ASUN
Jacksonville State	Jacksonville	Alabama	Public	Gamecocks	CUSA
James Madison	Harrisonburg	Virginia	Public	Dukes	Sun Belt
Kansas	Lawrence	Kansas	Public	Jayhawks	Big 12
Kansas City	Kansas City	Missouri	Public	Roos	Summit
Kansas State	Manhattan	Kansas	Public	Wildcats	Big 12
Kennesaw State	Kennesaw (Note: The campus has a Kennesaw mailing address, but is physically in unincorporated Cobb County.)	Georgia	Public	Owls	CUSA
Kent State	Kent	Ohio	Public	Golden Flashes	MAC
Kentucky	Lexington	Kentucky	Public	Wildcats	SEC
La Salle	Philadelphia	Pennsylvania	Private	Explorers	Atlantic 10
Lafayette	Easton	Pennsylvania	Private	Leopards	Patriot
Lamar	Beaumont	Texas	Public	Lady Cardinals	Southland
Le Moyne (Note: Le Moyne started a transition from NCAA Division II in July 2023 and will become a full D-I member in the 2026–27 school year.)	Syracuse (Note: The Le Moyne campus has a Syracuse mailing address, but physically lies in the adjacent town of DeWitt.)	New York	Private	Dolphins	NEC
Lehigh	Bethlehem	Pennsylvania	Private	Mountain Hawks	Patriot
Liberty	Lynchburg	Virginia	Private	Lady Flames	CUSA
Lindenwood	St. Charles	Missouri	Private	Lions	Ohio Valley
Lipscomb	Nashville	Tennessee	Private	Bisons	ASUN
Little Rock	Little Rock	Arkansas	Public	Trojans	UAC
LIU	Brookville (Note: The LIU athletic program represents both of the university's main campuses—LIU Brooklyn in the New York City borough of that name, and LIU Post in Brookville. The women's soccer team is based at Post.)	New York	Private	Sharks	NEC
Long Beach State	Long Beach	California	Public	The Beach	Big West
Longwood	Farmville	Virginia	Public	Lancers	Big South
Louisiana	Lafayette	Louisiana	Public	Ragin' Cajuns	Sun Belt
Louisiana Tech	Ruston	Louisiana	Public	Lady Techsters	Sun Belt
Louisiana–Monroe	Monroe	Louisiana	Public	Warhawks	Sun Belt
Louisville	Louisville	Kentucky	Public	Cardinals	ACC
Loyola Chicago	Chicago	Illinois	Private	Ramblers	Atlantic 10
Loyola (MD)	Baltimore	Maryland	Private	Greyhounds	Patriot
Loyola Marymount	Los Angeles	California	Private	Lions	West Coast
LSU	Baton Rouge	Louisiana	Public	Tigers	SEC
Maine	Orono	Maine	Public	Black Bears	America East
Manhattan	Riverdale (Bronx, New York City)	New York	Private	Jaspers	Metro
Marist	Poughkeepsie	New York	Private	Red Foxes	Metro
Marquette	Milwaukee	Wisconsin	Private	Golden Eagles	Big East
Marshall	Huntington	West Virginia	Public	Thundering Herd	Sun Belt
Maryland	College Park	Maryland	Public	Terrapins	Big Ten
McNeese	Lake Charles	Louisiana	Public	Cowgirls	Southland
Memphis	Memphis	Tennessee	Public	Tigers	American
Mercer	Macon	Georgia	Private	Bears	Southern
Mercyhurst (Note: Mercyhurst and West Georgia started transitions from NCAA Division II in July 2024, and will become full D-I members in the 2027–28 school year.)	Erie	Pennsylvania	Private	Lakers	NEC
Merrimack	North Andover	Massachusetts	Private	Warriors	Metro
Miami (FL)	Coral Gables	Florida	Public	Hurricanes	ACC
Miami (OH)	Oxford	Ohio	Public	RedHawks	MAC
Michigan	Ann Arbor	Michigan	Public	Wolverines	Big Ten
Michigan State	East Lansing	Michigan	Public	Spartans	Big Ten
Middle Tennessee	Murfreesboro	Tennessee	Public	Blue Raiders	CUSA
Milwaukee	Milwaukee	Wisconsin	Public	Panthers	Horizon
Minnesota	Falcon Heights (Note: The Minnesota campus is divided between Minneapolis and Falcon Heights, with the soccer stadium being in the latter. The default place name for the ZIP code serving the Falcon Heights portion is St. Paul, but the US Postal Service accepts both St. Paul and Falcon Heights in addresses of buildings on that portion of the campus.)	Minnesota	Public	Golden Gophers	Big Ten
Mississippi State	Mississippi State	Mississippi	Public	Bulldogs	SEC
Missouri	Columbia	Missouri	Public	Tigers	SEC
Missouri State	Springfield	Missouri	Public	Lady Bears	CUSA
Monmouth	West Long Branch	New Jersey	Private	Hawks	CAA
Montana	Missoula	Montana	Public	Grizzlies	Big Sky
Morehead State	Morehead	Kentucky	Public	Eagles	Ohio Valley
Mount St. Mary's	Emmitsburg (Note: The university's mailing address is Emmitsburg, but its campus is in unincorporated Frederick County.)	Maryland	Private	Mountaineers	Metro
Murray State	Murray	Kentucky	Public	Racers	Missouri Valley
Navy	Annapolis	Maryland	U.S. Service Academy	Midshipmen	Patriot
NC State	Raleigh	North Carolina	Public	Wolfpack	ACC
Nebraska	Lincoln	Nebraska	Public	Cornhuskers	Big Ten
Nevada	Reno	Nevada	Public	Wolf Pack	Mountain West
New Hampshire	Durham	New Hampshire	Public	Wildcats	America East
New Haven (Note: New Haven started a transition from Division II to Division I in the 2025–26 school year, and is scheduled to become a full D-I member in the 2028–29 school year.)	West Haven	Connecticut	Private	Chargers	NEC
New Mexico	Albuquerque	New Mexico	Public	Lobos	Mountain West
New Mexico State	Las Cruces	New Mexico	Public	Aggies	CUSA
Niagara	Niagara University (Note: The Niagara campus is its own census-designated place and postal entity within the town of Lewiston.)	New York	Private	Purple Eagles	Metro
Nicholls	Thibodaux	Louisiana	Public	Colonels	Southland
NJIT	Newark	New Jersey	Public	Highlanders	America East
North Alabama	Florence	Alabama	Public	Lions	UAC
North Carolina	Chapel Hill	North Carolina	Public	Tar Heels	ACC
North Dakota	Grand Forks	North Dakota	Public	Fighting Hawks	Summit
North Dakota State	Fargo	North Dakota	Public	Bison	Summit
North Florida	Jacksonville	Florida	Public	Ospreys	ASUN
North Texas	Denton	Texas	Public	Mean Green	American
Northeastern	Boston	Massachusetts	Private	Huskies	CAA
Northern Arizona	Flagstaff	Arizona	Public	Lumberjacks	Big Sky
Northern Colorado	Greeley	Colorado	Public	Bears	Big Sky
Northern Illinois	DeKalb	Illinois	Public	Huskies	Horizon
Northern Iowa	Cedar Falls	Iowa	Public	Panthers	Missouri Valley
Northern Kentucky	Highland Heights	Kentucky	Public	Norse	Horizon
Northwestern	Evanston	Illinois	Private	Wildcats	Big Ten
Northwestern State	Natchitoches	Louisiana	Public	Lady Demons	Southland
Notre Dame	Notre Dame	Indiana	Private	Fighting Irish	ACC
Oakland	Rochester (Note: The university's mailing address is Rochester, but its campus is split between the cities of Auburn Hills and Rochester Hills.)	Michigan	Public	Golden Grizzlies	Horizon
Ohio	Athens	Ohio	Public	Bobcats	MAC
Ohio State	Columbus	Ohio	Public	Buckeyes	Big Ten
Oklahoma	Norman	Oklahoma	Public	Sooners	SEC
Oklahoma State	Stillwater	Oklahoma	Public	Cowgirls	Big 12
Old Dominion	Norfolk	Virginia	Public	Monarchs	Sun Belt
Ole Miss	University	Mississippi	Public	Rebels	SEC
Omaha	Omaha	Nebraska	Public	Mavericks	Summit
Oral Roberts	Tulsa	Oklahoma	Private	Golden Eagles	Summit
Oregon	Eugene	Oregon	Public	Ducks	Big Ten
Oregon State	Corvallis	Oregon	Public	Beavers	Pac-12
Pacific	Stockton	California	Private	Tigers	West Coast
Penn	Philadelphia	Pennsylvania	Private	Quakers	Ivy League
Penn State	University Park (Note: The entire Penn State campus is designated for postal purposes as "University Park, Pennsylvania". It spreads across three communities—State College, which houses the university administration and core of the academic campus, College Township, location of most athletic facilities, and Ferguson Township, home to most of the university's agricultural operations.)	Pennsylvania	Public–private hybrid	Nittany Lions	Big Ten
Pepperdine	Malibu (Note: Pepperdine has a Malibu mailing address, but is located in unincorporated Los Angeles County.)	California	Private	Waves	West Coast
Pittsburgh	Pittsburgh	Pennsylvania	Public–private hybrid	Panthers	ACC
Portland	Portland	Oregon	Private	Pilots	West Coast
Portland State	Portland	Oregon	Public	Vikings	Big Sky
Prairie View A&M	Prairie View	Texas	Public	Lady Panthers	SWAC
Presbyterian	Clinton	South Carolina	Private	Blue Hose	Big South
Princeton	Princeton	New Jersey	Private	Tigers	Ivy League
Providence	Providence	Rhode Island	Private	Friars	Big East
Purdue	West Lafayette	Indiana	Public	Boilermakers	Big Ten
Purdue Fort Wayne	Fort Wayne	Indiana	Public	Mastodons	Horizon
Queens	Charlotte	North Carolina	Private	Royals	ASUN
Quinnipiac	Hamden	Connecticut	Private	Bobcats	Metro
Radford	Radford	Virginia	Public	Highlanders	Big South
Rhode Island	Kingston	Rhode Island	Public	Rams	Atlantic 10
Rice	Houston	Texas	Private	Owls	American
Richmond	Richmond	Virginia	Private	Spiders	Atlantic 10
Rider	Lawrenceville	New Jersey	Private	Broncs	Metro
Robert Morris	Moon Township	Pennsylvania	Private	Colonials	Horizon
Rutgers	Piscataway (Note: The Rutgers campus is mostly divided between New Brunswick and Piscataway, with small portions in other adjacent communities. The university administration is in New Brunswick; the athletic administration and most athletic facilities, including the soccer stadium, are in Piscataway.)	New Jersey	Public	Scarlet Knights	Big Ten
Sacramento State	Sacramento	California	Public	Hornets	Big West
Sacred Heart	Fairfield	Connecticut	Private	Pioneers	Metro
St. Bonaventure	St. Bonaventure (Note: The St. Bonaventure campus is its own census-designated place and postal entity within the town of Allegany.)	New York	Private	Bonnies	Atlantic 10
St. John's	Jamaica (Note: The mailing address is Queens.)	New York	Private	Red Storm	Big East
Saint Joseph's	Philadelphia (Note: The university's administration and mailing address are in Philadelphia. The main campus is divided by the boundary between Philadelphia and Lower Merion Township, and athletic facilities are in both communities, but the soccer stadium is within the Philadelphia city limits.)	Pennsylvania	Private	Hawks	Atlantic 10
Saint Louis	St. Louis	Missouri	Private	Billikens	Atlantic 10
Saint Mary's	Moraga	California	Private	Gaels	West Coast
Saint Peter's	Jersey City	New Jersey	Private	Peacocks	Metro
St. Thomas	Saint Paul	Minnesota	Private	Tommies	Summit
Sam Houston	Huntsville	Texas	Public	Bearkats	CUSA
Samford	Homewood	Alabama	Private	Bulldogs	Southern
San Diego	San Diego	California	Private	Toreros	West Coast
San Diego State	San Diego	California	Public	Aztecs	Pac-12
San Francisco	San Francisco	California	Private	Dons	West Coast
San Jose State	San Jose	California	Public	Spartans	Mountain West
Santa Clara	Santa Clara	California	Private	Broncos	West Coast
Seattle	Seattle	Washington	Private	Redhawks	West Coast
Seton Hall	South Orange	New Jersey	Private	Pirates	Big East
Siena	Loudonville	New York	Private	Saints	Metro
SIU Edwardsville (Note: The school's preferred athletic brand name is SIUE.)	Edwardsville	Illinois	Public	Cougars	Ohio Valley
SMU	Dallas (Note: The SMU campus has a Dallas mailing address, but virtually all of it (including all athletic facilities) lies in University Park, a city contained within the Dallas city limits.)	Texas	Private	Mustangs	ACC
South Alabama	Mobile	Alabama	Public	Jaguars	Sun Belt
South Carolina	Columbia	South Carolina	Public	Gamecocks	SEC
South Carolina State	Orangeburg	South Carolina	Public	Lady Bulldogs	Independent (Note: South Carolina State primarily plays its other sports in the Mid-Eastern Athletic Conference.)
South Dakota	Vermillion	South Dakota	Public	Coyotes	Summit
South Dakota State	Brookings	South Dakota	Public	Jackrabbits	Summit
South Florida	Tampa	Florida	Public	Bulls	American
Southeast Missouri State (Note: The school's preferred athletic brand name is SEMO.)	Cape Girardeau	Missouri	Public	Redhawks	Ohio Valley
Southeastern Louisiana	Hammond	Louisiana	Public	Lady Lions	Southland
Southern	Baton Rouge	Louisiana	Public	Lady Jaguars	SWAC
Southern Illinois	Carbondale	Illinois	Public	Salukis	Missouri Valley
Southern Indiana	Evansville (Note: The Southern Indiana campus has an Evansville mailing address, but is located in unincorporated Vanderburgh County.)	Indiana	Public	Screaming Eagles	Ohio Valley
Southern Miss	Hattiesburg	Mississippi	Public	Lady Eagles	Sun Belt
Southern Utah	Cedar City	Utah	Public	Thunderbirds	Big Sky
Stanford	Stanford	California	Private	Cardinal	ACC
Stephen F. Austin	Nacogdoches	Texas	Public	Ladyjacks	Southland
Stetson	DeLand	Florida	Private	Hatters	ASUN
Stonehill	Easton	Massachusetts	Private	Skyhawks	NEC
Stony Brook	Stony Brook	New York	Public	Seawolves	CAA
Syracuse	Syracuse	New York	Private	Orange	ACC
Tarleton State (Note: The school brands its athletic program interchangeably as "Tarleton State" and "Tarleton".)	Stephenville	Texas	Public	Texans	UAC
TCU	Fort Worth	Texas	Private	Horned Frogs	Big 12
Temple	Philadelphia	Pennsylvania	Public–private hybrid	Owls	American
Tennessee	Knoxville	Tennessee	Public	Volunteers	SEC
Tennessee Tech	Cookeville	Tennessee	Public	Golden Eagles	Southern
Texas	Austin	Texas	Public	Longhorns	SEC
Texas A&M	College Station	Texas	Public	Aggies	SEC
Texas A&M–Corpus Christi	Corpus Christi	Texas	Public	Islanders	Southland
Texas Southern	Houston	Texas	Public	Tigers	SWAC
Texas State	San Marcos	Texas	Public	Bobcats	Pac-12
Texas Tech	Lubbock	Texas	Public	Red Raiders	Big 12
The Citadel	Charleston	South Carolina	Public	Bulldogs	Southern
Toledo	Toledo	Ohio	Public	Rockets	MAC
Towson	Towson	Maryland	Public	Tigers	CAA
Troy	Troy	Alabama	Public	Trojans	Sun Belt
Tulsa	Tulsa	Oklahoma	Private	Golden Hurricane	American
UAB	Birmingham	Alabama	Public	Blazers	American
UC Davis	Davis	California	Public	Aggies	Mountain West
UC Irvine	Irvine	California	Public	Anteaters	Big West
UC Riverside	Riverside	California	Public	Highlanders	Big West
UC San Diego	La Jolla (San Diego)	California	Public	Tritons	Big West (Note: UC San Diego and UC Santa Barbara join the West Coast Conference in 2027.)
UC Santa Barbara	Santa Barbara (Note: The UCSB campus has a Santa Barbara mailing address, but is located in the adjacent community of Isla Vista.)	California	Public	Gauchos	Big West
UCF	Orlando (Note: The main UCF campus has an Orlando mailing address, but is located in unincorporated Orange County.)	Florida	Public	Knights	Big 12
UCLA	Los Angeles	California	Public	Bruins	Big Ten
UConn	Storrs	Connecticut	Public	Huskies	Big East
UIC	Chicago	Illinois	Public	Flames	Missouri Valley
UMass	Amherst	Massachusetts	Public	Minutewomen	MAC
UMass Lowell	Lowell	Massachusetts	Public	River Hawks	America East
UMBC	Catonsville (Note: The campus mailing address is Baltimore.)	Maryland	Public	Retrievers	America East
UNC Asheville	Asheville	North Carolina	Public	Bulldogs	Big South
UNC Greensboro	Greensboro	North Carolina	Public	Spartans	Southern
UNC Wilmington	Wilmington	North Carolina	Public	Seahawks	CAA
UNLV	Las Vegas (Note: UNLV lies outside the Las Vegas city limits in the unincorporated community of Paradise, but all unincorporated areas in the Las Vegas Valley have a Las Vegas mailing address.)	Nevada	Public	Rebels	Mountain West
USC	Los Angeles	California	Private	Trojans	Big Ten
USC Upstate	Spartanburg	South Carolina	Public	Spartans	Big South
UT Martin	Martin	Tennessee	Public	Skyhawks	Ohio Valley
Utah	Salt Lake City	Utah	Public	Utes	Big 12
Utah State	Logan	Utah	Public	Aggies	Pac-12
Utah Tech	St. George	Utah	Public	Trailblazers	Big Sky
Utah Valley	Orem	Utah	Public	Wolverines	Big West
UTEP	El Paso	Texas	Public	Miners	Mountain West
UT Rio Grande Valley	Edinburg (Note: UTRGV has multiple campuses within its service area, but the athletic program operates from the Edinburg campus, which it inherited from its athletic predecessor of UT Pan American.)	Texas	Public	Vaqueros	Southland
UTSA	San Antonio	Texas	Public	Roadrunners	American
Valparaiso	Valparaiso	Indiana	Private	Beacons	Missouri Valley
Vanderbilt	Nashville	Tennessee	Private	Commodores	SEC
VCU	Richmond	Virginia	Public	Rams	Atlantic 10
Vermont	Burlington	Vermont	Public	Catamounts	America East
Villanova	Villanova	Pennsylvania	Private	Wildcats	Big East
Virginia	Charlottesville (Note: UVA has a Charlottesville mailing address, but the soccer stadium is located in unincorporated Albemarle County, which encloses but does not include the city of Charlottesville.)	Virginia	Public	Cavaliers	ACC
Virginia Tech	Blacksburg	Virginia	Public	Hokies	ACC
VMI	Lexington	Virginia	Public	Keydets	Southern
Wagner	Staten Island (New York City)	New York	Private	Seahawks	NEC
Wake Forest	Winston-Salem	North Carolina	Private	Demon Deacons	ACC
Washington	Seattle	Washington	Public	Huskies	Big Ten
Washington State	Pullman	Washington	Public	Cougars	Pac-12
Weber State	Ogden	Utah	Public	Wildcats	Big Sky
West Florida (Note: West Florida starts a transition from NCAA Division II in July 2026 and will become a full D-I member in the 2029–30 school year.)	Pensacola	Florida	Public	Argonauts	ASUN
West Georgia	Carrollton	Georgia	Public	Wolves	UAC
West Virginia	Morgantown	West Virginia	Public	Mountaineers	Big 12
Western Carolina	Cullowhee	North Carolina	Public	Catamounts	Southern
Western Illinois	Macomb	Illinois	Public	Leathernecks	Ohio Valley
Western Kentucky	Bowling Green	Kentucky	Public	Lady Toppers	CUSA
Western Michigan	Kalamazoo	Michigan	Public	Broncos	MAC
William & Mary	Williamsburg	Virginia	Public	Tribe	CAA
Winthrop	Rock Hill	South Carolina	Public	Eagles	Big South
Wisconsin	Madison	Wisconsin	Public	Badgers	Big Ten
Wofford	Spartanburg	South Carolina	Private	Terriers	Southern
Wright State	Dayton (Note: Wright State has a Dayton mailing address, but is physically located in Fairborn.)	Ohio	Public	Raiders	Horizon
Wyoming	Laramie	Wyoming	Public	Cowgirls	Mountain West
Xavier	Cincinnati	Ohio	Private	Musketeers	Big East
Yale	New Haven	Connecticut	Private	Bulldogs	Ivy League
Youngstown State	Youngstown	Ohio	Public	Penguins	Horizon

== Scheduled additions ==
Current Division I institutions adding women's soccer
School	Location	State	Type	Team	Future conference	Starting
Tennessee State University	Nashville	Tennessee	Public	Lady Tigers	Ohio Valley Conference	2028 (at latest)
