= 2021 MAAC women's soccer tournament =

- Classification: Division I
- Teams: 8
- Matches: 7
- Attendance: 2,013
- Site: Campus Sites, Hosted by Higher Seed
- Champions: Monmouth (6th title)
- Winning coach: Krissy Turner (6th title)
- MVP: Lauren Karabin (Monmouth)
- Broadcast: ESPN+

2021 MAAC women's soccer standings
	Conf.						Overall
Team	W		L		T	PCT	W		L		T	PCT
Monmouth ‍†‍‡‍^{y}	8	–	1	–	1	.850	15	–	4	–	1	.775
Quinnipiac ‍‍‍	7	–	3	–	0	.700	13	–	4	–	1	.750
Niagara ‍‍‍	7	–	3	–	0	.700	13	–	4	–	1	.750
Siena ‍‍‍	6	–	4	–	0	.600	9	–	9	–	1	.500
Iona ‍‍‍	6	–	4	–	0	.600	11	–	8	–	0	.579
Fairfield ‍‍‍	5	–	4	–	1	.550	9	–	6	–	4	.579
Marist ‍‍‍	4	–	4	–	2	.500	5	–	7	–	3	.433
Rider ‍‍‍	3	–	6	–	1	.350	5	–	10	–	2	.353
Manhattan ‍‍‍	3	–	6	–	1	.350	7	–	7	–	1	.500
St. Peter's ‍‍‍	3	–	7	–	0	.300	3	–	13	–	0	.188
Canisius ‍‍‍	0	–	10	–	0	.000	0	–	15	–	2	.059
† – Conference champion ‡ – 2021 MAAC Tournament champion y – Invited to the NCAA Tournament; As of December 7, 2021; Rankings from United Soccer Coaches Poll; Source:MAAC

The 2021 MAAC women's soccer tournament was the postseason women's soccer tournament for the Metro Atlantic Athletic Conference held from October 31 through November 7, 2021. The seven-match tournament took place at campus sites, with the higher seed hosting matches. The host for the matches was determined by seeding from regular season play. The eight-team single-elimination tournament consisted of three rounds based on seeding from regular season conference play. The Siena Saints were the defending champions and were unable to defend their title, losing to the Quinnipiac Bobcats on pentalties in the semifinal. The Monmouth Hawks won the title by defeating Quinnipiac 4–0 in the final. This is Monmouth's sixth overall tournament win and fifth in the last six years. The title is also the sixth for head coach Krissy Turner. As tournament champions, Monmouth earned the MAAC's automatic berth into the 2021 NCAA Division I Women's Soccer Tournament.

== Seeding ==
The top eight teams in the regular season earned a spot in the tournament. Three tiebreakers were required to finalize the seeding for the tournament. Quinnipiac and Niagara tied for second place in the regular season standings, with identical 7–3–0 records. Quinnipiac won the tiebreaker, and was awarded the second seed based on their 1–0 victory over Niagara on October 2 during the regular season. Siena and Iona tied for fourth place in the regular season standings with identical 6–4–0 records. The teams would play each other in the tournament, but a tiebreaker was used to determine the home team in the matchup. Siena was awarded home field advantage based on their 3–2 victory over Iona on October 2 during the regular season. Finally, Rider and Manhattan tied for eight place in the regular season standings and the final tournament berth. Both teams finished with a 3–6–1 regular season record. Rider earned the final tournament berth by virtue of their 1–0 win over Manhattan on October 9 during the regular season.

Seed	School	Conference Record	Points
1	Monmouth	8–1–1	25
2	Quinnipiac	7–3–0	21
3	Niagara	7–3–0	21
4	Siena	6–4–0	18
5	Iona	6–4–0	18
6	Fairfield	5–4–1	16
7	Marist	4–4–2	14
8	Rider	3–6–1	10

== Bracket ==
Quarterfinals; Sunday, Oct. 31
1	Monmouth	3
8	Rider	1
4	Siena	2
5	Iona	0
(Pairings are reseeded after the first round)
2	Quinnipiac	1
7	Marist	0
3	Niagara	1 (4)
6	Fairfield (pen.)	1 (5)

Semifinals; Thursday, Nov. 4
1	Monmouth	4
6	Fairfield	0
2	Quinnipiac (pen.)	1 (5)
4	Siena	1 (3)

Final; Sunday, Nov. 7
1	Monmouth	4
2	Quinnipiac	0

== Schedule ==
=== Quarterfinals ===
October 31, 2021	#2 Quinnipiac	1–0	#7 Marist	Hamden, CT
12:00 p.m. ET	Anna Costello (yellow card) 27'; Gretchen Kron 67'; Courtney Chochol (yellow card) 89'	Report	(yellow card) 38' Britt Van Lenten; (yellow card) 40' Kaylin Sperley	Stadium: Quinnipiac Soccer Stadium; Attendance: 370; Referee: Patrick Violette; Assistant referees: Daniel Aloi; Daniel Rego; Fourth official: Angelo Napolitano

October 31, 2021	#3 Niagara	1–1 (a.e.t.) (4–5 p)	#6 Fairfield	Lewiston, NY
1:00 p.m. ET	Raelyn Stranc (yellow card) 51'; Ida Miceli 75'	Report	(yellow card) 41' Elle Scott; 90' (pen.) Gabby Diodati	Stadium: Niagara Field; Attendance: 183; Referee: Jefferson Dargout; Assistant referees: Ankur Singh; Stephanie Serrano; Fourth official: Nikola Zdjelar
	Penalties
	Alexis Horwedel (penalty scored); Florence Vaillancourt (penalty missed); Mackenzie Mix (penalty scored); Maia MacLean (penalty scored); Emma Bough (penalty scored)		(penalty scored) Hanley Courter; (penalty scored) Gabby Diodati; (penalty scored) Reagan Klarmann; (penalty scored) Maddie Kiely; (penalty scored) Gena Pike

October 31, 2021	#4 Siena	2–0	#5 Iona	Loudonville, NY
1:00 p.m. ET	Carrie Krohn 10', 43', (yellow card) 83'	Report		Stadium: Hickey Field; Attendance: 468; Referee: Matt Mercier; Assistant referees: Ben Russell; Jose Quintero; Fourth official: Kirk Harbinger

October 31, 2021	#1 Monmouth	3–1	#8 Rider	West Long Branch, NJ
3:00 p.m. ET	Alexis Marino 39'; Lauren Karabin 53', 62'; Jazlyn Oviedo (yellow card) 80'	Report	78' Cameron Santers; (yellow card) 80' Niamh Cashin; (yellow card) 85' Chole Fisher	Stadium: Hesse Field; Attendance: 175

=== Semifinals ===
November 4, 2021	#2 Quinnipiac	1–1 (a.e.t.) (5–3 p)	#4 Siena	Hamden, CT
2:00 p.m. ET	Olivia Kudrikow (yellow card) 73'; Rebecca Cooke 84'; Lauren Wendland (yellow card) 109'	Report	42', (yellow card) 84' Emily McNelis	Stadium: Quinnipiac Soccer Stadium; Attendance: 343; Referee: Lorant Varga; Assistant referees: Gregory Muhs; Joe Zawistowski; Fourth official: Angelo Napolitano
	Penalties
	Lauren Wendland (penalty scored); Rebecca Cooke (penalty scored); Courtney Chochol (penalty scored); Selena Salas (penalty scored); Lauren Triglione (penalty scored)		(penalty missed) Darby D'Angelo; (penalty scored) Brianna Montinard; (penalty scored) Ashleigh Sarafin; (penalty scored) Emily McNelis

November 4, 2021	#1 Monmouth	4–0	#6 Fairfield	West Long Branch, NJ
6:00 p.m. ET	Jill Conklin 5'; Lauren Karabin 40'; Alexis Marino 48'; Erin Dailey 56'	Report	(yellow card) 19' Josie Horosky; (yellow card) 70' Elle Scott; (yellow card) 74' Reagan Klarmann	Stadium: Hesse Field; Attendance: 215

=== Final ===
November 7, 2021	#1 Monmouth	4–0	#2 Quinnipiac	West Long Branch, NJ
1:00 p.m. ET	Lauren Bruno 9'; Jesi Rossman 28'; Jill Conklin (yellow card) 38'; Alexis Marino 57'; Gabby Allen (yellow card) 62'; Lauren Karabin 82'	Report	(yellow card) 32' Markela Bejleri; (yellow card) 40' Gretchen Kron	Stadium: Hesse Field; Attendance: 259

== Statistics ==
=== Goalscorers ===
There were 19 goals scored in 7 matches, for an average of 2.71 goals per match (as of November 7, 2021).

4 goals

- Lauren Karabin – Monmouth

3 goals

- Alexis Marino – Monmouth

2 goals

- Carrie Krohn – Siena

1 goal

- Gabby Diodati – Fairfield
- Lauren Bruno – Monmouth
- Jill Conklin – Monmouth
- Erin Dailey – Monmouth
- Jessi Rossman – Monmouth
- Ida Miceli – Niagara
- Rebecca Cooke – Quinnipiac
- Gretchen Kron – Quinnipiac
- Cameron Santers – Rider
- Emily McNelis – Siena

== All-Tournament team ==
Player	Team
**Lauren Karabin**	Monmouth
Lauren Bruno	Monmouth
Jesi Rossman	Monmouth
Rebecca Winslow	Monmouth
Kayla Mingachos	Quinnipiac
Olivia Scott	Quinnipiac
Lauren Triglione	Quinnipiac
Carrie Krohn	Siena
Emily McNelis	Siena
Josie Horosky	Fairfield
Gena Pike	Fairfield

MVP in bold
