= 2022 MAAC women's soccer tournament =

- Classification: Division I
- Teams: 6
- Matches: 5
- Attendance: 1,665
- Site: Campus Sites, Hosted by Higher Seed
- Champions: Quinnipiac (1st title)
- Winning coach: Dave Clarke (1st title)
- MVP: Rebecca Cooke (Quinnipiac)
- Broadcast: ESPN+

2022 MAAC women's soccer standings
	Conf.						Overall
Team	W		L		T	PCT	W		L		T	PCT
Quinnipiac ‍†‍‡‍^{y}	9	–	1	–	0	.900	16	–	3	–	1	.825
Fairfield ‍†‍‍	9	–	1	–	0	.900	14	–	4	–	0	.778
Niagara ‍‍‍	6	–	3	–	1	.650	11	–	8	–	1	.575
Rider ‍‍‍	5	–	5	–	0	.500	8	–	7	–	3	.528
Canisius ‍‍‍	3	–	2	–	5	.550	5	–	5	–	10	.500
Marist ‍‍‍	3	–	5	–	2	.400	5	–	7	–	5	.441
St. Peter's ‍‍‍	3	–	6	–	1	.350	4	–	13	–	1	.250
Iona ‍‍‍	3	–	6	–	1	.350	8	–	7	–	4	.526
Mount St. Mary's ‍‍‍	2	–	5	–	3	.350	3	–	6	–	7	.406
Manhattan ‍‍‍	1	–	5	–	4	.300	3	–	7	–	5	.367
Siena ‍‍‍	1	–	6	–	3	.250	2	–	11	–	5	.250
† – Conference champion ‡ – 2022 MAAC Tournament champion y – Invited to the NCAA Tournament; As of December 6, 2022; Rankings from United Soccer Coaches Poll; Source:MAAC

The 2022 MAAC women's soccer tournament was the postseason women's soccer tournament for the Metro Atlantic Athletic Conference held from October 30 through November 6, 2022. The five-match tournament took place at campus sites, with the higher seed hosting matches. The host for the matches was determined by seeding from regular season play. The six-team single-elimination tournament consisted of three rounds based on seeding from regular season conference play. The Monmouth Hawks were the defending champions and were unable to defend their title, as they moved conferences to the Colonial Athletic Association beginning in the 2022 season. The Quinnipiac Bobcats won the title by defeating Niagara 4–0 in the final. This is Quinnipiac's first overall tournament win in program history. The title is also the first for head coach Dave Clarke. As tournament champions, Quinnipiac earned the MAAC's automatic berth into the 2022 NCAA Division I women's soccer tournament.

== Seeding ==
Six MAAC League schools participated in the tournament. Teams were seeded by conference record. A tiebreaker was required to determine the first and second seed for the tournament as Quinnipiac and Fairfield finished with identical 9–1–0 regular season records. Quinnipiac defeated Fairfield 3–2 on October 1, 2022, and therefore Quinnipiac was the first seed and Fairfield was the second seed.

Seed	School	Conference Record	Points
1	Quinnipiac	9–1–0	27
2	Fairfield	9–1–0	27
3	Niagara	6–3–1	19
4	Rider	5–5–0	15
5	Canisius	3–2–5	14
6	Marist	3–5–2	11

== Bracket ==
Semifinal matchups were determined by the results of the quarterfinals. The #1 seed would play the lowest-remaining seed, while the #2 seed would play the other quarterfinal winner.

Quarterfinals; Sunday, Oct. 30
4	Rider	1 (2)
5	Canisius (pen.)	1 (4)
3	Niagara	3
6	Marist	1

Semifinals; Thursday, Nov. 3
1	Quinnipiac	1
5	Canisius	0
2	Fairfield	1
3	Niagara	3

Final; Sunday, Nov. 6
1	Quinnipiac	4
3	Niagara	0

== Schedule ==
=== Quarterfinals ===
October 30	#3 Niagara	3–1	#6 Marist	Lewiston, NY
12:00 p.m. ET	Ida Miceli 20'; Annie Ibey 24'; Ebba Noren 41'; Emma Bough (yellow card) 63'	Report	(yellow card) 46' Grace Hotaling; 72' Amanda Caldarelli; (yellow card) 89' Anna Maggi	Stadium: Niagara Field; Attendance: 369; Referee: Shane Magaris; Assistant referees: William Bainbridge; Patrick Ohara; Fourth official: Ian Boyle

October 30	#4 Rider	1–1 (a.e.t.) (2–4 p)	#5 Canisius	Lawrenceville, NJ
2:00 p.m. ET	Lindsey Maslow 12'; Genevieve Ryan (yellow card) 84'; Ailis Martin (yellow card) 88'; Leonor Alves (yellow card) 99'	Report	(yellow card) 63' Emma Oliphant; (yellow card) 66' Madeline Weltin; 85' Jen Romero; (yellow card) 86' Team	Stadium: Ben Cohen Field; Attendance: 182; Referee: Zakaria Elabid; Assistant referees: George Evanego; Michael Andreaccio; Fourth official: Stefan Borota
	Penalties
	Makenzie Rodrigues (penalty missed); Anna Barkey (penalty missed); Hannah Freeman (penalty scored); Ailis Martin (penalty scored)		(penalty missed) Lizzy Harkness; (penalty scored) Jen Romero; (penalty scored) Erin Weir; (penalty scored) Meghan Heath; (penalty scored) Tiani Fonoti

=== Semifinals ===
November 3	#1 Quinnipiac	1–0	#5 Canisius	Hamden, CT
2:00 p.m. ET	Molly Andrews (yellow card) 48'; Rebecca Cooke 81' (pen.)	Report	(yellow card) 25' Meghan Heath; (yellow card) 41' Maddy Ingraham; (yellow card) 42' (yellow-red card) 88' Erin Weir; (yellow card) 65' Emma Oliphant; (yellow card) 75' Madeline Weltin; (yellow card) 78' Lizzy Harkness; (yellow card) 81' (yellow-red card) 90' Jen Romero	Stadium: Quinnipiac Soccer Stadium; Attendance: 353; Referee: Victor Borges; Assistant referees: Ronnie Tamburro; Frank Severo; Fourth official: Patrick Violette

November 3	#2 Fairfield	1–3	#3 Niagara	Fairfield, CT
7:00 p.m. ET	Elle Scott 61'	Report	31' Emma Bough; 58' Ebba Noren; 63' Ida Miceli; (yellow card) 75' Agnes Stenlund	Stadium: Lessing Field; Attendance: 427

=== Final ===
November 6	#1 Quinnipiac	4–0	#3 Niagara	Hamden, CT
12:00 p.m. ET	Niagara Own Goal 17'; Morgan Cupo (yellow card) 43'; Rebecca Cooke 59', 79'; Courtney Chochol 67'	Report	(yellow card) 57' Annie Ibey	Stadium: Quinnipiac Soccer Stadium; Attendance: 334; Referee: Lorant Varga; Assistant referees: Victor Matheson; Wilmer Melendez; Fourth official: Clovis Da Silva

== Statistics ==
=== Goalscorers ===
There were 15 goals scored in 5 matches, for an average of 3 goals per match (as of November 6, 2022).

3 goals

- Rebecca Cooke – Quinnipiac

2 goals

- Ida Miceli – Niagara
- Ebba Noren – Niagara

1 goal

- Jen Romero – Canisius
- Elle Scott – Fairfield
- Amanda Caldarelli – Marist
- Emma Bough – Niagara
- Annie Ibey – Niagara
- Lindsey Maslow – Rider
- Courtney Chochol – Quinnipiac

1 own goal

- Niagara (vs Quinnipiac)

== All-Tournament team ==
Player	Team
Lizzy Harkness	Canisius
Meghan Heath	Canisius
Maddie Mills	Fairfield
Elle Scott	Fairfield
Emma Davies	Niagara
Ida Miceli	Niagara
Claudi Cuicani	Niagara
Markela Bejleri	Quinnipiac
Lauren Triglione	Quinnipiac
Olivia Scott	Quinnipiac
**Rebecca Cooke**	Quinnipiac

MVP in bold
