= 2023 MAAC women's soccer tournament =

- Classification: Division I
- Teams: 6
- Matches: 5
- Attendance: 2,399
- Site: Campus Sites, Hosted by Higher Seed
- Champions: Quinnipiac (2nd title)
- Winning coach: Dave Clarke (2nd title)
- MVP: Courtney Chochol (Quinnipiac)
- Broadcast: ESPN+

2023 MAAC women's soccer standings
	Conf.						Overall
Team	W		L		T	PCT	W		L		T	PCT
Quinnipiac ‍†‍‡‍^{y}	9	–	0	–	1	.950	13	–	4	–	1	.750
Fairfield ‍‍‍	7	–	2	–	1	.750	10	–	6	–	4	.600
Canisius ‍‍‍	6	–	2	–	2	.700	9	–	4	–	5	.639
Mount St. Mary's ‍‍‍	5	–	4	–	1	.550	7	–	9	–	3	.447
Niagara ‍‍‍	4	–	4	–	2	.500	5	–	10	–	3	.361
Rider ‍‍‍	4	–	5	–	1	.450	7	–	9	–	2	.444
Manhattan ‍‍‍	3	–	4	–	3	.450	4	–	7	–	4	.400
Siena ‍‍‍	3	–	4	–	3	.450	4	–	9	–	4	.353
Marist ‍‍‍	2	–	5	–	3	.350	2	–	9	–	5	.281
Saint Peter's ‍‍‍	2	–	8	–	0	.200	4	–	11	–	0	.267
Iona ‍‍‍	0	–	7	–	3	.150	1	–	15	–	3	.132
† – Conference champion ‡ – 2023 MAAC Tournament champion y – Invited to the NCAA Tournament; As of December 5, 2023; Rankings from United Soccer Coaches Poll; Source: MAAC

The 2023 MAAC women's soccer tournament was the postseason women's soccer tournament for the Metro Atlantic Athletic Conference held from October 29 through November 5, 2023. The five-match tournament took place at campus sites, with the higher seed hosting matches. The host for the matches was determined by seeding from regular season play. The six-team single-elimination tournament consisted of three rounds based on seeding from regular season conference play. The Quinnipiac Bobcats were the defending champions. They successfully defended their title as the first seed and defeated second seed Fairfield 1–0 in the final. This was Quinnipiac's second MAAC tournament win in program history, both of which have come under head coach Dave Clarke. As tournament champions, Quinnipiac earned the MAAC's automatic berth into the 2023 NCAA Division I women's soccer tournament.

== Seeding ==
Six MAAC schools participated in the tournament. Teams were seeded by conference record. No tiebreakers were required to determine which teams made the tournament as the top six teams finished with unique conference records.

Seed	School	Conference Record	Points
1	Quinnipiac	9–0–1	28
2	Fairfield	7–2–1	22
3	Canisius	6–2–2	20
4	Mount St. Mary's	5–4–1	16
5	Niagara	4–4–2	14
6	Rider	4–5–1	13

== Bracket ==
Semifinal matchups were determined by the results of the quarterfinals. The #1 seed would play the lowest-remaining seed, while the #2 seed would play the other quarterfinal winner.

Quarterfinals; Sunday, Oct. 29
3	Canisius	0
6	Rider	1
4	Mount St. Mary's (pen.)	0 (3)
5	Niagara	0 (1)

Semifinals; Thursday, Nov. 2
1	Quinnipiac	1
6	Rider	0
2	Fairfield	3
4	Mount St. Mary's	0

Final; Sunday, Nov. 5
1	Quinnipiac	1
2	Fairfield	0

== Schedule ==
=== Quarterfinals ===
October 29	#3 Canisius	0–1	#6 Rider	Buffalo, NY
12:00 p.m. ET	Sophia Konstantinou (yellow card) 87'	Report	20', (yellow card) 87' Chloe Fisher	Stadium: Demske Sports Complex; Attendance: 327; Referee: Shane Magaris; Assistant referees: Ankur Singh; Joseph Zwack; Fourth official: Michael Bloom

October 29	#4 Mount St. Mary's	0–0 (a.e.t.) (3–1 p)	#5 Niagara	Emmitsburg, MD
1:00 p.m. ET	Alexa Dragisics (yellow card) 85'	Report	(yellow card) 54' Maia MacLean; (yellow card) 85' Agnes Stenlund	Stadium: Waldron Family Stadium; Attendance: 505; Referee: Nickrod Fateh; Assistant referees: William Robinson; Mark Reichart; Fourth official: Kyle Pfeiffer
	Penalties
	Nathalie Mejia (penalty scored); Taylor Carter (penalty missed); Madison Bee (penalty scored); Luisangely Navas (penalty scored)		(penalty missed) Isabella Mazzaferro; (penalty scored) Emma Bough; (penalty missed) Caitlyn Grady; (penalty missed) Emily Hähnel

=== Semifinals ===
November 2	#1 Quinnipiac	1–0	#6 Rider	Hamden, CT
2:00 p.m. ET	Courtney Chochol 46' (pen.); Olivia Scott (yellow card) 47'; Emely van der Vliet (yellow card) 63'	Report	(yellow card) 13' Chloe Fisher	Stadium: Quinnipiac Soccer Stadium; Attendance: 280

November 2	#2 Fairfield	3–0	#4 Mount St. Mary's	Fairfield, CT
7:00 p.m. ET	Allie Kirby 59'; Maddy Theriault 63', 68'	Report	(yellow card) 39' Kayla Pennington; (yellow card) 83' Madison bee	Stadium: Lessing Field; Attendance: 467

=== Final ===
November 5	#1 Quinnipiac	1–0	#2 Fairfield	Hamden, CT
12:00 p.m. ET	Courtney Chochol 1', (yellow card) 39'; Kayla Mingachos (yellow card) 49'; Ella Gagno (yellow card) 78'	Report	(yellow card) 39' Sydney Corbett	Stadium: Quinnipiac Soccer Stadium; Attendance: 820; Referee: Nathaniel Hirschman; Assistant referees: Bryan Conetta; William Ferris; Fourth official: Victor Matheson

== Statistics ==
=== Goalscorers ===
There were 6 goals scored in 5 matches, for an average of 1.2 goals per match (as of November 5, 2023).

2 goals

- Maddy Theriault – Fairfield
- Courtney Chochol – Quinnipiac

1 goal

- Allie Kirby – Fairfield
- Chloe Fisher – Rider

== All-Tournament team ==
Player	Team
Elle Scott	Fairfield
Maddy Theriault	Fairfield
Katie Wright	Fairfield
Amani Green	Mount St. Mary's
Kayla Pennington	Mount St. Mary's
Madison Alves	Quinnipiac
**Courtney Chochol**	Quinnipiac
Ella Gagno	Quinnipiac
Olivia Scott	Quinnipiac
Genevieve Ryan	Rider
Ellie Sciancalepore	Rider

MVP in bold
