= 2025 MAAC women's soccer tournament =

- Classification: Division I
- Teams: 6
- Matches: 5
- Attendance: 2,224
- Site: Campus Sites, Hosted by Higher Seed
- Champions: Sacred Heart (1st title)
- Winning coach: Matt Micros (1st title)
- MVP: Kyran Thievon (Sacred Heart)
- Broadcast: ESPN+

2025 MAAC women's soccer standings
	Conf.						Overall
Team	W		L		T	PCT	W		L		T	PCT
Fairfield ‍†‍‍	10	–	0	–	2	.917	15	–	2	–	2	.842
Quinnipiac ‍‍‍	8	–	0	–	4	.833	8	–	3	–	6	.647
Canisius ‍‍‍	7	–	4	–	1	.625	8	–	8	–	3	.500
Sacred Heart ‍‍‡‍^{y}	7	–	5	–	0	.583	11	–	9	–	2	.545
Siena ‍‍‍	6	–	3	–	3	.625	9	–	5	–	6	.600
Marist ‍‍‍	5	–	2	–	5	.625	6	–	8	–	5	.447
Manhattan ‍‍‍	6	–	5	–	1	.542	7	–	6	–	5	.528
Iona ‍‍‍	4	–	6	–	2	.417	6	–	10	–	3	.395
Niagara ‍‍‍	3	–	7	–	2	.333	6	–	8	–	2	.438
St. Peter's ‍‍‍	3	–	8	–	1	.292	6	–	9	–	3	.417
Merrimack ‍‍‍	3	–	9	–	0	.250	4	–	12	–	2	.278
Rider ‍‍‍	1	–	6	–	5	.292	3	–	8	–	7	.361
Mount St. Mary's ‍‍‍	1	–	9	–	2	.167	3	–	12	–	2	.235
† – Conference champion ‡ – 2025 MAAC Tournament champion y – Invited to the NCAA Tournament; As of December 9, 2025; Rankings from United Soccer Coaches Poll; Source:MAAC

The 2025 MAAC women's soccer tournament was the postseason women's soccer tournament for the Metro Atlantic Athletic Conference held from November 2 through November 9, 2025. The five-match tournament took place at campus sites, with the higher seed hosting matches. The host for the matches was determined by seeding from regular season play. The six-team single-elimination tournament consisted of three rounds based on seeding from regular season conference play. The Fairfield Stags were the defending champions. They were unable to defend their title as they fell to Sacred Heart in the Semifinals. Sacred Heart would go on to win the tournament over Canisius via penalty shoot-out in the Final. This was Sacred Heart's first MAAC tournament win in program history, and first for head coach Matt Micros. As tournament champions, Sacred Heart earned the MAAC's automatic berth into the 2025 NCAA Division I women's soccer tournament.

== Seeding ==
Six MAAC schools participated in the tournament. Teams were seeded by conference record. A tiebreaker was required for the fourth and fifth seeds as Sacred Heart and Siena both finished with twenty one regular season conference points. Sacred Heart earned the fourth seed by virtue of their 1–0 road win over Siena on September 6. Siena was the fifth seed.

Seed	School	Conference Record	Points
1	Fairfield	10–0–2	32
2	Quinnipiac	8–0–4	28
3	Canisius	7–4–1	22
4	Sacred Heart	7–5–0	21
5	Siena	6–3–3	21
6	Marist	5–2–5	20

== Bracket ==
Semifinal matchups were determined by the results of the quarterfinals. The #1 seed would play the lowest-remaining seed, while the #2 seed would play the other quarterfinal winner.

Quarterfinals; Sunday, Nov. 2
3	Canisius	1
6	Marist	0
4	Sacred Heart	2
5	Siena	1

Semifinals; Thursday, Nov. 6
1	Fairfield	0
4	Sacred Heart	1
2	Quinnipiac	1 (3)
3	Canisius (pen.)	1 (4)

Final; Sunday, Nov. 9
4	Sacred Heart (pen.)	0 (4)
3	Canisius	0 (3)

== Schedule ==
=== First Round ===
November 2	(4) Sacred Heart	2–1	(5) Siena	Fairfield, CT
12:00 p.m. EST	Riley Pettigrew 26', 86'	Report	1' Briana Neary; (yellow card) 66' Mia Van Dyke; (yellow card) 71' Micaiah Croce	Stadium: Park Avenue Field; Attendance: 210; Referee: Philip Benson; Assistant referees: Bryan Conetta; Danny Marques; Fourth official: Franco Somma

November 2	(3) Canisius	1–0	(6) Marist	Buffalo, NY
12:00 p.m. EST	Azaria Fagan 21'; Jessica Whitaker (yellow card) 72'	Report	(yellow card) 36' Anna Maggi	Stadium: Demske Sports Complex; Attendance: 375; Referee: Ankur Singh; Assistant referees: Jim Tomsic; Joseph Zwack; Fourth official: Shane Magaris

=== Semifinals ===
November 6	(2) Quinnipiac	1–1 (a.e.t.) (3–4 p)	(3) Canisius	Hamden, CT
1:00 p.m. EST	Corey Anderson 56'	Report	49' (pen.) Maggie Cregan; (red card) 56' Mary Molloy; (yellow card) 56' Team	Stadium: Quinnipiac Soccer Stadium; Attendance: 290; Referee: Luis Reis; Assistant referees: Bryan Conetta; Adrian Rusu; Fourth official: Alex Rusu
	Penalties
	Morgan Cupo (penalty missed); Molly Andrews (penalty missed); Racquel Alexander (penalty scored); Catherine Graves (penalty scored); Caroline Matyczyk (penalty scored)		(penalty scored) Maggie Cregan; (penalty scored) Skylar Cornell; (penalty scored) Jessica Whitaker; (penalty missed) Azaria Fagan; (penalty scored) Lizzy Harkness

November 6	(1) Fairfield	0–1	(4) Sacred Heart	Fairfield, CT
6:00 p.m. EST		Report	(yellow card) 69' Michelle Shoup; 85' Morgan Bovardi	Stadium: Lessing Field; Attendance: 656; Referee: Nathaniel Hirschman; Assistant referees: Kevin Cavalcanti; Patrick Manga

=== Final ===
November 9	(3) Canisius	0–0 (a.e.t.) (3–4 p)	(4) Sacred Heart	Buffalo, NY
12:00 p.m. EST	Meghan Joerger (yellow card) 58'; Lizzy Harkness (yellow card) 87'		(yellow card) 36' Theanna Burnett; (yellow card) 52' Quinn Pollack	Stadium: Demske Sports Complex; Attendance: 693; Referee: Brian Gordon; Assistant referees: Srdan Ninkovic; Rabee Naji; Fourth official: Ashley Cedro
	Penalties
	Maggie Cregan (penalty scored); Skylar Cornell (penalty scored); Jessica Whitaker (penalty missed); Nicki Silverman (penalty missed); Lizzy Harkness (penalty scored); Kayleigh DiGirolamo (penalty missed)		(penalty scored) Emily Hood; (penalty missed) Shea Kelleher; (penalty missed) Rylee McGee; (penalty scored) Martyna Krzysztopik; (penalty scored) Morgan Bovardi; (penalty scored) Theanna Burnett

== Statistics ==
=== Goalscorers ===
There were 7 goals scored in 5 matches, for an average of 1.4 goals per match (as of November 9, 2025).

2 goals

- Riley Pettigrew – Sacred Heart

1 goal

- Maggie Cregan – Canisius
- Azaria Fagan – Canisius
- Corey Anderson – Quinnipiac
- Morgan Bovardi – Sacred Heart
- Briana Neary – Siena

== All-Tournament team ==
Player	Team
Maggie Cregan	Canisius
Lizzy Harkness	Canisius
Mya Jones	Canisius
Sam Kersey	Fairfield
Katie Wright	Fairfield
Madison Alves	Quinnipiac
Addyson Earle	Quinnipiac
Morgan Bovardi	Sacred Heart
Shea Kelleher	Sacred Heart
Riley Pettigrew	Sacred Heart
**Kyran Thievon**	Sacred Heart

MVP in bold
