= 2016 MAAC women's soccer tournament =

- Classification: Division I
- Teams: 6
- Matches: 5
- Site: Hesse Field; West Long Branch, New Jersey (Semifinals & Final)
- Champions: Monmouth (2nd title)
- Winning coach: Krissy Turner (2nd title)

2016 MAAC women's soccer standings
	Conf.						Overall
Team	W		L		T	PCT	W		L		T	PCT
Monmouth ‍†‍‡‍^{y}	9	–	0	–	1	.950	14	–	5	–	2	.714
Quinnipiac ‍‍‍	7	–	4	–	0	.636	12	–	7	–	1	.625
Siena ‍‍‍	7	–	4	–	0	.636	9	–	7	–	3	.553
Rider ‍‍‍	6	–	3	–	1	.650	9	–	6	–	3	.583
Canisius ‍‍‍	6	–	4	–	0	.600	8	–	9	–	0	.471
Marist ‍‍‍	5	–	4	–	1	.550	10	–	9	–	1	.525
Manhattan ‍‍‍	4	–	5	–	1	.450	6	–	10	–	1	.382
Niagara ‍‍‍	4	–	6	–	0	.400	5	–	10	–	1	.344
Fairfield ‍‍‍	2	–	6	–	2	.300	3	–	13	–	2	.222
Iona ‍‍‍	2	–	7	–	1	.250	2	–	14	–	2	.167
St. Peter's ‍‍‍	0	–	9	–	1	.050	1	–	13	–	2	.125
† – Conference champion ‡ – 2016 MAAC Tournament champion y – Invited to the NCAA tournament As of 2016-11-18; Rankings from NSCAA

The 2016 MAAC women's soccer tournament is the postseason women's soccer tournament for the Metro Atlantic Athletic Conference held from October 29 to November 6, 2016. The five match tournament was held at campus sites, with the semifinals and final held at Hesse Field in West Long Branch, New Jersey. The six team single-elimination tournament consisted of three rounds based on seeding from regular season conference play. The Siena Saints were the defending tournament champions after defeating the Manhattan Jaspers in the championship match.

== Bracket ==
First round Saturday, Oct. 29
3	Rider	0
6	Marist	1^{OT}
4	Quinnipiac	3
5	Canisius	0

Semifinals; Friday, Nov. 4
1	Monmouth	4
6	Marist	1
2	Siena	0
4	Quinnipiac	1

Final; Sunday, Nov. 6
1	Monmouth	5
4	Quinnipiac	2

== Schedule ==
=== First Round ===
October 29, 2016	#4 Quinnipiac	3–0	#5 Canisius	Hamden, Connecticut
2:00 p.m. EST	Kelly Caruso 26'; Al Pelletier 54'; Nadya Gill 67'	Report		Stadium: QU Soccer Field

October 29, 2016	#3 Rider	0–1 (a.e.t.)	#6 Marist	Lawrenceville, New Jersey
7:00 p.m. EST		Report	Brianna Robinson 92'	Stadium: Ben Cohen Field

=== Semifinals ===
November 4, 2016	#1 Monmouth	4–1	#6 Marist	West Long Branch, New Jersey
5:00 p.m. EST	Madie Gibson 20'; Rachael Ivanicki 32'; Rachelle Ross 81', 90'	Report	Brianna Robinson 84'	Stadium: Hesse Field; Referee: David Belmnahia;

November 4, 2016	#2 Siena	0–1	#4 Quinnipiac	West Long Branch, New Jersey
8:00 p.m. EST		Report	Al Pelletier 48'	Stadium: Hesse Field; Referee: Mike DeFelice

=== Final ===
November 6, 2016	#1 Monmouth	5–2	#4 Quinnipiac	West Long Branch, New Jersey
3:00 p.m. EST	Alli DeLuca 23'; Rachael Ivanicki 32'; Miranda Konstantinides 43', 50'; Madie Gibson 62'	Report	Kelly Caruso 53'; Jess Gargan 85'	Stadium: Hesse Field; Referee: John Barr
