= Hughson =

Hughson may refer to:

- Hughson (surname)
- Hughson, California, city in California, United States

== See also ==
- Hughson Mansion, historic home in Albany County, New York, United States
