= Rebecca Cooke (footballer) =

Irish footballer (born 2002)

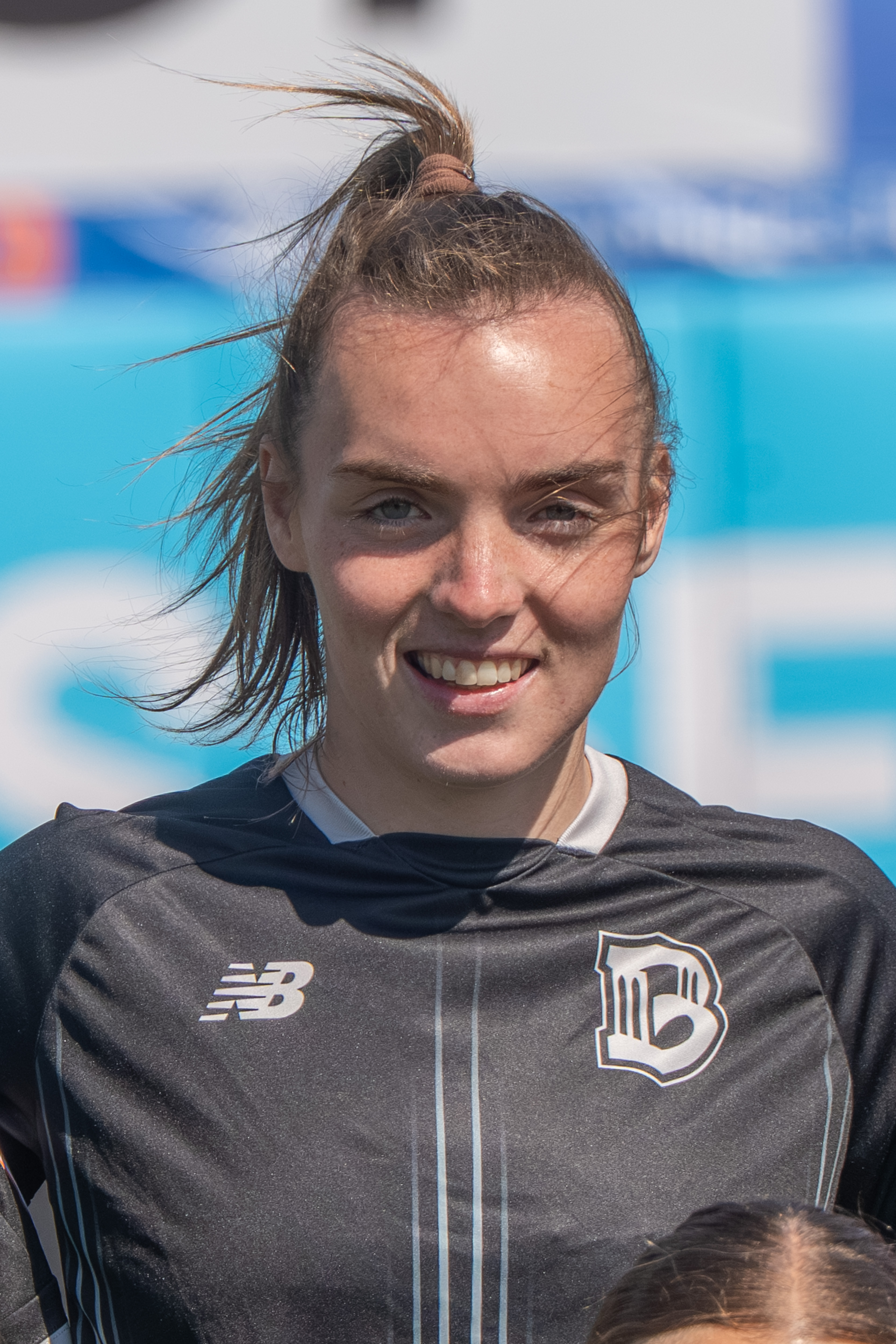
- Cooke with Brooklyn FC in 2026

Personal information
- Full name: Rebecca Ruth Cooke
- Date of birth: 30 October 2002 (age 23)
- Height: 5 ft 10 in (1.78 m)
- Position: Forward

Team information
- Current team: Brooklyn FC
- Number: 10

Youth career
- 2018–2019: Shelbourne

College career
Years	Team	Apps	(Gls)
2021–2022	Quinnipiac Bobcats	44	(39)
2023–2024	Penn State Nittany Lions	40	(6)

Senior career*
Years	Team	Apps	(Gls)
2019–2021	Shelbourne	22	(12)
2022	Bohemians	7	(3)
2025	Shelbourne	10	(4)
2025–	Brooklyn FC	26	(9)

International career
2018–2019	Republic of Ireland U-17	6	(1)
2019	Republic of Ireland U-19	4	(0)
- * Club domestic league appearances and goals as of 20:12, 17 May 2026 (UTC)

Rebecca Ruth Cooke (born 30 October 2002) is an Irish professional footballer who plays as a forward for USL Super League club Brooklyn FC. She played college soccer for the Quinnipiac Bobcats, where she led NCAA Division I in goals in 2022, and the Penn State Nittany Lions.

== Early life ==
Cooke grew up in Portmarnock, north of Dublin, the oldest of four children born to Martin and Sharon Cooke. She began playing football at an early age and was coached by her grandfather, Martin, on boys' teams until she was 12. She graduated from Portmarnock Community School.

== College career ==
Cooke joined the Quinnipiac Bobcats in the spring of 2021. In her brief freshman season (due to the COVID-19 pandemic), she led the team with four goals in seven games and was named the Metro Atlantic Athletic Conference (MAAC) Rookie of the Year. She was named first-team All-MAAC after scoring 13 goals in 18 games in the fall of 2021, her first full college season, and led the Bobcats to the MAAC tournament final.

Cooke scored 22 goals in 19 games in her junior season as she led the Bobcats to the MAAC regular-season and tournament titles in 2022, scoring twice in the conference final. This qualified the team for their first NCAA tournament since 2000, losing to Penn State in the first round. Her tally of 22 goals was the most in the NCAA Division I in 2022, and she was named first-team All-MAAC and third-team All-American. She then transferred to Penn State in 2023, where she played two seasons, appearing in 40 games primarily as a substitute and scoring six goals.

== Club career ==
=== Shelbourne and Bohemians ===
Cooke joined the first under-17 girls' team at Shelbourne F.C. in 2018, before making her senior debut the next year. She scored 14 goals in 24 first-team appearances over two seasons. Her "wonder goal" against Peamount United in the Women's National League was voted goal of the season for Shelbourne, men or women, in 2019.

When home for the summer during college, Cooke returned to play for Shelbourne in 2021, scoring 2 goals in 1 appearance, and played for Bohemians in 2022, scoring 3 goals in 7 games. After college, she again returned to Shelbourne in 2025, scoring 4 goals in 10 games.

=== Brooklyn FC ===
On 21 August 2025, USL Super League club Brooklyn FC announced that the club had signed Cooke before the league's second season. Cooke debuted for the club two days later, coming on as a second-half substitute for Jessica Garziano in Brooklyn's opening-day victory over Tampa Bay Sun FC and going on to make her first start for the team in a 1–1 draw with Spokane Zephyr FC at Maimonides Park on 3 September 2025. She scored the 80th-minute equalizer against DC Power FC in an 18 September league game at Audi Field, after Brooklyn came back from 2–0 down, while her second goal for the club came in the 90th minute of a 4 October game at Maimonides Park versus Sporting JAX only to see the visitors draw the game 3–3 with a 95th-minute equalizer. Cooke's performances throughout October earned her a spot on the USL Super League Team of the Month.

In July 2026, Brooklyn FC revealed that Cooke had sustained an ACL injury which would keep her from competing in the upcoming USLS fall season.

== International career ==
Cooke played for the Republic of Ireland's youth national team in 2019 UEFA Women's Under-17 Championship qualification, scoring in a 1–1 draw with Norway, and 2020 UEFA Women's Under-19 Championship qualification, though the latter was suspended midway due to the COVID-19 pandemic. She was first named to the senior squad for their friendly against Belgium in January 2019, although she was unused in the game.

== Career statistics ==
As of match played 12 April 2026

Appearances and goals by club, season and competition
Club	Season	League			Cup		Playoffs		Total	
Club	Season	Division	Apps	Goals	Apps	Goals	Apps	Goals	Apps	Goals
Shelbourne	2019	National League					—			
Shelbourne	2020	National League					—			
Shelbourne	2021	National League					—			
Shelbourne	2025	Premier Division					—			
Shelbourne	Total								32	16
Bohemians	2022	National League					—		7	3
Brooklyn F.C.	2025–26	USL Super League	23	9	0	0	—		23	9
Career total			23	9	0	0	0	0	63	28

== Honors and awards ==
Quinnipiac Bobcats

- Metro Atlantic Athletic Conference: 2022
- MAAC tournament: 2022

Individual

- USL Super League All-League Second Team: 2025–26
- Third-team All-American: 2022
- First-team All-MAAC: 2021, 2022
- NCAA Division I goals leader: 2022
