= Loudon Road =

Loudon Road may refer to:

- South Hampstead railway station, London, UK—known as Loudon Road between 1879 and 1922.
- Loudon Road Historic District, Albany County, New York, US.

== See also ==
- Loudoun Road, a street in London
