= Brenda Alemán =

Saudi footballer (born 2000)

Personal information
- Full name: Brenda María Alemán Mayoral
- Date of birth: 1 October 2000 (age 26)
- Place of birth: Ad Dammam, Saudi Arabia
- Height: 1.65 m (5 ft 5 in)
- Position: Defensive midfielder

College career
Years	Team	Apps	(Gls)
2019–2022	Mount St. Mary's Mountaineers	58	(0)

Senior career*
Years	Team	Apps	(Gls)
2023–2025	Xelajú		
2025–2026	Mazatlán	20	(0)
- * Club domestic league appearances and goals as of 9 February 2026

Brenda María Alemán Mayoral (born October 1, 2000) is a Saudi professional footballer who plays as a Defensive midfielder.

== Career ==
In 2023, she started her career in Xelajú. In 2025, she was transferred to Mazatlán.
