= Wheeler Home (Loudonville, New York) =

Historic house in New York, United States

- U.S. National Register of Historic Places
- Location within New York Location within the United States
- Location: 485 Loudon Rd., Loudonville, New York
- Coordinates: 42°42′46″N 73°45′11″W
- Area: 8.6 acres (3.5 ha)
- Built: 1920
- Architectural style: Colonial Revival, Georgian Revival
- MPS: New York State Route 9, Town of Colonie MRA
- NRHP reference No.: 79003241
- Added to NRHP: October 4, 1979

Wheeler Home is a historic home located at Loudonville in Albany County, New York. It was built about 1920 and is a two-story, five-bay, brick dwelling in the Georgian Revival style. It features a balustrade along the roofline and a portico supported by two columns.

It was listed on the National Register of Historic Places in 1979.
