= Bryan's Store =

Historic commercial building in New York, United States

- U.S. National Register of Historic Places
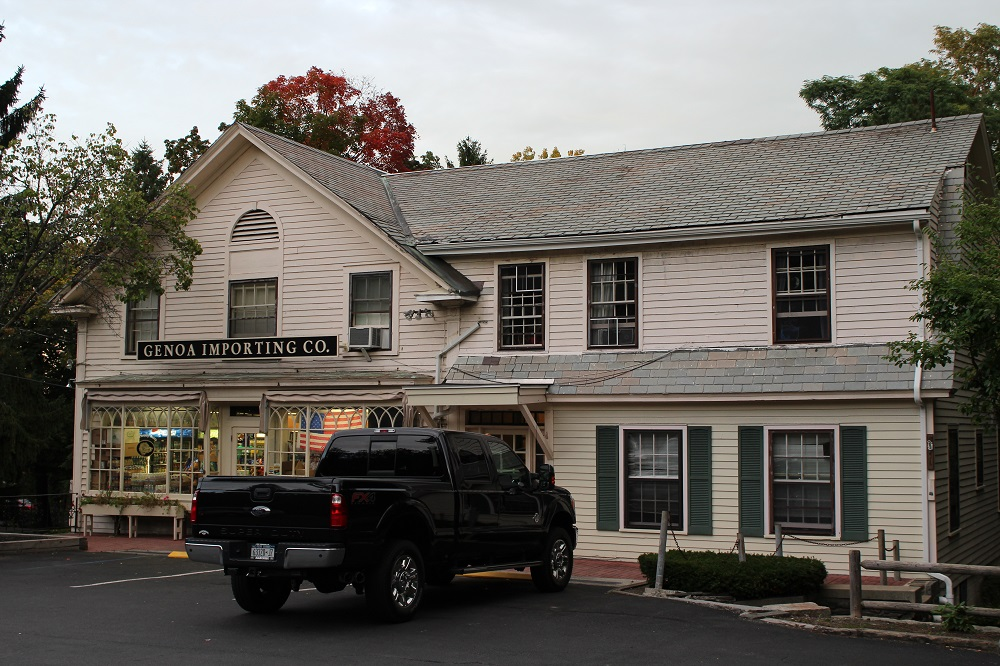

- Location within New York Location within the United States
- Location: 435 Loudon Rd., Loudonville, New York
- Coordinates: 42°42′20″N 73°45′17″W
- Area: 0.4 acres (0.16 ha)
- Built: 1862
- MPS: New York State Route 9, Town of Colonie MRA
- NRHP reference No.: 79003246
- Added to NRHP: October 4, 1979

Bryan's Store is a historic saloon and general store located at Loudonville in Albany County, New York.

== Description and history ==
It was built originally as a saloon and moved to its present location in 1862, after which it was converted for use as a store and post office. It is a two-story, frame building with a slate roof on a brick foundation.

It was listed on the National Register of Historic Places on October 4, 1979.
