= Gorham House =

Historic house in New York, United States

- U.S. National Register of Historic Places
- Location within New York Location within the United States
- Location: 347 Loudon Rd., Loudonville, New York
- Coordinates: 42°41′30″N 73°45′6″W
- Area: 5.8 acres (2.3 ha)
- Built: 1926
- Architect: Sturgis, Norman
- Architectural style: Colonial Revival
- MPS: New York State Route 9, Town of Colonie MRA
- NRHP reference No.: 79003239
- Added to NRHP: October 4, 1979

Gorham House, also known as Elliot House, is a historic home in Loudonville in Albany County, New York. It was built in 1926 and is a 2-story, five-bay Colonial Revival–style brick dwelling with flanking 1 1/2-story wings. It was built partially of recycled materials from the 1806 Hegeman house in Vischer Ferry, New York.

It was listed on the National Register of Historic Places in 1979.
