= Bill Maher (athletic director) =

Current position
- Title: Athletic director
- Team: Canisius
- Conference: MAAC

Biographical details
- Education: Canisius College

Playing career
- 1985–1989: Canisius

Administrative career (AD unless noted)
- 2001–2003: Buffalo (associate AD)
- 2003–2005: Buffalo (interim AD)
- 2005–present: Canisius

William Joseph Maher II is the current director of athletics for Canisius College. He previously served as interim athletics director of the University at Buffalo from 2003 to 2005. Maher played football at Canisius from 1985–1989, graduating in 1989 with a degree in physical education.
