= Whitney Mansion (Loudonville, New York) =

Historic house in New York, United States

- U.S. National Register of Historic Places
- Location within New York Location within the United States
- Location: 489 Loudon Rd., Loudonville, New York
- Coordinates: 42°42′51″N 73°45′13″W
- Area: 3.5 acres (1.4 ha)
- Built: 1840
- Architectural style: Colonial Revival, Georgian Revival
- MPS: New York State Route 9, Town of Colonie MRA
- NRHP reference No.: 79003242
- Added to NRHP: October 4, 1979

Whitney Mansion is a historic home located at Loudonville in Albany County, New York. It was originally built about 1840. In the early 20th century it had two large wings and other features added to create the appearance of a noteworthy Georgian Revival style mansion.

It was listed on the National Register of Historic Places in 1979.
