= Don Harnum =

American basketball coach and college athletics administrator

Current position
- Title: Athletic director
- Team: Rider
- Conference: MAAC

Biographical details
- Education: Susquehanna University, Trenton State College

Coaching career (HC unless noted)
- 1997–2005: Rider

Administrative career (AD unless noted)
- 2005–present: Rider

Head coaching record
- Overall: 126–103 (.550)

Accomplishments and honors

Awards
- MAAC Coach of the Year (2002)

Donald Harnum is an American basketball coach and college athletics administrator. Harnum served as head men's basketball coach at Rider University from 1997 to 2005, compiling a record of 126–103. After serving his tenure as basketball coach, Harnum was later named athletic director at Rider in 2005.

== Head coaching record ==
Record table
Season	Team	Overall	Conference	Standing	Postseason
Rider Broncs (Metro Atlantic Athletic Conference) (1997–2005)
1997–98	Rider	18–10	12–6	2nd	1998 NIT First Round
1998–99	Rider	12–16	7–11	T–7th	
1999–00	Rider	16–14	8–10	T–7th	
2000–01	Rider	16–12	11–7	T–4th	
2001–02	Rider	17–11	13–5	T–1st	
2002–03	Rider	12–15	7–11	7th	
2003–04	Rider	17–14	10–8	5th	
2004–05	Rider	18–11	13–5	T–1st	
Rider:		126–103 (.550)	81–63 (.563)		
Total:		126–103 (.550)			
National champion Postseason invitational champion Conference regular season champion Conference regular season and conference tournament champion Division regular season champion Division regular season and conference tournament champion Conference tournament champion
