= D. D. T. Moore Farmhouse =

Historic house in New York, United States

- U.S. National Register of Historic Places
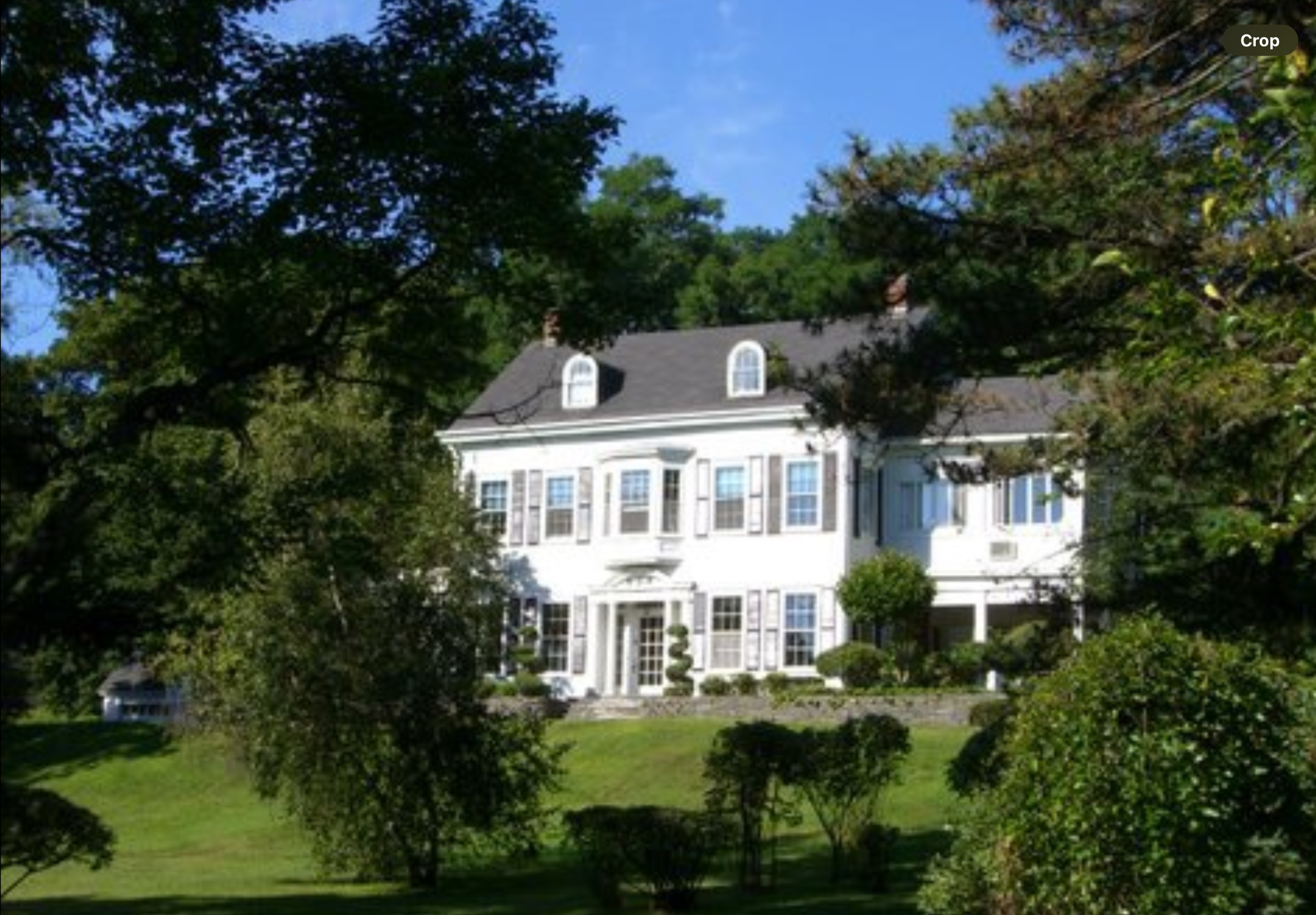
- D. D. T. Moore Farmhouse in 2025

- Location within New York Location within the United States
- Location: 352 Loudon Rd. Loudonville, New York
- Coordinates: 42°41′36″N 73°45′20″W
- Area: 2.4 acres (0.97 ha)
- Built: 1850
- Architectural style: Colonial
- MPS: New York State Route 9, Town of Colonie MRA
- NRHP reference No.: 79003244
- Added to NRHP: October 4, 1979

The D. D. T. Moore Farmhouse is a historic home located in Loudonville, Albany County, New York. Built in 1850, it is a 2 1/2-story frame dwelling designed in a style that incorporates Colonial and Greek Revival elements. The home underwent renovations in the 1890s, which included the addition of porches.

The property was established by Daniel D. Tompkins Moore, a renowned abolitionist, investor, and superintendent of the West Albany stockyards. Purchased as a 52-acre parcel in 1845, the farm, known as Middlebrook State Premium Farm Peach Orchard, was awarded the title of "Best Farm in New York State" in 1851. At its peak, the farm expanded to 2,500 acres, encompassing an area later occupied by the Corporate Woods office park. Following Moore's death in 1858, portions of the property were sold in 1860 to prominent Loudonville families, including the Osbornes, Aspinwalls, and the Rosses.

The house was later sold to William and Sarah Sprague, and it remained in their family until 1920. It was then purchased by the Leslie family of the Leslie Credit Company. As the surrounding land was sold off, the property transitioned from a working farm to an estate. In 1950, the home was purchased by the family of Daniel McNamee, who was well known in Albany's stock brokerage and social circles.

Attorneys Charles Roemmelt and Dale Pager became the stewards of the property in 1980. In recognition of its historical importance, the D. D. T. Moore Farmhouse was listed on the National Register of Historical Places on October 4, 1979. The house stands on the corner of Leslie Court and Route 9 in Loudonville, NY. Its remaining grounds include wooded areas with native Eastern Hemlock, red maple, Elm, and American Beech trees.

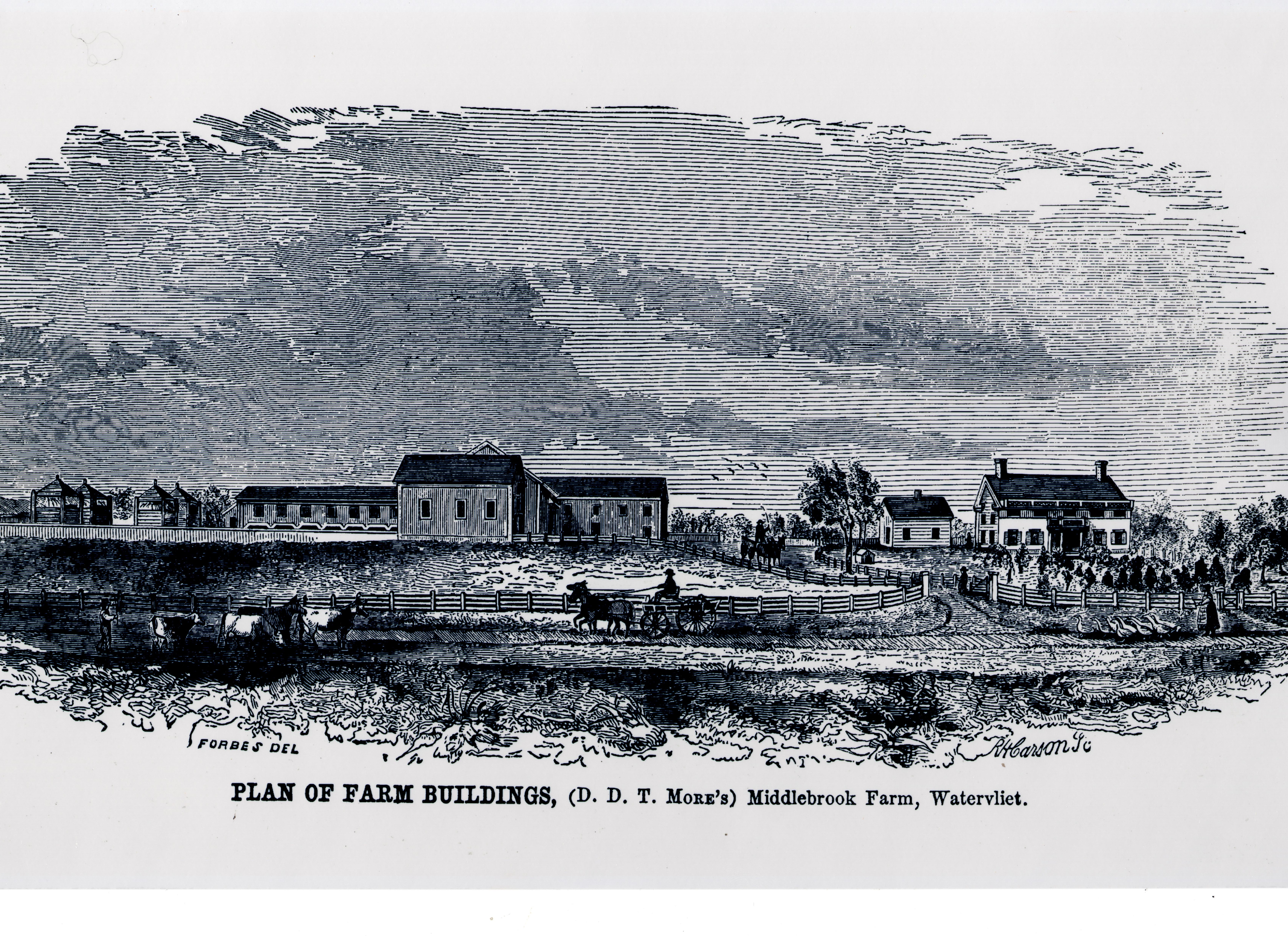
Historic Photo of D.D.T. Moore Homestead
