= Springwood Manor =

Historic house in New York, United States

- U.S. National Register of Historic Places
- Location within New York Location within the United States
- Location: 498 Loudon Rd., Loudonville, New York
- Coordinates: 42°42′50″N 73°45′26″W
- Area: 5.8 acres (2.3 ha)
- Built: 1890
- Architect: Klinger, Henry D.
- Architectural style: Colonial Revival
- MPS: New York State Route 9, Town of Colonie MRA
- NRHP reference No.: 79003243
- Added to NRHP: October 4, 1979

Springwood Manor is a historic home located at Loudonville in Albany County, New York. It was originally built about 1890 and is a 2 1/2-story, five-bay, masonry dwelling with a mansard roof. It was extensively remodeled in 1912 in the Colonial Revival style. Also on the property are a barn, carriage house, shed, and gardens with a spring fed pond (all non-contributing).

It was listed on the National Register of Historic Places in 1979.
