= Hughson Mansion =

Historic house in New York, United States

- U.S. National Register of Historic Places
- Location within New York Location within the United States
- Location: 374 Loudon Rd., Loudonville, New York
- Coordinates: 42°41′45″N 73°45′19″W
- Area: less than one acre
- Architectural style: Second Empire
- MPS: New York State Route 9, Town of Colonie MRA
- NRHP reference No.: 79003245
- Added to NRHP: October 4, 1979

Hughson Mansion was a historic home located in the Hamlet of Loudonville, Town of Colonie, County of Albany, State of New York. It was built between approximately 1866 and 1883 and was a large 2 1/2-story Second Empire style frame dwelling. It featured a mansard roof with dormers, bracketed cornice, and window surrounds with Baroque details.

The mansion was listed on the National Register of Historic Places in 1979.

In the summer of 1953, the mansion was gifted by Mrs. Frank Hughson to Loudonville Community Church. Loudonville Community Church used the mansion to conduct services and Sunday school until 1959, when a new sanctuary was built adjacent to the mansion. From 1959 until the early 2000s, the mansion was used for Sunday school. The mansion was demolished to make way for Loudonville Community Church's new sanctuary, which was completed in June 2002.
