= Hughson (surname) =

Hughson is a surname. Notable people with the surname include:

- Fred Hughson (1914–1987), Australian rules footballer
- Jim Hughson (born 1956), Canadian television sportscaster
- Les Hughson (1907–1985), Australian rules footballer
- Nathaniel Hughson (1755–1837), American city founder
- Tex Hughson (1916–1993), American baseball player
