= Loudon Road Historic District =

Historic district in New York, United States

- U.S. National Register of Historic Places
- U.S. Historic district
- Location within New York Location within the United States
- Location: Loudon Rd. from Crumite Rd. to Menands Rd., Loudonville, New York
- Coordinates: 42°42′2″N 73°45′17″W
- Area: 36 acres (15 ha)
- MPS: New York State Route 9, Town of Colonie MRA
- NRHP reference No.: 79003247
- Added to NRHP: October 4, 1979

Loudon Road Historic District is a national historic district located at Loudonville in Albany County, New York. It includes 20 contributing buildings; 17 are residences and three are in commercial use. The district encompasses representative structures from the areas growth during the 19th and early 20th century. Notable structures include the home of Elias Ireland (ca. 1820), an early school from 1811 that was rebuilt about 1850, summer cottages from the late 19th century including that of Judge Ira Harris, and Georgian Revival homes from the early 20th century.

It was listed on the National Register of Historic Places in 1979.
