= Loudonville, New York =

- Hamlet and CDP
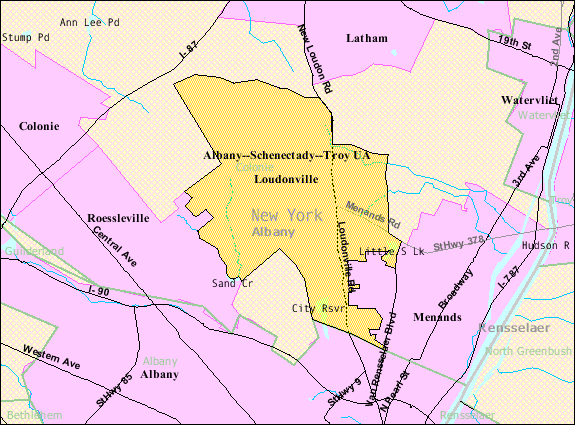
- Loudonville census-designated place (CDP) in 1990
- Etymology: For John Campbell, 4th Earl of Loudoun
- Location within New York Location within the United States
- Coordinates: 42°42′17″N 73°45′17″W
- Country: United States
- State: New York
- Region: Capital District
- County: Albany
- Town: Colonie
- Settled: 1830

Area
  - Total: 5.03 sq mi (13.0 km^{2})
  - Land: 4.96 sq mi (12.8 km^{2})
  - Water: 0.07 sq mi (0.18 km^{2})
- Elevation: 348 ft (106 m)

Population (2020)
  - Total: 10,296
  - Density: 2,080/sq mi (801/km^{2})
- Time zone: UTC-5 (EST)
  - Summer (DST): UTC-4 (EDT)
- ZIP Codes: 12211 (Loudonville); 12205 (Colonie); 12110 (Latham)
- Area code: 518

Loudonville is a hamlet in the town of Colonie, in Albany County, New York, United States. Loudonville was a census-designated place (CDP) in the 1970, 1980, and 1990 US Census. It ceased to be a CDP in the 2000 Census, but regained its status in 2020.

== History ==
Loudonville Historical Populations
| Year | Pop. | ±% |
|---|---|---|
| 1970 | 9,299 | — |
| 1980 | 11,480 | +23.5% |
| 1990 | 10,822 | −5.7% |
| 2020 | 10,296 | −4.9% |
Sources: Censuses 1970 and 1980; and 1990.

The hamlet is named after John Campbell, 4th Earl of Loudoun and was originally a 19th-century summer resort for some of Albany's wealthiest residents. Loudon Road, known as Old Plank Road in the early 19th century, is lined with several historic Jeffersonian mansions. Loudonville started as a hamlet on Loudon Road (originally a plank road), at the intersection of Crumitie Road. Ireland's Corners was a separate hamlet to the north at the intersection of Loudon Road and Menand/Osborne Road, with a post office. Ireland's Corners is named for Elias H. Ireland who in 1832 bought the heavily wooded area from the Patroon, Stephen Van Rensselaer. In 1871 the post office at Ireland's Corners was renamed Loudonville.

== Geography ==
The community is located directly north of Albany and south of Newtonville. The hamlet is centered on the original Ireland's Corners, the intersection of U.S. Route 9 with Osborne Road (County Route 154)/Menand Road (NY Route 378) (west bound name/east bound names respectively), with the northwestern corner bisected by Old Niskayuna Road (County Route 152). Though as a hamlet, it has poorly defined borders, the census designated place of Loudonville had concrete borders.

=== Landmarks ===
- Siena University: A private Roman Catholic College (Franciscan)
- Schuyler Meadows Club: The club was founded in 1926 by residents of Loudonville who did not wish to travel to the Albany Country Club, which at the time was located at the current site of the uptown campus of the University at Albany, SUNY. The clubhouse, built in 1927, is modeled on the central portion of George Washington's Mount Vernon home.
- Bryan's Store, D. D. T. Moore Farmhouse, Gorham House, Hughson Mansion, Loudon Road Historic District, Springwood Manor, Wheeler Home, Holub Home, Friend Humphrey House, and Whitney Mansion are listed on the National Register of Historic Places.
- Hickey Field: Hickey Field is a lacrosse and soccer stadium which has served as the home of the Siena Saints men's lacrosse, women's lacrosse, men's soccer, and women's soccer teams. It opened in December 2006. The first varsity sporting event held at Hickey Field was a March 10, 2007 Siena Saints men's lacrosse 15–2 win over Merrimack College. In 2019, the field was officially named after alumnus Douglas Hickey.

== Demographics ==
=== 2020 census ===
Loudonville ceased to be a CDP in the 2000 Census, but regained its status in 2020.

As of the 2020 census, Loudonville had a population of 10,296. The median age was 48.6 years. 18.8% of residents were under the age of 18 and 24.3% of residents were 65 years of age or older. For every 100 females there were 95.6 males, and for every 100 females age 18 and over there were 92.1 males age 18 and over.

100.0% of residents lived in urban areas, while 0.0% lived in rural areas.

There were 4,114 households in Loudonville, of which 25.4% had children under the age of 18 living in them. Of all households, 58.1% were married-couple households, 12.5% were households with a male householder and no spouse or partner present, and 23.6% were households with a female householder and no spouse or partner present. About 24.3% of all households were made up of individuals and 13.2% had someone living alone who was 65 years of age or older.

There were 4,331 housing units, of which 5.0% were vacant. The homeowner vacancy rate was 1.5% and the rental vacancy rate was 5.9%.

Racial composition as of the 2020 census
| Race | Number | Percent |
|---|---|---|
| White | 8,475 | 82.3% |
| Black or African American | 347 | 3.4% |
| American Indian and Alaska Native | 14 | 0.1% |
| Asian | 741 | 7.2% |
| Native Hawaiian and Other Pacific Islander | 1 | 0.0% |
| Some other race | 122 | 1.2% |
| Two or more races | 596 | 5.8% |
| Hispanic or Latino (of any race) | 413 | 4.0% |

== Notable people ==
- Roger McNamee, venture capital and private equity investor, founder of Elevation Partners and Silver Lake Partners, grew up in Loudonville
- Henry Reed Rathbone, present at Lincoln's assassination, lived on Cherry Tree Rd.
- Joan Vollmer, beatnik and common-law wife of William S. Burroughs
- James H. Fallon, American neuroscientist and author
- David Ball, former bishop of the Episcopalian Diocese of Albany
- Kevin M. Warsh, Chairman of the Federal Reserve Bank of the United States
- Paige DeSorbo, television personality, podcaster, and New York Times best-selling author

== See also ==
- Watervliet (town), New York
