= Mount St. Mary's Mountaineers women's soccer =

American college soccer team

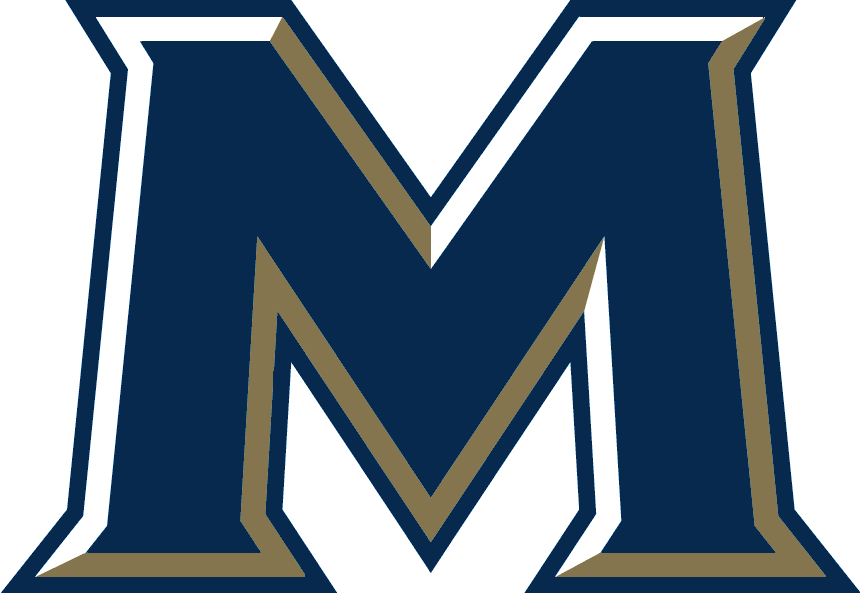
- University: Mount St. Mary's University
- Head coach: Melissa Sherwood (3rd season)
- Conference: MAAC
- Location: Emmitsburg, Maryland, US
- Stadium: Waldron Family Stadium (capacity: 1,000)
- Nickname: Mountaineers, The Mount
- Colors: Blue and white
Home	Away

The Mount St. Mary's Mountaineers women's soccer team represents Mount St. Mary's University in the Metro Atlantic Athletic Conference of NCAA Division I college soccer.

== Players ==
2021 Women's Soccer Roster

1 Drew Camp GK Fr. 5-8 Kintnersville, Pa. / Palisades
3 Cheyenna Cook D Sr. 5-5 Bridgewater, N.J. / Bridgewater-Raritan
7 Kalli Bell M Jr. 5-5 Baltimore, Md. / Sparrows Point
8 Alexa Dragisics F So. 5-3 Ellicott City, Md. / Mount Hebron
10 Madison Bee F Jr. 5-10 Haddonfield, N.J. / Haddonfield
11 Daniella DiBiase F So. 5-3 East Hanover, N.J. / DePaul Catholic
12 Arden Lembryk GK So. 5-5 Wayne, N.J. / Wayne Valley
13 Kayley Kocent M So. 5-3 Baltimore, Md. / Sparrows Point
15 Brenda Aleman D Jr. 5-5 Derwood, Md. / St.John's College
16 Isabella Wendler F So. 5-6 Manheim, Pa. / Manheim Central
19 Mikayla Bates M Jr. 5-4 Easton, Pa. / Notre Dame
20 Emily Streett D Fr. 5-5 Sykesville, Md. / Century
21 Lindsay Reightler F Jr. 5-5 Schnecksville, Pa. / Parkland
22 Hannah Cooksey F Jr. 5-3 Pennsville, N.J. / Pennsville
23 Madi Stanchina D Jr. 5-7 Easton, Pa. / Easton
24 Kayla Pennington D So. 5-5 Reading, Pa. / Wilson
25 Isabella Roberts F Sr. 5-1 Anchorage, Alaska / West
26 Liliana Vargas D So. 5-3 Lexington, Va. / Rockbridge County
28 Alex Piccinich D Jr. 5-4 Freehold, N.J. / Howell
32 Kelsey White F Fr. 5-7 Northfield, N.J. / Ocean City

== Personnel ==
=== Current technical staff ===
Position	Staff
Head Coach	Melissa Sherwood
Assistant Coach	
Assistant Coach	Tori Krause
Assistant Coach	Bonnie Young
Director of Athletics	Lynne Robinson

Last updated: August 30, 2017
Source: Mount St. Mary's University Athletics

=== Coaching history ===
Dates	Head coach
1992–1993	Regina Gebhart
1994–1996	Wayne Sanchez
1997	Laura Johnston
1998–2006	Paul Wood
2007–2015	Tom Gosselin
2016–2017	Joe Nemzer
2018–2021	Tori Krause

== Awards ==
=== First Team All-Conference ===
- (United States) Anna Lebo (2007)
- (United States) Anna Lebo (2006)
- (United States) Keli Stevens (2003)
- (United States) Keli Stevens (2002)
- Nicki Trumpler (1998)
- Amanda Gilbert (1997)

=== Second Team All-Conference ===
- (United States) Karyn Farrar (2008)
- (United States) Margaret Pyzik (2004)
- (United States) Robin Coveleski (1999)
- (United States) Robin Coveleski (1998)
- Amanda Gilbert (1998)
