= Rider Broncs =

Athletic teams of Rider University, New Jersey

- University: Rider University
- Nickname: Broncs
- NCAA: Division I
- Conference: Metro Conference (primary); NEC (field hockey); MAC (wrestling)
- Athletic director: Don Harnum
- Location: Lawrenceville, New Jersey
- Varsity teams: 18
- Basketball arena: Canastra Hammer Arena
- Baseball stadium: Sonny Pittaro Field
- Colors: Cranberry, white, and gray
- Mascot: AJ the Bronc
- Website: gobroncs.com
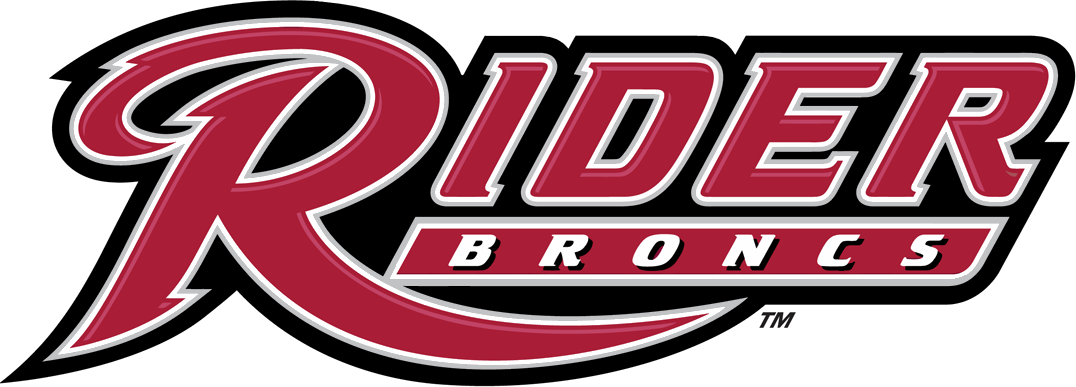

The Rider Broncs are the athletic teams of Rider University, a private nonsectarian university in Lawrenceville, New Jersey, United States. The school is a Division I member of the National Collegiate Athletic Association (NCAA), and its athletes compete in the Metro Conference. For wrestling only, Rider is an affiliate member of the Mid-American Conference (MAC).

The intercollegiate sports program at Rider was started by coach Clair Bee in the 1920s. Two of the school's most famous athletic alumni are former Notre Dame basketball coach and current ESPN sportscaster Digger Phelps, who played basketball at Rider from 1959 to 1963 and Jason Thompson who played basketball at Rider from 2004 to 2008 and was drafted by the Sacramento Kings with the 12th pick of the 2008 NBA Draft.

== Varsity sports ==
Men's sports	Women's sports
Baseball	Basketball
Basketball	Cross country
Cross country	Field hockey
Golf	Lacrosse
Soccer	Soccer
Swimming	Softball
Tennis	Swimming
Track and field	Tennis
Wrestling	Track and field
	Volleyball

=== Baseball ===
See footnote The baseball team has won four Metro Conference championships (2008, 2010, 2021, 2023), three NEC titles (1994, 1995, 1996), and six ECC titles (1984-1987, 1989, 1992) and participated in 15 NCAA Regional Tournaments and one College World Series (1967). The baseball team plays its home games at Sonny Pittaro Field on campus. Rider has seen nine of its players play in MLB, with the most recent being Nick Margevicius with the Seattle Mariners in 2021.

=== Men's basketball ===
The Broncs have made three NCAA Tournament appearances in 1984, 1993, and 1994. In total, Rider has appeared in postseason competition 10 times across its history as a Division I team, with the most recent being an appearance in the 2018 NIT. Two players have been drafted and played in the NBA: Herb Krautblatt in 1948 as a sixth round pick of the Baltimore Bullets and Jason Thompson as the 12th overall selection of the 2008 NBA Draft by the Sacramento Kings. Thompson played seven seasons in Sacramento before spending an eighth with the Golden State Warriors and Toronto Raptors. As of the 2023-24 season, 11 former Broncs currently play professionally between Europe, Japan, and the G-League.

=== Women's basketball ===
Rider's women's basketball team has made the WNIT twice (2017, 2019) and finished as the #1 seed in the MAAC (now the Metro Conference) in 2019-2020. Stella Johnson became the first Lady Bronc to score 2,000 points on February 20, 2020 against Quinnipiac. She was drafted in the 3rd round of the 2020 WNBA draft by the Phoenix Mercury, with the 29th overall pick. She was waived by the Mercury before the start of the season, but was signed by the Chicago Sky on June 29, 2020.[4] On July 28, she made her WNBA debut in a win over the Los Angeles Sparks.[5] Johnson's #4 jersey became the first in team history to be retired by Rider on November 7, 2022.

=== Women's field hockey ===
The field hockey team has competed in the NEC since 2021, where the Broncs have won eight titles (2000, 2002, 2004, 2010-2012, 2020*, 2022), played in six NCAA Play-In games and two NCAA Tournaments (2020*, 2022). *2020 season was played in spring 2021 due to COVID-19 pandemic.

=== Men's golf ===
Austin Devereux won the individual title at the 2021 & 2022 MAAC (now Metro Conference) Championships, becoming the first Rider golfer to compete in the NCAA Championships since 1964. The 2022 team won the school's first MAAC golf title on April 24, 2022 at Walt Disney World's Magnolia course.

=== Women's lacrosse ===
The women's lacrosse team will begin competition in spring 2024. Former FDU-Florham coach Evan Mager was hired as the first head coach on October 19, 2022.

=== Men's soccer ===
The Men's Soccer team has won one NEC Championship (1992) and six Metro Conference Championships (1997, 1998, 2015, 2016, 2018, 2023) and participated in six NCAA tournaments.

=== Women's soccer ===
The women's soccer team has won one Metro Conference title (2014) and participated in one NCAA Tournament (2014).

=== Women's softball ===
The softball team has won one NEC Championship (1997), one Metro Conference Championship (2003) and participated in two NCAA tournaments (1997, 2003).

=== Men's swimming and diving ===
The men's swimming and diving team has won 12 Metro Conference Championships (2004, 2012-2023) and had won eleven titles in a row through the 2022-23 season.

=== Women's swimming and diving ===
The women's swimming and diving team has won three Metro Conference Championships (2001, 2003, 2009).

=== Men's track and field ===
Men's track and field has won three Metro Conference Indoor Championships (2017, 2023, 2024) and four Metro Conference Outdoor Championships (2004, 2011, 2013, 2023) and is currently coached by Penn State All-American Bob Hamer (Penn State).

=== Women's track and field ===
The women's track and field team has won four Metro Conference Indoor Championships (2007, 2020, 2023, 2024) and four Metro Conference Outdoor Championships (2004, 2007, 2013, 2023).

=== Women's volleyball ===
The women's volleyball team has won three NEC championships (1994–96), one Metro Conference Championship (2020*) and played in four NCAA Championships (1994–96, 2020*). They have won one match (1994 vs. Army). *2020 season was played in spring 2021 due to COVID-19 pandemic

=== Men's wrestling ===
Rider wrestling practices in a 3,600 square foot mat room on the top floor of the Canastra Health & Sports Center while home meets are held in Alumni Gym, which seats 1,650. In 2013, Rider left the CAA as an associate member shortly after the CAA announced that it would no longer sponsor wrestling and joined the Eastern Wrestling League. On March 5, 2019 it was announced that Rider along with the other six members of the EWL would be joining the Mid-American Conference as affiliate members starting in academic year 2019-2020, making the MAC the second largest conference in Division I Wrestling. The Broncs have at least won a share of the MAC East Division in all three seasons (2022, 2023 with Lock Haven, and 2024). The Broncs went undefeated in the conference (8-0) for the first time in 2023-24.

Rider Broncs Wrestling has gained national recognition by longtime head coach Gary Taylor, who retired after the 2016-17 season. Former Rider All-American John Hangey was named his replacement. The Broncs have had 19 individual All-American wrestlers, including four in Taylor's last three seasons. Jesse Dellavecchia finished runner-up at 157 in the 2021 NCAA Championships. Recently, Ethan Laird finished 6th at 197 in the 2023 NCAA Championships.

== Athletics Hall of Fame ==
For an alphabetical list of inductees, see footnote As of March 25, 2023, there are 133 members in the Rider University Athletics Hall of Fame. The first inductions were in October 1990.

== See also ==
- List of college athletic programs in New Jersey
