= Siena Saints =

- University: Siena University (New York)
- Conference: MAAC
- NCAA: Division I
- Athletic director: John D'Argenio
- Location: Loudonville, New York
- Varsity teams: 21
- Basketball arena: MVP Arena
- Baseball stadium: Connors Park
- Other venues: UHY Center
- Mascot: Bernie "Saint" Bernard (St. Bernard Dog)
- Nickname: Saints
- Fight song: When the Saints Go Marching In "S-I-E-N-A"
- Colors: Green and gold
- Website: sienasaints.com
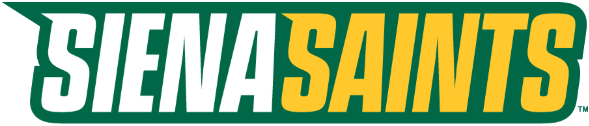

The Siena Saints (formerly the Siena Indians) are composed of 21 teams representing Siena University (New York) in collegiate sports. The Saints compete in the NCAA Division I and are members of the Metro Atlantic Athletic Conference. They changed their name prior to the 1988-89 season.

== Sponsored teams ==
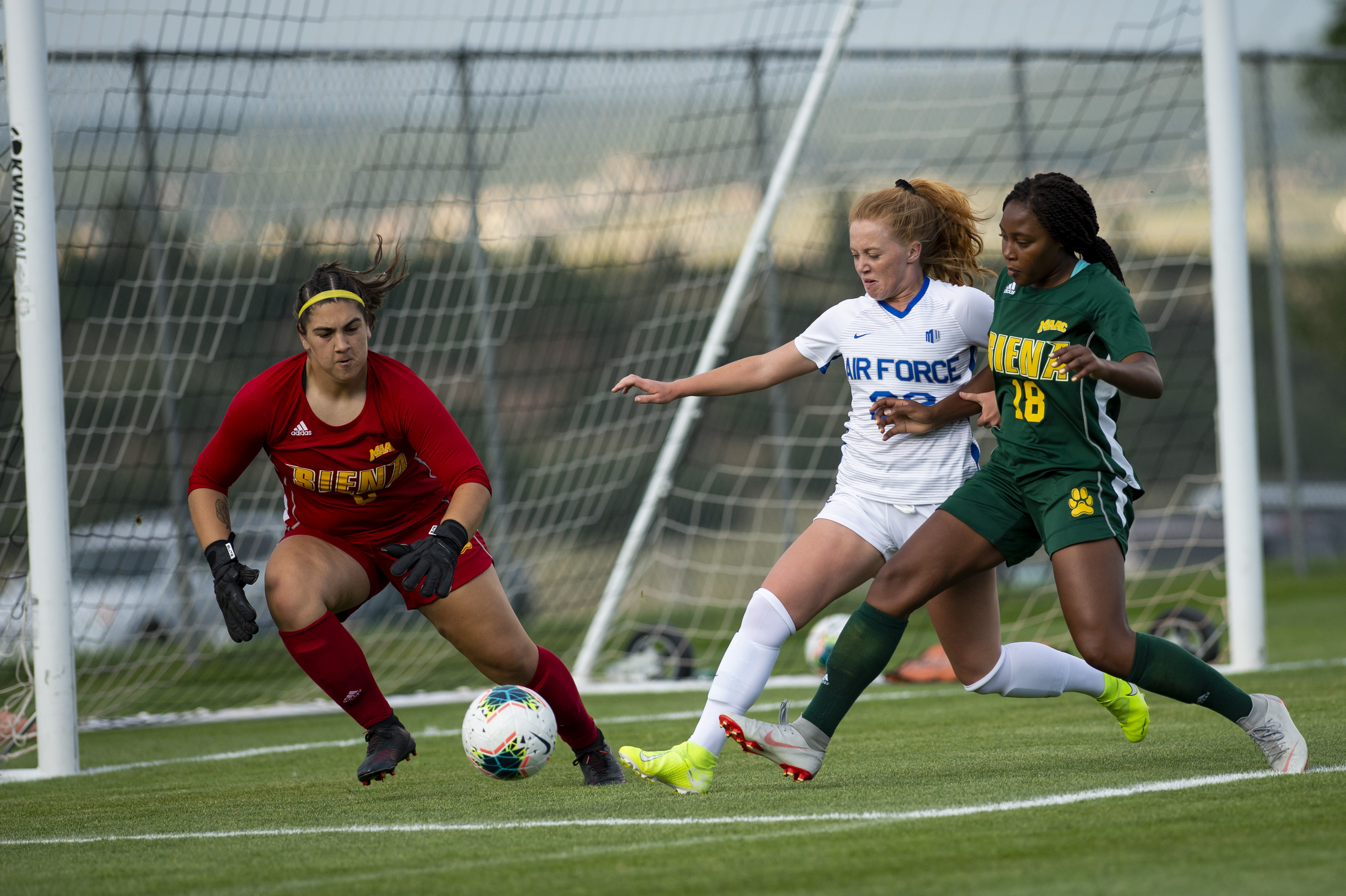
A Saints women's soccer match against Air Force in 2019

Men's sports	Women's sports
Basketball	Basketball
Baseball	Golf
Golf	Lacrosse
Lacrosse	Rugby
Rugby	Soccer
Soccer	Softball
Tennis	Swimming
Track and field	Tennis
	Track and field
	Volleyball
	Water Polo

== Discontinued teams ==
The Siena Saints football program ran from 1965 to 2003.

Siena carried field hockey, which was discontinued following the 2017 season.
