= Canisius Golden Griffins =

Intercollegiate sports teams of Canisius University

- University: Canisius University
- Conference: Metro Atlantic Athletic Conference (primary); Atlantic Hockey America (men's ice hockey)
- NCAA: Division I
- Athletic director: Bill Maher
- Location: Buffalo, New York
- Varsity teams: 16
- Basketball arena: Koessler Athletic Center
- Baseball stadium: Demske Sports Complex
- Other venues: LECOM Harborcenter
- Mascot: Petey
- Nickname: Golden Griffins
- Colors: Blue and gold
- Website: gogriffs.com
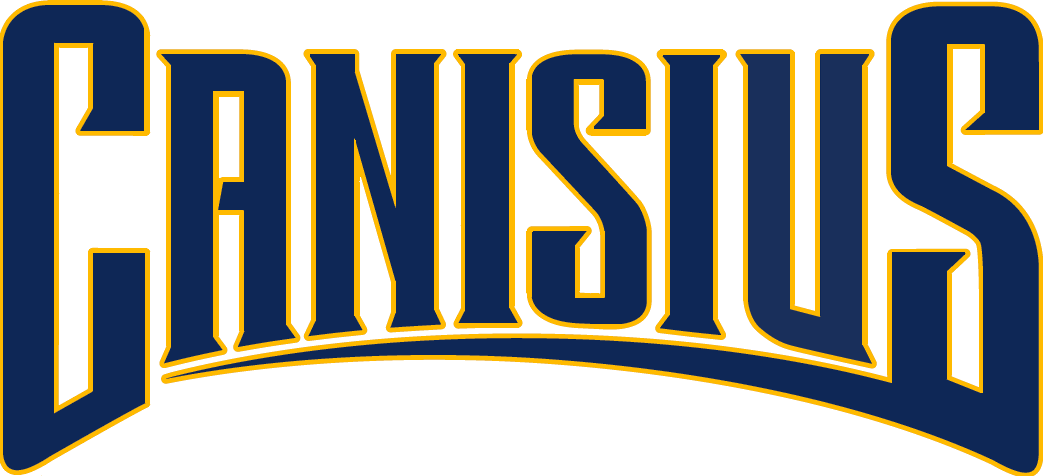

The Canisius University Golden Griffins are composed of 16 teams representing Canisius University in intercollegiate athletics. These teams include men's and women's basketball, cross country, track, lacrosse, soccer, and swimming and diving. Men's sports include baseball, ice hockey, and golf. Women's sports include volleyball, soccer, and softball. The Golden Griffins compete in the NCAA Division I and are members of the Metro Atlantic Athletic Conference (MAAC) for most sports, excluding men's ice hockey which competes in Atlantic Hockey.

== Sports sponsored ==
Men's sports	Women's sports
Baseball	Basketball
Basketball	Cross country
Cross country	Lacrosse
Golf	Rowing
Ice hockey	Soccer
Lacrosse	Softball
Soccer	Swimming and diving
Swimming and diving	Track and field^{†}
Track and field^{†}	Volleyball
† – Track and field includes both indoor and outdoor

=== Baseball ===
In 2008, the men's baseball team won the regular season MAAC championship for the first time in its history with a 41–13 record. This broke the school record for wins in a single season. One season later, the team advanced to its first MAAC Championship game in program history.

=== Men's basketball ===
The Canisius men's basketball team has made four appearances in the NCAA Division I men's basketball tournament, the last appearance coming in 1996.

=== Ice hockey ===
The Canisius men's ice hockey team has made two appearance in the NCAA Division I Men's Ice Hockey Tournament, in 2013 and 2023.

=== Men's lacrosse ===
In 2008, Canisius men's lacrosse won the MAAC tournament and earned its first ever bid to the NCAA Men's Lacrosse Championship tournament.

Canisius again won the MAAC championship in 2012. Sitting at 2–7, The Griffs would win their final 2 regular season games to advance to the MAAC championship as the 3 seed. From there Canisius would avenge regular season losses to Detroit 12–10 and Siena 10–9 en route to their 2nd MAAC Championship and automatic qualifier. The Griffs would eventually fall to 2012 NCAA champion Loyola. In 2018 the Griffins would win the MAAC tournament after entering as a number 4 seed and get an autobid to the NCAA Tournament. The Griffins would fall to Robert Morris in the NCAA Tournament Play-in game by a score of 12–6.

=== Women's lacrosse ===
Canisius has sponsored women's lacrosse since 1999. After just 10 wins in its first four seasons, Scott Teeter took the reins of the program beginning with the 2003 season and eventually turned it into a contender in the MAAC. After just one win in his first two seasons, the Griffs went 9–6 (4–3 MAAC) in Teeter's third season and advanced to the MAAC championship game in 2006. After three straight conference semifinal appearances between 2008 and 2010, the Griffs won the MAAC championship in 2011, kicking off a stretch of six NCAA appearances in a span of seven years. In 2017, Erica Evans was named a Tewaaraton Award semifinalist, the first in the program's history.

=== Softball ===
The softball team has traditionally been the university's most successful sport, qualifying for the NCAA Tournament twelve times since the 1994 season (including four straight times from 1994 to 1997) and winning sixteen MAAC regular-season championships. Its most recent trip to the NCAA tournament was in 2022.

== Former sports ==
=== Football ===
Canisius sponsored football intermittently from 1918 to 2002.

=== Wrestling ===
The Golden Griffins had club wrestling for two years before starting a varsity team in 1970–71. Coached by Charles Mann, the Griffs compiled a losing record of 0–7. The following year, the team was dropped after the first dual meet due to "lack of student participation."

=== Synchronized swimming ===
The Canisius synchronized swimming team began as a club team in 1992, before being elevated to a varsity team one year later, in 1993. Canisius re-classified the synchronized swimming team back to the club level following the conclusion of the 2014 season, after the NCAA dropped the sport from its Emerging Sports classification. The Canisius synchronized swim team had been the 3rd place team in the nation since 2008, fielding several national champions in several categories each year. The team had been ECAC champions since 1996.

==== Synchronized swimming head coaches ====
- Joanne Wright, 1993–2004
- Stacy Leiker, 2004–2006
- Jill Wright, 2006–2014

== Rivalries ==
Canisius won the Canal Cup in 2008 and 2009. The cup commemorates the athletic rivalry between Canisius College and Niagara University. Canisius has won the trophy two times in the Canal Cup's three-year existence.

Both Canisius and Niagara maintain rivalries with the other two Division I universities in western New York. The joint rivalry between the two and Saint Bonaventure University is known as the Little Three. The four-way rivalry between those three schools and the State University of New York at Buffalo (the only public, non-Catholic Division I school in the region) is known as the Big 4. (Of note, in men's basketball, both its current coach, former Buffalo coach Reggie Witherspoon, and his most recent predecessor, former Saint Bonaventure coach Jim Baron, previously coached at other Big 4 schools before joining Canisius.)

== Mascot ==
Canisius' mascot is the Golden Griffin. The college adopted it in 1932, after Charles A. Brady ('33) wrote a story in a Canisius publication honoring Buffalo's centennial year as a city. Brady wrote about Rene-Robert LaSalle's Le Griffon, the first European ship to sail the upper Great Lakes, built here in Buffalo. The name stuck, and Canisius' mascot was born.

According to GoGriffs.com, the griffin is a "mythical creature of supposed gigantic size that has the head, forelegs and wings of an eagle and the hindquarters, tail and ears of a lion." It represents values such as strength, vigilance, and intelligence, all of which befit a college and qualities that one would look for in students and athletes alike.

== Pro-football venue ==
Canisius was also the home field of the Buffalo All-Americans of the early National Football League. Around 1917, Buffalo manager, Barney Lepper, signed a lease for the team to play their home games at Canisius College. The All-Americans played several of their games at Canisius before relocating to Bison Stadium in 1924.
