= Quinnipiac Bobcats =

Collegiate sports teams of Quinnipiac University

- University: Quinnipiac University
- Nickname: Bobcats
- NCAA: Division I
- Conference: The Metro (primary); ECAC (ice hockey); NEC (field hockey); NIRA (women's rugby); NCATA (acrobatics and tumbling)
- Athletic director: Greg Amodio
- Location: Hamden, Connecticut
- Varsity teams: 21
- Basketball arena: M&T Bank Arena
- Ice hockey arena: M&T Bank Arena
- Baseball stadium: Quinnipiac Baseball Field
- Soccer stadium: Quinnipiac Soccer Stadium
- Colors: Navy and gold
- Mascot: Boomer the Bobcat
- Fight song: The Bobcat Roar
- Website: gobobcats.com
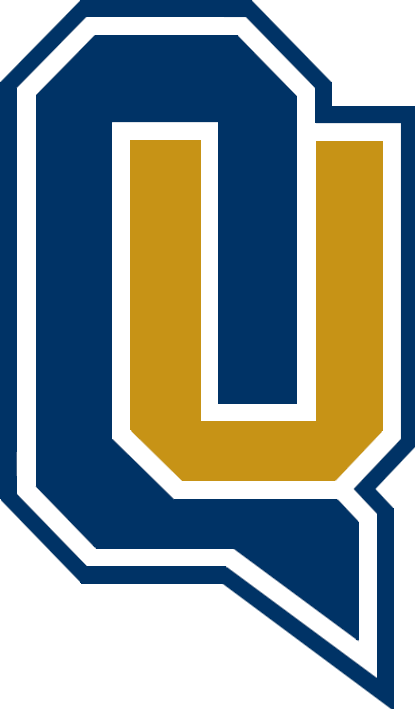

Team NCAA championships
- 1

The Quinnipiac Bobcats are the 21 sports teams representing Quinnipiac University in Hamden, Connecticut in intercollegiate athletics. The Bobcats compete in the NCAA Division I and are members of the Metro Atlantic Athletic Conference, joining on July 1, 2013, after being in the Northeast Conference.

They were originally known as the Quinnipiac Braves until 2002.

The Bobcats compete outside the MAAC in three sports. Despite the MAAC sponsoring field hockey, the Bobcats moved their field hockey team into the Big East Conference in 2016. In ice hockey, a sport not sponsored by the MAAC for either men or women, both Quinnipiac teams play in ECAC Hockey. In the Spring of 2017, Quinnipiac announced they were partnering with Adidas to provide athletic wear for all varsity teams.

== Sponsored sports ==
Men's sports	Women's sports
Baseball	Acrobatics and tumbling
Basketball	Basketball
Cross country	Cross country
Ice hockey	Field hockey
Lacrosse	Golf
Soccer	Ice hockey
Tennis	Lacrosse
	Rugby
	Soccer
	Softball
	Tennis
	Track and field^{1}
	Volleyball
^{1} – includes both indoor and outdoor
