= Conference USA women's soccer tournament =

American soccer tournament

C-USA women's soccer tournament
- Conference soccer championship
- Sport: College soccer
- Conference: Conference USA
- Number of teams: 6
- Format: Single-elimination
- Current stadium: Robert Mack Caruthers Field
- Current location: Ruston, Louisiana
- Played: 1995–present
- Last contest: 2026
- Current champion: Liberty (3rd title)
- Most championships: Memphis (5 titles)
- TV partner: ESPN+
- Official website: conferenceusa.com/wsoc

The Conference USA women's soccer tournament is the conference championship tournament in soccer for Conference USA (C-USA). The tournament has been held every year in November since 1995. It is a single-elimination tournament and seeding is based on regular season records. The winner, declared conference champion, receives the conference's automatic bid to the NCAA Division I women's soccer championship.

== Champions ==
=== Finals ===
Key

- (1) – Title number
- a.e.t. – Match went to extra time
- p – Match decided by a penalty shootout after extra time
- – Winning team won regular season

=== By year ===
Ed.	Year	Champion	Score	Runner-up	Venue / city	MVP (O)	MVP (D)	Ref.
1	1995	Charlotte (1)	1–0 (a.e.t.)	Evansville	Meyers Field • Cincinnati, Ohio	Blair Angell (Charlotte) (Forward); Terra May (Evansville) (Midfielder)	Benji Lewis (Charlotte) (Defender); Heather Bridgewater (Charlotte) (Goalkeeper)	
2	1996	Cincinnati (1)	4–2 (a.e.t.)	Marquette	Transamerica Field • Charlotte, North Carolina	Regina Sekyra (Marquette) (Forward); Paulette Angilecchia (Cincinnati) (Midfielder)	Nicole Thorne (Cincinnati) (Defender); Stacy Sipotz (Marquette) (Goalkeeper)	
3	1997	Cincinnati (2)	1–0	Marquette	Anheuser-Busch Conference & Sports Centre • Fenton, Missouri	Tina Matlock (Cincinnati) (Forward); Kelly Roethe (Marquette) (Midfielder)	Rhegan Hyypio (Marquette) (Defender); Christy Hoffman (Cincinnati) (Goalkeeper)	
4	1998	Charlotte (2)	0–0 (5–4 p)	Marquette	Cox Soccer Complex • Farmers Branch, Texas	Christian Papp (Charlotte) (Forward); Lynette Rossini (Marquette) (Midfielder)	Rhegan Hyypio (Marquette) (Defender); Mo Bothwell (Marquette) (Goalkeeper)	
5	1999	Marquette (1)	2–1 (a.e.t.)	Charlotte	Cox Soccer Complex • Farmers Branch, Texas	Erin Morgan (Marquette) (Forward); Kelly Roethe (Marquette) (Midfielder)	Jen Bransford (Charlotte) (Defender); Jennifer Howell (Charlotte) (Goalkeeper)	
6	2000	Marquette (2)	1–0 (a.e.t.)	Charlotte	Hermann Stadium • St. Louis, Missouri	Kate Gordon (Marquette) (Forward); Kristen Jensen (Marquette) (Midfielder)	Heather O'Neil (Marquette) (Defender); Christy Hoffman (Cincinnati) (Goalkeeper)	
7	2001	Cincinnati (3)	1–0	Marquette	Valley Fields • Milwaukee, Wisconsin	Ann Thomas (Cincinnati) (Forward); Nicole Luse (Cincinnati) (Midfielder)	Anne Dalecky (Marquette) (Defender); Christy Hoffman (Cincinnati) (Goalkeeper)	
8	2002	Cincinnati (4)	2–1	Marquette	Transamerica Field • Charlotte, North Carolina	Tasha Wagner (Cincinnati)	Stacey Kyser (Cincinnati)	
9	2003	DePaul (1)	1–1 (4–3 p)	Saint Louis	Transamerica Field • Charlotte, North Carolina	Julianne Sitch (DePaul)	Lindsay Deason (DePaul)	
10	2004	UAB (1)	2–1	Saint Louis	Hermann Stadium • St. Louis, Missouri	Jenny Rynders (UAB)	Brianna McCarty (UAB)	
11	2005	Rice (1)	3–0	UTEP	Rice Soccer & Track Stadium • Houston, Texas	Anne Candee (Rice)	Adriene Giese (Rice)	
12	2006	UAB (2)	3–2	Colorado College	Westcott Field • Dallas, Texas	Jill Porto (UAB)	Laura Richards (UAB)	
13	2007	Memphis (1)	2–0	UCF	University Field • El Paso, Texas	Ashley Berra (Memphis)	Kelsey Bakker (Memphis)	
14	2008	Memphis (2)	4–1	East Carolina	Rice Soccer & Track Stadium • Houston, Texas	Laura Laufenberg (Memphis)	Kelsey Bakker (Memphis)	
15	2009	Memphis (3)	3–0	UCF	Westcott Field • Dallas, Texas	Taylor Isenhower (Memphis)	Elise Kuhar-Pitters (Memphis)	
16	2010	Memphis (4)	1–0	UCF	UCF Soccer Complex • Orlando, Florida	Vendula Strnadova (Memphis)	Elise Kuhar-Pitters (Memphis)	
17	2011	Memphis (5)	2–1 (a.e.t.)	UTEP	Mike Rose Soccer Complex • Memphis, Tennessee	Christabel Oduro (Memphis)	Lizzy Simonin (Memphis)	
18	2012	UCF (1)	2–0	Tulsa	University Field • El Paso, Texas	Nicolette Radovcic (UCF)	Marissa Diggs (UCF)	
19	2013	Colorado College (1)	3–0	North Texas	Holloway Field • Houston, Texas	Jessie Ayers (Colorado College)	Kate Scheele (Colorado College)	
20	2014	Rice (2)	1–0	North Texas	Transamerica Field • Charlotte, North Carolina	Gabriela Iribarne (Rice)	Ashton Geisendorff (Rice)	
21	2015	North Texas (1)	1–0	Marshall	FIU Soccer Stadium • Miami, Florida	Rachel Holden (North Texas)	Jackie Kerestine (North Texas)	
22	2016	Charlotte (3)	4–0	Florida Atlantic	Transamerica Field • Charlotte, North Carolina	Katie O'Neill (Charlotte)	Shelby Hicks (Charlotte)	
23	2017	North Texas (2)	0–0 (3–1 p)	Charlotte	FAU Soccer Stadium • Boca Raton, Florida	Taylor Torres (North Texas)	Dominique James (North Texas)	
24	2018	North Texas (3)	2–1 (a.e.t.)	Southern Miss	Old Dominion Soccer Complex • Norfolk, Virginia	Lauryn Bruffett (North Texas)	Carissa Sanders (North Texas)	
25	2019	North Texas (4)	5–2	Florida Atlantic	North Texas Soccer Stadium • Denton, Texas	Allie Byrd (North Texas)	Dominique James (North Texas)	
26	2020	Rice (3)	2–0	Charlotte	Holloway Field • Houston, Texas	Delaney Schultz (Rice)	Mijke Roelfsema (Rice)	
27	2021	Old Dominion (1)	1–0	Southern Miss	FAU Soccer Stadium • Boca Raton, Florida	Carla Morich (Old Dominion)	Emily Roberts (Old Dominion)	
28	2022	UTSA (1)	3–2 (a.e.t.)	Florida Atlantic	Transamerica Field • Charlotte, North Carolina	Anna Sutter (UTSA)	Kendall Kloza (UTSA)	
29	2023	Liberty (1)	2–1	New Mexico State	Robert Mack Caruthers Field • Ruston, Louisiana	Rachel DeRuby (Liberty)	Ainsley Leja (Liberty)	
30	2024	FIU (1)	1–0	Liberty	FIU Soccer Stadium • Miami, Florida	Noémi Paquin (FIU)	Delinda Sehlin (FIU)	
31	2025	Liberty (2)	3–0	Missouri State	Osborne Stadium • Lynchburg, Virginia	Ivy Garner (Liberty)	Lauren Littleton (Liberty)	
32	2026	Liberty (3)	3–1	Western Kentucky	Stuart and Suzanne Grant Stadium • Newark, Delaware	Halle Engle (Liberty)	Maddyson Kerley (Liberty)	

Note: from 1995 to 2001, a most valuable forward, midfielder, defender, and goalkeeper were selected.

=== By school ===
As of November 2026

School	W	L	T	Pct.	Finals	Titles	Years won
Charlotte	19	12	7	.592	7	3	1995, 1998, 2016
Cincinnati	14	4	1	.763	4	4	1996, 1997, 2001, 2002
Colorado College	6	5	2	.538	2	1	2013
Delaware	1	1	1	.500	0	0	—
DePaul	2	3	1	.417	1	1	2003
East Carolina	5	9	2	.375	1	0	—
Evansville	2	1	0	.667	1	0	—
FIU	2	4	0	.333	1	1	2024
Florida Atlantic	6	8	2	.438	3	0	—
Houston	2	7	1	.250	0	0	—
Jacksonville State	0	1	0	.000	0	0	—
Kennesaw State	0	1	0	.000	0	0	—
Liberty	7	1	1	.833	4	3	2023, 2025, 2026
Louisiana Tech	3	7	3	.346	0	0	—
Louisville	2	3	0	.400	0	0	—
Marquette	17	7	1	.700	6	2	1999, 2000
Marshall	3	4	0	.429	1	0	—
Middle Tennessee	3	9	2	.286	0	0	—
Missouri State	2	1	0	.667	1	0	—
Memphis	17	7	1	.700	5	5	2007, 2008, 2009, 2010, 2011
New Mexico State	3	2	1	.583	1	0	–
North Texas	16	6	2	.708	6	4	2015, 2017, 2018, 2019
Old Dominion	4	5	0	.444	1	1	2021
Rice	11	10	4	.520	3	3	2005, 2014, 2020
Saint Louis	4	6	3	.423	2	0	—
Sam Houston	1	3	2	.333	0	0	–
SMU	2	6	2	.300	0	0	—
South Florida	2	7	0	.222	0	0	—
Southern Miss	6	5	1	.542	2	0	—
TCU	0	0	1	.500	0	0	—
Tulane	0	6	1	.071	0	0	—
Tulsa	2	3	2	.429	1	0	—
UAB	7	14	6	.370	2	2	2004, 2006
UCF	9	7	0	.563	4	1	2012
UTEP	5	8	3	.406	2	0	—
UTSA	4	1	0	.800	1	1	2022
Western Kentucky	3	10	0	.231	1	0	—

Teams in italics no longer sponsor women's soccer in Conference USA.
