= Ashley Henderson =

American soccer player (born 2004)

- Henderson with Florida State in 2026

Personal information
- Full name: Ashley Nicole Henderson
- Date of birth: October 17, 2004 (age 22)
- Height: 5 ft 6 in (1.68 m)
- Position: Forward

Team information
- Current team: Florida State Seminoles

Youth career
- 2021–2022: Harding Lions

College career
Years	Team	Apps	(Gls)
2023–2025	Memphis Tigers	46	(19)
2026–	Florida State Seminoles	10	(1)

Senior career*
Years	Team	Apps	(Gls)
2024	Tormenta FC	8	(2)
2025	Eagle FC	4	(3)

International career^{‡}
2025–	United States (futsal)	3	(2)
- * Club domestic league appearances and goals ‡ National team caps and goals as of May 1, 2025

Ashley Nicole Henderson (born October 17, 2004) is an American college soccer player who plays as a forward for the Florida State Seminoles. She previously played for the Memphis Tigers, earning third-team All-American honors in 2025. She has played for the United States national futsal team internationally.

== Early life ==
Henderson grew up in Memphis, Tennessee, and played football, baseball, and basketball when she was young. She began playing futsal on the tennis courts in her apartment complex when she was in fifth or sixth grade. After being spotted as the only girl playing against boys, she first joined a girls' team at local club Futsal Escola under coach Rafa Rodriguez. She didn't play organized soccer until eleventh grade when she transferred from Kirby High School to Harding Academy to play under Rodriguez, who had become head coach there. Relatively late to the recruiting process, she walked on to the Memphis Tigers.

== College career ==
Henderson played in 21 games off the bench and scored 4 goals for the Memphis Tigers as a freshman in 2023. She helped the Tigers win their third consecutive AAC tournament, opening the scoring against SMU in the final. In the NCAA tournament, she scored the winner against Notre Dame to reach the round of 16. She took on a bigger role as a sophomore in 2024, starting 18 games and leading the team with 9 goals plus 3 assists, and was named second-team All-AAC. She helped the team to a second consecutive AAC regular-season title but lost in the tournament final, missing the NCAA tournament.

Henderson had a breakout junior season in 2025, starting all 21 games and scoring 10 goals with 9 assists. She captained Memphis as high as the No. 3 ranking in the nation and won a third consecutive American Conference title. Though the team lost on penalties in the conference tournament, the Tigers carried an undefeated record into the NCAA tournament, making the second round. Henderson was recognized as third-team All-American by United Soccer Coaches, first-team all-conference, and the American Conference Offensive Player of the Year. She transferred to the Florida State Seminoles for her senior season in 2026.

During college, Henderson also played for Tormenta FC and Eagle FC in the USL W League. She also played for Ultrain FC at the Soccer Tournament 2025.

== International career ==
Henderson was first called into training camp with the United States national futsal team in April 2025. She made the roster later that month for the inaugural 2025 CONCACAF W Futsal Championship in Guatemala, scoring twice in their opening match against Honduras. The team finished third in their group, failing to advance and missing out on the inaugural 2025 FIFA Futsal Women's World Cup.

== Honors and awards ==
Memphis Tigers

- American Conference: 2023, 2024, 2025
- AAC tournament: 2023

Individual

- Third-team All-American: 2025
- American Conference Offensive Player of the Year: 2025
- First-team All-American Conference: 2025
- Second-team All-AAC: 2024
