= 2017 Conference USA women's soccer tournament =

- Classification: Division I
- Teams: 8
- Matches: 7
- Attendance: 1,193
- Site: FAU Soccer Stadium; Boca Raton, Florida
- Champions: North Texas (2nd title)
- Winning coach: John Hedlund (2nd title)
- Broadcast: CUSA TV (Quarterfinals and Semifinals); ESPN3 (Final)

2017 Conference USA women's soccer standings
	Conf.						Overall
Team	W		L		T	PCT	W		L		T	PCT
Rice ‍†‍‍^{y}	9	–	0	–	1	.950	12	–	4	–	2	.722
North Texas ‍‍‡‍^{y}	6	–	1	–	2	.778	13	–	4	–	4	.714
UAB ‍‍‍	7	–	2	–	1	.750	13	–	4	–	3	.725
Louisiana Tech ‍‍‍	6	–	1	–	3	.750	14	–	3	–	5	.750
Old Dominion ‍‍‍	6	–	2	–	2	.700	9	–	5	–	4	.611
Florida Atlantic ‍‍‍	5	–	4	–	1	.550	11	–	8	–	2	.571
Middle Tennessee ‍‍‍	5	–	5	–	0	.500	8	–	10	–	0	.444
Charlotte ‍‍‍	4	–	5	–	1	.450	11	–	8	–	2	.571
Western Kentucky ‍‍‍	4	–	5	–	1	.450	7	–	9	–	1	.441
UTEP ‍‍‍	4	–	6	–	0	.400	8	–	11	–	0	.421
Marshall ‍‍‍	3	–	6	–	1	.350	5	–	11	–	1	.324
UTSA ‍‍‍	2	–	8	–	0	.200	3	–	14	–	0	.176
Southern Miss ‍‍‍	0	–	7	–	3	.150	6	–	9	–	3	.417
FIU ‍‍‍	0	–	9	–	0	.000	1	–	13	–	0	.071
† – Conference champion ‡ – 2017 C-USA Tournament champion y – Invited to the NCAA tournament As of November 10, 2017; Rankings from United Soccer Coaches Poll; Source:Conference USA

The 2017 Conference USA women's soccer tournament was the postseason women's soccer tournament for Conference USA held from November 1 through 5, 2017. The seven-match tournament took place at FAU Soccer Stadium in Boca Raton, Florida. The eight-team single-elimination tournament consisted of three rounds based on seeding from regular season conference play. The defending champions were the Charlotte 49ers, but they failed to defend their title after losing the penalty shoot-out tiebreaking procedure in the final following a tie with the North Texas Mean Green. The conference championship was the second for the North Texas women's soccer program, both of which have come under the direction of head coach John Hedlund.

== Bracket ==
Quarterfinals; Wednesday, Nov. 1
1	Rice	0
8	Charlotte	1
4	Louisiana Tech	2
5	Old Dominion	1
2	North Texas	4
7	Middle Tennessee	1
3	UAB	0
6	Florida Atlantic	1^{OT}

Semifinals; Friday, Nov. 3
8	Charlotte	1
4	Louisiana Tech	0
2	North Texas	2
6	Florida Atlantic	0

Final; Sunday, Nov. 5
8	Charlotte	0 (1)
2	North Texas	0 (3)

== Schedule ==
=== Quarterfinals ===
November 1, 2017	#1 Rice	0–1	#8 Charlotte	Boca Raton, Florida
11:00 a.m. EDT		Report	88' Martha Thomas	Stadium: FAU Soccer Stadium; Attendance: 618; Referee: Jorge Ramirez; Assistant referees: Eric Proctor; Kyle Borne; Fourth official: Danny Thornberry

November 1, 2017	#4 Louisiana Tech	2–1	#5 Old Dominion	Boca Raton, Florida
1:30 p.m. EDT	Nomvula Kgoale 61'; Jenna Dages 63'	Report	44' Iris Achterhof	Stadium: FAU Soccer Stadium; Referee: Daniel Radford; Assistant referees: Cory Richardson; Hayden Oscanoa; Fourth official: Guido Gonzales

November 1, 2017	#2 North Texas	4–1	#7 Middle Tennessee	Boca Raton, Florida
4:30 p.m. EDT	Brooke Lampe 2'; Taylor Torres 26', 62', 87'	Report	Taylor Hatch 42'	Stadium: FAU Soccer Stadium; Referee: Guido Gonzales; Assistant referees: Danny Thornberry; Trent Vanhaitsma; Fourth official: Nima Saghafi

November 1, 2017	#3 UAB	0–1 (a.e.t.)	#6 Florida Atlantic	Boca Raton, Florida
7:00 p.m. EDT		Report	94' Asta Arnadottir	Stadium: FAU Soccer Stadium; Attendance: 618; Referee: Nima Saghafi; Assistant referees: Cory Richardson; Hayden Oscanoa; Fourth official: Jorge Ramirez

=== Semifinals ===
November 3, 2017	#8 Charlotte	1–0	#4 Louisiana Tech	Boca Raton, Florida
11:00 a.m. EDT	Martha Thomas 60'	Report		Stadium: FAU Soccer Stadium; Referee: Margaret Domka; Assistant referees: Marcos DeOliveira; Andres Schwarz; Fourth official: Nima Saghafi

November 3, 2017	#2 North Texas	2–0	#6 Florida Atlantic	Boca Raton, Florida
1:30 p.m. EDT	Ariel Diaz 12'; Aaliyah Nolan 85'	Report		Stadium: FAU Soccer Stadium; Attendance: 352; Referee: Christina Unkel; Assistant referees: Eric Proctor; Kyle Borne; Fourth official: Jorge Ramirez

=== Final ===
November 5, 2017	#8 Charlotte	0–0 (a.e.t.) (1–3 p)	#2 North Texas	Boca Raton, Florida
11:00 a.m. EST		Report		Stadium: FAU Soccer Stadium; Attendance: 223; Referee: Daniel Radford; Assistant referees: Kyle Borne; Jorge Ramirez; Fourth official: Margaret Domka
	Penalties
	Kyla Clark (penalty missed); Meredith Hamby (penalty missed); Abby Taylor (penalty scored); Riley Orr (penalty missed)		(penalty scored) Tori Phillips; (penalty missed) Brittnye Lawson; (penalty scored) Elle Marie DeFrain; (penalty scored) Taylor Torres

== Statistics ==
=== Goalscorers ===
3 Goals

- Taylor Torres - North Texas

2 Goals

- Martha Thomas - Charlotte

1 Goal

- Iris Achterhof - Old Dominion
- Asta Arnadottir - Florida Atlantic
- Jenna Dages - Louisiana Tech
- Ariel Diaz - North Texas
- Taylor Hatch - Middle Tennessee
- Nomvula Kgoale - Louisiana Tech
- Brooke Lampe - North Texas
- Aaliyah Nolan - North Texas

== See also ==
- 2017 Conference USA Men's Soccer Tournament
