= 2018 Conference USA women's soccer tournament =

- Classification: Division I
- Teams: 8
- Matches: 7
- Attendance: 478
- Site: Old Dominion Soccer Complex; Norfolk, Virginia
- Champions: North Texas (3rd title)
- Winning coach: John Hedlund (3rd title)
- MVP: Lauryn Bruffett (Offensive); Carissa Sanders (Defensive) (North Texas)
- Broadcast: ESPN+

2018 Conference USA women's soccer standings
	Conf.						Overall
Team	W		L		T	PCT	W		L		T	PCT
North Texas ‍†‍‡‍^{y}	8	–	1	–	1	.850	15	–	3	–	3	.786
Florida Atlantic ‍‍‍	8	–	1	–	1	.850	12	–	8	–	1	.595
UAB ‍‍‍	6	–	4	–	0	.600	9	–	8	–	1	.528
Louisiana Tech ‍‍‍	5	–	3	–	2	.600	13	–	5	–	3	.690
Old Dominion ‍‍‍	5	–	3	–	2	.600	8	–	7	–	4	.526
Southern Miss ‍‍‍	5	–	4	–	1	.550	13	–	6	–	1	.675
Middle Tennessee ‍‍‍	5	–	4	–	1	.550	10	–	7	–	1	.583
Rice ‍‍‍	5	–	4	–	1	.550	7	–	9	–	1	.441
Charlotte ‍‍‍	4	–	6	–	0	.400	8	–	9	–	0	.471
Western Kentucky ‍‍‍	3	–	5	–	2	.400	5	–	8	–	4	.412
Marshall ‍‍‍	3	–	6	–	1	.350	5	–	9	–	3	.382
UTEP ‍‍‍	2	–	5	–	3	.350	7	–	8	–	4	.474
UTSA ‍‍‍	2	–	6	–	2	.300	6	–	9	–	2	.412
FIU ‍‍‍	0	–	9	–	1	.050	0	–	17	–	1	.028
† – Conference champion ‡ – 2018 C-USA Tournament champion y – Invited to the NCAA tournament As of November 14, 2018; Rankings from United Soccer Coaches Poll; Source:Conference USA

The 2018 Conference USA women's soccer tournament was the postseason women's soccer tournament for Conference USA held from October 31 through November 4, 2018. The seven-match tournament took place at Old Dominion Soccer Complex in Norfolk, Virginia. The eight-team single-elimination tournament consisted of three rounds based on seeding from regular season conference play. The defending champions were the North Texas Mean Green, who defended their title after defeating the Southern Miss Golden Eagles in the final. The conference championship was the third for the North Texas women's soccer program, all three of which have come under the direction of head coach John Hedlund.

== Bracket ==
Quarterfinals; Wednesday, Oct. 31
2	Florida Atlantic	2^{OT}
7	Middle Tennessee	1
3	UAB	0
6	Southern Miss	1
1	North Texas	2
8	Rice	0
4	Louisiana Tech	3^{OT}
5	Old Dominion	2

Semifinals; Friday, Nov. 2
2	Florida Atlantic	0
6	Southern Miss	1
1	North Texas	1 (3)
4	Louisiana Tech	1 (2)

Final; Sunday, Nov. 4
6	Southern Miss	1
1	North Texas	2^{2OT}

== Schedule ==
=== Quarterfinals ===
October 31, 2018	#2 Florida Atlantic	2–1 (a.e.t.)	#7 Middle Tennessee	Norfolk, Virginia
11:30 a.m. EST	Tiril Haga 59'; Carolynn Wotring (yellow card) 66'; Emma Grissom 93'	Report	Amber Hoot 40'	Stadium: Old Dominion Soccer Complex; Attendance: N/A; Referee: Timothy Debysingh; Assistant referees: Jamie Willis; Charles Raney; Fourth official: Jorge Ramirez

October 31, 2018	#3 UAB	0–1	#6 Southern Miss	Norfolk, Virginia
2:00 p.m. EST	Kassandra Daniel (yellow card) 53'	Report	Jessica Shepherd (yellow card) 54'; Miah Zuazua 78'	Stadium: Old Dominion Soccer Complex; Attendance: N/A

October 31, 2018	#1 North Texas	2–0	#8 Rice	Norfolk, Virginia
4:30 p.m. EST	Madeline Guderian 63'; Carissa Sanders 73'	Report	Darcy Mickalow (yellow card) 63'	Stadium: Old Dominion Soccer Complex; Attendance: N/A

October 31, 2018	#4 Louisiana Tech	3–2 (a.e.t.)	#5 Old Dominion	Norfolk, Virginia
7:00 p.m. EST	Elizabeth Doll (yellow card) 5' (goal) 54'; Hanna Banks 85'; Mylene Roy-Ouellet 93'	Report	Cristina Bashara (yellow card) 31'; Raegan Tate 42'; Amanda Nhek 47'	Stadium: Old Dominion Soccer Complex; Attendance: 207

=== Semifinals ===
November 2, 2018	#2 Florida Atlantic	0–1	#6 Southern Miss	Norfolk, Virginia
4:30 p.m. EST		Report	Monica Maldonaldo (yellow card) 38'; Stephanie Garcia 41'	Stadium: Old Dominion Soccer Complex; Attendance: 88; Referee: Jorge Ramirez; Assistant referees: Robert Velbis; Jamie Willis; Fourth official: JC Griggs

November 2, 2018	#1 North Texas	1–1 (a.e.t.) (3–2 p)	#4 Louisiana Tech	Norfolk, Virginia
7:00 p.m. EST	Olivia Klein 38'; Madeline Guderian (yellow card) 72'; Dominique James (yellow card) 83'; Team (yellow card) 97'	Report	Alexandra Augustyn 54'	Stadium: Old Dominion Soccer Complex; Attendance: 74; Referee: Daniel Thornberry; Assistant referees: JC Griggs; William Dittmar; Fourth official: Lance Jacob VanHaits
	Penalties
	Aaliyah Nolan (penalty scored); Kelsey Brann (penalty missed); Taylor Torres (penalty missed); Kaity Hemperly (penalty scored); Ansley Bunger (penalty scored)		Jaelyn Peeples (penalty scored); Sophia Smith (penalty scored); Makenna Johnson (penalty missed); Mazie Jones (penalty missed); Stella Li (penalty missed)

=== Final ===
November 4, 2018	#6 Southern Miss	1–2 (a.e.t.)	#1 North Texas	Norfolk, Virginia
11:00 a.m. EST	Stephanie Garcia (red card) 71'; Ola Akinniyi 78'	Report	Aaliyah Nolan 15'; Lauryn Bruffett 105'	Stadium: Old Dominion Soccer Complex; Attendance: 109; Referee: Lance VanHaitsma; Assistant referees: Jamie Willis; Danny Thornberry; Fourth official: Jorge Ramirez

== Statistics ==
=== Goalscorers ===
1 Goal

- Ola Akinniyi - Southern Miss
- Alexandra Augustyn - Louisiana Tech
- Hanna Banks - Louisiana Tech
- Lauryn Bruffett - North Texas
- Elizabeth Doll - Louisiana Tech
- Stephanie Garcia - Southern Miss
- Emma Grissom - Florida Atlantic
- Madeline Guderian - North Texas
- Tiril Haga - Florida Atlantic
- Amber Hoot - Middle Tennessee
- Amanda Nhek - Old Dominion
- Olivia Klein - North Texas
- Aaliyah Nolan - North Texas
- Mylene Roy-Ouellet - Louisiana Tech
- Carissa Sanders - North Texas
- Raegan Tate - Old Dominion
- Miah Zuazua - Southern Miss

== All-Tournament team ==
Player	Team
**Lauryn Bruffett**	North Texas
Carissa Sanders	North Texas
Kelsey Brann	North Texas
Madeline Guderian	North Texas
Jenny Caracheo	Southern Miss
Kendell Mindnich	Southern Miss
Miah Zuazua	Southern Miss
Jessica Monteiro	Florida Atlantic
Emma Grissom	Florida Atlantic
Jaelyn Peeples	Louisiana Tech
Elizabeth Doll	Louisiana Tech

Note: Offensive MVP shown in bold, defensive MVP shown in italics.

== See also ==
- 2018 Conference USA Men's Soccer Tournament
