= 2021 Conference USA women's soccer tournament =

- Classification: Division I
- Teams: 10
- Matches: 9
- Attendance: 1,529
- Site: FAU Soccer Stadium; Boca Raton, Florida
- Champions: Old Dominion (1st title)
- Winning coach: Angie Hind (1st title)
- MVP: Carla Morich (Offensive); Emily Roberts (Defensive) (Old Dominion)
- Broadcast: ESPN+

2021 Conference USA women's soccer standings
	Conf.						Overall
Team	W		L		T	PCT	W		L		T	PCT
East
Old Dominion ‍†‍‡‍^{y}	6	–	1	–	1	.813	13	–	5	–	1	.711
Western Kentucky ‍‍‍	5	–	2	–	1	.688	10	–	5	–	1	.656
Middle Tennessee ‍‍‍	5	–	3	–	0	.625	10	–	8	–	1	.553
Florida Atlantic ‍‍‍	4	–	2	–	2	.625	6	–	7	–	5	.472
Charlotte ‍‍‍	3	–	2	–	3	.563	7	–	5	–	4	.563
FIU ‍‍‍	1	–	5	–	2	.250	2	–	12	–	2	.188
Marshall ‍‍‍	0	–	7	–	1	.063	3	–	11	–	2	.250
West
Southern Miss ‍‍‍	4	–	1	–	3	.688	10	–	4	–	3	.676
Rice ‍‍‍	4	–	3	–	1	.563	10	–	6	–	2	.611
UAB ‍‍‍	4	–	3	–	1	.563	7	–	9	–	3	.447
UTSA ‍‍‍	3	–	2	–	3	.563	10	–	5	–	4	.632
North Texas ‍‍‍	3	–	3	–	2	.500	8	–	5	–	4	.588
Louisiana Tech ‍‍‍	2	–	4	–	2	.375	6	–	8	–	3	.441
UTEP ‍‍‍	1	–	7	–	0	.125	4	–	12	–	0	.250
† – Conference champion ‡ – 2021 C-USA Tournament champion y – Invited to the NCAA tournament As of December 7, 2021; Rankings from United Soccer Coaches Poll; Source:Conference USA

The 2021 Conference USA women's soccer tournament was the postseason women's soccer tournament for Conference USA held from November 1 through November 7, 2021. The nine-match tournament took place at FAU Soccer Stadium in Boca Raton, Florida. The ten-team single-elimination tournament consisted of four rounds based on seeding from regular season conference play. The defending champions were the Rice Owls. Rice was unable to defend their title after being defeated by Middle Tennessee in the Quarterfinals. The Old Dominion Monarchs won the title by defeating Southern Miss in the final 1–0. The conference championship was the first for the Old Dominion women's soccer program and first for head coach Angie Hind. As tournament champions, Old Dominion earned C-USA's automatic berth into the 2021 NCAA Division I Women's Soccer Tournament.

== Seeding ==
Ten teams qualified for the 2021 tournament based on their regular season records. The top five teams in each division were selected for tournament play. The tournament was set up so the first round matched the fourth seed and fifth seed of each conference and the quarterfinals featured cross-conference play. One tiebreaker was required between Rice and UAB, both of which finished 4–3–1 and tied for second place in the West Region. Rice won the tiebreaker and was awarded the second seed in the West based on their 2–1 overtime victory over UAB on October 8.

East Region
Finish	Team	Conference Record
1	Old Dominion	6–1–1
2	Western Kentucky	5–2–1
3	Middle Tennessee	5–3–0
4	Florida Atlantic	4–2–2
5	Charlotte	3–2–3

West Region
Finish	Team	Conference Record
1	Southern Miss	4–1–3
2	Rice	4–3–1
3	UAB	4–3–1
4	UTSA	3–2–3
5	North Texas	3–3–2

== Bracket ==
First Round; Monday, Nov. 1
4W	UTSA (a.e.t.)	1
5W	North Texas	0
4E	Florida Atlantic (pen.)	2 (5)
5E	Charlotte	2 (4)

Quarterfinals; Wednesday, Nov. 3
1E	Old Dominion (a.e.t.)	1
4W	UTSA	0
2W	Rice	0 (3)
3E	Middle Tennessee (pen.)	0 (4)
2E	Western Kentucky	0
3W	UAB	1
1W	Southern Miss	2
4E	Florida Atlantic	1

Semifinals; Friday, Nov. 5
1E	Old Dominion	2
3E	Middle Tennessee	1
1W	Southern Miss	2
3W	UAB	1

Final; Sunday, Nov. 7
1W	Old Dominion	1
1E	Southern Miss	0

== Schedule ==
=== First Round ===
November 1, 2021	#4W UTSA	1–0 (a.e.t.)	#5W North Texas	Boca Raton, FL
4:30 p.m. ET	Own Goal 107'	Report		Stadium: FAU Soccer Stadium; Attendance: 179; Referee: Elvis Osmanovic; Assistant referees: Hayden Oscanoa; Irvin Castilla-Quija; Fourth official: Jamie Herrera

November 1, 2021	#4E Florida Atlantic	2–2 (a.e.t.) (5–4 p)	#5E Charlotte	Boca Raton, FL
7:00 p.m. ET	Miracle Porter 13'; Emma Grissom 54'	Report	50' Piper Biziorek; 64' Haley Shand	Stadium: FAU Soccer Stadium; Attendance: 312; Referee: Jamie Herrera; Assistant referees: Mauro Gonzalez; Raidel Toledo Andino; Fourth official: Andres Pfefferkorn
	Penalties
	Sammy Vitols (penalty scored); Bri Austin (penalty missed); Emma Grisson (penalty scored); Hailey Landrus (penalty scored); Miracle Porter (penalty missed); Maddison Krstec (penalty scored); Mia Sennes (penalty scored)		(penalty missed) Michaella Arteta; (penalty scored) Macey Bader; (penalty scored) Paige Rosenfeld; (penalty scored) Haley Shand; (penalty missed) Charlotte Harris; (penalty scored) Kiara Pralle; (penalty missed) Emma Wakeman

=== Quarterfinals ===
November 3, 2021	#2W Rice	0–0 (a.e.t.) (3–4 p)	#3E Middle Tennessee	Boca Raton, FL
11:00 a.m. ET	Allison Padron (yellow card) 71'	Report		Stadium: FAU Soccer Stadium; Attendance: 135; Referee: Jorge Ramirez; Assistant referees: Jamie Willis; Fourth official: Alex Del Angel
	Penalties
	Delaney Schultz (penalty scored); Bella Killgore (penalty missed); Serena Pham (penalty scored); Mariana Elizondo (penalty scored); Catarina Albuquerque (penalty missed); Shiloh Miller (penalty missed)		(penalty missed) Eleanor Gough; (penalty missed) Carolina Manley; (penalty scored) Elizabeth Slavinsky; (penalty scored) Kirstine Lykke; (penalty scored) Hannah Suder; (penalty scored) Alayna Lynchard

November 3, 2021	#1E Old Dominion	1–0 (a.e.t.)	#4W UTSA	Boca Raton, FL
1:30 p.m. ET	Riley Kennett 93'	Report		Stadium: FAU Soccer Stadium; Attendance: 115; Referee: Alex Del Angel; Assistant referees: Hayden Oscanoa; William Torres; Fourth official: Jorge Ramirez

November 3, 2021	#2E Western Kentucky	0–1	#3W UAB	Boca Raton, FL
4:30 p.m. ET	Katie Erwin (yellow card) 65'	Report	28' Lexxe Lipsey	Stadium: FAU Soccer Stadium; Attendance: 123; Referee: Elvis Osmanovic; Assistant referees: Raidel Toledo Andino; Gerson Castellanos; Fourth official: Jamie Herrera

November 3, 2021	#1W Southern Miss	2–1	#4E Florida Atlantic	Boca Raton, FL
7:00 p.m. ET	Sam Stiglmair 2'; Blessing Kingsley 39'; Ilana Izquierdo (yellow card) 42'	Report	(yellow card) 2' Lauren Holland; 89' Miracle Porter	Stadium: FAU Soccer Stadium; Attendance: 233; Referee: Timothy Debysingh; Assistant referees: Hayden Oscana; William Torres; Fourth official: Jamie Willis

=== Semifinals ===
November 5, 2021	#1E Old Dominion	2–1	#3E Middle Tennessee	Boca Raton, FL
4:30 p.m.	Jasmine Crawley (yellow card) 5'; Ryan Parncutt (yellow card) 8'; Ece Turkoglu 29'; Yuliia Khrystiuck 57'	Report	5' (pen.) Peyton DePriest	Stadium: FAU Soccer Stadium; Attendance: 104; Referee: Sorin Stoica; Assistant referees: Irvin Castilla-Quijano; Jamie Willis; Fourth official: Timothy Debysingh

November 5, 2021	#1W Southern Miss	2–1	#3W UAB	Boca Raton, FL
7:00 p.m.	Madisyn Flammia 55', (yellow card) 67'; Alice Campos (yellow card) 79'; Ariel Diaz 87'	Report	16' Morgan Halliwill; (yellow card) 43' Lucy Thrasher	Stadium: FAU Soccer Stadium; Attendance: 167; Referee: Cory Rockwell; Assistant referees: Hayden Oscanoa; William Torres; Fourth official: Alex Del Angel

=== Final ===
November 7, 2021	#1W Southern Miss	0–1	#1E Old Dominion	Boca Raton, FL
1:00 p.m. ET		Report	20' Morgan Hall; (yellow card) 76' Yuliia Khrystiuk	Stadium: FAU Soccer Stadium; Attendance: 161; Referee: Matthew Thompson; Assistant referees: William Torres; Gerson Castellanos; Fourth official: Timothy Debysingh

== Statistics ==
=== Goalscorers ===
There were 17 goals scored in 9 matches, for an average of 1.89 goals per match (as of November 7, 2021).

2 goals

- Miracle Porter – Florida Atlantic

1 goal

- Piper Biziorek – Charlotte
- Haley Shand – Charlotte
- Emma Grissom – Florida Atlantic
- Peyton DePriest – Middle Tennessee
- Morgan Hall – Old Dominion
- Riley Kennett – Old Dominion
- Yuliia Khrystiuck – Old Dominion
- Ece Turkoglu – Old Dominion
- Ariel Diaz – Southern Miss
- Madisyn Flammia – Southern Miss
- Blessing Kingsley – Southern Miss
- Sam Stiglmair – Southern Miss
- Morgan Halliwill – UAB
- Lexxe Lipsey – UAB

1 own goal

- North Texas (vs. UTSA)

== All-Tournament team ==
Player	Team
Carla Morich*	Old Dominion
Emily Roberts^	Old Dominion
Kasey Perry	Old Dominion
Ece Turkoglu	Old Dominion
Peyton DePriest	Middle Tennessee
Caroline Manley	Middle Tennessee
Ariel Diaz	Southern Miss
Ilana Izquierdo	Southern Miss
Kendell Mindnich	Southern Miss
Morgan Halliwill	UAB
Lexxe Lipsey	UAB

* Offensive MVP
^ Defensive MVP
