= 2022 Conference USA women's soccer tournament =

- Classification: Division I
- Teams: 8
- Matches: 7
- Attendance: 864
- Site: Transamerica Field; Charlotte, North Carolina
- Champions: UTSA (1st title)
- Winning coach: Derek Pittman (1st title)
- MVP: Anna Sutter (Offensive); Kendall Kloza (Defensive) (UTSA)
- Broadcast: ESPN+

2022 Conference USA women's soccer standings
	Conf.						Overall
Team	W		L		T	PCT	W		L		T	PCT
Rice ‍†‍‍	9	–	0	–	1	.950	11	–	8	–	1	.575
North Texas ‍‍‍	7	–	2	–	1	.750	12	–	6	–	2	.650
UAB ‍‍‍	6	–	1	–	3	.750	9	–	4	–	5	.639
Louisiana Tech ‍‍‍	5	–	3	–	2	.600	7	–	9	–	3	.447
Florida Atlantic ‍‍‍	5	–	4	–	1	.550	11	–	8	–	3	.568
UTSA ‍‍‡‍^{y}	4	–	3	–	3	.550	12	–	6	–	4	.636
Western Kentucky ‍‍‍	4	–	5	–	1	.450	7	–	9	–	3	.447
Charlotte ‍‍‍	2	–	6	–	2	.300	4	–	11	–	4	.316
Florida International ‍‍‍	1	–	5	–	4	.300	3	–	8	–	4	.333
UTEP ‍‍‍	1	–	7	–	2	.200	4	–	11	–	3	.306
Middle Tennessee ‍‍‍	0	–	8	–	2	.100	2	–	12	–	3	.206
† – Conference champion ‡ – 2022 C-USA Tournament champion y – Invited to the NCAA Tournament; As of December 6, 2022; Rankings from United Soccer Coaches Poll; Source:Conference USA

The 2022 Conference USA women's soccer tournament was the postseason women's soccer tournament for Conference USA held from November 2 through November 6, 2022. The seven-match tournament took place at Transamerica Field in Charlotte, North Carolina. The eight-team single-elimination tournament consisted of three rounds based on seeding from regular season conference play. The defending champions were the Old Dominion Monarchs. Old Dominion was unable to defended their title as they moved to the Sun Belt Conference in 2022. The UTSA Roadrunners won the title by defeating Florida Atlantic 3–2 in overtime the final. The conference championship was the first for the UTSA women's soccer program and first for head coach Derek Pittman. As tournament champions, UTSA earned C-USA's automatic berth into the 2022 NCAA Division I women's soccer tournament.

== Seeding ==
Eight Conference USA schools participated in the tournament. Teams were seeded by conference record. No tiebreakers were required as each team finished with a unique conference regular season record.

Seed	School	Conference Record	Points
1	Rice	9–0–1	28
2	North Texas	7–2–1	22
3	UAB	6–1–3	21
4	Louisiana Tech	5–3–2	17
5	Florida Atlantic	5–3–1	16
6	UTSA	4–3–3	15
7	Western Kentucky	4–5–1	13
8	Charlotte	2–6–2	8

== Bracket ==
Quarterfinals; November 2
2	North Texas	5
7	Western Kentucky	1
3	UAB	0
6	UTSA (a.e.t.)	1
4	Louisiana Tech	1
5	Florida Atlantic	4
1	Rice	1
8	Charlotte	4

Semifinals; November 4
2	North Texas	1
6	UTSA	2
5	Florida Atlantic	2
8	Charlotte	1

Championship; November 6
6	UTSA (a.e.t.)	3
5	Florida Atlantic	2

== Schedule ==
=== Quarterfinals ===
November 2	#2 North Texas	5–1	#7 Western Kentucky	Charlotte, NC
11:00 a.m. ET	Jenna Sheely 15', 30'; Olivia Klein 21'; Madison Drenowatz 47'; Avery Barron (yellow card) 78'; Summer Brown 86'	Report	54' Kayla Meyer; (yellow card) 90' Kendall King	Stadium: Transamerica Field; Referee: Jaime Herrera; Assistant referees: Hayden Oscanoa; Gabriel Rivera; Fourth official: Elvis Osmanovic

November 2	#3 UAB	0–1 (a.e.t.)	#6 UTSA	Charlotte, NC
1:30 p.m. ET	Canby Biddle (yellow card) 53'	Report	(yellow card) 79' Sasjah Dade; 108' Anna Sutter	Stadium: Transamerica Field; Referee: Elvis Osmanovic; Assistant referees: Chris Zuerner; Gabriel Rivera; Fourth official: Brian Miller

November 2	#4 Louisiana Tech	1–4	#5 Florida Atlantic	Charlotte, NC
4:30 p.m. ET	Kalli Matlock 31'; Maci Geltmeier (yellow card) 64'	Report	10', 10' Gi Krstec; (yellow card) 55' Mia Sennes; 62' (pen.) Hailey Landrus; 67' Bri Austin	Stadium: Transamerica Field; Referee: Brian Miller; Assistant referees: Wilmer Soriano; Hayden Oscanoa; Fourth official: Mark Kadlecik

November 2	#1 Rice	1–4	#8 Charlotte	Charlotte, NC
7:00 p.m. ET	Grace Collins 13'	Report	23', 68' Macey Bader; 62' Rice Own Goal; 86' Haley Shand	Stadium: Transamerica Field; Attendance: 336; Referee: Jorge Ramirez; Assistant referees: Skye Arthur-Banning; Eric Usher; Fourth official: Wilmer Soriano

=== Semifinals ===
November 4	#2 North Texas	1–2	#6 UTSA	Charlotte, NC
4:30 p.m. ET	Madison Drenowatz 60'; Team (yellow card) 69'	Report	9' Jordan Walker; 31' Kendall Kloza; (yellow card) 63' Sasjah Dade	Stadium: Transamerica Field; Referee: Shane Butler; Assistant referees: Chris Zuerner; Eric Usher; Fourth official: Marc Lawrence

November 4	#5 Florida Atlantic	2–1	#8 Charlotte	Charlotte, NC
7:00 p.m. ET	Thelma Hermannsdottir 20'; Bri Austin 62'	Report	13' Haley Shand; (yellow card) 22' Team; (yellow card) 78' Julia Patrum	Stadium: Transamerica Field; Attendance: 439; Referee: Alexandra Billeter; Assistant referees: Wilmer Soriano; Gabriel Rivera; Fourth official: Jorge Ramirez

=== Final ===
November 6	#5 Florida Atlantic	2–3 (a.e.t.)	#6 UTSA	Charlotte, NC
1:00 p.m. ET	Morgan McDonald 55'; Elin Simonardottir 68'; Mia Sennes (yellow card) 79'	Report	(yellow card) 19' Sabrina Hillyer; 32', 92' Marlee Fray; 36' Kiran Singh; (yellow card) 77' Sasjah Dade	Stadium: Transamerica Field; Attendance: 89; Referee: Mark Kadlecik; Assistant referees: Kayla Polonsky; Jordan Davis; Fourth official: Gabriel Rivera

== Statistics ==
=== Goalscorers ===
There were 28 goals scored in 7 matches, for an average of 4 goals per match (as of November 6, 2022).

2 goals

- Macey Bader – Charlotte
- Haley Shand – Charlotte
- Bri Austin – Florida Atlantic
- Gi Krstec – Florida Atlantic
- Madison Drenowatz – North Texas
- Jenna Sheely – North Texas
- Marlee Fray – UTSA

1 goal

- Thelma Hermannsdottir – Florida Atlantic
- Hailey Landrus – Florida Atlantic
- Morgan McDonald – Florida Atlantic
- Elin Simonardottir – Florida Atlantic
- Kalli Matlock – Louisiana Tech
- Summer Brown – North Texas
- Olivia Klein – North Texas
- Grace Collins – Rice
- Kendal Kloza – UTSA
- Kiran Singh – UTSA
- Anna Sutter – UTSA
- Jordan Walker – UTSA
- Kayla Meyer – Western Kentucky

1 own goal

- Rice (vs. Charlotte)

== All-Tournament team ==
Player	Team
Anna Sutter*	UTSA
Kendall Kloza^	UTSA
Marlee Fray	UTSA
Mia Krusinski	UTSA
Gi Krstec	Florida Atlantic
Hailey Landrus	Florida Atlantic
Thelma Hermannsdottir	Florida Atlantic
Macey Bader	Charlotte
Haley Shand	Charlotte
Madi Drenowatz	North Texas
Jenna Sheely	North Texas

* Offensive MVP
^ Defensive MVP
