= American Conference women's soccer tournament =

- Conference soccer championship
- Sport: College soccer
- Conference: American
- Number of teams: 8
- Format: Single-elimination
- Played: 2013–present
- Last contest: 2026
- Current champion: UAB (1st title)
- Most championships: Memphis (4)
- TV partner: ESPN+
- Official website: theamerican.org//wsoc

The American Conference women's soccer tournament is the conference championship tournament in soccer for the American Conference (known before the 2025 season as the American Athletic Conference). The tournament has been held every year since the split from the Big East Conference in 2013. It is a single-elimination tournament and seeding is based on regular season records. The winner, declared conference champion, receives the conference's automatic bid to the NCAA Division I Women's Soccer Championship.

== Format ==
The teams are seeded based on the order of finish in the conference's round robin regular season. Tiebreakers begin with the result of the head-to-head matchup. The teams are then placed in a single-elimination bracket, with the top seed playing the lowest seed, until meeting in a final championship game. After two overtime period, ties are broken by shootout rounds, with the winner of the shootout advancing.

== Champions ==
Key

- (1) – Title number
- a.e.t. – Match went to extra time
- p – Match decided by a penalty shootout after extra time
- – Winning team won regular season
- – Winning team won National Championship

=== By year ===
Ed.	Year	Champion	Score	Runner-up	Venue	City	MOP (offense)	MOP (defense)
1	2013	UCF (1)	0–0 (8–7 p)	Rutgers	UCF Soccer and Track Stadium	Orlando, FL	Tatiana Coleman, UCF	Jessica Janosz, Rutgers
2	2014	Connecticut (1)	0–0 (3–2 p)	South Florida	Corbett Soccer Stadium	Tampa, FL	Rachel Hill, Connecticut	Emily Armstrong, Connecticut
3	2015	Cincinnati (1)	1–1 (4–2 p)	South Florida	Westcott Field	Dallas, TX	Jaycie Brown, Cincinnati	Vanessa Gilles, Cincinnati
4	2016	Connecticut (2)	1–0	SMU	Morrone Stadium	Storrs, CT	Rachel Hill, Connecticut	Toriana Paterson, Connecticut
5	2017	South Florida (1)	0–0 (5–4 p)	UCF	UCF Soccer and Track Stadium	Orlando, FL	Evelyne Viens, South Florida	Kat Elliott, South Florida
6	2018	Memphis (1)	3–0	USF	Corbett Soccer Stadium	Tampa, FL	Clarissa Larise, Memphis	Chanel Hudson-Marks, Memphis
7	2019	South Florida (2)	2–1	Memphis	Billy J. Murphy Track & Soccer Complex	Memphis, Tennessee	Evelyne Viens, South Florida	Sydney Martinez, South Florida
8	2020	South Florida (3)	4–0	Cincinnati	Corbett Soccer Stadium	Tampa, FL	Sydny Nasello, South Florida	Sydney Martinez, South Florida
9	2021	Memphis (2)	0–0 (3–0 p)	South Florida	Corbett Soccer Stadium	Tampa, FL	Saorla Miller, Memphis	Elizabeth Moberg, Memphis
10	2022	Memphis (3)	1–0 (a.e.t.)	SMU	UCF Soccer and Track Stadium	Orlando, FL	Shae Taylor, Memphis	Claire Wyville, Memphis
11	2023	Memphis (4)	2–1	SMU	Premier Sports Campus	Lakewood Ranch, FL	Mya Jones, Memphis	Sarah Hagg, Memphis
12	2024	East Carolina (1)	1–0 (a.e.t.)	Memphis	Premier Sports Campus	Lakewood Ranch, FL	Annabelle Abbott, East Carolina	Maeve English, East Carolina
13	2025	UTSA (1)	1–0 (a.e.t.)	Rice	Premier Sports Campus	Lakewood Ranch, FL	Bri Carrigan, UTSA	Jasmine Kessler, UTSA
14	2026	UAB (1)	1–0 (a.e.t.)	Memphis	Premier Sports Campus	Lakewood Ranch, FL	Vita Naihin, UAB	Abby Graeser, UAB

=== By school ===
This table of championship statistics is updated after each event. It is current as of the end of the 2026 Tournament.

School	App.	W	L	T	Pct.	Finals	Titles	Winning years
Charlotte	4	2	4	0	.333	0	0	
Cincinnati	8	3	6	2	.364	2	1	2015
Connecticut	5	5	3	1	.611	2	2	2014, 2016
East Carolina	9	4	8	2	.357	1	1	2024
Florida Atlantic	2	1	2	0	.333	0	0	
Houston	3	0	3	0	.000	0	0	
Louisville	1	0	1	0	.000	0	0	
Memphis	14	19	9	2	.667	7	4	2018, 2021, 2022, 2023
North Texas	2	0	2	0	.000	0	0	
Rice	3	3	3	1	.500	1	0	
Rutgers	1	1	0	2	.667	1	0	
SMU	9	10	7	2	.579	3	0	
South Florida	13	14	5	7	.673	6	3	2017, 2019, 2020
Temple	5	0	5	0	.000	0	0	
Tulsa	5	0	5	0	.000	0	0	
UAB	4	3	3	0	.500	1	1	2026
UCF	9	6	5	5	.531	3	1	2013
UTSA	2	2	1	1	.625	1	1	2025

Teams in italics no longer sponsor women's soccer in the American.
