= 2019 Conference USA women's soccer tournament =

- Classification: Division I
- Teams: 8
- Matches: 7
- Attendance: 1,314
- Site: Mean Green Soccer Complex; Denton, Texas
- Champions: North Texas (4th title)
- Winning coach: John Hedlund (4th title)
- MVP: Allie Byrd (Offensive); Dominique James (Defensive) (North Texas)
- Broadcast: ESPN+

2019 Conference USA women's soccer standings
	Conf.						Overall
Team	W		L		T	PCT	W		L		T	PCT
Florida Atlantic ‍†‍‍	8	–	1	–	1	.850	15	–	4	–	2	.762
North Texas ‍‍‡‍^{y}	7	–	2	–	1	.750	15	–	6	–	1	.705
Rice ‍‍‍	6	–	1	–	3	.750	10	–	6	–	3	.605
Charlotte ‍‍‍	7	–	3	–	0	.700	13	–	6	–	0	.684
Western Kentucky ‍‍‍	6	–	4	–	0	.600	10	–	7	–	1	.583
Louisiana Tech ‍‍‍	5	–	4	–	1	.550	13	–	4	–	3	.725
UTEP ‍‍‍	5	–	4	–	1	.550	10	–	7	–	3	.575
Middle Tennessee ‍‍‍	5	–	4	–	1	.550	8	–	10	–	1	.447
Old Dominion ‍‍‍	4	–	4	–	2	.500	10	–	4	–	4	.667
UTSA ‍‍‍	4	–	6	–	0	.400	8	–	8	–	1	.500
UAB ‍‍‍	2	–	5	–	3	.350	4	–	7	–	6	.412
Southern Miss ‍‍‍	2	–	7	–	1	.250	7	–	10	–	1	.417
Marshall ‍‍‍	2	–	8	–	0	.200	4	–	14	–	0	.222
FIU ‍‍‍	0	–	10	–	0	.000	0	–	2	–	15	.441
† – Conference champion ‡ – 2019 C-USA Tournament champion y – Invited to the NCAA tournament As of December 9, 2019; Rankings from United Soccer Coaches Poll; Source:Conference USA

The 2019 Conference USA women's soccer tournament was the postseason women's soccer tournament for Conference USA held from November 6 through November 10, 2019. The seven-match tournament took place at Mean Green Soccer Complex in Denton, Texas. The eight-team single-elimination tournament consisted of three rounds based on seeding from regular season conference play. The defending champions were the North Texas Mean Green, who defended their title after defeating the Florida Atlantic Owls in the final. The conference championship was the fourth for the North Texas women's soccer program, all four of which have come under the direction of head coach John Hedlund.

== Bracket ==
Quarterfinals; Wednesday, Nov. 6
1	Florida Atlantic	0 (4)
8	Louisiana Tech	0 (3)
4	Charlotte	2
5	Western Kentucky	1
3	Rice	4
6	Middle Tennessee	2
2	North Texas	3
7	UTEP	1

Semifinals; Friday, Nov. 8
1	Florida Atlantic	4^{2OT}
4	Charlotte	3
3	Rice	0
2	North Texas	2

Final; Sunday, Nov. 10
1	Florida Atlantic	2
2	North Texas	5

== Schedule ==
=== Quarterfinals ===
November 6, 2019	#1 Florida Atlantic	0–0 (a.e.t.) (4–3 p)	#8 Louisiana Tech	Denton, TX
11:30 a.m. CST	Alex Maxon (yellow card) 76'; Mary O'Hara (yellow card) 99'	Report	(yellow card) 41' Autumn Woodard	Stadium: Mean Green Soccer Complex
	Penalties
	Sammy Vitols (penalty scored); Pernille Velta (penalty scored); Luisa Daikeler (penalty scored); Tiril Haga (penalty scored)		(penalty scored) Gabrielle Parent; (penalty scored) Christina Hjelvik; (penalty missed) Jaelyn Peeples; (penalty scored) Sophie Fijneman; (penalty missed) Elizabeth Doll

November 6, 2019	#4 Charlotte	2–1	#5 Western Kentucky	Denton, TX
2:00 p.m. CST	Megan Greene 39', 61'	Report	21' Chandler Backes	Stadium: Mean Green Soccer Complex

November 6, 2019	#3 Rice	4–2	#6 Middle Tennessee	Denton, TX
5:50 p.m. CST	Sydney Miller (yellow card) 35'; Haley Kostyshyn 46', 48'; Lianne Mananquil 49'; Madison Kent 78'	Report	7', 87' Peyton DePriest; (yellow card) 68' Carolin Engelhard; (yellow card) 84' Taylor Hatch	Stadium: Mean Green Soccer Complex

November 6, 2019	#2 North Texas	3–1	#7 UTEP	Denton, TX
9:22 p.m. CST	Berklee Peters 19', 62'; Desiree Ramirez 42'	Report	24' Jackie Soto; (yellow card) 49' Team	Stadium: Mean Green Soccer Complex; Attendance: 341

=== Semifinals ===
November 8, 2019	#1 Florida Atlantic	4–3 (a.e.t.)	#4 Charlotte	Denton, TX
4:30 p.m. CST	Pernille Velta 6'; Mary O'Hara 12'; Tiril Haga 22'; Elisha Holmes 103'	Report	47', 57' Ashton McKane; 69' Ari Maibodi	Stadium: Mean Green Soccer Complex

November 8, 2019	#2 North Texas	2–0	#3 Rice	Denton, TX
7:00 p.m. CST	Allie Byrd 78'; Berklee Peters 84'	Report		Stadium: Mean Green Soccer Complex; Attendance: 433

=== Final ===
November 10, 2019	#1 Florida Atlantic	2–5	#2 North Texas	Denton, TX
12:00 p.m. CST	Elisha Holmes 18'; Sammy Vitols 31'	Report	(yellow card) 12' Dominique James; 12', (yellow card) 54' Natalie Newell; 37' Olivia Klein; 54' Logan Bruffett; 57', 71' Allie Byrd	Stadium: Mean Green Soccer Complex; Attendance: 540

== Statistics ==
=== Goalscorers ===
3 Goals

- Allie Byrd (North Texas)
- Berklee Peters (North Texas)

2 Goals

- Peyton DePriest (Middle Tennessee)
- Megan Greene (Charlotte)
- Elisha Holmes (Florida Atlantic)
- Haley Kostyshyn (Rice)
- Ashton McKane (Charlotte)

1 Goal

- Chandler Backes (Western Kentucky)
- Logan Bruffett (North Texas)
- Tiril Haga (Florida Atlantic)
- Madison Kent (Rice)
- Olivia Klein (North Texas)
- Ari Maibodi (Charlotte)
- Lianne Mananquil (Rice)
- Natalie Newell (North Texas)
- Mary O'Hara (Florida Atlantic)
- Desiree Ramirez (North Texas)
- Jackie Soto (UTEP)
- Pernille Velta (Florida Atlantic)
- Sammy Vitols (Florida Atlantic)

== All-Tournament team ==
Player	Team
**Allie Byrd**	North Texas
Dominique James	North Texas
Brooke Lampe	North Texas
Natalie Newell	North Texas
Elisha Holmes	Florida Atlantic
Jessica Monteiro	Florida Atlantic
Pernille Velta	Florida Atlantic
Haley Kostyshyn	Rice
Lianne Mananquil	Rice
Jamie Fankhauser	Charlotte
Riley Orr	Charlotte

Note: Offensive MVP shown in bold, defensive MVP shown in italics.

== See also ==
- 2019 Conference USA Men's Soccer Tournament
