= Nyah Rose =

Canadian soccer player (born 2005)

- Rose with Florida State in 2026

Personal information
- Full name: Nyah Margaret Rose
- Date of birth: April 4, 2005 (age 21)
- Place of birth: Markham, Ontario, Canada
- Height: 1.70 m (5 ft 7 in)
- Position: Forward

Team information
- Current team: Florida State Seminoles

Youth career
- Unionville Milliken SC
- NDC Ontario

College career
Years	Team	Apps	(Gls)
2023–2025	SMU Mustangs	43	(20)
2026–	Florida State Seminoles	10	(0)

Senior career*
Years	Team	Apps	(Gls)
2022–2023	NDC Ontario	17	(3)

International career^{‡}
2022	Canada U17	7	(0)
2023–	Canada U20	10	(5)
2024–	Canada	3	(0)
- * Club domestic league appearances and goals ‡ National team caps and goals as of April 4, 2025

Nyah Margaret Rose (born April 4, 2005) is a Canadian college soccer player who plays as a forward for the Florida State Seminoles and the Canada national team. She previously played for the SMU Mustangs.

== Early life ==
Rose started playing youth soccer with Unionville Milliken SC at age four. She won gold with Ontario at the 2022 Canada Summer Games. Rose formerly played as a centre back before being converted to forward.

== College career ==
In 2023, Rose began attending Southern Methodist University, where she played for the women's soccer team. She scored her first collegiate goal on August 27, 2023 against the Tennessee Lady Volunteers. On August 31, 2023, she scored a hat trick in a 3-1 victory over the Stephen F. Austin Ladyjacks. In September 2023, she was named the AAC Freshman of the Week, and the following week was named the AAC Offensive Player of the Week. In her first season, she led the AAC in goals with 11. At the end of the season, she was named the AAC Co-Rookie of the Year, and named to the All-AAC First Team, the AAC All-Rookie Team, the AAC All-Tournament Team, and the All-South Region First Team.

Ahead of the 2024 season, she was named to the MAC Hermann Trophy Watch List. At the end of the season, she was named to the All-ACC Third Team. She transferred to the Florida State Seminoles for her senior season in 2026.

== Club career ==
In 2022 and 2023, she played with NDC Ontario in League1 Ontario.

== International career ==
Rose trained with Canada's youth national set-up from the age of 14 in 2019. She was named to the Canada U17 squad for the 2022 CONCACAF Women's U-17 Championship, winning the bronze medal. She was later named to the Canada U20 team for the 2023 CONCACAF Women's U-20 Championship, winning bronze. She was then named to the squad for the 2024 FIFA U-20 Women's World Cup, where she scored Canada's first goal of the tournament in a 3–3 draw against France U20.

In late November 2024, Rose was called up to the senior national team for the first time ahead of a pair of international friendlies. She made her debut on December 3 against South Korea.

== Personal life ==
She is the younger sister of fellow soccer player Jade Rose.

== Honors ==
Individual

- Third-team All-ACC: 2024
- First-team All-AAC: 2023
- AAC Co-Rookie of the Year: 2023
- AAC tournament all-tournament team: 2023
