= Macey Bader =

American soccer player (born 2003)

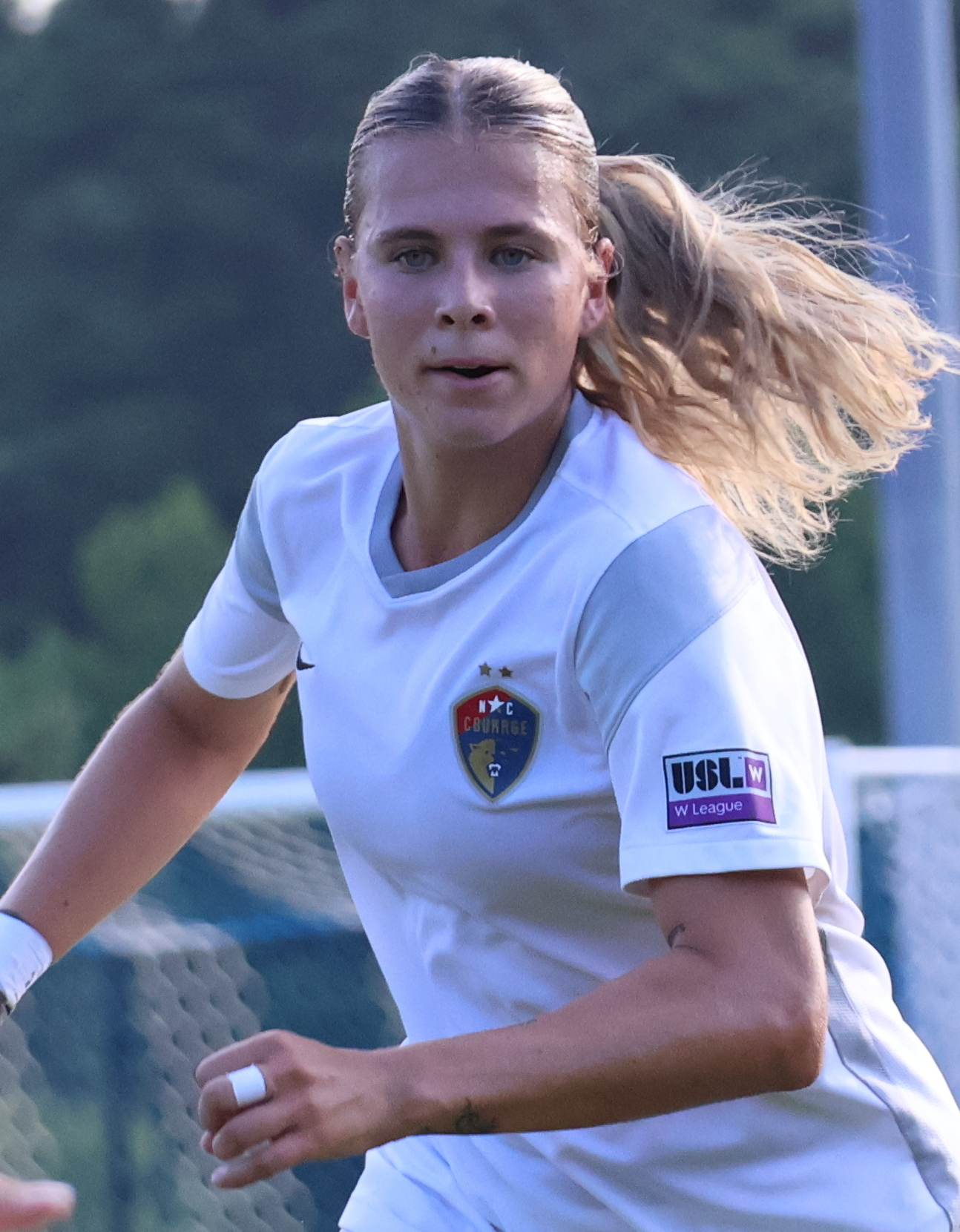
- Bader with the North Carolina Courage U23 in 2024

Personal information
- Full name: Macey Elise Bader
- Date of birth: February 7, 2003 (age 23)
- Height: 5 ft 6 in (1.68 m)
- Position: Forward

Team information
- Current team: Viktoria Plzeň
- Number: 23

Youth career
- North Carolina Courage

College career
Years	Team	Apps	(Gls)
2021–2024	Charlotte 49ers	73	(17)

Senior career*
Years	Team	Apps	(Gls)
2022–2025	North Carolina Courage U23	41	(18)
2025–2026	Carolina Ascent	2	(0)
2026–	Viktoria Plzeň	6	(4)
- * Club domestic league appearances and goals as of October 17, 2026

Macey Elise Bader (born February 7, 2003) is an American professional soccer player who plays as a forward for Czech Women's First League club Viktoria Plzeň. She played college soccer for the Charlotte 49ers. She began her professional career with USL Super League club Carolina Ascent in 2025.

== Early life ==
Bader grew up in Apex, North Carolina, the daughter of Lita and Dewan Bader. Her father played indoor soccer professionally, and she has two younger siblings who played soccer in college. She attended Apex Friendship High School, where she earned all-conference honors as a sophomore after leading the league in assists. She played ECNL soccer for the North Carolina Courage Academy, twice serving as team captain. She was called into virtual training camp for the youth national team in 2021.

== College career ==
Bader played in 73 games for the Charlotte 49ers, scoring 17 goals and dishing 12 assists. In her sophomore year in 2022, she scored twice against top-seeded Rice in the Conference USA tournament was named in the all-tournament team. In her junior year in 2023, with Charlotte's move to the American Athletic Conference, she scored twice against East Carolina in the AAC tournament and was named in the all-tournament team. In her senior year in 2024, she earned first-team All-AAC honors after leading the 49ers in scoring with 5 goals, matching her career high from the previous season.

During college, Bader also played for the North Carolina Courage U23 in the amateur USL W League, scoring 18 goals in 41 games. After losing in the national final in 2023, she helped the Courage win the national title in 2024. She was named the championship MVP after providing a goal and an assist in the win over the Colorado Storm.

== Club career ==
Carolina Ascent FC announced on July 14, 2025, that Bader had signed her first professional contract with the club, remaining in Charlotte for the second season of the USL Super League. She made her professional debut on October 10, coming on as a stoppage-time substitute for Riley Parker in a 1–1 draw with Lexington SC. She made 2 appearances for the club.

On August 21, 2026, Bader was announced at Czech club Viktoria Plzeň. She debuted for the club the following day, making her first professional start in a 1–0 defeat to the Prague Raptors. She scored her first professional goals on September 5, scoring both goals in a 2–0 victory over Lokomotiva Brno.

== Honors and awards ==
North Carolina Courage U23

- USL W League: 2024

Individual

- First-team All-AAC: 2024
- USL W League final MVP: 2024
- AAC tournament all-tournament team: 2023
- Conference USA tournament all-tournament team: 2022
