= 2023 American Athletic Conference women's soccer tournament =

- Classification: Division I
- Teams: 8
- Matches: 7
- Attendance: 979
- Site: Premier Sports Campus; Lakewood Ranch, Florida
- Champions: Memphis (4th title)
- Winning coach: Brooks Monaghan (4th title)
- MVP: Mya Jones (Offensive); Sarah Hagg (Defensive) (Memphis)
- Broadcast: ESPN+ ESPNU (Final)

2023 American Athletic Conference women's soccer standings
	Conf.						Overall
Team	W		L		T	PCT	W		L		T	PCT
East
South Florida ‍‍‍	6	–	1	–	2	.778	10	–	6	–	2	.611
East Carolina ‍‍‍	4	–	2	–	3	.611	9	–	5	–	5	.605
Charlotte ‍‍‍	4	–	3	–	2	.556	9	–	7	–	4	.550
Florida Atlantic ‍‍‍	3	–	3	–	3	.500	8	–	7	–	5	.525
UAB ‍‍‍	2	–	3	–	4	.444	6	–	7	–	5	.472
Temple ‍‍‍	0	–	9	–	0	.000	2	–	13	–	3	.194
West
No. 10 Memphis ‍†‍‡‍^{y}	9	–	0	–	0	1.000	20	–	2	–	0	.909
SMU ‍‍‍	5	–	3	–	1	.611	11	–	6	–	1	.639
Tulsa ‍‍‍	3	–	2	–	4	.556	5	–	9	–	5	.395
North Texas ‍‍‍	2	–	4	–	3	.389	8	–	5	–	3	.594
UTSA ‍‍‍	2	–	4	–	3	.389	7	–	7	–	4	.500
Rice ‍‍‍	1	–	7	–	1	.167	3	–	13	–	2	.222
† – Conference champion ‡ – 2023 AAC Tournament champion y – Invited to the NCAA Tournament; As of December 5, 2023; Rankings from United Soccer Coaches Poll; Source: American Athletic Conference

The 2023 American Athletic Conference women's soccer tournament was the postseason women's soccer tournament for the American Athletic Conference held from October 31 to November 5, 2023. The tournament was hosted at the Premier Sports Campus located in Lakewood Ranch, Florida. The eight-team single-elimination tournament consisted of three rounds based on seeding from regular season conference play. The Memphis Tigers are the defending tournament champions. Memphis successfully defended its title, defeating UAB in the First Round, Charlotte in the Semifinals and SMU in the Final. Memphis' win was the program's fourth and also the fourth for coach Brooks Monaghan. This title was Memphis' third in a row. As tournament champions, Memphis earned the American's automatic berth into the 2023 NCAA Division I Women's Soccer Tournament.

== Seeding ==
The top eight teams in the regular season earned a spot in the tournament. No tiebreakers were required as the top eight teams in conference play finished with unique point totals. Five teams from the East Division qualified while only three teams from the West Division qualified.

Seed	School	Conference Record	Points
1	Memphis	9–0–0	27
2	South Florida	6–1–2	20
3	SMU	5–3–1	16
4	East Carolina	4–2–3	15
5	Charlotte	4–3–2	14
6	Tulsa	3–2–4	13
7	Florida Atlantic	3–3–3	12
8	UAB	2–3–4	10

== Bracket ==
First Round; Tuesday, Oct. 31
1	Memphis	2
8	UAB	1
4	East Carolina	0
5	Charlotte	5
3	SMU	2
6	Tulsa	1
2	South Florida	0
7	Florida Atlantic	1

Semifinals; Thursday, Nov. 2
1	Memphis	2
5	Charlotte	0
3	SMU	3
7	Florida Atlantic	0

Final; Sunday, Nov. 5
1	Memphis	2
3	SMU	1

== Schedule ==
=== First Round ===
October 31	#1 Memphis	2–1	#8 UAB	Lakewood Ranch, FL
11:00 a.m.	Sarah Hagg (yellow card) 34'; Honoka Hamano (yellow card) 51'; Anne-Valérie Seto 61'; Finley Lavin (yellow card) 70'; Saorla Miller 88'	Report	8' Jolie St. Louis	Stadium: Premier Sports Campus; Attendance: 114; Referee: Jennifer Dumaine; Assistant referees: Tony Obas; Albert Franklin; Fourth official: Emily Gomez

October 31	#4 East Carolina	0–5	#5 Charlotte	Lakewood Ranch, FL
1:30 p.m.		Report	1', 54' Macey Bader; 24' Braelynn Francher; 25' Julia Patrum; 74' Ayanna Parker	Stadium: Premier Sports Campus; Attendance: 104; Referee: Matthew Miscannon; Assistant referees: Preston Joyner; Will Franklin; Fourth official: Albert Franklin

October 31	#3 SMU	2–1	#6 Tulsa	Lakewood Ranch, FL
4:30 p.m.	Abby Dermott (yellow card) 52'; Nyah Rose 54', 71', (yellow card) 63'; Maura Yumul (yellow card) 87'	Report	77' Jordan Frederick	Stadium: Premier Sports Campus; Attendance: 137; Referee: Jaclyn Metz; Assistant referees: John Ocampo; Emily Gomez; Fourth official: Tony Obas

October 31	#2 South Florida	0–1	#7 Florida Atlantic	Lakewood Ranch, FL
7:00 p.m.	Vivianne Bessette (yellow card) 42'; Serita Thurton (yellow card) 47'; Team (yellow card) 48'	Report	(yellow card) 45' Drew Dempsey; 64' Molly Setsma; (yellow card) 67' Olivia Bori	Stadium: Premier Sports Campus; Referee: Melinda Sopka; Assistant referees: Albert Excovar; Joseph Radzialowski; Fourth official: Will Franklin

=== Semifinals ===
November 2	#1 Memphis	2–0	#5 Charlotte	Lakewood Ranch, FL
4:00 p.m.	Anna Hauer 32'; Team (yellow card) 65'; Momo Nakao (yellow card) 66'; Delaney Tellex (yellow card) 73'; Mya Jones 80' (pen.)	Report	(yellow card) 87' Julia Patrum; (yellow card) 88' Ayanna Parker	Stadium: Premier Sports Campus; Attendance: 117; Referee: Meghan Mullen; Assistant referees: Tony Obas; Will Franklin; Fourth official: Jennifer Dumaine

November 2	#3 SMU	3–0	#7 Florida Atlantic	Lakewood Ranch, FL
7:00 p.m.	Wayny Balata 3', 9'; Eliana Salama 81'	Report	(yellow card) 51' Madison Micioni	Stadium: Premier Sports Campus; Attendance: 238; Referee: Cory Richardson; Assistant referees: Albert Franklin; Emily Gomez; Fourth official: Melinda Sopka

=== Final ===
November 5	#1 Memphis	2–1	#3 SMU	Lakewood Ranch, FL
2:00 p.m.	Finley Lavin (yellow card) 29'; Ashley Henderson 40'; Delaney Tellex 72', (yellow card) 79'	Report	79' Truth Byars	Stadium: Premier Sports Campus; Attendance: 269; Referee: Amber O'Connor; Assistant referees: Jade Mallea; Emily Gomez; Fourth official: Matthew Miscannon

== Statistics ==
=== Goalscorers ===
There were 20 goals scored in 7 matches, for an average of 2.86 goals per match (as of November 5, 2023).

2 goals

- Macey Bader – Charlotte
- Wayny Balata – SMU
- Nyah Rose – SMU

1 goal

- Braelynn Francher – Charlotte
- Julia Patrum – Charlotte
- Ayanna Parker – Charlotte
- Molly Setsma – Florida Atlantic
- Anna Hauer – Memphis
- Ashley Henderson – Memphis
- Mya Jones – Memphis
- Saorla Miller – Memphis
- Anne-Valérie Seto – Memphis
- Delaney Tellex – Memphis
- Truth Byars – SMU
- Eliana Salama – SMU
- Jordan Frederick – Tulsa
- Jolie St. Louis – UAB

== All-Tournament team ==
Player	Team
Macey Bader	Charlotte
Molly Setsma	Florida Atlantic
Kaylie Bierman	Memphis
Sarah Hagg^	Memphis
Mya Jones*	Memphis
Momo Nakao	Memphis
Delaney Tellex	Memphis
Peyton Annen	SMU
Wayny Balata	SMU
Nyah Rose	SMU
Eliana Salama	SMU

* Offensive MVP
^ Defensive MVP
