= 2025 American Conference women's soccer tournament =

- Classification: Division I
- Teams: 8
- Matches: 7
- Attendance: 2,021
- Site: Premier Sports Campus; Lakewood Ranch, Florida
- Champions: UTSA (1st title)
- Winning coach: Derek Pittman (1st title)
- MVP: Bri Carrigan (Offensive); Jasmine Kessler (Defensive) (UTSA)
- Broadcast: ESPN+ ESPNU (Final)

2025 American Conference women's soccer standings
| | Conf. | | | | | | Overall |
| Team | W | | L | | T | PCT | W | | L | | T | PCT |
|---|---|---|---|---|---|---|---|---|---|---|---|---|
| No. 18 Memphis ‍†‍‍^{y} | 9 | – | 0 | – | 1 | .950 | 17 | – | 1 | – | 3 | .881 |
| Charlotte ‍‍‍ | 6 | – | 2 | – | 2 | .700 | 10 | – | 6 | – | 2 | .611 |
| Tulsa ‍‍‍ | 4 | – | 3 | – | 3 | .550 | 9 | – | 6 | – | 5 | .575 |
| UAB ‍‍‍ | 4 | – | 3 | – | 3 | .550 | 7 | – | 6 | – | 6 | .526 |
| UTSA ‍‍‡‍^{y} | 4 | – | 3 | – | 3 | .550 | 10 | – | 6 | – | 6 | .591 |
| Rice ‍‍‍ | 3 | – | 2 | – | 5 | .550 | 10 | – | 4 | – | 6 | .650 |
| South Florida ‍‍‍ | 4 | – | 4 | – | 2 | .500 | 9 | – | 8 | – | 3 | .525 |
| East Carolina ‍‍‍ | 4 | – | 4 | – | 2 | .500 | 6 | – | 8 | – | 4 | .444 |
| North Texas ‍‍‍ | 2 | – | 5 | – | 3 | .350 | 6 | – | 10 | – | 4 | .400 |
| Florida Atlantic ‍‍‍ | 1 | – | 7 | – | 2 | .200 | 4 | – | 12 | – | 3 | .289 |
| Temple ‍‍‍ | 1 | – | 9 | – | 0 | .100 | 4 | – | 15 | – | 0 | .211 |
† – Conference champion ‡ – 2025 American Tournament champion y – Invited to the NCAA Tournament; As of December 9, 2025; Rankings from United Soccer Coaches Poll; Source:American Conference

The 2025 American Conference women's soccer tournament was the postseason women's soccer tournament for the American Conference held from November 3 to November 9, 2025. The tournament was hosted at the Premier Sports Campus located in Lakewood Ranch, Florida. This was the first conference tournament to be held under the "American Conference" name. On July 21, 2025, the conference dropped the word "Athletic" from its name, becoming simply the American Conference. The eight-team single-elimination tournament consisted of three rounds based on seeding from regular season conference play. The East Carolina Pirates were the defending tournament champions. East Carolina was unable to defend its title. They fell to first seed Memphis in the Quarterfinals. Fifth-seed UTSA finished as tournament champions, defeating sixth-seed Rice 1–0 in overtime the Final. UTSA's win was the program's first and also the first for eighth-year head coach Derek Pittman. As tournament champions, UTSA earned the American's automatic berth into the 2025 NCAA Division I women's soccer tournament.

== Seeding ==
The top eight teams in the regular season earned a spot in the tournament. Teams were seeded based on their regular season conference records. A three-way tiebreaker was required to determine the third through fifth seeds as Tulsa, UAB, and UTSA all finished with identical 4–3–3 records in conference play and fifteen total conference points. Tulsa defeated both UAB and UTSA during the regular season and was awarded the third seed. UAB and UTSA tied their regular season match-up 1–1 on September 25. After further tiebreakers, UAB was the fourth seed and UTSA was the fifth seed. A second three-way tiebreaker was required as East Carolina, Rice, and South Florida all finished with fourteen conference points. Rice defeated South Florida and tied East Carolina during the regular season. South Florida defeated East Carolina and tied with Rice ruing the regular season. East Carolina lost to South Florida and tied Rice during the regular season. After the tiebreakers, Rice was the sixth seed, South Florida was the seventh seed, and East Carolina was the eighth seed.

| Seed | School | Conference Record | Points |
|---|---|---|---|
| 1 | Memphis | 9–0–1 | 28 |
| 2 | Charlotte | 6–2–2 | 20 |
| 3 | Tulsa | 4–3–3 | 15 |
| 4 | UAB | 4–3–3 | 15 |
| 5 | UTSA | 4–3–3 | 15 |
| 6 | Rice | 3–2–5 | 14 |
| 7 | South Florida | 4–4–2 | 14 |
| 8 | East Carolina | 4–4–2 | 14 |

== Bracket ==
First Round; Monda, Nov. 3
1 | Memphis | 1
8 | East Carolina | 0
4 | UAB | 1
5 | UTSA | 2
3 | Tulsa | 0
6 | Rice | 1
2 | Charlotte | 0
7 | South Florida | 3

Semifinals; Thursday, Nov. 6
1 | Memphis | 3 (1)
5 | USTA (pen.) | 3 (3)
6 | Rice (pen.) | 0 (3)
7 | South Florida | 0 (1)

Final; Sunday, Nov. 9
5 | USTA (a.e.t.) | 1
6 | Rice | 0

== Schedule ==
=== Quarterfinals ===
| November 3 | (2) Charlotte | 0–3 | (7) South Florida | Lakewood Ranch, FL |
| 11:00 a.m. EST | Megan Bradley (yellow card) 75' | Report | 6' (pen.) Sadie Sider-Echenberg; 16' Noelle Sather; (yellow card) 33' Micahela Hill; (yellow card) 41' Leire Herraez Gallach; 53' Sophia Cabral; (yellow card) 79' Emily Lemke | Stadium: Premier Sports Campus; Attendance: 229; Referee: Jennifer Dumaine; Assistant referees: Estefania Estrada; Daniel Va; Fourth official: Corey Rockwell |

| November 3 | (3) Tulsa | 0–1 | (6) Rice | Lakewood Ranch, FL |
| 2:00 p.m. EST | Jordan Frederick (yellow card) 63'; Lauren McIntyre (yellow card) 82' | Report | (yellow card) 5' Leah Chancey; 59' Eileen Albers | Stadium: Premier Sports Campus; Attendance: 207; Referee: Corey Rockwell; Assistant referees: Jade Mallea; Laura Chambers Waliski; Fourth official: Estefania Estrada |

| November 3 | (4) UAB | 1–2 | (5) UTSA | Lakewood Ranch, FL |
| 5:00 p.m. EST | Lailah Stewart 79' | Report | 31' Michelle Polo; (yellow card) 43' Bryn Maxwell; 57' Aaliyaiah Durden; (yellow card) 73' Zoë May; (yellow card) 81' Rylee Miller | Stadium: Premier Sports Campus; Attendance: 189; Referee: Cory Richardson; Assistant referees: Jade Mallea; Daniel Va; Fourth official: Jennifer Dumaine |

| November 3 | (1) Memphis | 1–0 | (8) East Carolina | Lakewood Ranch, FL |
| 7:30 p.m. EST | Ashley Henderson 87' | Report | | Stadium: Premier Sports Campus; Attendance: 339; Referee: Laura Chambers Waliski; Assistant referees: Preston Joyner; Cory Richardson |

=== Semifinals ===
| November 6 | (6) Rice | 0–0 (a.e.t.) (6–5 p) | (7) South Florida | Lakewood Ranch, FL |
| 4:00 p.m. EST | Carsyn Martz (yellow card) 106' | Report | | Stadium: Premier Sports Campus; Attendance: 279; Referee: Kyile Rhodes; Assistant referees: Laura Chambers Waliski; Fritz Barberousse; Fourth official: Sebastian Ocampo |
| | Penalties |
| | Eileen Albers (penalty missed); Piper Biziorek (penalty scored); Sophie Zhang (penalty scored); Leah Chancey (penalty scored); Lilly Reuscher (penalty scored); Olivia Duvall (penalty scored); Jordyn Mariam (penalty scored) | | (penalty scored) Noelle Sather; (penalty missed) Sadie Sider-Echenberg; (penalty scored) Elyse Thornton; (penalty scored) Sophia Cabral; (penalty scored) Gaby Rourke; (penalty scored) Mia Rodach; (penalty missed) Selma Åström |

| November 6 | (1) Memphis | 3–3 (a.e.t.) (1–3 p) | (5) UTSA | Lakewood Ranch, FL |
| 7:30 p.m. EST | Ashley Henderson (yellow card) 28'; Alex Mackay 35'; Ally Casey 80'; Elise Perron 85' | Report | 32' Zoë May; (yellow card) 51' Izzy Lane; (yellow card) 66' Leah Varela; 86' Brooklyn Bailey; 88' Aaliyaiah Durden | Stadium: Premier Sports Campus; Attendance: 319; Referee: Shaye Lane; Assistant referees: Kevin Klinger; Carlos Morales-Lastra; Fourth official: Sebastian Ocampo |
| | Penalties |
| | Ashley Henderson (penalty missed); Ai Kitagawa (penalty scored); Finley Lavin (penalty missed); Ally Casey (penalty missed) | | (penalty scored) Jasmine Kessler; (penalty scored) Zoë May; (penalty scored) Bri Carrigan |

=== Final ===
| November 9 | (5) UTSA | 1–0 (a.e.t.) | (6) Rice | Lakewood Ranch, FL |
| :00 p.m. EST | Rylee Miller (yellow card) 63'; Team (yellow card) 84'; Bri Carrigan 99' | Report | | Stadium: Premier Sports Campus; Attendance: 459; Referee: Melinda Homa; Assistant referees: Jade Mallea; Sarieni Vasquez; Fourth official: Daniel Va |

== Statistics ==
=== Goalscorers ===
There were 15 goals scored in 7 matches, for an average of 2.14 goals per match (as of November 9, 2025).

2 goals

- Aaliyaiah Durden – UTSA

1 goal

- Ally Casey – Memphis
- Ashley Henderson – Memphis
- Alex Mackay – Memphis
- Elise Perron – Memphis
- Eileen Albers – Rice
- Sophia Cabral – South Florida
- Noelle Sather – South Florida
- Sadie Sider-Echenberg – South Florida
- Lailah Stewart – UAB
- Brooklyn Bailey – UTSA
- Bri Carrigan – UTSA
- Zoë May – UTSA
- Michelle Polo – UTSA

== All-Tournament team ==
| Player | Team |
|---|---|
| Ashley Henderson | Memphis |
| Eileen Albers | Rice |
| Jadyn Jaeger | Rice |
| Lily Reuscher | Rice |
| Dayo Tennyson | Rice |
| Sadie Sider-Echenberg | South Florida |
| Brooklyn Bailey | UTSA |
| Bri Carrigan* | UTSA |
| Aaliyaiah Durden | UTSA |
| Jasmine Kessler^ | UTSA |
| Zoë May | UTSA |

* Offensive MVP
^ Defensive MVP
