= Thelma Lóa Hermannsdóttir =

Icelandicfootballer (born 1999)

Personal information
- Date of birth: 14 November 1999 (age 26)
- Height: 1.73 m (5 ft 8 in)
- Positions: Midfielder; forward

Team information
- Current team: FH
- Number: 11

College career
Years	Team	Apps	(Gls)
2018–2022	Florida Atlantic Owls	88	(9)

Senior career*
Years	Team	Apps	(Gls)
2016–2020	Fylkir	–	(–)
2020–2021	KR	–	(–)
2024	FH	3	(0)
2024–2025	Fort Lauderdale United	8	(0)
2025–	FH	21	(11)

International career^{‡}
	Iceland U17	2	(0)
	Iceland U19	5	(0)
- * Club domestic league appearances and goals as of 01:13, 16 June 2026 (UTC) ‡ National team caps and goals as of 01:13, 16 June 2026 (UTC)

Thelma Lóa Hermannsdóttir (born 14 November 1999) is an Icelandic professional footballer who plays as a midfielder or forward for Besta deild kvenna club FH. She played college soccer in the United States for the Florida Atlantic Owls before joining USL Super League club Fort Lauderdale United FC for one season. She has also previously played domestically for Fylkir and KR.

== Early life ==
Thelma Lóa was raised in Reykjavík, where she attended primary school at Árbæjarskóli. Her parents are former Iceland national team captains Hermann Hreiðarsson and Ragna Lóa Stefánsdóttir, while her sister is fellow professional footballer Ída Marín Hermannsdóttir. At age 17, Thelma Lóa started playing professionally in 2016 with Fylkir of the Úrvalsdeild kvenna. She was an unused substitute in her first 3 games in the squad before debuting as a second-half substitute in a match against Þór/KA. She scored her first professional goal on 20 July 2016, against Selfoss. In 2018, her final year playing in Iceland full-time, she scored Fylkir's lone goal in a lopsided 9–1 Icelandic Women's Football Cup semifinal defeat to Stjarnan.

== College career ==
Thelma Lóa moved to the United States in 2018 to study abroad at Florida Atlantic University. She played five seasons of college soccer for the Florida Atlantic Owls, scoring recording 9 goals in 88 games played. In her freshman and sophomore years, she was a bench player, starting in 2 of her 18 appearances in 2018 and then starting in zero of her 21 appearances the following season.

Thelma Lóa was not able to play collegiately in 2020 due to the COVID-19 pandemic. Instead, she spent a short stint back in Iceland with KR, gaining playing time in the lead-up to the NCAA's return to action.

As a junior back at Florida Atlantic in the 2021 spring season, Thelma Lóa scored twice, first in the Owls' season-opener, and then in the team's regular-season finale. She also notched an assist in Florida Atlantic's Conference USA tournament opener against Southern Miss. In the fall of 2021, Thelma Lóa played in all 18 of the Owls' matches and posted a season-high 78 minutes against Charlotte in the CUSA tournament. Finally, as a fifth-year player in 2022 (athletes were offered an additional year of NCAA eligibility due to the COVID-19 pandemic), Thelma Lóa had her most successful season, scoring a career-high 6 goals and earning third-team All-CUSA honors. Three of her six goals came in a hat-trick against UTEP in October 2022. She also scored the equalizer in a comeback win over Charlotte in the CUSA tournament semifinals en route to a CUSA tournament runner-up finish.

== Club career ==
After graduating from college, Thelma Lóa joined FH. She participated in 3 games for the club in the 2024 Besta deild kvenna.

In October 2024, Thelma Lóa returned to Florida, signing a contract with Fort Lauderdale United FC partway through the first half of the inaugural USL Super League season. She made her Super League debut on 1 December 2024, coming on as a stoppage-time substitute in a 2–1 win over the Dallas Trinity. She went on to make play in 7 league matches for the club, as well as in the 2025 USL Super League final, in which Fort Lauderdale were defeated by Tampa Bay Sun FC. On 8 July 2025, Fort Lauderdale United announced that Thelma Lóa would be departing from the club after one season.

On July 17, 2025, Thelma Lóa was announced to have returned to FH, a move that reunited her with her sister, fellow FH player Ída Marín Hermannsdóttir. She scored her first goals for FH in August 2025, tallying a hat-trick in a 5–3 victory over Þór/KA that lifted FH to second place in the league standings. She continued to make her mark as a midseason acquisition, scoring 9 goals in her first 13 league games. Morgunblaðið selected Thelma Lóa as the newspaper's Besta deild kvenna October 2025 Player of the Month.

== International career ==
Thelma Lóa has represented Iceland internationally at the U17 and U19 levels, totaling 7 appearances across both age groups.
