= 2024 American Athletic Conference women's soccer tournament =

- Classification: Division I
- Teams: 8
- Matches: 7
- Attendance: 1,284
- Site: Premier Sports Campus; Lakewood Ranch, Florida
- Champions: East Carolina (1st title)
- Winning coach: Gary Higgins (1st title)
- MVP: Annabelle Abbott (Offensive); Maeve English (Defensive) (East Carolina)
- Broadcast: ESPN+ ESPNU (Final)

2024 American Athletic Conference women's soccer standings
	Conf.						Overall
Team	W		L		T	PCT	W		L		T	PCT
Memphis ‍†‍‍	6	–	0	–	4	.800	13	–	2	–	4	.789
South Florida ‍‍‍	6	–	1	–	3	.750	12	–	2	–	5	.763
East Carolina ‍‍‡‍^{y}	5	–	2	–	3	.650	10	–	4	–	7	.643
Rice ‍‍‍	5	–	4	–	1	.550	12	–	6	–	2	.650
UAB ‍‍‍	4	–	2	–	4	.600	7	–	5	–	5	.559
Charlotte ‍‍‍	3	–	2	–	5	.550	4	–	8	–	7	.395
North Texas ‍‍‍	3	–	3	–	4	.500	7	–	6	–	6	.526
Tulsa ‍‍‍	3	–	5	–	2	.400	7	–	9	–	4	.450
UTSA ‍‍‍	3	–	5	–	2	.400	8	–	7	–	3	.528
Florida Atlantic ‍‍‍	2	–	6	–	2	.300	3	–	11	–	4	.278
Temple ‍‍‍	0	–	10	–	0	.000	2	–	17	–	0	.105
† – Conference champion ‡ – 2024 AAC Tournament champion y – Invited to the NCAA Tournament; As of December 10, 2024; Rankings from United Soccer Coaches Poll; Source:American Athletic Conference

The 2024 American Athletic Conference women's soccer tournament was the postseason women's soccer tournament for the American Athletic Conference held from November 4to November 10, 2024. The tournament was hosted at the Premier Sports Campus located in Lakewood Ranch, Florida. The eight-team single-elimination tournament consisted of three rounds based on seeding from regular season conference play. The Memphis Tigers were the defending tournament champions. Memphis was unable to defend its title. They reached the Final but fell to East Carolina 1–0 in overtime. East Carolina's win was the program's first and also the first for third-year head coach Gary Higgins. As tournament champions, East Carolina earned the American's automatic berth into the 2024 NCAA Division I women's soccer tournament.

This was the last conference tournament to be held under the "American Athletic Conference" name. On July 21, 2025, the conference dropped the word "Athletic" from its name, becoming simply the American Conference.

== Seeding ==
The top eight teams in the regular season earned a spot in the tournament. Teams were seeded based on their regular season conference records. A tiebreaker was required to determine the fourth and fifth seeds as Rice and UAB both finished with sixteen points in conference play. Rice earned the fourth seed by virtue of their 2–1 win over UAB on September 26. A second tiebreaker was required to determine the eighth and final seed in the tournament as Tulsa and UTSA both finished with 3–5–2 regular season records. Tulsa earned the final spot in the tournament by virtue of their 2–1 win over UTSA on October 10. USTA finished ninth and did not participate in the tournament.

Seed	School	Conference Record	Points
1	Memphis	6–0–4	22
2	South Florida	6–1–3	21
3	East Carolina	5–2–3	18
4	Rice	5–4–1	16
5	UAB	4–2–4	16
6	Charlotte	3–2–5	14
7	North Texas	3–3–4	13
8	Tulsa	3–5–2	8

== Bracket ==
First Round; Monda, Nov. 4
1	Memphis	4
8	Tulsa	2
4	Rice	2
5	UAB	0
3	East Carolina (a.e.t.)	1
6	Charlotte	0
2	South Florida	1
7	North Texas	0

Semifinals; Thursday, Nov. 7
1	Memphis	3
4	Rice	1
3	East Carolina (pen.)	1 (5)
2	South Florida	1 (3)

Final; Sunday, Nov. 10
1	Memphis	0
3	East Carolina (a.e.t.)	1

== Schedule ==
=== First Round ===
November 4, 2024	#3 East Carolina	1–0 (a.e.t.)	#6 Charlotte	Lakewood Ranch, FL
11:00 a.m. EST	Caitlen-Star Dolan Boodram (yellow card) 87'; Erica Roberts 101'	Recap	(yellow card) 46' Charlotte Harris; (yellow card) 65' Braelynn Francher	Stadium: Premier Sports Campus; Attendance: 107; Referee: Melinda Homa; Assistant referees: Emily Gomez; Daniel Va

November 4, 2024	#2 South Florida	1–0	#7 North Texas	Lakewood Ranch, FL
2:00 p.m. EST	Anna Sutter 11'; Ava Rightmire (yellow card) 54'	Report	(yellow card) 90' Lily Cunningham	Stadium: Premier Sports Campus; Attendance: 129; Referee: Amber O'Connor; Assistant referees: Jade Mallea; Carlos Morales-Lastra

November 4, 2024	#4 Rice	2–0	#5 UAB	Lakewood Ranch, FL
5:30 p.m. EST	Lauren Pickup (yellow card) 25'; Sophie Zhang 71'; Jules Johnston 76'	Report	(yellow card) 90' Kendall Page	Stadium: Premier Sports Campus; Attendance: 157; Referee: Kaitlyn Trowbridge; Assistant referees: Ryan Lindskog; Ethan O'Hearn

November 4, 2024	#1 Memphis	4–2	#8 Tulsa	Lakewood Ranch, FL
8:15 p.m. EST	Anna Hauer 21'; Team (yellow card) 44'; Elise Perron 55'; Ashley Henderson 57'; Momo Nakao 65'	Report	35' Kaleigh Hart; 58' Leah Diaz; (yellow card) 82' Team	Stadium: Premier Sports Campus; Attendance: 149; Referee: Matthew Miscannon; Assistant referees: Preston Joyner; Alexandra Platt

=== Semifinals ===
November 7, 2024	#2 South Florida	1–1 (a.e.t.) (3–5 p)	#3 East Carolina	Lakewood Ranch, FL
4:00 p.m. EST	Anna Sutter 57'	Report	(yellow card) 64' Caitlen-Star Dolan Boodram; 84' Sydney Schnell	Stadium: Premier Sports Campus; Attendance: 187; Referee: Meghan Mullen; Assistant referees: Emily Gomez; Alexandra Platt
	Penalties
	Georgia Brown (penalty scored); Anna Sutter (penalty scored); Gentiana Fetaj (penalty missed); Brooke Fabri (penalty scored)		(penalty scored) Abby Sowa; (penalty scored) Caitlen-Star Dolan Boodram; (penalty scored) Emma Sheehan; (penalty scored) Isabella Gutiérrez; (penalty scored) Juliana Viera

November 7, 2024	#1 Memphis	3–1	#4 Rice	Lakewood Ranch, FL
7:30 p.m. EST	Ashley Henderson 17', 68'; Momo Nakao 77'	Report	57' Natalie Gorji; (yellow card) 88' Kat Lazor	Stadium: Premier Sports Campus; Attendance: 236; Referee: Jennifer Dumaine; Assistant referees: Jade Mallea; Ryan Lindskog

=== Final ===
November 10, 2024	#1 Memphis	0–1 (a.e.t.)	#3 East Carolina	Lakewood Ranch, FL
2:00 p.m. EST		Report	(yellow card) 64' Sydney Schnell; (yellow card) 100' Abby Sowa; (yellow card) 102' Team; 107' Annabelle Abbott	Stadium: Premier Sports Campus; Attendance: 319; Referee: Jaclyn Metz; Assistant referees: Jade Mallea; Preston Joyner

== Statistics ==
=== Goalscorers ===
There were 17 goals scored in 7 matches, for an average of 2.43 goals per match (as of November 10, 2024).

3 goals

- Ashley Henderson – Memphis

2 goals

- Anna Sutter – South Florida
- Momo Nakao – Memphis

1 goal

- Annabelle Abbott – East Carolina
- Leah Diaz – Tulsa
- Natalie Gorji – Rice
- Kaleigh Hart – Tulsa
- Anna Hauer – Memphis
- Jules Johnston – Rice
- Elise Perron – Memphis
- Erica Roberts – East Carolina
- Sydney Schnell – East Carolina
- Sophie Zhang – Rice

== All-Tournament team ==
Player	Team
Anabelle Abbott*	East Carolina
Maeve English^	East Carolina
Erica Roberts	East Carolina
Sydney Schnell	East Carolina
Abby Sowa	East Carolina
Anna Hauer	Memphis
Ashley Henderson	Memphis
Finley Lavin	Memphis
Momo Nakao	Memphis
Sophie Zhang	Rice
Anna Sutter	South Florida

* Offensive MVP
^ Defensive MVP
