= SMU Mustangs women's soccer =

American college soccer team

- 2025 SMU Mustangs women's soccer team
- Founded: 1981; 45 years ago
- University: Southern Methodist University
- Head coach: Nicole Nelson (4th season)
- Conference: ACC
- Location: Dallas, Texas, US
- Stadium: Westcott Field (capacity: 4,000)
- Nickname: SMU Mustangs
- Colors: Red and blue
| Home | Away |

NCAA tournament College Cup
- 1995

NCAA tournament Quarterfinals
- 1995

NCAA tournament Round of 16
- 1995, 1999

NCAA tournament appearances
- 1990, 1992, 1993, 1995, 1997, 1999, 2001, 2002, 2003, 2004, 2005, 2006, 2016

Conference tournament championships
- 1995, 1997, 1999, 2001, 2002, 2003, 2004, 2016

Conference regular season championships
- 1995, 1996, 1997, 1998, 2000, 2001, 2002, 2003, 2004, 2005, 2006

The SMU Mustangs women's soccer program represents Southern Methodist University in National Collegiate Athletic Association (NCAA) Division I. The Mustangs compete in the Atlantic Coast Conference (ACC) and play their home games on SMU's campus in Dallas, Texas at Westcott Field.

== History ==
The SMU women's soccer program played their first season in 1986 under the direction of head coach Alan Kirkup. The Mustangs made their first NCAA Tournament appearance in 1990.

The Southwest Conference sponsored women's soccer in 1995, and in that season the Mustangs advanced to the NCAA Final Four after winning both the SWC regular season and tournament championships.

SMU joined the Western Athletic Conference in 1996, and Greg Ryan took over the program. The Mustangs returned to the NCAA Tournament in 1997, and won the regular season conference title in all three of Ryan's seasons at SMU.

George Van Linder was named head coach in 1999, and SMU continued their success with three NCAA Tournament appearances and three regular season conference championships in Van Linder's four seasons.

John Cossaboon took control as head coach in 2003, and SMU returned to the NCAA Tournament again in both 2003 and 2004. The Mustangs also won both the WAC regular season and tournament championships in their final two seasons in the WAC.

In the nine seasons SMU competed in the WAC, the Mustangs advanced to the NCAA Tournament six times. The Mustangs also won the conference regular season championship eight times and the conference postseason tournament championship six times.

SMU joined Conference USA in 2005, and the Mustangs continued their success with two more appearances in the NCAA Tournament as well as two more regular season conference championships under the direction of Cossaboon.

Two-time National Coach Of The Year Chris Petrucelli was named head coach of SMU in 2012. The Mustangs joined The American Athletic Conference in 2013.

== Current roster ==
As of January 10, 2026

Note: Flags indicate national team as defined under FIFA eligibility rules; some limited exceptions apply. Players may hold more than one non-FIFA nationality.

| No. | Pos. | Nation | Player |
|---|---|---|---|
| 1 | GK | USA | Aubrey Brown |
| 2 | MF | USA | Kaya Lee |
| 3 | MF | JPN | Mayu Inokawa |
| 4 | DF | USA | Hali Hartman |
| 5 | FW | USA | Truth Byars |
| 6 | DF | USA | Sammy Nieves |
| 7 | DF | USA | Sydney Japic |
| 8 | MF | USA | Sarah Bonnecaze |
| 9 | FW | USA | Julianna Millin |
| 10 | MF | USA | Lindsay Nicholson |
| 11 | MF | USA | Zoe Parkhurst |
| 12 | DF | USA | Paxton Bock |
| 13 | MF | USA | Brooke Bunton |

| No. | Pos. | Nation | Player |
|---|---|---|---|
| 14 | FW | USA | Liz Eddy |
| 15 | MF | USA | Lydia Ungashick |
| 16 | MF | USA | Kelly Gordon |
| 19 | FW | CAN | Nyah Rose |
| 21 | DF | CAN | Savannah Chenail |
| 22 | MF | USA | Nicole Stryker |
| 25 | DF | USA | Claire Jones |
| 29 | MF | USA | Libby Jannereth |
| 30 | GK | USA | Jessi Curry |
| 31 | DF | USA | Paige Boeger |
| 32 | MF | USA | Maura Yumul |
| 34 | FW | USA | Jen Jackson |
| 66 | GK | USA | Haven Empey-Taylor |

== Stadium ==
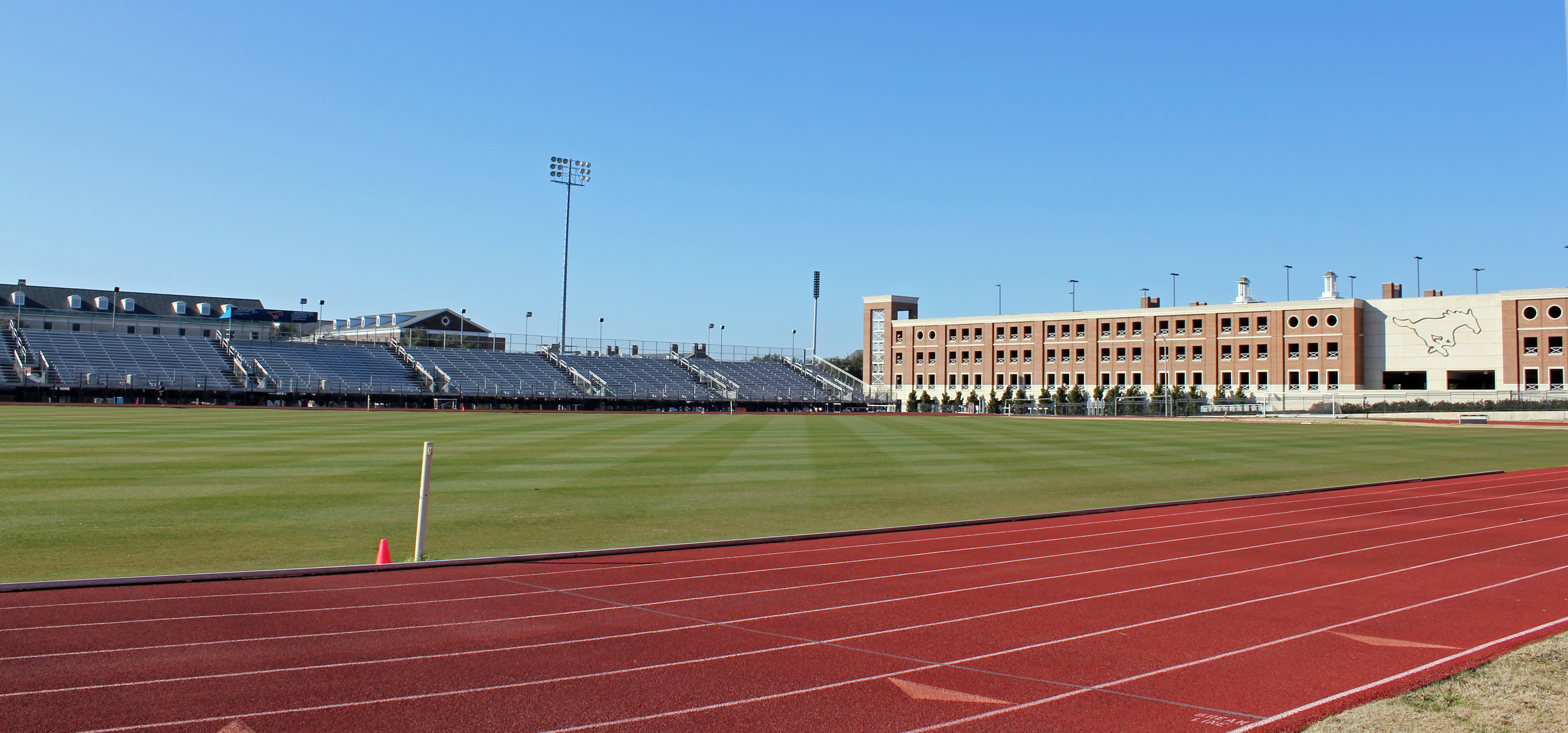
Westcott Field, home of the Mustangs

The Mustangs play their home games at Washburne Soccer and Track Stadium (previously, "Westcott Field") on the campus of SMU. The soccer field is natural grass and measures 115 yards (105 m) x 75 yards (69 m).

In 2022, the stadium was extensively renovated to include locker rooms, training facilities and new grandstands.

== Coaches ==
| Tenure | Coach | Seasons | Record | Pct. |
|---|---|---|---|---|
| 1986–1995 | Alan Kirkup | 10 | 149–52–7 | .733 |
| 1996–1998 | Greg Ryan | 3 | 37–21–5 | .627 |
| 1999–2002 | George Van Linder | 4 | 59–20–7 | .727 |
| 2003–2006 | John Cossaboon | 4 | 64–17–8 | .764 |
| 2007–2011 | Brent Erwin | 5 | 44–46–8 | .490 |
| 2012–2022 | Chris Petrucelli | 10 | 88–74–19 | .539 |
| 2022–present | Nicole Nelson | 4 | 35–27–10 | .556 |
| Totals | 8 coaches | 39 seasons | 476–292–64 | .611 |
Records are through the conclusion of the 2025 season.

== Seasons ==
| Season | Coach | Record | | Notes |
|---|---|---|---|---|
| Season | Coach | Overall | Conference | Notes |
Independent
| 1986 | Alan Kirkup | 15–3–2 | — | |
| 1987 | Alan Kirkup | 18–3–1 | — | |
| 1988 | Alan Kirkup | 17–5–0 | — | |
| 1989 | Alan Kirkup | 14–4–0 | — | |
| 1990 | Alan Kirkup | 14–6–1 | — | NCAA First Round |
| 1991 | Alan Kirkup | 10–8–0 | — | |
| 1992 | Alan Kirkup | 15–6–0 | — | NCAA First Round |
| 1993 | Alan Kirkup | 13–7–1 | — | NCAA First Round |
| 1994 | Alan Kirkup | 10–9–1 | — | |
Southwest Conference
| 1995 | Alan Kirkup | 23–1–1 | 5–0–0 | SWC Regular Season and Tournament Champions; NCAA Semifinals (Final Four) |
Western Athletic Conference
| 1996 | Greg Ryan | 11–6–4 | 5–0–1 | WAC Regular Season Champions |
| 1997 | Greg Ryan | 17–5–1 | 6–0–1 | WAC Regular Season and Tournament Champions; NCAA Second Round |
| 1998 | Greg Ryan | 9–10–0 | 5–1–0 | WAC Regular Season Champions |
| 1999 | George Van Linder | 17–6–1 | 5–2–0 | WAC Tournament Champions; NCAA Third Round |
| 2000 | George Van Linder | 13–5–1 | 6–0–1 | WAC Regular Season Champions |
| 2001 | George Van Linder | 16–4–0 | 8–0–0 | WAC Regular Season and Tournament Champions; NCAA Second Round |
| 2002 | George Van Linder | 13–5–5 | 5–1–1 | WAC Regular Season and Tournament Champions; NCAA Second Round |
| 2003 | John Cossaboon | 17–3–2 | 7–1–0 | WAC Regular Season and Tournament Champions; NCAA First Round |
| 2004 | John Cossaboon | 15–4–3 | 5–1–1 | WAC Regular Season and Tournament Champions; NCAA First Round |
Conference USA
| 2005 | John Cossaboon | 15–5–2 | 8–1–0 | C-USA Regular Season Champions; NCAA Second Round |
| 2006 | John Cossaboon | 17–5–1 | 8–1–0 | C-USA Regular Season Champions; NCAA Second Round |
| 2007 | Brent Erwin | 9–7–1 | 4–5–0 | |
| 2008 | Brent Erwin | 6–13–1 | 4–7–0 | |
| 2009 | Brent Erwin | 7–11–1 | 5–5–1 | |
| 2010 | Brent Erwin | 11–7–4 | 6–4–1 | |
| 2011 | Brent Erwin | 11–8–1 | 7–3–1 | |
| 2012 | Chris Petrucelli | 9–8–4 | 4–3–4 | |
American Athletic Conference
| 2013 | Chris Petrucelli | 9–9–1 | 3–5–1 | |
| 2014 | Chris Petrucelli | 7–14–0 | 2–7–0 | |
| 2015 | Chris Petrucelli | 5–10–3 | 2–6–1 | |
| 2016 | Chris Petrucelli | 13–7–2 | 6–2–1 | NCAA First Round |
| 2017 | Chris Petrucelli | 10–7–3 | 4–4–1 | |
| 2018 | Chris Petrucelli | 10–6–2 | 5–4–0 | |
| 2019 | Chris Petrucelli | 12–7–1 | 4–5–0 | |
| 2020 | Chris Petrucelli | 1–1–0 | 1–1–0 | |
| 2021 | Chris Petrucelli | 12–5–2 | 4–2–2 | NCAA Second Round |
| 2022 | Nicole Nelson | 10–4–5 | 3–3–2 | |
| 2023 | Nicole Nelson | 11–6–1 | 5–3–1 | |
Atlantic Coast Conference
| 2024 | Nicole Nelson | 6–9–2 | 2–6–2 | |
| 2025 | Nicole Nelson | 8–8–2 | 2–6–2 | |
| Totals | | 476–292–64 | 146–92–25 | 832 games (.611) |
Records are through the conclusion of the 2025 season.

== Notable alumni ==
=== Current professionals ===
As of January 10, 2026

- (United States) Allie Thornton (2016–2019) – Currently with Dallas Trinity FC
- (United States) Samantha Estrada (2018–2023) – Currently with Dallas Trinity FC
- (Mexico) Julissa Cisneros (2022) – Currently with Kaya–Iloilo
- Sierra Cota-Yarde (2024) – Currently with AFC Toronto and Portugal international
