= Louisiana Tech Lady Techsters soccer =

American college soccer team

- Founded: 2004
- University: Louisiana Tech University
- Head coach: Steve Voltz (2nd season)
- Conference: Sun Belt
- Location: Ruston, Louisiana, US
- Stadium: Robert Mack Caruthers Field (capacity: 500)
- Nickname: Lady Techsters
- Colors: Red and blue
Home	Away

The Louisiana Tech Lady Techsters soccer team represents Louisiana Tech University in NCAA Division I college soccer. The team belongs to Sun Belt Conference and plays its home games at Robert Mack Caruthers Field. The Lady Techsters are currently led by Steve Voltz, who has been the head coach since 2021.

== History ==
On May 2, 2004, Jennifer Soileau was named the first head coach of the Lady Techsters soccer team. In their first season, the Lady Techsters went 0–10–2. Soileau went on to coach the Techsters for the 2005 and 2006 seasons, compiling a 11–30–5 overall record as the Lady Techsters head coach.

In 2007, Kevin Sherry was named head soccer coach at Louisiana Tech. During his tenure, the Lady Techsters have compiled a record of 107–75–21.

In 2008, the National Collegiate Athletic Association (NCAA) named the Louisiana Tech women's soccer team the most improved team in the nation across all NCAA sports.

The Lady Techsters are 118–105–26 all-time and 20–18–22 in Conference USA play.

== Facilities ==
During the program's inaugural season in 2004, the team played all of their home games on the intramural soccer field across from the Lambright Intramural Center.

The Lady Techsters played in Joe Aillet Stadium, home to Louisiana Tech Bulldogs football team, for the 2005, 2006 and 2007 seasons.

In 2008, the Lady Techster Soccer Complex opened as the new home to the Lady Techster Soccer team. The complex played host to the 2010 Western Athletic Conference women's soccer tournament. The Lady Techsters all-time record at the Complex is 67–20–7.

On April 25, 2019, a powerful tornado came through Louisiana Tech's Campus destroying many athletics facilities, including the Lady Techsters Soccer Complex. In October 2019, the university announced that two alumni had donated $250,000 in honor of former Petroleum Engineering professor Dr. Robert Caruthers to assist in rebuilding the Lady Techster soccer complex. Caruthers was a long-time engineering professor at Tech, leading the university's program in Petroleum Engineering and Geosciences. After serving Tech students for nearly 30 years, from 1967 to 1995, he died October 3, 2016. Demolition of the damaged Lady Techsters Soccer Complex began in September 2019.

On November 21, 2019, the university announced plans to build new, integrated softball and women's soccer facilities to replaced fields and infrastructure destroyed by the April 2019 tornado. The new soccer facilities are expected to be completed before the Lady Techster's Fall 2020 season begins.

== Seasons ==
Season	Coach	Regular season		Postseason	
Season	Coach	Overall	Conference	Conference Tournament	NCAA Tournament
Independent (2004)
2004	Jennifer Soileau	0–10–2	N/A	–	–
Western Athletic Conference (2005–2012)
2005	Jennifer Soileau	7–10–0	0–7–0	–	–
2006	Jennifer Soileau	4–10–3	0–6–1	–	–
2007	Kevin Sherry	2–14–1	0–6–1	–	–
2008	Kevin Sherry	10–5–5	0–3–4	–	–
2009	Kevin Sherry	12–7–1	1–7–0	–	–
2010	Kevin Sherry	15–6–0	5–3–0	Quarterfinals	–
2011	Kevin Sherry	8–8–4	1–6–0	–	–
2012	Kevin Sherry	12–5–4	3–3–2	Quarterfinals	–
Conference USA (2013–Present)
2013	Kevin Sherry	9–10–1	4–6	–	–
2014	Kevin Sherry	13–6–3	5–4	Semifinals	–
2015	Kevin Sherry	12–8–1	5–4	Quarterfinals	–
2016	Kevin Sherry	14–6–1	6–4	Quarterfinals	–
2017	Kevin Sherry	14–3–5	6–1	Semifinals	–
2018	Kevin Sherry	13–5–3	5–3–2	Semifinals	–
2019	Kevin Sherry	13–4–3	5–4–1	Quarterfinals	–
2020–21	Kevin Sherry	9–7–0	1–5–0	–	–
2021	Steve Voltz	6–8–3	2–4–2	–	–
2022	Steve Voltz	7–9–3	5–3–2	Quarterfinals	–
Total:		158–117–37	46–73–11		

== Attendance ==
Season	Overall W-L	Home Games	Average Attendance	Total Attendance
Attendance statistics only available from the 2009 season onward.
2009	12–7–1	12	197	2,361
2010	15–6–0	12	279	3,344
2011	8–8–4	7	227	2078
2012	12–5–4	9	236	2,125
2013	9–10–1	7	249	1,740
2014	13–6–3	10	230	2,297
2015	12–8–1	8	253	2,023
2016	14–6–1	10	216	2,164
2017	14–3–5	9	214	1,923
2018	13–5–3	10	162	1,621
2019*	13–4–3	6	106	637
*Home complex was destroyed by a tornado and team played home games at local municipal and high school stadiums.

== Awards ==
=== Team awards ===
Most improved NCAA team
Coach	Season
Kevin Sherry	2007

=== Individual awards ===
Academic All-America of the Year
Pos	Player	Team	Year
F	Kathryn Sloan	3rd Team – CoSIDA	2015
F	Kathryn Sloan	1st Team – CoSIDA	2016

== Notable players ==
Pos	Player	National Team	Club Team
D	Nomvula Kgoale	South Africa	--
D	Donya Salomon-Ali	Haiti	--
