= UTSA Roadrunners women's soccer =

American college soccer team

- University: University of Texas at San Antonio
- Head coach: Derek Pittman
- Location: San Antonio, Texas, US
- Stadium: Park West Athletics Complex (capacity: 1,000)
- Nickname: Roadrunners
- Colors: Navy blue, orange, and white
Home	Away

NCAA tournament appearances
- 2010, 2022, 2025

Conference tournament championships
- 2010, 2022, 2025

The UTSA Roadrunners women's soccer team represents University of Texas at San Antonio in NCAA Division I college soccer. UTSA competes in the American Conference and play their home matches at Park West Athletics Complex in San Antonio, Texas. The Roadrunners are led by head coach Derek Pittman.

== History ==
In 2010, UTSA was Southland Conference tournament champions, therefore they earned their place at the 2010 NCAA tournament, where the squad suffered a hard defeat (0–9) v Portland in the first round.

After an agreement with the City of San Antonio and Bexar County, the University inaugurated a stadium, Park West Athletics Complex, in 2013. The venue has served as home venue to the UTSA soccer teams (apart from the track and field teams) since then. As part of the agreement, PWAC is also available for events organised by the city and county.

In 2022, the Roadrunners won the Conference USA tournament in their last year in the conference. The Roadrunners defeated Florida Atlantic in the final. In the 2022 NCAA tournament they lost to TCU (1–3) in the first round.

In July 2023, UTSA moved to the American Conference.

In 2025, the Roadrunners won the program's first American conference tournament title and third conference title overall in program history, defeating Rice 1-0 in extra time.

== Current squad ==
As of November 2026

Note: Flags indicate national team as defined under FIFA eligibility rules; some limited exceptions apply. Players may hold more than one non-FIFA nationality.

No.	Pos.	Nation	Player
0	GK	USA	Kylie Kissee
00	GK	USA	Jasmine Kessler
1	GK	USA	Jaelyn Bracamonte
2	DF	USA	Kameron Kloza
3	MF	USA	Bri Carrigan
4	MF	USA	Leah Varela
5	DF	USA	Taliyah Spain
6	DF	PUR	Jazira Gonzalez
7	FW	CAN	Ava Jackson
8	DF	USA	Sam Garofalo
9	FW	ENG	Dulci Binns
10	MF	USA	Amelia Clark
11	MF	USA	Addi O'Kelley
12	FW	USA	Claire Garritson
13	MF	USA	Valeria Sanchez

No.	Pos.	Nation	Player
14	MF	USA	Emma Kate Schroll
15	DF	USA	Isabel Peters
16	DF	USA	Kacey Grahmann
17	FW	USA	Sadie Paul
18	DF	USA	Lilli Denhardt
19	DF	USA	Sofia Peters
20	MF	USA	Sabrina Taber
21	MF	USA	Caroline Pelkofski
22	MF	USA	Olivia Christodoulides
23	FW	USA	Brooklyn Bailey
24	DF	USA	Aaliyaiah Durden
25	MF	USA	Olivia D'Ambrosia
27	MF	USA	Adelina Torres-Rava
98	FW	USA	Shea Ryan
