= North Texas Mean Green =

Intercollegiate athletics program of the University of North Texas

- University: University of North Texas
- Nickname: Mean Green
- NCAA: Division I (FBS)
- Conference: American Conference
- Athletic director: Jared Mosley
- Location: Denton, Texas
- Varsity teams: 16
- Football stadium: DATCU Stadium
- Basketball arena: UNT Coliseum (aka The Super Pit)
- Colors: Green and white
- Mascot: Scrappy
- Website: meangreensports.com

North Texas Mean Green (formerly North Texas Eagles) represents the University of North Texas (UNT) in intercollegiate athletics. The teams compete in Division I of the National Collegiate Athletic Association (NCAA). North Texas competed in the Sun Belt Conference and Conference USA before joining the American Athletic Conference, now known as the American Conference, on July 1, 2023. UNT's official school colors are Green and White. North Texas' mascot is an Eagle named Scrappy.

== Nickname ==
The name "Mean Green" was adopted by fans and media in 1966 for a North Texas football defensive squad that finished the season second in the nation against the rush. That school year, Joe Greene, then a sophomore at North Texas, played left defensive tackle on the football team and competed in track and field (shot put). There are conflicting accounts for the origin of the nickname. Two possible origins are two separate cheers that supposedly developed during North Texas' 1966 game against UTEP. One cheer was by Sidney Sue Graham, wife of the North Texas sports information director. In response to a tackle by Greene, she blurted out, "That’s the way, Mean Greene!" However, Bill Mercer, former North Texas play-by-play announcer, states Graham's thought behind the nickname was the Mean Green defense. Her husband began including the nickname for the team in press releases and it caught on with the media. Meanwhile, in the student section, North Texas basketball players Willie Davis and Ira Daniels, unsatisfied with the unenthusiastic crowd, began to chant "Mean Green, you look so good to me." The rest of the crowd soon followed. "After that we did it every game," Davis says. "A lot of people later on started associating it with Joe because his last name was Greene, but it actually started with that simple chant that Saturday night at Fouts Field. And that's the truth." By 1968, "Mean Green" was on the back of shirts, buttons, bumper stickers, and the cover of the North Texas football brochure. Even the band became identified as the "Mean Green Marching Machine."

== Conference affiliations ==
NCAA

American logo in North Texas' colors

- Lone Star Conference (1931–1949)
- Gulf Coast Conference (1949–1957)
- Missouri Valley Conference (1957–1975)
- Southland Conference (1982–1996)
- Big West Conference (1996–2000)
- Sun Belt Conference (2000–2013)
- Conference USA (2013–2023)
- American Conference (2023–present)

== Sports sponsored ==
| Men's sports | Women's sports |
|---|---|
| Basketball | Basketball |
| Cross country | Cross country |
| Football | Golf |
| Golf | Soccer |
| Track and field^{†} | Softball |
| | Swimming and diving |
| | Tennis |
| | Track and field^{†} |
| | Volleyball |
† – Track and field includes both indoor and outdoor

A member of the American Conference, North Texas sponsors teams in six men's and ten women's NCAA sanctioned sports.

=== Football ===
Founded in 1913, the Mean Green has won eight Lone Star Conference championships, five Gulf Coast Conference championships, five Missouri Valley Conference championships, two Southland Conference championships and most recently, four consecutive Sun Belt Conference championships. The team has also appeared in fifteen bowl games, winning three, most recently the 2025 New Mexico Bowl. From 1952 until the 2010 season, home football games were played at Fouts Field. A new 30,850-seat stadium, DATCU Stadium opened for the 2011 season.

=== Basketball ===
Since 1973, the school's teams for men's and women's basketball have played their home games in the Super Pit. For most of its history, the Mean Green have had patches of success, starting in the 1970s when the team received its first ever top-20 ranking under head coach Bill Blakeley. Blakeley coached three consecutive 20-win seasons: 1975–76 (22–4); 1976–77 (21–6); 1977–78 (22–6) From 2001 to 2012, the men's team experienced relative success under head coach Johnny Jones. During the 2006–2007 season, North Texas won its first Sun Belt Conference title and advanced to the NCAA Tournament for the first time since 1988. North Texas won the Sun Belt Conference title again during the 2009–2010 season to advance to the NCAA Tournament for the second time in four years. Jones left the team for his alma mater LSU in 2012, and his replacement Tony Benford has struggled to maintain Jones' success in Denton. In 2013, North Texas joined Conference USA, and from there moved to what is now the American Conference in 2023.

=== Men's golf ===
The men's golf team has won four NCAA Championships in 1949, 1950, 1951, and 1952.

== Discontinued sports ==
=== Baseball ===
In 1984, the university began fielding a varsity baseball team, but it was discontinued after the 1988 season because of the newly-enacted Title IX requiring institutions to provide athletic opportunities proportionate to the gender makeup of their student bodies. The team competed as a member of the Southland Conference. After starting the program's inaugural season with a 0–19 record, the Eagles won their first game against the Emporia State Hornets, 4–1. The team played their home games at Mack Park in Denton.

In the mid-2000s, the university planned to revive the program and build an on-campus ballpark. The ballpark would have been the home field for both the Mean Green and the Denton Outlaws collegiate summer baseball team. The program's revival failed to happen, and the Denton Outlaws disbanded after the 2007 season.

The 2014 UNT fiscal budget included $600,000 in start-up costs for reviving the Mean Green baseball program, with plans to construct a new on-campus ballpark within the Mean Green Village athletic complex. However, accounting errors by the UNT system led to the revival of the baseball program being placed on hold indefinitely. The earliest date the program could have been revived was in time for the 2016 season, dependent on the facilities' construction beginning in early 2015, but that did not occur.

==== Season-by-season results ====
| Season | Coach | Overall | Conference | Standing | Postseason |
|---|---|---|---|---|---|
Southland Conference (1984–1988)
| 1984 | Phil Price | 6–48 | 2–15 | 7th | |
| 1985 | Phil Price | 14–53 | 3–15 | 7th | |
| 1986 | Phil Price | 8–47 | 2–13 | 7th | |
| 1987 | Phil Price | 12–48 | 9–4 | 3rd (West) | |
| 1988 | Phil Price | 14–38 | 8–13 | 8th | |
| Phil Price: | | 54–234 | 17–70 | Source: | |
| Total: | | 54–234 | | | |
National champion Postseason invitational champion Conference regular season champion Conference regular season and conference tournament champion Division regular season champion Division regular season and conference tournament champion Conference tournament champion

== School spirit ==
The school's colors are Green and White. The music for the alma mater, "Glory to the Green and White", (originally titled "Our College") was composed by Julia Smith in 1919 and adopted by the school in 1922. The lyrics were written by Charles Langford, then a third-year letterman on the football team. The school's fight song, Fight, North Texas, composed by Francis Stroup, was adopted in 1939. The school mascot is a green and white eagle named Scrappy. The 400-member Green Brigade Marching Band performs at every home game, both pregame and halftime, for the crowd.

== Facilities ==
Many of the school's athletic facilities are located at the Mean Green Village, which opened for the 2006–07 athletic season. The athletic village area includes:

- DATCU Stadium (Football)
- The Super Pit (Men's, women's basketball)
- Norma Knobel Hunt Stadium (Women's Soccer, Track & Field)
- Waranch Tennis Complex (Women's Tennis)
- Lovelace Stadium (Softball)
- North Texas Volleyball Center (Volleyball)

== Alumni ==
Golf
The era of collegiate prominence in Texas golf began with North Texas winning four consecutive NCAA Division I Championships from 1949 to 1952. Intercollegiate golf had until then been dominated by the Ivy League, which—since 1897 when intercollegiate golf began—had won 36 national titles.

North Texas students Don January, who later won the PGA Championship, the 1951 U.S. Amateur champion Billy Maxwell, and Joe Conrad who was the winner of the 1955 British Amateur Championship, the 1953 Trans-Mississippi Amateur winner, was the 1953 and 1954 Southern Amateur winner, was the 1951 Texas Amateur winner, was the 1950 Mexican Amateur winner, was a member of the 1955 Walker Cup U.S. team, was a member of the victorious Americas Cup (golf) team in 1954 and 1956, and is a member of the Texas Golf Hall Of Fame, were all members of the North Texas golf team when they won the NCAA Division I Men's Golf Championships. Fred Cobb (1899–1954), the coach, launched the team in 1945. seventy-four years since winning its fourth consecutive Championship, only one other team in the nation—the Houston Cougars—has surpassed four consecutive titles. In the 129-year history of intercollegiate golf, North Texas is one of only nine with more than one national title.

Football
On September 1, 1956, Abner Haynes and his high school classmate Leon A. King (born 1938), became the first African American students to participate on the North Texas football team. In the larger picture, Haynes and King were the first to break the color barrier for intercollegiate sports in Texas—seven years before anyone was authorized to break it at a Southwest Conference school. Haynes quickly became an offensive and defensive star on the team. Despite his athletic leadership and fan popularity, Haynes experienced painful encounters with Jim Crow—including not being allowed to live on campus. Perhaps the worst was when Ole Miss, Mississippi State, and Chattanooga discontinued scheduling North Texas after 1956, citing state laws. Haynes went on to play with the Dallas Texans (1960–1963), earning the American Football League MVP in 1961, and continued playing when the team became the Kansas City Chiefs (1963–1964). Then he played for the Denver Broncos (1965–1966), the Miami Dolphins (1967), and the New York Jets. Haynes is in the Halls of Fame of North Texas (1986), Kansas City Chiefs (1991), and Texas Sports (2007). Haynes, who now lives in Denton, is one of a few athletes who was able to play high school, college, and professional football in North Texas.

Mean Joe Greene, in 1968, was selected as a College Football Consensus All American, the only alumnus in the 113-year history of football at North Texas to win the honor. He went on to the Pittsburgh Steelers where he anchored the Steel Curtain defense that led Pittsburgh to four Super Bowl titles. In 1976, North Texas inducted Greene as a Distinguished Alumnus, an honor bestowed only to twenty-nine others during the then ten-year history of the award. On August 1, 1983, Governor Mark White appointed Greene to the Board of Regents of North Texas, making him the first African American to serve as a regent of any Texas state university. In 1987, Greene was inducted into the Pro Football Hall of Fame, the only alumnus ever to become a member. In 1988, he was named to the North Texas Hall of Fame.

== Championship history ==
=== National titles ===
==== Golf ====
- NCAA Division I men's golf: 1949, 1950, 1951, 1952

==== Men's basketball ====
- College Basketball Invitational: 2018
- National Invitation Tournament: 2023

=== Conference titles ===
==== Football ====
- Lone Star Conference: 1932, 1935*, 1936, 1939, 1940, 1941, 1946, 1947
- Gulf Coast Conference: 1950, 1951, 1952, 1955
- Sun Belt Conference: 2001, 2002, 2003, 2004
- Conference USA West Division: 2017

==== Men's basketball ====
- Southland Tournament: 1988
- Sun Belt Tournament: 2007, 2010
- Sun Belt West Division: 2009, 2010
- Conference USA: 2020
- Conference USA Tournament: 2021
- Conference USA West Division: 2022

==== Women's basketball ====
- Southland Conference: 1986
- Big West Conference: 1999, 2000
- Sun Belt Conference: 2002
- American Athletic Conference: 2024

==== Women's soccer ====
- Sun Belt: 2001, 2004, 2005, 2011, 2012
- Sun Belt Tournament: 2004, 2005, 2012
- Conference USA: 2014, 2015, 2016, 2017, 2018
- Conference USA Tournament: 2015, 2018, 2019

Men's outdoor track and field (18)

Texas Intercollegiate Athletic Association
- 1923
Lone Star Conference
- 1932, 1933, 1935, 1936, 1937, 1938, 1940, 1941, 1943, 1946, 1949
Missouri Valley Conference
- 1967, 1970, 1973, 1974
Sun Belt Conference
- 2000, 2002

Men's cross country (10)
Lone Star Conference
- 1932, 1934
Southland Conference
- 1986, 1987, 1988, 1990, 1991, 1994
Sun Belt Conference
- 2000
Conference USA
- 2014, 2018

Men's golf (30)
Lone Star Conference
- 1941, 1942, 1943, 1946, 1947, 1948, 1949
Gulf Coast Conference
- 1950, 1956
Missouri Valley Conference
- 1961, 1962, 1963, 1964, 1965, 1966, 1968, 1969, 1970, 1971, 1972, 1974, 1975
Southland Conference
- 1984, 1993, 1996
Big West Conference
- 1999
Sun Belt Conference
- 2003, 2012, 2013
Conference USA
- 2015

Women's indoor track and field (2)

Sun Belt Conference
- 2005
American Conference
- 2026
Women's outdoor track and field (3)
Sun Belt Conference
- 2003, 2012, 2013

Women's cross country (1)
Southland Conference
- 1989

Women's tennis (4)
Southland Conference
- 1990
Sun Belt Conference
- 2010, 2012, 2013

Women's golf (3)
Conference USA
- 2021, 2022, 2023

Volleyball (1)
Southland Conference
- 1995

Sun Belt Conference West Division
- 2010*, 2012

Conference USA
- 2017

Softball (3)
Conference USA
- 2019*, 2021,
Conference USA Tournament
- 2022

=== Football postseason ===
- Optimist Bowl: 1946
- Salad Bowl: 1948
- Sun Bowl: 1959
- New Orleans Bowl: 2001, 2002, 2003, 2004, 2017
- Heart of Dallas Bowl: 2014, 2016
- New Mexico Bowl: 2018, 2025
- Myrtle Beach Bowl: 2020
- Frisco Football Classic: 2021
- Frisco Bowl: 2022
- First Responder Bowl: 2024
