= Rice Owls =

Athletics teams of Rice University

- University: Rice University
- Nickname: Owls
- NCAA: Division I (FBS)
- Conference: American
- Athletic director: Tommy McClelland
- Location: Houston, Texas
- Varsity teams: 16 (17 in 2026)
- Football stadium: First Community Stadium
- Basketball arena: Tudor Fieldhouse
- Baseball stadium: Reckling Park
- Colors: Blue and gray
- Mascot: Sammy the Owl
- Fight song: Rice Fight
- Website: riceowls.com
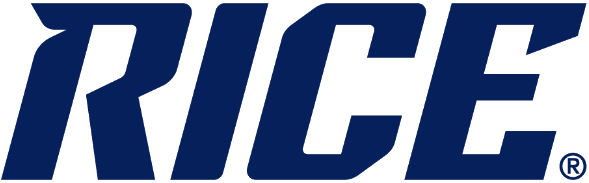

The Rice Owls are the sports teams representing Houston's Rice University in college sports. The name comes from the owls in Rice's crest. Rice participates in NCAA Division I athletics. A member of the American Conference, Rice sponsors teams in eight men's and eight women's NCAA-sanctioned sports. Rice was a member of the Southwest Conference until its breakup in 1996. Rice then joined the Western Athletic Conference and Conference USA, until joining the then-American Athletic Conference on July 1, 2023. The women's swimming team moved to the American in 2022 after CUSA dropped women's swimming & diving. Rice is the fifth-smallest school competing in NCAA Division I FBS football measured by undergraduate enrollment, just above the University of Tulsa's 2,756 and the three FBS United States service academies's approximate 4,500. Rice's rivals include the crosstown Houston Cougars.

== Conference affiliations ==
NCAA

- Southwest Conference (1915–1996)
- Western Athletic Conference (1996–2005)
- Conference USA (2005–2023)
- American Conference (2023–present)

== Sports sponsored ==
Men's sports	Women's sports
Baseball	Basketball
Basketball	Cross country
Cross country	Golf (in 2026–27)
Football	Soccer
Golf	Swimming & diving (Note: Rice's aquatics program fielded only swimmers from 1991 to 2024. Diving was reinstated in 2024–25.)
Tennis	Tennis
Track and field^{†}	Track and field^{†}
	Volleyball
† – Track and field includes both indoor and outdoor

American logo in Rice's colors

=== Baseball ===
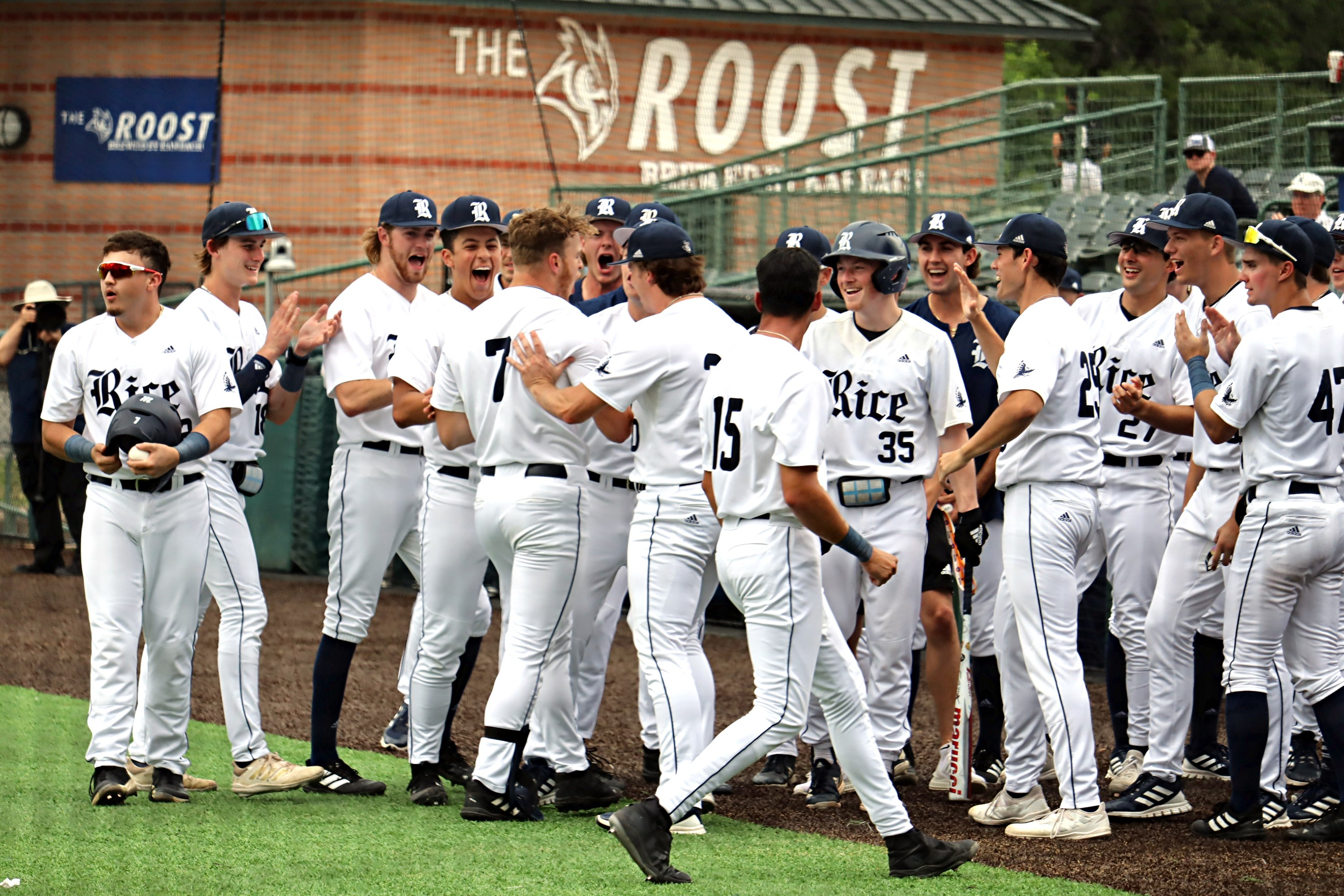
Owls baseball players celebrate a home run during a 2023 game at Reckling Park.

The Rice baseball team is the school's top athletic program and one of the NCAA's top baseball programs, having won 20 straight conference championships dating back to 1996. The Owls won the College World Series in 2003 and finished third in both the 2006 and 2007 College World Series tournaments. Rice made 23 straight NCAA tournament appearances from 1995 through 2017. The team has played at on-campus Reckling Park since the 2000 season.

=== Football ===
The Owls play at an on-campus football facility, First Community Stadium, which was the site of Super Bowl VIII and a speech by John F. Kennedy on September 12, 1962 in which he challenged the nation to send a man to the moon by the end of the decade. First Community Stadium opened in 1950 with a capacity of 70,000 seats. After improvements in 2006, the stadium is currently configured to seat 47,000 for football but can be readily reconfigured to its original capacity of 70,000, more than the total number of Rice alumni, living and deceased.

The Owls began playing football in 1914 as a member of the Southwest Conference. Until 1950, when First Community Stadium was completed, they played at Rice Field, the site of which is now Rice Track/Soccer Stadium. During its first 40 years, Rice's football program was a regional and national powerhouse. By the early 1960s, the program found it difficult to compete against schools that were ten times its size or more—and in some cases, had more freshmen than Rice had undergraduates. In 2006, the football team played in the New Orleans Bowl, the first time the team had gone to a bowl game since 1961, ending the second-longest bowl drought in the country at the time.

The Rice Owls play in the American Conference, having moved from Conference USA (CUSA) in July 2023.

The Rice Owls finished the 2008 Regular season with a 9–3 overall record (7–1 C-USA)—the first time they won more than seven games in over 40 years—and accepted a bid to play against Western Michigan University in the Texas Bowl on December 30 where they came away with a 38–14 victory for their first bowl victory since 1954.

At the end of the 2008 season wide receiver Jarett Dillard was named a 2nd Team All-American by the Football Writers Association, the first Rice Owl selected in 50 years. He has also been named an All-American by Sports Illustrated, CBSSports.com (where he was joined by fellow owls Chase Clement and James Casey), and Walter Camp.

In 2013, Rice finally won its first outright football conference championship since 1957, when it defeated Marshall in the Conference USA championship game.

Bowl game history	Result
1938 Cotton Bowl Classic	Rice 28 Colorado 14
1947 Orange Bowl	Rice 8 Tennessee 0
1950 Cotton Bowl Classic	Rice 27 North Carolina 13
1954 Cotton Bowl Classic	Rice 28 Alabama 6
1958 Cotton Bowl Classic	Rice 7 Navy 20
1961 Sugar Bowl	Rice 6 Ole Miss 14
1961 Bluebonnet Bowl	Rice 7 Kansas 33
2006 New Orleans Bowl	Rice 17 Troy 41
2008 Texas Bowl	Rice 38 Western Michigan 14
2012 Armed Forces Bowl	Rice 33 Air Force 14
2013 Liberty Bowl	Rice 7 Mississippi State 44
2014 Hawaii Bowl	Rice 30 Fresno State 6
2022 LendingTree Bowl	Rice 24 Southern Miss 38
2023 First Responder Bowl	Rice 21 Texas State 45

=== Men's basketball ===
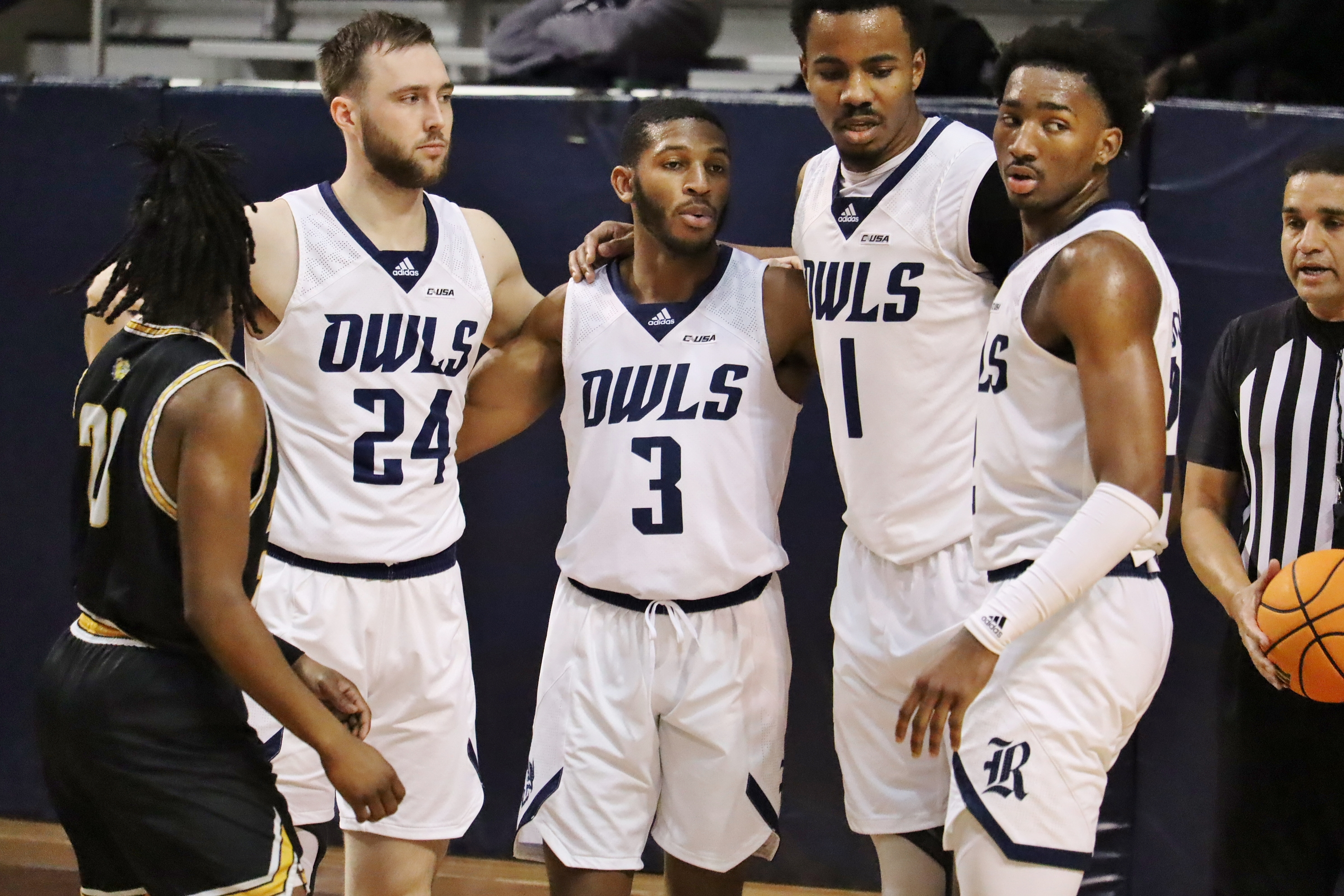
Members of the Rice Owls men's basketball team during a game at Tudor Fieldhouse in 2022

Rice's men's basketball teams won 10 conference titles in the former Southwest Conference (1918, 1935*, 1940, 1942*, 1943*, 1944*, 1945, 1949*, 1954*, 1970; * denotes shared title). Most recently, guard Morris Almond was selected in the 2007 NBA draft by the Utah Jazz.

=== Women's basketball ===
The Rice women's basketball team has achieved great success in recent years, having most recently won the 2021 Women's National Invitation Tournament after having won the Conference USA regular-season title in that season. The Owls' most recent NCAA tournament appearance was in 2019, when they won the Conference USA Tournament.

=== Women's sports ===
Rice has been more successful in its women's sports. In 2004–05, Rice sent its women's volleyball, soccer, and basketball teams to their respective NCAA tournaments. In 2005–06, the women's soccer, basketball, and tennis teams advanced to NCAA tournaments, and five individuals competed at the national championships in outdoor track and field. In 2006–07, the Rice women's basketball team made the NCAA tournament, while four Rice women's outdoor track and field athletes received individual NCAA berths, two of them earning All-America honors. In 2008–09, the Rice women's volleyball team went to NCAA playoffs again, where they played Wichita State in 08 and TCU 09.

=== Women's swimming & diving ===
Rice began women's swimming & diving competition in 1975 as a member of AIAW Division II. The program continued into the NCAA era through 1990–91, when changes in NCAA specifications for pool facilities led Rice to drop diving from its aquatics program.

In 2013, 2014, 2015 the Owls sent multiple swimmers to the NCAA Women's Division I Swimming and Diving Championships hosted in Indianapolis.

Rice frequently outscored its opponents in the swimming portion of conference championships, including its first American Conference season in 2023–24, but could not win a conference title due to its lack of divers. In January 2024, Rice announced the reinstatement of women's diving effective in 2024–25.

=== Men's tennis ===
Sam Match won the NCAA doubles championship with Rice University along with his doubles partner Bob Curtis in 1947.

The Owls were team runner-ups in the 1968 and 1970 NCAA men's tennis championship.

=== Women's golf ===
Rice will add women's golf in the 2026–27 school year, following a $5 million startup donation from energy industry executive and former Owls women's basketball player Lynn Elsenhans.

=== Notable non-varsity sports ===
==== Rugby ====
Founded in 1968, the Rice Rugby Football Club plays college rugby in Division I-AA in the Southwest Conference (SWC) against its traditional rivals such as the University of Houston. Rice have been led since 2007 by Head Coach Mario Botha, who formerly played professional rugby in South Africa. Rice won the Southwest Conference with a 6–0 conference record in 2013, advancing to the Division I-AA national playoffs. Previously, Rice finished second in the Southwest Conference in 2012, losing 36–26 to the University of Texas in the conference championship.

Rice rugby had a successful period during the late 1980s and throughout the 1990s, winning multiple Texas championships and producing players such as Mike Glass ('87) and Brannan Smoot ('89), who went on to play for the U.S. national rugby team. Rice rugby has been supported since 1996 by the Rice Rugby Alumni Association, which established an endowment fund in 1999 and since then has provided financial support to the team. Rice Rugby advanced to the national playoffs in the spring of 1997 and again in the spring of 2000.

==== Ultimate ====
Rice has men's and women's ultimate teams. The women's team, named Torque, won consecutive national championships in Division III in 2014 and 2015.

== Traditions ==
In addition to football, First Community Stadium also serves as the performance venue for the university's Marching Owl Band, or "MOB." Despite its name, the MOB is a scatter band which focuses on performing humorous skits and routines rather than traditional formation marching. Prior to the dissolution of the Southwest Conference, the MOB had a lesser rivalry with the "Fightin' Texas Aggie Band" from Texas A&M.

Rice's mascot is Sammy the Owl. In previous decades, the university kept several live owls on campus in front of Lovett College, but this practice has been discontinued. Rice University is one of three schools in the American Conference to use the owl as a mascot, alongside Temple University and Florida Atlantic University.

Rice also has a fourteen-member coed cheerleading squad and a co-ed dance team, both of which perform at football and basketball games throughout the year.

== Facilities ==
Facility	Sport(s)	Capacity
First Community Stadium	Football	47,000 (expandable to 60,000; to be downsized to ~30,000 by 2028)
Tudor Fieldhouse	Basketball, volleyball	5,208
Reckling Park	Baseball	7,000
Wendel D. Ley Track and Holloway Field	Soccer, track & field	1,500
George R. Brown Tennis Center	Tennis	600
Rice Aquatics Center Natatorium	Swimming	300

== See also ==
- Bayou Bucket Classic
