= South Florida Bulls =

University of South Florida athletic team

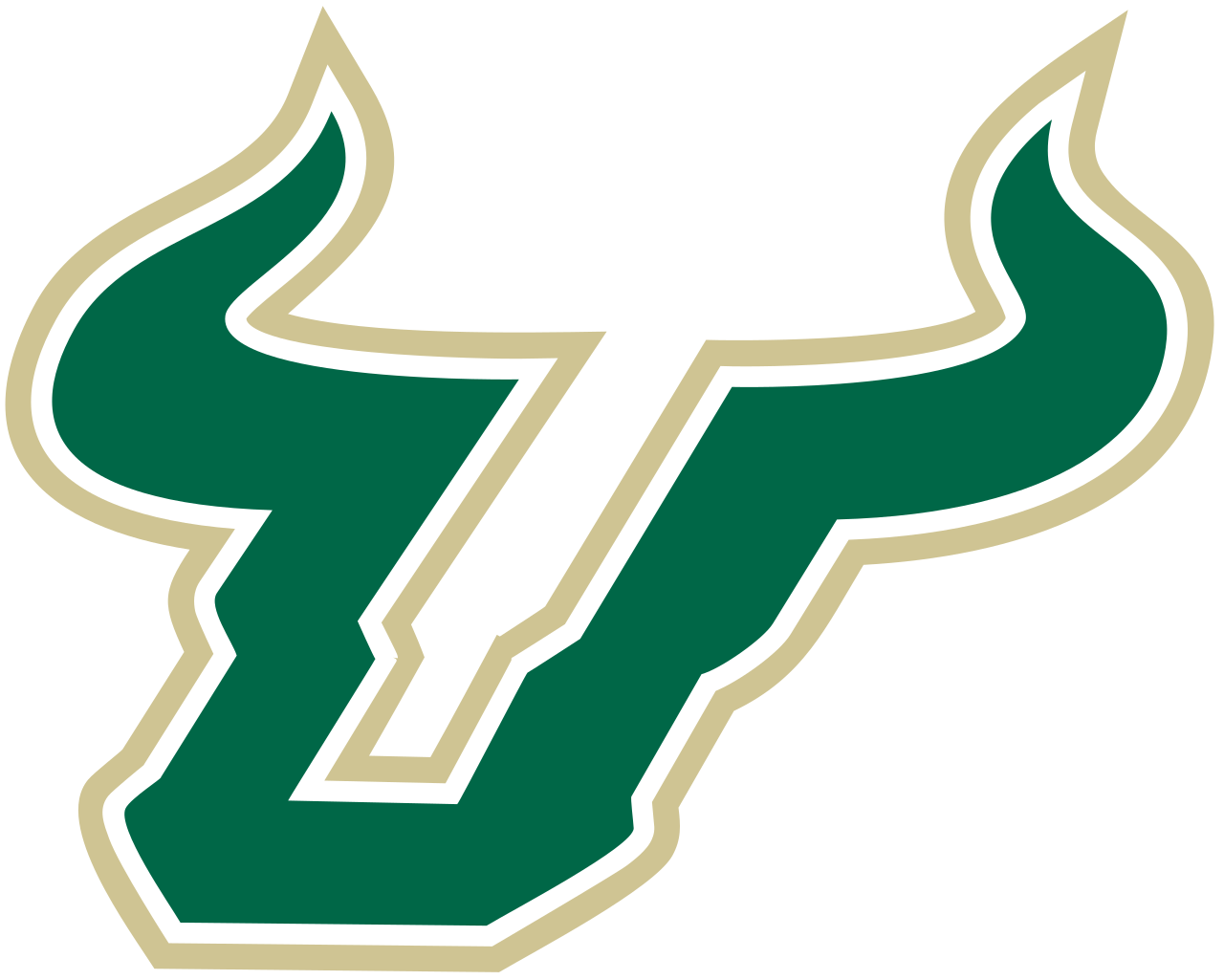
- University: University of South Florida
- Nickname: Bulls
- NCAA: Division I (FBS)
- Conference: American (primary); SAISA (sailing); CUSA (beach volleyball)
- Athletic director: Rob Higgins
- Location: Tampa, Florida; St. Petersburg, Florida (sailing team)
- First season: 1965
- Varsity teams: 21 (9 men's, 12 women's)
- Football stadium: Raymond James Stadium
- Basketball arena: Yuengling Center
- Ice hockey arena: AdventHealth Center Ice (club team)
- Baseball stadium: USF Baseball Stadium
- Softball stadium: USF Softball Stadium
- Soccer stadium: Corbett Stadium
- Lacrosse stadium: Corbett Stadium
- Golf course: The Claw
- Sailing venue: Haney Landing Sailing Center
- Tennis venue: USF Varsity Tennis Courts
- Outdoor track and field venue: USF Track and Field Stadium
- Volleyball arena: The Corral
- Colors: Green and gold
- Mascot: Rocky the Bull
- Marching band: Herd of Thunder
- Fight song: Golden Brahman March
- Website: gousfbulls.com

Team NCAA championships
- 1

Individual and relay NCAA champions
- 24

The South Florida Bulls (also known as the USF Bulls) are the athletic teams that represent the University of South Florida. USF competes in NCAA Division I and is a member of the American Conference for all sports besides beach volleyball, which competes in Conference USA because the American Conference does not sponsor the sport, and sailing, a non-NCAA sanctioned varsity sport which competes in the South Atlantic Intercollegiate Sailing Association within the Inter-Collegiate Sailing Association. Rob Higgins is the current athletic director, officially titled the CEO of Athletics. The school colors are green and gold and the mascot is Rocky D. Bull.

The university currently sponsors 21 varsity sports teams, nine for men and twelve for women. The sports sponsored are baseball, men's basketball, women's basketball, women's beach volleyball, men's and women's cross country, football, men's and women's golf, women's lacrosse, women's sailing, men's soccer, women's soccer, softball, men's and women's tennis, men's and women's track and field (outdoor and indoor for both), and women's volleyball. USF used to sponsor teams in co-ed rifle and men's and women's swimming and diving.

Across all sports, the Bulls have won one team NCAA national championship (women's swimming in 1985). Outside of the additional seven individual and three relay national championships in women's swimming, USF athletes have won six individual and one relay NCAA national championships in men's swimming, two individual NCAA national championships in rifle, four individual and one relay NCAA national championships in men's outdoor track and field, and one individual NCAA national championship in men's indoor track and field. Additionally, the university has won five national championships in varsity sports outside of NCAA competition. The softball team won the 1983 and 1984 national championships in the American Softball Association, which was the highest level of college softball at the time. Sailing, which is not an NCAA-sanctioned sport but is still a varsity team sponsored by the USF Athletic Department, has won three national championships in the Inter-Collegiate Sailing Association: Sloop in 2009 and Offshore Large Boats in 2016 and 2017. USF's teams have also won 177 conference championships, and athletes have won 261 individual and relay conference championships.

As of the 2024 Summer Olympics, 20 Bulls have competed as athletes in the Olympic Games, winning one gold medal.

== History ==
=== Beginnings ===
The University of South Florida was the first state university in Florida built during the 20th century. Although founded in 1956, the university was not officially named until the following year (1957), and classes did not begin until 1960. First president John S. Allen was originally against the prospect of the new university supporting intercollegiate athletic teams, instead wanting to focus on education. In 1962, still years before any sports were announced, students voted to make the Golden Brahman, a breed of bull, the university's first mascot because of Florida's history in cattle raising.

President Allen had a change of heart in 1964 and approved the university's first sports teams to begin in the 1965–66 academic year. Dr. Gilman Hertz served as head of physical education, intramural sports and athletics from 1960-66. On Oct 10, 1964, the USF Athletic Council announced the formation of six “sports clubs’’ in soccer, baseball, swimming, golf, tennis and track/cross country. Hertz said they would form the nucleus for intercollegiate athletic teams in the future. On May 4, 1965 it was announced that South Florida would field teams for the 1965-66 school year in baseball, men's soccer, men's cross country, men's golf, men's swimming, men's tennis, and women's tennis - the seven original sports to be offered by the young university. Hertz hired several coaches, including baseball coach Hubert “Beefy’’ Wright, swimming coach Bob Grindey and soccer coach Dan Holcomb.

The men's teams began play as NCAA College Division (now known as NCAA Division II) independents and were called the Golden Brahmans. Since the NCAA did not sponsor women's sports at the time, the new women's tennis team played as an independent in the Association for Intercollegiate Athletics for Women Small College Division and went by the Lady Brahmans instead of the Golden Brahmans. Subsequent women's teams would play in the AIAW and were called the Lady Brahmans as well.

The Golden Brahmans men's soccer team won the first intercollegiate game in school history on September 25, 1965, defeating Florida Southern College 4–3.

President Allen asked physical education professor and future USF Athletic Hall of Fame member Dick Bowers, who joined the physical education staff in 1963, to become athletic director. Bowers began his tenure as director of physical education, intramural sports and athletics on May 7, 1966, while Hertz stayed on as chairman of the physical education department and an instructor for more than 30 years. New facilities included a $1.8-million physical education building and a $250,000 modern track.

Bowers tenure as athletic director lasted until 1982. Under his leadership, he helped to establish the Sun Belt Conference, added 13 intercollegiate sports programs - including men's and women's basketball, and built several facilities, including the USF Sun Dome, Red McEwen Field, and a university golf course. Bowers helped put South Florida on the map by hiring big-name coaches including Robin Roberts for USF's baseball team and Lee Rose for USF's men's basketball team.

In 1969, swimmer Joe Lewkowicz won the first individual national championship in school history in the 200-yard butterfly.

=== 1970s ===
The original logo of the USF Golden Brahmans, used until 1981

The Golden Brahmans' men's swimming team nearly became the first team in USF history to win a national championship, finishing in second place in the 1971 NCAA Championship. The men's basketball team was founded in 1971 and was by far the most significant step in USF's young athletic history at the time. In spring 1972, USF's men's golf team were the runners up in the NCAA Championship. The Lady Brahmans women's basketball, women's golf, softball, women's swimming, and volleyball teams started the next academic year, and the university had also considered adding women's archery, badminton, and bowling to comply with the new Title IX law. The men's golf team then finished as national runners up again in 1973.

USF's men's sports made the jump to the NCAA University Division (now known as NCAA Division I) in fall 1973, and remained as independents. Likewise, USF's women's teams moved to the AIAW Large College Division in 1973. USF became a charter member of the Sun Belt Conference in 1976 (for men's sports only) as their first ever conference affiliation. That year, the men's soccer team became the first team in USF history to win a conference championship, winning both the regular season and tournament Sun Belt titles. In 1978, USF won the Sun Belt Cup (now known as the Vic Bubas Cup) for the first time as the Sun Belt Conference's all-sports champion for the 1977–78 academic year. They would go on to win the Cup again in each of the next four years and seven of the next eight.

=== 1980s ===
In 1981, the Golden Brahmans simplified their nickname to Bulls for their men's teams. Naturally, the women's teams soon picked up the nickname of Lady Bulls, though they were officially still called the Lady Brahmans. The AIAW dissolved after spring 1982, and all of USF's women's sports besides softball went on to immediately join the NCAA. In 1983, USF's softball team won the first team national championship in school history. Softball was not an NCAA sponsored sport at the time, so the championship was won in the American Softball Association, which governed the top level of collegiate softball. The Lady Brahmans won the ASA Championship again in the spring of 1984 before joining the NCAA the next year.

In spring 1985, USF's women's swimming team became the first, and as of 2023, only team in USF history to win a team NCAA championship. Two years later though in the spring of 1987, both the men's and women's swimming teams were cut due to financial hardships brought on by the sport not being sponsored by the Sun Belt, among other issues. The university added a women's cross country team the next fall to avoid Title IX violations. Also that fall, the school officially changed the name of all women's teams from Lady Brahmans to Bulls. In 1989, Michelle Scarborough won the 14th individual NCAA national championship in USF history in the air rifle event of the NCAA Rifle Championship. The Bulls rifle team finished as the runners up in the 1989 championship.

=== 1990s ===
Michelle Scarborough won another NCAA co-ed rifle championship in 1990, this time in the smallbore event. 1990 was also the ninth and final time USF won the Sun Belt Cup, as the school left the Sun Belt to join the Metro Conference starting in the 1991–92 school year. That same year, the men's and women's outdoor track and field teams were founded and Jon Dennis won the national title in the men's outdoor 5000 meter run, which he won again in 1993. The men's and women's indoor track and field teams were added that fall.

In 1995 the Metro Conference merged with the Great Midwest Conference to form Conference USA, giving USF their third conference allegiance in school history. This year also brought the Bulls women's soccer team to life.

USF added their most famous sport in 1997, beginning to play football as a Division I-AA independent. Fall 1997 was also the inaugural year of the Bulls sailing team, which is now USF's most successful sport with three national championships, albeit competing in the Inter-Collegiate Sailing Association rather than the NCAA.

=== 2000s ===
The football team became Division I-A in 2001 and joined Conference USA with the rest of USF's sports in 2003, but the school left the conference to join the Big East in 2005. USF football became very notable in the Big East, reaching as high as No. 2 in the BCS rankings in 2007. In spring 2009, USF's women's basketball team won the Women's National Invitation Tournament for the first postseason tournament victory in their history. The following fall, the sailing team won the fourth team national championship in school history in the Inter-Collegiate Sailing Association Sloop National Championship.

=== 2010s ===
The early 2010s brought lots of change to the university's athletic programs. Six new athletic facilities opened between 2011 and 2013: Corbett Soccer Stadium, USF Baseball Stadium, USF Softball Stadium, the Frank Morsani Football Practice Complex, the Pam and Les Muma Basketball Practice Center, and the Chowdhari Golf Center; plus extensive renovations were completed on the Yuengling Center, USF Track and Field Stadium, and USF Varsity Tennis Courts. The nearly $70 million project also included construction of recreational fields for baseball, softball, soccer, and more. In 2013, the new golf center became USF's first LEED certified athletics facility. The Yuengling Center was certified LEED Silver the following year.

Following the Big East Conference realignment in 2013, USF found itself as a charter member of the new American Athletic Conference (now known as the American Conference), where the Bulls still play today. The Bulls sailing team won their second ICSA national championship and the fifth team national championship in USF history in 2016 in the Offshore Large Boats competition and repeated as Offshore Large Boat champions in 2017.

Also in 2017, USF launched the Bulls Unlimited channel on TuneIn, becoming the second school in the country to have its own 24/7 digital radio station. The station is available for free worldwide and carries live play-by-play coverage of all games in eight different sports plus highlights, shows, and more. A second channel, Bulls Unlimited 2, was launched in 2019 and mostly carries game replays, as well as live game coverage when games are happening simultaneously in two sports.

=== 2020s ===
In 2021, the women's basketball team won their first conference titles with both the regular season and tournament American Conference crowns and became the first team besides Connecticut to win an American Conference title in the sport.

In November 2021, athletic director Michael Kelly announced that USF would add a women's lacrosse team beginning in the 2023–24 school year (later postponed to the 2024–25 school year), which will make it the first new sport at the school since 1997. The following February, USF announced that a women's beach volleyball team would be added in 2024–25 (later postponed to 2025–26). It was later announced that the beach volleyball team would play as members of Conference USA because the American Conference does not sponsor the sport.

In 2023, Romaine Beckford became the first USF athlete in 30 years to win an NCAA individual national championship after winning the title in the high jump at the 2023 NCAA Division I Indoor Track and Field Championships. In the 2023 NCAA Division I Outdoor Track and Field Championships three months later, Beckford won the high jump national title again. Also in 2023, USF's board of trustees approved funding for a new on-campus football stadium, scheduled to open for the 2027 season. The stadium will seat 35,000 fans, will be located at the Sycamore Fields, and will have amenities including tailgate areas, club seating, rooftop patios, DJ zones, and a west-side student section modeled on the "U" logo. The Bulls men's basketball team won their first regular season conference title in 2024 under first year head coach Amir Abdur-Rahim. In 2025, the men's track and field team won their first relay national championship, winning the outdoor 4x400.

Michael Kelly left his job as athletic director in 2025 to become the athletic director of Navy. The position was then rebranded to "CEO of Athletics" and Kelly was replaced by Rob Higgins, who is the first USF alumnus to head the athletic department.

Under first year head coach Bryan Hodgson in 2026, the Bulls men's basketball team won both the regular season and tournament conference titles and qualified for March Madness for the first time in 14 years. The lacrosse team also won their first ever conference championship in 2026, their second-ever season.

USF varsity teams have won a total of 177 conference championships and 6 national championships. The school's athletes have won an additional 235 individual conference championships, 26 relay conference championships, 19 individual national championships, and 5 relay national championships. Bulls teams also have four national runner-up finishes in the NCAA and two in the ICSA, plus numerous individual and relay national runner-up finishes.

=== Conference affiliations ===
The American Conference logo in South Florida's colors

- Independent (1965–1976)
- Sun Belt Conference (1976–1991)
- Metro Conference (1991–1995)
- Conference USA (1995–2005)
- Big East Conference (2005–2013)
- American Conference (2013–present)

== Varsity sports ==
Men's sports	Women's sports
Baseball	Basketball
Basketball	Beach volleyball
Cross country	Cross country
Football	Golf
Golf	Lacrosse
Soccer	Sailing
Tennis	Soccer
Track & field^{†}	Softball
	Tennis
	Track & field^{†}
	Volleyball
*– Indicates future teams † – Track and field includes both indoor and outdoor

USF sponsors 21 varsity sports teams, nine for men (baseball, basketball, cross country, football, golf, soccer, tennis, indoor track and field, and outdoor track and field) and twelve for women (basketball, beach volleyball, cross country, golf, lacrosse, sailing, soccer, softball, tennis, indoor track and field, outdoor track and field, and volleyball).

=== Football ===
The football team was founded in 1997 and plays its home games in Raymond James Stadium, which is also the home field of the National Football League's Tampa Bay Buccaneers.

==== Jim Leavitt era ====
Under head coach Jim Leavitt, USF began college football play as a Division I-AA (now Division I FCS) independent for their first four seasons, finishing with a winning record three times and ranked in the AP Poll twice. During their final year in Division I-AA, the Bulls beat three teams ranked in the DI-AA top 15: No. 13 James Madison, No. 6 Western Kentucky, and No. 1 Troy State; as well as Division I-A Connecticut. That team finished with a 7–4 record, with all four losses coming to Division I-A opponents. They were ineligible for the Division I-AA playoffs as they were to transition to Division I-A the following year.

The team grew rapidly and moved to Division I-A in 2001, where they remained an independent. In 2003, the Bulls moved to Conference USA, but they would leave for the Big East Conference in 2005. The Big East eventually became the American Athletic Conference in 2013 (later rebranded to American Conference) as part of the major college football conference realignment.

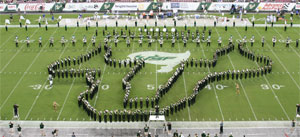
The Herd of Thunder performing before a game

On November 16, 2002, USF beat No. 25 Bowling Green State University, its first victory over a ranked Division I-A opponent. On September 24, 2005, USF surprised No. 9 Louisville for its first victory over a Big East conference foe. As a result, USF received its first ever votes in the AP Poll. South Florida received increased press coverage for their upsets of Top 25 ranked teams such as West Virginia (2006, 2007, 2009), Auburn (2007), Kansas (2008) and Florida State (2009).

On September 16, 2007, a week after defeating Auburn, USF was nationally ranked for the first time in the young program's history. The AP Poll listed USF at No. 23, while the USA Today Coaches Poll had the Bulls at No. 24. This was an NCAA record, as USF achieved its first Top 25 ranking faster than any other Division I-A team in the modern era with 104 weeks. On October 14, 2007, after the AP, Coaches', and BCS rankings were released, the Bulls were ranked No. 2, No. 3, and No. 2 respectively, the highest ranked the football program has ever been. However, the following week, the Bulls lost to Rutgers in a 30–27 upset in Piscataway, New Jersey. The Bulls finished the 2007 season 9–3 ranked No. 21 in the BCS standings, and earned a spot in the Sun Bowl, which they lost to Oregon.

On September 12, 2008, the Bulls defeated No. 11 ranked Kansas 37–34 at Raymond James Stadium. USF would win its next two games, getting to 5–0, and being ranked No. 10 in the AP Poll, before losing to Pittsburgh 26–21. The Bulls finished the season 7–5, which earned them a spot in the inaugural St. Petersburg Bowl against the Memphis Tigers, where they won the first bowl game in school history 41–14.

On September 26, 2009, USF defeated No. 18 Florida State 17–7 at Doak Campbell Stadium in Tallahassee. On October 4, 2009, the Bulls entered the AP rankings for the first time in the season, coming at No. 23 after beating Syracuse 34–20. The following week, they lost to highly favored No. 8 Cincinnati. The Bulls would finish the season 8–5 and received a bid to the International Bowl against the Northern Illinois Huskies. The Bulls would go on to win 27–3.

Jim Leavitt was fired on January 8, 2010, after an investigation alleged that he grabbed a player by the shoulder pads and struck him twice across the face. The investigation also claimed that Leavitt interfered with the investigation by telling several coaches and players to change their stories. Leavitt maintains he never struck the player, but was merely trying to console him, and after a wrongful termination suit against USF, the university eventually settled with Leavitt for $2.75 million.

==== Skip Holtz era ====
On January 14, 2010, Skip Holtz was hired away from East Carolina and named the team's second head coach. The Bulls went 8–5 in Holtz's first season, finishing it off with a 31–26 Meineke Car Care Bowl victory over Clemson. USF started the 2011 season on a high note, defeating No. 16 Notre Dame 23–20 at Notre Dame Stadium. The Bulls reached No. 16 in the AP Poll after starting the season 4–0 but would struggle for the rest of season, finishing with a record of 5–7 and failed to qualify for a bowl game for the first time in 7 seasons. The Bulls' 2012 was its worst ever at the time, as the team finished 3–9.

==== Willie Taggart era ====
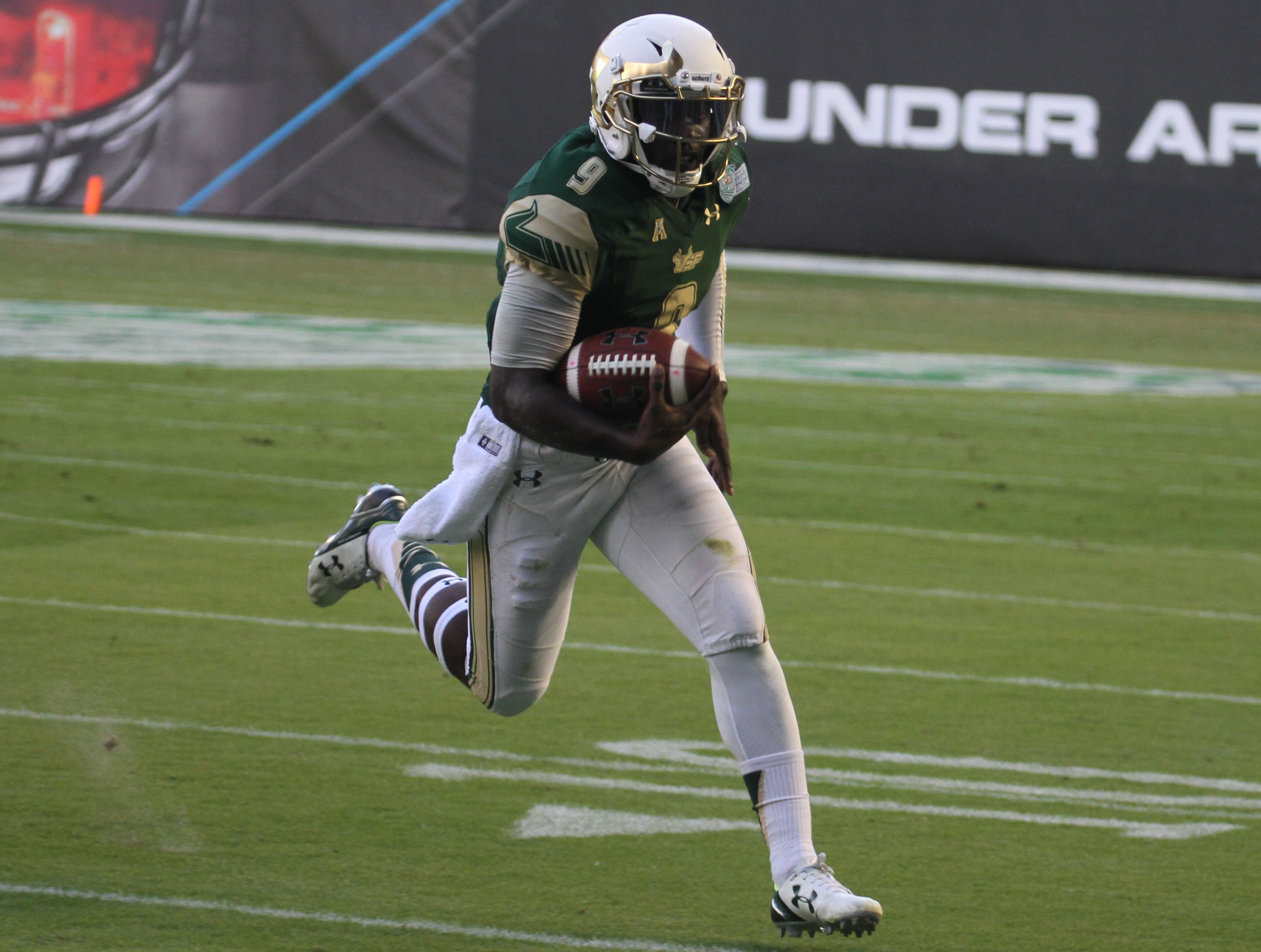
Quarterback Quinton Flowers during the 2015 Miami Beach Bowl

On December 8, 2012, USF announced that Willie Taggart, who previously coached at Western Kentucky, would be the third head coach in USF football history. The Bulls struggled in Taggart's first year, posting a 2–10 record, however, the team improved slightly in his second year, finishing 4–8. Taggart finished his third season at USF 8–5 with a loss in the Miami Beach Bowl to Western Kentucky. In Week 5 of 2016 against Cincinnati, Marlon Mack passed Andre Hall to become the leading rusher in program history. Two weeks later, in a Week 7 game against UConn, Mack passed B.J. Daniels to become the program leader in rushing touchdowns. During their Week 9 game against No. 22 Navy, the Bulls set a school record for rushing yards in a game, racking up 412 yards in a 52–45 victory. The Bulls broke that record two weeks later in their Week 11 game against Memphis, rushing for 416 yards in a 49–42 victory. Also in that game, the Bulls broke the school record for offensive touchdowns in a season (58). In a Week 12 game against SMU, Quinton Flowers passed Matt Grothe to become the school leader in single season total offense. The Bulls secured their first 10 win season after a 48–31 victory over UCF in Week 13. During that game, Quinton Flowers set the school record for single season rushing yards (1,425), passing the mark Marlon Mack set in 2015. On November 30, 2016, Quniton Flowers was named the American Athletic Conference Offensive Player of the Year, which is the first such award in school history. The Bulls ended their season with a 46–39 overtime victory over South Carolina in the Birmingham Bowl on December 29, 2016. On January 12, 2017, Quinton Flowers was named the 2017 College Football Performance Awards National Performer of the Year. Taggart left after the season to become the coach at Oregon.

==== Charlie Strong era ====
USF hired former Texas head coach Charlie Strong as their new head coach on December 11, 2016. The 2017 Bulls earned their second straight 10 win season after beating Texas Tech in the Birmingham Bowl. The Bulls started 2018 with a 7–0 record, but did not win another game and finished 7–6. Strong was fired after the 2019 campaign, finishing 4–8.

==== Jeff Scott era ====
The Bulls hired former Clemson offensive coordinator Jeff Scott as their new head coach on December 9, 2019. Scott won two College Football Playoff National Championships with Clemson. His first season, shortened by the COVID-19 pandemic, was the worst in program history, finishing with a 1–8 record. Scott was fired in 2022 with three games remaining in the season after compiling a total record of 4–26. Special teams coach Daniel Da Prato was named interim head coach for the remainder of the season. The Bulls lost their three remaining games, but played with notable improvements.

==== Alex Golesh era ====
Tennessee offensive coordinator Alex Golesh, a Broyles Award finalist, was hired as USF's sixth football head coach on December 4, 2022. During his first season, freshman quarterback Byrum Brown broke Quinton Flowers' single-season passing record to become the first USF quarterback to throw for more than 3,000 yards in a season. That year, the Bulls qualified for their first bowl game since 2018 and faced former Big East rival Syracuse in the Boca Raton Bowl. They won the game 45–0, the largest shutout in college bowl history and USF's first bowl win since 2017.

On December 5, 2023, USF released renderings for a new on-campus football stadium, which is expected to open in 2027. The stadium will be built on the east side of campus near the current track and field stadium and will seat 35,000 fans, with room to expand the capacity to over 50,000.

Some notable former USF football players are George Selvie, Jason Pierre-Paul, Marquez Valdes-Scantling, and Marlon Mack.

Brian Hartline era

On December 3, 2025, USF announced that Brian Hartline, previously the offensive coordinator/wide receivers coach at Ohio State, would become the program's seventh head coach.

=== Men's basketball ===
The birth of the basketball program at the University of South Florida was in 1971. The first game was a 74–73 victory at Stetson University. The Bulls inaugural season ended with a record of 8–17. Since 1980, home games have been played at what is now the Yuengling Center. The Bulls have made the NCAA Division I men's basketball tournament four times and the NIT nine times. The team has won two regular season conference titles and two conference tournament. They are coached by Chris Mack.

The Bulls won their first postseason tournament in the 2019 College Basketball Invitational.

Notable men's basketball players who went to USF include Chucky Atkins and Dominique Jones.

=== Women's basketball ===
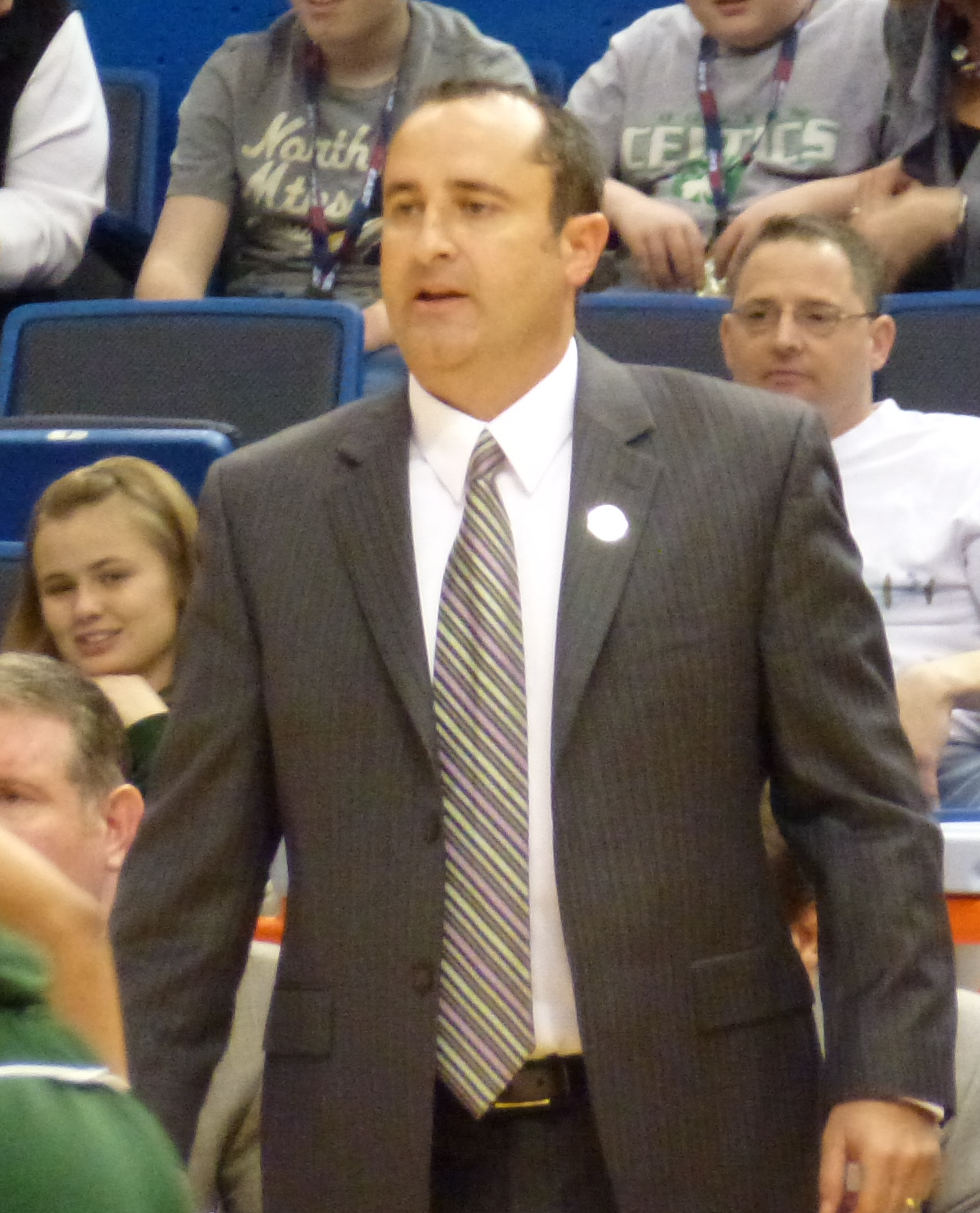
Jose Fernandez, USF's women's basketball coach

The women's basketball team was founded in 1972. The current head coach is Jose Fernandez. Fernandez arrived in Tampa in April 2000, as a women's basketball assistant coach and was officially named head coach on December 14, 2000. Under his lead, USF advanced to the program's first ever NCAA tournament during the 2005–06 season, and to 10 postseason tournaments in 11 years after the Bulls had recorded just five winning seasons in the 28-year history of the team before Fernandez became head coach.

Fernandez has also guided USF to nine 20-win campaigns in his career with the Bulls. On April 4, 2009, Fernandez led the team to their first ever post season championship with a 75–71 win over the Kansas Jayhawks in the WNIT. Fernandez also coached USF's first NCAA women's basketball tournament game, beating Texas Tech in the first round of the 2013 NCAA Tournament. The Bulls have made the NCAA Tournament ten times and the Women's National Invitation Tournament nine times in their history. They have won four conference championships, two in the regular season and two in the American Conference Tournament.

Notable former USF women's basketball players include Courtney Williams and Wanda Guyton. Former Bull Bethy Mununga competed in the 2024 Summer Olympics for Belgium.

=== Baseball ===
The head baseball coach is Mitch Hannahs. The team plays at USF Baseball Stadium at Red McEwen Field on the Tampa campus.

The program has won eleven combined regular season and tournament conference titles and made 14 NCAA Tournaments. USF has produced many MLB players and managers including National Baseball Hall of Fame member Tony La Russa. Pitchers have thrown one perfect game and three no hitters in school history. 137 USF players have been selected in the MLB draft as of 2022, including five first round picks.

Some notable USF baseball alumni include Shane McClanahan, Tim Hulett, and Dan Otero.

=== Beach volleyball ===
The women's beach volleyball team was originally scheduled to begin play in spring 2025. However, the starting year was later pushed back to spring 2026. They will play on campus with a new facility planned to be built on the north side of the Yuengling Center. Because beach volleyball is not sanctioned by the American Conference, the team will play as members of Conference USA. Pri Piantadosi-Lima will be the team's first head coach.

=== Men's cross country ===
The Bulls men's cross country team began in 1965 and has won seven team conference championships and nine individual conference championships. They have qualified for the NCAA Men's Division I Cross Country Championship four times. The cross country and track and field programs are directed by Erik Jenkins; the men's cross country team is coached by Tony Nicolosi along with the women's team and the distance running events for the men's and women's track & field teams.

=== Women's cross country ===
South Florida's women's cross country was founded in 1987 and has won five conference titles, back to back NCAA South Regional championships in 1999 and 2000, and one individual conference championship. They have qualified for the NCAA Women's Division I Cross Country Championship five times.

=== Men's golf ===
The men's golf coach is Steve Bradley. The team was founded in 1966 and finished as the NCAA College Division runners-up in 1972 and 1973. The Bulls have won 18 conference championships, including 11 straight from 1979 to 1989 as members of the Sun Belt Conference. Team members have also won 13 individual conference championships. The 2015 team finished fifth in the NCAA Championship.

=== Women's golf ===
The women's golf coach is Erika Brennan, who was hired in 2018.

They have won 6 conference championships and a Florida women's golf state title. Their highest finish in the NCAA Championship is fourth, achieved in 1991. Team members have won three individual conference championships.

=== Lacrosse ===
The women's lacrosse team is scheduled to become the first sport added at USF since 1997 when it begins play in spring 2025. The team was originally scheduled to begin in spring 2024, but was postponed. They will play home games at Corbett Stadium, the current home of the Bulls soccer teams, but have plans to move to the on-campus football stadium when it opens in 2027. They have won one regular season conference championship, doing so in their second-ever season in 2026.

The team is coached by Mindy McCord.

=== Sailing ===
The Bulls women's sailing program is a nationally recognized team and is USF's most successful sport by number of national championships won. Since 2004 the team has been coached by Allison Jolly, gold medalist in the first Olympic women's sailing event at the 1988 Summer Olympics in Seoul. As sailing is not an American Conference or NCAA sanctioned sport, USF is a member of the South Atlantic Intercollegiate Sailing Association within the Inter-Collegiate Sailing Association.

The varsity sailing team was formed in 1997 after being a popular club team for USF St. Petersburg students for many years before that. The team uses a waterfront facility on Bayboro Harbor on the University of South Florida's St. Petersburg campus called the Haney Landing Sailing Center. It is the only varsity sport based on USF's St. Petersburg campus.

The USF sailing team won the Inter-Collegiate Sailing Association Sloop National Championship in 2009 and back to back ICSA Offshore Large Boats National Championships in 2016 and 2017. They were National Runners Up at the ICSA Singlehanded National Championships in 2009 and 2011. The Bulls represented the United States in the 2017 and 2018 Student Yachting World Cups. They have also won 13 SAISA conference championships.

One USF sailor, Paige Railey, has competed in the Olympics, representing the United States in 2012, 2016, and 2020.

=== Men's soccer ===
Men's soccer was the first NCAA sport ever played at USF, beginning in 1965. The Bulls won the NCAA College Division state championship in 1966 going undefeated at 10–0–1. In 1976, the team won the first conference championship in school history across all sports by winning the regular season Sun Belt title, which they followed up by winning the inaugural Sun Belt Conference tournament too.

The Bulls have made the NCAA Tournament 23 times (including the Elite Eight three of those times) and have won 27 total conference championships (13 regular season and 14 tournament), the most of any program at USF.

Notable USF men's soccer alumni include Roy Wegerle, Jeff Cunningham, and Mark Chung.

=== Women's soccer ===
The Bulls women's soccer team was founded in 1995. The team is led by coach Chris Brown, who is the third head coach in the program's history. He joined the program as the team's associate head coach in December 2006 and was named head coach following the 2023 season after his wife and longtime head coach Denise Schilte-Brown left the team to become coach of Tampa Bay Sun FC. He previously coached at VCU. The women's soccer team has made seven appearances in the NCAA Tournament, and have won seven combined regular season and tournament conference championships, including during an undefeated regular season and conference tournament run in 2020. They most recently won a regular season conference title in 2021.

Notable former USF women's soccer players include Christiane Endler and Évelyne Viens. Six USF women's soccer players have competed in the Olympics.

=== Softball ===
The Bulls softball team began NCAA play in 1985. The team has won 11 total regular season and tournament conference championships and reached 18 NCAA Tournaments. Additionally, the team has made one NCAA Women's College World Series (2012).

Ken Eriksen, who played baseball for USF from 1981 to 1984, has been the head coach of the team since 1996 and is the winningest coach across all sports in USF history. He became the first coach at USF to reach 1,000 wins in any sport after pitcher Georgina Corrick's no hitter on April 30, 2021. Eriksen also managed the United States women's national softball team from 2011 to 2022.

Prior to 1985, Bulls softball played in the Association for Intercollegiate Athletics for Women, which disbanded in 1982; and the American Softball Association, which sanctioned college softball after the collapse of the AIAW until the NCAA started sponsoring the sport in 1985. They made the AIAW Women's College World Series in 1976 and 1981 and won the ASA National Championship in 1983 and 1984. They have won eight combined regular season and tournament conference championships.

USF pitchers have thrown five perfect games and 27 no hitters as of the end of the 2022 season. In 2022, Georgina Corrick became the first pitching triple crown winner in NCAA softball history, leading the nation in wins, strikeouts, and ERA.

=== Men's tennis ===
The men's head coach is Ashley Fisher, who was hired after the 2016 season. The Bulls men's tennis team has won 20 conference championships, the second-most of any USF team. They have also qualified for 18 NCAA tournaments, advancing to the Round of 16 for their best ever finish in 2015.

=== Women's tennis ===
The women's tennis team is coached by Cristina Moros. They have won 13 conference titles and made 12 NCAA tournaments as well as four United States Lawn Tennis Association tournaments (where they finished third in 1970 and 1971) and three AIAW tournaments.

=== Men's track and field ===
USF men's track & field team has won three indoor conference titles and two outdoor conference titles; its athletes have won four individual national championships (one indoor and three outdoor) and one outdoor relay national championship, plus 42 individual indoor, 5 relay indoor, 65 individual outdoor and 7 relay outdoor conference championships. They, along with the women's team, are coached by Abigi Id-Deen (sprinting and field events) and Tony Nicolosi (distance events). The program as a whole, along with the cross country teams, is directed by Erik Jenkins.

Team members have also won four individual national championships and one relay national championship. Jon Dennis won the national title in the 1992 and 1993 outdoor 5,000-meter run and Romaine Beckford won the national title in the 2023 indoor and 2023 outdoor high jump. The men's 4x400m team won the relay title at the 2025 NCAA Division I Outdoor Track and Field Championships.

The USF men's track & field program has produced three Olympians: Llewelyn Bredwood of Jamaica in 2000, Kemel Thompson of Jamaica in 2000 and 2004, and Abdul-Rasheed Saminu of Ghana in 2024.

=== Women's track and field ===
The Bulls women's track & field team has won three indoor and three outdoor conference championships, along with producing 43 individual indoor, 4 relay indoor, 59 individual outdoor and 10 relay outdoor conference champions.

The USF women's track & field team has produced four Olympians: Damu Cherry of the United States in 2008, Dayana Octavien of Haiti in 2008, Sasha Springer-Jones of Trinidad and Tobago in 2008, and Zahira Allers-Liburd of Saint Kitts and Nevis in 2024.

=== Volleyball ===
The women's volleyball team was founded in 1972. The Bulls have made the NCAA Tournament seven times and won 19 combined conference regular season and tournament championships, the most of any USF women's teams.

Former USF volleyball player Jolene Shepardson is the current head coach.

=== Discontinued varsity sports ===
==== Swimming and diving ====
Men's swimming and diving was one of the original sports at USF in 1965. Joe Lewkowicz of the team won the first individual national title in school history with the 1969 200-yard butterfly event. The 12 time All-American also won the 1972 400-yard medley relay national championship with other members of the team. The program as a whole won six individual national titles and one relay national title during its existence, and finished as national runners up in 1971.

USF's women's swimming national championship trophy on display at the Lee Roy Selmon Athletic Center

The women's swimming and diving team was founded in 1972. USF's only team NCAA national championship came in women's swimming and diving in 1985. The 1984–85 team alone won five individual national titles, two relay national titles, and racked up 35 All-American honors. All 10 members of the team as well as the coaching staff were inducted into the USF Athletic Hall of Fame's inaugural class in 2009. During its existence, members of the team won an additional two individual and one relay national championship and the team earned a third-place finish at the 1984 NCAA Championship.

Financial difficulties, along with the sport not being sponsored by the Sun Belt Conference, led to both the men's and women's teams being cut after the 1986–87 season.

==== Rifle ====
The co-ed rifle team only existed from 1985 to 1990 and competed in four NCAA Rifle Championships. In spite of this, the team did extremely well each time, finishing fifth in the 1986 NCAA Championship, third in the 1987 and 1988 NCAA Championships and second in the 1989 NCAA Championship. They also won the NRA Smallbore Intercollegiate Sectionals in 1987.

USF Hall of Fame inductee Michelle Scarborough won two individual national titles with the Bulls rifle team, winning championships in the 1989 air rifle event and the 1990 smallbore event (smallbore is considered the more prestigious of the two events in college riflery). Rifle is one of the only NCAA sponsored sports where men and women directly compete against each other, meaning that Scarborough was not only the best woman at these events, but shot better than all the men as well. Scarborough scored a record 399/400 in her 1989 air rifle championship, which stood as the highest score in the event until the format changed from 40 shots to 60 shots in 2005.

Three Bulls shooters have competed in the Olympics. Dorothee Deuring represented Austria in 1988, Kristen Peterson represented the United States in 1988 and 1992, and Peter Durben represented the United States in 1992. Other athletes competed internationally as well. Most notably, Michelle Scarborough won three team gold and an individual bronze medal at the 1991 Pan American Games and Matthew Suggs won a team gold and individual silver medal at the 1987 ISSF 10 meter air rifle world championship.

USF's rifle program was short lived. Michelle Scarborough was the only representative of the university in the 1990 NCAA Rifle Championship and was the last to do so, as the team was discontinued after that season.

== Championships ==
=== NCAA National Championships ===
==== Team national championships ====
One USF team has won an NCAA national championship.

- Women's swimming and diving (1): 1985

==== Individual national championships ====
Nine Bulls have combined to win 19 individual national championships across five sports.

- Men's outdoor track and field: 3
- Men's indoor track and field: 1
- Rifle: 2
- Men's swimming and diving: 6
- Women's swimming and diving: 7

==== Relay national championships ====
A combined five relay teams from three different sports have won national championships for USF.

- Men's swimming and diving: 1
- Women's swimming and diving: 3
- Men's outdoor track and field: 1

==== List of individual and relay national champions ====
These are the 19 individual and five relay NCAA titles won by USF athletes.

Sport	Year	Athlete or relay team	Event
Men's swimming and diving	1969	Joe Lewkowicz	200-yard butterfly
Men's swimming and diving	1971	Rick Morehead	100-yard breaststroke
Men's swimming and diving	1971	Rick Morehead	200-yard breaststroke
Men's swimming and diving	1971	Rick Morehead	200-yard individual medley
Men's swimming and diving	1972	Rick Morehead	200-yard breaststroke
Men's swimming and diving	1972	Rick Morehead	200-yard individual medley
Men's swimming and diving	1972	John Stevens, Rick Morehead, Joe Lewkowicz, Mike Sheffield	400-yard medley relay
Women's swimming and diving	1983	Theresa Day	200-yard individual medley
Women's swimming and diving	1984	Alicia McHugh	100-yard freestyle
Women's swimming and diving	1984	Nancy Bercaw, Merit Greaves, Margaret Mortell, Alicia McHugh	400-yard freestyle relay
Women's swimming and diving	1985	Alicia McHugh	100-yard freestyle
Women's swimming and diving	1985	Dawn Hewitt	100-yard backstroke
Women's swimming and diving	1985	Dawn Hewitt	200-yard backstroke
Women's swimming and diving	1985	Suzanne Crenshaw	500-yard freestyle
Women's swimming and diving	1985	Suzanne Crenshaw	1,650-yard freestyle
Women's swimming and diving	1985	Dawn Hewitt, Merit Greaves, Margaret Mortell, Nancy Bercaw	200-yard medley relay
Women's swimming and diving	1985	Dawn Hewitt, Nancy Bercaw, Margaret Mortell, Alicia McHugh	400-yard medley relay
Rifle	1989	Michelle Scarborough	Air rifle
Rifle	1990	Michelle Scarborough	Smallbore
Men's outdoor track and field	1992	Jon Dennis	5,000-meter run
Men's outdoor track and field	1993	Jon Dennis	5,000-meter run
Men's outdoor track and field	2023	Romaine Beckford	High jump
Men's outdoor track and field	2025	Devontie Archer, Alexavier Monfries, Corey Ottey Gabriel Moronta	4x400-meter relay
Men's indoor track and field	2023	Romaine Beckford	High jump

=== Non-NCAA National Championships ===
This section lists national championships won by varsity USF teams outside the scope of NCAA competition. Club teams are not included in this list.

Year	Sport	Competition	League
1983	Softball	–	American Softball Association
1984	Softball	–	American Softball Association
2009	Sailing	Sloop	Inter-Collegiate Sailing Association
2016	Sailing	Offshore Large Boats	Inter-Collegiate Sailing Association
2017	Sailing	Offshore Large Boats	Inter-Collegiate Sailing Association

=== Conference championships ===
==== Team conference championships ====
USF has won 177 team conference championships. 42 of these championships have come as members of the American Conference (noted by italics). RS indicates regular season conference titles while T indicates conference tournament titles, where applicable.

- Baseball (11 (Note: 6 regular season, 5 tournament)): 1982 (RS+T), 1986 (RS+T), 1989 (RS), 1990 (T), 1993 (RS), 1995 (RS+T), 1996 (RS), 2021 (T)
- Men's basketball (4 (Note: 2 regular season, 2 tournament)): 1990 (T), 2024 (RS), 2026 (RS+T)
- Women's basketball (4 (Note: 2 regular season, 2 tournament)): 2021 (RS+T), 2023 (RS), 2025 (T)
- Men's cross country (7): 1990, 1991, 1992, 1993, 1997, 1998, 2000
- Women's cross country (5): 1990, 1991, 1994, 1998, 1999
- Men's golf (18): 1979, 1980, 1981, 1982, 1983, 1984, 1985, 1986, 1987, 1988, 1989, 2013, 2015, 2016, 2017, 2018, 2021, 2024
- Women's golf (6): 1996, 1998, 1999, 2000, 2003, 2012
- Lacrosse (1) (Note: 1 regular season, 0 tournament): 2026 (RS)
- Sailing (13): 1998, 2002, 2003, 2004, 2006, 2008, 2009, 2011, 2012, 2014, 2015, 2023, 2025
- Men's soccer (27 (Note: 13 regular season, 14 tournament)): 1976 (RS+T), 1977 (T), 1979 (T), 1980 (RS+T), 1981 (RS+T), 1982 (RS+T), 1983 (RS), 1984 (RS), 1985 (RS+T), 1986 (T), 1988 (T), 1991 (T), 1996 (RS+T), 1997 (RS), 1998 (RS+T), 2005 (RS), 2008 (T), 2011 (RS), 2013 (T), 2016 (RS)
- Women's soccer (7 (Note: 4 regular season, 3 tournament)): 1998 (RS), 2017 (T), 2018 (RS), 2019 (T), 2020 (RS+T), 2021 (RS)
- Softball (11 (Note: 8 regular season, 3 tournament)): 1996 (RS), 1997 (RS), 1998 (RS), 2008 (RS), 2013 (T), 2016 (RS), 2018 (RS), 2019 (RS), 2025 (T), 2026 (RS+T)
- Men's tennis (20): 1977, 1978, 1979, 1980, 1985, 1986, 1987, 1988, 1990, 1995, 1996, 1998, 1999, 2002, 2009, 2014, 2015, 2016, 2017, 2019
- Women's tennis (13): 1984, 1985, 1986, 1991, 1992, 1993, 1994, 1995, 1997, 2002, 2007, 2014, 2017
- Men's track and field (5 (Note: 3 indoor, 2 outdoor)): 2024 (indoor+outdoor), 2025 (indoor+outdoor), 2026 (indoor)
- Women's track and field (6 (Note: 3 indoor, 3 outdoor)): 1994 (outdoor), 1995 (indoor+outdoor), 2000 (indoor), 2001 (indoor), 2003 (outdoor)
- Volleyball (19 (Note: 12 regular season, 7 tournament)): 1983 (RS), 1984 (RS), 1985 (RS), 1986 (RS+T), 1987 (T), 1988 (RS+T), 1989 (RS+T), 1993 (RS), 1995 (T), 1996 (RS+T), 1997 (RS), 2000 (RS), 2002 (RS+T), 2024 (RS)

==== Individual conference championships ====
Bulls athletes have combined to win 235 individual conference championships.

- Men's cross country: 9
- Women's cross country: 1
- Men's golf: 13
- Women's golf: 3
- Men's indoor track and field: 42
- Men's outdoor track and field: 65
- Women's indoor track and field: 43
- Women's outdoor track and field: 59

==== Relay conference championships ====
26 relay teams from USF have won conference championships.

- Men's indoor track and field: 7
- Men's outdoor track and field: 5
- Women's indoor track and field: 4
- Women's outdoor track and field: 10

==== All-sport conference titles ====
USF has won nine all-sport conference titles as a program, however the Sun Belt Conference is the only conference USF has competed in to offer such a competition while USF was a member (1976–77 until 1990–91). The Bulls won the Sun Belt Cup in the following seasons: 1977–78, 1978–79, 1979–80, 1980–81, 1981–82, 1983–84, 1984–85, 1985–86, and 1989–90.

== Athletes ==
=== USF Athletic Hall of Fame ===

The University of South Florida Athletic Hall of Fame was established in 2009 to recognize and perpetuate the memory of student athletes, teams, coaches and administrators who have made demonstrably outstanding and significant contributions to the success, tradition and heritage of USF Athletics, and who demonstrate the character and values that define the highest principles of sport. Induction in the University of South Florida Athletic Hall of Fame is the highest honor afforded by the USF Athletic Department.

Athletic Director Mark Harlan refused to induct new members into the Hall of Fame during his tenure from 2014 to 2018, but Michael Kelly reinstated the Hall in 2019 after taking over as AD. As of the 2024 class, the Hall features 50 members including athletic directors Dick Bowers and Lee Roy Selmon, coach Bobby Paschal, and athletes Charlie Bradley, George Selvie, and Courtney Williams.

The Hall of Fame is located within the Lee Roy Selmon Athletics Center on USF's Tampa campus.

=== Bulls in the Olympics ===
20 USF alumni have participated as athletes in the Olympic Games, representing 13 countries in 9 sports. 19 of these athletes competed in the Summer Olympics and one competed in the Winter Olympics. Every Summer Olympics since 1988 besides 1996 have featured at least one Bull.

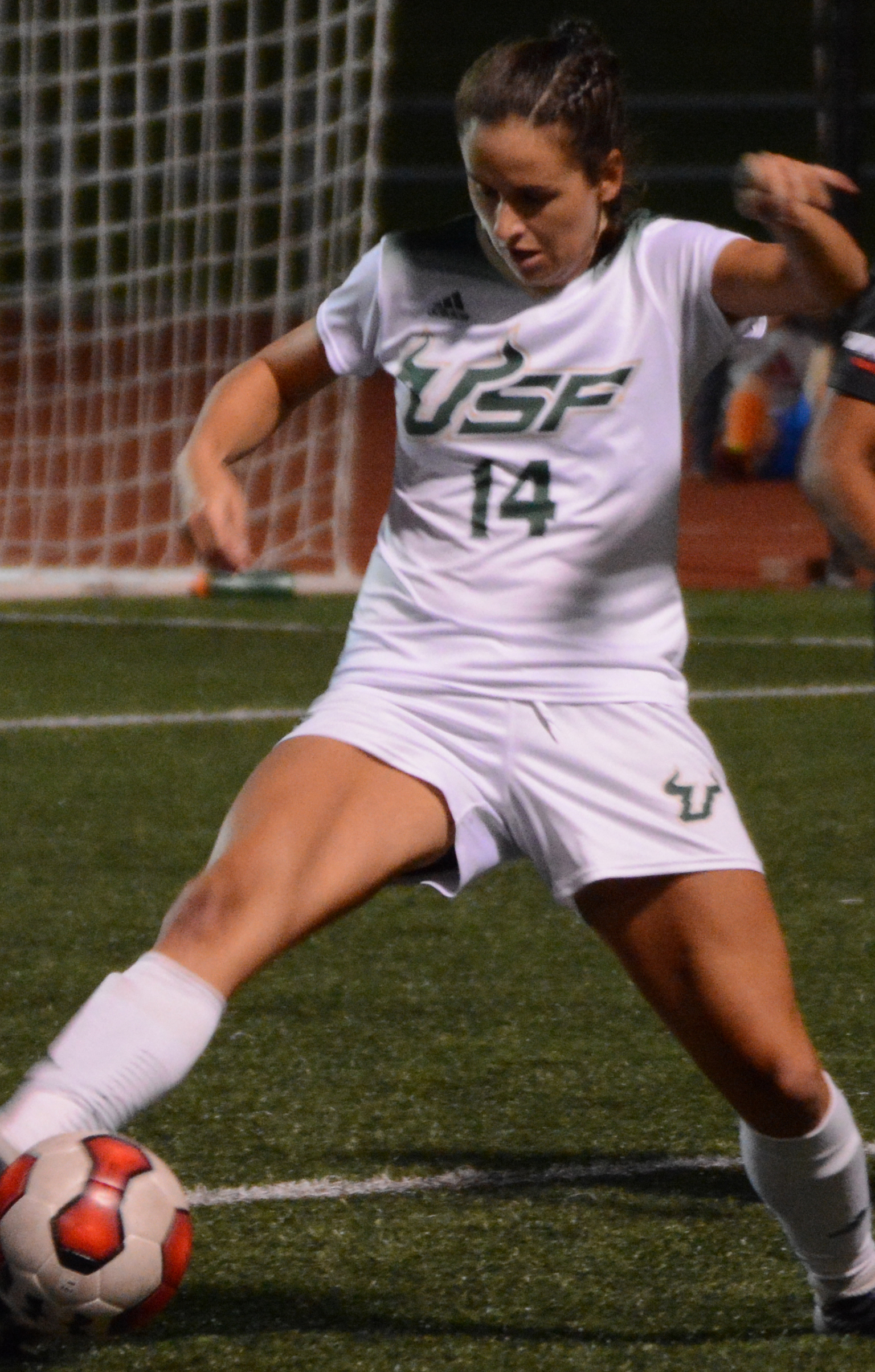
- Evelyne Viens playing for USF. She would later become USF's first Olympic medalist.
  (Austria) Dorothee Deuring – Women's shooting, 1988
- (United States) Kristen Peterson – Women's shooting, 1988, 1992
- (United States) Peter Durben – Men's shooting, 1992
- (Jamaica) Llewelyn Bredwood – Men's track and field, (Note: Bredwood competed in the 4x100 Meter Relay.) 2000
- (Jamaica) Kemel Thompson – Men's track and field, (Note: Thompson competed in the 400 Meter Hurdles.) 2000, 2004
- (Norway) Siri Nordby – Women's soccer, 2008
- (United States) Damu Cherry – Women's track and field, (Note: Cherry competed in the 100 Meter Dash.) 2008
- (Haiti) Dayana Octavien – Women's track and field, (Note: Octavian competed in discus) 2008
- (Trinidad and Tobago) Sasha Springer-Jones – Women's track and field, (Note: Springer-Jones competed in the 100 Meter Dash.) 2008
- (United States) Amanda Evora – Women's figure skating, (Note: USF does not currently and never has sponsored a figure skating program, but Evora is an alumna of the university.) 2010
- (United States) Paige Railey – Women's sailing, 2012, 2016, 2020
- (New Zealand) Olivia Chance – Women's soccer, 2020
- (Chile) Christiane Endler – Women's soccer, 2020
- (United Kingdom) Demi Stokes – Women's soccer, 2020
- (Canada) Evelyne Viens – Women's soccer, 2020, 2024
- (Saint Kitts and Nevis) Zahira Allers-Liburd – Women's track and field, (Note: Allers-Liburd competed in the 100 Meter Dash.) 2024
- (Jamaica) Romaine Beckford – Men's track and field, (Note: Beckford competed in the High Jump.) 2024
- (New Zealand) Katie Kitching – Women's soccer, 2024
- (Belgium) Bethy Mununga – Women's basketball, 2024
- (Ghana) Abdul-Rasheed Saminu – Men's track and field, (Note: Saminu competed in the 100 Meter Dash and 4x100 Meter Relay.) 2024

In 2020, Evelyne Viens became the first USF alum to win an Olympic medal as an athlete in any sport when Canada's women's soccer team won gold. However, multiple USF alumni coached medal winning teams and individuals in the Olympics prior to this, including Ken Eriksen and Ed Baird.

== Rivalries ==
=== War on I-4 ===
USF's main rival is the University of Central Florida Knights, who are located 98 miles northeast in unincorporated Orange County near Orlando. The first meeting between the rivals was a men's basketball game in 1972, where the South Florida Golden Brahmans beat the Florida Tech Knights of the Pegasus 115–96. The close geographic proximity and the schools being founded around the same time (South Florida in 1956 and Central Florida in 1963) made the two naturally become rivals. The Bulls and Knights became conference foes for the first time in 2013, when UCF joined the American Athletic Conference. The rivalry gets its name from Interstate 4, which runs through both Tampa and Orlando.

The rivalry was officially recognized by both USF and UCF on September 21, 2016, when they announced an official trophy series between all 14 sports that both schools sponsor. Each sport is worth six total points, and sports where the teams meet head to head multiple times in the regular season will have the six points divided by the number of games played for a total of 84 possible points with 43 points needed to clinch the trophy. In the event of a tie in the overall competition, the athletic program that scores higher in the annual NCAA Graduation Success Rate will be awarded one extra point and crowned as the champion for that season. In the unlikely event that this is also tied, the series ends as a tie for that season and the previous winner retains the trophy. The competition was put on hold after UCF left the American Conference for the Big 12 Conference in 2023.

The winner each year took possession of a large trophy shaped like an Interstate road sign, which will be displayed on their campus for the following year. One side of the trophy reads "Tampa" and features the USF logo while the other reads "Orlando" and features the UCF logo. The winner of the annual Thanksgiving weekend football clash received a similarly shaped "War On I-4" trophy.

=== Rowdies Cup ===
USF also has a men's soccer derby with the crosstown NCAA Division II member University of Tampa Spartans. The rivalry (known as the Mayor's Cup before 2005) is named after the original Tampa Bay Rowdies who were the first professional sports franchise in Tampa. The winner of the annual exhibition match receives the trophy the now defunct Rowdies won in Soccer Bowl '75. The Bulls lead the all-time series 26–11–3.

The Bulls and Spartans also play occasional exhibition games in other sports, particularly baseball and men's basketball, but not on a regular basis like with men's soccer.

=== Former rivals ===
USF has had several rivals in the past that it no longer plays often. As members of the Sun Belt Conference from 1976 to 1991 their main rivals were Jacksonville and South Alabama and they had a lesser rivalry with Charlotte which continued when both schools joined the Metro Conference in 1991 and Conference USA in 1995. During their time in the Big East, the Bulls had minor rivalries with Louisville, Cincinnati, and West Virginia.

== Traditions ==
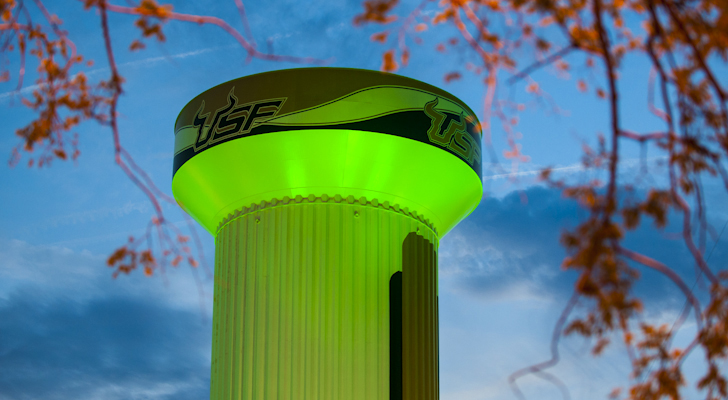
The USF water tower lit up green after a Bulls victory

Since 1995, the university has shined green lights as opposed to the usual white lights on its iconic water tower the night following a victory by any of the Bulls sports teams to let the campus and surrounding area know of the win. The school also lights the water tower green for special events like homecoming week and commencement ceremonies.

USF's fight song is the Golden Brahman March, named after the original mascot. USF is somewhat unique among colleges in that it has both a fight song and a victory song, March Victorious. The Golden Brahman March is played at the end of every Bulls home game along with USF's Alma Mater, but March Victorious is only played at the end of games that USF wins.

USF's hand sign is "Horns Up", similar to Texas's "Hook 'em Horns". The signal is used as good luck during field goals, extra points, free throws, and as general school spirit.

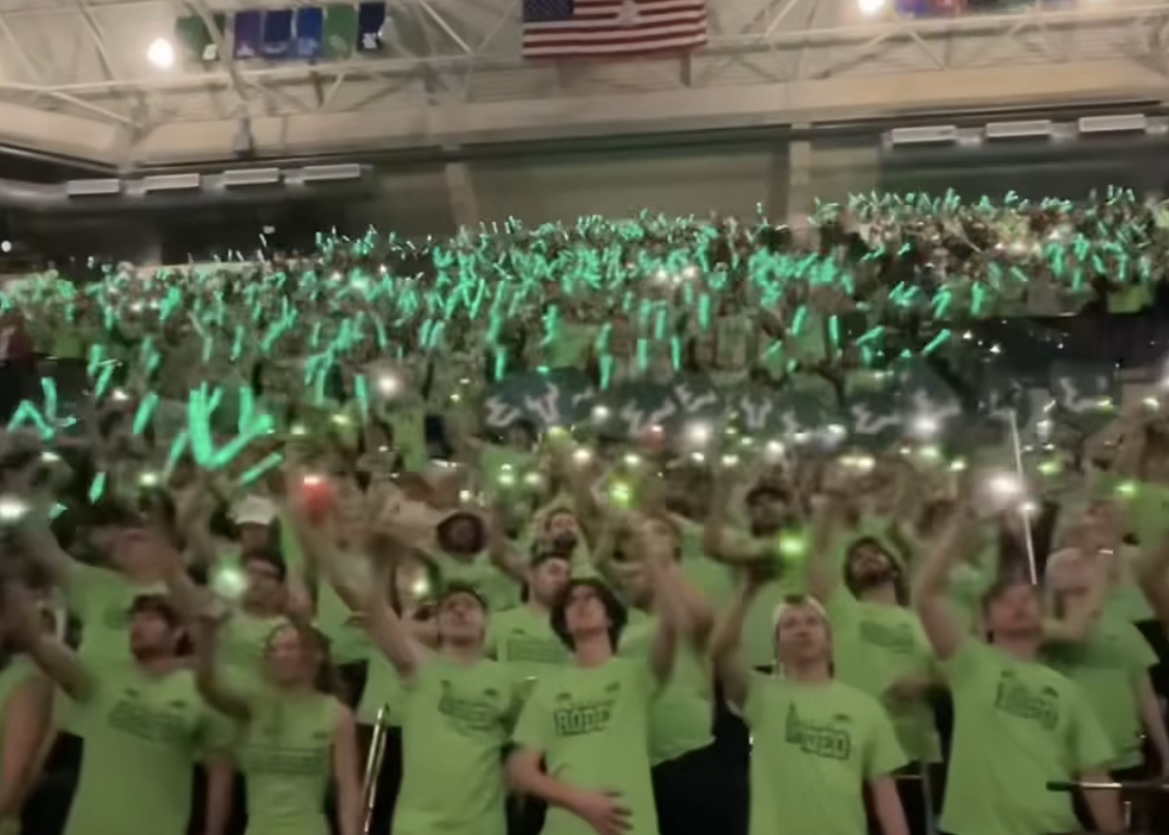
So Flo Rodeo at a USF basketball game

The student sections for Bulls home games are known collectively as the So Flo Rodeo. The front rows for football and a select men's and women's basketball games are reserved for a group of students called the Beef Studs who paint themselves green and gold for the games.

A newer tradition for USF teams is the addition of "Slime Green" alternate jerseys for games against rival UCF, which utilize a much brighter neon green and yellow compared to the Bulls usual dark green and gold. This tradition began with a men's basketball game in 2020 and has since spread to all other sports in the War on I-4.

== Media ==
In 2017, USF became the second university in the nation to have its own 24-hour digital radio station after launching the Bulls Unlimited channel on TuneIn. Bulls Unlimited and its sister station Bulls Unlimited 2 carry live game coverage of most sports, highlights, shows, and historical game replays and are available for free worldwide.

Under the current American Conference TV deal beginning in 2019, all home games and in-conference away games in baseball, men's and women's basketball, football, lacrosse, men's and women's soccer, softball, men's and women's tennis, and volleyball are shown on one of the various ESPN networks or streamed live on ESPN+. Beach volleyball games are also available on ESPN+ through Conference USA's media rights deal. Football, men's basketball, and some women's basketball radio broadcasts can be heard in the Tampa Bay area and Southwest Florida on flagship station WRBQ 104.7 FM. Additionally, Spanish-language radio broadcasts for football games can be heard on WYUU 106.9 FM. These radio broadcasts are also available on Bulls Unlimited worldwide.

USF receives about $7 million annually through the conference TV deal, which runs until the 2031–32 season.

== Facilities ==
The USF Athletic District is the home for every USF varsity sport besides sailing and is located on the east side of campus, primarily along Bull Run Drive and Genshaft Drive. The district includes the Lee Roy Selmon Athletic Center (the athletic department's headquarters), Corbett Stadium (lacrosse and soccer), the Frank Morsani Football Practice Complex, the Pam & Les Muma Basketball Practice Center, the Yuengling Center (basketball), The Claw (golf), the USF Baseball Stadium, the USF Softball Stadium, the USF Track and Field Stadium, The Corral (volleyball), and the USF Varsity Tennis Courts.

=== Lee Roy Selmon Athletic Center ===
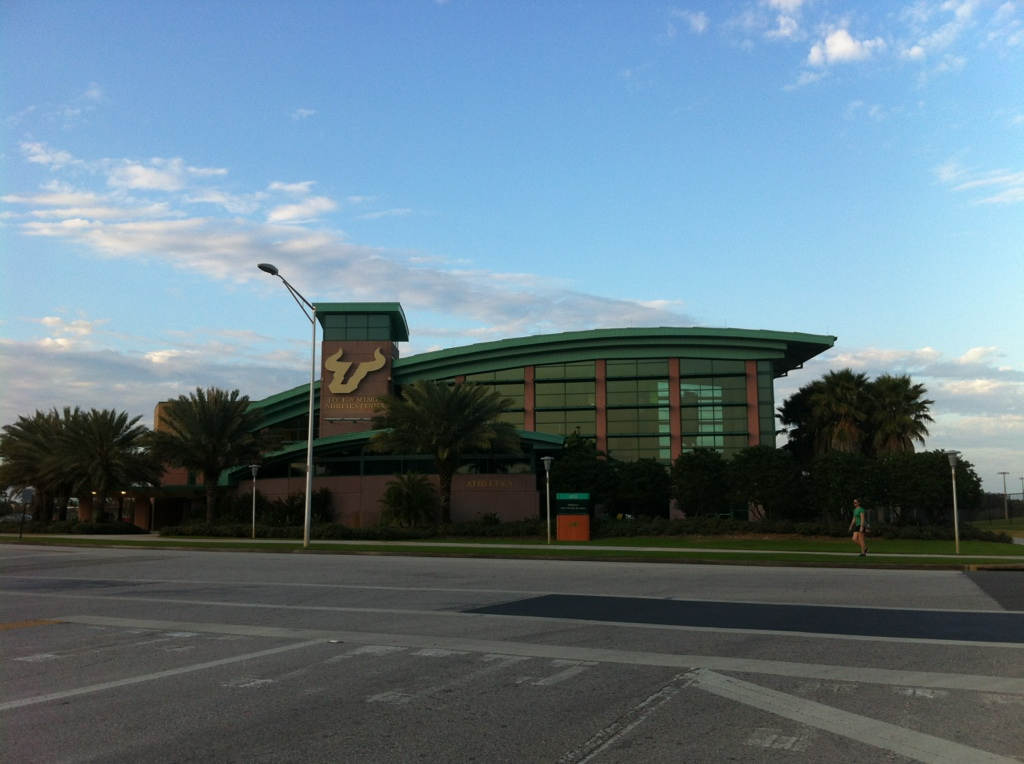
Lee Roy Selmon Athletic Center.

Opened in 2004, the Lee Roy Selmon Athletic Center is the main hub for USF Athletics. In 2012, the facility was dedicated to the late Lee Roy Selmon, a Pro Football Hall of Fame member and former director of USF athletics. Selmon is considered by many to be the "Father of USF Football". The 104,000 square foot facility houses all USF sports teams except for men's and women's basketball, sailing, and volleyball. The building features a large strength and conditioning center, a sports medicine clinic, the USF Athletic Hall of Fame, and an Academic Enrichment Center complete with a computer study lab, a library, study lounges, and academic counseling.

=== Yuengling Center ===
Formerly known as the USF Sun Dome, the Yuengling Center on the Tampa campus is the home facility of the men's and women's basketball teams and the women's volleyball team. The first event held in the facility was a basketball game in 1980. Since the opening of the arena, it has been the site for USF commencement ceremonies, orientation sessions, and other major university and community events. The venue is also one of the top concert spots in the Tampa Bay region, having hosted musicians like Elton John, Florence and the Machine, Frank Sinatra, Heart, Sting, and more. The arena became LEED Silver certified in 2014.

=== Raymond James Stadium ===
The USF football team plays at Raymond James Stadium, home to the NFL's Tampa Bay Buccaneers. USF is one of only five FBS teams to play their home games in a current NFL stadium (the others being Miami, Temple, Pitt, and UNLV). Raymond James Stadium is located 13 miles away from the Tampa campus. The stadium has a capacity of more than 75,000 fans including a 12,000 seat student section in the north end zone, making it the largest stadium and largest student section in the American Conference when at full capacity, but seating for most games is limited to the 100 and 200 levels which brings the capacity down to around 45,000.

On April 29, 2025, the University of South Florida Board of Trustees approved an updated stadium budget totaling $348.5 million, revising earlier plans in order to include enhancements such as expanded academic spaces, locker room upgrades, and future expansion readiness. Groundbreaking for USF's first on-campus football stadium took place in late 2023, with new clearance efforts initiating in May 2025. The facility is slated to host its first games in fall 2027.

== Spirit ==
=== Herd of Thunder ===
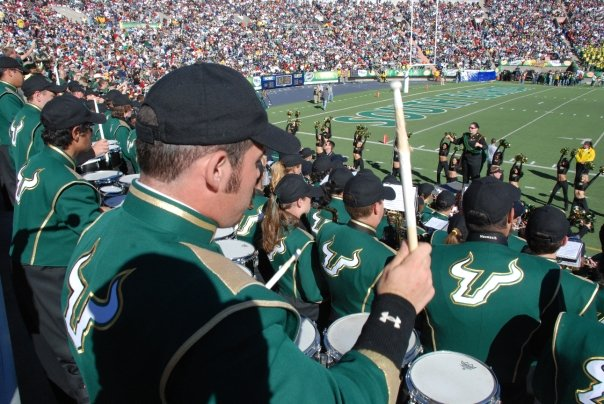
Herd of Thunder at the 2007 Sun Bowl.

The Herd of Thunder, often called HOT or the Pride of the Bay, is the marching band of the South Florida Bulls. It was founded in 1998 and first performed in 1999, two years after USF fielded its first football team. The pep band, Rumble, has existed since the 1970s and plays at all men's and women's basketball games plus some soccer and volleyball games.

The Herd of Thunder's Winter Guard consistently places in the top of the annual Winter Guard International World Championships, taking home the silver medal in the Independent Open category in 2012 and the bronze medal in the Independent A category in 2006.

=== Rocky the Bull ===
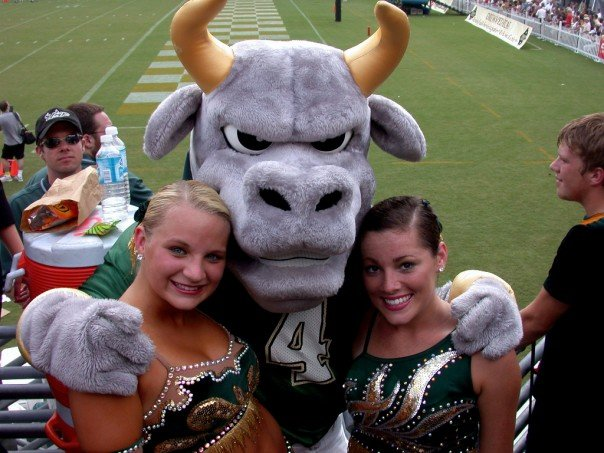
Rocky the Bull with some USF cheerleaders

USF's mascot is Rocky the Bull (also spelled Rocky D. Bull), an anthropomorphic bull who dresses in USF gear. Rocky is seen at every USF home game and meet for all sports and wears the jersey of whatever sport is being played.

Rocky won the Capital One Mascot Challenge in 2013, being voted as the best college mascot in the country. The win earned USF $20,000 toward the mascot program.

=== Cheerleading and Dance ===
The USF cheerleading program consists of two teams: a competitive co-ed team and a competitive all-girl squad, which compete at the Universal Cheerleaders Association College Nationals and perform at USF sporting events. Both the all-girl squad and co-ed team continually rank among the top competitive college squads in the nation. The co-ed team has won four UCA Division I-A national championships (including three consecutive) in 2021, 2022 and 2023, and 2026 and gameday in 2025. The all-girl squad won the national championship for the gameday event in 2023, 2024, and 2026, the Division I-A title in 2024, the 2025 USA Grand Championship, and the 2025 All-Girl World Cup. USF is one of only three schools which have won Division I-A championships in both the co-ed and all-girl categories and the only school to win all-girl championships for gameday and traditional in the same year.

The USF Sun Dolls are an all-girl dance team that perform at all home USF football and basketball games, in addition to competing in the annual Universal Dance Association College Nationals.

== Notable non-varsity sports ==
USF offers over 40 different club sports to students, which compete against club teams from other universities. With the exception of the all-girl and co-ed cheerleading squads, all club sports are funded through USF's Student Government Association rather than the athletic department. Some of the most notable club sports include:

=== Cricket ===
USF's Twenty20 cricket club team immediately found great success after being established in 2009. Between their inaugural year and 2016, the Bulls made seven American College Cricket semifinals and five national championship games, capped off by winning national championships in 2014 and 2016. The Bulls returned to the ACC semifinals in 2017 and 2018 as well. Beginning in 2019, they moved from American College Cricket to the National Collegiate Cricket Association.

=== Flag football ===
USF has both a Men's and Women's Flag Football Club, both of which compete in the National Intramural and Recreational Sports Association. The men's team won the NIRSA National Championship in 1994 and 2001.

=== Ice hockey ===
The Ice Bulls club team were founded in 1989 and play in the Southern Collegiate Hockey Conference of the College Hockey Federation. They have made Nationals of their previous league, the American Collegiate Hockey Association, five times, and most recently won the SCHC championship in 2020 to qualify for Nationals for a sixth time, but the ACHA canceled the National Tournament due to the COVID-19 pandemic. The Ice Bulls play their home games at AdventHealth Center Ice in Wesley Chapel, Florida and all home games are free to the public.

=== Karate ===
The USF co-ed karate club team competes in the National Collegiate Karate Association. They won NCKA National Championships in 1994 and 1995.

=== Lacrosse ===
USF offers lacrosse teams for both men and women. The men's team was originally founded in 1971 and re-founded in 2000 after being defunct for most of the 1990s. The early teams were poorly equipped until coach Bronson Thayer convinced New York Yankees owner and Tampa resident George Steinbrenner to help fund the team. The team has won three state championships: 1978 (after a perfect season), 1984, and 1989. Today the team plays in the SouthEastern Lacrosse Conference in the Men's Collegiate Lacrosse Association.

The women's lacrosse team competes in the Southeastern Women's Lacrosse League.

=== Paintball ===
Paintball is one of the most popular club teams at USF. They compete as a co-ed team in the National Collegiate Paintball Association. They have won two NCPA national championships: 2017 and 2018.

=== Rugby ===
The USF men's rugby club was founded in 1969. USF plays rugby in the South Independent Conference against local rivals such as Central Florida and Florida State. The Bulls were the USA Rugby South champions and national semifinalists in 2009 and 2011, respectively.

USF also has a women's rugby club, which was established in 1992 and plays in the Florida Rugby Union.

=== Wakeboarding ===
The co-ed USF Wakeboarding Club competes in the American Wakeboard Association, a division of USA Water Ski. They won the 2011 AWA National Championship.

=== Club team national championships ===
Non-varsity club teams, which are not sponsored by the USF Athletic Department (other than the cheer team), have won 19 national championships and one world championship.

Year	Sport	League
1994	Men's flag football	National Intramural and Recreational Sports Association
1994	Karate	National Collegiate Karate Association
1995	Karate	National Collegiate Karate Association
2001	Men's flag football	National Intramural and Recreational Sports Association
2011	Wakeboarding	American Wakeboard Association
2014	Cricket	American College Cricket
2016	Cricket	American College Cricket
2017	Paintball	National Collegiate Paintball Association
2018	Paintball	National Collegiate Paintball Association
2021	Co-ed cheer	Universal Cheerleaders Association
2022	Co-ed cheer	Universal Cheerleaders Association
2023	Co-ed cheer	Universal Cheerleaders Association
2023	All-girl cheer (gameday)	Universal Cheerleaders Association
2024	All-girl cheer (gameday)	Universal Cheerleaders Association
2024	All-girl cheer	Universal Cheerleaders Association
2025	Co-ed cheer (gameday)	Universal Cheerleaders Association
2025	All-girl cheer (USA Grand Championship)	Universal Cheerleaders Association
2025	All-girl cheer (World Cup)	Universal Cheerleaders Association
2026	Co-ed cheer	Universal Cheerleaders Association
2026	All-girl cheer (gameday)	Universal Cheerleaders Association

== See also ==
- University of South Florida
- American Conference
- Sports in the Tampa Bay area
