= South Florida Bulls lacrosse =

- Founded: 2025
- University: University of South Florida
- Athletic director: Michael Kelly
- Head coach: Mindy McCord (1st season)
- Stadium: Corbett Stadium (capacity: 4,000)
- Location: Tampa, Florida
- Conference: American Conference
- Nickname: Bulls
- Colors: Green and gold

Conference regular season championships
- 2026

The South Florida Bulls lacrosse team began representing the University of South Florida in women's lacrosse for the spring 2025 season, competing in the American Conference of NCAA Division I and playing home games at Corbett Stadium on USF's Tampa campus (which they share with the USF men's and women's soccer teams). It is the university's newest varsity sports team and the first new USF team since football was established in 1997, as well as the first new women's team in an NCAA sport at USF since women's soccer in 1995 (USF's women's sailing team was established in 1997, but it competes in the Inter-Collegiate Sailing Association rather than the NCAA).

The team is coached by Mindy McCord.

== History ==
The USF women's lacrosse team was first announced in November 2021 and will become the university's 20th varsity sports team. In May 2022, athletic director Michael Kelly announced that former Jacksonville Dolphins head coach Mindy McCord would be the first head coach of the program. The team played their first exhibition match in October 2023.

They were originally scheduled to take the field for the first time in spring 2024, but this date was later pushed back to spring 2025. Their first home field will be the on-campus Corbett Stadium which was built in 2011 as the new home for the Bulls soccer teams. This will be a temporary arrangement until USF's new on-campus football stadium opens in 2027.

The team won their first regular season conference title in 2026, their second-ever season.

== See also ==
South Florida Bulls
