= South Florida Bulls beach volleyball =

American college volleyball team

- Founded: 2026
- University: University of South Florida
- Athletic director: Rob Higgins
- Head coach: Jo Kremer (1st season)
- Conference: CUSA
- Location: Tampa, Florida, US
- Nickname: Bulls

The South Florida Bulls beach volleyball team will represent the University of South Florida in the sport of women's beach volleyball at the NCAA National Collegiate level (Note: "National Collegiate" means that NCAA Division I, NCAA Division II, and NCAA Division III schools all compete against each other directly instead of being separated into divisions. USF is a member of Division I for all other NCAA sports.) beginning in spring 2026. In May 2026, Jo Kremer was named the 2nd head coach for the program for the 2027 season.

Because the Bulls main conference, the American Conference, does not sponsor the sport of beach volleyball, the team will play as members of Conference USA. The Bulls will play their home games on campus, with a new six court facility built in the schools athletic district starting in the 2027 season.

== History ==
The team was first announced in February 2022 and will become the university's 21st varsity sports team (and 12th women's team) when they begin play in spring 2026. The team was originally scheduled to start in 2025 but was postponed to 2026 in June 2023. At the time of the team's founding, beach volleyball was the newest NCAA sport and was sponsored by 86 teams across the NCAA's three divisions. NCAA beach volleyball championships are competed at the National Collegiate level rather than division levels like most NCAA sports, meaning that Division I, II, and III schools all compete directly against each other.

Pri Piantadosi-Lima was hired as the first head coach on June 6, 2023. She previously helped lead Eckerd College to an AVCA National Championship as an assistant coach.

On November 5, 2024, USF athletic director Michael Kelly announced that the team would play as members of Conference USA.

On May 30th, 2026, USF CEO of Athletics Rob Higgins announced Jo Kremer would become the 2nd head coach for the team.

== See also ==
- South Florida Bulls
- South Florida Bulls volleyball
