= WBUL =

WBUL may refer to:

- WBUL (AM), a former college radio station (1620 AM) located in Tampa, Florida, United States, now Bulls Media
- WBUL-FM, a radio station (98.1 FM) licensed to Lexington, Kentucky, United States
