= South Florida Bulls tennis =

- Founded: 1966; 59 years ago
- University: University of South Florida
- Athletic director: Michael Kelly
- Head coach: Men: Ashley Fisher; Women: Cristina Moros
- Conference: The American
- Location: Tampa, FL
- Home Court: USF Varsity Tennis Courts
- Nickname: Bulls
- Colors: Green and gold

NCAA Tournament appearances
- Men: 1974, 1995, 1996, 1998, 1999, 2001, 2002, 2003, 2008, 2009, 2014, 2015, 2016, 2017, 2019, 2021, 2022, 2025; Women: 1969*, 1970*, 1971*, 1976*, 1977^{†}, 1978^{†}, 1979^{†}, 1984, 1997, 1998, 1999, 2000, 2006, 2007, 2008, 2010, 2011, 2014, 2017 *: USLTA Tournament^{†}: AIAW Tournament

Conference Tournament championships
- Men: 1977, 1978, 1979, 1980, 1985, 1986, 1987, 1988, 1990, 1995, 1996, 1998, 1999, 2002, 2009, 2014, 2015, 2016, 2017, 2019; Women: 1984, 1985, 1986, 1991, 1992, 1993, 1994, 1995, 1997, 2002, 2007, 2014, 2017

The South Florida Bulls tennis program represents the University of South Florida in the sport of tennis. The program consists of separate men's and women's teams and competes in the American Conference within NCAA Division I. The Bulls men's tennis team is coached by Ashley Fisher and the women's team is coached by Cristina Moros. Both teams play their home matches at the USF Varsity Tennis Courts on USF's campus in Tampa, Florida.

== Men ==
The Bulls men's tennis team was founded in 1966 as one of the seven original varsity sports to be offered at USF, beginning as an NCAA Division II program. The team did not see much success in Division II, but made it to the NCAA Division I Men's Tennis Championship in 1974—their first season in Division I. Upon joining the Sun Belt Conference in the 1976–77 season, the Bulls won each of the first four conference championships. However, the Bulls did not qualify for the NCAA Tournament again until 1995. They have won 20 total conference championships, the second most of any USF team behind only men's soccer. They have also qualified for 18 NCAA Tournaments, with their best performance coming in 2015 when they made it to the Round of 16.

== Women ==
USF's women's tennis team was also founded in 1966, making it the oldest women's team at the school. The NCAA did not sponsor women's sports until 1982–83, where the Lady Brahmans were known for the first time to compete in the United States Lawn Tennis Association. They qualified for nationals in the USLTA four times and finished third in the nation in 1970 and 1971. They started to join the Association for Intercollegiate Athletics for Women in 1977. They reached the national tournament in the AIAW three times, with their highest finish being 11th place. In 1984, they won their first ever conference championship, though they had competed without a conference affiliation until the 1983 season. They also qualified for the NCAA Division I Women's Tennis Championship for the first time in the 1984 season. As of 2020, the Bulls women's tennis team has won 13 conference titles, the second most number of wins in any women's team at the school. In addition, they have also qualified for 12 NCAA Tournaments, though they have only reached as far as the second round in the NCAA, and have done so three times.

== See also ==
- University of South Florida
- South Florida Bulls
