= South Florida Bulls sailing =

- Founded: 1997
- University: University of South Florida
- Athletic director: Michael Kelly
- Head coach: Allison Jolly (17th season)
- Conference: SAISA
- Location: St. Petersburg, Florida, US
- Venue: Haney Landing Sailing Center
- Nickname: Bulls
- Colors: Green and Gold

National championships
- Match Racing: 2009; Offshore Large Boats: 2016, 2017

Conference championships
- 1998, 2002, 2003, 2004, 2006, 2008, 2009, 2011, 2012, 2014, 2015, 2023, 2025

The South Florida Bulls sailing team represents the University of South Florida in the sport of sailing. The team competes in the South Atlantic Intercollegiate Sailing Association within the Inter-Collegiate Sailing Association. The Bulls are coached by Allison Jolly, a member of the National Sailing Hall of Fame and gold medalist in the first Olympic women's sailing event at the 1988 Summer Olympics in Seoul. She has coached the team since 2004. The team's home venue is within Tampa Bay, at the Donald A. Haney Landing Sailing Center on the University of South Florida St. Petersburg campus. It is the university's only varsity sport based on the St. Petersburg campus.

The sailing program has won three ICSA National Championships: Sloop in 2009 and Offshore Large Boats in 2016 and 2017. Their three national championships are the most of any USF team. In addition to these, the Bulls have won 13 conference championships.

== History ==
Like many varsity sailing teams across the nation, the USF sailing team began as a club team at the USF St. Petersburg campus. The club team was born in 1993, with USF St. Petersburg College of Education professor Dr. W. Steve Lang serving as the head coach. The team achieved varsity status in fall 1997, with Lang remaining as the head coach. They won their conference title and qualified for the Intercollegiate Yacht Racing Association (now Inter-Collegiate Sailing Association) Team Racing National Championship during their first year of existence, and finished as the 11th-best team in the country. They returned to the National Championships in the following season as well. Lang resigned as coach in 2000 to focus on his work as a professor at the university. As of 2022, Lang still teaches at USF.

Stephanie Doyle replaced Steve Lang as head coach in 2000. The Bulls won conference titles in 2002, 2003, and 2004 under her leadership.

After Doyle's departure in 2004, USF hired Olympic gold medalist and St. Petersburg native Allison Jolly as the third coach in program history. Jolly has led the Bulls to three national championships (sloop in 2009 and offshore large boats in 2016 and 2017), two national runner-up finishes (singlehanded in 2009 and 2011), eight conference championships, 14 appearances in ICSA nationals, and two appearances representing the United States in the Student Yachting World Cup.

== Honors ==
=== National championships ===
USF has won three sailing national titles:

Year	Competition
2009	Sloop
2016	Offshore Large Boats
2017	Offshore Large Boats

=== National runners-up ===
The Bulls have finished as national runners-up twice:

Year	Competition
2009	Singlehanded
2011	Singlehanded
