= Dick Bowers =

American athletic director (1930–2007)

Biographical details
- Born: August 9, 1930
- Died: November 29, 2007 (aged 77)
- Education: University of Tennessee

Administrative career (AD unless noted)
- 1964–1982: South Florida

Richard T. "Dick" Bowers (August 9, 1930 - November 29, 2007) was an American college athletics administrator. He was the first athletic director at the University of South Florida (USF) from 1966 to 1982.

== Early life and college ==
Bowers was born in Nashville, Tennessee on August 9, 1930. He attended the University of Tennessee, where he played basketball for the Volunteers from 1949 to 1952. He served as a captain in the United States Army during the Korean War after earning his bachelor's degree in physical education from UT, and then returned to the school for a master's degree in education administration. Bowers later received a PhD in physical education from Vanderbilt University.

== Career as a professor ==
After receiving his PhD Bowers taught at King University (known as King College at the time), where he met his wife, Madge, who was also a professor at the school. He and his wife were Fulbright Lecturers at Myanmar's University of Yangon. Bowers later taught at Shepherd University in West Virginia and Central Connecticut State University, before taking a job to teach at the University of South Florida in 1963.

== As athletic director ==
Though he was originally only hired to be a physical education professor, USF president John Allen asked Bowers to become the university's first-ever athletic director in 1964. During his tenure as athletic director which lasted until 1982, Bowers helped to establish the Sun Belt Conference, USF added 13 intercollegiate sports programs and built several facilities including the USF Sun Dome, Red McEwen Field, and a university golf course. Bowers helped put USF on the map by hiring big-name coaches including Robin Roberts for USF's baseball team and Lee Rose for USF's men's basketball team.

== Later career ==
From 1983 to 1992, Bowers was a director at the USF College of Business Administration, and he served as an associate dean and professor for the program from 1992 until 2003. He also served as Director of Development at Tampa's Museum of Science & Industry, as well as in leadership roles for numerous local charities. Bowers died at 77 years old of an aneurysm on November 29, 2007. He was posthumously inducted into the inaugural class of the University of South Florida Athletic Hall of Fame in 2009.

== Personal life ==
Bowers and his wife Madge had two children: Rick Jr. and Delisa. Bowers was the father-in-law of pro-wrestler Mike Awesome.

== See also ==
- South Florida Bulls
