= American College Cricket =

American collegiate organization for promoting cricket

American College Cricket was a national collegiate organization that had developed and governed cricket in American (and some Canadian) universities. The mission of the organization was to develop cricket in colleges in the United States and Canada. Since being founded in 2008 the organization had grown to include over 90 member colleges. Each year a national championship was held in Florida, primarily at the CBRP Cricket Stadium, during spring break. Aside from the main tournament, regional tournaments were held as well as a league between colleges.

As part of its mission to develop cricket in America, American College Cricket made the first broadcast of Cricket in the United States via web streaming in March 2010. From October 2011, American College Cricket has broadcast its matches through TV Asia across the USA & Canada.

At the end of each season, a set of awards were given out. These include The Bart King Award (the best one or two students who have played cricket having mainly played another sport and not having any previous experience), Newcomer of the Year and Player of the Year.& College Players of the Year.

== History ==
The organization was founded in November 2008 by Lloyd Jodah, who was also the president.

In December 2008 Wisden and ICC Cricketer of the Year Shiv Chanderpaul both endorsed the organization, with the National Championship Trophy named the Shiv Chanderpaul Trophy.

In March 2009 the first national championship was held, involving 5 newly formed teams from University of Miami, University of South Florida, Montgomery College, Boston University and Carnegie Mellon. Montgomery College won the first championship. The championship received extensive media coverage within the United States, notably through being featured in The New York Times, front page of The Washington Post and in media in India.

In the Fall of 2010 the organization began Regional Championships in the Mid West, North East, Mid Atlantic, South East, West Coast and South West. These have become annual events during the Fall and now include an Ivy League Championship.

In 2010 American College Cricket, and specifically the 2009 National Champion Montgomery College, was a Front Page Story in the Sunday Washington Post. Many more mainstream media coverage followed including the NY Daily News, the LA Daily News, NY Times (a second time), Sun Sentinel and more.

From Oct 2011 American College Cricket broadcast the first cricket in USA on TV, with TV Asia, together they did 39 matches over the next two and half years. Coca-Cola was a sponsor, marking the 1st time a major American corp sponsored any domestic cricket. The March 2014 Nationals Final was carried Live on ESPN, again marking the first time ESPN broadcast any American cricket, and it was also the first time the sports channel broadcast a non-international match.

In 2011 American College Cricket President Lloyd Jodah was invited to the National Baseball Hall of Fame to participate in the ribbon cutting to open the Exhibition "Swinging Away - How Cricket & Baseball Connect" in April. In June Jodah returned with 4 American College Cricket players to do cricket demonstration on the lawns of the Hall.

In 2016/2017 Sony broadcast 15 American College Cricket games, including the Semis and Finals of March 2017, and the legendary Shiv Chanderpaul presented the Chanderpaul Trophy and other Awards.

=== Yearly results ===
Year	Champions	Runners-up
2009	Montgomery	South Florida
2010	York (ON)	Virginia Tech
2011	George Mason	Montgomery
2012	York (NY)	South Florida
2013	UMBC	South Florida
2014	South Florida	Auburn
2015	UT Dallas	Drexel
2016	South Florida	Rutgers
2017	Ryerson	Virginia Tech
2018	Virginia Tech	MIT
2019	West Virginia	NJIT
2020	West Virginia	Arkansas State
2021	Canceled due to COVID-19	
2022	West Virginia	Florida
2023	Pittsburgh	Florida

== See also ==
- Major League Cricket
- Minor League Cricket
- 2021 Minor League Cricket season
