= Southern Collegiate Hockey Conference =

- Conference: CHF
- Founded: 2014
- Sports fielded: Men's ice hockey
- Division: Division II
- No. of teams: 5
- Region: Florida
- Most recent champions: University of Tampa (2nd title)
- Most titles: Florida Gulf Coast Eagles (4 titles)
- Website: Official website

The Southern Collegiate Hockey Conference is a collegiate hockey conference within Division II of the College Hockey Federation. All teams within the conference come from universities based in the state of Florida.

== History ==
The SCHC began play in the 2014–15 season. For the first two seasons, the conference was composed of five teams from Florida. Prior to the start of the 2016–17 season, the conference added the University of Miami as the sixth member of the conference. The 2016–17 season has each of the six member schools playing each other twice during the regular season. In 2018–2019 the conference added Embry-Riddle Aeronautical University as its sixth member after Florida Atlantic University left the conference. In 2020 the SCHC announced its plan to affiliate with the College Hockey Federation in 2020-2021. As a result Florida Gulf Coast University announced its departure from the conference to stay in the American Collegiate Hockey Association.

== Members ==
School	Location	Founded	Joined	Nickname	Colors	Home arena	Website
Embry–Riddle Aeronautical University	Daytona Beach, Florida	1926	2018	Eagles		Daytona Ice Arena	
University of Central Florida	Orlando, Florida	1963	2014	Knights		Orlando Ice Den	
University of Miami	Coral Gables, Florida	1925	2016	Hurricanes		Pines Ice Arena	
University of South Florida	Tampa, Florida	1956	2014	Bulls		Florida Hospital Center Ice	
University of Tampa	Tampa, Florida	1931	2014	Spartans		Clearwater Ice Arena	

== Former members ==
School	Location	Founded	Joined	Left	Current conference	Nickname	Colors	Home arena	Website
Florida Atlantic University	Boca Raton, Florida	1961	2014	2018	SECHC	Owls		Florida Panthers IceDen	
Florida Gulf Coast University	Estero, Florida	1991	2014	2020	Independent	Eagles		Germain Arena	

== Conference champions ==
Year	Champion	Runner-up	Score	Host
2015	Florida Gulf Coast	Central Florida	3-1	Florida Gulf Coast
2016	Florida Gulf Coast	Tampa	3-1	Tampa
2017	Tampa	South Florida	6-3	South Florida
2018	Florida Gulf Coast	South Florida	3-2	Owls
2019	Florida Gulf Coast	South Florida	4-3	South Florida
2020	South Florida	Tampa	3-1	Knights
2021	Cancelled due to COVID-19 Pandemic			
2022	Tampa	South Florida	6-4	South Florida
