= University of South Florida Herd of Thunder =

Collegiate athletic bands program

Herd of Thunder
- Nickname: HOT, Pride of the Bay
- School: University of South Florida
- Location: Tampa, Florida
- Conference: The American
- Founded: 1999
- Director: Dr. Trevor A. Butts
- Assistant Director: Devin C. Dedon
- Members: 351
- Fight song: "Golden Brahman March"
- Website: herdofthunder.com

The Herd of Thunder (often called H.O.T. or the Pride of the Bay) is the name for the athletic bands of the University of South Florida, which includes the show band, "Rumble" pep band, and marching band ensembles, although it is often used to refer simply to the Marching Band. The Herd of Thunder was founded in 1999, two years after USF fielded its first football team.

== History ==
The Herd of Thunder (H.O.T.) Marching Band at The University of South Florida first took the field in September 1999. With the addition of a football team in 1997, the marching band was a needed faction of USF and was implemented by then University President, Betty Castor. With the help of the Athletic Department, the USF Alumni Association, and the USF School of Music, the Herd of Thunder was born.

=== The first year ===
During the first year, the H.O.T. Marching Band was very eager to start traditions and try new things. Even though there had already been a USF Pep Band for decades (in basketball), since 1968, an undertaking of this magnitude was very different. Three hundred uniforms were ordered and many new instruments were purchased. At the first day of Marching Band Camp, 140 students were in attendance, under the direction of Dr. Sid Haton. With their instruments, these students were prepared to learn the first drill sets of the USF Pre-game show. A Field Guard of 24 members rounded out the band. New members continued to join the H.O.T. every day, during this important growth period for the band. That first year began the tradition of the "Call" and “Running of the Bulls”, where the band ran from the tunnels of the stadium, "stampeding" onto the football field. By their first game, the H.O.T. had grown to over 200 members. Starting another tradition, their first show featured a Latin theme, including "La Copa de La Vida". Ironically, the sky thundered during the debut of the Herd of Thunder and the marching band was unable to march. However, the rain couldn't stop them, as they still performed from the stands.

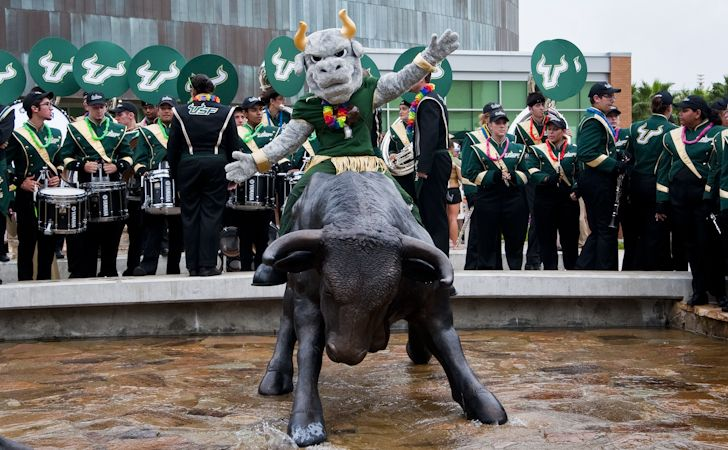
HOT with Rocky the Bull

=== Directors of The Herd of Thunder ===
- 1999-2002 Dr. Donald Sidney Haton (1963-2008)
- 2002-2008 Dr. Michael C. Robinson
- 2008-2009 John Schnettler (Interim)
- 2009–2018 Dr. Matthew McCluckin
- 2018–2022 Dr. Marc Sosnowchik
- 2022–Present Dr. Trevor A. Butts

== Traditions ==
The Herd of Thunder has established many traditions over the years, contributing to the university community and the Tampa Bay area. The "Call of the Bulls," is an iconic story among the trumpet section (Formerly known as the "Scream Team,") and band members, due to the members never forget running onto the field for the first time with the loud roars of the home crowd cheering them on. The Road Show and Post-game parade have also been staples in H.O.T.'s traditions.

=== The Bull ===
In 1999, HOT band member Keith Sanz was studying at the USF School of Music. He composed a short piece that the Marching Band uses to inspire spirit. This notable tune is "The Bull" chant. The band plays this on offensive 3rd downs or whenever the defense needs to make a stop. "The Bull" became a favorite of USF Bulls fans, who wave their Bulls hands in the air whenever this song is played.

=== South Florida school songs ===
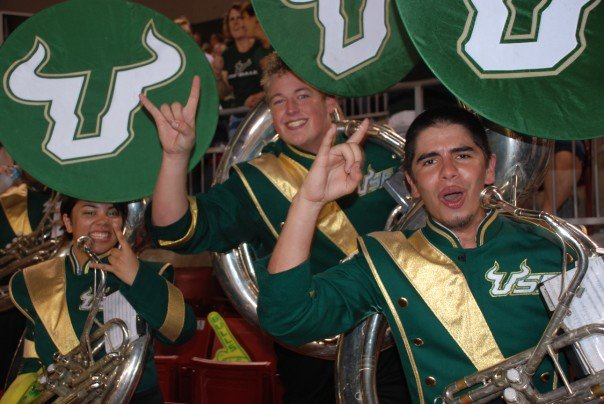
HOT sousaphones giving the "Go Bulls" hand sign

The Herd of Thunder performs several school spirit songs, including the Golden Brahman March (USF fight song), Alma Mater, "The Bull", March Victorious and Aleksso's Cadence.

== Pregame ==
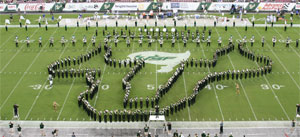
Herd of Thunder performing "The Bull" during Pre-game.

The University of South Florida pregame festivities begin with the Herd of Thunder luring tailgaters to the stadium with their parking lot concert ("Road Show"), where they play the Golden Brahman March, March Victorious, The Bull, and other tunes to pump up the last of the tailgaters. 15 minutes before game-time, the HOT band perform the "Call of the Bulls Fanfare", which begins the USF on-field pregame tradition.

The drumline begins the cadence to signal the entire band, cheerleaders, and Rocky the Bull to come "stampeding" onto the field. This format gives the illusion of a small and modest performance before filling the field with USF pride and "blowing away" the audience each time. Right after the "Call of the Bulls Fanfare", The Herd of Thunder then performs their version of "El Toro Caliente", March Victorious, the USF Alma Mater, and the Golden Brahman March (USF Fight Song), before leading the stadium in the National Anthem. HOT then forms the "iconic U" and precedes to play "The Bull" which they play to each side of the stadium to begin the football team's stampede. After forming a tunnel in front of the entrance to the field, HOT performs a drum cadence, until the team comes running out, they then cut directly into the Fight Song.

== Stands ==
HOT plays downs cheers on each offensive down to energize the crowd, in addition to stands tunes during timeouts and other opportune times. A tune which has been used as both a stands tune and a down cheer is Rage Against the Machine's Bulls on Parade. Another stand tune played on 3rd downs is “#9” or the “Barbarian Horde” intends to get the crowd screaming to distract the opposing team. A popular favorite by many members of the band is a newer stands tune, "Big Bullin'" which is based on the rap song, "Big Ballin'" by artist Big Tymers. As of the 2023-24 season, new USF football coach, Alex Golesh forbids the band from playing on offense in order to provide a sterile atmosphere and enable total concentration of the football players during plays.

== Halftime ==
The Herd of Thunder performs several different halftime shows each year and performs during each home game at Raymond James Stadium, select away games, bowl games, and other exhibitions. After halftime at Raymond James, the band has a chance to get the crowd pumped up for the 2nd half, when returning to their section.

== Postgame ==
The Herd of Thunder concludes each game with a playing of the USF Alma Mater and the Marching Band's own personal alma mater, "The Mission". This portion of the game is always conducted by the Director of Athletic Bands. It used to be that when leaving the stadium, the HOT Drum Line parades out of Raymond James, with fans following, and ending with a final parking lot concert.

== 2013 London New Year's Day Parade ==
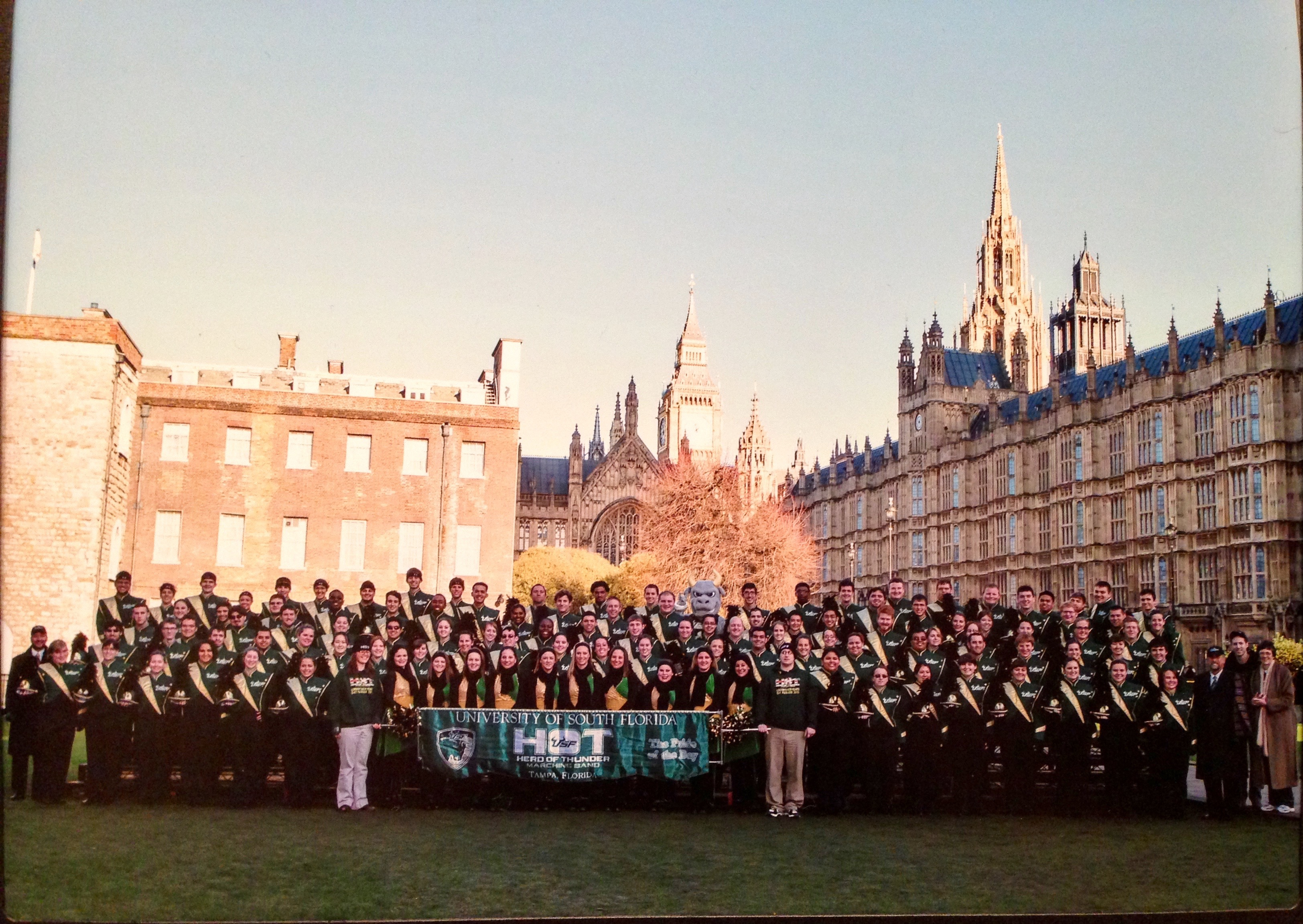
Herd of Thunder in London

On February 27, 2012, former Lord Mayor of Westminster Duncan Sandys visited the University of South Florida to formally present an invitation to the Herd of Thunder to participate in the 2013 London New Year's Day Parade. The band performed in a parade whose route extended through Piccadilly Circus, Regent Street, Trafalgar Square, and Whitehall; the street attendance was in excess of a half million people, and the worldwide television viewership was over 220 million.

== Gallery ==
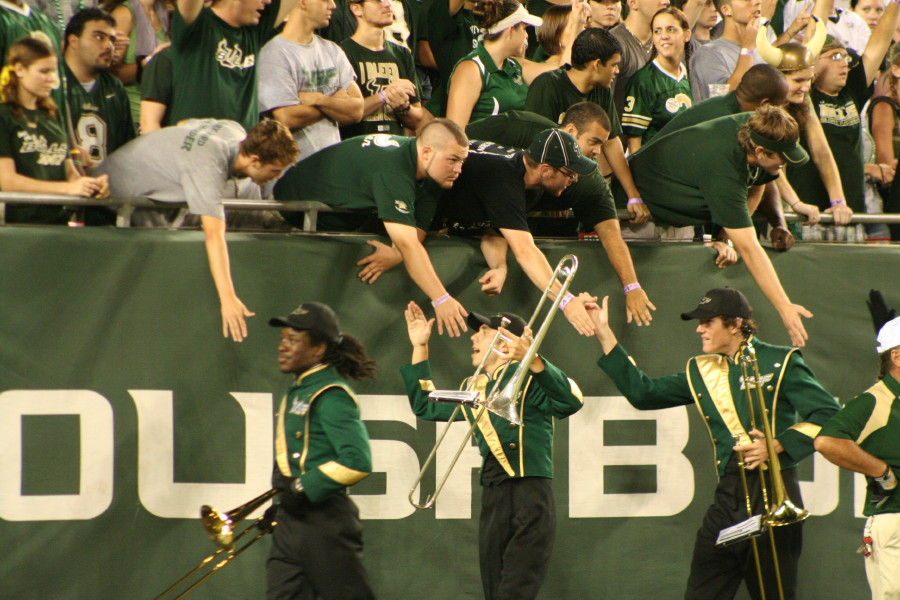
HOT members shake hands with fellow students after halftime.

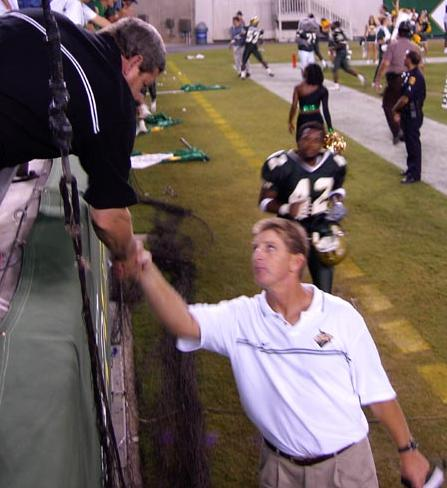
The Band Director shakes hand during a game

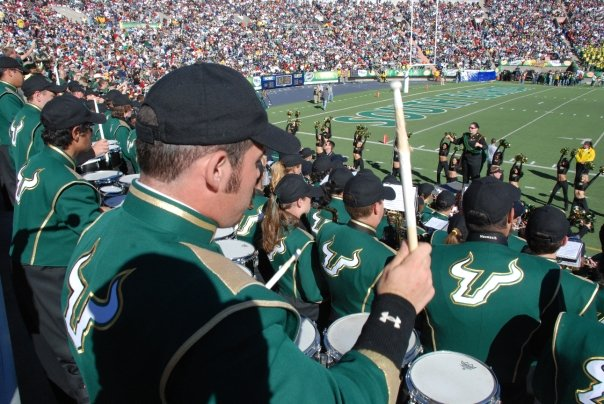
The Band performing in the Stands During the 2007 Sun Bowl in El Paso, Texas

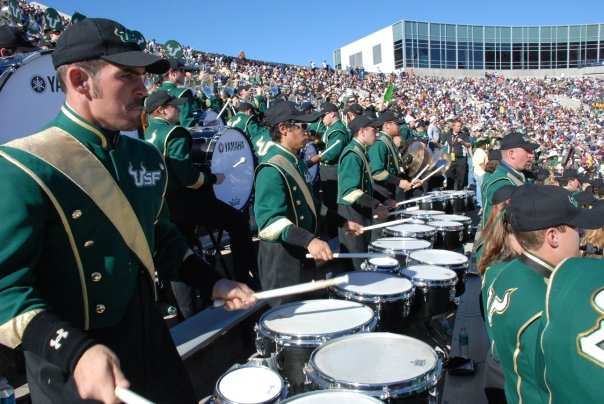
The Band performing in the Stands During the 2007 Sun Bowl in El Paso, Texas

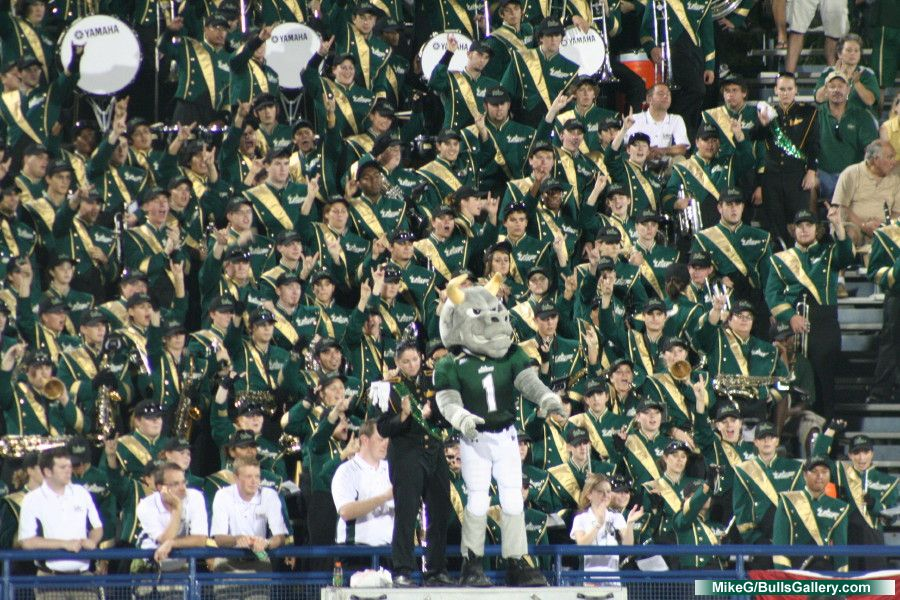
Rocky usually gives HOT a visit in the 3rd quarter, Home and away games

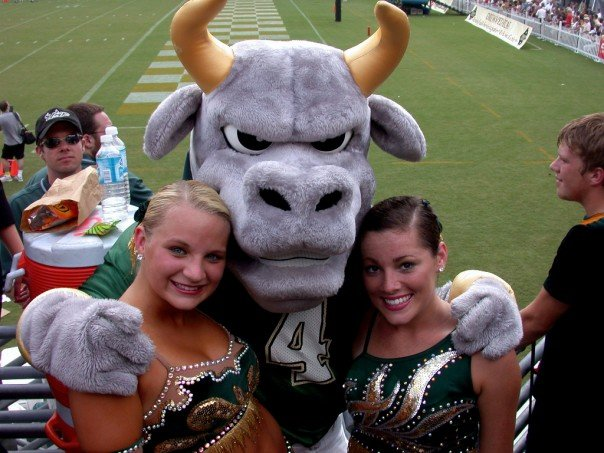
Rocky usually gives HOT a visit in the 3rd quarter, Home and away games

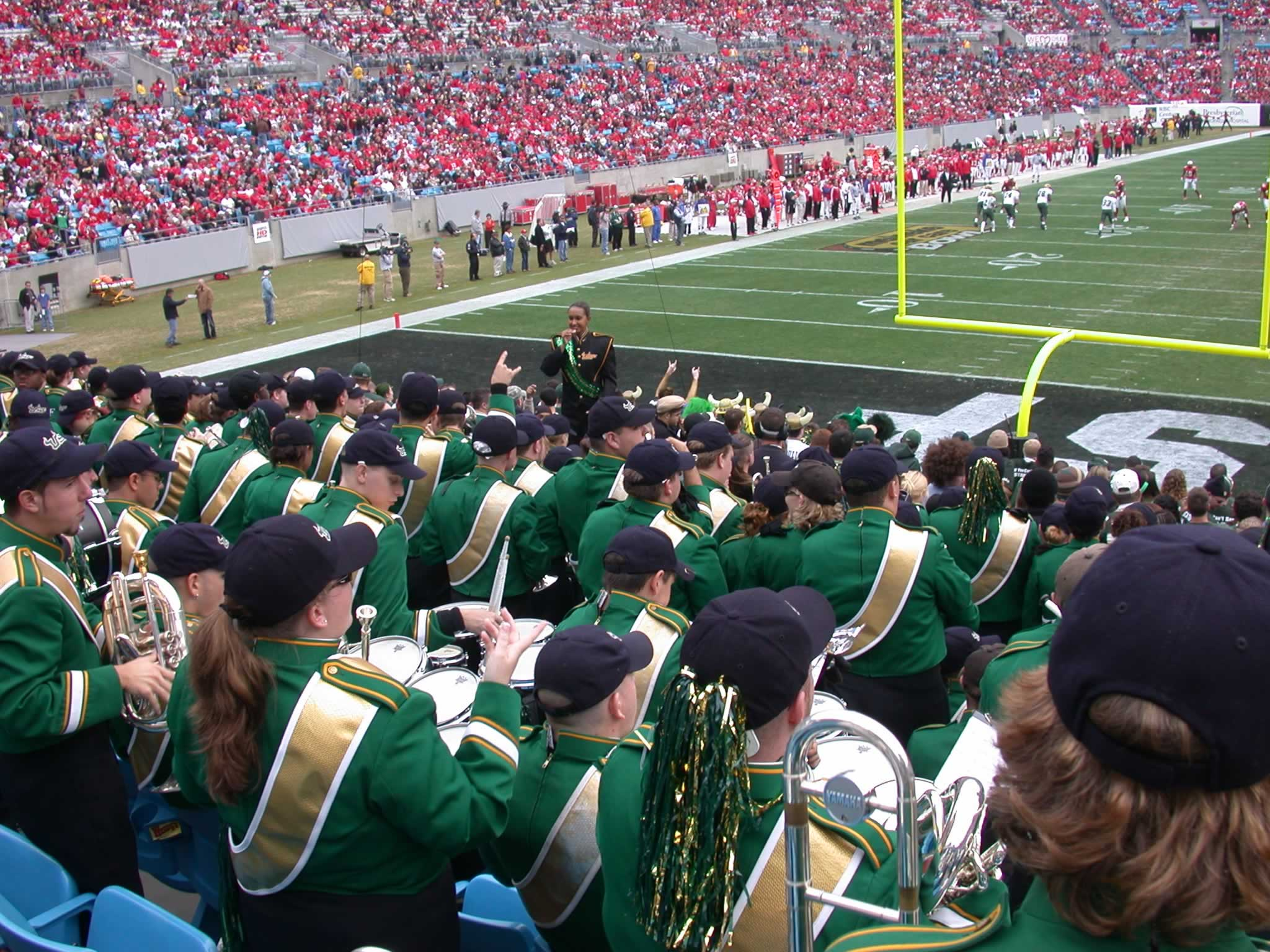
HOT Band at the 2005 Meineke Car Care Bowl in Charlotte, North Carolina against NC State

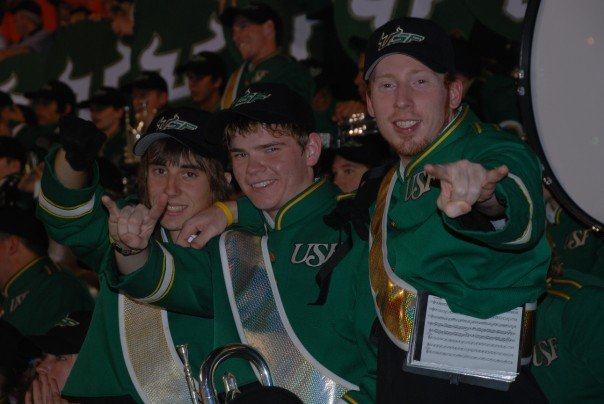
HOT Band at and Auburn–South Florida game.
