= Bulls Media =

- Tampa, Florida; United States
- Broadcast area: University of South Florida
- Branding: Bulls Media

Programming
- Format: College radio

Ownership
- Owner: University of South Florida Student Government

History
- First air date: 1988 (foundation/cable FM broadcasting); 1999 (AM broadcast); 2009-2014 (HD Radio)
- Former call signs: "WBUL" (1988 –2009), "WXBL" (transitional 2009)
- Call sign meaning: South Florida Bulls

Technical information
- Class: Part 15

Links
- Webcast: Listen (128kb/s MP3)
- Website: bullsmedia.org

Bulls Media, formerly Bulls Radio, is the University of South Florida's student-run internet radio station. Previously Bulls radio was broadcast on 1620 kHz on the USF campus and was the first college station to be carried on an HD Radio sub-channel, when it occupied WMNF's HD-2 channel from July 2009-July 2014.

The station is Florida's largest student-run radio station, and the entire operation of the station is by student workers and volunteers. The station is funded by the USF Student Government, and the station office and on-air studio are in the university's Marshall Student Center.

The station was started in 1988, and began its AM broadcasting in 1999. It began receiving funding in 2003.

In 2019 Bulls Radio was Rebranded to Bulls Media. Bulls Media dropped the radio station and what was built was a state of the art production studio. Ranging from podcasts, music production, and a space for live music recording. Bulls Media also offers DJ services, to DJ events for student organizations as well as one-on-one free DJ lessons free for students. Bulls Media also has their H.Y.P.E (Helping you promote events) graphic design services, which is free graphic design services for all USF student organizations.

== Programming ==
Bulls Radio's original programming represents over a dozen genres of music as well as daily news.

=== Bulls Unlimited ===
The programming also used to include sports shows and USF game broadcasts, but these shows (including live broadcasts of all USF football and men's and women's basketball games, plus games in baseball, beach volleyball, lacrosse, soccer, softball, and volleyball) are now available nationwide through the Bulls Unlimited channel, which launched in 2017 on IHeartRadio but is now on TuneIn. Bulls Unlimited also carried video streams on a service called Bullvision for some of the less popular sports until 2019, when the American Athletic Conference media deal moved most of these games to ESPN+.

== Controversy ==
Bulls Radio has been the subject of a few controversies since its inception. In June 2010, the USF Student Government President appointed Brett Farrar as the new director of Bulls Radio after an expedited interview process, despite having no previous experience at Bulls Radio or in the radio industry. Vocal opposition to the final USF Student Government Senate vote confirming Farrar's appointment was silenced when senators voted to remove "Open Forum" from the Senate Agenda during the following Senate meeting. In August 2010, anonymous grievances were filed against Farrar, student body President Cesar Hernandez and Vice President Spencer Montgomery, stating that they had "(broken) several statutes regarding executive branch confirmations on multiple occasions," which amounted to a "total of 10 counts of nonfeasance." In October, the USF Student Government Judiciary and Ethics Committee found that Student Government President Cesar Hernandez and the former Student Government Senate President Pro Tempore were in violation of two statutes when they hired new Student Government members over the summer, including the controversial appointment of Farrar.

== See also ==
- Campus radio
- List of college radio stations in the United States
- WUSF (FM) and WSMR — University of South Florida stations operated directly by the university
