= 1990 NCAA Rifle Championships =

1990 NCAA Rifle Championship
Tournament information
- Sport: Collegiate rifle shooting
- Location: Annapolis, Maryland
- Host: United States Naval Academy
- Venue: Bancroft Hall Rifle Range
- Participants: 6 teams

Final positions
- Champions: West Virginia (6th title)
- 1st runners-up: Navy
- 2nd runners-up: Tennessee Tech

Tournament statistics
- Smallbore: Michelle Scarborough, USF
- Air rifle: Gary Hardy, WVU

The 1990 NCAA Rifle Championships were contested at the 10th annual competition to determine the team and individual national champions of NCAA co-ed collegiate rifle shooting in the United States. The championship was held at the Bancroft Hall Rifle Range at the United States Naval Academy in Annapolis, Maryland.

West Virginia, with a team score of 6,205, once again retained the team championship, finishing 104 points ahead of hosts Navy. It was the Mountaineers third consecutive and sixth overall national title.

The individual champions were, for the smallbore rifle, Michelle Scarborough (South Florida), and Gary Hardy (West Virginia), for the air rifle.

== Qualification ==
Since there is only one national collegiate championship for rifle shooting, all NCAA rifle programs (whether from Division I, Division II, or Division III) were eligible. A total of six teams ultimately contested this championship.

== Results ==
- Scoring: The championship consisted of 120 shots by each competitor in smallbore and 40 shots per competitor in air rifle.

=== Team title ===
Rank	Team	Points
1st place, gold medalist(s)	West Virginia	6,205
2nd place, silver medalist(s)	Navy (H)	6,101
3rd place, bronze medalist(s)	Tennessee Tech	6,097
4	Murray State	6,094
5	Xavier	6,063
6	Alaska–Fairbanks	6,047

=== Individual events ===
Event	Winner	Score
Smallbore	Michelle Scarborough, South Florida	1,165
Air rifle	Gary Hardy, West Virginia	393
