= UCA Division I-A College National Championship =

College cheerleading competition

The Universal Cheerleaders Association Division I-A College Championships is a collegiate cheerleading competition held annually in the United States, organized by Varsity Spirit. The competition was first introduced in 1978 on CBS Sports. It hosts cheerleading squads from universities and colleges nationwide to perform routines consisting of gymnastics, partner stunts, dance moves, pyramids and high-tosses called basket tosses. The championship is split into large co-ed, small co-ed and all-girl divisions.

== History ==
The University of Kentucky has won the most large co-ed championships with 24 national titles, Hofstra University has won the most small co-ed championships with 10, and Indiana University has won the most all-girl titles with six. The competition was first introduced in 1978 on CBS Sports and is run by Varsity Spirit. The University of South Florida won the most recent co-ed event in 2026, winning their fourth title. The 2026 all-girl competition was won by the University of Alabama, their fouth title. Only four teams have ever won consecutive co-ed championships in UCA Division I-A history. The University of Kentucky has done it five times. The Wildcats first accomplished this in 1987–1988 and, most recently, from 2016 to 2019. The other cheerleading squads to achieve consecutive championships are the University of South Florida (2021–2023), NC State (1990–1991) and Ohio State University (1981–1983). Alabama and South Florida are the only schools who have won both the large co-ed and all girl divisions.

== Large co-ed champions by year ==
Universal Cheerleaders Association Co-ed Division I-A
- Sport: Cheerleading
- Founded: 1978
- Most recent champion: University of South Florida (4th title) (2026)
- Most titles: Kentucky Wildcats (24 titles)

- 2026 – University of South Florida
- 2025 – University of Alabama
- 2024 – University of Central Florida
- 2023 – University of South Florida
- 2022 – University of South Florida
- 2021 – University of South Florida
- 2020 – University of Central Florida
- 2019 – University of Kentucky
- 2018 – University of Kentucky
- 2017 – University of Kentucky
- 2016 – University of Kentucky
- 2015 – University of Alabama
- 2014 – University of Kentucky
- 2013 – University of Memphis
- 2012 – University of Kentucky
- 2011 – University of Alabama
- 2010 – University of Kentucky
- 2009 – University of Kentucky
- 2008 – University of Kentucky
- 2007 – University of Central Florida
- 2006 – University of Kentucky
- 2005 – University of Kentucky
- 2004 – University of Kentucky
- 2003 – University of Central Florida
- 2002 – University of Kentucky
- 2001 – University of Kentucky
- 2000 – University of Kentucky
- 1999 – University of Kentucky
- 1998 – University of Kentucky
- 1997 – University of Kentucky
- 1996 – University of Kentucky
- 1995 – University of Kentucky
- 1994 – University of North Carolina
- 1993 – Ohio State University
- 1992 – University of Kentucky
- 1991 – NC State University
- 1990 – NC State University
- 1989 – Louisiana State University
- 1988 – University of Kentucky
- 1987 – University of Kentucky
- 1986 – NC State University
- 1985 – University of Kentucky
- 1984 – University of Alabama
- 1983 – Ohio State University
- 1982 – Ohio State University
- 1981 – Ohio State University
- 1980 – Indiana State University
- 1979 – Michigan State University
- 1978 – University of North Carolina

== All-girl champions by year ==
Universal Cheerleaders Association All-Girl Division I-A
- Sport: Cheerleading
- Founded: 1978
- Most recent champion: University of Alabama (4th title) (2026)
- Most titles: University of Indiana (6 titles)

Indiana University is the leading all-time champion with 6 national titles in UCA collegiate cheerleading’s DIA All-Girl Division.

- 2026 – University of Alabama
- 2025 – University of Mississippi
- 2024 – University of South Florida
- 2023 – Western Kentucky University
- 2022 – University of Alabama
- 2021 – Western Kentucky University (& Virtual Champion- University of Oklahoma)
- 2020 – University of Alabama
- 2019 – Indiana University
- 2018 – University of Oklahoma
- 2017 – Indiana University
- 2016 – Indiana University
- 2015 – University of Alabama
- 2014 – Indiana University
- 2013 – Indiana University
- 2012 – Indiana University
- 2011 – Morehead State University
- 2010 – Morehead State University
- 2009 – San Diego State University
- 2008 – University of Memphis

== Small co-ed champions by year ==
- 2025 – Bowling Green State University
- 2024 – University of Memphis
- 2023 – Florida State University
- 2022 – Western Kentucky University
- 2021 – University of Memphis
- 2020 – University of Memphis
- 2019 – University of Memphis
- 2018 – Purdue University
- 2017 – University of Memphis
- 2016 – Hofstra University
- 2015 – Hofstra University
- 2014 – Bowling Green State University
- 2013 – Hofstra University
- 2012 – Hofstra University
- 2011 – Hofstra University
- 2010 – Hofstra University
- 2009 – Hofstra University
- 2008 – University of Louisiana- Monroe
- 2007 – Hofstra University
- 2006 – Hofstra University
- 2005 –
- 2004 –
- 2003 – Hofstra University
