= Dorothee Deuring =

Austrian sports shooter

Personal information
- Nationality: Austrian
- Born: 26 June 1968 (age 56); Sankt Gallen, Austria

Sport
- Sport: Sports shooting

Dorothee Deuring (born 27 June 1968 in Sank. Gallen) is an Austrian sport shooter. She competed in rifle shooting events at the 1988 Summer Olympics. Deuring attended the University of South Florida.

== Olympic results ==
| Event | 1988 |
|---|---|
| 50 metre rifle three positions (women) | T-20th |
