= Allison Jolly =

American sailor (born 1956)

Personal information
- Full name: Allison Blair Jolly
- Nationality: United States
- Born: August 4, 1956 (age 69) St. Petersburg, Florida, U.S.

Sport

Sailing career
- Club: St. Petersburg Yacht Club; Alamitos Bay Yacht Club
- College team: Florida State University
- Coach: University of South Florida
Medal record
Women's sailing
Representing the United States
Olympic Games
| Gold medal – first place | 1988 Seoul | 470 class |

Allison Blair Jolly (born August 4, 1956) is an American sailor and Olympic champion. Born in St. Petersburg, Florida, Jolly began sailing at the age of 10 and attended the Florida State University where she won the Inter-Collegiate Sailing Association National Championships in 1975 and 1976. In 1976 she placed second in the European women's championship, and also took second place in the Timmy Angsten Regatta. In 1976, at the age of 20, she became the youngest woman ever to win the US Sailor of the Year Awards, "considered the top prize in yachting in the U.S." and was presented the award again (along with Jewell) after the Olympics in 1988. In 1979, she won the Adams Cup with the St. Petersburg Yacht Club team.

After college, Jolly worked as a computer programmer in Valencia, California to support her sailing. She bought her first boat with $8,000 that she and her husband had saved for a down payment on a house. Her husband, Mark Elliot, also worked as a computer programmer and raced as a sailor.

In 1987, Jolly and her sailing partner Lynne Jewell entered the Olympic trials for the 1988 Summer Olympics. Despite a poor start in the qualifiers, the two rose to the top and won a spot. After qualifying, Jolly was "considered a long shot" in the event. In the first race of the games, Jolly and Jewell placed third, and in the next race, their boat capsized twice, but the two managed to stay in contention. After finishing strong in their remaining races, the two won the gold medal in the 470 Class with a convincing lead over the competition, causing the Washington Post to write that they "blew the competition out of the water." Jolly and Jewel were the only American sailors, male or female, to win a gold medal in the games. Their victory helped to promote the involvement of more women in sailing competitions.

Immediately after returning from the Olympics, Jolly continued sailing, entering the US Yacht Racing Union's Championship of Champions with her husband only three days later. In the Championship of Champions, Jolly raced a Snipe instead of the 470 she had raced in the Olympics and had a difficult time adjusting to the boat differences. As a result, she and Elliot placed ninth. In 1994, Jolly applied to join the first-ever all female team in the America's Cup yachting race, organized by Bill Koch. In a decision that shocked the yachting world, Jolly was cut from the team after tryouts and training, as was Lynne Jewell.

Jolly continues her sailing passion working at the University of South Florida as the head coach of the Bulls sailing team.

Jolly was inducted into the National Sailing Hall of Fame on November 9, 2019.
