= Kristen Peterson =

American sports shooter

Personal information
- Nationality: American
- Education: University of South Florida

Sport
- Sport: Riflery
Medal record
Women's shooting
Representing the United States
ISSF World Shooting Championships
Gold medal – first place	1990 Moscow	10m air rifle
Silver medal – second place	1990 Moscow	50m rifle 3 positions
Bronze medal – third place	1990 Moscow	50m rifle prone

Kristen Peterson is an American sports shooter. She competed in the 1988 Summer Olympics in Seoul and the 1992 Summer Olympics in Barcelona. She was also a member of Team USA in the 1990 ISSF World Shooting Championships, which won the gold medal in the 10 meter air rifle event, the silver medal in the 50 meter rifle three positions event, and the bronze medal in the 50 meter rifle prone event. Peterson attended the University of South Florida.
