= Rocky the Bull =

Mascot of the University of South Florida

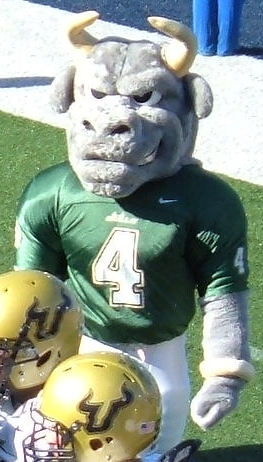
- Rocky the Bull
- University: University of South Florida
- Conference: The American
- Description: Bull
- First seen: 1965

Rocky D. Bull, known as Rocky the Bull is the mascot of the University of South Florida. He is an anthropomorphized bull who can typically be seen at athletic events dressed in USF athletic gear--usually a football or basketball jersey, but occasionally other attire like a USF T-shirt. In 2013, Rocky was named the best college mascot in the Capital One Mascot Challenge.

== History ==
Shortly after the university's inception in 1956, a contest was held that would determine the university's mascot. Among the finalists were the Brahman, the Olympian, the cougar, the buccaneer, and the golden eagle, and the Brahman bull was ultimately selected and unveiled as the mascot on November 17, 1962. Rocky's name was chosen as a play on the popular American delicacy Rocky Mountain oysters. His middle initial "D" stands for "dogie", a term referring to a motherless calf, reflecting Rocky's past.

Rocky started out in 1965 as a toy sold by the USF bookstore. His image was officially trademarked by the university in 1974, and debuted the next year. His birthday is celebrated every year during USF Week in April.

The USF athletics teams were known as the Golden Brahmans until the earlier 1980s, when the name was simplified to the Bulls. Rocky was redesigned in 1986 and 2003.

Rocky won the Capital One Mascot Challenge in 2013, besting Mike the Tiger (LSU), Sparty (Michigan State), and, in the finals, Raider Red (Texas Tech). Rocky is the first mascot to go undefeated in the Capital One Mascot Challenge.
