= Student Yachting World Cup =

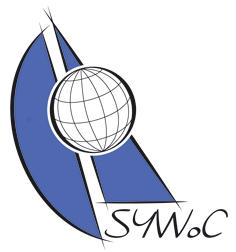

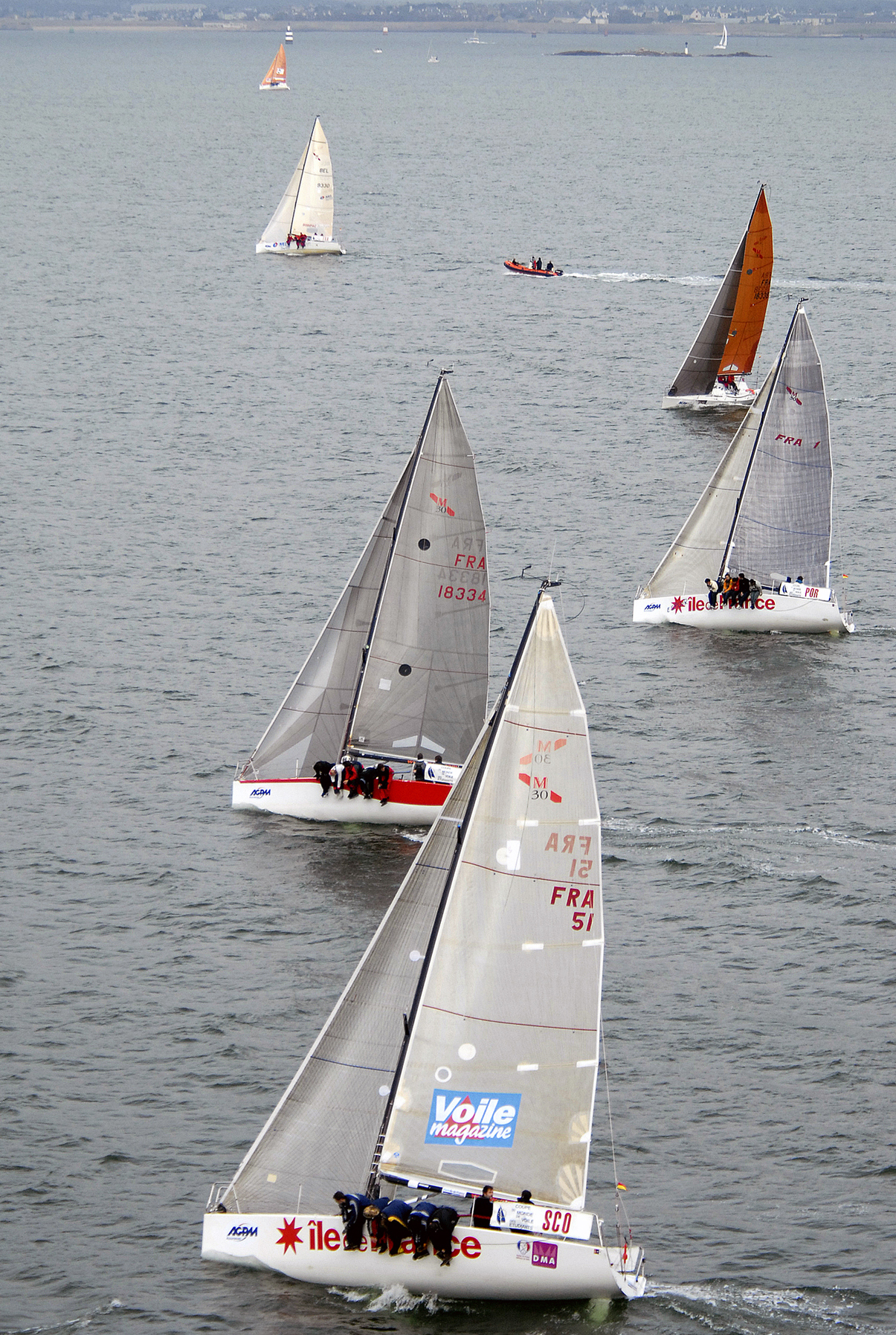

The Student Yachting World Cup (SYWoC) is an annual sailing competition for students which was created in 1979 and is held in France.

== 36th edition ==
The 36th edition of the Student Yachting World Cup took place in La Rochelle, France. The competitors sailed from November 2 to November 7 on Grand Surprise class sailboats.

== The Student Yachting World Cup ==
The SYWoC is an annual sailing competition organized by students at the École Polytechnique, a French engineering school, seeing the world's best student sailing teams confront each other in a week-long series of races. Every year, the SYWoC takes place around All Saints' Day and gather about 200 students in a large French harbour. Earlier editions have taken place in La Rochelle, Lorient, Royan, Marseille, La Trinité-sur-Mer, Toulon.

Each country can be represented in one team. This team is chosen on the basis of its national or international races, as well as on advice from the national sailing federation. The winner of the last edition and the Ecole Polytechnique, the organizing university, are also invited.

The World Cup is composed of several regattas, usually between 10 and 15, taking place during the whole week. The crews sail on Grand Surprise, a profile boat built for competition. The regattas are of "banana" or coastal type. A night regatta, starting in the afternoon and ending after nightfall, is also organised during the competition. An international jury arbitrate the regattas.

Two prizes are awarded every year:

- AGPM Trophy: Besides the general ranking, the competition provides an “inshore” ranking, determined from the inshore races. The winner of the ranking is awarded the AGPM trophy.
- Student Yachting World Cup: the winner of the regattas is awarded the Student Yachting World Cup which he shall bring back into play for the following edition.

== History ==
The Student Yachting World Cup, former Course de l'Europe, has been organized since 1979 by students at the École Polytechnique. Each year, the best sailing teams from universities all around the world meet and compete in thrilling yacht races.

When the "Course de l'Europe" was created in 1979, only a few European countries participated. Other teams have joined in, from Eastern Europe, Japan, the United States or Australia, thus making it a real World Cup.

The race changed its name to "Student Yachting World Cup" and became the only competition to deliver the ISAF title of "Student Yachting World Champion". Today, between 15 and 20 teams, from Europe, America, Asia and Australia, compete each year for the title.

== Past winners ==
Year	Location	Winning team	University
1980		Italy	University of Bologna, Faculty of Engineering
1981		Switzerland	Ecole Polytechnique Fédérale de Lausanne
1982		Switzerland	Ecole Polytechnique Fédérale de Lausanne
1983		Finland	Helsinki University of Technology
1984		Sweden	Royal Institute of Technology, Stockholm
1985		Switzerland	Ecole Polytechnique Fédérale de Lausanne
1986		England	Aston University, Birmingham
1987		England	Aston University, Birmingham
1988		France	Ecole Polytechnique
1989		Sweden	Lund Institute of Technology
1990		United States	University of Rhode Island, Kingston
1991		Norway	Norwegian Institute of Technology, Trondheim
1992		Denmark	Technical University of Denmark, Copenhagen
1993		England	University of Portsmouth
1994		Finland	Åbo Akademi University, Turku
1995		Switzerland	Ecole Polytechnique Fédérale de Lausanne
1996		France	INSA Lyon
1997		France	INSA Lyon
1998		France	Institute of Engineering Science, Montpellier
1999		Denmark	Technical University of Denmark, Copenhagen
2000		Scotland	University of Strathclyde
2001	Royan	Netherlands	Erasmus University Rotterdam
2002	Toulon	Netherlands	Erasmus University Rotterdam
2003		Scotland	University of Strathclyde
2004		England	Southampton Solent University
2005	No SYWoC organized		
2006	Lorient	Ireland	Trinity College, Dublin
2007	La Rochelle	Switzerland	Ecole Polytechnique Fédérale de Lausanne
2008	La Trinité-sur-Mer	Ireland	Cork Institute of Technology
2009	Marseille	Italy	CUS Milano
2010	La Rochelle	England	Southampton Solent University
2011	La Trinité-sur-Mer	France	Euromed Arthur Loyd
2012	La Rochelle	Ireland	University College Dublin
2013	Pornic	France	Kedge Business School
2014	La Rochelle	England	University of Southampton
2015	Le Pouliguen	Switzerland	Ecole Polytechnique Fédérale de Lausanne
2016	La Rochelle	Canada	Queen's University
2017	Marseille	Japan	Kobe University
