= Michael Kelly (athletic director) =

College athletics administrator

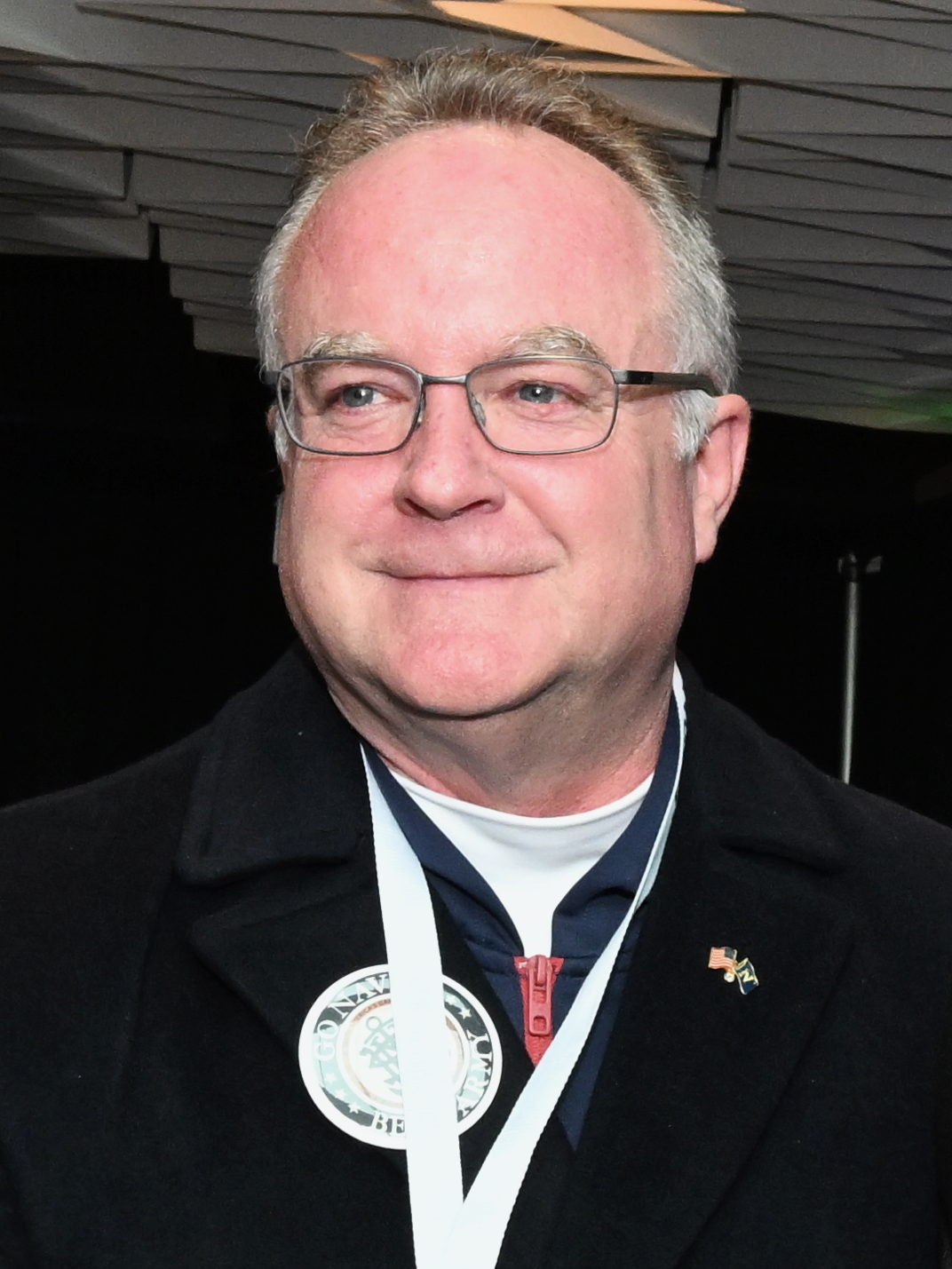
- Kelly in 2025

Current position
- Title: Athletic Director
- Team: Navy Midshipmen
- Conference: AAC

Biographical details
- Born: July 20, 1970 (age 56); Washington, D.C., U.S.
- Education: Wake Forest University

Administrative career (AD unless noted)
- 1995–1998: Wake Forest University (Director of Athletics Facilities/Event Management)
- 1998–1999: Tampa Bay Final Four Organizing Committee (Executive Director)
- 1999–2001: Tampa Bay Super Bowl Host Committee (President)
- 2001–2002: University of South Florida (Associate AD)
- 2002–2005: Jacksonville Super Bowl Host Committee (President)
- 2005–2007: South Florida Super Bowl Host Committee (President)
- 2007–2012: Atlantic Coast Conference (Sr. Associate Commissioner)
- 2012–2018: College Football Playoff (Chief Operating Officer)
- 2018–2025: University of South Florida (VP/AD)
- 2025–present: United States Naval Academy

Michael Kelly is an American college athletics administrator. He is currently the athletic director at the United States Naval Academy, a position he has held since 2025, as well as a member of the NCAA Division I Council since 2021. Prior to becoming the AD at USNA, Kelly served in many high level positions throughout college athletics, including as vice president for athletics at the University of South Florida, commissioner of the Atlantic Coast Conference, and the chief operating officer for the College Football Playoff. He is the first person to serve as the president of the Super Bowl host committee for three different communities, doing so for Super Bowl XXXV in Tampa, Super Bowl XXXIX in Jacksonville, and Super Bowl XLI in Miami. He was also the executive director for the organizing committee for the 1999 Men's Final Four, which was held in St. Petersburg.

== Early life and education ==
Kelly was born on July 20, 1970, in Washington, D.C., and attended St. John's College High School, where he is today a member of the board of trustees. He graduated Magna Cum Laude from Wake Forest University to earn his bachelors degree in politics in 1992, and earned his master's in sports administration from St. Thomas University in Miami in 1994. While attending St. Thomas in 1993, Kelly served as an intern for the then-Florida Marlins during their inaugural season.

== Career ==
Kelly played an instrumental role in securing the Tampa Bay area as hosts for the 1999 Men's Final Four at Tropicana Field in St. Petersburg and for Super Bowl XXXV at Raymond James Stadium in Tampa. He was the executive director of the 1999 Final Four Organizing Committee and president of the Super Bowl XXXV Host Committee. He would later also serve as the president of the host committees for Super Bowl XXXIX and Super Bowl XLI. From 2007-2012 he served as Senior Associate Commissioner at the Atlantic Coast Conference where he oversaw football, communications and broadcasting.

In June 2001, five months after the successful Super Bowl XXXV, Kelly was appointed as associate athletic director at the University of South Florida in Tampa. He left after one year to become the director of athletic facilities and athletic operations at his alma mater of Wake Forest.

In 2006, Kelly left Wake Forest to become the senior associate commissioner of the Atlantic Coast Conference. While there, he oversaw football broadcasting and communications.

In 2012, Kelly became the first chief operating officer of the College Football Playoff.

In 2018, Kelly took the job as vice president of athletics at the University of South Florida.

Kelly was appointed the athletic director at the United States Naval Academy in 2025.

In addition to his athletic directorial work, Kelly serves as vice chair of the NCAA's Championships Oversight Committee, the President's board of advisors for St. Thomas University, and the board of trustees for St. John's College High School.

== Personal life ==
Kelly and his wife Lisa have two daughters.

== Honors ==
In 2006, Kelly was named to Sports Business Journal's 40 under 40 list and was presented with the St. Thomas University Distinguished Alumnus Award.
