= War on I-4 =

Rivalry between the South Florida Bulls and UCF Knights

- South Florida Bulls UCF Knights
- Sports: Baseball, Men's Basketball, Women's Basketball, Women's Cross Country, Football, Men's Golf, Women's Golf, Men's Soccer, Women's Soccer, Softball, Men's Tennis, Women's Tennis, Women's Track & Field, Volleyball
- Locations: Tampa, Florida, (Bulls); Orlando, Florida, (Knights)
- Teams: University of South Florida; University of Central Florida
- First meeting: 1971 (baseball) (Note: UCF claims the first baseball meeting was in 1973); 1972 (men's basketball); 1973 (women's basketball) (Note: UCF claims the first women's basketball meeting was in 1978); 1974 (men's soccer, (Note: UCF claims the first men's soccer meeting was in 1975) volleyball (Note: UCF claims the first volleyball meeting was in 1976)); 1978 (men's tennis); 1994 (women's tennis); 1998 (women's soccer); 2003 (softball); 2005 (football); 2013 (cross country); 2014 (men's golf, women's golf, track and field); 2016 (official War on I-4 series)
- Stadiums: South Florida: Raymond James Stadium, Yuengling Center, Corbett Stadium, USF Baseball Stadium, USF Softball Stadium; UCF: FBC Mortgage Stadium, Addition Financial Arena, UCF Soccer and Track Stadium John Euliano Park

Statistics
- All-time series: Baseball: 89–86 South Florida (Note: UCF claims the all time baseball record is 86–85 South Florida); In conference: 26–24 UCF; Men's Basketball: 28–19 South Florida (Note: Two wins by UCF vacated); In conference: 14–7 UCF; Women's Basketball: 32–17 South Florida (Note: UCF claims the all time women's basketball record is 29–14 South Florida); In conference: 13–9 South Florida; Football: 8–6 UCF; In conference: 8–2 UCF; Men's Soccer: 29–10–6 South Florida (Note: UCF claims the all time men's soccer record is 28–10–6 South Florida); In conference: 8–5 South Florida; Women's Soccer: 15–7–4 UCF; In conference: Tied 5–5–4; Softball: 23–19 UCF; In conference: 21–10 UCF; Men's Tennis: 37–17 South Florida; In conference: 8–7 South Florida; Women's Tennis: 20–13 South Florida; In conference: 8–5 UCF; Volleyball: 50–45 South Florida (Note: UCF claims the all time volleyball record is 48–44); In conference: 20–0 UCF; Conference Championship Meets: 37–9 UCF; Women's Cross Country: 8–2 UCF; Men's Golf: 6–3 South Florida; Women's Golf: 8–1 UCF; Women's Indoor Track and Field: 9–0 UCF; Women's Outdoor Track and Field: 9–0 UCF; Total: 326–290–10 South Florida (Note: UCF claims the all time total record is 317–285–10); Total in conference: 160–91–4 UCF
- Postseason results: Total: 18–15–2 South Florida; Conference Tournaments: Tied 11–11–2; Conference Championship Games: Tied 4–4–1 (included in tournament record); NCAA tournaments: 6–4 South Florida; Other postseason meetings: 1–0 South Florida
- Trophy series: 7–0 UCF (Note: It is currently unknown if the trophy is still being awarded due to UCF's move to the Big 12 in 2023. If the trophy is still being awarded, the record would be 10–0 UCF) (Note: Counting seasons the trophy was not officially awarded, the record is 30–20–6 South Florida (with the games not recognized by UCF being removed, this becomes 29–20–6 South Florida), with the conference record being 9–1 UCF); In conference: 7–0 UCF

The War on I-4 is a college rivalry between the University of Central Florida Knights and University of South Florida Bulls. The rivalry is best known for its college football matchup which originated in a series of football games played from 2005 to 2008 and now takes place on Thanksgiving weekend, the de facto "rivalry weekend" for FBS football. From 2013 to 2023, when both schools were part of the American Athletic Conference, the schools began competing annually in all sports both schools sponsored (with the 1993–94 season being the only other season the schools competed in every sport both schools sponsored). In 2016, the schools officially adopted the "War on I-4" as an official competition series. Each year, the team with the most wins across all sports receives a gold trophy styled after an Interstate 4 (I-4) road sign with the logos of each school. The winner of the annual football game also receives a similar trophy.

Locations of South Florida and UCF

As of August 28, 2026, South Florida holds the all-time series lead for seven of the ten sports in which the schools meet head-to-head: baseball (89–86), men's basketball (28–19), women's basketball (32–17), men's soccer (29–10–6), men's tennis (37–17), women's tennis (20–13) and volleyball (50–45); but UCF disputes the all time records in baseball, women's basketball, men's soccer, and volleyball, claiming the Bulls' records in these sports are 86–85, 29–14, 28–9–6, and 48–44, respectively. The only sports where UCF leads the all time head-to-head series are women's soccer (15–7–4), softball (23–19), football (8–6), and conference championship meets (37–9, though South Florida leads 6–3 in Men's Golf). UCF leads the all time trophy series 7–0 (potentially 10–0 if the trophy continued to be awarded after they left the AAC for the Big 12).

The Knights also led overall while both schools were in the American Athletic Conference with a 160–91–4 record in conference games against the Bulls across all sports, whereas the all-time total across all sports is 326–290–10 in favor of the Bulls. The two teams were tied 11–11–2 (Note: Both ties occurred in the AAC Women's Soccer Tournament. UCF advanced on penalty kicks in the 2013 semifinal and South Florida won on penalty kicks in the 2017 championship game, but these games are still listed as ties in official records.) all time in conference tournament matches and the teams are tied 4–4–1 in conference championship games (though South Florida has actually won five conference championships head-to-head against the Knights; the tie denotes that their 2017 women's soccer title was won on penalty kicks). The Bulls are 6–4 against UCF in NCAA tournament games and 1–0 in other postseason meetings, (Note: The other postseason meeting was in the 2024 National Invitation Tournament.) making the overall postseason total 18–15–2 in favor of the Bulls.

As the schools are now in separate conferences, they meet less often in sporting events than they did from 2013 to 2023.

== Names ==
Starting when the schools first met on the gridiron in 2005, some writers dubbed the rivalry the "War on I-4". When the series resumed in 2013, administrators from both schools named it the "I-4 Corridor Clash". Both names refer to Interstate 4, an interstate highway that runs through both Orlando and Tampa. In 2016, when the schools announced the official competition, they formally adopted the "War on I-4" name.

The name "War on I-4" had previously been used for an arena football rivalry between the Tampa Bay Storm and Orlando Predators from 1992 to 2016. The Storm and Predators were located in the same metropolitan areas as South Florida and UCF respectively and were two of the most successful franchises in the league, with the Storm winning five Arena Bowls and the Predators winning two. The name became available when the Predators folded following the 2016 season.

== Series history ==
=== Beginning ===
Founded in 1956 and 1963, respectively, the University of South Florida and the University of Central Florida are located 98 miles (158 km) away from each other in Tampa and Orlando, which combined make up the fourth-largest media market in the United States. The short distance between the schools, combined with their athletic programs concurrent establishment and rise to NCAA Division I helped create a natural rivalry between the two, which only became stronger when both became members of the American Athletic Conference in 2013. The first meeting between the then-Florida Technological University Knights of the Pegasus (UCF) and the University of South Florida Golden Brahmans that both schools agree happened (South Florida claims the schools played two baseball games in 1971 that UCF does not recognize) was a 1972 men's basketball game in Tampa. The Golden Brahmans won this game, 115–96. Since that game, South Florida and UCF have begun series against each other in eight or nine other sports, depending on which schools' records are used.

=== Official War on I-4 rivalry ===
On September 21, 2016, the morning of the first meeting of the season between the Bulls and Knights with a volleyball game set to take place in Orlando that evening, both athletic departments announced the official recognition of the "War on I-4" rivalry series. The schools compete each school year in 14 sports for bragging rights, with each sports team's record counting equally toward a final tally for each program.

=== Trophy ===
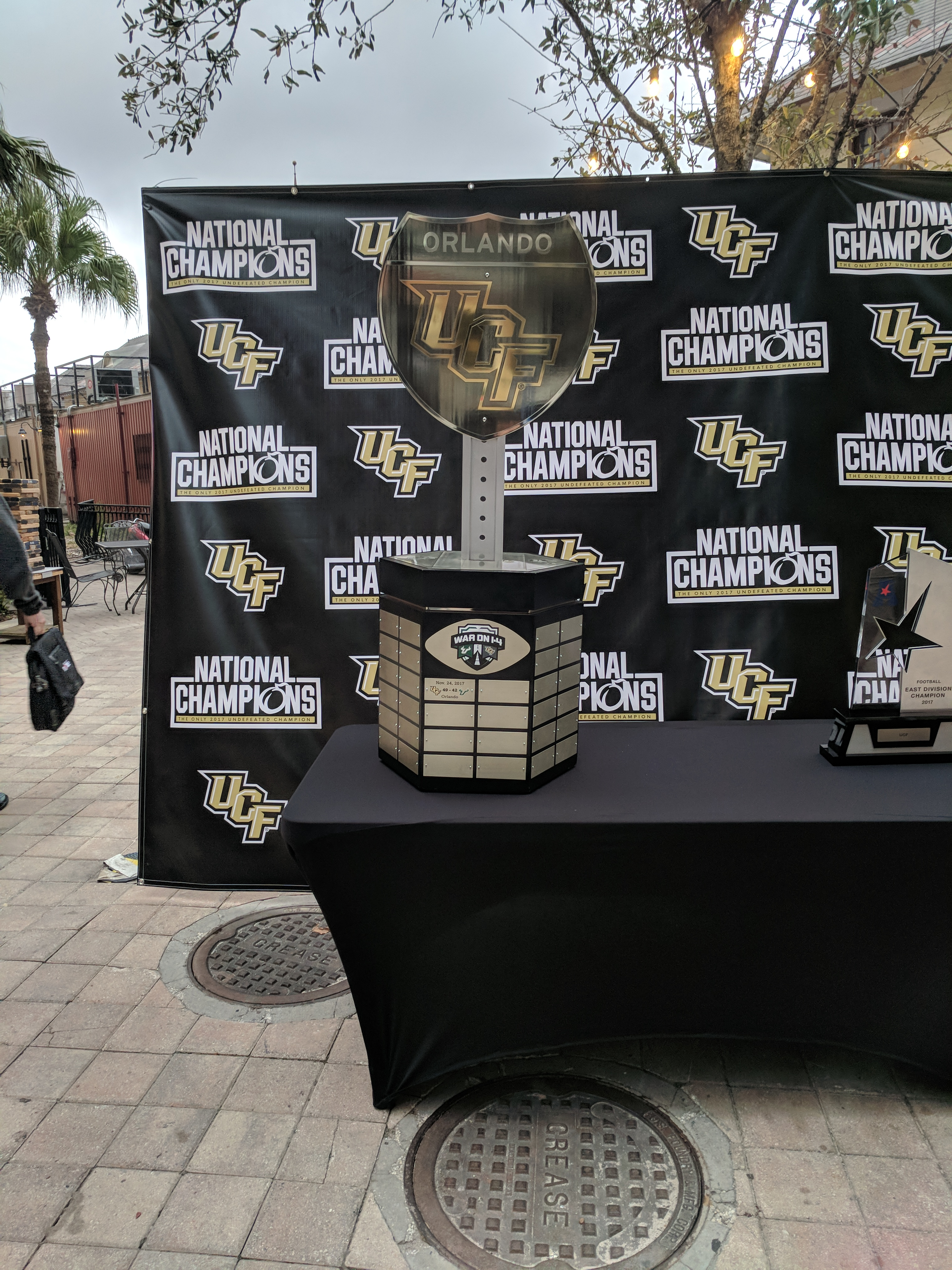
The UCF/Orlando side of the football trophy

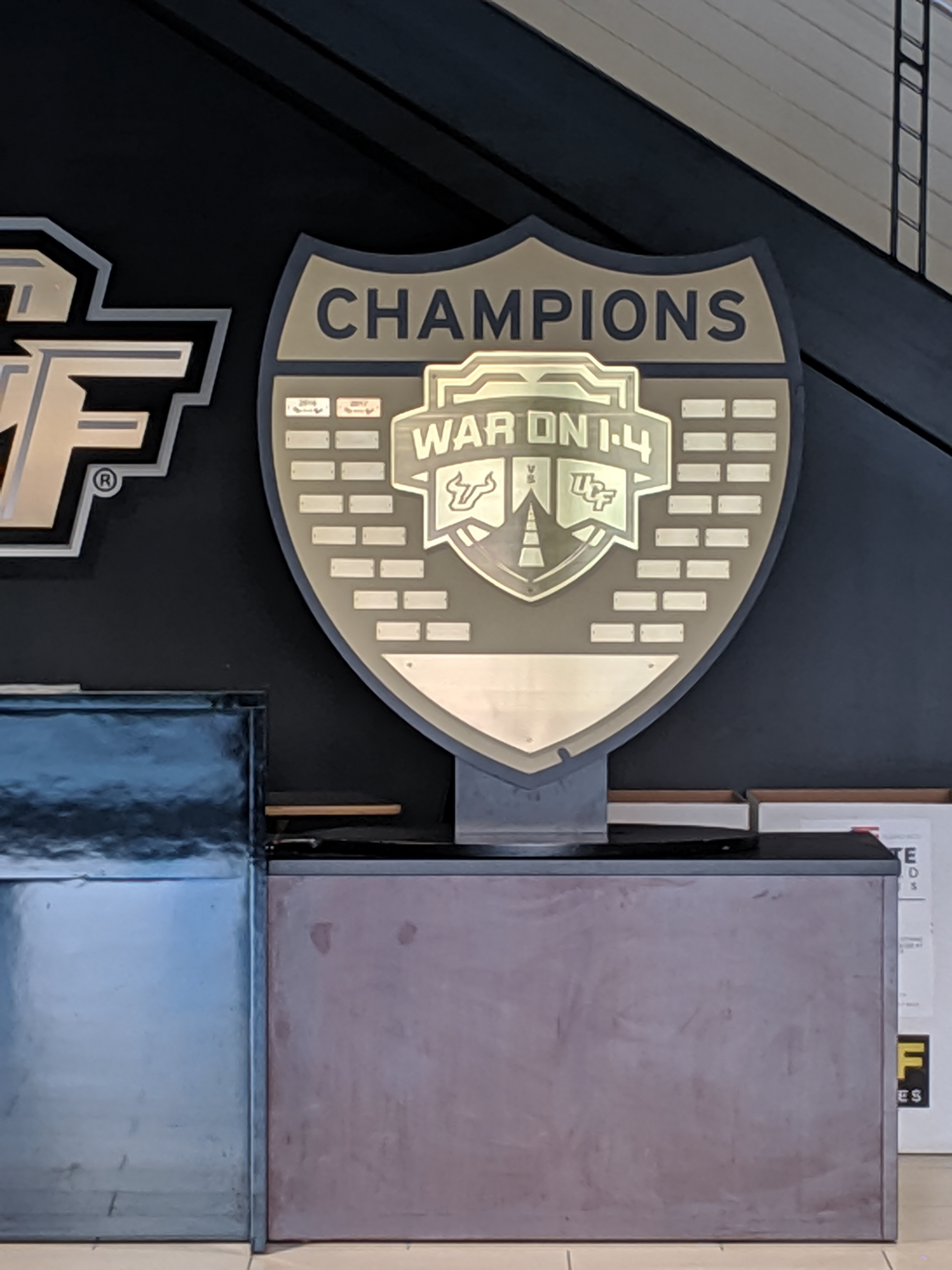
The overall War on I-4 trophy

The winner of each the football competition and the overall competition each year takes possession of a large trophy shaped like the iconic I-4 road sign, which will be displayed on their campus for the following year. Each trophy is similar but has a few key differences. The all-sports trophy has the War on I-4 logo on it and features the score of each season's overall competition. It is also significantly larger than the football trophy. The football trophy is dual-sided, with one side of the trophy reading "Tampa" and featuring South Florida's logo while the other reads "Orlando" and features UCF's logo. The football trophy also has a large base, which is detachable. Including the base, the football trophy measures 4 feet 3 inches (1.30 m) tall and weighs 160 pounds (73 kg). The score of each game is featured on the base.

Unlike the Vince Lombardi Trophy or Larry O'Brien Trophy, which are permanently awarded to the victor every year, both the football and overall War on I-4 trophies are traveling trophies which are kept by the winner until the other team wins it, similar to the Stanley Cup.

=== Future ===
With UCF leaving the American Athletic Conference for the Big 12 Conference at the start of the 2023–24 school year, the rivalry series has not been able to continue in the prior format, especially considering the schools are guaranteed to no longer meet in golf, cross country, or track and field. It is likely that football in particular will be on hiatus until at least 2031, because that is the next year when both teams have multiple openings in their non-conference schedules.

It is unknown if the trophy is still being awarded, albeit with fewer sports than before, with the winner being based on those meetings, or if the trophy series is put on hold, as South Florida has yet to win the point series since the trophy was introduced, hence no changing of hands has been required with the trophy. Neither school has acknowledged the trophy since 2023.

For 2023–24, South Florida and UCF only met in a 3-game series in baseball, and a single Men's Tennis and Women's Soccer game, plus a postseason meeting in men's basketball via the 2024 National Invitation Tournament.

For 2024–25 and 2025–26, South Florida and UCF only played single games of Men's Soccer, Women's Soccer, and Women's Tennis, along with two games for Men's Tennis, and a 3-game series in baseball.

For 2026–27, so far, South Florida and UCF only played single games of Men's Soccer and Women's Soccer.

== Point system ==
Since September 21, 2016, when the rivalry series was officially established, South Florida and UCF have scored their competitions in the 14 sports represented at both universities (South Florida is the only one of the two schools to sponsor men's cross country, women's sailing, and men's track & field while UCF is the only one of the two schools to sponsor women's rowing). Each sport is worth 6 total points, meaning the point system typically grants:

- 1 point to the winner of each regular season baseball game (6 games per year)
- 3 points to the winner of each regular season men's basketball game (2 games per year)
- 3 points to the winner of each regular season women's basketball game (2 games per year)
- 6 points to the higher finisher at the American Athletic Conference Women's Cross Country Championship
- 6 points to the winner of the annual football game
- 6 points to the higher finisher at the American Athletic Conference Men's Golf Championship
- 6 points to the higher finisher at the American Athletic Conference Women's Golf Championship
- 6 points to the winner the each regular season men's soccer match (3 points awarded to each side in the event of a draw)
- 6 points to the winner of the annual regular season women's soccer match (3 points awarded to each side in the event of a draw)
- 2 points to the winner of each regular season softball game (3 games per year)
- 6 points to the winner of the annual regular season men's tennis match.
- 6 points to the winner of the annual regular season women's tennis match.
- 3 points to the higher finisher at the American Athletic Conference Women's Indoor Track & Field Championship
- 3 points to the higher finisher at the American Athletic Conference Women's Outdoor Track & Field Championship
- 3 points to the winner of each regular season volleyball match (2 matches per year)
- In the event of a tie in the overall competition, the athletic program that scores higher in the annual NCAA Graduation Success Rate will be awarded 1 extra point and crowned as the champion for that season. In the unlikely event that this is also tied, the series ends as a tie for that season and the previous winner retains the trophy.

In some years the scoring is slightly different. For example, South Florida and UCF only met once in women's basketball for the 2016–2017 season, so that game was worth all 6 points. Likewise, in 2020 and 2021 the sides played two men's soccer matches instead of one, which were worth 3 points each and awarded 1.5 points to each in the event of a draw. In all, there are 84 available points with 43 points required to clinch the title. As mentioned above, only regular season matches are counted toward War on I-4 point totals for the 10 sports in which the teams compete head-to-head, meaning if the Bulls and Knights meet in an exhibition game, conference championship, NCAA tournament, or a football bowl game, that game would not count for War on I-4 competition purposes.

== Trophy series results ==
UCF clinched the first academic year's overall title with an AAC women's golf championship on April 18, 2017. The 2016–17 competition ended on May 20 with a 3–2 Knights victory in a baseball game, making the final point total 51 points to 33 points for UCF.

On April 17, 2018, the Knights clinched the overall title for the second consecutive year, again in the AAC women's golf championship. UCF finished second in the event, while South Florida finished ninth. The series concluded on May 13 with UCF placing higher than South Florida in the 2018 American Athletic Conference outdoor track and field competition and led to a final series score of 49–35 for UCF.

UCF clinched the overall title for the third straight year on April 7, 2019, with a 5–0 victory in baseball, the earliest clinch in the competition's history. The series concluded on May 12 with UCF placing higher than South Florida in the American Athletic Conference women's outdoor track and field competition, making the final score 70–14 in favor of the Knights, the largest margin of victory in the competition's history.

The 2019–20 edition ended in March due to spring sports being canceled because of the COVID-19 pandemic. UCF led the series 36–9 at the time of the cancellation and was awarded the victory for the season, even though the schedule was not complete and UCF did not meet the point thresholds for winning in a normal season. This marked UCF's fourth-consecutive win in the War on I-4.

The pandemic also caused the point system to slightly change for the 2020–21 edition of the rivalry. The AAC Women's Indoor Track & Field Championship was canceled, so the higher finisher at the AAC Women's Outdoor Track & Field Championship received 6 points instead of 3. Men's tennis and men's soccer both met twice in the regular season instead of once, so each of these matches counted for 3 points toward the victor's total rather than the usual 6. In addition there were four softball games and eight baseball games instead of the usual three of each, so each game was worth 1.5 and 0.75 points respectively rather than 2. UCF clinched the overall competition for the fourth time on April 17, 2021, with a 5–4 baseball win in Orlando. The point series ended on May 16 when UCF finished one place above South Florida in the women's outdoor track and field championship, making the total score 59.25–24.75, but the last meeting of the season between the two schools took place on May 30 when South Florida beat UCF in the 2021 American Athletic Conference baseball tournament championship game, though this did not add to South Florida's point total as it was a postseason meeting.

For the 2021–22 season, most of the sports reverted to their usual schedules, with the exception of men's soccer staying at two games per year and baseball changing to six games per year. On April 16, 2022, UCF officially clinched the series for the 2021–22 season, securing the 43 points needed after defeating South Florida 4–0 in women's tennis. The final score for the season was 58–26.

During 2022–23, the final season with both teams in the American Athletic Conference, UCF started out with scoring 24 of the first 30 points (only losing the Men's Soccer game) to take an early commanding 24–6 lead, but South Florida would rally to score 14 of the next 17 points (only being outranked in the Women's AAC Indoor Track & Field Championship) to cut the UCF lead to a closer 27–20 before UCF scored 36 of the last 37 points (losing only one Men's Baseball game) to win in a 63–21 blowout, officially clinching after finishing higher than South Florida in the AAC women's golf championship on April 19, 2023.

During 2023–24, the first non-conference season since 2012–13 and the continued awarding of the trophy being uncertain, the two schools only played regular season games in Women's Soccer, Men's Tennis, and Baseball, resulting in 18 points up for grabs, with 10 needed to win. UCF won the Women's Soccer game to take a 6–0 lead on September 10, which would be the last meeting between the two schools for almost six months before the two schools met again on March 1 in both Men's Tennis and game one of the 3-game baseball series. UCF won both games that day, clinching the point series. South Florida would win one of the two remaining baseball games for a 16–2 UCF win. It is unknown if UCF officially won the trophy this season or not, as they have not officially been announced to have won the trophy, and would retain possession of the trophy regardless of if it was officially awarded this season or not. The two schools would also meet in round one of the 2024 National Invitation Tournament in men's basketball, a meeting which South Florida beat UCF 83–77.

During 2024–25, the two schools only scheduled regular season games in five sports, resulting in 30 points up for grabs, with 16 needed to win. The fall slate included a Women's Soccer game on September 5 and a Men's Soccer game on September 15. South Florida won the Women's Soccer game and tied the Men's Soccer game, giving them a 9–3 lead. The spring slate included Men's Tennis games on February 3 and March 9, a Women's Tennis game on February 9, and a 3-game series in Baseball from February 28 to March 2. UCF won the first Men's Tennis game to cut the South Florida lead to 9–6 before winning the Women's Tennis game to take a 12–9 lead. In Baseball, South Florida won the first game via mercy rule to narrow the UCF lead to 12–11 before UCF returned the favor with two mercy rule wins of their own to clinch the point series. South Florida then won the Men's Tennis game to narrow their loss to 16–14.

During the 2025–26 season, the two teams met in the same set of sports as the prior year. This time, however, it was UCF that took the early 9–3 lead by winning the Women's Soccer game, with the Men's Soccer game ending tied for a second straight year. UCF clinched the point series on January 18 by winning both the Men's Tennis and Women's Tennis games at home that day. South Florida won 2 of the 3 Baseball games and UCF won the second Men's Tennis game, resulting in a 23–7 UCF win.

During the ongoing 2026–27 season, the two have currently met in single games in both Men's Soccer and Women's Soccer. UCF won both these games to take a 12–0 lead. No spring sports have been announced as scheduled yet.

=== Overall results table ===
| Season | | Baseball | Men's Basketball | Women's Basketball | Women's Cross Country | Football | Men's Golf | Women's Golf | Men's Soccer | Women's Soccer | Softball | Men's Tennis | Women's Tennis | Women's Track & Field | Volleyball | Winner | Score |
|---|---|---|---|---|---|---|---|---|---|---|---|---|---|---|---|---|---|
| 1970-71 (Note: Teams competed in separate conferences, hence not all sports were contested.) (Note: Trophy was not officially awarded to the winning team this season.) (Note: UCF does not recognize the baseball results from this season.) | South Florida wins | 1 | —N/a (Note: Sport not founded yet at South Florida.) | —N/a (Note: Sport not founded yet at FTU/UCF.) | —N/a (Note: Teams competed in separate conferences, meaning no conference championship could be contested between the teams in this sport.) | —N/a | —N/a | —N/a | —N/a | —N/a | —N/a | No meetings | —N/a | —N/a | —N/a | Tie (Note: No tiebreaker due to annual NCAA Graduation Success Rate not existing until the 2004-05 year.) | 3–3 (Note: UCF claims no games were contested between the two schools this season.) |
| 1970-71 | FTU wins | 1 | —N/a | —N/a | —N/a | —N/a | —N/a | —N/a | —N/a | —N/a | —N/a | No meetings | —N/a | —N/a | —N/a | Tie | 3–3 |
| 1970-71 | Meetings (Points per win) | 2 (3) | —N/a | —N/a | —N/a | —N/a | —N/a | —N/a | —N/a | —N/a | —N/a | No meetings | —N/a | —N/a | —N/a | Tie | 3–3 |
| 1971-72 | South Florida wins | 2 | 1 | —N/a | —N/a | —N/a | —N/a | —N/a | —N/a | —N/a | —N/a | No meetings | —N/a | —N/a | —N/a | South Florida | 12–0 (Note: UCF claims the result was 6–0 South Florida) |
| 1971-72 | FTU wins | 0 | 0 | —N/a | —N/a | —N/a | —N/a | —N/a | —N/a | —N/a | —N/a | No meetings | —N/a | —N/a | —N/a | South Florida | 12–0 |
| 1971-72 | Meetings (Points per win) | 2 (3) | 1 (6) | —N/a | —N/a | —N/a | —N/a | —N/a | —N/a | —N/a | —N/a | No meetings | —N/a | —N/a | —N/a | South Florida | 12–0 |
| 1972-73 (Note: UCF does not recognize the women's basketball results from this season.) | South Florida wins | 1 | 1 | 1 | —N/a | —N/a | —N/a | —N/a | —N/a | —N/a | —N/a | No meetings | No meetings | —N/a | —N/a | South Florida | 15–3 (Note: UCF claims the result was 9–3 South Florida.) |
| 1972-73 | FTU wins | 1 | 0 | 0 | —N/a | —N/a | —N/a | —N/a | —N/a | —N/a | —N/a | No meetings | No meetings | —N/a | —N/a | South Florida | 15–3 |
| 1972-73 | Meetings (Points per win) | 2 (3) | 1 (6) | 1 (6) | —N/a | —N/a | —N/a | —N/a | —N/a | —N/a | —N/a | No meetings | No meetings | —N/a | —N/a | South Florida | 15–3 |
| 1973-74 | South Florida wins | 2 | 1 | 0 | —N/a | —N/a | —N/a | —N/a | —N/a | —N/a | —N/a | No meetings | No meetings | —N/a | —N/a | South Florida | 12–6 (Note: UCF claims the result was 12–0 South Florida.) |
| 1973-74 | FTU wins | 0 | 0 | 2 | —N/a | —N/a | —N/a | —N/a | —N/a | —N/a | —N/a | No meetings | No meetings | —N/a | —N/a | South Florida | 12–6 |
| 1973-74 | Meetings (Points per win) | 2 (3) | 1 (6) | 2 (3) | —N/a | —N/a | —N/a | —N/a | —N/a | —N/a | —N/a | No meetings | No meetings | —N/a | —N/a | South Florida | 12–6 |
| 1974-75 (Note: UCF does not recognize the men's soccer results from this season.) (Note: UCF does not recognize the volleyball results from this season.) | South Florida wins | 1 | 1 | 2 | —N/a | —N/a | —N/a | —N/a | 1 | —N/a | —N/a | No meetings | No meetings | —N/a | 1 | South Florida | 24–6 (Note: UCF claims the result was a 6–6 tie.) |
| 1974-75 | FTU wins | 1 | 1 | 0 | —N/a | —N/a | —N/a | —N/a | 0 | —N/a | —N/a | No meetings | No meetings | —N/a | 0 | South Florida | 24–6 |
| 1974-75 | Meetings (Points per win) | 2 (3) | 2 (3) | 2 (3) | —N/a | —N/a | —N/a | —N/a | 1 (6) | —N/a | —N/a | No meetings | No meetings | —N/a | 1 (6) | South Florida | 24–6 |
| 1975-76 | South Florida wins | 2 | 1 | No meetings | —N/a | —N/a | —N/a | —N/a | 1 | —N/a | —N/a | No meetings | No meetings | —N/a | 1 | South Florida | 24–0 (Note: UCF claims the result was 18–0 South Florida.) |
| 1975-76 | FTU wins | 0 | 0 | No meetings | —N/a | —N/a | —N/a | —N/a | 0 | —N/a | —N/a | No meetings | No meetings | —N/a | 0 | South Florida | 24–0 |
| 1975-76 | Meetings (Points per win) | 2 (3) | 1 (6) | No meetings | —N/a | —N/a | —N/a | —N/a | 1 (6) | —N/a | —N/a | No meetings | No meetings | —N/a | 1 (6) | South Florida | 24–0 |
| 1976-77 | South Florida wins | 1 | 0 | 0 | —N/a | —N/a | —N/a | —N/a | 0.5 | —N/a | —N/a | No meetings | No meetings | —N/a | No meetings | FTU | 18–6 (Note: UCF claims the result was 12–6 FTU.) |
| 1976-77 | FTU wins | 1 | 1 | 1 | —N/a | —N/a | —N/a | —N/a | 0.5 | —N/a | —N/a | No meetings | No meetings | —N/a | No meetings | FTU | 18–6 |
| 1976-77 | Meetings (Points per win) | 2 (3) | 1 (6) | 1 (6) | —N/a | —N/a | —N/a | —N/a | 1 (6) | —N/a | —N/a | No meetings | No meetings | —N/a | No meetings | FTU | 18–6 |
| 1977-78 | South Florida wins | 1 | 0 | 1 | —N/a | —N/a | —N/a | —N/a | 1 | —N/a | —N/a | 2 | No meetings | —N/a | 0 | Tie | 18–18 |
| 1977-78 | FTU wins | 1 | 1 | 1 | —N/a | —N/a | —N/a | —N/a | 0 | —N/a | —N/a | 0 | No meetings | —N/a | 2 | Tie | 18–18 |
| 1977-78 | Meetings (Points per win) | 2 (3) | 1 (6) | 2 (3) | —N/a | —N/a | —N/a | —N/a | 1 (6) | —N/a | —N/a | 2 (3) | No meetings | —N/a | 2 (3) | Tie | 18–18 |
| 1978-79 | South Florida wins | 2 | 0 | 1 | —N/a | —N/a | —N/a | —N/a | No meetings | —N/a | —N/a | 2 | No meetings | —N/a | 0 | Tie | 15–15 |
| 1978-79 | FTU/UCF wins | 0 | 2 | 1 | —N/a | —N/a | —N/a | —N/a | No meetings | —N/a | —N/a | 0 | No meetings | —N/a | 3 | Tie | 15–15 |
| 1978-79 | Meetings (Points per win) | 2 (3) | 2 (3) | 2 (3) | —N/a | —N/a | —N/a | —N/a | No meetings | —N/a | —N/a | 2 (3) | No meetings | —N/a | 3 (2) | Tie | 15–15 |
| 1979-80 | South Florida wins | 0 | No meetings | 1 | —N/a | —N/a | —N/a | —N/a | 1 | —N/a | —N/a | 1 | No meetings | —N/a | 0 | UCF | 19–11 |
| 1979-80 | UCF wins | 2 | No meetings | 2 | —N/a | —N/a | —N/a | —N/a | 0 | —N/a | —N/a | 1 | No meetings | —N/a | 2 | UCF | 19–11 |
| 1979-80 | Meetings (Points per win) | 2 (3) | No meetings | 3 (2) | —N/a | —N/a | —N/a | —N/a | 1 (6) | —N/a | —N/a | 2 (3) | No meetings | —N/a | 2 (3) | UCF | 19–11 |
| 1980-81 | South Florida wins | No meetings | No meetings | 0 | —N/a | —N/a | —N/a | —N/a | 0.5 | —N/a | —N/a | 2 | No meetings | —N/a | 0 | UCF | 15–9 |
| 1980-81 | UCF wins | No meetings | No meetings | 1 | —N/a | —N/a | —N/a | —N/a | 0.5 | —N/a | —N/a | 0 | No meetings | —N/a | 1 | UCF | 15–9 |
| 1980-81 | Meetings (Points per win) | No meetings | No meetings | 1 (6) | —N/a | —N/a | —N/a | —N/a | 1 (6) | —N/a | —N/a | 2 (3) | No meetings | —N/a | 1 (6) | UCF | 15–9 |
| 1981-82 | South Florida wins | No meetings | No meetings | 1 | —N/a | —N/a | —N/a | —N/a | 1 | —N/a | —N/a | 2 | No meetings | —N/a | No meetings | South Florida | 18–0 |
| 1981-82 | UCF wins | No meetings | No meetings | 0 | —N/a | —N/a | —N/a | —N/a | 0 | —N/a | —N/a | 0 | No meetings | —N/a | No meetings | South Florida | 18–0 |
| 1981-82 | Meetings (Points per win) | No meetings | No meetings | 1 (6) | —N/a | —N/a | —N/a | —N/a | 1 (6) | —N/a | —N/a | 2 (3) | No meetings | —N/a | No meetings | South Florida | 18–0 |
| 1982-83 | South Florida wins | No meetings | No meetings' | No meetings | —N/a | —N/a | —N/a | —N/a | 0.5 | —N/a | —N/a | 1 | No meetings | —N/a | 2 | South Florida | 12–6 |
| 1982-83 | UCF wins | No meetings | No meetings' | No meetings | —N/a | —N/a | —N/a | —N/a | 0.5 | —N/a | —N/a | 0 | No meetings | —N/a | 1 | South Florida | 12–6 |
| 1982-83 | Meetings (Points per win) | No meetings | No meetings' | No meetings | —N/a | —N/a | —N/a | —N/a | 1 (6) | —N/a | —N/a | 1 (6) | No meetings | —N/a | 3 (2) | South Florida | 12–6 |
| 1983-84 | South Florida wins | No meetings | No meetings | No meetings | —N/a | —N/a | —N/a | —N/a | 1 | —N/a | —N/a | 1 | No meetings | —N/a | 0 | South Florida | 12–6 |
| 1983-84 | UCF wins | No meetings | No meetings | No meetings | —N/a | —N/a | —N/a | —N/a | 0 | —N/a | —N/a | 0 | No meetings | —N/a | 2 | South Florida | 12–6 |
| 1983-84 | Meetings (Points per win) | No meetings | No meetings | No meetings | —N/a | —N/a | —N/a | —N/a | 1 (6) | —N/a | —N/a | 1 (6) | No meetings | —N/a | 2 (3) | South Florida | 12–6 |
| 1984-85 | South Florida wins | 4 | No meetings | No meetings | —N/a | —N/a | —N/a | —N/a | 0.5 | —N/a | —N/a | 1 | No meetings | —N/a | 2 | South Florida | 21–3 |
| 1984-85 | UCF wins | 0 | No meetings | No meetings | —N/a | —N/a | —N/a | —N/a | 0.5 | —N/a | —N/a | 0 | No meetings | —N/a | 0 | South Florida | 21–3 |
| 1984-85 | Meetings (Points per win) | 4 (1.5) | No meetings | No meetings | —N/a | —N/a | —N/a | —N/a | 1 (6) | —N/a | —N/a | 1 (6) | No meetings | —N/a | 2 (3) | South Florida | 21–3 |
| 1985-86 | South Florida wins | 1 | 1 | No meetings | —N/a | —N/a | —N/a | —N/a | 1 | —N/a | —N/a | 1 | No meetings | —N/a | 2 | South Florida | 27–3 |
| 1985-86 | UCF wins | 1 | 0 | No meetings | —N/a | —N/a | —N/a | —N/a | 0 | —N/a | —N/a | 0 | No meetings | —N/a | 0 | South Florida | 27–3 |
| 1985-86 | Meetings (Points per win) | 2 (3) | 1 (6) | No meetings | —N/a | —N/a | —N/a | —N/a | 1 (6) | —N/a | —N/a | 1 (6) | No meetings | —N/a | 2 (3) | South Florida | 27–3 |
| 1986-87 | South Florida wins | 2 | 1 | 1 | —N/a | —N/a | —N/a | —N/a | No meetings | —N/a | —N/a | No meetings | No meetings | —N/a | 4 | South Florida | 24–0 |
| 1986-87 | UCF wins | 0 | 0 | 0 | —N/a | —N/a | —N/a | —N/a | No meetings | —N/a | —N/a | No meetings | No meetings | —N/a | 0 | South Florida | 24–0 |
| 1986-87 | Meetings (Points per win) | 2 (3) | 1 (6) | 1 (6) | —N/a | —N/a | —N/a | —N/a | No meetings | —N/a | —N/a | No meetings | No meetings | —N/a | 4 (1.5) | South Florida | 24–0 |
| 1987-88 | South Florida wins | 0 | No meetings | 2 | —N/a | —N/a | —N/a | —N/a | 0 | —N/a | —N/a | No meetings | No meetings | —N/a | 1 | Tie | 12–12 |
| 1987-88 | UCF wins | 2 | No meetings | 0 | —N/a | —N/a | —N/a | —N/a | 1 | —N/a | —N/a | No meetings | No meetings | —N/a | 0 | Tie | 12–12 |
| 1987-88 | Meetings (Points per win) | 2 (3) | No meetings | 2 (3) | —N/a | —N/a | —N/a | —N/a | 1 (6) | —N/a | —N/a | No meetings | No meetings | —N/a | 1 (6) | Tie | 12–12 |
| 1988-89 | South Florida wins | 0 | No meetings | 1 | —N/a | —N/a | —N/a | —N/a | 0 | —N/a | —N/a | No meetings | No meetings | —N/a | 2 | Tie | 12–12 |
| 1988-89 | UCF wins | 2 | No meetings | 0 | —N/a | —N/a | —N/a | —N/a | 1 | —N/a | —N/a | No meetings | No meetings | —N/a | 0 | Tie | 12–12 |
| 1988-89 | Meetings (Points per win) | 2 (3) | No meetings | 1 (6) | —N/a | —N/a | —N/a | —N/a | 1 (6) | —N/a | —N/a | No meetings | No meetings | —N/a | 2 (3) | Tie | 12–12 |
| 1989-90 | South Florida wins | 1 | No meetings | No meetings | —N/a | —N/a | —N/a | —N/a | 1 | —N/a | —N/a | No meetings | No meetings | —N/a | 1 | South Florida | 15–3 |
| 1989-90 | UCF wins | 1 | No meetings | No meetings | —N/a | —N/a | —N/a | —N/a | 0 | —N/a | —N/a | No meetings | No meetings | —N/a | 0 | South Florida | 15–3 |
| 1989-90 | Meetings (Points per win) | 2 (3) | No meetings | No meetings | —N/a | —N/a | —N/a | —N/a | 1 (6) | —N/a | —N/a | No meetings | No meetings | —N/a | 1 (6) | South Florida | 15–3 |
| 1990-91 | South Florida wins | 2 | No meetings | No meetings | —N/a | —N/a | —N/a | —N/a | 1 | —N/a | —N/a | No meetings | No meetings | —N/a | 2 | South Florida | 18–0 |
| 1990-91 | UCF wins | 0 | No meetings | No meetings | —N/a | —N/a | —N/a | —N/a | 0 | —N/a | —N/a | No meetings | No meetings | —N/a | 0 | South Florida | 18–0 |
| 1990-91 | Meetings (Points per win) | 2 (3) | No meetings | No meetings | —N/a | —N/a | —N/a | —N/a | 1 (6) | —N/a | —N/a | No meetings | No meetings | —N/a | 2 (3) | South Florida | 18–0 |
| 1991-92 | South Florida wins | 1 | No meetings | 1 | —N/a | —N/a | —N/a | —N/a | 1 | —N/a | —N/a | No meetings | No meetings | —N/a | 1 | South Florida | 18–6 |
| 1991-92 | UCF wins | 1 | No meetings | 0 | —N/a | —N/a | —N/a | —N/a | 0 | —N/a | —N/a | No meetings | No meetings | —N/a | 1 | South Florida | 18–6 |
| 1991-92 | Meetings (Points per win) | 2 (3) | No meetings | 1 (6) | —N/a | —N/a | —N/a | —N/a | 1 (6) | —N/a | —N/a | No meetings | No meetings | —N/a | 2 (3) | South Florida | 18–6 |
| 1992-93 | South Florida wins | 2 | 1 | 2 | —N/a | —N/a | —N/a | —N/a | 1 | —N/a | —N/a | 1 | No meetings | —N/a | 2 | South Florida | 30–6 |
| 1992-93 | UCF wins | 2 | 1 | 0 | —N/a | —N/a | —N/a | —N/a | 0 | —N/a | —N/a | 0 | No meetings | —N/a | 0 | South Florida | 30–6 |
| 1992-93 | Meetings (Points per win) | 4 (1.5) | 2 (3) | 2 (3) | —N/a | —N/a | —N/a | —N/a | 1 (6) | —N/a | —N/a | 1 (6) | No meetings | —N/a | 2 (3) | South Florida | 30–6 |
| 1993-94 | South Florida wins | 2 | 0 | 1 | —N/a | —N/a | —N/a | —N/a | 1 | —N/a | —N/a | 1 | 1 | —N/a | 2 | South Florida | 33–9 |
| 1993-94 | UCF wins | 2 | 1 | 0 | —N/a | —N/a | —N/a | —N/a | 0 | —N/a | —N/a | 0 | 0 | —N/a | 0 | South Florida | 33–9 |
| 1993-94 | Meetings (Points per win) | 4 (1.5) | 1 (6) | 1 (6) | —N/a | —N/a | —N/a | —N/a | 1 (6) | —N/a | —N/a | 1 (6) | 1 (6) | —N/a | 2 (3) | South Florida | 33–9 |
| 1994-95 | South Florida wins | 0 | 1 | No meetings | —N/a | —N/a | —N/a | —N/a | 1 | —N/a | —N/a | 1 | 1 | —N/a | 1 | South Florida | 27–9 |
| 1994-95 | UCF wins | 4 | 0 | No meetings | —N/a | —N/a | —N/a | —N/a | 0 | —N/a | —N/a | 0 | 0 | —N/a | 1 | South Florida | 27–9 |
| 1994-95 | Meetings (Points per win) | 4 (1.5) | 1 (6) | No meetings | —N/a | —N/a | —N/a | —N/a | 1 (6) | —N/a | —N/a | 1 (6) | 1 (6) | —N/a | 2 (3) | South Florida | 27–9 |
| 1995-96 | South Florida wins | 1 | 1 | No meetings | —N/a | —N/a | —N/a | —N/a | No meetings | No meetings | —N/a | 1 | 1 | —N/a | 2 | South Florida | 25.5–4.5 |
| 1995-96 | UCF wins | 3 | 0 | No meetings | —N/a | —N/a | —N/a | —N/a | No meetings | No meetings | —N/a | 0 | 0 | —N/a | 0 | South Florida | 25.5–4.5 |
| 1995-96 | Meetings (Points per win) | 4 (1.5) | 1 (6) | No meetings | —N/a | —N/a | —N/a | —N/a | No meetings | No meetings | —N/a | 1 (6) | 1 (6) | —N/a | 2 (3) | South Florida | 25.5–4.5 |
| 1996-97 | South Florida wins | 1 | 1 | 1 | —N/a | —N/a | —N/a | —N/a | No meetings | No meetings | —N/a | 0 | 1 | —N/a | 1 | South Florida | 22.5–13.5 |
| 1996-97 | UCF wins | 3 | 0 | 0 | —N/a | —N/a | —N/a | —N/a | No meetings | No meetings | —N/a | 1 | 0 | —N/a | 1 | South Florida | 22.5–13.5 |
| 1996-97 | Meetings (Points per win) | 4 (1.5) | 1 (6) | 1 (6) | —N/a | —N/a | —N/a | —N/a | No meetings | No meetings | —N/a | 1 (6) | 1 (6) | —N/a | 2 (3) | South Florida | 22.5–13.5 |
| 1997-98 | South Florida wins | 1 | 1 | No meetings | —N/a | No meetings | —N/a | —N/a | No meetings | No meetings | —N/a | 1 | 1 | —N/a | 1 | South Florida | 25.5–4.5 |
| 1997-98 | UCF wins | 3 | 0 | No meetings | —N/a | No meetings | —N/a | —N/a | No meetings | No meetings | —N/a | 0 | 0 | —N/a | 0 | South Florida | 25.5–4.5 |
| 1997-98 | Meetings (Points per win) | 4 (1.5) | 1 (6) | No meetings | —N/a | No meetings | —N/a | —N/a | No meetings | No meetings | —N/a | 1 (6) | 1 (6) | —N/a | 1 (6) | South Florida | 25.5–4.5 |
| 1998-99 | South Florida wins | 1 | 1 | No meetings | —N/a | No meetings | —N/a | —N/a | 1 | 1 | —N/a | 1 | 1 | —N/a | 2 | South Florida | 37.5–4.5 |
| 1998-99 | UCF wins | 3 | 0 | No meetings | —N/a | No meetings | —N/a | —N/a | 0 | 0 | —N/a | 0 | 0 | —N/a | 0 | South Florida | 37.5–4.5 |
| 1998-99 | Meetings (Points per win) | 4 (1.5) | 1 (6) | No meetings | —N/a | No meetings | —N/a | —N/a | 1 (6) | 1 (6) | —N/a | 1 (6) | 1 (6) | —N/a | 2 (3) | South Florida | 37.5–4.5 |
| 1999-2000 | South Florida wins | 2 | 1 | 1 | —N/a | No meetings | —N/a | —N/a | 1 | No meetings | —N/a | 1 | 1 | —N/a | 2 | South Florida | 39–3 |
| 1999-2000 | UCF wins | 2 | 0 | 0 | —N/a | No meetings | —N/a | —N/a | 0 | No meetings | —N/a | 0 | 0 | —N/a | 0 | South Florida | 39–3 |
| 1999-2000 | Meetings (Points per win) | 4 (1.5) | 1 (6) | 1 (6) | —N/a | No meetings | —N/a | —N/a | 1 (6) | No meetings | —N/a | 1 (6) | 1 (6) | —N/a | 2 (3) | South Florida | 39–3 |
| 2000-01 | South Florida wins | 2 | 1 | 1 | —N/a | No meetings | —N/a | —N/a | 1 | No meetings | —N/a | 1 | 1 | —N/a | 2 | South Florida | 39–3 |
| 2000-01 | UCF wins | 2 | 0 | 0 | —N/a | No meetings | —N/a | —N/a | 0 | No meetings | —N/a | 0 | 0 | —N/a | 0 | South Florida | 39–3 |
| 2000-01 | Meetings (Points per win) | 4 (1.5) | 1 (6) | 1 (6) | —N/a | No meetings | —N/a | —N/a | 1 (6) | No meetings | —N/a | 1 (6) | 1 (6) | —N/a | 2 (3) | South Florida | 39–3 |
| 2001-02 | South Florida wins | 2 | 1 | No meetings | —N/a | No meetings | —N/a | —N/a | 0 | 0 | No meetings | No meetings | 0 | —N/a | 1 | UCF | 23–13 |
| 2001-02 | UCF wins | 1 | 0 | No meetings | —N/a | No meetings | —N/a | —N/a | 1 | 1 | No meetings | No meetings | 1 | —N/a | 1 | UCF | 23–13 |
| 2001-02 | Meetings (Points per win) | 3 (2) | 1 (6) | No meetings | —N/a | No meetings | —N/a | —N/a | 1 (6) | 1 (6) | No meetings | No meetings | 1 (6) | —N/a | 2 (3) | UCF | 23–13 |
| 2002-03 | South Florida wins | 2 | No meetings | No meetings | —N/a | No meetings | —N/a | —N/a | 1 | No meetings | 2 | 1 | 0 | —N/a | 1 | South Florida | 28–8 |
| 2002-03 | UCF wins | 1 | No meetings | No meetings | —N/a | No meetings | —N/a | —N/a | 0 | No meetings | 0 | 0 | 1 | —N/a | 0 | South Florida | 28–8 |
| 2002-03 | Meetings (Points per win) | 3 (2) | No meetings | No meetings | —N/a | No meetings | —N/a | —N/a | 1 (6) | No meetings | 2 (3) | 1 (6) | 1 (6) | —N/a | 1 (6) | South Florida | 28–8 |
| 2003-04 | South Florida wins | 2 | No meetings | No meetings | —N/a | No meetings | —N/a | —N/a | No meetings | 0 | 2 | 0 | 0 | —N/a | 0 | UCF | 26–10 |
| 2003-04 | UCF wins | 1 | No meetings | No meetings | —N/a | No meetings | —N/a | —N/a | No meetings | 1 | 0 | 1 | 1 | —N/a | 1 | UCF | 26–10 |
| 2003-04 | Meetings (Points per win) | 3 (2) | No meetings | No meetings | —N/a | No meetings | —N/a | —N/a | No meetings | 1 (6) | 2 (3) | 1 (6) | 1 (6) | —N/a | 1 (6) | UCF | 26–10 |
| 2004-05 | South Florida wins | 1 | No meetings | No meetings | —N/a | No meetings | —N/a | —N/a | No meetings | 0 | 2 | 1 | 0 | —N/a | 0 | UCF | 22–14 |
| 2004-05 | UCF wins | 2 | No meetings | No meetings | —N/a | No meetings | —N/a | —N/a | No meetings | 1 | 0 | 0 | 1 | —N/a | 1 | UCF | 22–14 |
| 2004-05 | Meetings (Points per win) | 3 (2) | No meetings | No meetings | —N/a | No meetings | —N/a | —N/a | No meetings | 1 (6) | 2 (3) | 1 (6) | 1 (6) | —N/a | 1 (6) | UCF | 22–14 |
| 2005-06 | South Florida wins | 2 | No meetings | No meetings | —N/a | 1 | —N/a | —N/a | No meetings | No meetings | 0 | 1 | 1 | —N/a | 1 | South Florida | 28–8 |
| 2005-06 | UCF wins | 1 | No meetings | No meetings | —N/a | 0 | —N/a | —N/a | No meetings | No meetings | 1 | 0 | 0 | —N/a | 0 | South Florida | 28–8 |
| 2005-06 | Meetings (Points per win) | 3 (2) | No meetings | No meetings | —N/a | 1 (6) | —N/a | —N/a | No meetings | No meetings | 1 (6) | 1 (6) | 1 (6) | —N/a | 1 (6) | South Florida | 28–8 |
| 2006-07 | South Florida wins | 2 | No meetings | No meetings | —N/a | 1 | —N/a | —N/a | No meetings | No meetings | No meetings | 0 | 1 | —N/a | 0 | South Florida | 16–14 |
| 2006-07 | UCF wins | 1 | No meetings | No meetings | —N/a | 0 | —N/a | —N/a | No meetings | No meetings | No meetings | 1 | 0 | —N/a | 1 | South Florida | 16–14 |
| 2006-07 | Meetings (Points per win) | 3 (2) | No meetings | No meetings | —N/a | 1 (6) | —N/a | —N/a | No meetings | No meetings | No meetings | 1 (6) | 1 (6) | —N/a | 1 (6) | South Florida | 16–14 |
| 2007-08 | South Florida wins | 2 | 1 | No meetings | —N/a | 1 | —N/a | —N/a | 1 | No meetings | No meetings | 1 | 1 | —N/a | 1 | South Florida | 39–3 |
| 2007-08 | UCF wins | 2 | 0 | No meetings | —N/a | 0 | —N/a | —N/a | 0 | No meetings | No meetings | 0 | 0 | —N/a | 0 | South Florida | 39–3 |
| 2007-08 | Meetings (Points per win) | 4 (1.5) | 1 (6) | No meetings | —N/a | 1 (6) | —N/a | —N/a | 1 (6) | No meetings | No meetings | 1 (6) | 1 (6) | —N/a | 1 (6) | South Florida | 39–3 |
| 2008-09 | South Florida wins | 3 | 0 | No meetings | —N/a | 1 | —N/a | —N/a | 1 | No meetings | No meetings | 1 | 1 | —N/a | No meetings | South Florida | 28.5-1.5 (Note: 6 points vacated by UCF.) |
| 2008-09 | UCF wins | 1 | ~~1~~ (Note: UCF forced to vacate men's basketball win due to NCAA sanctions) | No meetings | —N/a | 0 | —N/a | —N/a | 0 | No meetings | No meetings | 0 | 0 | —N/a | No meetings | South Florida | 28.5-1.5 |
| 2008-09 | Meetings (Points per win) | 4 (1.5) | 1 (6) | No meetings | —N/a | 1 (6) | —N/a | —N/a | 1 (6) | No meetings | No meetings | 1 (6) | 1 (6) | —N/a | No meetings | South Florida | 28.5-1.5 |
| 2009-10 | South Florida wins | 1 | 1 | No meetings | —N/a | No meetings | —N/a | —N/a | 1 | 0 | No meetings | 0 | No meetings | —N/a | 1 | UCF | 19–18 (Note: UCF wins 80-72 on Graduation Success Rate tiebreaker.) |
| 2009-10 | UCF wins | 1 | 0 | No meetings | —N/a | No meetings | —N/a | —N/a | 0 | 1 | No meetings | 1 | No meetings | —N/a | 1 | UCF | 19–18 |
| 2009-10 | Meetings (Points per win) | 2 (3) | 1 (6) | No meetings | —N/a | No meetings | —N/a | —N/a | 1 (6) | 1 (6) | No meetings | 1 (6) | No meetings | —N/a | 2 (3) | UCF | 19–18 |
| 2010-11 | South Florida wins | 1 | 0 | No meetings | —N/a | No meetings | —N/a | —N/a | No meetings | 0 | No meetings | 1 | No meetings | —N/a | No meetings | Tie (Note: No tiebreaker due to tie being caused by 6 points being vacated by UCF.) | 9-9 |
| 2010-11 | UCF wins | 1 | ~~1~~ | No meetings | —N/a | No meetings | —N/a | —N/a | No meetings | 1 | No meetings | 0 | No meetings | —N/a | No meetings | Tie | 9-9 |
| 2010-11 | Meetings (Points per win) | 2 (3) | 1 (6) | No meetings | —N/a | No meetings | —N/a | —N/a | No meetings | 1 (6) | No meetings | 1 (6) | No meetings | —N/a | No meetings | Tie | 9-9 |
| 2011-12 | South Florida wins | 0 | No meetings | No meetings | —N/a | No meetings | —N/a | —N/a | No meetings | 0 | No meetings | 1 | 1 | —N/a | No meetings | UCF | 13–12 (Note: UCF wins 85-77 on Graduation Success Rate tiebreaker.) |
| 2011-12 | UCF wins | 2 | No meetings | No meetings | —N/a | No meetings | —N/a | —N/a | No meetings | 1 | No meetings | 0 | 0 | —N/a | No meetings | UCF | 13–12 |
| 2011-12 | Meetings (Points per win) | 2 (3) | No meetings | No meetings | —N/a | No meetings | —N/a | —N/a | No meetings | 1 (6) | No meetings | 1 (6) | 1 (6) | —N/a | No meetings | UCF | 13–12 |
| 2012-13 | South Florida wins | 2 | 1 | No meetings | —N/a | No meetings | —N/a | —N/a | No meetings | 0 | No meetings | 1 | 1 | —N/a | No meetings | South Florida | 21–9 |
| 2012-13 | UCF wins | 0 | 1 | No meetings | —N/a | No meetings | —N/a | —N/a | No meetings | 1 | No meetings | 0 | 0 | —N/a | No meetings | South Florida | 21–9 |
| 2012-13 | Meetings (Points per win) | 2 (3) | 2 (3) | No meetings | —N/a | No meetings | —N/a | —N/a | No meetings | 1 (6) | No meetings | 1 (6) | 1 (6) | —N/a | No meetings | South Florida | 21–9 |
| 2013-14 | South Florida wins | 1 | 1 | 2 | 0 | 0 | 0 | 0 | 0 | 0 | 1 | 1 | 1 | 0 | 0 | UCF | 59–25 |
| 2013-14 | UCF wins | 2 | 1 | 0 | 1 | 1 | 1 | 1 | 1 | 1 | 2 | 0 | 0 | 2 | 2 | UCF | 59–25 |
| 2013-14 | Meetings (Points per win) | 3 (2) | 2 (3) | 2 (3) | 1 (6) | 1 (6) | 1 (6) | 1 (6) | 1 (6) | 1 (6) | 3 (2) | 1 (6) | 1 (6) | 2 (3) | 2 (3) | UCF | 59–25 |
| 2014-15 | South Florida wins | 3 | 1 | 2 | 0 | 0 | 1 | 0 | 1 | 0 | 1 | 1 | 1 | 0 | 0 | UCF | 46–38 |
| 2014-15 | UCF wins | 3 | 1 | 0 | 1 | 1 | 0 | 1 | 0 | 1 | 2 | 0 | 0 | 2 | 2 | UCF | 46–38 |
| 2014-15 | Meetings (Points per win) | 6 (1) | 2 (3) | 2 (3) | 1 (6) | 1 (6) | 1 (6) | 1 (6) | 1 (6) | 1 (6) | 3 (2) | 1 (6) | 1 (6) | 2 (3) | 2 (3) | UCF | 46–38 |
| 2015-16 | South Florida wins | 3 | 0 | 2 | 1 | 1 | 1 | 1 | 1 | 0 | 1 | 1 | 1 | 0 | 0 | South Florida | 53–31 |
| 2015-16 | UCF wins | 3 | 2 | 0 | 0 | 0 | 0 | 0 | 0 | 1 | 2 | 0 | 0 | 2 | 2 | South Florida | 53–31 |
| 2015-16 | Meetings (Points per win) | 6 (1) | 2 (3) | 2 (3) | 1 (6) | 1 (6) | 1 (6) | 1 (6) | 1 (6) | 1 (6) | 3 (2) | 1 (6) | 1 (6) | 2 (3) | 2 (3) | South Florida | 53–31 |
| 2016-17 | South Florida wins | 4 | 0 | 0 | 0 | 1 | 1 | 0 | 1 | 0.5 | 1 | 0 | 1 | 0 | 0 | UCF | 51–33 |
| 2016-17 | UCF wins | 2 | 2 | 1 | 1 | 0 | 0 | 1 | 0 | 0.5 | 2 | 1 | 0 | 2 | 2 | UCF | 51–33 |
| 2016-17 | Meetings (Points per win) | 6 (1) | 2 (3) | 1 (6) | 1 (6) | 1 (6) | 1 (6) | 1 (6) | 1 (6) | 1 (6) | 3 (2) | 1 (6) | 1 (6) | 2 (3) | 2 (3) | UCF | 51–33 |
| 2017-18 | South Florida wins | 2 | 0 | 2 | 0 | 0 | 1 | 0 | 1 | 0.5 | 2 | 1 | 0 | 0 | 0 | UCF | 49–35 |
| 2017-18 | UCF wins | 1 | 2 | 0 | 1 | 1 | 0 | 1 | 0 | 0.5 | 1 | 0 | 1 | 2 | 2 | UCF | 49–35 |
| 2017-18 | Meetings (Points per win) | 3 (2) | 2 (3) | 2 (3) | 1 (6) | 1 (6) | 1 (6) | 1 (6) | 1 (6) | 1 (6) | 3 (2) | 1 (6) | 1 (6) | 2 (3) | 2 (3) | UCF | 49–35 |
| 2018-19 | South Florida wins | 1 | 0 | 0 | 0 | 0 | 0 | 0 | 0 | 1 | 3 | 0 | 0 | 0 | 0 | UCF | 70–14 |
| 2018-19 | UCF wins | 2 | 2 | 2 | 1 | 1 | 1 | 1 | 1 | 0 | 0 | 1 | 1 | 2 | 2 | UCF | 70–14 |
| 2018-19 | Meetings (Points per win) | 3 (2) | 2 (3) | 2 (3) | 1 (6) | 1 (6) | 1 (6) | 1 (6) | 1 (6) | 1 (6) | 3 (2) | 1 (6) | 1 (6) | 2 (3) | 2 (3) | UCF | 70–14 |
| 2019-20 (Note: One of the intended Women's Track & Field meetings, along with all of the intended Baseball, Men's Golf, Women's Golf, Softball, Men's Tennis, and Women's Tennis meetings were canceled due to the COVID-19 pandemic.) | South Florida wins | 0 | 1 | 0 | 1 | 0 | 0 | 0 | 0 | 0 | 0 | 0 | 0 | 0 | 0 | UCF | 36–9 |
| 2019-20 | UCF wins | 0 | 1 | 2 | 0 | 1 | 0 | 0 | 1 | 1 | 0 | 0 | 0 | 1 | 2 | UCF | 36–9 |
| 2019-20 | Meetings (Points per win) | 3 (2) | 2 (3) | 2 (3) | 1 (6) | 1 (6) | 1 (6) | 1 (6) | 1 (6) | 1 (6) | 3 (2) | 1 (6) | 1 (6) | 2 (3) | 2 (3) | UCF | 36–9 |
| 2020-21 | South Florida wins | 3 | 1 | 1 | 0 | 0 | 1 | 0 | 1 | 1 | 1 | 0 | 0 | 0 | 0 | UCF | 59.25–24.75 |
| 2020-21 | UCF wins | 5 | 1 | 1 | 1 | 1 | 0 | 1 | 1 | 0 | 3 | 2 | 1 | 1 | 2 | UCF | 59.25–24.75 |
| 2020-21 | Meetings (Points per win) | 8 (0.75) | 2 (3) | 2 (3) | 1 (6) | 1 (6) | 1 (6) | 1 (6) | 2 (3) | 1 (6) | 4 (1.5) | 2 (3) | 1 (6) | 1 (6) | 2 (3) | UCF | 59.25–24.75 |
| 2021-22 | South Florida wins | 2 | 1 | 0 | 0 | 0 | 1 | 0 | 1 | 1 | 0 | 1 | 0 | 0 | 0 | UCF | 58–26 |
| 2021-22 | UCF wins | 4 | 1 | 2 | 1 | 1 | 0 | 1 | 1 | 0 | 3 | 0 | 1 | 2 | 2 | UCF | 58–26 |
| 2021-22 | Meetings (Points per win) | 6 (1) | 2 (3) | 2 (3) | 1 (6) | 1 (6) | 1 (6) | 1 (6) | 2 (3) | 1 (6) | 3 (2) | 1 (6) | 1 (6) | 2 (3) | 2 (3) | UCF | 58–26 |
| 2022-23 | South Florida wins | 3 | 2 | 2 | 0 | 0 | 0 | 0 | 1 | 0 | 0 | 0 | 0 | 0 | 0 | UCF | 63–21 |
| 2022-23 | UCF wins | 3 | 0 | 0 | 1 | 1 | 1 | 1 | 0 | 1 | 3 | 1 | 1 | 2 | 2 | UCF | 63–21 |
| 2022-23 | Meetings (Points per win) | 6 (1) | 2 (3) | 2 (3) | 1 (6) | 1 (6) | 1 (6) | 1 (6) | 1 (6) | 1 (6) | 3 (2) | 1 (6) | 1 (6) | 2 (3) | 2 (3) | UCF | 63–21 |
| 2023-24 (Note: It is unknown if the trophy was officially awarded to the winning team this season or not.) | South Florida wins | 1 | No meetings | No meetings | —N/a | No meetings | —N/a | —N/a | No meetings (Note: The schools played in a preseason exhibition match in Tampa, which South Florida won 2–0.) | 0 | No meetings | 0 | No meetings | —N/a | No meetings | UCF | 16–2 |
| 2023-24 | UCF wins | 2 | No meetings | No meetings | —N/a | No meetings | —N/a | —N/a | No meetings | 1 | No meetings | 1 | No meetings | —N/a | No meetings | UCF | 16–2 |
| 2023-24 | Meetings (Points per win) | 3 (2) | No meetings | No meetings | —N/a | No meetings | —N/a | —N/a | No meetings | 1 (6) | No meetings | 1 (6) | No meetings | —N/a | No meetings | UCF | 16–2 |
| 2024-25 | South Florida wins | 1 | No meetings | No meetings | —N/a | No meetings | —N/a | —N/a | 0.5 | 1 | No meetings | 1 | 0 | —N/a | No meetings | UCF | 16–14 |
| 2024-25 | UCF wins | 2 | No meetings | No meetings | —N/a | No meetings | —N/a | —N/a | 0.5 | 0 | No meetings | 1 | 1 | —N/a | No meetings | UCF | 16–14 |
| 2024-25 | Meetings (Points per win) | 3 (2) | No meetings | No meetings | —N/a | No meetings | —N/a | —N/a | 1 (6) | 1 (6) | No meetings | 2 (3) | 1 (6) | —N/a | No meetings | UCF | 16–14 |
| 2025-26 | South Florida wins | 2 | No meetings | No meetings | —N/a | No meetings | —N/a | —N/a | 0.5 | 0 | No meetings | 0 | 0 | —N/a | No meetings (Note: The schools played in a preseason exhibition match in Orlando, which UCF won 3–2.) | UCF | 23–7 |
| 2025-26 | UCF wins | 1 | No meetings | No meetings | —N/a | No meetings | —N/a | —N/a | 0.5 | 1 | No meetings | 2 | 1 | —N/a | No meetings | UCF | 23–7 |
| 2025-26 | Meetings (Points per win) | 3 (2) | No meetings | No meetings | —N/a | No meetings | —N/a | —N/a | 1 (6) | 1 (6) | No meetings | 2 (3) | 1 (6) | —N/a | No meetings | UCF | 23–7 |
| 2026-27 | South Florida wins | 0 | No meetings | No meetings | —N/a | No meetings | —N/a | —N/a | 0 | 0 | 0 | 0 | 0 | —N/a | No meetings (Note: The schools played in a preseason exhibition match in Tampa, which UCF won 3–2.) | Ongoing | UCF leads 12–0 |
| 2026-27 | UCF wins | 0 | No meetings | No meetings | —N/a | No meetings | —N/a | —N/a | 1 | 1 | 0 | 0 | 0 | —N/a | No meetings | Ongoing | UCF leads 12–0 |
| 2026-27 | Meetings (Points per win) | TBD | No meetings | No meetings | —N/a | No meetings | —N/a | —N/a | 1 (6) | 1 (6) | TBD | TBD | TBD | —N/a | No meetings | Ongoing | UCF leads 12–0 |
| Season | | Baseball | Men's Basketball | Women's Basketball | Women's Cross Country | Football | Men's Golf | Women's Golf | Men's Soccer | Women's Soccer | Softball | Men's Tennis | Women's Tennis | Women's Track & Field | Volleyball | Winner | Score |

== Football ==
War on I–4: Football
- Sport: Football
- First meeting: September 17, 2005; South Florida 31, UCF 14
- Latest meeting: November 26, 2022; UCF 46, South Florida 39
- Stadiums: South Florida: Raymond James Stadium; UCF: FBC Mortgage Stadium

Statistics
- Total meetings: 14
- All-time series: UCF leads 8–6
- Largest victory: South Florida, 64–12 (2007)
- Longest win streak: UCF, 6 (2017–present)
- Current win streak: UCF, 6 (2017–present)

=== History ===
==== Early plans ====
Discussions about scheduling a game between the Knights and Bulls began shortly after South Florida fielded its first NCAA Division I-AA team in 1997. Supporters suggested such a rivalry could help generate interest and revenue for both burgeoning teams. The prospect became more serious when the Bulls entered Division I-A in 2001 and was very popular among fans, but as it would be a non-conference series, difficulties arose. UCF had overbooked its future schedules and would have to break commitments. Meanwhile, South Florida officials worried that their young program stood to take in less revenue from a home-and-away series against UCF than it would with an additional home game on the schedule. Serious planning for a series did not commence until 2003.

==== First games (2005–2008) ====
By 2003, serious discussions resumed as both schools had joined conferences – South Florida joined Conference USA (C-USA) in 2001, while UCF joined the Mid-American Conference (MAC) in 2002. That year, the schools' athletics directors met and agreed to schedule games for the 2005 and 2006 seasons. Subsequently, South Florida joined the Big East, an Automatic Qualifying conference, in 2005, while UCF joined C-USA the same year. The Bulls won both games, which both drew crowds over 45,000. The series was extended for 2007 and 2008 as part of an agreement with C-USA that the Bulls play a member of the conference annually for five years. South Florida won these games as well, with a 64–12 blowout in 2007 and 31–24 overtime thriller in 2008. South Florida declined to schedule further games in the series, indicating it wished to pursue more competitive and high-profile opponents. During the series hiatus South Florida would go on to play opponents such as Florida, Florida State, Miami, Clemson, and Notre Dame; beating all except for Florida at least once.

The two schools discussed scheduling more games over the next several years, including a failed proposal by South Florida to play at the Citrus Bowl in 2011. In addition, a possible head-to-head matchup at the 2009 St. Petersburg Bowl failed to materialize. Bowl and city officials decided against pitting the two nearby schools, as they preferred at least one distant team so that more out of town fans would book hotel rooms in the area. UCF instead faced Rutgers in the game.

==== Renewed series (2013–present) ====
UCF was admitted to join South Florida in the Big East Conference in 2011 and was set to begin playing there in the 2013–2014 school year. Conference realignment turned the Big East into the American Athletic Conference prior to the fall 2013 season. For the first time, both schools were part of the same conference, and the rivalry resumed as a regular conference match beginning with the 2013 season.

Since 2013, the games have been scheduled for Thanksgiving weekend. In 2015, the game was played on Thanksgiving night, and in 2016, the game was played on the Saturday of that week, which happened again for the 2022 meeting. However, in most years it has been scheduled for Black Friday, the day after Thanksgiving.

The 2022 football game was the last game scheduled between the teams because UCF left the American for the Big 12 Conference starting in 2023. As of now, no future games have been scheduled.

=== Game results ===
Since 2005, the Bulls and Knights have played fourteen times. The Knights lead the series, 8–6. The game has been played in two cities and three stadiums: Raymond James Stadium in Tampa, Florida, and Camping World Stadium and FBC Mortgage Stadium in Orlando, Florida. UCF holds an 8–2 series lead in conference games against South Florida.

| South Florida victories | UCF victories |

| No. | Date | Location | Winner | Score |
|---|---|---|---|---|
| 1 | September 17, 2005 | Tampa, FL | South Florida | 31–14 |
| 2 | September 16, 2006 | Orlando, FL | South Florida | 24–17 |
| 3 | October 6, 2007 | Tampa, FL | #5 South Florida | 64–12 |
| 4 | September 6, 2008 | Orlando, FL | #17 South Florida | 31–24^{OT} |
| 5 | November 29, 2013 | Orlando, FL | #19 UCF | 23–20 |
| 6 | November 28, 2014 | Tampa, FL | UCF | 16–0 |
| 7 | November 26, 2015 | Orlando, FL | South Florida | 44–3 |
| 8 | November 26, 2016 | Tampa, FL | South Florida | 48–31 |
| 9 | November 24, 2017 | Orlando, FL | #15 UCF | 49–42 |
| 10 | November 23, 2018 | Tampa, FL | #9 UCF | 38–10 |
| 11 | November 29, 2019 | Orlando, FL | UCF | 34–7 |
| 12 | November 27, 2020 | Tampa, FL | UCF | 58–46 |
| 13 | November 26, 2021 | Orlando, FL | UCF | 17–13 |
| 14 | November 26, 2022 | Tampa, FL | #22 UCF | 46–39 |
Series: UCF leads 8–6

Bold dates indicate conference games
Italic dates indicate games that count toward the trophy series

== Men's Basketball ==
War on I–4: Men's Basketball
- Sport: Men's basketball
- First meeting: February 22, 1972; South Florida 115, FTU 96
- Latest meeting: March 19, 2024; South Florida 83, UCF 77
- Stadiums: South Florida: Yuengling Center; UCF: Addition Financial Arena

Statistics
- Total meetings: 49
- All-time series: South Florida leads 28–19 (Note: This record does not include two UCF victories which were vacated due to NCAA sanctions)
- Largest victory: South Florida, 120–87 (1975)
- Longest win streak: South Florida, 9 (1994–2007); UCF, 9 (2016–2020)
- Current win streak: South Florida, 3

The two schools began competing against one another in men's basketball during the 1971–72 season and have met 48 times to date. The Bulls currently hold a 28–19 edge over the Knights, however two Knights' victories were vacated due to NCAA sanctions, and UCF holds a 14–7 series lead since both teams joined the American Athletic Conference. South Florida and UCF are both tied for the longest win streaks in the series with the Bulls having won nine consecutive games against their rival from 1994 to 2007, while the Knights won nine straight from 2016 to 2020. The schools met in the postseason for the first time when they played in the first round of the 2022 American Athletic Conference tournament, which UCF won 60–58; they were scheduled to face each other in the first round of the 2020 edition before it was canceled less than an hour before tip-off due to the COVID-19 pandemic.

| South Florida victories | UCF victories |

| No. | Date | Location | Winner | Score |
|---|---|---|---|---|
| 1 | February 22, 1972 | Tampa, FL | South Florida | 115–96 |
| 2 | December 11, 1972 | Orlando, FL | South Florida | 100–88 |
| 3 | December 3, 1973 | Tampa, FL | South Florida | 96–76 |
| 4 | November 30, 1974 | Orlando, FL | FTU | 75–74 |
| 5 | February 17, 1975 | Tampa, FL | South Florida | 120–87 |
| 6 | November 29, 1975 | Orlando, FL | South Florida | 94–76 |
| 7 | November 29, 1976 | Tampa, FL | FTU | 66–57 |
| 8 | January 26, 1978 | Orlando, FL | FTU | 79–57 |
| 9 | February 6, 1986 | Tampa, FL | South Florida | 81–65 |
| 10 | December 17, 1987 | Tampa, FL | South Florida | 86–71 |
| 11 | December 12, 1992 | Tampa, FL | South Florida | 92–81 |
| 12 | January 26, 1993 | Orlando, FL | South Florida | 77–72 |
| 13 | February 7, 1994 | Orlando, FL | UCF | 89–85^{OT} |
| 14 | December 10, 1994 | Tampa, FL | South Florida | 89–64 |
| 15 | December 11, 1995 | Orlando, FL | South Florida | 92–82 |
| 16 | December 14, 1996 | Tampa, FL | South Florida | 66–47 |
| 17 | December 30, 1997 | Tampa, FL | South Florida | 73–72 |
| 18 | December 17, 1998 | St. Petersburg, FL | South Florida | 69–55 |
| 19 | December 3, 1999 | Orlando, FL | South Florida | 79–55 |
| 20 | December 15, 2000 | Tampa, FL | South Florida | 85–55 |
| 21 | January 29, 2002 | Orlando, FL | South Florida | 84–79 |
| 22 | December 1, 2007 | Tampa, FL | South Florida | 75–67 |
| 23 | December 6, 2008 | Orlando, FL | UCF (Vacated) (Note: UCF was forced to vacate all men's basketball wins from their 2008–09, 2009–10, and 2010–11 seasons due to NCAA sanctions) | 71–63 |
| 24 | December 16, 2009 | Tampa, FL | South Florida | 69–65 |
| 25 | November 18, 2010 | Orlando, FL | UCF (Vacated) | 65–59 |

| No. | Date | Location | Winner | Score |
|---|---|---|---|---|
| 26 | November 10, 2012 | Tampa, FL | UCF | 74–56 |
| 27 | January 2, 2013 | Orlando, FL | South Florida | 65–56 |
| 28 | February 5, 2014 | Orlando, FL | South Florida | 79–78^{OT} |
| 29 | February 15, 2014 | Tampa, FL | UCF | 75–74 |
| 30 | February 11, 2015 | Orlando, FL | UCF | 73–62 |
| 31 | March 4, 2015 | Tampa, FL | South Florida | 74–45 |
| 32 | January 6, 2016 | Orlando, FL | UCF | 75–64 |
| 33 | January 20, 2016 | Tampa, FL | UCF | 64–54 |
| 34 | January 17, 2017 | Orlando, FL | UCF | 86–64 |
| 35 | March 2, 2017 | Tampa, FL | UCF | 59–56 |
| 36 | January 20, 2018 | Tampa, FL | UCF | 71–69 |
| 37 | February 14, 2018 | Orlando, FL | UCF | 72–57 |
| 38 | February 13, 2019 | Orlando, FL | UCF | 78–65 |
| 39 | February 27, 2019 | Tampa, FL | UCF | 75–63 |
| 40 | January 18, 2020 | Orlando, FL | UCF | 55–54 |
| 41 | February 1, 2020 | Tampa, FL | South Florida | 64–48 |
| 42 | January 2, 2021 | Tampa, FL | South Florida | 68–61 |
| 43 | February 17, 2021 | Orlando, FL | UCF | 81–65 |
| 44 | January 15, 2022 | Tampa, FL | South Florida | 75–51 |
| 45 | February 3, 2022 | Orlando, FL | UCF | 68–49 |
| 46 | March 10, 2022^{A} | Fort Worth, TX | UCF | 60–58 |
| 47 | January 21, 2023 | Tampa, FL | South Florida | 85–72 |
| 48 | February 22, 2023 | Orlando, FL | South Florida | 82–75 |
| 49 | March 19, 2024^{B} | Orlando, FL | South Florida | 83–77 |
Series: South Florida leads 28–19

Bold dates indicate conference games
Italic dates indicate games that count toward the trophy series

^{A} 2022 American Athletic Conference tournament – First round
^{B} 2024 National Invitation Tournament – First round

== Women's Basketball ==
War on I–4: Women's Basketball
- Sport: Women's basketball
- First meeting: January 20, 1973; South Florida 41, FTU 30 (Note: UCF claims the first meeting was on January 12, 1978, with South Florida winning 81–70)
- Latest meeting: February 15, 2023; South Florida 73, UCF 44
- Stadiums: South Florida: Yuengling Center; UCF: Addition Financial Arena

Statistics
- Total meetings: 49 (Note: UCF claims the schools have played 43 times)
- All-time series: South Florida leads 32–17 (Note: UCF claims South Florida leads the series 29–14)
- Largest victory: South Florida, 110–55 (1992)
- Longest win streak: South Florida, 19 (1981–2016)
- Current win streak: South Florida, 2

South Florida and UCF claim two different women's basketball records, due to when they declare the first meeting occurred. According to South Florida, they lead the women's basketball series 32–17, with the first meeting occurring on January 20, 1973, with a 41–30 Bulls win in Tampa. According to UCF, the first meeting occurred on January 12, 1978, with South Florida winning 81–70 in Tampa, resulting in a 29–14 South Florida lead in the series. South Florida has won two of the three times the schools met in the American Athletic Conference tournament (the 2018 semifinal and the 2021 championship game, with UCF winning in the 2022 championship game). The Bulls hold a 12–8 lead in conference play. In 2021, the Bulls and Knights were in first and second place in the conference respectively going into the final two games of the regular season, both of which were War on I-4 matchups. UCF needed to win both games to clinch the title, while South Florida only needed to win one. The Bulls beat the Knights in Tampa in the first game to win the conference championship. The Bulls beat the Knights again nine days later in the AAC Tournament championship game. They met again in the championship game the following season, where the Knights came away victorious. The Bulls also won the 2023 regular season AAC title in a win at UCF on February 15.

| South Florida victories | UCF victories |

| No. | Date | Location | Winner | Score |
|---|---|---|---|---|
| 1 | January 20, 1973 (Note: Not recognized by UCF) | Tampa, FL | South Florida | 41–30 |
| 2 | December 30, 1973 | Orlando, FL | FTU | 59–47 |
| 3 | January 21, 1974 | Orlando, FL | FTU | 55–48 |
| 4 | January 27, 1975 | Orlando, FL | South Florida | 54–45 |
| 5 | February 4, 1975 | Tampa, FL | South Florida | 53–37 |
| 6 | February 10, 1977 | Orlando, FL | FTU | 75–68 |
| 7 | January 12, 1978 | Tampa, FL | South Florida | 81–70 |
| 8 | February 4, 1978 | Orlando, FL | FTU | 65–59 |
| 9 | December 5, 1978 | Tampa, FL | South Florida | 59–52 |
| 10 | January 26, 1979 | Orlando, FL | UCF | 76–73 |
| 11 | November 30, 1979 | Tampa, FL | South Florida | 66–64 |
| 12 | December 13, 1979 | Orlando, FL | UCF | 78–76 |
| 13 | January 26, 1980 | Orlando, FL | UCF | 76–56 |
| 14 | December 10, 1980 | Orlando, FL | UCF | 72–66 |
| 15 | November 19, 1981 | Tampa, FL | South Florida | 54–51 |
| 16 | February 2, 1987 | Tampa, FL | South Florida | 87–80 |
| 17 | January 9, 1988 | Orlando, FL | South Florida | 92–73 |
| 18 | February 2, 1988 | Tampa, FL | South Florida | 72–63 |
| 19 | December 5, 1988 | Tampa, FL | South Florida | 91–80 |
| 20 | December 19, 1989 | Orlando, FL | South Florida | 81–70 |
| 21 | March 3, 1992 | Tampa, FL | South Florida | 76–64 |
| 22 | December 1, 1992 | Tampa, FL | South Florida | 110–55 |
| 23 | January 4, 1993 | Orlando, FL | South Florida | 81–78 |
| 24 | February 2, 1994 | Tampa, FL | South Florida | 81–57 |
| 25 | December 10, 1996 | Orlando, FL | South Florida | 66–49 |

| No. | Date | Location | Winner | Score |
|---|---|---|---|---|
| 26 | November 19, 1999 | Orlando, FL | South Florida | 62–60 |
| 27 | November 21, 2000 | Tampa, FL | South Florida | 67–58 |
| 28 | January 18, 2014 | Orlando, FL | South Florida | 63–38 |
| 29 | February 8, 2014 | Tampa, FL | South Florida | 89–54 |
| 30 | February 3, 2015 | Tampa, FL | South Florida | 91–68 |
| 31 | February 28, 2015 | Orlando, FL | South Florida | 99–71 |
| 32 | January 5, 2016 | Tampa, FL | South Florida | 108–63 |
| 33 | January 24, 2016 | Tampa, FL | South Florida | 88–49 |
| 34 | February 14, 2017 | Tampa, FL | UCF | 66–62 |
| 35 | January 14, 2018 | Tampa, FL | South Florida | 62–45 |
| 36 | February 18, 2018 | Orlando, FL | South Florida | 77–68^{OT} |
| 37 | March 5, 2018^{A} | Uncasville, CT | South Florida | 74–59 |
| 38 | January 8, 2019 | Tampa, FL | UCF | 62–49 |
| 39 | February 3, 2019 | Orlando, FL | UCF | 66–63 |
| 40 | January 19, 2020 | Tampa, FL | UCF | 64–57 |
| 41 | February 19, 2020 | Orlando, FL | UCF | 56–48 |
| 42 | March 2, 2021 | Tampa, FL | South Florida | 65–62 |
| 43 | March 4, 2021 | Orlando, FL | UCF | 58–45 |
| 44 | March 11, 2021^{B} | Fort Worth, TX | South Florida | 64–54 |
| 45 | January 16, 2022 | Orlando, FL | UCF | 67–51 |
| 46 | February 13, 2022 | Tampa, FL | UCF | 54–33 |
| 47 | March 10, 2022^{C} | Fort Worth, TX | UCF | 53–45 |
| 48 | January 22, 2023 | Tampa, FL | South Florida | 83–51 |
| 49 | February 15, 2023 | Orlando, FL | South Florida | 73–44 |
Series: South Florida leads 32–17 (Note: UCF claims that South Florida leads the series 29–14)

Bold dates indicate conference games
Italic dates indicate games that count toward the trophy series

^{A} 2018 American Athletic Conference tournament – Semifinal
^{B} 2021 American Athletic Conference tournament – Championship game
^{C} 2022 American Athletic Conference tournament – Championship game

== Baseball ==
War on I–4: Baseball
- Sport: Baseball
- First meeting: March 13, 1971; South Florida 5, FTU 1 (Note: UCF claims the first meeting was on April 12, 1973, with FTU winning 6–3)
- Latest meeting: March 1, 2026; South Florida 1, UCF 2
- Stadiums: South Florida: USF Baseball Stadium; UCF: John Euliano Park

Statistics
- Total meetings: 175 (Note: UCF claims the schools have played 171 times)
- All-time series: South Florida leads 89–86 (Note: UCF claims that South Florida leads the series 86–85)
- Largest victory: South Florida, 17–1 (1972)
- Longest win streak: UCF, 8 (1994–96)
- Current win streak: UCF, 1

The schools claim two different baseball records due to when they declare the first meeting occurred. According to South Florida, they lead the baseball series 89–86, with the first meeting occurring on March 13, 1971, with the Bulls winning 5–1 in Tampa. However, according to UCF the first meeting was FTU's 6–3 victory over South Florida on April 12, 1973, in Orlando, making the series an 86–85 South Florida lead.

It is by far the most-played sport between the two teams, with 175 (or 171 according to UCF) meetings. The two teams have played four times in the NCAA tournament (all of which coming in Regional play), splitting the games 2–2. The two teams faced off three times in the American Athletic Conference baseball tournament, with the Knights winning in the 2017 quarterfinal and the Bulls winning in the 2021 championship game and the 2023 quarterfinal.

| South Florida victories | UCF victories |

| No. | Date | Location | Winner | Score |
|---|---|---|---|---|
| 1 | March 13, 1971 (Note: Not recognized by UCF) | Tampa, FL | South Florida | 5–1 |
| 2 | April 29, 1971 | Orlando, FL | FTU | 5–4 |
| 3 | March 3, 1972 | Tampa, FL | South Florida | 17–1 |
| 4 | April 22, 1972 | Orlando, FL | South Florida | 11–6 |
| 5 | April 12, 1973 | Orlando, FL | FTU | 6–3 |
| 6 | April 28, 1973 | Tampa, FL | South Florida | 10–0 |
| 7 | April 20, 1974 | Tampa, FL | South Florida | 2–0 |
| 8 | April 29, 1974 | Orlando, FL | South Florida | 7–5 |
| 9 | March 15, 1975 | Tampa, FL | South Florida | 6–5 |
| 10 | May 2, 1975 | Orlando, FL | FTU | 6–5 |
| 11 | February 28, 1976 | Tampa, FL | South Florida | 4–0 |
| 12 | April 30, 1976 | Orlando, FL | South Florida | 12–4 |
| 13 | February 26, 1977 | Orlando, FL | FTU | 2–0 |
| 14 | May 2, 1977 | Tampa, FL | South Florida | 4–2 |
| 15 | March 2, 1978 | Tampa, FL | South Florida | 2–0 |
| 16 | April 11, 1978 | Tampa, FL | FTU | 11–4 |
| 17 | March 7, 1979 | Orlando, FL | South Florida | 8–7 |
| 18 | April 7, 1979 | Tampa, FL | South Florida | 7–4 |
| 19 | 1980 (Note: Date not listed in either schools' media guide) | Orlando, FL | UCF | 10–3 |
| 20 | April 15, 1980 | Tampa, FL | UCF | 7–3 |
| 21 | May 3, 1985 | Tampa, FL | South Florida | 13–2 |
| 22 | May 4, 1985 | Tampa, FL | South Florida | 13–6 |
| 23 | May 5, 1985 | Tampa, FL | South Florida | 8–7 |
| 24 | May 6, 1985 | Orlando, FL | South Florida | 6–4 |
| 25 | May 2, 1986 | Orlando, FL | South Florida | 4–3 |
| 26 | May 3, 1986 | Orlando, FL | UCF | 6–3 |
| 27 | February 25, 1987 | Tampa, FL | South Florida | 9–2 |
| 28 | April 1, 1987 | Tampa, FL | South Florida | 6–2 |
| 29 | March 30, 1988 | Tampa, FL | UCF | 10–1 |
| 30 | April 13, 1988 | Orlando, FL | UCF | 4–3^{(11)} |
| 31 | March 28, 1989 | Tampa, FL | UCF | 6–3 |
| 32 | April 4, 1989 | Orlando, FL | UCF | 7–3 |
| 33 | February 28, 1990 | Tampa, FL | UCF | 6–3 |
| 34 | May 2, 1990 | Orlando, FL | South Florida | 7–6 |
| 35 | February 5, 1991 | Orlando, FL | South Florida | 5–2 |
| 36 | April 10, 1991 | Tampa, FL | South Florida | 10–2 |
| 37 | February 7, 1992 (Note: Played as part of the Olive Garden Classic) | Kissimmee, FL | UCF | 7–1 |
| 38 | February 9, 1992 | Kissimmee, FL | South Florida | 7–4 |
| 39 | April 14, 1992 | Orlando, FL | South Florida | 6–3 |
| 40 | April 21, 1992 | Tampa, FL | UCF | 8–6 |
| 41 | April 14, 1993 | Orlando, FL | UCF | 2–0 |
| 42 | April 21, 1993 | Orlando, FL | UCF | 7–6 |
| 43 | May 1, 1993 | Tampa, FL | South Florida | 17–6 |
| 44 | May 2, 1993 | Tampa, FL | South Florida | 11–0 |
| 45 | May 28, 1993^{A} | Tallahassee, FL | UCF | 2–0 |
| 46 | April 5, 1994 | Orlando, FL | South Florida | 8–4 |
| 47 | April 12, 1994 | Tampa, FL | South Florida | 5–1 |
| 48 | April 19, 1994 | Orlando, FL | UCF | 5–2 |
| 49 | May 3, 1994 | Tampa, FL | UCF | 7–6 |
| 50 | April 4, 1995 | Orlando, FL | UCF | 5–4 |
| 51 | April 11, 1995 | Tampa, FL | UCF | 2–0 |
| 52 | April 18, 1995 | Orlando, FL | UCF | 3–2 |
| 53 | April 25, 1995 | Tampa, FL | UCF | 11–4 |
| 54 | April 2, 1996 | Tampa, FL | UCF | 9–4 |
| 55 | April 9, 1996 | Orlando, FL | UCF | 5–1 |
| 56 | April 16, 1996 | Tampa, FL | South Florida | 10–3 |
| 57 | April 23, 1996 | Orlando, FL | UCF | 3–2 |
| 58 | February 8, 1997 | Kissimmee, FL | South Florida | 15–2 |
| 59 | April 1, 1997 | Tampa, FL | UCF | 11–3 |
| 60 | April 8, 1997 | Orlando, FL | UCF | 4–3^{(11)} |
| 61 | April 15, 1997 | Tampa, FL | South Florida | 4–3^{(13)} |
| 62 | April 22, 1997 | Orlando, FL | UCF | 2–1 |
| 63 | May 22, 1997^{B} | Tallahassee, FL | South Florida | 5–4 |
| 64 | February 8, 1998 | Kissimmee, FL | South Florida | 3–2 |
| 65 | March 31, 1998 | Orlando, FL | UCF | 10–7 |
| 66 | April 7, 1998 | Tampa, FL | UCF | 17–10 |
| 67 | April 14, 1998 | Orlando, FL | South Florida | 11–6 |
| 68 | April 21, 1998 | Orlando, FL | UCF | 10–5 |
| 69 | March 30, 1999 | Tampa, FL | UCF | 7–4 |
| 70 | April 6, 1999 | Orlando, FL | UCF | 8–6 |
| 71 | April 13, 1999 | Tampa, FL | South Florida | 5–4^{(10)} |
| 72 | April 20, 1999 | Orlando, FL | UCF | 12–11 |
| 73 | March 28, 2000 | Orlando, FL | UCF | 9–8 |
| 74 | April 4, 2000 | Tampa, FL | South Florida | 6–2 |
| 75 | April 11, 2000 | Tampa, FL | UCF | 3–0 |
| 76 | April 18, 2000 | Orlando, FL | South Florida | 13–2 |
| 77 | April 3, 2001 | Orlando, FL | South Florida | 15–5 |
| 78 | April 10, 2001 | Tampa, FL | UCF | 16–9 |
| 79 | April 17, 2001 | Orlando, FL | UCF | 18–17 |
| 80 | April 24, 2001 | Tampa, FL | South Florida | 13–10^{(10)} |
| 81 | April 2, 2002 | Tampa, FL | South Florida | 9–4 |
| 82 | April 9, 2002 | Orlando, FL | South Florida | 9–4 |
| 83 | April 23, 2002 | Orlando, FL | UCF | 6–2 |
| 84 | May 31, 2002^{C} | Tallahassee, FL | UCF | 6–1 |
| 85 | June 1, 2002^{D} | Tallahassee, FL | South Florida | 7–2 |
| 86 | April 1, 2003 | Tampa, FL | South Florida | 8–5 |
| 87 | April 8, 2003 | Tampa, FL | South Florida | 4–0 |
| 88 | April 15, 2003 | Tampa, FL | UCF | 10–6 |

| No. | Date | Location | Winner | Score |
|---|---|---|---|---|
| 89 | April 13, 2004 | Tampa, FL | South Florida | 10–4 |
| 90 | April 20, 2004 | Orlando, FL | South Florida | 6–3 |
| 91 | May 4, 2004 | Orlando, FL | UCF | 6–0 |
| 92 | April 5, 2005 | Tampa, FL | UCF | 8–7 |
| 93 | April 12, 2005 | Tampa, FL | UCF | 10–7 |
| 94 | April 19, 2005 | Tampa, FL | South Florida | 9–2 |
| 95 | April 4, 2006 | Tampa, FL | UCF | 11–0 |
| 96 | April 11, 2006 | Orlando, FL | South Florida | 4–3 |
| 97 | April 18, 2006 | Tampa, FL | South Florida | 6–4^{(11)} |
| 98 | April 3, 2007 | Tampa, FL | South Florida | 11–4 |
| 99 | April 17, 2007 | Tampa, FL | South Florida | 10–5 |
| 100 | April 24, 2007 | Orlando, FL | UCF | 11–5 |
| 101 | April 1, 2008 | Orlando, FL | South Florida | 17–4 |
| 102 | April 8, 2008 | Orlando, FL | UCF | 6–3 |
| 103 | April 29, 2008 | Tampa, FL | South Florida | 14–6 |
| 104 | May 6, 2008 | Tampa, FL | UCF | 9–5 |
| 105 | March 10, 2009 | Tampa, FL | South Florida | 8–5 |
| 106 | March 11, 2009 | Orlando, FL | South Florida | 13–5 |
| 107 | April 28, 2009 | Orlando, FL | UCF | 9–5 |
| 108 | April 29, 2009 | Tampa, FL | South Florida | 9–3 |
| 109 | March 16, 2010 | Orlando, FL | South Florida | 4–0 |
| 110 | April 6, 2010 | Tampa, FL | UCF | 7–3 |
| 111 | March 15, 2011 | Orlando, FL | South Florida | 6–5 |
| 112 | May 3, 2011 | Tampa, FL | UCF | 10–4 |
| 113 | February 28, 2012 | Orlando, FL | UCF | 12–1 |
| 114 | March 20, 2012 | Tampa, FL | UCF | 6–2 |
| 115 | February 26, 2013 | Orlando, FL | South Florida | 6–4 |
| 116 | April 10, 2013 | Tampa, FL | South Florida | 9–3 |
| 117 | April 4, 2014 | Tampa, FL | UCF | 2–0 |
| 118 | April 5, 2014 | Tampa, FL | South Florida | 4–2 |
| 119 | April 6, 2014 | Tampa, FL | UCF | 6–2 |
| 120 | May 1, 2015 | Orlando, FL | UCF | 3–0 |
| 121 | May 2, 2015 | Orlando, FL | UCF | 2–1 |
| 122 | May 3, 2015 | Orlando, FL | South Florida | 9–3 |
| 123 | May 14, 2015 | Tampa, FL | UCF | 12–9 |
| 124 | May 15, 2015 | Tampa, FL | South Florida | 7–3 |
| 125 | May 16, 2015 | Tampa, FL | South Florida | 5–4 |
| 126 | April 15, 2016 | Orlando, FL | South Florida | 6–4 |
| 127 | April 16, 2016 | Orlando, FL | UCF | 4–0 |
| 128 | April 17, 2016 | Orlando, FL | UCF | 6–5 |
| 129 | April 29, 2016 | Tampa, FL | South Florida | 4–0 |
| 130 | April 30, 2016 | Tampa, FL | South Florida | 5–4 |
| 131 | May 1, 2016 | Tampa, FL | UCF | 9–2 |
| 132 | April 7, 2017 | Tampa, FL | South Florida | 5–4^{(10)} |
| 133 | April 8, 2017 | Tampa, FL | South Florida | 6–5 |
| 134 | April 9, 2017 | Tampa, FL | South Florida | 7–5 |
| 135 | May 18, 2017 | Orlando, FL | South Florida | 7–4^{(11)} |
| 136 | May 19, 2017 | Orlando, FL | UCF | 9–1 |
| 137 | May 20, 2017 | Orlando, FL | UCF | 3–2 |
| 138 | May 26, 2017^{E} | Clearwater, FL | UCF | 12–0 |
| 139 | April 20, 2018 | Tampa, FL | UCF | 1–0 |
| 140 | April 21, 2018 | Tampa, FL | South Florida | 5–4 |
| 141 | April 22, 2018 | Tampa, FL | South Florida | 4–2 |
| 142 | April 5, 2019 | Orlando, FL | UCF | 4–1 |
| 143 | April 6, 2019 | Orlando, FL | UCF | 5–0 |
| 144 | April 7, 2019 | Orlando, FL | South Florida | 6–3 |
| 145 | April 1, 2021 | Tampa, FL | UCF | 5–2 |
| 146 | April 2, 2021 | Tampa, FL | South Florida | 6–2 |
| 147 | April 2, 2021 | Tampa, FL | South Florida | 3–1 |
| 148 | April 3, 2021 | Tampa, FL | UCF | 3–0 |
| 149 | April 16, 2021 | Orlando, FL | UCF | 6–0 |
| 150 | April 16, 2021 | Orlando, FL | UCF | 5–2 |
| 151 | April 17, 2021 | Orlando, FL | UCF | 5–4^{(10)} |
| 152 | April 17, 2021 | Orlando, FL | South Florida | 11–0 |
| 153 | May 30, 2021^{F} | Clearwater, FL | South Florida | 8–7 |
| 154 | April 1, 2022 | Orlando, FL | UCF | 5–0 |
| 155 | April 3, 2022 | Orlando, FL | UCF | 4–0^{(7)} |
| 156 | April 3, 2022 | Orlando, FL | UCF | 8–4 |
| 157 | May 6, 2022 | Tampa, FL | UCF | 10–4 |
| 158 | May 7, 2022 | Tampa, FL | South Florida | 2–1 |
| 159 | May 8, 2022 | Tampa, FL | South Florida | 3–1 |
| 160 | March 31, 2023 | Orlando, FL | South Florida | 2–0 |
| 161 | April 1, 2023 | Orlando, FL | South Florida | 3–2 |
| 162 | April 3, 2023 | Orlando, FL | UCF | 12–9 |
| 163 | April 21, 2023 | Tampa, FL | UCF | 6–4 |
| 164 | April 22, 2023 | Tampa, FL | South Florida | 14–8 |
| 165 | April 23, 2023 | Tampa, FL | UCF | 11–1^{(8)} |
| 166 | May 25, 2023^{G} | Clearwater, FL | South Florida | 15–4^{(8)} |
| 167 | March 1, 2024 | Orlando, FL | UCF | 3–2^{(10)} |
| 168 | March 2, 2024 | Orlando, FL | South Florida | 7–5 |
| 169 | March 3, 2024 | Orlando, FL | UCF | 1–0 |
| 170 | February 28, 2025 | Tampa, FL | South Florida | 13–3^{(7)} |
| 171 | March 1, 2025 | Tampa, FL | UCF | 12–1^{(7)} |
| 172 | March 2, 2025 | Tampa, FL | UCF | 12–2^{(7)} |
| 173 | February 28, 2026 | Orlando, FL | South Florida | 9–2 |
| 174 | February 28, 2026 | Orlando, FL | South Florida | 2–1^{(10)} |
| 175 | March 1, 2026 | Orlando, FL | UCF | 2–1 |
Series: South Florida leads 89–86 (Note: UCF claims that South Florida leads the series 86–85)

Bold dates indicate conference games
Italic dates indicate games that count toward the trophy series

^{A} 1993 NCAA tournament – Regional second round
^{B} 1997 NCAA tournament – Regional first round
^{C} 2002 NCAA tournament – Regional first round
^{C} 2002 NCAA tournament – Regional second round
^{E} 2017 American Athletic Conference tournament – Quarterfinal
^{F} 2021 American Athletic Conference tournament – Championship game
^{G} 2023 American Athletic Conference tournament – Quarterfinal

== Men's Soccer ==
War on I–4: Men's Soccer
- Sport: Men's soccer
- First meeting: 1974; South Florida 2, FTU 1 (Note: UCF claims the first meeting was in 1975 with South Florida winning 4–1)
- Latest meeting: August 28, 2026; UCF 2, South Florida 0
- Stadiums: South Florida: Corbett Stadium; UCF: UCF Soccer and Track Stadium

Statistics
- Total meetings: 45 (Note: UCF claims the schools have played 44 times)
- All-time series: South Florida leads 29–10–6 (Note: UCF claims South Florida leads the series 28–10–6)
- Largest victory: South Florida, 5–1 (1989)
- Longest win streak: South Florida, 9 (1989–2000)
- Longest unbeaten streak: South Florida, 11 (1974–87)
- Current win streak: UCF, 1

South Florida and UCF claim different records in men's soccer, due to when they declare the first meeting occurred. South Florida claims the first meeting occurred in 1974 with South Florida winning 2–1, giving the Bulls a 29–10–6 lead. According to UCF the first meeting occurred in 1975 with South Florida winning 4–1, giving the Bulls a 28–10–6 lead. The sides have met in the NCAA tournament twice with each team winning one of those meetings. South Florida won the only meeting in the American Athletic Conference tournament and leads the series 8–5 for conference games as a whole.

On September 15, 2024, the two schools played to a scoreless tie in Orlando, which was the first tie since 1984, 40 years before.

| South Florida victories | UCF victories | Tie games |

| No. | Date | Location | Winner | Score |
|---|---|---|---|---|
| 1 | 1974 (Note: Not recognized by UCF) (Note: UCF does not recognize the game as being played and South Florida's media guide does not list a specific date) | Unknown (Note: UCF does not recognize the game as being played and South Florida's media guide does not list a location) | South Florida | 2–1 |
| 2 | 1975 (Note: Date not listed in either schools' media guida) | Orlando, FL | South Florida | 4–1 |
| 3 | 1976 | Unknown (Note: Location not listed in either schools' media guide) | Tie | 1–1 |
| 4 | October 29, 1977 | Tampa, FL | South Florida | 3–1 |
| 5 | September 26, 1979 | Tampa, FL | South Florida | 2–1 |
| 6 | October 4, 1980 | Orlando, FL | Tie | 1–1^{OT} |
| 7 | September 23, 1981 | Tampa, FL | South Florida | 3–0 |
| 8 | October 12, 1982 | Orlando, FL | Tie | 1–1^{OT} |
| 9 | September 14, 1983 | Tampa, FL | South Florida | 2–1^{OT} |
| 10 | September 6, 1984 | Orlando, FL | Tie | 0/1–0^{OT}/1 (Note: UCF claims this game ended 1–1 in regulation. South Florida claims this game ended 0–0 in overtime.) |
| 11 | October 15, 1985 | Tampa, FL | South Florida | 3–2^{OT} |
| 12 | October 27, 1987 | Tampa, FL | UCF | 1–0 |
| 13 | October 19, 1988 | Orlando, FL | UCF | 3–2 |
| 14 | September 6, 1989 | Tampa, FL | South Florida | 5–1 |
| 15 | September 12, 1990 | Orlando, FL | South Florida | 3–1 |
| 16 | September 18, 1991 | Tampa, FL | South Florida | 2–0 |
| 17 | October 27, 1992 | Orlando, FL | South Florida | 1–0 |
| 18 | October 6, 1993 | Tampa, FL | South Florida | 1–0 |
| 19 | October 19, 1994 | Orlando, FL | South Florida | 3–0 |
| 20 | November 1, 1998 | Orlando, FL | South Florida | 3–2^{OT} |
| 21 | September 21, 1999 | Tampa, FL | South Florida | 4–3 |
| 22 | October 4, 2000 | Orlando, FL | South Florida | 3–1 |
| 23 | October 31, 2001 | Tampa, FL | UCF | 3–1 |

| No. | Date | Location | Winner | Score |
|---|---|---|---|---|
| 24 | October 8, 2002 | Orlando, FL | South Florida | 3–1 |
| 25 | August 31, 2007 | Tampa, FL | South Florida | 5–2 |
| 26 | October 14, 2008 | Orlando, FL | South Florida | 1–0^{OT} |
| 27 | September 1, 2009 | Tampa, FL | South Florida | 2–1 |
| 28 | November 18, 2010^{A} | Orlando, FL | UCF | 3–0 |
| 29 | November 20, 2011^{B} | Tampa, FL | South Florida | 2–1^{OT} |
| 30 | October 23, 2013 | Tampa, FL | UCF | 1–0 |
| 31 | October 22, 2014 | Orlando, FL | South Florida | 1–0 |
| 32 | October 21, 2015 | Tampa, FL | South Florida | 3–1 |
| 33 | September 24, 2016 | Orlando, FL | South Florida | 2–1 |
| 34 | November 11, 2016^{C} | Tampa, FL | South Florida | 2–1^{OT} |
| 35 | September 23, 2017 | Tampa, FL | South Florida | 3–2^{OT} |
| 36 | October 20, 2018 | Orlando, FL | UCF | 2–1 |
| 37 | October 26, 2019 | Tampa, FL | UCF | 1–0 |
| 38 | February 20, 2021 | Orlando, FL | South Florida | 2–1 |
| 39 | March 27, 2021 | Tampa, FL | UCF | 1–0^{OT} |
| 40 | September 29, 2021 | Tampa, FL | UCF | 3–2 |
| 41 | October 27, 2021 | Orlando, FL | South Florida | 4–3^{OT} |
| 42 | November 2, 2022 | Orlando, FL | South Florida | 2–1 |
| 43 | September 15, 2024 | Orlando, FL | Tie | 0–0 |
| 44 | September 4, 2025 | Tampa, FL | Tie | 1–1 |
| 45 | August 28, 2026 | Orlando, FL | UCF | 2–0 |
Series: South Florida leads 29–10–6 (Note: UCF claims that South Florida leads the series 28–10–6)

Bold dates indicate conference games
Italic dates indicate games that count toward the trophy series

^{A} 2010 NCAA tournament – Regional first round
^{B} 2011 NCAA tournament – Regional second round
^{C} 2016 American Athletic Conference tournament – Semifinal

== Women's Soccer ==
War on I–4: Women's Soccer
- Sport: Women's soccer
- First meeting: October 13, 1998; South Florida 4, UCF 0
- Latest meeting: August 23, 2026; UCF 2, South Florida 0
- Stadiums: South Florida: Corbett Stadium; UCF: UCF Soccer and Track Stadium

Statistics
- Total meetings: 26
- All-time series: UCF leads 15–7–4
- Largest victory: UCF, 5–0 (2004)
- Longest win streak: UCF, 8 (2001–13)
- Longest unbeaten streak: UCF, 10 (2001–15)
- Current win streak: UCF, 2

The first women's soccer meeting between the teams occurred in 1998 with South Florida winning 4–0 in Tampa. UCF currently leads the series 15–7–4, the best record of any of their teams against the Bulls. The schools have met in the American Athletic Conference tournament four times, with South Florida leading those matches 2–0–2. In the two tournament games that ended in ties, each side advanced on penalty kicks one of those times (games that require penalty kicks are counted as ties in official NCAA records). The series is tied 5–5–4 in conference games between the schools.

| South Florida victories | UCF victories | Tie games |

| No. | Date | Location | Winner | Score |
|---|---|---|---|---|
| 1 | October 13, 1998 | Tampa, FL | South Florida | 4–0 |
| 2 | October 24, 2001 | Orlando, FL | UCF | 3–2 |
| 3 | September 1, 2003 | Tampa, FL | UCF | 2–1 |
| 4 | September 8, 2004 | Orlando, FL | UCF | 5–0 |
| 5 | September 13, 2009 | Orlando, FL | UCF | 1–0 |
| 6 | September 3, 2010 | Tampa, FL | UCF | 1–0^{2OT} |
| 7 | August 19, 2011 | Orlando, FL | UCF | 5–1 |
| 8 | August 17, 2012 | Tampa, FL | UCF | 3–1 |
| 9 | September 27, 2013 | Orlando, FL | UCF | 2–1 |
| 10 | November 8, 2013^{A} | Orlando, FL | Tie | 0 (5)–0 (3) (Note: UCF advanced 5–3 on penalty kicks.) |
| 11 | October 10, 2014 | Tampa, FL | UCF | 3–0 |
| 12 | October 23, 2015 | Orlando, FL | UCF | 3–1 |
| 13 | November 5, 2015^{B} | Dallas, TX | South Florida | 1–0^{2OT} |
| 14 | October 7, 2016 | Tampa, FL | Tie | 1–1 |

| No. | Date | Location | Winner | Score |
|---|---|---|---|---|
| 15 | October 27, 2017 | Orlando, FL | Tie | 1–1 |
| 16 | November 5, 2017^{C} | Orlando, FL | Tie | 0 (5)–0 (3) (Note: South Florida won 5–3 on penalty kicks.) |
| 17 | October 26, 2018 | Tampa, FL | South Florida | 1–0 |
| 18 | October 31, 2019 | Orlando, FL | UCF | 1–0 |
| 19 | November 8, 2019^{D} | Memphis, TN | South Florida | 2–1 |
| 20 | March 21, 2021 | Tampa, FL | South Florida | 2–1 |
| 21 | October 7, 2021 | Orlando, FL | South Florida | 2–1^{2OT} |
| 22 | October 27, 2022 | Tampa, FL | UCF | 2–0 |
| 23 | September 10, 2023 | Orlando, FL | UCF | 2–0 |
| 24 | September 5, 2024 | Tampa, FL | South Florida | 1–0 |
| 25 | August 21, 2025 | Orlando, FL | UCF | 4–1 |
| 26 | August 23, 2026 | Tampa, FL | UCF | 2–0 |
Series: UCF leads 15–7–4

Bold dates indicate conference games
Italic dates indicate games that count toward the trophy series

^{A} 2013 American Athletic Conference tournament – Semifinal
^{B} 2015 American Athletic Conference tournament – Semifinal
^{C} 2017 American Athletic Conference tournament – Championship game
^{D} 2019 American Athletic Conference tournament – Semifinal

== Softball ==
War on I–4: Softball
- Sport: Softball
- First meeting: April 16, 2003; South Florida 9, UCF 0
- Latest meeting: April 23, 2023; UCF 2, South Florida 0
- Stadiums: South Florida: USF Softball Stadium; UCF: UCF Softball Field

Statistics
- Total meetings: 42
- All-time series: UCF leads 23–19
- Largest victory: South Florida, 14–3 (2005)
- Longest win streak: South Florida, 8 (2003–05); UCF, 11 (2021–present)
- Current win streak: UCF, 11

Softball was first played between the Bulls and then-Golden Knights on April 16, 2003, in a doubleheader in Tampa. South Florida won both games 9–0 and 5–4 respectively. The two schools have played each other in the NCAA tournament four times with South Florida holding a 3–1 lead while UCF won all three American Athletic Conference tournament meeting between the schools. Sara Nevins of South Florida threw the only no hitter in the series in the first game of a doubleheader on April 12, 2014, the first game where South Florida and UCF were in the same conference. UCF leads the series 23–19. UCF held a 21–10 lead while both teams were in the American.

| South Florida victories | UCF victories |

| No. | Date | Location | Winner | Score |
|---|---|---|---|---|
| 1 | April 16, 2003 | Tampa, FL | South Florida | 9–0 |
| 2 | April 16, 2003 | Tampa, FL | South Florida | 5–4 |
| 3 | May 7, 2004 | Orlando, FL | South Florida | 8–1 |
| 4 | May 7, 2004 | Orlando, FL | South Florida | 8–6 |
| 5 | March 12, 2005 | Tampa, FL | South Florida | 6–2 |
| 6 | April 20, 2005 | Tampa, FL | South Florida | 5–3 |
| 7 | May 20, 2005^{A} | Gainesville, FL | South Florida | 14–3 |
| 8 | May 21, 2005^{B} | Gainesville, FL | South Florida | 5–4 |
| 9 | April 12, 2006 | Tampa, FL | UCF | 3–1 |
| 10 | May 16, 2008^{C} | Gainesville, FL | UCF | 3–2 |
| 11 | May 18, 2012^{D} | Gainesville, FL | South Florida | 1–0 |
| 12 | April 12, 2014† | Tampa, FL | South Florida | 4–0 |
| 13 | April 12, 2014 | Tampa, FL | UCF | 3–1 |
| 14 | April 13, 2014 | Tampa, FL | UCF | 2–1 |
| 15 | May 2, 2015 | Orlando, FL | UCF | 2–1 |
| 16 | May 2, 2015 | Orlando, FL | South Florida | 3–2 |
| 17 | May 3, 2015 | Orlando, FL | UCF | 6–1 |
| 18 | May 8, 2015^{E} | Orlando, FL | UCF | 3–1 |
| 19 | April 29, 2016 | Tampa, FL | UCF | 9–0 |
| 20 | April 30, 2016 | Tampa, FL | South Florida | 4–1 |
| 21 | May 1, 2016 | Tampa, FL | UCF | 5–3 |
| 22 | April 13, 2017 | Orlando, FL | UCF | 2–0 |

| No. | Date | Location | Winner | Score |
|---|---|---|---|---|
| 23 | April 14, 2017 | Orlando, FL | South Florida | 7–2 |
| 24 | April 15, 2017 | Orlando, FL | UCF | 5–4 |
| 25 | April 27, 2018 | Tampa, FL | South Florida | 4–1 |
| 26 | April 28, 2018 | Tampa, FL | UCF | 5–1 |
| 27 | April 29, 2018 | Tampa, FL | South Florida | 2–1 |
| 28 | April 12, 2019 | Orlando, FL | South Florida | 2–0 ^{(13)} |
| 29 | April 13, 2019 | Orlando, FL | South Florida | 3–1 |
| 30 | April 14, 2019 | Orlando, FL | South Florida | 3–0 |
| 31 | May 7, 2021 | Orlando, FL | South Florida | 2–0 |
| 32 | May 8, 2021 | Orlando, FL | UCF | 4–3 |
| 33 | May 8, 2021 | Orlando, FL | UCF | 9–1 |
| 34 | May 9, 2021 | Orlando, FL | UCF | 2–0 |
| 35 | May 14, 2021^{F} | Tulsa, OK | UCF | 4–3 |
| 36 | March 25, 2022 | Tampa, FL | UCF | 5–2 |
| 37 | March 26, 2022 | Tampa, FL | UCF | 7–2 |
| 38 | March 27, 2022 | Tampa, FL | UCF | 4–0 |
| 39 | May 14, 2022^{G} | Greenville, NC | UCF | 11–0 |
| 40 | April 21, 2023 | Orlando, FL | UCF | 2–1 |
| 41 | April 22, 2023 | Orlando, FL | UCF | 3–1 |
| 42 | April 23, 2023 | Orlando, FL | UCF | 2–0 |
Series: UCF leads 23–19

Bold dates indicate conference games
Italic dates indicate games that count toward the trophy series

^{†}No Hitter

^{A} 2005 NCAA tournament – Regional first round
^{B} 2005 NCAA tournament – Regional second round
^{C} 2008 NCAA tournament – Regional first round
^{D} 2012 NCAA tournament – Regional first round
^{E} 2015 American Athletic Conference tournament – Semifinal
^{F} 2021 American Athletic Conference tournament – Semifinal
^{G} 2022 American Athletic Conference tournament – Championship game

== Men's Tennis ==
War on I–4: Men's Tennis
- Sport: Men's tennis
- First meeting: February 10, 1978; South Florida 5, FTU 4
- Latest meeting: March 4, 2026; UCF 4, South Florida 3
- Stadiums: South Florida: USF Varsity Tennis Courts; UCF: USTA National Campus

Statistics
- Total meetings: 54
- All-time series: South Florida leads 37–17
- Largest victory: South Florida, 9–0 (1979, 1983)
- Longest win streak: South Florida, 12 (1981–96)
- Current win streak: UCF, 2

The first men's tennis match took place on February 10, 1978, with South Florida winning 5–4. Men's tennis is the Bulls most successful sport against UCF, with a 37–17 all-time series lead. The teams have met four times in the American Athletic Conference Men's Tennis tournament, with one meeting coming in the quarterfinal and three coming in the championship game. South Florida is 3–1 against UCF in these four meetings, and 2–1 in the championship games. The Bulls also lead the series 8–7 when playing the Knights in conference games.

| South Florida victories | UCF victories |

| No. | Date | Location | Winner | Score |
|---|---|---|---|---|
| 1 | February 10, 1978 | Tampa, FL | South Florida | 5–4 |
| 2 | April 21, 1978 | Orlando, FL | South Florida | 7–2 |
| 3 | February 22, 1979 | Orlando, FL | South Florida | 9–0 |
| 4 | April 4, 1979 | Tampa, FL | South Florida | 8–1 |
| 5 | February 19, 1980 | Tampa, FL | South Florida | 5–4 |
| 6 | April 7, 1980 | Orlando, FL | UCF | 5–4 |
| 7 | February 17, 1981 | Tampa, FL | South Florida | 8–1 |
| 8 | March 23, 1981 | Orlando, FL | South Florida | 8–1 |
| 9 | February 11, 1982 | Tampa, FL | South Florida | 8–1 |
| 10 | March 31, 1982 | Orlando, FL | South Florida | 7–2 |
| 11 | February 4, 1983 | Tampa, FL | South Florida | 9–0 |
| 12 | February 24, 1984 | Tampa, FL | South Florida | 7–2 |
| 13 | February 19, 1985 | Tampa, FL | South Florida | 8–1 |
| 14 | February 18, 1986 | Tampa, FL | South Florida | 9–0 |
| 15 | February 24, 1993 | Orlando, FL | South Florida | 6–1 |
| 16 | April 9, 1994 | Orlando, FL | South Florida | 4–3 |
| 17 | April 6, 1995 | Orlando, FL | South Florida | 5–2 |
| 18 | April 6, 1996 | Orlando, FL | South Florida | 7–0 |
| 19 | March 8, 1997 | Tampa, FL | UCF | 4–3 |
| 20 | February 7, 1998 | Orlando, FL | South Florida | 4–3 |
| 21 | March 28, 1999 | Tampa, FL | South Florida | 6–1 |
| 22 | February 27, 2000 | Tampa, FL | South Florida | 4–3 |
| 23 | April 13, 2001 | Tampa, FL | South Florida | 5–2 |
| 24 | April 12, 2003 | Orlando, FL | South Florida | 5–2 |
| 25 | April 7, 2004 | Tampa, FL | UCF | 4–3 |
| 26 | March 12, 2005 | Orlando, FL | UCF | 4–3 |
| 27 | March 13, 2006 | Tampa, FL | South Florida | 6–1 |
| 28 | March 24, 2007 | Orlando, FL | UCF | 4–3 |

| No. | Date | Location | Winner | Score |
|---|---|---|---|---|
| 29 | March 30, 2008 | Orlando, FL | South Florida | 5–2 |
| 30 | February 28, 2009 | Orlando, FL | South Florida | 6–1 |
| 31 | April 10, 2010 | Tampa, FL | UCF | 4–3 |
| 32 | March 20, 2011 | Orlando, FL | South Florida | 4–3 |
| 33 | March 29, 2012 | Tampa, FL | South Florida | 7–0 |
| 34 | April 14, 2013 | Orlando, FL | South Florida | 4–3 |
| 35 | March 28, 2014 | Tampa, FL | South Florida | 7–0 |
| 36 | March 6, 2015 | Tampa, FL | South Florida | 5–0 |
| 37 | April 3, 2016 | Tampa, FL | South Florida | 4–0 |
| 38 | April 1, 2017 | Orlando, FL | UCF | 4–2 |
| 39 | April 23, 2017^{A} | Lake Nona, FL | South Florida | 4–1 |
| 40 | April 15, 2018 | Orlando, FL | South Florida | 4–1 |
| 41 | April 14, 2019 | Tampa, FL | UCF | 4–0 |
| 42 | April 21, 2019^{B} | Orlando, FL | South Florida | 4–3 |
| 43 | January 31, 2021 | Orlando, FL | UCF | 6–1 |
| 44 | April 3, 2021 | Tampa, FL | UCF | 4–3 |
| 45 | April 24, 2021^{C} | Orlando, FL | UCF | 4–0 |
| 46 | April 16, 2022 | Orlando, FL | South Florida | 4–3 |
| 47 | April 22, 2022^{D} | Tulsa, OK | South Florida | 4–3 |
| 48 | April 17, 2023 | Tampa, FL | UCF | 4–3 |
| 49 | April 21, 2023^{E} | Orlando, FL | UCF | 4–3 |
| 50 | March 1, 2024 | Orlando, FL | UCF | 4–0 |
| 51 | February 3, 2025 | Tampa, FL | UCF | 4–3 |
| 52 | March 9, 2025 | Orlando, FL | South Florida | 6–1 |
| 53 | January 18, 2026 | Orlando, FL | UCF | 4–1 |
| 54 | March 4, 2026 | Tampa, FL | UCF | 4–3 |
Series: South Florida leads 37–17

Bold dates indicate conference games
Italic dates indicate games that count toward the trophy series

^{A} 2017 American Athletic Conference tournament – Championship game
^{B} 2019 American Athletic Conference tournament – Championship game
^{C} 2021 American Athletic Conference tournament – Championship game
^{D} 2022 American Athletic Conference tournament – Quarterfinal
^{E} 2023 American Athletic Conference tournament – Quarterfinal

== Women's Tennis ==
War on I–4: Women's Tennis
- Sport: Women's tennis
- First meeting: February 23, 1994; South Florida 9, UCF 0
- Latest meeting: January 18, 2026; UCF 4, South Florida 0
- Stadiums: South Florida: USF Varsity Tennis Courts; UCF: USTA National Campus

Statistics
- Total meetings: 33
- All-time series: South Florida leads 20–13
- Largest victory: South Florida, 9–0 (1994)
- Longest win streak: South Florida, 9 (2006–15)
- Current win streak: UCF, 3

The women's tennis teams first played on February 23, 1994, with South Florida sweeping the Knights 9–0 in Tampa. UCF did not win a game against South Florida until the ninth time the schools met. South Florida holds the all-time lead 20–13, but UCF has won three of the four times the schools met in the American Athletic Conference Women's Tennis Tournament, including the 2019 championship game. UCF leads the series 8–5 in conference games.

| South Florida victories | UCF victories |

| No. | Date | Location | Winner | Score |
|---|---|---|---|---|
| 1 | February 23, 1994 | Tampa, FL | South Florida | 9–0 |
| 2 | February 5, 1995 | Orlando, FL | South Florida | 8–1 |
| 3 | April 4, 1996 | Tampa, FL | South Florida | 8–1 |
| 4 | March 1, 1997 | Orlando, FL | South Florida | 5–4 |
| 5 | February 20, 1998 | Tampa, FL | South Florida | 6–3 |
| 6 | February 6, 1999 | Orlando, FL | South Florida | 5–4 |
| 7 | February 16, 2000 | Tampa, FL | South Florida | 6–3 |
| 8 | February 12, 2001 | Tampa, FL | South Florida | 4–3 |
| 9 | February 11, 2002 | Orlando, FL | UCF | 6–1 |
| 10 | February 14, 2003 | Tampa, FL | UCF | 6–1 |
| 11 | February 12, 2004 | Orlando, FL | UCF | 4–3 |
| 12 | February 16, 2005 | Tampa, FL | South Florida | 5–2 |
| 13 | February 1, 2006 | Orlando, FL | South Florida | 5–2 |
| 14 | February 15, 2007 | Tampa, FL | South Florida | 7–0 |
| 15 | February 27, 2008 | Orlando, FL | South Florida | 6–1 |
| 16 | March 25, 2009 | Tampa, FL | South Florida | 4–3 |
| 17 | March 22, 2012 | Orlando, FL | South Florida | 5–0 |

| No. | Date | Location | Winner | Score |
|---|---|---|---|---|
| 18 | February 27, 2013 | Tampa, FL | South Florida | 6–1 |
| 19 | February 19, 2014 | Orlando, FL | South Florida | 6–1 |
| 20 | March 25, 2015 | Tampa, FL | South Florida | 4–3 |
| 21 | April 15, 2015^{A} | Tulsa, OK | UCF | 4–3 |
| 22 | March 30, 2016 | Orlando, FL | South Florida | 4–2 |
| 23 | April 15, 2017 | Orlando, FL | South Florida | 4–1 |
| 24 | April 4, 2018 | Tampa, FL | UCF | 4–3 |
| 25 | April 13, 2019 | Orlando, FL | UCF | 4–3 |
| 26 | April 21, 2019^{B} | Orlando, FL | UCF | 4–3 |
| 27 | April 9, 2021 | Orlando, FL | UCF | 7–0 |
| 28 | April 23, 2021^{C} | Orlando, FL | UCF | 4–1 |
| 29 | April 16, 2022 | Tampa, FL | UCF | 4–0 |
| 30 | April 21, 2022^{D} | Tulsa, OK | South Florida | 4–3 |
| 31 | April 13, 2023 | Orlando, FL | UCF | 4–1 |
| 32 | February 9, 2025 | Tampa, FL | UCF | 4–0 |
| 33 | January 18, 2026 | Orlando, FL | UCF | 4–0 |
Series: South Florida leads 20–13

Bold dates indicate conference games

Italic dates indicate games that count toward the trophy series

^{A} 2015 American Athletic Conference tournament – First round
^{B} 2019 American Athletic Conference tournament – Championship game
^{C} 2021 American Athletic Conference tournament – Quarterfinal
^{D} 2022 American Athletic Conference tournament – Quarterfinal

== Volleyball ==
War on I–4: Volleyball
- Sport: Volleyball
- First meeting: October 17, 1974; South Florida 2, FTU 1 (Note: UCF claims the first meeting was on October 5, 1976, with South Florida winning 2–0)
- Latest meeting: November 9, 2022; UCF 3, South Florida 0
- Stadiums: South Florida: The Corral; UCF: The Venue at UCF

Statistics
- Total meetings: 95 (Note: UCF claims the schools have played 92 times)
- All-time series: South Florida leads 50–45 (Note: UCF claims South Florida leads the series 48–44)
- Longest win streak: UCF, 20 (2013–present)
- Current win streak: UCF, 20

South Florida and UCF disagree on their volleyball record, with the Bulls saying that they won the first meeting 2–1 in 1974 and UCF saying the first meeting was in 1976 with South Florida winning 2–0. According to South Florida, they lead the all-time series 50–45 while UCF claims that the Bulls lead 48–44. The Knights never lost to South Florida as members of the American Athletic Conference with a 20–0 record in conference games against their rival.

| South Florida victories | UCF victories |

| No. | Date | Location | Winner | Score |
|---|---|---|---|---|
| 1 | October 17, 1974 (Note: Not recognized by UCF) | Unknown (Note: UCF does not recognize the game as being played and South Florida's media guide does not list a location) | South Florida | 2–1 |
| 2 | 1975 (Note: UCF does not recognize the game as being played and South Florida's media guide does not list a specific date) (Note: Played as part of a tournament) | St. Leo, FL | Tie | Unknown–Unknown (Note: UCF does not recognize the game as being played and South Florida's media guide lists FTU as the winner, but lists the score as unknown) |
| 3 | 1975 | Unknown | South Florida | 2–0 |
| 4 | October 5, 1976 | Lakeland, FL | South Florida | 2–0 |
| 5 | November 6, 1976 | St. Augustine, FL | FTU | 2–0 |
| 6 | 1977 (Note: Date not listed in either schools' media guide) | Unknown (Note: Location not listed in either schools' media guide) | FTU | 2–0 |
| 7 | 1977 | Unknown | FTU | 2–0 |
| 8 | October 18, 1978 | Unknown | FTU | 2–0 |
| 9 | 1978 | Unknown | FTU | 2–0 |
| 10 | 1978 | Unknown | FTU | 2–0 |
| 11 | 1979 | Unknown | UCF | 2–0 |
| 12 | 1979 | Unknown | UCF | 2–0 |
| 13 | 1979 | Orlando, FL | UCF | 2–0 |
| 14 | 1980 | Unknown | UCF | 2–0 |
| 15 | 1982 | Unknown | South Florida | 2–1 |
| 16 | 1982 | Unknown | UCF | 2–1 |
| 17 | October 22, 1982 | Orlando, FL | UCF | 2–0 |
| 18 | 1982 | Unknown | South Florida | 3–1 |
| 19 | October 21, 1983 | Unknown | UCF | 2–0 |
| 20 | October 25, 1983 | Orlando, FL | UCF | 3–2 |
| 21 | September 8, 1984 | Orlando, FL | South Florida | 3–2 |
| 22 | October 6, 1984 | Orlando, FL | South Florida | 2–0 |
| 23 | November 7, 1984 | Tampa, FL | South Florida | 3–1 |
| 24 | 1985 | Orlando, FL | South Florida | 3–0 |
| 25 | 1985 | Tampa, FL | South Florida | 3–1 |
| 26 | 1985 | Tampa, FL | South Florida | 3–0 |
| 27 | 1985 | Unknown | South Florida | 3–2 |
| 28 | 1986 | Orlando, FL | South Florida | 3–0 |
| 29 | 1986 | Tallahassee, FL | South Florida | 3–0 |
| 30 | 1986 | Unknown | South Florida | 3–0 |
| 31 | 1986 | Unknown | South Florida | 3–0 |
| 32 | 1987 | Gainesville, FL | South Florida | 3–0 |
| 33 | 1987 | Gainesville, FL | South Florida | 3–0 |
| 34 | 1987 | Orlando, FL | UCF | 3–0 |
| 35 | 1987 | Unknown | South Florida | 3–0 |
| 36 | 1988 | Unknown | South Florida | 3–2 |
| 37 | 1988 | Unknown | South Florida | 3–2 |
| 38 | 1988 | Tampa, FL | South Florida | 3–0 |
| 39 | September 2, 1989 | Tampa, FL | South Florida | 3–0 |
| 40 | September 16, 1989 | Tampa, FL | South Florida | 3–0 |
| 41 | August 31, 1990 | Tampa, FL | South Florida | 3–1 |
| 42 | September 26, 1990 | Orlando, FL | South Florida | 3–1 |
| 43 | October 24, 1990 | Tampa, FL | South Florida | 3–2 |
| 44 | September 11, 1991 | Tampa, FL | South Florida | 3–1 |
| 45 | October 2, 1991 | Orlando, FL | UCF | 3–0 |
| 46 | September 29, 1992 | Tampa, FL | South Florida | 3–0 |
| 47 | November 10, 1992 | Orlando, FL | South Florida | 3–2 |
| 48 | October 13, 1993 | Orlando, FL | South Florida | 3–0 |

| No. | Date | Location | Winner | Score |
|---|---|---|---|---|
| 49 | November 10, 1993 | Tampa, FL | South Florida | 3–2 |
| 50 | September 28, 1994 | Tampa, FL | South Florida | 3–1 |
| 51 | November 9, 1994 | Orlando, FL | UCF | 3–1 |
| 52 | September 25, 1995 | Orlando, FL | South Florida | 3–1 |
| 53 | October 24, 1995 | Tampa, FL | South Florida | 3–1 |
| 54 | September 24, 1996 | Tampa, FL | South Florida | 3–0 |
| 55 | October 9, 1996 | Orlando, FL | UCF | 3–2 |
| 56 | August 29, 1997 | Orlando, FL | UCF | 3–2 |
| 57 | November 29, 1997 | Tampa, FL | South Florida | 3–1 |
| 58 | October 6, 1998 | Tampa, FL | South Florida | 3–0 |
| 59 | October 13, 1998 | Orlando, FL | South Florida | 3–0 |
| 60 | September 29, 1999 | Tampa, FL | South Florida | 3–0 |
| 61 | November 2, 1999 | Orlando, FL | South Florida | 3–2 |
| 62 | September 12, 2000 | Tampa, FL | South Florida | 3–0 |
| 63 | October 31, 2000 | Orlando, FL | South Florida | 3–1 |
| 64 | October 23, 2001 | Tampa, FL | South Florida | 3–0 |
| 65 | November 21, 2001 | Orlando, FL | UCF | 1–0 (Forfeit) (Note: South Florida had to forfeit the game as they could not field a full team due to six players being suspended for a violation of team rules) |
| 66 | October 15, 2002 | Orlando, FL | South Florida | 3–2 |
| 67 | September 26, 2003 | Tampa, FL | UCF | 3–2 |
| 68 | September 24, 2004 | Orlando, FL | UCF | 3–1 |
| 69 | September 16, 2005 | Tampa, FL | South Florida | 3–1 |
| 70 | September 16, 2006 | Orlando, FL | UCF | 3–0 |
| 71 | September 13, 2007 | Tampa, FL | South Florida | 3–0 |
| 72 | September 15, 2009 | Orlando, FL | South Florida | 3–0 |
| 73 | November 25, 2009 | Tampa, FL | UCF | 3–2 |
| 74 | September 11, 2011 | Orlando, FL | South Florida | 3–1 |
| 75 | August 26, 2012 | Tampa, FL | South Florida | 3–2 |
| 76 | September 27, 2013 | Orlando, FL | UCF | 3–0 |
| 77 | November 1, 2013 | Tampa, FL | UCF | 3–0 |
| 78 | October 8, 2014 | Tampa, FL | UCF | 3–1 |
| 79 | October 29, 2014 | Orlando, FL | UCF | 3–2 |
| 80 | October 21, 2015 | Orlando, FL | UCF | 3–1 |
| 81 | November 4, 2015 | Tampa, FL | UCF | 3–1 |
| 82 | September 21, 2016 | Orlando, FL | UCF | 3–0 |
| 83 | November 2, 2016 | Tampa, FL | UCF | 3–0 |
| 84 | November 22, 2017 | Orlando, FL | UCF | 3–0 |
| 85 | November 25, 2017 | Tampa, FL | UCF | 3–0 |
| 86 | September 21, 2018 | Tampa, FL | UCF | 3–2 |
| 87 | November 22, 2018 | Orlando, FL | UCF | 3–0 |
| 88 | October 11, 2019 | Tampa, FL | UCF | 3–1 |
| 89 | November 1, 2019 | Orlando, FL | UCF | 3–0 |
| 90 | March 26, 2021 | Orlando, FL | UCF | 3–0 |
| 91 | March 27, 2021 | Orlando, FL | UCF | 3–0 |
| 92 | October 13, 2021 | Tampa, FL | UCF | 3–0 |
| 93 | November 17, 2021 | Orlando, FL | UCF | 3–0 |
| 94 | October 19, 2022 | Orlando, FL | UCF | 3–0 |
| 95 | November 9, 2022 | Tampa, FL | UCF | 3–0 |
Series: South Florida leads 50–44–1 (Note: UCF claims that South Florida leads the series 47–44)

Bold dates indicate conference games
Italic dates indicate games that count toward the trophy series

== Conference Championship meets ==
While both were members of the American, the conference championship meets in Cross Country, Golf, and Track & Field counted for points towards the trophy for whoever finished higher. As both are no longer in the same conference, no such meetings can take place.

Other than Men's Golf, which South Florida held a 6–3 record, UCF dominated this aspect of the rivalry series, holding a 34–3 record in all other sports for a 37–9 overall record, including a perfect 18–0 in Track & Field.

| South Florida victories | UCF victories | Tie games |

| No. | Date | Winner | Score | Tournament |
|---|---|---|---|---|
| 1 | November 2, 2013 | UCF | 6–4 | AAC Women's Cross Country |
| 2 | 2014 | UCF | 8–4 | AAC Women's Indoor Track & Field |
| 3 | April 20–22, 2014 | UCF | 5–2 | AAC Women's Golf |
| 4 | April 27–29, 2014 | UCF | 4–2 | AAC Men's Golf |
| 5 | 2014 | UCF | 7–2 | AAC Women's Outdoor Track & Field |
| 6 | October 31, 2014 | UCF | 5–4 | AAC Women's Cross Country |
| 7 | 2015 | UCF | 10–2 | AAC Women's Indoor Track & Field |
| 8 | April 19–21, 2015 | UCF | 4–1 | AAC Women's Golf |
| 9 | April 26–28, 2015 | South Florida | 3–1 | AAC Men's Golf |
| 10 | 2015 | UCF | 10–4 | AAC Women's Outdoor Track & Field |
| 11 | October 31, 2015 | South Florida | 7–5 | AAC Women's Cross Country |
| 12 | 2016 | UCF | 11–3 | AAC Women's Indoor Track & Field |
| 13 | April 17–21, 2016 | South Florida | 5–3 | AAC Women's Golf |
| 14 | May 1–3, 2016 | South Florida | 6–1 | AAC Men's Golf |
| 15 | 2016 | UCF | 10–2 | AAC Women's Outdoor Track & Field |
| 16 | October 29, 2016 | UCF | 10–5 | AAC Women's Cross Country |
| 17 | 2017 | UCF | 11–1 | AAC Women's Indoor Track & Field |
| 18 | April 16–18, 2017 | UCF | 7–1 | AAC Women's Golf |
| 19 | April 23–25, 2017 | South Florida | 4–1 | AAC Men's Golf |
| 20 | 2017 | UCF | 10–4 | AAC Women's Outdoor Track & Field |
| 21 | October 28, 2017 | UCF | 12–11 | AAC Women's Cross Country |
| 22 | 2018 | UCF | 9–8 | AAC Women's Indoor Track & Field |
| 23 | April 15–17, 2018 | UCF | 9–2 | AAC Women's Golf |
| 24 | April 22–24, 2018 | South Florida | 3–1 | AAC Men's Golf |
| 25 | 2018 | UCF | 12–10 | AAC Women's Outdoor Track & Field |
| 26 | October 25, 2018 | UCF | 12–9 | AAC Women's Cross Country |
| 27 | 2019 | UCF | 12–6 | AAC Women's Indoor Track & Field |
| 28 | April 14–16, 2019 | UCF | 5–2 | AAC Women's Golf |
| 29 | April 21–23, 2019 | UCF | 4–3 | AAC Men's Golf |
| 30 | 2019 | UCF | 12–6 | AAC Women's Outdoor Track & Field |
| 31 | November 1, 2019 | South Florida | 11–10 | AAC Women's Cross Country |
| 32 | 2020 | UCF | 11–8 | AAC Women's Indoor Track & Field |
| 33 | February 6, 2021 | UCF | 10–5 | AAC Women's Cross Country |
| 34 | April 18–20, 2021 | UCF | 6–4 | AAC Women's Golf |
| 35 | April 23–25, 2021 | South Florida | 5–1 | AAC Men's Golf |
| 36 | 2021 | UCF | 6–5 | AAC Women's Outdoor Track & Field |
| 37 | October 29, 2021 | UCF | 11–7 | AAC Women's Cross Country |
| 38 | 2022 | UCF | 6–1 | AAC Women's Indoor Track & Field |
| 39 | April 17–19, 2022 | UCF | 5–3 | AAC Women's Golf |
| 40 | April 23–24, 2022 | South Florida | 4–2 | AAC Men's Golf |
| 41 | 2022 | UCF | 7–1 | AAC Women's Outdoor Track & Field |
| 42 | October 28, 2022 | UCF | 11–8 | AAC Women's Cross Country |
| 43 | 2023 | UCF | 8–1 | AAC Women's Indoor Track & Field |
| 44 | April 17–19, 2023 | UCF | 5–2 | AAC Women's Golf |
| 45 | April 21–23, 2023 | UCF | 6–4 | AAC Men's Golf |
| 46 | 2023 | UCF | 4–1 | AAC Women's Outdoor Track & Field |
Series: UCF leads 37–9

Bold dates indicate conference games
Italic dates indicate games that count toward the trophy series

== Postseason results ==
South Florida and UCF have met head-to-head 35 times in the postseason, with 24 meetings in conference tournaments (including nine conference championship games), 10 in NCAA tournaments, and one in other postseason meetings. (Note: The other postseason meeting was in the 2024 National Invitation Tournament.) The Bulls have a 18–15–2 overall postseason record against the Knights including a record of 6–4 in NCAA tournaments and 1–0 in other postseason meetings. The record in conference tournament games is a split 11–11–2. The Bulls have a better postseason head-to-head record in baseball (4–3; including 2–2 in NCAA tournaments and 2–1 in conference tournaments), women's basketball (2–1; all in conference tournaments), men's soccer (2–1; 1–1 in NCAA tournaments and 1–0 in conference tournaments), women's soccer (2–0–2; (Note: In the two games that ended in ties, each side advanced on penalty kicks once. Games that go to penalty kicks are officially listed as ties in NCAA records.) all in conference tournaments), and men's tennis (3–2; all in conference tournaments). UCF leads in both softball (4–3; though South Florida leads 3–1 in NCAA tournaments and UCF leads 3–0 in conference tournaments) and women's tennis (3–1; all in conference tournaments). They are tied in men's basketball (1–1; South Florida leads 1–0 in the NIT and UCF leads 1–0 in conference tournaments). In conference championship games specifically, the two schools are tied 4–4–1, where South Florida has championship game wins in baseball (2021), women's basketball (2021), and men's tennis (2017 and 2019), while UCF has beaten South Florida head-to-head for a conference title in women's basketball (2022), softball (2022), men's tennis (2021), and women's tennis (2019). The draw came in the 2017 women's soccer title game, which South Florida won 5–3 on penalty kicks (games that go to penalty kicks are officially listed as ties in NCAA records).

| South Florida victories | UCF victories | Tie games |

| No. | Date | Winner | Score | Tournament |
|---|---|---|---|---|
| 1 | May 28, 1993 | UCF | 2–0 | 1993 NCAA Baseball Tournament – Second round |
| 2 | May 22, 1997 | South Florida | 5–4 | 1997 NCAA Baseball Tournament – First round |
| 3 | May 31, 2002 | UCF | 6–1 | 2002 NCAA Baseball Tournament – First round |
| 4 | June 1, 2002 | South Florida | 7–2 | 2002 NCAA Baseball Tournament – Second round |
| 5 | May 20, 2005 | South Florida | 14–3 | 2005 NCAA Softball tournament – First round |
| 6 | May 21, 2005 | South Florida | 5–4 | 2005 NCAA Softball tournament – Second round |
| 7 | May 16, 2008 | UCF | 3–2 | 2008 NCAA Softball tournament – First round |
| 8 | November 18, 2010 | UCF | 3–0 | 2010 NCAA Men's Soccer Tournament – First round |
| 9 | November 20, 2011 | South Florida | 3–2^{OT} | 2011 NCAA Men's Soccer Tournament – Second round |
| 10 | May 18, 2012 | South Florida | 1–0 | 2012 NCAA Softball tournament – Second round |
| 11 | November 8, 2013 | Tie | 0 (5)–0 (3) (Note: UCF advanced 5–3 on penalty kicks.) | 2013 AAC Women's Soccer Tournament – Semifinal |
| 12 | April 15, 2015 | UCF | 4–3 | 2015 AAC Women's Tennis Tournament – First round |
| 13 | May 8, 2015 | UCF | 3–1 | 2015 AAC Softball tournament – Semifinal |
| 14 | November 5, 2015 | South Florida | 1–0^{2OT} | 2015 AAC Women's Soccer Tournament – Semifinal |
| 15 | November 11, 2016 | South Florida | 2–1 | 2016 AAC Men's Soccer Tournament – Semifinal |
| 16 | April 23, 2017 | South Florida | 4–1 | 2017 AAC Men's Tennis Tournament – Championship game |
| 17 | May 26, 2017 | UCF | 12–0 | 2017 AAC Baseball Tournament – Quarterfinal |
| 18 | November 5, 2017 | Tie | 0 (5)–0 (3) (Note: South Florida won 5–3 on penalty kicks.) | 2017 AAC Women's Soccer Tournament – Championship game |
| 19 | March 5, 2018 | South Florida | 74–59 | 2018 AAC Women's Basketball Tournament – Semifinal |
| 20 | April 21, 2019 | South Florida | 4–3 | 2019 AAC Men's Tennis Tournament – Championship game |
| 21 | April 21, 2019 | UCF | 4–3 | 2019 AAC Women's Tennis Tournament – Championship game |
| 22 | November 8, 2019 | South Florida | 2–1 | 2019 AAC Women's Soccer Tournament – Semifinal |
| 23 | March 11, 2021 | South Florida | 64–54 | 2021 AAC Women's Basketball Tournament – Championship game |
| 24 | April 23, 2021 | UCF | 4–1 | 2021 AAC Women's Tennis Tournament – Quarterfinal |
| 25 | April 24, 2021 | UCF | 4–0 | 2021 AAC Men's Tennis Tournament – Championship game |
| 26 | May 14, 2021 | UCF | 4–3 | 2021 AAC Softball tournament – Semifinal |
| 27 | May 30, 2021 | South Florida | 8–7 | 2021 AAC Baseball Tournament – Championship game |
| 28 | March 10, 2022 | UCF | 60–58 | 2022 AAC Men's Basketball Tournament – First round |
| 29 | March 10, 2022 | UCF | 53–45 | 2022 AAC Women's Basketball Tournament – Championship game |
| 30 | April 21, 2022 | South Florida | 4–3 | 2022 AAC Women's Tennis Tournament – Quarterfinal |
| 31 | April 22, 2022 | South Florida | 4–3 | 2022 AAC Men's Tennis Tournament – Quarterfinal |
| 32 | May 14, 2022 | UCF | 11–0 | 2022 AAC Softball tournament – Championship game |
| 33 | April 21, 2023 | UCF | 4–3 | 2023 AAC Men's Tennis Tournament – Quarterfinal |
| 34 | May 25, 2023 | South Florida | 15–4^{(8)} | 2023 AAC Baseball Tournament – Quarterfinal |
| 35 | March 19, 2024 | South Florida | 83–77 | 2024 Men's Basketball National Invitation Tournament – First round |
Series: South Florida leads 18–15–2
