= 2015 American Athletic Conference women's soccer tournament =

2015 AAC women's soccer tournament
Tournament details
- Country: United States
- Teams: 8

Tournament statistics
- Matches played: 7

2015 American Athletic Conference women's soccer standings
	Conf.					Overall
Team	W		L		T	W		L		T
No. 10 Connecticut	8	–	1	–	0	17	–	2	–	0
No. 25 South Florida	6	–	2	–	1	13	–	3	–	2
UCF	6	–	3	–	0	11	–	5	–	1
Cincinnati	5	–	3	–	1	12	–	5	–	4
Tulsa	4	–	4	–	1	13	–	6	–	1
Temple	4	–	4	–	1	12	–	6	–	1
Memphis	3	–	4	–	2	8	–	7	–	3
East Carolina	3	–	5	–	1	3	–	5	–	1
SMU	2	–	6	–	1	2	–	6	–	1
Houston	0	–	9	–	0	4	–	13	–	0
+- Invited to the 2015 NCAA Division I Women's Soccer Tournament; As of November 3, 2015; Rankings from NSCAA

The 2015 American Athletic Conference women's soccer tournament is the third edition of the American Athletic Conference Women's Soccer Tournament. The tournament decided the American Athletic Conference champion and guaranteed representative into the 2015 NCAA Division I Women's Soccer Tournament. The event is held at Westcott Field on the campus of SMU in University Park, Texas.

== Seeding and format ==
The teams are seeded based on their performance in the conference's round-robin regular season. The top eight teams qualify for the event, with SMU and Houston not participating.

Team	W	L	T	Pct	Seed
Connecticut	8	1	0	.889	1
South Florida	6	2	1	.722	2
UCF	6	3	0	.667	3
Cincinnati	5	3	1	.611	4
Tulsa	4	4	1	.500	5
Temple	4	4	1	.500	6
Memphis	3	4	2	.444	7
East Carolina	3	5	1	.389	8
SMU	2	6	1	.278	—
Houston	0	9	0	.000	—

== Bracket ==
Quarterfinals
1	Connecticut	3
8	East Carolina	1
4	Cincinnati	2
5	Tulsa	0
3	UCF	2
6	Temple	1
2	South Florida	3
7	Memphis	0

Semifinals
1	Connecticut	2
4	Cincinnati	3^{OT}
3	UCF	0
2	South Florida	1^{2OT}

Finals
4	Cincinnati	1^{4–2}
2	South Florida	1
