= University of South Florida Athletic Hall of Fame =

Coordinates: 28°3′38″N 82°24′18″W

- Established: 2009
- Location: Lee Roy Selmon Athletic Center, 12503 USF Bull Run Drive, Tampa, FL, 33620
- Type: University Hall of Fame
- Director: Michael Kelly
- Owner: University of South Florida
- Website: USF Athletic Hall of Fame

The University of South Florida Athletic Hall of Fame was established in 2009 to recognize and perpetuate the memory of student athletes, teams, coaches and administrators who have made demonstrably outstanding and significant contributions to the success, tradition and heritage of USF Athletics, and who demonstrate the character and values that define the highest principles of sport. Induction in the University of South Florida Athletic Hall of Fame is the highest honor afforded by the USF Athletics Department.

The Hall of Fame is located within the Lee Roy Selmon Athletic Center on USF's Tampa campus.

== History ==
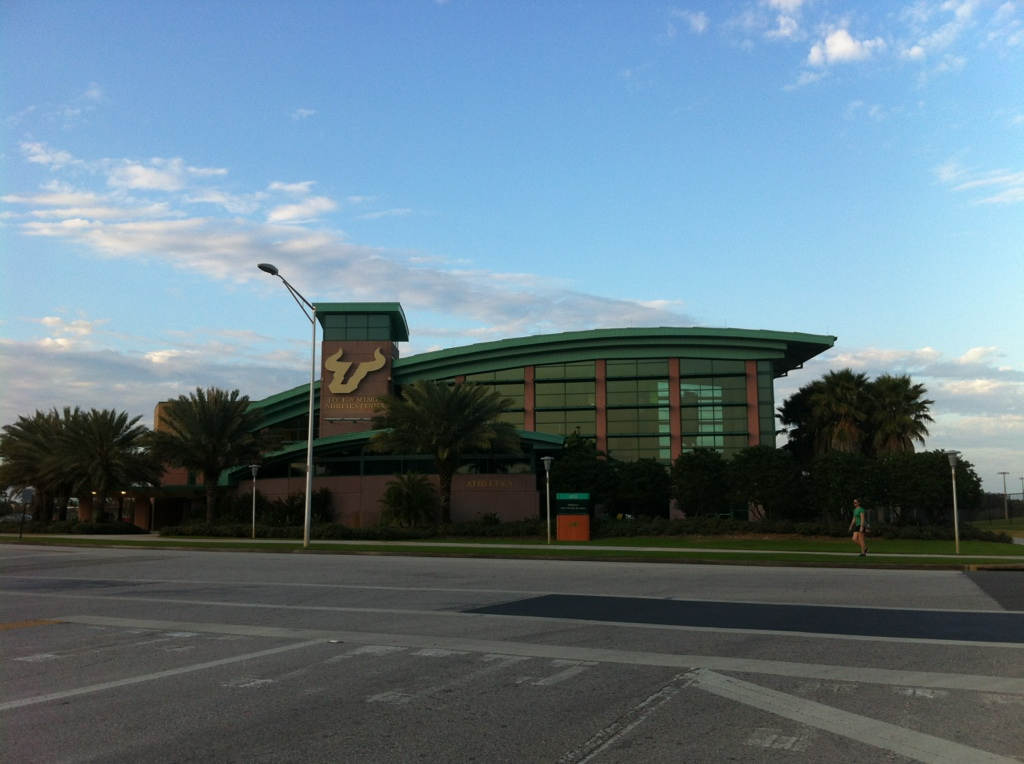
The Lee Roy Selmon Athletics Center, which is home to the USF Athletic Hall of Fame.

The Hall of Fame was established by director of athletics Doug Woolard in 2009 with the first 16 inductees. 12 of the inaugural inductees were members or coaches of the 1985 USF women's swimming team, which won the first and only NCAA national championship in USF history. Mark Harlan took over as athletic director in 2014, and no new members were inducted during his tenure. Michael Kelly brought the Hall of Fame back in 2019 after he became USF's new AD, though no class was inducted in 2021 due to the induction ceremony for 2020 being delayed by the COVID-19 pandemic.

== Selection process ==
=== Nominations ===
Nominations are accepted from both the Hall of Fame voting committee and the general public. Individuals must have completed their bachelor's degree and be at least four years removed from their USF career to be nominated. Nominees are eligible for induction for up to three years after being nominated. If not selected in that period of time, they must be re-nominated for further consideration.

=== Induction ===
Every year the three nominees with the most votes from the Hall of Fame committee, provided that they receive votes from at least five of the nine members of the committee, will be inducted into the USF Athletic Hall of Fame. Prior to 2019, any nominee that received six or more votes from the nine member committee was inducted, regardless of how many nominees passed that threshold. The annual induction ceremony takes place at USF's Homecoming football game. In 2024, four new members were inducted.

=== Voting committee ===
The USF Hall of Fame voting committee consists of nine members: a past Hall of Fame inductee, two USF Varsity Club Board members, the faculty athletics representative, a senior woman administrator, a USF Alumni Association representative, a former USF athletics coach or staff member, a distinguished community member and the director of athletics. All members of the committee serve a term of two years, with the exception of the athletic director, who serves on the committee for their entire tenure as AD and appoints the other members of the committee.

== Inductees ==
As of 2024, the Hall features 50 members: 41 players, 7 coaches, and 3 athletic directors with one member inducted as both a player and a coach.

=== Athletic Directors ===
Name	Years with USF	Year inducted	Notes
Dick Bowers	1966–82	2009	First Athletic Director in USF history, served as AD for 17 years
Lee Roy Selmon	1994–2004	2012	Associate AD 1994–2001, AD 2001–2004. Considered the "Father of USF Football"
Paul Griffin	1986–2001	2022	Oversaw the addition of two sports, 63 conference titles, and appointed several of the most celebrated coaches in USF history including Jose Fernandez, Ken Eriksen, and USF Hall of Famer Bobby Paschal

=== Coaches ===
Name	Sport	Years with USF	Year inducted	Notes
Bill Mann	Men's & women's swimming	1979–87	2009	All players and coaches of the 1985 national champion women's swimming team were inducted into the Hall
Lou Manganiello	Women's swimming (assistant)	1982–87	2009	All players and coaches of the 1985 national champion women's swimming team were inducted into the Hall
Dan Holcomb	Men's soccer	1965–86	2010	Led the Bulls to 15 conference titles, 22 straight winning seasons, .701 winning percentage, top 30 all time in wins in NCAA Men's soccer history
Sherry Bedingfield	Women's tennis	1980–2002	2010	Inducted as both a player and a coach
Robert Grindey	Men's swimming	1965–78	2011	Led the Bulls to 7 individual and relay national championships and a second place finish at the 1971 NCAA College Division Swimming National Championship
Bobby Paschal	Men's basketball	1986–96	2013	Winningest head coach in program history, led the Bulls to their first two NCAA Tournaments and four total postseason appearances
Eddie Cardieri	Baseball	1986–2006	2024	Winningest head coach in program history, five-time conference coach of the year, led the Bulls to five 40-win seasons, eight conference championships, and nine NCAA appearances

=== Athletes ===
Name	Sport	Years with USF	Year inducted	Notes
Charlie Bradley	Men's basketball	1982–85	2009	All-time leading scorer in USF men's basketball history, 1983 Sun Belt Player of the Year, Sun Belt All Decade team member, three time All Conference
Wanda Guyton	Women's basketball	1984–89	2009	1989 All American, 1989 Sun Belt Player of the Year, three time All Conference
Michelle Scarborough	Rifle	1987–90	2009	Two time individual national champion (1989 air rifle and 1990 smallbore), four time All American
Alicia McHugh	Women's swimming	1982–85	2009	All players and coaches of the 1985 national champion women's swimming team were inducted into the Hall. McHugh won the 1984 and 1985 individual national championships in the 100-yard freestyle event and was a member of two relay championship teams.
Nancy Bercaw	Women's swimming	1982–85	2009	All players and coaches of the 1985 national champion women's swimming team were inducted into the Hall. Bercaw was a member of three relay national championship teams.
Merit Greaves	Women's swimming	1982–85	2009	All players and coaches of the 1985 national champion women's swimming team were inducted into the Hall. Greaves was a member of two relay national championship teams.
Margaret Mortell	Women's swimming	1983–86	2009	All players and coaches of the 1985 national champion women's swimming team were inducted into the Hall. Mortell was a member of three relay national championship teams.
Suzanne Crenshaw	Women's swimming	1984–87	2009	All players and coaches of the 1985 national champion women's swimming team were inducted into the Hall. Crenshaw won two individual national championships in the 1985 500-yard and 1650-yard freestyle events.
Susan Duncan	Women's swimming	1985–87	2009	All players and coaches of the 1985 national champion women's swimming team were inducted into the Hall
Tracey Hayes	Women's swimming	1985–87	2009	All players and coaches of the 1985 national champion women's swimming team were inducted into the Hall
Dawn Hewett	Women's swimming	1985–87	2009	All players and coaches of the 1985 national champion women's swimming team were inducted into the Hall. Hewett won two individual national championships in the 1985 100-yard and 200-yard backstroke events and was a member of two relay national championship teams.
Julie Muller	Women's swimming	1985–87	2009	All players and coaches of the 1985 national champion women's swimming team were inducted into the Hall
Jonie Troupe	Women's swimming	1985–87	2009	All players and coaches of the 1985 national champion women's swimming team were inducted into the Hall
Ross Gload	Baseball	1995–97	2010	All time program leader in home runs and runs batted in
Joe Lewkowicz	Men's swimming	1969–72	2010	First national champion in USF history, two time national champion, 12 time All American
Sherry Bedingfield	Women's tennis	1970–72	2010	Inducted as both a player and a coach
Kerine Black	Women's track & field	1997–2001	2010	Three time C-USA Women's track & field Athlete of the Year, five time All American, holds seven program records, only walk-on to be inducted into the Hall
Radenko Dobraš	Men's basketball	1988–92	2011	1990 Sun Belt Tournament MVP, three time All Conference, third in program history in points, assists, and three pointers
Anthony Henry	Football	1997–2000	2011	Two time All Independent honors, played in the NFL for nine years
Fergus Hooper	Men's soccer	1974–77	2011	First All American in USF history, three time All American, 1977 Hermann Trophy finalist
Monica Triner	Softball	1996–99	2011	Second in USF history in wins, strikeouts, batting average, and hits
Michelle Collier	Volleyball	1998–2002	2011	Two time C-USA Player of the Year, first All American in USF Volleyball history, unanimous C-USA Player of the Decade (2004), holds seven program records
Chucky Atkins	Men's basketball	1992–96	2012	Four year starter, most three pointers made in program history
Jessica Dickson	Women's basketball	2003–07	2012	USF women's basketball all-time leading scorer, John R. Wooden Award finalist, two time All American, three time All Conference, 2003 C-USA Freshman of the Year
Chris Heintz	Baseball	1993–96	2013	1996 All American, 1996 C-USA Player of the Year, holds single season program record for hits and runs batted in
Marquel Blackwell	Football	1999–2002	2013	Second in program history in touchdowns and passing yards (first in both at time of induction)
Dayana Octavien	Women's track & field	2000–04	2013	Three time C-USA Women's track & field Athlete of the Year, two time All American, seven time conference champion, C-USA All Decade team member, 2008 Haitian Olympic Team member
Shantia Grace	Women's basketball	2005–09	2019	Three time All Conference, 2009 WNIT MVP, holds the single game scoring record in USF women's basketball history
George Selvie	Football	2006–09	2019	Only two time, first team All American in program history, 2007 Bill Willis Trophy winner, 2007 Big East Defensive Player of the Year, three time All Conference
Sara Nevins	Softball	2011–14	2019	Three time All American, four time All Conference, two time conference Pitcher of the Year, pitched two perfect games and nine no hitters, all time program leader in wins, saves, innings pitched, and strikeouts as of her graduation, member of the US Women's National Team from 2013 to 2015
Courtney Williams	Women's basketball	2012–16	2020	Second all time in program history for points and rebounds, two time All American, three time All Conference, holds the single season points record in program history
Matthew O'Neal	Men's track & field and Men's soccer	2012–16	2020	First dual-sport athlete inducted in the USF Athletic Hall of Fame, NCAA National Runner-Up (2016 indoor triple jump), six-time All-American, won six individual conference championships in track and field and was a member of USF's 2013 AAC men's soccer tournament championship team
Jeff Davis	Men's tennis	1975–79	2020	Program leader in wins, 1979 Sun Belt MVP, three time conference singles champion, seven International Tennis Federation titles
Quinton Flowers	Football	2014–17	2022	2016 conference offensive player of the year, two-time all conference, led the Bulls to two bowl wins, first quarterback at any Florida school to pass for 2,000 yards and rush for 1,000 yards
Erika Berggren	Volleyball	1993–96	2022	Two-time conference player of the year, four time All Conference, led the Bulls to three conference titles
Jeff Attinella	Men's soccer	2007–10	2023	School record 28 shutouts, 2009 Big East Goalkeeper of the Year, led team to a conference title and elite eight appearance
Kelly Lagedrost	Women's golf	1997–2001	2023	Two-time first team All-American, won two NCAA Regional titles, four-time All-Conference selection and two-time conference Player of the Year, led Bulls to three conference titles
Evelyne Viens	Women's soccer	2016–19	2023	Led Bulls to three conference championships, three-time All-American, four time All-Conference selection and two time conference Player of the Year, first USF athlete to win an Olympic gold medal
Matt Grothe	Football	2004–09	2024	All time Big East Conference leader in total offense, 2006 conference freshman of the year, led USF to their first three bowl games, second-most passing yards and fifth-most rushing yards in team history
Jeff Cunningham	Men's soccer	1994–97	2024	Two time All-American, four time all-conference, Conference USA player of the decade, led team to two conference titles and two NCAA tournament appearances, third-most assists and seventh-most goals in team history
Chase Koepka	Men's golf	2012–16	2024	Three time All-American, 2013 Big East golfer of the year, led the Bulls to three conference championships and four NCAA appearances, holds school record for tournament victories, top-10 finishes, and rounds of par or better

=== Number of inductees by sport ===
Sport	Number of athletes	Number of coaches	Total
Baseball	2	1	3
Men's basketball	3	1	4
Women's basketball	3	0	3
Football	5	0	5
Men's golf	1	0	1
Women's golf	1	0	1
Rifle	1	0	1
Men's soccer	5 (Note: Matthew O'Neal played both Soccer and Track & Field and is listed for both)	1	6
Women's soccer	1	0	1
Softball	2	0	2
Men's swimming	1	2 (Note: Bill Mann coached both Men's and Women's Swimming and is listed for both)	3
Women's swimming	10	2	12
Men's tennis	1	0	1
Women's tennis	1	1	1 (Note: Sherry Beddingfield was inducted as both a player and a coach and is the only Women's Tennis inductee)
Men's track & field	1	0	1
Women's track & field	2	0	2
Volleyball	2	0	2

== See also ==
University of South Florida

South Florida Bulls

List of University of South Florida alumni
