= 2018 American Athletic Conference women's soccer tournament =

- Classification: Division I
- Teams: 6
- Matches: 5
- Attendance: 1,746
- Site: Corbett Soccer Stadium; Tampa, Florida
- Champions: Memphis (1st title)
- Winning coach: Brooks Monaghan (1st title)
- MVP: Clarissa Larisey (Offensive); Chanel Hudson-Marks (defensive) (Memphis)
- Broadcast: American Digital Network (first round and semifinals); ESPNU (Final)

2018 American Athletic Conference women's soccer standings
	Conf.						Overall
Team	W		L		T	PCT	W		L		T	PCT
No. 19 South Florida ‍†‍‍^{y}	8	–	1	–	0	.889	15	–	4	–	0	.789
No. 23 Memphis ‍‍‡‍^{y}	7	–	2	–	0	.778	17	–	4	–	0	.810
UCF ‍‍‍	6	–	3	–	0	.667	10	–	7	–	1	.583
East Carolina ‍‍‍	5	–	4	–	0	.556	10	–	6	–	3	.605
SMU ‍‍‍	5	–	4	–	0	.556	10	–	6	–	2	.611
Temple ‍‍‍	3	–	5	–	1	.389	7	–	11	–	1	.395
Houston ‍‍‍	3	–	5	–	1	.389	7	–	10	–	2	.421
Tulsa ‍‍‍	3	–	6	–	0	.333	7	–	10	–	1	.417
Connecticut ‍‍‍	2	–	7	–	0	.222	4	–	14	–	0	.222
Cincinnati ‍‍‍	1	–	6	–	2	.222	6	–	9	–	3	.417
† – Conference champion ‡ – 2018 AAC Tournament champion y – Invited to the NCAA tournament As of December 4, 2018; Rankings from United Soccer Coaches Poll; Source:American Athletic Conference

The 2018 American Athletic Conference women's soccer tournament is the postseason women's soccer tournament for the American Athletic Conference held from October 31 to November 4, 2018. The five-match tournament will take place at the home field of the regular season champion. The six-team single-elimination tournament consisted of three rounds based on seeding from regular season conference play. The South Florida Bulls are the defending tournament champions. The Memphis Tiger's win was the program's first and also the first for coach Brooks Monaghan.

== Bracket ==
First round Wednesday, Oct. 31
4	East Carolina	1 (5)
5	SMU	1 (3)
3	UCF	3
6	Temple	0

Semifinals; Friday, Nov. 2
1	South Florida	2
4	East Carolina	0
2	Memphis	1
3	UCF	0

Final; Sunday, Nov. 4
1	South Florida	0
2	Memphis	3

== Schedule ==
=== First round ===
October 31, 2018	#3 UCF	3–0	#6 Temple	Tampa, FL
4:30 p.m. EDT	Kristen Scott 20', 59'; Stefanie Sanders 73'	Report		Stadium: Corbett Soccer Stadium; Attendance: 373; Referee: Noel Cotterell; Assistant referees: Joseph Poremba; Michel Catin; Fourth official: Bruno Mozzo

October 31, 2018	#4 East Carolina	1–1 (a.e.t.) (5–3 p)	#5 SMU	Tampa, FL
7:00 p.m. EDT	Jay Hylton-Pelaia (yellow card) 61'; Erin Mikalsen 72'		Allie Thornton 55'; Katharin Herron (yellow card) 80'; Celiana Torres (yellow card) 85'	Stadium: Corbett Soccer Stadium; Attendance: 373; Referee: Kevin Flynn; Assistant referees: Mark Allatin; Bruno Mozzo; Fourth official: Cassio Ribeiro
	Penalties
	Jay Hylton-Pelaia (penalty scored); Tori Riggs (penalty scored); Marianna Shurina (penalty scored); Kat Gonzalez (penalty scored); Jenna Dages (penalty scored)		Allie Thornton (penalty scored); Vanessa Valadez (penalty missed); Celiana Torres (penalty scored); Katharin Herron (penalty scored)

=== Semifinals ===
November 2, 2018	#2 Memphis	1–0	#3 UCF	Tampa, FL
4:30 p.m. EDT	Marie Levasseur 80'	Report		Stadium: Corbett Soccer Stadium; Attendance: 737; Referee: Cassio Ribeiro; Assistant referees: Joseph Poremba; Darne Krause; Fourth official: Michael Wallace

November 2, 2018	#1 South Florida	2–0	#4 East Carolina	Tampa, FL
7:00 p.m. EDT	Aubrey Megrath 6'; Evelyne Viens 67'	Report		Stadium: Corbett Soccer Stadium; Attendance: 737; Referee: Bruno Mozzo; Assistant referees: Michael Wallace; Eddy Fiumara; Fourth official: Joseph Poremba

=== Final ===
November 4, 2018	#1 South Florida	0–3	#2 Memphis	Tampa, FL
2:00 p.m. EST	Fanny Pelletier-LaRoche (yellow card) 64'	Report	Clarissa Larisey 5', 53'; Marie Levasseur (yellow card) 44'; Caroline Duncan 69'; Grace Duncan (yellow card) 81'	Stadium: Corbett Soccer Stadium; Attendance: 636; Referee: Mark Allatin; Assistant referees: Bruno Mozzo; Michael Wallace; Fourth official: Joseph Poremba

== Statistics ==
=== Goalscorers ===
2 Goals

- Clarissa Larisey – Memphis
- Kristen Scott – UCF

1 Goal

- Marie Levasseur – Memphis
- Aubrey Megrath – South Florida
- Erin Mikalsen – East Carolina
- Stefanie Sanders – UCF
- Allie Thornton – SMU
- Evelyne Viens – South Florida

Player	Team
Kelli Burney	USF
Aubrey Megrath	USF
Evelyne Viens	USF
Chanel Hudson-Marks	Memphis
Clarissa Larisey	Memphis
Marie Levasseur	Memphis
Stasia Mallin	Memphis
Jayda Hylton-Pelaia	ECU
Melanie Stiles	ECU
Kristen Scott	UCF
Vera Varis	UCF

== See also ==
- 2018 American Athletic Conference Men's Soccer Tournament
