= South Florida Bulls soccer =

South Florida Bulls soccer could refer to:

- South Florida Bulls men's soccer
- South Florida Bulls women's soccer
