= 2020 South Florida Bulls women's soccer team =

American college soccer season

2020 South Florida Bulls women's soccer

AAC regular season champions AAC Tournament champions

NCAA Tournament: Second round
- Conference: American Athletic Conference
- U. Soc. Coaches poll: No. 15
- TopDrawerSoccer.com: No. 12
- Record: 10–1–2 (6–0–1 The American)
- Head coach: Denise Schilte-Brown (14th season)
- Assistant coaches: Chris Brown; Iban Lopez
- Home stadium: Corbett Stadium

2020 American Athletic Conference women's soccer standings
	Conf.						Overall
Team	W		L		T	PCT	W		L		T	PCT
No. 15 South Florida †‡y ‍‍‍	6	–	0	–	1	.929	9	–	0	–	2	.909
Memphis y ‍‍‍	6	–	1	–	0	.857	8	–	3	–	0	.727
Cincinnati ‍‍‍	3	–	3	–	1	.500	5	–	5	–	1	.500
East Carolina ‍‍‍	3	–	3	–	2	.500	3	–	6	–	2	.364
Houston ‍‍‍	3	–	4	–	0	.429	6	–	4	–	1	.591
UCF ‍‍‍	2	–	4	–	1	.357	2	–	4	–	1	.357
Temple ‍‍‍	2	–	5	–	1	.313	4	–	5	–	1	.450
Tulsa ‍‍‍	1	–	6	–	0	.143	2	–	6	–	0	.250
SMU ‍‍‍	1	–	1	–	0	.500	1	–	1	–	0	.500
† – Conference champion ‡ – 2020 AAC Tournament champion y – Invited to the NCAA Tournament; As of April 18 2021; Rankings from United Soccer Coaches Poll; Source: American Athletic Conference

The 2020 South Florida Bulls women's soccer team represented the University of South Florida during the 2020 NCAA Division I women's soccer season. The regular season began on February 7, 2021 (due to delay brought on by the COVID-19 pandemic) and concluded on April 11. It was the program's 26th season fielding a women's soccer team, and their 8th season in the American Athletic Conference. The 2020 season was Denise Schilte-Brown's 14th year as head coach for the program. The Bulls completed the regular season unbeaten for the first time in program history, with seven wins, zero losses, and two ties. They won the American Athletic Conference regular season title for the third time overall and second time in three years, then won the conference tournament for the second season in a row to clinch the AAC's autobid to the NCAA Tournament. They were eliminated in the second round of the tournament by Texas A&M.

== Roster ==
As of April 16, 2021

Note: Flags indicate national team as defined under FIFA eligibility rules; some limited exceptions apply. Players may hold more than one non-FIFA nationality.

No.	Pos.	Nation	Player
0	GK	USA	Madison Holcombe
1	GK	PUR	Sydney Martinez
2	DF	JAM	Chyanne Dennis
3	DF	USA	Alanna Lutchmansingh
4	DF	CAN	Vivianne Bessette
5	MF	CAN	Fanny Pelletier Laroche
6	DF	ENG	Lucy Roberts
7	MF	NZL	Katie Kitching
8	MF	ESP	Rosalia Muino Gonzalez
9	FW	ISL	Solveig Johannesdottir Larsen
10	MF	ESP	Paula Leblic
11	FW	CAN	Madeleine Penman Derstine
12	FW	USA	Lizzie Spears
13	DF	USA	Camryn Lizardi
14	FW	CAN	Serita Thurton
15	MF	USA	Sabrina Wagner

No.	Pos.	Nation	Player
16	DF	CAN	Olivia Cooke
17	MF	GER	Chiara Hahn
18	DF	USA	Maya Alicea
19	FW	USA	Chloe Zamiela
22	MF	CAN	Dominique Marcelli
23	FW	USA	Ashley Meade
24	FW	USA	Bella Kober
25	MF	USA	Katie Moore
26	MF	USA	Hayden Fredericks
27	DF	USA	Aideen O'Donoghue
28	MF	USA	Madison Waltz Schwartzenberger
29	DF	USA	Landry Singleton
31	GK	USA	Hannah Wrigley
32	GK	CAN	Katrina Haarmann
33	MF	USA	Meghan Cavanaugh
35	FW	USA	Sydny Nasello

== Schedule ==
Date Time, TV	Rank^{#}	Opponent^{#}	Result	Record	Site City, State
Preseason
January 30*; 1:00 p.m.		FGCU	W 1–0	1–0–0	Corbett Stadium; Tampa, FL
Regular season
February 7*; 1:00 p.m.		at FAU	W 3–0	1–0–0 (0–0–0)	FAU Soccer Stadium; Boca Raton, FL
February 14; 1:00 p.m., ESPN+		at SMU (Canceled)			Westcott Field; Dallas, TX
February 21; 1:00 p.m., ESPN+		Temple	W 2–0	2–0–0 (1–0–0)	Corbett Stadium; Tampa, FL
February 27*; 6:00 p.m.		at Florida	T 0–0 ^{2OT}	2–0–1 (1–0–0)	Donald R. Dizney Stadium; Gainesville, FL
March 7; 1:00 p.m.		at ECU	W 1–0	3–0–1 (2–0–0)	Stewart Johnson Stadium; Greenville, NC
March 13; 7:00 p.m., ESPN+		Tulsa	W 3–0	4–0–1 (3–0–0)	Corbett Stadium; Tampa, FL
March 21; 6:00 p.m.	No. 24	UCF; War on I-4	W 2–1	5–0–1 (4–0–0)	Corbett Stadium; Tampa, FL
March 28; 2:00 p.m., ESPN+	No. 22	at Houston	W 3–1	6–0–1 (5–0–0)	Carl Lewis International Complex; Houston, TX
April 3; 7:00 p.m., ESPN+	No. 21	No. 14 Memphis	W 2–1	7–0–1 (6–0–0)	Corbett Stadium; Tampa, FL
April 11; 7:00 p.m.	No. 15	at Cincinnati	T 1–1 ^{2OT}	7–0–2 (6–0–1)	Gettler Stadium; Cincinnati, OH
American Athletic Conference Tournament
April 15; 7:00 p.m., ESPN+	(1) No. 15	(4) ECU; Semifinal	W 1–0	8–0–2	Corbett Stadium; Tampa, FL
April 17; 2:00 p.m., ESPN+	(1) No. 15	(3) Cincinnati; Final	W 4–0	9–0–2	Corbett Stadium; Tampa, FL
NCAA Tournament
April 27; 3:00 p.m.	No. 15	Central Connecticut State; First round	W 3–0	10–0–2	Bryan Park; Greensboro, NC
April 30; 3:00 p.m.	No. 15	(7) No. 13 Texas A&M; Second round	L 0–2	10–1–2	Bryan Park; Greensboro, NC
*Non-conference game. ^{#}Rankings from United Soccer Coaches. (#) Tournament seedings in parentheses. All times are in Eastern Time.

== Awards and recognition ==
=== Players ===
==== All-American first team ====
- Sydny Nasello

==== All-American second team ====
- Sydney Martinez

==== AAC Offensive Player of the Year ====
- Sydny Nasello

==== AAC Defensive Player of the Year ====
- Chayanne Dennis

==== AAC Goalkeeper of the Year ====
- Sydney Martinez

==== First team all-conference ====
- Sydny Nasello
- Chyanne Dennis
- Vivianne Bessette
- Sydney Martinez
- Chiara Hahn

==== Second team all-conference ====
- Sabrina Wagner

==== AAC all-rookie team ====
- Vivianne Bessette (unanimous selection)
- Chiara Hahn (unanimous selection)

=== Coaches ===
==== AAC Coach of the Year ====
- Denise Schilte-Brown

== Rankings ==
Ranking movements Legend: ██ Increase in ranking ██ Decrease in ranking RV = Received votes
	Week											
Poll	Pre	1	2	3	4	5	6	7	8	9	10	Final
United Soccer Coaches	Not released				RV	RV	24	22	21	15	15	15
TopDrawer Soccer	RV	25	25	18	17	17	16	14	14	13	14	12
