= Max Gottwald =

German footballer

Personal information
- Date of birth: 13 September 2000 (age 26)
- Place of birth: Germany
- Height: 1.92 m (6 ft 4 in)
- Position: Defender

Youth career
- Preußen Münster

Senior career*
Years	Team	Apps	(Gls)
2018–2020	Carl Zeiss Jena II	18	(1)
2019–2020	Carl Zeiss Jena	4	(0)
2020–2021	South Florida Bulls	0	(0)
- * Club domestic league appearances and goals

Max Gottwald (born 13 September 2000) is a German footballer who most recently played in the United States for South Florida Bulls.
