= South Florida Bulls cross country =

- Founded: Men's: 1965; 61 years ago Women's: 1987; 39 years ago
- University: University of South Florida
- Athletic director: Michael Kelly
- Head coach: Erik Jenkins
- Conference: The American
- Location: Tampa, Florida, US
- Course: The Claw; USF Track and Field Stadium
- Nickname: Bulls
- Colors: Green and gold

Men's NCAA appearances
- 1968, 1969, 1970, 1971, 1989, 1998, 1999, 2000

Women's NCAA appearances
- 1997, 1998, 1999, 2000, 2001

Men's conference champions
- 1990, 1991, 1992, 1993, 1997, 1998, 2000

Women's conference champions
- 1990, 1991, 1994, 1998, 1999

The South Florida Bulls cross country program represents the University of South Florida in the sport of cross country. The program consists of separate men's and women's teams and competes in the American Conference within NCAA Division I. Both of the Bulls cross country teams are coached by Erik Jenkins, who is also the director of the Bulls track and field teams. The cross country and track and field teams as a whole are directed by Erik Jenkins, who served as head coach from The teams practice and host meets at both the USF Track and Field Stadium and The Claw golf course.

== Men ==
Founded in 1965, the Bulls men's cross country team was one of the first athletic teams at USF. They have won seven conference championships, all coming between 1990 and 2000. They qualified for the Division I NCAA Championship in 1989, 1998, 1999 and 2000, and also qualified for the championship four times as members of NCAA Division II. Nine individual athletes have won individual conference championships.

== Women ==
The USF women's cross country team was founded in 1987. They have won five team conference championships and one individual conference championship. They also won the NCAA South Regional in 1999 and 2000 and qualified for the NCAA Championship every year between 1997 and 2001.

== See also ==
- University of South Florida
- South Florida Bulls
- South Florida Bulls track and field
