= 2020 American Athletic Conference women's soccer tournament =

- Classification: Division I
- Teams: 4
- Matches: 3
- Site: Corbett Stadium; Tampa, Florida
- Champions: South Florida Bulls (3rd title)
- Winning coach: Denise Schilte-Brown (3rd title)
- MVP: Offensive: Sydny Nasello, South Florida; Defensive: Sydney Martinez, South Florida
- Broadcast: ESPN+

2020 American Athletic Conference women's soccer standings
	Conf.						Overall
Team	W		L		T	PCT	W		L		T	PCT
No. 15 South Florida †‡y ‍‍‍	6	–	0	–	1	.929	9	–	0	–	2	.909
Memphis y ‍‍‍	6	–	1	–	0	.857	8	–	3	–	0	.727
Cincinnati ‍‍‍	3	–	3	–	1	.500	5	–	5	–	1	.500
East Carolina ‍‍‍	3	–	3	–	2	.500	3	–	6	–	2	.364
Houston ‍‍‍	3	–	4	–	0	.429	6	–	4	–	1	.591
UCF ‍‍‍	2	–	4	–	1	.357	2	–	4	–	1	.357
Temple ‍‍‍	2	–	5	–	1	.313	4	–	5	–	1	.450
Tulsa ‍‍‍	1	–	6	–	0	.143	2	–	6	–	0	.250
SMU ‍‍‍	1	–	1	–	0	.500	1	–	1	–	0	.500
† – Conference champion ‡ – 2020 AAC Tournament champion y – Invited to the NCAA Tournament; As of April 18 2021; Rankings from United Soccer Coaches Poll; Source: American Athletic Conference

The 2020 American Athletic Conference women's soccer tournament was the postseason women's soccer tournament for the American Athletic Conference, which was held on April 15 and April 17, 2021. Because of the COVID-19 pandemic, the tournament was played by only four teams instead of the usual six. All games were hosted at Corbett Stadium by regular season champion South Florida, who was also the defending tournament champion. The single-elimination tournament consisted of two rounds based on seeding from regular season conference play. The South Florida Bulls won the title by defeating third seeded Cincinnati 4–0 in the championship game, for their second tournament title in a row and third overall.

== Bracket ==
Semifinal; Thursday, Apr. 15
4	ECU	0
1	South Florida	1
3	Cincinnati	1
2	Memphis	0

Final; Saturday, Apr. 17
1	South Florida	4
3	Cincinnati	0

== Schedule ==
=== Semifinals ===
April 15, 2021	#2 Memphis	0–1	#3 Cincinnati	Tampa, FL
3:00 p.m.	(yellow card) 56' Clarissa Larisey	Report	17' Chloe Spitler	Stadium: Corbett Stadium; Referee: Daniel Radford; Assistant referees: Miguel Martes; Fritz Barberousse; Fourth official: Corie Cox

April 15, 2021	#1 South Florida	1–0	#4 ECU	Tampa, FL
7:00 p.m.	Kim Sanford 12' (o.g.)	Report	(yellow card) 62' Macie McDougal	Stadium: Corbett Stadium; Referee: Meghan Mullen; Assistant referees: Corey Wilt; Jamie Willis; Fourth official: Alexandra Billeter

=== Final ===
April 17, 2021	#1 South Florida	4–0	#3 Cincinnati	Tampa, FL
2:00 p.m.	7', 57' (pen.) Sydny Nasello; 67' Paula Leblic; 79' Meghan Cavanaugh; (yellow card) 49' Rosalia Muino Gonzalez	Report	(yellow card) 24' Ashley Brown; (yellow card) 79' Kendall Battle	Stadium: Corbett Stadium; Referee: Alyssa Nichols; Assistant referees: Anya Voigt; Trent Robert Van Haitsma; Fourth official: Christina Unkel

== Statistics ==
=== Goalscorers ===
There were 6 goals scored in 3 matches, for an average of 2 goals per match.

2 goals

- (United States) Sydny Nasello – South Florida

1 goal

- (United States) Chloe Spitler – Cincinnati
- (United States) Paula Leblic – South Florida
- (United States) Meghan Cavanaugh – South Florida

1 own goal

- (United States) Kim Sanford – East Carolina (against South Florida)

== All-Tournament team ==
Player	Team
Solveig Larsen	South Florida
Paula Leblic	South Florida
Sydney Martinez^	South Florida
Rosalia Muino Gonzalez	South Florida
Sydny Nasello*	South Florida
Ashley Barron	Cincinnati
Taylor Nuncio	Cincinnati
Karli Royer	Cincinnati
Chloe Spitler	Cincinnati
Grace Stordy	Memphis
Maeve English	East Carolina

* Offensive MVP

^ Defensive MVP

== See also ==
- 2020 American Athletic Conference Men's Soccer Tournament
