= 2018 SMU Mustangs women's soccer team =

American college soccer season

2018 SMU Mustangs women's soccer
- Conference: American Athletic Conference
- Record: 10–6–2 (5–4–0 American)
- Head coach: Chris Petrucelli (7th season)
- Assistant coaches: Nicole Nelson (7th season); Mat Cosgriff (5th season)
- Home stadium: Westcott Field

2018 American Athletic Conference women's soccer standings
	Conf.						Overall
Team	W		L		T	PCT	W		L		T	PCT
No. 19 South Florida ‍†‍‍^{y}	8	–	1	–	0	.889	15	–	4	–	0	.789
No. 23 Memphis ‍‍‡‍^{y}	7	–	2	–	0	.778	17	–	4	–	0	.810
UCF ‍‍‍	6	–	3	–	0	.667	10	–	7	–	1	.583
East Carolina ‍‍‍	5	–	4	–	0	.556	10	–	6	–	3	.605
SMU ‍‍‍	5	–	4	–	0	.556	10	–	6	–	2	.611
Temple ‍‍‍	3	–	5	–	1	.389	7	–	11	–	1	.395
Houston ‍‍‍	3	–	5	–	1	.389	7	–	10	–	2	.421
Tulsa ‍‍‍	3	–	6	–	0	.333	7	–	10	–	1	.417
Connecticut ‍‍‍	2	–	7	–	0	.222	4	–	14	–	0	.222
Cincinnati ‍‍‍	1	–	6	–	2	.222	6	–	9	–	3	.417
† – Conference champion ‡ – 2018 AAC Tournament champion y – Invited to the NCAA tournament As of December 4, 2018; Rankings from United Soccer Coaches Poll; Source:American Athletic Conference

The 2018 SMU Mustangs women's soccer team represented Southern Methodist University during the 2018 NCAA Division I women's soccer season. The regular season began on August 16 and concluded on October 26. It was the program's 25th season fielding a women's varsity soccer team, and their 6th season in the AAC. The 2018 season was Chris Petrucelli's seventh year as head coach for the program.

== Roster ==
As of October 31, 2018

Note: Flags indicate national team as defined under FIFA eligibility rules; some limited exceptions apply. Players may hold more than one non-FIFA nationality.

No.	Pos.	Nation	Player
0	GK	(United States) USA	Samantha Estrada
1	GK	(United States) USA	Catie Brown
2	DF	(Canada) CAN	Katharine Herron
3	MF	(United States) USA	Katia Novi
4	MF	(United States) USA	Hailey Bishop
5	MF	(United States) USA	Emily Cope
6	DF	(United States) USA	Ale Winn
7	DF	(United States) USA	Mary Meehan
8	DF	(United States) USA	Sophie Adler
9	FW	(United States) USA	Robyn Maurer
10	FW	(United States) USA	Blair Thorpe
11	DF	(United States) USA	Haley Thompson
12	MF	(Canada) CAN	Hannah Fleet

No.	Pos.	Nation	Player
13	MF	(Canada) CAN	Isabelle Nashmi
14	FW	(United States) USA	Hannah Allred
15	FW	(United States) USA	Vanessa Valadez
16	DF	(United States) USA	Danielle Escutia
17	FW	(Hungary) HUN	Brigitta Pulins
18	DF	(United States) USA	Brooke Golik
20	FW	(United States) USA	Allie Thornton
21	MF	(United States) USA	Celiana Torres
22	MF	(United States) USA	Katina Tsapos
23	DF	(United States) USA	Jessica Cooley
28	MF	(United States) USA	Courtney Sebazco
30	GK	(United States) USA	Kierstin Flint

== Schedule ==
Date Time, TV	Rank^{#}	Opponent^{#}	Result	Record	Site City, State
Non-conference regular season
August 16*; 7:00 p.m.		DePaul	W 2–1	1–0–0	Westcott Field; Dallas, TX
August 19*; 2:00 p.m.		at Long Beach State	L 0–1	1–1–0	George Allen Field; Long Beach, CA
August 23*; 7:00 p.m.		at Rice	W 2–1	2–1–0	Holloway Field; Houston, TX
August 26*; 6:00 p.m.		at TCU	T 2–2 ^{2OT}	2–1–1	Garvey-Rosenthal Stadium; Fort Worth, TX
September 2*; 7:00 p.m.		Houston Baptist	W 2–1	3–1–1	Westcott Field; Dallas, TX
September 9*; 7:00 p.m.		Florida International	W 5–2	4–1–1	Westcott Field; Dallas, TX
September 13*; 8:00 p.m.		at Northern Colorado	W 4–0	5–1–1	Jackson Stadium; Greeley, CO
September 16*; 1:00 p.m.		at Colorado State	L 0–1	5–2–1	CSU Soccer Field; Fort Collins, CO
American Athletic Conference regular season
September 20; 7:00 p.m.		Temple	W 2–0	6–2–1 (1–0–0)	Westcott Field; Dallas, TX
September 23; 1:00 p.m.		UConn	W 4–1	7–2–1 (2–0–0)	Westcott Field; Dallas, TX
September 27; 6:00 p.m.		at Cincinnati	W 3–0	8–2–1 (3–0–0)	Gettler Stadium; Cincinnati, OH
September 30; 12:00 p.m.		at East Carolina	L 1–2	8–3–1 (3–1–0)	Johnson Stadium; Greenville, NC
October 4; 7:00 p.m.		Tulsa	L 2–3	8–4–1 (3–2–0)	Westcott Field; Dallas, TX
October 7; 1:00 p.m.		No. 18 Memphis	L 1–2	8–5–1 (3–3–0)	Westcott Field; Dallas, TX
October 18; 6:00 p.m.		at No. 24 UCF	W 1–0	9–5–1 (4–3–0)	UCF Soccer and Track Stadium; Orlando, FL
October 21; 12:00 p.m.		at No. 20 South Florida	L 1–5	9–6–1 (4–4–0)	Corbett Stadium; Tampa, FL
October 26; 7:00 p.m.		at Houston	W 3–0	10–6–1 (5–4–0)	Carl Lewis Complex; Houston, TX
American Athletic Conference Tournament
October 31; 6:00 p.m.	(5)	vs. (4) East Carolina; First Round	T 1–1 (3–5 PKs) ^{2OT}	10–6–2	Corbett Stadium; Tampa, FL
*Non-conference game. ^{#}Rankings from United Soccer Coaches. (#) Tournament seedings in parentheses. All times are in Central Time.
