= Rowdies Cup =

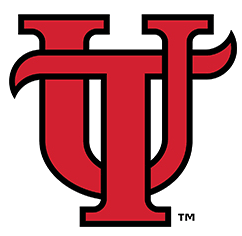
- South Florida Bulls Tampa Spartans
- Other names: Mayor's Cup (1972–2005)
- Sport: Soccer
- Location: Tampa, Florida
- First meeting: November 5, 1972; South Florida 9–2 Tampa
- Latest meeting: August 14, 2023; South Florida 6–1 Tampa
- Next meeting: tbd
- Stadiums: South Florida: Corbett Stadium; Tampa: Pepin Stadium
- Trophy: Rowdies Cup

Statistics
- Total meetings: 40
- All-time series: Official matches: South Florida (10–7–2); Exhibition matches: South Florida (16–4–1); Total matches: South Florida (26–11–3)
- Largest victory: South Florida 21–0 Tampa (Sept 20, 1973)
- Longest win streak: South Florida: 5 (1985–89, 2015–2019)
- Longest unbeaten streak: South Florida: 7 matches (2005–11)
- Current win streak: South Florida, 2

The Rowdies Cup is a traveling trophy awarded to the winner of the annual college soccer derby between the University of South Florida Bulls and the University of Tampa Spartans, two NCAA men's programs based in the city of Tampa, Florida. The rivalry was known as the Mayor's Cup from 1979 to 2005. It was renamed to honor the Tampa Bay Rowdies, a first-division professional team in the original North American Soccer League, to commemorate the 30th anniversary of their Soccer Bowl '75 championship.

== History ==
Locations of USF and UT in Tampa

The rivalry was first contested on November 5, 1972. USF won the match, 9–2. That meeting happens to have the greatest margin of victory in the series among games played during the regular season. The following year in a preseason exhibition, USF, who had been in training for over three weeks, overwhelmed the out-of-shape Spartans in the September heat by a count of 21–0. UT would finally taste victory for the first time four years later in a 1977 preseason match, by the score of 3–2.

USF has been a Division I program for all but the first meeting between the two schools, while UT has competed at the Division II level for their entire history. In the early years from 1972 to 1997 all but three of the twenty-two meetings were played during the two schools' regular season. Since the rivalry's renewal in 2005 all of the matches have been part of their preseason exhibition schedules. As of the 2023 edition, USF holds a 26–11–3 edge in the all-time series.

The name "Rowdies Cup" was first used at the 2005 meeting. It comes from the first professional sports franchise in the region, the Tampa Bay Rowdies, whose alumni were celebrating the 30th anniversary of their championship victory in Soccer Bowl '75 on August 24, 1975, with a day-long soccer festival held on August 20, 2005. The Bulls-Spartans exhibition match was the final event of the day and has been played every August ever since, aside from 2020 when the game was canceled due to the COVID-19 pandemic.

In 2011, USF opened the new Corbett Stadium, named after former Rowdies owners and USF alumni Dick and Cornelia Corbett.

== Trophy ==
The winner of the annual match is awarded a traveling trophy and has the honor of hoisting the Soccer Bowl '75 trophy, though the Soccer Bowl trophy remains on permanent display at Corbett Stadium no matter who wins the annual game. The current Rowdies Cup trophy is the second edition of the rivalry trophy. The current one, used since the series was renamed to the Rowdies Cup, is a golden circle with the Rowdies wordmark and a soccer ball inside, while the original was more in the style of a traditional soccer trophy (a large golden cup with a wooden base).

== Results ==
South Florida victories	Tampa victories

No.	Date	Location	Winner	Score
1	November 5, 1972	USF Soccer Field	South Florida	9–2
2	September 20, 1973	USF Soccer Field	South Florida	21–0
3	October 30, 1973	USF Soccer Field	South Florida	6–0
4	September 21, 1977	USF Soccer Field	Tampa	3–2
5	October 20, 1977	Plant Field	South Florida	3–0
6	September 19, 1978	Plant Field	South Florida	4–3
7	October 24, 1978	USF Soccer Stadium	South Florida	2–1
8	October 03, 1979	Plant Field	Tampa	3–2
9	November 1, 1980	USF Soccer Stadium	South Florida	3–1
10	October 31, 1981	Plant Field	Tie	2–2
11	October 30, 1982	USF Soccer Stadium	Tampa	1–0

No.	Date	Location	Winner	Score
12	October 28, 1983	Pepin-Rood Stadium	Tampa	2–0
13	October 27, 1984	USF Soccer Stadium	Tampa	2–1
14	November 2, 1985	Pepin-Rood Stadium	South Florida	5–2
15	November 2, 1986	USF Soccer Stadium	South Florida	4–1
16	October 24, 1987	Pepin-Rood Stadium	South Florida	3–2
17	October 29, 1988	USF Soccer Stadium	South Florida	5–0
18	October 28, 1989	Pepin-Rood Stadium	South Florida	2–1
19	October 30, 1990	USF Soccer and Track Stadium	Tampa	1–0
20	October 23, 1991	Pepin-Rood Stadium	Tie	2–2
21	September 12, 1992	USF Soccer and Track Stadium	Tampa	3–0
22	November 3, 1997	Pepin-Rood Stadium	Tampa	4–1

No.	Date	Location	Winner	Score
23	August 20, 2005	USF Soccer and Track Stadium	South Florida	7–0
24	August 12, 2006	USF Soccer and Track Stadium	South Florida	2–0
25	August 18, 2007	USF Soccer and Track Stadium	South Florida	2–0
26	August 16, 2008	Pepin Stadium	Tie	0–0
27	August 17, 2009	USF Soccer and Track Stadium	South Florida	4–1
28	August 21, 2010	USF Soccer and Track Stadium	South Florida	3–0
29	August 23, 2011	Corbett Stadium	South Florida	2–1
30	August 18, 2012	Corbett Stadium	Tampa	1–0
31	August 25, 2013	Corbett Stadium	South Florida	2–1
32	August 23, 2014	Corbett Stadium	Tampa	1–0
33	August 22, 2015	Corbett Stadium	South Florida	2–1

No.	Date	Location	Winner	Score
34	August 20, 2016	Corbett Stadium	South Florida	3–2
35	August 19, 2017	Corbett Stadium	South Florida	5–0
36	August 18, 2018	Pepin Stadium	South Florida	3–1
37	August 24, 2019	Corbett Stadium	South Florida	1–0
38	August 17, 2021	Corbett Stadium	Tampa	1–0
39	August 16, 2022	Corbett Stadium	South Florida	1–0
40	August 14, 2023	Corbett Stadium	South Florida	6–1
Series: South Florida leads 26–11–3
