= South Florida Bulls basketball =

South Florida Bulls basketball could refer to:

- South Florida Bulls men's basketball
- South Florida Bulls women's basketball
