= South Florida Bulls swimming and diving =

- Founded: 1965 (men); 1972 (women)
- Folded: 1987 (both)
- University: University of South Florida
- Location: Tampa, Florida, US
- Nickname: Bulls
- Colors: Green and gold

NCAA Championship appearances
- Men: 1969, 1970, 1971, 1972, 1973, 1976; Women: 1983, 1984, 1985

The South Florida Bulls swimming and diving program represented the University of South Florida in the sport of swimming. The program consisted of separate men's and women's teams which competed in NCAA Division I at the time of the program being discontinued in 1987.

The 1984–85 women's swimming team is the only varsity team in South Florida Bulls history to win an NCAA National Championship. The men's and women's teams also combined for 17 individual and relay national championships in their history.

== Men ==
The USF men's swimming team was founded in 1965 as one of the first teams to be sponsored by the young university. In the team's first NCAA Championship appearance in 1969, Joe Lewkowicz won the first individual national championship in school history in the 200-yard butterfly event. Two years later, the team would place second in the NCAA College Division. Members of the team would go on to win six individual national championships and one relay national championship.

== Women ==
The women's swimming team, known as the Lady Brahmans at the time, was founded in 1972 after the passing of Title IX.

=== 1984–85 National Championship ===
The 1984–85 South Florida Lady Brahmans team won the NCAA Division II National Championship, which was the first, and as of 2023, only NCAA National Championship in school history in any sport.

Every member of the team along with head coach Bill Mann and assistant coach Lou Manganiello was inducted into the University of South Florida Athletic Hall of Fame's inaugural class in 2009.

==== Roster ====
- Nancy Bercaw
- Suzanne Crenshaw
- Susan Duncan
- Merit Greaves
- Tracey Hayes
- Dawn Hewitt
- Alicia McHugh
- Margaret Mortell
- Julie Muller
- Joni Troupe

== Individual and Relay championships won ==
=== Men ===
Year	Athlete(s)	Competition	Time
1969	Joe Lewkowicz	200-yd Butterfly	2:01.83
1971	Rick Morehead	100-yd Breaststroke	1:01.60
1971	Rick Morehead	200-yd Breaststroke	2:14.94
1971	Rick Morehead	200-yd Individual Medley	2:01:01
1972	Rick Morehead	200-yd Breaststroke	2:13.28
1972	Rick Morehead	200-yd Individual Medley	1:59.25
1972	John Stevens, Rick Morehead, Joe Lewkowicz, Mike Sheffield	400-yd Medley Relay	3:38.06

=== Women ===
Year	Athlete(s)	Competition	Time
1983	Theresa Day	200-yd Individual Medley	2:09.05
1984	Alicia McHugh	100-yd Freestyle	51.21
1984	Nancy Bercaw, Merit Greaves, Margaret Mortell, Alicia McHugh	400-yd Freestyle Relay	3:31.25
1985	Alicia McHugh	100-yd Freestyle	51.65
1985	Dawn Hewitt	100-yd Backstroke	58.40
1985	Dawn Hewitt	200-yd Backstroke	2:05.85
1985	Suzanne Crenshaw	500-yd Freestyle	4:54.92
1985	Suzanne Crenshaw	1650-yd Freestyle	16:50.74
1985	Dawn Hewitt, Merit Greaves, Margaret Mortell, Nancy Bercaw	200-yd Medley Relay	1:47.86
1985	Dawn Hewitt, Nancy Bercaw, Margaret Mortell, Alicia McHugh	400-yd Medley Relay	3:55.54

== USF Athletic Hall of Fame ==
14 men's and women's swimming coaches and athletes that were part of the USF swimming teams have since been inducted into the University of South Florida Athletic Hall of Fame. They include head coach Bill Mann, assistant coach Lou Manganiello, the 10 members of the 1984–85 women's swimming team, Joe Lewkowicz, and men's head coach Robert Grindey.

== Folding ==
Both the men's and women's swimming teams were disbanded after the 1986–87 season due to financial difficulties along with the sport not being sponsored by the Sun Belt Conference.

== See also ==
University of South Florida

South Florida Bulls
