= Jessica Dickson =

American basketball player

Personal information
- Born: September 6, 1984 (age 42) Gainesville, Florida, U.S.
- Listed height: 5 ft 10 in (1.78 m)
- Listed weight: 135 lb (61 kg)

Career information
- High school: Vanguard (Ocala, Florida)
- College: South Florida (2003–2007)
- WNBA draft: 2007: 2nd round, 21st overall pick
- Drafted by: Houston Comets
- Position: Forward

Career highlights
- 2× First-team All-Big East (2006, 2007); First-team All-CUSA (2005); CUSA Freshman of the Year (2004); CUSA All-Freshman Team (2004); No. 25 retired by South Florida Bulls
- Stats at Basketball Reference

Jessica S. Dickson (born September 6, 1984) is an American former professional basketball player who was drafted by the Houston Comets in the 2007 WNBA draft.

== High school ==
Dickson is Vanguard High Schools all-time leader in points scored girls or boys (2,634 career points) led her team to the FHSAA State Final Four in 2002 & 2003.

== College ==
Dickson is the University of South Florida women's basketball all-time leader in points scored. She is a member of the USF Athletic Hall of Fame.

=== South Florida statistics ===
Legend
GP	Games played	GS	Games started	MPG	Minutes per game
FG%	Field goal percentage	3P%	3-point field goal percentage	FT%	Free throw percentage
RPG	Rebounds per game	APG	Assists per game	SPG	Steals per game
BPG	Blocks per game	PPG	Points per game	**Bold**	Career high

Year	Team	GP	Points	FG%	3P%	FT%	RPG	APG	SPG	BPG	PPG
2003–04	South Florida	29	540	**43.4%**	21.1%	75.9%	6.1	**1.7**	1.3	0.4	18.6
2004–05	South Florida	32	533	39.1%	31.9%	83.0%	4.7	1.2	**1.6**	0.4	16.7
2005–06	South Florida	31	**682**	42.0%	**34.7%**	**86.5%**	5.8	1.5	1.3	**0.6**	**22.0**
2006–07	South Florida	**33**	647	37.6%	29.2%	84.6%	**7.3**	1.5	1.2	0.5	19.6
Career		125	2402	40.4%	31.4%	82.7%	6.0	1.5	1.3	0.5	19.2

== Personal life ==
Dickson started Jessica Dickson 4 Kid Inc, a nonprofit organization that helps children in need.
