= South Florida Bulls track and field =

- Founded: 1992 (outdoor); 1994 (indoor)
- University: University of South Florida
- Head coach: Erik Jenkins
- Conference: The American
- Location: Tampa, Florida, US
- Outdoor track: USF Track and Field Stadium (Capacity: 4,000)
- Nickname: Bulls
- Colors: Green and gold

Individual Indoor National Champions
- Men: Romaine Beckford – High jump (2023)

Individual Outdoor National Champions
- Men: Jon Dennis – 5,000 meter run (1992, 1993); Romaine Beckford – High jump (2023); Devontie Archer, Alexavier Monfries, Corey Ottey, Gabriel Moronta – 4x400 meter relay (2025)

NCAA Indoor Tournament Appearances
- Men: 2015, 2016, 2025; Women: 1999, 2000, 2001, 2004, 2008, 2011

NCAA Outdoor Tournament Appearances
- Men: 1992, 1993, 2010, 2011, 2012, 2014, 2016, 2024, 2025; Women: 2000, 2002, 2003, 2004, 2005, 2013, 2014

Conference Indoor Championships
- Men: 2024, 2025, 2026; Women: 1995, 2000, 2001

Conference Outdoor Championships
- Men: 2024, 2025; Women: 1994, 1995, 2003

The South Florida Bulls track and field program represents the University of South Florida in the sport of track and field. The program consists of separate men's and women's teams and competes in the American Conference within NCAA Division I. Both of the Bulls track and field teams are coached by Erik Jenkins, who also coaches the USF cross country teams. The teams practice and host outdoor meets at the USF Track and Field Stadium. While the university sponsors indoor teams as well, the university does not have an indoor track facility suitable to host meets. There is an indoor track in the Campus Recreation Center which the teams use for practice, but it has no space for indoor field events or spectators.

Neither team has won a team national title, but the men's team has featured four individual national championships and one relay national championship: Jon Dennis won the outdoor 5000-meter run in 1992 and 1993, Romaine Beckford won the indoor and outdoor high jump in 2023, and the 4x400 meter relay team (consisting of Devontie Archer, Alexavier Monfries, Corey Ottey, and Gabriel Moronta) won the outdoor national championship in 2025.

== Men ==
The USF men's outdoor track and field team was founded in spring 1992, and the indoor team was founded in spring 1994. They have won five conference championships, the 2024 indoor and outdoor, 2025 indoor and outdoor, and 2026 indoor American Conference titles. They have made three appearances in the NCAA Division I Men's Indoor Track and Field Championships and nine appearances in the NCAA Division I Men's Outdoor Track and Field Championships. Members of the team have won 42 individual indoor and 65 individual outdoor conference championships, plus five relay indoor and seven relay outdoor conference championships.

Jon Dennis won the 1992 and 1993 national championships in the outdoor 5,000 meter run, Romaine Beckford won the 2023 national championship in the indoor and outdoor high jump, and Devontie Archer, Alexavier Monfries, Corey Ottey, and Gabriel Moronta won the 4x400 meter relay in 2025. Matthew O'Neal was the national runner-up in the 2016 indoor triple jump, and Kobe Babin was the national runner-up in the 2025 indoor pole vault.

== Women ==
The USF women's outdoor and indoor track and field teams were also founded in 1992 and 1994, respectively. They have won three indoor and three outdoor team conference championships and appeared in six NCAA Division I Women's Indoor Track and Field Championships and seven NCAA Division I Women's Outdoor Track and Field Championships. Members of the team have won 43 individual indoor and 59 individual outdoor conference championships, plus four relay indoor and ten relay outdoor conference championships.

Two women's athletes have finished as NCAA runners up: Tara Quinn in the 2002 outdoor 10,000 meter run and Courtney Anderson in the 2013 outdoor high jump.

== Athletes ==
=== All-Americans ===
As of 2022, the men's program has produced 14 first team all-American selections from seven athletes, while the women's program has produced 13 first team selections from six athletes and one relay team.

==== Men's first team all-Americans ====
- Jon Dennis (1992 outdoor 5,000 meter run, 1993 outdoor 5,000 meter run)
- Jimmy Baxter (2001 outdoor high jump, 2004 outdoor high jump)
- Jan-Erik Solo (2001 outdoor steeplechase)
- Mikese Morse (2008 outdoor long jump)
- David Aristil (2010 outdoor 400-meter hurdles, 2011 outdoor 400-meter hurdles, 2012 outdoor 400-meter hurdles)
- Jared Thomas (2012 outdoor discus)
- Matthew O'Neal (2013 outdoor triple jump, 2014 outdoor triple jump, 2015 indoor triple jump, 2015 outdoor triple jump, 2016 indoor triple jump, 2016 outdoor triple jump)

==== Women's first team all-Americans ====
- Kerine Black (2000 outdoor triple jump, 2000 indoor triple jump, 2001 indoor long jump)
- Kerine Black, Damu Cherry, Maiteland Marks, Sasha Springer, Amber Williams (2000 outdoor 4x100 meter relay)
- Tara Quinn (2002 outdoor 10,000 meter run)
- Chandra Brewer (2003 outdoor shot put, 2005 outdoor shot put)
- Dayana Octavien (2004 outdoor discus, 2004 indoor weight throw)
- Denise von Eynatten (2008 indoor pole vault, 2011 indoor pole vault)
- Courtney Anderson (2013 outdoor high jump, 2014 outdoor high jump)

=== USF Athletic Hall of Fame ===
Three track and field athletes have been inducted into the University of South Florida Athletic Hall of Fame, two women and one man:

- Kerine Black, 1997–2001
- Dayana Octavien, 2000–04
- Matthew O'Neal, 2012–16

=== Olympians ===
Five Bulls track and field athletes have competed in the Olympics:

- (Jamaica) Llewelyn Bredwood, 2000
- (Jamaica) Kemel Thompson, 2000, 2004
- (United States) Damu Cherry, 2008
- (Haiti) Dayana Octavien, 2008 (Note: Was selected but did not compete)
- (Trinidad and Tobago) Sasha Springer-Jones, 2008
- (Jamaica) Romaine Beckford, 2024
- (Ghana) Abdul-Rasheed Saminu, 2024

As of the 2020 Summer Olympics, no Bulls have won any Olympic medals in track & field.

== See also ==
- University of South Florida
- South Florida Bulls
- South Florida Bulls cross country
