= George Kiefer =

George Kiefer may refer to:

- George Kiefer (soccer) (born c. 1971), American soccer coach
- George W. Kiefer (1891–1943), member of the Minnesota House of Representatives

== See also ==
- George David Kieffer (born 1947), American lawyer, author, civic leader and composer
