= USF Track and Field Stadium =

Sports venue in Tampa, Florida

- Interactive map of USF Track and Field Stadium
- Former names: USF Soccer Stadium (1978–1991); USF Soccer and Track Stadium (1991–2010)
- Address: United States
- Location: Tampa, Florida
- Coordinates: 28.063024°N 82.406741°W
- Owner: University of South Florida
- Operator: Univ. of South Florida Athletics
- Capacity: 4,000 (all-seated)
- Type: Stadium
- Surface: Grass (field); Mondotrack (track)
- Current use: Track and field

Construction
- Opened: 1978; 48 years ago
- Renovated: 1991, 1998, 2008, 2022

Tenants
- South Florida Bulls (NCAA) teams: men's and women's track & field (1991-present); men's soccer (1978–2010); women's soccer (1995–2010); Professional teams: Tampa Bay Rowdies (1991–1992); Tampa Bay Cyclones (1995–1996)

Website
- gousfbulls.com/trackandfieldstadium

The USF Track and Field Stadium (formerly known as the USF Soccer Stadium from 1978 to 1991 and the USF Soccer and Track Stadium from 1991 to 2010) is a track and field stadium located in Tampa, Florida, United States. It was built in 1978 and is currently home to the men's and women's track and field teams from the University of South Florida.

It also hosted the school's men's and women's soccer programs from 1978 and 1995 respectively through the end of their 2010 seasons, when they moved to Corbett Stadium.

== History ==
The 4,000-seat stadium was built in 1978 on the site of the USF Soccer Field, which from 1965–1978 was only a field and did not have any permanent bleachers. The stadium was renovated to add a running track in 1991, when USF's men's and women's track and field programs were founded.

The configuration of the track was slightly altered in 1998.

In 2008, the stadium was remodeled again. The renovations included new lighting, a new state-of-the-art Mondo track surface (the same type of surface that is used in the Olympics), a new electronic scoreboard, and some aesthetic features.

In the fall of 2010, USF began construction on a new soccer stadium. The new Corbett Soccer Stadium hosted its first match on August 23, 2011, as the Bulls men's team defeated the crosstown rival University of Tampa Spartans 2–1 in the annual preseason Rowdies Cup. The original stadium remains in use as a track and field facility and for other events.

Another new track surface was installed in 2022 to replace the one installed in 2008. For the first time, the track was made to be USF's green and gold instead of red, which had been the color since the track was added to the facility in 1991.

== Events hosted ==
The 4,000 capacity stadium has hosted several events throughout the years including Lamar Hunt US Open Cup matches, the NCAA Division I Men's Soccer Championship final twice, the C-USA soccer tournaments for men and women, the men's Big East soccer tournament, the C-USA track and field championships once, and the American Athletic Conference track and field championships twice.

In 1984, when Tampa hosted Super Bowl XVIII at Tampa Stadium, the Washington Redskins practiced at the stadium. Concerned about the lack of privacy at the stadium, the Redskins purchased a green tarpaulin that was attached to the fence around the stadium. The Redskins donated the tarp to the university and it remained in use for many years.

In the mid-1980s the stadium hosted preseason training for the New Jersey Generals of the United States Football League (USFL), including stars Herschel Walker and Brian Sipe. The Generals' players stayed and dined at nearby Fontana Hall.

The 1990 and 1991 NCAA Division I Men's Soccer Tournament semifinal and championship games were hosted at the stadium.

The Tampa Bay Rowdies played one 1990 playoff game there before using the facility full-time in 1991 and 1992 for home games while playing in the American Professional Soccer League. The Tampa Bay Cyclones of the USISL played most of their home games there in 1995 and 1996 before moving to Jacksonville.

USF's football spring game was played at the stadium from 1998 until 2011.

Preceded by Rutgers Stadium	Host of the College Cup; 1990–1991	Succeeded by Richardson Stadium
Preceded by Tampa Stadium	Home of the Tampa Bay Rowdies; 1991–1992	Succeeded by Tampa Stadium
