= South Florida Bulls men's soccer =

American college soccer team

- Founded: 1965; 61 years ago
- University: University of South Florida
- Athletic director: Michael Kelly
- Head coach: George Kiefer (16th season)
- Conference: The American
- Location: Tampa, Florida, US
- Stadium: Corbett Stadium (capacity: 4,000)
- Nickname: Bulls
- Colors: Green and gold
Home	Away

NCAA tournament Quarterfinals
- 1997, 2008, 2011

NCAA tournament Round of 16
- 1969, 1972, 1973, 1997, 2007, 2008, 2011

NCAA tournament appearances
- 1969, 1970, 1971, 1972, 1973, 1975, 1982, 1996, 1997, 1998, 2001, 2005, 2007, 2008, 2009, 2010, 2011, 2012, 2013, 2015, 2016, 2019, 2022

Conference tournament championships
- 1976, 1977, 1979, 1980, 1981, 1982, 1985, 1986, 1988, 1991, 1996, 1998, 2008, 2013

Conference regular season championships
- 1976, 1980, 1981, 1982, 1983, 1984, 1985, 1996, 1997, 1998, 2005, 2011, 2016

The South Florida Bulls men's soccer team represents the University of South Florida in the sport of soccer. The Bulls currently compete in the American Conference (The American) within the National Collegiate Athletic Association (NCAA). USF plays in Corbett Stadium, which opened in 2011 and is also used by the USF women's soccer team. Prior to that, they played at USF Soccer Field from their first season in 1965 until 1978 and USF Soccer Stadium (later called USF Soccer and Track Stadium) from 1979 until 2010. They are coached by Bob Butehorn, who is in his sixth year with the Bulls as of the 2022 season.

The men's soccer team was the first team in USF history to play an intercollegiate game, defeating Florida Southern 4–3 on September 25, 1965.

Men's soccer is historically one of USF's most successful sports teams, winning a combined 27 regular season and tournament conference championships (the most of any program at the school) and reaching the NCAA Tournament 23 times. The furthest the Bulls have advanced in the tournament is to the Elite Eight, which they have reached three times.

== History ==
=== Dan Holcomb era (1965–1986) ===
USF men's soccer began NCAA play in 1965 under Coach Dan Holcomb. Holcomb guided the team for 22 years, compiling a record of 216–86–23, and earning 7 NCAA tournament berths and 15 combined regular season and tournament conference titles.

=== Jay Miller era (1987–1993) ===
In 1987, Jay Miller took over as coach of the Bulls. In seven years, he compiled a record of 69–43–15. The Bulls entered the Sun Belt Conference in 1990, and, with a record 5–1–1 in conference play, they were named co-champions.

In 1992 and 1993 the Bulls played in the Metro Conference, compiling a conference record of 3–5–1.

Under Coach Miller, the Bulls failed to reach the NCAA Tournament.

=== T. Logan Fleck era (1994–1996) ===
In three seasons, Fleck compiled a record of 34–17–0. In 1994, while still in the Metro Conference, The Bulls were 9–7–0 overall, and 3–2 in conference. They moved to Conference USA in 1995, and went 8–6–0 overall, and 5–3–0 in conference play. In 1996, Fleck's final season, the Bulls won the Conference USA title, and appeared in the NCAA Tournament. Fleck, who was also the inaugural coach of the USF women's soccer team in 1995 and 1996, resigned after the 1996 season to coach the women's team full time.

=== David Christiansen era (1997) ===
David Christainsen, a 28-year old assistant under Coach Fleck, was hired as the interim coach of the Bulls for the 1997 season. Christiansen went 14–8–2 overall, and 5–1–2 in conference, as the team was named Conference USA co-champions. Christiansen took the team deep into NCAA Tournament, their best result up to that point, as they made it all the way to the Elite Eight. Christansen resigned after the season because of an incident on the team's flight back to Tampa following their loss to Indiana in the NCAA Tournament.

=== John Hackworth era (1998–2001) ===
In 1998, under Coach Hackworth, the Bulls won the conference championship for a third straight year, this time winning both the regular season and tournament Conference USA titles. The team also appeared in the NCAA tournament for the third year in a row. Hackworth compiled a record of 47–32–2 overall, and 20–13–1 in conference in four seasons.

=== George Kiefer era (2002–2016) ===
In 2002, George Kiefer took over as coach. In 2004, the Bulls jumped from Conference USA to the Big East, and in 2013 the Big East transitioned to the American Athletic Conference (now known as the American Conference). The Bulls won the Big East regular season title in 2005 and 2011, the Big East tournament in 2008, the inaugural AAC Tournament in 2013, and the AAC regular season title in 2016. Under Coach Keifer, the Bulls found themselves in 10 NCAA Tournaments, including seven straight (2007–2013). They reached the Elite Eight in 2008 and 2011. In 2011, the Bulls moved from the USF Soccer and Track Stadium to the new Corbett Stadium.

Keifer had a record of 162–84–47 with the Bulls. On November 22, 2016, Kiefer was hired by the NC State Wolfpack men's soccer program.

=== Bob Butehorn era (2017–2025) ===
On December 18, 2016, Bob Butehorn was hired as the head coach for the program. Butehorn previously coached the Florida Gulf Coast Eagles men's soccer program. The Bulls made the NCAA tournament in 2019. After a few disappointing seasons, the Bulls made the conference tournament championship game in 2022 and made the NCAA tournament for the second time under Butehorn's guide, and won a tournament game for the first time since 2012 after a 4–2 victory against Hofstra at Corbett Stadium, and lost in the second round to No. 1 overall seed Kentucky.

=== George Kiefer (2026–) ===
Kiefer was announced as head coach on December 10, 2025, beginning his second tenure with the program (he previously coached USF from 2002 to 2016). He is leading the team for the 2026 season.

== Players ==
=== Current roster ===
As of 21 Sep 2024

Note: Flags indicate national team as defined under FIFA eligibility rules; some limited exceptions apply. Players may hold more than one non-FIFA nationality.

No.	Pos.	Nation	Player
0	GK	USA	Peter Wagner
1	GK	MEX	Jorge Ortega
2	DF	NOR	Mathis Haugen
3	DF	ISL	Dagur Hafthorsson
4	DF	GHA	Issah Hamidu
5	DF	USA	Mikhail Keise
6	MF	USA	Julio Plata
7	MF	SLO	Lovro Kostanjšek
8	MF	USA	Pedro Faife
9	FW	CAY	Gunnar Studenhofft
10	MF	GER	Tim Mason
11	FW	USA	Jalen Anderson
12	FW	GER	John Adekunle
13	MF	USA	Tyler Richardson
14	MF	USA	Marco Astorga

No.	Pos.	Nation	Player
15	MF	CRC	Mauro Gutierrez
16	MF	FRA	Louis Hervouin
17	DF	USA	Nicolas Scargle
18	MF	USA	Asher Jones
19	FW	USA	Michael Luande
20	MF	USA	Michael Owens
21	DF	JAM	Richard Thompson Jr.
23	MF	USA	Marcelo Mondragon
24	FW	USA	Kyle Hunnicutt
26	DF	JAM	Jemone Barclay
27	DF	USA	Davis Scharfeld
30	GK	GER	Felix Schaefer
31	GK	USA	Tim Devine
32	GK	PAR	Diego Garciarena

== Coaching staff ==
As of 21 Sep 2024

Position	Name
Head coach	Bob Butehorn
Assistant coach	Armante' Marshall
Assistant coach	William Chiles
Assistant coach	Luis Vega
Graduate assistant	Kori Cupid

== Fans ==
The main group of student supporters are known as the Goalmouths. They sit on the berm behind whichever goal USF is attacking in that particular half.

== Rivalries ==
USF's main rival is American Athletic Conference foe Central Florida, with whom they compete in the War on I-4. The sides first met in 1974 and the Bulls lead the all-time series at 27–8–4.

The Bulls annually face the crosstown University of Tampa Spartans, an NCAA Division II school, in the preseason Rowdies Cup, which celebrates the city's rich soccer history. The Bulls have a deep connection with the Rowdies, as Corbett Stadium is named after USF alumni and former Rowdies owners (of the original club, not the current one) Dick and Cornelia Corbett. In addition to holding the match trophy until the next match, the winners also get to hoist the actual 1975 Soccer Bowl trophy, which was won by the original Tampa Bay Rowdies. Formerly called the Mayor's Cup until 2005, as of the 2022 edition, USF holds 25–11–3 edge in the all-time series which dates back to 1972.

== Season-by-season results ==
Year	Conference	Games played	Record (W–L–T)	Win percentage	Conference record (W–L–T)	Head coach	Postseason
1965	Independent (National Collegiate)	10	6–4–0	.600	N/A	Dan Holcomb	
1966	Independent (National Collegiate)	11	10–0–1	.955	N/A	Dan Holcomb	
1967	Independent (National Collegiate)	12	10–2–0	.833	N/A	Dan Holcomb	
1968	Independent (National Collegiate)	9	6–2–1	.722	N/A	Dan Holcomb	
1969	Independent (National Collegiate)	10	8–2–0	.800	N/A	Dan Holcomb	NCAA Round of 16
1970	Independent (National Collegiate)	11	7–3–1	.682	N/A	Dan Holcomb	NCAA First Round
1971	Independent (National Collegiate)	10	7–3–0	.700	N/A	Dan Holcomb	NCAA First Round
1972	Independent (College Division)	15	9–4–2	.667	N/A	Dan Holcomb	NCAA Round of 16
1973	Independent (Division I)	13	10–3–0	.769	N/A	Dan Holcomb	NCAA Round of 16
1974	Independent (Division I)	14	6–6–2	.500	N/A	Dan Holcomb	
1975	Independent (Division I)	13	9–3–1	.731	N/A	Dan Holcomb	NCAA First Round
1976	Sun Belt	18	11–6–1	.639	**4–0–0 (Won conference tournament and regular season)**	Dan Holcomb	
1977	Sun Belt	15	10–5–0	.667	**2–1–0 (Won conference tournament)**	Dan Holcomb	
1978	Sun Belt	15	7–7–1	.500	1–2–0	Dan Holcomb	
1979	Sun Belt	18	12–6–0	.667	**3–1–0 (Won conference tournament)**	Dan Holcomb	
1980	Sun Belt	16	14–1–1	.906	**3–0–0 (Won conference tournament and regular season)**	Dan Holcomb	
1981	Sun Belt	15	12–2–1	.833	**3–0–0 (Won conference tournament and regular season)**	Dan Holcomb	
1982	Sun Belt	19	13–3–3	.763	**4–0–0 (Won conference tournament and regular season)**	Dan Holcomb	NCAA First Round
1983	Sun Belt	20	15–4–1	.775	3–0–1 (Won conference regular season)	Dan Holcomb	
1984	Sun Belt	21	13–6–2	.667	3–1–0 (Won conference regular season)	Dan Holcomb	
1985	Sun Belt	20	12–6–2	.650	**3–0–1 (Won conference tournament and regular season)**	Dan Holcomb	
1986	Sun Belt	19	9–8–2	.526	**2–0–1 (Won conference tournament)**	Dan Holcomb	
1987	Sun Belt	18	8–8–2	.500	3–2–1	Jay Miller	
1988	Sun Belt	18	9–7–2	.556	**4–1–1 (Won conference tournament)**	Jay Miller	
1989	Sun Belt	20	9–11–0	.450	2–4–0	Jay Miller	
1990	Sun Belt	17	12–3–2	.765	5–1–1	Jay Miller	
1991	Metro Conference	20	9–5–6	.600	**2–0–2 (Won conference tournament)**	Jay Miller	
1992	Metro Conference	18	13–3–2	.778	2–1–1	Jay Miller	
1993	Metro Conference	16	9–6–1	.594	1–4–0	Jay Miller	
1994	Metro Conference	16	9–7–0	.562	3–2–0	T. Logan Fleck	
1995	Conference USA	14	8–6–0	.571	5–3–0	T. Logan Fleck	
1996	Conference USA	21	17–4–0	.810	**7–1–0 (Won conference tournament and regular season)**	T. Logan Fleck	NCAA First Round
1997	Conference USA	24	14–8–2	.625	5–1–2 (Won conference regular season)	David Christinsen	NCAA Quarterfinal
1998	Conference USA	22	12–8–2	.591	**6–1–1 (Won conference tournament and regular season)**	John Hackworth	NCAA First Round
1999	Conference USA	18	10–8–0	.556	3–5–0	John Hackworth	
2000	Conference USA	19	10–9–0	.526	6–3–0	John Hackworth	
2001	Conference USA	22	15–7–0	.682	7–4–0	John Hackworth	NCAA Second Round
2002	Conference USA	18	11–7–0	.611	6–4–0	George Kiefer	
2003	Conference USA	18	7–8–3	.472	4–3–2	George Kiefer	
2004	Conference USA	17	10–5–2	.647	5–3–1	George Kiefer	
2005	Big East	21	13–6–2	.667	9–2–0 (Won conference regular season)	George Kiefer	NCAA Second Round
2006	Big East	19	9–6–4	.636	1–0–3	George Kiefer	
2007	Big East	22	14–6–2	.680	6–4–1	George Kiefer	NCAA Round of 16
2008	Big East	23	15–5–3	.712	**7–3–1 (Won conference tournament)**	George Kiefer	NCAA Quarterfinal
2009	Big East	21	14–4–3	.729	6–3–2	George Kiefer	NCAA Second Round
2010	Big East	18	9–6–4	.609	4–3–2	George Kiefer	NCAA First Round
2011	Big East	21	13–4–4	.696	7–1–2 (Won conference regular season)	George Kiefer	NCAA Quarterfinal
2012	Big East	19	8–6–5	.548	2–3–3	George Kiefer	NCAA Second Round
2013	American Conference	21	8–4–9	.595	**2–2–4 (Won conference tournament)**	George Kiefer	NCAA First Round
2014	American Conference	20	10–7–3	.575	4–3–1	George Kiefer	
2015	American Conference	19	11–6–3	.625	5–1–2	George Kiefer	NCAA Second Round
2016	American Conference	19	10–6–4	.600	5–1–2 (Won conference regular season)	George Kiefer	NCAA First Round
2017	American Conference	16	6–6–4	.500	3–2–2	Bob Butehorn	
2018	American Conference	17	7–8–2	.471	4–1–2	Bob Butehorn	
2019	American Conference	19	11–7–1	.605	4–3–0	Bob Butehorn	NCAA First Round
2020	American Conference	10	4–6–0	.400	4–6–0	Bob Butehorn	
2021	American Conference	15	6–7–2	.467	4–5–1	Bob Butehorn	
2022	American Conference	20	9–7–4	.550	5–1–3	Bob Butehorn	NCAA Second Round
2023	American Conference	16	6–9–1	.406	3–4–1	Bob Butehorn	
2024	American Conference	16	6–6–4	.500	4–3–0	Bob Butehorn	
Total		1022	594–328–110	.629	195–99–47		23 Appearances (13–20–6 record)
Bold indicates tournament won Italics indicate Conference Championship

*- indicates season in progress, totals will be updated at end of season

=== NCAA tournament results ===
Year	Round	Location	Opponent	Result	Notes
1969	1st round (round of 24)	Annapolis, MD	Navy	**W 1–0**	
1969	2nd round (round of 16)	College Park, MD	Maryland	L 1–4	
1970	1st round (round of 24)	Annapolis, MD	Navy	T 0–0	Navy advances on corner kicks
1971	1st round (round of 24)	Annapolis, MD	Navy	L 1–3	
1972	1st round (round of 24)	Harrisonburg, VA	James Madison	**W 1–0 ^{OT}** (Note: USF's media guide claims the Bulls won 2–1 in overtime, but the NCAA record book says the score was 1–0.)	College Division tournament
1972	2nd round (round of 16)	Baltimore, MD	Baltimore	L 0–1	College Division tournament
1973	1st round (round of 24)	Morgantown, WV	West Virginia	**W 3–1**	
1973	2nd round (round of 16)	Clemson, SC	Clemson	L 0–1 ^{4OT}	
1975	1st round (round of 24)	Clemson, SC	Clemson	L 0–3	
1982	1st round (round of 24)	Durham, NC	Duke	L 1–2	
1996	1st round (round of 32)	Miami, FL	Florida International	L 1–6	
1997	1st round (round of 32)	Miami, FL	Florida International	**W 3–1**	
1997	2nd round (round of 16)	New York, NY	St. John's	**W 2–1**	
1997	Quarterfinals	Bloomington, IN	Indiana	L 0–6	
1998	1st round (round of 32)	Tampa, FL	William & Mary	L 1–2 ^{2OT}	
2001	1st round (round of 48)	Tampa, FL	Akron	**W 2–1**	
2001	2nd round (round of 32)	State College, PA	Penn State	L 0–1 ^{3OT}	
2005	1st round (round of 48)	Tampa, FL	Stetson	**W 3–0**	
2005	2nd round (round of 32)	Charlottesville, VA	Virginia	T 4–4	Virginia advances on PKs, 7–6
2007	1st round (round of 48)	Tampa, FL	Colgate	**W 2–1**	
2007	2nd round (round of 32)	Akron, OH	Akron	**W 1–0** ^{2OT}	
2007	3rd round (round of 16)	Storrs, CT	Connecticut	L 0–5	
2008	2nd round (round of 32)	Tampa, FL	Harvard	**W 2–1**	
2008	3rd round (round of 16)	Tampa, FL	UNC Greensboro	T 1–1	**USF advances on PKs, 3–1**
2008	Quarterfinals	Winston-Salem, NC	Wake Forest	L 0–5	
2009	1st round (round of 48)	Tampa, FL	Stetson	**W 2–1**	
2009	2nd round (round of 32)	Akron, OH	Akron	L 0–2	
2010	1st round (round of 48)	Orlando, FL	UCF	L 0–3	
2011	2nd round (round of 32)	Tampa, FL	UCF	**W 2–1** ^{OT}	
2011	3rd round (round of 16)	Tampa, FL	New Mexico	T 0–0	**USF advances on PKs, 6–5**
2011	Quarterfinals	Omaha, NE	Creighton	L 0–1 ^{OT}	
2012	1st round (round of 48)	Tampa, FL	Florida Gulf Coast	T 0–0	**USF advances on PKs, 5–3**
2012	2nd round (round of 32)	Tampa, FL	Tulsa	L 0–1 OT	
2013	1st round (round of 48)	Chapel Hill, NC	North Carolina	L 0–1	
2015	2nd round (round of 32)	Tampa, FL	Boston College	L 1–2 ^{OT}	
2016	1st round (round of 48)	Tampa, FL	Florida Gulf Coast	T 2–2	FGCU advances on PKs, 3–0
2019	1st round (round of 48)	Louisville, KY	Louisville	L 1–4	
2022	1st round (round of 48)	Tampa, FL	Hofstra	**W 4–2**	
2022	2nd round (round of 32)	Lexington, KY	Kentucky	L 0–4	
Total	23 Appearances			13–20–6	

== Individual honors ==
=== Hermann Trophy finalists ===
- (Republic of Ireland) Fergus Hopper, 1977

=== All Americans ===
==== First team ====
- (United States) Roy Wegerle, 1982, 1983
- (United States) Mike Mekelburg, 1996
- (United States) Jeff Attinella, 2009

==== Second team ====
- (Republic of Ireland) Fergus Hopper, 1975
- (United States) Dom Dwyer, 2011

==== Third team ====
- (United States) Jeff Cunningham, 1996, 1997
- (Trinidad and Tobago) Yohance Marshall, 2008
- (South Africa) Nazeem Bartman, 2015

=== Conference honors ===
==== Player of the decade ====
- Jeff Cunningham, 1990s

==== Player of the year ====
- Tim Geltz, 1991
- Mark Chung, 1992
- Mike Mekleberg, 1996
- Jeff Cunningham, 1997
- Brian Waltrip, 1998
- Dom Dwyer, 2011
- Prosper Figbe, 2016

==== Goalkeeper of the year ====
- Jeff Attinella, 2009
- Spasoje Stefanovic, 2014, 2016

==== First team all conference ====
- Ralph Baker, 1977, 1979
- Fran Lemmons, 1977
- Declan O’Donoghue, 1977, 1978
- Harry Jean-Charles, 1977
- Kyle White, 1978, 1979, 1980, 1981
- Shay Smith, 1978
- Paul Ritter, 1979
- Jesper Pederson, 1979
- Dan Peterson, 1980
- Mike Metzner, 1980
- Nigel Armorer-Clarke, 1980, 1981
- Bob Bauman, 1980
- Hisham Ramzi, 1981
- Jim Peterson, 1981
- Jay White, 1981, 1982
- Roy Wegerle, 1982, 1983
- Johann Westerhorstmann, 1982, 1984
- Ranier Kuhn, 1982
- Garnett Craig, 1982
- Kelvin Jones, 1983, 1984
- Aris Bogdaneris, 1984, 1985, 1986
- Ray Perlee, 1984, 1985, 1986
- Alan Anderson, 1984, 1986, 1987
- David Dodge, 1985
- Giles Hooper, 1987
- Michael Bates, 1988
- Mark Chung, 1989, 1990, 1992
- R.C. Campagnolo, 1989, 1990
- Tim Geltz, 1991
- Ed Carmean, 1991
- Mike Borgard, 1992, 1993, 1994
- Andy Restrepo, 1992
- Jeff Gopsill, 1992
- Oystein Drillestad, 1992, 1993, 1994
- Jeff Cunningham, 1994, 1995, 1996, 1997
- Mike Mekelburg, 1994, 1996
- Harold Ooft, 1994
- Todd Denault, 1996
- Brian Waltrip, 1997, 1998
- Brian Alvero, 1998, 1999
- Kevin Alvero, 1998, 1999
- Jeff Houser, 1998
- Jason Cudjoe, 2001
- Jeff Thwaites, 2001, 2002
- Hunter West, 2002
- Kareem Smith, 2004
- Rodrigo Hidalgo, 2005
- Kevon Neaves, 2007, 2008
- Yohance Marshall, 2008
- Jeff Attinella, 2009
- Dom Dwyer, 2011
- Ben Sweat, 2013
- Lucas Baldin, 2014
- Lindo Mfeka, 2014, 2015, 2016
- Wesley Charpie, 2014
- Spasoje Stefanovic, 2014, 2016
- Nazeem Bartman, 2015, 2016
- Brendan Hines-Ike, 2015
- Prosper Figbe, 2016
- Adrian Billhardt, 2017
- Ricardo Gomez, 2017
- Tomasz Skublak, 2018
- Javain Brown, 2019
- Avionne Flanagan, 2019
- Pedro Faife, 2024

==== Coach of the year ====
- Dan Holcomb, 1976, 1980
- John Hackworth, 1998

=== USF Athletic Hall of Fame members ===
- (United States) Dan Holcomb – Head Coach 1965–86
- (Republic of Ireland) Fergus Hopper – DF 1974–77
- (United States) Matthew O'Neal – FW 2013–14*
- (United States) Jeff Atinella – G 2007–10
- (United States) Jeff Cunningham – FW 1994–97

*Two sport athlete, mainly inducted for his performance with USF's Track and Field team.

=== Players who went on to play professionally ===
- (Venezuela) Bernardo Añor, professional footballer for Sporting Kansas City, currently on loan to Minnesota United FC
- (United States) Jeff Attinella, professional footballer for the Portland Timbers.
- (Brazil) Lucas Baldin, professional footballer for Deportivo Lara.
- (England) Tyler Blackwood, professional footballer for Oakland Roots.
- (United States) Peter Chandler, veteran of USMNT, played professionally in the original NASL.
- (United States) Wesley Charpie, professional footballer for Louisville City FC.
- (United States) Mark Chung, veteran of USMNT, played professionally in MLS for 10 years.
- (United States) Jeff Cunningham, veteran of USMNT, played professionally in MLS for 15 years.
- (United States) Dom Dwyer, professional footballer who most recently played for Toronto FC and has also played for the USMNT.
- (United States) Kevin Eagan, played professionally in the original NASL.
- (United States) Tom Fitzgerald, NCAA winning soccer coach and MLS coach.
- (United States) Brendan Hines-Ike, professional footballer for D.C. United.
- Dallas Jaye, professional footballer for Greenville Triumph & Guam national football team.
- (Trinidad and Tobago) Yohance Marshall, professional footballer who most recently played for Icelandic club Kórdrengir.
- (Canada) Nikola Paunic, professional footballer for Orange County Blues FC.
- (United States) Troy Perkins, veteran of USMNT, played professionally in MLS for 10 years.
- (United States) Diego Restrepo, professional footballer for Austin Bold FC.
- (Serbia) Neven Subotić, professional footballer for SCR Altach.
- (United States) Ben Sweat, record appearance holder for South Florida Men's soccer, professional footballer for New York City FC.
- (United States) Roy Wegerle, veteran of 1994 and 1998 World Cup for USMNT, played professionally in the original NASL, EPL and MLS.
- (United States) Anthony Wallace, capped once by the USMNT, plays professionally for OKC Energy FC.

== Media ==
Under the current American Conference TV deal, all home and in-conference away men's soccer games are shown on one of the various ESPN networks or streamed live on ESPN+. Live radio broadcasts of games are also available worldwide for free on the Bulls Unlimited digital radio station on TuneIn.

== See also ==
- South Florida Bulls women's soccer
- South Florida Bulls
- University of South Florida
