= Kristen Scott =

American soccer player (born 2000)

Personal information
- Full name: Kristen Ann Scott
- Date of birth: August 24, 2000 (age 26)
- Place of birth: Orlando, Florida, U.S.
- Height: 5 ft 9 in (1.75 m)
- Position: Forward

Youth career
- Orlando Pride

College career
Years	Team	Apps	(Gls)
2018–2022	UCF Knights	72	(33)

Senior career*
Years	Team	Apps	(Gls)
2023–2024	AS Saint-Étienne	0	(0)
- * Club domestic league appearances and goals as of 22:19, June 27, 2026 (UTC)

Kristen Ann Scott (born August 24, 2000) is an American former professional soccer player who played as a forward. She played college soccer for the UCF Knights, where she was named the American Athletic Conference Offensive Player of the Year in 2022. She was selected in the 2023 NWSL Draft by the Orlando Pride before playing one professional season with French club AS Saint-Étienne.

== Early life ==
Scott was born in Orlando, Florida, to Lillian Scott Payne and Jeff Scott. She attended Edgewater High School, where her father, Jeff, taught physics. Scott had a successful four years academically, graduating as the 2018 class Valedictorian and landing a spot on the National Honor Society. On the soccer field, she was an all-metro selection in her sophomore year. Scott also played soccer outside of school for the Orlando Pride's youth club. She helped the Pride qualify for the Elite Clubs National League national playoffs on two separate occasions.

== College career ==
As a freshman with the UCF Knights, Scott was named to the 2018 American Athletic Conference All-rookie team after starting all 18 of UCF's games and ranking second on the team with 6 goals. The following year, she had an 8-goal season, including a four-match goal streak, and was named second-team all-conference. After participating in the 2021 spring campaign, which had been postponed and shortened due to the COVID-19 pandemic, Scott put on a fall season in which she scored 10 goals and earned her first-ever first-team all-AAC honor.

Scott returned to UCF for a fifth year, taking advantage of the extra season of NCAA eligibility offered to student-athletes after the pandemic. She missed all of September 2022 due to injury, watching from the sidelines as the Knights went winless in four. Upon returning to the field, Scott scored 5 goals in a single week and led UCF to finish the season with a seven-match win streak. On October 23, 2022, she scored the lone goal against Houston to clinch the AAC regular-season title for the Knights. She then participated in both of UCF's NCAA tournament games as the Knights were eliminated in the second round by eventual champions UCLA. At the end of the season, Scott was named first-team all-AAC once again after recording 5 assists and a conference-leading 9 goals. She was also named the AAC Offensive Player of the Year. She departed from the program with 33 goals, which tied her for sixth all-time in UCF history.

== Club career ==
Scott was selected in the fourth round of the 2023 NWSL Draft (41st overall) by the Orlando Pride, whose youth teams she had previously played for as an adolescent. She attended the Pride's preseason camp, but was the only one of the Pride's five 2023 draftees to not sign a contract with the team.

On July 21, 2023, Scott signed her first professional contract with French side AS Saint-Étienne ahead of the club's first season in the Division 1 Féminine after gaining promotion from the second division. The move reconnected her with Saint-Étienne captain Élise Legrout, with whom she had played alongside at UCF. Scott did not make any appearances for Saint-Étienne before her contract expired at the end of the 2023–24 season.

== Personal life ==
Scott graduated from the University of Central Florida with a Bachelor's degree in finance. After her spell in the world of professional soccer, she has gone on to pursue an MBA and Master's degree in Sports Business Management at UCF while also working for finance company Northwestern Mutual.

== Honors and awards ==
UCF Knights

- American Athletic Conference: 2022

Individual

- First-team All-AAC: 2021, 2022
- Second-team All-AAC: 2019
- AAC All-freshman team: 2018
- AAC Offensive Player of the Year: 2022
