= Chyanne Dennis =

Jamaican footballer (born 1999)

Personal information
- Full name: Chyanne Ashley Dennis
- Date of birth: April 9, 1999 (age 27)
- Place of birth: Sunrise, Florida
- Height: 1.80 m (5 ft 11 in)
- Position: Defender

Team information
- Current team: Afturelding

College career
Years	Team	Apps	(Gls)
2017–2020	South Florida Bulls	55	(0)

Senior career*
Years	Team	Apps	(Gls)
2022–	Afturelding		

International career
- United States U17
2018	Jamaica U20	2	(0)
2018–	Jamaica	4	(0)
- * Club domestic league appearances and goals as of 12 May 2020

Chyanne Ashley Dennis (born April 9, 1999) is a footballer who plays as a defender for the Jamaica women's national team.

== Early life ==
Born to Georgiana Freckleton and Errol Dennis, Chyanne was raised in Florida and participated in many sports as a youth. She attended three camps for the United States women's national under-17 soccer team. She attended American Heritage School where she captained the team to state championships twice. She also played for Florida's Olympic Development (ODP) team for two years.

== Playing career ==
=== College ===
Dennis has attended the University of South Florida since 2017 and plays on the South Florida Bulls women's soccer team. Her freshman year, Dennis started in 13 of the 17 games she played and contributed to the Bulls setting a school record of eight shutouts. Playing as a defender, she recorded seven shots and one assist. During her sophomore season, she was a starting defender in 14 of the 17 games that she played and helped the team record seven shutouts.

=== International ===
After training with the United States women's national under-17 soccer team during three training camps, Dennis shifted to the Jamaica under-20 national team and competed at the 2018 CONCACAF Women's U-20 Championship. She earned two caps with the squad playing a total of 180 minutes. The same year, she earned three caps with the senior national team at the 2018 CONCACAF Women's Gold Cup, the qualifying tournament for the 2019 FIFA Women's World Cup, and helped the team place third at the Gold Cup and qualify for the first time for a World Cup tournament. In May 2019, she was called up to the squad ahead of the team's last international friendly (against Panama) before the World Cup.

== Personal life ==
Dennis is majoring in business management at the University of South Florida.
