= South Florida Bulls women's basketball =

American collegiate women's basketball team

2026–27 South Florida Bulls women's basketball team
- University: University of South Florida
- First season: 1972–73; 54 years ago
- Athletic director: Rob Higgins
- Head coach: Kristy Curry (1st season)
- Location: Tampa, Florida
- Arena: Yuengling Center (capacity: 10,411)
- Conference: The American
- Nickname: Bulls
- Colors: Green and gold
- Student section: So Flo Rodeo

NCAA Division I tournament second round
- 2013, 2015, 2016, 2021, 2023

NCAA Division I tournament appearances
- 2006, 2013, 2015, 2016, 2017, 2018, 2021, 2022, 2023, 2025

Conference tournament champions
- 2021, 2025

Conference regular-season champions
- 2021, 2023

WNIT champions
- 2009

Uniforms
Home	Away	Alternate

The South Florida Bulls women's basketball team represents the University of South Florida in women's basketball. The Bulls compete in the American Conference in Division I of the National Collegiate Athletic Association (NCAA). The Bulls play home basketball games at the Yuengling Center. South Florida is coached by Kristy Curry, who was named the Bulls' head coach in March 2026 following the departure of Jose Fernandez, who had coached the team since the 2000–01 season. USF has made the NCAA Division I women's basketball tournament nine times in their history (2006, 2013, 2015, 2016, 2017, 2018, 2021, 2022, 2023, and 2025) and won the Women's National Invitation Tournament in 2009. They have won four conference championships, taking the regular season American Conference title in 2021 and 2023 and the American Conference tournament crown in 2021 and 2025.

== Season-by-season record ==
As of the 2021–22 season, the Bulls have a 711–699 record. They have made the NCAA Tournament eight times, along with nine appearances in the Women's National Invitation Tournament, including a title in 2009.

Year	Conference	Games played	Record	Win percentage	Conference record	Head coach	Postseason
1972–73	Independent (AIAW Small College)	13	10–3	.769	N/A	Joanne Rodgers	
1973–74	Independent (AIAW Large College Division)	18	9–9	.500	N/A	Joanne Rodgers	
1974–75	Independent (AIAW Large College Division)	24	13–9	.542	N/A	Joanne Rodgers	
1975–76	Independent (AIAW Large College Division)	20	8–12	.400	N/A	Joanne Rodgers	
1976–77	Independent (AIAW Large College Division)	19	15–4	.789	N/A	Joanne Rodgers	
1977–78	Independent (AIAW Large College Division)	26	16–10	.615	N/A	Joanne Rodgers	
1978–79	Independent (AIAW Large College Division)	24	10–14	.417	N/A	Joanne Rodgers	
1979–80	Independent (AIAW Large College Division)	22	9–13	.409	N/A	Joanne Rodgers	
1980–81	Independent (AIAW Large College Division)	31	9–22	.290	N/A	Joanne Rodgers	
1981–82	Independent (AIAW Large College Division)	27	12–15	.444	N/A	Joanne Rodgers	
1982–83	Independent (NCAA Division I)	25	9–16	.360	N/A	Joanne Rodgers	
1983–84	Independent (NCAA Division I)	27	7–20	.259	N/A	Anne Strusz	
1984–85	Sun Belt Conference	26	8–18	.308	0–6	Anne Strusz	
1985–86	Sun Belt Conference	27	5–22	.185	0–6	Anne Strusz	
1986–87	Sun Belt Conference	27	11–16	.407	1–5	Anne Strusz	
1987–88	Sun Belt Conference	27	11–16	.407	1–5	Anne Strusz	
1988–89	Sun Belt Conference	27	14–13	.519	2–4	Trudi Lacey	
1989–90	Sun Belt Conference	27	10–17	.370	0–6	Trudi Lacey	
1990–91	Sun Belt Conference	28	12–16	.429	0–6	Trudi Lacey	
1991–92	Metro Conference	28	13–15	.464	3–9	Trudi Lacey	
1992–93	Metro Conference	27	10–17	.370	0–12	Trudi Lacey	
1993–94	Metro Conference	27	14–13	.519	7–5	Trudi Lacey	
1994–95	Metro Conference	26	7–19	.269	0–12	Trudi Lacey	
1995–96	Conference USA	27	6–21	.222	2–12	Trudi Lacey	
1996–97	Conference USA	27	9–18	.333	5–9	Jerry Ann Winters	
1997–98	Conference USA	29	11–18	.379	5–11	Jerry Ann Winters	
1998–99	Conference USA	27	14–13	.519	8–8	Jerry Ann Winters	
1999–2000	Conference USA	29	13–16	.448	3–13	Jerry Ann Winters	
2000–01	Conference USA	28	4–24	.143	1–15	Jose Fernandez	
2001–02	Conference USA	27	13–13	.519	4–10	Jose Fernandez	
2002–03	Conference USA	27	7–20	.259	2–12	Jose Fernandez	
2003–04	Conference USA	29	14–15	.483	7–7	Jose Fernandez	WNIT (first round)
2004–05	Conference USA	32	21–11	.656	9–5	Jose Fernandez	WNIT (second round)
2005–06	Big East	31	19–12	.613	9–7	Jose Fernandez	NCAA (round of 64)
2006–07	Big East	33	21–12	.636	9–7	Jose Fernandez	WNIT (second round)
2007–08	Big East	32	16–16	.500	5–11	Jose Fernandez	WNIT (first round)
2008–09	Big East	37	27–10	.730	8–8	Jose Fernandez	**WNIT (champions)**
2009–10	Big East	31	15–16	.484	6–10	Jose Fernandez	WNIT (first round)
2010–11	Big East	31	12–19	.387	3–13	Jose Fernandez	
2011–12	Big East	35	19–16	.543	8–8	Jose Fernandez	WNIT (third round)
2012–13	Big East	33	22–11	.667	9–7	Jose Fernandez	NCAA (round of 32)
2013–14	American Conference	36	23–13	.639	13–5	Jose Fernandez	WNIT (Final Four)
2014–15	American Conference	35	27–8	.771	15–3	Jose Fernandez	NCAA (round of 32)
2015–16	American Conference	34	24–10	.706	14–4	Jose Fernandez	NCAA (round of 32)
2016–17	American Conference	33	24–9	.727	11–5	Jose Fernandez	NCAA (round of 64)
2017–18	American Conference	34	26–8	.765	13–3	Jose Fernandez	NCAA (round of 64)
2018–19	American Conference	35	19–16	.523	7–9	Jose Fernandez	WNIT (second round)
2019–20	American Conference	32	19–13	.594	10–6	Jose Fernandez	Postseason not played due to COVID-19 pandemic
2020–21	American Conference	23	19–4	.826	**13–2**	Jose Fernandez	NCAA (round of 32)
2021–22	American Conference	33	24–9	.727	12–3	Jose Fernandez	NCAA (round of 64)
2022–23	American Conference	34	27–7	.794	14–1	Jose Fernandez	NCAA (round of 32)
2023–24	American Conference	33	19–14	.576	10–8	Jose Fernandez	
Total		1477	757–720	.512	271–313		18 appearances (19–17 record)
Bold indicates conference tournament won; Italics indicate regular season conference champions

== Postseason results ==
=== NCAA tournament ===
The Bulls have made the NCAA Division I women's basketball tournament ten times in their history and have an overall record of 5–10.

Year	Seed	Round	Opponent	Result
2006	#9	First Round	#8 USC	L 65–67
2013	#10	First Round; Second Round	#7 Texas Tech #2 California	W 71–70; L 78–82 (OT)
2015	#6	First Round; Second Round	#11 LSU #3 Louisville	W 73–64; L 52–60
2016	#6	First Round; Second Round	#11 Colorado State #3 UCLA	W 48–45; L 67–72
2017	#11	First Round	#6 Missouri	L 64–66
2018	#6	First Round	#11 Buffalo	L 79–102
2021	#8	First Round; Second Round	#9 Washington State #1 NC State	W 57–53; L 67–79
2022	#9	First Round	#8 Miami (FL)	L 66–78
2023	#8	First Round; Second Round	#9 Marquette #1 South Carolina	W 67–65; L 45–76
2025	#12	First Round	#5 Tennessee	L 66–101

=== WNIT ===
The Bulls have made the Women's National Invitation Tournament 9 times. They have an overall record of 14–8 and won the tournament in 2009.

Year	Round	Opponent	Result
2004	First	@ Richmond	L 63–55
2005	First Second	Florida @ Wake Forest	W 61–56 L 78–63
2007	Second Third	Coppin State @ Virginia	W 66–49 L 73–72
2008	First	@ Florida Gulf Coast	L 67–65
2009	Second Third Quarterfinal Final Four Championship	Florida Gulf Coast Ole Miss @ St. Bonaventure @ Boston College @ Kansas	W 88–81 (OT) W 74–67 W 80–66 W 82–65 W 75–71
2010	First	@ Florida	L 61–54
2012	First Second Third	Florida Atlantic Florida International James Madison	W 76–20 W 77–61 L 72–45
2014	First Second Third Quarterfinal Final Four	North Carolina A&T Stetson George Washington @ Mississippi State Rutgers	W 56–50 W 75–56 W 74–59 W 60–58 L 62–52
2019	First Second	Stetson @ James Madison	W 84–50 L 71–54

== Awards and recognition ==
=== Players ===
==== All Americans ====
- Jessica Dickson (Honorable Mention 2005–06)
- Jessica Dickson (Honorable Mention 2006–07)
- Andrea Smith (Honorable Mention 2012–13)
- Courtney Williams (Honorable Mention 2013–14)
- Courtney Williams (Honorable Mention 2014–15)
- Courtney Williams (Honorable Mention 2015–16)
- Kitija Laksa (Honorable Mention, 2016–17)
- Maria Jespersen (Honorable Mention, 2017–18)

==== WNIT Most Valuable Player ====
- Shantia Grace (2009)

==== Conference Player of the Year ====
- Wanda Guyton (Sun Belt, 1988–89)
- Dulcy Fankam-Mendjiadeu (American, 2022–23) (Note: Fankam-Mendjiadeu and Tsineke were named Co-Players of the 2022–23 season.)
- Elena Tsineke (American, 2022–23)

==== First team all conference ====
- Wanda Guyton (Sun Belt, 1988–89)
- Angie Snyder (Sun Belt, 1990–91)
- Angie Snyder (Metro, 1991–92)
- Tammy van Oppen (Metro, 1993–94)
- Jessica Dickson (Conference USA, 2004–05)
- Jessica Dickson (Big East, 2005–06)
- Jessica Dickson (Big East, 2006–07)
- Shantia Grace (Big East, 2008–09)
- Jessica Lawson (Big East, 2008–09)
- Andrea Smith (Big East, 2012–13)
- Courtney Williams (American, 2013–14)
- Courtney Williams (American, 2014–15)
- Courtney Williams (American, 2015–16)
- Kitija Laksa (American, 2016–17)
- Maria Jespersen (American, 2016–17)
- Maria Jespersen (American, 2017–18)
- Bethy Mununga (American, 2020–21)
- Elena Tsineke (American, 2020–21)

==== In the WNBA ====
- Courtney Williams
- Inga Orekhova
- Andrea Smith
- Jessica Dickson
- Wanda Guyton

==== USF Athletic Hall of Fame ====
- Wanda Guyton (2009)
- Jessica Dickson (2012)
- Shantia Grace (2019)
- Courtney Williams (2020)

==== Retired jerseys ====
South Florida Bulls retired jerseys
Number	Player	Years
3	Shantia Grace	2005–2009
10	Courtney Williams	2012–2015
25	Jessica Dickson	2003–2007
50	Wanda Guyton	1984–1989

=== Coaches ===
==== Conference Coach of the Year ====
- Trudi Lacey (Sun Belt, 1988–89)
- Jose Fernandez (American, 2017–18)
- Jose Fernandez (American, 2020–21)

== Media ==
Under the current American Conference TV deal, all home and in-conference away women's basketball games are shown on one of the various ESPN networks or streamed live on ESPN+. Live radio broadcasts of games are featured on WRBQ 104.7 FM in the Tampa Bay and Southwest Florida media markets, and are also available worldwide for free on the Bulls Unlimited digital radio station on TuneIn.

== See also ==
- South Florida Bulls
- South Florida Bulls men's basketball
