= University of South Florida athletic facilities =

College sports facilities in Florida, U.S.

The University of South Florida athletic facilities are the stadiums and arenas the South Florida Bulls use for their home games and training. The University of South Florida currently sponsors 19 varsity athletic teams and has 11 facilities in the designated Athletics District on or adjacent to its Tampa campus, one on its St. Petersburg campus, and one elsewhere in Tampa. 18 of the 19 teams have some sort of facility in the USF Athletics District.

== The Claw ==
The Claw was the home golf course used by the USF men's and women's golf teams, and was also used by the men's and women's cross country teams. It was located across Fletcher Avenue from USF's main campus in Tampa. The course was named for a tree on the 14th hole with a large, claw-shaped branch. The Chowdhari Golf Practice Center is also located at The Claw.

The Claw was also open to the public and is described as one of the most challenging golf courses in the Tampa Bay area.

The Claw closed on September 5, 2023, due to massive annual losses and disrepair.

== Corbett Stadium ==
Corbett Stadium is home to the Bulls men's and women's soccer teams. It has over 1,000 seats, plus space for over 3,000 more on the grassy berms that surround the field. Corbett Stadium opened in 2011 and replaced USF Track and Field Stadium as home to the USF soccer teams. Corbett Stadium also hosts the USF football team's annual spring game. The stadium is named after Dick and Cornelia Corbett, both of whom are USF alumni, who at one time owned the original Tampa Bay Rowdies. It is adjacent to the Lee Roy Selmon Athletic Center and Frank Morsani Football Practice Complex.

The stadium's amenities include:

- On-field player seating consists of 30 individual padded chairs on elevated tiers for each team
- Berm seating behind both goals
- Direct passage between stadium and USF Athletics Training Facility
- Air-conditioned press box with panoramic windows
- Dedicated broadcast booth in press box
- Video Board
- Dual ticket office and concession locations
- Welcoming landscape design
- Display cases highlighting history of the original Tampa Bay Rowdies, including the Soccer Bowl '75 trophy
- Complex is enclosed by ornamental fence with the remaining three sides enclosed by decorative pilasters and fencing
- End zone environmental graphics highlighting the Bulls success
- Overlooking views from the Lee Roy Selmon Athletics Center administrative offices and weight room
- Musco Sports Lighting System equipment for television broadcast specifications

Corbett Stadium will be the home for USF's women's lacrosse team when they begin play during the 2024–25 school year. This is planned to be a temporary arrangement and the lacrosse team will eventually have its own stadium.

== The Corral ==
The Corral is used by the USF volleyball team and is connected to the Yuengling Center. The smaller arena has two entrances: one separate from the Yuengling Center entrances (albeit adjacent to Gate A) and one which it shares with Gate D of the main arena. It spans 11,500 square feet with a capacity of up to 1,000 fans. The Corral opened after a $5 million renovation in 1995. Prior to this the volleyball team played in the USF Gymnasium, now called the Campus Recreation Center.

== Donald A. Haney Landing Sailing Center ==
The Donald A. Haney Landing Sailing Center is USF's only athletic facility on their St. Petersburg campus, located on Bayboro Harbor in Tampa Bay. It opened in 1997 with the creation of the varsity women's sailing team. The center is used both for practice and for hosting meets. Sailing classes are available to both students and the general public through the center. The facility is named after the late former USF St. Petersburg Student Services Director, who was a sailing enthusiast.

== Raymond James Stadium ==
The USF football team plays at Raymond James Stadium, home to the NFL's Tampa Bay Buccaneers. USF is one of only five FBS teams to play their home games in a current NFL stadium (the others being Miami, Temple, Pitt, and UNLV). Raymond James Stadium is located 13 miles away from the Tampa campus. The stadium has a capacity of more than 75,000 fans including a 12,000 seat student section in the north end zone, making it the largest stadium and largest student section in the American Athletic Conference when at full capacity, but seating for most games is limited to the 100 and 200 levels which brings the total capacity down to around 45,000 (though the student section still has a 12,000 seat capacity for all games).

In early 2016, the stadium was given an extensive facelift. The most notable improvement was the replacement of the 2,200-square-foot (200 m^{2}) video displays with state of the art, high visibility 9,600-square-foot (890 m^{2}) video displays in both the north and south end zones along with the addition of a new 2,300-square-foot (210 m^{2}) video tower in each corner. The original sound system and the stadium's luxury boxes were also upgraded.

USF is in the process of constructing a smaller, on-campus stadium with a capacity around 40,000 with a scheduled opening for the 2027 NCAA Season.

== USF Baseball/Softball Complex ==
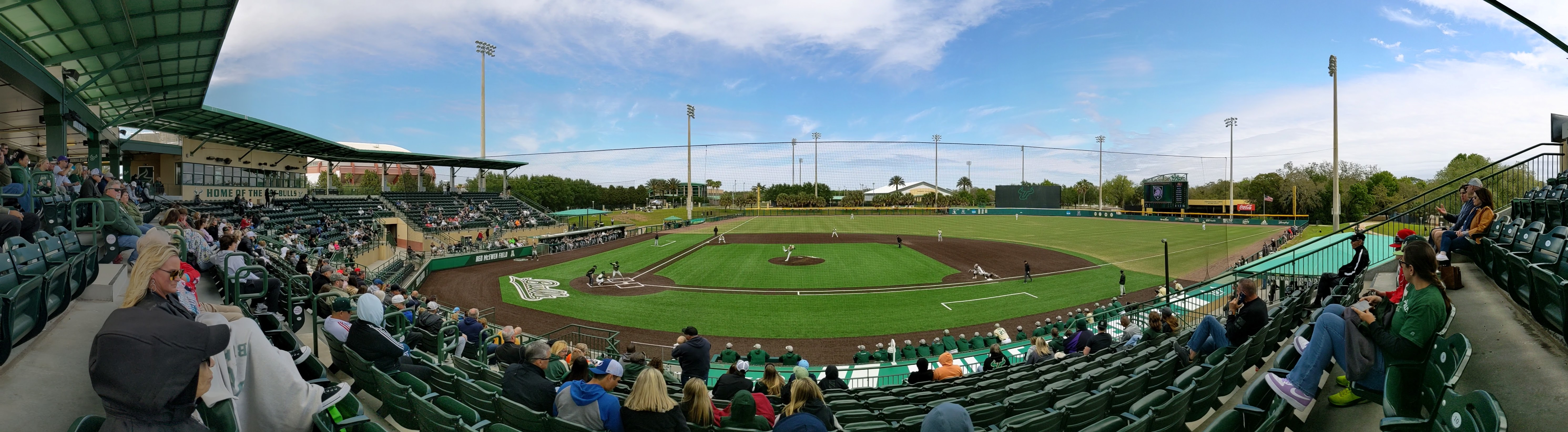
Panorama of the USF Baseball Stadium

The shared baseball and softball complex opened in 2011 after the baseball team's old Red McEwen Field was reconfigured (home plate in the new stadium moved to where right field was in the original stadium) to add space for a new softball field adjacent to the baseball field. The stadiums share an entrance, concourse, and the Donaldson Deck, a party deck where fans can view both fields at the same time. The shared entrance is adjacent to the Yuengling Center from the other side of Bull Run Drive and the baseball stadium is across Elm Drive from Corbett Stadium and the Lee Roy Selmon Athletic Center.

=== USF Baseball Stadium at Red McEwen Field ===
The baseball stadium includes step-down team dugouts, bullpens, covered batting cages, a press box and a 1,500 seat spectator grandstand with a shade canopy, an elevated, shaded hospitality deck and service amenities. The overall capacity of the stadium is 3,211 and is designed to accommodate additional seating that will enable USF to host NCAA Regionals and Super Regionals (the NCAA requires a capacity of at least 3,000 for a stadium to host baseball regionals and super regionals; the old stadium only had a capacity of 2,500).

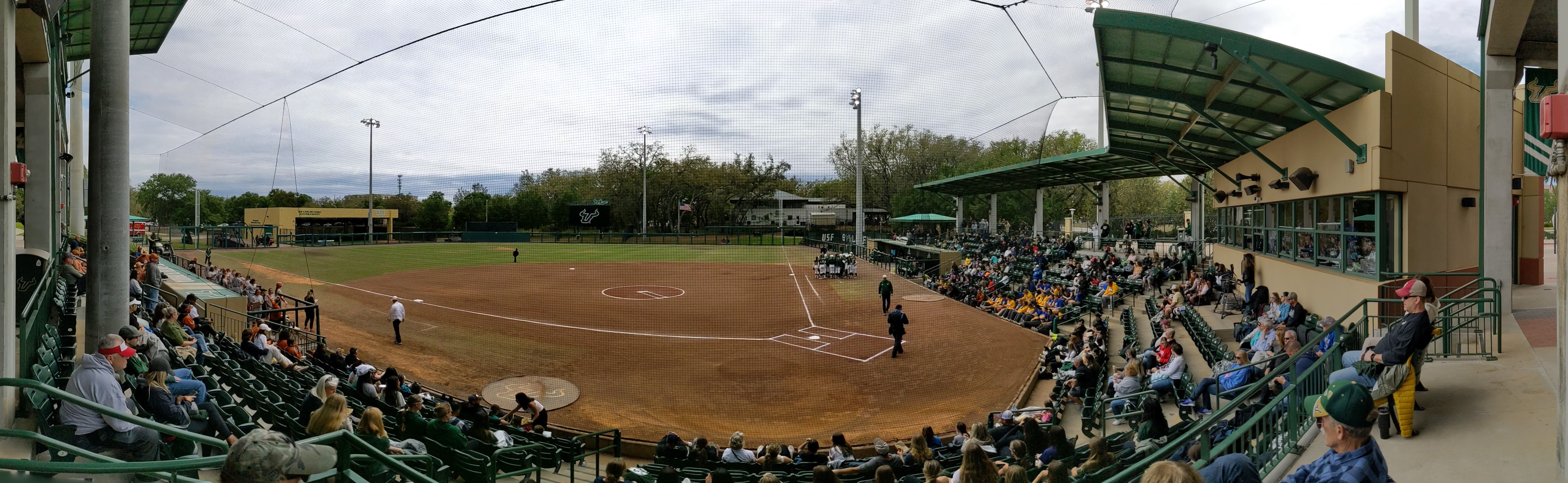
Panorama of the USF Softball Stadium

=== USF Softball Stadium ===
The softball stadium is directly south of the baseball stadium and has 800 seats, plus space for over 800 additional fans on the berms surrounding the field. It also hosts the USF Softball Hall of Fame, which is separate from the USF Athletic Hall of Fame. Softball is USF's only sport with the distinction of its own hall of fame. The playing field is 190 feet in left and right field, 210 feet in left-center and right-center, and 230 feet in center.

== USF Track and Field Stadium ==
The USF Track and Field Stadium was built off of Genshaft Drive (originally Maple Drive) in 1978 to host the Bulls men's soccer team. It hosted the men's soccer team from 1978 until 2010 and the women's soccer team from its inaugural season in 1995 to 2010. It is currently used by the Bulls men's and women's outdoor track & field teams, and has been since they were founded 1991. The 4,000-seat stadium has hosted several events throughout the years including Lamar Hunt US Open Cup matches, the Conference USA and Big East soccer tournaments for both men and women, the NCAA Men's Soccer Championship semifinals and final in 1990 and 1991, and C-USA and American Athletic Conference track and field championships on multiple occasions. The track was remodeled in 2008 to include a new state-of-the-art Mondo surface. It is the same surface used at the Olympic Games and is considered the fastest, safest and most durable track surface in the world.

== USF Varsity Tennis Courts ==
The USF Varsity Tennis complex was established at its current location at the corner of Holly Drive and Genshaft Drive in 1977 with six courts. It has seen numerous improvements since its conception, with several changes and additions. In 1996, six new hard courts were added, making a total of 12, which allowed convenient practice and match scheduling to accommodate both the men's and women's tennis teams. In 2012 a new surface was installed on each of the courts, and a new grandstand was added in the center of the complex which can view each of the courts at once. All 12 courts are individually fenced in to prevent interruption of play.

== Yuengling Center ==
The Yuengling Center, formerly known as the USF Sun Dome, serves as the home to the USF men's and women's basketball teams and has since 1980. It is also used for USF's commencement ceremonies. The 55,000 square foot multipurpose facility, which includes a 10,500-seat basketball arena and the adjacent volleyball arena (the Corral), has seen over $43 million in renovations since 2000, including replacement of the original Teflon inflatable roof with a permanent structure, and numerous interior upgrades and improvements. The building is LEED Silver certified.

The arena hosts approximately 300 different events each year, including sporting events, concerts, home and garden shows, trade shows, religious services and conventions, ethnic festivals, rodeos, bull riding competitions, youth sports camps, professional wrestling, boxing, taekwondo tournaments, gymnastics and cheerleading competitions, commencement ceremonies, lectures and political rallies among other corporate, community and university events.

On June 12, 2018, USF announced that the D.G Yuengling & Son Brewing Company had purchased the naming rights to the facility and renamed it the Yuengling Center, effective July 1, 2018. Yuengling has a brewery roughly two miles from the USF Tampa campus. The deal is slated for 10 years.

== Practice and other facilities ==
=== Recreation Center ===
Located on the University of South Florida Campus near the Yuengling Center, Athletics District, and Student Health & Wellness Center, the Recreation Center is a 189,681 square foot facility that welcomes more than 300,000 visitors each year.The Recreation Center is mainly used as a gym for University of South Florida's students, faculty, and staff. Community members are now able to access the facilities when previously a sponsor was required.

The center, at the time called the USF Gymnasium, was also the home of the USF women's volleyball team from their first season (1972) until The Corral opened in 1995, plus the USF women's basketball team from their founding in 1972 until the Sun Dome opened in 1980, as well as during the 2011–12 season when the arena underwent renovations. It also hosted three men's basketball games in the 1978–79 season. When configured for USF basketball games, there is space for around 1,500 fans.

=== Chowdhari Golf Practice Center ===
The Chowdhari Golf Practice Center is an indoor training center located at The Claw which includes a simulator and access to a driving range. The facility opened in 2013 and is one of USF's six LEED certified buildings. It is named for the donors of the project: USF Foundation Board Member Dr. Shaukat Chowdhari and his wife, Dr. Antonina Chowdhari, whose son Adam played for the men's golf team.

=== Frank Morsani Football Practice Complex ===
The $4 million Frank Morsani Football Practice Complex opened in 2011 and features three full size fields, two made of natural grass and one made of artificial FieldTurf, plus an additional 40-yard turf area for drills.

In February 2021, USF announced plans to add an indoor practice facility to the complex. The facility, called the Porter Family Indoor Performance Facility, was completed in fall 2022. Highlights of the facility include:

- A full size turf field
- 12,000 square foot strength and conditioning center
- 10,000 square foot football locker room
- Players’ lounge and adjacent social patio
- Team auditorium with tiered seating
- Sports medicine and rehabilitation facility
- Nutrition center
- 12,000 square feet of team and position meeting spaces
- Coaches and staff offices
- Equipment room, video operations, laundry and other support operations

The indoor performance facility is also used by other teams, including women's lacrosse.

=== Lee Roy Selmon Athletic Center ===
Opened in 2004, the Lee Roy Selmon Athletic Center is the main hub for USF Athletics. In 2012, the facility was dedicated to the late Lee Roy Selmon, a Pro Football Hall of Fame member who played for the Tampa Bay Buccaneers and former Director of USF Athletics. Selmon is considered as the "Father of USF Football". The 104,000 square foot facility houses all USF sports teams, except for men's and women's basketball, sailing, and volleyball. The building features a large strength and conditioning center; a sports medicine clinic; the USF Athletic Hall of Fame; coaches offices; locker rooms for men's and women's soccer, baseball, softball, and football; most of the athletic department's trophy room (though some teams' trophies are kept at their own facilities); and an Academic Enrichment Center complete with a computer study lab, a library, study lounges, and academic counseling.

=== Pam and Les Muma Basketball Center ===
The basketball practice center opened in 2011 as a two-story, 51,000 square foot facility that provides both the USF men's and women's basketball teams with their own practice courts overlooked by the coaches' office, locker rooms, offices, film rooms, and player lounges, plus offering a shared training room and strength and conditioning facilities. The facility also has: conference rooms, a 4,100 square foot multi purpose area, and an underground tunnel with direct access to the Yuengling Center.
