= South Florida Bulls women's soccer =

American college soccer team

- Founded: 1995; 31 years ago
- University: University of South Florida
- Athletic director: Michael Kelly
- Head coach: Chris Brown (1st season)
- Conference: The American
- Location: Tampa, Florida, US
- Stadium: Corbett Stadium (capacity: 4,000)
- Nickname: Bulls
- Colors: Green and gold
Home	Away

NCAA tournament Round of 16
- 2019

NCAA tournament Round of 32
- 2010, 2017, 2018, 2019, 2020

NCAA tournament appearances
- 2010, 2014, 2015, 2017, 2018, 2019, 2020

Conference tournament championships
- 2017, 2019, 2020

Conference regular season championships
- 1998, 2018, 2020, 2021

The South Florida Bulls women's soccer team represents the University of South Florida in the sport of soccer. The Bulls currently compete in the American Conference within Division I of the National Collegiate Athletic Association. The Bulls play in Corbett Stadium along with USF's men's soccer team, which opened in 2011. Prior to that, they played at what is now the USF Track and Field Stadium.

The Bulls have reached the NCAA tournament seven times and have won seven combined regular season and tournament conference championships.

== History ==
=== T. Logan Fleck era (1995–2006) ===
USF's women's soccer team was founded in 1995, exactly 30 years after the men's soccer team began play as the first sports team in USF history. The first women's soccer coach in USF history was T. Logan Fleck, who also served as USF's men's soccer coach from 1994 to 1996. The program got off to a good start under Fleck and went 11–3 in its first season, including nine shutouts. The inaugural team contained no scholarship players and mainly played Division II opponents, but still defeated three Division I teams.

The team then entered a rough patch after joining the rest of USF's sports teams in Conference USA in 1996, finishing 6–11–1 overall and 2–7 against in conference opponents. The Bulls turned it around and won the regular season C-USA title in just their third season in the conference and fourth season of existence going 9–0–2 against conference foes and 15–1–3 overall, but lost to Marquette in the Conference USA tournament championship game. The Bulls would never again come near a Conference USA championship, falling as low as 1–8–1 in conference games in 2001 and leaving for the Big East in 2005. Fleck was fired following the Bulls 2006 campaign finishing 6–10–1.

=== Denise Schilte-Brown era (2006–present) ===
Denise Schilte-Brown was hired to replace T. Logan Fleck as the Bulls head coach in December 2006. But USF continued to struggle in the Big East, finishing with a winning record against conference foes just three times. USF made the NCAA Tournament for the first time in 2010 after a 11–4–3 regular season and reaching the Big East Tournament Championship game where they fell to West Virginia 1–0. The Bulls won their first ever NCAA Tournament game by upsetting highly favored Auburn 3–1 in the first round then fell to No. 2 seed Florida State 2–1 in round two.

After the Big East Conference realignment in the early 2010s, USF became a member of the American Athletic Conference (now known as the American Conference) starting in the 2013 season. The Bulls quickly found success in their new conference behind goalkeeper Christiane Endler by making the semifinals of the 2013 conference tournament. In 2014, the Bulls made the AAC tournament championship game, which they lost on penalty kicks 3–2. The Bulls appeared in the NCAA tournament for the second time in program history but fell in the first round. USF went to the AAC Tournament Championship game again in 2015, but lost the championship game on penalty kicks for the second year in a row. Also for the second straight year, the Bulls had a first round exit in the 2015 NCAA tournament. In 2017, USF finished second in the conference during the regular season to arch rival Central Florida and the two would go on to meet in the AAC tournament championship game. There, the Bulls finally exorcised their championship game demons and won 5–3 on penalty kicks for their first ever conference tournament championship. This gave USF their first autobid to the NCAA tournament in program history. The Bulls won their first-round game in the tournament 3–0 against FGCU but were eliminated with a 1–0 loss to No. 3 Florida in the second round.

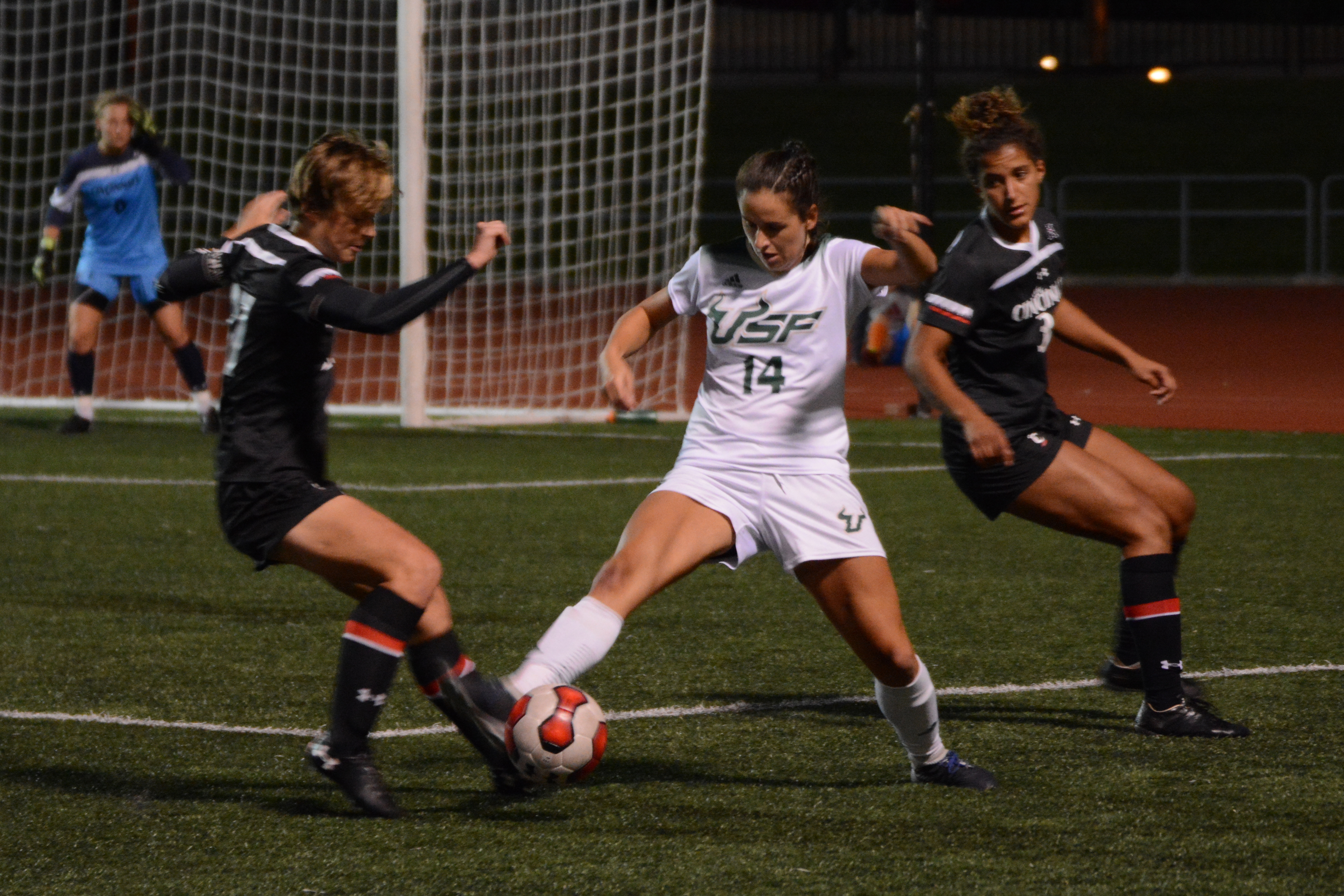
Bulls forward Évelyne Viens takes on two Cincinnati Bearcats defenders in 2019.

USF followed their conference tournament championship with a regular season conference title and appearance in the 2018 AAC tournament championship, but lost to Memphis 3–0. They returned to the NCAA tournament where they beat Albany 5–1 in the first round before losing 3–1 to eventual national champion Florida State. The Bulls and Memphis switched their conference results the next season, with USF coming in second to undefeated Memphis in the regular season then defeating the Tigers in the 2019 conference tournament. In the NCAA tournament, USF upset Florida 4–2 in the first round, then shut out No. 4 Washington 2–0 to win a team record 16 games for the season and reach the Round of 16 for the first time, where they were defeated 2–1 by No. 1 seed Florida State, being eliminated by the Seminoles for the second year in a row. Senior Évelyne Viens was named to the second team all-American list.

In the 2020 season, which was delayed until the spring of 2021 because of the COVID-19 pandemic, the Bulls finished with their first undefeated regular season in program history with a 7–0–2 record, winning the regular season conference title for the second time in three seasons. Dubbed by local media and fans as "The InvinciBulls" (a play on the nickname given to Arsenal F.C. when they won the Premier League unbeaten in 2003–04), the 2020 Bulls had five members of the team named to the first team all-conference list. They won the conference tournament for the third time in four years and won it on home turf for the first time in program history to clinch a spot in their seventh NCAA tournament. They were beaten in the second round by No. 7 Texas A&M.

In 2021, the Bulls won the regular season AAC crown again, making it five straight years of them winning either the regular season or tournament conference title. They lost to Memphis on penalty kicks in the conference tournament title game, but were still selected for the NCAA tournament. They fell in the first round of the tournament to NC State.

Schilte-Brown left the Bulls after the 2023 season (in which the Bulls won the AAC East Division) to become the coach of Tampa's newly founded USL Super League club Tampa Bay Sun FC. Her husband Chris, who served as USF's associate head coach and formerly coached VCU's women's soccer team took over as head coach beginning in 2024.

== Current squad ==
As of November 2026

Note: Flags indicate national team as defined under FIFA eligibility rules; some limited exceptions apply. Players may hold more than one non-FIFA nationality.

No.	Pos.	Nation	Player
1	MF	USA	Sophia Thomas
2	MF	USA	Kenza Brown
3	GK	USA	Gaby Rourke
4	FW	USA	McKenna Battilla
5	DF	USA	Maria Bulis
6	DF	USA	Ellie Pitts
7	DF	USA	Joelle Stinson
8	DF	USA	Elyse Thornton
9	FW	PAN	Anita Quintero
10	FW	USA	Ava Plezia
11	FW	USA	Nailani Solomon
12	MF	USA	Reese Rupe
13	FW	CAN	Sophia Cabral
14	DF	USA	Ava Rightmire

No.	Pos.	Nation	Player
15	FW	USA	Amelia Malkin
16	MF	CAN	Ainsley Ewasiuk
17	FW	USA	Delaney Tellex
18	DF	USA	Regan Kelly
20	MF	USA	Marilia Nieves-Melchor
22	MF	JPN	Yui Suetsugu
23	FW	HUN	Dora Szabo
24	DF	USA	Audrey Buck
25	DF	USA	Avril Clark
27	DF	USA	Jada Alexander
28	MF	CAN	Maya Hindson
30	MF	USA	Brooke Fabri
31	GK	CAN	Kylie Sandulak
99	GK	CRC	Marely Fonseca

== Season-by-season results ==
Year	Conference	Games played	Record (W–L–T)	Win percentage	Conference record (W–L–T)	Head coach	Postseason
1995	Independent	14	11–3–0	.786	N/A	T. Logan Fleck	
1996	Conference USA	18	6–11–1	.361	2–7–0	T. Logan Fleck	
1997	Conference USA	17	10–6–1	.618	4–4–1	T. Logan Fleck	
1998	Conference USA	19	15–1–3	.868	9–0–2 (Won conference regular season)	T. Logan Fleck	
1999	Conference USA	19	11–8–0	.579	7–4–0	T. Logan Fleck	
2000	Conference USA	17	6–10–1	.382	4–6–1	T. Logan Fleck	
2001	Conference USA	19	4–13–2	.263	1–8–1	T. Logan Fleck	
2002	Conference USA	18	8–8–2	.500	4–4–2	T. Logan Fleck	
2003	Conference USA	18	8–8–2	.500	6–3–1	T. Logan Fleck	
2004	Conference USA	16	5–9–2	.375	4–6–0	T. Logan Fleck	
2005	Big East	17	7–7–3	.500	2–6–3	T. Logan Fleck	
2006	Big East	17	6–10–1	.382	3–8–0	T. Logan Fleck	
2007	Big East	17	4–10–3	.324	3–6–2	Denise Schilte-Brown	
2008	Big East	18	7–8–3	.472	3–7–1	Denise Schilte-Brown	
2009	Big East	20	9–8–3	.525	6–4–2	Denise Schilte-Brown	
2010	Big East	23	14–6–3	.674	6–3–2	Denise Schilte-Brown	NCAA Round of 32
2011	Big East	18	6–8–4	.444	2–6–3	Denise Schilte-Brown	
2012	Big East	19	10–5–4	.632	6–2–2	Denise Schilte-Brown	
2013	American Conference	20	10–4–6	.650	4–3–2	Denise Schilte-Brown	
2014	American Conference	22	13–7–2	.636	6–3–0 (Won conference regular season)	Denise Schilte-Brown	NCAA first round
2015	American Conference	22	15–4–3	.750	6–2–1	Denise Schilte-Brown	NCAA first round
2016	American Conference	19	12–4–3	.711	4–3–2	Denise Schilte-Brown	
2017	American Conference	19	13–4–2	.737	**7–1–1** **(Won conference tournament)**	Denise Schilte-Brown	NCAA round of 32
2018	American Conference	18	15–3–0	.833	8–1–0 (Won conference regular season)	Denise Schilte-Brown	NCAA round of 32
2019	American Conference	21	16–5–0	.762	**7–2–0 (Won conference tournament)**	Denise Schilte-Brown	NCAA round of 16
2020	American Conference	13	10–1–2	.946	**6–0–1 (Won conference regular season and tournament)**	Denise Schilte-Brown	NCAA round of 32
2021	American Conference	19	12–4–3	.711	6–1–1 (Won conference regular season)	Denise Schilte-Brown	NCAA first round
2022	American Conference	17	8–9–0	.471	5–3–0	Denise Schilte-Brown	
2023	American Conference	18	10–6–2	.611	6–1–2	Denise Schilte-Brown	
Total		532	281–190–61	.586	198–85–46		23 Appearances (12–20–6 record)
Bold indicates tournament won Italics indicate conference championship

== Awards and recognition ==
=== Players ===
==== Olympians ====
Four USF women's soccer players have competed in the Olympics. Évelyne Viens became the first USF alum in any sport to win an Olympic medal when Canada won gold in 2020.

- (New Zealand) Olivia Chance – 2020
- (Chile) Christiane Endler – 2020
- (United Kingdom) Demi Stokes – 2020
- (Canada) Évelyne Viens – 2020

==== All Americans ====
- Évelyne Viens (Third team, 2017)
- Évelyne Viens (Third team, 2018)
- Évelyne Viens (Second team, 2019)
- Sydney Martinez (Second team, 2020)
- Sydny Nasello (First team, 2020)

==== First team all-conference ====
- Kristine Edner, 1996
- Kristine Edner, 1997
- Janeen Sobush, 1998
- Tia Opliger, 1998
- Kristine Edner, 1998
- Siri Nordby, 1999
- Siri Nordby, 2000
- Tia Opliger, 2002
- Katie Reed, 2003
- Breck Bankester, 2004
- Tia Opliger, 2004
- Lindsey Brauer, 2006
- Chelsea Klotz, 2010
- Taylor Patterson, 2012
- Jackie Simpson, 2013
- Sharla Passariello, 2013
- Demi Stokes, 2014
- Leticia Skeete, 2014
- Jackie Simpson, 2014
- Olivia Chance, 2015
- Grace Adams, 2016
- Kelli Burney, 2017
- Évelyne Viens, 2017
- Kat Elliot, 2017
- Kelli Burney, 2018
- Évelyne Viens, 2018
- Évelyne Viens, 2019
- Andrea Hauksdottir, 2019
- Sydney Martinez, 2019
- Sydny Nasello, 2019
- Sydny Nasello, 2020
- Chyanne Dennis, 2020
- Vivianne Bessette, 2020
- Sydney Martinez, 2020
- Chiara Hahn, 2020
- Sydny Nasello, 2021
- Chyanne Dennis, 2021
- Vivianne Bessette, 2021
- Leire Herraez Gallach, 2024
- Sadie Sider-Echenberg, 2024
- Georgia Brown, 2024

==== Conference player of the year ====
===== Goalkeeper =====
- Sydney Martinez, 2020
- Leire Herraez Gallach, 2024

===== Defensive =====
- Jackie Simpson, 2015
- Chyanne Dennis, 2020

===== Midfielder =====
- Andrea Hauksdottir, 2018
- Andrea Hauksdottir, 2019
- Sadie Sider-Echenberg, 2024

===== Offensive =====
- Évelyne Viens, 2018
- Évelyne Viens, 2019
- Sydny Nasello, 2020
- Sydny Nasello, 2021

=== Coaches ===
==== Conference coach of the year ====
- T. Logan Fleck (1998)
- Denise Schlite-Brown (2018)
- Denise Schlite-Brown (2020)

== Media ==
Under the current American Conference TV deal, all home and in-conference away women's soccer games are shown on one of the various ESPN networks or streamed live on ESPN+. Live radio broadcasts of games are also available worldwide for free on the Bulls Unlimited digital radio station on TuneIn.

== See also ==
- South Florida Bulls men's soccer
- South Florida Bulls
