= Mid-American Conference women's soccer tournament =

- Conference soccer championship
- Sport: College soccer
- Conference: Mid-American Conference
- Number of teams: 6
- Format: Single-elimination tournament
- Current stadium: Historic Crew Stadium
- Current location: Columbus, Ohio
- Played: 1997–present
- Last contest: 2025
- Current champion: Western Michigan (6th title)
- Most championships: Bowling Green; Western Michigan (6 titles)
- TV partner: ESPN+
- Official website: getsomemaction.com/wsoc

The Mid-American Conference women's soccer tournament is the conference championship tournament in women's soccer for the Mid-American Conference (MAC). The tournament has been held every year in November since 1997. It is a single-elimination tournament that features the conference's top six teams, with seeding based on regular season records. The winner receives the conference's automatic bid to the NCAA Division I women's soccer championship. Through the 2024 season, the Bowling Green Falcons and Western Michigan Broncos have won the most championships with six, followed by the Toledo Rockets with five titles.

== Format ==
The tournament begins in late October or early November. The top six teams from the regular season qualify for the tournament and are seeded based on the order of finish in the conference play. Qualifying teams are then placed in a single-elimination bracket, with the top seed playing the lowest seed, until meeting in a final championship game. Through the 2024 tournament, the opening rounds were played at campus sites and with the semifinals and final played at the highest remaining seed's home field. Beginning in 2025 and at least through 2026, the entire tournament will be played at Historic Crew Stadium in Columbus, Ohio.

Prior to 2020 the tournament consisted of eight teams, and for the 2020 season was the top team of the East Division versus the top team in the West Division.

== Champions ==
=== Key ===
Key

- (1) — Title number
- a.e.t. — Match went to extra time
- p – Match decided by a penalty shootout after extra time
- – Winning team also won regular season

=== By year ===
Ed.	Year	Champion	Score	Runner-up	Venue / city	Ref.
1	1997	Northern Illinois (1)	3–2 (a.e.t.)	Eastern Michigan	NIU Soccer Complex • DeKalb, IL	
2	1998	Northern Illinois (2)	2–1 (a.e.t.)	Ohio	Chessa Field • Athens, OH	
3	1999	Eastern Michigan (1)	0–0 (5–3 p)	Miami (OH)	Scicluna Field • Ypsilanti, MI	
4	2000	Miami (OH) (1)	1–0 (a.e.t.)	Bowling Green	UB Stadium • Buffalo, NY	
5	2001	Miami (OH) (2)	3–1	Central Michigan	Chessa Field • Athens, OH	
6	2002	Miami (OH) (3)	5–3	Ohio	Bobby Kramig Field • Oxford, OH	
7	2003	Western Michigan (1)	4–1	Bowling Green	WMU Complex • Kalamazoo, MI	
8	2004	Bowling Green (1)	2–0	Central Michigan	Chessa Field • Athens, OH	
9	2005	Bowling Green (2)	0–0 (3–2 p)	Kent State	Cochrane Stadium • Bowling Green, OH	
10	2006	Toledo (1)	2–1	Northern Illinois	Paul Hotmer Field • Toledo, OH	
11	2007	Toledo (2)	2–2 (3–2 p)	Bowling Green	Briner Sports Complex • Muncie, IN	
12	2008	Toledo (3)	1–0	Eastern Michigan	Paul Hotmer Field • Toledo, OH	
13	2009	Central Michigan (1)	1–0	Miami (OH)	CMU Complex • Mount Pleasant, MI	
14	2010	Central Michigan (2)	3–1	Western Michigan	Paul Hotmer Field • Toledo, OH	
15	2011	Toledo (4)	1–0	Western Michigan	Paul Hotmer Field • Toledo, OH	
16	2012	Miami (OH) (4)	2–1	Central Michigan	Bobby Kramig Field • Oxford, OH	
17	2013	Western Michigan (2)	1–0	Ball State	Scicluna Field • Ypsilanti, MI	
18	2014	Buffalo (1)	1–0	Western Michigan	UB Stadium • Buffalo, NY	
19	2015	Western Michigan (3)	2–0	Miami (OH)	WMU Complex • Kalamazoo, MI	
20	2016	Kent State (1)	1–0	Northern Illinois	Dix Stadium • Kent, OH	
21	2017	Toledo (5)	2–1 (a.e.t.)	Bowling Green	Dix Stadium • Kent, OH	
22	2018	Bowling Green (3)	1–1 (5–4 p)	Ball State	Cochrane Stadium • Bowling Green, OH	
23	2019	Bowling Green (4)	0–0 (3–1 p)	Eastern Michigan	Cochrane Stadium • Bowling Green, OH	
24	2020	Bowling Green (5)	2–0	Ball State	Cochrane Stadium • Bowling Green, OH	
25	2021	Bowling Green (6)	3–0	Kent State	Cochrane Stadium • Bowling Green, OH	
26	2022	Buffalo (2)	2–0	Ball State	UB Stadium • Buffalo, NY	
27	2023	Ohio (1)	2–1	Kent State	WMU Complex • Kalamazoo, MI	
28	2024	Western Michigan (4)	5–0	Buffalo	WMU Complex • Kalamazoo, MI	
29	2025	Western Michigan (5)	1–0	Bowling Green	Historic Crew Stadium • Columbus, OH	
30	2026	Western Michigan (6)	2–0	UMass	Historic Crew Stadium • Columbus, OH	

=== By school ===
As of 2026 Tournament

School	App.	W	L	T	Pct.	Finals	Titles	Winning years
Akron	6	0	6	1	.071	0	0	—
Ball State	20	8	14	10	.406	4	0	—
Bowling Green	19	23	10	11	.648	11	6	2004, 2005, 2018, 2019, 2020, 2021
Buffalo	18	12	15	1	.446	3	2	2014, 2022
Central Michigan	20	17	15	2	.529	5	2	2009, 2010
Eastern Michigan	19	9	15	5	.385	4	1	1999
Kent State	22	13	18	5	.431	4	1	2016
Marshall	1	0	1	0	.000	0	0	—
Miami (OH)	21	22	14	5	.598	7	4	2000, 2001, 2002, 2012
Northern Illinois	13	9	11	2	.455	4	2	1997, 1998
Ohio	22	14	21	1	.403	3	1	2023
Toledo	14	15	7	5	.648	5	5	2006, 2007, 2008, 2011, 2017
UMass	1	1	1	0	.500	1	0	—
Western Michigan	26	22	20	3	.522	9	6	2003, 2013, 2015, 2024, 2025, 2026

Teams in italics no longer sponsor women's soccer in the MAC.
