= 2019 Mid-American Conference women's soccer tournament =

- Classification: Division I
- Teams: 8
- Matches: 7
- Attendance: 2,392
- Site: Mickey Cochrane Stadium (Semifinals and Final); Bowling Green, Ohio
- Champions: Bowling Green (4th title)
- Winning coach: Matt Fannon (2nd title)
- MVP: Nikhita Jacob (Bowling Green)
- Broadcast: None

2019 Mid-American Conference women's soccer standings
	Conf.						Overall
Team	W		L		T	PCT	W		L		T	PCT
Bowling Green ‍†‍‡‍^{y}	10	–	1	–	0	.909	14	–	6	–	3	.674
Ball State ‍‍‍	8	–	2	–	0	.800	14	–	4	–	0	.778
Western Michigan ‍‍‍	6	–	4	–	1	.591	8	–	9	–	1	.472
Buffalo ‍‍‍	5	–	4	–	2	.545	5	–	4	–	2	.545
Akron ‍‍‍	5	–	4	–	2	.545	8	–	9	–	2	.474
Ohio ‍‍‍	5	–	5	–	1	.500	10	–	8	–	1	.553
Eastern Michigan ‍‍‍	5	–	6	–	0	.455	6	–	11	–	2	.368
Central Michigan ‍‍‍	4	–	5	–	2	.455	7	–	5	–	4	.563
Kent State ‍‍‍	4	–	5	–	2	.455	6	–	9	–	3	.417
Toledo ‍‍‍	4	–	7	–	0	.364	7	–	12	–	0	.368
Miami (OH) ‍‍‍	3	–	6	–	1	.350	4	–	12	–	1	.265
Northern Illinois ‍‍‍	0	–	10	–	1	.045	2	–	14	–	2	.167
† – Conference champion ‡ – 2019 MAC Tournament champion y – Invited to the NCAA Tournament; As of December 9, 2019; Rankings from United Soccer Coaches Poll; Source:Mid-American Conference

The 2019 Mid-American Conference women's soccer tournament was the postseason women's soccer tournament for the Mid-American Conference held from November 3 through November 10, 2019. The quarterfinals were held at campus sites. The semifinals and finals took place at Mickey Cochrane Stadium in Bowling Green, Ohio, home of the Bowling Green Falcons, the highest remaining seed in the tournament following the quarterfinal matches. The eight-team single-elimination tournament consisted of three rounds based on seeding from regular season conference play. The Bowling Green Falcons were the defending champions, and they successfully defended their title with a 3–1 penalty shootout win over the Eastern Michigan in the final. The title was the fourth for the Bowling Green women's soccer program and the second for head coach Matt Fannon.

== Bracket ==
Quarterfinals; Sunday, Nov. 3
1	Bowling Green	4
8	Central Michigan	1
4	Buffalo	2^{2OT}
5	Akron	1
2	Ball State	1
7	Eastern Michigan	2
3	Western Michigan	0
6	Ohio	2

Semifinals; Friday, Nov. 8
1	Bowling Green	2
4	Buffalo	1
7	Eastern Michigan	5
6	Ohio	2

Final; Sunday, Nov. 10
1	Bowling Green	0 (3)
7	Eastern Michigan	0 (1)

== Schedule ==
=== Quarterfinals ===
November 3, 2019	#1 Bowling Green	4–1	#8 Central Michigan	Bowling Green, Ohio
1:00 p.m. EST	Sarah Allen 48'; Nikki Cox 51'; Makenzie Ortman 70'; Kennedy White 77'	Report	82' Katie Coleman	Stadium: Mickey Cochrane Stadium; Attendance: 426; Referee: Michael Allie; Assistant referees: Justin Tatsak; Christian Little; Fourth official: Jacob Little

November 3, 2019	#2 Ball State	1–2	#7 Eastern Michigan	Muncie, Indiana
1:00 p.m. EST	Peighton Cook 59'; Lexy Smith (yellow card) 87'	Report	13' Sabrina McNeill; 88' (pen.) Amanda Cripps	Stadium: Briner Sports Complex; Referee: Ceasar Ibarra; Assistant referees: Fernando Ibarra; Edmundo Ramirez; Fourth official: Richard Geati

November 3, 2019	#3 Western Michigan	0–2	#6 Ohio	Kalamazoo, Michigan
1:00 p.m. EST		Report	51' Sydney Leckie; 59' Alivia Milesky	Stadium: WMU Soccer Complex; Attendance: 207; Referee: Brandon Knauss; Assistant referees: Kevin Ficar; Ryan Ash; Fourth official: Arlin Kociu

November 3, 2019	#4 Buffalo	2–1 (a.e.t.)	#5 Akron	Buffalo, New York
1:00 p.m. EST	Kaitlyn Walsh 83'; Taylor Caridi 108'	Report	73' Abigail Brown	Stadium: UB Stadium; Referee: Brian Miller; Assistant referees: Ryan Slack; Tim Dicken; Fourth official: John Safar

=== Semifinals ===
November 8, 2019	#1 Bowling Green	2–1	#4 Buffalo	Bowling Green, Ohio
4:00 p.m. EST	Chelsee Washington 17'; Katie Cox 24'; Lynsey Spotts (yellow card) 41'	Report	(yellow card) 44' Carley Zoccali; 79' Marcy Barberic	Stadium: Mickey Cochrane Stadium; Attendance: 438; Referee: Christopher Koloffon; Assistant referees: Landon Albert; Jose Ortiz; Fourth official: Ted Grigoriou

November 8, 2019	#6 Ohio	2–5	#7 Eastern Michigan	Bowling Green, Ohio
7:00 p.m. EST	Alivia Milesky 18', 64'; Victoria Breeden (yellow card) 76'	Report	12' Amanda Cripps; 36', 40', 46', 54' Kristin Hullibarger	Stadium: Mickey Cochrane Stadium; Attendance: 438; Referee: Heber Estrada; Assistant referees: Carlos Leyva; Anthony Vasoli; Fourth official: Ted Grigoriou

=== Final ===
November 10, 2019	#1 Bowling Green	0–0 (a.e.t.) (3–1 p)	#7 Eastern Michigan	Bowling Green, Ohio
1:00 p.m. EST		Report	(yellow card) 55' Alia Frederick	Stadium: Mickey Cochrane Stadium; Attendance: 1,321; Referee: Michael Kennedy; Assistant referees: Landon Albert; Khalaf Al-Latayfeh; Fourth official: Ted Grigoriou
	Penalties
	Chelsee Washington (penalty scored); Kennedy White (penalty scored); Katie Cox (penalty missed); Nikki Cox (penalty missed); Nikhita Jacob (penalty scored)		(penalty missed) Peyton Davis; (penalty scored) Nicole Remedios; (penalty missed) Parys Kerr; (penalty missed) Amanda Cripps

== Statistics ==
=== Goalscorers ===
4 Goals

- Kristin Hullibarger (Eastern Michigan)

3 Goals

- Alivia Milesky (Ohio)

2 Goals

- Amanda Cripps (Eastern Michigan)

1 Goal

- Sarah Allen (Bowling Green)
- Marcy Barberic (Buffalo)
- Abigail Brown (Akron)
- Taylor Caridi (Buffalo)
- Katie Coleman (Central Michigan)
- Peighton Cook (Ball State)
- Katie Cox (Bowling Green)
- Nikki Cox (Bowling Green)
- Sydney Leckie (Ohio)
- Sabrina McNeill (Eastern Michigan)
- Mackenzie Ortman (Bowling Green)
- Kaitlyn Walsh (Buffalo)
- Chelsee Washington (Bowling Green)
- Kennedy White (Bowling Green)

== All-Tournament team ==
Player	Team
Katie Cox	Bowling Green
Mackenzie Reuber	Bowling Green
Lena Kovar	Bowling Green
**Nikhita Jacob**	Bowling Green
Chelsea Abbotts	Eastern Michigan
Sabrina McNeill	Eastern Michigan
Kristin Hulibarger	Eastern Michigan
Emily Kelly	Buffalo
Adrianna VanCuyck	Buffalo
Alivia Milesky	Ohio
Sydney Leckie	Ohio

MVP in bold
