= 2021 Mid-American Conference women's soccer tournament =

Postseason women's soccer tournament

- Classification: Division I
- Teams: 6
- Matches: 5
- Attendance: 2,318
- Site: Mickey Cochrane Stadium (Semifinals and Final); Bowling Green, Ohio
- Champions: Bowling Green (6th title)
- Winning coach: Matt Fannon (4th title)
- MVP: Lacee Bethea (Bowling Green)
- Broadcast: None

2021 Mid-American Conference women's soccer standings
	Conf.						Overall
Team	W		L		T	PCT	W		L		T	PCT
Bowling Green ‍†‍‡‍^{y}	8	–	2	–	1	.773	11	–	6	–	3	.625
Kent State ‍‍‍	7	–	1	–	3	.773	13	–	5	–	3	.690
Ohio ‍‍‍	7	–	1	–	3	.773	11	–	5	–	3	.658
Buffalo ‍‍‍	6	–	2	–	3	.682	13	–	4	–	3	.725
Central Michigan ‍‍‍	6	–	4	–	1	.591	9	–	8	–	1	.528
Toledo ‍‍‍	5	–	4	–	2	.545	10	–	6	–	4	.600
Miami (OH) ‍‍‍	5	–	6	–	0	.455	8	–	8	–	3	.500
Ball State ‍‍‍	4	–	5	–	2	.455	6	–	9	–	2	.412
Western Michigan ‍‍‍	4	–	7	–	0	.364	6	–	12	–	0	.333
Northern Illinois ‍‍‍	2	–	7	–	2	.273	5	–	12	–	2	.316
Eastern Michigan ‍‍‍	1	–	8	–	2	.182	2	–	13	–	3	.194
Akron ‍‍‍	1	–	9	–	1	.136	3	–	15	–	1	.184
† – Conference champion ‡ – 2021 MAC Tournament champion y – Invited to the NCAA tournament As of December 7, 2021; Rankings from United Soccer Coaches Poll; Source:Mid-American Conference

The 2021 Mid-American Conference women's soccer tournament was the postseason women's soccer tournament for the Mid-American Conference held from October 31 through November 7, 2021. The First Round was held at campus sites. The semifinals and finals took place at Mickey Cochrane Stadium in Bowling Green, Ohio, home of the Bowling Green Falcons, the regular season conference champions. The six-team single-elimination tournament consisted of three rounds based on seeding from regular season conference play. The Bowling Green Falcons were the defending champions, and they successfully defended their title with a 3–0 win over Kent State in the final. The title was the sixth for the Bowling Green women's soccer program and the fourth for head coach Matt Fannon. As tournament champions, Bowling Green earned the Mid-American's automatic berth into the 2021 NCAA Division I Women's Soccer Tournament.

== Seeding ==
Six Mid-American Conference schools participated in the tournament. Teams were seeded by conference record. A tiebreaker was required to determine the second and third seeds in the tournament as Ohio and Kent State finished tied in the rankings with an identical 7–1–3 record. The regular season match-up between the teams finished in a 0–0 tie on October 28, the final day of the regular season. As a second tiebreaker, conference goal differential was used. Ohio had the better goal differential and was awarded the second seed and first round bye.

Seed	School	Conference Record	Points
1	Bowling Green	8–2–1	25
2	Ohio	7–1–3	24
3	Kent State	7–1–3	24
4	Buffalo	6–2–3	21
5	Central Michigan	6–4–1	19
6	Toledo	5–4–2	17

== Bracket ==
Quarterfinals; Monday, Oct. 31
4	Buffalo (a.e.t.)	2
5	Central Michigan	1
3	Kent State	4
6	Toledo	2

Semifinals; Thursday, Nov. 4
1	Bowling Green	1
4	Buffalo	0
2	Ohio	2
3	Kent State	3

Final; Saturday, Nov. 5
1	Bowling Green	3
3	Kent State	0

== Schedule ==
=== First Round ===
October 31, 2021	#4 Buffalo	2–1 (a.e.t.)	#5 Central Michigan	Buffalo, NY
1:00 p.m. EST	Marcy Barberic 9' (pen.); Andrea Judasz (yellow card) 72'; Payton Robertson 105'	Report	16' (pen.) Samantha Kaye-Toral	Stadium: UB Stadium; Attendance: 171

October 31, 2021	#3 Kent State	4–2	#6 Toledo	Kent, OH
1:00 p.m. EST	Siena Stambolich 20'; Giulia Giovinazzi 79'; Karly Hellstrom 83' (pen.); Cameron Shedenhelm (yellow card) 88', (goal) 89'	Report	16' Ellie Pool; (yellow card) 60' Claire Cahalan; 75' Betsy Lueck; (yellow card) 82' Sissy Novak	Stadium: Dix Stadium; Attendance: 215; Referee: Quinton McFarlen; Assistant referees: Aaron Mitchell; Brandon Klepach; Fourth official: John Safar

=== Semifinals ===
November 4, 2021	#1 Bowling Green	1–0	#4 Buffalo	Bowling Green, Ohio
4:00 p.m. EST	Lacee Bethea 27'; Mackenzie Reuber (yellow card) 61'	Report		Stadium: Mickey Cochrane Stadium; Attendance: 487; Referee: Kevin Fikar; Assistant referees: Noah Matos; Michael Nickerson; Fourth official: Ted Grigoriou

November 4, 2021	#2 Ohio	2–3	#3 Kent State	Bowling Green, Ohio
7:00 p.m. EST	Madison Clayton 3'; Paige Knorr (yellow card) 64'; Regan Berg 68'; Team (red card) 90'	Report	(yellow card) 30' Khyla Porter; 44' Cameron Shedenhelm; 54', 86' (pen.) Karly Hellstrom; (yellow card) 56' Keyosha Donkor; (red card) 73' Sarah Melen	Stadium: Mickey Cochrane Stadium; Attendance: 692; Referee: Nikola Aleksic; Assistant referees: Noah Hartman; Sean West; Fourth official: Ted Grigoriou

=== Final ===
November 7, 2021	#1 Bowling Green	3–0	#3 Kent State	Bowling Green, Ohio
1:00 p.m. EST	Nikki Cox 7'; Audrey Shea 70'; Lacee Bethea 76'; Mackenzie Reuber (yellow card) 85'	Report	(yellow card) 48' Karly Hellstrom; (yellow card) 81' Luca Ralph	Stadium: Mickey Cochrane Stadium; Attendance: 753; Referee: Dimitri Katsimingos; Assistant referees: Adam Herges; Courtney Hayworth; Fourth official: Ted Grigoriou

== Statistics ==
=== Goalscorers ===
There were 18 goals scored in 5 matches, for an average of 3.6 goals per match (as of November 7, 2021).

3 goals

- Karly Hellstrom – Kent State

2 goals

- Lacee Bethea – Bowling Green
- Cameron Shedenhelm – Kent State

1 goal

- Nikki Cox – Bowling Green
- Audrey Shea – Bowling Green
- Marcy Barberic – Buffalo
- Payton Robertson – Buffalo
- Samantha Kaye-Toral – Central Michigan
- Giulia Giovinazzi – Kent State
- Siena Stamboich – Kent State
- Regan Berg – Ohio
- Madison Clayton – Ohio
- Betsy Lueck – Toledo
- Ellie Pool – Toledo

== All-Tournament team ==
Player	Team
Nikki Cox	Bowling Green
**Lacee Bethea**	Bowling Green
Audrey Shea	Bowling Green
Madi Wolfbauer	Bowling Green
Cameron Shendenhelm	Kent State
Karly Hellstrom	Kent State
Giulia Giovinazzi	Kent State
Madison Clayton	Ohio
Regan Berg	Ohio
Payton Robertson	Buffalo
Kaya Schultz	Buffalo

MVP in bold
