= 2024 Mid-American Conference women's soccer tournament =

Postseason women's soccer tournament

- Classification: Division I
- Teams: 6
- Matches: 5
- Attendance: 1,887
- Site: WMU Soccer Complex (Semifinals and Final); Kalamazoo, Michigan
- Champions: Western Michigan (4th title)
- Winning coach: Lewis Robinson (1st title)
- MVP: Abby Werthman (Western Michigan)
- Broadcast: ESPN+

2024 Mid-American Conference women's soccer standings
	Conf.						Overall
Team	W		L		T	PCT	W		L		T	PCT
Western Michigan ‍†‍‡‍^{y}	8	–	0	–	3	.864	13	–	2	–	6	.762
Buffalo ‍‍‍	5	–	1	–	5	.682	11	–	2	–	7	.725
Ohio ‍‍‍	5	–	3	–	3	.591	11	–	5	–	4	.650
Kent State ‍‍‍	5	–	4	–	2	.545	9	–	7	–	3	.553
Miami (OH) ‍‍‍	4	–	3	–	4	.545	8	–	5	–	6	.579
Bowling Green ‍‍‍	4	–	4	–	3	.500	7	–	7	–	4	.500
Eastern Michigan ‍‍‍	3	–	3	–	5	.500	7	–	6	–	5	.528
Northern Illinois ‍‍‍	3	–	4	–	4	.455	9	–	5	–	5	.605
Central Michigan ‍‍‍	3	–	4	–	4	.455	5	–	8	–	5	.417
Toledo ‍‍‍	3	–	4	–	4	.455	6	–	7	–	5	.472
Ball State ‍‍‍	2	–	6	–	3	.318	7	–	8	–	3	.472
Akron ‍‍‍	0	–	9	–	2	.091	5	–	9	–	4	.389
† – Conference champion ‡ – 2024 MAC Tournament champion y – Invited to the NCAA Tournament; As of December 10, 2024; Rankings from United Soccer Coaches Poll; Source:Mid-American Conference

The 2024 Mid-American Conference women's soccer tournament was the postseason women's soccer tournament for the Mid-American Conference held from November 3 through November 10, 2024. The First Round was held at campus sites. The semifinals and finals took place at WMU Soccer Complex in Kalamazoo, Michigan, home of Western Michigan, the regular season conference champions. The six-team single-elimination tournament consisted of three rounds based on seeding from regular season conference play. The Ohio Bobcats were the defending champions, as they fell in the semifinals to Buffalo. Western Michigan defeated Ohio in the final, 5–0. The title was the fourth in program history for the Western Michigan women's soccer program and first for head coach John Deal. As tournament champions, Western Michigan earned the Mid-American's automatic berth into the 2024 NCAA Division I women's soccer tournament.

== Seeding ==
The top six Mid-American Conference teams from the regular season earned berths in the tournament. Teams were seeded by conference record. No tiebreakers were required as all of the top seven teams finished with unique regular season records.

Seed	School	Conference Record	Points
1	Western Michigan	8–0–3	27
2	Buffalo	5–1–5	20
3	Ohio	5–3–3	18
4	Kent State	5–4–2	17
5	Miami (OH)	4–3–4	16
6	Bowling Green	4–4–3	15

== Bracket ==
Quarterfinals; Sunday, Nov. 3
4	Kent State (a.e.t.)	2
5	Miami (OH)	1
3	Ohio	1
6	Bowling Green	0

Semifinals; Thursday, Nov. 7
1	Western Michigan	4
4	Kent State	1
2	Buffalo	1
3	Ohio	1

Final; Sunday, Nov. 10
1	Western Michigan	5
2	Buffalo	0

== Schedule ==
=== First Round ===
November 3, 2024	#3 Ohio	1–0	#6 Bowling Green	Athens, OH
1:00 p.m. EST	Ella Deevers 15'; Eve Berish (yellow card) 66'	Report	(yellow card) 90' Isabelle Gilmore	Stadium: Chessa Field; Attendance: 487; Referee: Kevin Fikar; Assistant referees: Jake Brochu; Dylan Beck; Fourth official: Alex Ryan

November 3, 2024	#4 Kent State	2–1 (a.e.t.)	#5 Miami (OH)	Kent, OH
1:00 p.m. EST	Alisa Arthur 3'; Siena Stambolich 100'	Report	45' Makenna Morrison; (yellow card) 57' Sydney Thompson; (yellow card) 58' Team; (yellow card) 58' Team	Stadium: Dix Stadium; Attendance: 316; Referee: Sorin Stoica; Assistant referees: Roy Miller; Salvatore Saia; Fourth official: Robert Johnson

=== Semifinals ===
November 2, 2024	#2 Buffalo	2–1	#3 Ohio	Kalamazoo, MI
11:00 a.m. EST	Jasmine Guerber 13'; Kelly Severini 82'	Report	35' (pen.) Lillian Weller; (yellow card) 61' Jaimason Brooker; (yellow card) 62' Norah Roush	Stadium: WMU Soccer Complex; Attendance: 100; Referee: Christopher Koloffon; Assistant referees: Jacob Little; Christian Little; Fourth official: Jordan Howard

November 7, 2024	#1 Western Michigan	4–1	#4 Kent State	Kalamazoo, MI
2:30 p.m. EST	Jenna Blackburn 13'; Jen Blitchok 38' (pen.); Jaden Peck 40'; Brielle Gomez (yellow card) 42'; Ava Beckett (yellow card) 51'; Abby Werthman 64' (pen.)	Report	(yellow card) 7' Allison Collins; 20' (pen.) Alisa Arthur; (yellow card) 64' Team	Stadium: WMU Soccer Complex; Attendance: 334; Referee: Alex Beehler; Assistant referees: Besnik Rexhepi; Adam Herges; Fourth official: Justin Bell

=== Final ===
November 10, 2024	#1 Western Michigan	5–0	#2 Buffalo	Kalamazoo, MI
2:00 p.m. EST	Abby Werthman 38', 57', 82'; Jaden Peck 55'; Jen Blitchok 87'	Report	(yellow card) 87' Frederique St.-Jean	Stadium: WMU Soccer Complex; Attendance: 650; Referee: Nicole Green; Assistant referees: Rachel Smith; Erin Patterson; Fourth official: Grace Barrett

== Statistics ==
=== Goalscorers ===
There were 17 goals scored in 5 matches, for an average of 3.4 goals per match (as of November 10, 2024).

4 goals

- Abby Werthman – Western Michigan

2 goals

- Alisa Arthur – Kent State
- Jen Blitchok – Western Michigan
- Jaden Peck – Western Michigan

1 goal

- Jenna Blackburn – Western Michigan
- Ella Deevers – Ohio
- Jasmine Guerber – Buffalo
- Makenna Morrison – Miami (OH)
- Kelly Severini – Buffalo
- Siena Stambolich – Kent State
- Lillian Weller – Ohio

== All-Tournament team ==
Player	Team
Kaylin Ricci	Buffalo
Kaya Schultz	Buffalo
Frederique St.-Jean	Buffalo
Alisa Arthur	Kent State
Siena Stambolich	Kent State
Norah Roush	Ohio
Lillian Weller	Ohio
Jen Blitchok	Western Michigan
Brielle Gomez	Western Michigan
Jaden Peck	Western Michigan
**Abby Werthman**	Western Michigan

MVP in bold
