= 2022 Mid-American Conference women's soccer tournament =

Postseason women's soccer tournament

- Classification: Division I
- Teams: 6
- Matches: 5
- Attendance: 2,328
- Site: UB Stadium (Semifinals and Final); Buffalo, New York
- Champions: Buffalo (2nd title)
- Winning coach: Shawn Burke (2nd title)
- MVP: Hannah Callaghan (Buffalo)
- Broadcast: ESPN+

2022 Mid-American Conference women's soccer standings
	Conf.						Overall
Team	W		L		T	PCT	W		L		T	PCT
Buffalo ‍†‍‡‍^{y}	7	–	0	–	4	.818	15	–	2	–	4	.810
Ball State ‍‍‍	6	–	1	–	4	.727	7	–	5	–	8	.550
Bowling Green ‍‍‍	6	–	2	–	3	.682	9	–	5	–	5	.605
Ohio ‍‍‍	6	–	4	–	1	.591	10	–	7	–	2	.579
Miami (OH) ‍‍‍	4	–	2	–	5	.591	9	–	5	–	6	.600
Kent State ‍‍‍	4	–	2	–	5	.591	4	–	7	–	7	.417
Western Michigan ‍‍‍	5	–	4	–	2	.545	5	–	9	–	5	.395
Northern Illinois ‍‍‍	3	–	6	–	2	.364	6	–	7	–	4	.471
Akron ‍‍‍	2	–	7	–	2	.273	3	–	9	–	4	.313
Eastern Michigan ‍‍‍	2	–	7	–	2	.273	3	–	11	–	4	.278
Toledo ‍‍‍	1	–	6	–	4	.273	2	–	10	–	6	.278
Central Michigan ‍‍‍	1	–	6	–	4	.273	2	–	11	–	5	.250
† – Conference champion ‡ – 2022 MAC Tournament champion y – Invited to the NCAA Tournament; As of December 6, 2022; Rankings from United Soccer Coaches Poll; Source:Mid-American Conference

The 2022 Mid-American Conference women's soccer tournament was the postseason women's soccer tournament for the Mid-American Conference held from October 30 through November 6, 2022. The First Round was held at campus sites. The semifinals and finals took place at UB Stadium in Buffalo, New York, home of the Buffalo Bulls, the regular season conference champions. The six-team single-elimination tournament consisted of three rounds based on seeding from regular season conference play. The Bowling Green Falcons were the defending champions, and they were unsuccessful in defending their title as they lost to Ball State on penalties in the Semifinals. Ball State would go on to lose to Buffalo in the Final 2–0. The title was the second for the Buffalo women's soccer program both of which have come under head coach Shawn Burke. As tournament champions, Buffalo earned the Mid-American's automatic berth into the 2022 NCAA Division I women's soccer tournament.

== Seeding ==
Six Mid-American Conference schools participated in the tournament. Teams were seeded by conference record. A tiebreaker was required to determine the fifth and sixth seeds and which team would not qualify for the tournament as Miami (OH), Western Michigan, and Kent State all finished with seventeen points in regular season conference play. During the regular season Miami (OH) defeated Western Michigan and tied with Kent State. Western Michigan defeated Kent State and lost to Miami (OH). Kent State tied with Miami (OH) and lost to Western Michigan. Therefore, using the same point system that was used for the regular season standings, Miami (OH) had four points and earned the fifth seed, Western Michigan had three points and earned the sixth seed, while Kent State and one point and did not qualify for the tournament.

Seed	School	Conference Record	Points
1	Buffalo	7–0–4	25
2	Ball State	6–1–4	22
3	Bowling Green	6–2–3	21
4	Ohio	6–4–1	19
5	Miami (OH)	4–2–5	17
6	Western Michigan	5–4–2	17

== Bracket ==
Quarterfinals; Monday, Oct. 30
4	Ohio	0
5	Miami (OH)	1
3	Bowling Green	2
6	Western Michigan	0

Semifinals; Thursday, Nov. 3
1	Buffalo	1
5	Miami (OH)	0
2	Ball State (pen.)	1 (4)
3	Bowling Green	1 (2)

Final; Saturday, Nov. 6
1	Buffalo	2
2	Ball State	0

== Schedule ==
=== First Round ===
October 30	#3 Bowling Green	2–0	#6 Western Michigan	Bowling Green, OH
1:00 p.m. ET	Lexi Czerwien (yellow card) 28'; Alaina Uncapher 42'; Maya Dean 69'	Report	(yellow card) 65' Emily Pagett	Stadium: Chocrane Stadium; Attendance: 466; Referee: Shane Butler; Assistant referees: Kurt Wuebbels; Ryan Slack; Fourth official: Jason Cross

October 30	#4 Ohio	0–1	#5 Miami (OH)	Athens, OH
1:00 p.m. ET	Haley Miller (yellow card) 81'	Report	74' Taylor Hamlett	Stadium: Chessa Field; Attendance: 372; Referee: Michael Allie; Assistant referees: Jacob Little; Christian Vorovenci; Fourth official: Kendra Dalton

=== Semifinals ===
November 3	#1 Buffalo	1–0	#5 Miami (OH)	Buffalo, NY
5:00 p.m. ET	Olivia Bizzoni (yellow card) 12'; Hannah Callaghan 77'	Report	(yellow card) 31' Kylee Beinecke; (yellow card) 49' Emily Sexton; (yellow card) 62' Caroline Palmer	Stadium: UB Stadium; Attendance: 672; Referee: Eulogio Villalpando; Assistant referees: Justin Tatsak; Stephanie Serrano; Fourth official: Ted Grigoriou

November 3	#2 Ball State	1–1 (a.e.t.) (4–2 p)	#3 Bowling Green	Buffalo, NY
7:30 p.m. ET	Sammi Corcoran 19'	Report	57' Brynn Gardner	Stadium: UB Stadium; Attendance: 91; Referee: Art Arustamyan; Assistant referees: Besnik Rexhepi; Tim Dicken; Fourth official: Ted Grigoriou
	Penalties
	Sammi Corcoran (penalty scored); Tiffani Torres (penalty scored); Avery Fenchel (penalty scored); Jenna Dombrowski (penalty scored)		(penalty scored) Kennedy White; (penalty missed) Katie Cox; (penalty missed) Maya Dean

=== Final ===
November 6	#1 Buffalo	2–0	#2 Ball State	Buffalo, NY
1:00 p.m. ET	Leah Wengender 18'; Arianna Zumpano 74'; Jasmine Guerber (yellow card) 86'	Report	(yellow card) 28' Grace Alsop; (yellow card) 85' Sammi Corcoran; (yellow card) 90' Avery Fenchel; (yellow card) 90' Emily Roper	Stadium: UB Stadium; Attendance: 727; Referee: Calin Radosav; Assistant referees: Courtney Hayworth; Ashley Cedro; Fourth official: Ted Grigoriou

== Statistics ==
=== Goalscorers ===
There were 8 goals scored in 5 matches, for an average of 1.6 goals per match (as of November 6, 2022).

1 goal

- Sammi Corcoran – Ball State
- Maya Dean – Bowling Green
- Brynn Gardner – Bowling Green
- Alaina Uncapher – Bowling Green
- Hannah Callaghan – Buffalo
- Leah Wengender – Buffalo
- Arianna Zumpano – Buffalo
- Taylor Hamlett – Miami (OH)

== All-Tournament team ==
Player	Team
Maya Dean	Bowling Green
Isabelle Gilmore	Bowling Green
Emily Sexton	Miami (OH)
Maddie Schlecht	Miami (OH)
Sammi Corcoran	Ball State
Jenna Dombrowski	Ball State
Bethany Moser	Ball State
Emily Kelly	Buffalo
Leah Wengender	Buffalo
Tess Ford	Buffalo
**Hannah Callaghan**	Buffalo

MVP in bold
