= 2023 Mid-American Conference women's soccer tournament =

Postseason women's soccer tournament

- Classification: Division I
- Teams: 6
- Matches: 5
- Attendance: 1,289
- Site: WMU Soccer Complex (Semifinals and Final); Kalamazoo, Michigan
- Champions: Ohio (1st title)
- Winning coach: Aaron Rodgers (1st title)
- MVP: Scout Murray (Ohio)
- Broadcast: ESPN+

2023 Mid-American Conference women's soccer standings
	Conf.						Overall
Team	W		L		T	PCT	W		L		T	PCT
Western Michigan ‍†‍‍	8	–	0	–	3	.864	12	–	4	–	3	.711
Bowling Green ‍‍‍	8	–	1	–	2	.818	10	–	6	–	2	.611
Ball State ‍‍‍	6	–	2	–	3	.682	8	–	8	–	3	.500
Kent State ‍‍‍	7	–	4	–	0	.636	11	–	6	–	2	.632
Northern Illinois ‍‍‍	6	–	4	–	1	.591	8	–	8	–	3	.500
Buffalo ‍‍‍	4	–	4	–	3	.500	7	–	5	–	6	.556
Ohio ‍‍‡‍^{y}	4	–	4	–	3	.500	8	–	8	–	5	.500
Miami (OH) ‍‍‍	5	–	6	–	0	.455	8	–	10	–	1	.447
Toledo ‍‍‍	4	–	6	–	1	.409	7	–	9	–	2	.444
Central Michigan ‍‍‍	1	–	7	–	3	.227	2	–	8	–	6	.313
Eastern Michigan ‍‍‍	1	–	8	–	2	.182	1	–	12	–	6	.211
Akron ‍‍‍	1	–	9	–	1	.136	3	–	14	–	1	.194
† – Conference champion ‡ – 2023 MAC Tournament champion y – Invited to the NCAA Tournament; As of December 5, 2023; Rankings from United Soccer Coaches Poll; Source: Mid-American Conference

The 2023 Mid-American Conference women's soccer tournament was the postseason women's soccer tournament for the Mid-American Conference held from October 29 through November 5, 2023. The First Round was held at campus sites. The semifinals and finals took place at WMU Soccer Complex in Kalamazoo, Michigan, home of Western Michigan, the regular season conference champions. The six-team single-elimination tournament consisted of three rounds based on seeding from regular season conference play. The Buffalo Bulls were the defending champions, and they were unsuccessful in defending their title as they did not qualify for the tournament. The Ohio Bobcats finished as tournament champions from the sixth seed, defeating fourth seed Kent State in the final, 2–1. The title was the first in program history for the Buffalo women's soccer program and first for head coach Aaron Rodgers. As tournament champions, Ohio earned the Mid-American's automatic berth into the 2023 NCAA Division I women's soccer tournament.

== Seeding ==
Six Mid-American Conference schools participated in the tournament. Teams were seeded by conference record. A tiebreaker was required to determine the third and fourth seed as Ball State and Kent State both finished with 21 conference points. Ball State was awarded the third seed due to a 3–1 over Kent State on October 5. A tiebreaker was required to determine the sixth seed when defending champions Buffalo and Ohio both finished with 4–4–3 records during the regular season. Ohio defeated Buffalo 1–0 on September 24, and was therefore awarded the sixth spot in the tournament. Buffalo fell to seventh place and did not qualify for the tournament.

Seed	School	Conference Record	Points
1	Western Michigan	8–0–3	27
2	Bowling Green	8–1–2	26
3	Ball State	6–2–3	21
4	Kent State	7–4–0	21
5	Northern Illinois	6–4–1	19
6	Ohio	4–4–3	15

== Bracket ==
Quarterfinals; Monday, Oct. 29
4	Kent State	3
5	Northern Illinois	0
3	Ball State	0
6	Ohio	2

Semifinals; Thursday, Nov. 2
1	Western Michigan	1
4	Kent State	2
2	Bowling Green	1
6	Ohio	2

Final; Saturday, Nov. 5
4	Kent State	1
6	Ohio	2

== Schedule ==
=== First Round ===
October 29	#3 Ball State	0–2	#6 Ohio	Muncie, IN
1:00 p.m. ET	Sami Bird (yellow card) 77'	Report	14', (yellow card) 77' Shae Robertson; (yellow card) 42' Quintin Tostevin; (yellow card) 47' Aubrey Rea; 79' Izzi Boyd	Stadium: Briner Sports Complex; Attendance: 217; Referee: Nicholas Balcer; Assistant referees: Steve Besk; Audra Fullen; Fourth official: James Shunneson

October 29	#4 Kent State	3–0	#5 Northern Illinois	Kent, OH
1:00 p.m. ET	Callie Cunningham (yellow card) 15'; Alisa Arthur 36', (yellow card) 90'; Siena Stambolich 37'; Tori Copfer 85'	Report	(yellow card) 31' Tyra King; (yellow card) 57' Isabel Struble; (yellow card) 83' Sophia White	Stadium: Dix Stadium; Attendance: 389; Referee: Kevin Fikar; Assistant referees: Dylan Beck; Courtney Hayworth; Fourth official: Roy Miller

=== Semifinals ===
November 2	#2 Bowling Green	1–2	#6 Ohio	Kalamazoo, MI
11:00 a.m. ET	Christine Erdman 37'; Isabelle Gilmore (yellow card) 62'	Report	46' Rayann Pruss; 55' Scout Murray	Stadium: WMU Soccer Complex; Attendance: 175; Referee: Sorin Stoica; Assistant referees: Jeffery Mellen; Roy Miller; Fourth official: Steve Besk

November 2	#1 Western Michigan	1–2	#4 Kent State	Kalamazoo, MI
2:00 p.m. ET	Jenna Blackburn (yellow card) 49', (goal) 85'; Madi Canada (yellow card) 82'	Report	(yellow card) 8' Abby Breitschuh; 22' Alisa Arthur; 29' Callie Cunningham	Stadium: WMU Soccer Complex; Attendance: 326; Referee: Brian Miller; Assistant referees: Ali Zolgharnain; Noah Hartman; Fourth official: Steve Besk

=== Final ===
November 5	#4 Kent State	1–2	#6 Ohio	Kalamazoo, MI
1:00 p.m. ET	Alanna Raimondo 3'	Report	56' Kali Stock; 65' Scout Murray; (yellow card) 85' Carsyn Prigge	Stadium: WMU Soccer Complex; Attendance: 182; Referee: Art Arustamyan; Assistant referees: Peter Charpentier; Quinton McFarlen; Fourth official: Adrian Wericki

== Statistics ==
=== Goalscorers ===
There were 14 goals scored in 5 matches, for an average of 2.8 goals per match (as of November 5, 2023).

2 goals

- Alisa Arthur – Kent State
- Scout Murray – Ohio

1 goal

- Christine Erdman – Bowling Green
- Tori Copfer – Kent State
- Callie Cunningham – Kent State
- Alanna Raimondo – Kent State
- Siena Stambolich – Kent State
- Izzi Boyd – Ohio
- Rayann Pruss – Ohio
- Shae Robertson – Ohio
- Kali Stock – Ohio
- Jenna Blackburn – Western Michigan

== All-Tournament team ==
Player	Team
Isabelle Gilmore	Bowling Green
Makenzie Ortman	Bowling Green
Alisa Arthur	Kent State
Callie Cunningham	Kent State
Siena Stambolich	Kent State
Ever Berish	Ohio
**Scout Murray**	Ohio
Carsyn Prigge	Ohio
Celeste Sloma	Ohio
Madi Canada	Western Michigan
Bria Telemaque	Western Michigan

MVP in bold
