= 2025 Mid-American Conference women's soccer tournament =

Postseason women's soccer tournament

- Classification: Division I
- Teams: 6
- Matches: 5
- Attendance: 1,543
- Site: Historic Crew Stadium; Columbus, Ohio
- Champions: Western Michigan (5th title)
- Winning coach: Lewis Robinson (2nd title)
- MVP: Heidi Thomasma (Western Michigan)
- Broadcast: ESPN+

2025 Mid-American Conference women's soccer standings
	Conf.						Overall
Team	W		L		T	PCT	W		L		T	PCT
Western Michigan ‍†‍‡‍^{y}	10	–	1	–	1	.875	16	–	4	–	1	.786
Miami (OH) ‍‍‍	8	–	2	–	2	.750	11	–	5	–	3	.658
Buffalo ‍‍‍	8	–	3	–	1	.708	12	–	5	–	2	.684
Ball State ‍‍‍	7	–	4	–	1	.625	10	–	7	–	3	.575
Kent State ‍‍‍	6	–	4	–	2	.583	8	–	6	–	6	.550
Bowling Green ‍‍‍	4	–	1	–	7	.625	10	–	3	–	9	.659
Eastern Michigan ‍‍‍	4	–	4	–	4	.500	6	–	8	–	4	.444
Ohio ‍‍‍	3	–	5	–	4	.417	5	–	9	–	5	.395
Massachusetts ‍‍‍	3	–	6	–	2	.364	5	–	8	–	4	.412
Akron ‍‍‍	2	–	7	–	3	.292	5	–	9	–	4	.389
Northern Illinois ‍‍‍	2	–	7	–	2	.273	4	–	10	–	3	.324
Toledo ‍‍‍	1	–	7	–	4	.250	4	–	8	–	6	.389
Central Michigan ‍‍‍	1	–	8	–	3	.208	1	–	14	–	3	.139
† – Conference champion ‡ – 2025 MAC Tournament champion y – Invited to the NCAA Tournament; As of December 9, 2025; Rankings from United Soccer Coaches Poll; Source:Mid-American Conference

The 2025 Mid-American Conference women's soccer tournament was the postseason women's soccer tournament for the Mid-American Conference held from November 1 through November 7, 2025. The tournament was hosted at Historic Crew Stadium in Columbus, Ohio. The six-team single-elimination tournament consisted of three rounds based on seeding from regular season conference play. The Western Michigan Broncos were the defending champions. They successfully defended their title, defeating Bowling Green 1–0 in the Final. The title was the fifth in program history for the Western Michigan women's soccer program and second under head coach Lewis Robinson. As tournament champions, Western Michigan earned the Mid-American's automatic berth into the 2025 NCAA Division I women's soccer tournament.

== Seeding ==
The top six Mid-American Conference teams from the regular season earned berths in the tournament. Teams were seeded by conference record. No tiebreakers were required as the top seven teams finished with unique conference records and point totals.

Seed	School	Conference Record	Points
1	Western Michigan	10–1–1	31
2	Miami (OH)	8–2–2	26
3	Buffalo	8–3–1	25
4	Ball State	7–4–1	22
5	Kent State	6–4–2	20
6	Bowling Green	4–1–7	19

== Bracket ==
Quarterfinals; Saturday, Nov. 1
4	Ball State (pen.)	0 (5)
5	Kent State	0 (4)
3	Buffalo	0
6	Bowling Green (a.e.t.)	1

Semifinals; Tuesday, Nov. 4
1	Western Michigan	1
4	Ball state	0
2	Miami (OH)	0 (3)
6	Bowling Green (pen.)	0 (4)

Final; Friday, Nov. 7
1	Western Michigan	1
6	Bowling Green	0

== Schedule ==
=== First Round ===
November 1	(3) Buffalo	0–1 (a.e.t.)	(6) Bowling Green	Columbus, OH
1:00 p.m. EDT	Maya Galko (yellow card) 78'; Laiken Kiser (yellow card) 85'	Report	(yellow card) 76' Quinn O'Neil; (yellow card) 96' Lexi White; 107' Isabella Mazzaferro	Stadium: Historic Crew Stadium; Attendance: 413; Referee: Nicole Green; Assistant referees: Tyler Gregory; Maggie Short; Fourth official: Sarah Pierce

November 1	(4) Ball State	0–0 (a.e.t.) (5–4 p)	(5) Kent State	Columbus, OH
4:00 p.m. EDT		Report	(yellow card) 90' Samantha Miller	Stadium: Historic Crew Stadium; Attendance: 423; Referee: Christopher Spasovivi; Assistant referees: James Duling; Devon Duling; Fourth official: Alex Kallinicou
	Penalties
	Delaney Caldwell (penalty scored); Izzy Ross (penalty scored); Jess Fernau (penalty missed); Addie Chester (penalty missed); Emily Roper (penalty scored); Jordyn Klaasen (penalty missed); Fiona Kilian (penalty scored); Joy Zeeman (penalty scored)		(penalty scored) Kelsey Salopek; (penalty missed) Jules Dolinski; (penalty scored) Abby Breitschuh; (penalty scored) Allison Collins; (penalty missed) Josie Morgan; (penalty missed) Mia Cleroux; (penalty scored) Addy Cusick; (penalty missed) Kiyomi McCausland

=== Semifinals ===
November 4	(2) Miami (OH)	0–0 (a.e.t.) (3–4 p)	(6) Bowling Green	Columbus, OH
1:00 p.m. EST	Carolina Mortonson (yellow card) 67'; Shae Taylor (yellow card) 83'; Rachel Noonan (yellow card) 100'; Dominique Popa (yellow card) 109'	Report	(yellow card) 83' Ellie Pool; (yellow card) 94' Lauren Mahoney; (yellow card) 108' Emma Stransky; (yellow card) 109' Gabby Lamparty	Stadium: Historic Crew Stadium; Attendance: 179; Referee: Austin Saini; Assistant referees: Alex Kallinicou; Roy Miller; Fourth official: Aaron Mitchell
	Penalties
	Kayla Perfect (penalty missed); Katie O'Malley (penalty scored); Shae Taylor (penalty scored); Millie Cook (penalty scored); Jaden Sink (penalty missed)		(penalty scored) Emme Butera; (penalty scored) Minah Syam; (penalty scored) Emma Stransky; (penalty scored) Ellie Pool; (penalty missed) Gabby Lamparty

November 4	(1) Western Michigan	1–0	(4) Ball State	Columbus, OH
4:00 p.m. EST	Abby Baldridge 13'; Madi Canada (yellow card) 83'	Report		Stadium: Historic Crew Stadium; Attendance: 183; Referee: Herber Estrada; Assistant referees: Justin Talask; Jason Cross; Fourth official: Josh Braunstien

=== Final ===
November 7	(1) Western Michigan	1–0	(6) Bowling Green	Columbus, OH
7:30 p.m. EST	Heidi Thomasma 60'	Report		Stadium: Historic Crew Stadium; Attendance: 345; Referee: Victor Borges; Assistant referees: Colby Johnson; Shawn Westefield; Fourth official: Ben Miller

== Statistics ==
=== Goalscorers ===
There were 3 goals scored in 5 matches, for an average of 0.6 goals per match (as of November 7, 2025).

1 goal

- Isabella Mazzaferro – Bowling Green
- Abby Baldridge – Western Michigan
- Heidi Thomasma – Western Michigan

== All-Tournament team ==
Player	Team
Addie Chester	Ball State
Kate Pallante	Ball State
Taylor Green	Bowling Green
Audrey Oliver	Bowling Green
Payton O’Malley	Bowling Green
Dominque Popa	Miami (OH)
Shae Taylor	Miami (OH)
Ava Beckett	Western Michigan
Drew Martin	Western Michigan
**Heidi Thomasma**	Western Michigan
Meredith Vance	Western Michigan

MVP in bold
