= Lexi Fraley =

American soccer player (born 2003)

Personal information
- Full name: Alexa Fraley
- Date of birth: January 4, 2003 (age 23)
- Place of birth: Lafayette, Indiana, U.S.
- Height: 5 ft 2 in (1.57 m)
- Positions: Forward; midfielder

Youth career
- Indy Premier

College career
Years	Team	Apps	(Gls)
2021–2023	Ball State Cardinals	55	(19)
2024	Purdue Boilermakers	18	(1)

Senior career*
Years	Team	Apps	(Gls)
2026	DC Power FC	13	(0)
- * Club domestic league appearances and goals as of 01:42, May 18, 2026 (UTC)

Alexa Fraley (born January 4, 2003) is an American former professional soccer player who played as a forward or midfielder. She played college soccer for the Ball State Cardinals and the Purdue Boilermakers before spending half a year playing professionally for USL Super League club DC Power FC.

== Early life ==
Fraley was born and raised in Lafayette, Indiana. She played club soccer for Indy Premier, where she contributed to a state cup championship in 2019 and made it to the national championship in 2021. Fraley attended William Henry Harrison High School, where she was known as a prolific goalscorer. She set single-season goal records for Harrison as a junior and senior, eventually breaking the school's all-time record with 110 career goals. Her efforts helped the school win two conference and sectional championships in four years. Fraley received first-team all-conference awards after each of her seasons of play, as well as one all-state honorable mention. Fraley graduated from Harrison High as one of thirteen Class of 2021 valedictorians.

== College career ==
=== Ball State Cardinals ===
As a junior in high school, Fraley verbally committed to Ball State University. As a freshman in 2021, she appeared in all 16 of the Cardinals' matches. She netted her first collegiate goals in quick succession on October 3, 2021, scoring twice in a 3–1 comeback victory over Akron. She scored twice more on the year, becoming Ball State's joint top goalscorer for 2021, and was named to the Mid-American Conference (MAC) all-freshman team. In her second season at Ball State, Fraley was named to the All-MAC first team. She played a season-high 100 minutes in the semifinals of the MAC tournament, helping the Cardinals beat Bowling Green on penalties and advance to the final.

In 2023, Fraley was named first-team all-MAC for the second time. She won the MAC Offensive Player of the Year award, becoming the first Cardinal to do so in program history. Her 10 goals on the season (9 of which came in conference play) was tied for best in the MAC and made her the sixth player in Ball State history to register double digit goals in one season. Fraley's goalscoring record came from a large volume of attempts, as she led the MAC in both shots and shots on goal. United Soccer Coaches included her on the 2023 All-Midwest region second team.

=== Purdue Boilermakers ===
Ahead of her senior year of college, Fraley moved back home to Lafayette, enrolling in Purdue University. She appeared in all 18 games for the Boilermakers in 2024, making 12 starts. Fraley scored her only goal for Purdue on October 6, 2024, tallying in a loss against Illinois to end a personal scoring drought stretching over nearly a year. She also ended up registering one assist as a Boilermaker, coming in a victory against Rutgers on October 17.

== Club career ==
On January 28, 2026, USL Super League club DC Power FC announced that they had signed Fraley through the second half of the 2025–26 season, with a club option for another year. Fraley made her professional debut on February 7, 2026, coming on as a second-half substitute for Paige Almendariz in a victory over Sporting Club Jacksonville to start off the spring portion of the season. The following match, she made her first pro start and won a team-high 11 duels in a 1–1 draw with the Tampa Bay Sun. She went on to total 13 appearances for DC as the team failed to qualify for the playoffs for the second year in a row. In June 2026, Power FC opted to decline Fraley's contract option, releasing her after half a season.

Fraley announced her retirement from professional soccer on September 3, 2026.

== Honors and awards ==
Individual

- First-team all-MAC: 2022, 2023
- MAC all-freshman team: 2021
- Mid-American Conference Offensive Player of the Year: 2023
