= 2018 Mid-American Conference women's soccer tournament =

- Classification: Division I
- Teams: 8
- Matches: 7
- Attendance: 3,377
- Site: Mickey Cochrane Stadium (Semifinals and Final); Bowling Green, Ohio
- Champions: Bowling Green (3rd title)
- Winning coach: Matt Fannon (1st title)
- MVP: Elisa Baeron (Bowling Green)
- Broadcast: None

2018 Mid-American Conference women's soccer standings
	Conf.						Overall
Team	W		L		T	PCT	W		L		T	PCT
Bowling Green ‍†‍‡‍^{y}	10	–	1	–	0	.909	14	–	4	–	3	.738
Ball State ‍‍‍	8	–	2	–	1	.773	14	–	3	–	3	.775
Western Michigan ‍‍‍	7	–	4	–	0	.636	14	–	7	–	0	.667
Ohio ‍‍‍	6	–	3	–	2	.636	9	–	8	–	3	.525
Kent State ‍‍‍	6	–	4	–	1	.591	10	–	8	–	2	.550
Akron ‍‍‍	5	–	5	–	1	.500	8	–	10	–	2	.450
Buffalo ‍‍‍	5	–	6	–	0	.455	11	–	8	–	0	.579
Eastern Michigan ‍‍‍	5	–	6	–	0	.455	10	–	11	–	0	.476
Central Michigan ‍‍‍	5	–	6	–	0	.455	7	–	12	–	0	.368
Toledo ‍‍‍	4	–	6	–	1	.409	8	–	9	–	2	.474
Miami (OH) ‍‍‍	1	–	10	–	0	.091	3	–	14	–	1	.194
Northern Illinois ‍‍‍	1	–	10	–	0	.091	2	–	17	–	0	.105
† – Conference champion ‡ – 2018 MAC Tournament champion y – Invited to the NCAA tournament As of November 13, 2018; Rankings from United Soccer Coaches Poll; Source:Mid-American Conference

The 2018 Mid-American Conference women's soccer tournament was the postseason women's soccer tournament for the Mid-American Conference held from October 28 through November 4, 2018. The quarterfinals were held at campus sites. The semifinals and finals took place at Mickey Cochrane Stadium in Bowling Green, Ohio, home of the Bowling Green Falcons, the highest remaining seed in the tournament following the quarterfinal matches. The eight-team single-elimination tournament consisted of three rounds based on seeding from regular season conference play. The Toledo Rockets were the defending champions, but they did not qualify for the tournament after finishing 10th in the regular season. The Bowling Green Falcons won the tournament with a 5–4 penalty shootout win over the Ball State Cardinals in the final. The title was the third for the Bowling Green women's soccer program and the first for head coach Matt Fannon.

== Bracket ==
Quarterfinals; Sunday, Oct. 28
1	Bowling Green	2
8	Eastern Michigan	1
4	Ohio	2
5	Kent State	1
2	Ball State	2^{2OT}
7	Buffalo	1
3	Western Michigan	1
6	Akron	0

Semifinals; Friday, Nov. 2
1	Bowling Green	1
4	Ohio	0
2	Ball State	1^{2OT}
3	Western Michigan	0

Final; Sunday, Nov. 4
1	Bowling Green	1 (5)
2	Ball State	1 (4)

== Schedule ==
=== Quarterfinals ===
October 28, 2018	#1 Bowling Green	2–1	#8 Eastern Michigan	Bowling Green, Ohio
1:00 p.m. EST	Nikki Cox 1', 12'	Report	Team (yellow card) 45'; Kristin Nason 71'	Stadium: Mickey Cochrane Stadium; Attendance: 208; Referee: Calin Radosav; Assistant referees: Christian Little; Aaron Mitchell; Fourth official: Amy Willing

October 28, 2018	#4 Ohio	2–1	#5 Kent State	Athens, Ohio
1:00 p.m. EST	Mandy Arnzen 42' (yellow card) 77'; Sydney Leckie 68'	Report	Vital Kats 54'	Stadium: Chessa Field; Attendance: 525; Referee: Brian Miller; Assistant referees: Jeffrey Mellen; Tim Dicken

October 28, 2018	#2 Ball State	2–1 (a.e.t.)	#7 Buffalo	Muncie, Indiana
1:00 p.m. EST	Paula Guerrero 18' 104'	Report	Gurjeena Jandu 54' (yellow card) 104'; Tess Ford (yellow card) 87'	Stadium: Briner Sports Complex; Attendance: 202; Referee: Donovan Noocha; Assistant referees: Justin Tatsak; Jacob Little; Fourth official: Roger Blasey

October 28, 2018	#3 Western Michigan	1–0	#6 Akron	Kalamazoo, Michigan
1:00 p.m. EST	Morgan Otteson 26'	Report	Charley Kale (yellow card) 16'	Stadium: WMU Soccer Complex; Attendance: 375; Referee: Nicola Aleksic; Assistant referees: Sergio Alvarez; Zach Richter; Fourth official: Todd Abraham

=== Semifinals ===
November 2, 2018	#1 Bowling Green	1–0	#4 Ohio	Bowling Green, Ohio
4:00 p.m. EST	Jennifer Reyes 68'	Report		Stadium: Mickey Cochrane Stadium; Attendance: 580; Referee: Michael Kennedy; Assistant referees: Christopher Koloffon; Landon Albert; Fourth official: Ted Grigoriou

November 2, 2018	#2 Ball State	1–0 (a.e.t.)	#3 Western Michigan	Bowling Green, Ohio
7:00 p.m. EST	Western Michigan own goal 104'	Report		Stadium: Mickey Cochrane Stadium; Referee: Ceasar Ibarra; Assistant referees: Ramiro Talavera; Fernando Ibarra; Fourth official: Ted Grigoriou

=== Final ===
November 4, 2018	#1 Bowling Green	1–1 (a.e.t.) (5–4 p)	#2 Ball State	Bowling Green, Ohio
1:00 p.m. EST	Maureen Kennedy 26'	Report	Emily Simmons 53'	Stadium: Mickey Cochrane Stadium; Attendance: 1,487; Referee: Nikola Aleksic; Assistant referees: John Safar; Jeffrey Mellen; Fourth official: Ted Grigoriou
	Penalties
	Chelsea Washington (penalty scored); Maureen Kennedy (penalty missed); Erica Hubert (penalty scored); Nikki Cox (penalty scored); Morgan Abbitt (penalty scored); Elisa Baeron (penalty scored)		Shelby Kean (penalty scored); Emily Simmons (penalty scored); Sammi Corcoran (penalty scored); Kerrigan Johnson (penalty scored); Jenna Dombrowski (penalty missed); Tatiana Mason (penalty missed)

== Statistics ==
=== Goalscorers ===
2 Goals

- Nikki Cox - Bowling Green
- Paula Guerrero - Ball State

1 Goal

- Mandy Arnzen - Ohio
- Gurjeena Jandu - Buffalo
- Vital Kats - Kent State
- Maureen Kennedy - Bowling Green
- Sydney Leckie - Ohio
- Kristin Nason - Eastern Michigan
- Morgan Otteson - Western Michigan
- Jennifer Reyes - Bowling Green
- Emily Simmons - Ball State

Own Goals

- Western Michigan vs. Ball State

== All-Tournament team ==
Player	Team
Tristin Stuteville	Ball State
Lauren Roll	Ball State
Taylor Pooley	Ball State
Jennifer Reyes	Bowling Green
Nikhita Jacob	Bowling Green
Nikki Cox	Bowling Green
Elisa Baeron	Bowling Green (MVP)
Mandy Arnzen	Ohio
Rianna Reese	Ohio
Alyssa Burke	Western Michigan
Paige Dobbs	Western Michigan

== See also ==
- 2018 MAC Men's Soccer Tournament
