= Paige Culver =

Canadian soccer player (born 1997)

Personal information
- Full name: Paige Alexandra Culver
- Date of birth: April 4, 1997 (age 29)
- Place of birth: Oakville, Ontario, Canada
- Height: 1.76 m (5 ft 9 1/2 in)
- Position: Defender

Youth career
- 2002–2015: Oakville SC

College career
Years	Team	Apps	(Gls)
2015–2018	Kent State Golden Flashes	80	(4)

Senior career*
Years	Team	Apps	(Gls)
2014	Toronto Lady Lynx	12	
2018	Hamilton United	6	(1)
2019	Oakville Blue Devils FC	8	(1)
2019–2020	Pink Bari	15	(0)
2020–2021	Soyaux	6	(0)
2021	Bordeaux	0	(0)
2022	IFK Kalmar	24	(0)
2023	Turbine Potsdam	11	(0)
2023–2024	London City Lionesses	15	(0)
Total		97	(2)
- * Club domestic league appearances and goals as of March 31, 2024

Paige Alexandra Culver (born April 4, 1997) is a Canadian former soccer player.

== Early life ==
Culver played youth soccer with Oakville SC for 13 years. She also played with the Ontario Provincial Team from 2010 to 2013, where she was named team captain and was also part of the National Training Centre during that time.

== College career ==
In 2015, she began attending Kent State University, where she played for the women's soccer team. On October 4, 2015, she scored her first collegiate goal in a victory over the Northern Illinois Huskies. At the end of her freshman season, she was named to the MAC All-Freshman Team, the All-MAC Second Team, and the All-Ohio Second Team. At the end of her sophomore season, Culver was named to the All-MAC First Team, All-Ohio Second Team, and earned Academic All-MAC honors. In her junior season, she was named the MAC Defensive Player of The Year. She was also named to the All-MAC First Team, Academic All-MAC, All-Ohio First Team, All-Ohio Academic First Team, All-Midwest Region First Team, Scholar All-America First Team, and a Third-Team All-American. After her senior season in 2018, she was named to the All-MAC First Team, the All-Midwest Region Third Team, and Academic All-MAC, and was a nominee for the Senior CLASS Award. She also served as team captain at Kent State.

== Club career ==
In 2014, Culver played with the Toronto Lady Lynx in the USL W-League, starting every match.

In 2018, Culver played with Hamilton United in League1 Ontario. In 2019, she played with the Oakville Blue Devils.

In August 2019, Culver signed with Italian Serie A club Pink Bari.

In June 2020, Culver signed with French Division 1 Féminine club ASJ Soyaux-Charente. At the end of the season, she departed the club.

In July 2021, Culver signed with Girondins de Bordeaux on a two-year contract. In December 2021, she terminated the remainder of her contract by mutual consent.

In December 2021, she signed with IFK Kalmar in the Swedish first tier Damallsvenskan. After finishing pre-season, she was named the club's captain. At the end of the 2022 season, she departed the club.

In January 2023, Culver signed with German club Turbine Potsdam in the first tier Frauen-Bundesliga. In May 2023, she announced her departure from the club.

In September 2023, Culver signed with the London City Lionesses in England's Women's Championship on a one-year contract.

In April 2024, Culver announced her retirement from the sport, due to a career-ending injury.
