= Amy Carr =

English footballer (1991–2026)

Personal information
- Date of birth: 27 April 1991
- Place of birth: St Albans, England
- Date of death: 9 March 2026 (aged 34)
- Place of death: England
- Position: Goalkeeper

Youth career
- 2005–2006: Arsenal
- 2006–2008: Chelsea
- 2009–2010: Chelsea

College career
Years	Team	Apps	(Gls)
2010–2013	Northern Illinois Huskies	65	(0)

Senior career*
Years	Team	Apps	(Gls)
2008–2009	Reading		
2014–2015	IL Sandviken		

International career
2007–2008	England U17	12	(0)
2009	England U19	4	(0)
- * Club domestic league appearances and goals

Amy Carr (27 April 1991 – 9 March 2026) was an English footballer who played as a goalkeeper.

== Club career ==
Carr began her youth career in the academy of Arsenal in 2005 before joining the academy of Chelsea in 2006 where she won the Centre of Excellence League Championship and the Dana Cup. She joined the senior Reading team in 2008 and was part of the team which gained promotion to the Premier League Northern Division by being unbeaten during the 2007–08 South West Combination Women's Football League. She returned to the Chelsea academy for the 2009–10 season as the club finished second in the National Reserve League.

She initially planned to join the Ole Miss Rebels but instead joined the Northern Illinois Huskies soccer team in the Mid-American Conference during 2010 as the club finished in fifth place, and in 2012 became the first All-MAC goalkeeper in NIU history. After she graduated, she joined 1. divisjon club IL Sandviken on 10 April 2014. She retired in 2015, at the age of 23.

== International career ==
=== England U17 ===
Carr debuted for England U17 during the team's inaugural 13–0 victory against Georgia U17 on 27 October 2007 during 2008 UEFA Women's Under-17 Championship qualification, and she represented England U17 at the 2008 UEFA Women's Under-17 Championship and the 2008 FIFA U-17 Women's World Cup where England U17 finished in fourth place in both tournaments.

=== England U19 ===
Carr then represented England U19 during 2009 UEFA Women's Under-19 Championship qualification.

== Personal life and death ==
Carr was born on 27 April 1991 in St Albans, England. She grew up in Hemel Hempstead.

She had three seizures in May 2013, October 2014, and February 2015, which led to her being diagnosed with a cancerous brain tumour and retiring from football. She then moved back to England and believed the cancer was in remission until it returned in December 2024 and she was told it was terminal.

Carr died on 13 March 2026, at the age of 34.

== Career statistics ==
Appearances and goals by club, season and competition
Club	Season	League		
Club	Season	Division	Apps	Goals
Northern Illinois Huskies	2010	Mid-American Conference	19	0
Northern Illinois Huskies	2011	Mid-American Conference	18	0
Northern Illinois Huskies	2012	Mid-American Conference	18	0
Northern Illinois Huskies	2013	Mid-American Conference	20	0
Career total			65	0

== Honours ==
Reading

- South West Combination Women's Football League: 2007–08
