= Mid-American Conference Volleyball Tournament =

NCAA postseason single-elimination volleyball tournament

Mid-American Conference women's volleyball tournament
- Conference volleyball championship
- Sport: Volleyball
- Conference: Mid-American Conference
- Number of teams: 6
- Format: Single-elimination tournament
- Current stadium: Worthen Arena
- Current location: Muncie, Indiana
- Played: 1980–82, 1987-present
- Last contest: 2025
- Current champion: Toledo Rockets
- Most championships: Ohio Bobcats (9)
- Official website: getsomemaction.com – Women's Volleyball

The Mid-American Conference women's volleyball tournament is the postseason single-elimination tournament for the NCAA Division I Mid-American Conference (MAC). The winner of the tournament receives the MAC's automatic bid to the NCAA Division I women's volleyball tournament. Since 2021, the top six teams in conference play qualify for the tournament. The tournament was typically hosted by the regular season champion, though it has also been held at neutral sites including Battle Creek, Michigan (1990-93), the SeaGate Centre in Toledo, Ohio (2005-10), and Geneva, Ohio (2011-13). Starting in 2025, the regular-season champion from the prior season was named the host of that year's tournament, resulting in Bowling Green hosting the 2025 tournament, while Ball State will host in 2026 as the 2025 regular season champions.

== Format ==
On May 12, 2020, the MAC announced a series of changes to its competitive format in multiple sports in response to fallout from the COVID-19 pandemic; these changes took effect in the 2020–21 school year and were planned to last through at least 2023–24.

In the first MAC Volleyball Tournament in 1980, there was no regular season conference play, so all nine teams went to the tournament and were split into two pools, with the 'Pool A' winner playing the 'Pool B' runner-up in one semifinal with the 'Pool B' winner facing the 'Pool A' runner-up in the other. Starting in 1982, that format was abandoned as regular-season play was introduced, with only the top four teams in conference play going to the tournament.

In 1983, the conference stopped having a tournament until 1986, with the regular-season champion earning the league's automatic bid to the NCAA Division I women's volleyball tournament. In 1987, postseason play returned with the top four teams entering the tournament.

From 1997-2002 and 2011-2019, the tournament involved the top eight teams in the conference standings. From 2003-2010 all teams in the conference made the tournament. For the 2020 season, played in spring 2021 due to the COVID-19 pandemic, only the top four teams made the tournament, and since the fall 2021 season it has been a six-team tournament with the top two seeds getting a bye to the semifinals while lower seeds play in a quarterfinal round.

Teams are seeded by conference record using a series of specified tiebreakers when necessary.

== Yearly results ==
Year	Champion	Score	Runner-up	Tournament MVP	Location
1980	Miami	3-2	Central Michigan	none	DeKalb, Illinois
1981	Miami	3-1	Central Michigan	none	Mount Pleasant, Michigan
1982	(3) Western Michigan	3-0	(2) Central Michigan	none	Athens, Ohio
1983-86	No Tournament				
1987	(1) Western Michigan	3-0	(2) Bowling Green	none	Kalamazoo, Michigan
1988	(1) Western Michigan	3-0	(3) Eastern Michigan	none	Kalamazoo, Michigan
1989	(2) Western Michigan	3-2	(1) Bowling Green	Joanne Bingham, Western Michigan	Bowling Green, Ohio
1990	(1) Miami	3-2	(2) Eastern Michigan	Angel Miller, Miami	Battle Creek, Michigan
1991	(1) Bowling Green	3-0	(2) Miami	Tammy Schiller, Bowling Green	Battle Creek, Michigan
1992	(2) Ball State	3-2	(1) Bowling Green	April Hoeltke, Ball State	Battle Creek, Michigan
1993	(1) Ball State	3-1	(2) Bowling Green	Cassy Herode, Ball State	Battle Creek, Michigan
1994	(1) Ball State	3-2	(3) Miami	Carin Zielinski, Ball State	Muncie, Indiana
1995	(3) Ball State	3-2	(1) Miami	Wendy Carter, Ball State	Oxford, Ohio
1996	(1) Miami	3-0	(3) Kent State	Jessica Stout, Miami	Oxford, Ohio
1997	(2) Northern Illinois	3-1	(1) Miami	Beth Burkholder, Northern Illinois	Oxford, Ohio
1998	(1) Miami	3-0	(3) Northern Illinois	Alissia Thompson, Miami	Oxford, Ohio
1999	(1) Ball State	3-0	(2) Western Michigan	Emily Sallee, Ball State	Muncie, Indiana
2000	(1) Western Michigan	3-1	(2) Ball State	Zakiya Pope, Western Michigan	Kalamazoo, Michigan
2001	(1) Northern Illinois	3-0	(3) Ball State	Jenny Bowman, Northern Illinois	DeKalb, Illinois
2002	(1) Ball State	3-0	(4) Eastern Michigan	Katie Butts, Ball State	Muncie, Indiana
2003	(1) Ohio	3-0	(7) Marshall	Laura Hageman, Ohio	Muncie, Indiana
2004	(1) Ohio	3-0	(3) Marshall	Briana Adamovsky, Ohio	Bowling Green, Ohio
2005	(1) Ohio	3-0	(3) Ball State	Savanah Parra, Ohio	SeaGate Centre
2006	(1) Ohio	3-0	(3) Bowling Green	Melissa Griffin, Ohio	SeaGate Centre
2007	(3) Miami	3-0	(1) Ohio	Carli Reihman, Miami	SeaGate Centre
2008	(2) Ohio	3-1	(1) Western Michigan	Ellen Herman, Ohio	SeaGate Centre
2009	(1) Ohio	3-1	(2) Western Michigan	Sarah Petrulis, Ohio	SeaGate Centre
2010	(2) Ohio	3-0	(4) Northern Illinois	Sue Jacobi, Ohio	SeaGate Centre
2011	(6) Central Michigan	3-2	(1) Northern Illinois	Kaitlin Schultz, Central Michigan	Geneva, Ohio
2012	(2) Bowling Green	3-2	(4) Northern Illinois	Paige Penrod, Bowling Green	Geneva, Ohio
2013	(1) Ohio	3-0	(7) Eastern Michigan	Meredith Ashy, Ohio	Geneva, Ohio
2014	(5) Western Michigan	3-2	(1) Miami	Lexie Pawlik, Western Michigan	Convocation Center (Ohio)
2015	(2) Ohio	3-0	(1) Northern Illinois	Abby Gilleland, Ohio	Convocation Center (Ohio)
2016	(2) Northern Illinois	3-0	(1) Miami	Mary Grace Kelly, Northern Illinois	Convocation Center (NIU)
2017	(1) Miami	3-0	(6) Western Michigan	Olivia Rusek, Miami	Millett Hall
2018	(5) Eastern Michigan	3-2	(2) Miami	Cassie Haut, Eastern Michigan	Millett Hall
2019	(4) Ball State	3-2	(3) Bowling Green	Kia Holder, Ball State	Stroh Center
2020 (played spring 2021)	(1) Bowling Green	3-1	(2) Western Michigan	Katelyn Meyer, Bowling Green	Stroh Center
2021 (fall)	(1) Ball State	3-2	(2) Bowling Green	Natalie Risi, Ball State	Worthen Arena
2022	(2) Bowling Green	3-2	(1) Ball State	Lauryn Hovey, Bowling Green	Worthen Arena
2023	(1) Western Michigan	3-2	(6) Bowling Green	Logan Case, Western Michigan	University Arena (WMU)
2024	(4) Western Michigan	3-0	(3) Ball State	Logan Case, Western Michigan	Stroh Center
2025	(4) Toledo	3–1	(2) Western Michigan	Jessica Costlow, Toledo	Stroh Center
2026					Worthen Arena

== Performance by school ==
School	Tenure	Championships	Championship years
Ohio	1980–present	9	2003, 2004, 2005, 2006, 2008, 2009, 2010, 2013, 2015
Western Michigan	1980–present	8*	1982, *1983, *1984, *1985, *1986, 1987, 1988, 1989, 2000, 2014, 2023, 2024
Ball State	1980–present	8	1992, 1993, 1994, 1995, 1999, 2002, 2019, 2021
Miami	1980–present	7	1980, 1981, 1990, 1996, 1998, 2007, 2017
Bowling Green	1981–present	4	1991, 2012, 2020, 2022
Northern Illinois	1982–1985; 1997–2025	3	1997, 2001, 2016
Central Michigan	1980–present	1	2011
Eastern Michigan	1980–present	1	2018
Toledo	1980–present	1	2025
Akron	1992–present	0	—
Buffalo	1998–present	0	—
Kent State	1980–present	0	—
Marshall	1997–2004	0	—
*There was no MAC Tournament from 1983-86. The regular season champion received the conference's automatic bid to the NCAA Tournament

Former conference members shaded in ██ silver

== See also ==
- Mid-American Conference men's basketball tournament
- Mid-American Conference women's basketball tournament
