= Mickey Cochrane Stadium =

Soccer-specific stadium in Bowling Green, Ohio

Cochrane Stadium
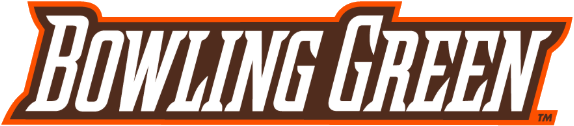

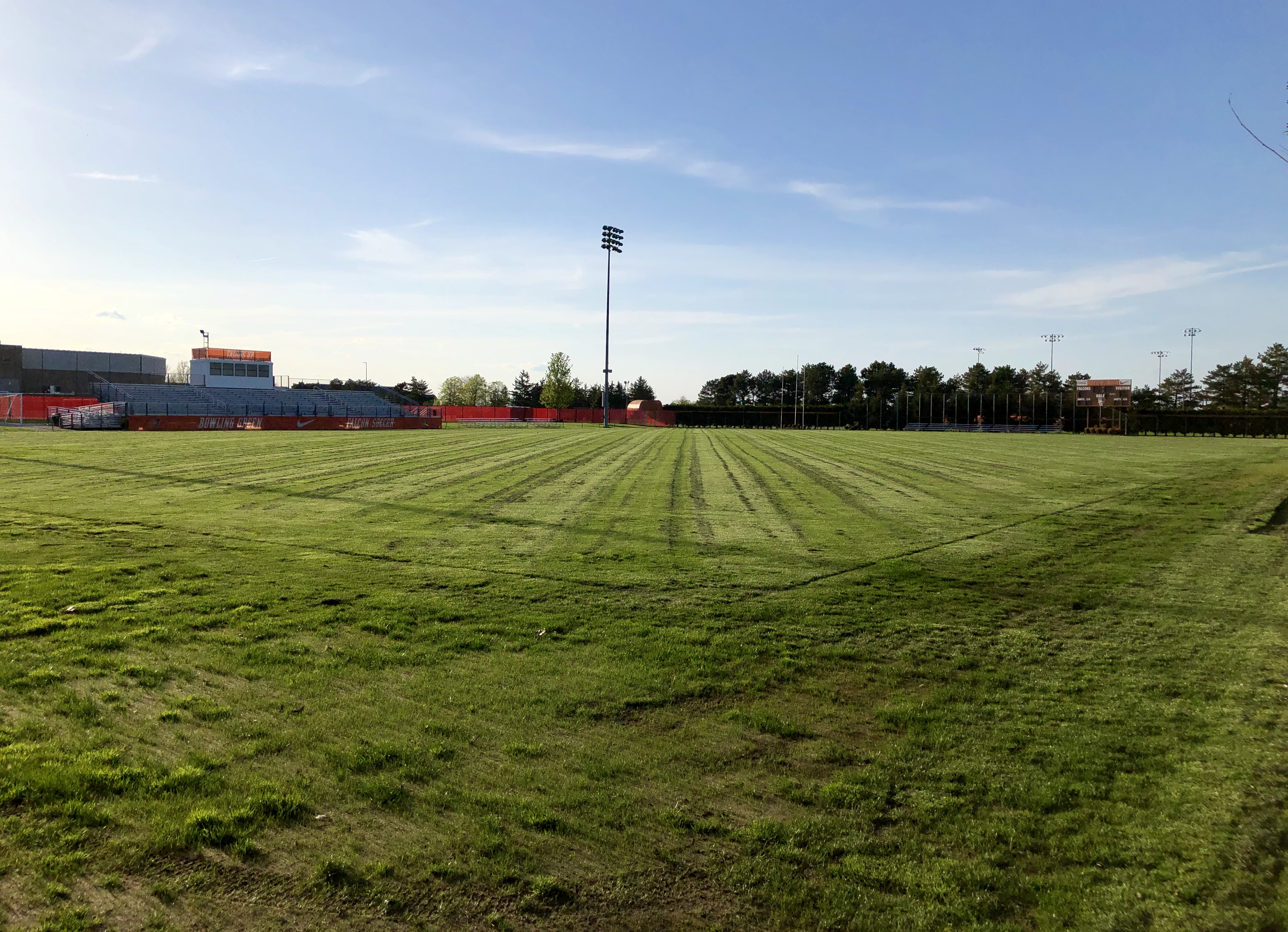
- View of the stadium pitch in 2019
- Interactive map of Cochrane Stadium
- Full name: Mickey Cochrane Stadium
- Address: Bowling Green, Ohio; United States
- Coordinates: 41°22′44″N 83°37′34″W
- Owner: Bowling Green State University
- Operator: Bowling Green Athletics
- Capacity: 1,500
- Type: Stadium
- Current use: Soccer

Construction
- Opened: September 10, 1995; 31 years ago

Tenants
- Bowling Green Falcons (NCAA) teams: men's and women's soccer; MAC women's tournament final (2005, 2018–2021)

Website
- bgsufalcons.com/cochrane-stadium

Mickey Cochrane Stadium is a soccer-specific stadium located in Bowling Green, Ohio.

The stadium is home to the Bowling Green Falcons men's and women's varsity soccer teams. The field was named after Mickey Cochrane in 1980. The field was enclosed in 1993, and a scoreboard added in 1994, turning the field into a stadium.

Cochrane was a professional baseball player, manager and coach. He is considered one of the best catchers in baseball history and became member of the Baseball Hall of Fame. In his first season as manager, he led the Tigers to 101 wins, which was the most for a rookie manager for 27 years (since Cochrane, six other managers have won 100 games as a rookie).

The stadium was venue to the Mid-American Conference women's soccer tournament finals in 2005, and 2018–2021. Bowling Green won all the finals played at Cochrane Stadium.
