= Bowling Green Falcons =

Intercollegiate sports teams of Bowling Green State University

- University: Bowling Green State University
- Conference: Mid-American (primary); CCHA (men's hockey); Missouri Valley (men's soccer)
- NCAA: Division I (FBS)
- Athletic director: Derek van der Merwe
- Location: Bowling Green, Ohio
- Varsity teams: 7 men & 10 women
- Football stadium: Doyt Perry Stadium
- Basketball arena: Stroh Center
- Ice hockey arena: Slater Family Ice Arena
- Baseball stadium: Steller Field
- Other venues: Anderson Arena; Mickey Cochrane Stadium
- Mascot: Freddie and Frieda Falcon
- Nickname: Falcons
- Fight song: "Forward Falcons" "Ay Ziggy Zoomba"
- Colors: Brown and orange
- Website: bgsufalcons.com
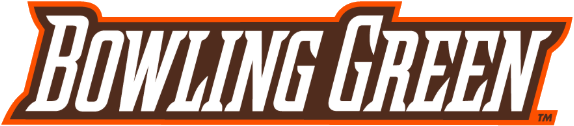

The Bowling Green Falcons are the intercollegiate athletic teams that represent Bowling Green State University (BGSU), in Bowling Green, Ohio, United States. The Falcons compete in the National Collegiate Athletic Association (NCAA) at the Division I level as a member of the Mid-American Conference (MAC) East Division. The men's ice hockey team competes in the Central Collegiate Hockey Association (CCHA); and men's soccer competes in the Missouri Valley Conference (MVC), following the MAC shutting down its men's soccer league at the end of the 2022 season. Bowling Green sponsors teams in seven men's and 11 women's NCAA-sanctioned sports and the football team competes in the Football Bowl Subdivision (FBS), the highest level for college football. BGSU is one of only 15 universities in the United States that plays Division I FBS football and Division I men's ice hockey.

The Falcons' main rivals are the Toledo Rockets from the University of Toledo, separated by 20 miles (32 km) of Interstate 75 in northwestern Ohio, a rivalry contested in several sports. The best known of these games is the annual football game, known as the Battle of I-75. Originally, the winner of the game was awarded the Peace Pipe, a Native American peace pipe placed upon a wood tablet. Since 2011, the winner is awarded a bronzed I-75 road sign.

The 1984 Falcons hockey team defeated Minnesota–Duluth in the longest college hockey championship game in history, to win the NCAA national championship, Bowling Green's first and only Division I national championship.

== Sports sponsored ==
Men's sports	Women's sports
Baseball	Basketball
Basketball	Cross country
Cross country	Golf
Football	Gymnastics
Golf	Soccer
Ice hockey	Softball
Soccer	Swimming and diving
	Tennis
	Track and field^{1}
	Volleyball
^{1} – includes both indoor and outdoor

=== Baseball ===
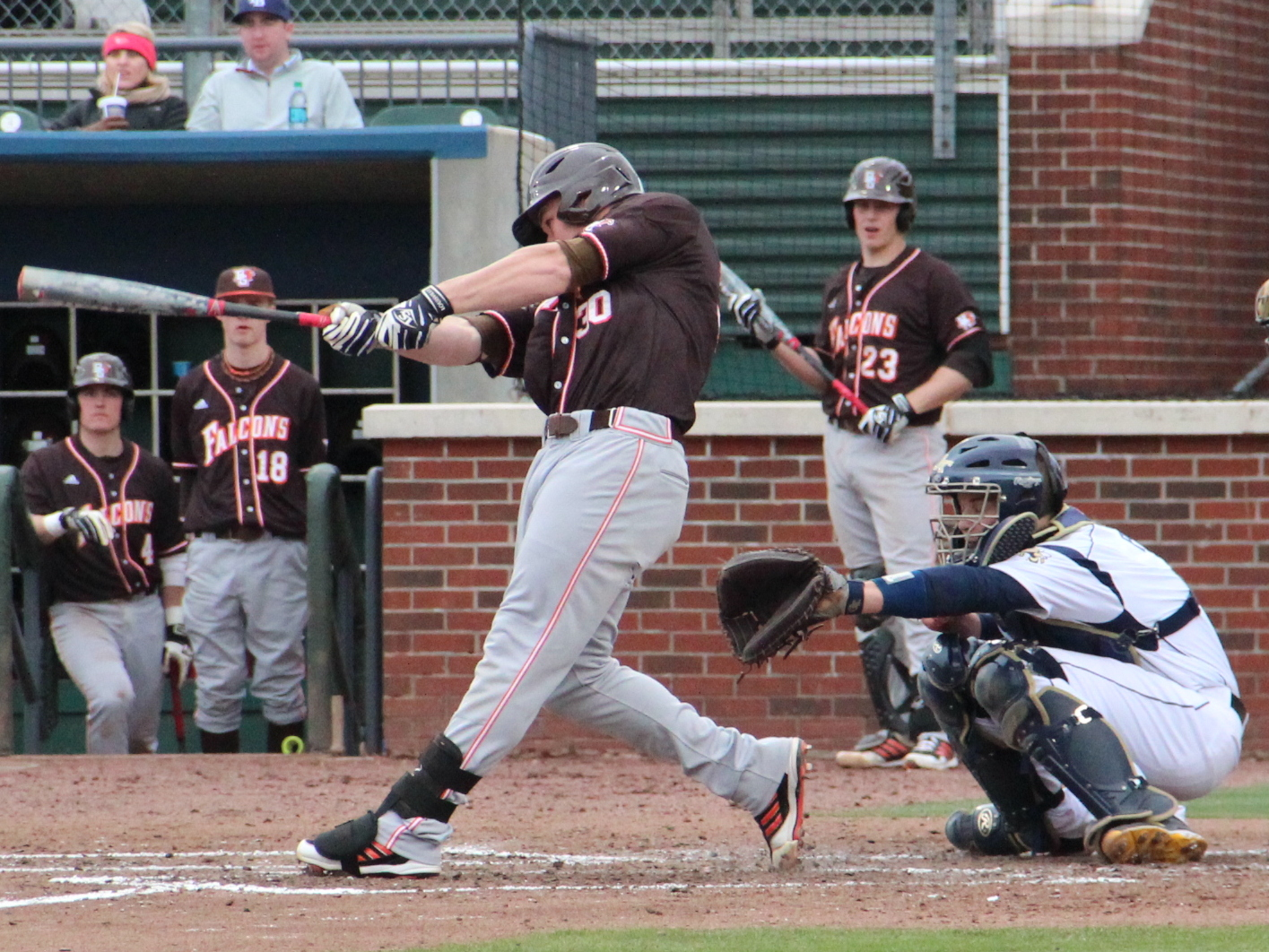
A Bowling Green baseball game in 2014

Baseball was founded in 1915 as one of the university's first varsity sports. The program won five MAC championships and four NCAA regional appearances as well as produced 49 Major League Baseball draft picks. After 105 years, the sport was dropped at the varsity level effective immediately on May 15, 2020, as part of the budget cuts due to the ongoing coronavirus pandemic.

On June 2, 2020, just weeks later, the school announced it was reinstating baseball after they fund-raised $1.5 million of commitments over the next three years.

=== Men's basketball ===
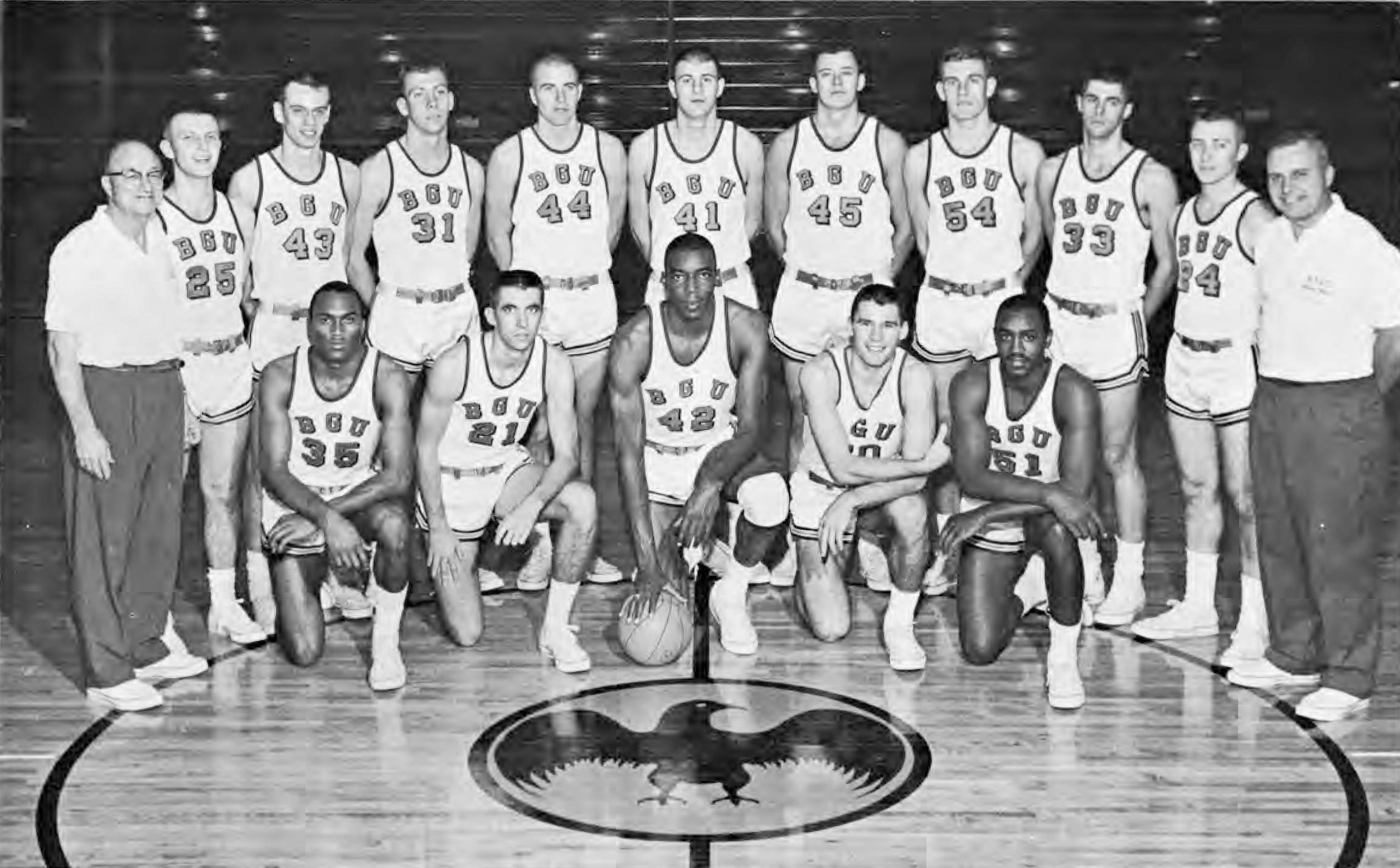
1962–63 team that competed in NCAA tournaments

The Falcons have appeared in four NCAA Tournaments. Their combined record is 1–5. Their drought of 55 years (as of 2026) is tied for the third longest active and fourth longest all time between tournament appearances.

- MAC titles: 1959, 1960, 1962, 1963, 1968, 1981, 1983, 1997, 2000, 2009
- MAC East division titles: 2000, 2009
- NCAA tournament appearances: 1959, 1962, 1963, 1968
- NIT appearances: 1944, 1945, 1946, 1948, 1949, 1954, 1980, 1983, 1990, 1991, 1997, 2000, 2002, 2009
- NIT Runner-up: 1945
- NIT 3rd place: 1949

=== Women's basketball ===
Bowling Green colors the Mid-American Conference

The Bowling Green Falcons women's basketball team has had a long-standing tradition of success, rivaling only the school's football team as the most prominent athletic team at the university. The women's basketball team has won ten conference tournaments, eleven regular season championships and five division championships. The women's basketball team has made the NCAA tournament nine times and the AIAW tournament (the predecessor to the NCAA tournament) twice, posting an overall tournament record of 6–12. The 2006–07 team became the first women's basketball team from the MAC to reach the Sweet Sixteen after defeating 10th-seeded Oklahoma State 70–60 and upset 2nd-seeded Vanderbilt 60–59.

The current head coach of the Falcons is Jennifer Roos. In her first full season as head coach, Roos led the team to the third round of the WNIT. Roos served on the staff of previous BGSU Women's Basketball head coach Curt Miller, who had over 200 wins record in 10 season as head coach. Miller also led the Falcons to five conference tournament championships and six consecutive regular season championships (2005–10).

- MAC titles: 1987, 1988, 1989, 1993, 1994, 2005, 2006, 2007, 2008, 2009, 2010, 2012, 2014
- MAC Tournament titles: 1987, 1988, 1989, 1990, 1993, 1994, 2005, 2006, 2007, 2010, 2011
- NCAA Tournament appearances: 1987, 1988, 1989, 1990, 1993, 1994, 2005, 2006, 2007, 2010, 2011
- NCAA Sweet Sixteen: 2007
- WNIT appearances: 1998, 2008, 2009, 2012, 2013, 2014
- AIAW Tournament appearances: 1974, 1975

=== Football ===
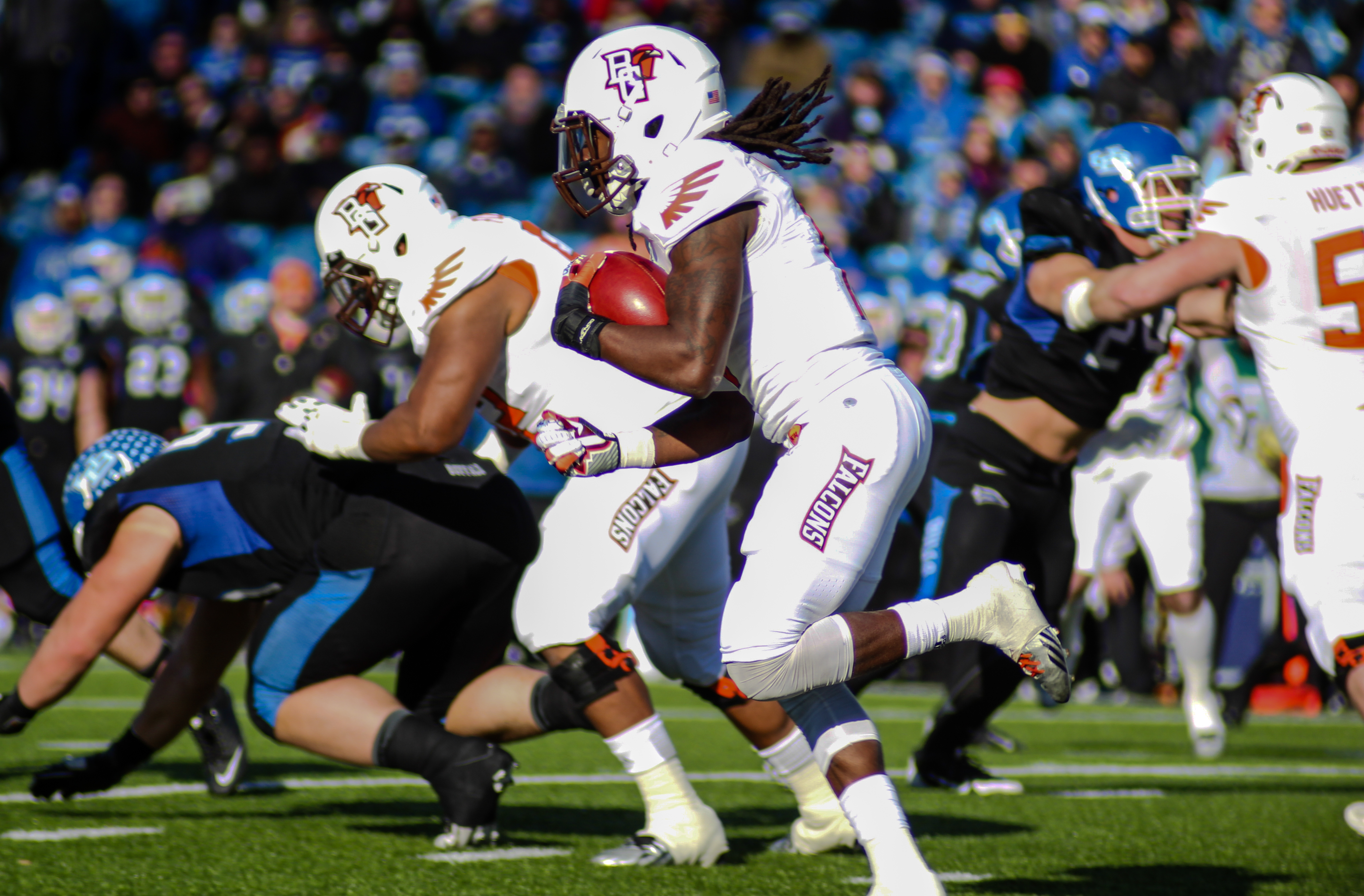
A Bowling Green v Buffalo game in 2013

The Bowling Green Falcons football team plays at Doyt Perry Stadium on the east end of the BGSU campus. The Falcons are a historical MAC powerhouse winning ten conference championships, second only to rival Miami (Ohio) (13). Bowling Green has three prominent rivals including Miami (Ohio) and Kent State, but their fiercest rival is Toledo, with the two competing in the Battle of I-75 with the game's winner taking home the Peace Pipe trophy.

The Falcons and Kent State also compete for the Anniversary Award which commemorates the two institutions' founding in 1910 with the passing of the Lowry bill. Famous Falcon football players include Kory Lichtensteiger, Shaun Suisham and Don Nehlen (who would also become head football coach at Bowling Green). Notable Bowling Green coaches include College Football Hall of Fame members Doyt Perry and Don Nehlen, as well as Ohio State coach Urban Meyer.

- MAC titles: 1956, 1959, 1961, 1962, 1964, 1965, 1982, 1985, 1991, 1992, 2013, 2015
- MAC East division titles: 2007, 2013, 2014, 2015
- MAC West division titles: 2003
- NWOIAA titles: 1921, 1922, 1925, 1928, 1929
- National titles: 1959
- Undefeated seasons: 1928, 1956, 1959
- Bowl appearances: 1982, 1985, 1991, 1992, 2003, 2004, 2007, 2009, 2012, 2013, 2014, 2015, 2022, 2023, 2024

=== Gymnastics ===
The Bowling Green Gymnastics team trains and competes in Anderson Arena located within Memorial Hall on campus. Head coach Kerrie Turner is assisted by coaches Sunny Marchand and Juliana Belar. The team is managed by sophomore Alyssa Page and the trainer is graduate assistant Annie Rastovski. The team is to compete at the MAC Gymnastics Conference Championship in Kalamazoo, Michigan after the 2020 competition was cancelled due to COVID-19.

=== Ice hockey ===
The Bowling Green Falcons men's ice hockey team is the only athletic program at Bowling Green State University to win a national title, coming during the 1984 NCAA Division I Men's Ice Hockey Tournament in Lake Placid, New York. The Falcons defeated Minnesota–Duluth 5–4 in the fourth overtime. The game is the longest NCAA men's ice hockey game ever played. The game was broadcast on WBGU, called by John Bowers. John is now with the Cleveland Guardians. Prominent coaches Ron Mason and Jerry York spent time as head coaches at Bowling Green before leaving for very successful stints at Michigan State and Boston College respectively.

The Falcons are currently coached by Ty Eigner, a former Bowling Green player who succeeded Chris Bergeron after the 2018–19 season following nine seasons as an assistant under Bergeron.

- CCHA titles: 1976, 1978, 1979, 1982, 1983, 1984, 1987
- CCHA tournament titles: 1973, 1977, 1978, 1979, 1988
- NCAA tournament appearances: 1977, 1978, 1979, 1982, 1984, 1987, 1988, 1989, 1990, 2019
- National titles: 1984
- Frozen Four appearances: 1978, 1984

== Discontinued sports ==
=== Electric Car Racing ===
In 1993 students at the College of Technology began constructing the Electric Falcon electric race car, and finished it by 1994. The Electric Falcon Motorsports Team won championships in 2001 and 2003. The last year the team raced in the Formula Lightning Racing Series was on October 3, 2004, in Lexington, Ohio, where it competed against nine other universities. The Electric Falcon was donated to the Crawford Auto-Aviation Museum in 2010. The team was briefly restarted in 2011 to compete in the Electric Vehicle Grand Prix. The team placed 8th in 2011, 2nd and 6th in 2012 with two vehicles, and competed in 2013.

== Facilities ==
=== Doyt Perry Stadium ===
Doyt Perry Stadium is home to Bowling Green's football team. Named in honor of former football coach Doyt Perry, the stadium was opened in 1966 replacing University Stadium. Through 37 seasons, the Bowling Green Falcons enjoyed an impressive 126–58–6 record at Doyt Perry Stadium. The stadium underwent a renovation in 1982 to expand its seating capacity from 23,272 to 30,599. The stadium and MAC attendance record was set in 1983 when 33,527 fans saw Toledo defeat Bowling Green 6–3 in the annual Battle of I-75. The Doyt hosted its first Big Ten opponent on September 6, 2008, as the Falcons were defeated by Minnesota 42–17. The Sebo Athletic Center opened in 2007 and is located at the north end of Doyt Perry Stadium. The 33,500 sq. ft. center was named after J. Robert and Karen Sebo who donated $4.4 million to the project. Sebo Athletic Center is home to sports medicine and rehabilitation centers, strength and training facilities, coaches offices, teaching space for coaches and players, video equipment and viewing room and team meeting rooms.

=== Stroh Center ===
The Bowling Green basketball teams and volleyball team moved into a new, state-of-the art convocation center in 2011, replacing the aging Anderson Arena. The new 5,000-seat facility is named the Stroh Center, after Kermit and Mary Lu Stroh who donated $7.7 million to the project. The Stroh Center is also home to the largest falcon statue in the world, a gift from North Carolina philanthropist Irwin Belk. The university broke ground on the Stroh Center on September 3, 2009, a few hours prior to the football team's season opener at nearby Doyt Perry Stadium.

=== Slater Family Ice Arena ===
Slater Family Ice Arena is home to Bowling Green's men's hockey team. Opened in 1967, the arena is located on the east end of campus across from the Student Recreation Center. The university had planned to renovate the arena in 2009, but has since postponed the upgrades due to the current economic situation. The arena was renamed in 2017.

=== Steller Field ===
Warren E. Steller Field was the home to the Falcons baseball team from 1964 to 2020. The field is named in honor of Warren E. Steller, a former instructor at the school who coached the school's football team from 1924 to 1934 and the baseball team in 1925 and again from 1928 to 1959. The stadium is located on the Bowling Green campus, next to Slater Family Ice Arena and across the street from Perry Field House.

=== Other facilities ===
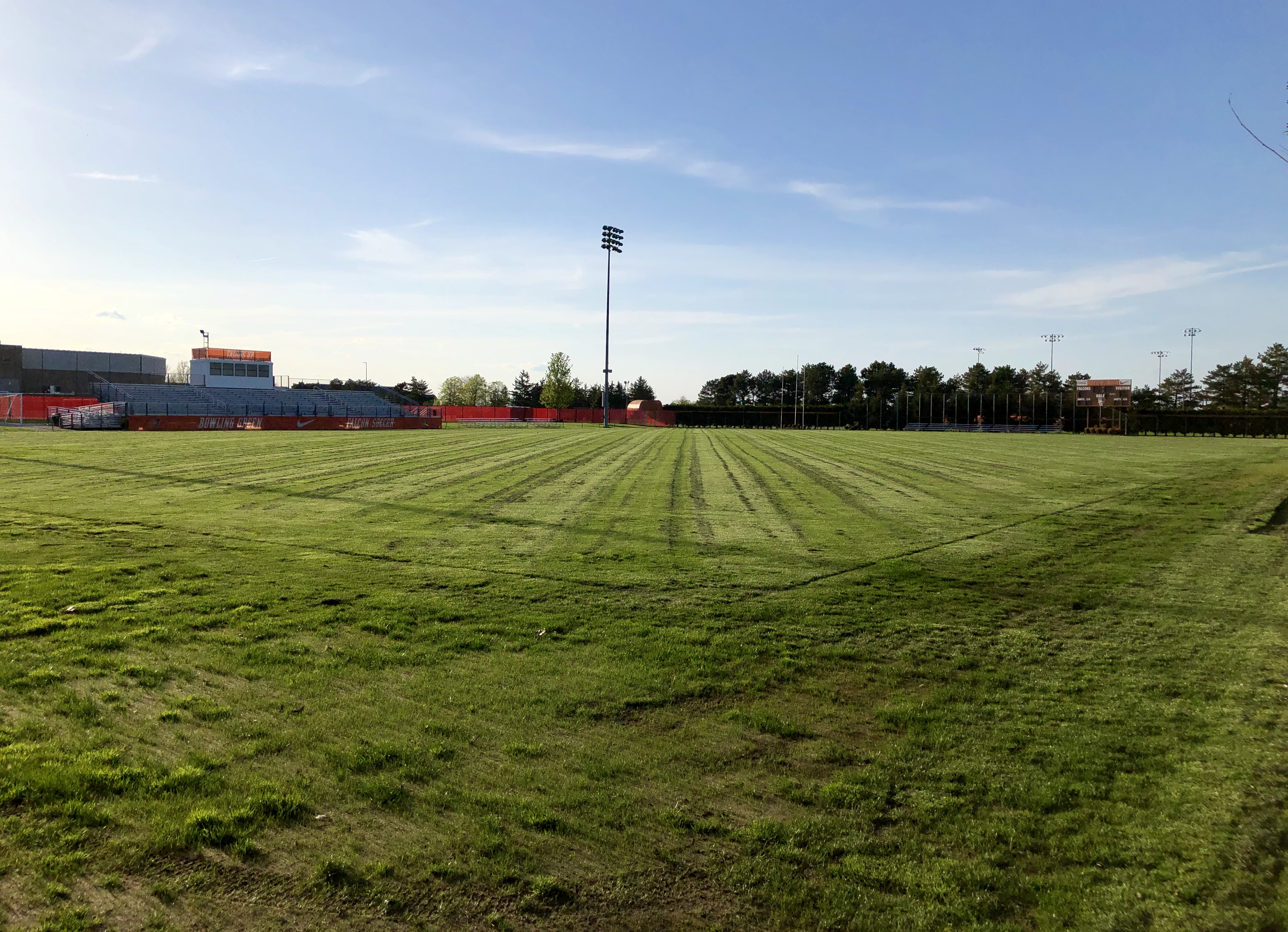
Mickey Cochrane Stadium

Mickey Cochrane Stadium is home to the Bowling Green's men's and women's soccer teams and is located behind the Slater Family Ice Arena. Opened in 1966, the stadium was renamed on October 11, 1980, in honor of Bowling Green's first men's soccer coach. The stadium was renovated in 1993 and 1994, which included the installation of a permanent grandstand that seats 1,500. Cochrane Stadium is also home to the United States Youth Soccer Association's Olympic Development Program Region II camps.

Cooper Pool is home to Bowling Green's women's swimming and diving team. Cooper Pool is located in the Student Recreation Center on the east end of campus.

Whittaker Track is home to Bowling Green's women's track and field team. Located northeast of Doyt Perry Stadium, Whittaker Track underwent a renovation in 2007 and was reopened in 2008 in time to host the MAC Outdoor Track and Field Championships.

College Park Rugby Field is home to the Bowling Green State University Rugby Football Club. Located on the northwest corner of campus at the corners of North College and Poe Road. It is one of the few dedicated collegiate rugby pitches in the United States. It has grandstand seating for 150, an electronic scoreboard, an onsite changing room and parking for 100 cars

== National championships ==
- Football: 1959 NCAA College Division National Championship
- Figure skating: USCFS Championship Alissa Czisny 2004, 2008
- Ice hockey: 1984 NCAA Division I Men's Ice Hockey Tournament
- Rugby: 2018 USA Rugby D1-AA National Championship
- Cheerleading: 2014 UCA National Championship, D1A Small Coed

== Notable athletes ==
Several notable athletes have played collegiately for Bowling Green, including Nate Thurmond, who played professional basketball in the National Basketball Association (NBA). Thurmond, whose number 42 is the only basketball number retired by the university, graduated in 1963 before eventually being named one of the 50 Greatest Players in NBA History. Bowling Green also was the collegiate home to one of the NBA's first ever draft picks, Chuck Share, who was selected by the Boston Celtics in the 1950 NBA Draft. Former NBA players Antonio Daniels and Keith McLeod also played at BGSU. Most recently, Richaun Holmes was drafted by the Philadelphia 76ers in the second round of the 2015 NBA draft.

BGSU's hockey team perhaps has provided the school with the greatest number of notable athletes. Two of its players were on the "Miracle on Ice" U.S. hockey team that captured the 1980 Winter Olympics gold medal: Ken Morrow and Mark Wells. Rob Blake also captured a gold medal for his country as Canada took up the top prize during the 2002 Winter Olympics. Two Falcons have also won the Hobey Baker Award, given to the top collegiate men's hockey player each season: George McPhee (1982) and Brian Holzinger (1995). In 1984 the Bowling Green Hockey Team won the National Championship in one of the longest games in college hockey history. Gino Cavallini scored at 7:11 in the 4th overtime to give the Falcons their first college hockey national championship. Also advancing to the NHL was retired Atlanta Thrashers defenseman Ken Klee.

Omar Jacobs was the starting quarterback for Bowling Green in 2004 and 2005. In 2004, he passed for 4,002 yards and set the NCAA record for TD to INT rate, at 41 touchdowns to 4 interceptions. He entered the 2005 season as a Heisman trophy candidate, but was unable to duplicate the success of 2004 and missed two starts due to injury.

Don Nehlen played and coached at BG. He played quarterback for BG during his playing days before coaching the Falcons for nine seasons from 1968 to 1976. Nehlen went on to coach West Virginia University where he would receive national attention. The coach joined the College Football Hall of Fame in 2005. Doyt Perry is another Hall of Fame coach who led the Falcons from 1955 through 1964. The university's football stadium is now named in his honor. More recently, Urban Meyer coached the Falcons for two seasons in 2001 and 2002 before leaving for the University of Utah. Meyer, whose last coaching job was with the NFL's Jacksonville Jaguars, has won three college championships—two at Florida in 2006 and 2008, and one at Ohio State in 2014.

Other notable football players include Phil Villapiano and Shaun Suisham. Villapiano was an integral part of the Oakland Raiders in their glory days during the 1970s as a 4-time Pro-Bowler. Suisham is the kicker for the Pittsburgh Steelers.

Dave Wottle was an NCAA champion and All-American at Bowling Green before graduating in 1973. He won the gold medal in the 800 meter run at the 1972 Summer Olympics.

Orel Hershiser pitched at Bowling Green before having a dominant career with the Los Angeles Dodgers.

== Club sports ==
Students at Bowling Green also have the opportunity to participating and compete in various sports at the club level. Club sports do not offer scholarships that varsity sports offer and are operated by the Department of Student Life.

- Baseball
- Bowling
- Curling
- Cycling
- Dodgeball
- Equestrian
- Gymnastics M/W
- Ice hockey
- Synchronized ice skating
- Lacrosse
- Rugby M/W
- Sailing
- Soccer M/W
- Softball
- Tennis M/W
- Track and field M/W
- Ultimate M/W
- Volleyball M/W
- Water polo
- Water skiing
- Wrestling

=== Rugby ===
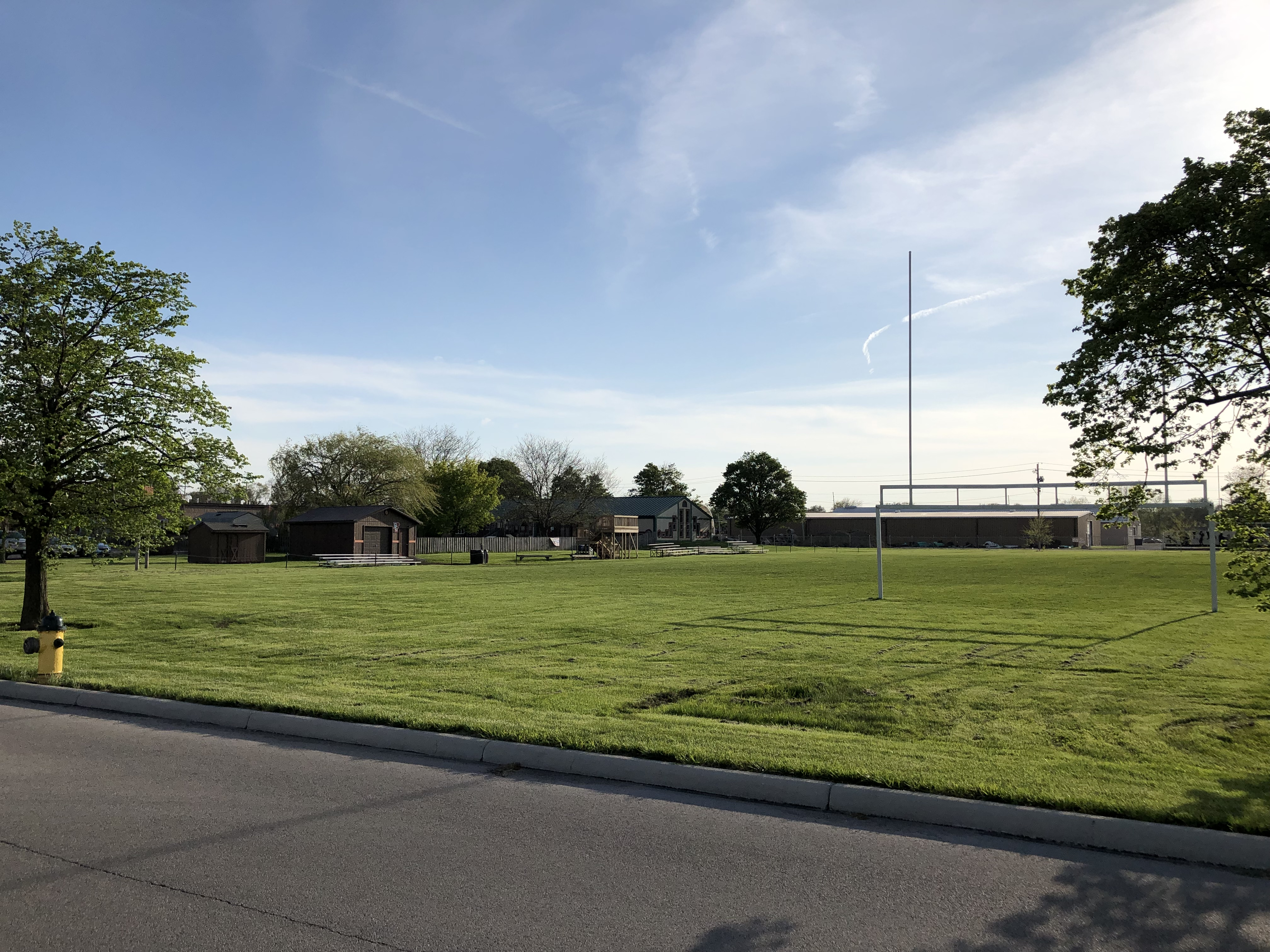
The BGSU Rugby Field.

The Bowling Green State University Rugby Football Club has been one of the more successful college rugby clubs in the United States. Established in 1968, the club has over 80 members and fields five teams. The club has been embraced by the university as a quasi-varsity sport, with a home game fan attendance that makes it the fourth most watched sport on campus. The club averages nine wins for every loss with an all-time record of 2672–420–88. BGSU RFC became the first Bowling Green athletic program (varsity or club) to compete outside of North America, touring England (1987, 1995, 2012, 2014), Wales (2000), South Africa (2002, 2007), and Ireland (2005). BGSU RFC plays their home matches on the Roger Mazzarella Rugby Field on the corner of North College Avenue and Poe Road with an occasional game at the BGSU football stadium.

Bowling Green Rugby has won 41 Mid-American Conference titles, eleven Ohio Collegiate titles, eleven Michigan Collegiate titles and has received over 20 National Collegiate Championship bids, competing in 4 National Championship matches (2016, 2018, 2021, 2024). Fourteen Falcons have received All-American honors including: Chuck Tunnacliffe (1986), Tony Konczak (1988), Wes Harmon (1991), Scott Hogg (2003), Derek Imes (2006), Ian Gangnon (2006), Rich Hines (2008), Nick Viviani (2008), Rocco Mauer (2010), Frank Viancourt (2015), Phil Bryant (2018), Ryan Strinmetz (2019), Philip Tracey (2023, 2024), and Joey Apple (2023,2024).

Three Falcons have seen call ups to United States national rugby union team by Tunnacliffe in 1991, Vince Staropoli in 1999 and Rocco Mauer in 2013.

Bowling Green finished ninth at the 2010 Collegiate Rugby Championship, a tournament broadcast live on NBC. Bowling Green's Rocco Mauer was the leading try scorer and the MVP of the tournament. Mauer signed a professional contract in 2012 to play full-time for the US national team. Bowling Green reached the 2014 D1-AA national playoffs, notching wins against Iowa State and Missouri, before losing to Arizona in the semifinals.

Bowling Green finished second at the 2016 USA Rugby Fall National Championship losing to Notre Dame College (Ohio) 39–17. Bowling Green's center Adam Regini and Scrumhalf Mitch Sora were named as a D1AA Fall Top 50 Backs. While Phil Bryant was not only named as a D1AA Fall Top 50 Forward, but also as the Fall 2016 MVP Forward.

Bowling Green won the Fall D1AA Rugby National Championship in 2018, beating Saint Joseph’s University 26–7. The win capped off the 50th anniversary season of BGSU Rugby.

== Pageantry ==
Before 1927, BG teams were called the Normals or Teachers. Ivan Lake (’23) suggested the nickname after reading an article on falconry. Lake, managing editor and sports editor of the Sentinel-Tribune in Bowling Green at the time, proposed the name change because it fit headline space and because falcons were "the most powerful bird for their size and often attacked birds two or three times their size." Bowling Green's athletic teams have been known as the "Falcons" ever since.

=== School colors ===
The historical story behind how BGSU began using brown and orange as its school colors dates back to 1914. Homer B. Williams, the university's first President, gathered a group of people which included a L.L. Winslow from Industrial Arts as a selection committee for the school's new colors. While on a trolley to Toledo, Dr. Winslow sat behind a woman wearing a large hat adorned with beautiful brown and orange feathers. Dr. Winslow was so interested in the color scheme of the pair that he convinced the committee to approve the combination of brown and orange.

=== School songs ===
Bowling Green State University has three common songs that can be heard being played by the Falcon Marching Band at various athletic and academic events. These three songs are the Alma Mater, "Forward Falcons" which is the school's fight song, and "Ay Ziggy Zoomba" which is played to hype up the crowd at events, which is more familiar to most students, alumni, and fans.

=== Mascots ===
Freddie and Frieda Falcon are the mascots for Falcons athletics. The pair are anthropomorphized peregrine falcons. They are somewhat of a rarity among collegiate mascots, being one of the few male-female mascot pairs in existence. In 2006 they were both named "Best Collegiate Mascot" at the 2006 NCA Cheer Camp in Nashville, Tennessee at Vanderbilt University. Freddie first appeared at Bowling Green sporting events in 1950. Frieda made her first appearance in 1966, but did not become an official mascot until 1980.

=== SICSIC ===
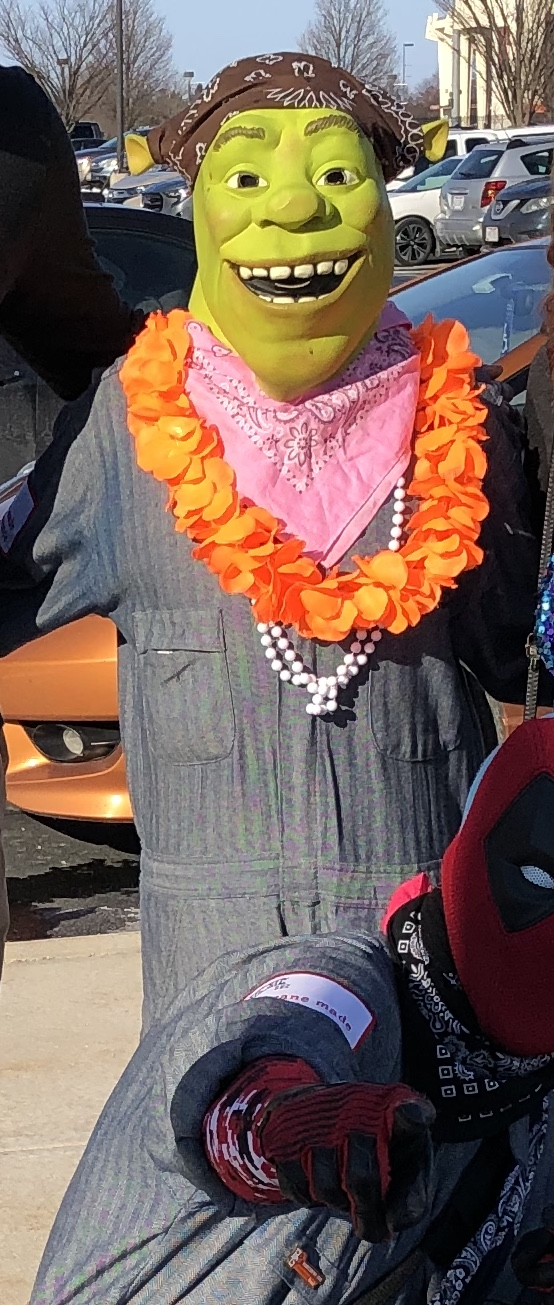
A member of SICSIC

SICSIC are a six-member, anonymous pep squad and the official spirit crew for BGSU, which began in 1946. SICSIC members adorn Halloween masks throughout their time with the organization and remain anonymous until the final home hockey game of the member's senior year, where they are unmasked in front of the student body.

=== BGSU Athletic Hall of Fame ===
Any former BG student-athlete out of school for at least 10 years, a coach, or a contributor to BGSU athletics is eligible for induction into the BGSU Athletic Hall of Fame. Athletes who leave school early are not eligible to be placed on the ballot until 10 years after what would have been their senior year. Portraits of each of the over nearly 200 inductees are on display in the lobby of the BGSU Stroh Center. BG's 1984 NCAA championship squad was inducted in 1993 as the first "team" ever named to the Hall of Fame.
