= Chessa Field =

Soccer field at Ohio University in the US

Coordinates: 39°19′34″N 82°06′42″W

- Home of the Bobcats
- Interactive map of Chessa Field
- Former names: Ohio Soccer Field
- Address: Athens, Ohio; United States
- Owner: Ohio University
- Operator: Ohio University Athletics
- Capacity: 1,000
- Type: Stadium
- Surface: Natural Grass
- Field size: 120 x 75 yd
- Current use: Soccer

Construction
- Groundbreaking: 1996
- Opened: September 6, 1997; 28 years ago
- Cost: $1 millionUSD

Tenants
- Ohio Bobcats (NCAA) women's soccer (2002–present)

Website
- ohiobobcats.com/chessa-field

Chessa Field is a soccer-specific stadium located on the campus of Ohio University in Athens, Ohio. It has served to the Ohio Bobcats women's soccer team since 2002.

== History ==
The stadium was opened under the name of "Ohio Soccer Field" on September 6, 1997. On that day, Ohio defeated Youngstown State 2–0 in what was also the first home varsity women's soccer match in the history of Ohio University.

In 2003, several renovations took place to the field thanks to a $60,000 donation from Ohio University groundskeeper Scott Blower and his wife Crista. This allowed a new grass playing surface to be installed at the field. Also, the field dimensions were expanded to the NCAA maximum, new bleachers with a capacity of 1,000 were added, a new press box were constructed, a new digital scoreboard was added to the facility, and wrought-iron fencing was erected to surround the field.

The stadium was named "Chessa Field" in honor of Scott and Crista Blower's daughter, Chessa Blower.
