= Western Michigan Broncos women's soccer =

American college soccer team

- Founded: 1996
- University: Western Michigan University
- Head coach: Lewis Robinson
- Location: Kalamazoo, Michigan, US
- Nickname: Broncos
- Colors: Brown and gold

NCAA tournament Round of 32
- 2003, 2013

NCAA tournament appearances
- 2003, 2013, 2015, 2024, 2025, 2026

Conference tournament championships
- 2003, 2013, 2015, 2024, 2025, 2026

Conference regular season championships
- 2023, 2024, 2025, 2026

The Western Michigan Broncos women's soccer team represents Western Michigan University in NCAA Division I college soccer. Western Michigan women's soccer competes in the Mid-American Conference (MAC).

== History ==
Since their inception in 1996, the Western Michigan women's soccer team has been MAC tournament champions in 2003, 2013, 2015, 2024, and 2025.

In 2003, the Broncos made their first NCAA tournament appearance and defeated Illinois 2–0 in the first round. They lost 3–2 to Purdue in the Round of 32.

In 2013, Western Michigan returned to the NCAA tournament after a ten year absence. In the first round, the Broncos defeated Marquette 1–0. In the round of 32, they lost to Notre Dame.

In 2015, the Broncos lost in the first round of the NCAA tournament 1–0 to Florida.

After a nine year absence, Western Michigan returned to the NCAA tournament in 2024. Western Michigan won the 2024 MAC championship 5–0 over Buffalo to receive the conference’s automatic tournament bid. The Broncos would lose in the first round to Michigan State 3–1.

In 2025, after winning the MAC tournament 1–0 versus Bowling Green, the Broncos lost 3–2 in the first round of the 2025 NCAA Tournament against Wisconsin.

== Current squad ==
As of November 2026

Note: Flags indicate national team as defined under FIFA eligibility rules; some limited exceptions apply. Players may hold more than one non-FIFA nationality.

No.	Pos.	Nation	Player
0	GK	USA	Emily Kruntovski
00	GK	USA	Kate Sheridan
1	GK	USA	Reagan Sulaver
2	MF	USA	Olivia Anderson
3	FW	USA	RJ Wagamon
4	DF	USA	Kailah Newcomb
5	MF	USA	Chloe Lawson
6	FW	USA	Kiya Gilliand
7	MF	USA	Sydney Dulak
8	FW	USA	Charlotte Stavis
9	FW	USA	Irelyn Sheldon
10	MF	USA	Sophia Bowman
11	MF	USA	Gracie Lynn
12	MF	USA	Reese Lynn
13	FW	CAN	Mikayla Coore-Pascal

No.	Pos.	Nation	Player
14	DF	USA	Olivia Smith
15	DF	USA	Peyton Duffing
17	DF	CAN	Arianna Rose
18	DF	USA	Taryn DeShane
19	DF	USA	Sydnee Maxwell
20	MF	USA	Meredith Vance
21	DF	USA	Izelee Kerns
22	MF	USA	Simone Sharpless
23	FW	USA	Tessa Fagerson
24	MF	USA	June Mullen
26	FW	USA	Kaiya Stewart
27	FW	CAN	Brianna Langelaan
30	MF	USA	Camryn Huhn
32	DF	USA	Sammi Glover

== Year-by-year results ==
Year	Head coach	Overall Record	Conference Record	Conference Finish	NCAA Tournament Results
Kate O'Shaughnessy (1996–1997)
1996	Kate O'Shaughnessy	11–7–1			
1997	Kate O'Shaughnessy	9–8–2	4–2–1	2nd (tie)	
Kate O'Shaughnessy:		20–15–3	4–2–1		
Mike Haines (1998–2008)
1998	Mike Haines	6–10–2	3–6–1	8th	
1999	Mike Haines	10–9–1	5–5–1	6th	
2000	Mike Haines	10–9–2	5–4–2	6th	
2001	Mike Haines	8–11–0	6–6–0	7th	
2002	Mike Haines	7–10–1	5–5–1	7th	
2003	Mike Haines	14–8–1	8–4–0	3rd	NCAA Second Round
2004	Mike Haines	11–6–4	6–3–3	3rd (tie)	
2005	Mike Haines	10–8–1	8–3–0	3rd	
2006	Mike Haines	3–15–1	2–9–0	12th	
2007	Mike Haines	3–11–3	2–7–2	12th	
2008	Mike Haines	7–11–2	6–4–1	5th	
Mike Haines:		89–108–18	56–56–11		
Suzie Grech (2009–2011)
2009	Suzie Grech	6–8–5	3–4–3	8th	
2010	Suzie Grech	10–7–5	5–2–4	5th	
2011	Suzie Grech	14–8–0	8–3–0	4th	
Suzie Grech:		30–23–10	16–9–7		
Nate Norman (2012–2015)
2012	Nate Norman	5–10–4	1–5–4	11th	
2013	Nate Norman	12–6–5	7–2–2	4th	NCAA Second Round
2014	Nate Norman	12–7–1	5–5–1	3rd	
2015	Nate Norman	16–4–4	8–1–2	2nd	NCAA First Round
Nate Norman:		45–17–14	21–13–9		
Lauren Sinacola (2016–2017)
2016	Lauren Sinacola	13–7–1	7–5–1	4th	
2017	Lauren Sinacola	10–8–1	5–5–1	3rd	
Lauren Sinacola:		23–15–2	12–10–2		
Sarah Stanczyk (2018–2018)
2018	Sarah Stanczyk	14–7–0	7–4–0	3rd	
Sarah Stanczyk:		14–7–0	7–4–0		
Sammy Boateng (2019–2021)
2019	Sammy Boateng	8–10–1	6–4–1	3rd	
2020	Sammy Boateng	6–2–2	6–2–2	4th	
2021	Sammy Boateng	6–12–0	4–7–0	9th	
Sammy Boateng:		20–24–3	16–13–3		
Lewis Robinson (2022–Present)
2022	Lewis Robinson	5–9–5	5–4–2	6th	
2023	Lewis Robinson	12–4–3	8–0–3	1st	
2024	Lewis Robinson	13–2–6	8–0–3	1st	NCAA First Round
2025	Lewis Robinson	16–4–1	10–1–1	1st	NCAA First Round
2026	Lewis Robinson	12–4–4	8–2–1	1st	
Lewis Robinson:		58–23–19	39–7–10		
Total:		259–203–60			
National champion Postseason invitational champion Conference regular season champion Conference regular season and conference tournament champion Division regular season champion Division regular season and conference tournament champion Conference tournament champion
