= Northern Illinois Huskies women's soccer =

American college soccer team

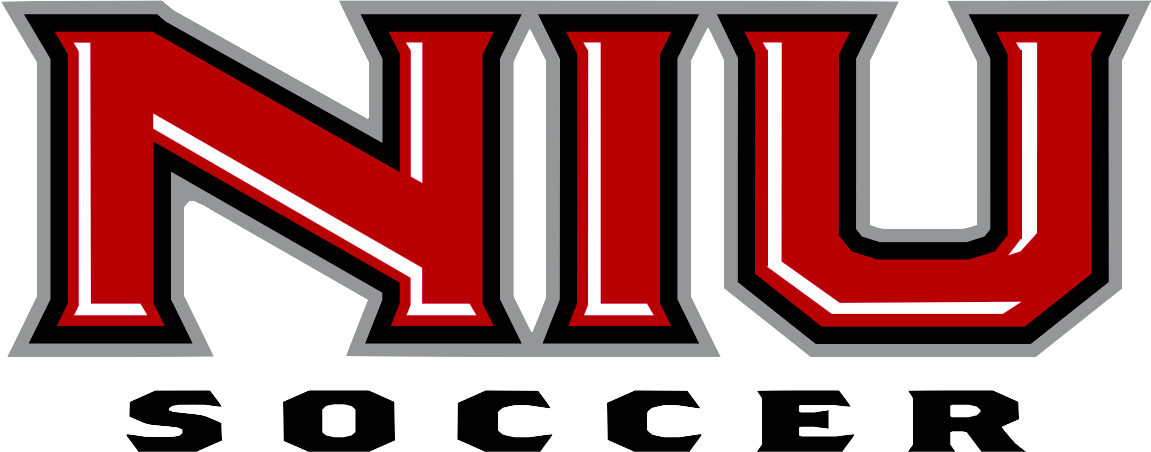
- Founded: 1993
- University: Northern Illinois University
- Head coach: Michael O’Neill (2nd season)
- Conference: MAC
- Location: DeKalb, Illinois, US
- Stadium: NIU Soccer Complex (capacity: 1,500)
- Nickname: Huskies
- Colors: Cardinal and black
Home	Away

Conference tournament championships
- 1997, 1998

Conference regular season championships
- 1997, 1998

The Northern Illinois Huskies women's soccer team is the college soccer team that represents Northern Illinois University (NIU) in DeKalb, Illinois, United States.

== History ==
The school's team currently competes in the Mid-American Conference (MAC). NIU women's soccer started playing in 1993 and are coached by Michael O'Neill.

== Current squad ==
As of November 2026

Note: Flags indicate national team as defined under FIFA eligibility rules; some limited exceptions apply. Players may hold more than one non-FIFA nationality.

No.	Pos.	Nation	Player
0	GK	USA	Alexandra Devory
00	GK	USA	Morgan Lucich
1	GK	USA	Lauren Pearson
2	FW	CAN	Mya Newcombe
3	DF	USA	Mckayla Harsley
4	DF	USA	Genevieve Wilson
6	DF	USA	Peyton Cornejo
7	FW	USA	Taite DeLange
8	DF	USA	Brianna Gutierrez
9	DF	USA	Angelina Briggs
10	FW	USA	Monica Correa
11	MF	USA	Abby Foulk
12	MF	CAN	Abbey Kijewski
13	MF	CAN	Zoe Mclauchlan

No.	Pos.	Nation	Player
14	DF	USA	Lyndsey Miller
15	DF	USA	Elle Wainscott
17	FW	CAN	Laurina Bilombo-Bemba
18	MF	USA	Maddy Sheppard
19	DF	USA	Rowan Moore
21	MF	USA	Lauren Mrugala
22	DF	USA	Jordin Kadiri
23	FW	USA	Julianna Hill
24	MF	USA	Isabel Struble
25	FW	USA	Dahlia Rodriguez
28	DF	USA	Lola Zarate
30	MF	CAN	Mckenna Campbell-Turkalj
32	MF	CAN	Sarah Roy

== Achievements ==
- Mid-American Conference Tournament:
  - Winners (2): 1997, 1998
  - Runners-up (2): 2006, 2016
  - Semifinals (2): 2007, 2014
  - Quarterfinals (5): 1999, 2008, 2010, 2012, 2013
- Mid-American Conference Regular Season:
  - Winners (2): 1997, 1998

== Honors ==
=== All-Americans ===
NIU women's soccer has had one player named to the Soccer Buzz All-America team.

Year	Player	Position	Team
1998	(United States) Anne Mucci	Forward	Honorable Mention

=== Academic All-Americans ===
NIU women's soccer has had a combined 3 players named to CoSIDA and NSCAA Academic All-America teams, including one First-Team Academic All-American.

Year	Player	Position	Organization	Team
1998	(United States) Anne Mucci	Forward	CoSIDA	First-Team
1998	(United States) Anne Mucci	Forward	NSCAA	Second-Team
2001	(United States) Megan Anderson	Forward	CoSIDA	Third-Team

=== Players of the Year ===
NIU women's soccer has had two players named Player of the Year by the conference.

Year	Player	Conference
1997	(United States) Allison Wade	MAC
1998	(United States) Anne Mucci	MAC

=== Coaches of the Year ===
NIU women's soccer has had two head coaches named Coach of the Year by the conference.

Year	Head Coach	Conference
1997	(United States) Frank Horvat	MAC
1998	(United States) Frank Horvat	MAC

== See also ==
- NIU Huskies men's soccer
- Mid-American Conference Women's Soccer Tournament
- NCAA Division I Women's Soccer Championship
