= Kent State Golden Flashes women's soccer =

American college soccer team

- Founded: 1997; 29 years ago
- University: Kent State University
- Head coach: Rob Marinaro
- Location: Kent, Ohio, US
- Stadium: Dix Stadium
- Nickname: Golden Flashes
- Colors: Navy blue and gold
Home	Away

NCAA tournament appearances
- 2016

Conference tournament championships
- 2016

Conference regular season championships
- 2003, 2004, 2017

The Kent State Golden Flashes women's soccer team represents the Kent State University in NCAA Division I college soccer. Kent State women's soccer competes in the Mid-American Conference. The Golden Flashes are led by head coach Rob Marinaro.

== History ==
Kent State women's soccer began play in 1997 and finished 3-14-2 in its inaugural season.

Coached by head coach Rob Marinaro since the 2001 season, the Golden Flashes have been MAC regular season champions in 2003, 2004, and 2017.

The Golden Flashes won their first MAC tournament title in 2016 and made their first trip to the NCAA tournament. Kristen Brots scored an 86th minute goal to deliver a 1-0 win over Northern Illinois to win the 2016 MAC championship.

The 2016 team holds the program wins record with a team record 15 wins and 15-3-2 record.
