= Ball State Cardinals women's soccer =

College soccer team

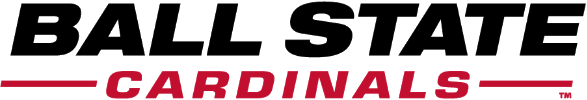
- University: Ball State University
- Founded: 1999
- Head coach: Andy Stoots
- Location: Muncie, Indiana
- Arena: Briner Sports Complex
- Conference: Mid-American
- Nickname: Cardinals
- Colors: Cardinal and white

Conference regular-season champions
- 2006, 2007, 2015, 2016

The Ball State Cardinals women's soccer team represents Ball State University in women's soccer. The school competes in the Mid-American Conference in Division I of the National Collegiate Athletic Association (NCAA). The Cardinals are coached by Andy Stoots.

== History ==
The Ball State women's soccer program was founded in 1999 and has achieved a 267–185–72 record through the 2025 season.

The Cardinals finished the team's inaugural 1999 season with a 1–17–1 record. The 2001 season was the first time Ball State posted 10+ wins in a season, finishing with a 12–6–2 record.

In 2006, the program won its first-ever MAC regular season championship.

In 2006, 2007, 2015, and 2016, Ball State was MAC regular season champions. However, the team has not won the MAC tournament title or made the NCAA tournament.
