= Bowling Green Falcons women's soccer =

American college soccer team

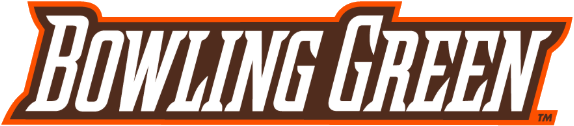
- Founded: 1997
- University: Bowling Green University
- Head coach: Chris Fox
- Location: Bowling Green, Ohio, US
- Nickname: Falcons
- Colors: Brown and orange

NCAA tournament appearances
- 2004, 2005, 2018, 2019, 2020, 2021

Conference tournament championships
- 2004, 2005, 2018, 2019, 2020, 2021

The Bowling Green Falcons women's soccer team represents Bowling Green University in NCAA Division I college soccer. Bowling Green women's soccer competes in the Mid-American Conference (MAC). The Falcons are led by head coach Chris Fox.

== History ==
The Bowling Green women's soccer program became a varsity sport in 1997. They have 6 MAC tournament titles and NCAA tournament appearances in 2004, 2005, 2018, 2019, 2020, and 2021.

In 2004, Bowling Green made their first NCAA tournament appearance, losing in the first round to Ohio State 2-0. In 2005, the Falcons won back to back MAC titles and made a second consecutive NCAA tournament appearance, losing in round 1 to Michigan State.

From 2018 to 2021, the Falcons enjoyed a dynasty in the MAC, winning four consecutive MAC tournament championships.

In 2018, Bowling Green lost in the first round of the NCAA tournament to Penn State.

In the 2019 NCAA tournament, the Falcons fell in round 1 to Michigan 2-1.

The 2020 NCAA tournament saw Bowling Green nearly win their first NCAA tournament game but they fell to Ole Miss in a penalty shootout.

In the 2021 NCAA tournament, Bowling Green rematched with Michigan and lost 3-0 in the first round.
