= Central Michigan Chippewas =

Athletic teams for Central Michigan University

- University: Central Michigan University
- Conference: Mid-American
- NCAA: Division I (FBS)
- Athletic director: Amy Folan
- Location: Mount Pleasant, Michigan
- Varsity teams: 17
- Football stadium: Kelly/Shorts Stadium
- Basketball arena: McGuirk Arena
- Baseball stadium: Bill Theunissen Stadium
- Other venues: Jack Skoog Indoor Track
- Mascot: Chippewas/Flying C
- Nickname: Chippewas
- Fight song: CMU Fight Song
- Colors: Maroon and gold
- Website: cmuchippewas.com
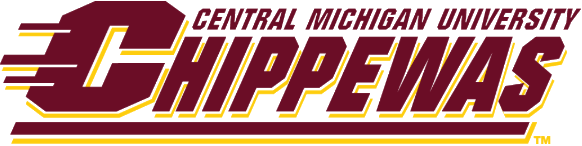

The Central Michigan Chippewas are the intercollegiate athletic teams that represent Central Michigan University (CMU), located in Mount Pleasant, Michigan. The school fields sixteen men's and women's intercollegiate teams that compete at the National Collegiate Athletic Association (NCAA) Division I level.

CMU was a member of the Illinois Intercollegiate Athletic Conference from 1950 to 1970. The school's athletics programs are affiliated with the NCAA and compete in the Mid-American Conference (MAC). The women's lacrosse team formerly competed in the Southern Conference, until the MAC began sponsoring that sport in 2020. The school colors are maroon and gold, and the school, and its students and alumni are referred to as Chippewas which is sometimes shortened to Chips.

The nickname is used with the consent of the nearby Saginaw Chippewa Indian Tribe. The university was placed on the NCAA's list of schools with "hostile or abusive" nicknames in August 2005, but appealed the decision, with the support of the Saginaw Chippewa Tribal Nation. On September 2, 2005, the university announced that their appeal of the decision had been upheld.

== History ==
The school athletics logo has changed over time, once featuring an Indian spear, but is now a stylized block letter "C". Within the university, this logo is often referred to as the "Action C" or "Flying C". The current version of the athletic trademark was first used in 1997.

=== Nickname ===
Central Michigan is a member of the Mid-American Conference

The Chippewas nickname was put forth by assistant football coach Lawrence "Doc" Sweeney in 1942 to replace the then-current Bearcats. He argued that Bearcats not only had nothing to do with the school and the area but was also a nearly extinct beast that none of the students had ever seen or heard of. He further argued that not only was Chippewa the name of the school's yearbook, but the Chippewa River flows through Mount Pleasant, and the "American Indian image" would provide "... unlimited opportunities for pageantry and showmanship for the band as well as athletic teams." The new name was passed by a vote of the student body.

When negative reaction to racial stereotypes grew in the 1970s and 1980s, it was recommended by the Michigan Civil Rights Commission that the Chippewas name be dropped. Instead, in 1989 the university instituted several measures to enhance the name, including introducing special educational programs developed in conjunction with the Saginaw Chippewa Tribal Council, headquartered on the local Isabella Indian Reservation; orientation programs were set up to familiarize CMU students and staff with traditional American Indian culture; the school's American Indian logos were eliminated along with tom-tom drumbeats by the pep bands and other activities that would reflect racial stereotypes.

== Varsity sports ==
A member of the West Division of the Mid-American Conference (MAC), Central Michigan sponsors teams in six men's and eleven women's NCAA sanctioned sports.

Men's sports	Women's sports
Baseball	Basketball
Basketball	Cross country
Cross country	Field hockey
Football	Golf
Golf	Gymnastics
Wrestling	Lacrosse
	Soccer
	Softball
	Track and field^{†}
	Volleyball
† – Track and field includes both indoor and outdoor.

=== Baseball ===
Central's baseball team was NCAA Division II runner-up in 1971, having lost to Florida Southern College 4–0 in the championship game.

=== Men's basketball ===
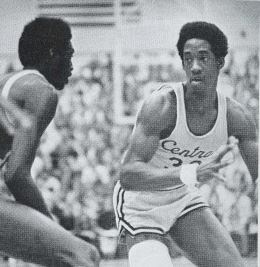
Central Michigan game in 1974–75 season

Coach Davis was introduced by Central Michigan University as the Chippewas' 20th head men's basketball coach on April 3, 2012. In his inaugural season, he led a team of 8 new student-athletes to 11 wins. The seven non-conference victories match the 2002–2003 team's mark, and the most wins in the last 25 years. Four freshmen started for Coach Davis during the final 10 games of the season.

Under Coach Davis, Chris Fowler set the program record for a freshman with 167 assists, which ranks fourth all-time in single season history, securing him a spot on the All-MAC Freshman team. Fellow guard Kyle Randall led the MAC in scoring in 2013, averaging 18.7 points per game against conference opponents, en route to earning Second Team All-MAC and NABC All-District recognition.

=== Football ===
The football team won the second NCAA Division II national championship in 1974 by defeating the University of Delaware 54–14. The team was voted national champion in the Associated Press College Division poll. The Chips have also been national runner-up twice.

In 2006, they won the MAC Championship in against Ohio and then defeated Middle Tennessee State in the Motor City Bowl. In 2007, the team defended their MAC Championship title in the game against Miami University, but lost to Purdue in the Motor City Bowl. The team was also beaten by Florida Atlantic in the 2008 Motor City Bowl.

=== Men's golf ===
Men's golf returned to Central Michigan in 2022, after a 37-year absence. After eliminating the men's indoor and outdoor track and field teams in 2020, in response to budget issues caused by the COVID-19 pandemic, CMU fell below six men's sports sponsored, the minimum required by the NCAA for a Division I institution. The NCAA granted Central Michigan a two-year waiver to correct its non-compliance with the rule. CMU claims to save approximately $600,000 per year by not sponsoring men's track and field and expects the men's golf program to cost less than half of that.

=== Softball ===
The Chippewa softball team has appeared in two Women's College World Series in 1982 and 1987.

=== Men's swimming and diving ===
In 1958 the men's swimming and diving team was runner-up to North Central College at the second annual NAIA national meet, which was held in Muncie, Ind.

=== Wrestling ===
Chippewa Matmen have been at CMU dating back to 1955. Central Michigan Chippewa wrestling team is led by head coach Tom Borrelli are among the best in the nation each year competing in the NCAA Division I. Currently in his 22nd season with CMU wrestling, Borrelli has accomplished: 13 Mid-American Conference titles, seven top-15 national finishes in the last nine years, led the first program in MAC history to qualify all 10 wrestlers for the NCAA Championships, and named 2008 National Coach of the Year by two publications. Chippewa Wrestling has produced 2 Academic All-Americans in Mark DiSalvo (2006) & Wynn Michalak (2008), 53 NCAA All-Americans, and 2 individual NCAA Champions: Casey Cunningham (157) 1999, and John Rollins (137) 1959 & 1961 with 11 top-20 team finishes at the NCAA Wrestling Championships.

The wrestling practice facility, located at the CMU Events Center, opened during the 2010–11 season. The practice room includes three full-size mats, as well as an area adjacent to the mats for fitness equipment. The facility is located just steps from the competition floor at McGuirk Arena, providing an ideal warm-up area for the Chippewas during home dual meets.

Former Chippewa Wrestlers Phil Baroni and three-time All-American Jarod Trice are current Mixed Martial Artists. Baroni has competed in the UFC, Pride Fighting Championship, Bellator fighter. Trice is a currently an undefeated Bellator fighter.

== Club sports ==
CMU currently supports the following club sports teams,

- Archery
- Baseball
- Men's basketball
- Bass pro fishing
- Women's basketball
- Cycling
- Dodgeball
- Equestrian
- Fencing
- Golf
- Grappling
- Hip hop
- Men's hockey
- Women's hockey
- Judo
- Karate
- Cricket
- Men's lacrosse
- Paintball
- Competitive pom
- Racquetball
- Roller hockey
- Rowing
- Men's Rugby
- Women's rugby
- Club running at CMU
- Ski and snowboard
- Men's soccer
- Women's soccer
- Softball
- Co-ed swimming
- Synchronized skating
- Table tennis
- Taekwondo
- Tennis
- Triathlon
- Men's ultimate Frisbee
- Women's ultimate Frisbee
- Men's volleyball
- Women's volleyball
- Water polo
- Weightlifting

Women's lacrosse had been a club sport through the 2015 season, but became a full varsity sport in the 2016 season, playing in the ASUN Conference. The team moved to the Southern Conference when that league added women's lacrosse for the 2018 season.

=== Roller hockey ===
The roller hockey team was national runner-up in 2009 in the National Collegiate Roller Hockey Association (NCRHA) Division II tournament.

=== Men's rugby ===
The Central Michigan Rugby was initially established in November 1975. Founded as a Central Michigan University entity, a funding disagreement between the Club and University administration resulted in the club membership voting to become independent of the university, responsible for attaining their own autonomous funding sources, and become the Mount Pleasant Rugby Football Club on April 17, 1976. The team took on the name "EXILES" because of their new-found status even though three quarters of the roster was Central Michigan undergrad- and graduate students. The team played both city and university teams across Michigan and southern Ontario as well as "representing Central" as participants in the MAC tournaments at Bowling Green and Athens, Ohio in 1977 and 1978 as well as the Stroh's Great Lakes, Windsor Borderer's, and Traverse Cherry Pit tournaments.

The Club returned to a "club status sport" at the university in 1980 after sponsorship and funding rules were relaxed by the university. From Fall 1977 to the late 1990s, the Exiles were a division 1 team in the MAC. Early 2000, were then moved to DIV 2 and played instate schools such as Grand Valley, Ferris State, and Western Michigan as a Club sport again for the university. The Rugby Club did make 2 Midwest Div 2 playoff appearances in 2008, and in 2011. In 2011 they made it to the Elite 8 round for the first time in team history by Defeating Xavier Rugby, but then falling to Northern Illinois. In that same year, In the Spring of 2011, The MAC Rugby Conference was reformed and Central announced they were to join the Conference along with school and state rivals Western Michigan, and are currently still in the Conference today.
