= 2017 NCAA Division I women's soccer season =

NCAA Division I women's soccer
- Season: 2017
- Champions: Stanford (2nd Title)

The 2017 NCAA Division I women's soccer season was the 36th season of NCAA women's college soccer. The USC Trojans were the defending national champions.

== Preseason ==
=== Coaching changes ===
Program	Outgoing coach	Manner of departure	Date of vacancy	Incoming coach	Date of appointment
Alabama A&M	Frank Davies	Not announced	Not announced	Emanuel Stephens	Not announced
Albany	Caitlin Cucchiella	Retired	December 13, 2016	Nick Bochette	March 10, 2017
Alcorn State	Samuel Nwaneri	Not announced	Not announced	Junior Noel	May 3, 2017
Arizona State	Kevin Boyd	Resigned/to Legends FC	November 7, 2016	Graham Winkworth	November 29, 2016
Arkansas–Pine Bluff	Jamie Hutchison	to Washburn	February 3, 2017	Marcus Hoover	Not announced
Bowling Green	Lindsay Basalyga	Contract not renewed	November 9, 2016	Matt Fannon	December 26, 2016
Campbell	Stuart Horne	Not announced	Not announced	Samar Azem	July 2017
Chicago State	Tony Tommasi	Contract not renewed	October 31, 2016	Kevin Meek	February 24, 2017
Cleveland State	Sonia Curvelo	Resigned	November 10, 2016	Dallas Boyer	December 7, 2016
Cornell	Patrick Farmer	Not announced	Not announced	Dwight Hornibrook	February 23, 2017
Davidson	Greg Ashton	Not announced	2016	Adam Denton	December 20, 2016
Dayton	Mike Tucker	Retired	After 2016 season	Eric Golz	December 20, 2016
Delaware	Scott Grzenda	Resigned	November 11, 2016	Mike Barroqueiro	January 18, 2017
FIU	Thomas Chestnutt	Not announced	2016	Sharolta Nonen	January 17, 2017
Grambling State	Totty O. Totty	Released	After 2016 season	Justin Wagar	May 30, 2017
Gonzaga	Amy Edwards	Contract not renewed	November 9, 2016	Chris Watkins	December 12, 2016
Houston	Chris Pfau	Resigned	November 15, 2016	Diego Bocanegra	December 5, 2016
Illinois State	Eric Golz	To Dayton	December 20, 2016	Brad Silvey	December 20, 2016
Kentucky	Jon Lipsitz	Fired	November 4, 2016	Ian Carry	November 22, 2016
Liberty	Nate Norman	Resigned	January 16, 2017	Lang Wedemeyer	January 31, 2017
LIU Brooklyn	Scott McClellan	Not announced	Not announced	Eleri Earnshaw	March 10, 2017
Marist	Kate Lyn	Resigned	April 6, 2017	Gene Smith	June 28, 2017
Mississippi State	Aaron Gordon	Resigned	November 3, 2016	Tom Anagnost	December 8, 2016
North Dakota	Matt Kellogg	Contract not renewed	November 7, 2016	Chris Logan	December 14, 2016
Northern Iowa	Chris Logan	Resigned/to North Dakota	December 14, 2016	Bruce Erickson	February 10, 2017
Oakland	Margaret Saurin	Resigned	January 27, 2017	Juan Pablo Favero	March 6, 2017
Omaha	Don Klosterman	Contract not renewed	November 4, 2016	Tim Walters	December 19, 2016
Portland State	Laura Schott	Resigned	May 22, 2017	Katie Burton	June 23, 2017
Rhode Island	Michael Needham	Resigned/to Ohio State	February 7, 2017	Megan Jessee	April 4, 2017
San Diego	Ada Greenwood	Released	November 15, 2016	Louise Lieberman	December 30, 2016
South Alabama	Graham Winkworth	To Arizona State	November 29, 2016	Richard Moodie	December 16, 2016
South Dakota State	Lang Wedemeyer	To Liberty	January 31, 2017	Brock Thompson	January 31, 2017
Southeastern Louisiana	Matt Muia	Not announced	Not announced	Christopher McBride	November 28, 2016
Southern Utah	Becky Hogan	Fired	October 31, 2016	Fred Thompson	December 9, 2016
Texas A&M–Corpus Christi	Shanna Caldwell	Relieved of Duties	November 8, 2016	Craig Shaw	December 13, 2016
Troy	Jason Hamilton	To Mississippi State	December 20, 2016	Ged O'Connor	January 30, 2017
UAB	Harold Warren	Not announced	2017	Erica Demers	May 22, 2017
UMass Lowell	Joel Bancroft	Resigned	December 2, 2016	Francesco D'Agostino	February 3, 2017
Utah Valley	Brent Anderson	Resigned/to BYU	January 13, 2017	Chris Lemay	February 21, 2017
Villanova	Fran Kulas	Not announced	Not announced	Chris McLain	December 16, 2016
Wagner	Mike Minielli	Resigned	November 29, 2016	Phil Cassela	January 4, 2017
Xavier	Woody Sherwood	Resigned	October 31, 2016	Kacey White	December 14, 2016
Xavier	Kacey White	Resigned/to US Soccer	April 18, 2017	Nate Lie	May 14, 2017

=== Conference realignment ===
Three schools joined new conferences this season. Two moved their entire athletic programs to new conferences, and a third began play in its current all-sports league.

- Valparaiso moved from the Horizon League to the Missouri Valley Conference. The Crusaders replaced Wichita State, which does not sponsor either men's or women's soccer, after that school left the MVC for the American Athletic Conference.
- The Horizon League replaced Valparaiso by recruiting IUPUI from the Summit League.
- Kansas State, a full Big 12 Conference member that started its women's soccer program in 2016 and played that season as an independent, began playing a full Big 12 schedule.

While no Division I schools added women's soccer programs for 2017, two NCAA Division II members that sponsor women's soccer announced during the 2016–17 offseason that they would upgrade their athletic programs to Division I effective in 2018.

- North Alabama, currently in the Gulf South Conference, will join the Atlantic Sun Conference.
- California Baptist will leave the Pacific West Conference for the Western Athletic Conference.

The 2017 season is the last for one Division I school in its current conference:

- North Dakota will leave the Big Sky Conference, its home since 2012, to join the Summit League in 2018.

== Season Overview ==
=== Polls ===
==== Pre-season polls ====
United Soccer Coaches
Rank	Team
1	West Virginia
2	Stanford
3	USC
4	South Carolina
5	Georgetown
6	North Carolina
7	Florida
8	BYU
9	UCLA
10	Auburn
11	Virginia
12	Duke
13	Clemson
14	Connecticut
15	Florida State
16	Oklahoma
17	Arkansas
18	Notre Dame
19	Minnesota
20	Utah
21	Rutgers
22	Nebraska
23	Northwestern
24	Santa Clara
25	Colorado

Top Drawer Soccer
Rank	Team
1	Penn State
2	Stanford
3	West Virginia
4	Florida State
5	Duke
6	UCLA
7	California
8	USC
9	North Carolina
10	Georgetown
11	Santa Clara
12	South Carolina
13	Utah
14	Notre Dame
15	Florida
16	Colorado
17	Northwestern
18	Arkansas
19	Virginia
20	BYU
21	Clemson
22	Texas A&M
23	NC State
24	Long Beach State
25	Auburn

Soccer America
Rank	Team
1	Stanford
2	West Virginia
3	Penn State
4	UCLA
5	Florida State
6	Georgetown
7	South Carolina
8	USC
9	Florida
10	North Carolina
11	Santa Clara
12	BYU
13	Duke
14	Virginia
15	California
16	Notre Dame
17	Utah
18	Clemson
19	Colorado
20	Northwestern
21	Texas A&M
22	Rutgers
23	Kansas
24	Memphis
25	Auburn

Hero Sports
Rank	Team
1	USC
2	Stanford
3	West Virginia
4	North Carolina
5	UCLA
6	BYU
7	Virginia
8	South Carolina
9	Florida
10	Utah
11	Auburn
12	Duke
13	Georgetown
14	California
15	Clemson
16	Santa Clara
17	Minnesota
18	Colorado
19	Florida State
20	Notre Dame
21	Arkansas
22	Oklahoma
23	Penn State
24	Washington State
25	Pepperdine

==== Final polls ====
United Soccer Coaches
Rank	Team
1	Stanford
2	UCLA
3	Duke
4	South Carolina
5	Penn State
6	Florida
7	Princeton
8	North Carolina
9	Virginia
10	West Virginia
11	Baylor
12	Texas A&M
13	USC
14	Texas
15	Florida State
16	Pepperdine
17	UCF
18	Notre Dame
19	Washington State
20	Santa Clara
21	NC State
22	Rutgers
23	Ohio State
24	Georgetown
25	Tennessee

Soccer America
Rank	Team
1	Stanford
2	North Carolina
3	Duke
4	UCLA
5	South Carolina
6	USC
7	Texas A&M
8	Georgetown
9	Penn State
10	Princeton
11	UCF
12	Pepperdine
13	West Virginia
14	Oklahoma State
15	Virginia
16	Ohio State
17	Wisconsin
18	Florida
19	Texas
20	Cal
21	Rutgers
22	Butler
23	NC State
23	Wake Forest
24	Florida State
25	Clemson

Top Drawer Soccer
Rank	Team
1	Stanford
2	UCLA
3	Duke
4	South Carolina
5	Princeton
6	Penn State
7	Florida
8	Baylor
9	Virginia
10	West Virginia
11	North Carolina
12	Texas A&M
13	Pepperdine
14	USC
15	Georgetown
16	NC State
17	Oklahoma State
18	UCF
19	Wake Forest
20	Texas
21	Tennessee
22	Northwestern
23	Rutgers
24	Florida State
25	Arizona

Hero Sports
Rank	Team
1	Stanford
2	North Carolina
3	Duke
4	UCLA
5	UCF
6	Penn State
7	South Carolina
8	Pepperdine
9	Florida State
10	Texas A&M
11	USC
12	Santa Clara
13	Notre Dame
14	Rutgers
15	Princeton
16	Virginia
17	West Virginia
18	Florida
19	Georgetown
20	NC State
21	Ohio State
22	Arizona
23	Cal
24	Minnesota
25	Clemson

=== Major upsets ===
Games won by a team ranked 10 or more spots lower or an unranked squad that defeats a team ranked #15 or higher are considered "major upsets". United Soccer Coaches rankings are used for this list.

Date	Winner	Score	Loser
August 24, 2017	Wake Forest	3–2	#3 South Carolina
August 25, 2017	UCF	2–1 (2OT)	#4 North Carolina
August 27, 2017	Alabama	1–0	#6 Florida State
August 31, 2017	Wisconsin	1–0	#3 Virginia
September 1, 2017	Washington	1–0	#2 Florida
September 21, 2017	Texas A&M	2–1	#6 Florida
September 24, 2017	#17 Texas	1–0	#5 West Virginia
September 30, 2017	Ohio State	1–0	#6 Penn State
October 13, 2017	Kansas	2–1	#9 Texas
October 14, 2017	Columbia	2–0	#11 Princeton
October 15, 2017	Auburn	1–0	#10 Florida
October 15, 2017	Providence	1–0	#15 Georgetown
October 15, 2017	Rutgers	1–0	#12 Ohio State
October 19, 2017	Washington State	1–0	#2 UCLA
October 19, 2017	Vanderbilt	2–1	#11 Tennessee
October 22, 2017	Clemson	2–1	#15 Wake Forest
October 25, 2017	Wisconsin	1–0	#11 Penn State
October 27, 2017	#22 Oklahoma State	1–0	#8 Texas
October 31, 2017	Arkansas	1–0	#3 South Carolina
November 1, 2017	Baylor	2–1	#14 Texas
November 10, 2017	Vanderbilt	2–1	#14 Ohio State
November 11, 2017	Washington State	1–0	#8 UCF
November 19, 2017	#13 Princeton	2–1 (OT)	#2 North Carolina

=== Conference winners and tournaments ===
Conference	Regular Season Champion(s)	Tournament Winner	Conference Tournament	Tournament Dates	Tournament Venue (City)
America East	New Hampshire (Note: 1. 1 seed in conference tournament); Binghamton	Stony Brook	2017 Tournament	Oct. 26–Nov. 5	Campus sites, hosted by higher seed
American	UCF	South Florida	2017 Tournament	Nov. 1–Nov. 5	UCF Soccer and Track Stadium, Orlando, Florida
Atlantic 10	La Salle	La Salle	2017 Tournament	Oct. 28–Nov. 5	Quarterfinals: Campus sites, hosted by higher seed Semifinals and Final: Sports Backers Stadium, Richmond, Virginia
ACC	Duke	North Carolina	2017 Tournament	Oct. 29–Nov. 5	Quarterfinals: Campus sites, hosted by higher seed Semifinals and Final: MUSC Health Stadium, Charleston, South Carolina
Atlantic Sun	Lipscomb; Florida Gulf Coast	Florida Gulf Coast	2017 Tournament	Oct. 28–Nov. 5	First Round: Campus sites, hosted by higher seed Semifinals and Final: Lipscomb Soccer Complex, Nashville, Tennessee
Big 12	Oklahoma State	Baylor	2017 Tournament	Nov. 1–Nov. 5	Swope Soccer Village, Kansas City, Missouri
Big East	Georgetown	Georgetown	2017 Tournament	Oct. 29–Nov. 5	Campus sites, hosted by higher seed
Big Sky	Eastern Washington	Eastern Washington	2017 Tournament	Nov. 1–Nov. 5	EWU Complex, Cheney, Washington
Big South	High Point; Liberty	High Point	2017 Tournament	Oct. 27–Nov. 5	Quarterfinals: Campus sites, hosted by higher seed Semifinals and Final: Bryan Park, Greensboro, North Carolina
Big Ten	Ohio State	Penn State	2017 Tournament	Oct. 29–Nov. 5	Quarterfinals: Campus sites, hosted by higher seed Semifinals and Final: Grand Park, Westfield, Indiana
Big West	UC Irvine	Cal State Fullerton	2017 Tournament	Nov. 2–Nov. 5	Matador Soccer Field, Northridge, California
CAA	Hofstra	Hofstra	2017 Tournament	Oct. 29–Nov. 5	Quarterfinals: Campus sites, hosted by higher seed Semifinals and Final: Hofstra University Soccer Stadium, Hempstead, New York
C-USA	Rice	North Texas	2017 Tournament	Nov. 1–Nov. 5	FAU Soccer Stadium, Boca Raton, Florida
Horizon	Milwaukee	IUPUI	2017 Tournament	Oct. 30–Nov. 4	Quarterfinals: Campus sites, hosted by higher seed Semifinals and Final: Engelmann Field, Milwaukee, Wisconsin
Ivy	Princeton	No Tournament			
MAAC	Monmouth	Monmouth	2017 Tournament	Oct. 28–Nov. 1	ESPN Wide World of Sports Complex, Lake Buena Vista, Florida
MAC	Kent State	Toledo	2017 Tournament	Oct. 29–Nov. 5	Quarterfinals: Campus sites, hosted by higher seed Semifinals and Final: Dix Stadium, Kent, Ohio
Missouri Valley	Drake	Missouri State	2017 Tournament	Oct. 29–Nov. 5	Betty and Bobby Allison South Stadium, Springfield, Missouri
Mountain West	San Jose State	San Diego State	2017 Tournament	Oct. 31–Nov. 4	Peter Johann Memorial Soccer Field, Paradise, Nevada
Northeast	Fairleigh Dickinson; Saint Francis (PA)	Saint Francis (PA)	2017 Tournament	Nov. 3–Nov. 5	University Stadium, Teaneck, New Jersey
Ohio Valley	Murray State	Murray State	2017 Tournament	Oct. 27–Nov. 5	First Round and Quarterfinals: Campus sites, hosted by #3 and #4 seeds Semifinals and Final: Cutchin Field, Murray, Kentucky
Pac-12	Stanford	No Tournament			
Patriot	Navy	Bucknell	2017 Tournament	Oct. 31–Nov. 5	Quarterfinals: Campus sites, hosted by higher seed Semifinals and Final: Glenn Warner Soccer Facility, Annapolis, Maryland
SEC	South Carolina	Texas A&M	2017 Tournament	Oct. 29–Nov. 5	Orange Beach Sportsplex, Orange Beach, Alabama
SoCon	Furman; Samford	UNC Greensboro	2017 Tournament	Oct. 25–Nov. 5	First Round and Quarterfinals: Campus sites, hosted by higher seed Semifinals and Final: Samford University Track & Soccer Stadium, Birmingham, Alabama
Southland	Lamar	Lamar	2017 Tournament	Nov. 1–Nov. 5	Jack Dugan Stadium, Corpus Christi, Texas
The Summit	South Dakota State	Denver	2017 Tournament	Nov. 2–Nov. 4	Dacotah Field, Fargo, North Dakota
Sun Belt	South Alabama	South Alabama	2017 Tournament	Nov. 1–Nov. 5	Foley Sports Complex, Foley, Alabama
SWAC	Alabama State	Alabama State	2017 Tournament	Nov. 2–Nov. 5	PVA&M Soccer Stadium, Prairie View, Texas
WCC	Pepperdine	No Tournament			
WAC	UMKC	Utah Valley	2017 Tournament	Nov. 1–Nov. 5	GCU Stadium, Phoenix, Arizona

== Postseason ==
=== NCAA Tournament ===
The tournament field will consist of 31 teams which have qualified by virtue of winning their conference's automatic berth as well as 33 teams chosen at-large by the NCAA Division I Women's Soccer Committee. The bracket will be announced on November 6. The tournament will begin with first-round matches played at campus sites on November 10. The tournament will conclude with the semifinals and finals played at Orlando City Stadium in Orlando, Florida on December 1 and 3.

== Conference standings ==
2017 American Athletic Conference women's soccer standings
	Conf.						Overall
Team	W		L		T	PCT	W		L		T	PCT
No. 17 UCF ‍†‍‍^{y}	7	–	0	–	2	.889	13	–	2	–	3	.806
South Florida ‡^{y} ‍‍‍	7	–	1	–	1	.833	13	–	4	–	2	.737
Cincinnati ‍‍‍	5	–	2	–	2	.667	12	–	4	–	3	.711
Memphis ‍‍‍	4	–	2	–	3	.611	11	–	6	–	3	.625
Connecticut ‍‍‍	5	–	4	–	0	.556	7	–	9	–	3	.447
SMU ‍‍‍	4	–	4	–	1	.500	10	–	7	–	3	.575
Houston ‍‍‍	3	–	6	–	0	.333	7	–	9	–	1	.441
Temple ‍‍‍	2	–	6	–	1	.278	6	–	10	–	2	.389
Tulsa ‍‍‍	1	–	6	–	2	.222	3	–	12	–	4	.263
East Carolina ‍‍‍	1	–	8	–	0	.111	6	–	10	–	2	.389
† – Conference champion ‡ – 2017 AAC Tournament champion y – Invited to the NCAA Tournament; As of November 17, 2017; Rankings from United Soccer Coaches Poll; Source:American Athletic Conference

2017 America East Conference women's soccer standings
	Conf.						Overall
Team	W		L		T	PCT	W		L		T	PCT
New Hampshire † ‍‍‍	5	–	2	–	1	.688	11	–	6	–	1	.639
Binghamton ‍†‍‍	5	–	2	–	1	.688	11	–	4	–	4	.684
Albany ‍‍‍	4	–	3	–	1	.563	6	–	11	–	1	.361
Hartford ‍‍‍	4	–	3	–	1	.563	8	–	9	–	2	.474
Stony Brook ‍‍‡‍^{y}	4	–	4	–	0	.500	11	–	11	–	0	.500
Vermont ‍‍‍	3	–	4	–	1	.438	9	–	9	–	2	.500
Maine ‍‍‍	3	–	5	–	0	.375	5	–	10	–	1	.344
UMass Lowell ‍‍‍	2	–	3	–	3	.438	5	–	6	–	6	.471
UMBC ‍‍‍	2	–	6	–	0	.250	4	–	10	–	3	.324
† – Conference champion ‡ – 2017 America East Tournament champion y – Invited to the NCAA tournament As of November 10, 2017; Rankings from United Soccer Coaches Poll; Source:America East Conference

2017 Atlantic 10 Conference women's soccer standings
	Conf.						Overall
Team	W		L		T	PCT	W		L		T	PCT
La Salle ‍†‍‡‍^{y}	9	–	0	–	1	.950	17	–	4	–	2	.783
Saint Louis ‍‍‍	7	–	2	–	1	.750	15	–	3	–	2	.800
George Mason ‍‍‍	6	–	2	–	2	.700	9	–	9	–	2	.500
Duquesne ‍‍‍	6	–	3	–	1	.650	11	–	6	–	3	.625
George Washington ‍‍‍	5	–	2	–	3	.650	10	–	5	–	4	.632
VCU ‍‍‍	5	–	3	–	2	.600	11	–	6	–	3	.625
Saint Joseph's ‍‍‍	5	–	3	–	2	.600	11	–	6	–	3	.625
Dayton ‍‍‍	4	–	4	–	2	.500	9	–	9	–	2	.500
UMass ‍‍‍	4	–	5	–	1	.450	7	–	9	–	2	.444
Fordham ‍‍‍	3	–	5	–	2	.400	6	–	8	–	5	.447
Richmond ‍‍‍	2	–	6	–	2	.300	2	–	13	–	2	.176
St. Bonaventure ‍‍‍	2	–	6	–	2	.300	2	–	14	–	3	.184
Davidson ‍‍‍	0	–	7	–	3	.150	2	–	14	–	3	.184
Rhode Island ‍‍‍	0	–	10	–	0	.000	3	–	15	–	0	.167
† – Conference champion ‡ – 2017 Atlantic 10 Tournament champion y – Invited to the NCAA tournament As of November 11, 2017; Rankings from United Soccer Coaches Poll; Source:A10 Conference

2017 Atlantic Sun Conference women's soccer standings
	Conf.						Overall
Team	W		L		T	PCT	W		L		T	PCT
Lipscomb ‍†‍‍	5	–	1	–	1	.786	9	–	7	–	3	.553
Florida Gulf Coast †‡^{y} ‍‍‍	5	–	1	–	1	.786	14	–	4	–	1	.763
Stetson ‍‍‍	4	–	1	–	2	.714	9	–	4	–	3	.656
Kennesaw State ‍‍‍	3	–	3	–	1	.500	8	–	7	–	4	.526
North Florida ‍‍‍	3	–	4	–	0	.429	9	–	6	–	1	.594
Jacksonville ‍‍‍	2	–	5	–	0	.286	5	–	11	–	0	.313
NJIT ‍‍‍	2	–	5	–	0	.286	9	–	8	–	0	.529
USC Upstate ‍‍‍	1	–	5	–	1	.214	6	–	10	–	1	.382
† – Conference champion ‡ – 2017 ASUN Tournament champion y – Invited to the NCAA tournament As of November 11, 2017; Rankings from United Soccer Coaches Poll; Source:Atlantic Sun Conference

2017 ACC women's soccer standings
	Conf.						Overall
Team	W		L		T	PCT	W		L		T	PCT
No. 3 Duke ‍†‍‍^{y}	10	–	0	–	0	1.000	23	–	2	–	1	.904
#8 North Carolina ‡^{y} ‍‍‍	8	–	0	–	2	.900	17	–	3	–	2	.818
No. 21 NC State ‍‍‍^{y}	6	–	3	–	1	.650	15	–	5	–	2	.727
No. 9 Virginia ‍‍‍^{y}	5	–	2	–	3	.650	13	–	7	–	4	.625
Wake Forest ‍‍‍^{y}	5	–	3	–	2	.600	11	–	7	–	4	.591
No. 18 Notre Dame ‍‍‍^{y}	5	–	3	–	2	.600	9	–	8	–	5	.523
No. 15 Florida State ‍‍‍^{y}	5	–	4	–	1	.550	13	–	7	–	1	.643
Boston College ‍‍‍	4	–	5	–	1	.450	10	–	9	–	1	.525
Clemson ‍‍‍^{y}	3	–	4	–	3	.450	10	–	5	–	4	.632
Louisville ‍‍‍	3	–	5	–	2	.400	9	–	7	–	2	.556
Syracuse ‍‍‍	2	–	6	–	1	.278	7	–	8	–	2	.471
Virginia Tech ‍‍‍	1	–	5	–	3	.278	7	–	6	–	5	.528
Miami ‍‍‍	1	–	9	–	0	.100	5	–	11	–	0	.313
Pittsburgh ‍‍‍	0	–	9	–	1	.050	3	–	12	–	3	.250
† – Conference champion ‡ – 2017 ACC Tournament champion y – Invited to the NCAA Tournament; As of December 7, 2017; Rankings from United Soccer Coaches Poll; Source: The ACC

2017 Big East Conference women's soccer standings
	Conf.						Overall
Team	W		L		T	PCT	W		L		T	PCT
#24 Georgetown †‡^{y} ‍‍‍	6	–	1	–	2	.778	14	–	3	–	4	.762
Butler ‍‍‍^{y}	5	–	0	–	4	.778	13	–	2	–	6	.762
Providence ‍‍‍	5	–	3	–	1	.611	10	–	8	–	2	.550
Marquette ‍‍‍	5	–	4	–	0	.556	13	–	7	–	1	.643
Xavier ‍‍‍	4	–	3	–	2	.556	8	–	8	–	4	.500
DePaul ‍‍‍	3	–	2	–	4	.556	7	–	7	–	5	.500
St. John's ‍‍‍	4	–	5	–	0	.444	8	–	9	–	1	.472
Creighton ‍‍‍	2	–	5	–	2	.333	4	–	11	–	3	.306
Villanova ‍‍‍	2	–	7	–	0	.222	6	–	12	–	0	.333
Seton Hall ‍‍‍	0	–	6	–	3	.167	0	–	12	–	5	.147
† – Conference champion ‡ – 2017 Big East Tournament champion y – Invited to the NCAA tournament As of November 12, 2017; Rankings from United Soccer Coaches Poll; Source:The Big East Conference

2017 Big Sky Conference women's soccer standings
	Conf.						Overall
Team	W		L		T	PCT	W		L		T	PCT
Eastern Washington †‡^{y} ‍‍‍	8	–	1	–	1	.850	16	–	6	–	1	.717
Montana ‍‍‍	5	–	2	–	3	.650	10	–	7	–	4	.571
Northern Colorado ‍‍‍	5	–	3	–	2	.600	13	–	7	–	2	.636
Portland State ‍‍‍	5	–	4	–	1	.550	9	–	10	–	1	.475
Northern Arizona ‍‍‍	4	–	5	–	1	.450	9	–	10	–	1	.475
Sacramento State ‍‍‍	3	–	3	–	4	.500	8	–	8	–	4	.500
Idaho ‍‍‍	4	–	5	–	1	.450	8	–	9	–	2	.474
North Dakota ‍‍‍	4	–	5	–	1	.450	6	–	8	–	4	.444
Southern Utah ‍‍‍	4	–	6	–	0	.400	5	–	13	–	0	.278
Weber State ‍‍‍	2	–	5	–	3	.350	3	–	12	–	3	.250
Idaho State ‍‍‍	2	–	7	–	1	.250	3	–	14	–	1	.194
† – Conference champion ‡ – 2017 Big Sky Tournament champion y – Invited to the NCAA tournament As of November 11, 2017; Rankings from United Soccer Coaches Poll; Source:The Big Sky Conference

2017 Big South Conference women's soccer standings
	Conf.						Overall
Team	W		L		T	PCT	W		L		T	PCT
High Point ‍†‍‡‍^{y}	7	–	1	–	1	.833	13	–	8	–	1	.614
Liberty ‍†‍‍	7	–	1	–	1	.833	10	–	7	–	3	.575
Longwood ‍‍‍	6	–	1	–	2	.778	13	–	5	–	3	.690
Campbell ‍‍‍	5	–	2	–	2	.667	10	–	7	–	2	.579
Radford ‍‍‍	4	–	5	–	0	.444	11	–	7	–	0	.611
Charleston Southern ‍‍‍	3	–	5	–	1	.389	5	–	11	–	2	.333
Gardner–Webb ‍‍‍	2	–	4	–	3	.389	4	–	12	–	3	.289
Winthrop ‍‍‍	2	–	6	–	1	.278	5	–	10	–	2	.353
UNC Asheville ‍‍‍	2	–	6	–	1	.278	6	–	10	–	2	.389
Presbyterian ‍‍‍	1	–	8	–	0	.111	3	–	13	–	0	.188
† – Conference champion ‡ – 2017 Big South Tournament champion y – Invited to the NCAA tournament As of November 11, 2017; Rankings from United Soccer Coaches Poll; Source:Big South Conference

2017 Big Ten Conference women's soccer standings
	Conf.						Overall
Team	W		L		T	PCT	W		L		T	PCT
No. 23 Ohio State ‍†‍‍^{y}	9	–	2	–	0	.818	15	–	5	–	1	.738
Northwestern ‍‍‍^{y}	7	–	3	–	1	.682	12	–	8	–	3	.587
Minnesota ‍‍‍	7	–	3	–	1	.682	11	–	5	–	3	.658
No. 22 Rutgers ‍‍‍^{y}	6	–	2	–	3	.682	13	–	2	–	6	.762
#5 Penn State ‡^{y} ‍‍‍	6	–	2	–	3	.682	15	–	5	–	4	.708
Wisconsin ‍‍‍^{y}	6	–	3	–	2	.636	14	–	6	–	2	.682
Purdue ‍‍‍	5	–	4	–	2	.545	10	–	7	–	2	.579
Iowa ‍‍‍	4	–	5	–	2	.455	9	–	8	–	2	.526
Nebraska ‍‍‍	3	–	3	–	5	.500	9	–	5	–	5	.605
Michigan ‍‍‍	3	–	5	–	3	.409	6	–	6	–	6	.500
Indiana ‍‍‍	2	–	6	–	3	.318	6	–	9	–	4	.421
Michigan State ‍‍‍	2	–	8	–	1	.227	6	–	11	–	1	.361
Illinois ‍‍‍	2	–	9	–	0	.182	5	–	14	–	0	.263
Maryland ‍‍‍	1	–	8	–	2	.182	7	–	8	–	3	.472
† – Conference champion ‡ – 2017 Big Ten Tournament champion y – Invited to the NCAA tournament As of November 24, 2017; Rankings from United Soccer Coaches Poll; Source:The Big Ten Conference

2017 Big West Conference women's soccer standings
	Conf.						Overall
Team	W		L		T	PCT	W		L		T	PCT
UC Irvine ‍†‍‍	5	–	2	–	1	.688	10	–	6	–	4	.600
Cal State Northridge ‍‍‍	4	–	1	–	3	.688	9	–	4	–	8	.619
UC Riverside ‍‍‍	5	–	3	–	0	.625	8	–	11	–	2	.429
Cal State Fullerton ‡^{y} ‍‍‍	4	–	3	–	1	.563	12	–	6	–	4	.636
Long Beach State ‍‍‍	3	–	3	–	2	.500	9	–	6	–	3	.583
UC Davis ‍‍‍	3	–	3	–	2	.500	4	–	12	–	2	.278
UC Santa Barbara ‍‍‍	2	–	4	–	2	.375	6	–	8	–	5	.447
Cal Poly ‍‍‍	2	–	4	–	2	.375	7	–	9	–	3	.447
Hawaii ‍‍‍	1	–	6	–	1	.188	6	–	10	–	1	.382
† – Conference champion ‡ – 2017 Big West Tournament champion y – Invited to the NCAA tournament As of November 11, 2017; Rankings from United Soccer Coaches Poll; Source:The Big West Conference

2017 Big 12 Conference women's soccer standings
	Conf.						Overall
Team	W		L		T	PCT	W		L		T	PCT
No. 17 Oklahoma State ‍†‍‍^{y}	8	–	1	–	0	.889	17	–	4	–	3	.771
No. 7 West Virginia ‍‍‍^{y}	7	–	1	–	1	.833	16	–	4	–	3	.761
TCU ‍‍‍^{y}	6	–	2	–	1	.722	12	–	7	–	3	.614
No. 18 Texas ‍‍‍^{y}	5	–	2	–	2	.667	14	–	4	–	3	.738
No. 23 Baylor ‍‍‡‍^{y}	4	–	4	–	1	.500	15	–	5	–	3	.717
Kansas ‍‍‍	3	–	5	–	1	.389	8	–	9	–	3	.475
Texas Tech ‍‍‍	2	–	4	–	3	.389	9	–	7	–	3	.553
Oklahoma ‍‍‍	1	–	5	–	3	.278	3	–	13	–	4	.250
Iowa State ‍‍‍	1	–	6	–	2	.222	3	–	12	–	3	.250
Kansas State ‍‍‍	1	–	8	–	0	.111	6	–	11	–	1	.361
† – Conference champion ‡ – Tournament champion y – Invited to the NCAA tournament Rankings from United Soccer Coaches

2017 Colonial Athletic Association women's soccer standings
	Conf.						Overall
Team	W		L		T	PCT	W		L		T	PCT
Hofstra ‍†‍‡‍^{y}	9	–	0	–	0	1.000	15	–	4	–	2	.762
Drexel ‍‍‍	6	–	2	–	1	.722	11	–	7	–	1	.605
Northeastern ‍‍‍	5	–	1	–	3	.722	13	–	6	–	3	.659
James Madison ‍‍‍	4	–	5	–	0	.444	9	–	10	–	0	.474
William & Mary ‍‍‍	3	–	4	–	2	.444	8	–	10	–	2	.450
College of Charleston ‍‍‍	3	–	5	–	1	.389	8	–	9	–	1	.472
Elon ‍‍‍	2	–	4	–	3	.389	9	–	6	–	4	.579
Delaware ‍‍‍	3	–	6	–	0	.333	6	–	10	–	2	.389
Towson ‍‍‍	2	–	6	–	1	.278	5	–	11	–	3	.342
UNC Wilmington ‍‍‍	2	–	6	–	1	.278	6	–	11	–	2	.368
† – Conference champion ‡ – 2017 CAA Tournament champion y – Invited to the NCAA Tournament; As of November 10, 2017; Rankings from United Soccer Coaches Poll; Source:Colonial Athletic Association

2017 Conference USA women's soccer standings
	Conf.						Overall
Team	W		L		T	PCT	W		L		T	PCT
Rice ‍†‍‍^{y}	9	–	0	–	1	.950	12	–	4	–	2	.722
North Texas ‍‍‡‍^{y}	6	–	1	–	2	.778	13	–	4	–	4	.714
UAB ‍‍‍	7	–	2	–	1	.750	13	–	4	–	3	.725
Louisiana Tech ‍‍‍	6	–	1	–	3	.750	14	–	3	–	5	.750
Old Dominion ‍‍‍	6	–	2	–	2	.700	9	–	5	–	4	.611
Florida Atlantic ‍‍‍	5	–	4	–	1	.550	11	–	8	–	2	.571
Middle Tennessee ‍‍‍	5	–	5	–	0	.500	8	–	10	–	0	.444
Charlotte ‍‍‍	4	–	5	–	1	.450	11	–	8	–	2	.571
Western Kentucky ‍‍‍	4	–	5	–	1	.450	7	–	9	–	1	.441
UTEP ‍‍‍	4	–	6	–	0	.400	8	–	11	–	0	.421
Marshall ‍‍‍	3	–	6	–	1	.350	5	–	11	–	1	.324
UTSA ‍‍‍	2	–	8	–	0	.200	3	–	14	–	0	.176
Southern Miss ‍‍‍	0	–	7	–	3	.150	6	–	9	–	3	.417
FIU ‍‍‍	0	–	9	–	0	.000	1	–	13	–	0	.071
† – Conference champion ‡ – 2017 C-USA Tournament champion y – Invited to the NCAA tournament As of November 10, 2017; Rankings from United Soccer Coaches Poll; Source:Conference USA

2017 Horizon League women's soccer standings
	Conf.						Overall
Team	W		L		T	PCT	W		L		T	PCT
Milwaukee ‍†‍‍	7	–	0	–	2	.889	16	–	0	–	4	.900
Northern Kentucky ‍‍‍	6	–	1	–	2	.778	9	–	6	–	2	.588
IUPUI ‍‍‡‍^{y}	6	–	2	–	1	.722	14	–	6	–	3	.674
Wright State ‍‍‍	6	–	3	–	0	.667	12	–	8	–	0	.600
UIC ‍‍‍	5	–	4	–	0	.556	7	–	13	–	0	.350
Cleveland State ‍‍‍	5	–	4	–	0	.556	9	–	9	–	1	.500
Green Bay ‍‍‍	3	–	5	–	1	.389	4	–	11	–	1	.281
Oakland ‍‍‍	3	–	6	–	0	.333	3	–	14	–	1	.194
Detroit ‍‍‍	1	–	8	–	0	.111	4	–	13	–	1	.250
Youngstown State ‍‍‍	0	–	9	–	0	.000	4	–	13	–	1	.250
† – Conference champion ‡ – 2017 Horizon League Tournament champion y – Invited to the NCAA tournament As of November 11, 2017; Rankings from United Soccer Coaches Poll; Source:Horizon League

2017 Ivy League women's soccer standings
	Conf.						Overall
Team	W		L		T	PCT	W		L		T	PCT
#7 Princeton †^{y} ‍‍‍	6	–	1	–	0	.857	16	–	3	–	1	.825
Columbia ‍‍‍	5	–	1	–	1	.786	9	–	5	–	2	.625
Yale ‍‍‍	4	–	2	–	1	.643	11	–	4	–	2	.706
Brown ‍‍‍	4	–	3	–	0	.571	11	–	5	–	0	.688
Penn ‍‍‍	3	–	3	–	1	.500	5	–	8	–	3	.406
Harvard ‍‍‍	2	–	4	–	1	.357	8	–	8	–	1	.500
Dartmouth ‍‍‍	1	–	6	–	0	.143	7	–	10	–	0	.412
Cornell ‍‍‍	0	–	5	–	2	.143	2	–	9	–	3	.250
† – Conference champion y – Invited to the NCAA Tournament; As of November 25, 2017; Rankings from United Soccer Coaches Poll; Source:Ivy League

2017 Mid-American Conference women's soccer standings
	Conf.						Overall
Team	W		L		T	PCT	W		L		T	PCT
East Division
Kent State ‍†‍‍	9	–	2	–	0	.818	13	–	6	–	2	.667
Bowling Green ‍‍‍	6	–	4	–	1	.591	13	–	7	–	1	.643
Buffalo ‍‍‍	5	–	4	–	2	.545	7	–	9	–	3	.447
Ohio ‍‍‍	4	–	5	–	2	.455	7	–	10	–	3	.425
Miami (OH) ‍‍‍	2	–	8	–	1	.227	2	–	15	–	1	.139
Akron ‍‍‍	1	–	7	–	3	.227	2	–	13	–	4	.211
West Division
Ball State ‍‍‍	8	–	1	–	2	.818	11	–	7	–	3	.595
Toledo ‍‍‡‍^{y}	6	–	3	–	2	.636	12	–	8	–	3	.587
Western Michigan ‍‍‍	5	–	5	–	1	.500	10	–	8	–	1	.553
Northern Illinois ‍‍‍	5	–	6	–	0	.455	8	–	10	–	1	.447
Eastern Michigan ‍‍‍	4	–	7	–	0	.364	7	–	12	–	1	.375
Central Michigan ‍‍‍	3	–	6	–	2	.364	8	–	8	–	3	.500
† – Conference champion ‡ – 2017 MAC Tournament champion y – Invited to the NCAA tournament As of November 10, 2017; Rankings from United Soccer Coaches Poll; Source:Mid-American Conference

2017 MAAC women's soccer standings
	Conf.						Overall
Team	W		L		T	PCT	W		L		T	PCT
Monmouth ‍†‍‡‍^{y}	9	–	1	–	0	.900	15	–	4	–	2	.762
Manhattan ‍‍‍	6	–	2	–	2	.700	10	–	7	–	3	.575
Quinnipiac ‍‍‍	5	–	2	–	3	.650	9	–	7	–	3	.553
Siena ‍‍‍	6	–	4	–	0	.600	11	–	8	–	0	.579
Marist ‍‍‍	5	–	3	–	2	.600	8	–	8	–	3	.500
Rider ‍‍‍	4	–	3	–	3	.550	5	–	10	–	3	.361
Fairfield ‍‍‍	4	–	5	–	1	.450	6	–	9	–	2	.412
Niagara ‍‍‍	3	–	6	–	1	.350	7	–	9	–	3	.447
Canisius ‍‍‍	2	–	6	–	2	.300	7	–	8	–	3	.472
Iona ‍‍‍	2	–	7	–	1	.250	3	–	14	–	3	.225
Saint Peter's ‍‍‍	1	–	8	–	1	.150	3	–	13	–	1	.206
† – Conference champion ‡ – 2017 MAAC Tournament champion y – Invited to the NCAA Tournament; As of November 10, 2017; Rankings from United Soccer Coaches Poll; Source:MAAC

2017 Missouri Valley Conference women's soccer standings
	Conf.						Overall
Team	W		L		T	PCT	W		L		T	PCT
Drake ‍†‍‍	6	–	0	–	1	.929	13	–	4	–	2	.737
Missouri State ‡^{y} ‍‍‍	4	–	2	–	1	.643	10	–	9	–	2	.524
Loyola Chicago ‍‍‍	4	–	3	–	0	.571	13	–	7	–	0	.650
Northern Iowa ‍‍‍	4	–	3	–	0	.571	14	–	5	–	1	.725
Illinois State ‍‍‍	3	–	4	–	0	.429	9	–	9	–	2	.500
Valparaiso ‍‍‍	3	–	4	–	0	.429	9	–	10	–	0	.474
Evansville ‍‍‍	2	–	5	–	0	.286	6	–	11	–	0	.353
Indiana State ‍‍‍	1	–	6	–	0	.143	6	–	10	–	1	.382
† – Conference champion ‡ – 2017 Missouri Valley Tournament champion y – Invited to the NCAA tournament As of November 11, 2017; Rankings from United Soccer Coaches Poll; Source:Missouri Valley Conference

2017 Mountain West Conference women's soccer standings
	Conf.						Overall
Team	W		L		T	PCT	W		L		T	PCT
San Jose State ‍†‍‍	9	–	1	–	1	.864	12	–	6	–	2	.650
San Diego State ‡^{y} ‍‍‍	7	–	2	–	2	.727	12	–	8	–	2	.591
Boise State ‍‍‍	7	–	2	–	2	.727	13	–	6	–	3	.659
New Mexico ‍‍‍	7	–	4	–	0	.636	12	–	8	–	2	.591
Fresno State ‍‍‍	5	–	4	–	2	.545	10	–	6	–	4	.600
Air Force ‍‍‍	4	–	4	–	3	.500	7	–	9	–	3	.447
UNLV ‍‍‍	5	–	6	–	0	.455	13	–	7	–	0	.650
Utah State ‍‍‍	4	–	5	–	2	.455	9	–	7	–	3	.553
Wyoming ‍‍‍	4	–	6	–	1	.409	8	–	9	–	2	.474
Colorado College ‍‍‍	3	–	6	–	2	.364	6	–	9	–	4	.421
Colorado State ‍‍‍	2	–	6	–	3	.318	4	–	10	–	5	.342
Nevada ‍‍‍	0	–	11	–	0	.000	1	–	18	–	0	.053
† – Conference champion ‡ – 2017 MW Tournament champion y – Invited to the NCAA tournament As of November 10, 2017; Rankings from United Soccer Coaches Poll; Source:Mountain West Conference

2017 Northeast Conference women's soccer standings
	Conf.						Overall
Team	W		L		T	PCT	W		L		T	PCT
Fairleigh Dickinson † ‍‍‍	6	–	1	–	1	.813	9	–	8	–	4	.524
Saint Francis (PA) ‍†‍‡‍^{y}	6	–	1	–	1	.813	10	–	8	–	3	.548
Central Connecticut ‍‍‍	6	–	2	–	0	.750	10	–	8	–	0	.556
Bryant ‍‍‍	5	–	3	–	0	.625	11	–	5	–	2	.667
Sacred Heart ‍‍‍	4	–	4	–	0	.500	7	–	11	–	0	.389
Robert Morris ‍‍‍	4	–	4	–	0	.500	6	–	11	–	0	.353
Mount St. Mary's ‍‍‍	2	–	6	–	0	.250	5	–	12	–	1	.306
LIU Brooklyn ‍‍‍	1	–	6	–	1	.188	3	–	12	–	2	.235
Wagner ‍‍‍	0	–	7	–	1	.063	3	–	12	–	3	.250
† – Conference champion ‡ – 2017 NEC Tournament champion y – Invited to the NCAA tournament As of November 11, 2017; Rankings from United Soccer Coaches Poll; Source:Northeast Conference

2017 Ohio Valley Conference women's soccer standings
	Conf.						Overall
Team	W		L		T	PCT	W		L		T	PCT
Murray State ‍†‍‡‍^{y}	8	–	0	–	2	.900	15	–	2	–	2	.842
Tennessee Tech ‍‍‍	6	–	1	–	3	.750	9	–	5	–	3	.618
Eastern Kentucky ‍‍‍	6	–	1	–	3	.750	11	–	5	–	4	.650
Belmont ‍‍‍	6	–	4	–	0	.600	10	–	6	–	2	.611
Southeast Missouri ‍‍‍	4	–	3	–	3	.550	8	–	8	–	4	.500
UT Martin ‍‍‍	4	–	5	–	1	.450	6	–	11	–	3	.375
SIU Edwardsville ‍‍‍	4	–	5	–	1	.450	7	–	10	–	2	.421
Austin Peay ‍‍‍	3	–	4	–	3	.450	8	–	7	–	3	.528
Jacksonville State ‍‍‍	3	–	7	–	0	.300	6	–	10	–	2	.389
Morehead State ‍‍‍	2	–	7	–	1	.250	3	–	13	–	1	.206
Eastern Illinois ‍‍‍	0	–	9	–	1	.050	5	–	12	–	2	.316
† – Conference champion ‡ – 2017 OVC Tournament champion y – Invited to the NCAA tournament As of November 11, 2017; Rankings from United Soccer Coaches Poll; Source:Ohio Valley Conference

2017 Pac-12 Conference women's soccer standings
	Conf.						Overall
Team	W		L		T	PCT	W		L		T	PCT
No. 1 Stanford ‍†‍‍^{y}	11	–	0	–	0	1.000	24	–	1	–	0	.960
No. 2 UCLA ‍‍‍^{y}	8	–	2	–	1	.773	19	–	3	–	3	.820
No. 13 USC ‍‍‍^{y}	8	–	2	–	1	.773	15	–	3	–	2	.800
Arizona ‍‍‍^{y}	7	–	2	–	2	.727	11	–	5	–	4	.650
California ‍‍‍^{y}	6	–	4	–	1	.591	13	–	6	–	1	.675
Colorado ‍‍‍^{y}	5	–	4	–	2	.545	12	–	6	–	4	.636
#19 Washington State ^{y} ‍‍‍	4	–	6	–	1	.409	10	–	8	–	4	.545
Oregon State ‍‍‍	3	–	7	–	1	.318	6	–	10	–	3	.395
Washington ‍‍‍	2	–	6	–	3	.318	9	–	8	–	3	.525
Arizona State ‍‍‍	2	–	7	–	2	.273	5	–	11	–	3	.342
Oregon ‍‍‍	2	–	9	–	0	.182	8	–	11	–	0	.421
Utah ‍‍‍	0	–	9	–	2	.091	5	–	11	–	3	.342
† – Conference champion y – Invited to the NCAA Tournament; As of December 3, 2017; Rankings from United Soccer Coaches Poll; Source:Pac 12

2017 Patriot League women's soccer standings
	Conf.						Overall
Team	W		L		T	PCT	W		L		T	PCT
Navy ‍†‍‍	8	–	0	–	1	.944	16	–	4	–	1	.786
Bucknell ‍‍‡‍^{y}	7	–	2	–	0	.778	12	–	9	–	0	.571
Boston University ‍‍‍	6	–	2	–	1	.722	10	–	8	–	3	.548
Colgate ‍‍‍	5	–	2	–	2	.667	10	–	7	–	2	.579
Lehigh ‍‍‍	5	–	2	–	2	.667	9	–	5	–	4	.611
Lafayette ‍‍‍	3	–	5	–	1	.389	5	–	9	–	2	.375
Holy Cross ‍‍‍	2	–	4	–	3	.389	4	–	9	–	4	.353
Army ‍‍‍	2	–	6	–	1	.278	4	–	11	–	2	.294
American ‍‍‍	1	–	8	–	0	.111	2	–	15	–	0	.118
Loyola (MD) ‍‍‍	0	–	8	–	1	.056	3	–	13	–	1	.206
† – Conference champion ‡ – 2017 Patriot League tournament champion y – Invited to the NCAA tournament As of November 11, 2017; Rankings from United Soccer Coaches Poll; Source:Patriot League

2017 SEC women's soccer standings
	Conf.						Overall
Team	W		L		T	PCT	W		L		T	PCT
#4 South Carolina †^{y} ‍‍‍	9	–	0	–	1	.950	19	–	3	–	1	.848
No. 12 Texas A&M ‍‍‡‍^{y}	9	–	1	–	0	.900	18	–	2	–	2	.864
No. 6 Florida ‍‍‍^{y}	7	–	3	–	0	.700	17	–	7	–	0	.708
Vanderbilt ‍‍‍^{y}	6	–	3	–	1	.650	13	–	7	–	2	.636
No. 25 Tennessee ‍‍‍^{y}	6	–	3	–	1	.650	15	–	4	–	2	.762
Auburn ‍‍‍^{y}	4	–	2	–	4	.600	8	–	7	–	5	.525
Arkansas ‍‍‍^{y}	4	–	5	–	1	.450	11	–	11	–	2	.500
Alabama ‍‍‍^{y}	4	–	5	–	1	.450	12	–	8	–	1	.595
Ole Miss ‍‍‍^{y}	3	–	5	–	2	.400	10	–	7	–	3	.575
Missouri ‍‍‍	3	–	7	–	0	.300	8	–	12	–	1	.405
Kentucky ‍‍‍	3	–	7	–	0	.300	8	–	12	–	0	.400
Mississippi State ‍‍‍	2	–	5	–	3	.350	8	–	5	–	4	.588
LSU ‍‍‍	1	–	6	–	3	.250	8	–	7	–	3	.528
Georgia ‍‍‍	0	–	9	–	1	.050	4	–	12	–	2	.278
† – Conference champion ‡ – 2017 SEC Tournament champion y – Invited to the NCAA tournament As of December 1, 2017; Rankings from United Soccer Coaches Poll; Source:SEC

2017 Southern Conference women's soccer standings
	Conf.						Overall
Team	W		L		T	PCT	W		L		T	PCT
Furman ‍†‍‍	8	–	0	–	1	.944	13	–	3	–	2	.778
Samford ‍†‍‍	8	–	0	–	1	.944	13	–	6	–	2	.667
UNC Greensboro ‍‍‡‍^{y}	5	–	2	–	2	.667	11	–	8	–	3	.568
Western Carolina ‍‍‍	4	–	4	–	1	.500	9	–	10	–	2	.476
VMI ‍‍‍	4	–	4	–	1	.500	7	–	11	–	1	.395
Chattanooga ‍‍‍	3	–	4	–	2	.444	5	–	10	–	4	.368
Mercer ‍‍‍	3	–	5	–	1	.389	10	–	10	–	1	.500
East Tennessee State ‍‍‍	3	–	6	–	0	.333	6	–	13	–	0	.316
Wofford ‍‍‍	2	–	6	–	1	.278	7	–	11	–	1	.395
The Citadel ‍‍‍	0	–	9	–	0	.000	5	–	13	–	0	.278
† – Conference champion ‡ – 2017 Southern Tournament champion y – Invited to the NCAA tournament As of November 11, 2017; Rankings from United Soccer Coaches Poll; Source:SoCon

2017 Southland Conference women's soccer standings
	Conf.						Overall
Team	W		L		T	PCT	W		L		T	PCT
Lamar ‍†‍‡‍^{y}	10	–	1	–	0	.909	18	–	4	–	1	.804
Stephen F. Austin ‍‍‍	8	–	3	–	0	.727	12	–	8	–	1	.595
McNeese State ‍‍‍	8	–	3	–	0	.727	12	–	5	–	2	.684
Central Arkansas ‍‍‍	7	–	4	–	0	.636	11	–	10	–	0	.524
Houston Baptist ‍‍‍	6	–	3	–	2	.636	7	–	7	–	3	.500
Abilene Christian ‍‍‍	6	–	5	–	0	.545	8	–	10	–	2	.450
Sam Houston State ‍‍‍	4	–	5	–	2	.455	7	–	9	–	2	.444
Texas A&M–Corpus Christi ‍‍‍	3	–	6	–	2	.364	6	–	9	–	3	.417
Southeastern Louisiana ‍‍‍	3	–	6	–	2	.364	5	–	10	–	3	.361
Nicholls State ‍‍‍	3	–	7	–	1	.318	6	–	11	–	1	.361
Northwestern State ‍‍‍	2	–	9	–	0	.182	6	–	12	–	0	.333
Incarnate Word ‍‍‍	1	–	9	–	1	.136	2	–	13	–	1	.156
† – Conference champion ‡ – 2017 Southland Tournament champion y – Invited to the NCAA tournament As of November 10, 2017; Rankings from United Soccer Coaches Poll; Source:Southland Conference

2017 SWAC women's soccer standings
	Conf.						Overall
Team	W		L		T	PCT	W		L		T	PCT
Alabama State ‍†‍‡‍^{y}	8	–	2	–	0	.800	11	–	8	–	2	.571
Grambling State ‍‍‍	7	–	2	–	1	.750	11	–	7	–	2	.600
Howard ‍‍‍	7	–	2	–	1	.750	9	–	10	–	1	.475
Prairie View A&M ‍‍‍	6	–	2	–	2	.700	6	–	9	–	2	.412
Texas Southern ‍‍‍	6	–	3	–	1	.650	8	–	7	–	3	.528
Mississippi Valley State ‍‍‍	5	–	4	–	1	.550	7	–	11	–	1	.395
Jackson State ‍‍‍	2	–	5	–	3	.350	2	–	14	–	3	.184
Alcorn State ‍‍‍	3	–	7	–	0	.300	4	–	10	–	0	.286
Alabama A&M ‍‍‍	3	–	7	–	0	.300	4	–	14	–	0	.222
Arkansas–Pine Bluff ‍‍‍	2	–	7	–	1	.250	2	–	13	–	1	.156
Southern ‍‍‍	0	–	8	–	2	.100	0	–	13	–	2	.067
† – Conference champion ‡ – 2017 SWAC Tournament champion y – Invited to the NCAA tournament As of November 10, 2017; Rankings from United Soccer Coaches Poll; Source:SWAC

2017 Sun Belt Conference women's soccer standings
	Conf.						Overall
Team	W		L		T	PCT	W		L		T	PCT
South Alabama †‡^{y} ‍‍‍	9	–	1	–	0	.900	14	–	6	–	1	.690
Texas State ‍‍‍	8	–	2	–	0	.800	10	–	6	–	1	.618
Troy ‍‍‍	6	–	4	–	0	.600	8	–	10	–	2	.450
Arkansas State ‍‍‍	5	–	4	–	1	.550	9	–	6	–	2	.588
Little Rock ‍‍‍	4	–	4	–	2	.500	9	–	9	–	3	.500
Georgia Southern ‍‍‍	4	–	5	–	1	.450	8	–	9	–	2	.474
Coastal Carolina ‍‍‍	4	–	5	–	1	.450	11	–	8	–	1	.575
Appalachian State ‍‍‍	3	–	5	–	2	.400	4	–	11	–	4	.316
Louisiana–Monroe ‍‍‍	3	–	6	–	1	.350	3	–	13	–	2	.222
Louisiana–Lafayette ‍‍‍	2	–	6	–	2	.300	5	–	10	–	2	.353
Georgia State ‍‍‍	1	–	7	–	2	.200	3	–	11	–	3	.265
† – Conference champion ‡ – 2017 Sun Belt Tournament champion y – Invited to the NCAA tournament As of November 10, 2017; Rankings from United Soccer Coaches Poll; Source:Sun Belt

2017 Summit League women's soccer standings
	Conf.						Overall
Team	W		L		T	PCT	W		L		T	PCT
South Dakota State † ‍‍‍	7	–	0	–	0	1.000	11	–	5	–	3	.658
Denver ‍‍‡‍^{y}	5	–	2	–	0	.714	11	–	9	–	1	.548
Oral Roberts ‍‍‍	5	–	2	–	0	.714	8	–	10	–	1	.447
North Dakota State ‍‍‍	5	–	2	–	0	.714	8	–	11	–	0	.421
Omaha ‍‍‍	3	–	4	–	0	.429	6	–	10	–	1	.382
South Dakota ‍‍‍	2	–	5	–	0	.286	4	–	13	–	0	.235
Western Illinois ‍‍‍	1	–	6	–	0	.143	2	–	15	–	0	.118
Fort Wayne ‍‍‍	0	–	7	–	0	.000	1	–	17	–	0	.056
† – Conference champion ‡ – 2017 Summit League Tournament champion y – Invited to the NCAA Tournament; As of November 12, 2017; Rankings from United Soccer Coaches Poll; Source:Summit League

2017 West Coast Conference women's soccer standings
	Conf.						Overall
Team	W		L		T	PCT	W		L		T	PCT
No. 16 Pepperdine ‍†‍‍^{y}	8	–	0	–	1	.944	15	–	3	–	3	.786
No. 20 Santa Clara ‍‍‍^{y}	8	–	1	–	0	.889	15	–	7	–	1	.674
San Diego ‍‍‍	6	–	3	–	0	.667	8	–	11	–	0	.421
BYU ‍‍‍	4	–	4	–	1	.500	7	–	8	–	4	.474
Loyola Marymount ‍‍‍	4	–	4	–	1	.500	9	–	6	–	4	.579
San Francisco ‍‍‍	4	–	5	–	0	.444	8	–	10	–	2	.450
Saint Mary's ‍‍‍	3	–	5	–	1	.389	7	–	11	–	1	.395
Gonzaga ‍‍‍	2	–	7	–	0	.222	10	–	8	–	1	.553
Pacific ‍‍‍	2	–	7	–	0	.222	5	–	13	–	2	.300
Portland ‍‍‍	2	–	7	–	0	.222	5	–	13	–	1	.289
† – Conference champion y – Invited to the NCAA Tournament; As of November 19, 2017; Rankings from United Soccer Coaches Poll; Source:West Coast Conference

2017 WAC women's soccer standings
	Conf.						Overall
Team	W		L		T	PCT	W		L		T	PCT
UMKC ‍†‍‍	7	–	0	–	0	1.000	12	–	7	–	1	.625
Utah Valley ‍‍‡‍^{y}	5	–	2	–	0	.714	10	–	12	–	1	.457
UTRGV ‍‍‍	4	–	2	–	1	.643	9	–	8	–	3	.525
Seattle ‍‍‍	3	–	2	–	2	.571	10	–	8	–	4	.545
New Mexico State ‍‍‍	3	–	3	–	1	.500	9	–	10	–	2	.476
Grand Canyon ‍‍‍	2	–	4	–	1	.357	6	–	13	–	2	.333
Cal State Bakersfield ‍‍‍	1	–	5	–	1	.214	6	–	12	–	1	.342
Chicago State ‍‍‍	0	–	7	–	0	.000	1	–	19	–	0	.050
† – Conference champion ‡ – 2017 WAC Tournament champion y – Invited to the NCAA tournament As of November 11, 2017; Rankings from United Soccer Coaches Poll; Source:WAC

== Attendances ==
The 40 women's college soccer teams with the highest average home attendance:

#	Football club	Average attendance
1	BYU Cougars	3,006
2	Texas A&M Aggies	2,694
3	UCLA Bruins	2,670
4	South Carolina Gamecocks	2,064
5	Penn State Nittany Lions	1,709
6	Kansas State Wildcats	1,688
7	Virginia Cavaliers	1,547
8	Tennessee Volunteers	1,440
9	Stanford Cardinal	1,372
10	Arkansas Razorbacks	1,354
11	TCU Horned Frogs	1,337
12	Portland Pilots	1,310
13	Utah Utes	1,299
14	Clemson Tigers	1,279
15	Georgia Bulldogs	1,273
16	Louisville Cardinals	1,259
17	Kentucky Wildcats	1,233
18	Florida State Seminoles	1,187
19	Santa Clara Broncos	1,161
20	West Virginia Mountaineers	1,149
21	Nebraska Cornhuskers	1,064
22	Washington State Cougars	1,052
23	Washington Huskies	1,048
24	North Carolina Tar Heels	1,006
25	Texas Longhorns	998
26	Long Beach State	991
27	Notre Dame Fighting Irish	973
28	Saint Louis Billikens	955
29	Colorado Buffaloes	954
30	Texas Tech Red Raiders	903
31	Charlotte 49ers	898
32	Kansas Jayhawks	895
33	Florida Gators	887
34	Grand Canyon Antelopes	870
35	Utah Valley Wolverines	846
36	Idaho Vandals	843
37	Minnesota Golden Gophers	824
38	Michigan State Spartans	817
39	Michigan Wolverines	809
40	New Mexico Lobos	784

== See also ==
- College soccer
- List of NCAA Division I women's soccer programs
- 2017 in American soccer
- 2017 NCAA Division I Women's Soccer Tournament
- 2017 NCAA Division I men's soccer season
