= 2017 SMU Mustangs women's soccer team =

American college soccer season

2017 SMU Mustangs women's soccer
- Conference: American Athletic Conference
- Record: 10–7–3 (4–4–1 American)
- Head coach: Chris Petrucelli (6th season)
- Assistant coaches: Nicole Nelson (6th season); Mat Cosgriff (4th season)
- Home stadium: Westcott Field

2017 American Athletic Conference women's soccer standings
	Conf.						Overall
Team	W		L		T	PCT	W		L		T	PCT
No. 17 UCF ‍†‍‍^{y}	7	–	0	–	2	.889	13	–	2	–	3	.806
South Florida ‡^{y} ‍‍‍	7	–	1	–	1	.833	13	–	4	–	2	.737
Cincinnati ‍‍‍	5	–	2	–	2	.667	12	–	4	–	3	.711
Memphis ‍‍‍	4	–	2	–	3	.611	11	–	6	–	3	.625
Connecticut ‍‍‍	5	–	4	–	0	.556	7	–	9	–	3	.447
SMU ‍‍‍	4	–	4	–	1	.500	10	–	7	–	3	.575
Houston ‍‍‍	3	–	6	–	0	.333	7	–	9	–	1	.441
Temple ‍‍‍	2	–	6	–	1	.278	6	–	10	–	2	.389
Tulsa ‍‍‍	1	–	6	–	2	.222	3	–	12	–	4	.263
East Carolina ‍‍‍	1	–	8	–	0	.111	6	–	10	–	2	.389
† – Conference champion ‡ – 2017 AAC Tournament champion y – Invited to the NCAA Tournament; As of November 17, 2017; Rankings from United Soccer Coaches Poll; Source:American Athletic Conference

The 2017 SMU Mustangs women's soccer team represented Southern Methodist University during the 2017 NCAA Division I women's soccer season. The regular season began on August 18 and concluded on October 26. It was the program's 24th season fielding a women's varsity soccer team, and their 5th season in the AAC. The 2017 season was Chris Petrucelli's sixth year as head coach for the program.

== Roster ==
As of November 3, 2017

Note: Flags indicate national team as defined under FIFA eligibility rules; some limited exceptions apply. Players may hold more than one non-FIFA nationality.

No.	Pos.	Nation	Player
0	GK	(United States) USA	Brooke Kuempel
1	GK	(United States) USA	Catie Brown
2	DF	(Canada) CAN	Katharine Herron
3	MF	(United States) USA	Katia Novi
4	MF	(United States) USA	Hailey Bishop
5	MF	(United States) USA	Emily Cope
6	DF	(United States) USA	Ale Winn
7	DF	(United States) USA	Mary Meehan
8	FW	(United States) USA	Lauren Guerra
9	FW	(United States) USA	Robyn Maurer
10	FW	(United States) USA	Blair Thorpe
11	DF	(United States) USA	Haley Thompson

No.	Pos.	Nation	Player
12	MF	(Canada) CAN	Hannah Fleet
13	MF	(Canada) CAN	Isabelle Nashmi
14	FW	(United States) USA	Hannah Allred
15	FW	(United States) USA	Vanessa Valadez
16	MF	(United States) USA	Lauren Harrington
18	MF	(United States) USA	Claire Oates
20	FW	(United States) USA	Allie Thornton
22	MF	(United States) USA	Katina Tsapos
23	DF	(United States) USA	Jessica Cooley
26	DF	(United States) USA	Sophie Adler
45	GK	(United States) USA	Haley Jackson

== Schedule ==
Date Time, TV	Rank^{#}	Opponent^{#}	Result	Record	Site City, State
Non-conference regular season
August 18*; 7:00 p.m.		No. 17 Arkansas	W 1–0 ^{OT}	1–0–0	Westcott Field; Dallas, TX
August 20*; 7:00 p.m.		No. 16 Oklahoma	T 0–0 ^{2OT}	1–0–1	Westcott Field; Dallas, TX
August 24*; 9:00 p.m.		at Gonzaga	T 1–1 ^{2OT}	1–0–2	Luger Field; Spokane, WA
August 27*; 2:30 p.m.		at Washington	W 2–1 ^{OT}	2–0–2	Husky Soccer Stadium; Seattle, WA
August 31*; 7:00 p.m.	No. 22	Sam Houston State	W 4–1	3–0–2	Westcott Field; Dallas, TX
September 8*; 7:00 p.m.	No. 23	Indiana	L 0–1	3–1–2	Westcott Field; Dallas, TX
September 14*; 7:00 p.m.		TCU	W 1–0	4–1–2	Westcott Field; Dallas, TX
September 17*; 8:30 p.m.		Baylor	L 1–4	4–2–2	Westcott Field; Dallas, TX
American Athletic Conference regular season
September 21; 7:00 p.m.		at Memphis	T 3–3 ^{2OT}	4–2–3 (0–0–1)	Mike Rose Soccer Complex; Memphis, TN
September 24; 1:00 p.m.		at Tulsa	L 2–3 ^{OT}	4–3–3 (0–1–1)	Hurricane Soccer & Track Stadium; Tulsa, OK
September 29*; 5:00 p.m.		New Mexico State	W 2–1	5–3–3	Westcott Field; Dallas, TX
October 5; 7:00 p.m.		South Florida	L 2–3	5–4–3 (0–2–1)	Westcott Field; Dallas, TX
October 8; 1:00 p.m.		No. 10 UCF	L 0–4	5–5–3 (0–3–1)	Westcott Field; Dallas, TX
October 12; 6:00 p.m.		at UConn	L 1–2	5–6–3 (0–4–1)	Morrone Stadium; Storrs, CT
October 15; 12:00 p.m.		at Temple	W 2–0	6–6–3 (1–4–1)	Temple Sports Complex; Philadelphia, PA
October 19; 7:00 p.m.		East Carolina	W 1–0	7–6–3 (2–4–1)	Westcott Field; Dallas, TX
October 22; 1:00 p.m.		No. 21 Cincinnati	W 1–0	8–6–3 (3–4–1)	Westcott Field; Dallas, TX
October 26; 7:00 p.m.		Houston	W 1–0	9–6–3 (4–4–1)	Westcott Field; Dallas, TX
American Athletic Conference Tournament
November 1; 3:30 p.m.	(6)	vs. (3) Cincinnati; First Round	W 1–0	10–6–3	UCF Soccer and Track Stadium; Orlando, FL
November 3; 3:30 p.m.	(6)	vs. (2) South Florida; Semifinals	L 0–1	10–7–3	UCF Soccer and Track Stadium; Orlando, FL
*Non-conference game. ^{#}Rankings from United Soccer Coaches. (#) Tournament seedings in parentheses. All times are in Central Time.
