= 2017 SEC women's soccer tournament =

- Classification: Division I
- Teams: 10
- Matches: 9
- Site: Orange Beach Sportsplex; Orange Beach, Alabama
- Champions: Texas A&M (3rd title)
- Winning coach: G Guerrieri (3rd title)
- MVP: Mikaela Harvey (Texas A&M)
- Broadcast: SEC Network

2017 SEC women's soccer standings
	Conf.						Overall
Team	W		L		T	PCT	W		L		T	PCT
#4 South Carolina †^{y} ‍‍‍	9	–	0	–	1	.950	19	–	3	–	1	.848
No. 12 Texas A&M ‍‍‡‍^{y}	9	–	1	–	0	.900	18	–	2	–	2	.864
No. 6 Florida ‍‍‍^{y}	7	–	3	–	0	.700	17	–	7	–	0	.708
Vanderbilt ‍‍‍^{y}	6	–	3	–	1	.650	13	–	7	–	2	.636
No. 25 Tennessee ‍‍‍^{y}	6	–	3	–	1	.650	15	–	4	–	2	.762
Auburn ‍‍‍^{y}	4	–	2	–	4	.600	8	–	7	–	5	.525
Arkansas ‍‍‍^{y}	4	–	5	–	1	.450	11	–	11	–	2	.500
Alabama ‍‍‍^{y}	4	–	5	–	1	.450	12	–	8	–	1	.595
Ole Miss ‍‍‍^{y}	3	–	5	–	2	.400	10	–	7	–	3	.575
Missouri ‍‍‍	3	–	7	–	0	.300	8	–	12	–	1	.405
Kentucky ‍‍‍	3	–	7	–	0	.300	8	–	12	–	0	.400
Mississippi State ‍‍‍	2	–	5	–	3	.350	8	–	5	–	4	.588
LSU ‍‍‍	1	–	6	–	3	.250	8	–	7	–	3	.528
Georgia ‍‍‍	0	–	9	–	1	.050	4	–	12	–	2	.278
† – Conference champion ‡ – 2017 SEC Tournament champion y – Invited to the NCAA tournament As of December 1, 2017; Rankings from United Soccer Coaches Poll; Source:SEC

The 2017 SEC women's soccer tournament was the postseason women's soccer tournament for the SEC. The Florida Gators were the defending champions, but they were eliminated from the 2017 tournament with a 2–1 overtime loss to the Texas A&M Aggies in the semifinals. Texas A&M won the tournament title with a 2–1 win over the Arkansas Razorbacks in the final. This was the third SEC women's soccer tournament title for Texas A&M, all of which have come under the direction of head coach G Guerrieri.

== Qualification ==
The top ten teams earned a berth into the SEC Tournament. The tournament is held at Orange Beach Sportsplex in Orange Beach, Alabama. Four of the ten teams in the tournament were ranked in the United Soccer Coaches poll prior to the beginning of the tournament.

== Bracket ==
First round Sunday, October 29
8	Arkansas	1
9	Ole Miss	0
7	Alabama	1
10	Missouri	3

Quarterfinals; Tuesday, October 31
1	South Carolina	0
8	Arkansas	1
4	Vanderbilt	1
5	Tennessee	0
2	Texas A&M	7
10	Missouri	1
3	Florida	1
6	Auburn	0

Semifinals; Thursday, November 2
8	Arkansas	1 (4)
4	Vanderbilt	1 (2)
2	Texas A&M	2^{OT}
3	Florida	1

Championship; Sunday, November 5
8	Arkansas	1
2	Texas A&M	2

== Schedule ==
All matches are played at Orange Beach Sportsplex in Orange Beach, Alabama.

=== First round ===
October 29, 2017	#7 Alabama	1–3	#10 Missouri	Orange Beach, Alabama
1:00 p.m. CDT	Celia Jiménez 73'	Report	1' Savannah Trujillo; 27' Sarah Luebbert; 57' Grace Kitts	Stadium: Orange Beach Sportsplex; Referee: Aaron Hernandez; Assistant referees: Craig Lowry; Brooke Mayo; Fourth official: Gus St. Silva

October 29, 2017	#8 Arkansas	1–0	#9 Ole Miss	Orange Beach, Alabama
3:30 p.m. CDT	Taylor Malham 32'	Report		Stadium: Orange Beach Sportsplex; Referee: Jonathan Weiner; Assistant referees: Alicia Messer; Jon Skinner; Fourth official: Gus St. Silva

=== Quarterfinals ===
October 31, 2017	#2 Texas A&M	7–1	#10 Missouri	Orange Beach, Alabama
12:00 p.m. CDT	Ally Watt 4', 12', 20', 47'; Jimena López 39' (pen.); Stephanie Malherbe 56'; Claudette Lassandro 76'	Report	27' Jessica Johnson	Stadium: Orange Beach Sportsplex; Referee: Lance Vanhaitsma; Assistant referees: Alicia Messer; Craig Lowry; Fourth official: Gus St. Silva

October 31, 2017	#3 Florida	1–0	#6 Auburn	Orange Beach, Alabama
2:30 p.m. CDT	Lais Araujo 31'	Report		Stadium: Orange Beach Sportsplex; Referee: Jonathan Weiner; Assistant referees: Brooke Mayo; Tiffini Turpin; Fourth official: Aaron Hernandez

October 31, 2017	#1 South Carolina	0–1	#8 Arkansas	Orange Beach, Alabama
5:00 p.m. CDT		Report	53' Tori Cannata	Stadium: Orange Beach Sportsplex; Referee: Ceciah Valero; Assistant referees: Craig Lowry; Alicia Messer; Fourth official: Gus St. Silva

October 31, 2017	#4 Vanderbilt	1–0	#5 Tennessee	Orange Beach, Alabama
7:30 p.m. CDT	Stephanie Amack 50' (pen.)	Report		Stadium: Orange Beach Sportsplex; Referee: Elvis Mahmutovic; Assistant referees: Jon Skinner; Brooke Mayo; Fourth official: Gus St. Silva

=== Semifinals ===
November 2, 2017	#8 Arkansas	1–1 (a.e.t.) (4–2 p)	#4 Vanderbilt	Orange Beach, Alabama
3:30 p.m. CDT	Kayla McKeon 22'	Report	41' Paola Ellis	Stadium: Orange Beach Sportsplex; Referee: Corey Rockwell; Assistant referees: Jon Skinner; Natalie Simon; Fourth official: Gus St. Silva
	Penalties
	Jessi Hartzler (penalty scored); Taylor Malham (penalty scored); Nayeli Perez (penalty scored); Parker Goins (penalty scored)		(penalty missed) Kaylann Boyd; (penalty missed) Stephanie Amack; (penalty scored) Cristina De Zeeuw; (penalty scored) Lydia Simmons

November 2, 2017	#2 Texas A&M	2–1 (a.e.t.)	#3 Florida	Orange Beach, Alabama
6:00 p.m. CDT	Rheagen Smith 69'; Sara Wilson 97' (o.g.)	Report	30' Sarah Troccoli	Stadium: Orange Beach Sportsplex; Referee: Ceciah Valero; Assistant referees: Craig Lowry; Tiffini Turpin; Fourth official: Gus St. Silva

=== Final ===
November 5, 2017	#8 Arkansas	1–2	#2 Texas A&M	Orange Beach, Alabama
2:00 p.m. CST	Parker Goins 81'	Report	38' (o.g.) Tori Cannata; 88' Emily Bates	Stadium: Orange Beach Sportsplex; Attendance: 802; Referee: Amber O'Connor; Assistant referees: Natalie Simon; Tiffini Turpin; Fourth official: Ceciah Valero

== Statistics ==
=== Goalscorers ===
There were 24 goals scored in 9 matches, for an average of 2.67 goals per match.

4 goals

- Ally Watt – Texas A&M

1 goal

- Celia Jiménez – Alabama
- Tori Cannata – Arkansas
- Parker Goins – Arkansas
- Taylor Malham – Arkansas
- Kayla McKeon – Arkansas
- Lais Araujo – Florida
- Sara Troccoli – Florida
- Jessica Johnson – Missouri
- Grace Kitts – Missouri
- Sarah Luebbert – Missouri
- Savannah Trujillo – Missouri
- Emily Bates – Texas A&M
- Claudette Lassandro – Texas A&M
- Jimena López – Texas A&M
- Stephanie Malherbe – Texas A&M
- Rheagen Smith – Texas A&M
- Stephanie Amack – Vanderbilt
- Paola Ellis – Vanderbilt

1 own goal

- Tori Cannata – Arkansas (against Texas A&M)
- Sara Wilson – Florida (against Texas A&M)

== All-Tournament team ==
Player	Team
Jordan Harris	Arkansas
Taylor Malham	Arkansas
Haley VanFossen	Arkansas
Kaylan Marckese	Florida
Parker Roberts	Florida
**Mikaela Harvey**	Texas A&M
Stephanie Malherbe	Texas A&M
Kendall Ritchie	Texas A&M
Ally Watt	Texas A&M
Stephanie Amack	Vanderbilt
Myra Konte	Vanderbilt

MVP in bold

== See also ==
- Southeastern Conference
- 2017 NCAA Division I women's soccer season
- 2017 NCAA Division I Women's Soccer Tournament
