= 2017 Big South Conference women's soccer tournament =

- Classification: Division I
- Teams: 8
- Matches: 7
- Attendance: 2,674
- Site: Bryan Park; Greensboro, North Carolina (Semifinals and Final)
- Champions: High Point (6th title)
- Winning coach: Marty Beall (4th title)

2017 Big South Conference women's soccer standings
	Conf.						Overall
Team	W		L		T	PCT	W		L		T	PCT
High Point ‍†‍‡‍^{y}	7	–	1	–	1	.833	13	–	8	–	1	.614
Liberty ‍†‍‍	7	–	1	–	1	.833	10	–	7	–	3	.575
Longwood ‍‍‍	6	–	1	–	2	.778	13	–	5	–	3	.690
Campbell ‍‍‍	5	–	2	–	2	.667	10	–	7	–	2	.579
Radford ‍‍‍	4	–	5	–	0	.444	11	–	7	–	0	.611
Charleston Southern ‍‍‍	3	–	5	–	1	.389	5	–	11	–	2	.333
Gardner–Webb ‍‍‍	2	–	4	–	3	.389	4	–	12	–	3	.289
Winthrop ‍‍‍	2	–	6	–	1	.278	5	–	10	–	2	.353
UNC Asheville ‍‍‍	2	–	6	–	1	.278	6	–	10	–	2	.389
Presbyterian ‍‍‍	1	–	8	–	0	.111	3	–	13	–	0	.188
† – Conference champion ‡ – 2017 Big South Tournament champion y – Invited to the NCAA tournament As of November 11, 2017; Rankings from United Soccer Coaches Poll; Source:Big South Conference

The 2017 Big South Conference women's soccer tournament was the postseason women's soccer tournament for the Big South Conference held from October 27 through November 5, 2017. The quarterfinals of the tournament were held at campus sites, while the semifinals and final took place at Bryan Park in Greensboro, North Carolina. The eight-team single-elimination tournament consisted of three rounds based on seeding from regular season conference play. The Liberty Flames were the defending champions, but they were eliminated from the 2017 tournament with a 2–0 semifinal loss to the Longwood Lancers. The High Point Panthers won the tournament with a 1–0 win over Longwood in the final. The conference tournament title was the sixth for the High Point women's soccer program and the fourth for head coach Marty Beall.

== Bracket ==
Quarterfinals; October 27–28
1	High Point	2
8	Winthrop	0
4	Campbell	2
5	Radford	0
2	Liberty	2^{2OT}
7	Gardner–Webb	1
3	Longwood	3
6	Charleston Southern	0

Semifinals; November 3
1	High Point	3
4	Campbell	1
2	Liberty	0
3	Longwood	2

Final; November 5
1	High Point	1
3	Longwood	0

== Schedule ==
=== Quarterfinals ===
October 27, 2017	#2 Liberty	2–1 (a.e.t.)	#7 Gardner–Webb	Lynchburg, Virginia
5:30 p.m. EDT	Devon Jones 25'; Sarah Erickson 104'	Report	59' Annie Ross	Stadium: Osborne Stadium; Attendance: 378; Referee: Jordan Davis; Assistant referees: Michael Decker; Brandon Marion; Fourth official: Hudson Owens

October 27, 2017	#1 High Point	2–0	#8 Winthrop	High Point, North Carolina
7:00 p.m. EDT	Paige Rombach 44' (pen.); Michele Micciche 86'	Report		Stadium: Vert Stadium; Attendance: 551; Referee: Daniel Burak; Assistant referees: Doug Hartemann; Derek View; Fourth official: Justin Howard

October 27, 2017	#3 Longwood	3–0	#6 Charleston Southern	Farmville, Virginia
7:00 p.m. EDT	Kelly Almeida 35'; Teresa Fruchterman 47'; Sydney Wallace 74'	Report		Stadium: Athletics Complex; Attendance: 518; Referee: Kevin Uitto; Assistant referees: Kiah Haslett; Aaron Hormuth; Fourth official: Heath Hixson

October 28, 2017	#4 Campbell	2–0	#5 Radford	Buies Creek, North Carolina
7:00 p.m. EDT	Shelby Denkert 2'; Shannon Wratchford 55'	Report		Stadium: Eakes Athletic Complex; Attendance: 327; Referee: Robert Dail; Assistant referees: Matthew Katsuleris; Derek View; Fourth official: Thomas Brigman

=== Semifinals ===
November 3, 2017	#1 High Point	3–1	#4 Campbell	Greensboro, North Carolina
4:00 p.m. EDT	Meredith Dunker 32'; Aley McKinley 44'; Bri Jean-Charles 53'	Report	64' Anna Brantley	Stadium: Bryan Park; Attendance: 275; Referee: Aaron Gallagher; Assistant referees: Jordan Davis; Scott Bowers; Fourth official: Eric Varone

November 3, 2017	#2 Liberty	0–2	#3 Longwood	Greensboro, North Carolina
7:00 p.m. EDT		Report	71' Emilie Kupsov; 81' Emily Mothersbaugh	Stadium: Bryan Park; Attendance: 225; Referee: Eric Usher; Assistant referees: Kiah Haslett; Jeremy L.B. Smith; Fourth official: Eric Varone

=== Final ===
November 5, 2017	#1 High Point	1–0	#3 Longwood	Greensboro, North Carolina
2:00 p.m. EST	Meredith Dunker 39'	Report		Stadium: Bryan Park; Attendance: 400; Referee: Jude Carr; Assistant referees: Kelly Terry; Robert Velbas; Fourth official: Kevin Uitto

== Statistics ==
=== Goalscorers ===
2 Goals

- Meredith Dunker - High Point

1 Goal

- Kelly Almedia - Longwood
- Anna Brantley - Campbell
- Bri Jean-Charles - High Point
- Shelby Denkert - Campbell
- Sarah Erickson - Liberty
- Teresa Fruchterman - Longwood
- Devon Jones - Liberty
- Emilie Kupsov - Longwood
- Aley McKinley - High Point
- Michele Micciche - High Point
- Emily Mothersbaugh - Longwood
- Paige Rombach - High Point
- Annie Ross - Gardner–Webb
- Sydney Wallace - Longwood
- Shannon Wratchford - Campbell

== See also ==
- Big South Conference
- 2017 NCAA Division I women's soccer season
- 2017 NCAA Division I Women's Soccer Tournament
- 2017 Big South Conference Men's Soccer Tournament
