= 2017 Big West Conference women's soccer tournament =

Women's Soccer Tournament

- Classification: Division I
- Teams: 4
- Matches: 3
- Attendance: 1,321
- Site: Matador Soccer Field; Northridge, California
- Champions: Cal State Fullerton (7th title)
- Winning coach: Demian Brown (5th title)

2017 Big West Conference women's soccer standings
	Conf.						Overall
Team	W		L		T	PCT	W		L		T	PCT
UC Irvine ‍†‍‍	5	–	2	–	1	.688	10	–	6	–	4	.600
Cal State Northridge ‍‍‍	4	–	1	–	3	.688	9	–	4	–	8	.619
UC Riverside ‍‍‍	5	–	3	–	0	.625	8	–	11	–	2	.429
Cal State Fullerton ‡^{y} ‍‍‍	4	–	3	–	1	.563	12	–	6	–	4	.636
Long Beach State ‍‍‍	3	–	3	–	2	.500	9	–	6	–	3	.583
UC Davis ‍‍‍	3	–	3	–	2	.500	4	–	12	–	2	.278
UC Santa Barbara ‍‍‍	2	–	4	–	2	.375	6	–	8	–	5	.447
Cal Poly ‍‍‍	2	–	4	–	2	.375	7	–	9	–	3	.447
Hawaii ‍‍‍	1	–	6	–	1	.188	6	–	10	–	1	.382
† – Conference champion ‡ – 2017 Big West Tournament champion y – Invited to the NCAA tournament As of November 11, 2017; Rankings from United Soccer Coaches Poll; Source:The Big West Conference

The 2017 Big West Conference women's soccer tournament was the postseason women's soccer tournament for the Big West Conference held on November 2 and 5, 2017. The three-match tournament took place at Matador Soccer Field in Northridge, California. The four-team single-elimination tournament consisted of two rounds based on seeding from regular season conference play. The defending champions were the Long Beach State 49ers, but they failed to qualify for the 2017 tournament. The Cal State Fullerton Titans won the title by virtue of winning the penalty shoot-out tiebreaking procedure following a tie with the Cal State Northridge Matadors in the final. This was the seventh Big West tournament title for the Cal State Fullerton program and the fifth for head coach Demian Brown.

== Bracket ==
Semifinals; Thursday, November 2
1	UC Irvine	1
4	Cal State Fullerton	2
2	Cal State Northridge	3
3	UC Riverside	0

Final; Sunday, November 5
4	Cal State Fullerton	1 (4)
2	Cal State Northridge	1 (3)

== Schedule ==
=== Semifinals ===
November 2, 2017	#1 UC Irvine	1–2	#4 Cal State Fullerton	Northridge, California
5:00 p.m. PDT	Sydney Carr 83'	Report	31' Kaycee Hoover; 56' Maribell Morales	Stadium: Matador Soccer Field; Referee: Salma Perez; Assistant referees: Samantha Martinez; Jonathan Kaminski; Fourth official: Michelle Provan

November 2, 2017	#2 Cal State Northridge	3–0	#3 UC Riverside	Northridge, California
7:30 p.m. PDT	Cynthia Sanchez 57', 85'; Lindsay Kutscher 80'	Report		Stadium: Matador Soccer Field; Attendance: 662; Referee: Cameron Blanchard; Assistant referees: Melissa Gonzalez; Michelle Provan; Fourth official: Samantha Martinez

=== Final ===
November 5, 2017	#4 Cal State Fullerton	1–1 (a.e.t.) (4–3 p)	#2 Cal State Northridge	Northridge, California
1:00 p.m. PST	Nano Oronoz 56'	Report	80' Marissa Favela	Stadium: Matador Soccer Field; Attendance: 659; Referee: Christopher Calderon; Assistant referees: Kristin Patterson; Jenny Diep; Fourth official: Jaclyn Reilman
	Penalties
	Samantha Koemans (penalty scored); Sarah Fajnor (penalty missed); Connie Caliz (penalty scored); Tala Haddad (penalty scored); Kaycee Hoover (penalty scored)		(penalty scored) Bret Guarino; (penalty missed) Lindsay Kutscher; (penalty scored) Katelyn Von Meter; (penalty missed) Marissa Favela; (penalty scored) Christina Nixon

== Statistics ==
=== Goalscorers ===
2 Goals

- Cynthia Sanchez - Cal State Northridge

1 Goal

- Sydney Carr - UC Irvine
- Marissa Favela - Cal State Northridge
- Lindsay Kutscher - Cal State Northridge
- Kaycee Hoover - Cal State Fullerton
- Maribell Morales - Cal State Fullerton
- Nano Oronoz - Cal State Fullerton

== See also ==
- Big West Conference
- 2017 NCAA Division I women's soccer season
- 2017 NCAA Division I Women's Soccer Tournament
- 2017 Big West Conference Men's Soccer Tournament
