= 2017 Big 12 Conference women's soccer tournament =

- Classification: Division I
- Teams: 8
- Matches: 7
- Attendance: 2,279
- Site: Swope Soccer Village; Kansas City, Missouri
- Champions: Baylor (2nd title)
- Winning coach: Paul Jobson (1st title)
- Broadcast: Big 12 Digital Network (Quarterfinals and Semifinals); Fox Sports 1 (Final)

2017 Big 12 Conference women's soccer standings
	Conf.						Overall
Team	W		L		T	PCT	W		L		T	PCT
No. 17 Oklahoma State ‍†‍‍^{y}	8	–	1	–	0	.889	17	–	4	–	3	.771
No. 7 West Virginia ‍‍‍^{y}	7	–	1	–	1	.833	16	–	4	–	3	.761
TCU ‍‍‍^{y}	6	–	2	–	1	.722	12	–	7	–	3	.614
No. 18 Texas ‍‍‍^{y}	5	–	2	–	2	.667	14	–	4	–	3	.738
No. 23 Baylor ‍‍‡‍^{y}	4	–	4	–	1	.500	15	–	5	–	3	.717
Kansas ‍‍‍	3	–	5	–	1	.389	8	–	9	–	3	.475
Texas Tech ‍‍‍	2	–	4	–	3	.389	9	–	7	–	3	.553
Oklahoma ‍‍‍	1	–	5	–	3	.278	3	–	13	–	4	.250
Iowa State ‍‍‍	1	–	6	–	2	.222	3	–	12	–	3	.250
Kansas State ‍‍‍	1	–	8	–	0	.111	6	–	11	–	1	.361
† – Conference champion ‡ – Tournament champion y – Invited to the NCAA tournament Rankings from United Soccer Coaches

The 2017 Big 12 Conference women's soccer tournament was the postseason women's soccer tournament for the Big 12 Conference held from November 1–5, 2017. The seven-match tournament took place at the Swope Soccer Village in Kansas City, Missouri. The eight-team single-elimination tournament consisted of three rounds based on seeding from regular season conference play. The West Virginia Mountaineers were the defending champions, but they were eliminated from the 2017 tournament by virtue of losing the penalty shoot-out tiebreaking procedure following a tie with the TCU Horned Frogs in the semifinals. The Baylor Bears won the title, defeating TCU 2–1 in overtime in the final. This was the second Big 12 tournament title for the Baylor women's soccer program and first for head coach Paul Jobson.

== Regular season standings ==
Place	Seed	Team	Conference					Overall			
Place	Seed	Team	W	L	T	%	Pts	W	L	T	%
1	1	Oklahoma State	8	1	0	.889	24	17	4	3	.771
2	2	West Virginia	7	1	1	.833	22	16	4	3	.761
3	3	TCU	6	2	1	.722	19	12	7	3	.614
4	4	Texas	5	2	2	.667	17	14	4	3	.738
5	5	Baylor	4	4	1	.500	13	15	5	3	.717
6	6	Kansas	3	5	1	.389	10	8	9	3	.475
7	7	Texas Tech	2	4	3	.389	9	9	7	3	.553
8	8	Oklahoma	1	5	3	.278	6	3	13	4	.250
9		Iowa State	1	6	2	.222	5	3	12	3	.250
10		Kansas State	1	8	0	.111	3	6	11	1	.361

== Bracket ==
Quarterfinals; Wednesday, Nov. 1
1	Oklahoma State	2
8	Oklahoma	1
4	Texas	1
5	Baylor	2^{OT}
2	West Virginia	3
7	Texas Tech	1
3	TCU	1 (4)
6	Kansas	1 (2)

Semifinals; Friday, Nov. 3
1	Oklahoma State	0
5	Baylor	3
2	West Virginia	1 (3)
3	TCU	1 (5)

Final; Sunday, Nov. 5
5	Baylor	2^{OT}
3	TCU	1

== Schedule ==
=== Quarterfinals ===
November 1, 2017	#1 Oklahoma State	2–1	#8 Oklahoma	Kansas City, Missouri
11:30 a.m. CDT	Haley Woodard 23'; Coumba Sow 36'	Report	47' Madeline Brem	Stadium: Swope Soccer Village; Attendance: 174; Referee: Mike Lavergne; Assistant referees: Jose Da Silva; Jamie Willis; Fourth official: Richonne Clark

November 1, 2017	#4 Texas	1–2 (a.e.t.)	#5 Baylor	Kansas City, Missouri
2:00 p.m. CDT	Katie Glenn 72'	Report	88' Lauren Piercy; 99' Julie James	Stadium: Swope Soccer Village; Attendance: 210; Referee: Richonne Clark; Assistant referees: Chris Strickland; Jeff Greeson; Fourth official: Rubiel Vazquez

November 1, 2017	#2 West Virginia	3–1	#7 Texas Tech	Kansas City, Missouri
5:30 p.m. CDT	Alli Magaletta 16'; Heather Kaleiohi 68'; Michaela Abam 83'	Report	28' Mary Heiberger	Stadium: Swope Soccer Village; Attendance: 235; Referee: Rubiel Vazquez; Assistant referees: Jose Da Silva; Lorant Varga; Fourth official: Lance Vanhaitsma

November 1, 2017	#3 TCU	1–1 (a.e.t.) (4–2 p)	#6 Kansas	Kansas City, Missouri
8:00 p.m. CDT	Kayla Hill 79'	Report	62' Katie McClure	Stadium: Swope Soccer Village; Attendance: 316; Referee: Lance Vanhaitsma; Assistant referees: Jeff Greeson; Emily Fletcher; Fourth official: Shane Butler
	Penalties
	Kayla Hill (penalty scored); Ryan Williams (penalty scored); Yazmeen Ryan (penalty scored); Allison Ganter (penalty scored)		(penalty missed) Grace Hagan; (penalty scored) Ceri Holland; (penalty scored) Madison Meador; (penalty missed) Kayla Morrison

=== Semifinals ===
November 3, 2017	#1 Oklahoma State	0–3	#5 Baylor	Kansas City, Missouri
4:30 p.m. CDT		Report	10', 89' De Lima; 76' Ariel Leach	Stadium: Swope Soccer Village; Attendance: 388; Referee: Rubiel Vazquez; Assistant referees: Jeff Greeson; Lorant Varga; Fourth official: Shane Butler

November 3, 2017	#2 West Virginia	1–1 (a.e.t.) (3–5 p)	#3 TCU	Kansas City, Missouri
7:00 p.m. CDT	Amandine Pierre-Louis 77'	Report	52' Allison Ganter	Stadium: Swope Soccer Village; Attendance: 404; Referee: Mike Lavergne; Assistant referees: Chris Strickland; Jamie Willis; Fourth official: Richonne Clark
	Penalties
	Carla Portillo (penalty scored); Michaela Abam (penalty scored); Vanessa Flores (penalty missed); Amandine Pierre-Louis (penalty scored)		(penalty scored) Tijana Djuricek; (penalty scored) Kayla Hill; (penalty scored) Yazmeen Ryan; (penalty scored) Allison Ganter; (penalty scored) Ryan Williams

=== Final ===
November 5, 2017	#5 Baylor	2–1 (a.e.t.)	#3 TCU	Kansas City, Missouri
3:00 p.m. CST	Kennedy Brown 69'; Lauren Piercy 94'	Report	87' (pen.) Ryan Williams	Stadium: Swope Soccer Village; Attendance: 552; Referee: Guido Gonzales; Assistant referees: Chris Strickland; Emily Fletcher; Fourth official: Rubiel Vazquez

== Statistics ==
=== Goalscorers ===
2 Goals

- Aline De Lima – Baylor
- Lauren Piercy – Baylor

1 Goal

- Michaela Abam – West Virginia
- Madeline Brem – Oklahoma
- Kennedy Brown – Baylor
- Allison Ganter – TCU
- Katie Glenn – Texas
- Mary Heiberger – Texas Tech
- Kayla Hill – TCU
- Julie James – Baylor
- Heather Kaleiohi – West Virginia
- Ariel Leach – Baylor
- Alli Magaletta – West Virginia
- Katie McClure – Kansas
- Amandine Pierre-Louis – West Virginia
- Coumba Sow – Oklahoma State
- Ryan Williams – TCU
- Haley Woodward – Oklahoma State

== Awards ==
=== Most valuable player ===
- Offensive MVP – Aline de Lima – Baylor, Lima
- Defensive MVP – Katie Lund – TCU

=== All-Tournament team ===
Position	Player	Team
GK	Katie Lund	TCU
D	Precious Akanyirige	Baylor
D	Sarah King	Baylor
D	Ryan Williams	TCU
D	Amandine Pierre-Louis	West Virginia
MF	Aline de Lima	Baylor
MF	Julie James	Baylor
MF	Kayla Hill	TCU
F	Lauren Piercy	Baylor
F	Allison Ganter	TCU, Sr
F	Michaela Abam	West Virginia
