= 2017 Ohio Valley Conference women's soccer tournament =

- Classification: Division I
- Teams: 8
- Matches: 7
- Attendance: 2,108
- Site: Cutchin Field; Murray, Kentucky (Semifinals & Final)
- Champions: Murray State (3rd title)
- Winning coach: Jeremy Groves (2nd title)
- Broadcast: OVC Digital Network

2017 Ohio Valley Conference women's soccer standings
	Conf.						Overall
Team	W		L		T	PCT	W		L		T	PCT
Murray State ‍†‍‡‍^{y}	8	–	0	–	2	.900	15	–	2	–	2	.842
Tennessee Tech ‍‍‍	6	–	1	–	3	.750	9	–	5	–	3	.618
Eastern Kentucky ‍‍‍	6	–	1	–	3	.750	11	–	5	–	4	.650
Belmont ‍‍‍	6	–	4	–	0	.600	10	–	6	–	2	.611
Southeast Missouri ‍‍‍	4	–	3	–	3	.550	8	–	8	–	4	.500
UT Martin ‍‍‍	4	–	5	–	1	.450	6	–	11	–	3	.375
SIU Edwardsville ‍‍‍	4	–	5	–	1	.450	7	–	10	–	2	.421
Austin Peay ‍‍‍	3	–	4	–	3	.450	8	–	7	–	3	.528
Jacksonville State ‍‍‍	3	–	7	–	0	.300	6	–	10	–	2	.389
Morehead State ‍‍‍	2	–	7	–	1	.250	3	–	13	–	1	.206
Eastern Illinois ‍‍‍	0	–	9	–	1	.050	5	–	12	–	2	.316
† – Conference champion ‡ – 2017 OVC Tournament champion y – Invited to the NCAA tournament As of November 11, 2017; Rankings from United Soccer Coaches Poll; Source:Ohio Valley Conference

The 2017 Ohio Valley Conference women's soccer tournament was the postseason women's soccer tournament for the Ohio Valley Conference held from October 27 through November 5, 2017. The first round and quarterfinals of the tournament were held at campus sites hosted by the #3 and #4 seeds, while the semifinals and final took place at Cutchin Field in Murray, Kentucky. The eight-team single-elimination tournament consisted of four rounds based on seeding from regular season conference play. The SIU Edwardsville Cougars were the defending champions, but they were eliminated from the 2017 tournament with a 2–1 quarterfinal loss to the Eastern Kentucky Colonels. The Murray State Racers won the tournament with a 1–0 overtime win over Eastern Kentucky in the final. The conference tournament title was the third for the Murray State women's soccer program and the second for head coach Jeremy Groves.

== Bracket ==
First round Friday, Oct. 27
5	Southeast Missouri	2
8	Austin Peay	1
6	UT Martin	1
7	SIU Edwardsville	2

Quarterfinals; Sunday, Oct. 29
4	Belmont	0 (4)
5	Southeast Missouri	0 (5)
3	Eastern Kentucky	2
7	SIU Edwardsville	1

Semifinals; Friday, Nov. 3
1	Murray State	1
5	Southeast Missouri	0
2	Tennessee Tech	0
3	Eastern Kentucky	1^{OT}

Final; Sunday, Nov. 5
1	Murray State	1^{OT}
3	Eastern Kentucky	0

== Schedule ==
=== First Round ===
October 27, 2017	#6 UT Martin	1–2	#7 SIU Edwardsville	Richmond, Kentucky
2:00 p.m. EDT	Nicole Collins 8'	Report	5' Peyton Roehnelt; 25' Caroline Hoefert	Stadium: EKU Soccer Field; Attendance: 175; Referee: Joshua Brooks; Assistant referees: Stan Sizemore; Jordan Barker; Fourth official: Reiss Baxter

October 27, 2017	#5 Southeast Missouri	2–1	#8 Austin Peay	Nashville, Tennessee
5:30 p.m. CDT	Maddi Karstens 30'; Esmie Gonzales 31'	Report	82' (pen.) McKenzie Dixon	Stadium: E. S. Rose Park; Attendance: 179; Referee: John Morris; Assistant referees: Timothy Stewart; Caleb Nobles; Fourth official: Jodi Hitchel

=== Quarterfinals ===
October 29, 2017	#3 Eastern Kentucky	2–1	#7 SIU Edwardsville	Richmond, Kentucky
1:00 p.m. EDT	Jordan Foster 6'; Katie Shaffer 44'	Report	35' (pen.) Becca Jostes	Stadium: EKU Soccer Field; Attendance: 230; Referee: Chad Collins; Assistant referees: Benjamin Hall-Volpenhein; Evan Sizemore; Fourth official: Reiss Baxter

October 29, 2017	#4 Belmont	0–0 (a.e.t.) (4–5 p)	#5 Southeast Missouri	Nashville, Tennessee
2:00 p.m. CDT		Report		Stadium: E. S. Rose Park; Attendance: 452; Referee: Don Eubank; Assistant referees: Skyye Medley; Matt Drew; Fourth official: Michael Sparta
	Penalties
	Sarah Bossung (penalty scored); Belicia Mendiola (penalty scored); Tara Austin (penalty scored); Sydney Cason (penalty scored); Julie Garst (penalty missed)		(penalty scored) Kindra Lierz; (penalty scored) Lexi Grote; (penalty scored) Esmie Gonzales; (penalty scored) Katie Lever; (penalty scored) Paige Blankenheim

=== Semifinals ===
November 3, 2017	#2 Tennessee Tech	0–1 (a.e.t.)	#3 Eastern Kentucky	Murray, Kentucky
11:00 a.m. CDT		Report	109' Haley Kemper	Stadium: Cutchin Field; Attendance: 117; Referee: Jose Ronda; Assistant referees: Lucy Bell; Robie Musoiu; Fourth official: Claude Airall

November 3, 2017	#1 Murray State	1–0	#5 Southeast Missouri	Murray, Kentucky
2:00 p.m. CDT	Miyah Watford 29'	Report		Stadium: Cutchin Field; Attendance: 379; Referee: Keith Green; Assistant referees: Carl Hagemann Jr; Don Eubank; Fourth official: Claude Airall

=== Final ===
November 5, 2017	#1 Murray State	1–0 (a.e.t.)	#3 Eastern Kentucky	Murray, Kentucky
1:00 p.m. CST	Miyah Watford 94'	Report		Stadium: Cutchin Field; Attendance: 576; Referee: Mathew Bell; Assistant referees: Claude Airall; Gustavo Turmero; Fourth official: Joshua Nobles

== Statistics ==
=== Goalscorers ===
2 Goals

- Miyah Watford – Murray State

1 Goal

- Nicole Collins – UT Martin
- McKenzie Dixon – Austin Peay
- Jordan Foster – Eastern Kentucky
- Esmie Gonzales – Southeast Missouri
- Caroline Hoefert – SIU Edwardsville
- Becca Jostes – SIU Edwardsville
- Maddi Karstens – Southeast Missouri
- Haley Kemper – Eastern Kentucky
- Peyton Roehnelt – SIU Edwardsville
- Katie Shaffer – Eastern Kentucky
