= Stephanie Malherbe =

American–South African soccer player

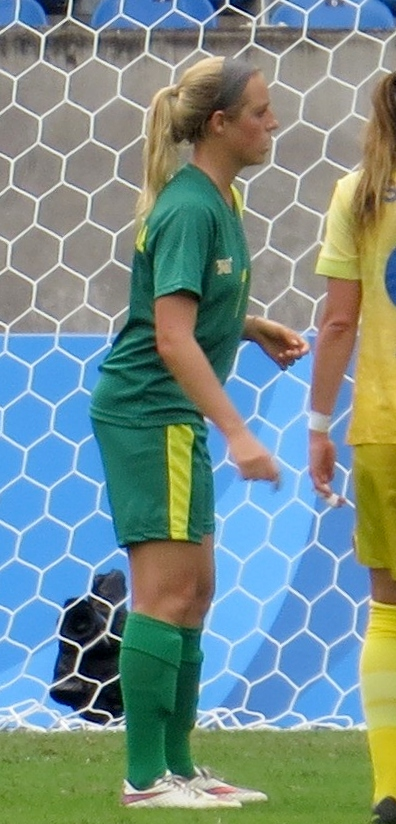
- Malherbe at the 2016 Olympics

Personal information
- Date of birth: 5 April 1996 (age 30)
- Place of birth: Temecula, California, U.S.
- Height: 1.62 m (5 ft 4 in)
- Position: Midfielder

College career
| Years | Team | Apps | (Gls) |
| 2014–2017 | Texas A&M Aggies | | |

Senior career*
| Years | Team | Apps | (Gls) |
| 2019 | Djurgårdens IF | 5 | (0) |

International career^{‡}
| 2016– | South Africa | 8 | (0) |
- * Club domestic league appearances and goals ‡ National team caps and goals as of 17 November 2016

Stephanie Hana Malherbe (born 5 April 1996) is an American-born South African soccer player who plays as a forward. She played for the South Africa women's national team at the 2016 Summer Olympics. She has also played for Swedish club Djurgårdens IF.

== Early life ==
She was born on 5 April 1996 in Temecula, California, and attended Great Oak High School there. Both her parents are South Africans who now reside in the United States. Malherbe played football while in high school, being named the South Eastern Conference High School Player of the Year. While attending Texas A&M University where she studies accounting, she began to play for the women's soccer team. She was named to the 2014 National Collegiate Athletic Association All Freshman Team.

== International career ==
Malherbe sought South African nationality prior to the qualifiers for the 2016 Summer Olympics in Rio de Janeiro, in order to allow her to play for the South Africa women's national football team in the football tournament. Although she was unable to do so because of holdups in her application, she trained with the women's U20 team. She said that "I was shy and didn’t know if I would be accepted. But the team was very welcoming and now I feel very comfortable among my teammates. I guess as a person you adapt quickly and that’s what I did".

Her South Africa documentation arrived prior to the Olympics itself, and so she was chosen for the squad which played there. She said "I never really thought some day I would be at the Olympics. But to be honest, this has been a big dream of mine since I was very young but I never thought I would be able to make it a reality, so it’s very exciting." She made her debut playing against Cameroon women's national football team in Doula, Cameroon, on 25 March 2016.
