= 2017 Patriot League women's soccer tournament =

- Classification: Division I
- Teams: 6
- Matches: 5
- Attendance: 3,858
- Site: Glenn Warner Soccer Facility; Annapolis, Maryland (Semifinals and Final)
- Champions: Bucknell (4th title)
- Winning coach: Kelly Cook (2nd title)

2017 Patriot League women's soccer standings
	Conf.						Overall
Team	W		L		T	PCT	W		L		T	PCT
Navy ‍†‍‍	8	–	0	–	1	.944	16	–	4	–	1	.786
Bucknell ‍‍‡‍^{y}	7	–	2	–	0	.778	12	–	9	–	0	.571
Boston University ‍‍‍	6	–	2	–	1	.722	10	–	8	–	3	.548
Colgate ‍‍‍	5	–	2	–	2	.667	10	–	7	–	2	.579
Lehigh ‍‍‍	5	–	2	–	2	.667	9	–	5	–	4	.611
Lafayette ‍‍‍	3	–	5	–	1	.389	5	–	9	–	2	.375
Holy Cross ‍‍‍	2	–	4	–	3	.389	4	–	9	–	4	.353
Army ‍‍‍	2	–	6	–	1	.278	4	–	11	–	2	.294
American ‍‍‍	1	–	8	–	0	.111	2	–	15	–	0	.118
Loyola (MD) ‍‍‍	0	–	8	–	1	.056	3	–	13	–	1	.206
† – Conference champion ‡ – 2017 Patriot League tournament champion y – Invited to the NCAA tournament As of November 11, 2017; Rankings from United Soccer Coaches Poll; Source:Patriot League

The 2017 Patriot League women's soccer tournament was the postseason women's soccer tournament for the Patriot League held from October 31 through November 5, 2017. The quarterfinals of the tournament were held at campus sites, while the semifinals and final took place at Glenn Warner Soccer Facility in Annapolis, Maryland. The six-team single-elimination tournament consisted of three rounds based on seeding from regular season conference play. The defending champions were the Bucknell Bison and they successfully defended their title, defeating the Navy Midshipmen in the conference final. The conference championship was the fourth for the Bucknell women's soccer program and the second for head coach Kelly Cook.

== Bracket ==
Quarterfinals; Tuesday, Oct. 31
4	Colgate	1^{OT}
5	Lehigh	0
3	Boston	1
6	Lafayette	0

Semifinals; Friday, Nov. 3
1	Navy	3
4	Colgate	0
2	Bucknell	1
3	Boston	0

Final; Sunday, Nov. 5
1	Navy	2
2	Bucknell	3

== Schedule ==
=== Quarterfinals ===
October 31, 2017	#3 Boston	1–0	#6 Lafayette	Boston, Massachusetts
7:05 p.m. EDT	Jacki Carty 75'	Report		Stadium: Nickerson Field; Attendance: 155; Referee: Patrick Violette; Assistant referees: Jess Remmes; Brian Graves; Fourth official: Max Perkins

October 31, 2017	#4 Colgate	1–0 (a.e.t.)	#5 Lehigh	Hamilton, New York
7:05 p.m. EDT	Emily Crichlow 99'	Report		Stadium: Beyer-Small Field; Attendance: 867; Referee: Lauren Dearman; Assistant referees: Alex Parent; Mindy Malia; Fourth official: Judson Ames

=== Semifinals ===
November 3, 2017	#1 Navy	3–0	#4 Colgate	Annapolis, Maryland
5:05 p.m. EDT	Ash Fairow 7', 25', 84'	Report		Stadium: Glenn Warner Soccer Facility; Referee: Mike DeFelice; Assistant referees: Will Aten; Tim Suess; Fourth official: Ben Pilgrim

November 3, 2017	#2 Bucknell	1–0	#3 Boston	Annapolis, Maryland
8:05 p.m. EDT	Alex Catanzarite 87'	Report		Stadium: Glenn Warner Soccer Facility; Attendance: 2418; Referee: Karl Kummer; Assistant referees: Daniel Schuh; Jonah Kind; Fourth official: Thomas Goubeaux

=== Final ===
November 5, 2017	#1 Navy	2–3	#2 Bucknell	Annapolis, Maryland
12:05 p.m. EST	Clare Macadam 28'; Ash Fairow 65'	Report	2', 12', 22' Kendall Ham	Stadium: Glenn Warner Soccer Facility; Attendance: 418; Referee: Andrew Dennis; Assistant referees: Ningwei Li; Jordan Gray; Fourth official: Will Aten

== Statistics ==
=== Goalscorers ===
4 Goals

- Ash Fairow - Navy

3 Goals

- Kendall Ham - Bucknell

1 Goal

- Jacki Carty - Boston
- Alex Catanzarite - Bucknell
- Emily Crichlow - Colgate
- Clare Macadam - Navy

== See also ==
- 2017 Patriot League Men's Soccer Tournament
