= 2017 WAC women's soccer tournament =

- Classification: Division I
- Teams: 6
- Matches: 5
- Attendance: 2,155
- Site: GCU Stadium; Phoenix, Arizona
- Champions: Utah Valley (2nd title)
- Winning coach: Chris Lemay (1st title)
- Broadcast: WAC Digital Network

2017 WAC women's soccer standings
	Conf.						Overall
Team	W		L		T	PCT	W		L		T	PCT
UMKC ‍†‍‍	7	–	0	–	0	1.000	12	–	7	–	1	.625
Utah Valley ‍‍‡‍^{y}	5	–	2	–	0	.714	10	–	12	–	1	.457
UTRGV ‍‍‍	4	–	2	–	1	.643	9	–	8	–	3	.525
Seattle ‍‍‍	3	–	2	–	2	.571	10	–	8	–	4	.545
New Mexico State ‍‍‍	3	–	3	–	1	.500	9	–	10	–	2	.476
Grand Canyon ‍‍‍	2	–	4	–	1	.357	6	–	13	–	2	.333
Cal State Bakersfield ‍‍‍	1	–	5	–	1	.214	6	–	12	–	1	.342
Chicago State ‍‍‍	0	–	7	–	0	.000	1	–	19	–	0	.050
† – Conference champion ‡ – 2017 WAC Tournament champion y – Invited to the NCAA tournament As of November 11, 2017; Rankings from United Soccer Coaches Poll; Source:WAC

The 2017 Western Athletic Conference women's soccer tournament was the postseason women's soccer tournament for the Western Athletic Conference held from November 1–5, 2017. The five match tournament took place at GCU Stadium in Phoenix on the campus of Grand Canyon University. The six-team single-elimination tournament consisted of three rounds based on seeding from regular season conference play. The defending champions were the Seattle Redhawks, but they failed to defend their title after losing the penalty shoot-out tiebreaking procedure following a tie with the Utah Valley Wolverines in the final. This was the second WAC women's soccer tournament championship for the Utah Valley women's soccer program and the first for first-year head coach Chris Lemay.

== Seeds ==
The top six teams qualify for the tournament. Teams receive three points for each win and one point for each tie within their seven-game conference schedule. Teams will be seeded by total points earned, with a tiebreaker system to seed teams with identical conference records. The top two seeds will receive byes to the semifinals.

Seed	School	Conf. Record	Points
1	UMKC	7–0–0	21
2	Utah Valley	5–2–0	15
3	UTRGV	4–2–1	13
4	Seattle U	3–2–2	11
5	New Mexico State	3–3–1	10
6	Grand Canyon	2–4–1	7

== Bracket ==
First round Wednesday, Nov. 1
4	Seattle	3
5	New Mexico State	0
3	UTRGV	1
6	Grand Canyon	2^{OT}

Semifinals; Friday, Nov. 3
1	UMKC	0
4	Seattle	1
2	Utah Valley	1
6	Grand Canyon	0

Final; Sunday, Nov. 5
4	Seattle	1 (1)
2	Utah Valley	1 (3)

== Schedule ==
=== First round ===
November 1, 2017	#4 Seattle	3–0	#5 New Mexico State	Phoenix, Arizona
4:00 p.m. MST	Laura Hooper 43'; Holly Rothering 48'; Natasha Howe 57'	Report		Stadium: GCU Stadium; Referee: Will Niccolls; Assistant referees: Mario Coss; Noah Kenyawani; Fourth official: Charles Farr

November 1, 2017	#3 UTRGV	1–2 (a.e.t.)	#6 Grand Canyon	Phoenix, Arizona
7:00 p.m. MST	Sarah Bonney 90' (pen.)	Report	5', 95' McKenzie Cook; (red card) 90' Grand Canyon staff	Stadium: GCU Stadium; Attendance: 1033; Referee: Masoud Rasti; Assistant referees: Robi Hullner; Cuong Dinh; Fourth official: Robert Thomas

=== Semifinals ===
November 3, 2017	#1 UMKC	0–1	#4 Seattle	Phoenix, Arizona
4:00 p.m. MST		Report	17' Jessie Ray	Stadium: GCU Stadium; Attendance: 136; Referee: Masoud Rasti; Assistant referees: Anthony Bersano; Cuong Dinh; Fourth official: Robert Defibaugh

November 3, 2017	#2 Utah Valley	1–0	#6 Grand Canyon	Phoenix, Arizona
7:00 p.m. MST	Breanna McCarter 74'	Report		Stadium: GCU Stadium; Attendance: 881; Referee: Will Niccolls; Assistant referees: Mike Ambrose; Nicholas Gastelum; Fourth official: Noah Kenyawani

=== Final ===
November 5, 2017	#4 Seattle	1–1 (a.e.t.) (1–3 p)	#2 Utah Valley	Phoenix, Arizona
1:00 p.m. MST	Natasha Howe 30'	Report	90' Siri Dahl	Stadium: GCU Stadium; Attendance: 241; Referee: Daniel Vehabovic; Assistant referees: Nicholas Gastelum; Mario Coss; Fourth official: Benjamin Scott
	Penalties
	Laura Hooper (penalty scored); Natasha Howe (penalty missed); Olivia Ovenell (penalty missed); Holly Rothering (penalty missed)		(penalty scored) Breanna DeWaal; (penalty scored) Libby Weber; (penalty scored) Tori Smith

== Statistics ==
=== Goalscorers ===
2 Goals

- McKenzie Cook - Grand Canyon
- Natasha Howe - Seattle

1 Goal

- Sarah Bonney - UTRGV
- Siri Dahl - Utah Valley
- Laura Hooper - Seattle
- Breanna McCarter - Utah Valley
- Jessie Ray - Seattle
- Holly Rothering - Seattle
