= 2017 SWAC women's soccer tournament =

- Classification: Division I
- Teams: 8
- Matches: 7
- Attendance: 911
- Site: PVA&M Soccer Stadium; Prairie View, Texas
- Champions: Alabama State (2nd title)
- Winning coach: Jodie Smith (2nd title)

2017 SWAC women's soccer standings
	Conf.						Overall
Team	W		L		T	PCT	W		L		T	PCT
Alabama State ‍†‍‡‍^{y}	8	–	2	–	0	.800	11	–	8	–	2	.571
Grambling State ‍‍‍	7	–	2	–	1	.750	11	–	7	–	2	.600
Howard ‍‍‍	7	–	2	–	1	.750	9	–	10	–	1	.475
Prairie View A&M ‍‍‍	6	–	2	–	2	.700	6	–	9	–	2	.412
Texas Southern ‍‍‍	6	–	3	–	1	.650	8	–	7	–	3	.528
Mississippi Valley State ‍‍‍	5	–	4	–	1	.550	7	–	11	–	1	.395
Jackson State ‍‍‍	2	–	5	–	3	.350	2	–	14	–	3	.184
Alcorn State ‍‍‍	3	–	7	–	0	.300	4	–	10	–	0	.286
Alabama A&M ‍‍‍	3	–	7	–	0	.300	4	–	14	–	0	.222
Arkansas–Pine Bluff ‍‍‍	2	–	7	–	1	.250	2	–	13	–	1	.156
Southern ‍‍‍	0	–	8	–	2	.100	0	–	13	–	2	.067
† – Conference champion ‡ – 2017 SWAC Tournament champion y – Invited to the NCAA tournament As of November 10, 2017; Rankings from United Soccer Coaches Poll; Source:SWAC

The 2017 SWAC women's soccer tournament was the postseason women's soccer tournament for the Southwestern Athletic Conference held November 2–5, 2017. The seven-match tournament took place at the Prairie View A&M Soccer Stadium in Prairie View, Texas. The eight-team single-elimination tournament consisted of three rounds based on seeding from regular season conference play. The defending champions were the Alabama State Hornets and they successfully defended their title by virtue of winning the penalty shoot-out tiebreaking procedure following a tie with the Grambling State Tigers in the tournament final. The conference tournament title was the second in the history of the Alabama State women's soccer program, both of which have come under the direction of head coach Jodie Smith.

== Bracket ==
Quarterfinals; Thursday, Nov. 2
1	Alabama State	2
8	Alcorn State	1
4	Prairie View A&M	0
5	Texas Southern	1
2	Grambling State	1
7	Jackson State	0
3	Howard	4
6	Mississippi Valley	1

Semifinals; Friday, Nov. 3
1	Alabama State	1 (6)
5	Texas Southern	1 (5)
2	Grambling State	3
3	Howard	1

Final; Sunday, Nov. 5
1	Alabama State	0 (4)
2	Grambling State	0 (2)

== Schedule ==
=== Quarterfinals ===
November 2, 2017	#1 Alabama State	2–1	#8 Alcorn State	Prairie View, Texas
10:00 a.m. CDT	Shyann Cordova 42' (pen.); Inma Martinez 48'	Report	21' Yaira Guardado	Stadium: PVA&M Soccer Stadium; Attendance: 81

November 2, 2017	#4 Prairie View A&M	0–1	#5 Texas Southern	Prairie View, Texas
12:30 p.m. CDT		Report	49' Paige Hayward	Stadium: PVA&M Soccer Stadium; Attendance: 224; Referee: Lauren Reed; Assistant referees: Matt Thompson; Deshun Beard; Fourth official: Estafania Estrada

November 2, 2017	#3 Howard	4–1	#6 Mississippi Valley	Prairie View, Texas
3:00 p.m. CDT	Kela Gray 18', 22', 81'; Aleeya Sawyer 80'	Report	(red card) 70' Katelyn Denton; 72' Sheyenne Bonnick	Stadium: PVA&M Soccer Stadium; Attendance: 123; Referee: James Spencer; Assistant referees: Matt Thompson; Alyssa Pennington; Fourth official: Deepak Lumba

November 2, 2017	#2 Grambling State	1–0	#7 Jackson State	Prairie View, Texas
5:30 p.m. CDT	Kaylee Holt 71'	Report		Stadium: PVA&M Soccer Stadium; Attendance: 89; Referee: Estafania Estrada; Assistant referees: DeShun Beard; Matt Thompson; Fourth official: Lauren Reed

=== Semifinals ===
November 3, 2017	#1 Alabama State	1–1 (a.e.t.) (6–5 p)	#5 Texas Southern	Prairie View, Texas
3:00 p.m. CDT	Teaggan Ilela 2'	Report	52' Kelly Sanders	Stadium: PVA&M Soccer Stadium; Attendance: 126; Referee: Matt Thompson; Assistant referees: George Kubove; Lauren Reed; Fourth official: Deepak Lumba
	Penalties
	Inma Martinez (penalty scored); Teaggan Ilela (penalty missed); Lexi Krieger (penalty scored); Shelby Unruh (penalty scored); Shyann Cordova (penalty scored); Emily LaRue (penalty scored); Mercedes Padilla (penalty scored)		(penalty scored) Briana Norwood; (penalty missed) Alisa Holloway; (penalty scored) Brooke Ianiero; (penalty scored) Kayla Smith; (penalty scored) Madison Phillips; (penalty scored) Kelly Sanders; (penalty missed) Paige Hayward

November 3, 2017	#2 Grambling State	3–1	#3 Howard	Prairie View, Texas
5:30 p.m. CDT	Florence David 22'; Brittany Terry 45' (pen.); Jasmine Smith 54'	Report	82' Hollie Cartwright	Stadium: PVA&M Soccer Stadium; Attendance: 125; Referee: Deshun Beard; Assistant referees: Estefania Estrada; Bryan Estrada; Fourth official: Alyssa Pennington

=== Final ===
November 5, 2017	#1 Alabama State	0–0 (a.e.t.) (4–2 p)	#2 Grambling State	Prairie View, Texas
11:00 a.m. CST		Report		Stadium: PVA&M Soccer Stadium; Attendance: 143; Referee: Alyssa Pennington; Assistant referees: Matt Thompson; DeShun Beard; Fourth official: Lauren Reed
	Penalties
	Inma Martinez (penalty scored); Teaggan Ilela (penalty scored); Lexi Krieger (penalty scored); Shelby Unruh (penalty scored)		(penalty scored) Kaylee Holt; (penalty scored) Jasmine Smith; (penalty missed) Brittany Terry; (penalty missed) Sage Nelson

== Statistics ==
=== Goalscorers ===
3 Goals

- Kela Gray - Howard

1 Goal

- Sheyenne Bonnick - Mississippi Valley
- Hollie Cartwright - Howard
- Shyann Cordova - Alabama State
- Florence David - Grambling State
- Yaira Guardado - Alcorn State
- Paige Hayward - Texas Southern
- Kaylee Holt - Grambling State
- Teaggan Ilela - Alabama State
- Inma Martinez - Alabama State
- Kelly Sanders - Texas Southern
- Aleeya Sawyer - Howard
- Jasmine Smith - Grambling State
- Brittany Terry - Grambling State
