= 2017 American Athletic Conference women's soccer tournament =

Association football tournament

- Classification: Division I
- Teams: 6
- Matches: 5
- Site: UCF Soccer and Track Stadium; Orlando, Florida
- Champions: South Florida (1st title)
- Winning coach: Denise Schilte-Brown (1st title)
- Broadcast: American Digital Network (first round and semifinals); ESPNews (Final)

2017 American Athletic Conference women's soccer standings
	Conf.						Overall
Team	W		L		T	PCT	W		L		T	PCT
No. 17 UCF ‍†‍‍^{y}	7	–	0	–	2	.889	13	–	2	–	3	.806
South Florida ‡^{y} ‍‍‍	7	–	1	–	1	.833	13	–	4	–	2	.737
Cincinnati ‍‍‍	5	–	2	–	2	.667	12	–	4	–	3	.711
Memphis ‍‍‍	4	–	2	–	3	.611	11	–	6	–	3	.625
Connecticut ‍‍‍	5	–	4	–	0	.556	7	–	9	–	3	.447
SMU ‍‍‍	4	–	4	–	1	.500	10	–	7	–	3	.575
Houston ‍‍‍	3	–	6	–	0	.333	7	–	9	–	1	.441
Temple ‍‍‍	2	–	6	–	1	.278	6	–	10	–	2	.389
Tulsa ‍‍‍	1	–	6	–	2	.222	3	–	12	–	4	.263
East Carolina ‍‍‍	1	–	8	–	0	.111	6	–	10	–	2	.389
† – Conference champion ‡ – 2017 AAC Tournament champion y – Invited to the NCAA Tournament; As of November 17, 2017; Rankings from United Soccer Coaches Poll; Source:American Athletic Conference

The 2017 American Athletic Conference women's soccer tournament was the postseason women's soccer tournament for the American Athletic Conference held from November 1 to 5, 2017. The five-match tournament took place at UCF Soccer and Track Stadium, home field of the regular season champion UCF Knights in Orlando, Florida. The six-team single-elimination tournament consisted of three rounds based on seeding from regular season conference play. The Connecticut Huskies were the defending tournament champions, but they were eliminated from the 2017 tournament with a 3–1 first round loss to the Memphis Tigers. South Florida won the tournament by virtue of winning the penalty shoot-out tiebreaking procedure following a tie with UCF in the final. The conference tournament title was the first for the South Florida women's soccer program and for their head coach, Denise Schilte-Brown.

== Bracket ==
First round Wednesday, Nov. 1
4	Memphis	3
5	Connecticut	1
3	Cincinnati	0
6	SMU	1

Semifinals; Friday, Nov. 3
1	UCF	3
4	Memphis	0
2	South Florida	1
6	SMU	0

Final; Sunday, Nov. 5
1	UCF	0 (3)
2	South Florida	0 (5)

== Schedule ==
=== First round ===
November 1, 2017	#3 Cincinnati	0–1	#6 SMU	Orlando, Florida
4:30 p.m. EDT		Report	36' Allie Thornton	Stadium: UCF Soccer and Track Stadium; Referee: Joe Rio; Assistant referees: Tom Felice; Mark Allatin; Fourth official: Cassio Ribeiro

November 1, 2017	#4 Memphis	3–1	#5 Connecticut	Orlando, Florida
7:00 p.m. EDT	Mikayla Morton 10', 55' (pen.); Elizabeth Woerner 54'	Report	77' Vivien Beil	Stadium: UCF Soccer and Track Stadium; Referee: Michael Wallace; Assistant referees: Cassio Ribeiro; Alex Casella; Fourth official: Tom Felice

=== Semifinals ===
November 3, 2017	#2 South Florida	1–0	#6 SMU	Orlando, Florida
4:30 p.m. EDT	Evelyne Viens 34'	Report		Stadium: UCF Soccer and Track Stadium; Referee: Cassio Ribeiro; Assistant referees: Joe Poremba; Mike Wallace; Fourth official: Jan Halaska

November 3, 2017	#1 UCF	3–0	#4 Memphis	Orlando, Florida
7:00 p.m. EDT	Stasia Mallin 4' (o.g.); Morgan Ferrara 8' (pen.); Stefanie Sanders 34'	Report		Stadium: UCF Soccer and Track Stadium; Attendance: 535; Referee: Bruno Mozzo; Assistant referees: Tom Felice; Alex Casella; Fourth official: Joe Rio

=== Final ===
November 5, 2017	#1 UCF	0–0 (a.e.t.) (3–5 p)	#2 South Florida	Orlando, Florida
2:00 p.m. EST		Report		Stadium: UCF Soccer and Track Stadium; Attendance: 952; Referee: Mark Allatin; Assistant referees: Jan Halaska; Bruno Mozzo; Fourth official: Joe Poremba
	Penalties
	Kathellen Sousa (penalty scored); Stefanie Sanders (penalty scored); Christine Creighton (penalty scored); Morgan Ferrara (penalty missed)		(penalty scored) Andrea Hauksdottir; (penalty scored) Evelyne Viens; (penalty scored) Sabrina Wagner; (penalty scored) Leah Ferlin; (penalty scored) Kelli Burney

== Statistics ==
=== Goalscorers ===
1 Goal

- Vivien Beil – Connecticut
- Morgan Ferrara – UCF
- Stasia Mallin – UCF
- Mikayla Morton – Memphis
- Stefanie Sanders – UCF
- Allie Thornton – SMU
- Evelyne Viens – South Florida
- Elizabeth Woerner – Memphis

== See also ==
- 2017 American Athletic Conference Men's Soccer Tournament
