= 2017 Mid-American Conference women's soccer tournament =

- Classification: Division I
- Teams: 8
- Matches: 7
- Attendance: 2,815
- Site: Dix Stadium; Kent, Ohio
- Champions: Toledo (5th title)
- Winning coach: TJ Buchholz (1st title)

2017 Mid-American Conference women's soccer standings
	Conf.						Overall
Team	W		L		T	PCT	W		L		T	PCT
East Division
Kent State ‍†‍‍	9	–	2	–	0	.818	13	–	6	–	2	.667
Bowling Green ‍‍‍	6	–	4	–	1	.591	13	–	7	–	1	.643
Buffalo ‍‍‍	5	–	4	–	2	.545	7	–	9	–	3	.447
Ohio ‍‍‍	4	–	5	–	2	.455	7	–	10	–	3	.425
Miami (OH) ‍‍‍	2	–	8	–	1	.227	2	–	15	–	1	.139
Akron ‍‍‍	1	–	7	–	3	.227	2	–	13	–	4	.211
West Division
Ball State ‍‍‍	8	–	1	–	2	.818	11	–	7	–	3	.595
Toledo ‍‍‡‍^{y}	6	–	3	–	2	.636	12	–	8	–	3	.587
Western Michigan ‍‍‍	5	–	5	–	1	.500	10	–	8	–	1	.553
Northern Illinois ‍‍‍	5	–	6	–	0	.455	8	–	10	–	1	.447
Eastern Michigan ‍‍‍	4	–	7	–	0	.364	7	–	12	–	1	.375
Central Michigan ‍‍‍	3	–	6	–	2	.364	8	–	8	–	3	.500
† – Conference champion ‡ – 2017 MAC Tournament champion y – Invited to the NCAA tournament As of November 10, 2017; Rankings from United Soccer Coaches Poll; Source:Mid-American Conference

The 2017 Mid-American Conference women's soccer tournament was the postseason women's soccer tournament for the Mid-American Conference held from October 29 through November 5, 2017. The quarterfinals were held at campus sites. The semifinals and finals took place at Dix Stadium in Kent, Ohio, home of the Kent State Golden Flashes, the highest remaining seed in the tournament following the quarterfinal matches. The eight-team single-elimination tournament will consist of three rounds based on seeding from regular season conference play. The Kent State Golden Flashes were the defending champions, but they were eliminated from the 2017 tournament with a 2–1 semifinal loss to the Bowling Green Falcons. The Toledo Rockets won the tournament with a 2–1 win in overtime over Bowling Green in the final. The title was the fifth for the Toledo women's soccer program and the first for head coach TJ Buchholz.

== Bracket ==
Quarterfinals; Sunday, Oct. 29
1	Kent State	1 (4)
8	Ohio	1 (2)
4	Bowling Green	3
5	Buffalo	1
2	Ball State	2
7	Northern Illinois	1
3	Toledo	2
6	Western Michigan	1

Semifinals; Friday, Nov. 3
1	Kent State	1
4	Bowling Green	2
2	Ball State	1
3	Toledo	2^{2OT}

Final; Sunday, Nov. 5
4	Bowling Green	1
3	Toledo	2^{OT}

== Schedule ==
=== Quarterfinals ===
October 29, 2017	#1 Kent State	1–1 (a.e.t.) (4–2 p)	#8 Ohio	Kent, Ohio
1:00 p.m. EDT	Vital Kats 65'	Report	70' Mandy Arnzen	Stadium: Dix Stadium; Attendance: 275; Referee: Nicole Green; Assistant referees: Justin Tatsak; Steve Besk; Fourth official: Alexander Dresdow
	Penalties
	Donavan Capehart (penalty scored); Kristen Brots (penalty scored); Hayden Pascoe (penalty scored); Maddie Holmes (penalty scored)		Allie Curry (penalty scored); Remi Eades (penalty missed); Sydney Leckie (penalty scored); Alivia Milesky (penalty missed)

October 29, 2017	#4 Bowling Green	3–1	#5 Buffalo	Bowling Green, Ohio
1:00 p.m. EDT	Erica Hubert 56', 80'; Rachel Winters 61'	Report	37' Carissima Cutrona	Stadium: Cochrane Stadium; Attendance: 1,000; Referee: Brian Miller; Assistant referees: Jeffrey Mellen; Ryan Slack; Fourth official: Bradley Barlog

October 29, 2017	#2 Ball State	2–1	#7 Eastern Michigan	Muncie, Indiana
1:00 p.m. EDT	Lauren Roll 28'; Julia Elvbo 35'	Report	73' Allie Ingham	Stadium: Briner Sports Complex; Attendance: 372; Referee: Calin Radosav; Assistant referees: Michael Wojtan; James Wozny; Fourth official: Sean West

October 29, 2017	#3 Toledo	2–1	#6 Western Michigan	Toledo, Ohio
1:00 p.m. EDT	Sophie Pohl 16'; Isa Echeverri 54' (pen.)	Report	89' Alex Ruffer	Stadium: Scott Park; Attendance: 375; Referee: Cesar Ibarra; Assistant referees: Fernando Ibarra; Mike Valsamis; Fourth official: John Spisak

=== Semifinals ===
November 3, 2017	#2 Ball State	1–2 (a.e.t.)	#3 Toledo	Kent, Ohio
4:00 p.m. EDT	Allison Abbe 9'	Report	56' Alena Sidwell; 107' Regan Price	Stadium: Dix Stadium; Attendance: 214; Referee: Donovan Noocha; Assistant referees: Jacob Little; Marc Lawrence; Fourth official: Ted Grigoriou

November 3, 2017	#1 Kent State	1–2	#4 Bowling Green	Kent, Ohio
7:00 p.m. EDT	Hayden Pascoe 80'	Report	22' Erica Hubert; 71' Rachel Winters	Stadium: Dix Stadium; Attendance: 310; Referee: Christopher Koloffon; Assistant referees: Jose Ortiz; Maggie Short; Fourth official: Ted Grigoriou

=== Final ===
November 5, 2017	#4 Bowling Green	1–2 (a.e.t.)	#3 Toledo	Kent, Ohio
1:00 p.m. EST	Erica Hubert 79'	Report	59', 100' Sophie Pohl	Stadium: Dix Stadium; Attendance: 269; Referee: Nick Balcer; Assistant referees: Alexander Plum; Sorin Stoica; Fourth official: Ted Grigoriou

== Statistics ==
=== Goalscorers ===
4 Goals

- Erica Hubert - Bowling Green

3 Goals

- Sophie Pohl - Toledo

2 Goals

- Rachel Winters - Bowling Green

1 Goal

- Allison Abbe - Ball State
- Mandy Arnzen - Ohio
- Carissima Cutrona - Buffalo
- Isa Echeverri - Toledo
- Julia Elvbo - Ball State
- Allie Ingham - Eastern Michigan
- Vital Kats - Kent State
- Hayden Pascoe - Kent State
- Regan Price - Toledo
- Lauren Roll - Ball State
- Alex Ruffer - Western Michigan
- Alena Sidwell - Toledo

== See also ==
- 2017 MAC Men's Soccer Tournament
