= 2017 Mountain West Conference women's soccer tournament =

- Classification: Division I
- Teams: 6
- Matches: 5
- Attendance: 728
- Site: Peter Johann Memorial Soccer Field; Las Vegas, Nevada
- Champions: San Diego State (5th title)
- Winning coach: Mike Friesen (5th title)
- Broadcast: Mountain West Network/Stadium

2017 Mountain West Conference women's soccer standings
	Conf.						Overall
Team	W		L		T	PCT	W		L		T	PCT
San Jose State ‍†‍‍	9	–	1	–	1	.864	12	–	6	–	2	.650
San Diego State ‡^{y} ‍‍‍	7	–	2	–	2	.727	12	–	8	–	2	.591
Boise State ‍‍‍	7	–	2	–	2	.727	13	–	6	–	3	.659
New Mexico ‍‍‍	7	–	4	–	0	.636	12	–	8	–	2	.591
Fresno State ‍‍‍	5	–	4	–	2	.545	10	–	6	–	4	.600
Air Force ‍‍‍	4	–	4	–	3	.500	7	–	9	–	3	.447
UNLV ‍‍‍	5	–	6	–	0	.455	13	–	7	–	0	.650
Utah State ‍‍‍	4	–	5	–	2	.455	9	–	7	–	3	.553
Wyoming ‍‍‍	4	–	6	–	1	.409	8	–	9	–	2	.474
Colorado College ‍‍‍	3	–	6	–	2	.364	6	–	9	–	4	.421
Colorado State ‍‍‍	2	–	6	–	3	.318	4	–	10	–	5	.342
Nevada ‍‍‍	0	–	11	–	0	.000	1	–	18	–	0	.053
† – Conference champion ‡ – 2017 MW Tournament champion y – Invited to the NCAA tournament As of November 10, 2017; Rankings from United Soccer Coaches Poll; Source:Mountain West Conference

The 2017 Mountain West Conference women's soccer tournament was the postseason women's soccer tournament for the Mountain West Conference held from October 31 through November 4, 2017. The five-match tournament took place at Peter Johann Memorial Soccer Field in Las Vegas, Nevada. The six-team single-elimination tournament consisted of three rounds based on seeding from regular season conference play. The UNLV Rebels were the defending champions, but will not defend their title after having failed to qualify for the 2017 tournament. The San Diego State Aztecs won the tournament with a 3–0 win over the New Mexico Lobos in the final.

== Bracket ==
Quarterfinals; Tuesday, Oct. 31
4	New Mexico	2 (5)
5	Fresno State	2 (4)
3	Boise State	2
6	Air Force	0

Semifinals; Thursday, Nov. 2
1	San Jose State	2 (3)
4	New Mexico	2 (5)
2	San Diego State	1
3	Boise State	0

Final; Saturday, Nov. 4
4	New Mexico	0
2	San Diego State	3

== Schedule ==
=== Quarterfinals ===
October 31, 2017	#3 Boise State	2–0	#6 Air Force	Las Vegas, Nevada
4:00 p.m. PDT	Raimee Sherle 52', 69'	Report		Stadium: Peter Johann Memorial Soccer Field; Referee: Alejandro Llamas; Assistant referees: Joe Pickens; Miguel Palacios; Fourth official: Jason Wolf

October 31, 2017	#4 New Mexico	2–2 (a.e.t.) (5–4 p)	#5 Fresno State	Las Vegas, Nevada
7:00 p.m. PDT	Eileen Zendejas 16'; Claire Lynch (red card) 74'; Jessie Hix 87'	Report	34' Julia Glaser; 39' Myra Delgadillo	Stadium: Peter Johann Memorial Soccer Field; Attendance: 185; Referee: Ryan Cuddy; Assistant referees: Uriel Aguilera; Benjamin Limon; Fourth official: Joe Pickens
	Penalties
	Jessie Hix (penalty scored); Jennifer Munoz (penalty scored); Isabella Jimenez (penalty missed); Jill Olguin (penalty scored); Amelia Bierle (penalty scored); Jessica Nelson (penalty scored)		(penalty scored) Myra Delgadillo; (penalty scored) Marina Kerrache; (penalty scored) Kasidee Wiley; (penalty scored) Julia Glaser; (penalty missed) Angie Weiner; (penalty missed) Anna Crawford

=== Semifinals ===
November 2, 2017	#2 San Diego State	1–0	#3 Boise State	Las Vegas, Nevada
4:00 p.m. PDT	Aliyah Utush 48'	Report		Stadium: Peter Johann Memorial Soccer Field; Attendance: 150; Referee: Robert Sarfaraz; Assistant referees: Jason Wolf; William Delgado; Fourth official: Randy Hoffman

November 2, 2017	#1 San Jose State	2–2 (a.e.t.) (3–5 p)	#4 New Mexico	Las Vegas, Nevada
7:00 p.m. PDT	Yaritza Arista 17'; Sabrina Miller 46'	Report	5' Jessie Hix; 33' Casey Murphy	Stadium: Peter Johann Memorial Soccer Field; Attendance: 199; Referee: Randy Hoffman; Assistant referees: Scott Conner; Ryan Cuddy; Fourth official: Robert Sarfaraz
	Penalties
	Gabriella Herrera (penalty scored); Dörthe Hoppius (penalty scored); Gabriella Hurtado (penalty scored); Jamilecxth Becerra (penalty missed)		(penalty scored) Jessie Hix; (penalty scored) Jennifer Munoz; (penalty scored) Jill Olguin; (penalty scored) Isabella Jimenez; (penalty scored) Amelia Bierle

=== Final ===
November 4, 2017	#4 New Mexico	0–3	#2 San Diego State	Las Vegas, Nevada
7:00 p.m. PDT		Report	58', 76', 81' Aliyah Utush	Stadium: Peter Johann Memorial Soccer Field; Attendance: 194; Referee: Nathan Max; Assistant referees: Joe Pickens; Juan Colazo; Fourth official: Ryan Cuddy

== Statistics ==
=== Goalscorers ===
4 Goals

- Aliyah Utush – San Diego State

2 Goals

- Jessie Hix – New Mexico
- Raimee Sherle – Boise State

1 Goal

- Yaritza Arista – San Jose State
- Myra Delgadillo – Fresno State
- Julia Glaser – Fresno State
- Sabrina Miller – San Jose State
- Casey Murphy – New Mexico
- Eileen Zendejas – New Mexico
