= 2017 Arkansas Razorbacks women's soccer team =

American college soccer season

2017 Arkansas Razorbacks women's soccer

SEC Tournament Final, L 1–2 vs. Texas A&M NCAA Tournament First Round
- Conference: Southeastern Conference
- Record: 11–11–2 (6–6–2 SEC)
- Head coach: Colby Hale (6th season)
- Assistant coaches: Kristi Kiely (3rd season); David Gough (1st season)
- Home stadium: Razorback Field (Capacity: 1,500)

2017 SEC women's soccer standings
	Conf.						Overall
Team	W		L		T	PCT	W		L		T	PCT
#4 South Carolina †^{y} ‍‍‍	9	–	0	–	1	.950	19	–	3	–	1	.848
No. 12 Texas A&M ‍‍‡‍^{y}	9	–	1	–	0	.900	18	–	2	–	2	.864
No. 6 Florida ‍‍‍^{y}	7	–	3	–	0	.700	17	–	7	–	0	.708
Vanderbilt ‍‍‍^{y}	6	–	3	–	1	.650	13	–	7	–	2	.636
No. 25 Tennessee ‍‍‍^{y}	6	–	3	–	1	.650	15	–	4	–	2	.762
Auburn ‍‍‍^{y}	4	–	2	–	4	.600	8	–	7	–	5	.525
Arkansas ‍‍‍^{y}	4	–	5	–	1	.450	11	–	11	–	2	.500
Alabama ‍‍‍^{y}	4	–	5	–	1	.450	12	–	8	–	1	.595
Ole Miss ‍‍‍^{y}	3	–	5	–	2	.400	10	–	7	–	3	.575
Missouri ‍‍‍	3	–	7	–	0	.300	8	–	12	–	1	.405
Kentucky ‍‍‍	3	–	7	–	0	.300	8	–	12	–	0	.400
Mississippi State ‍‍‍	2	–	5	–	3	.350	8	–	5	–	4	.588
LSU ‍‍‍	1	–	6	–	3	.250	8	–	7	–	3	.528
Georgia ‍‍‍	0	–	9	–	1	.050	4	–	12	–	2	.278
† – Conference champion ‡ – 2017 SEC Tournament champion y – Invited to the NCAA tournament As of December 1, 2017; Rankings from United Soccer Coaches Poll; Source:SEC

The 2017 Arkansas Razorbacks women's soccer team represented the University of Arkansas during the 2017 NCAA Division I women's soccer season. It was the 32nd season of the university fielding a program. The Razorbacks played their home games at Razorback Field in Fayetteville.

== Personnel ==
=== Roster ===
2017 Arkansas Razorbacks women's soccer
Goalkeepers: 00 Alexis Bach – Freshman (5'11); 0 Jordan Harris – (redshirt) Junior (5'10); 1 Rachel Harris – Freshman (5'9); 33 Taylor Beitz – (redshirt) Freshman (5'9); Defenders: 2 Elizabeth Poblete – (redshirt) Sophomore (6'0); 6 Carly Hoke – Junior (5'6); 9 Carsen Parker – Freshman (5'8); 15 Jessi Hartzler – Senior (5'8); 19 Haley Vanfossen – Freshman (5'10); 21 Ellie Breden – Junior (5'9); 29 Hannah Neece – Senior (5'7); 32 Qyara Winston – (redshirt) Junior (5'8)	Midfielders: 4 Taylor Malham – Freshman (5'10); 7 Katie Kienstra – Senior (5'7); 10 Alli Gardner – Freshman (5'11); 11 Brooke Pirkle – Freshman (5'11); 12 Kayla McKeon – Sophomore (5'10); 13 Ansley Bunger – Freshman (5'10); 14 Reid Sibley – (redshirt) Junior (5'6); 17 Stefani Doyle – Sophomore (5'6); 18 Reece Christopherson – Junior (5'3); 23 Nayeli Perez – Freshman (5'6); 24 Abbi Neece – Freshman (5'7); Forwards: 3 Tori Cannata – Sophomore (5'9); 8 Caroline Campbell – Freshman (5'3); 16 Allie Dunn – Freshman (5'6); 22 Parker Goins – Freshman (5'10); 28 MaKayle Traxson – Freshman (5'6)

=== Coaching staff ===
Coach	Position	Year in Position	Alma Mater
Colby Hale	Head coach	6th	Oral Roberts University (1997)
Kristi Kiely	Assistant coach	3rd	Westmont College (2003)
David Gough	Assistant coach	1st	Cardiff Metropolitan University (2005)
Eric Bracy	Volunteer Assistant Coach	1st	Hendrix College (2015)

== Schedule ==
Date Time, TV	Rank^{#}	Opponent^{#}	Result	Record	Site (Attendance) City, State
Exhibition
August 10*; 7:00 pm		Omaha	W 3–0		Razorback Field; Fayetteville, AR
Regular season
August 18*; 7:00 pm, COX	No. 17	at SMU	L 0–1 ^{AET}	0–1	Westcott Field (1,322); Dallas, TX
August 20*; 1:00 pm, CUSATV	No. 17	at North Texas	W 2–0	1–1	MG Soccer Complex (623); Denton, TX
August 25*; 6:30 pm, SECN+	No. 23	No. 1 Penn State	L 2–4	1–2	Razorback Field (3,401); Fayetteville, AR
August 27*; 1:00 pm, SECN+	No. 23	Abilene Christian	W 6–1	2–2	Razorback Field (825); Fayetteville, AR
September 1*; 7:00 pm		James Madison	W 2–0	3–2	Razorback Field (1,128); Fayetteville, AR
September 3*; 1:00 pm, SECN+		Mississippi Valley State	W 11–0	4–2	Razorback Field (1,009); Fayetteville, AR
September 7*; 6:00 pm		at Connecticut	L 1–2 ^{AET}	4–3	Morrone Stadium (544); Storrs, CT
September 10*; 11:30 am, COX		at Providence	L 3–4	4–4	Anderson Stadium (750); Providence, RI
September 15; 7:00 pm, SECN+		Mississippi State	W 1–0	5–4 (1–0)	Razorback Field (1,515); Fayetteville, AR
September 17*; 5:00 pm, SECN+		Oral Roberts	W 3–1	6–4 (1–0)	Razorback Field (833); Fayetteville, AR
September 21; 7:00 pm, SECN+		at Vanderbilt	T 0–0 ^{AET}	6–4–1 (1–0–1)	Vanderbilt Soccer Complex (223); Nashville, TN
September 24; 4:00 pm, SEC Net.		No. 20 Ole Miss	L 0–1	6–5–1 (1–1–1)	Razorback Field (940); Fayetteville, AR
September 29; 7:00 pm, SECN+		at No. 23 Texas A&M	L 1–2	6–6–1 (1–2–1)	Ellis Field (3,340); College Station, TX
October 5; 6:00 pm, SEC Net.		at Auburn	W 2–0	7–6–1 (2–2–1)	Auburn Soccer Complex (294); Auburn, AL
October 8; 5:00 pm, ESPNU		No. 3 South Carolina	L 0–2	7–7–1 (2–3–1)	Razorback Field (1,325); Fayetteville, AR
October 13; 7:00 pm, SECN+		at LSU	W 1–0	8–7–1 (3–3–1)	LSU Soccer Stadium (536); Baton Rouge, LA
October 19; 7:00 pm, SECN+		Alabama	L 0–1	8–8–1 (3–4–1)	Razorback Field (1,211); Fayetteville, AR
October 22; 2:00 pm, SECN+		at Kentucky	W 2–0	9–8–1 (4–4–1)	Bell Soccer Complex (1,114); Lexington, KY
October 26; 7:00 pm, SECN+		No. 19 Tennessee	L 2–3	9–9–1 (4–5–1)	Razorback Field (1,441); Fayetteville, AR
SEC Tournament
October 30; 3:30 pm, SECN	(8)	(9) Ole Miss; SEC Tournament First Round	W 1–0	10–9–1 (5–5–1)	Orange Beach Sportsplex; Orange Beach, AL
October 31; 5:00 pm, SECN	(8)	(1) South Carolina; SEC Tournament Quarterfinals	W 1–0	11–9–1 (6–5–1)	Orange Beach Sportsplex; Orange Beach, AL
November 2; 3:30 pm, SECN	(8)	(4) Vanderbilt; SEC Tournament Semifinals	T 1–1 ^{AET} W 4–2 on pens.	11–9–2 (6–5–2)	Orange Beach Sportsplex; Orange Beach, AL
November 5; 2:00 pm, SECN	(8)	(2) Texas A&M; SEC Tournament Final	L 1–2	11–10–2 (6–6–2)	Orange Beach Sportsplex (802); Orange Beach, AL
NCAA Tournament
November 11; 12:00 pm, ACCN+		at NC State; NCAA Tournament First Round	L 1–4	11–11–2 (6–6–2)	Dali Soccer Field (428); Raleigh, NC
*Non-conference game. ^{#}Rankings from United Soccer Coaches. (#) Tournament seedings in parentheses.
