= Atlantic 10 Conference women's soccer tournament =

Atlantic 10 women's soccer tournament
- Conference soccer championship
- Sport: College soccer
- Conference: Atlantic 10 Conference
- Number of teams: 8
- Format: Single-elimination tournament
- Played: 1993–present
- Last contest: 2026
- Current champion: Saint Louis (10th title)
- Most championships: Dayton (11)
- TV partner: ESPN+
- Official website: atlantic10.com/wsoc

The Atlantic 10 Conference women's soccer tournament is the conference championship tournament in women's soccer for the Atlantic 10 Conference (A-10). The tournament has been held every year since 1993. It is a single-elimination tournament, and seeding is based on regular season records.

The winner, declared conference champion, receives the conference's automatic bid to the NCAA Division I women's soccer championship. Historically, six teams qualified for the championship, but in 2012 the tournament expanded to its current eight teams.

Dayton Flyers is the most winning team of the competition with 11 championships won.

== Champions ==
The following is a list of Atlantic 10 Conference Tournament winners:

=== Finals ===
Key

- (1) – Title number
- a.e.t. – Match went to extra time
- p – Match decided by a penalty shootout after extra time
- – Winning team won regular season

Ed.	Year	Champion	Score	Runner-up	Venue/City	MVP	Ref,
1	1993	UMass (1)	2–0	George Washington	Yurcak Field • Piscataway, NJ	Nicole Roberts, UMass	
2	1994	UMass (2)	2–1	George Washington	Garber Field • Amherst, MA	Rebecca Myers, UMass	
3	1995	UMass (3)	6–0	Xavier	Garber Field • Amherst, MA	Rachel LeDuc, UMass	
4	1996	Dayton (1)	3–2	UMass	URI Soccer Complex • Kingston, RI	Julie Wilde, Dayton	
5	1997	UMass (4)	1–0	George Washington	Corcoran Field • Cincinnati, Oh	Erica Iverson, UMass	
6	1998	Xavier (1)	1–1 (4–3 p)	Dayton	Baujan Field • Dayton, Oh	Christie Reinshagen, Xaver	
7	1999	Dayton (2)	1–0	Xavier	Garber Field • Amherst, MA	Annette Gruber, Xavier	
8	2000	Xavier (2)	1–0	Dayton	Corcoran Field • Cincinnati, Oh	Annette Gruber, Xavier	
9	2001	Dayton (3)	2–1	Richmond	URI Soccer Complex • Kingston, RI	Sarah Walker, Dayton	
10	2002	Richmond (1)	3–1	Rhode Island	Baujan Field • Dayton, Oh	Meghan Ogilvie, Rhode Island	
11	2003	Dayton (4)	3–0	Richmond	First Market Stadium • Richmond, Virginia	Shannon Kuhl, Dayton	
12	2004	Dayton (5)	1–0 (a.e.t.)	Rhode Island	Rudd Field • Amherst, MA	Tesla Kozlowski, Dayton	
13	2005	Saint Louis (1)	1–0	Rhode Island	Baujan Field • Dayton, Oh	Abby Goellner, Saint Louis	
14	2006	Saint Louis (2)	2–1	Fordham	Hermann Stadium • St. Louis, MO	Maureen Hughes, Saint Louis	
15	2007	Charlotte (1)	3–2	Fordham	Transamerica Field • Charlotte, NC	Hailey Beam, Charlotte	
16	2008	Charlotte (2)	1–0	Dayton	Hermann Stadium • St. Louis, MO	Hailey Beam, Charlotte	
17	2009	Dayton (6)	2–1	Charlotte	Transamerica Field • Charlotte, NC	Cara Cornacchia, Dayton	
18	2010	Dayton (7)	4–3 (a.e.t.)	Charlotte	URI Soccer Complex • Kingston, RI	Alexis Garcia, Dayton	
19	2011	Dayton (8)	5–1	UMass	Baujan Field • Dayton, Oh	Colleen Williams, Dayton	
20	2012	La Salle (1)	2–1 (a.e.t.)	VCU	URI Soccer Complex • Kingston, RI	Jourdan McVicker, La Salle	
21	2013	La Salle (2)	1–1 (5–4 p)	Dayton	Sports Backers Stadium • Richmond, VA	Renee Washington, La Salle	
22	2014	Dayton (9)	2–1	La Salle	Baujan Field • Dayton, Oh	Erin O'Malley, Dayton	
23	2015	Duquesne (1)	2–0	Fordham	Alumni Soccer Stadium • Davidson, NC	Vanessa Perdomo, Duquesne	
24	2016	Dayton (10)	7–0	Saint Joseph's	URI Soccer Complex • Kingston, RI	Libby Leedom, Dayton	
25	2017	La Salle (3)	1–0 (a.e.t.)	VCU	Sports Backers Stadium • Richmond, VA	Larisa Zambelli, La Salle	
26	2018	Saint Louis (3)	5–1	VCU	Baujan Field • Dayton, Oh	Maddie Pokorny, Saint Louis	
27	2019	Saint Louis (4)	3–1	George Washington	Hermann Stadium • St. Louis, MO	Courtney Reimer, Saint Louis	
28	2020	Saint Louis (5)	2–1	Davidson	Hermann Stadium • St. Louis, MO	Hannah Friedrich, Saint Louis	
29	2021	Saint Louis (6)	4–1	UMass	Baujan Field • Dayton, Oh	Mattyn Summers, Saint Louis	
30	2022	Saint Louis (7)	4–0	Dayton	Hermann Stadium • St. Louis, MO	Lyndsey Heckel, Saint Louis	
31	2023	Saint Louis (8)	3–0	La Salle	Hermann Stadium • St. Louis, MO	Caroline Kelly, Saint Louis	
32	2024	Saint Louis (9)	3–1	UMass	Hermann Stadium • St. Louis, MO	Lyndsey Heckel, Saint Louis	
32	2025	Dayton (11)	0–0 (5–4 p)	Rhode Island	Baujan Field • Dayton, OH	Batoul Reda, Dayton	
33	2026	Saint Louis (10)	2–0	Rhode Island	Hermann Stadium • St. Louis, MO	Audrey Smith, Saint Louis	

=== By school ===
As of 2026 Tournament

School	Apps.	Last App	W	L	T	PCT	Finals	Championships	Title Years
Butler^{†}	1	2012	1	1	0	.500	0	0	—
Charlotte^{†}	8	2012	7	6	0	.538	4	2	2007, 2008
Davidson	3	2024	2	3	0	.400	1	0	—
Dayton	29	2026	40	14	4	.724	17	11	1996, 1999, 2001, 2003, 2004, 2009, 2010, 2011, 2014, 2016, 2025
Duquesne	11	2025	4	9	2	.333	1	1	2015
Fordham	12	2026	5	13	2	.300	3	0	—
George Mason	4	2026	3	6	0	.333	0	0	—
George Washington	13	2026	7	17	0	.292	4	0	—
La Salle	14	2026	16	11	1	.589	5	3	2012, 2013, 2017
Loyola-Chicago	4	2026	0	4	0	.000	0	0	—
Richmond	8	2021	7	7	0	.500	3	1	2002
Rhode Island	12	2026	7	11	1	.395	4	0	—
Saint Joseph's	12	2024	8	14	0	.364	1	0	—
Saint Louis	15	2026	29	6	1	.819	10	10	2005, 2006, 2018, 2019, 2020, 2021, 2022, 2023, 2024, 2026
St. Bonaventure	8	2021	2	8	0	.200	0	0	—
Temple^{†}	3	1995	0	3	0	.000	0	0	—
UMass^{†}	21	2024	16	17	1	.485	8	4	1993, 1994, 1995, 1997
VCU	9	2025	6	11	1	.361	3	0	—
Virginia Tech^{†}	0	—	0	0	0	–	0	0	—
Xavier^{†}	7	2003	7	5	0	.583	4	2	1998, 2000

- ^{†}Former member of the Atlantic 10
