= 2023 Atlantic 10 Conference women's soccer tournament =

American college soccer tournament

- Classification: Division I
- Teams: 8
- Matches: 7
- Attendance: 3,996
- Site: Campus sites, higher seed
- Champions: Saint Louis Billikens (8th title)
- Winning coach: Katie Shields (6th title)
- MVP: Caroline Kelly (Saint Louis Billikens)
- Broadcast: ESPN+

2023 Atlantic 10 Conference women's soccer standings
	Conf.						Overall
Team	W		L		T	PCT	W		L		T	PCT
No. 11 Saint Louis ‍†‍‡‍^{y}	9	–	0	–	1	.950	19	–	3	–	2	.833
La Salle ‍‍‍	8	–	1	–	1	.850	12	–	6	–	3	.643
Dayton ‍‍‍	7	–	0	–	3	.850	13	–	2	–	5	.775
UMass ‍‍‍	6	–	2	–	2	.700	9	–	5	–	4	.611
Duquesne ‍‍‍	4	–	2	–	4	.600	8	–	8	–	4	.500
Rhode Island ‍‍‍	4	–	3	–	3	.550	4	–	9	–	6	.368
Saint Joseph's ‍‍‍	4	–	3	–	3	.550	4	–	9	–	6	.368
VCU ‍‍‍	4	–	4	–	2	.500	5	–	9	–	4	.389
Loyola Chicago ‍‍‍	3	–	3	–	4	.500	7	–	7	–	4	.500
Fordham ‍‍‍	2	–	5	–	3	.350	4	–	10	–	4	.333
George Mason ‍‍‍	3	–	7	–	0	.300	3	–	15	–	0	.167
St. Bonaventure ‍‍‍	2	–	6	–	2	.300	3	–	8	–	6	.353
Davidson ‍‍‍	1	–	7	–	2	.200	4	–	11	–	2	.294
George Washington ‍‍‍	1	–	8	–	1	.150	4	–	11	–	3	.306
Richmond ‍‍‍	1	–	8	–	1	.150	3	–	11	–	4	.278
† – Conference champion ‡ – 2023 Atlantic 10 Tournament champion y – Invited to the NCAA Tournament; As of December 7, 2023; Rankings from United Soccer Coaches Poll; Source: A10 Conference

The 2023 Atlantic 10 Conference women's soccer tournament was the postseason women's soccer tournament for the Atlantic 10 Conference held from October 27 through November 5, 2023. The quarterfinals of the tournament were held at campus sites, while the semifinals and final took place at the home stadium of the highest remaining seed. The eight-team single-elimination tournament consisted of three rounds based on seeding from regular season conference play. The defending tournament champions were the Saint Louis Billikens, who successfully defended their championship as the first seed, defeating second seed La Salle in the final. This was the Billikens' eighth overall tournament title, and coach Katie Shields' fifth title. Shields and Saint Louis have won six straight Atlantic 10 Tournaments in a row. As tournament champions, Saint Louis earned the Atlantic 10's automatic berth into the 2023 NCAA Division I women's soccer tournament.

== Seeding ==
The top eight teams in regular season play qualified for the tournament. A tiebreaker was required to determine the sixth and seventh seeds as Saint Joseph's and Rhode Island both finished with 4–3–3 conference records. The two teams tied 0–0 during regular season play. The second tiebreaker of conference record against common opponents was the second tiebreaker and Saint Joseph's was awarded the sixth seed.

Seed	School	Conference Record	Points
1	Saint Louis	9–0–1	28
2	La Salle	8–1–1	25
3	Dayton	7–0–3	24
4	UMass	6–2–2	20
5	Duquesne	4–2–4	16
6	Saint Joseph's	4–3–3	15
7	Rhode Island	4–3–3	15
8	VCU	4–4–2	14

== Bracket ==
Quarterfinals; Friday, October 27
1	Saint Louis	2
8	VCU	0
4	UMass	1
5	Duquesne	2
(Pairings are reseeded after the first round)
2	La Salle	2
7	Rhode Island	0
3	Dayton	1
6	Saint Joseph's	0

Semifinals; Wednesday, November 1
1	Saint Louis	5
5	Duquesne	0
2	La Salle (a.e.t.)	1
3	Dayton	0

Final; Sunday, November 5
1	Saint Louis	3
2	La Salle	0

== Schedule ==
=== Quarterfinals ===
October 27	#1 Saint Louis	2–0	#8 VCU	St. Louis, MO
8:00 p.m. ET	Lyndsey Heckel 1'; Emily Gaebe 37', (yellow card) 57'; Katie Houck (yellow card) 78'	Report		Stadium: Hermann Stadium; Attendance: 724; Referee: Aaron Rawlins; Assistant referees: Andric Stefan; Noah Stuckey; Fourth official: Chad Formea

October 27	#4 UMass	1–2	#5 Duquesne	Amherst, MA
2:00 p.m. ET	Lauren Robles 30'	Report	13', 30' Maya Matesa; (yellow card) 62' Anna Campanella	Stadium: Rudd Field; Attendance: 762; Referee: Matthew Mercier; Assistant referees: Danny Marques; Kurtis Blake; Fourth official: Jason Klump

October 27	#2 La Salle	2–0	#7 Rhode Island	Philadelphia, PA
7:00 p.m. ET	Haley Gschrey 74'; Emily Banashefski 77'	Report		Stadium: McCarthy Stadium; Attendance: 238; Referee: Mike De Felice; Assistant referees: Juri Siskin; Joseph Cimino; Fourth official: Dustin Nguyen

October 27	#3 Dayton	1–0	#6 Saint Joseph's	Dayton, OH
7:00 p.m. ET	Team (yellow card) 54'; Madison Wilson 87'	Report	(yellow card) 38' Leah Buch	Stadium: Baujan Field; Attendance: 371; Referee: Sorin Stoica; Assistant referees: Erin Patterson; Kyle Maust; Fourth official: Mikael Lundqvist

=== Semifinals ===
November 1	#1 Saint Louis	5–0	#5 Duquesne	St. Louis, MO
8:00 p.m. ET	Duquesne Own Goal 21'; Hannah Sawyer 38', 75', (yellow card) 79'; Julia Simon 39'; Caroline Kelly 47'; Macy Lutz (yellow card) 70'	Report	(yellow card) 33' Anna Campanella; (yellow card) 45' Maya Matesa	Stadium: Hermann Stadium; Attendance: 445; Referee: Zachary Richter; Assistant referees: Jeff Pulley; Jeff Patrylo; Fourth official: Don Tebeau

November 1	#2 La Salle	1–0 (a.e.t.)	#3 Dayton	Philadelphia, PA
7:00 p.m. ET	Courtney Gaston (yellow card) 35'; Gabby Picco (yellow card) 54'; Madison McCreday (yellow card) 69'; Haley Gschrey 97'; Ricshya Walker (yellow card) 100'	Report	(yellow card) 43' Ella Raimondi; (yellow card) 100' Marlee Taylor	Stadium: McCarthy Stadium; Attendance: 432; Referee: Marie Durr; Assistant referees: Randal Von Steuben; Kevin Rodrigo; Fourth official: Rob Komorowski

=== Final ===
November 5	#1 Saint Louis	3–0	#2 La Salle	St. Louis, MO
11:00 a.m. ET	Caroline Kelly 14', 57'; Emily Gaebe 28'; Alyssa Bockius (yellow card) 65'	Report	(yellow card) 14' Giovanna Castorina; (yellow card) 21' Liv Vrcella; (yellow card) 22' Team; (yellow card) 49' Haley Gschrey; (yellow card) 77' Ricshya Walker	Stadium: Hermann Stadium; Attendance: 1,024; Referee: Sergio Gonzalez; Assistant referees: Adam Drees; Stephen Valle; Fourth official: Joseph Heyden

== Statistics ==
=== Goalscorers ===
There were 17 goals scored in 7 matches, for an average of 2.43 goals per match (as of November 5, 2023).

3 goals

- Caroline Kelly – Saint Louis

2 goals

- Maya Matesa – Duquesne
- Haley Gschrey – La Salle
- Emily Gaebe – Saint Louis
- Hannah Sawyer – Saint Louis

1 goal

- Madison Wilson – Dayton
- Emily Banashefski – La Salle
- Lyndsey Heckel – Saint Louis
- Julia Simon – Saint Louis
- Lauren Robles – UMass

1 own goal

- Duquesne (vs Saint Louis)

== All Tournament Team ==
Player	Team
Emily Gaebe	Saint Louis
Lyndsey Heckel	Saint Louis
**Caroline Kelly**	Saint Louis
Hannah Larson	Saint Louis
Emily Puricelli	Saint Louis
Hannah Sawyer	Saint Louis
Michela Auguadro	La Salle
Emily Banashefski	La Salle
Haley Gschrey	La Salle
Madison Wilson	Dayton
Maya Matesa	Duquesne

MVP in bold
