= 2024 Atlantic 10 Conference women's soccer tournament =

American college soccer tournament

- Classification: Division I
- Teams: 8
- Matches: 7
- Attendance: 4,698
- Site: Campus sites, higher seed
- Champions: Saint Louis Billikens (9th title)
- Winning coach: Katie Shields (7th title)
- MVP: Emily Gaebe (Saint Louis Billikens)
- Broadcast: ESPN+

2024 Atlantic 10 Conference women's soccer standings
| | Conf. | | | | | | Overall |
| Team | W | | L | | T | PCT | W | | L | | T | PCT |
|---|---|---|---|---|---|---|---|---|---|---|---|---|
| No. 22 Saint Louis ‍†‍‡‍^{y} | 7 | – | 0 | – | 3 | .850 | 15 | – | 2 | – | 6 | .783 |
| Dayton ‍‍‍ | 7 | – | 1 | – | 2 | .800 | 14 | – | 4 | – | 2 | .750 |
| UMass ‍‍‍ | 6 | – | 2 | – | 2 | .700 | 13 | – | 5 | – | 3 | .690 |
| Fordham ‍‍‍ | 5 | – | 2 | – | 3 | .650 | 10 | – | 5 | – | 4 | .632 |
| Saint Joseph's ‍‍‍ | 4 | – | 1 | – | 5 | .650 | 9 | – | 4 | – | 7 | .625 |
| Loyola-Chicago ‍‍‍ | 4 | – | 2 | – | 4 | .600 | 9 | – | 5 | – | 5 | .605 |
| VCU ‍‍‍ | 3 | – | 2 | – | 5 | .550 | 4 | – | 9 | – | 5 | .361 |
| Davidson ‍‍‍ | 4 | – | 5 | – | 1 | .450 | 8 | – | 8 | – | 3 | .500 |
| Rhode Island ‍‍‍ | 4 | – | 5 | – | 1 | .450 | 7 | – | 8 | – | 3 | .472 |
| LaSalle ‍‍‍ | 3 | – | 4 | – | 3 | .450 | 8 | – | 5 | – | 5 | .583 |
| Duquesne ‍‍‍ | 3 | – | 6 | – | 1 | .350 | 8 | – | 7 | – | 1 | .531 |
| George Mason ‍‍‍ | 1 | – | 5 | – | 4 | .300 | 3 | – | 10 | – | 6 | .316 |
| George Washington ‍‍‍ | 2 | – | 7 | – | 1 | .250 | 4 | – | 11 | – | 3 | .306 |
| Richmond ‍‍‍ | 2 | – | 7 | – | 1 | .250 | 4 | – | 10 | – | 3 | .324 |
| St. Bonaventure ‍‍‍ | 1 | – | 7 | – | 2 | .200 | 2 | – | 13 | – | 3 | .194 |
† – Conference champion ‡ – 2024 Atlantic 10 Tournament champion y – Invited to the NCAA Tournament; As of December 10, 2024; Rankings from United Soccer Coaches Poll; Source:A10 Conference

The 2024 Atlantic 10 Conference women's soccer tournament was the postseason women's soccer tournament for the Atlantic 10 Conference held from November 1 through November 10, 2024. All matches took place at on the campus of the higher seeded team. The eight-team single-elimination tournament consisted of three rounds based on seeding from regular season conference play. The defending tournament champions were the Saint Louis Billikens, who successfully defended their championship as the first seed, defeating UMass in the Final 3–1. This was the Billikens' ninth overall tournament title, and coach Katie Shields' seventh title. Shields and Saint Louis have won seven straight Atlantic 10 Tournaments in a row. As tournament champions, Saint Louis earned the Atlantic 10's automatic berth into the 2024 NCAA Division I women's soccer tournament.

== Seeding ==
The top eight teams in regular season play qualified for the tournament. Teams were seeded based on regular season conference records. A tiebreaker was needed to determine the eighth and final seed in the tournament as Davidson and Rhode Island both finished with 4–5–1 regular season records. The two teams met on October 27, the final day of the regular season and Davidson prevailed 2–0 in the de-facto play in game. Therefore Davidson qualified for the tournament as the eighth seed, and Rhode Island did not qualify for the tournament.

| Seed | School | Conference Record | Points |
|---|---|---|---|
| 1 | Saint Louis | 7–0–3 | 24 |
| 2 | Dayton | 7–1–2 | 23 |
| 3 | UMass | 6–2–2 | 20 |
| 4 | Fordham | 5–2–3 | 18 |
| 5 | Saint Joseph's | 4–1–5 | 17 |
| 6 | Loyola-Chicago | 4–2–4 | 16 |
| 7 | VCU | 3–2–5 | 14 |
| 8 | Davidson | 4–5–1 | 13 |

== Bracket ==
Quarterfinals; Friday, November 1 Saturday, November 2
1 | Saint Louis | 2
8 | Davidson | 0
4 | Fordham | 1
5 | Saint Joseph's | 2
(Pairings are reseeded after the first round)
2 | Dayton | 1
7 | VCU | 0
3 | UMass | 1
6 | Loyola-Chicago | 0

Semifinals; Wednesday, November 6
1 | Saint Louis | 2
5 | Saint Joseph's | 0
2 | Dayton | 1
3 | UMass | 2

Final; Sunday, November 10
1 | Saint Louis | 3
3 | UMass | 1

== Schedule ==
=== Quarterfinals ===
| November 1, 2024 | #2 Dayton | 1–0 | #7 VCU | Dayton, OH |
| 7:00 p.m. EDT | Laney Smith 11' | Report | (yellow card) 39' Jenna Eller; (yellow card) 72' Milica Bulatovic | Stadium: Baujan Field; Attendance: 452 |

| November 1, 2024 | #4 Fordham | 1–2 | #5 Saint Joseph's | Bronx, NY |
| 7:00 p.m. EDT | Fernanda Serna (yellow card) 86'; Riley Carroll 90' | Report | (yellow card) 13' Sarah Fisher; 24' Emily Hanrahan; (yellow card) 33' Rachel Brown; 40' Chloe Khelil | Stadium: Moglia Stadium; Attendance: 492; Referee: Nathaniel Hirschman; Assistant referees: Hector Rudea; Colby Johnson; Fourth official: Jan Halaska |

| November 2, 2024 | #3 UMass | 1–0 | #6 Loyola-Chicago | Amherst, MA |
| 1:00 p.m. EDT | Ella Curry 9' | Report | (yellow card) 44' Taylor Harrison | Stadium: Rudd Field; Attendance: 852; Referee: Sean Lyons; Assistant referees: Robert Briones; Michele Beagan; Fourth official: Victor Matheson |

| November 2, 2024 | #1 Saint Louis | 2–0 | #8 Davidson | St. Louis, MO |
| 5:00 p.m. CDT | Lucie Schwartz 9'; Lyndsey Heckel 59' (pen.) | Report | | Stadium: Hermann Stadium; Attendance: 600; Referee: Aaron Rawlins; Assistant referees: Adam Drees; Jeff Patrylo; Fourth official: Braeden Frey |

=== Semifinals ===
| November 6, 2024 | #1 Saint Louis | 2–0 | #5 Saint Joseph's | St. Louis, MO |
| 7:00 p.m. CST | Julia Simon 21'; Emily Gaebe 63' | Report | (yellow card) 55' Emily Hanrahan; (yellow card) 55' Hannah Larson | Stadium: Hermann Stadium; Attendance: 559; Referee: William DeLois; Assistant referees: Colin Pressy; Michael Heath; Fourth official: Justin Tomicich |

| November 6, 2024 | #2 Dayton | 1–2 | #3 UMass | Dayton, OH |
| 7:00 p.m. EST | UMass Own Goal 43'; Team (yellow card) 80' | Report | 14' Karina Groff; (yellow card) 54' Kelly Pease; (yellow card) 80' Ashley Lamond; 89' Emma Pedolzky | Stadium: Baujan Field; Attendance: 486; Referee: Austin Saini; Assistant referees: Erin Patterson; Andry Castel; Fourth official: Sarah Pierce |

=== Final ===
| November 10, 2024 | #1 Saint Louis | 3–1 | #3 UMass | St. Louis, MO |
| 12:00 p.m. CST | 13', 90' Emily Gaebe; 74' Lyndsey Heckel | Report | 37' Bella Recinos; (yellow card) 50' Ella Curry; (yellow card) 82' Team | Stadium: Hermann Stadium; Attendance: 1,257; Referee: Mandy Love; Assistant referees: Stephen Valle; Alexander Eberding; Fourth official: Andrew Strasberg |

== Statistics ==
=== Goalscorers ===
There were 16 goals scored in 7 matches, for an average of 2.29 goals per match (as of November 10, 2024).

3 goals

- Emily Gaebe – Saint Louis

2 goals

- Lyndsey Heckel – Saint Louis

1 goal

- Riley Carroll – Fordham
- Ella Curry – UMass
- Karina Groff – UMass
- Emily Hanrahan – Saint Joseph's
- Chloe Khelil – Saint Joseph's
- Emma Pedolzky – UMass
- Bella Recinos – UMass
- Lucie Schwartz – Saint Louis
- Julia Simon – Saint Louis
- Laney Smith – Dayton

1 own goal

- UMass (vs Dayton)

== All Tournament Team ==
| Player | Team |
|---|---|
| Riley Kerber | Dayton |
| Katie Cappelletti | Saint Joseph's |
| **Emily Gaebe** | Saint Louis |
| Lyndsey Heckel | Saint Louis |
| Katie Houck | Saint Louis |
| Hannah Larson | Saint Louis |
| Emily Puricelli | Saint Louis |
| Lucie Schwartz | Saint Louis |
| Emma Pedolsky | UMass |
| Bella Recinos | UMass |
| Julianna Ryan | UMass |

MVP in bold
