= 2021 Atlantic 10 Conference women's soccer tournament =

- Classification: Division I
- Teams: 8
- Matches: 7
- Attendance: 3,153
- Site: Baujan Field; Dayton, Ohio
- Champions: Saint Louis Billikens (6th title)
- Winning coach: Katie Shields (4th title)
- MVP: Mattyn Summers (Saint Louis)
- Broadcast: ESPN+

2021 Atlantic 10 Conference women's soccer standings
	Conf.						Overall
Team	W		L		T	PCT	W		L		T	PCT
VCU ‍†‍‍	9	–	1	–	0	.900	13	–	4	–	0	.765
Dayton ‍‍‍	8	–	2	–	0	.800	12	–	6	–	2	.650
Saint Louis ‍‍‡‍^{y}	7	–	3	–	0	.700	13	–	9	–	1	.587
UMass ‍‍‍	5	–	3	–	2	.600	11	–	6	–	4	.619
St. Bonaventure ‍‍‍	5	–	4	–	1	.550	7	–	8	–	4	.474
Rhode Island ‍‍‍	5	–	4	–	1	.550	6	–	9	–	2	.412
Richmond ‍‍‍	5	–	5	–	0	.500	7	–	10	–	1	.417
Saint Joseph's ‍‍‍	5	–	5	–	0	.500	6	–	12	–	2	.350
La Salle ‍‍‍	4	–	5	–	1	.450	6	–	9	–	2	.412
George Mason ‍‍‍	4	–	5	–	1	.450	6	–	11	–	1	.361
George Washington ‍‍‍	3	–	6	–	1	.350	3	–	12	–	2	.235
Duquesne ‍‍‍	2	–	7	–	1	.250	4	–	10	–	2	.313
Fordham ‍‍‍	2	–	7	–	1	.250	4	–	12	–	2	.278
Davidson ‍‍‍	0	–	7	–	3	.150	4	–	10	–	4	.333
† – Conference champion ‡ – 2021 Atlantic 10 Tournament champion y – Invited to the NCAA tournament As of December 7, 2021; Rankings from United Soccer Coaches Poll; Source:A10 Conference

The 2021 Atlantic 10 Conference women's soccer tournament was the postseason women's soccer tournament for the Atlantic 10 Conference held from October 30 through November 7, 2021. The quarterfinals of the tournament were held at campus sites, while the semifinals and final took place at Baujan Field in Dayton, Ohio. The eight-team single-elimination tournament consisted of three rounds based on seeding from regular season conference play. The defending tournament champions were the Saint Louis Billikens, who successfully defended their championship as the third seed, defeating fourth seed UMass in the final. This was the Billikens' sixth overall tournament title, and coach Katie Shields' fourth title. Shields and Saint Louis have won four straight Atlantic 10 Tournaments in a row. As tournament champions, Saint Louis earned the Atlantic 10's automatic berth into the 2021 NCAA Division I Women's Soccer Tournament.

== Bracket ==
Quarterfinals; Oct. 30-31
1	VCU	0
8	Saint Joseph's	1
4	UMass	5
5	St. Bonaventure	1
2	Dayton	3
7	Richmond	1
3	Saint Louis (a.e.t.)	2
6	Rhode Island	1

Semifinals; Friday, Nov. 5
8	Saint Joseph's	0
4	UMass	2
2	Dayton	2
3	Saint Louis	4

Final; Sunday, Nov. 7
4	UMass	1
3	Saint Louis	4

== Schedule ==
=== Quarterfinals ===
October 30, 2021	#3 Saint Louis	2–1 (a.e.t.)	#6 Rhode Island	St. Louis, MO
2:00 p.m. CT	Brionna Halverson 86'; Lyndsey Heckel 103'	Report	53' Claire Ross; (yellow card) 79' Kelly Fitzgerald	Stadium: Hermann Stadium; Attendance: 648; Referee: Velimir Milovic; Assistant referees: Don Huber; Saul Gonzalez; Fourth official: Vernon Gano

October 30, 2021	#1 VCU	0–1	#8 Saint Joseph's	Richmond, VA
7:00 p.m. EST		Report	3' Erica Behr; (yellow card) 68' Izzy Greene	Stadium: Sports Backers Stadium; Attendance: 375; Referee: Shaun Papperman; Assistant referees: Anthony Tribotti; James Conlee; Fourth official: Spencer Adamson

October 31, 2021	#2 Dayton	3–1	#7 Richmond	Dayton, OH
1:00 p.m. ET	Marlee Taylor 6'; Laney Huber 62'; Itala Gemelli 87'	Report	25' Emma Coleman; (yellow card) 40' Catie Groves; (yellow card) 89' Gianna Lucchesi	Stadium: Baujan Field; Attendance: 503; Referee: Eric Tattersall; Assistant referees: Tre Gaither; Benjamin Travini; Fourth official: Doug Palomaki

October 31, 2021	#4 UMass	5–1	#5 St. Bonaventure	Amherst, MA
1:00 p.m. ET	Ashley Lamond 12'; Serena Ahmed 30'; Mia Carazza 56'; Olivia Gouldsbury 84'; Lauren Robles 90'	Report	5' McKenna Robinson; (yellow card) 76' Christine Napoli	Stadium: Rudd Field; Attendance: 379; Referee: Daniel Shenk-Moreno; Assistant referees: Michele Beagan; Katherine Mitchell-Moreno; Fourth official: Jeff Ardis

=== Semifinals ===
November 5, 2021	#4 UMass	2–0	#8 Saint Joseph's	Dayton, OH
1:00 p.m. ET	Ashley Lamond 21'; Lauren Bonavita 65', (yellow card) 90'	Report		Stadium: Baujan Field; Attendance: 143

November 5, 2021	#2 Dayton	2–4	#3 Saint Louis	Dayton, OH
4:00 p.m. ET	Laney Huber 6'; Alexa Holl 37'	Report	1' (o.g.) Own Goal; 28' Caroline Kelly; (yellow card) 34' Anna Walsh; 50' Mattyn Summers; 52' (o.g.) Own Goal	Stadium: Baujan Field; Attendance: 538

=== Final ===
November 7, 2021	#3 Saint Louis	4–1	#4 UMass	Dayton, OH
Noon ET	Hannah Friedrich 28'; Lyndsey Heckel 61'; Emily Gaebe 68'; Abbie Miller 75'	Report	54' Ashley Lamond	Stadium: Baujan Field; Attendance: 567; Referee: Ashley Cedro; Assistant referees: Tre Gaither; Anthony Frizzell; Fourth official: Kendra Dalton-Landrum

== Statistics ==
=== Goalscorers ===
There were 27 goals scored in 7 matches, for an average of 3.86 goals per match (as of November 7, 2021).

3 goals

- Ashley Lamond – UMass

2 goals

- Laney Huber – Dayton
- Lyndsey Heckel – Saint Louis

1 goal

- Itala Gemelli – Dayton
- Alexa Holl – Dayton
- Marlee Taylor – Dayton
- Claire Ross – Rhode Island
- Emma Coleman – Richmond
- McKenna Robinson – Saint Bonaventure
- Erica Behr – Saint Joseph's
- Hannah Friedrich – Saint Louis
- Emily Gaebe – Saint Louis
- Brionna Halverson – Saint Louis
- Caroline Kelly – Saint Louis
- Abbie Miller – Saint Louis
- Mattyn Summers – Saint Louis
- Serena Ahmed – UMass
- Lauren Bonavita – UMass
- Mia Carazza – UMass
- Olivia Gouldsbury – UMass
- Lauren Robles – UMass

2 own goals

- Dayton (Against Saint Louis)
- Dayton (Against Saint Louis)

== All Tournament Team ==
Player	Team
**Mattyn Summers**	Saint Louis
Emily Puricelli	Saint Louis
Hannah Friedrich	Saint Louis
Lyndsey Heckel	Saint Louis
Caroline Kelly	Saint Louis
Brionna Halverson	Saint Louis
Ashley Lamond	UMass
Bella Recinos	UMass
Ava Jouvenal	UMass
Fiona Kane	UMass
Laney Huber	Dayton

MVP in bold
