= 2022 Atlantic 10 Conference women's soccer tournament =

- Classification: Division I
- Teams: 8
- Matches: 7
- Attendance: 6,660
- Site: Campus sites, higher seed
- Champions: Saint Louis Billikens (7th title)
- Winning coach: Katie Shields (5th title)
- MVP: Lyndsey Heckel (Saint Louis Billikens)
- Broadcast: ESPN+

2022 Atlantic 10 Conference women's soccer standings
	Conf.						Overall
Team	W		L		T	PCT	W		L		T	PCT
No. 20 Saint Louis ‍†‍‡‍^{y}	10	–	0	–	0	1.000	20	–	2	–	0	.909
Dayton ‍‍‍	8	–	2	–	0	.800	16	–	4	–	1	.786
VCU ‍‍‍	6	–	1	–	3	.750	8	–	3	–	8	.632
Davidson ‍‍‍	5	–	2	–	3	.650	13	–	3	–	4	.750
Duquesne ‍‍‍	4	–	3	–	3	.550	6	–	7	–	3	.469
Saint Joseph's ‍‍‍	3	–	2	–	5	.550	5	–	8	–	7	.425
UMass ‍‍‍	4	–	4	–	2	.500	5	–	9	–	5	.395
Loyola-Chicago ‍‍‍	4	–	5	–	1	.450	8	–	8	–	3	.500
Fordham ‍‍‍	4	–	5	–	1	.450	5	–	11	–	1	.324
LaSalle ‍‍‍	3	–	6	–	1	.350	8	–	8	–	2	.500
George Washington ‍‍‍	2	–	5	–	3	.350	7	–	5	–	6	.556
Rhode Island ‍‍‍	2	–	5	–	3	.350	3	–	9	–	6	.333
Richmond ‍‍‍	2	–	5	–	3	.350	3	–	10	–	4	.294
George Mason ‍‍‍	0	–	5	–	5	.250	1	–	10	–	7	.250
St. Bonaventure ‍‍‍	1	–	8	–	1	.150	3	–	8	–	6	.353
† – Conference champion ‡ – 2022 Atlantic 10 Tournament champion y – Invited to the NCAA Tournament; As of December 6, 2022; Rankings from United Soccer Coaches Poll; Source:A10 Conference

The 2022 Atlantic 10 Conference women's soccer tournament was the postseason women's soccer tournament for the Atlantic 10 Conference held from October 28 through November 6, 2022. The quarterfinals of the tournament were held at campus sites, while the semifinals and final took place at the home stadium of the higher remaining seed. The eight-team single-elimination tournament consisted of three rounds based on seeding from regular season conference play. The defending tournament champions were the Saint Louis Billikens, who successfully defended their championship as the first seed, defeating second seed Dayton in the final. This was the Billikens' seventh overall tournament title, and coach Katie Shields' fourth title. Shields and Saint Louis have won five straight Atlantic 10 Tournaments in a row. As tournament champions, Saint Louis earned the Atlantic 10's automatic berth into the 2022 NCAA Division I women's soccer tournament.

== Seeding ==
The top eight teams in regular season play qualified for the tournament. Two sets of tiebreakers were needed to determine final seeding for the tournament. The first tiebreaker was between Saint Joseph's and UMass for the sixth and seventh seeds as both teams finished with fourteen points in conference play. Saint Joseph's earned the sixth seed for the tournament by virtue of a better composite record versus common conference opponents. The second tiebreaker determined which team finished eighth and made the tournament versus which team finished ninth and did not qualify for the tournament. Loyola-Chicago and Fordham both finished with 4–5–1 regular season conference records. Again, composite record versus common conference opponents was used as the tiebreaker and Loyola-Chicago earned the eighth and final seed to the tournament.

Seed	School	Conference Record	Points
1	Saint Louis	10–0–0	30
2	Dayton	8–2–0	24
3	VCU	6–1–3	24
4	Davidson	5–2–3	18
5	Duquesne	4–3–3	15
6	Saint Joseph's	3–2–5	14
7	UMass	4–4–2	14
8	Loyola-Chicago	4–5–1	13

== Bracket ==
Quarterfinals; Friday, October 28–29
1	Saint Louis	3
8	Loyola-Chicago	0
4	Davidson	2
5	Duquesne	0
(Pairings are reseeded after the first round)
2	Dayton	2
7	UMass	0
3	VCU	0
6	Saint Joseph's	1

Semifinals; Wednesday, November 2
1	Saint Louis	2
6	Saint Joseph's	0
2	Dayton	1
4	Davidson	0

Final; Sunday, November 6
1	Saint Louis	4
2	Dayton	0

== Schedule ==
=== Quarterfinals ===
October 28	#2 Dayton	2–0	#7 UMass	Dayton, OH
7:00 p.m. ET	Itala Gemelli 5'; Mia Perri (yellow card) 30'; Alicia Donley 59'	Report		Stadium: Baujan Field; Attendance: 582; Referee: Maggie Short; Assistant referees: Khary Williams; Courtney Hayworth; Fourth official: Brian Apwisch

October 28	#3 VCU	0–1	#6 Saint Joseph's	Richmond, VA
7:00 p.m. ET		Report	31' Natalie Nevins	Stadium: Sports Backers Stadium; Attendance: 279; Referee: Karl Kummer; Assistant referees: Kohl Peasley; Matthew Masciangelo; Fourth official: Julie Heiry

October 28	#4 Davidson	2–0	#5 Duquesne	Davidson, NC
7:00 p.m. ET	Remi White 18'; Maddie Moody 42'; Keeley Copper (yellow card) 78'	Report	(yellow card) 42' Ashley Rodriguez; (yellow card) 78' Sarah Wilkinson; (yellow card) 83' Team	Stadium: Alumni Stadium; Attendance: 805

October 29	#1 Saint Louis	3–0	#8 Loyola-Chicago	St. Louis, MO
2:00 p.m. ET	Lyndsey Heckel 50', 56'; Hannah Sawyer 69'	Report		Stadium: Hermann Stadium; Attendance: 717; Referee: Andy Ellsworth; Assistant referees: Kurt Wuebbels; Justin Tomicich; Fourth official: Don Tebeau

=== Semifinals ===
November 2	#2 Dayton	1–0	#4 Davidson	Dayton, OH
7:00 p.m. ET	Diana Benigno 24'	Report	Keeley Copper (yellow card) 38'; Grace Voss (yellow card) 79'	Stadium: Baujan Field; Attendance: 677; Referee: Cory Richardson; Assistant referees: Courtney Hayworth; Jason Gordon; Fourth official: Mikael Lundqvist

November 2	#1 Saint Louis	2–0	#6 Saint Joseph's	St. Louis, MO
8:00 p.m. ET	Abbie Miller 6' (pen.); Hannah Sawyer (yellow card) 65'; Caroline Kelly 71' (pen.)	Report		Stadium: Hermann Stadium; Attendance: 724; Referee: William DeLois; Assistant referees: Justin Tomicich; Don Tebeau; Fourth official: Jeff Patrylo

=== Final ===
November 6	#1 Saint Louis	4–0	#2 Dayton	St. Louis, MO
1:00 p.m. ET	Hannah Larson 20'; Emily Gaebe 43'; Hannah Friedrich 53'; Lyndsey Heckel (yellow card) 70'; Caroline Kelly 86'	Report		Stadium: Hermann Stadium; Attendance: 2,876; Referee: Leah Hayes; Assistant referees: Matthew Geringer; Matthew Rodman; Fourth official: Matthew Stein

== Statistics ==
=== Goalscorers ===
There were 15 goals scored in 7 matches, for an average of 2.14 goals per match (as of November 6, 2021).

2 goals

- Lyndsey Heckel – Saint Louis
- Caroline Kelly – Saint Louis

1 goal

- Maddie Moody – Davidson
- Remi White – Davidson
- Diana Benigno – Dayton
- Alicia Donley – Dayton
- Itala Gemelli – Dayton
- Natalie Nevins – Saint Joseph's
- Hannah Friedrich – Saint Louis
- Emily Gaebe – Saint Louis
- Hannah Larson – Saint Louis
- Abbie Miller – Saint Louis
- Hannah Sawyer – Saint Louis

== All Tournament Team ==
Player	Team
**Lyndsey Heckel**	Saint Louis
Emily Groark	Saint Louis
Hannah Larson	Saint Louis
Caroline Kelly	Saint Louis
Sophia Stram	Saint Louis
Katie Houk	Saint Louis
Brianna Halverson	Saint Louis
Italia Gemelli	Dayton
Diana Benigno	Dayton
Batoul Reda	Dayton
Katie Cappelletti	Saint Joseph's

MVP in bold
