= 2016 Atlantic 10 Conference women's soccer season =

Atlantic 10 Conference
- Season: 2016

2016 Atlantic 10 Conference women's soccer standings
	Conf.						Overall
Team	W		L		T	PCT	W		L		T	PCT
Saint Joseph's ‍†‍‍	9	–	0	–	1	.950	18	–	2	–	2	.864
Saint Louis ‍‍‍	7	–	1	–	2	.800	14	–	4	–	2	.750
Duquesne ‍‍‍	7	–	2	–	1	.750	11	–	6	–	3	.625
Fordham ‍‍‍	5	–	1	–	4	.700	10	–	5	–	5	.625
George Mason ‍‍‍	6	–	3	–	1	.650	13	–	7	–	1	.643
George Washington ‍‍‍	4	–	3	–	3	.550	11	–	7	–	3	.595
Dayton ‍‍‡‍^{y}	4	–	4	–	2	.500	9	–	10	–	3	.477
Rhode Island ‍‍‍	3	–	4	–	3	.450	6	–	8	–	5	.447
Richmond ‍‍‍	4	–	6	–	0	.400	9	–	9	–	1	.500
VCU ‍‍‍	4	–	6	–	0	.400	8	–	10	–	1	.447
LaSalle ‍‍‍	2	–	4	–	4	.400	4	–	10	–	4	.333
UMass ‍‍‍	1	–	7	–	2	.200	3	–	11	–	3	.265
Davidson ‍‍‍	1	–	8	–	1	.150	5	–	13	–	1	.289
St. Bonaventure ‍‍‍	1	–	9	–	0	.100	4	–	14	–	1	.237
† – Conference champion ‡ – 2016 Atlantic 10 Tournament champion y – Invited to the NCAA tournament As of 2016-11-17; Rankings from NSCAA

The 2016 Atlantic 10 Conference women's soccer season was the 21st season of women's varsity soccer in the conference.

== Changes from 2015 ==
- None

== Teams ==
=== Stadia and locations ===
Team	Location	Stadium	Capacity
Davidson Wildcats	Davidson, North Carolina	Alumni Stadium	2,000
Dayton Flyers	Dayton, Ohio	Baujan Field	2,000
Duquesne Dukes	Pittsburgh, Pennsylvania	Rooney Field	2,200
Fordham Rams	Bronx, New York	Coffey Field	8,000
George Mason Patriots	Fairfax, Virginia	George Mason Stadium	5,000
George Washington Colonials	Washington, D.C.	Mount Vernon Athletic Complex	1,000
La Salle Explorers	Philadelphia, Pennsylvania	McCarthy Stadium	7,500
UMass Minutemen	Amherst, Massachusetts	Rudd Field	800
Richmond Spiders	Richmond, Virginia	Robins Stadium	8,700
Rhode Island Rams	Kingston, Rhode Island	URI Soccer Complex	1,547
St. Bonaventure Bonnies	St. Bonaventure, New York	McGraw-Jennings Field	2,000
Saint Joseph's Hawks	Philadelphia, Pennsylvania	Finnesey Field	600
Saint Louis Billikens	St. Louis, Missouri	Hermann Stadium	6,050
VCU Rams	Richmond, Virginia	Sports Backers Stadium	3,250

- Richmond does not sponsor men's soccer

== Regular season ==
=== Rankings ===
Legend
Increase in ranking
Decrease in ranking
Not ranked previous week

		Pre	Wk 2	Wk 3	Wk 4	Wk 5	Wk 6	Wk 7	Wk 8	Wk 9	Wk 10	Wk 11	Wk 12	Wk 13	Final
Davidson	C														
Dayton	C														
Duquesne	C														
Fordham	C														
George Mason	C														
George Washington	C														
La Salle	C														
UMass	C														
Rhode Island	C														
Richmond	C														
Saint Louis	C														
St. Joseph's	C														
St. Bonaventure	C														
VCU	C														

== Postseason ==
=== A10 tournament ===
Semifinals
1	St. Joseph's	5
4	George Mason	2
7	Dayton	2
6	George Washington	0

Final
1	St. Joseph's	0
6	Dayton	7

=== NCAA tournament ===
Seed	Region	School	1st round	2nd round	3rd round	Quarterfinals	Semifinals	Championship
	West Virginia	Dayton	L 2–3 vs. Ohio State – (Columbus, OH)					

== All-A10 awards and teams ==
2016 A10 Women's Soccer Individual Awards
Award	Recipient(s)
Player of the Year	
Coach of the Year	
Defensive Player of the Year	
Freshman of the Year	

2016 A10 Women's Soccer All-Conference Teams
First Team	Second Team	Rookie Team

== See also ==
- 2016 NCAA Division I women's soccer season
- 2016 Atlantic 10 Women's Soccer Tournament
- 2016 Atlantic 10 Conference men's soccer season
