= 2019 Atlantic 10 Conference women's soccer tournament =

- Classification: Division I
- Teams: 8
- Matches: 7
- Attendance: 4,436
- Site: Hermann Stadium; St. Louis, Missouri
- Champions: Saint Louis Billikens (4th title)
- Winning coach: Katie Shields (2nd title)
- MVP: Courtney Reimer (Saint Louis)
- Broadcast: ESPN+

2019 Atlantic 10 Conference women's soccer standings
	Conf.						Overall
Team	W		L		T	PCT	W		L		T	PCT
Saint Louis ‍†‍‡‍^{y}	9	–	0	–	1	.950	17	–	4	–	2	.783
George Washington ‍‍‍	7	–	1	–	2	.800	14	–	3	–	4	.762
UMass ‍‍‍	6	–	3	–	1	.650	10	–	6	–	3	.605
La Salle ‍‍‍	6	–	4	–	0	.600	11	–	8	–	1	.575
Dayton ‍‍‍	5	–	3	–	2	.600	7	–	9	–	3	.447
Fordham ‍‍‍	4	–	4	–	2	.500	5	–	11	–	4	.350
Saint Joseph's ‍‍‍	4	–	5	–	1	.450	7	–	10	–	2	.421
Duquesne ‍‍‍	4	–	5	–	1	.450	6	–	8	–	3	.441
Richmond ‍‍‍	4	–	6	–	0	.400	7	–	9	–	2	.444
VCU ‍‍‍	3	–	5	–	2	.400	9	–	6	–	3	.583
Davidson ‍‍‍	3	–	5	–	2	.400	8	–	8	–	3	.500
St. Bonaventure ‍‍‍	3	–	6	–	1	.350	7	–	10	–	1	.417
Rhode Island ‍‍‍	1	–	6	–	3	.250	4	–	9	–	5	.361
George Mason ‍‍‍	1	–	7	–	2	.200	3	–	11	–	3	.265
† – Conference champion ‡ – 2019 Atlantic 10 Tournament champion y – Invited to the NCAA tournament As of December 9, 2019; Rankings from United Soccer Coaches Poll; Source:A10 Conference

The 2019 Atlantic 10 Conference women's soccer tournament was the postseason women's soccer tournament for the Atlantic 10 Conference held from November 2 through November 10, 2019. The quarterfinals of the tournament were held at campus sites, while the semifinals and final took place at Hermann Stadium in St. Louis, Missouri. The eight-team single-elimination tournament consisted of three rounds based on seeding from regular season conference play. The defending tournament champions were the Saint Louis Billikens, who successfully defended their championship and regular season crown. This was the Billikens' fourth overall tournament title, and coach Katie Shields' second title.

== Bracket ==
Quarterfinals; Nov. 2–3
1	Saint Louis	5
8	Duquesne	0
4	La Salle	1
5	Dayton	0
2	George Washington	3
7	Saint Joseph's	0
3	Massachusetts	4
6	Fordham	0

Semifinals; Friday, Nov. 8
1	Saint Louis	1
4	La Salle	0
2	George Washington	2
3	Massachusetts	1

Final; Sunday, Nov. 10
1	Saint Louis	3
2	George Washington	1

== Schedule ==
=== Quarterfinals ===
November 2, 2019	#1 Saint Louis	5–0	#8 Duquesne	St. Louis, MO
1:00 p.m. CT	Alyssa Seitzer 1'; Courtney Reimer 24', 69'; Annabelle Copeland 33'; Megan Nixon 78'	Report		Stadium: Hermann Stadium; Attendance: 812; Referee: George Major; Assistant referees: Don Tebeau; Boban Simovic; Fourth official: Velimir Milovic

November 2, 2019	#4 La Salle	1–0	#5 Dayton	Philadelphia, PA
1:00 p.m. EST	Emily Banashefski 20'	Report		Stadium: McCarthy Stadium; Attendance: 342

November 2, 2019	#2 George Washington	3–0	#7 Saint Joseph's	Washington, D.C.
1:00 p.m. EST	Maria Pareja 5'; Sofia Pavon 51'; Rachel Sorkenn 73'; Isabelle Eskay (yellow card) 84'	Report		Stadium: Mount Vernon Athletic Fields; Attendance: 322; Referee: Jeffrey Gontarek; Assistant referees: Michael Donovan; Ian Gut

November 3, 2019	#3 Massachusetts	4–0	#6 Fordham	Amherst, MA
1:00 p.m. EST	Lauren Bonavita 50'; Ava Jouvenel 53'; Sini Laaksonen 56'; Rebeca Frisk 83'; Fatou Barry (yellow card) 84'	Report		Stadium: Rudd Field; Attendance: 408; Referee: Adam Kilpatrick; Assistant referees: Matt Mercier; Victory Matheson; Fourth official: Brian Graves-Harris

=== Semifinals ===
November 8, 2019	#1 Saint Louis	1–0	#4 La Salle	St. Louis, MO
1:00 p.m. CT	Courtney Reimer 26'	Report		Stadium: Hermann Stadium; Referee: William DeLois; Assistant referees: Don Tebeau; Saul Gonzalez; Fourth official: Stephen Valle

November 8, 2019	#2 George Washington	2–1	#3 Massachusetts	St. Louis, MO
4:00 p.m.	Sofia Pavon 46'; Rachel Sorkenn 75'	Report	81', (yellow card) 87' Lauren Bonavita	Stadium: Hermann Stadium; Attendance: 1,100; Referee: Eric Weisbrod; Assistant referees: George Major; Don Huber; Fourth official: Matthew Stein

=== Final ===
November 10, 2019	#1 Saint Louis	2–1	#2 George Washington	St. Louis, MO
12:00 p.m. CT	Hannah Friedrich 5' (pen.); Alli Klug 7' (pen.); Emily Groark 17'	Report	(yellow card) 79' Team; 83' Rachel Sorkenn	Stadium: Hermann Stadium; Attendance: 1,452; Referee: Nick Balcer; Assistant referees: Jeff Patrylo; Stephen Valle; Fourth official: Dule Djurasevic

== Statistics ==
=== Goalscorers ===
3 Goals

- Courtney Reimer (St. Louis)
- Rachel Sorkenn (George Washington)

2 Goals

- Lauren Bonavita (Massachusetts)
- Sofia Pavon (George Washington)

1 Goal

- Emily Banashefski (La Salle)
- Annabelle Copeland (St. Louis)
- Hannah Friedrich (St. Louis)
- Rebeca Frisk (Massachusetts)
- Emily Gorark (St. Louis)
- Ava Jouvenel (Massachusetts)
- Alli Klug (St. Louis)
- Sini Laaksonen (Massachusetts)
- Megan Nixon (St. Louis)
- Maria Pareja (George Washington)
- Alyssa Seitzer (St. Louis)

== All Tournament Team ==
Player	Team
**Courtney Reimer**	St. Louis
Hannah Friedrich	St. Louis
Alli Klug	St. Louis
Emma Farley	St. Louis
Mary Niehaus	St. Louis
Claudia Jenkins	La Salle
Jenny Hipp	Massachusetts
Lauren Bonavita	Massachusetts
Megan McCormick	George Washington
Sofia Pavon	George Washington
Rachel Sorkenn	George Washington

MVP in bold

== See also ==
- 2019 Atlantic 10 Men's Soccer Tournament
