= 2017 Atlantic 10 Conference women's soccer tournament =

- Classification: Division I
- Teams: 8
- Matches: 7
- Site: Sports Backers Stadium; Richmond, Virginia
- Champions: La Salle (3rd title)
- Winning coach: Paul Royal (3rd title)

2017 Atlantic 10 Conference women's soccer standings
	Conf.						Overall
Team	W		L		T	PCT	W		L		T	PCT
La Salle ‍†‍‡‍^{y}	9	–	0	–	1	.950	17	–	4	–	2	.783
Saint Louis ‍‍‍	7	–	2	–	1	.750	15	–	3	–	2	.800
George Mason ‍‍‍	6	–	2	–	2	.700	9	–	9	–	2	.500
Duquesne ‍‍‍	6	–	3	–	1	.650	11	–	6	–	3	.625
George Washington ‍‍‍	5	–	2	–	3	.650	10	–	5	–	4	.632
VCU ‍‍‍	5	–	3	–	2	.600	11	–	6	–	3	.625
Saint Joseph's ‍‍‍	5	–	3	–	2	.600	11	–	6	–	3	.625
Dayton ‍‍‍	4	–	4	–	2	.500	9	–	9	–	2	.500
UMass ‍‍‍	4	–	5	–	1	.450	7	–	9	–	2	.444
Fordham ‍‍‍	3	–	5	–	2	.400	6	–	8	–	5	.447
Richmond ‍‍‍	2	–	6	–	2	.300	2	–	13	–	2	.176
St. Bonaventure ‍‍‍	2	–	6	–	2	.300	2	–	14	–	3	.184
Davidson ‍‍‍	0	–	7	–	3	.150	2	–	14	–	3	.184
Rhode Island ‍‍‍	0	–	10	–	0	.000	3	–	15	–	0	.167
† – Conference champion ‡ – 2017 Atlantic 10 Tournament champion y – Invited to the NCAA tournament As of November 11, 2017; Rankings from United Soccer Coaches Poll; Source:A10 Conference

The 2017 Atlantic 10 Conference women's soccer tournament was the postseason women's soccer tournament for the Atlantic 10 Conference held from October 28 through November 5, 2017. The quarterfinals of the tournament were held at campus sites, while the semifinals and final took place at Sports Backers Stadium in Richmond, Virginia. The eight-team single-elimination tournament consisted of three rounds based on seeding from regular season conference play. The defending tournament champions were the Dayton Flyers, but they were eliminated from the 2017 tournament with a 3–2 quarterfinal loss to the La Salle Explorers. La Salle won the tournament, their third Atlantic 10 tournament championship in program history, all of which have come under the direction of head coach Paul Royal, and all three of which were decided in overtime periods.

Megan Dell, who finished the regular season for VCU with two goals, had all three of VCU's goals in the tournament, helping the host team advance to its second A10 final.

Maci Bower's decisive goal in the final, assisted by her sister Madison Bower, was in the ESPN SCTop10 plays of the day nationwide. It was Maci Bower's seventh game winner out of ten goals for the season.

== Bracket ==
Quarterfinals; October 28–29
1	La Salle	3
8	Dayton	2
4	Duquesne	1^{2OT}
5	George Washington	0
2	Saint Louis	0
7	Saint Joseph's	1
3	George Mason	1
6	VCU	2

Semifinals; Friday, Nov. 3
1	La Salle	2^{OT}
4	Duquesne	1
7	Saint Joseph's	0
6	VCU	1

Final; Sunday, Nov. 5
1	La Salle	1^{2OT}
6	VCU	0

== Schedule ==
=== Quarterfinals ===
October 28, 2017	#1 La Salle	3–2	#8 Dayton	Philadelphia, Pennsylvania
1:00 p.m. EDT	Maci Bower 3'; Kristin Haugstad 33'; Jess Shanahan 83'	Report	56' Alexis Kiehl; 85' Kaitlynn Kiehl	Stadium: McCarthy Stadium; Attendance: 586

October 28, 2017	#4 Duquesne	1–0 (a.e.t.)	#5 George Washington	Pittsburgh, Pennsylvania
1:00 p.m. EDT	Olivia Di Cristofaro 105' (o.g.)	Report		Stadium: Rooney Field; Attendance: 115; Referee: John Farner; Assistant referees: Paul Deverse; Sanjin Vidakovic; Fourth official: Salem Bensasi

October 28, 2017	#2 Saint Louis	0–1	#7 Saint Joseph's	St. Louis, Missouri
7:00 p.m. CDT		Report	30' Olivia Petit	Stadium: Hermann Stadium; Attendance: 846; Referee: Justin Tomicich; Assistant referees: Colin Pressy; Don Tebeau; Fourth official: Mark Boyko

October 29, 2017	#3 George Mason	1–2	#6 VCU	Fairfax, Virginia
1:00 p.m. EDT	Shannon Lee 20'	Report	49', 89' Megan Dell	Stadium: George Mason Stadium; Attendance: 247; Referee: Michael Donovan; Assistant referees: William Aten; Brendan Orino; Fourth official: Dan Marlowe

=== Semifinals ===
November 3, 2017	#1 La Salle	2–1 (a.e.t.)	#4 Duquesne	Richmond, Virginia
2:00 p.m. EDT	Katherine Hennessey 89'; Madison Bower 97'	Report	71' Katie O'Connor	Stadium: Sports Backers Stadium; Referee: Katie Mitchell; Assistant referees: Nick Furnish; JC Griggs; Fourth official: Roberto Furnish

November 3, 2017	#7 Saint Joseph's	0–1	#6 VCU	Richmond, Virginia
4:30 p.m. EDT		Report	71' (pen.) Megan Dell	Stadium: Sports Backers Stadium; Attendance: 838; Referee: Ben Wooten; Assistant referees: Jim Conley; Andrew Hutton; Fourth official: JC Griggs

=== Final ===
November 5, 2017	#1 La Salle	1–0 (a.e.t.)	#6 VCU	Richmond, Virginia
12:00 p.m. EST	Maci Bower 108'	Report		Stadium: Sports Backers Stadium; Attendance: 336; Referee: Karl Kummer; Assistant referees: Ben Wooten; Katie Mitchell; Fourth official: JC Griggs

== Statistics ==
=== Goalscorers ===
3 Goals

- Megan Dell - VCU

2 Goals

- Maci Bower - La Salle

1 Goal

- Madison Bower - La Salle
- Olivia Di Cristofaro - Duquesne
- Kristin Haugstad - La Salle
- Katherine Hennessey - La Salle
- Alexis Kiehl - Dayton
- Kaitlynn Kiehl - Dayton
- Shannon Lee - George Mason
- Katie O'Connor - Duquesne
- Olivia Petit - Saint Joseph's
- Jess Shanahan - La Salle

== See also ==
- 2017 Atlantic 10 Men's Soccer Tournament
