= 2018 Atlantic 10 Conference women's soccer tournament =

- Classification: Division I
- Teams: 8
- Matches: 7
- Site: Baujan Field; Dayton, Ohio
- Champions: Saint Louis Billikens (3rd title)
- Winning coach: Katie Shields (1st title)
- Broadcast: ESPN+

2018 Atlantic 10 Conference women's soccer standings
	Conf.						Overall
Team	W		L		T	PCT	W		L		T	PCT
Saint Louis ‍†‍‡‍^{y}	10	–	0	–	0	1.000	18	–	3	–	1	.841
VCU ‍‍‍	9	–	1	–	0	.900	16	–	4	–	0	.800
Saint Joseph's ‍‍‍	8	–	2	–	0	.800	14	–	5	–	2	.714
George Mason ‍‍‍	8	–	2	–	0	.800	14	–	6	–	0	.700
UMass ‍‍‍	6	–	3	–	1	.650	11	–	6	–	1	.639
Fordham ‍‍‍	6	–	3	–	1	.650	9	–	9	–	1	.500
George Washington ‍‍‍	6	–	4	–	0	.600	10	–	8	–	1	.553
Dayton ‍‍‍	4	–	5	–	1	.450	8	–	9	–	2	.474
LaSalle ‍‍‍	3	–	7	–	0	.300	8	–	8	–	1	.500
Duquesne ‍‍‍	2	–	6	–	2	.300	6	–	9	–	2	.412
Richmond ‍‍‍	2	–	7	–	1	.250	2	–	15	–	1	.139
St. Bonaventure ‍‍‍	2	–	8	–	0	.200	2	–	13	–	4	.211
Davidson ‍‍‍	0	–	9	–	1	.050	2	–	14	–	1	.147
Rhode Island ‍‍‍	0	–	9	–	1	.050	0	–	17	–	1	.028
† – Conference champion ‡ – 2018 Atlantic 10 Tournament champion y – Invited to the NCAA tournament As of October 25, 2018; Rankings from United Soccer Coaches Poll; Source:A10 Conference

The 2018 Atlantic 10 Conference women's soccer tournament was the postseason women's soccer tournament for the Atlantic 10 Conference held from October 27 through November 4, 2018. The quarterfinals of the tournament were held at campus sites, while the semifinals and final took place at Baujan Field in Dayton, Ohio. The eight-team single-elimination tournament consisted of three rounds based on seeding from regular season conference play. The defending tournament champions were the La Salle Explorers. La Salle did not qualify for the tournament after finishing ninth in conference regular season play. The top seed, and regular season champions were the Saint Louis Billikens. Saint Louis also won their second overall title, and coach Katie Shields' first title.

== Bracket ==
Quarterfinals; Oct. 27–28
1	Saint Louis	3
8	Dayton	0
4	George Mason	2^{2OT}
5	UMass	1
2	VCU	3
7	George Washington	2
3	Saint Joseph's	2
6	Fordham	0

Semifinals; Friday, Nov. 2
1	Saint Louis	3
4	George Mason	1
2	VCU	2
3	Saint Joseph's	1

Final; Sunday, Nov. 4
1	Saint Louis	5
2	VCU	1

== Schedule ==
=== Quarterfinals ===
October 27, 2018	#4 George Mason	2–1 (a.e.t.)	#5 UMass	Fairfax, VA
7:00 p.m. EDT	Emily Bradshaw 38'; Emma Van Der Vorst (yellow card) 48', 104'	Report	Jenny Hipp (yellow card) 58', (goal) 61'	Stadium: George Mason Stadium; Referee: Nicholas Gauck; Assistant referees: Nickrod Fateh; Anthony Tribotti; Fourth official: John Loy

October 27, 2018	#2 VCU	3–2	#7 George Washington	Richmond, VA
7:00 p.m. EDT	Kelly Graves 4', 52'; GW Own Goal 82'	Report	Sofia Pavon 27', 90'	Stadium: Sports Backers Stadium; Attendance: 393; Referee: Bill Dittmar; Assistant referees: JC Griggs; Matthew Masciangelo; Fourth official: Mike Renner

October 27, 2018	#3 Saint Joseph's	2–0	#6 Fordham	St. Louis, Missouri
7:00 p.m. EDT	Ryan Taylor 14'; Morgan Bower 48'	Report		Stadium: Hermann Stadium; Attendance: 110; Referee: David Breckner; Assistant referees: Randy Vonsteuben; Jerry Werel

October 28, 2018	#1 Saint Louis	3–0	#8 Dayton	St. Louis, Missouri
2:00 p.m. EDT	Courtney Reimer 14'; Emma Farley 26'; Olivia Petit (yellow card) 28'; Annabelle Copeland 83'	Report		Stadium: Hermann Stadium; Attendance: 837; Referee: Kevin Fikar; Assistant referees: Don Tebeau; Velimir Milovic; Fourth official: Stephen Valle

=== Semifinals ===
November 2, 2018	#1 Saint Louis	3–1	#4 George Mason	Dayton, OH
1:00 p.m. EDT	Hannah Friedrich 13'; Olivia Petit 32'; Maddie Pokorny 78'	Report	Jisca Adigo 54'	Stadium: Baujan Field; Referee: Lucas Feathers; Assistant referees: Maggie Short; Rizal Milliken; Fourth official: Mikael Lundqvist

November 2, 2018	#2 VCU	2–1	#3 Saint Joseph's	Dayton, OH
3:30 p.m. EDT	Samantha Jerabek 2'; Ingrid Brouwer 75'	Report	Morgan Bower 55'; Grace Bendon (yellow card) 73'; Taylor Ryan (yellow card) 84'	Stadium: Baujan Field; Referee: Heber Estrada; Assistant referees: Britton Maier; Brian Di Piro; Fourth official: Alec Bertok

=== Final ===
November 4, 2018	#1 Saint Louis	5–1	#2 VCU	Dayton, OH
12:00 p.m. EDT	Lindsay Sands 3'; VCU Own Goal 18'; Maddie Pokorny 73', 77', 88'	Report	Ingrid Brouwer 73'	Stadium: Baujan Field; Referee: Karl Kummer; Assistant referees: Kevin Fikar; Michael Kinder

== Statistics ==
=== Goalscorers ===
4 Goals

- Maddie Pokorny - Saint Louis

2 Goals

- Ingrid Brouwer - VCU
- Morgan Bower - Saint Joseph's
- Kelly Graves - VCU
- Sofia Pavon - George Washington

1 Goal

- Jisca Adigo - George Mason
- Emily Bradshaw - George Mason
- Annabelle Copeland - Saint Louis
- Emma Farley - Saint Louis
- Hannah Friedrich - Saint Louis
- Jenny Hipp - UMass
- Samantha Jerabek - VCU
- Olivia Petit - Saint Louis
- Courtney Reimer - Saint Louis
- Lindsay Sands - Saint Louis
- Ryan Taylor - Saint Joseph's
- Emma Van Der Vorst - George Mason

Own Goals

- George Washington vs. VCU
- VCU vs. Saint Louis

== See also ==
- 2018 Atlantic 10 Men's Soccer Tournament
