= 2016 Atlantic 10 Conference women's soccer tournament =

- Classification: Division I
- Teams: 8
- Matches: 7
- Site: URI Soccer Complex; Kingston, Rhode Island
- Champions: Dayton (10th title)
- Winning coach: Mike Tucker (10th title)

2016 Atlantic 10 Conference women's soccer standings
	Conf.						Overall
Team	W		L		T	PCT	W		L		T	PCT
Saint Joseph's ‍†‍‍	9	–	0	–	1	.950	18	–	2	–	2	.864
Saint Louis ‍‍‍	7	–	1	–	2	.800	14	–	4	–	2	.750
Duquesne ‍‍‍	7	–	2	–	1	.750	11	–	6	–	3	.625
Fordham ‍‍‍	5	–	1	–	4	.700	10	–	5	–	5	.625
George Mason ‍‍‍	6	–	3	–	1	.650	13	–	7	–	1	.643
George Washington ‍‍‍	4	–	3	–	3	.550	11	–	7	–	3	.595
Dayton ‍‍‡‍^{y}	4	–	4	–	2	.500	9	–	10	–	3	.477
Rhode Island ‍‍‍	3	–	4	–	3	.450	6	–	8	–	5	.447
Richmond ‍‍‍	4	–	6	–	0	.400	9	–	9	–	1	.500
VCU ‍‍‍	4	–	6	–	0	.400	8	–	10	–	1	.447
LaSalle ‍‍‍	2	–	4	–	4	.400	4	–	10	–	4	.333
UMass ‍‍‍	1	–	7	–	2	.200	3	–	11	–	3	.265
Davidson ‍‍‍	1	–	8	–	1	.150	5	–	13	–	1	.289
St. Bonaventure ‍‍‍	1	–	9	–	0	.100	4	–	14	–	1	.237
† – Conference champion ‡ – 2016 Atlantic 10 Tournament champion y – Invited to the NCAA tournament As of 2016-11-17; Rankings from NSCAA

The 2016 Atlantic 10 Conference women's soccer tournament was the postseason women's soccer tournament for the Atlantic 10 Conference held from November 3 to 6, 2016. The seven-match tournament was held at the URI Soccer Complex in Kingston, Rhode Island. The eight team single-elimination tournament consisted of three rounds based on seeding from regular season conference play. The Duquesne Dukes were the defending tournament champions, defeating the Fordham Rams in the 2015 championship match. Dayton, 7-0 winners over Saint Joseph's, took the crown in 2016. It was the second straight year that a 7-seed won the A10 Conference tournament. The final match was televised on American Sports Network (ASN).

== Bracket ==
Quarterfinals; Thursday, Nov. 3
1	St. Joseph's	1^{2OT}
8	Rhode Island	0
4	George Mason	2^{OT}
5	Fordham	1
2	Saint Louis	0
7	Dayton	3
3	Duquesne	1
6	George Washington	2^{2OT}

Semifinals; Friday, Nov. 4
1	St. Joseph's	5
4	George Mason	2
7	Dayton	2
6	George Washington	0

Final; Sunday, Nov. 6
1	St. Joseph's	0
7	Dayton	7

== Schedule ==
=== Quarterfinals ===
November 3, 2016	#2 Saint Louis	0–3	#7 Dayton	Kingston, Rhode Island
11:00 a.m. EST		Report	Alexis Kiehl 29'; Libby Leedom 57'; Beth Kamphaus 83'	Stadium: URI Soccer Complex; Referee: Kara Honthumb

November 3, 2016	#3 Duquesne	1–2 (a.e.t.)	#6 George Washington	Kingston, Rhode Island
2:00 p.m. EST	Cydney Staton 85'	Report	MacKenzie Cowley 72'; Brittany Cooper 110'	Stadium: URI Soccer Complex; Referee: Jeff Davis

November 3, 2016	#1 St. Joseph's	1–0 (a.e.t.)	#8 Rhode Island	Kingston, Rhode Island
5:00 p.m. EST	Sofia Cabral 102' (o.g.)	Report		Stadium: URI Soccer Complex; Referee: Jessica Remmes

November 3, 2016	#4 George Mason	2–1 (a.e.t.)	#5 Fordham	Kingston, Rhode Island
8:00 p.m. EST	Jenna Hamilton 15'; Erin Mitchell 97'	Report	Brooke Salmon 89'	Stadium: URI Soccer Complex; Referee: Danny Marques

=== Semifinals ===
November 4, 2016	#7 Dayton	2–0	#6 George Washington	Kingston, Rhode Island
5:00 p.m. EST	Alexis Kiehl 46', 59'	Report		Stadium: URI Soccer Complex; Referee: Michael D'Angelo

November 4, 2016	#1 St. Joseph's	5–2	#4 George Mason	Kingston, Rhode Island
7:30 p.m. EST	Shannon Mulvey 16'; Gabrielle Vagnozzi 23'; Dakota Mills 52', 88'; Lauren Dimes 77'	Report	Abby Downey 74'; Meghan Dipippa 76' (o.g.)	Stadium: URI Soccer Complex; Referee: Boris Senic

=== Final ===
November 6, 2016	#1 St. Joseph's	0–7	#7 Dayton	Kingston, Rhode Island
12:00 p.m. EST		Report	Libby Leedom 38', 54', 70'; Micayla Livingston 39'; Alexis Kiehl 57', 69'; Beth Kamphaus 84'	Stadium: URI Soccer Complex; Referee: Danielle Chesky
