= Saint Louis Billikens soccer =

Saint Louis Billikens soccer may refer to either of the soccer teams that represent the Saint Louis University (United States):

- Saint Louis Billikens men's soccer
- Saint Louis Billikens women's soccer
