= VCU Rams soccer =

VCU Rams soccer may refer to either of the soccer teams that represent the Virginia Commonwealth University:

- VCU Rams men's soccer
- VCU Rams women's soccer
