= Davidson Wildcats women's lacrosse =

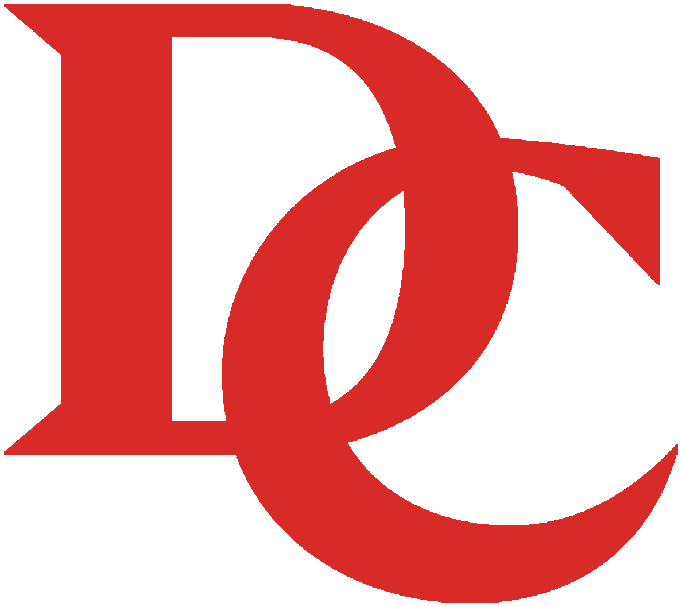
- Founded: 1994; 32 years ago
- University: Davidson College
- Head coach: Kim Wayne (18th season)
- Stadium: Davidson College Stadium
- Location: Davidson, North Carolina
- Conference: Atlantic 10 Conference
- Nickname: Wildcats
- Colors: Red and black

NCAA Tournament appearances
- 2026

Conference Tournament championships
- 2026

Conference regular season championships
- 2013

The Davidson Wildcats women's lacrosse is an NCAA Division I college lacrosse team representing Davidson College as part of the Atlantic 10 Conference. They play their home games at Davidson College Stadium in Davidson, North Carolina. The Wildcats are led by head coach Kim Wayne.

== History ==
The Davidson women's lacrosse program began in 1994 as an independent, finishing with a 3-7 record in its inaugural 1994 season.

As a member of the Big South Conference, the Wildcats won the 2013 Big South regular season title with an overall 11-7 record. In 2013, Davidson was unbeaten in conference play in the regular season but lost in the conference tournament finals to No. 2 High Point 9-7.

In 2026, the 4-seed Wildcats won their first-ever conference championship in the Atlantic 10 Conference, defeating VCU. It was also the program's first-ever NCAA tournament appearance and the season's 15-4 record was the program's best-ever mark.
