= Katie Cappelletti =

American soccer player (born 2002)

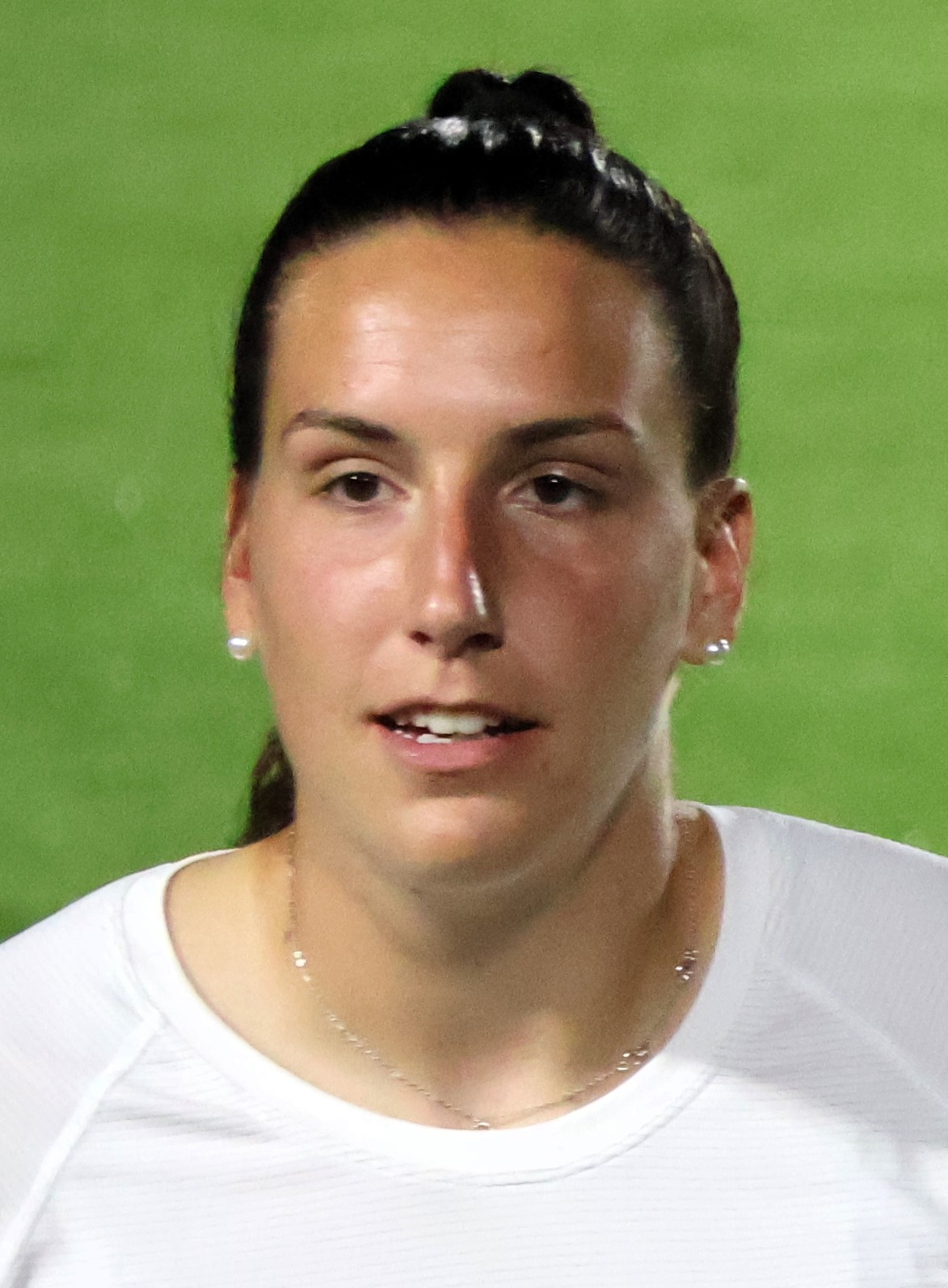
- Cappelletti in 2025

Personal information
- Full name: Katherine Lawler Cappelletti
- Date of birth: September 12, 2002 (age 24)
- Place of birth: Fayetteville, New York
- Height: 6 ft 0 in (1.83 m)
- Position: Goalkeeper

Team information
- Current team: DC Power FC
- Number: 1

Youth career
- Syracuse Development Academy

College career
Years	Team	Apps	(Gls)
2021–2024	Saint Joseph's Hawks	85	(0)

Senior career*
Years	Team	Apps	(Gls)
2022	Rochester Lady Lancers	–	(–)
2025	North Carolina Courage	0	(0)
2026	Kansas City Current	0	(0)
2026–	DC Power FC	2	(0)
- * Club domestic league appearances and goals as of 16:30, August 22, 2026 (UTC)

Katherine Lawler Cappelletti (born September 12, 2002) is an American professional soccer player who plays as a goalkeeper for USL Super League club DC Power FC. She played college soccer for the Saint Joseph's Hawks, setting the program record for clean sheets.

== Early life ==
Cappelletti was born and raised in Fayetteville, New York, and attended Jamesville-DeWitt High School. She began playing in goal when she was six. She played club soccer for Syracuse Development Academy.

== College career ==
Cappeletti won the starting job for the Saint Joseph's Hawks during her freshman season in the spring of 2021, the season having been postponed due to the coronavirus pandemic. She posted 7 clean sheets in 20 starts as both a sophomore in 2021 and junior in 2022, helping the Hawks to appearances in the Atlantic 10 Conference tournament semifinals both seasons. During her senior year in 2023, she became Saint Joseph's career leader in clean sheets, passing the record previously shared by Grace Bendon and Colleen Corcoran. She returned for her fifth and final season as a graduate student in 2024, helping the Hawks to their third A-10 tournament semifinal in four years. She led the A-10 in saves, posted 8 clean sheets (7 solo) in 20 games, and was named first-team All-A-10 and the A-10 Goalkeeper of the Year. During college, she also played for the Rochester Lady Lancers and was named the United Women's Soccer East Conference Goalkeeper of the Year in 2022.

== Club career ==
Cappelletti joined the North Carolina Courage as a non-roster invitee in the 2025 preseason. In May, after the retirement of third-string keeper Hensley Hancuff, she signed her first professional contract with the Courage for the remainder of the season. She was unused as the third-stringer behind starter Casey Murphy and backup Marisa Jordan.

Cappelletti joined the Kansas City Current as a non-roster invitee in the 2026 preseason, before signing a short-term contract through May, and was third-string behind starter Lorena and backup Marisa Jordan, who also joined from the Courage.

On July 7, 2026, Cappelletti signed with USL Super League club DC Power FC. She made her professional debut on August 15, 2026, earning the start in DC Power's season-opening loss to the Carolina Ascent.

== Honors and awards ==
Individual

- Atlantic 10 Conference Goalkeeper of the Year: 2024
- First-team All-Atlantic 10: 2024
