= Caroline Kelly =

American soccer player (born 2002)

Personal information
- Full name: Caroline Jayne Kelly
- Date of birth: February 22, 2002 (age 24)
- Height: 5 ft 9 in (1.75 m)
- Position: Forward

Team information
- Current team: Kansas City Current II

Youth career
- KC Athletics ECNL

College career
Years	Team	Apps	(Gls)
2020–2023	Saint Louis Billikens	76	(31)
2024	TCU Horned Frogs	22	(13)

Senior career*
Years	Team	Apps	(Gls)
2025	Brooklyn FC	5	(2)
2025–2026	Dallas Trinity	14	(0)
2026–	Kansas City Current II		
- * Club domestic league appearances and goals as of 05:16, May 26, 2026 (UTC)

Caroline Jayne Kelly (born February 22, 2002) is an American professional soccer player who plays as a forward for the Kansas City Current II. She played college soccer for the Saint Louis Billikens and the TCU Horned Frogs. She has previously played for USL Super League clubs Brooklyn FC and Dallas Trinity FC.

== Early life ==
Kelly grew up nearby Kansas City in the town of Kearney, Missouri. She attended Kearney High School, where she played both soccer and basketball. With the soccer team, Kelly was an All-State honorable mention as a freshman before winning two All-State first team awards in her latter years. She also played for KC Athletics in the Elite Clubs National League, where she helped the team reach a U18 State Championship match and the ECNL quarterfinals in her youth.

== College career ==
=== Saint Louis Billikens ===
As a high school sophomore, Kelly committed to Saint Louis University. She kicked off her collegiate career with the Billikens in 2020, although the COVID-19 pandemic and a knee injury delayed her college debut by a year. She recovered in time to play in the final 7 games of her freshman season and scored her first college goal against Duquesne on April 4, 2021. The following season, Kelly rose to a starting role and played in all 23 of the Billikens' games. She was named to the A-10 Championship All-Tournament team and scored 5 goals on the season. Kelly also tallied 2 assists, one of which occurred in SLU's conference quarterfinal victory over Rhode Island.

Kelly built on her success in her junior year, being named the College Soccer News National Player of the Week in September 2022, landing a spot on two TopDrawerSoccer National Teams of the Week, and being named on the All-Conference first team at the end of the season. Kelly had a breakout season in her final year at Saint Louis, once again winning multiple accolades. She was named to the All-Region second team, the All-Conference first team, and won the A-10 Championship Most Outstanding Player award. She also was included on the Mac Hermann Trophy watchlist and helped SLU achieve its longest NCAA tournament run in history. Kelly completed her tenure with Saint Louis as the third-highest program goalscorer, with 31 scored in her 76 appearances.

=== TCU Horned Frogs ===
Kelly transferred to Texas Christian University in 2024 and exercised her final year of college eligibility to play one season with the TCU Horned Frogs. In her lone campaign at TCU, Kelly was responsible for 13 goals, which tied for first within her team and the Big 12 Conference as a whole. One of her goals was the game-winner in TCU's NCAA tournament first round victory, and two others occurred in the knockout stages of the Big 12 tournament. Kelly was recognized on the All-Big 12 and Big 12 All-Tournament Teams at the end of the year.

== Club career ==
=== Brooklyn FC ===
Directly out of college, Kelly spent time as a preseason trialist with San Diego Wave FC of the National Women's Soccer League. However, she did not sign a contract with the Californian club. Instead, she inked a deal with USL Super League club Brooklyn FC on April 1, 2025, lasting through the remainder of the team's inaugural season. Kelly made her professional debut on April 19, coming in as a second-half substitute in a 1–1 draw with Lexington SC. Two games later, she scored her first professional goal in a 4–1 victory over Fort Lauderdale United FC. She scored once more as Brooklyn failed to qualify for the playoffs at the end of the season.

=== Dallas Trinity ===
On July 14, 2025, Kelly signed with fellow USL Super League team Dallas Trinity FC. She made her Dallas debut on August 23, coming on as a substitute in the Trinity's season-opening win over Spokane Zephyr FC. She went on to total 14 league appearances in her lone season with Dallas, helping the Trinity qualify for the playoffs for the second consecutive season. On June 4, 2026, Dallas announced Kelly's departure from the club.

=== Kansas City Current II ===
Kelly then joined the Kansas City Current II reserve team that won the Women's Premier Soccer League (WPSL) championship. She scored in three straight playoff matches and even started one regular-season match in goal.

== Career statistics ==
=== Club ===
As of May 23, 2026

Appearances and goals by club, season and competition
Club	Season	League			Cup		Playoffs (Note: Includes USL Super League playoffs)		Total	
Club	Season	Division	Apps	Goals	Apps	Goals	Apps	Goals	Apps	Goals
Brooklyn FC	2024-25	USL Super League	5	2	—		—		5	2
Dallas Trinity FC	2025–26	USL Super League	14	0	—		—		14	0
Career total			19	2	0	0	0	0	19	2

== Honors and awards ==
Saint Louis Billikens

- Atlantic 10 Conference: 2020, 2022, 2023
- Atlantic 10 Conference tournament: 2020, 2021, 2022, 2023

TCU Horned Frogs

- Big 12 Conference: 2024

Kansas City Current II

- Women's Premier Soccer League: 2026

Individual

- First-team All-Big 12: 2024
- Atlantic 10 Conference Offensive Player of the Year: 2022
- First-team All-A-10: 2022, 2023
- A-10 tournament MVP: 2023
- A-10 tournament all-tournament team: 2021, 2022, 2023
- Big 12 tournament all-tournament team: 2024
