= McCarthy Stadium =

Stadium in Philadelphia, Pennsylvania

Coordinates: 40.037548°N 75.154228°W

- The Mac

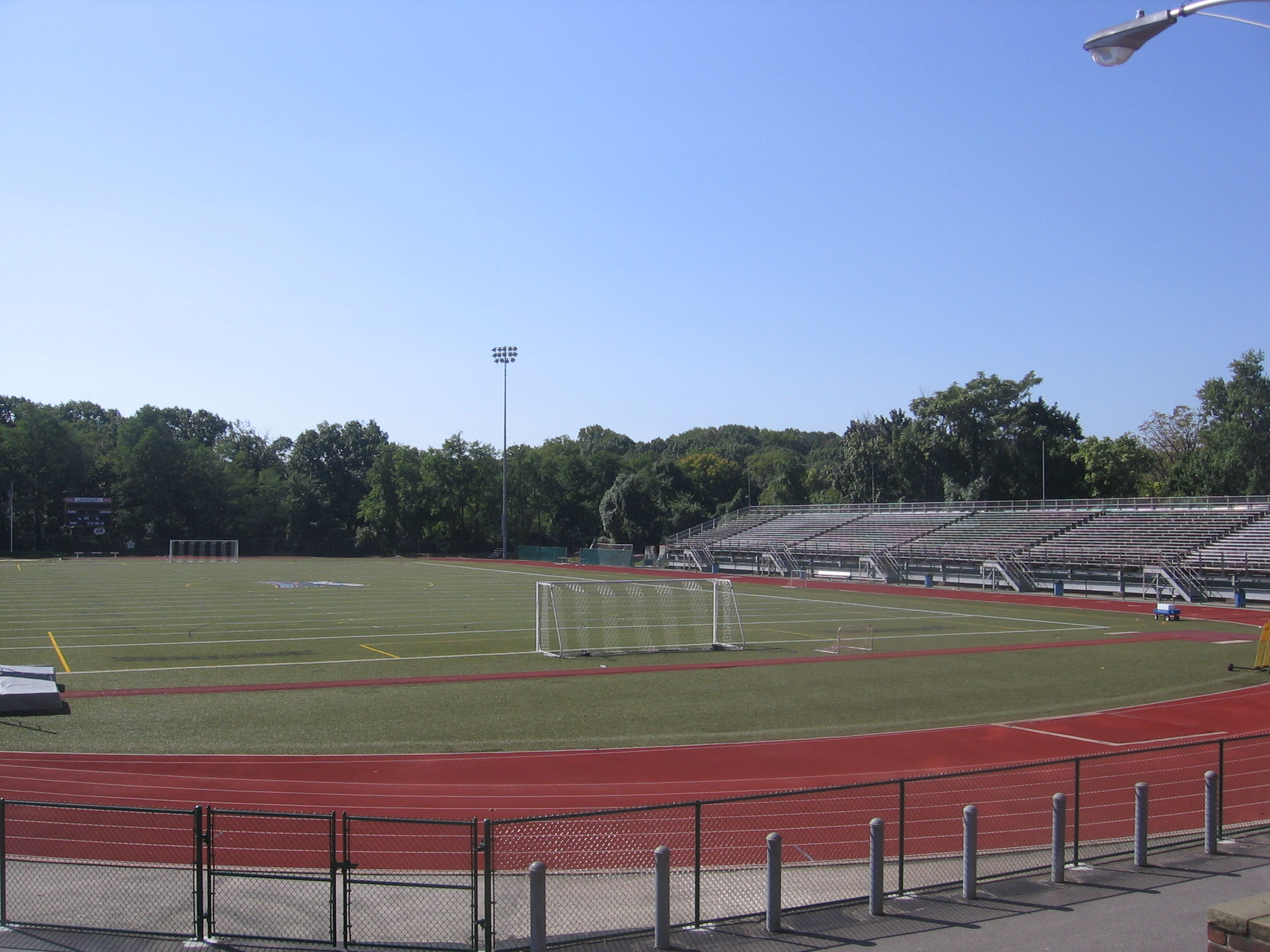
- View of the stadium in 2010
- Interactive map of McCarthy Stadium
- Address: 1900 W. Olney Ave. Philadelphia, PA; United States
- Owner: La Salle University
- Operator: La Salle Athletics
- Capacity: 7,500
- Type: Stadium
- Surface: Grass
- Current use: Soccer; Lacrosse
- Public transit: SEPTA bus: 18, 26, 41

Construction
- Groundbreaking: August 24, 1936
- Opened: 31 October 1936; 90 years ago
- Architect: Peter Getz (1936)
- General contractor: Denis O'Dea (1936)

Tenants
- La Salle Explorers soccer, lacrosse

Website
- goexplorers.com/mccarthy-stadium

McCarthy Stadium, nicknamed The Mac, is a 7,500-seat stadium in Philadelphia, Pennsylvania. It is home to the La Salle University Explorers men's and women's soccer, and lacrosse teams. It was previously the home to the university's American football team until it was discontinued in 2007 after a seven-year revival. The facility opened in 1936. Its field is surrounded by a six lane, one-quarter mile track.

== History ==
The original football field ran perpendicular to today's configuration, and the fifty yards of gridiron nearest the current scoreboard are essentially the result of a substantial landfill operation by Joseph M. Crowley during the mid-1930s. The above landfill involved several men and a horse to gradually level the countless truckloads of dirt, rocks, bricks, concrete, and asphalt (each load cost La Salle about twenty-five cents).

Ground was broken on the stadium on August 24, 1936 during a ceremony presided over by college president Brother F. Anselm. It was announced during the ceremony that it would be named for John A. McCarthy who had encouraged its construction. It was planned to seat 20,000.

The first collegiate football game held at the stadium occurred on 1 November 1936, in which La Salle defeated fellow Christian Brothers' college (St. Mary's of Minnesota), 47–12. The stadium was officially dedicated on 10 October 1937 with a parade consisting of a color guard, the college band, and the college ROTC unit. The stadium was just five years old when La Salle's last Varsity football game was played in November 1941. The sport was suspended indefinitely because World War II resulted in a dramatic decline in the enrollment of La Salle and virtually every Catholic men's college. La Salle's aggregate record during eleven years of gridiron competition (1931–1941) was 51-34-8, and several Explorers had been named to Little All-American status.

The stadium continued to host high school football games, especially those involving La Salle College High School on Sunday afternoons, and recent LSCHS-Saint Joseph's Preparatory School Thanksgiving showdowns. During the Second World War, thirty or so German prisoners-of-war (housed in the nearby Pennsylvania National Guard Armory) were also periodically brought to the stadium for exercise, usually soccer.

Starting in 1950, the building underneath the west stands was known as "McCarthy Hall", and was the location of ROTC classes for years. McCarthy Hall was damaged, and the press box was destroyed in a suspicious fire in March 1977. Underneath the east stands, a textbook store operated until the 1980s. La Salle's Mail and Printing services are currently located under the east stands.

Over the 1988-1989 school year, McCarthy Stadium's cinder track was rubberized, and the track was named the Frank M. Wetzler Track in honor of a former La Salle Professor and track coach.

In April 1997, a concert by the Indigo Girls in 1997 suffered an 11th-hour cancellation because of standing water from heavy rains earlier in the week. In August of that year, the U. S. Postal Service held its unveiling of the official Glenn Scobey "Pop" Warner postage stamp in ceremony at the stadium.

In 2006, the grass field was razed and replaced with a Sprinturf artificial playing surface. In addition, lights were added.

=== Namesake ===
The stadium's namesake is John A. McCarthy (1872–1939) who graduated from Central High School and the University of Pennsylvania. He began a law career, but at the age of thirty-four he exchanged it for a future in finance when he was appointed as a counsel in the receivership of the old Real Estate Trust Co. McCarthy went on to become President of the Philadelphia Sugar Co. and also an officer or director of a dozen large firms. McCarthy donated $10,000 towards the construction of the stadium, and later led a fund-raising effort for La Salle's 75th Anniversary.
