= Rudd Field (UMass) =

Soccer stadium in Massachusetts, USA

Coordinates: 42.3825°N 72.5359°W

- Interactive map of Rudd Field
- Location: Hadley, Massachusetts
- Owner: University of Massachusetts Amherst
- Operator: University of Massachusetts Amherst
- Capacity: 800
- Surface: Natural Grass

Construction
- Groundbreaking: May 6, 2002
- Opened: September 8, 2002
- Cost: $900,000
- Architects: Clough, Harbour & Associates

Tenants
- UMass Minutemen and Minutewomen (NCAA) (2002–present)

Rudd Field is a soccer stadium in Hadley, Massachusetts. It is the home of the UMass Minutemen and UMass Minutewomen soccer teams.

The facility opened September 8, 2002. The field includes a 120 by 75 yard sand-based natural turf playing surface. Funding for the field was made possible by a commitment from the Rudd Family Foundation.

On May 6, 2002, ground was broken for the construction of Rudd Field. The field is named in honor of Jinny and Andrew Rudd, the parents of former UMass soccer player Alexandra Rudd. The Rudd Family Foundation contributed half a million dollars to construct the field.
