= Baujan Field =

Soccer stadium in Dayton, Ohio

Coordinates: 39°44′17″N 84°10′40″W

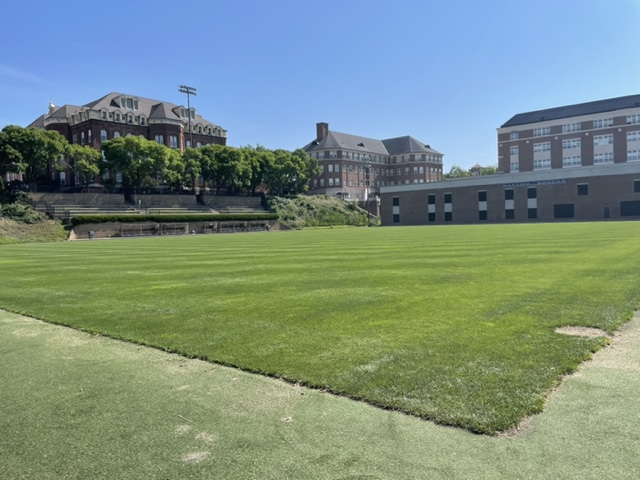
Baujan Field UD

Baujan Field is a soccer-specific stadium located in Dayton, Ohio on the University of Dayton campus. Its main tenants are the Dayton Flyers men's and women's soccer teams.

The field was originally built in 1925 as UD's main athletic field, and was named in honor of longtime head football coach Harry Baujan in 1961. After the football team moved to Welcome Stadium in 1974, the concrete grandstand was torn down, and it was retrofitted for soccer. Bleachers were the only seats available from then until 2000, when a terraced seating section was carved into the hillside.
