= UMass Minutewomen soccer =

American college soccer team

- Founded: 1978; 48 years ago
- University: University of Massachusetts Amherst
- Head coach: Jason Dowiak
- Conference: MAC
- Location: Amherst, Massachusetts
- Stadium: Rudd Field (capacity: 800)
- Nickname: Minutewomen
- Colors: Maroon and white
Home	Away

NCAA Tournament runner-up
- 1987

NCAA Tournament College Cup
- 1983, 1984, 1985, 1986, 1987, 1993

NCAA Tournament Quarterfinals
- 1982, 1983, 1984, 1985, 1986, 1987, 1988, 1989, 1992, 1993

NCAA Tournament Round of 16
- 1993, 1994, 1995, 1996

NCAA Tournament Round of 32
- 1996, 1997

NCAA Tournament appearances
- 1982, 1983, 1984, 1985, 1986, 1987, 1988, 1989, 1991, 1992, 1993, 1994, 1995, 1996, 1997

Conference Tournament championships
- 1993, 1994, 1995, 1997

Conference Regular Season championships
- 1993, 1994, 1996, 1997

The UMass Minutewomen soccer team is a varsity intercollegiate athletic team of University of Massachusetts Amherst in Amherst, Massachusetts, United States.

The team is a member of the Mid-American Conference, which is part of the National Collegiate Athletic Association's Division I. The team plays its home games at Rudd Field. The Minutewomen are coached by Jason Dowiak.

== History ==
The UMass women's soccer team began competition as a varsity team in 1978.

The Minutewomen appeared in the NCAA Final Four five consecutive times from 1983 to 1987. UMass appeared in the NCAA national final in 1987, falling to North Carolina 1-0 in the national championship game at McGuirk Alumni Stadium. To date, the 1987 campaign remains the best-ever finish for the women's soccer program.

UMass has appeared six times in the NCAA Final Four, most recently in 1993. The Minutewomen have also appeared in the NCAA tournament 15 times, most recently in 1997. During its time in the Atlantic 10 Conference from 1993 to 2024, UMass won four conference championships with its final and most recent title coming in 1997.

== Players ==
=== Current roster ===
As of 5 Jun 2025

Note: Flags indicate national team as defined under FIFA eligibility rules; some limited exceptions apply. Players may hold more than one non-FIFA nationality.

No.	Pos.	Nation	Player
0	GK	USA	Bella Mendoza
4	DF	AUS	Hannah Peric
5	DF	USA	Sarah DeFreitas
6	DF	USA	Libby Fisher
7	FW	USA	Karina Groff
8	MF	USA	Emma Pedolzky
9	FW	USA	Chandler Pedolzky
10	FW	ENG	Amelia Bloom
11	FW	USA	Juliana Ryan
12	FW	USA	Morgan Bellamy
13	FW	USA	Grace Pinkus

No.	Pos.	Nation	Player
14	FW	USA	Sophia Foley
15	MF	CAN	ess Collantes
16	MF	USA	Ella Curry
18	FW	USA	Caroline Dickson
19	DF	USA	Sarah Flanagan
21	MF	USA	Annie McCaffrey
24	DF	SWE	Amanda Schultz
25	DF	USA	Macy Graves
26	GK	USA	Leah Nisenfeld
27	DF	USA	Carolina Benitez
28	GK	USA	Julia Rosenberg

=== Retired numbers ===
No.	Player	Pos.	Tenure	No. ret.	Ref.
1	Briana Scurry	GK	1990–93	2014	
2	April Kater	FW	1987–90	2014	

== Seasons ==
Statistics overview
Season	Coach	Overall	Conference	Standing	Postseason
UMass (Independent) (1978–1992)
1978	Arnie Morse	15-0-1			
1979	Arnie Morse	13-3-1			
1980	Ken Banda	15-3-1			
1981	Ken Banda	13-6-2			
1982	Ken Banda	15-4-0			NCAA Quarterfinal
1983	Ken Banda	12-3-3			NCAA Final Four
1984	Ken Banda	15-3-2			NCAA Final Four
1985	Ken Banda	16-1-0			NCAA Final Four
1986	Ken Banda	14-3-2			NCAA Final Four
1987	Ken Banda	20-2-0			NCAA Runner-Up
1988	Jim Rudy	14-3-1			NCAA Quarterfinal
1989	Jim Rudy	12-4-4			NCAA Quarterfinal
1990	Jim Rudy	10-5-2			
1991	Jim Rudy	14-5-0			NCAA First Round
1992	Jim Rudy	16-4-0			NCAA Quarterfinal
UMass (Atlantic 10 Conference) (1993–2024)
1993	Jim Rudy	17-3-3	4-0-2	1st	NCAA Final Four; A-10 Champions
1994	Jim Rudy	16-6-0	5-0-0	1st	NCAA Sweet 16; A-10 Champions
1995	Jim Rudy	14-4-2	3-1-0	2nd – East	NCAA Sweet 16; A-10 Champions
1996	Jim Rudy	16-5-1	7-0-1	1st – East	NCAA Sweet 16; A-10 Runner-Up
1997	Jim Rudy	17-5-0	11-0-0	1st	NCAA First Round; A-10 Champions
1998	Jim Rudy	10-11-0	7-4-0	4th	A-10 Semifinal
1999	Jim Rudy	11-5-1	9-2-0	T-2nd	A-10 Semifinal
2000	Jim Rudy	11-7-1	7-2-1	3rd	A-10 Semifinal
2001	Jim Rudy	10-6-0	7-4-0	5th	
2002	Jim Rudy	6-11-0	5-6-0	7th	
2003	Jim Rudy	4-12-1	3-8-0	T-10th	
2004	Jim Rudy	7-11-0	5-7-0	T-6th	A-10 Quarterfinal
2005	Jim Rudy	8-9-1	5-4-0	T-5th	
2006	Jim Rudy	11-6-0	5-4-0	7th	
2007	Jim Rudy	9-6-2	4-6-1	9th	
2008	Jim Rudy	6-9-3	3-7-1	11th	
2009	Angela Napoli	6-11-2	5-6-0	6th	A-10 Quarterfinal
2010	Ed Matz	8-11-0	5-4-0	T-5th	A-10 Quarterfinal
2011	Ed Matz	14-5-2	6-2-1	4th	A-10 Runner-Up
2012	Ed Matz	9-10-1	4-4-1	T-7th	A-10 Quarterfinal
2013	Ed Matz	7-9-4	3-3-2	8th	A-10 Semifinal
2014	Ed Matz	5-9-5	3-3-2	8th	A-10 Quarterfinal
2015	Ed Matz	6-8-4	3-5-2	9th	
2016	Ed Matz	3-11-3	1-7-2	12th	
2017	Ed Matz	7-9-2	4-5-1	9th	
2018	Jason Dowiak	11-6-1	6-3-1	5th	A-10 Quarterfinal
2019	Jason Dowiak	10-6-3	6-3-1	3rd	A-10 Semifinal
2020–21	Jason Dowiak	6-5-1	5-2-1	1st (North)	A-10 Semifinal
2021	Jason Dowiak	11-6-4	5-3-2	4th	A-10 Runner-Up
2022	Jason Dowiak	5-9-5	4-4-2	7th	A-10 Quarterfinal
2023	Jason Dowiak	9-5-4	6-2-2	4th	A-10 Quarterfinal
2024	Jason Dowiak	13-5-3	6-2-2	3rd	A-10 Runner-Up
UMass (Mid-American Conference) (2025–present)
2025	Jason Dowiak	5-8-4	3-6-2	9th	
Total:					
National champion Postseason invitational champion Conference regular season champion Conference regular season and conference tournament champion Division regular season champion Division regular season and conference tournament champion Conference tournament champion
