= Hermann Stadium =

College sports stadium in St. Louis, Missouri, U.S.

Coordinates: 38.634603°N 90.230389°W

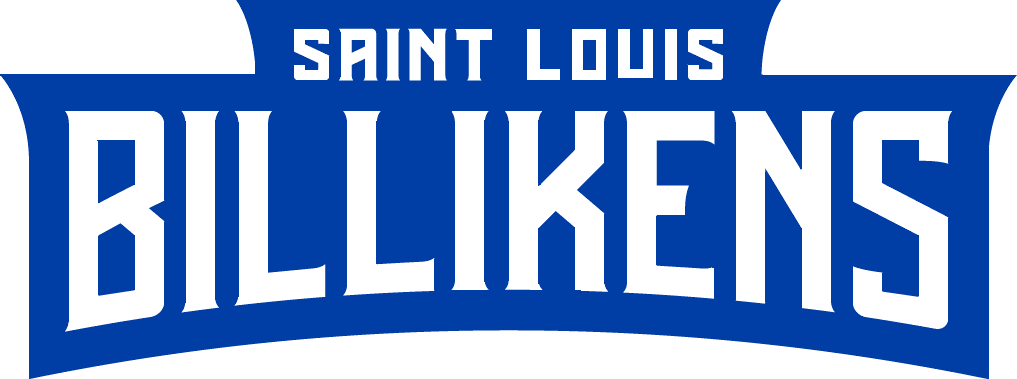

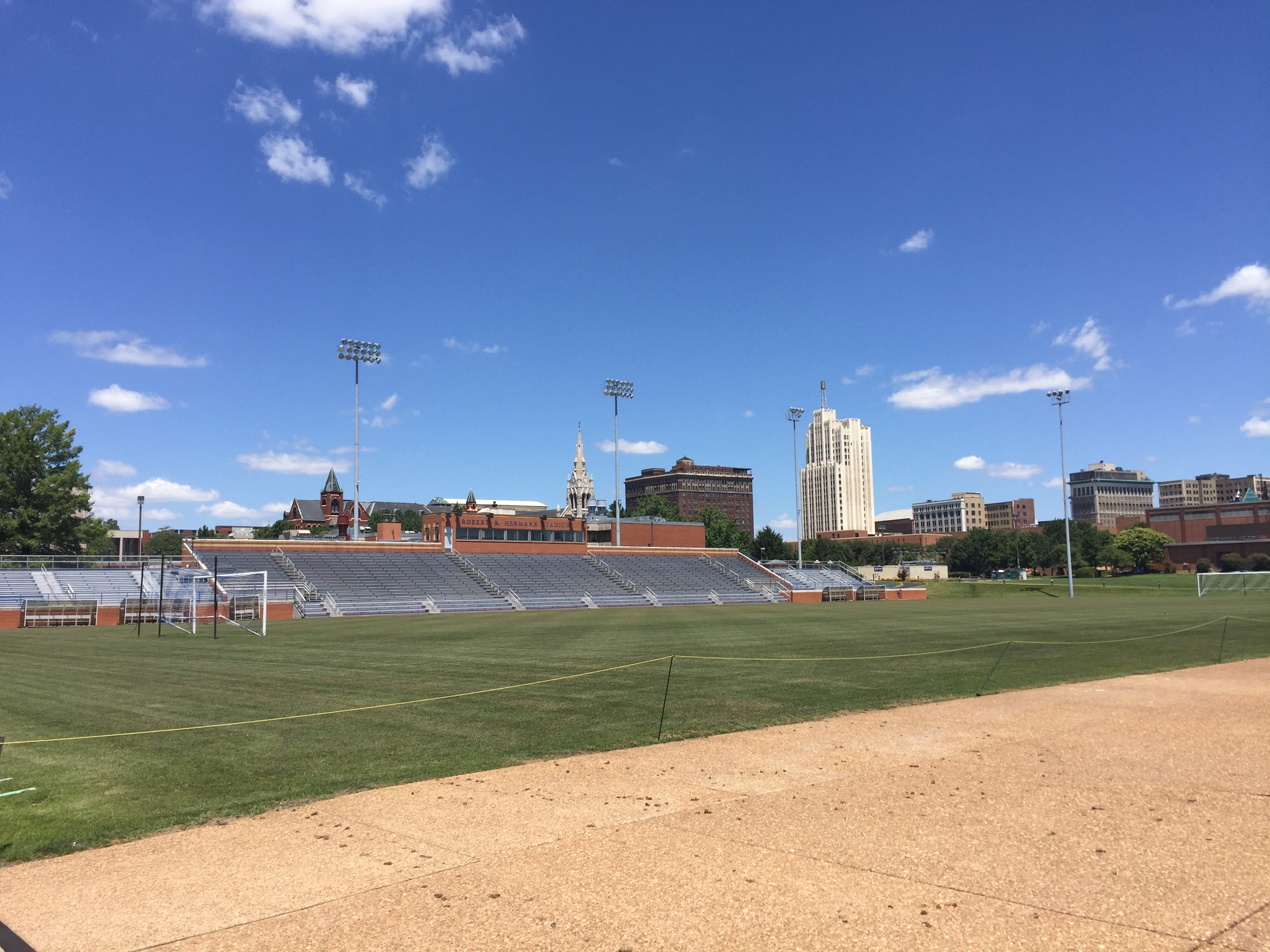
- View of the stadium in 2017
- Interactive map of Hermann Stadium
- Full name: Robert R. Hermann Stadium
- Address: St. Louis, MO; United States
- Owner: Saint Louis University
- Operator: Saint Louis Univ. Athletics
- Executive suites: 6,050
- Type: Soccer-specific stadium
- Field size: 110 x 68 m
- Current use: Soccer

Construction
- Cost: $5.1 million

Tenants
- Saint Louis Billikens (NCAA) teams: men's and women's soccer; Professional teams: St. Louis City 2 (MLS Next Pro)

Website
- slubillikens.com/hermann-stadium-soccer

Robert R. Hermann Stadium is a soccer-specific stadium located in Midtown St. Louis, Missouri, on the campus of Saint Louis University. The first game played was August 21, 1999. This is where both the Billiken men's and women's soccer teams play.

Also, several other events take place here, such as pep rallies and the University's Relay For Life. The seating capacity of the stadium is 6,050. The stadium is named after Bob Hermann.

The Billikens play on a regulation 120x75-yard pitch.

The Billiken men's team christened Hermann Stadium by knocking off defending national champion and preseason No. 1 Indiana 3–2 in an exhibition game on Aug. 21, 1999, before a record on-campus crowd of 6,517.

== Sporting events ==
- 2000 Conference USA Women's Soccer Championships
- 2000 Conference USA Men's Soccer Championships
- 2002 Conference USA Men's Soccer Championships
- 2004 Conference USA Women's Soccer Championships
- 2005 Atlantic 10 Men's Soccer Championships
- 2006 Atlantic 10 Women's Soccer Championships
- 2006 NCAA Men's College Cup
- 2009 Superliga match between Kansas City Wizards and Atlas
- 2011 Atlantic 10 Men's Soccer Championships
- 2013 Warm up arena for the Bosnia and Herzegovina national football team

== See also ==
- Soccer in St. Louis

Events and tenants
Preceded by SAS Soccer Park	Host of the College Cup; 2006	Succeeded by SAS Soccer Park
