= Dayton Flyers women's soccer =

American college soccer team

- Founded: 1984
- University: University of Dayton
- Head coach: Eric Golz
- Conference: Atlantic 10
- Location: Dayton, Ohio, US
- Stadium: Baujan Field
- Nickname: Flyers
- Colors: Red and blue

NCAA tournament Round of 16
- 2001

NCAA tournament Round of 32
- 1999, 2001, 2009, 2010

NCAA tournament appearances
- 1999, 2001, 2002, 2003, 2004, 2009, 2010, 2011, 2014, 2016, 2025

Conference tournament championships
- 1996, 1999, 2001, 2003, 2004, 2009, 2010, 2011, 2014, 2016, 2025

The Dayton Flyers women's soccer team represents University of Dayton in NCAA Division I college soccer. Dayton competes in the Atlantic-10 Conference. The Flyers are led by head coach Eric Golz.

== History ==
The Dayton women's soccer program began in 1984.

The Flyers have been Atlantic 10 Conference Tournament champions 11 times in 1996, 1999, 2001, 2003, 2004, 2009, 2010, 2011, 2014, 2016, 2025.

Dayton has been to the NCAA tournament in 1999, 2001, 2002, 2003, 2004, 2009, 2010, 2011, 2014, 2016, 2025.

In 1999, the Flyers defeated Evansville in the first round. In the Round of 32, they lost to Notre Dame.

In 2001, Dayton defeated Maryland in the first round of the NCAA tournament and Miami in the round of 32. In the Sweet 16, they lost to UCLA.

In 2002, the Flyers did not win the A-10 title and received an at-large NCAA tournament bid. They lost the first round to Virginia.

In 2003, Dayton lost the NCAA tournament first round to Ohio State.

In 2004, the Flyers lost the NCAA tournament first round to Wisconsin.

In 2009, Dayton defeated Marquette in the NCAA tournament first round. In the Round of 32, they lost to Virginia Tech 3-1.

In 2010, the Flyers defeated Virginia Tech in the NCAA first round. In the Round of 32, they lost in a shootout to Ohio State.

In 2011, Dayton was knocked out of the NCAA first round by Louisville.

In 2014, the Flyers lost the NCAA first round to Virginia Tech 4-0.

In 2016, Dayton lost in the NCAA first round to Ohio State.

In 2025, the Flyers won their 11th Atlantic-10 tournament title in a penalty kick shootout over Rhode Island.

== Current squad ==
As of November 2026

Note: Flags indicate national team as defined under FIFA eligibility rules; some limited exceptions apply. Players may hold more than one non-FIFA nationality.

No.	Pos.	Nation	Player
0	GK	USA	Avery Strohecker
00	GK	USA	Kasey Cannistraro
1	GK	USA	Avery Vukmanic
2	MF	USA	Millie Cluxton
3	DF	USA	Claire Mikola
4	DF	AUS	Sophia Doumos
5	DF	USA	Bre Mendoza
7	MF	USA	Campbell Wood
8	DF	USA	Caroline Schork
9	FW	USA	Reese Gallagher
11	MF	USA	Liv Grenda
12	MF	USA	Lauryn Contini
13	FW	USA	Emery Newlin

No.	Pos.	Nation	Player
14	DF	USA	Eva Schreiber
15	DF	USA	Emery Aschenbrener
17	FW	USA	Kelly McCandless
18	MF	USA	Delaney Rollins
19	FW	USA	Maddie Bowman
20	FW	USA	Olivia Baca
21	MF	USA	Elise Canter
22	MF	USA	Ella Lamb
25	FW	USA	Ky Hau-Golden
26	FW	USA	Laney Smith
27	DF	USA	Mackenzie Russell
28	DF	USA	Kamryn Hoffman
33	DF	USA	Lauren Fields
