= Davidson Wildcats =

Sports teams of Davidson College, North Carolina, U.S.

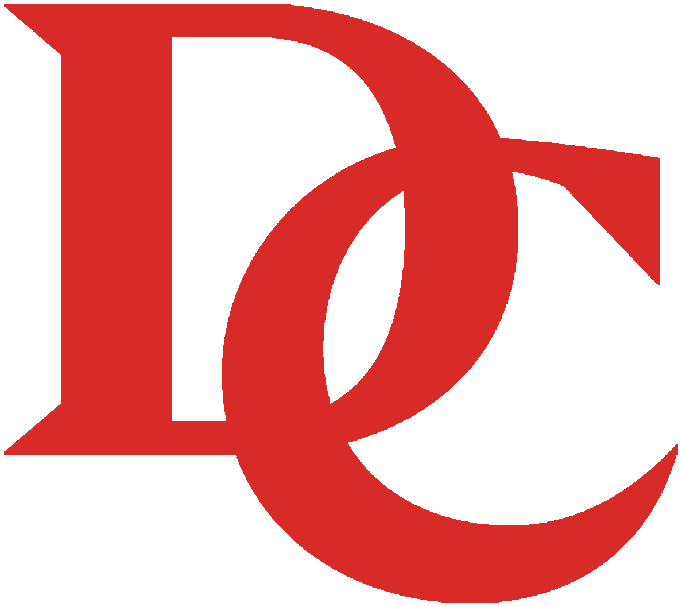
- University: Davidson College
- Nickname: Wildcats
- NCAA: Division I (FCS)
- Conference: Atlantic 10 Conference (primary); Pioneer Football League; Southern Conference (wrestling)
- President: Douglas A. Hicks
- Athletic director: Chris Clunie
- Location: Davidson, North Carolina, U.S.
- Varsity teams: 19
- Football stadium: Davidson College Stadium
- Basketball arena: John M. Belk Arena
- Baseball stadium: T. Henry Wilson Jr. Field
- Colors: Red and black
- Website: davidsonwildcats.com

The Davidson Wildcats are the NCAA Division I intercollegiate athletics teams representing Davidson College of Davidson, North Carolina, United States. A member of the Atlantic 10 Conference (A-10), Davidson College sponsors teams in ten men's and nine women's NCAA sanctioned sports.

The Wildcats previously competed in the Southern Conference, and the wrestling team retains associate membership in that league since the sport is not sponsored by the A-10. The football team is a member of the Pioneer Football League, a Football Championship Subdivision (FCS) conference of schools that do not offer athletic scholarships for football.

In 2026, the Davidson Wildcats women's lacrosse team won its first Atlantic 10 Conference championship and advanced to the NCAA Division I women's lacrosse tournament for the first time in program history.

== Sports sponsored ==
Men's sports	Women's sports
Baseball	Basketball
Basketball	Cross country
Cross country	Field hockey
Football	Lacrosse
Golf	Soccer
Soccer	Swimming and diving
Swimming and diving	Tennis
Tennis	Track and field^{†}
Track and field^{†}	Volleyball
Wrestling	
† – Track and field includes both indoor and outdoor

== Championships ==
=== Team national championships ===
Sport	Association	Division	Year	Opponent/Runner-up	Score
Women's tennis (1)	NCAA	Division III	1984	UC San Diego	15–14

== Individual programs ==
=== Football ===
Bowl Games

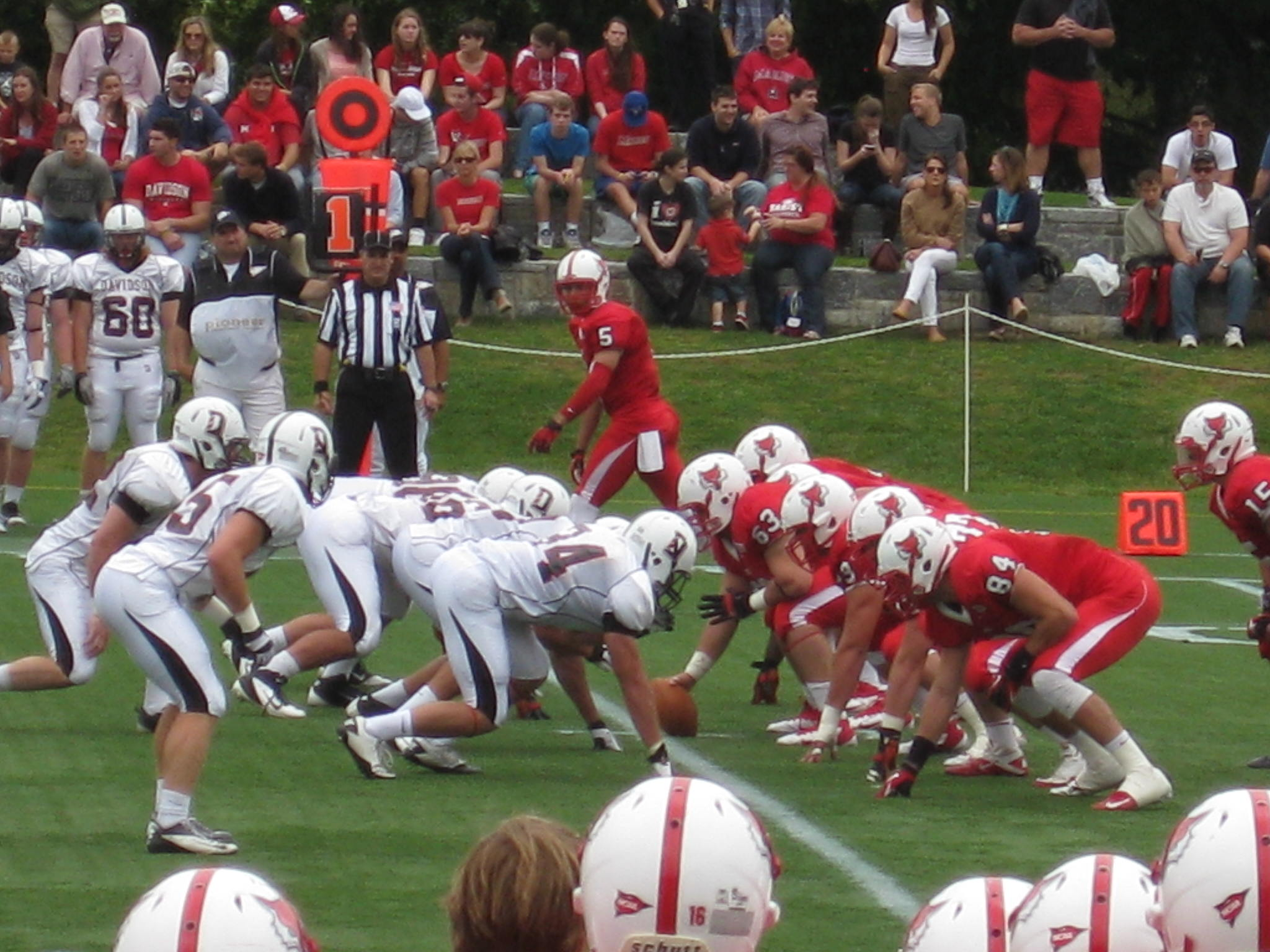
Davidson v Marist game in 2012

Season	Bowl	Winner		Loser	
1969	Tangerine Bowl	Toledo	56	Davidson	33
1990	Exhibition Bowl	Davidson	35	Baptist	17
1994	Bermuda Bowl	Davidson	28	Sewanee	14

=== Men's basketball ===
Davidson's basketball team first reached considerable success in the 1960s under Coach Lefty Driesell, when Sports Illustrated ranked it No. 1 in the country prior to the 1964–65 season.

The Wildcat men have competed in 15 NCAA tournaments (1966, 1968, 1969, 1970, 1986, 1998, 2002, 2006, 2007, 2008, 2012, 2013, 2015, 2018, and 2022). Their last tournament victory was in 2008 over Wisconsin in the Sweet Sixteen. With that victory, the Wildcats advanced to the Elite Eight where they lost to the eventual champion Kansas Jayhawks 59–57, capping off an incredible run that saw the rise of Stephen Curry to national prominence. The Wildcats' NCAA Tournament run came after finishing their regular season undefeated in conference play, at 20–0, and as the champions of the Southern Conference tournament. Curry led the nation in scoring in 2008–09, his last season at Davidson before declaring for the 2009 NBA Draft.

Bob McKillop was the long time coach for the Wildcats, from 1989–2022, and had a 634–380 record during those years. His son, Matt McKillop, took over as head coach. In 2006–07, the team completed its regular-season conference schedule with only one loss and entered the Southern Conference tournament as a No. 1 seed, where the team would win the Southern Conference tournament for the second consecutive season.

In 2005–06, the Wildcats went 20–10 and earned an automatic bid to the NCAA tournament after winning the Southern Conference tournament. In 2004–05, the Wildcats were undefeated in conference play at 16–0 and advanced to the third round of the NIT. In 2001–02, the Wildcats won the Southern Conference tournament and lost a close game to Ohio State in the first round of the NCAA tournament.

In addition to Driesell and McKillop, a number of notable NCAA men's basketball head coaches have coached at Davidson. Matt Doherty, former head coach of SMU, Notre Dame, North Carolina and Florida Atlantic, experienced his first coaching job as an assistant under McKillop, who, not coincidentally, was Doherty's high school coach on Long Island. Former Virginia head coach and current East Carolina athletic director Terry Holland is a Davidson graduate (Class of 1964) and was Driesell's first recruit at Davidson, before advancing to assistant coaching, head coaching and athletic director duties at Davidson. Larry Brown, who would go on to win an NCAA championship with Kansas in 1988 and NBA championship with Detroit in 2004, began his nomadic head coaching career at Davidson, managing to depart before the start of his first season. Jim Larrañaga, who took George Mason to the 2006 Final Four, is a former Davidson assistant coach. Rick Barnes of Texas was also a Davidson assistant.

=== Men's soccer ===
Atlantic 10 Conference logo in Davidson's colors

The men's soccer team at Davidson was declared a varsity sport in 1956 and had their first All-American player, Claude Finney, just four years later in 1960.

The peak of the soccer program was in 1992 when the team made a run to the NCAA Men's Soccer Tournament Final Four. Led by two-time All-American Rob Ukrop, Davidson finished the regular season 17–5–5, earning an at-large invitation to the NCAA Tournament. Three electrifying wins — two on penalty kicks and one in sudden death overtime — propelled Davidson into the Final Four, which miraculously was being hosted by Davidson on the school's campus. Davidson lost 3–2 in overtime against San Diego in the semifinal game, but the team received plenty of accolades. Ukrop led the nation with 31 goals and 72 points and was awarded the Adi Dassler Award, given to the nation's best player. Head coach Charlie Slagle was awarded NCAA Division I Coach of the Year for men's soccer. Remarkably, all of this was accomplished without the use of a single athletic scholarship on the 1992 team, leading The New York Times to herald the team as "22 educated feet."

=== Wrestling ===
The Wildcats wrestling team is coached by Andy Lausier. The team was established in 1920 and has won 293 dual meets, lost 601, and tied 18. The Wildcats last winning season came in 2004–2005 under the coaching of T. J. Jaworsky and Bob Patnesky. Davidson has never had an All-American wrestler at the NCAA Wrestling Team Championship and has had just eleven Southern Conference champions through 2018.

=== Baseball ===
The Davidson Wildcats baseball team is a varsity intercollegiate athletic team of Davidson College in Davidson, North Carolina, USA. The team is a member of the Atlantic 10 Conference, which is part of the National Collegiate Athletic Association's Division I. Davidson's first baseball team was fielded in 1902. The team plays its home games at T. Henry Wilson, Jr. Field in Davidson, North Carolina. The Wildcats are coached by Dick Cooke.

== Club sports ==
=== Croquet ===
Davidson's two-man golf croquet team has won the National Collegiate Croquet Championship in 2007, 2008, and 2010.
