= La Salle Explorers =

Intercollegiate sports teams of La Salle University

- University: La Salle University
- Nickname: The Explorers
- NCAA: Division I
- Conference: A-10 (primary); MAAC (women's water polo)
- Athletic director: Jarett Gerald
- Location: Philadelphia, Pennsylvania
- Varsity teams: 23
- Basketball arena: John Glaser Arena
- Baseball stadium: Hank DeVincent Field
- Soccer stadium: McCarthy Stadium
- Aquatics center: Kirk Pool
- Colors: Blue and gold
- Mascot: The Explorer
- Fight song: Fight On, Explorers
- Website: goexplorers.com
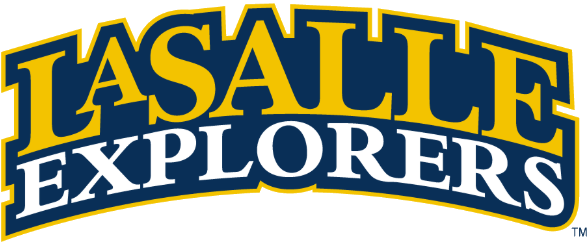

The La Salle Explorers are the varsity sports teams from La Salle University in Philadelphia. The Explorers compete in NCAA Division I as members of the Atlantic 10 Conference. The men's and women's basketball teams also participate in the Philadelphia Big 5. On June 3, 2019, Brian Baptiste was named director of athletics and recreation effective August 1, 2019. Baptiste is deputy AD for capital projects and operations at Northwestern University. On July 6, 2026, Jarett Gerald was announced as the next Vice President of Athletics & Recreation and Director of Athletics. He most recently served as the Assistant Athletics Director for Major Gifts at the University of Missouri.

== Overview ==
=== The Explorers name ===
The Explorers nickname derives from a famous mistake made by a local Philadelphia sportswriter. The writer thought the university was named after the French explorer Sieur de La Salle, when in fact it is named after St. Jean-Baptiste de la Salle. The nickname caught on, however, and has remained ever since.

=== The rivalry ===
La Salle's major historic rival has been the Hawks of the Saint Joseph's University, especially in men's basketball. Not only are both schools situated in Philadelphia, but they are also both Catholic, private institutions and are both members of both the Atlantic 10 and the Big 5.

=== National championships ===
La Salle's teams have won two national championships: the 1954 NCAA Men's Division I Basketball Tournament and the 1980 AIAW Field Hockey Championship.

The school also won the 1952 National Invitation Tournament when that tournament was still considered to be on par with the NCAA tournament.

== Sports sponsored ==
Men's sports	Women's sports
Baseball	Acrobatics & tumbling
Basketball	Basketball
Cross country	Cross country
Golf	Field hockey
Rowing	Golf
Soccer	Lacrosse
Swimming & diving	Rowing
Track & field^{1}	Rugby
	Soccer
	Swimming and diving
	Track and field^{1}
	Triathlon
	Water polo
† – Track and field includes both indoor and outdoor

Notes

A member of the Atlantic 10 Conference, La Salle University sponsors teams in 7 men's and 11 women's NCAA sanctioned sports, plus one men's sport that is not recognized by the NCAA. The most recently added varsity sports are women's golf and men's and women's water polo, all added for 2016–17. Baseball was dropped after the 2021 season (2020–21 school year), but was reinstated for the 2026 season. At the same time that baseball was reinstated, La Salle added three new women's sports, all included in the NCAA Emerging Sports for Women program—acrobatics & tumbling, rugby, and triathlon.

=== Men's basketball ===
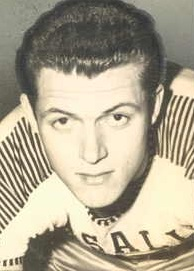
LaSalle alumnus Tom Gola, who went on to play with the Philadelphia Warriors and New York Knicks from 1955 to 1966, namesake of Tom Gola Arena

The program has been rated the 53rd "Greatest College Basketball Program of All-Time" by Street & Smith's magazine and 71st by the ESPN College Basketball Encyclopedia.

La Salle has won one National Championship, one National Invitation Tournament Championship, and advanced to two Final Fours. The Explorers have also made 12 NCAA Tournament appearances, won eight Philadelphia Big 5 city championships, and four Metro Atlantic Athletic Conference Championships. The program is one of only two schools (with Houston) to have two players in the top 25 in all-time NCAA scoring - Lionel Simmons and Michael Brooks. It's also had three National Players of the Year - only Duke University and Ohio State have had more.

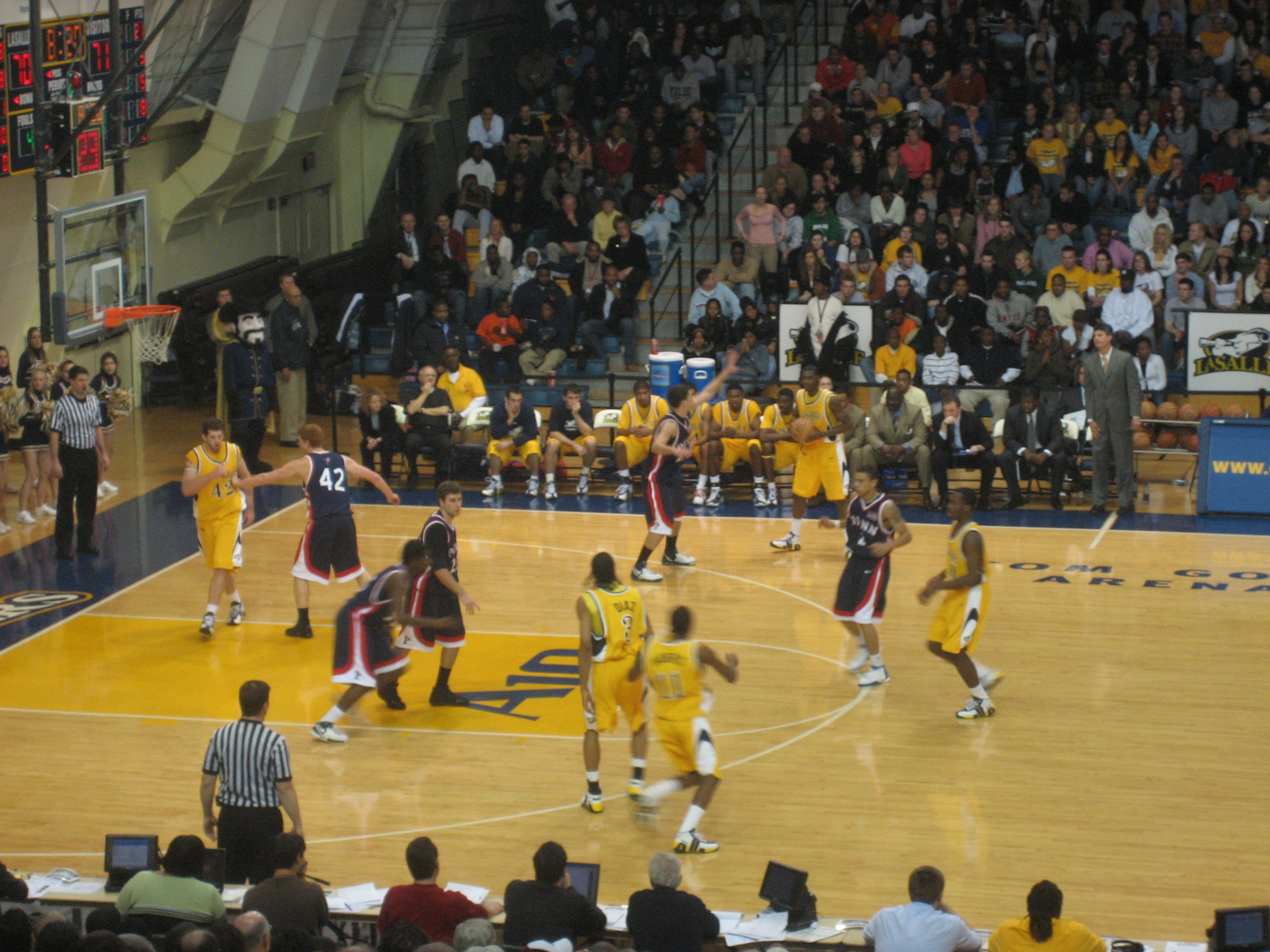
The team playing at Tom Gola Arena in January 2007

La Salle's last successful run in the NCAA Tournament a surprising run in 2013 when La Salle went to the Sweet Sixteen as an underdog. The Explorers pulled off surprise upsets, beating ranked Kansas State and Ole Miss.

La Salle also has an extensive history of players who played professional basketball, including Michael Brooks, (1980 College Player of the Year), Joe Bryant (father of Kobe Bryant), Rasual Butler (formerly with the Washington Wizards), Larry Cannon, Ken Durrett, Tom Gola, (NBA Hall of Fame inductee and 1955 College Player of the Year), and Tim Legler (current basketball analyst for ESPN and 4th all-time in NBA three-point shooting percentage).

The Explorers played in Tom Gola Arena as their main home stadium from 1998 to 2024. Following the 2023-24 season, Tom Gola Arena was renovated and is now known as John Glaser Arena. The new arena is named after John E. Glaser, an alumnus and doner who provided funds for the arena renovation. The Explorers play at Xfinity Mobile Arena for Big 5 Classic games as part of the Philadelphia Big 5.

The men's basketball team has won eight City Championships (four were shared). In addition to the national championship and NIT Championship, La Salle was also a national finalist in the 1955 NCAA Men's Division I Basketball Tournament and was named the 53rd "Greatest College Basketball Program of All-Time" by Street & Smith's in January 2005.

Only Duke (7) and UCLA (4) have had more National Players of the Year than La Salle, which has had three--- Lionel Simmons, Michael Brooks, and Tom Gola. Tom Gola was listed on "ESPN's Countdown to the Greatest" College basketball players as #17.

=== Women's basketball ===
Atlantic 10 Conference logo in La Salle colors

The women's basketball team began play in the 1972–73 season, and has been to the NCAA Division I women's basketball tournament 5 times.

=== Football ===
La Salle discontinued football at the end the 2007 season.

=== Wrestling ===
La Salle wrestling was dropped from the varsity sports program in 1998.

=== Club sports ===
In addition to its varsity sports, La Salle also sponsors a number of club sports. These include:

- Ice hockey
- Men's Lacrosse
- Men's Rugby
- Ultimate Frisbee
- Women's Rugby
- Wrestling

== See also ==
- Philadelphia Sports Hall of Fame
- Sports in Philadelphia#Collegiate sports
