= VCU Rams women's soccer =

American college soccer team

- Founded: 1954; 72 years ago
- University: Virginia Commonwealth University
- Head coach: Lauryn Hutchinson (2nd season)
- Conference: A-10
- Location: Richmond, Virginia, US
- Stadium: Sports Backers Stadium (capacity: 3,250)
- Nickname: Rams
- Colors: Black and gold
Home	Away

NCAA tournament Round of 32
- 2005

NCAA tournament appearances
- 2004, 2005

The VCU Rams women's soccer team is an intercollegiate varsity sports team of Virginia Commonwealth University. The team is a member of the Atlantic 10 Conference of the National Collegiate Athletic Association.

== Colors and badge ==
The team uses the school colors of black and gold.

== Stadium ==
VCU plays at Sports Backers Stadium which opened in 1999 and has a maximum capacity of 3,250.

== Players ==
=== Current squad ===
As of November 2026

Note: Flags indicate national team as defined under FIFA eligibility rules; some limited exceptions apply. Players may hold more than one non-FIFA nationality.

No.	Pos.	Nation	Player
0	GK	USA	Mia Pongratz
1	GK	USA	Ameerah Maamry
2	MF	USA	Keira McCloskey
3	MF	USA	Estella Gajarsky-Prado
4	DF	USA	Maddie Ellis
5	DF	USA	Ava Lozada
6	DF	USA	Kate Weyer
7	FW	USA	Jensyn Lins
8	MF	CRC	Luciana González
9	DF	USA	Brianna Lawrence
10	MF	USA	Tatum Scialdone
11	DF	USA	Ishpreen Marwah
12	DF	USA	Cierra Collins
13	FW	USA	Isabelle Franklin

No.	Pos.	Nation	Player
14	FW	USA	Jazmin Jackson
15	MF	USA	Mina Stevens
16	DF	USA	Taleah James
17	MF	USA	Sarah Drooger
18	MF	USA	Jess Gotshall
19	FW	USA	Jayla Walton
20	DF	ENG	Bo Price
21	DF	USA	Reese Paciorek
22	MF	USA	Vivian Vendt
23	DF	USA	Kaylee Risher
25	FW	USA	Alexis Cox
27	GK	USA	Cameryn Nunn
29	MF	JPN	Shiori Shintaku
30	FW	USA	Monique McEnhimer
