= Saint Louis Billikens women's soccer =

American college soccer team

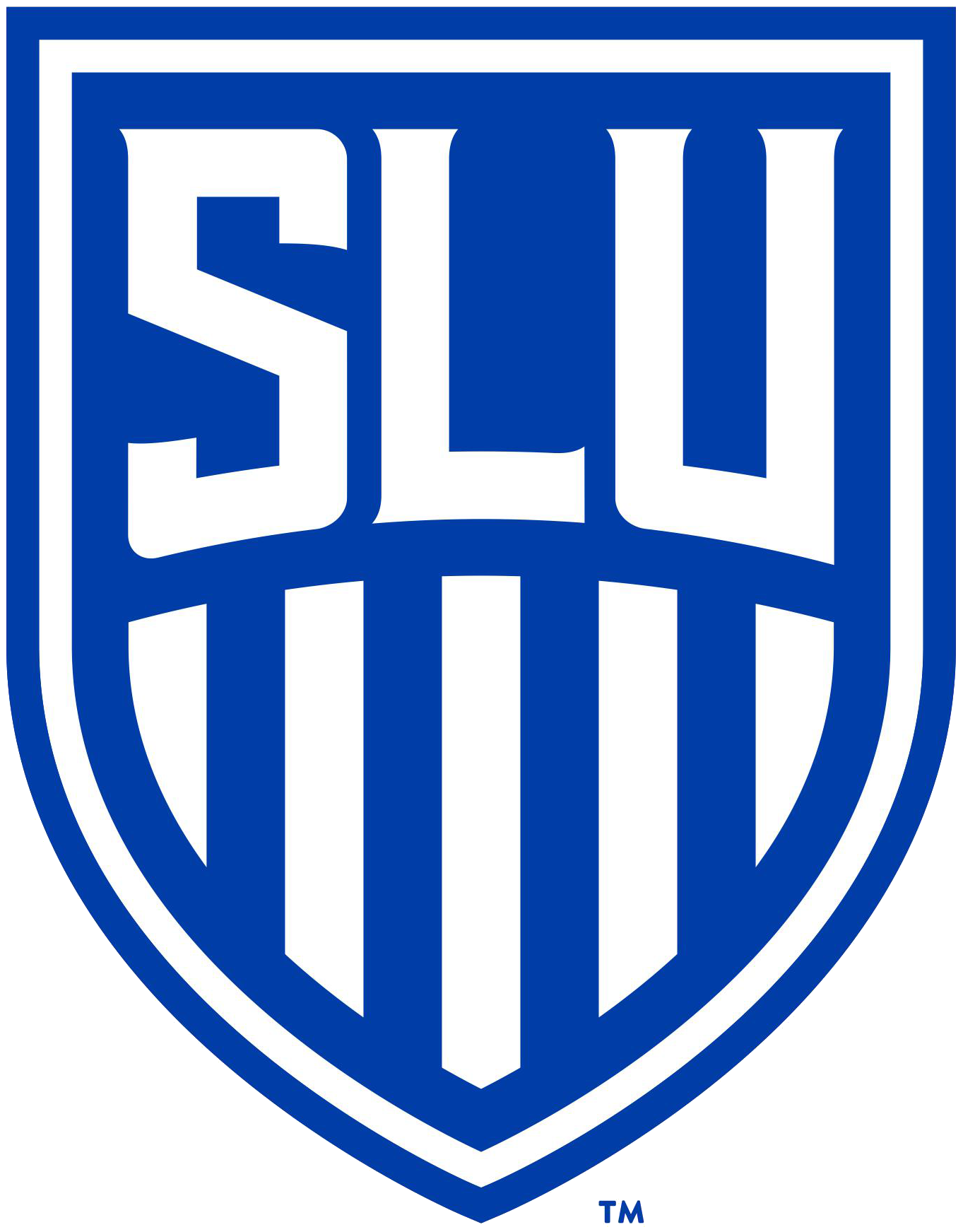
- University: Saint Louis University
- Head coach: Katie Shields (8th season)
- Conference: Atlantic 10
- Location: St. Louis, Missouri, US
- Stadium: Hermann Stadium (capacity: 6,050)
- Nickname: Billikens
- Colors: SLU blue and white
Home	Away

NCAA tournament Round of 16
- 2023

NCAA tournament Round of 32
- 2005, 2006, 2020, 2021, 2023, 2024

NCAA tournament appearances
- 2005, 2006, 2018, 2019, 2020, 2021, 2022, 2023, 2024

Conference tournament championships
- 2005, 2006, 2018, 2019, 2020, 2021, 2022, 2023, 2024

Conference regular season championships
- 1999, 2004, 2005, 2018, 2019, 2020, 2022, 2023, 2024

Saint Louis Billikens women's soccer team is the women's soccer team that represents Saint Louis University. The team was formed in 1996 and plays its home matches at Hermann Stadium in Midtown, St. Louis, Missouri.

Katie Shields is the current coach, the third in the program's history. The Billikens have made four appearances in the NCAA tournament.

== Players ==
=== Current roster ===
As of November 2026

Note: Flags indicate national team as defined under FIFA eligibility rules; some limited exceptions apply. Players may hold more than one non-FIFA nationality.

No.	Pos.	Nation	Player
0	GK	USA	Pepper Escher
00	GK	USA	Nimu Karani
1	GK	USA	Emma Parker
2	MF	USA	Lucie Schwartz
3	FW	USA	Adee Broesder
4	MF	USA	Ava Rademeyer
5	FW	USA	Hope Kim
7	FW	USA	Addison Stanciak
8	MF	USA	Ashley Miller
9	FW	USA	Audrey Smith
10	MF	USA	Jeanette Fieldsend
11	MF	USA	Nina Preusser
12	FW	USA	Emma Naftanel

No.	Pos.	Nation	Player
14	DF	USA	Hana Allen
15	FW	USA	Leah Simpson
16	FW	USA	Keira Bartholet
17	MF	USA	Caroline Chier
18	FW	USA	Gianna Harris
19	DF	USA	Avery Rasmussen
20	DF	USA	Lauren Zangara
21	DF	USA	Camille Welker
22	DF	USA	Lucy Marsh
23	DF	USA	Caroline Fowlkes
24	DF	USA	Ava Scorfina
25	DF	USA	Blakely Hockett

== Coaches ==
=== Coaching history ===
Tenure	Coach
1996–2011	Tim Champion
2012	Kat Mertz
2013–present	Katie Shields

== Seasons ==
Season	Head coach	Season result							Tournament results	
Season	Head coach	Overall			Conference				Conference	NCAA
Season	Head coach	Wins	Losses	Ties	Wins	Losses	Ties	Finish	Conference	NCAA
1996	Tim Champion	12	6	2	6	3	0	3rd	Semifinal	DNQ
1997	Tim Champion	11	5	4	4	4	1	5th	Quarterfinal	DNQ
1998	Tim Champion	7	12	1	4	7	0	7th	Quarterfinal	DNQ
1999	Tim Champion	14	3	3	8	1	2	Champions	Quarterfinal	DNQ
2000	Tim Champion	13	5	3	8	0	3	2nd	Semifinal	DNQ
2001	Tim Champion	8	10	1	5	4	1	8th	Quarterfinal	DNQ
2002	Tim Champion	13	6	1	6	3	1	3rd	Quarterfinal	DNQ
2003	Tim Champion	14	5	3	6	3	1	5th	Runners Up	DNQ
2004	Tim Champion	15	6	1	9	1	0	Champions	Runners Up	DNQ
2005	Tim Champion	16	5	0	8	0	0	Champions	Champions	Second Round
2006	Tim Champion	15	4	2	7	2	0	2nd	Champions	Second Round
2007	Tim Champion	10	6	2	7	2	2	4th	First Round	DNQ
2008	Tim Champion	11	6	4	6	4	1	4th	Semifinal	DNQ
2009	Tim Champion	8	9	4	4	4	3	5th	Semifinal	DNQ
2010	Tim Champion	4	9	6	3	5	1	9th	DNQ	DNQ
2011	Tim Champion	5	10	3	3	5	1	8th	DNQ	DNQ
2012	Kat Mertz	5	9	4	3	4	2	12th	DNQ	DNQ
2013	Katie Shields	6	10	3	5	2	1	3rd	First Round	DNQ
2014	Katie Shields	8	10	0	3	5	0	9th	DNQ	DNQ
2015	Katie Shields	8	9	2	2	6	2	13th	DNQ	DNQ
2016	Katie Shields	14	4	2	7	1	2	2nd	Quarterfinal	DNQ
2017	Katie Shields	15	3	2	7	2	1	2nd	Quarterfinal	DNQ
2018	Katie Shields	18	4	1	10	0	0	Champions	Champions	First Round
2019	Katie Shields	17	4	2	9	0	1	Champions	Champions	First Round
2020	Katie Shields	15	1	1	8	0	0	Champions	Champions	Second Round
2021	Katie Shields	13	9	1	7	3	0	3rd	Champions	Second Round
2022	Katie Shields	20	2	0	10	0	0	Champions	Champions	First Round
2023	Katie Shields	19	3	2	9	0	1	Champions	Champions	Third Round
2024	Katie Shields	15	2	6	7	0	3	Champions	Champions	Second Round
2025	Katie Shields	13	3	2	8	1	1	2nd	Semifinal	DNQ
