= 2017 NCAA Division I women's soccer tournament =

2017 NCAA women's soccer tournament
- 2017 Women's College Cup logo

Tournament details
- Country: United States
- Dates: November 10– December 3, 2017
- Teams: 64

Final positions
- Champions: Stanford (2nd title)
- Runners-up: UCLA
- Semifinalists: South Carolina; Duke

Tournament statistics
- Matches played: 63
- Goals scored: 203 (3.22 per match)

The 2017 NCAA Division I women's soccer tournament (semifinals and final also known as the 2017 Women's College Cup) was the 36th annual single-elimination tournament to determine the national champion of NCAA Division I women's collegiate soccer. The semifinals and championship game were played at Orlando City Stadium in Orlando, Florida on December 1 and 3, 2017, while the preceding rounds were played at various sites across the country during November 2017. The Stanford Cardinal were tournament champions, winning the final 3–2 over the UCLA Bruins.

== Qualification ==
All Division I women's soccer programs were eligible to qualify for the tournament. 64 teams participated in the tournament. 28 teams qualified automatically by winning their conference tournaments and 3 teams qualified automatically by winning their conference regular-season championship (Ivy League, Pac-12 Conference, and West Coast Conference grant their automatic qualifications to the regular-season champions in lieu of holding a conference tournament). The remaining 33 teams were selected at-large by the NCAA Division I Women's Soccer Committee.

=== Stanford Bracket ===
| Seed | School | Conference | Berth Type | Record | RPI | Appearance | Last bid |
|---|---|---|---|---|---|---|---|
| 1 | Stanford | Pac-12 | Automatic | 18–1–0 | 1 | 27th | 2016 |
| 2 | West Virginia | Big 12 | At-large | 15–3–2 | 7 | 18th | 2016 |
| 3 | Penn State | Big Ten | Automatic | 12–4–4 | 10 | 23rd | 2016 |
| 4 | Florida State | ACC | At-large | 11–6–1 | 16 | 18th | 2016 |
| | Arizona | Pac-12 | At-large | 10–4–4 | 26 | 5th | 2015 |
| | Auburn | SEC | At-large | 7–6–5 | 27 | 15th | 2016 |
| | Bucknell | Patriot | Automatic | 12–8–0 | 81 | 4th | 2016 |
| | Georgetown | Big East | Automatic | 14–3–3 | 22 | 8th | 2016 |
| | Hofstra | CAA | Automatic | 15–3–2 | 23 | 6th | 2015 |
| | La Salle | Atlantic 10 | Automatic | 17–3–2 | 47 | 5th | 2014 |
| | Ole Miss | SEC | At-large | 10–6–3 | 40 | 7th | 2015 |
| | Rutgers | Big Ten | At-large | 12–2–5 | 11 | 12th | 2016 |
| | Stony Brook | America East | Automatic | 11–10–0 | 158 | 2nd | 2012 |
| | TCU | Big 12 | At-large | 12–6–3 | 46 | 2nd | 2016 |
| | Utah Valley | WAC | Automatic | 10–11–1 | 213 | 2nd | 2015 |
| | Wake Forest | ACC | At-large | 11–5–3 | 42 | 19th | 2013 |

=== South Carolina Bracket ===
| Seed | School | Conference | Berth Type | Record | RPI | Appearance | Last bid |
|---|---|---|---|---|---|---|---|
| 1 | South Carolina | SEC | At-large | 15–2–1 | 3 | 11th | 2016 |
| 2 | UCF | American | At-large | 13–1–3 | 5 | 21st | 2015 |
| 3 | Florida | SEC | At-large | 14–6–0 | 19 | 21st | 2016 |
| 4 | Ohio State | Big Ten | At-large | 15–4–1 | 17 | 12th | 2016 |
| | Alabama State | SWAC | Automatic | 12–7–1 | 229 | 2nd | 2016 |
| | California | Pac-12 | At-large | 13–5–1 | 25 | 25th | 2016 |
| | Florida Gulf Coast | Atlantic Sun | Automatic | 14–3–1 | 35 | 6th | 2016 |
| | Murray State | OVC | Automatic | 15–1–2 | 21 | 3rd | 2015 |
| | Santa Clara | WCC | At-large | 13–6–1 | 31 | 27th | 2016 |
| | South Alabama | Sun Belt | Automatic | 12–3–2 | 61 | 5th | 2016 |
| | South Florida | American | Automatic | 12–3–2 | 15 | 4th | 2015 |
| | Tennessee | SEC | At-large | 14–4–1 | 20 | 11th | 2012 |
| | Toledo | MAC | Automatic | 12–7–3 | 124 | 5th | 2011 |
| | Vanderbilt | SEC | At-large | 12–6–2 | 39 | 8th | 2006 |
| | Washington State | Pac-12 | At-large | 9–7–3 | 49 | 11th | 2015 |
| | Wisconsin | Big Ten | At-large | 13–5–2 | 29 | 20th | 2016 |

=== Duke Bracket ===
| Seed | School | Conference | Berth Type | Record | RPI | Appearance | Last bid |
|---|---|---|---|---|---|---|---|
| 1 | Duke | ACC | At-large | 19–2–0 | 4 | 23rd | 2016 |
| 2 | Texas A&M | SEC | Automatic | 17–2–1 | 6 | 23rd | 2016 |
| 3 | USC | Pac-12 | At-large | 14–3–1 | 18 | 16th | 2016 |
| 4 | Texas | Big 12 | At-large | 13–3–2 | 12 | 12th | 2014 |
| | Alabama | SEC | At-large | 12–7–1 | 28 | 3rd | 2011 |
| | Baylor | Big 12 | Automatic | 13–5–2 | 34 | 5th | 2012 |
| | Clemson | ACC | At-large | 9–5–3 | 38 | 18th | 2016 |
| | Eastern Washington | Big Sky | Automatic | 16–5–1 | 84 | 2nd | 2016 |
| | IUPUI | Horizon | Automatic | 14–5–3 | 122 | 2nd | 2009 |
| | Lamar | Southland | Automatic | 18–3–1 | 72 | 1st | Never |
| | Missouri State | MVC | Automatic | 10–9–1 | 119 | 2nd | 2000 |
| | North Texas | Conference USA | Automatic | 14–3–4 | 65 | 5th | 2015 |
| | Notre Dame | ACC | At-large | 9–6–4 | 14 | 25th | 2016 |
| | Oklahoma State | Big 12 | At-large | 16–3–2 | 32 | 11th | 2016 |
| | Rice | Conference USA | At-large | 12–3–2 | 36 | 4th | 2014 |
| | UNC Greensboro | Southern | Automatic | 11–7–3 | 104 | 10th | 2010 |

=== North Carolina Bracket ===
| Seed | School | Conference | Berth Type | Record | RPI | Appearance | Last bid |
|---|---|---|---|---|---|---|---|
| 1 | North Carolina | ACC | Automatic | 15–2–2 | 2 | 36th | 2016 |
| 2 | UCLA | Pac-12 | At-large | 15–2–2 | 8 | 21st | 2016 |
| 3 | Virginia | ACC | At-large | 11–5–4 | 23 | 30th | 2016 |
| 4 | Princeton | Ivy | Automatic | 14–2–0 | 9 | 12th | 2015 |
| | Arkansas | SEC | At-large | 11–10–2 | 41 | 4th | 2016 |
| | Butler | Big East | At-large | 13–2–5 | 45 | 2nd | 2015 |
| | Cal State Fullerton | Big West | Automatic | 12–5–4 | 94 | 7th | 2014 |
| | Colorado | Pac-12 | At-large | 11–5–4 | 43 | 10th | 2016 |
| | Denver | Summit | Automatic | 11–8–1 | 225 | 10th | 2013 |
| | High Point | Big South | Automatic | 13–7–1 | 99 | 6th | 2014 |
| | Monmouth | MAAC | Automatic | 15–3–2 | 37 | 5th | 2016 |
| | NC State | ACC | At-large | 14–5–1 | 30 | 13th | 2016 |
| | Northwestern | Big Ten | At-large | 12–7–2 | 33 | 5th | 2016 |
| | Pepperdine | WCC | Automatic | 14–2–3 | 13 | 10th | 2016 |
| | Saint Francis (PA) | NEC | Automatic | 10–7–3 | 176 | 4th | 2016 |
| | San Diego State | Mountain West | Automatic | 12–7–2 | 80 | 7th | 2014 |

== Bracket ==
The bracket was announced on Monday, November 6.

=== Stanford Bracket ===
First round November 10–11; Campus Sites
1 | Stanford* | 9
Utah Valley | 1
Hofstra | 0
Auburn* | 1
Arizona* | 2
TCU | 1
Ole Miss | 0
4 | Florida State* | 5
3 | Penn State* | 7
Stony Brook | 0
Georgetown | 0 (1)
Wake Forest* | 0 (2)
Rutgers* | 3
La Salle | 1
Bucknell | 0
2 | West Virginia* | 3

Second round November 17; Regional Campus Sites
1 | Stanford* | 2
Auburn | 0
Arizona | 0
4 | Florida State | 2
3 | Penn State | 2
Wake Forest | 0
Rutgers | 0 (3)
2 | West Virginia* | 0 (4)

Round of 16; November 19; Regional Campus Sites
1 | Stanford* | 1
4 | Florida State | 0
3 | Penn State | 3
2 | West Virginia* | 1

Quarterfinal; November 24; Campus Sites
1 | Stanford* | 4
3 | Penn State | 0

* Host institution

==== Schedule ====
===== First round =====
| November 10, 2017 | Auburn | 1–0 | Hofstra | Auburn, Alabama |
| 6:00 p.m. CST | Bri Folds 64' | Report | | Stadium: Auburn Soccer Complex; Attendance: 845; Referee: Skye Arthur-Banning; Assistant referees: Jessica Medley; James McKean; Fourth official: Oladokun Faduyile |

| November 10, 2017 | Florida State | 5–0 | Ole Miss | Tallahassee, Florida |
| 7:00 p.m. EST | Deyna Castellanos 4', 28'; Dallas Dorosy 70'; Kaycie Tillman 76'; Gabby Carle 86' | Report | | Stadium: Seminole Soccer Complex; Attendance: 851; Referee: Daniel Gutierrez; Assistant referees: Kevin Huet; Kevin Flynn; Fourth official: Joe LeBlanc |

| November 10, 2017 | #24 Wake Forest | 0–0 (a.e.t.) (2–1 p) | #15 Georgetown | Winston-Salem, North Carolina |
| 7:00 p.m. EST | | Report | | Stadium: Spry Stadium; Referee: Daniel Burak; Assistant referees: Kevin Uitto; Robert Dail; Fourth official: Brian Odenwald |
| | Penalties |
| | Maddie Huster (penalty scored); Hannah Betfort (penalty missed); Bayley Feist (penalty scored); Kahla Seymour (penalty missed) | | (penalty missed) Rachel Corboz; (penalty scored) Meaghan Nally; (penalty missed) Taylor Pak; (penalty missed) Carson Nizialek; (penalty missed) Meghan Shaver |

| November 10, 2017 | #10 Penn State | 7–0 | Stony Brook | State College, Pennsylvania |
| 7:30 p.m. EST | Laura Freigang 11', 19', 38'; Frannie Crouse 33'; Charlotte Williams 65'; Frankie Tagliaferri 83', 84' | Report | | Stadium: Jeffrey Field; Attendance: 636; Referee: John Brady; Assistant referees: Tim Deljanovan; Terrence Mull; Fourth official: Dustin Killick |

| November 10, 2017 | Arizona | 2–1 | TCU | Tucson, Arizona |
| 7:00 p.m. MST | Samantha Falasco 75'; Cali Crisler 81' | Report | 31' Emma Heckendorn | Stadium: Murphey Field at Mulcahy Soccer Stadium; Attendance: 753; Referee: Omeed Azadpour; Assistant referees: Wale Animashaun; Juan Colazo; Fourth official: Charles Farr |

| November 11, 2017 | #7 West Virginia | 3–0 | Bucknell | Morgantown, West Virginia |
| 1:00 p.m. EST | Michaela Abam 16', 47'; Sh'Nia Gordon 58' | Report | | Stadium: Dick Dlesk Soccer Stadium; Attendance: 1,207; Referee: Amadou Diop; Assistant referees: Paul Deverse; Robert Hope; Fourth official: Richard Fulcher |

| November 11, 2017 | #22 Rutgers | 3–1 | La Salle | Piscataway, New Jersey |
| 5:00 p.m. EST | Amirah Ali 52'; Alexa Ferreira 56'; Brittany LaPlant 80' | Report | 65' Madison Bower | Stadium: Yurcak Field; Attendance: 581; Referee: Amber O'Connor; Assistant referees: Brenda Magoba; Scarlet Keane; Fourth official: Hallie Berger |

| November 11, 2017 | #1 Stanford | 9–1 | Utah Valley | Stanford, California |
| 7:00 p.m. PST | Madison Haley 6', 49'; Civana Kuhlmann 9'; Jaye Boissiere 28'; Tierna Davidson 31'; Catarina Macario 32'; Belle Briede 41'; Sam Tran 84', 87' | Report | 17' Libby Weber | Stadium: Laird Q. Cagan Stadium; Attendance: 1,430; Referee: Matthew Buckman; Assistant referees: John Tuggle; Vince Di Nardo; Fourth official: Deleana Quan |

===== Second round =====
| November 17, 2017 | #10 Penn State | 2–0 | #24 Wake Forest | Morgantown, West Virginia |
| 4:00 p.m. EST | Alina Ortega-Jurado 59'; Laura Freigang 66' | Report | | Stadium: Dick Dlesk Soccer Stadium; Attendance: 309; Referee: Sergio Gonzalez; Assistant referees: Lucas Feathers; Brian Opiela; Fourth official: John Groff |

| November 17, 2017 | #7 West Virginia | 0–0 (a.e.t.) (4–3 p) | #22 Rutgers | Morgantown, West Virginia |
| 7:00 p.m. EST | | Report | | Stadium: Dick Dlesk Soccer Stadium; Attendance: 1,554; Referee: Brian Miller; Assistant referees: Eric Weisbrod; Jeffrey Mellen; Fourth official: John Woodruff |
| | Penalties |
| | Carla Portillo (penalty scored); Michaela Abam (penalty missed); Bianca St. Georges (penalty scored); Easther Mayi Kith (penalty scored); Stefany Ferrer-vanGinkel (penalty scored) | | (penalty missed) Taylor Aylmer; (penalty scored) Amirah Ali; (penalty scored) Casey Murphy; (penalty scored) Christy Monroy; (penalty missed) Brianna Starr |

| November 17, 2017 | Florida State | 2–0 | Arizona | Stanford, California |
| 4:30 p.m. PST | Deyna Castellanos 44', 79' | Report | | Stadium: Laird Q. Cagan Stadium; Attendance: 379; Referee: Joseph Dickerson; Assistant referees: Kyle Kazmer; Brandon Chapman; Fourth official: Devlin Creighton |

| November 17, 2017 | #1 Stanford | 2–0 | Auburn | Stanford, California |
| 7:00 p.m. PST | Kyra Carusa 58'; Catarina Macario 67' | Report | | Stadium: Laird Q. Cagan Stadium; Attendance: 1,533; Referee: Alex Del Angel; Assistant referees: Troy Thiele; Devlin Creighton; Fourth official: Kyle Kazmer |

===== Round of 16 =====
| November 19, 2017 | #1 Stanford | 1–0 | Florida State | Stanford, California |
| 1:00 p.m. PST | Jordan DiBiasi 79' | Report | | Stadium: Laird Q. Cagan Stadium; Attendance: 1,485; Referee: Bernhard Hosu; Assistant referees: Deleana Quan; Kristin Patterson; Fourth official: Matthew Buckman |

| November 19, 2017 | #7 West Virginia | 1–3 | #10 Penn State | Morgantown, West Virginia |
| 5:00 p.m. EST | Sh'Nia Gordon 34' | Report | 39' Alina Ortega-Jurado; 43' Elizabeth Ball; 55' Frannie Crouse | Stadium: Dick Dlesk Soccer Stadium; Attendance: 419; Referee: Charles Murphy; Assistant referees: Amadou Diop; Michael Donovan; Fourth official: Jamie Duling |

===== Quarterfinal =====
| November 24, 2017 | #1 Stanford | 4–0 | #10 Penn State | Stanford, California |
| 2:00 p.m. PST | Catarina Macario 2'; Andi Sullivan 11'; Jaye Boissiere 12'; Kyra Carusa 25' | Report | | Stadium: Laird Q. Cagan Stadium; Attendance: 2,147; Referee: Ian Anderson; Assistant referees: Salma Perez; Chris Elliott; Fourth official: Joseph Dickerson |

Rankings from United Soccer Coaches Final Regular Season Rankings

=== South Carolina Bracket ===
First round November 10–11; Campus Sites
2 | UCF* | 0
Washington State | 1
Murray State | 0
Tennessee* | 2
South Florida* | 3
Florida Gulf Coast | 0
South Alabama | 1
3 | Florida* | 3
4 | Ohio State* | 1
Vanderbilt | 2
Santa Clara | 2
California* | 1
Wisconsin* | 5
Toledo | 0
Alabama State | 0
1 | South Carolina* | 3

Second round November 17; Regional Campus Sites
Washington State | 2 (3)
Tennessee | 2 (1)
South Florida | 0
3 | Florida* | 1
Vanderbilt | 1
Santa Clara | 3
Wisconsin | 0
1 | South Carolina* | 1

Round of 16; November 19; Regional Campus Sites
Washington State | 0
3 | Florida* | 1^{2OT}
Santa Clara | 0
1 | South Carolina* | 1

Quarterfinal; November 24; Campus Sites
3 | Florida | 0
1 | South Carolina* | 2

* Host institution

==== Schedule ====
===== First round =====
| November 10, 2017 | #16 Florida | 3–1 | South Alabama | Gainesville, Florida |
| 6:00 p.m. EST | Madison Alexander 34'; Melanie Monteagudo 44'; Sarah Troccoli 55' | Report | 85' Audrey Duren | Stadium: Donald R. Dizney Stadium; Attendance: 841; Referee: Guido Gonzales; Assistant referees: Trent Vanhaitsma; David Mon; Fourth official: Lance Vanhaitsma |

| November 10, 2017 | #14 Ohio State | 1–2 | Vanderbilt | Columbus, Ohio |
| 6:00 p.m. EST | Sarah Roberts 30' | Report | 62' Nia Dorsey; 89' Stephanie Amack | Stadium: Jesse Owens Memorial Stadium; Attendance: 331; Referee: Aaron Hernandez; Assistant referees: Justin Tatsak; Peter Charpentier; Fourth official: Daniel Bava |

| November 10, 2017 | #5 South Carolina | 3–0 | Alabama State | Columbia, South Carolina |
| 6:00 p.m. EST | Ryan Gareis 3'; Bianca Galassini 22'; Elexa Bahr 50' | Report | | Stadium: Stone Stadium; Referee: Dustin Thorn; Assistant referees: Rick Rogers; Justin Howard; Fourth official: Wayne Pavlischek |

| November 10, 2017 | Wisconsin | 5–0 | Toledo | Madison, Wisconsin |
| 7:00 p.m. CST | Grace Douglas 55', 59'; Lauren Rice 61'; Jordan McNeese 65'; Allie Winterfield 74' | Report | | Stadium: McClimon Track/Soccer Complex; Referee: Landis Wiley; Assistant referees: Besnik Rexhepi; Tom McCulloh; Fourth official: Nicolas Ramos |

| November 11, 2017 | #25 South Florida | 3–0 | Florida Gulf Coast | Tampa, Florida |
| 1:00 p.m. EST | Evelyne Viens 18'; Leah Ferlin 79'; Aubrey Megrath 83' | Report | | Stadium: Corbett Soccer Stadium; Attendance: 1,023; Referee: Daniel Gutierrez; Assistant referees: Tim Bower; Randy Cook; Fourth official: Anthony Chihocky |

| November 11, 2017 | #19 California | 1–2 | Santa Clara | Berkeley, California |
| 1:30 p.m. PST | Indigo Gibson (red card) 3'; Miranda Nild 27' (pen.) | Report | 3' Guðrún Arnardóttir; 65' Kelsey Turnbow | Stadium: Edwards Stadium; Attendance: 995; Referee: Turan Ozdemir; Assistant referees: Troy Thiele; Francisco Avalos; Fourth official: Alex Del Angel |

| November 11, 2017 | #20 Tennessee | 2–0 | Murray State | Knoxville, Tennessee |
| 5:00 p.m. EST | Danielle Marcano 60'; Erin Gilroy 64' | Report | | Stadium: Regal Soccer Stadium; Attendance: 861; Referee: Leland Grant; Assistant referees: Brooke Mayo; Josh Nobles; Fourth official: Paul Friend |

| November 11, 2017 | #8 UCF | 0–1 | Washington State | Orlando, Florida |
| 7:00 p.m. EST | | Report | 5' (o.g.) Saga Fredriksson | Stadium: UCF Soccer and Track Stadium; Referee: Esteban Rosano; Assistant referees: Ian Anderson; Anya Voigt; Fourth official: Sam Gillispie |

===== Second round =====
| November 17, 2017 | #20 Tennessee | 2–2 (a.e.t.) (1–3 p) | Washington State | Gainesville, Florida |
| 2:00 p.m. EST | Danielle Marcano 20', 30' | Report | 13' Morgan Weaver; 79' Kelsee Crenshaw | Stadium: Donald R. Dizney Stadium; Referee: Rubiel Vazquez; Assistant referees: Danny Thornberry; Hassan Belmnahia; Fourth official: Nardi Abeshi |
| | Penalties |
| | Katie Cousins (penalty scored); Mary Alice Vignola (penalty missed); Erin Gilroy (penalty missed); Meghan Flynn (penalty missed) | | (penalty scored) Maegan O'Neill; (penalty scored) Sofia Anker-Kofoed; (penalty scored) Jordan Branch |

| November 17, 2017 | Santa Clara | 3–1 | Vanderbilt | Columbia, South Carolina |
| 3:00 p.m. EST | Maddy Gonzalez 18', 36'; Maria Sánchez 48' | Report | 35' Madison Elwell | Stadium: Stone Stadium; Referee: Kevin Broadley; Assistant referees: Rick Rogers; Doug Hartemann; Fourth official: Howard Ash |

| November 17, 2017 | #16 Florida | 1–0 | #25 South Florida | Gainesville, Florida |
| 6:00 p.m. EST | Mayra Pelayo 42' | Report | | Stadium: Donald R. Dizney Stadium; Attendance: 1,142; Referee: Timothy Debysingh; Assistant referees: Abdel Kuttaineh; Natalie Simon; Fourth official: Martin Bel |

| November 17, 2017 | #5 South Carolina | 1–0 | Wisconsin | Columbia, South Carolina |
| 6:00 p.m. EST | Luciana Zullo 39' | Report | | Stadium: Stone Stadium; Referee: Eric Usher; Assistant referees: Abbas Piran; Daniel Burak; Fourth official: Derek Allison |

===== Round of 16 =====
| November 19, 2017 | #16 Florida | 1–0 (a.e.t.) | Washington State | Gainesville, Florida |
| 2:00 p.m. EST | Deanne Rose 104' | Report | | Stadium: Pressly Stadium; Attendance: 758; Referee: Jonathan Weiner; Assistant referees: Jose Da Silva; Eric Proctor; Fourth official: Abdel Kuttaineh |

| November 19, 2017 | #5 South Carolina | 1–0 | Santa Clara | Columbia, South Carolina |
| 2:00 p.m. EST | Savannah McCaskill 4' | Report | | Stadium: Stone Stadium; Referee: Brandon Marion; Assistant referees: Kyle Johnston; Robert Dail; Fourth official: Dallas Rosier |

===== Quarterfinal =====
| November 24, 2017 | #5 South Carolina | 2–0 | #16 Florida | Columbia, South Carolina |
| 6:00 p.m. EST | Grace Fisk 13'; Lindsey Lane 77' | Report | | Stadium: Stone Stadium; Referee: Amber O'Connor; Assistant referees: Matt Jackson; Jeremy Smith; Fourth official: Aleksander Zhelyazkov |

Rankings from United Soccer Coaches Final Regular Season Rankings

=== Duke Bracket ===
First round November 10–11; Campus Sites
1 | Duke* | 1
UNC Greensboro | 0
Missouri State | 1 (2)
Oklahoma State* | 1 (3)
Clemson* | 2
Alabama | 1
North Texas | 0
4 | Texas* | 3
3 | USC* | 2^{2OT}
Eastern Washington | 1
Rice | 2
Baylor* | 3
Notre Dame* | 5
IUPUI | 0
Lamar | 0
2 | Texas A&M* | 1

Second round November 17; Regional Campus Sites
1 | Duke* | 7
Oklahoma State | 0
Clemson | 1 (5)
4 | Texas | 1 (6)
3 | USC | 1 (0)
Baylor | 1 (3)
Notre Dame | 2 (4)
2 | Texas A&M* | 2 (1)

Round of 16; November 19; Regional Campus Sites
1 | Duke* | 3
4 | Texas | 0
Baylor | 3^{OT}
Notre Dame | 2

Quarterfinal; November 24; Campus Sites
1 | Duke* | 4
Baylor | 0

* Host institution

==== Schedule ====
===== First round =====
| November 10, 2017 | #18 Texas | 3–0 | North Texas | Austin, Texas |
| 5:00 p.m. CST | Cyera Hintzen 20', 68'; Haley Berg 29' | Report | | Stadium: Mike A. Myers Stadium; Attendance: 1,276; Referee: Timothy Debysingh; Assistant referees: Chris Gordon; Gregorio Garza; Fourth official: Jason Coody |

| November 10, 2017 | #23 Baylor | 3–2 | Rice | Waco, Texas |
| 5:00 p.m. CST | Precious Akanyirige 25'; De Lima 26'; Raegan Padgett 74' | Report | 17' Aliza Wolfe; 56' Erin Mikeska | Stadium: Betty Lou Mays Field; Attendance: 921; Referee: Mike Lavergne; Assistant referees: L Hodgkinson; Matt Breland; Fourth official: Melvin Machayo |

| November 10, 2017 | Clemson | 2–1 | Alabama | Clemson, South Carolina |
| 7:00 p.m. EST | Speckmaier 73'; Dani Antieau 78' | Report | 68' Casey Wertz | Stadium: Historic Riggs Field; Attendance: 358; Referee: Kevin Broadley; Assistant referees: Brian Bozard; Jason Kent; Fourth official: Clive Edwards |

| November 10, 2017 | #6 Texas A&M | 1–0 | Lamar | College Station, Texas |
| 7:30 p.m. CST | Tori Alaniz 8' (o.g.) | Report | | Stadium: Ellis Field; Attendance: 1,879; Referee: Travis Haight; Assistant referees: Victor Perez; Christina Hutchinson; Fourth official: George Kubove |

| November 11, 2017 | #17 Oklahoma State | 1–1 (a.e.t.) (3–2 p) | Missouri State | Stillwater, Oklahoma |
| 12:00 p.m. CST | Julia Lenhardt 9' | Report | 87' (o.g.) Michela Ongaro | Stadium: Cowgirl Soccer Complex; Attendance: 633; Referee: Leszek Stalmach; Assistant referees: Michael Cap; Matt Trotter; Fourth official: Roy Robinson |
| | Penalties |
| | Anna Beffer (penalty scored); Elise Hawn (penalty scored); Coumba Sow (penalty missed); Julia Lenhardt (penalty scored); Jaci Jones (penalty missed) | | (penalty scored) Ashley Coonfield; (penalty scored) Brooke Zimmerman; (penalty missed) Mary Disidore; (penalty missed) Jacqueline Baetz; (penalty missed) Brooke Prondzinski |

| November 11, 2017 | #9 USC | 2–1 (a.e.t.) | Eastern Washington | Los Angeles, California |
| 12:00 p.m. PST | Alex Anthony 51'; Erika Okuma 101' | Report | 6' Chloe Williams | Stadium: McAlister Field; Attendance: 340; Referee: Ceciah Valero; Assistant referees: Kyle Kazmer; TJ McCree; Fourth official: Loren Barnett |

| November 11, 2017 | Notre Dame | 5–0 | IUPUI | Notre Dame, Indiana |
| 6:00 p.m. EST | Natalie Jacobs 18'; Sandra Yu 36'; Ginny McGowan 47'; Erin Ospeck 79'; Katie Uhler 86' (pen.) | Report | | Stadium: Alumni Stadium; Referee: Heber Estrada; Assistant referees: Maggie Short; Arlind Kociu; Fourth official: Abdu Bensalah |

| November 11, 2017 | #3 Duke | 1–0 | UNC Greensboro | Durham, North Carolina |
| 7:00 p.m. EST | Imani Dorsey 69' | Report | | Stadium: Koskinen Stadium; Attendance: 499 |

===== Second round =====
| November 17, 2017 | #9 USC | 1–1 (a.e.t.) (0–3 p) | #23 Baylor | College Station, Texas |
| 3:30 p.m. CST | Leah Pruitt 72' | Report | 90' Sarah King | Stadium: Ellis Field; Referee: Travis Haight; Assistant referees: Ramon Bermudez, Jr. Ricardo Hernandez; Fourth official: John Navarro |
| | Penalties |
| | Tara McKeown (penalty missed); Savannah DeMelo (penalty missed); Amanda Rooney (penalty missed) | | (penalty scored) Caitlin Schwartz; (penalty missed) Julie James; (penalty scored) Delanie Davis; (penalty scored) Sarah King |

| November 17, 2017 | #18 Texas | 1–1 (a.e.t.) (6–5 p) | Clemson | Durham, North Carolina |
| 5:00 p.m. EST | Cyera Hintzen 61' | Report | 87' Patrice DiPasquale | Stadium: Koskinen Stadium; Referee: Mark Kadlecik; Assistant referees: Bill Dittmar; Jeremy L.B. Smith; Fourth official: Carmen Serbio |
| | Penalties |
| | Atu Mshana (penalty scored); Katie Glenn (penalty scored); Cyera Hintzen (penalty missed); Haley Berg (penalty scored); Chelsea Surpris (penalty scored); Emma Jett (penalty scored); Paige Hooper (penalty scored) | | (penalty scored) Dani Antieau; (penalty missed) Sandy MacIver; (penalty scored) Jenna Polonsky; (penalty scored) Patrice DiPasquale; (penalty scored) Mackenzie Smith; (penalty scored) Shannon Horgan; (penalty missed) Sam Staab |

| November 17, 2017 | #3 Duke | 7–0 | #17 Oklahoma State | Durham, North Carolina |
| 7:30 p.m. EST | Taylor Racioppi 10'; Kayla McCoy 25'; Quinn 29'; Karlie Paschall 35', 66'; Imani Dorsey 36'; Anna Munro 74' | Report | | Stadium: Koskinen Stadium; Attendance: 812; Referee: Charles Murphy; Assistant referees: Jude Carr; Benjamin Wooten; Fourth official: Aaron Riley |

| November 17, 2017 | #6 Texas A&M | 2–2 (a.e.t.) (1–4 p) | Notre Dame | College Station, Texas |
| 7:30 p.m. CST | Mikaela Harvey 36'; Emily Bates 88' | Report | 43' Eva Hurm; 83' (pen.) Natalie Jacobs | Stadium: Ellis Field; Attendance: 2,582; Referee: Kyle Phillips; Assistant referees: Chris Gordon; Jennifer Garner; Fourth official: Asa Adair |
| | Penalties |
| | Ally Watt (penalty scored); Emily Bates (penalty missed); Brittany Crabtree (penalty missed) | | (penalty scored) Natalie Jacobs; (penalty scored) Taylor Klawunder; (penalty scored) Jennifer Westendorf; (penalty scored) Ginny McGowan |

===== Round of 16 =====
| November 19, 2017 | #3 Duke | 3–0 | #18 Texas | Durham, North Carolina |
| 1:00 p.m. EST | Imani Dorsey 3'; Kayla McCoy 31'; Taylor Racioppi 65' | Report | | Stadium: Koskinen Stadium; Attendance: 683; Referee: Karl Kummer; Assistant referees: Danny Thornberry; Rick Rogers; Fourth official: Clive Edwards |

| November 19, 2017 | #23 Baylor | 3–2 (a.e.t.) | Notre Dame | College Station, Texas |
| 6:00 p.m. CST | Lauren Piercy 42'; Kennedy Brown 47'; Precious Akanyirige 97' | Report | 54' Taylor Klawunder; 58' Jennifer Westendorf | Stadium: Ellis Field; Attendance: 1,596; Referee: Mike Lavergne; Assistant referees: Gregorio Garza; Janae Thompson; Fourth official: Leszek Stalmach |

===== Quarterfinal =====
| November 24, 2017 | #3 Duke | 4–0 | #23 Baylor | Durham, North Carolina |
| 5:00 p.m. EST | Kayla McCoy 6'; Ella Stevens 47'; Imani Dorsey 48'; Tess Boade 87' | Report | (red card) 40' Lauren Piercy | Stadium: Koskinen Stadium; Attendance: 995; Referee: Mark Kadlecik; Assistant referees: Robert Velbis; Eric Barnes; Fourth official: Abbas Piran |

Rankings from United Soccer Coaches Final Regular Season Rankings

=== North Carolina Bracket ===
First round November 10–12; Campus Sites
2 | UCLA* | 3
San Diego State | 1
Butler | 0 (2)
Northwestern* | 0 (3)
Pepperdine* | 1
Cal State Fullerton | 0
Saint Francis (PA) | 0
3 | Virginia* | 2
4 | Princeton* | 4
Monmouth | 0
Arkansas | 1
NC State* | 4
Colorado* | 2
Denver | 1
High Point | 0
1 | North Carolina* | 3

Second round November 17; Regional Campus Sites
2 | UCLA* | 1^{OT}
Northwestern | 0
Pepperdine | 0
3 | Virginia | 3
4 | Princeton | 1 (5)
NC State | 1 (4)
Colorado | 0
1 | North Carolina* | 1

Round of 16; November 19; Regional Campus Sites
2 | UCLA* | 2
3 | Virginia | 1
4 | Princeton | 2^{OT}
1 | North Carolina* | 1

Quarterfinal; November 25; Campus Sites
2 | UCLA* | 3
4 | Princeton | 1

* Host institution

==== Schedule ====
===== First round =====
| November 10, 2017 | #13 Princeton | 4–0 | Monmouth | Princeton, New Jersey |
| 7:00 p.m. EST | Mimi Asom 6', 66'; Abby Givens 21'; Carolyne Davidson 71' | Report | | Stadium: Roberts Stadium; Attendance: 798; Referee: Zachary Rubinich; Assistant referees: Jason Blight; Luis Arroyo; Fourth official: Randal Von Steuben |

| November 10, 2017 | #4 UCLA | 3–1 | San Diego State | Los Angeles, California |
| 7:00 p.m. PST | Anika Rodríguez 16'; Julia Hernandez 54'; MacKenzie Cerda 85' | Report | 63' Mia Root | Stadium: Drake Stadium; Attendance: 1,032; Referee: Christopher Calderon; Assistant referees: Kristin Patterson; Loren Barnett; Fourth official: Ceciah Valero |

| November 11, 2017 | #21 NC State | 4–1 | Arkansas | Raleigh, North Carolina |
| 1:00 p.m. EST | Tziarra King 6', 50'; Paige Griffiths 63'; Kia Ranking 78' | | 81' Stefani Doyle | Stadium: Dail Soccer Field; Attendance: 428; Referee: Brandon Marion; Assistant referees: Benjamin Wooten; Robert Velbis; Fourth official: Raymond Thomas |

| November 11, 2017 | #2 North Carolina | 3–0 | High Point | Cary, North Carolina |
| 1:00 p.m. EST | Abby Elinsky 6'; Julia Ashley 39'; Morgan Goff 69' | Report | | Stadium: WakeMed Soccer Park; Attendance: 998; Referee: Eric Barnes; Assistant referees: Ben Jackson III; Rick Rogers; Fourth official: Chris Zuerner |

| November 11, 2017 | #11 Pepperdine | 1–0 | Cal State Fullerton | Malibu, California |
| 1:00 p.m. PST | Bri Visalli 87' | Report | | Stadium: Rokus Field; Attendance: 619; Referee: Omeed Azadpour; Assistant referees: Wale Animishaun; William Delgado; Fourth official: Magic Berenji |

| November 11, 2017 | #12 Virginia | 2–0 | Saint Francis (PA) | Charlottesville, Virginia |
| 7:00 p.m. EST | Veronica Latsko 23'; Taryn Torres 56' | Report | | Stadium: Klöckner Stadium; Attendance: 371; Referee: Jeffrey Skinner; Assistant referees: J.T. Alukonis; Jim Sadowski; Fourth official: Michael Donovan |

| November 12, 2017 | Northwestern | 0–0 (a.e.t.) (3–2 p) | Butler | Evanston, Illinois |
| 1:00 p.m. CST | | Report | | Stadium: Lakeside Field; Attendance: 277; Referee: Nick Balcer; Assistant referees: Duncan Purvis; Zachary Richter; Fourth official: George Ghawi |
| | Penalties |
| | Brenna Lovera (penalty scored); Kylie Fisher (penalty scored); Mikayla Hampton (penalty missed); Hannah Davison (penalty scored) | | (penalty scored) Halle Stelbasky; (penalty scored) Brenna Pawelkowski; (penalty missed) Elena Gutlove; (penalty missed) Paige Monaghan; (penalty missed) Caitlyn Disarcina |

| November 12, 2017 | Colorado | 2–1 | Denver | Boulder, Colorado |
| 12:00 p.m. MST | Megan Massey 50'; Taylor Kornieck 52' | Report | 38' Leah Swander | Stadium: Prentup Field; Attendance: 1,342; Referee: Matt Grove; Assistant referees: Jacob Herold; Lauren Parliament; Fourth official: Conor McGahey |

===== Second round =====
| November 17, 2017 | #13 Princeton | 1–1 (a.e.t.) (5–4 p) | #21 NC State | Cary, North Carolina |
| 2:30 p.m. EST | Carolyne Davidson 66' | Report | 82' Tziarra King | Stadium: WakeMed Soccer Park; Attendance: 530; Referee: Mark Buda; Assistant referees: Kevin Uitto; Hudson Owens; Fourth official: Robert Dail |
| | Penalties |
| | Mimi Asom (penalty missed); Courtney O'Brien (penalty scored); Vanessa Gregoire (penalty scored); Emily Hilliard-Arce (penalty scored); Tomi Kennedy (penalty scored); Mikaela Symanovich (penalty missed); Carolyne Davidson (penalty scored) | | (penalty scored) Taylor Porter; (penalty scored) Tziarra King; (penalty scored) Hannah Keogh; (penalty scored) Ricarda Walkling; (penalty missed) Kristina Schuster; (penalty missed) Lulu Guttenberger; (penalty missed) Dakota Stephens |

| November 17, 2017 | #2 North Carolina | 1–0 | Colorado | Cary, North Carolina |
| 5:00 p.m. EST | Bridgette Andrzejewski 26' | Report | | Stadium: WakeMed Soccer Park; Attendance: 980; Referee: Jeff Skinker; Assistant referees: Kai Goodrich; Jim Sadowski; Fourth official: Justin Howard |

| November 17, 2017 | #12 Virginia | 3–0 | #11 Pepperdine | Los Angeles, California |
| 5:00 p.m. PST | Veronica Latsko 7'; Betsy Brandon 66'; Ayan Adu 88' | Report | | Stadium: Drake Stadium; Referee: Randy Hoffman; Assistant referees: Kristin Patterson; Trevor Rappleye; Fourth official: Wale Animashaun |

| November 17, 2017 | #4 UCLA | 1–0 (a.e.t.) | Northwestern | Los Angeles, California |
| 8:00 p.m. PST | Anika Rodríguez 93' | Report | | Stadium: Drake Stadium; Attendance: 2,054; Referee: Daniel Radford; Assistant referees: Wale Animashaun; Salma Perez; Fourth official: Kristin Patterson |

===== Round of 16 =====
| November 19, 2017 | #2 North Carolina | 1–2 (a.e.t.) | #13 Princeton | Cary, North Carolina |
| 1:00 p.m. EST | Bridgette Andrzejewski 25' | Report | 4' Mimi Asom; 99' Abby Givens | Stadium: WakeMed Soccer Park; Attendance: 1,100; Referee: Lance Vanhaitsma; Assistant referees: Benjamin Wooten; Jude Carr; Fourth official: Michael Hill |

| November 19, 2017 | #4 UCLA | 2–1 | #12 Virginia | Los Angeles, California |
| 6:00 p.m. PST | Jessie Fleming 6' (pen.); Anika Rodriguez 89' | Report | 6' (o.g.) Unknown; (red card) 85' Courtney Petersen | Stadium: Drake Stadium; Referee: Joseph Dickerson; Assistant referees: Loren Barnett; Ceciah Valero; Fourth official: Daniel Radford |

===== Quarterfinal =====
| November 25, 2017 | #4 UCLA | 3–1 | #13 Princeton | Los Angeles, California |
| 5:30 p.m. PST | Hailie Mace 16', 61'; Olivia Athens 18' | Report | 55' Abby Givens | Stadium: Drake Stadium; Attendance: 2,913; Referee: Michael Zapata; Assistant referees: Kristin Patterson; Salma Perez; Fourth official: Christopher Calderon |

Rankings from United Soccer Coaches Final Regular Season Rankings

=== College Cup ===
Semifinals; December 1 Orlando City Stadium; Orlando, Florida
1 | Stanford | 2
5 | South Carolina | 0
3 | Duke | 0 (3)
4 | UCLA | 0 (4)

Final; December 3 Orlando City Stadium; Orlando, Florida
1 | Stanford | 3
4 | UCLA | 2

==== Schedule ====
===== Semifinals =====
| December 1, 2017 | #1 Stanford | 2–0 | #5 South Carolina | Orlando, Florida |
| 5:00 p.m. EST | Jordan DiBiasi 10', 26' | Report | | Stadium: Orlando City Stadium; Referee: Katja Koroleva; Assistant referees: Deleana Quan; Benjamin Hall-Volpenhein; Fourth official: Lance Vanhaitsma |

| December 1, 2017 | #3 Duke | 0–0 (3–4 p) | #4 UCLA | Orlando, Florida |
| 7:30 p.m. EST | | Report | | Stadium: Orlando City Stadium; Referee: Jonathan Weiner; Assistant referees: Jennifer Garner; Natalie Simon; Fourth official: Lance Vanhaitsma |
| | Penalties |
| | Gabi Brummett (penalty scored); Malinda Allen (penalty missed); Karlie Paschall (penalty scored); Ashton Miller (penalty scored); Kat McDonald (penalty missed) | | (penalty scored) Zoey Goralski; (penalty scored) Julia Hernandez; (penalty missed) MacKenzie Cerda; (penalty scored) Sunny Dunphy; (penalty scored) Marley Canales |

===== Final =====
| December 3, 2017 | #1 Stanford | 3–2 | #4 UCLA | Orlando, Florida |
| 12:00 p.m. EST | Kyra Carusa 15'; Andi Sullivan 26'; Jaye Boissiere 67' | | 55' (pen.) Jessie Fleming; 59' Delanie Sheehan | Stadium: Orlando City Stadium; Referee: Corey Rockwell; Assistant referees: Deleana Quan; Benjamin Hall-Volpenhein; Fourth official: Katja Koroleva |

Rankings from United Soccer Coaches Final Regular Season Rankings

== Record by conference ==
| Conference | Bids | Record | Pct. | R32 | R16 | QF | SF | F | NC |
|---|---|---|---|---|---|---|---|---|---|
| Pac-12 | 7 | 14–5–3 | .725 | 6 | 3 | 2 | 2 | 2 | 1 |
| SEC | 9 | 11–7–2 | .600 | 6 | 2 | 2 | 1 | – | – |
| ACC | 8 | 13–5–5 | .674 | 8 | 5 | 1 | 1 | – | – |
| Big 12 | 5 | 4–5–4 | .462 | 4 | 3 | 1 | – | – | – |
| Big Ten | 5 | 5–4–2 | .545 | 4 | 1 | 1 | – | – | – |
| Ivy | 1 | 2–1–1 | .625 | 1 | 1 | 1 | – | – | – |
| WCC | 2 | 3–2–0 | .600 | 2 | 1 | – | – | – | – |
| American | 2 | 1–2–0 | .333 | 1 | – | – | – | – | – |
| Big East | 2 | 0–0–2 | .500 | – | – | – | – | – | – |
| C-USA | 2 | 0–2–0 | .000 | – | – | – | – | – | – |
| MVC | 1 | 0–0–1 | .500 | – | – | – | – | – | – |

- The R32, S16, E8, F4, CG, and NC columns indicate how many teams from each conference were in the Round of 32 (second round), Round of 16 (third round), Quarterfinals, Semifinals, Final, and National Champion, respectively.
- The following conferences received one bid and finished the tournament with a record of 0–1–0: AEC, A-10, ASUN, Big Sky, Big South, Big West, CAA, Horizon, MAAC, MAC, MW, NEC, OVC, Patriot, Southern, Southland, Summit, Sun Belt, SWAC, and WAC.

== See also ==
- NCAA Women's Soccer Championships (Division II, Division III)
- NCAA Men's Soccer Championships (Division I, Division II, Division III)
- 2017 NCAA Division I Men's Soccer Championship
