= Fredriksson =

Fredriksson is a Swedish surname. Notable people with the surname include:

- Börje Fredriksson (1937–1968), Swedish jazz tenor saxophonist
- Carl Henrik Fredriksson (born 1965), Swedish literary critic, columnist, essayist, and translator living in Vienna, Austria
- David Fredriksson (born 1985), Swedish ice hockey player
- Erik Algot Fredriksson (1885–1930), Swedish tug of war competitor who competed in the 1912 Summer Olympics
- Erik Fredriksson (born 1943), former Swedish football referee
- Gert Fredriksson (1919–2006), Swedish sprint canoeist who competed from 1942 to 1964
- Håkan Fredriksson (born 1970), Swedish producer and musician
- Kristian Fredrikson (1940–2005), New Zealand-born Australian stage and costume designer
- Marianne Fredriksson (1927–2007), Swedish author who worked and lived in Roslagen and Stockholm
- Marie Fredriksson (1958–2019), Swedish pop singer-songwriter and pianist, member of the pop duo Roxette
- Mathias Fredriksson (born 1973), Swedish cross country skier who has competed since 1993
- Otto Fredrikson (born 1981), Finnish football goalkeeper
- Saga Fredriksson (born 1994), Swedish footballer
- Stig Fredriksson (born 1956), former Swedish football defender
- Thobias Fredriksson (born 1975), Swedish cross-country skier who has competed since 2000

== See also ==
- Frederiksen
- Fredrickson
