= Søren Frederiksen =

Søren Frederiksen may refer to:

- Søren Frederiksen (footballer, born 1972), Danish football forward
- Søren Frederiksen (footballer, born 1989), Danish football winger

== See also ==
- Frederiksen (surname)
