= Fredrickson =

Fredrickson is a surname. Notable people with the name include:

- Barbara Fredrickson (born 1964), the Kenan Distinguished Professor of Psychology at the University of North Carolina at Chapel Hill
- Dennis Frederickson (born 1939), American politician and farmer, served in the Minnesota Senate
- Dennis C. Frederickson (1931–2017), American politician and businessman, served in the Minnesota House of Representatives
- Donald S. Fredrickson (1924–2002), American medical researcher, director of National Institutes of Health and Howard Hughes Medical Institute
- Frank Fredrickson (1895–1979), Canadian ice hockey centre
- George M. Fredrickson (1934–2008), the Edgar E. Robinson Professor of U.S. History at Stanford University from 1984 to 2002
- Jeremiah Fredrickson (born 1976/1977), American politician in Wisconsin
- Rob Fredrickson (born 1971), former American football linebacker
- Scott Fredrickson (born 1967), Major League Baseball right-handed pitcher
- Steve Fredrickson, founder and CEO of the company "PRA Group"
- Tyler Fredrickson (born 1981), American football placekicker in the National Football League

== See also ==
- Frederiksen
- Fredriksson
