= Norwegian Physical Society =

The Norwegian Physical Society (Norwegian: Norsk fysisk selskap) is a professional society in Norway for physicists. Formed in 1953, its purpose is to promote research, public understanding and cooperation within physics. Its magazine, first published in 1939, is Fra Fysikkens Verden.

The Chair of the society is Åshild Fredriksen. The society consists of six scientific sub-groups as well as the Norwegian Physics Teachers' Association, which have one member of the board each.
