= Génesis Pérez =

Costa Rican footballer (born 2005)

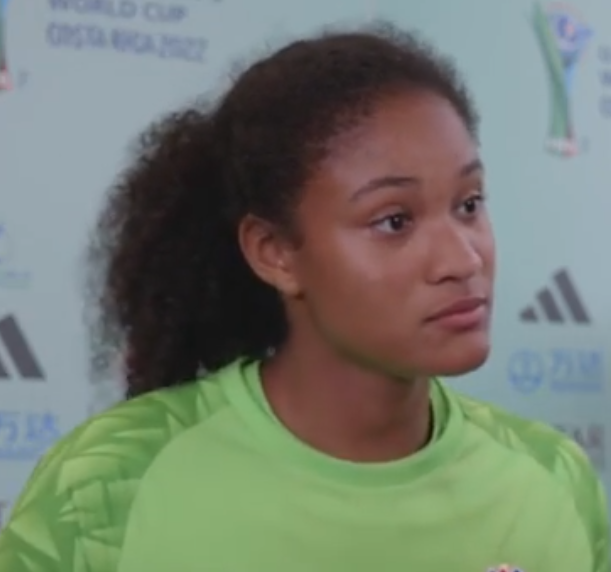
- In a 2022 interview

Personal information
- Full name: Génesis Gianna Pérez Watson
- Date of birth: 4 May 2005 (age 21)
- Place of birth: San José, Costa Rica
- Height: 1.75 m (5 ft 9 in)
- Position: Goalkeeper

Team information
- Current team: Atlético Madrid
- Number: 13

College career
Years	Team	Apps	(Gls)
2023–2026	UCF Knights	0	(0)

Senior career*
Years	Team	Apps	(Gls)
2026–	Atlético Madrid	0	(0)

International career^{‡}
2021–2022	Costa Rica U17	5	(0)
2022	Costa Rica U20	5	(0)
2021–	Costa Rica	8	(0)
- * Club domestic league appearances and goals ‡ National team caps and goals as of 00:45, 17 July 2022 (UTC)

Génesis Gianna Pérez Watson (born 4 May 2005) is a Costa Rican footballer who plays as a goalkeeper for Liga F club Atlético Madrid and the Costa Rica national team. She played college soccer for the UCF Knights.

== Club career ==
Coming from the Montverde Academy school team, Pérez joined Herediano in the summer of 2022. After half a year she returned to her school team and became active at college for the UCF Knights, in summer 2023.

On 5 July 2026, it was announced that Pérez had signed a two-year contract with Liga F club Atlético Madrid.

== International career ==
Pérez made her senior debut for Costa Rica on 15 June 2021, coming on as an 82nd-minute substitute for Noelia Bermúdez in a 4–1 friendly win over Guatemala. In 2022, she competed in the CONCACAF U-17 Championship. She was then back in the senior squad for the 2022 CONCACAF W Championship.

She then took part in the 2022 World Cup with the U20 squad and a year later in the 2023 CONCACAF Women's U-20 Championship.

In July 2023, Pérez was also added to the senior squad at the 2023 FIFA Women's World Cup.
