= Talia Gabarra =

American soccer player (born 2001)

Personal information
- Full name: Talia Lily Gabarra
- Date of birth: March 15, 2001 (age 25)
- Place of birth: Annapolis, Maryland, U.S.
- Height: 5 ft 7 in (1.70 m)
- Position: Midfielder

Team information
- Current team: Kansas City Current II

Youth career
- Maryland United
- Bethesda SC
- Washington Spirit

College career
| Years | Team | Apps | (Gls) |
| 2019–2023 | UCF Knights | 40 | (2) |

Senior career*
| Years | Team | Apps | (Gls) |
| 2025 | Linköping FC | 0 | (0) |
| 2025 | Bollstanäs SK | 14 | (1) |
| 2026 | Annapolis Blues | | |
| 2026– | Kansas City Current II | | |
- * Club domestic league appearances and goals as of 23:03, June 19, 2026 (UTC)

Talia Lily Gabarra (born March 15, 2001) is an American professional soccer player who plays as a midfielder for the Kansas City Current II. She played college soccer for the UCF Knights before being selected in the fourth round of the 2024 NWSL Draft by the Orlando Pride. She has previously played for Swedish clubs Linköping FC and Bollstanäs SK.

== Early life ==
Gabarra was born and raised in Annapolis, Maryland. She played club soccer for Maryland United FC and Bethesda SC before spending two years with the Washington Spirit's academy team. She attended Broadneck High School, where she played both varsity soccer and lacrosse. With the soccer team, Gabarra was once named All-State, twice All-Metro, and three times as team MVP. She also won one state championship with Broadneck in 2019. Gabarra's high school career ended on a negative note, as she missed her final year of soccer after sustaining a herniated disk and knee injury.

== College career ==
After spending 13 months in recovery, Gabarra took to the field with the UCF Knights for the first time on September 15, 2019. She made an immediate impact, recording her first college goal and assist in the 5–0 victory over Stetson. She played three games more in her freshman year to make a total of 4. Gabarra's sophomore season was pushed to the spring of 2021 due to the COVID-19 pandemic; once it rolled around, she made 1 start in 6 appearances.

In the fall of 2021, Gabarra played in all 16 of UCF's games, setting a career-high for herself. She seemed slated to have another promising campaign in 2022, but a serious injury in preseason sidelined her for the entirety of the year. Instead, she watched on as UCF made it to the second round of the NCAA tournament for the first time since 2014. In her fifth year of college, Gabarra made 11 consecutive starts to begin the season. She played in both of the Knights' Big 12 tournament matches as UCF were defeated in the semifinals by BYU.

== Club career ==
The Orlando Pride selected Gabarra as the last pick of the 2024 NWSL Draft (56th overall). With the NWSL Draft being abolished after 2024, she became the final draft pick in National Women's Soccer League history. Gabarra reported to the Pride's preseason training camp but did not make Orlando's final roster. She spent most of 2024 searching for a roster spot on another NWSL squad, but her efforts were ultimately fruitless.

On March 29, 2025, Gabarra signed her first professional contract with Swedish team Linköping FC. With Linköping in the thick of financial turmoil, the club's sports manager Mia Eriksson elected to forgo her own salary in order to accommodate for Gabarra's wages. Despite Eriksson's sacrifice, Gabarra did not earn any playing time for Linköping FC before departing from the club four months later.

Shortly thereafter, Gabarra moved down to the Elitettan, signing for second-tier side Bollstanäs SK. She made 14 league appearances for Bollstanäs in her lone season with the club. She also scored one goal, which came against Sunnanå SK in October 2025.

Gabarra then played for Annapolis Blues FC in the USL W League before winning the Women's Premier Soccer League (WPSL) championship with the Kansas City Current II reserve team.

== Personal life ==
Gabarra's parents both have strong ties to professional soccer. Her father, Jim Gabarra, is a former player and coach who has managed teams including Sky Blue FC and the Washington Spirit. Her mother, Carin Jennings-Gabarra, won gold at the 1996 Olympics with the United States women's national team. Gabarra's brother, Tyler Gabarra, played college soccer for the NC State Wolfpack before spending time with various professional teams.
