= Frederiksen =

Frederiksen is a Danish patronymic surname meaning "son of Frederik". The Norwegian counterpart is Fredriksen and the Swedish is Fredriksson.

== People ==
- Annette Frederiksen (1954–2022), Danish footballer
- Axel Frederiksen (1894–1951), Danish composer
- Christian Frederiksen (born 1965), Danish-born Norwegian sprint canoer
- Claus Hjort Frederiksen (born 1947), Danish Minister of Finance
- Dennis Frederiksen (1951–2014), American singer, the lead vocalist for Angel, Le Roux, and Toto
- Grete Frederiksen, Danish freestyle swimmer who competed in the 1936 Olympics
- Heather Frederiksen, British swimmer
- Helle Frederiksen, Danish triathlete
- Henrik Frederiksen (born 1943/44), Danish businessman and car collector
- Ib Frederiksen, Danish badminton player
- Ingeborg Frederiksen (1886–1976), Danish botanical illustrator
- Ivan Frederiksen, Danish curler
- Jan Frederiksen, Danish professional football defender
- John Frederiksen, Faroese footballer
- Johnny Frederiksen, Danish curler
- Karolína Frederiksen (née Pilařová, born 1981), Czech curler and curling coach
- Katti Frederiksen (born 1982), Greenlandic writer, poet, linguist and politician
- Kurt Frederiksen, Danish politician
- Lars Frederiksen, guitarist and vocalist for the punk rock band Rancid
- Marti Frederiksen, American musician, producer, and songwriter with Aerosmith
- Mette Frederiksen, Danish politician
- Niels Frederiksen, Danish football coach
- Sigrid Friis Frederiksen (born 1994), Danish politician
- Søren Frederiksen (footballer born 1972), Danish footballer
- Søren Frederiksen (footballer born 1989), Danish footballer
- Suka K. Frederiksen (1965–2020), Greenlandic politician

== Other ==
- Carl Fredricksen, fictional character from the animated movie Up
- Frederiksen Industries, an amusement ride manufacturer based in Tampa, Florida specializing in Fun Slides
- Lars Frederiksen and the Bastards (album), self-titled debut album by guitarist Lars Frederiksen

== See also ==
- Fredriksen
- Fredriksson
