= Jaye Boissiere =

American professional soccer player

Personal information
- Full name: Jaye Cori Locker Boissiere
- Date of birth: February 16, 1996 (age 30)
- Place of birth: Palo Alto, California, United States
- Height: 5 ft 2 in (1.57 m)
- Position: Midfielder

Youth career
- –2014: MVLA Lightning

College career
Years	Team	Apps	(Gls)
2014–2018	Stanford Cardinal	53	(10)

Senior career*
Years	Team	Apps	(Gls)
2019–2020	HAC Féminines		
2020	Washington Spirit	0	(0)

International career
- United States U18
2018	United States U23		
- * Club domestic league appearances and goals as of July 1, 2020

Jaye Cori Locker Boissiere (born February 16, 1996) is an American professional soccer player who played as a midfielder for National Women's Soccer League (NWSL) club Washington Spirit.

== Club career ==
=== Washington Spirit ===
Boissiere made her NWSL debut in the 2020 NWSL Challenge Cup on July 1, 2020.

== Honors ==
Stanford Cardinal

- NCAA Division I Women's Soccer Championship: 2017
