= Fredriksen =

Fredriksen is a Norwegian patronymic surname which may refer to:

== People ==
- Åshild Fredriksen, Norwegian physicist
- Aslaug Fredriksen (1918–2000), Norwegian politician
- Britt Fredriksen (born 1945), Norwegian Playmate
- Jan-Henrik Fredriksen (1956–2020), Norwegian politician
- John Fredriksen (born 1944), Norwegian oil tanker and shipping tycoon
- Jon André Fredriksen (born 1982), Norwegian footballer
- Kitty Petrine Fredriksen (1910–2003), Norwegian politician
- Lars A. Fredriksen, Norwegian pop singer
- Mark Fredriksen (1936–2011), French extreme political right figure in 1960s to the 2000s and founder of a movement
- Oskar Fredriksen (cross-country skier), Norwegian cross country skier
- Oskar Fredriksen (speed skater) (1872–1920), Norwegian speed skater
- Paula Fredriksen (born 1951), American scholar
- Sigurd Fredriksen, (1907–1986), French painter
- Trond Fredriksen (born 1977), Norwegian footballer
- Yngvar Fredriksen(1887–1958), Norwegian gymnast

== Other ==
- Carl Fredriksens Transport, code name for an operation during the occupation of Norway by Nazi Germany
- Fredriksen Island, South Orkney Islands, near Antarctica
