= Mimi Asom =

American soccer player

Personal information
- Full name: Mimi Omosefe Asom
- Date of birth: December 19, 1997 (age 28)
- Place of birth: Dallas, Texas, U.S.
- Position: Forward

College career
Years	Team	Apps	(Gls)
2015–2018	Princeton Tigers	72	(43)

Senior career*
Years	Team	Apps	(Gls)
2019	Arna-Bjørnar	12	(4)
2020	Benfica	2	(0)
- * Club domestic league appearances and goals as of February 16, 2020 ‡ National team caps and goals as of January 15, 2020

Mimi Omosefe Asom (born December 19, 1997) is an American soccer player who plays for as a forward.

== Career ==
=== Benfica ===
On January 14, 2020, she signed with Benfica along with fellow countrywoman Alana O'Neill. She made her debut on February 9, 2020 being subbed on in a 5–0 win over Estoril Praia on the round 14 of the 2019–20 Campeonato Nacional Feminino. She scored her first goal by scoring a poker against Amora for the 2019–20 Taça de Portugal Feminina quarterfinals.

== Honors ==
Benfica

- Taça da Liga: 2019–20
