= Åshild Fredriksen =

Norwegian plasma physicist

Åshild Rigmor Fredriksen is a Norwegian plasma physicist whose research has included the formation of double layers in plasma, the interactions of plasma with ion beams, and the instability of plasma under magnetic confinement. She is a professor emerita at The Arctic University of Norway in Tromsø, the former president of the Norwegian Physical Society, secretary general of Academia Borealis, The North-Norwegian Academy of Science and Letters, and a member of the Royal Norwegian Society of Sciences and Letters.

Fredriksen completed her Ph.D. in 1991 at The Arctic University of Norway. She remained there as a postdoctoral researcher from 1992 to 1994, as an associate professor from 1995 to 2003, and as a full professor since 2003.
