= UCF Knights women's soccer =

American college soccer team

- Founded: 1981; 45 years ago
- University: University of Central Florida
- Head coach: Tiffany Roberts Sahaydak (13th season)
- Conference: Big 12
- Location: Orlando, Florida, US
- Stadium: UCF Soccer and Track Stadium (capacity: 2,000)
- Nickname: UCF Knights
- Colors: Black and gold
Home	Away

NCAA tournament runner-up
- 1981 (AIAW), 1982

NCAA tournament College Cup
- 1981 (AIAW), 1982, 1987

NCAA tournament Quarterfinals
- 1981 (AIAW), 1982, 1984, 1987, 1988, 2011

NCAA tournament appearances
- 1981 (AIAW), 1982, 1984, 1987, 1988, 1991, 1998, 1999, 2001, 2002, 2003, 2004, 2007, 2008, 2009, 2010, 2011, 2012, 2013, 2014, 2015, 2017, 2022, 2025, 2026

Conference tournament championships
- 1994, 1995, 1996, 1998, 1999, 2001, 2002, 2003, 2012, 2013

Conference regular season championships
- 1993, 1999, 2001, 2002, 2003, 2005, 2007, 2009, 2010, 2013, 2014, 2017, 2022

The UCF Knights women's soccer program represents the University of Central Florida in National Collegiate Athletic Association (NCAA) Division I. The Knights compete in the Big 12 Conference. UCF plays home games on its main campus in Orlando, Florida at the UCF Soccer and Track Stadium. The Knights are led by head coach (World Cup Champion and Olympic gold medalist) Tiffany Roberts Sahaydak.

UCF has a storied history in women's soccer that includes 23 Conference Tournament or Regular Season Championships. The Knights have earned 24 AIAW and NCAA Tournament Appearances (2nd most in the state of Florida), which include 5 Elite Eight appearances, 2 Final Four appearances, an AIAW National Championship Game appearance (1981), and an NCAA National Championship Game appearance (1982). Twenty-three UCF players have earned various All-American honors, including three players who were honored as Consensus All-Americans (Mary Varas, Michelle Akers x4, Karen Ricther). Akers was also awarded the Hermann Trophy, and four other Knights players have been finalists or on the watch list for the award. Fourteen former UCF players have been selected for their respective countries' national teams, including four players selected to the U.S. Women's National Soccer Team. Two former UCF Players have won the FIFA Women's World Cup, and seven former Knights have appeared in FIFA Women's World Cup tournaments. Three former Knights have also played in the Olympics, with Michelle Akers winning Olympic Gold with the U.S. team in 1996 and Sarai Linder earning a Bronze Medal with the German team in 2024. Numerous former UCF players have also played for various professional soccer teams around the world, including the NWSL and several European professional leagues.

== History ==
=== The Jim Rudy Era ===
The UCF Knights Women's Soccer team first took the field in 1981 as an Independent, under the leadership of Jim Rudy. A Rollins College Men's Soccer alumnus, Rudy was the Coach of both the men's and women's side at UCF. He was known for his technical acumen as a coach, and his tactical wizardry in game planning. He was also one of the best coaches of goalkeepers at that time, with three of goalkeepers he coached going on to start for the U.S. Women's National Soccer Team. (Kim Wyant and Amy Allman at UCF; Briana Scurry at UMASS).

During his seven years as Coach, Rudy led UCF to five post-season appearances. This included two appearances in the Final Four of the NCAA Women's Soccer Tournament. In their first season of play, the Knights played in the AIAW Tournament (the women's national championship tournament before the NCAA recognized women's sports). UCF defeated Harvard in the Quarterfinal 2–0, then topped the University of Missouri-St. Louis in the Seminfinal 4–0, earning a berth in the AIAW Championship Game. In the final, UCF was defeated by the North Carolina Tar Heels 1–0.

In the 1982 NCAA Tournament, the Knights qualified for a first round bye, then defeated UMASS in the second round for a score of 2–1. In the semi-final game, played in Orlando, UCF defeated UCONN by a score of 3–1. The 1982 Championship Game was played on UCF's home field, but the Knights fell to the North Carolina Tar Heels by a score of 2–0. This would be the first of 22 NCAA Championships won by the Tar Heels, under the leadership of legendary Coach Anson Dorrance. The Knights dominated the individual players awards in the 1982 tournament, with UCF players earning the awards of Offensive Player of the Tournament (Mary Varas), Defensive Player of the Tournament (Linda Gancitano), and the tournament's Most Valuable Player (Goalkeeper Kim Wyant).

Rudy's overall record at UCF was 73–22–6. He also coached several UCF players to All-American honors. His best known and most accomplished player at UCF was the legendary Michelle Akers. Considered to be the best soccer player in UCF history (and one of UCF's best athletes of all time), Akers played for UCF from 1984 to 1988. During her career as a Knight, Akers scored 52 goals, 30 assists, and a team high of 134 points scored. In 1988, Akers was selected as the winner of the first Hermann Trophy (awarded to the best player in NCAA soccer for that season). Akers went on to a distinguished career with the U.S. Women's National Soccer Team, winning two Women's World Cups (1991, 1999) and an Olympic Gold Medal (1996). She was also selected by FIFA as one of the 100 Top Players in 20th Century Football (Soccer), one of only two women selected to that list (the other being Mia Hamm). Akers later returned to UCF as a Volunteer Assistant Coach.

After leading UCF to the final four of the NCAA Tournament once again in 1987, Rudy left UCF to become the Head Coach of at UMASS.

=== The Bill Barker Era ===
After Rudy's departure, UCF Assistant Soccer Coach Bill Barker took over both the UCF Men's and Women's Soccer programs. As an assistant coach under Rudy, Barker had helped to recruit and coach outstanding talent, and this continued under his leadership as Head Coach. He would lead the Knights from 1988 to 1992, earning an overall record of 50–18–9, and leading the Knights to two more NCAA tournament appearances. After his days as a coach were done, Barker would return to UCF to work as a Planning and Knowledge Management Coordinator for the UCF College of Medicine.

During his tenure, Barker coached two future UCF Hall of Fame players: Kelly Kochevar and Karen Richter. Kochevar would score 53 goals during her time at UCF, making her the top goal scorer in program history. She would also score a hat trick in five different matches as a Knight, earning all-regional honors and selection to the Soccer America Freshman All-American Team.

Karen Richter became one of the greatest goalkeepers in NCAA history, earning NCAA Goalkeeper of the Year honors in 1990. She was also a finalist for that year's Hermann Trophy. During her three years at UCF, she only allowed 30 goals to be scored, and secured 30 shutouts (both of which are UCF records). In her Junior year, she only allowed four goals in 14 games played.

=== The Karen Richter Era ===
After Bill Barker departed UCF for Georgia, former UCF player Karen Richter took over as head coach, and would lead the Knights from 1993 to 1998. She would also lead the Knights into their first conference, joining the Trans America Athletic Conference (later renamed the Atlantic Sun Conference) in 1993. Under Richter's leadership, the Knights would win four conference tournament championships and one regular season championship. She was named the TAAC Conference Coach of the Year in 1991, leading UCF to another NCAA tournament berth. Richter left UCF after the 1998 season to take over as the Head Coach at Auburn, and would go on to coach with U.S. Soccer's U16, U18, and U19 women's programs.

=== The Amanda Cromwell Era ===
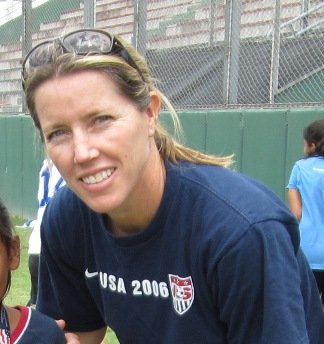
Amanda Cromwell

After Richter's departure, Amanda Cromwell took over the UCF Women's Soccer Program, and would lead the Knights for the next fourteen seasons (1999–2012). Cromwell had been a standout player at the University of Virginia, had played on various professional squads, and made fifty-five appearances as a player with the U.S. Women's National Soccer Team. She had also been an Assistant Coach at Virginia and the Head Coach at UMBC before taking over the helm of UCF's program.

During her tenure with UCF, Cromwell led the Knights to an overall record of 224–83–26, which places her record in the top-30 all time in NCAA history. She led UCF to 11 NCAA tournament appearances (including the 2011 Elite Eight of the that year's tournament), nine conference championships (five tournament, four regular season championships), and eleven appearances in the top-25 rankings. This included a top-ten ranking in 2012 (#6); UCF's highest ranking in the polls in nearly two decades. Cromwell also coached 96 players who earned all-conference honors, 38 players who earned all-region selections, and several players recognized with various all-American honors.

UCF moved into Conference-USA in 2005, where the Knights record of success continued. The height of that success came in 2011, when the Knights posted 13-5-6 record and made a run to the Elite Eight round of the NCAA tournament. During the regular season, the Knights scored five wins over ranked teams, knocked rival Florida out of the second round of the tournament, and defeated North Carolina in the Sweet Sixteen before falling to Wake Forest in the Elight Eight.

In Cromwell's final season with UCF (2012), UCF earned fifteen shutout victories (conference and school single-season records) and placed in the top-10 nationally in goals against average and shutout percentage. They were also ranked in the top-25 in scoring offense and won-lost-tied percentage. In what would also be UCF's final season in Conference-USA, UCF earned the conference tournament championship and their 17th NCAA tournament appearance (the latter being the most all-time amongst all of Florida's NCAA women's soccer teams). Cromwell left UCF to take over the UCLA women's soccer program.

=== The Tiffany Roberts Sahaydak Era ===
The 2013 season saw major changes in the UCF Women's Soccer Program. UCF moved into the American Athletic Conference, and for the first time in fourteen years, the Knight's women's soccer program had a new Head Coach. Tiffany Roberts Sahaydak took over the Knights after a successful playing career and a tenure as Head Coach at VCU. Sayhadak's playing career saw her take part in winning two NCAA National Championships (at North Carolina), a pro league championship with the WUSA's Carolina Courage, as well as a Women's World Cup Championship and two Olympic gold medals with the U.S. Women's National Soccer Team. Sahaydak was a "99er" (a member of the 1999 Women's World Cup Championship team), and has seen several stints as an Assistant Coach with the U.S. Women's Soccer Team. She was joined at UCF by her husband, former MLS Soccer Player Tim Sahaydak, as an Assistant Coach.

UCF's first two years in the American Athletic Conference saw the Knights win back-to-back conference titles, including an undefeated conference record in the 2013 season. The Knights also earned three straight NCAA tournament appearances, including an appearance in 2014's Sweet Sixteen round of the tournament. The 2016 season saw the Knights miss the NCAA tournament for the first time in ten seasons, but returned to success the following year with a conference title and a return to the NCAA tournament. UCF won the American conference title one more time in 2022 before transitioning to the Big 12 Conference for the 2023 season. Also in 2022, Coach Sahaydak spent a year as an assistant coach with the U.S. Women's National Soccer Team while retaining her position as UCF Head Coach.

In 2025, the Knights recorded their most successful season since joining the Big 12, going 12-4-5 overall (5-1-5 in conference play). This included a 9-game unbeaten streak in Big 12 play, and multiple wins against ranked opponents. Ten UCF players scored goals during the season, led by the duo of Liz Worden and Rajanah Reed who scored or assisted on 20 of the 30 goals UCF scored during the season. Goalkeeper Genesis Perez Watson ranked in the top-20 nationally in save percentage, as she allowed only 16 goals and posted eight clean sheets on the season. The Knights made their 23rd NCAA Tournament appearance, defeating Maine in the first round before falling to Duke in the second round of the tournament.

== Current squad ==
As of November 2026

Note: Flags indicate national team as defined under FIFA eligibility rules; some limited exceptions apply. Players may hold more than one non-FIFA nationality.

No.	Pos.	Nation	Player
0	GK	USA	Ansley Ittel
1	GK	FRA	Kaïna Cesar
2	DF	USA	Bella Douglas
3	DF	BRA	Guta Franke
4	DF	USA	Jessica McCullen
5	DF	USA	Natalie Leon
6	FW	USA	Naomi Clark
7	FW	SWE	Tyra Eriksen
8	MF	BRA	Gabi Berchon
9	MF	CRC	Daniela Ocampo
11	FW	USA	Alysiah Lockette
12	DF	USA	Jada Silvest
13	MF	USA	Maria Tregansin
14	DF	USA	Camryn Szotak

No.	Pos.	Nation	Player
16	MF	USA	Haley Cramer
17	MF	JPN	Momo Chogyoji
18	MF	USA	Ainsley Moy
19	FW	USA	Kalena Bellini
20	FW	USA	Payton Patrick
21	MF	USA	Sophia May
22	DF	USA	Brooke Mulroney
23	FW	NGR	Edidiong Etim
25	MF	USA	Ella Holloran
26	MF	PUR	Katsi Bengoa
28	DF	USA	Carli Crews
30	GK	USA	Virginia Green
31	GK	CAN	Brianne MacDonald

== Championships and AIAW/NCAA Tournaments ==
Conference Regular Season Championships
Year	Conference	Head Coach	Regular Season Conference Record
1993	Trans America Athletic Conference	Karen Richter	5-1-0
1999	Trans America Athletic Conference	Amanda Cromwell	8-0-1
2001	Atlantic Sun Conference	Amanda Cromwell	9-1-0
2002	Atlantic Sun Conference	Amanda Cromwell	10-1-0
2003	Atlantic Sun Conference	Amanda Cromwell	9-1-0
2005	Conference USA	Amanda Cromwell	8-1-0
2007	Conference USA	Amanda Cromwell	7-1-1
2009	Conference USA	Amanda Cromwell	10-1-0
2010	Conference USA	Amanda Cromwell	8-1-2
2013	American Athletic Conference	Tiffany Roberts Sahaydak	8-0-1
2014	American Athletic Conference	Tiffany Roberts Sahaydak	8-1-0
2017	American Athletic Conference	Tiffany Roberts Sahaydak	7-0-2
2022	American Athletic Conference	Tiffany Roberts Sahaydak	7-0-1

Conference Tournament Championships
Year	Conference	Head Coach	Tournament Championship Game
1994	Trans America Athletic Conference	Karen Richter	UCF 2, FIU 0
1995	Trans America Athletic Conference	Karen Richter	UCF 1, Campbell 0
1996	Trans America Athletic Conference	Karen Richter	UCF 1, FIU 0
1998	Trans America Athletic Conference	Karen Richter	UCF 1, Jacksonville 0
1999	Trans America Athletic Conference	Amanda Cromwell	UCF 4, Jacksonville 1
2001	Atlantic Sun Conference	Amanda Cromwell	UCF 2, Florida Atlantic 1
2002	Atlantic Sun Conference	Amanda Cromwell	UCF 3, Jacksonville 2
2003	Atlantic Sun Conference	Amanda Cromwell	UCF 4, Stetson 1
2012	Conference USA	Amanda Cromwell	UCF 2, Tulsa 0
2013	American Athletic Conference	Tiffany Roberts Sahaydak	UCF 1, SMU 0

AIAW/NCAA Tournaments
Year	Tournament	Head Coach	Notes
1981	AIAW Tournament	Jim Rudy	Tournament Runner-Up
1982	NCAA Tournament	Jim Rudy	Tournament Runner-Up
1984	NCAA Tournament	Jim Rudy	Second Round
1987	NCAA Tournament	Jim Rudy	Final Four (Semifinals)
1988	NCAA Tournament	Bill Barker	Second Round
1991	NCAA Tournament	Bill Barker	First Round
1998	NCAA Tournament	Karen Richter	First Round
1999	NCAA Tournament	Amanda Cromwell	Second Round
2001	NCAA Tournament	Amanda Cromwell	First Round
2002	NCAA Tournament	Amanda Cromwell	First Round
2003	NCAA Tournament	Amanda Cromwell	First Round
2004	NCAA Tournament	Amanda Cromwell	Second Round
2007	NCAA Tournament	Amanda Cromwell	Second Round
2008	NCAA Tournament	Amanda Cromwell	Second Round
2009	NCAA Tournament	Amanda Cromwell	Second Round
2010	NCAA Tournament	Amanda Cromwell	Second Round
2011	NCAA Tournament	Amanda Cromwell	Elite Eight (Quarterfinals)
2012	NCAA Tournament	Amanda Cromwell	Second Round
2013	NCAA Tournament	Tiffany Roberts Sahaydak	First Round
2014	NCAA Tournament	Tiffany Roberts Sahaydak	Sweet Sixteen
2015	NCAA Tournament	Tiffany Roberts Sahaydak	First Round
2017	NCAA Tournament	Tiffany Roberts Sahaydak	First Round
2022	NCAA Tournament	Tiffany Roberts Sahaydak	First Round
2025	NCAA Tournament	Tiffany Roberts Sahaydak	Second Round
2026	NCAA Tournament	Tiffany Roberts Sahaydak	First Round

== Rivalries ==
=== University of South Florida (the War on I-4) ===
The UCF Knights have had a long-time rivalry with the University of South Florida Bulls, whose campus is 90 miles from Orlando in Tampa. This rivalry, known as "the War on I-4" (named for the interstate highway that connects Orlando and Tampa), has encompassed all sports played by both schools, but it has been just as intense in women's soccer as it has in any other sport played by the two rival universities.

When UCF and South Florida were both members of the American Athletic Conference, both schools developed an all sports "War on I-4" trophy that would be awarded to one of the two schools on an annual basis based on their head-to-head record in all sports played that year.

Although the Bulls won the first matchup between the two schools in 1998 by a score of 4–0, the Knights dominated the rivalry for almost twenty years after that first meeting. Between 2001 and 2013, the Knights won eight games in a row against the Bulls. During their first matchup as members of the American Athletic Conference in 2013, the two teams played a 0–0 draw, but the Knights defeated the Bulls over the next two seasons’ matchups. South Florida finally defeated UCF for the first time in nearly two decades on November 5, 2015, knocking the Knights out of that year's American Athletic Conference Women's Soccer Tournament.

Between 2015 and 2022, the Bulls would win five of the next seven games against the Knights, and the two teams would play three draws against one another. These matchups would often determine conference tournament seedings and tournament advancement. When the Knights moved to the Big 12 Conference starting in the 2023 season, the two schools agreed to continue the rivalry by playing non-conference matchups each year in alternating annual games in Orlando and Tampa. Since then, the Knights have won two of the past three games, the latest being a 4–1 victory over the Bulls in Orlando during the 2025 season.

UCF's all-time record against South Florida: 14-7-4

=== University of Florida ===
UCF's rivalry with the Florida Gators goes back to the 1990s, when the two teams began playing each other in alternating home-and-away matchups in 1995. The Gators dominated the Knights in the early years in the rivalry, winning the first eight matchups between the two schools before UCF earned its first victory over Florida in 2005. The two teams play each other most years in non-conference regular season matchups and have met several times in the NCAA tournament.

In recent years, the Knights have turned the tables on the Gators, with UCF dominating the rivalry since 2018. Florida has not defeated UCF in ten years (since 2016), with the Knights going 6-0-1 against the Gators between 2018 and 2026. In 2025, the Knights took down the Gators on the latter's home field 1–0. In the opening game of the 2026 season, the Knights defeated the Gators in Orlando by a score of 4-3. These two latest matchups saw the lowest margin of victory for UCF over Florida during that ten-year span, with the Knights winning by a two to three goal margin in most of their other victories over the Gators during that period (with an overall goal differential of 17–6 in the Knights’ favor). All but one of UCF's victories over Florida during this period have been shutouts, with the Gators only scoring against the Knights in a 2–2 draw played in 2024 and the 4-3 loss to the Knights in 2026. Given geographic proximity and the passionate nature of the rivalry, the two schools will more than likely continue to play each other in most years going into the future.

UCF's all-time record against Florida: 9-14-2

== Stadium ==
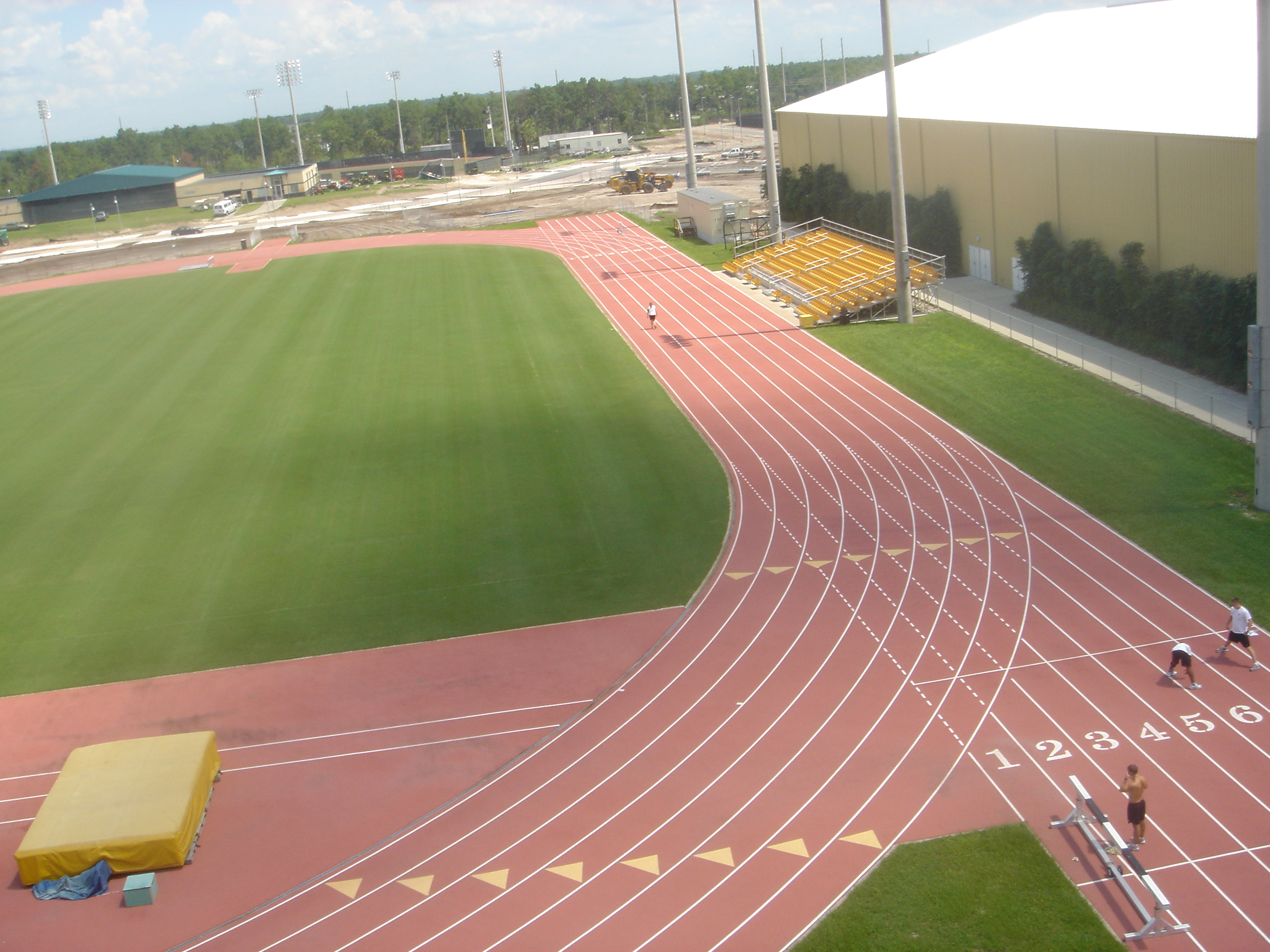
UCF Soccer and Track Stadium, home venue of UCF

The Knights play their home games at the UCF Soccer and Track Stadium, part of Knights Plaza, on the north end of UCF's main campus in Orlando, Florida. The soccer field is made of natural grass and measures 347 feet (106 m) x 200 feet (61 m).

In 2011, the stadium was heavily renovated, boasting a 2,000-seat capacity with a new 1,475-seat stand, press box, 7,500 square feet (700 m^{2}) clubhouse, restrooms and new entrance on the west side of the facility. The original 500-seat stand was retained as a visitors' stand.

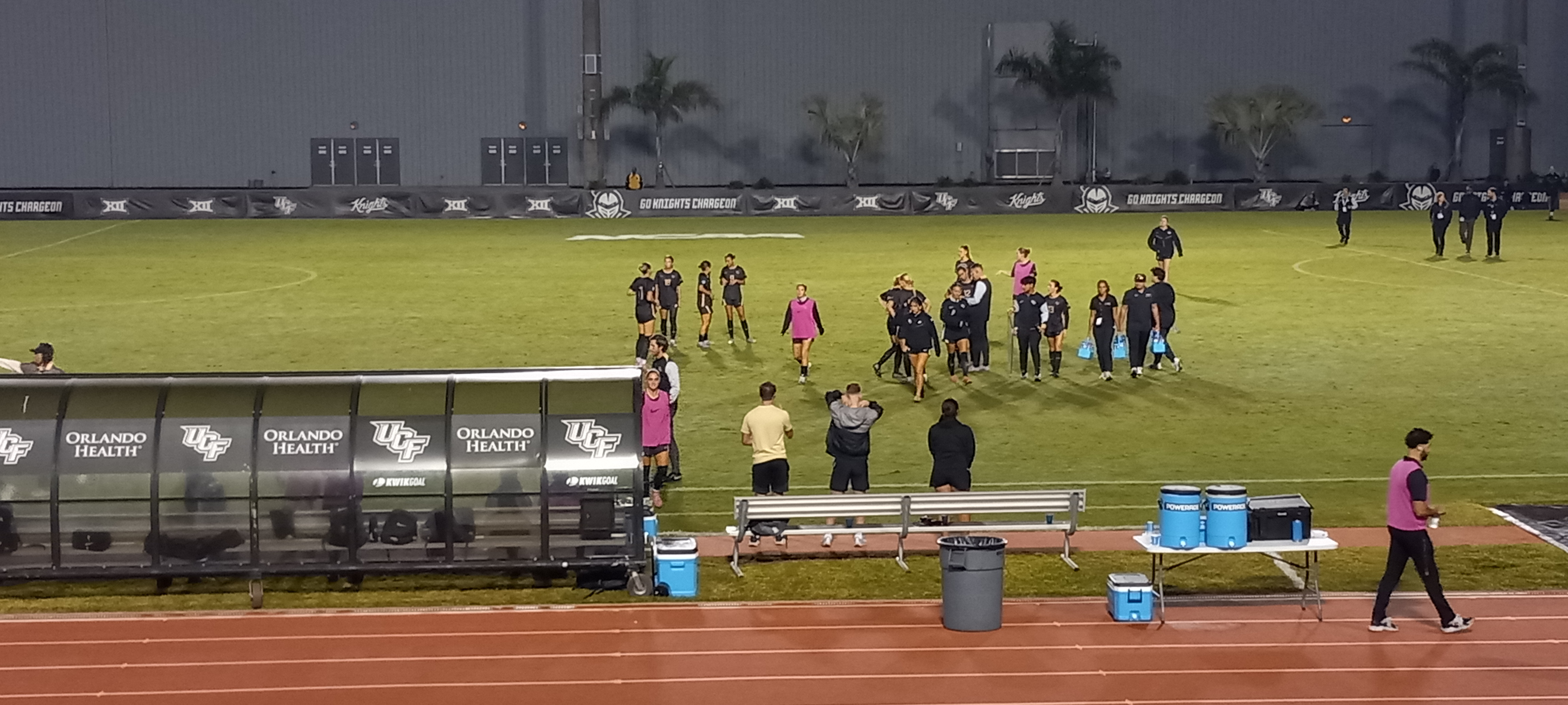
UCF's home field during an NCAA Tournament game against Maine, played on November 14, 2025.

== Coaches ==
Tenure	Coach	Seasons	Record	Pct.
1981–1987	Jim Rudy	7	72–23–6	.713
1988–1992	Bill Barker	5	50–18–9	.649
1993–1998	Karen Richter	6	64–44–9	.547
1999–2012	Amanda Cromwell	14	224–83–26	.706
2013–present	Tiffany Roberts Sahaydak	14	146–71–39	.646
Totals	5 coaches	45 seasons	556–239–89	.679
Records are through the conclusion of the 2025 season.

=== Coaching Honors ===
Karen Richter:

- 1998 Trans America Athletic Conference Coach of the Year

Amanda Cromwell:

- Conference-USA Coach of the Year (2009)
- Soccerbuzz.com Southeast Region Coach of the Year (2005)
- NSCAA Central Region Coach of the Year (2012)
- National Intercollegiate Soccer Officials Association Coach of the Year (2004)

Tiffany Roberts Sahaydak:

- 4x American Athletic Conference Coach of the Year (2013, 2014, 2017, 2022)
- 2022 United Soccer Coaches Asian/Pacific Islander Coaches Award of Excellence (United Soccer Coaches' Coaches Communities Awards of Excellence)
- 2024 Women in Sports Leadership Award (Greater Orlando Sports Commission)

UCF Coaching Staff Collective Honors:

- 2x American Athletic Conference Coaching Staff of the Year (2018, 2022)

(Main Source on Coaching Records Listed Above)

== Individual Player Honors and Awards ==
UCF has produced a number of notable soccer stars, including two Women's World Cup Champions (Michelle Akers x2 and Amy Allman) and an Olympic Gold Medalist (Akers). Akers and Kim Wyant were founding players on the United States women's national soccer team. Akers and Amy Allman helped them win the FIFA Women's World Cup in 1991, and Akers was one of the famed "99ers" who helped the U.S. win the 1999 Women's World Cup. Akers was also a key player who helped the U.S. win the 1996 Summer Olympics. Her career was so distinguished that Pelé named her among only two female players (along with teammate Mia Hamm) on the FIFA 100 list of the greatest living soccer players in 2004. In addition, Aline Reis, an All-American in her freshman year in 2008, was selected to the Brazil women's national football team for the first time in 2009, playing in a friendly against a local Brazilian team in July. Seven former UCF players have played in Women's World Cup tournaments, and two have played in the Olympics.

=== Hermann Trophy ===
Hermann trophy

The Hermann Trophy is the sport's oldest and most prestigious award (on par with college football's Heisman Trophy). It has been awarded to one female collegiate soccer player every year since 1988.

- Michelle Akers (1988 Winner)
- Karen Richter (1990 Finalist)
- Aline Reis (2009 Watch List)
- Tishia Jewell (2012 Watch List)
- Marissa Diggs (2013 Watch List)

=== All-American Honors ===
An All-American designation identifies elite youth or collegiate players recognized for outstanding performance, typically representing the top talent in the nation. In women’s college soccer, a consensus All-American is a player who earns first-team All-America honors from multiple major recognized organizations.

Consensus All-Americans:

- Michelle Akers (4-time Consensus All-American)
- Mary Varas
- Karen Richter

All-Americans:

- Nancy Lay: NSCAA First Team All-American
- Pam Baughman: NSCAA First Team All-American
- Michelle Sedita: NSCAA First Team All-American
- Laura Dryden: NSCAA First Team All-American
- Kim Wyant: NSCAA First Team All-American
- Amy Allman: NSCAA First Team All-American
- Jean Varas: NSCAA First Team All-American
- Linda Gancitano: NSCAA First Team All-American; NSCAA All-American Reserve
- Kelly Kochevar: NSCAA First Team All-American
- Amy Jones: NSCAA First Team All-American; Soccer News Honorable Mention All-American
- Becca Thomas: NSCAA First Team All-American; NSCAA Third Team All-American
- Aline Reis: NSCAA Second Team All-American; Soccer America Freshman All-American
- Tishia Jewell: NSCAA Third Team All-American
- Marissa Diggs: NSCAA Second Team All-American; NSCAA Third Team All-American
- Tatiana Coleman: NSCAA Second Team All-American
- Vera Varis: United Soccer Coaches Association First Team All-American
- Kendra Flock: NSCAA Freshman All-American; SoccerBuzz.com Freshman All-American
- Jessica Hallgren: NSCAA Freshman All-American; SoccerBuzz.com Freshman All-American
- Jennifer Montgomery: NSCAA Freshman All-American

=== Other National Recognitions ===
- Michelle Akers: 1987 Soccer America Player of the Year; 1988 Missouri Athletic Club Player of the Year
- Amy Allman: 1987 NCAA Goalkeeper of the Year
- Kelly Kochevar: 1989 Soccer America MVP
- Karen Richter: 1990 NCAA Goalkeeper of the Year
- Tishia Jewell: 2012 Senior CLASS Award

=== Conference Honorees ===
Conference Player of the Year:

- Amy Jones (1995 Trans America Athletic Conference)
- Michelle Anderson (2001 Atlantic Sun/A-Sun Conference)

Conference Offensive Player of the Year:

- Tishia Jewell (2010 Conference-USA)
- Tatiana Coleman (2014 American Athletic Conference)
- Carol Rodrigues (2015 American Athletic Conference)
- Morgan Ferrara (2017 American Athletic Conference)
- Kristen Scott (2022 American Athletic Conference)

Conference Defensive Player of the Year:

- Courtney Baines (x3: 2003, 2004 Atlantic Sun/A-Sun Conference, 2005 Conference-USA)
- Jennifer Manis (2007 Conference-USA)
- Marissa Diggs (x2: 2012 Conference-USA, 2013 American Athletic Conference)
- Carleigh Williams (2014 American Athletic Conference)
- Saga Fredriksson (2016 American Athletic Conference)
- Konya Plummer (2019 American Athletic Conference)

Conference Midfielder of the Year:

- Becca Thomas (2009 Conference-USA)
- Kayla Adamek (2018 American Athletic Conference)
- Darya Rajaee (2021 American Athletic Conference)

Conference Goalkeeper of the Year:

- Aline Reis (2010 Conference-USA)
- Connie Organ (2014 American Athletic Conference)
- Vera Varis (x2: 2017, 2018 American Athletic Conference)
- Caroline DeLisle (x2: 2021, 2022 American Athletic Conference)

Conference Freshman/Rookie of the Year:

- Jennifer Montgomery (2002 Atlantic Sun/A-SUN Conference)
- Lena Petermann (2013 American Athletic Conference)
- Dina Orschmann (2017 American Athletic Conference)

Conference Newcomer of the Year:

- Danielle Dos Santos (2007 Conference-USA)

(Main Source on Players/Records Listed Above)

=== All Conference Players ===
All-conference is a prestigious postseason honor recognizing the best-performing players within a specific athletic league or conference, voted on by coaches. It highlights top talent (first, second, third, or freshman/rookie teams) for their performance that season.

Year	First Team	Second/Third Team	Freshman/Rookie Team
(Trans America Athletic Conference/Atlantic Sun Conference) (1993–2004)
1993	Karen Drake, Kelly Kochevar, Amy Geltz	Heather Grann, Stephanie Gringer	
1994	Heather Brann, Amy Geltz, Leslie Golden, Stephanie Gringer, Kelly Kochevar	Amy Jones, Dana Hoover	
1995	Leslie Golden, Amy Jones, Jennifer O'Connor, Kelly Stout	Michele Harris, Alyssa O'Brien, Kim Shrum	
1996	Amy Jones, Leslie Golden, Danya Harris, Alyssa O'Brien	Michele Harris, Karlyn DaPrato, Sara Kane	
1997	Danya Harris, Alyssa O'Brien, Kim Shrum	Margrette Auffant, Wendy Wiltsey	
1998	Margrette Auffant, Alyssa O'Brien	Danya Harris, Cally Howell, Sarah Pharr Leathers, Kim Shrum, Claire Kohake	
1999	Cally Howell	Michelle Anderson, Brooke Asby, Margrette Auffant, Maria Banuls, Noelle Brown, Claire Kohake	
2000	Michelle Anderson, Cally Howell, Jackie VanLooven	Claire Kohake, Sarah McDonald	Ida Edstrom
2001	Michelle Anderson, Nicole Cieslak, Jackie VanLooven	Brooke Asby	Allison Blagriff
2002	Nicole Cieslak, Jessica Kuhlman, Jennifer Montgomery, Jackie VanLooven	Allison Blagriff	Courtney Baines, Jennifer Montgomery, Summer Savage
2003	Allison Blagriff, Becca Eshelman	Courtney Baines, Patty MacDowell, Jennifer Montgomery	Monique Fireall, Kate McCain, Shannon Wing
2004	Courtney Baines, Allison Blagriff, Shannon Wing, Kendra Flock	Jennifer Montgomery	Kendra Flock, Jessica Hallgren
(Conference-USA) (2005–2012)
2005	Courtney Baines, Roberta Pelarigo		
2006	Roberta Pelarigo	Nikki Moore	Becca Thomas, Nikki Moore
2007	Jennifer Manis, Hanna Wilde, Nikki Moore	Yvonne George	Christina Petrucco
2008	Nikki Moore, Becca Thomas	Yvonne George, Aline Reis	Stacie Hubbard, Aline Reis
2009	Courtney Whidden, Becca Thomas, Nikki Moore, Aline Reis	Yvonne George, Bianca Joswiak	Bianca Joswiak, Nicolette Radovcic, Alex Brandt
2010	Tishia Jewell, Aline Reis	Marissa Diggs	
2011	Tishia Jewell, Marissa Diggs	Aline Reis, Stacie Hubbard	Carleigh Williams
2012	Nicolette Radovcic, Marissa Diggs	Tishia Jewell, Madison Barney, Lianne Maldonado	Sophie Howard
(American Athletic Conference) (2013–2022)
2013	Tatiana Coleman, Marissa Diggs, Lena Petermann	Jennifer Martin	Kayla Adamek, Caroline Bado, Lena Petermann
2014	Tatiana Coleman, Carleigh Williams, Connie Organ	Sophie Howard, Ashley Spivey, Jenn Martin	Saga Fredriksson, Hannah DeBose
2015	Kayla Adamek, Carol Rodrigues, Ashley Spivey		Vera Varis
2016	Carol Rodrigues	Morgan Ferrara, Saga Fredriksson	Zandy Soree
2017	Vera Varis, Kathellen Sousa, Saga Fredriksson, Kayla Adamek, Morgan Ferrara		
2018	Stephanie Sanders, Vera Varis	Carrie Lawrence, Dina Orschmann	Kristen Scott
2019	Konya Plummer	Kristen Scott, Zandy Soree	Caroline DeLisle, Ally Gudorf, Ellie Moreno
2020	Sarai Linder	Ellie Moreno, Madison Murnin	Katie Bradley, Sarai Linder
2021	Caroline DeLisle, Darya Rajaee, Kristen Scott		Ariel Young
2022	Caroline DeLisle, Dayanna Martin, Darya Rajaee, Kristen Scott	Georgia Eaton-Collins	Mia Asenjo
(Big 12 Conference) (2023–Present)
2023		Dayanna Martin	
2024	Chloe Netzel		
2025	Liz Worden	Genesis Perez Watson, Honoka Hamano, Maria Tregansin, Rajanah Reed	
2026	Naomi Clark, Ainsley Moy	Kalena Bellini	

== UCF Athletics Hall of Fame Inductees ==
Established in 1998, the UCF Athletics Hall of Fame honors former student-athletes, coaches, and contributors who achieved excellence in their sports or made significant contributions to the University of Central Florida's athletic programs. It recognizes decorated individuals who have left a lasting legacy on the Knights' history.

Players (Name and Year Inducted):

- Michelle Akers (1998)
- Amy Allman (1999)
- Karen Richter (2000)
- Kelly Kochevar (2008)
- Kim Wyant (2010)
- Aline Reis (2019)
- Marissa Diggs (2026)

Coaches (Name and Year Inducted):

- Karen Richter (2000)
- Jim Rudy (2001)

Note: Karen Richter was inducted for her UCF playing and coaching career achievements.

== Knights on National Teams (Senior Teams) ==
National teams are elite squads representing their country in international competitions like the FIFA Women's World Cup, the Olympics, and Confederation championship tournaments. They also play in other tournaments, such as the U.S. sponsored She Believes Cup tournament, as well as various international "friendlies" (a non-competitive, exhibition match played between club or national teams that does not count towards league standings or tournament rankings). Governed by national bodies, the members of these teams are selected from top athlete pools to compete at the highest level. The U.S. Women's National Soccer Team is the most successful of the world's national teams, having won four Women's World Cups and five Olympic soccer tournaments in their history.

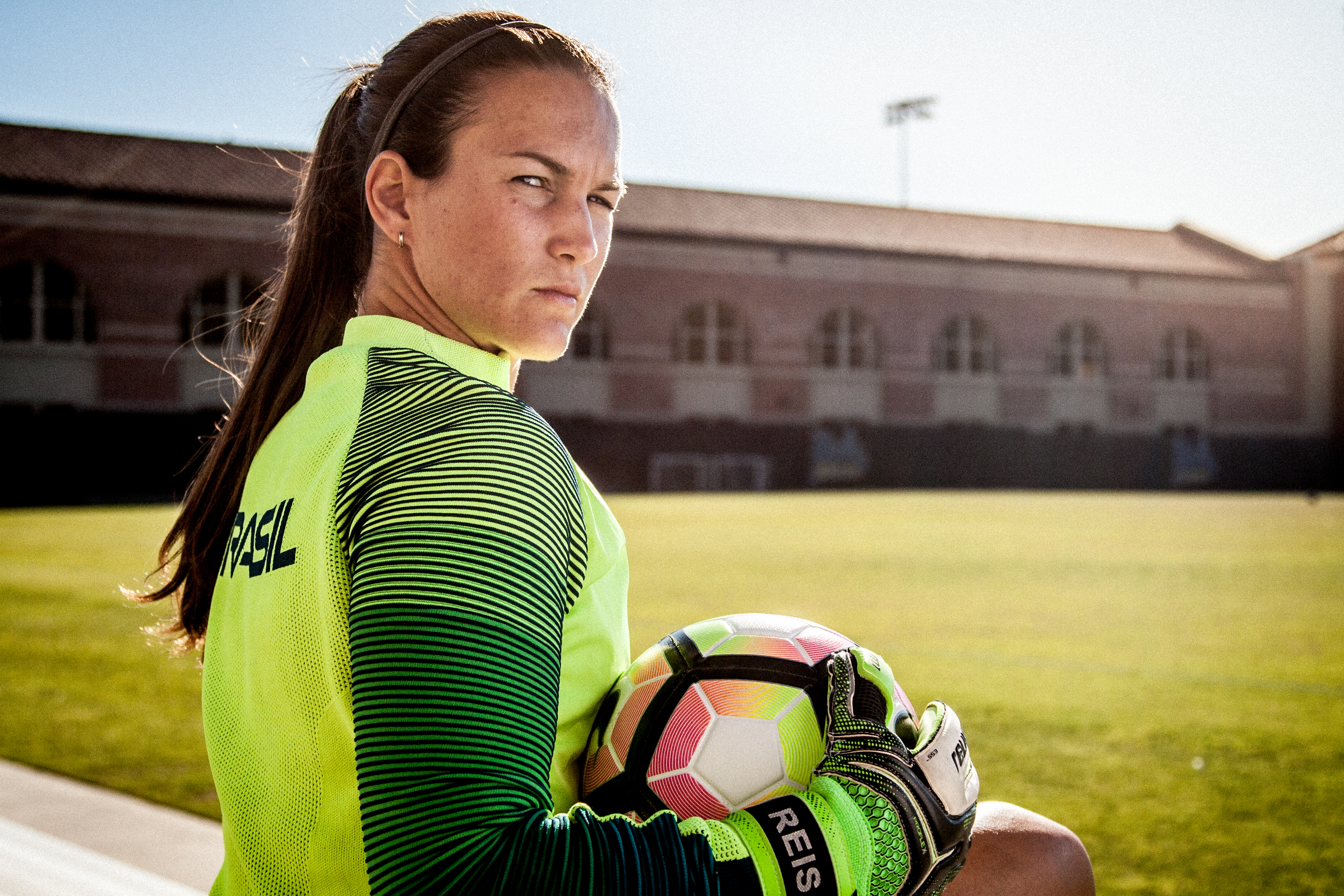
Aline Reis

=== U.S. Women's National Soccer Team ===
- Michelle Akers: 155 caps; Women's World Cup 1991, 1995, 1999; Olympic Women's Soccer Tournament 1996; Two-Time Women's World Cup Champion (1991, 1999); Olympic Gold Medalist (1996)
- Amy Allman: 24 caps; Women's World Cup 1991; Women's World Cup Champion (1991)
- Kim Wyant: 9 caps
- Linda Gancitano: 2 caps

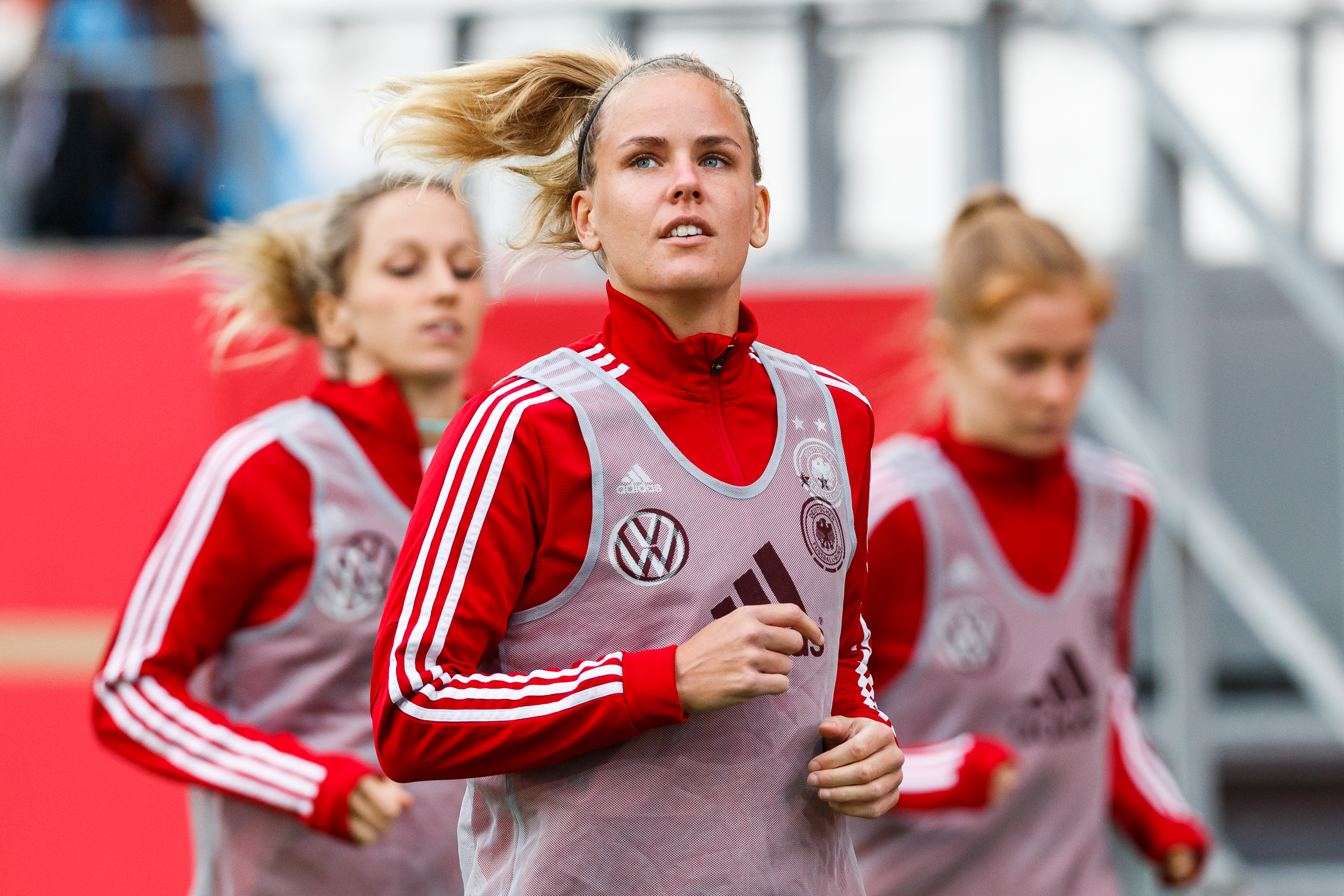
Lena Petermann

=== Brazil Women's National Football Team ===
- Aline Reis: 15 caps; Women's World Cup 2019; Olympic Women's Soccer Tournament (2016, 2020-alternate)
- Kathellen Sousa: 30 caps; Women's World Cup 2019, 2023

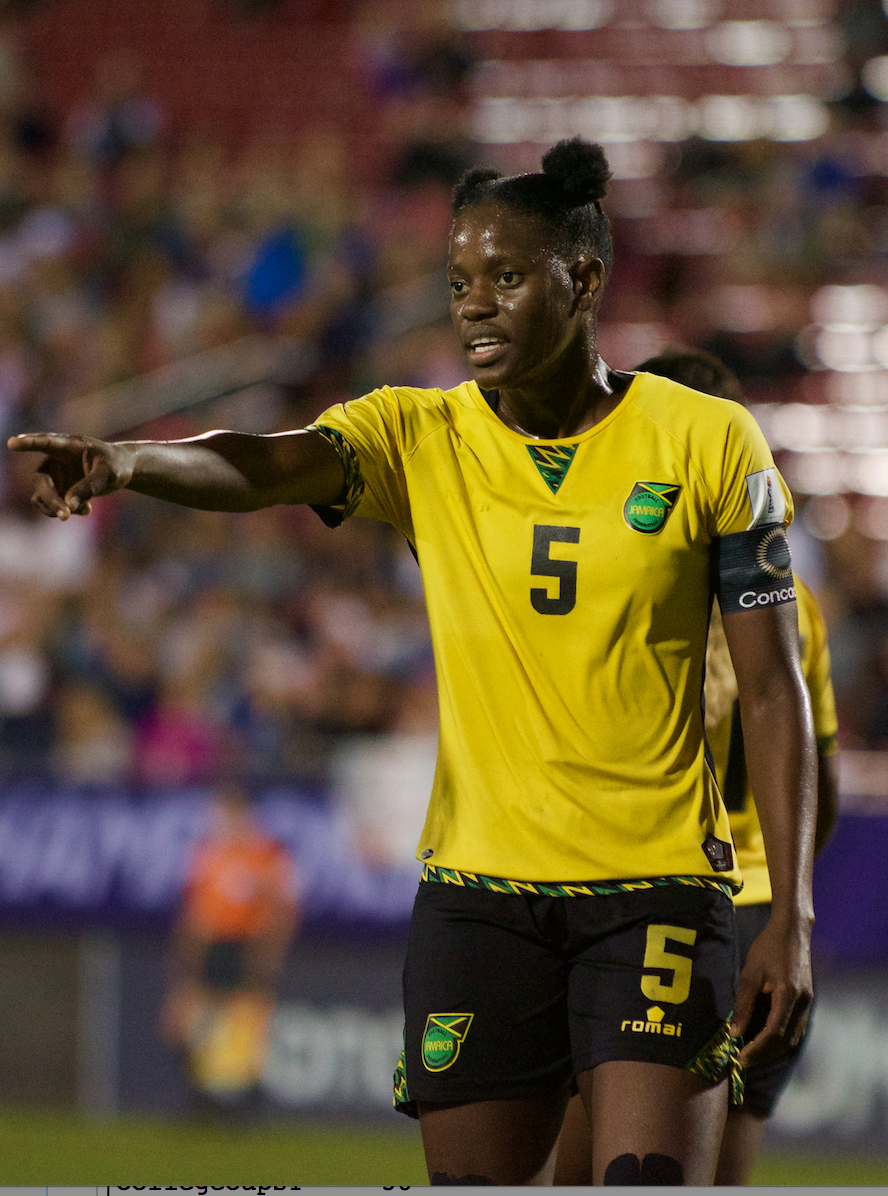
Konya Plummer

=== Germany Women's National Football Team ===
- Lena Petermann: 22 caps; Women's World Cup 2015
- Sarai Linder: 34 caps; Olympic Women's Soccer Tournament 2024; Olympic Bronze Medalist (2024)

=== Jamaica Women's National Football Team ===
- Konya Plummer: 31 caps; Women's World Cup 2019, 2023

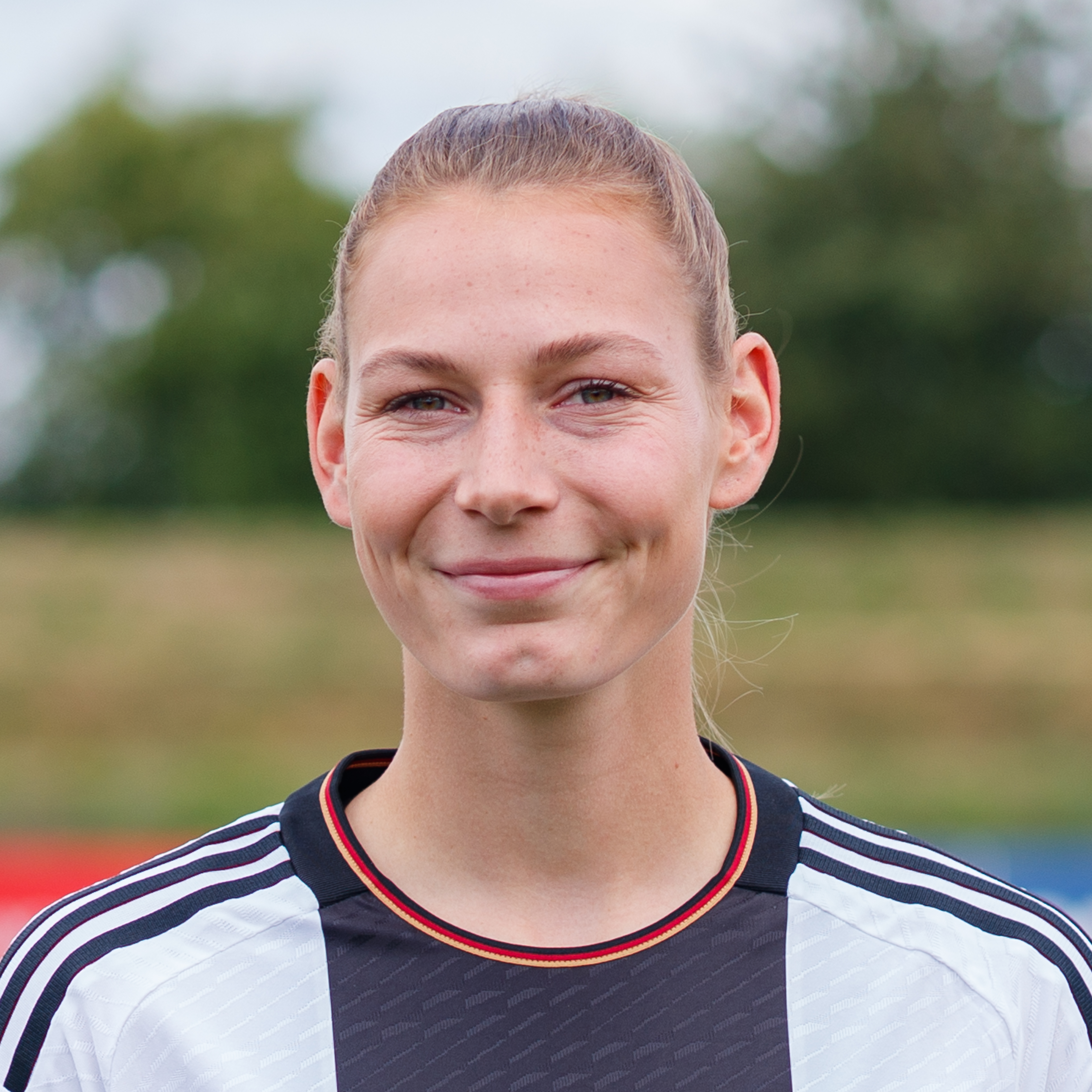
Sarai Linder

=== Costa Rica Women's National Football Team ===
- Génesis Pérez Watson: 8 caps; Women's World Cup 2023

=== Dominican Republic Women's National Football Team ===
- Mia Asenjo: 11 caps

=== Algeria Women's National Football Team ===
- Chloe N'Gazi: 13 caps

=== Poland Women's National Football Team ===
- Kayla Adamek: 23 caps

=== Scotland Women's National Football Team ===
- Sophie Howard: 64 caps

== Knights in the Pros ==
Various nations feature women's professional soccer (football) leagues (often referred to as "club leagues") that represent the highest professional level of the sport within that nation. Teams from various leagues will also often compete with teams from other leagues in their region to determine continental or regional championships. UCF has sent a number of former players to professional soccer teams from around the world. As of the 2026 season, there are 28 former UCF players on professional rosters; more than any other program in the Big 12 Conference.

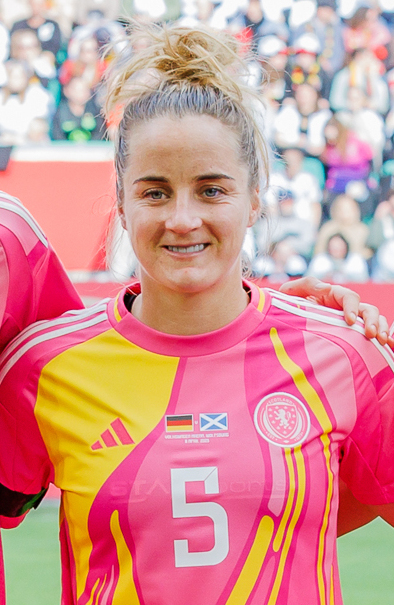
Sophie Howard

Kathellen Sousa

=== NWSL (National Women's Soccer League), U.S. ===
- Bridget Callahan (Orlando Pride)
- Konya Plummer (Orlando Pride)
- Talia Gabarra (Orlando Pride)
- Brooke Anderson (Orlando Pride)
- Kirsten Scott (Orlando Pride)
- Carrie Lawrence (Orlando Pride)
- Caroline DeLisle (San Diego Wave FC, Houston Dash)
- Nicolette Radovcic (Portland Thorns)
- Carleigh Williams (Houston Dash)
- Marissa Diggs (Houston Dash)
- Tatiana Coleman (WNY Flash)
- Rajanah Reed (Angel City FC)

=== USL Super League, U.S. ===
- Darya Rajaee (Lexington SC)
- Madison Murnin (DC Power FC)

=== USL W-League, U.S. ===
- Michelle Akers (Orlando Lions)
- Kim Wyant (Orlando Lions, Long Island Lady Riders)

=== Women's Super League (WSL), England ===
- Georgia Eaton Collins (Leicester City)
- Mollie Rouse (Sheffield United)
- Sophie Howard (Leicester City)
- Lena Petermann (Leicester City)

=== Première Ligue, France ===
- Tatiana Coleman (Paris FC)
- Kirsten Scott (AS Saint-Étienne)
- Mathilde Kack (Stade de Reims)
- Chloe N'Gazi (Montpellier HSC, Marseille, Le Havre, Fleury, Orléans, Paris Saint-Germain)
- Lena Petermann (Montpellier HSC)
- Kathellen Sousa (Bordeaux)

=== Liga F, Spain ===
- Kayla Adamek (UD Tenerife)
- Aline Reis (UD Tenerife)
- Genesis Perez Watson (Atletico de Madrid)
- Kathellen Sousa (Real Madrid)
- Kayla Adamek (Granadilla)

=== Primera Federación, Spain ===
- Mia Asenjo (DUX Logroño)
- Marta Estupinan (Villarreal CF)

=== Frauen-Bundesliga, Germany ===
- Sanja Homann (FC Nürnberg)
- Sarai Linder (VFL Wolfsburg, TSG Hoffenheim)
- Ally Gudorf (SC Freiburg)
- Lena Petermann (SV Werder Bremen, Turbine Potsdam, SC Freiburg)
- Sophie Howard (1899 Hoffenheim)

=== Regionalliga Nordost, Germany ===
- Dina Orschmann (FC Union Berlin)

=== Liga BPI, Portugal ===
- Liz Worden (Racing Power FC)
- Georgia Eaton-Collins (Sporting CP)

=== A-Liga, Denmark ===
- Georgia Eaton Collins (HB Køge)
- Ariel Young (Fortuna Hjørring)

=== Kansallinen Liiga, Finland ===
- Vera Varis (Kuopion Palloseura)

=== Liga MX Femenil, Mexico ===
- Dayana Martin (Club America, FC Juarez)
- Konya Plummer (Tigres UANL)

=== Brazilian Women's Football Championship, Brazil ===
- Carol Rodrigues (Santos FC Women)

=== Damallsvenskan, Sweden ===
- Annika Huhta (Kristiandstads DFF)
- Kayla Adamek (Vittsjö GIK)

=== Division 1 Mellersta, Sweden ===
- Michelle Akers (Tyresö FF)
- Saga Fredriksson (Malmö FF)

=== Besta deild kvenna, Iceland ===
- Vera Varis (UMF Stjarnan)

=== Serie A Women, Italy ===
- Sophie Howard (FC Como Women)
- Kathellen Sousa (Internazionale)

=== Northern Super League, Canada ===
- Ariel Young (Vancouver Rise FC, Ottawa Fury)
- Kayla Adamek (Ottawa Rapid FC, Ottawa Fury)

=== Turkcell Kadin Futbol Süper Ligi, Turkey ===
- Konya Plummer (Fenerbahçe SK)

=== Saudi Pro League, Saudi Arabia ===
- Kathellen Sousa (Al Nassr)
- Aline Reis (Al-Ula FC)

== Seasons ==
Season	Coach	Record		Notes
Season	Coach	Overall	Conference	Notes
Independent
1981	Jim Rudy	11–3–0	—	AIAW Finals
1982	Jim Rudy	10–1–2	—	NCAA Finals
1983	Jim Rudy	4–4–2	—	
1984	Jim Rudy	10–4–0	—	NCAA Second Round
1985	Jim Rudy	9–3–1	—	
1986	Jim Rudy	15–3–1	—	
1987	Jim Rudy	13–5–0	—	NCAA Semifinals (Final Four)
1988	Bill Barker	10–3–2	—	NCAA Second Round
1989	Bill Barker	11–1–2	—	
1990	Bill Barker	9–4–3	—	
1991	Bill Barker	10–5–1	—	NCAA First Round
1992	Bill Barker	10–5–1	—	
Trans America Athletic Conference/Atlantic Sun Conference
1993	Karen Richter	8–7–1	5–1–0	TAAC Regular Season Champions
1994	Karen Richter	13–5–1	5–1–0	TAAC East Division and Tournament Champions
1995	Karen Richter	10–7–4	6–1–1	TAAC East Division and Tournament Champions
1996	Karen Richter	13–7–1	6–3–1	TAAC Tournament Champions
1997	Karen Richter	8–10–2	6–0–0	TAAC South Division Champions
1998	Karen Richter	12–8–0	4–0–0	TAAC East Division and Tournament Champions; NCAA First Round
1999	Amanda Cromwell	16–6–1	8–0–1	TAAC Regular Season and Tournament Champions; NCAA Second Round
2000	Amanda Cromwell	8–11–1	7–2–0	
2001	Amanda Cromwell	14–6–0	9–1–0	A-Sun Regular Season and Tournament Champions; NCAA First Round
2002	Amanda Cromwell	18–5–0	10–1–0	A-Sun Regular Season and Tournament Champions; NCAA First Round
2003	Amanda Cromwell	16–5–1	9–1–0	A-Sun Regular Season and Tournament Champions; NCAA First Round
2004	Amanda Cromwell	17–4–2	8–2–0	NCAA Second Round
Conference USA
2005	Amanda Cromwell	12–10–0	8–1–0	C-USA Regular Season Champions
2006	Amanda Cromwell	11–6–2	7–1–1	
2007	Amanda Cromwell	15–4–4	7–1–1	C-USA Regular Season Champions; NCAA Second Round
2008	Amanda Cromwell	14–6–3	7–2–2	NCAA Second Round
2009	Amanda Cromwell	17–5–1	10–1–0	C-USA Regular Season Champions; NCAA Second Round
2010	Amanda Cromwell	16–5–3	8–1–2	C-USA Regular Season Champions; NCAA Second Round
2011	Amanda Cromwell	13–5–6	6–2–3	NCAA Quarterfinals (Elite Eight)
2012	Amanda Cromwell	17–5–2	8–3–0	C-USA Tournament Champions; NCAA Second Round
American Athletic Conference
2013	Tiffany Roberts Sahaydak	16–3–4	8–0–1	American Regular Season and Tournament Champions; NCAA First Round
2014	Tiffany Roberts Sahaydak	18–5–0	8–1–0	American Regular Season Champions; NCAA Sweet 16
2015	Tiffany Roberts Sahaydak	12–6–2	6–3–0	NCAA First Round
2016	Tiffany Roberts Sahaydak	9–8–2	4–4–1	
2017	Tiffany Roberts Sahaydak	13–2–3	7–0–2	American Regular Season Champions; NCAA First Round
2018	Tiffany Roberts Sahaydak	10–7–1	6–3–0	
2019	Tiffany Roberts Sahaydak	11–4–4	5–2–2	
2020	Tiffany Roberts Sahaydak	2-4-1	2-4-1	
2021	Tiffany Roberts Sahaydak	8-7-1	3-4-1	
2022	Tiffany Roberts Sahaydak	9-2-7	7–0–1	American Regular Season Champions; NCAA First Round
Big 12 Conference
2023	Tiffany Roberts Sahaydak	10-7-1	5-4-1	
2024	Tiffany Roberts Sahaydak	3-6-6	1-5-4	
2025	Tiffany Roberts Sahaydak	12-4-5	5-1-5	NCAA Second Round
2026	Tiffany Roberts Sahaydak	11-6-2	6-3-2	NCAA First Round
Totals		545–233–87	225–59–35	884 games (.679)
Records are through the conclusion of the 2026 season.

== See also ==
- UCF Knights men's soccer
- List of University of Central Florida alumni
