= Carl Henrik Fredriksson =

Swedish literary critic, writer, and translator

- Fredriksson at an interview with The Vienna Review in 2013
- Born: Carl Henrik (CH) Fredriksson; 1 October 1965 (age 60); Jönköping, Sweden
- Education: Lund University
- Occupations: Editor, Writer, Translator
- Notable work: Eurozine

Carl Henrik Fredriksson (born 1 October 1965 in Jönköping, Sweden) is a Swedish literary critic, columnist, essayist, and translator living in Vienna, Austria. For fifteen years, until March 2015, he was the editor-in-chief of the European cultural journals network Eurozine, which he co-founded in 1998. Between 1998 and 2001, he was the editor-in-chief of Sweden's oldest cultural journal Ord&Bild, where he had worked as an editor since 1995.

He is a permanent fellow at the Institute for Media and Communication Policy (Institut für Medien- und Kommunikationspolitik) in Berlin and the programme director of Debates on Europe, a joint initiative of the S. Fischer Stiftung and the Deutsche Akademie für Sprache und Dichtung.

From 1987 to 1995, Fredriksson studied comparative literature, philosophy, sociology, and art history at Lund University, and European history of ideas and hermeneutics at University of Gothenburg.

Since 1988, he has contributed articles on poetry, literature, literary theory, art, philosophy, media, and politics to numerous Swedish and international newspapers and journals, including 90-tal, Courrier International, Dagens Nyheter, Glänta, Göteborgs-Posten, Ord&Bild, Pequod, Reč, Svenska Dagbladet, Sydsvenska Dagbladet, Varlık, Vikerkaar, and Wespennest. He has also been a regular contributor to Swedish public service radio (Sveriges Radio).

Translations into Swedish include works by Ulrich Beck, John N. Gray, Jürgen Habermas, Josef Haslinger, Adolf Muschg, Seymour Papert, Judith Schalansky, Raoul Schrott and Immanuel Wallerstein.
