= Henrik Frederiksen =

Danish businessman and vintage car collector

- Born: 20 June 1944
- Died: 1 February 2026 (aged 81)
- Occupation: businessman
- Known for: Car collection
- Spouse: Vivi Frederiksen (died 2015)

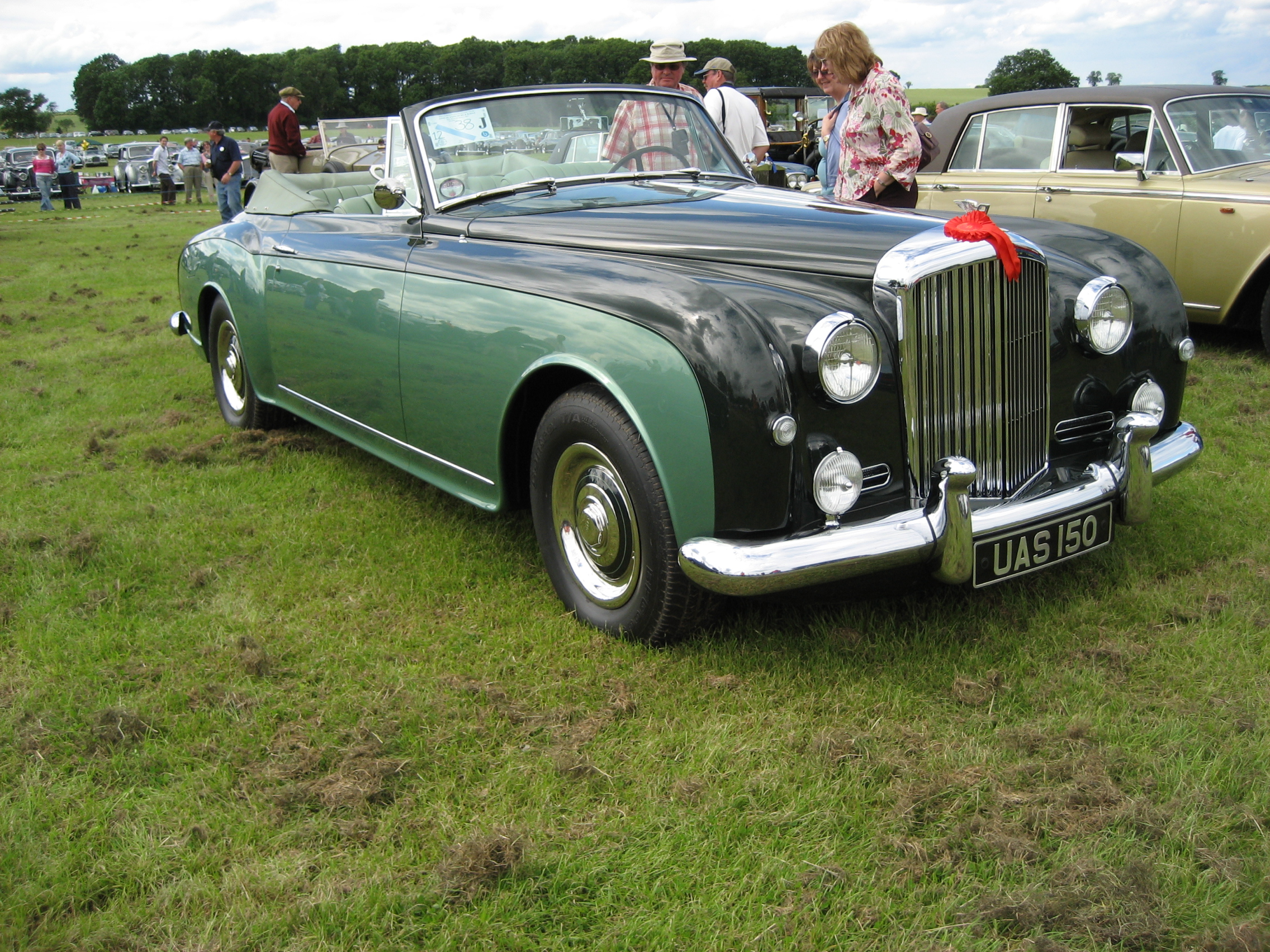
A 1956 Bentley S1 drophead coupe

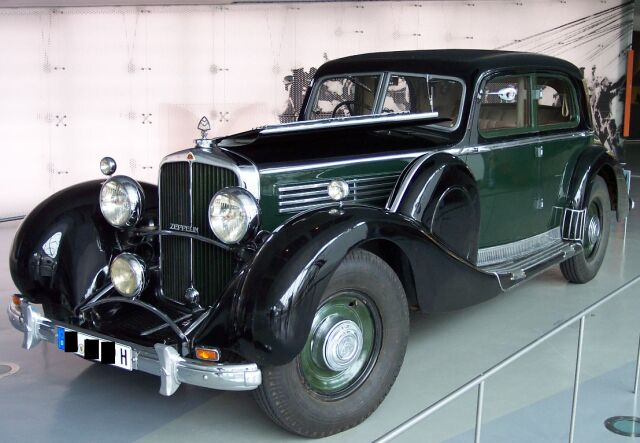
A Maybach Zeppelin

Henrik Frederiksen (20 June 1944 – 1 February 2026) was a Danish businessman and vintage car collector.

Frederiksen has been called "one of Denmark's wealthiest men".

Frederiksen grew up in Virum and began his career as a student in Matas. As a 27-year-old, he became an independent materialist, and in the following years bought eight more Matas stores. When Matas was sold to CVC Capital Partners in 2007, Frederiksen was among the largest shareholders.

In 2015, Bonham's auctioned his collection of 48 cars, mostly pre-war, including Rolls-Royce, Bentley, Mercedes-Benz, Lagonda and Maybach, at his home Lyngsbækgård, a 16th century manor house built for the Danish royal family, close to Ebeltoft on the eastern coast of Jutland. The sale was expected to raise $25–40 million. His cars included a Bentley S1 Drophead Coupé, first owned by John D. Rockefeller Jr.

Frederiksen was married to Vivi until her death in Spring 2015. Her favourite car was a 1937 Maybach SW38 Zeppelin Special Roadster. They had built the car collection together and had never sold a car, but her death led to him selling the entire collection.
