= Saga Fredriksson =

Swedish footballer (born 1994)

Personal information
- Date of birth: 3 October 1994 (age 32)
- Place of birth: Malmö, Sweden
- Height: 1.60 m (5 ft 3 in)
- Position: Defender

College career
Years	Team	Apps	(Gls)
2014–2017	UCF Knights	70	(1)

Senior career*
Years	Team	Apps	(Gls)
2010–2013	LdB FC Malmö	17	(1)
2018	Limhamn Bunkeflo	10	(0)
2018–2019	Sassuolo	3	(0)
2020–2023	Malmö FF		

International career^{‡}
2010–2011	Sweden U17	5	(0)
2011–2012	Sweden U19	8	(0)
- * Club domestic league appearances and goals as of 15 March 2023 ‡ National team caps and goals as of 15 March 2023

Saga Fredriksson (born 3 October 1994) is a Swedish former footballer and pundit for Viaplay. She played as a defender for Malmö FF. As well as playing in her homeland she also played for sides in the United States and Italy.

== Club career ==
She played for LdB FC Malmö from 2010 to 2013, winning two Damallsvenskan titles in 2010 and 2013 and a Super Cup in 2012. In August 2018 she joined Italian Serie A club US Sassuolo Calcio playing three matches, helping them to a fifth placed finish in the league. She ended her career with her hometown club, Malmö FF, helping them to three consecutive promotions before announcing her retirement in September 2023.

== International career ==
She was part of the Sweden U-19 that won the 2012 UEFA Women's U-19 Championship.

== Honours ==
=== Club ===
LdB FC Malmö

Winner

- Damallsvenskan(3): 2010, 2011, 2013
- Svenska Supercupen(2): 2011, 2012

Runner-up

- Damallsvenskan: 2012

UCF Knights

Winner

- American Regular Season(2): 2014, 2017

Malmö FF

Winner

- Division 4 Sydvästra Skåne: 2020
- Division 3 Sydvästra Skåne: 2021
- Division 2 Södra Götaland: 2022

=== International ===
Winner

- UEFA Women's U-19 Championship: 2012

=== Individual ===
- AAC All-Rookie Team: 2014
- AAC Co-Defensive Player of the Year: 2016
- All-Conference Second Team: 2016
