= 2016 NCAA Division I women's soccer season =

NCAA Division I women's soccer
- Season: 2016
- Champions: USC (2nd title)

The 2016 NCAA Division I women's soccer season was the 35th season of NCAA championship women's college soccer. The Penn State Nittany Lions were the defending national champions.

== Changes from 2015 ==
=== Conference realignment ===
School	Previous conference	New conference
Coastal Carolina	Big South Conference	Sun Belt Conference
Kansas State	No team	Independent

== Season overview ==
=== Polls ===
==== Pre-season polls ====
NSCAA
Rank	Team
1	Florida State
2	Penn State
3	Duke
4	Virginia
5	Stanford
6	West Virginia
7	Florida
8	Texas A&M
9	North Carolina
10	Rutgers
11	USC
12	Auburn
13	Notre Dame
14	Clemson
15	Connecticut
16	BYU
17	Virginia Tech
18	California
19	Texas Tech
20	Arizona
21	Santa Clara
22	Ole Miss
23	Ohio State
24	South Carolina
25	Loyola Marymount

Soccer America
Rank	Team
1	Stanford
2	Duke
3	Florida State
4	West Virginia
5	Penn State
6	Florida
7	Virginia
8	USC
9	Texas A&M
10	Clemson
11	Connecticut
12	North Carolina
13	Rutgers
14	Auburn
15	California
16	BYU
17	UCLA
18	Wisconsin
19	Notre Dame
20	Virginia Tech
21	Texas Tech
22	Ohio State
23	South Carolina
24	Arizona
25	Boston College

Top Drawer Soccer
Rank	Team
1	Stanford
2	Florida State
3	Duke
4	Penn State
5	West Virginia
6	Virginia
7	Florida
8	USC
9	Connecticut
10	Clemson
11	Rutgers
12	North Carolina
13	Texas A&M
14	Auburn
15	California
16	Wisconsin
17	BYU
18	Arizona
19	Minnesota
20	Virginia Tech
21	Ohio State
22	Santa Clara
23	Ole Miss
24	FGCU
25	Boston College

Hero Sports
Rank	Team
1	Penn State
2	Stanford
3	Florida State
4	Duke
5	West Virginia
6	USC
7	Virginia
8	Florida
9	Clemson
10	Virginia Tech
11	Texas A&M
12	North Carolina
13	BYU
14	California
15	South Carolina
16	Texas Tech
17	Santa Clara
18	Minnesota
19	Connecticut
20	Notre Dame
21	Arizona
22	Auburn
23	Washington State
24	Ohio State
25	Rutgers

==== Final polls ====
NSCAA
Rank	Team
1	USC
2	West Virginia
3	Georgetown
4	North Carolina
5	South Carolina
6	Stanford
7	Duke
8	Auburn
9	BYU
10	Florida
11	Virginia
12	Clemson
13	UCLA
14	Florida State
15	Minnesota
16	Utah
17	Santa Clara
18	Northwestern
19	Arkansas
20	Connecticut
21	Notre Dame
22	Pepperdine
23	Colorado
24	NC State
25	Rutgers

Soccer America
Rank	Team
1	West Virginia
2	Stanford
3	Florida
4	South Carolina
5	Georgetown
6	BYU
7	Florida State
8	North Carolina
9	USC
10	Notre Dame
11	Clemson
12	Connecticut
13	Minnesota
14	Duke
15	Virginia
16	Colorado
17	Arkansas
18	Auburn
19	Utah
20	UCLA
21	Rutgers
22	Northwestern
23	Cal
24	Penn State
25	Pepperdine

Top Drawer Soccer
Rank	Team
1	USC
2	West Virginia
3	Georgetown
4	North Carolina
5	South Carolina
6	Duke
7	Auburn
8	Santa Clara
9	Stanford
10	BYU
11	Florida
12	Connecticut
13	Clemson
14	UCLA
15	Virginia
16	Arkansas
17	Pepperdine
18	Rutgers
19	Florida State
20	Kansas
21	Minnesota
22	Notre Dame
23	NC State
24	Northwestern
25	Colorado

Hero Sports
Rank	Team
1	USC
2	West Virginia
3	Stanford
4	BYU
5	Georgetown
6	North Carolina
7	South Carolina
8	Virginia
9	UCLA
10	Florida
11	Auburn
12	Santa Clara
13	Minnesota
14	Duke
15	Clemson
16	Utah
17	Cal
18	Florida State
19	Notre Dame
20	Colorado
21	Arkansas
22	Penn State
23	Oklahoma
24	Pepperdine
25	Long Beach State

Note: Soccer America released its final poll on November 7, 2016, before the NCAA Tournament

=== Major upsets ===
Games won by a team ranked 10 or more spots lower or an unranked squad that defeats a team ranked #15 or higher are considered "major upsets". Only NSCAA rankings are used for this list.

Date	Winner	Score	Loser
August 19, 2016	#21 Santa Clara	3–2 (a.e.t)	#11 USC
August 19, 2016	Pepperdine	3–1	#20 Arizona
August 21, 2016	Oklahoma	4–1	#25 Loyola Marymount
August 22, 2016	Nebraska	1–0	#14 BYU
August 25, 2016	Michigan	2–0	#12 Notre Dame
August 25, 2016	Washington State	1–0	#13 Santa Clara
August 26, 2016	Arkansas	2–1	#2 Duke
September 5, 2016	South Alabama	1–0	#1 Florida State
September 22, 2016	Vanderbilt	2–0	#14 Texas A&M
September 25, 2016	Alabama	2–1	#14 Texas A&M

=== Standings ===
2016 American Athletic Conference women's soccer standings
	Conf.						Overall
Team	W		L		T	PCT	W		L		T	PCT
No. 20 Connecticut ‍†‍‡‍^{y}	8	–	0	–	1	.944	19	–	3	–	1	.848
Memphis ‍‍‍^{y}	8	–	1	–	0	.889	14	–	5	–	1	.725
SMU ‍‍‍^{y}	6	–	2	–	1	.722	13	–	7	–	2	.636
USF ‍‍‍	4	–	3	–	2	.556	12	–	4	–	3	.711
Cincinnati ‍‍‍	4	–	3	–	2	.556	11	–	5	–	4	.650
UCF ‍‍‍	4	–	4	–	1	.500	9	–	8	–	2	.526
Tulsa ‍‍‍	4	–	5	–	0	.444	8	–	10	–	1	.447
Houston ‍‍‍	1	–	6	–	2	.222	6	–	7	–	3	.469
East Carolina ‍‍‍	1	–	7	–	1	.167	5	–	12	–	1	.306
Temple ‍‍‍	0	–	9	–	0	.000	3	–	16	–	0	.158
† – Conference champion ‡ – 2016 AAC Tournament champion y – Invited to the NCAA tournament As of 2016-11-20; Rankings from NSCAA

2016 America East Conference women's soccer standings
	Conf.						Overall
Team	W		L		T	PCT	W		L		T	PCT
Hartford ‍†‍‍	6	–	1	–	1	.813	13	–	5	–	1	.711
Albany ‍†‍‡‍^{y}	6	–	1	–	1	.813	11	–	8	–	1	.575
Stony Brook ‍‍‍	6	–	2	–	0	.750	9	–	8	–	3	.525
New Hampshire ‍‍‍	3	–	4	–	1	.438	7	–	9	–	3	.447
Maine ‍‍‍	3	–	5	–	0	.375	7	–	9	–	0	.438
UMass Lowell * ‍‍‍	3	–	5	–	0	.375	5	–	10	–	2	.353
Vermont ‍‍‍	2	–	4	–	2	.375	7	–	8	–	4	.474
UMBC ‍‍‍	2	–	5	–	1	.313	6	–	10	–	1	.382
Binghamton ‍‍‍	2	–	6	–	0	.250	6	–	10	–	2	.389
† – Conference champion ‡ – 2016 America East Tournament champion y – Invited to the NCAA tournament * – UMass Lowell ineligible for postseason (D2 to D1 regulations); As of 2016-11-17; Rankings from NSCAA

2016 Atlantic 10 Conference women's soccer standings
	Conf.						Overall
Team	W		L		T	PCT	W		L		T	PCT
Saint Joseph's ‍†‍‍	9	–	0	–	1	.950	18	–	2	–	2	.864
Saint Louis ‍‍‍	7	–	1	–	2	.800	14	–	4	–	2	.750
Duquesne ‍‍‍	7	–	2	–	1	.750	11	–	6	–	3	.625
Fordham ‍‍‍	5	–	1	–	4	.700	10	–	5	–	5	.625
George Mason ‍‍‍	6	–	3	–	1	.650	13	–	7	–	1	.643
George Washington ‍‍‍	4	–	3	–	3	.550	11	–	7	–	3	.595
Dayton ‍‍‡‍^{y}	4	–	4	–	2	.500	9	–	10	–	3	.477
Rhode Island ‍‍‍	3	–	4	–	3	.450	6	–	8	–	5	.447
Richmond ‍‍‍	4	–	6	–	0	.400	9	–	9	–	1	.500
VCU ‍‍‍	4	–	6	–	0	.400	8	–	10	–	1	.447
LaSalle ‍‍‍	2	–	4	–	4	.400	4	–	10	–	4	.333
UMass ‍‍‍	1	–	7	–	2	.200	3	–	11	–	3	.265
Davidson ‍‍‍	1	–	8	–	1	.150	5	–	13	–	1	.289
St. Bonaventure ‍‍‍	1	–	9	–	0	.100	4	–	14	–	1	.237
† – Conference champion ‡ – 2016 Atlantic 10 Tournament champion y – Invited to the NCAA tournament As of 2016-11-17; Rankings from NSCAA

2016 Atlantic Sun Conference women's soccer standings
	Conf.						Overall
Team	W		L		T	PCT	W		L		T	PCT
Florida Gulf Coast ‍†‍‡‍^{y}	6	–	0	–	1	.929	14	–	5	–	1	.725
Lipscomb ‍‍‍	5	–	1	–	1	.786	12	–	5	–	2	.684
Stetson ‍‍‍	5	–	2	–	0	.714	9	–	7	–	2	.556
Kennesaw State ‍‍‍	4	–	3	–	0	.571	10	–	8	–	1	.553
Jacksonville ‍‍‍	2	–	4	–	1	.357	4	–	11	–	1	.281
North Florida ‍‍‍	2	–	5	–	0	.286	6	–	9	–	2	.412
NJIT ‍‍‍	2	–	5	–	0	.286	6	–	9	–	3	.417
USC Upstate ‍‍‍	0	–	6	–	1	.071	0	–	14	–	3	.088
† – Conference champion ‡ – 2016 Atlantic Sun Tournament champion y – Invited to the NCAA tournament As of November 17, 2016; Rankings from NSCAA

2016 ACC women's soccer standings
	Conf.						Overall
Team	W		L		T	PCT	W		L		T	PCT
#21 Notre Dame ‍†‍‍^{y}	7	–	1	–	2	.800	13	–	3	–	5	.738
No. 12 Clemson ‍†‍‍^{y}	7	–	1	–	2	.800	14	–	5	–	4	.696
No. 7 Duke ‍‍‍^{y}	7	–	2	–	1	.750	15	–	4	–	3	.750
#4 North Carolina ‍‍‍^{y}	6	–	2	–	2	.700	16	–	3	–	4	.783
No. 11 Virginia ‍‍‍^{y}	6	–	2	–	2	.700	15	–	5	–	2	.727
No. 14 Florida State ‍‍‡‍^{y}	6	–	2	–	2	.700	14	–	4	–	4	.727
Miami ‍‍‍	5	–	5	–	0	.500	10	–	8	–	1	.553
No. 24 NC State ‍‍‍^{y}	4	–	5	–	1	.450	11	–	9	–	2	.545
Virginia Tech ‍‍‍	3	–	4	–	3	.450	11	–	5	–	3	.658
Louisville ‍‍‍	2	–	5	–	3	.350	7	–	7	–	4	.500
Boston College ‍‍‍	3	–	7	–	0	.300	11	–	8	–	1	.575
Wake Forest ‍‍‍	2	–	8	–	0	.200	10	–	8	–	0	.556
Syracuse ‍‍‍	1	–	7	–	2	.200	8	–	8	–	3	.500
Pittsburgh ‍‍‍	1	–	9	–	0	.100	2	–	15	–	1	.139
† – Conference champion ‡ – 2016 ACC Tournament champion y – Invited to the NCAA tournament As of 2016-7-2; Rankings from NSCAA

2016 Big East Conference women's soccer standings
	Conf.						Overall
Team	W		L		T	PCT	W		L		T	PCT
Marquette ‍†‍‍^{y}	7	–	2	–	0	.778	12	–	8	–	2	.591
DePaul ‍†‍‍	7	–	2	–	0	.778	10	–	6	–	3	.605
No. 3 Georgetown ‍‍‡‍^{y}	6	–	1	–	2	.778	19	–	2	–	3	.854
St. John's ‍‍‍	5	–	2	–	2	.667	11	–	4	–	5	.675
Providence ‍‍‍	5	–	3	–	1	.611	11	–	7	–	2	.600
Butler ‍‍‍	4	–	4	–	1	.500	11	–	7	–	2	.600
Creighton ‍‍‍	4	–	5	–	0	.444	9	–	6	–	2	.588
Villanova ‍‍‍	2	–	7	–	0	.222	4	–	14	–	0	.222
Seton Hall ‍‍‍	1	–	8	–	0	.111	5	–	11	–	1	.324
Xavier ‍‍‍	1	–	8	–	0	.111	7	–	11	–	1	.395
† – Conference champion ‡ – 2016 Big East Tournament champion y – Invited to the NCAA tournament As of 2016-11-21; Rankings from NSCAA

2016 Big Sky Conference women's soccer standings
	Conf.						Overall
Team	W		L		T	PCT	W		L		T	PCT
Idaho ‍†‍‍	7	–	1	–	2	.800	10	–	5	–	4	.632
Sacramento State ‍‍‍	6	–	2	–	2	.700	8	–	7	–	4	.526
Northern Arizona ‍‍‍	5	–	2	–	3	.650	10	–	7	–	5	.568
Montana ‍‍‍	5	–	2	–	3	.650	9	–	6	–	5	.575
Eastern Washington ‍‍‡‍^{y}	5	–	3	–	2	.600	13	–	5	–	4	.682
Northern Colorado ‍‍‍	5	–	4	–	1	.550	10	–	8	–	2	.550
Portland State ‍‍‍	4	–	5	–	1	.450	6	–	11	–	1	.361
Idaho State ‍‍‍	4	–	6	–	0	.400	7	–	13	–	0	.350
Weber State ‍‍‍	3	–	6	–	1	.350	5	–	10	–	2	.353
Southern Utah ‍‍‍	2	–	7	–	1	.250	3	–	12	–	2	.235
North Dakota ‍‍‍	1	–	9	–	0	.100	2	–	14	–	2	.167
† – Conference champion ‡ – 2016 Big Sky Tournament champion y – Invited to the NCAA tournament As of 2016-11-17; Rankings from NSCAA

2016 Big South Conference women's soccer standings
	Conf.						Overall
Team	W		L		T	PCT	W		L		T	PCT
High Point ‍†‍‍	7	–	1	–	1	.833	13	–	6	–	2	.667
Liberty ‍‍‡‍^{y}	7	–	2	–	0	.778	14	–	8	–	0	.636
Campbell ‍‍‍	6	–	3	–	0	.667	12	–	8	–	0	.600
Gardner–Webb ‍‍‍	6	–	3	–	0	.667	9	–	8	–	3	.525
Radford ‍‍‍	5	–	4	–	0	.556	7	–	9	–	0	.438
Longwood ‍‍‍	5	–	3	–	1	.611	8	–	10	–	2	.450
UNC Asheville ‍‍‍	3	–	6	–	0	.333	8	–	12	–	0	.400
Charleston Southern ‍‍‍	2	–	6	–	1	.278	6	–	11	–	1	.361
Winthrop ‍‍‍	1	–	7	–	1	.167	4	–	12	–	1	.265
Presbyterian ‍‍‍	1	–	8	–	0	.111	3	–	14	–	0	.176
† – Conference champion ‡ – 2016 Big South Tournament champion y – Invited to the NCAA tournament As of 2016-11-17; Rankings from NSCAA

2016 Big Ten Conference women's soccer standings
	Conf.						Overall
Team	W		L		T	PCT	W		L		T	PCT
No. 18 Northwestern ‍†‍‍^{y}	7	–	1	–	3	.773	16	–	3	–	4	.783
No. 15 Minnesota ‍†‍‡‍^{y}	7	–	1	–	3	.773	16	–	3	–	4	.783
Penn State ‍†‍‍^{y}	7	–	1	–	3	.773	12	–	5	–	4	.667
Michigan ‍‍‍^{y}	6	–	3	–	2	.636	10	–	5	–	5	.625
Wisconsin ‍‍‍^{y}	5	–	2	–	4	.636	9	–	5	–	8	.591
Nebraska ‍‍‍^{y}	5	–	3	–	3	.591	11	–	6	–	5	.614
No. 25 Rutgers ‍‍‍^{y}	4	–	2	–	5	.591	12	–	5	–	6	.652
Ohio State ‍‍‍^{y}	4	–	4	–	3	.500	11	–	7	–	3	.595
Indiana ‍‍‍	4	–	4	–	3	.500	7	–	9	–	4	.450
Michigan State ‍‍‍	4	–	7	–	0	.364	7	–	10	–	1	.417
Illinois ‍‍‍	3	–	6	–	2	.364	6	–	11	–	2	.368
Purdue ‍‍‍	2	–	8	–	1	.227	4	–	12	–	1	.265
Iowa ‍‍‍	2	–	9	–	0	.182	8	–	11	–	0	.421
Maryland ‍‍‍	1	–	10	–	0	.091	3	–	15	–	1	.184
† – Conference champion ‡ – 2016 Big Ten Tournament champion y – Invited to the NCAA tournament As of 2016-11-21; Rankings from NSCAA

2016 Big West Conference women's soccer standings
	Conf.						Overall
Team	W		L		T	PCT	W		L		T	PCT
Cal State Northridge ‍†‍‍	6	–	1	–	1	.813	11	–	5	–	5	.643
UC Irvine ‍‍‍	5	–	2	–	1	.688	13	–	7	–	2	.636
Long Beach State ‍‍‡‍^{y}	4	–	1	–	3	.688	10	–	7	–	4	.571
Cal State Fullerton ‍‍‍	5	–	3	–	0	.625	8	–	10	–	1	.447
UC Davis ‍‍‍	3	–	3	–	2	.500	7	–	8	–	4	.474
UC Santa Barbara ‍‍‍	2	–	5	–	1	.313	11	–	6	–	2	.632
Hawaii ‍‍‍	2	–	5	–	1	.313	9	–	6	–	2	.588
UC Riverside ‍‍‍	2	–	5	–	1	.313	5	–	10	–	4	.368
Cal Poly ‍‍‍	1	–	5	–	2	.250	6	–	10	–	3	.395
† – Conference champion ‡ – 2016 Big West Tournament champion y – Invited to the NCAA Tournament; As of 2016-11-17; Rankings from NSCAA

2016 Big 12 Conference women's soccer standings
	Conf.						Overall
Team	W		L		T	PCT	W		L		T	PCT
No. 2 West Virginia ‍†‍‡‍^{y}	8	–	0	–	0	1.000	23	–	2	–	2	.889
Kansas ‍‍‍^{y}	5	–	1	–	2	.750	11	–	6	–	4	.619
Baylor ‍‍‍	4	–	3	–	1	.563	12	–	7	–	1	.625
Oklahoma ‍‍‍^{y}	4	–	3	–	1	.563	14	–	7	–	2	.652
Iowa State ‍‍‍	3	–	4	–	1	.438	10	–	8	–	1	.553
Oklahoma State ‍‍‍^{y}	3	–	4	–	1	.438	9	–	9	–	3	.500
TCU ‍‍‍^{y}	2	–	5	–	1	.313	12	–	7	–	2	.619
Texas Tech ‍‍‍^{y}	2	–	6	–	0	.250	9	–	9	–	2	.500
Texas ‍‍‍	1	–	6	–	1	.188	8	–	9	–	1	.472
† – Conference champion ‡ – Tournament champion y – Invited to the NCAA tournament As of December 7, 2016; Rankings from NSCAA

2016 Colonial Athletic Association women's soccer standings
	Conf.						Overall
Team	W		L		T	PCT	W		L		T	PCT
Northeastern ‍†‍‡‍^{y}	7	–	2	–	0	.778	14	–	7	–	1	.659
Drexel ‍‍‍	4	–	2	–	3	.611	9	–	7	–	4	.550
James Madison ‍‍‍	5	–	4	–	0	.556	9	–	11	–	0	.450
UNC Wilmington ‍‍‍	4	–	3	–	2	.556	10	–	5	–	4	.632
William & Mary ‍‍‍	4	–	4	–	1	.500	10	–	8	–	2	.550
Charleston ‍‍‍	3	–	3	–	3	.500	10	–	7	–	3	.575
Hofstra ‍‍‍	4	–	5	–	0	.444	10	–	7	–	1	.583
Delaware ‍‍‍	3	–	5	–	1	.389	4	–	13	–	1	.250
Towson ‍‍‍	3	–	6	–	0	.333	6	–	12	–	1	.342
Elon ‍‍‍	2	–	5	–	2	.333	7	–	9	–	3	.447
† – Conference champion ‡ – 2016 CAA Tournament champion y – Invited to the NCAA tournament As of 2016-11-17; Rankings from NSCAA

2016 Conference USA women's soccer standings
	Conf.						Overall
Team	W		L		T	PCT	W		L		T	PCT
North Texas ‍†‍‍	9	–	1	–	0	.900	15	–	5	–	1	.738
Rice ‍‍‍	8	–	2	–	0	.800	11	–	5	–	1	.676
Western Kentucky ‍‍‍	7	–	3	–	0	.700	12	–	6	–	1	.658
Florida Atlantic ‍‍‍	6	–	3	–	1	.650	12	–	8	–	2	.591
Louisiana Tech ‍‍‍	6	–	4	–	0	.600	14	–	6	–	1	.690
Charlotte ‍‍‡‍^{y}	5	–	4	–	1	.550	11	–	9	–	2	.545
UTEP ‍‍‍	5	–	5	–	0	.500	13	–	7	–	2	.636
Old Dominion ‍‍‍	5	–	5	–	0	.500	7	–	12	–	0	.368
Marshall ‍‍‍	4	–	4	–	2	.500	6	–	7	–	4	.471
UTSA ‍‍‍	3	–	7	–	0	.300	7	–	12	–	0	.368
Southern Miss ‍‍‍	2	–	6	–	2	.300	8	–	7	–	2	.529
FIU ‍‍‍	2	–	6	–	2	.300	3	–	11	–	3	.265
Middle Tennessee ‍‍‍	2	–	8	–	0	.200	4	–	12	–	1	.265
UAB ‍‍‍	1	–	7	–	2	.200	4	–	11	–	2	.294
† – Conference champion ‡ – 2016 C-USA Tournament champion y – Invited to the NCAA Tournament; As of 2016-11-17; Rankings from NSCAA

2016 Horizon League women's soccer standings
	Conf.						Overall
Team	W		L		T	PCT	W		L		T	PCT
Milwaukee ‍†‍‍	8	–	1	–	0	.889	13	–	5	–	2	.700
Detroit ‍‍‍	6	–	1	–	2	.778	10	–	7	–	2	.579
Northern Kentucky ‍‍‡‍^{y}	6	–	2	–	1	.722	13	–	7	–	1	.643
Oakland ‍‍‍	5	–	4	–	0	.556	9	–	10	–	1	.475
Valparaiso ‍‍‍	5	–	4	–	0	.556	9	–	10	–	0	.474
Wright State ‍‍‍	4	–	4	–	1	.500	6	–	11	–	2	.368
UIC ‍‍‍	4	–	5	–	0	.444	6	–	10	–	2	.389
Cleveland State ‍‍‍	2	–	7	–	0	.222	5	–	11	–	0	.313
Youngstown State ‍‍‍	1	–	7	–	1	.167	3	–	12	–	2	.235
Green Bay ‍‍‍	1	–	7	–	1	.167	1	–	13	–	2	.125
† – Conference champion ‡ – 2016 Horizon League Tournament champion y – Invited to the NCAA tournament As of 2016-11-17; Rankings from NSCAA

2016 Ivy League women's soccer standings
	Conf.						Overall
Team	W		L		T	PCT	W		L		T	PCT
Harvard ‍†‍‍^{y}	5	–	0	–	2	.857	10	–	4	–	3	.676
Brown ‍‍‍	4	–	1	–	2	.714	9	–	2	–	5	.719
Columbia ‍‍‍	4	–	2	–	1	.643	7	–	6	–	4	.529
Penn ‍‍‍	2	–	2	–	3	.500	9	–	3	–	4	.688
Princeton ‍‍‍	2	–	3	–	2	.429	10	–	4	–	3	.676
Yale ‍‍‍	2	–	4	–	1	.357	6	–	7	–	3	.469
Cornell ‍‍‍	2	–	4	–	1	.357	5	–	9	–	2	.375
Dartmouth ‍‍‍	0	–	5	–	2	.143	7	–	7	–	2	.500
† – Conference champion y – Invited to the NCAA Tournament; As of 2016-11-18; Rankings from NSCAA

2016 Mid-American Conference women's soccer standings
	Conf.						Overall
Team	W		L		T	PCT	W		L		T	PCT
East Division
Kent State ‍‍‡‍^{y}	8	–	1	–	2	.818	15	–	3	–	2	.800
Miami (OH) ‍‍‍	5	–	4	–	2	.545	8	–	9	–	2	.474
Buffalo ‍‍‍	4	–	4	–	3	.500	7	–	8	–	5	.475
Bowling Green ‍‍‍	3	–	7	–	1	.318	8	–	10	–	1	.447
Ohio ‍‍‍	3	–	8	–	0	.273	5	–	12	–	1	.306
Akron ‍‍‍	1	–	6	–	4	.273	4	–	11	–	4	.316
West Division
Ball State ‍†‍‍	9	–	1	–	1	.864	14	–	3	–	3	.775
Central Michigan ‍‍‍	6	–	2	–	3	.682	15	–	3	–	3	.786
Western Michigan ‍‍‍	6	–	4	–	1	.591	13	–	7	–	1	.643
Eastern Michigan ‍‍‍	4	–	5	–	2	.455	6	–	10	–	4	.400
Northern Illinois ‍‍‍	3	–	6	–	2	.364	5	–	11	–	5	.357
Toledo ‍‍‍	3	–	7	–	1	.318	8	–	10	–	1	.447
† – Conference champion ‡ – 2016 MAC Tournament champion y – Invited to the NCAA Tournament; As of 2016-11-18; Rankings from NSCAA

2016 MAAC women's soccer standings
	Conf.						Overall
Team	W		L		T	PCT	W		L		T	PCT
Monmouth ‍†‍‡‍^{y}	9	–	0	–	1	.950	14	–	5	–	2	.714
Quinnipiac ‍‍‍	7	–	4	–	0	.636	12	–	7	–	1	.625
Siena ‍‍‍	7	–	4	–	0	.636	9	–	7	–	3	.553
Rider ‍‍‍	6	–	3	–	1	.650	9	–	6	–	3	.583
Canisius ‍‍‍	6	–	4	–	0	.600	8	–	9	–	0	.471
Marist ‍‍‍	5	–	4	–	1	.550	10	–	9	–	1	.525
Manhattan ‍‍‍	4	–	5	–	1	.450	6	–	10	–	1	.382
Niagara ‍‍‍	4	–	6	–	0	.400	5	–	10	–	1	.344
Fairfield ‍‍‍	2	–	6	–	2	.300	3	–	13	–	2	.222
Iona ‍‍‍	2	–	7	–	1	.250	2	–	14	–	2	.167
St. Peter's ‍‍‍	0	–	9	–	1	.050	1	–	13	–	2	.125
† – Conference champion ‡ – 2016 MAAC Tournament champion y – Invited to the NCAA tournament As of 2016-11-18; Rankings from NSCAA

2016 Missouri Valley Conference women's soccer standings
	Conf.						Overall
Team	W		L		T	PCT	W		L		T	PCT
Illinois State ‍†‍‡‍^{y}	5	–	0	–	1	.917	14	–	6	–	3	.674
Evansville ‍‍‍	3	–	2	–	1	.583	4	–	12	–	3	.289
Northern Iowa ‍‍‍	2	–	2	–	2	.500	8	–	8	–	3	.500
Indiana State ‍‍‍	2	–	3	–	1	.417	7	–	11	–	2	.400
Drake ‍‍‍	2	–	3	–	1	.417	12	–	4	–	3	.711
Loyola ‍‍‍	2	–	4	–	0	.333	5	–	11	–	3	.342
Missouri State ‍‍‍	1	–	3	–	2	.333	5	–	8	–	4	.412
† – Conference champion ‡ – 2016 Missouri Valley Tournament champion y – Invited to the NCAA tournament As of 2016-11-20; Rankings from NSCAA

2016 Mountain West Conference women's soccer standings
	Conf.						Overall
Team	W		L		T	PCT	W		L		T	PCT
UNLV ‍†‍‡‍^{y}	8	–	1	–	2	.818	16	–	4	–	3	.761
San Jose State ‍‍‍	7	–	3	–	1	.682	10	–	6	–	4	.600
San Diego State ‍‍‍	6	–	2	–	3	.682	10	–	7	–	4	.571
Utah State ‍‍‍	7	–	4	–	0	.636	12	–	9	–	0	.571
Wyoming ‍‍‍	6	–	4	–	1	.591	10	–	8	–	2	.550
Boise State ‍‍‍	5	–	3	–	3	.591	6	–	11	–	4	.381
Fresno State ‍‍‍	5	–	5	–	1	.500	10	–	8	–	1	.553
New Mexico ‍‍‍	5	–	5	–	1	.500	9	–	7	–	3	.553
Colorado College ‍‍‍	4	–	7	–	0	.364	8	–	11	–	0	.421
Air Force ‍‍‍	3	–	7	–	1	.318	7	–	9	–	2	.444
Nevada ‍‍‍	2	–	9	–	0	.182	5	–	13	–	0	.278
Colorado State ‍‍‍	1	–	9	–	1	.136	3	–	14	–	2	.211
† – Conference champion ‡ – 2016 MWC Tournament champion y – Invited to the NCAA Tournament; As of 2016-11-17; Rankings from NSCAA

2016 Northeast Conference women's soccer standings
	Conf.						Overall
Team	W		L		T	PCT	W		L		T	PCT
St. Francis ‍†‍‡‍^{y}	6	–	2	–	0	.750	10	–	12	–	0	.455
Central Connecticut ‍†‍‍	6	–	2	–	0	.750	9	–	11	–	1	.452
Sacred Heart ‍‍‍	5	–	1	–	2	.750	8	–	6	–	5	.553
Fairleigh Dickinson ‍‍‍	5	–	2	–	1	.688	7	–	12	–	1	.375
Bryant ‍‍‍	4	–	3	–	1	.563	8	–	9	–	1	.472
Robert Morris ‍‍‍	4	–	4	–	0	.500	6	–	12	–	0	.333
Wagner ‍‍‍	2	–	6	–	0	.250	3	–	15	–	0	.167
Mount St. Mary's ‍‍‍	1	–	7	–	0	.125	5	–	12	–	1	.306
LIU Brooklyn ‍‍‍	1	–	7	–	0	.125	2	–	15	–	0	.118
† – Conference champion ‡ – 2016 NEC Tournament champion y – Invited to the NCAA tournament As of 2016-11-18; Rankings from NSCAA

2016 Ohio Valley Conference women's soccer standings
	Conf.						Overall
Team	W		L		T	PCT	W		L		T	PCT
Murray State ‍†‍‍	7	–	0	–	3	.850	8	–	5	–	4	.588
Eastern Kentucky ‍‍‍	8	–	2	–	0	.800	13	–	5	–	1	.711
Tennessee Tech ‍‍‍	6	–	2	–	2	.700	11	–	6	–	4	.619
SIU Edwardsville ‍‍‡‍^{y}	6	–	3	–	1	.650	10	–	8	–	5	.543
Austin Peay ‍‍‍	5	–	2	–	3	.650	10	–	6	–	4	.600
Belmont ‍‍‍	5	–	4	–	1	.550	6	–	9	–	4	.421
Southeast Missouri State ‍‍‍	3	–	4	–	3	.450	9	–	6	–	4	.579
Morehead State ‍‍‍	3	–	6	–	1	.350	6	–	11	–	2	.368
Jacksonville State ‍‍‍	2	–	8	–	0	.200	5	–	13	–	1	.289
Eastern Illinois ‍‍‍	2	–	8	–	0	.200	5	–	13	–	0	.278
UT Martin ‍‍‍	1	–	9	–	0	.100	4	–	14	–	0	.222
† – Conference champion ‡ – 2016 OVC Tournament champion y – Invited to the NCAA tournament As of 2016-11-20; Rankings from NSCAA

2016 Pac-12 Conference women's soccer standings
	Conf.						Overall
Team	W		L		T	PCT	W		L		T	PCT
No. 6 Stanford ‍†‍‍^{y}	10	–	1	–	0	.909	18	–	2	–	1	.881
No. 1 USC ‍‍‍^{y}	8	–	2	–	1	.773	16	–	4	–	2	.773
No. 23 Colorado ‍‍‍^{y}	8	–	2	–	1	.773	15	–	6	–	1	.705
No. 13 UCLA ‍‍‍^{y}	7	–	3	–	1	.682	15	–	5	–	2	.727
No. 16 Utah ‍‍‍^{y}	6	–	1	–	4	.727	13	–	4	–	5	.705
Cal ‍‍‍^{y}	6	–	3	–	2	.636	13	–	5	–	3	.690
Arizona ‍‍‍	4	–	7	–	0	.364	9	–	9	–	1	.500
Washington State ‍‍‍	3	–	7	–	1	.318	8	–	9	–	2	.474
Oregon State ‍‍‍	3	–	8	–	0	.273	8	–	10	–	2	.450
Oregon ‍‍‍	2	–	8	–	1	.227	8	–	10	–	2	.450
Washington ‍‍‍	2	–	9	–	0	.182	7	–	12	–	1	.375
Arizona State ‍‍‍	1	–	9	–	1	.136	6	–	11	–	2	.368
† – Conference champion y – Invited to the NCAA tournament As of 2016-11-21; Rankings from NSCAA

2016 Patriot League women's soccer standings
	Conf.						Overall
Team	W		L		T	PCT	W		L		T	PCT
Bucknell ‍†‍‡‍^{y}	8	–	1	–	0	.889	16	–	2	–	2	.850
Boston University ‍†‍‍	8	–	1	–	0	.889	9	–	11	–	1	.452
Lehigh ‍‍‍	5	–	3	–	1	.611	11	–	5	–	2	.667
Colgate ‍‍‍	5	–	4	–	0	.556	8	–	8	–	3	.500
Navy ‍‍‍	4	–	4	–	1	.500	9	–	11	–	2	.455
Lafayette ‍‍‍	3	–	5	–	1	.389	7	–	8	–	4	.474
Loyola (MD) ‍‍‍	2	–	4	–	3	.389	6	–	6	–	4	.500
Army ‍‍‍	2	–	5	–	2	.333	4	–	12	–	2	.278
Holy Cross ‍‍‍	2	–	5	–	2	.333	3	–	12	–	2	.235
American ‍‍‍	0	–	7	–	2	.111	1	–	16	–	2	.105
† – Conference champion ‡ – 2016 Patriot League tournament champion y – Invited to the NCAA Tournament; As of 17 Nov 2016; Rankings from NSCAA

2016 SEC women's soccer standings
	Conf.						Overall
Team	W		L		T	PCT	W		L		T	PCT
No. 5 South Carolina ‍†‍‍^{y}	11	–	0	–	0	1.000	21	–	1	–	1	.935
No. 8 Auburn ‍‍‍^{y}	9	–	2	–	0	.818	17	–	6	–	0	.739
No. 19 Arkansas ‍‍‍^{y}	8	–	3	–	0	.727	18	–	5	–	1	.771
No. 10 Florida ‍‍‡‍^{y}	8	–	3	–	0	.727	17	–	5	–	1	.761
Missouri ‍‍‍^{y}	6	–	4	–	1	.591	11	–	7	–	2	.600
Tennessee ‍‍‍	5	–	5	–	1	.500	11	–	9	–	1	.548
Texas A&M ‍‍‍^{y}	5	–	5	–	1	.500	12	–	8	–	2	.591
Vanderbilt ‍‍‍	5	–	5	–	1	.500	9	–	9	–	1	.500
Alabama ‍‍‍	4	–	5	–	2	.455	9	–	8	–	2	.526
Ole Miss ‍‍‍	4	–	7	–	0	.364	9	–	11	–	0	.450
Georgia ‍‍‍	3	–	8	–	0	.273	6	–	11	–	1	.361
LSU ‍‍‍	2	–	8	–	1	.227	7	–	11	–	1	.395
Kentucky ‍‍‍	1	–	7	–	3	.227	5	–	9	–	4	.389
Mississippi State ‍‍‍	1	–	10	–	0	.091	6	–	12	–	0	.333
† – Conference champion ‡ – 2016 SEC Tournament champion y – Invited to the NCAA tournament As of 2016-11-21; Rankings from NSCAA

2016 Southern Conference women's soccer standings
	Conf.						Overall
Team	W		L		T	PCT	W		L		T	PCT
Samford ‍†‍‡‍^{y}	8	–	1	–	0	.889	15	–	4	–	2	.762
East Tennessee State ‍‍‍	6	–	2	–	1	.722	13	–	6	–	2	.667
Furman ‍‍‍	6	–	3	–	0	.667	13	–	5	–	1	.711
Mercer ‍‍‍	6	–	3	–	0	.667	10	–	9	–	1	.525
UNC Greensboro ‍‍‍	4	–	4	–	1	.500	7	–	11	–	2	.400
Chattanooga ‍‍‍	4	–	4	–	1	.500	6	–	11	–	2	.368
VMI ‍‍‍	4	–	5	–	0	.444	8	–	12	–	0	.400
Western Carolina ‍‍‍	4	–	5	–	0	.444	8	–	12	–	0	.400
The Citadel ‍‍‍	1	–	8	–	0	.111	5	–	13	–	0	.278
Wofford ‍‍‍	0	–	8	–	1	.056	2	–	16	–	1	.132
† – Conference champion ‡ – 2016 Southern Tournament champion y – Invited to the NCAA tournament As of 2016-11-14; Rankings from NSCAA

2016 Southland Conference women's soccer standings
	Conf.						Overall
Team	W		L		T	PCT	W		L		T	PCT
Central Arkansas ‍†‍‍	10	–	0	–	1	.955	15	–	4	–	1	.775
Stephen F. Austin ‍‍‍	9	–	2	–	0	.818	13	–	5	–	0	.722
Abilene Christian* ‍‍‍	8	–	2	–	1	.773	9	–	8	–	2	.526
Northwestern State ‍‍‍	7	–	3	–	1	.682	10	–	8	–	1	.553
Houston Baptist ‍‍‡‍^{y}	5	–	5	–	1	.500	10	–	11	–	1	.477
McNeese State ‍‍‍	4	–	6	–	1	.409	9	–	10	–	1	.475
Southeastern Louisiana ‍‍‍	4	–	6	–	1	.409	7	–	11	–	2	.400
Nicholls State ‍‍‍	3	–	6	–	2	.364	6	–	8	–	2	.438
Incarnate Word* ‍‍‍	3	–	7	–	1	.318	4	–	11	–	2	.294
Texas A&M–Corpus Christi ‍‍‍	3	–	7	–	1	.318	3	–	14	–	1	.194
Sam Houston State ‍‍‍	2	–	8	–	1	.227	2	–	16	–	1	.132
Lamar ‍‍‍	1	–	7	–	3	.227	2	–	14	–	3	.184
† – Conference champion ‡ – 2016 Southland Tournament champion y – Invited to the NCAA Tournament * – Abilene Christian and Incarnate Word ineligible for postseason (D2 to D1 regulations); As of 2016-11-14; Rankings from NSCAA

2016 SWAC women's soccer standings
	Conf.						Overall
Team	W		L		T	PCT	W		L		T	PCT
Howard ‍†‍‍	9	–	0	–	1	.950	13	–	4	–	3	.725
Texas Southern ‍‍‍	8	–	1	–	1	.850	11	–	7	–	1	.605
Alabama State ‍‍‡‍^{y}	7	–	2	–	1	.750	11	–	10	–	1	.523
Arkansas–Pine Bluff ‍‍‍	7	–	2	–	1	.750	8	–	8	–	2	.500
Mississippi Valley State ‍‍‍	5	–	3	–	2	.600	5	–	9	–	2	.375
Jackson State ‍‍‍	4	–	6	–	1	.409	4	–	13	–	1	.250
Prairie View A&M ‍‍‍	3	–	5	–	1	.389	3	–	12	–	1	.219
Southern ‍‍‍	3	–	8	–	0	.273	3	–	15	–	0	.167
Alabama A&M ‍‍‍	2	–	7	–	0	.222	3	–	15	–	0	.167
Alcorn State ‍‍‍	2	–	8	–	0	.200	2	–	10	–	0	.167
Grambling State ‍‍‍	1	–	9	–	0	.100	1	–	11	–	0	.083
† – Conference champion ‡ – 2016 SWAC Tournament champion y – Invited to the NCAA tournament As of 2016-11-17; Rankings from NSCAA

2016 Sun Belt Conference women's soccer standings
	Conf.						Overall
Team	W		L		T	PCT	W		L		T	PCT
South Alabama ‍†‍‡‍^{y}	7	–	3	–	0	.700	15	–	6	–	1	.705
Coastal Carolina ‍‍‍	6	–	2	–	2	.700	12	–	6	–	3	.643
Little Rock ‍‍‍	6	–	3	–	1	.650	12	–	8	–	1	.595
Appalachian State ‍‍‍	4	–	4	–	2	.500	10	–	8	–	2	.550
Louisiana–Lafayette ‍‍‍	4	–	4	–	2	.500	8	–	9	–	2	.474
Louisiana–Monroe ‍‍‍	4	–	4	–	2	.500	7	–	9	–	3	.447
Arkansas State ‍‍‍	4	–	5	–	1	.450	6	–	8	–	3	.441
Troy ‍‍‍	3	–	5	–	2	.400	7	–	10	–	3	.425
Texas State ‍‍‍	3	–	5	–	2	.400	6	–	9	–	3	.417
Georgia State ‍‍‍	2	–	4	–	4	.400	5	–	6	–	6	.471
Georgia Southern ‍‍‍	3	–	7	–	0	.300	6	–	10	–	1	.382
† – Conference champion ‡ – 2016 Sun Belt Tournament champion y – Invited to the NCAA tournament As of 2016-11-14; Rankings from NSCAA

2016 Summit League women's soccer standings
	Conf.						Overall
Team	W		L		T	PCT	W		L		T	PCT
North Dakota State ‍†‍‍	5	–	2	–	1	.688	10	–	8	–	1	.553
Denver ‍†‍‍	5	–	2	–	1	.688	8	–	9	–	2	.474
Oral Roberts ‍‍‍	5	–	3	–	0	.625	11	–	9	–	2	.545
South Dakota State ‍‍‡‍^{y}	5	–	3	–	0	.625	10	–	7	–	4	.571
South Dakota ‍‍‍	4	–	4	–	0	.500	5	–	13	–	1	.289
IUPUI ‍‍‍	3	–	3	–	2	.500	9	–	7	–	3	.553
Omaha ‍‍‍	3	–	4	–	1	.438	5	–	11	–	3	.342
Western Illinois ‍‍‍	2	–	5	–	1	.313	4	–	11	–	2	.294
Fort Wayne ‍‍‍	0	–	6	–	2	.125	3	–	14	–	2	.211
† – Conference champion ‡ – 2016 Summit League Tournament champion y – Invited to the NCAA tournament As of 2016-11-14; Rankings from NSCAA

2016 West Coast Conference women's soccer standings
	Conf.						Overall
Team	W		L		T	PCT	W		L		T	PCT
No. 22 Pepperdine ‍†‍‍^{y}	7	–	1	–	1	.833	12	–	5	–	4	.667
No. 9 BYU ‍†‍‍^{y}	7	–	1	–	1	.833	18	–	3	–	1	.841
No. 17 Santa Clara ‍‍‍^{y}	6	–	2	–	1	.722	11	–	6	–	4	.619
Loyola Marymount ‍‍‍	6	–	3	–	0	.667	11	–	5	–	3	.658
San Diego ‍‍‍	5	–	4	–	0	.556	10	–	8	–	1	.553
Portland ‍‍‍	3	–	5	–	1	.389	9	–	7	–	3	.553
San Francisco ‍‍‍	3	–	6	–	0	.333	7	–	12	–	0	.368
Saint Mary's ‍‍‍	3	–	6	–	0	.333	5	–	13	–	2	.300
Gonzaga ‍‍‍	2	–	7	–	0	.222	6	–	10	–	2	.389
Pacific ‍‍‍	1	–	8	–	0	.111	1	–	15	–	1	.088
† – Conference champion y – Invited to the NCAA tournament As of 2016-12-14; Rankings from NSCAA

2016 WAC women's soccer standings
	Conf.						Overall
Team	W		L		T	PCT	W		L		T	PCT
Seattle ‍†‍‡‍^{y}	7	–	0	–	0	1.000	14	–	6	–	1	.690
Cal State Bakersfield ‍‍‍	4	–	2	–	1	.643	8	–	10	–	2	.450
UMKC ‍‍‍	3	–	2	–	2	.571	8	–	10	–	4	.455
Grand Canyon* ‍‍‍	3	–	2	–	2	.571	7	–	9	–	2	.444
Utah Valley ‍‍‍	3	–	3	–	1	.500	10	–	8	–	2	.550
New Mexico State ‍‍‍	2	–	3	–	2	.429	5	–	13	–	2	.300
Texas–Rio Grande Valley ‍‍‍	2	–	5	–	0	.286	10	–	8	–	1	.553
Chicago State ‍‍‍	0	–	7	–	0	.000	1	–	16	–	0	.059
† – Conference champion ‡ – 2016 WAC Tournament champion y – Invited to the NCAA tournament * – Grand Canyon ineligible for postseason (D2 to D1 regulations); As of 2016-11-14; Rankings from NSCAA

=== Conference winners and tournaments ===
Conference	Regular Season Champion(s)	Conference Player(s) of the Year	Conference Coach(es) of the Year	Conference Tournament	Tournament Venue (City)	Tournament Winner
America East	Albany; Hartford	B. Murphy, UNH (Off); C. Smallfield, Hartford (Def)	Brendan Faherty, SB	2016 Tournament	Campus Sites (Higher Seed)	Albany
American	UConn	S. Ribeiro, UConn (Off); S. Fredriksson, UCF (Co-Def); T. Patterson, UConn (Co-Def)	Len Tsantiris, UConn; Chris Petrucelli, SMU	2016 Tournament	Morrone Stadium (Storrs, CT)	UConn
Atlantic 10	St. Joseph's	D. Mills, Saint Joseph’s (Off); K. Bright, St. Louis (Def)	Jess Manella, Saint Joe’s	2016 Tournament	URI Complex (Kingston, RI)	Dayton
ACC	Clemson; Notre Dame	A. Shaffer, Virginia (Off); C. Gibbons, Duke (Def)	Eddie Radwanski, Clem.	2016 Tournament	Quarterfinals: Campus Sites; Semifinals & Final: MUSC Health Stadium (Charleston)	Florida State
Atlantic Sun	FGCU	T. Tindell, FGCU (Off); N. Rawlins, Lipscomb (Def)	Kevin O'Brien, Lipscomb	2016 Tournament	First Round: Campus Sites; Semifinals & Final: FGCU Complex (Fort Myers, FL)	FGCU
Big 12	West Virginia	M. Abam, WVU (Co-Off); C. Dike, OK State (Co-Off); K. Buchanan, WVU (Def)	Nikki Izzo-Brown, WVU	2016 Tournament	Swope Soccer Village (Kansas City)	West Virginia
Big East	DePaul; Marquette	A. Reed, DePaul (Off); M. Proffitt, Marquette (Def)	Markus Roeders, Marq.	2016 Tournament	First Round: Campus Sites; Semifinals & Final: Shaw Field (Washington, D.C.)	Georgetown
Big Sky	Idaho	C. Williams, EWU (Off); R. Leonard, Sac. St. (Def)	Randy Dedinim, Sac. St.	2016 Tournament	EWU Complex (Cheney, WA)	Eastern Washington
Big South	High Point	K. Perrell, High Point (Off); H. Van Noord, Liberty (Def)	Marty Beall, High Point	2016 Tournament	Quarterfinals: Campus Sites; Semifinals & Final: Bryan Park (Greensboro, NC)	Liberty
Big Ten	Minnesota; Northwestern; Penn State	S. Kolander, Minnesota (Off); R. Beal, Minnesota (Def)	Stefanie Golan, Minn.	2016 Tournament	Quarterfinals: Campus Sites; Semifinals & Final: Robbie Stadium (St. Paul, MN)	Minnesota
Big West	Cal St Northridge	A. Gonzales, LBSU (Off); N. Thompson, CSUN (Def)	Keith West, CSUN	2016 Tournament	George Allen Field (Long Beach, CA)	Long Beach St.
CAA	Northeastern	A. Herndon, JMU (Off); C. Ogunsami, Drexel (Co-Def); C. Logsdon, W&M (Co-Def)	Ray Goon, Drexel	2016 Tournament	Quarterfinals: Campus Sites; Semifinals & Final: Parsons Field (Brookline, MA)	Northeastern
C-USA	North Texas	M. Thomas, Charlotte (Off); J. Fichera, Rice (Def)	Jason Neidell, WKU	2016 Tournament	Transamerica Field (Charlotte, NC)	Charlotte
Horizon	Milwaukee	M. Hamblin, NKU (Off); R. DeLuca, Det. Mercy (Def)	Troy Fabiano, Milw.	2016 Tournament	Quarterfinals: Campus Sites; Semifinals & Final: Engelmann Stadium (Milwaukee, WI)	Northern Kentucky
Ivy	Harvard	M. Purce, Harvard (Off); C. Etzel, Brown (Def)	Chris Hamblin, Harvard	No Tournament		
MAAC	Monmouth	A. McTamney, Monmouth (Off); T. Sobierjaski, Siena (Def)	Krissy Turner, Mon.	2016 Tournament	First Round: Campus Sites; Semifinals & Final: Hesse Field (West Long Branch, NJ)	Monmouth
MAC	Ball State	J. Hellstrom, Kent St. (Off); L. White, Ball St. (Def)	Rob Marinaro, Kent St.	2016 Tournament	Quarterfinals: Campus Sites; Semifinals & Final: Dix Stadium (Kent, OH)	Kent State
Missouri Valley	Illinois State	L. Koehl, Illinois St. (Off); P. Jarsombeck, Ill. St. (Def)	Eric Golz, Illinois St.	2016 Tournament	First Round: Campus Sites; Semifinals & Final: Adelaide Street Field (Normal, IL)	Illinois State
Mountain West	UNLV	L. Sender, UNLV (Off); C. Akubuilo, UNLV (Def)	Chris Shaw, UNLV	2016 Tournament	SDSU Sports Deck (San Diego)	UNLV
Northeast	Central Connecticut; Saint Francis (PA)	G. Morales, SFPA (Off); J. Cafferky, CCSU (Def)	Brenda van Stralen, SFU	2016 Tournament	Stokes Soccerplex (Loretto, PA)	Saint Francis (PA)
Ohio Valley	Murray State	H. Withers, Murray St. (Off); K. Naerdemann, TN Tech (Def)	Nick Flohre, EKU	2016 Tournament	First Round: Campus Sites; Semifinals & Final: Cutchin Field (Murray, KY)	SIU Edwardsville
Pac-12	Stanford	A. Sullivan, Stanford (Off); M. Freeman, USC (Def)	Paul Ratcliffe, Stanford	No Tournament		
Patriot	Boston U Bucknell	K. Ham, Bucknell (Off); R. Bloznalis, Boston U (Def)	Kelly Cook, Bucknell	2016 Tournament	Quarterfinals: Campus Sites; Semifinals & Final: Emmitt Field (Lewisburg, PA)	Bucknell
SEC	South Carolina	S. McCaskill, S. Carolina (Off); K. Kurtz, S. Carolina (Def)	Shelley Smith, SC	2016 Tournament	Orange Beach Sportsplex (Orange Beach, AL)	Florida
SoCon	Samford	J. Seoposenwe, Samford (Off); O. Cole, Samford (Def)	Todd Yelton, Samford	2016 Tournament	First Rd. & Quarters: Campus Sites; Semifinals & Final: Taylor Stadium (Johnson City, TN)	Samford
Southland	Cent. Arkansas	C. Bassett, Cent. Arkansas (Off); K. Roberts, Abilene Chr. (Def)	Jeremy Bishop, C. Ark.	2016 Tournament	Dugan Stadium (Corpus Christi, TX)	Houston Baptist
The Summit	Denver; North Dakota St.	L. Jones, Oral Roberts (Off); M. Bothner, Denver (Def)	Roger Bush, ORU	2016 Tournament	Dacotah Field (Fargo, ND)	South Dakota St.
Sun Belt	South Alabama	J. Cline, App. State (Off); J. Purfield, S. Alabama (Def)	Keyton Wheelock, ULM	2016 Tournament	Foley Sports Complex (Foley, AL)	South Alabama
SWAC	Howard	A. Lewis, Alabama St. (Co-Off); L. Issaka, Miss. Vall. St. (Co-Off); K. Hamilton, Howard (Def)	Brent Leiba, Howard	2016 Tournament	PVAM Stadium (Prairie View, TX)	Alabama State
WCC	BYU; Pepperdine	M. Vasconcelos, BYU (Off); T. Isom, BYU (Def)	Tim Ward, Pepperdine	No Tournament		
WAC	Seattle	B. Hooks, Seattle (Off); S. Spiekerman, Seattle (Def)	Gary Curneen, CSUB	2016 Tournament	Durwood Soccer Stadium (Kansas City)	Seattle

== See also ==
- College soccer
- List of NCAA Division I women's soccer programs
- 2016 in American soccer
- 2016 NCAA Division I Women's Soccer Tournament
- 2016 NCAA Division I men's soccer season
