= SWAC women's soccer tournament =

- Conference soccer championship
- Sport: College soccer
- Conference: SWAC
- Number of teams: 8
- Format: Single-elimination
- Current stadium: PVA&M Soccer Stadium
- Current location: Prairie View, Texas
- Played: 2003–present
- Last contest: 2026
- Current champion: Jackson State (4th title)
- Most championships: Grambling State; Jackson State (4 titles)
- TV partner: SWAC Digital Network
- Official website: swac.org/wsoc

The SWAC women's soccer tournament is the conference championship tournament in college soccer for the Southwestern Athletic Conference. The tournament has been held every year since 2003. It is a single-elimination tournament with seeding based on conference records. The winner, declared conference champion, receives the conference's automatic bid to the NCAA Division I women's soccer championship.

Grambling State and Jackson State are the most winning teams of the competition with 4 titles each.

== Champions ==
Key

- (1) – Title number
- **Bold** – Winning team **won regular season**
- (a.e.t.) – Match went to extra time
- (p) – Match decided by a penalty shootout after extra time
- – Winning team also won regular season

=== Finals ===
Ed.	Year	Champion	Score	Runner-up	Venue	City	MVP	Ref.
1	2003	**Alabama A&M** (1)	2–0	Grambling State	Bulldog Field	Huntsville, AL		
2	2004	**Grambling State** (1)	1–0	Alabama A&M	Bulldog Field	Huntsville, AL		
3	2005	Mississippi Valley State (1)	2–1	Jackson State	GSU Soccer Complex	Grambling, LA		
4	2006	**Grambling State** (2)	2–0	Mississippi Valley State	Bulldog Field	Huntsville, AL		
5	2007	Alabama A&M (2)	2–1	Mississippi Valley State	Cowgirl Field	Lake Charles, LA		
6	2008	**Mississippi Valley State** (2)	2–1	Jackson State	Mississippi Soccer Complex	Itta Bena, MS		
7	2009	Arkansas–Pine Bluff (1)	1–0	Prairie View A&M	Mississippi Soccer Complex	Itta Bena, MS		
8	2010	**Jackson State** (1)	2–0	Mississippi Valley State	Pumphrey Soccer Complex	Pine Bluff, AR		
9	2011	Arkansas–Pine Bluff (2)	3–0	Mississippi Valley State	Johnny Downs Complex	Alexandria, LA		
10	2012	Mississippi Valley State (3)	2–0	Jackson State	Johnny Downs Complex	Alexandria, LA	Shanesse Spratt, Mississippi Valley State	
11	2013	Jackson State (2)	1–0	Alabama State	Houston Sports Park	Houston, TX		
12	2014	**Howard** (1)	2–1	Prairie View A&M	John Hunt Park	Huntsville, AL	Nikanya Clark, Howard	
13	2015	Howard (2)	1–2	Alabama State	John Hunt Park	Huntsville, AL	Dytria Ruddy, Howard	
14	2016	Alabama State (1)	2–1	Arkansas–Pine Bluff	PVA&M Soccer Stadium	Prairie View, TX		
15	2017	**Alabama State** (2)	0–0 (4–2 p)	Grambling State	PVA&M Soccer Stadium	Prairie View, TX	Gianna Guyot, Alabama State	
16	2018	Howard (3)	1–0	Grambling State	PVA&M Soccer Stadium	Prairie View, TX	Jordan Taylor, Howard	
17	2019	Prairie View A&M (1)	1–0	Howard	PVA&M Soccer Stadium	Prairie View, TX	Kalia Brown, Prairie View A&M	
18	2020	**Alabama State** (3)	2–2 (3–1 p)	Grambling State	PVA&M Soccer Stadium	Prairie View, TX	McKenna Wiscombe, Alabama State	
19	2021	**Prairie View A&M** (2)	1–1 (3–2 p)	Grambling State	PVA&M Soccer Stadium	Prairie View, TX	Savannah Powell, Prairie View A&M	
20	2022	**Jackson State** (3)	4–2 (a.e.t.)	Grambling State	PVA&M Soccer Stadium	Prairie View, TX	Jordan Smith, Jackson State	
21	2023	**Grambling State** (3)	2–1	Jackson State	PVA&M Soccer Stadium	Prairie View, TX	Sophia Lezizidis, Grambling State	
22	2024	Southern (1)	1–0	Texas Southern	PVA&M Soccer Stadium	Prairie View, TX	Alyssa Romero, Southern	
23	2025	Grambling State (4)	2–1	Jackson State	PVA&M Soccer Stadium	Prairie View, TX	Liana Bryant, Grambling State	
24	2026	**Jackson State** (4)	1–0	Prairie View A&M	PVA&M Soccer Stadium	Prairie View, TX	Kianah Farmer, Jackson State	

=== By school ===
As of 2026 tournament

School	Finals	Titles	Title Years
Alabama A&M	3	2	2003, 2007
Alabama State	5	3	2016, 2017, 2020
Arkansas–Pine Bluff	3	2	2009, 2011
Grambling State	10	4	2004, 2006, 2023, 2025
Howard	4	3	2014, 2015, 2018
Jackson State	9	4	2010, 2013, 2022, 2026
Mississippi Valley State	7	3	2005, 2008, 2012
Prairie View A&M	5	2	2019, 2021
Texas Southern	1	0	—
Southern	1	1	2024

Notes

Teams in Italics no longer sponsor women's soccer in the SWAC.
