= Missouri Valley Conference women's soccer tournament =

Collegiate soccer tournament

- NCAA Tournament Qualifier
- Sport: College soccer
- Conference: Missouri Valley Conference
- Number of teams: 8
- Format: Single-elimination
- Current stadium: Allison South Stadium
- Current location: Springfield, Missouri
- Played: 1996–present
- Last contest: 2026
- Current champion: Southern Illinois (1st title)
- Most championships: Evansville; Illinois State (7 titles each)
- TV partner: ESPN+
- Official website: mvc-sports.com/wsoc

The Missouri Valley Conference women's soccer tournament is the conference championship tournament in soccer for the Missouri Valley Conference (MVC). The tournament has been held every year since the MVC began women's soccer competition in 1996. It is a single-elimination tournament and seeding is based on regular season conference records. The winner, declared conference champion, receives the conference's automatic bid to the NCAA Division I women's soccer championship.

== Champions ==
=== Key ===
Key

- (1) — Title number
- a.e.t. — Match went to extra time
- p – Match decided by a penalty shootout after extra time
- – Winning team also won regular season

=== By Year ===
Ed.	Year	Champion	Score	Runner-up	Venue / city	MVP	Ref.
1	1996	Evansville (1)	5–0	Creighton	Black Beauty Field • Evansville, IN	Sally Meek, Evansville	
2	1997	Evansville (2)	2–2 (5–4 p)	Eastern Illinois	Cooper Park • Springfield, MO	Laura Poland, Evansville	
3	1998	Evansville (3)	2–1	Illinois State	Black Beauty Field • Evansville, IN	Kari Sunderhaus, Evansville	
4	1999	Evansville (4)	3–2 (a.e.t.)	Missouri State	Cooper Complex • Springfield, MO	Tina Allwardt, Evansville	
5	2000	Missouri State (1)	1–0	Evansville	SportPort • Maryland Heights, MO	Jennifer Grocki, Missouri State	
6	2001	Evansville (5)	2–1	Missouri State	SportPort • Maryland Heights, MO	Jessica Schwartz, Evansville	
7	2002	Creighton (1)	1–0 (a.e.t.)	Illinois State	SportPort • Maryland Heights, MO	Kelan Brill, Creighton	
8	2003	Illinois State (1)	0–0 (5–4 p)	Creighton	SportPort • Maryland Heights, MO	Chrystal Johnston, Illinois State	
9	2004	Creighton (2)	3–1	Drake	Cownie Complex • Des Moines, IA	Katie Brennan, Creighton	
10	2005	Creighton (3)	1–0	Drake	Morrison Stadium • Omaha, NE	Marcy Gans, Creighton	
11	2006	Drake (1)	1–0 (a.e.t.)	Evansville	Morrison Stadium • Omaha, NE	Melissa Nelson, Drake	
12	2007	Creighton (4)	0–0 (5–4 p)	Illinois State	Black Beauty Field • Evansville, IN	Marcy Gans, Creighton	
13	2008	Evansville (6)	2–0	Indiana State	Morrison Stadium • Omaha, NE	Kayla Lambert, Evansville	
14	2009	Illinois State (2)	1–0	Creighton	Morrison Stadium • Omaha, NE	Jessica Carlson, Illinois State	
15	2010	Creighton (5)	2–1 (a.e.t.)	Missouri State	Morrison Stadium • Omaha, NE	Lauren Cingoranelli, Creighton	
16	2011	Illinois State (3)	5–0	Missouri State	Cooper Field • Springfield, MI	Kyla Cross, Illinois State	
17	2012	Illinois State (4)	5–1	Indiana State	Morrison Stadium • Omaha, NE	Rachel Tejada, Illinois State	
18	2013	Illinois State (5)	5–0	Indiana State	McCutchan Stadium • Evansville, IN	Hannah Leinert, Illinois State	
19	2014	Illinois State (6)	2–1	Evansville	Adelaide Street Field • Normal, IL	Rachel Tejada, Illinois State	
20	2015	Evansville (7)	0–0 (5–3 p)	Loyola Chicago	McCutchan Stadium • Evansville, IN	Whitney Biggs, Evansville	
21	2016	Illinois State (7)	2–1	Evansville	Adelaide Street Field • Normal, IL	Lauren Koehl, Illinois State	
22	2017	Missouri State (2)	1–0	Northern Iowa	Allison South Stadium • Springfield, MO	Brooke Zimmerman, Missouri State	
23	2018	Loyola Chicago (1)	3–2	Drake	Loyola Soccer Park • Chicago, IL	Jenna Szczesny, Loyola Chicago	
24	2019	Loyola Chicago (2)	2–0	Illinois State	Allison South Stadium • Springfield, MO	Sienna Cruz, Loyola Chicago	
25	2020	Loyola Chicago (3)	1–0	Valparaiso	Loyola Soccer Park • Chicago, IL	Megan Nemec, Loyola Chicago	
26	2021	Loyola Chicago (4)	4–0	Evansville	Loyola Soccer Park • Chicago, IL	Amanda Cassidy, Loyola Chicago	
27	2022	Missouri State (3)	1–0	Murray State	Brown Field • Valparaiso, IN	Kaeli Benedict, Missouri State	
28	2023	Valparaiso (1)	1–0	Drake	Cownie Complex • Des Moines, IA	Nikki Coryell, Valparaiso	
29	2024	Missouri State (4)	4–0	Drake	Allison South Stadium • Springfield, MO	Grace O'Keefe, Missouri State	
30	2025	UIC (1)	0–0 (2–1 p)	Illinois State	Adelaide Street Field • Normal, IL	Sara Sanabria, UIC	
31	2026	Southern Illinois (1)	1–0	Drake	Cownie Complex • Des Moines, IA	Guliana Balistreri, Southern Illinois	

=== By school ===
As of 2026 Tournament

School	Apps.	W	L	T	Pct.	Finals	Titles	Winning years
Belmont	4	1	4	0	.200	0	0	—
Creighton	17	20	10	4	.647	8	5	2002, 2004, 2005, 2007, 2010
Drake	23	13	21	3	.392	7	1	2006
Drury	4	0	4	0	.000	0	0	—
Eastern Illinois	3	2	2	1	.500	1	0	—
Evansville	25	21	16	8	.556	12	7	1996, 1997, 1998, 1999, 2001, 2008, 2015
Illinois State	27	23	14	9	.598	12	7	2003, 2009, 2011, 2012, 2013, 2014, 2016
Indiana State	16	6	15	3	.313	3	0	—
Little Rock	1	0	1	0	.000	0	0	—
Loyola Chicago	8	11	2	3	.781	5	4	2018, 2019, 2020, 2021
Missouri State	25	20	18	6	.523	8	4	2000, 2017, 2022, 2024
Murray State	4	5	2	2	.667	1	0	—
Northern Iowa	17	6	16	3	.300	0	0	—
Southern Illinois	3	2	2	0	.500	1	1	2026
UIC	4	2	2	4	.500	1	1	2025
Valparaiso	9	5	7	1	.423	2	1	2023

Teams in Italics no longer sponsor women's soccer in the Missouri Valley.
