= 2016 Big West Conference women's soccer tournament =

Women's Soccer Tournament

- Classification: Division I
- Teams: 4
- Matches: 3
- Site: George Allen Field; Long Beach, California
- Champions: Long Beach State (3rd title)
- Winning coach: Mauricio Ingrassia (3rd title)

2016 Big West Conference women's soccer standings
	Conf.						Overall
Team	W		L		T	PCT	W		L		T	PCT
Cal State Northridge ‍†‍‍	6	–	1	–	1	.813	11	–	5	–	5	.643
UC Irvine ‍‍‍	5	–	2	–	1	.688	13	–	7	–	2	.636
Long Beach State ‍‍‡‍^{y}	4	–	1	–	3	.688	10	–	7	–	4	.571
Cal State Fullerton ‍‍‍	5	–	3	–	0	.625	8	–	10	–	1	.447
UC Davis ‍‍‍	3	–	3	–	2	.500	7	–	8	–	4	.474
UC Santa Barbara ‍‍‍	2	–	5	–	1	.313	11	–	6	–	2	.632
Hawaii ‍‍‍	2	–	5	–	1	.313	9	–	6	–	2	.588
UC Riverside ‍‍‍	2	–	5	–	1	.313	5	–	10	–	4	.368
Cal Poly ‍‍‍	1	–	5	–	2	.250	6	–	10	–	3	.395
† – Conference champion ‡ – 2016 Big West Tournament champion y – Invited to the NCAA Tournament; As of 2016-11-17; Rankings from NSCAA

The 2016 Big West Conference women's soccer tournament is the postseason women's soccer tournament for the Big West Conference held from November 3 to 6, 2016. The three match tournament was held at George Allen Field in Long Beach, California. The four team single-elimination tournament consisted of two rounds based on seeding from regular season conference play. The Cal State Fullerton Titans were the three-time defending tournament champions after defeating the Long Beach State 49ers 1–0 in the championship match in 2015.

== Bracket ==
Semifinals; Thursday, November 3
1	Cal State Northridge	0
4	Long Beach State	1
2	UC Irvine	1 (4)
3	Cal State Fullerton	1 (2)

Final; Sunday, November 6
4	Long Beach State	3
2	UC Irvine	0

== Schedule ==
=== Semifinals ===
November 3, 2016	#1 Cal State Northridge	0–1	#4 Long Beach State	Long Beach, California
5:00 p.m. PST		Report	Ashley Gonzales 13'	Stadium: George Allen Field; Referee: Christopher Calderon

November 3, 2016	#2 UC Irvine	1–1 (a.e.t.) (4–2 p)	#3 Cal State Fullerton	Long Beach, California
7:30 p.m. PST	Kelsey Texeira 39'	Report	Sarah Fajnor 29'	Stadium: George Allen Field; Referee: Hector Perez
	Penalties
	Sammie James (penalty scored); Kelsey Texeira (penalty missed); Andrea Mensen (penalty scored); Brittany Nguyen (penalty scored); Grayson Galbraith (penalty scored)		(penalty scored) Connie Caliz; (penalty missed) Devin Spolsdoff; (penalty scored) Tala Haddad; (penalty missed) Maribell Morales

=== Final ===
November 6, 2016	#4 Long Beach State	3–0	#2 UC Irvine	Long Beach, California
1:00 p.m. PST	Kaitlin Fregulia 5'; Jessica Vincent 24'; Ashley Gonzales 26' (pen.)	Report		Stadium: George Allen Field; Referee: Bernhardd Hosu

== See also ==
- Big West Conference
- 2016 Big West Conference women's soccer season
- 2016 NCAA Division I women's soccer season
- 2016 NCAA Division I Women's Soccer Tournament
