= Ohio Valley Conference women's soccer tournament =

- Sport: College soccer
- Conference: Ohio Valley Conference
- Number of teams: 8
- Format: Single-elimination
- Current stadium: Campus sites
- Played: 1999–present
- Last contest: 2025
- Current champion: UT Martin (3rd title)
- Most championships: Eastern Illinois; SIU Edwardsville (5 titles each)
- TV partner: ESPN+
- Official website: ovcsports.com/womens-soccer

The Ohio Valley Conference women's soccer tournament is the conference championship tournament in soccer for the Ohio Valley Conference. In the current format, eight teams compete in the single-elimination tournament, with all games being played at the home field of the higher seed, with seeding based on regular season conference records. The tournament expanded from six teams to its current eight in 2017. The winner, declared conference champion, receives the conference's automatic bid to the NCAA Division I women's soccer championship.

== Champions ==
=== Key ===
Key

- (1) — Title number
- a.e.t. — Match went to extra time
- p – Match decided by a penalty shootout after extra time
- – Winning team also won regular season

=== By Year ===
Ed.	Year	Champion	Score	Runner-up	Venue / city	MVP	Ref.
1	1999	Eastern Illinois (1)	3–1	Tennessee Tech	Lakeside Soccer Field • Charleston, Illinois	Carole Griggs, Eastern Illinois	
2	2000	Tennessee Tech (1)	1–0 (a.e.t.)	Eastern Illinois	Lakeside Soccer Field • Charleston, Illinois	Julia Doyle, Tennessee Tech	
3	2001	Eastern Illinois (2)	1–0	Southeast Missouri State	Houck Stadium • Cape Girardeau, Missouri	Devon Bissell, Eastern Illinois	
4	2002	Eastern Illinois (3)	2–2 (p)	Southeast Missouri State	Houck Stadium • Cape Girardeau, Missouri	Teri LaRoche, Eastern Illinois	
5	2003	Eastern Illinois (4)	1–1 (p)	Samford	Samford Track and Soccer Stadium • Homewood, Alabama	Beth Liesin, Eastern Illinois	
6	2004	Eastern Illinois (5)	3–2	Samford	Samford Track and Soccer Stadium • Homewood, Alabama	Audra Frericks, Eastern Illinois	
7	2005	Samford (1)	2–0	Eastern Illinois	Lakeside Soccer Field • Charleston, Illinois	Sharon Young, Samford	
8	2006	Southeast Missouri State (1)	2–0	Morehead State	Samford Track and Soccer Stadium • Homewood, Alabama	Casey Kraft, Southeast Missouri State	
9	2007	Southeast Missouri State (2)	1–1 (p)	Samford	Houck Stadium • Cape Girardeau, Missouri	Ashley Runion, Southeast Missouri State	
10	2008	Morehead State (1)	1–0	UT Martin	Cutchin Field • Murray, Kentucky	Lily Meisner, Morehead State	
11	2009	Murray State (1)	4–0	Tennessee Tech	MSU Soccer Field • Morehead, Kentucky	Sophie Hargreaves	
12	2010	Morehead State (2)	2–1	Austin Peay	MSU Soccer Field • Morehead, Kentucky	Giuleana Lopez, Morehead State	
13	2011	UT Martin (1)	2–1	Morehead State	Houck Stadium • Cape Girardeau, Missouri	Lucy Pater, UT Martin	
14	2012	UT Martin (2)	2–0	Austin Peay	Skyhawk Soccer Field • Martin, Tennessee	Mariah Klenke, UT Martin	
15	2013	Morehead State (3)	1–0	UT Martin	Skyhawk Soccer Field • Martin, Tennessee	Lindsey Oettle, Morehead State	
16	2014	SIU Edwardsville (1)	3–2	Jacksonville State	Houck Stadium • Cape Girardeau, Missouri	Michelle Auer, SIU Edwardsville	
17	2015	Murray State (2)	1–0 (a.e.t.)	Southeast Missouri State	MSU Soccer Field • Morehead, Kentucky	Taylor Richerson, Murray State	
18	2016	SIU Edwardsville (2)	1–0	Eastern Kentucky	MSU Soccer Field • Morehead, Kentucky	Caroline Hoefert, SIU Edwardsville	
19	2017	Murray State (3)	1–0 (a.e.t.)	Eastern Kentucky	MSU Soccer Field • Morehead, Kentucky	Miyah Watford, Murray State	
20	2018	Murray State (4)	2–1	UT Martin	Skyhawk Soccer Field • Martin, Tennessee	Alex Steigerwald, Murray State	
21	2019	Belmont (1)	2–2 (3–2 p)	SIU Edwardsville	Houck Stadium • Cape Girardeau, Missouri	Julie Garst, Belmont	
22	2020	SIU Edwardsville (3)	2–1 (a.e.t.)	Southeast Missouri State	Skyhawk Soccer Field • Martin, Tennessee	Maria Haro, SIU Edwardsville	
23	2021	SIU Edwardsville (4)	1–0 (a.e.t.)	UT Martin	Skyhawk Soccer Field • Martin, Tennessee	Lydia Harris, SIU Edwardsville	
24	2022	SIU Edwardsville (5)	1–0	Tennessee Tech	Tech Soccer Field • Cookeville, Tennessee	Sidney Christopher, SIU Edwardsville	
25	2023	Morehead State (4)	1–0 (a.e.t.)	Tennessee Tech	Tech Soccer Field • Cookeville, Tennessee	Kate Larbes, Morehead State	
26	2024	Lindenwood (1)	3–2	Morehead State	Tech Soccer Field • Cookeville, Tennessee	Mackenzie Compton, Lindenwood	
27	2025	Tennessee Tech (2)	2–0	Lindenwood	Tech Soccer Field • Cookeville, Tennessee	Maggie Conrad, Tennessee Tech	
28	2026	UT Martin (3)	2–1	Southern Indiana	Skyhawk Soccer Field • Martin, Tennessee	Millie Perry, UT Martin	

=== By School ===
As of 2026 Tournament

School	W	L	T	Pct.	Finals	Titles	Winning years
Austin Peay	4	7	1	.375	2	0	—
Belmont	3	3	3	.500	1	1	2019
Eastern Illinois	16	17	4	.485	7	5	1999, 2001, 2002, 2003, 2004
Eastern Kentucky	0	5	4	.222	2	0	—
Jacksonville State	3	4	2	.444	1	0	—
Lindenwood	6	3	1	.650	2	1	2024
Little Rock	2	4	0	.333	0	0	—
Middle Tennessee	1	1	0	.500	0	0	—
Morehead State	15	15	3	.500	4	1	2008
Murray State	11	11	2	.500	4	4	2009, 2015, 2017, 2018
Samford	3	2	4	.556	4	1	2005
SIU Edwardsville	17	5	6	.714	6	5	2014, 2016, 2020, 2021, 2022
Southeast Missouri State	17	19	9	.478	6	2	2006, 2007
Southern Indiana	5	4	1	.550	1	0	—
Tennessee Tech	11	12	3	.481	6	2	2000, 2025
UT Martin	13	17	4	.441	7	3	2011, 2012, 2026
Western Illinois	0	1	0	.000	0	0	—

Teams in Italics no longer sponsor women's soccer in the OVC.
