= 2016 Northeast Conference women's soccer tournament =

- Classification: Division I
- Teams: 4
- Matches: 3
- Site: Stokes Soccerplex; Loretto, Pennsylvania
- Champions: Saint Francis (3rd title)
- Winning coach: Brenda van Stralen (3rd title)

2016 Northeast Conference women's soccer standings
	Conf.						Overall
Team	W		L		T	PCT	W		L		T	PCT
St. Francis ‍†‍‡‍^{y}	6	–	2	–	0	.750	10	–	12	–	0	.455
Central Connecticut ‍†‍‍	6	–	2	–	0	.750	9	–	11	–	1	.452
Sacred Heart ‍‍‍	5	–	1	–	2	.750	8	–	6	–	5	.553
Fairleigh Dickinson ‍‍‍	5	–	2	–	1	.688	7	–	12	–	1	.375
Bryant ‍‍‍	4	–	3	–	1	.563	8	–	9	–	1	.472
Robert Morris ‍‍‍	4	–	4	–	0	.500	6	–	12	–	0	.333
Wagner ‍‍‍	2	–	6	–	0	.250	3	–	15	–	0	.167
Mount St. Mary's ‍‍‍	1	–	7	–	0	.125	5	–	12	–	1	.306
LIU Brooklyn ‍‍‍	1	–	7	–	0	.125	2	–	15	–	0	.118
† – Conference champion ‡ – 2016 NEC Tournament champion y – Invited to the NCAA tournament As of 2016-11-18; Rankings from NSCAA

The 2016 Northeast Conference women's soccer tournament is the postseason women's soccer tournament for the Northeast Conference held from November 4 to 6, 2016. The three match tournament was held at the Stokes Soccerplex in Loretto, Pennsylvania. The four team single-elimination tournament consisted of two rounds based on seeding from regular season conference play. The Fairleigh Dickinson Knights were the defending tournament champions after defeating the Robert Morris Colonials in the championship match.

== Bracket ==
Semifinals; Friday, November 4
1	Saint Francis	2
4	Fairleigh Dickinson	0
2	Central Connecticut	3
3	Sacred Heart	0

Final; Sunday, November 6
1	Saint Francis	2
2	Central Connecticut	0

== Schedule ==
=== Semifinals ===
November 4, 2016	#2 Central Connecticut	3–0	#3 Sacred Heart	Loretto, Pennsylvania
11:00 a.m. EST	Carla Jackson 5'; Laura Casanovasdiaz 41'; Danielle Pearse 69'	Report		Stadium: Stokes Soccerplex; Referee: Brian Opiela

November 4, 2016	#1 Saint Francis	2–0	#4 Fairleigh Dickinson	Loretto, Pennsylvania
2:00 p.m. EST	Abigail Tarosky 64'; Leah Hardin 75'	Report		Stadium: Stokes Soccerplex; Referee: Magda Zwierchowski

=== Final ===
November 6, 2016	#1 Saint Francis	2–0	#2 Central Connecticut	Loretto, Pennsylvania
12:00 p.m. EST	Sara Suler 26'; Alyssa McGhee 67'	Report		Stadium: Stokes Soccerplex; Referee: Jaroslav Werel

== See also ==
- Northeast Conference
- 2016 Northeast Conference women's soccer season
- 2016 NCAA Division I women's soccer season
- 2016 NCAA Division I Women's Soccer Tournament
