= 2016 Big South Conference women's soccer tournament =

- Classification: Division I
- Teams: 8
- Matches: 7
- Site: Bryan Park; Greensboro, North Carolina (Semifinals and Final)
- Champions: Liberty (6th title)
- Winning coach: Nate Norman (1st title)

2016 Big South Conference women's soccer standings
	Conf.						Overall
Team	W		L		T	PCT	W		L		T	PCT
High Point ‍†‍‍	7	–	1	–	1	.833	13	–	6	–	2	.667
Liberty ‍‍‡‍^{y}	7	–	2	–	0	.778	14	–	8	–	0	.636
Campbell ‍‍‍	6	–	3	–	0	.667	12	–	8	–	0	.600
Gardner–Webb ‍‍‍	6	–	3	–	0	.667	9	–	8	–	3	.525
Radford ‍‍‍	5	–	4	–	0	.556	7	–	9	–	0	.438
Longwood ‍‍‍	5	–	3	–	1	.611	8	–	10	–	2	.450
UNC Asheville ‍‍‍	3	–	6	–	0	.333	8	–	12	–	0	.400
Charleston Southern ‍‍‍	2	–	6	–	1	.278	6	–	11	–	1	.361
Winthrop ‍‍‍	1	–	7	–	1	.167	4	–	12	–	1	.265
Presbyterian ‍‍‍	1	–	8	–	0	.111	3	–	14	–	0	.176
† – Conference champion ‡ – 2016 Big South Tournament champion y – Invited to the NCAA tournament As of 2016-11-17; Rankings from NSCAA

The 2016 Big South Conference women's soccer tournament is the postseason women's soccer tournament for the Big South Conference held from October 28 to November 6, 2016. The seven match tournament was held at campus sites, with the semifinals and final held at Bryan Park in Greensboro, North Carolina. The eight team single-elimination tournament consisted of three rounds based on seeding from regular season conference play. The Liberty Flames were the defending tournament champions, after defeating the Campbell Lady Camels in the championship match.

== Bracket ==
Quarterfinals; October 28–30
1	High Point	1
8	Charleston Southern	0
4	Gardner–Webb	0 (2)
5	Longwood	0 (4)
2	Liberty	4
7	UNC Asheville	0
3	Campbell	2
6	Radford	0

Semifinals; Friday, November 4
1	High Point	1^{OT}
5	Longwood	0
2	Liberty	4
3	Campbell	0

Final; Sunday, November 6
1	High Point	1
2	Liberty	2^{OT}

== Schedule ==
=== Quarterfinals ===
October 28, 2016	#4 Gardner–Webb	0–0 (a.e.t.) (2–4 p)	#5 Longwood	Boiling Springs, North Carolina
7:00 p.m. EST		Report		Stadium: Greene-Harbison Stadium
	Penalties
	Brandi Arey (penalty missed); Justine Ibarra (penalty missed); Bailey Hierholzer (penalty scored); Braddick Price (penalty scored)		(penalty scored) Janese Quick; (penalty scored) Christina Corbin; (penalty scored) Emilie Kupsov; (penalty missed) Amanda Spencer; (penalty scored) Jayden Metzger

October 29, 2016	#3 Campbell	2–0	#6 Radford	Buies Creek, North Carolina
6:00 p.m. EST	Alexa Genas 33', 61'	Report		Stadium: Eakes Athletic Complex; Referee: Eric Varone

October 30, 2016	#1 High Point	1–0	#8 Charleston Southern	High Point, North Carolina
2:00 p.m. EST	Paige Rombach 82'	Report		Stadium: Vert Stadium; Referee: Larry Stroud

October 30, 2016	#2 Liberty	4–0	#7 UNC Asheville	Lynchburg, Virginia
2:00 p.m. EST	Jennifer Knoebel 36'; Isabella Habuda 49'; Devon Jones 52'; Erika Troutman 83'	Report		Stadium: Osborne Stadium; Referee: Kevin Broadley

=== Semifinals ===
November 4, 2016	#1 High Point	1–0 (a.e.t.)	#5 Longwood	Greensboro, North Carolina
4:00 p.m. EST	Becca Rolfe 94'	Report		Stadium: Bryan Park; Referee: Mark Buda

November 4, 2016	#2 Liberty	4–0	#3 Campbell	Greensboro, North Carolina
7:00 p.m. EST	Isabella Habuda 1'; Jennifer Knoebel 38', 59'; Devon Jones 72'	Report		Stadium: Bryan Park

=== Final ===
November 6, 2016	#1 High Point	1–2 (a.e.t.)	#2 Liberty	Greensboro, North Carolina
2:00 p.m. EST	Annie Redovian 14'	Report	Isabella Habuda 51'; Gabrielle Farrell 97'	Stadium: Bryan Park; Referee: Patrick Schmidt

== See also ==
- Big South Conference
- 2016 Big South Conference women's soccer season
- 2016 NCAA Division I women's soccer season
- 2016 NCAA Division I Women's Soccer Tournament
