= 2016 SWAC women's soccer tournament =

- Classification: Division I
- Teams: 8
- Matches: 7
- Site: PVA&M Soccer Stadium; Prairie View, Texas
- Champions: Alabama State (1st title)
- Winning coach: Jodie Smith (1st title)

2016 SWAC women's soccer standings
	Conf.						Overall
Team	W		L		T	PCT	W		L		T	PCT
Howard ‍†‍‍	9	–	0	–	1	.950	13	–	4	–	3	.725
Texas Southern ‍‍‍	8	–	1	–	1	.850	11	–	7	–	1	.605
Alabama State ‍‍‡‍^{y}	7	–	2	–	1	.750	11	–	10	–	1	.523
Arkansas–Pine Bluff ‍‍‍	7	–	2	–	1	.750	8	–	8	–	2	.500
Mississippi Valley State ‍‍‍	5	–	3	–	2	.600	5	–	9	–	2	.375
Jackson State ‍‍‍	4	–	6	–	1	.409	4	–	13	–	1	.250
Prairie View A&M ‍‍‍	3	–	5	–	1	.389	3	–	12	–	1	.219
Southern ‍‍‍	3	–	8	–	0	.273	3	–	15	–	0	.167
Alabama A&M ‍‍‍	2	–	7	–	0	.222	3	–	15	–	0	.167
Alcorn State ‍‍‍	2	–	8	–	0	.200	2	–	10	–	0	.167
Grambling State ‍‍‍	1	–	9	–	0	.100	1	–	11	–	0	.083
† – Conference champion ‡ – 2016 SWAC Tournament champion y – Invited to the NCAA tournament As of 2016-11-17; Rankings from NSCAA

The 2016 SWAC women's soccer tournament is the postseason women's soccer tournament for the Southwestern Athletic Conference held from November 3 to 6, 2016. The seven-match tournament was held at the Prairie View A&M Soccer Stadium in Prairie View, Texas. The eight team single-elimination tournament consisted of three rounds based on seeding from regular season conference play. The Howard Lady Bison were the defending tournament champions after defeating the Alabama State Hornets in the championship match.

== Bracket ==
Quarterfinals; Thursday, Nov. 3
1	Howard	4
8	Southern	0
4	AR-Pine Bluff	1
5	Miss. Valley St.	0
3	Alabama State	1
6	Jackson State	0
2	Texas Southern	1
7	Prairie View A&M	0

Semifinals; Friday, Nov. 4
1	Howard	0 (1)
4	AR-Pine Bluff	0 (3)
3	Alabama State	2
2	Texas Southern	1

Final; Sunday, Nov. 6
4	AR-Pine Bluff	1
3	Alabama State	2

== Schedule ==
=== Quarterfinals ===
November 3, 2016	#1 Howard	4–0	#8 Southern	Prairie View, Texas
10:00 a.m. CST	Kela Gray 4', 60'; Jordan Bynoe 41'; Makela Davidson 54'	Report		Stadium: PVA&M Soccer Stadium; Referee: Sarah Brannon

November 3, 2016	#4 Arkansas–Pine Bluff	1–0	#5 Mississippi Valley State	Prairie View, Texas
12:30 p.m. CST	Revecca Holmes 80'	Report		Stadium: PVA&M Soccer Stadium; Referee: Christina Hutchinson

November 3, 2016	#3 Alabama State	1–0	#6 Jackson State	Prairie View, Texas
3:00 p.m. CST	Aaliyah Lewis 17'	Report		Stadium: PVA&M Soccer Stadium; Referee: Patrick Muana

November 3, 2016	#2 Texas Southern	1–0	#7 Prairie View A&M	Prairie View, Texas
5:30 p.m. CST	Alisa Holloway 89'	Report		Stadium: PVA&M Soccer Stadium; Referee: Tiffini Turpin

=== Semifinals ===
November 4, 2016	#1 Howard	0–0 (a.e.t.) (1–3 p)	#4 Arkansas–Pine Bluff	Prairie View, Texas
3:00 p.m. CST		Report		Stadium: PVA&M Soccer Stadium; Referee: http://www.swac.org/ViewArticle.dbml?&DB_OEM_ID=27400&ATCLID=211275089
	Penalties
	Kendall Hamilton (penalty missed); Noelle McCullom (penalty missed); Nicole Bond (penalty scored); Whitney White (penalty missed)		(penalty scored) Daniela Montone; (penalty missed) Revecca Holmes; (penalty scored) Victoria Bresler; (penalty scored) Maira Abreu De Camp

November 4, 2016	#2 Texas Southern	1–2	#3 Alabama State	Prairie View, Texas
5:30 p.m. CST	Paige Hayward 44'	Report	Mercedes Padilla 74'; Larissa White 81'	Stadium: PVA&M Soccer Stadium; Referee: Matthew Thompson

=== Final ===
November 6, 2016	#3 Alabama State	2–1	#4 Arkansas–Pine Bluff	Prairie View, Texas
11:00 a.m. CST	Ariela Lewis 23', 63'	Report	Maria Del Carmen Rios Jean 73'	Stadium: PVA&M Soccer Stadium; Referee: Sarah Brannon
