= 2016 Southeastern Conference women's soccer season =

Southeastern Conference
- Season: 2016

2016 SEC women's soccer standings
	Conf.						Overall
Team	W		L		T	PCT	W		L		T	PCT
No. 5 South Carolina ‍†‍‍^{y}	11	–	0	–	0	1.000	21	–	1	–	1	.935
No. 8 Auburn ‍‍‍^{y}	9	–	2	–	0	.818	17	–	6	–	0	.739
No. 19 Arkansas ‍‍‍^{y}	8	–	3	–	0	.727	18	–	5	–	1	.771
No. 10 Florida ‍‍‡‍^{y}	8	–	3	–	0	.727	17	–	5	–	1	.761
Missouri ‍‍‍^{y}	6	–	4	–	1	.591	11	–	7	–	2	.600
Tennessee ‍‍‍	5	–	5	–	1	.500	11	–	9	–	1	.548
Texas A&M ‍‍‍^{y}	5	–	5	–	1	.500	12	–	8	–	2	.591
Vanderbilt ‍‍‍	5	–	5	–	1	.500	9	–	9	–	1	.500
Alabama ‍‍‍	4	–	5	–	2	.455	9	–	8	–	2	.526
Ole Miss ‍‍‍	4	–	7	–	0	.364	9	–	11	–	0	.450
Georgia ‍‍‍	3	–	8	–	0	.273	6	–	11	–	1	.361
LSU ‍‍‍	2	–	8	–	1	.227	7	–	11	–	1	.395
Kentucky ‍‍‍	1	–	7	–	3	.227	5	–	9	–	4	.389
Mississippi State ‍‍‍	1	–	10	–	0	.091	6	–	12	–	0	.333
† – Conference champion ‡ – 2016 SEC Tournament champion y – Invited to the NCAA tournament As of 2016-11-21; Rankings from NSCAA

The 2016 Southeastern Conference women's soccer season was the 214th season of women's varsity soccer in the conference.

The Florida Gators are both the defending regular season and tournament champions.

== Changes from 2015 ==
- None

== Teams ==
=== Stadia and locations ===
Team	Location	Stadium	Capacity
Alabama Crimson Tide	Tuscaloosa, Alabama	Alabama Soccer Stadium	1,500
Arkansas Razorbacks	Fayetteville, Arkansas	Razorback Soccer Stadium	2,000
Auburn Tigers	Auburn, Alabama	Auburn Soccer Complex	1,500
Florida Gators	Gainesville, Florida	Pressly Stadium	4,500
Georgia Lady Bulldogs	Athens, Georgia	Turner Soccer Complex	1,700
Kentucky Wildcats	Lexington, Kentucky	Bell Soccer Complex	3,368
LSU Tigers	Baton Rouge, Louisiana	LSU Soccer Stadium	2,197
Mississippi State Lady Bulldogs	Starkville, Mississippi	MSU Soccer Field	500
Missouri Tigers	Columbia, Missouri	Walton Stadium	2,500
Ole Miss Rebels	Oxford, Mississippi	Ole Miss Soccer Stadium	1,500
South Carolina Gamecocks	Columbia, South Carolina	Stone Stadium	5,000
Tennessee Volunteers	Knoxville, Tennessee	Regal Stadium	3,000
Texas A&M Aggies	College Station, Texas	Ellis Field	3,500
Vanderbilt Commodores	Nashville, Tennessee	Vanderbilt Soccer/Lacrosse Complex	2,400

== Regular season ==
=== Rankings ===
Legend
Increase in ranking
Decrease in ranking
Not ranked previous week

		Pre	Wk 2	Wk 3	Wk 4	Wk 5	Wk 6	Wk 7	Wk 8	Wk 9	Wk 10	Wk 11	Wk 12	Wk 13	Final
Alabama	C														
Arkansas	C														
Auburn	C	12													
Florida	C	7													
Georgia	C														
Kentucky	C														
LSU	C														
Mississippi State	C														
Missouri	C	22													
Ole Miss	C														
South Carolina	C	24													
Tennessee	C														
Texas A&M	C	8													
Vanderbilt	C														

== Postseason ==
=== SEC tournament ===
==== Bracket ====
First Round; Monday, October 31
7	Tennessee	2
10	Ole Miss	0
8	Texas A&M	1
9	Alabama	0

Quarterfinals; Wednesday, November 2
2	Auburn	3
7	Tennessee	1
3	Arkansas	1
6	Vanderbilt	0
1	South Carolina	2
8	Texas A&M	1
4	Florida	3 (8)
5	Missouri	3 (7)

Semifinals; Friday, November 4
2	Auburn	1
3	Arkansas	3
1	South Carolina	0
4	Florida	1

Championship; Sunday, November 6
3	Arkansas	1
4	Florida	2^{OT}

=== NCAA tournament ===
Seed	Region	School	1st round	2nd round	3rd round	Quarterfinals	Semifinals	Championship

== All-SEC awards and teams ==
2016 SEC Women's Soccer Individual Awards
Award	Recipient(s)
Coach of the Year	Shelley Smith, South Carolina
Offensive of the Year	Savannah McCaskill, South Carolina
Defensive Player of the Year	Kaleigh Kurtz, South Carolina
Freshman of the Year	Sarah Luebbert, Missouri
Scholar-Athlete of the Year	Casie Ramsier, Auburn

2016 SEC Women's Soccer All-Conference Teams
First Team	Second Team	Rookie Team
Forward: Kristen Dodson, Auburn; Forward: Savannah Jordan, Florida; Forward: Savannah McCaskill, South Carolina; Forward: Hannah Wilkinson, Tennessee; Midfielder: Claire Kelley, Arkansas; Midfielder: Casie Ramsier, Auburn; Midfielder: Meggie Dougherty Howard, Florida; Midfielder: Chelsea Drennan, South Carolina; Defender: Kiana Clarke, Auburn; Defender: Gabby Seiler, Florida; Defender: Paige Bendell, South Carolina; Defender: Kaleigh Kurtz, South Carolina; Goalkeeper: Mikayla Krzeczowski, South Carolina; At-Large: Marion Crowder, Georgia; At-Large: Melanie Donaldson, Missouri	Forward: Mallory Eubanks, Mississippi State; Forward: Sarah Luebbert, Missouri; Forward: Sophie Groff, South Carolina; Forward: Haley Pounds, Texas A&M; Midfielder: Brooke Ramsier, Auburn; Midfielder: Summer Clarke, LSU; Midfielder: Gretchen Harknett, Ole Miss; Midfielder: Kaitlyn Clark, Missouri; Midfielder: Rylie O'Keefe, Tennessee; Defender: Jessi Hartzler, Arkansas; Defender: Qyara Winston, Arkansas; Defender: Caroline Waters, Georgia; Defender: Lauren Selaiden, Missouri; Goalkeeper: Sarah Le Beau, Auburn; Goalkeeper: Danielle Rice, Texas A&M; At-Large: Kristen Cardano, Florida; At-Large: Cristina DeZeeuw, Vanderbilt	Stefani Doyle, Arkansas; Kayla McKeon, Arkansas; Bri Folds, Auburn; Karli Gutsche, Auburn; Julia Lester, Florida; Marissa Bosco, Kentucky; Evangeline Soucie, Kentucky; Sarah Luebbert, Missouri; Mikayla Krzeczowski, South Carolina; Maya Neal, Tennessee; Grace Piper, Texas A&M; Grace Jackson, Vanderbilt

== See also ==
- 2016 NCAA Division I women's soccer season
- 2016 SEC Women's Soccer Tournament
