= 2016 Utah Utes women's soccer team =

American college soccer season

2016 Utah Utes women's soccer

NCAA Tournament, Round of 16
- Conference: Pac-12 Conference

Ranking
- Coaches: No. 16
- Record: 13–4–5 (6–1–4 Pac-12)
- Head coach: Rich Manning
- Home stadium: Ute Soccer Field

2016 Pac-12 Conference women's soccer standings
	Conf.						Overall
Team	W		L		T	PCT	W		L		T	PCT
No. 6 Stanford ‍†‍‍^{y}	10	–	1	–	0	.909	18	–	2	–	1	.881
No. 1 USC ‍‍‍^{y}	8	–	2	–	1	.773	16	–	4	–	2	.773
No. 23 Colorado ‍‍‍^{y}	8	–	2	–	1	.773	15	–	6	–	1	.705
No. 13 UCLA ‍‍‍^{y}	7	–	3	–	1	.682	15	–	5	–	2	.727
No. 16 Utah ‍‍‍^{y}	6	–	1	–	4	.727	13	–	4	–	5	.705
Cal ‍‍‍^{y}	6	–	3	–	2	.636	13	–	5	–	3	.690
Arizona ‍‍‍	4	–	7	–	0	.364	9	–	9	–	1	.500
Washington State ‍‍‍	3	–	7	–	1	.318	8	–	9	–	2	.474
Oregon State ‍‍‍	3	–	8	–	0	.273	8	–	10	–	2	.450
Oregon ‍‍‍	2	–	8	–	1	.227	8	–	10	–	2	.450
Washington ‍‍‍	2	–	9	–	0	.182	7	–	12	–	1	.375
Arizona State ‍‍‍	1	–	9	–	1	.136	6	–	11	–	2	.368
† – Conference champion y – Invited to the NCAA tournament As of 2016-11-21; Rankings from NSCAA

The 2016 Utah Utes women's soccer team represented the University of Utah during the 2016 NCAA Division I women's soccer season.

== Schedule ==
August 19, 2016	Utah	4–0	Weber State	Salt Lake City
7:30 p.m. MDT	1' (o.g.); Jacobsen 26'; Daugirda 77'; Skolmoski 80'	Recap		Stadium: Ute Soccer Field; Attendance: 1550; Referee: Brad Jensen; Assistant referees: Alan Jimenez; Sergio Navas; Fourth official: Joshua Mills

August 21, 2016	Minnesota	3–0	Utah	Minneapolis
1:00 p.m. CDT	Stiever 27', 83'; Kolander 47'; Heslin (yellow card) 77'	Recap		Stadium: ELR Stadium; Attendance: 505; Referee: Matt Tiano; Assistant referees: Victor de Meireles; Haroon Elayed; Fourth official: Adam Backous

August 26, 2016	Utah	3–0	San Diego	Salt Lake City
7:30 p.m. MDT	Skolmoski 49', 88'; Ballstaedt 76'	Recap	Conners (yellow card) 80'	Stadium: Ute Soccer Field; Attendance: 1010; Referee: Hamed Sadeghi; Assistant referees: Paul Burgess; Allen Pickett; Fourth official: T.J. Zablocki

August 28, 2016	Utah State	0–3	Utah	Logan
1:00 p.m. MDT		Recap	Skolmoski 25'; Vukic 26'; Jacobsen 60'	Stadium: Bell Field; Attendance: 1438; Referee: Paul Scott; Assistant referees: Jay Hutchinson; Karsten Gillwald; Fourth official: Alan Jimenez

September 5, 2016	Utah	0–2	#10 BYU	Salt Lake City
3:30 p.m. MDT		Recap	Isom 21'; Hatch 61'	Stadium: Ute Soccer Field; Attendance: 2064; Referee: Alex Chilowicz; Assistant referees: T.J. Zablocki; Jay Hutchinson; Fourth official: Jeff Young

September 11, 2016	North Dakota State	1–3	Utah	Fargo
12:00 p.m. CDT	Lukas 3'	Recap	Skolmoski 15'; Flom 75'; Turang 83'	Stadium: Dacotah Field; Attendance: 186; Referee: Anis Tahar; Assistant referees: Tim Green; Matt Tiano; Fourth official: David Maier

September 16, 2016	Utah Valley	0–0	Utah	Orem
7:00 p.m. MDT		Recap		Stadium: Clyde Field; Attendance: 1987; Referee: Michael Anglin; Assistant referees: Trin Anglin; Karsten Gillwald; Fourth official: Bruce Lawhun

September 18, 2016	Utah	1–0	UC Irvine	Salt Lake City
1:00 p.m. MDT	Skolmoski 51'	Recap		Stadium: Ute Soccer Field; Attendance: 820; Referee: Allen Chapman; Assistant referees: Jay Hutchinson; Jim Ward; Fourth official: Paul Burgess

September 23, 2016	Washington	0–1	Utah	Seattle
7:00 p.m. PDT		Recap	Slattery 73' (pen.)	Stadium: Husky Soccer Stadium; Attendance: 1244; Referee: Ramon Hernandez; Assistant referees: Cameron Siler; Raymond Moffatte, Jr. Fourth official: Philippe Dor

September 29, 2016	Arizona State	1–1	Utah	Tempe
4:30 p.m. MST	Coon (yellow card) 44'; Mader 81'; Zerbel (yellow card) 106'	Recap	Rogers 44'; Skolmoski (yellow card) 84'	Stadium: Sun Devil Soccer Stadium; Attendance: 439; Referee: Lucas Brooks; Assistant referees: Mike Ambrose; Bennett Savage; Fourth official: Jesus Leon

October 2, 2016	Arizona	1–2	Utah	Tucson
1:00 p.m. MST	Crouch 11'	Recap	Skolmoski 31', 71'	Stadium: Mulcahy Stadium; Attendance: 522; Referee: Alex Marquand-Willse; Assistant referees: Brandon Marshall; Jordan Schultz; Fourth official: Jesus Leon

October 6, 2016	Utah	1–0	Oregon State	Salt Lake City
7:00 p.m. MDT	Skolmoski 15'	Recap	Fonsen (yellow card) 68'	Stadium: Ute Soccer Field; Attendance: 950; Referee: Hector Perez; Assistant referees: Brandon Major; Blake Griffiths; Fourth official: Michael Anglin

October 9, 2016	Utah	1–0	Oregon	Salt Lake City
2:00 p.m. MDT	Skolmoski 63'; Cacciacarne (yellow card) 81'	Recap		Stadium: Ute Soccer Field; Attendance: 1170; Referee: Salma Perez; Assistant referees: Alan Jimenez; Kali Smith; Fourth official: Jay Hutchinson

October 14, 2016	Utah	1–0	Washington State	Salt Lake City
7:00 p.m. MDT	Skolmoski 85'	Recap	Overland (yellow card) 47'	Stadium: Ute Soccer Field; Attendance: 1222; Referee: Jesus Cisneros; Assistant referees: T.J. Zablocki; Schuyler Pack; Fourth official: Paul Gutke

October 20, 2016	#10 California	1–1	Utah	Berkeley
2:00 p.m. PDT	Onumonu 60'	Recap	Slattery 23'; Skolmoski (yellow card) 107'	Stadium: Goldman Stadium; Attendance: 151; Referee: Michael Radchuk; Assistant referees: Andres Lanza; Andrew Hanks; Fourth official: Eder Del Angel

October 23, 2016	#3 Stanford	2–0	Utah	Stanford
1:00 p.m. PDT	Carusa 22'; Xiao 28'; Carusa (yellow card) 64'	Recap		Stadium: Cagan Stadium; Attendance: 2142; Referee: Ceciah Valero; Assistant referees: Deleana Quan; Brian Yip; Fourth official: Eder Del Angel

October 27, 2016	Utah	1–1	#4 USC	Salt Lake City
7:00 p.m. MDT	Flom 73'	Recap	McMorrow 79'	Stadium: Ute Soccer Field; Attendance: 1189; Referee: Michael Zapata; Assistant referees: Jay Hutchinson; Mitch Lillywhite; Fourth official: Paul Burgess

October 30, 2016	Utah	2–0	#9 UCLA	Salt Lake City
2:00 p.m. MDT	Jacobsen (yellow card) 8'; Rogers 20'; Skolmoski 88'	Recap	Fleming (yellow card) 66'	Stadium: Ute Soccer Field; Attendance: 1018; Referee: Eric Ehrhardt; Assistant referees: T.J. Zablocki; Brandon Major; Fourth official: Daniel Escalante

November 4, 2016	#22 Colorado	2–0	#23 Utah	Boulder
3:00 p.m. MDT	Evans 63'	Recap	Skolmoski 79'	Stadium: Prentup Field; Attendance: 778; Referee: Juan Guzman; Assistant referees: Megan McCain; Jacob Herold; Fourth official: Chris Greer

November 12, 2016	#23 Utah	1–0	Texas Tech	Salt Lake City
1:00 p.m. MDT	Gwerder (yellow card) 64'; Rogers 97'	Recap	Dapaah (yellow card) 62'	Stadium: Ute Soccer Field; Attendance: 1179; Referee: Josh Wilkens; Assistant referees: Jay Hutchinson; Brandon Major; Fourth official: Hamed Sadeghi

November 18, 2016	#10 Florida State	1–2	#23 Utah	Los Angeles
11:00 a.m. PDT	Edwards 18'	Recap	Vukic 14'; Cacciacarne 88'	Stadium: McAlister Field; Attendance: 445; Referee: Michael Zapata; Assistant referees: Salma Perez; Ceciah Valero; Fourth official: Robert Sarfaraz

November 20, 2016	#7 USC	1–0	#23 Utah	Los Angeles
12:00 p.m. PDT	Pruitt 73'	Recap		Stadium: McAlister Field; Attendance: 419; Referee: Alex Chilowicz; Assistant referees: Kristin Patterson; Cameron Blanchard; Fourth official: Reyna Fonseca
