= 2016 American Athletic Conference women's soccer tournament =

- Classification: Division I
- Teams: 6
- Matches: 5
- Site: Morrone Stadium; Storrs, Connecticut
- Champions: Connecticut (2nd title)
- Winning coach: Len Tsantiris (2nd title)
- Broadcast: ESPNU (Final only)

2016 American Athletic Conference women's soccer standings
	Conf.						Overall
Team	W		L		T	PCT	W		L		T	PCT
No. 20 Connecticut ‍†‍‡‍^{y}	8	–	0	–	1	.944	19	–	3	–	1	.848
Memphis ‍‍‍^{y}	8	–	1	–	0	.889	14	–	5	–	1	.725
SMU ‍‍‍^{y}	6	–	2	–	1	.722	13	–	7	–	2	.636
USF ‍‍‍	4	–	3	–	2	.556	12	–	4	–	3	.711
Cincinnati ‍‍‍	4	–	3	–	2	.556	11	–	5	–	4	.650
UCF ‍‍‍	4	–	4	–	1	.500	9	–	8	–	2	.526
Tulsa ‍‍‍	4	–	5	–	0	.444	8	–	10	–	1	.447
Houston ‍‍‍	1	–	6	–	2	.222	6	–	7	–	3	.469
East Carolina ‍‍‍	1	–	7	–	1	.167	5	–	12	–	1	.306
Temple ‍‍‍	0	–	9	–	0	.000	3	–	16	–	0	.158
† – Conference champion ‡ – 2016 AAC Tournament champion y – Invited to the NCAA tournament As of 2016-11-20; Rankings from NSCAA

The 2016 American Athletic Conference women's soccer tournament is the postseason women's soccer tournament for the American Athletic Conference held from November 2 to 6, 2016. The five match tournament was held at Morrone Stadium, home field of the regular season champion Connecticut Huskies in Storrs, Connecticut. The six team single-elimination tournament consists of three rounds based on seeding from regular season conference play. The Cincinnati Bearcats were the defending tournament champions, after defeating the USF Bulls in a penalty kick shootout in the championship match the previous year.

== Bracket ==
First round Wednesday, Nov. 2
4	USF	0 (4)
5	Cincinnati	0 (3)
3	SMU	1 (3)
6	UCF	1 (2)

Semifinals; Friday, Nov. 4
1	Connecticut	2
4	USF	0
2	Memphis	0
3	SMU	1

Final; Sunday, Nov. 6
1	Connecticut	1
3	SMU	0

== Schedule ==
=== First round ===
November 2, 2016	#3 SMU	1–1 (a.e.t.) (3–2 p)	#6 UCF	Storrs, Connecticut
4:30 p.m. EST	Claire Oates 71'	Report	Carol Rodrigues 5'	Stadium: Morrone Stadium; Referee: Mark Allatin
	Penalties
	Vanessa Valadez (penalty scored); Allie Thornton (penalty scored); Hannah Fleet (penalty missed); Claire Oates (penalty scored)		(penalty scored) Carol Rodrigues; (penalty scored) Zandy Soree; (penalty missed) Morgan Ferrara; (penalty missed) Julia Moore; (penalty missed) Amanda Wilkin

November 2, 2016	#4 USF	0–0 (a.e.t.) (4–3 p)	#5 Cincinnati	Storrs, Connecticut
7:00 p.m. EST		Report		Stadium: Morrone Stadium; Referee: Michael Wallace
	Penalties
	Grace Adams (penalty scored); Trudi Carter (penalty scored); Andrea Hauksdottir (penalty scored); Evelyne Viens (penalty missed); Yasmine Hall (penalty missed); Leticia Skeete (penalty scored)		(penalty missed) Julie Gavorski; (penalty scored) Cassie Wheldon; (penalty missed) Bailey Wilson; (penalty scored) Jordan Cotleur; (penalty scored) Taylor Pavlika; (penalty missed) Tiffany Huber

=== Semifinals ===
November 4, 2016	#2 Memphis	0–1	#3 SMU	Storrs, Connecticut
4:30 p.m. EST		Report	Claire Oates 85'	Stadium: Morrone Stadium; Referee: Bruno Mozzo

November 4, 2016	#1 Connecticut	2–0	#4 USF	Storrs, Connecticut
7:00 p.m. EST	Rachel Hill 38'; Stephanie Ribeiro 50'	Report		Stadium: Morrone Stadium; Referee: Noel Cotterell

=== Final ===
November 6, 2016	#1 Connecticut	1–0	#3 SMU	Storrs, Connecticut
2:00 p.m. EST	Rachel Hill 40'	Report		Stadium: Morrone Stadium; Referee: Cassio Ribeiro
