= 2016 Sun Belt Conference women's soccer tournament =

- Classification: Division I
- Teams: 8
- Matches: 7
- Site: Foley Sports Complex; Foley, Alabama
- Champions: South Alabama (4th title)
- Winning coach: Graham Winkworth (4th title)

2016 Sun Belt Conference women's soccer standings
	Conf.						Overall
Team	W		L		T	PCT	W		L		T	PCT
South Alabama ‍†‍‡‍^{y}	7	–	3	–	0	.700	15	–	6	–	1	.705
Coastal Carolina ‍‍‍	6	–	2	–	2	.700	12	–	6	–	3	.643
Little Rock ‍‍‍	6	–	3	–	1	.650	12	–	8	–	1	.595
Appalachian State ‍‍‍	4	–	4	–	2	.500	10	–	8	–	2	.550
Louisiana–Lafayette ‍‍‍	4	–	4	–	2	.500	8	–	9	–	2	.474
Louisiana–Monroe ‍‍‍	4	–	4	–	2	.500	7	–	9	–	3	.447
Arkansas State ‍‍‍	4	–	5	–	1	.450	6	–	8	–	3	.441
Troy ‍‍‍	3	–	5	–	2	.400	7	–	10	–	3	.425
Texas State ‍‍‍	3	–	5	–	2	.400	6	–	9	–	3	.417
Georgia State ‍‍‍	2	–	4	–	4	.400	5	–	6	–	6	.471
Georgia Southern ‍‍‍	3	–	7	–	0	.300	6	–	10	–	1	.382
† – Conference champion ‡ – 2016 Sun Belt Tournament champion y – Invited to the NCAA tournament As of 2016-11-14; Rankings from NSCAA

The 2016 Sun Belt Conference women's soccer tournament is the postseason women's soccer tournament for the Sun Belt Conference held from November 2 to 6, 2016. The seven-match tournament was held at the Foley Sports Complex in Foley, Alabama. The eight team single-elimination tournament consisted of three rounds based on seeding from regular season conference play. The South Alabama Jaguars were the defending tournament champions after defeating the Georgia State Panthers in the championship match.

== Bracket ==
Quarterfinals; Wednesday, Nov. 2
2	Coastal Carolina	3
7	Arkansas State	0
3	Little Rock	2
6	Louisiana–Monroe	0
4	Appalachian State	3
5	Louisiana–Lafayette	0
1	South Alabama	1
8	Troy	0

Semifinals; Friday, Nov. 4
2	Coastal Carolina	2
3	Little Rock	0
1	South Alabama	6
4	Appalachian State	0

Final; Sunday, Nov. 6
2	Coastal Carolina	0
1	South Alabama	2

== Schedule ==
=== Quarterfinals ===
November 2, 2016	#2 Coastal Carolina	3–0	#7 Arkansas State	Foley, Alabama
10:00 a.m. CST	Ellie Taylor 53'; Daniella Famili 62'; Brooke Horist 76'	Report		Stadium: Foley Sports Complex; Referee: Andrew Musashe

November 2, 2016	#3 Little Rock	2–0	#6 Louisiana–Monroe	Foley, Alabama
1:00 p.m. CST	Quin Wilkes 31'; Doro Greulich 34'	Report		Stadium: Foley Sports Complex; Referee: Jennifer Politz

November 2, 2016	#4 Appalachian State	3–0	#5 Louisiana–Lafayette	Foley, Alabama
4:00 p.m. CST	Jackie Nieradka 58'; Erin Settle 66'; Maggie Hanusek 77'	Report		Stadium: Foley Sports Complex; Referee: David Faye

November 2, 2016	#1 South Alabama	1–0	#8 Troy	Foley, Alabama
7:00 p.m. CST	Ashlynn Jones 79'	Report		Stadium: Foley Sports Complex; Referee: Randall Kelley

=== Semifinals ===
November 4, 2016	#2 Coastal Carolina	2–0	#3 Little Rock	Foley, Alabama
4:00 p.m. CST	Kylie Bostick 50'; Amber Adams 54'	Report		Stadium: Foley Sports Complex; Referee: Brian Marshall

November 4, 2016	#1 South Alabama	6–0	#4 Appalachian State	Foley, Alabama
7:00 p.m. CST	Jemma Purfield 20'; Team 24' (o.g.); Ashlynn Jones 27'; Charde Hannah 45'; Hannah Godfrey 52'; Rio Hardy 76'	Report		Stadium: Foley Sports Complex; Referee: Andrew Musashe

=== Final ===
November 6, 2016	#1 South Alabama	2–0	#2 Coastal Carolina	Foley, Alabama
1:00 p.m. CST	Jemma Purfield 57', 85'	Report		Stadium: Foley Sports Complex; Referee: Ashlee Varnson
