= 2016 Conference USA women's soccer tournament =

- Classification: Division I
- Teams: 8
- Matches: 7
- Site: Transamerica Field; Charlotte, North Carolina
- Champions: Charlotte (3rd title)
- Winning coach: John Cullen (1st title)

2016 Conference USA women's soccer standings
| | Conf. | | | | | | Overall |
| Team | W | | L | | T | PCT | W | | L | | T | PCT |
|---|---|---|---|---|---|---|---|---|---|---|---|---|
| North Texas ‍†‍‍ | 9 | – | 1 | – | 0 | .900 | 15 | – | 5 | – | 1 | .738 |
| Rice ‍‍‍ | 8 | – | 2 | – | 0 | .800 | 11 | – | 5 | – | 1 | .676 |
| Western Kentucky ‍‍‍ | 7 | – | 3 | – | 0 | .700 | 12 | – | 6 | – | 1 | .658 |
| Florida Atlantic ‍‍‍ | 6 | – | 3 | – | 1 | .650 | 12 | – | 8 | – | 2 | .591 |
| Louisiana Tech ‍‍‍ | 6 | – | 4 | – | 0 | .600 | 14 | – | 6 | – | 1 | .690 |
| Charlotte ‍‍‡‍^{y} | 5 | – | 4 | – | 1 | .550 | 11 | – | 9 | – | 2 | .545 |
| UTEP ‍‍‍ | 5 | – | 5 | – | 0 | .500 | 13 | – | 7 | – | 2 | .636 |
| Old Dominion ‍‍‍ | 5 | – | 5 | – | 0 | .500 | 7 | – | 12 | – | 0 | .368 |
| Marshall ‍‍‍ | 4 | – | 4 | – | 2 | .500 | 6 | – | 7 | – | 4 | .471 |
| UTSA ‍‍‍ | 3 | – | 7 | – | 0 | .300 | 7 | – | 12 | – | 0 | .368 |
| Southern Miss ‍‍‍ | 2 | – | 6 | – | 2 | .300 | 8 | – | 7 | – | 2 | .529 |
| FIU ‍‍‍ | 2 | – | 6 | – | 2 | .300 | 3 | – | 11 | – | 3 | .265 |
| Middle Tennessee ‍‍‍ | 2 | – | 8 | – | 0 | .200 | 4 | – | 12 | – | 1 | .265 |
| UAB ‍‍‍ | 1 | – | 7 | – | 2 | .200 | 4 | – | 11 | – | 2 | .294 |
† – Conference champion ‡ – 2016 C-USA Tournament champion y – Invited to the NCAA Tournament; As of 2016-11-17; Rankings from NSCAA

The 2016 Conference USA women's soccer tournament is the postseason women's soccer tournament for Conference USA held from November 2 to 6, 2016. The seven-match tournament was held at the Transamerica Field in Charlotte, North Carolina. The eight team single-elimination tournament consisted of three rounds based on seeding from regular season conference play. The North Texas Mean Green were the defending tournament champions after defeating the Marshall Thundering Herd in the championship match.

== Bracket ==
Quarterfinals; Wednesday, Nov. 2
1 | North Texas | 2 ^{OT}
8 | Old Dominion | 1
4 | Florida Atlantic | 3
5 | Louisiana Tech | 0
2 | Rice | 0
7 | UTEP | 1
3 | Western Kentucky | 1 (1)
6 | Charlotte | 1 (4)

Semifinals; Friday, Nov. 4
1 | North Texas | 2
4 | Florida Atlantic | 3
7 | UTEP | 0
6 | Charlotte | 1

Final; Sunday, Nov. 6
4 | Florida Atlantic | 0
6 | Charlotte | 4

== Schedule ==
=== Quarter-finals ===
| November 2, 2016 | #1 North Texas | 2–1 (a.e.t.) | #8 Old Dominion | Charlotte, North Carolina |
| 11:00 a.m. EST | Anna Flobeck 83'; Rachel Holden 92' | Report | Grace Haverly 90' | Stadium: Transamerica Field; Referee: Jorge Ramirez |

| November 2, 2016 | #4 Florida Atlantic | 3–0 | #5 Louisiana Tech | Charlotte, North Carolina |
| 1:30 p.m. EST | Elisha Holmes 10'; Sammy Rowland 15', 90' | Report | | Stadium: Transamerica Field; Referee: Nima Saghafi |

| November 2, 2016 | #2 Rice | 0–1 | #7 UTEP | Charlotte, North Carolina |
| 4:30 p.m. EST | | Report | Jeanna Mullen 24' | Stadium: Transamerica Field; Referee: Rubiel Vazquez |

| November 2, 2016 | #3 Western Kentucky | 1–1 (a.e.t.) (1–4 p) | #6 Charlotte | Charlotte, North Carolina |
| 7:00 p.m. EST | Sarah Gorham 83' | Report | Martha Thomas 23' | Stadium: Transamerica Field; Referee: Rob Mann |
| | Penalties |
| | Iris Dunn (penalty missed); Olivia Fitzgerald (penalty scored); Andrea Larsen (penalty missed) | | (penalty scored) Sara Sandberg; (penalty scored) Martha Thomas; (penalty scored) Shelby Hicks; (penalty scored) Katie O'Neill |

=== Semi-finals ===
| November 4, 2016 | #1 North Texas | 2–3 | #4 Florida Atlantic | Charlotte, North Carolina |
| 4:30 p.m. EST | Tori Phillips 60'; Marchelle Davis 73' | Report | Sammy Rowland 22'; Elisha Holmes 51'; Kelsey Parry 82' | Stadium: Transamerica Field; Referee: Rubiel Vasquez |

| November 4, 2016 | #7 UTEP | 0–1 | #6 Charlotte | Charlotte, North Carolina |
| 7:00 p.m. EST | | Report | Rebecca Beatty 36' | Stadium: Transamerica Field; Referee: Nima Saghafi |

=== Final ===
| November 6, 2016 | #4 Florida Atlantic | 0–4 | #6 Charlotte | Charlotte, North Carolina |
| 11:00 a.m. EST | | Report | Julia Grainda 6'; Katie O'Neill 26'; Megan Greene 43'; Emily Truelove 48' | Stadium: Transamerica Field; Referee: Guido Gonzales |
