= 2016 Mountain West Conference women's soccer tournament =

- Classification: Division I
- Teams: 6
- Matches: 5
- Site: SDSU Sports Deck; San Diego, California
- Champions: UNLV (3rd title)
- Winning coach: Chris Shaw (1st title)

2016 Mountain West Conference women's soccer standings
	Conf.						Overall
Team	W		L		T	PCT	W		L		T	PCT
UNLV ‍†‍‡‍^{y}	8	–	1	–	2	.818	16	–	4	–	3	.761
San Jose State ‍‍‍	7	–	3	–	1	.682	10	–	6	–	4	.600
San Diego State ‍‍‍	6	–	2	–	3	.682	10	–	7	–	4	.571
Utah State ‍‍‍	7	–	4	–	0	.636	12	–	9	–	0	.571
Wyoming ‍‍‍	6	–	4	–	1	.591	10	–	8	–	2	.550
Boise State ‍‍‍	5	–	3	–	3	.591	6	–	11	–	4	.381
Fresno State ‍‍‍	5	–	5	–	1	.500	10	–	8	–	1	.553
New Mexico ‍‍‍	5	–	5	–	1	.500	9	–	7	–	3	.553
Colorado College ‍‍‍	4	–	7	–	0	.364	8	–	11	–	0	.421
Air Force ‍‍‍	3	–	7	–	1	.318	7	–	9	–	2	.444
Nevada ‍‍‍	2	–	9	–	0	.182	5	–	13	–	0	.278
Colorado State ‍‍‍	1	–	9	–	1	.136	3	–	14	–	2	.211
† – Conference champion ‡ – 2016 MWC Tournament champion y – Invited to the NCAA Tournament; As of 2016-11-17; Rankings from NSCAA

The 2016 Mountain West Conference women's soccer tournament was the postseason women's soccer tournament for the Mountain West Conference held from November 1 to 5, 2016. The five match tournament was held at the SDSU Sports Deck in San Diego, California. The six team single-elimination tournament consisted of three rounds based on seeding from regular season conference play. The San Jose State Spartans were the defending tournament champions after defeating the San Diego State Aztecs in a penalty kick shootout in the championship match.

== Bracket ==
First round Tuesday, Nov. 1
4	Utah State	2
5	Wyoming	1
3	San Diego State	2
6	Boise State	0

Semifinals; Thursday, Nov. 3
1	UNLV	2
4	Utah State	1
2	San Jose State	0
3	San Diego State	2

Final; Saturday, Nov. 5
1	UNLV	3 (4)
3	San Diego State	3 (3)

== Schedule ==
=== First round ===
November 1, 2016	#4 Utah State	2–1	#5 Wyoming	San Diego, California
4:00 p.m. PST	Lauren Harmon 24'; Wesley Hamblin 40'	Report	Tristan Tyrrell 88'	Stadium: SDSU Sports Deck; Referee: Ricardo Fierro

November 1, 2016	#3 San Diego State	2–0	#6 Boise State	San Diego, California
7:00 p.m. PST	Victoria Barba 14', 64'	Report		Stadium: SDSU Sports Deck; Referee: Alex Chilowicz

=== Semifinals ===
November 3, 2016	#1 UNLV	2–1	#4 Utah State	San Diego, California
4:00 p.m. PST	Dakota Blazak 6'; Lily Sender 15'	Report	Lauren Harmon 64'	Stadium: SDSU Sports Deck; Referee: Ellijio Arreguin

November 3, 2016	#2 San Jose State	0–2	#3 San Diego State	San Diego, California
7:00 p.m. PST		Report	Angela Mitchell 15'; Victoria Barba 28'	Stadium: SDSU Sports Deck; Referee: Brad Jensen

=== Final ===
November 5, 2016	#1 UNLV	3–3 (a.e.t.) (4–3 p)	#3 San Diego State	San Diego, California
7:00 p.m. PST	Sophie Cortes 25'; Susie Bernal 48'; Jordan Magnin 85'	Report	Victoria Barba 48', 59', 89'	Stadium: SDSU Sports Deck; Referee: Hector Perez
	Penalties
	Kendall Sandoval (penalty scored); Jordan Magnin (penalty missed); Chidera Akubuilo (penalty scored); Hayley Wilson (penalty scored); Georgia Kingman (penalty scored)		(penalty scored) Gemma Craine; (penalty scored) Aliyah Utush; (penalty missed) Victoria Barba; (penalty scored) Dani Derosa; (penalty missed) Darci Weiser
