= 2016 Missouri Valley Conference women's soccer tournament =

- Classification: Division I
- Teams: 6
- Matches: 5
- Site: Adelaide Street Field; Normal, Illinois (Semifinals & Final)
- Champions: Illinois State (7th title)
- Winning coach: Eric Golz (1st title)

2016 Missouri Valley Conference women's soccer standings
	Conf.						Overall
Team	W		L		T	PCT	W		L		T	PCT
Illinois State ‍†‍‡‍^{y}	5	–	0	–	1	.917	14	–	6	–	3	.674
Evansville ‍‍‍	3	–	2	–	1	.583	4	–	12	–	3	.289
Northern Iowa ‍‍‍	2	–	2	–	2	.500	8	–	8	–	3	.500
Indiana State ‍‍‍	2	–	3	–	1	.417	7	–	11	–	2	.400
Drake ‍‍‍	2	–	3	–	1	.417	12	–	4	–	3	.711
Loyola ‍‍‍	2	–	4	–	0	.333	5	–	11	–	3	.342
Missouri State ‍‍‍	1	–	3	–	2	.333	5	–	8	–	4	.412
† – Conference champion ‡ – 2016 Missouri Valley Tournament champion y – Invited to the NCAA tournament As of 2016-11-20; Rankings from NSCAA

The 2016 Missouri Valley Conference women's soccer tournament is the postseason women's soccer tournament for the Missouri Valley Conference held from October 30 to November 6, 2016. The five match tournament was held at campus sites, with the semifinals and final held at Adelaide Street Field in Normal, Illinois. The six team single-elimination tournament consisted of three rounds based on seeding from regular season conference play. The Evansville Purple Aces were the defending tournament champions after defeating the Loyola Ramblers in a penalty kick shootout in the championship match.

== Bracket ==
First round Sunday, Oct. 30
3	Northern Iowa	0
6	Loyola	1
4	Indiana State	0 (3)
5	Drake	0 (2)

Semifinals; Friday, Nov. 4
2	Evansville	1 (8)
6	Loyola	1 (7)
1	Illinois State	1^{OT}
4	Indiana State	0

Final; Sunday, Nov. 6
2	Evansville	1
1	Illinois State	2

== Schedule ==
=== First Round ===
October 30, 2016	#4 Indiana State	0–0 (a.e.t.) (3–2 p)	#5 Drake	Terre Haute, Indiana
12:00 p.m. CST		Report		Stadium: Memorial Stadium; Referee: George Major
	Penalties
	Maddie Orf (penalty scored); Sydney Hamker (penalty scored); Kasey Wallace (penalty scored); Gaelen Stejbach (penalty missed); Katie Wells (penalty missed)		(penalty missed) Alyssa Brand; (penalty scored) Kasey Hurt; (penalty scored) Hannah Wilder; (penalty missed) Sarah Nicholson; (penalty missed) Kayla Armstrong

October 30, 2016	#3 Northern Iowa	0–1	#6 Loyola	Waterloo, Iowa
1:00 p.m. CST		Report	Avalon Senn-Raemont 20'	Stadium: Cedar Valley Soccer Complex; Referee: Justin Mac

=== Semifinals ===
November 4, 2016	#2 Evansville	1–1 (a.e.t.) (8–7 p)	#6 Loyola	Normal, Illinois
3:30 p.m. CST	Bronwyn Boswell 57'	Report	Avalon Senn-Raemont 20'	Stadium: Adelaide Street Field; Referee: Douglas Wolff
	Penalties
	Bronwyn Boswell (penalty scored); Molly Lear (penalty scored); JBess Ruby (penalty scored); Jess O'Shaughnessy (penalty scored); Emily Richardson (penalty missed); Colleen Dierkes (penalty scored); Montana Portenier (penalty scored); Laura Minor (penalty scored); Mikayla Harvey (penalty scored)		(penalty scored) Ciara Murray; (penalty scored) Sienna Cruz; (penalty missed) Jenna Szczesny; (penalty scored) Emily Lange; (penalty scored) Taylor Lambouris; (penalty scored) Carolina Dunbar; (penalty scored) Abby Burridge; (penalty scored) Avalon Senn-Raemont; (penalty missed) Ashley Bovee

November 4, 2016	#1 Illinois State	1–0 (a.e.t.)	#4 Indiana State	Normal, Illinois
6:00 p.m. CST	Lauren Koehl 99'	Report		Stadium: Adelaide Street Field; Referee: Doug Ferguson

=== Final ===
November 6, 2016	#1 Illinois State	2–1	#2 Evansville	Normal, Illinois
1:00 p.m. CST	Paige Jarsombeck 53'; Lauren Koehl 62'	Report	Bronwyn Boswell 38'	Stadium: Adelaide Street Field; Referee: William A. Delois
