= 2016 Mid-American Conference women's soccer tournament =

- Classification: Division I
- Teams: 8
- Matches: 7
- Site: Dix Stadium; Kent, Ohio (Semifinals and Final)
- Champions: Kent State (1st title)
- Winning coach: Rob Marinaro (1st title)

2016 Mid-American Conference women's soccer standings
	Conf.						Overall
Team	W		L		T	PCT	W		L		T	PCT
East Division
Kent State ‍‍‡‍^{y}	8	–	1	–	2	.818	15	–	3	–	2	.800
Miami (OH) ‍‍‍	5	–	4	–	2	.545	8	–	9	–	2	.474
Buffalo ‍‍‍	4	–	4	–	3	.500	7	–	8	–	5	.475
Bowling Green ‍‍‍	3	–	7	–	1	.318	8	–	10	–	1	.447
Ohio ‍‍‍	3	–	8	–	0	.273	5	–	12	–	1	.306
Akron ‍‍‍	1	–	6	–	4	.273	4	–	11	–	4	.316
West Division
Ball State ‍†‍‍	9	–	1	–	1	.864	14	–	3	–	3	.775
Central Michigan ‍‍‍	6	–	2	–	3	.682	15	–	3	–	3	.786
Western Michigan ‍‍‍	6	–	4	–	1	.591	13	–	7	–	1	.643
Eastern Michigan ‍‍‍	4	–	5	–	2	.455	6	–	10	–	4	.400
Northern Illinois ‍‍‍	3	–	6	–	2	.364	5	–	11	–	5	.357
Toledo ‍‍‍	3	–	7	–	1	.318	8	–	10	–	1	.447
† – Conference champion ‡ – 2016 MAC Tournament champion y – Invited to the NCAA Tournament; As of 2016-11-18; Rankings from NSCAA

The 2016 Mid-American Conference women's soccer tournament is the postseason women's soccer tournament for the Mid-American Conference held from October 30 to 6, 2016. The seven-match tournament was held at campus sites, before moving to Dix Stadium in Kent, Ohio for the semifinals and final. The eight-team single-elimination tournament consisted of three rounds based on seeding from regular season conference play. The Western Michigan Broncos were the defending tournament champions after defeating the Miami RedHawks in the championship match.

Kent State won the tournament, defeating Northern Illinois 1–0 in the final on November 6 with an 86th-minute goal by Kristen Brots. It was the program's first MAC tournament title and earned Kent State its first berth in the NCAA tournament.

== Bracket ==
Quarterfinals; Sunday, Oct. 30
1	Ball State	1 (3)
8	Northern Illinois	1 (4)
4	Western Michigan	1
5	Miami (OH)	0
2	Kent State	2
7	Eastern Michigan	0
3	Central Michigan	1
6	Buffalo	0

Semifinals; Friday, Nov. 4
8	Northern Illinois	3
4	Western Michigan	2
2	Kent State	3
3	Central Michigan	1

Final; Sunday, Nov. 6
8	Northern Illinois	0
2	Kent State	1

== Schedule ==
=== Quarterfinals ===
October 30, 2016	#1 Ball State	1–1 (a.e.t.) (3–4 p)	#8 Northern Illinois	Muncie, Indiana
1:00 p.m. EST	Sam Kambol 38'	Report	Taylor Sarver 58'	Stadium: Briner Sports Complex; Referee: Nick Balcer
	Penalties
	Allison Abbe (penalty missed); Lorina White (penalty scored); Monica Padilla (penalty scored); Paula Guerrero (penalty scored); Yela Ziswiler (penalty missed)		(penalty scored) Allie Ingham; (penalty scored) Taylor Sarver; (penalty scored) Natalie Yass; (penalty missed) Natalia Pena; (penalty scored) Haley Cummings

October 30, 2016	#4 Western Michigan	1–0	#5 Miami (OH)	Kalamazoo, Michigan
1:00 p.m. EST	Candice Uhl 8'	Report		Stadium: WMU Soccer Complex; Referee: Bryan Miller

October 30, 2016	#2 Kent State	2–0	#7 Eastern Michigan	Kent, Ohio
1:00 p.m. EST	Donavan Capehart 51'; Hayden Pascoe 81'	Report		Stadium: Dix Stadium; Referee: Marc Lawrence

October 30, 2016	#3 Central Michigan	1–0	#6 Buffalo	Mount Pleasant, Michigan
1:00 p.m. EST	Alexis Pelafas 3'	Report		Stadium: CMU Soccer-Lacrosse Stadium

=== Semifinals ===
November 4, 2016	#8 Northern Illinois	3–2	#4 Western Michigan	Kent, Ohio
5:30 p.m. EST	Allie Ingham 50', 59'; Kelsey Chope 73'	Report	Megan Ross 19'; Alex Ruffer 83'	Stadium: Dix Stadium; Referee: Khalaf Al-Latayfeh

November 4, 2016	#2 Kent State	3–1	#3 Central Michigan	Kent, Ohio
8:00 p.m. EST	Karli Paracca 50'; Jenna Hellstrom 62'; Hayden Pascoe 77'	Report	Taylor Potts 6'	Stadium: Dix Stadium; Referee: Donovan Noocha

=== Final ===
November 6, 2016	#2 Kent State	1–0	#8 Northern Illinois	Kent, Ohio
1:00 p.m. EST	Kristen Brots 86'	Report		Stadium: Dix Stadium; Referee: Justin Tatsak
