= 2016 Ohio Valley Conference women's soccer tournament =

- Classification: Division I
- Teams: 6
- Matches: 5
- Site: Cutchin Field; Murray, Kentucky (Semifinals & Final)
- Champions: SIU Edwardsville (2nd title)
- Winning coach: Derek Burton (2nd title)

2016 Ohio Valley Conference women's soccer standings
	Conf.						Overall
Team	W		L		T	PCT	W		L		T	PCT
Murray State ‍†‍‍	7	–	0	–	3	.850	8	–	5	–	4	.588
Eastern Kentucky ‍‍‍	8	–	2	–	0	.800	13	–	5	–	1	.711
Tennessee Tech ‍‍‍	6	–	2	–	2	.700	11	–	6	–	4	.619
SIU Edwardsville ‍‍‡‍^{y}	6	–	3	–	1	.650	10	–	8	–	5	.543
Austin Peay ‍‍‍	5	–	2	–	3	.650	10	–	6	–	4	.600
Belmont ‍‍‍	5	–	4	–	1	.550	6	–	9	–	4	.421
Southeast Missouri State ‍‍‍	3	–	4	–	3	.450	9	–	6	–	4	.579
Morehead State ‍‍‍	3	–	6	–	1	.350	6	–	11	–	2	.368
Jacksonville State ‍‍‍	2	–	8	–	0	.200	5	–	13	–	1	.289
Eastern Illinois ‍‍‍	2	–	8	–	0	.200	5	–	13	–	0	.278
UT Martin ‍‍‍	1	–	9	–	0	.100	4	–	14	–	0	.222
† – Conference champion ‡ – 2016 OVC Tournament champion y – Invited to the NCAA tournament As of 2016-11-20; Rankings from NSCAA

The 2016 Ohio Valley Conference women's soccer tournament was the postseason women's soccer tournament for the Ohio Valley Conference, scheduled from October 30 to November 6, 2016. The five match tournament was to be held at campus sites, with the semifinals and final scheduled at Cutchin Field in Murray, Kentucky. The six team single-elimination tournament would consist of three rounds based on seeding from regular season conference play. The Murray State Racers were the defending tournament champions after defeating the Southeast Missouri State Redhawks in overtime in the championship match.

== Bracket ==
First round Sunday, Oct. 30
3	Tennessee Tech	3
6	Belmont	0
4	SIU Edwardsville	0 (5)
5	Austin Peay	0 (4)

Semifinals; Friday, Nov. 4
2	Eastern Kentucky	0 (4)
3	Tennessee Tech	0 (1)
1	Murray State	1
4	SIU Edwardsville	2^{OT}

Final; Sunday, Nov. 6
2	Eastern Kentucky	0
4	SIU Edwardsville	1

== Schedule ==
=== First Round ===
October 30, 2016	#3 Tennessee Tech	3–0	#6 Belmont	Cookeville, Tennessee
1:00 p.m. CST	Dani Shartouny 22', 72'; Michaella Keyes 45'	Report		Stadium: Tech Soccer Field; Referee: John Morris

October 30, 2016	#4 SIU Edwardsville	0–0 (a.e.t.) (5–4 p)	#5 Austin Peay	Edwardsville, Illinois
1:00 p.m. CST		Report		Stadium: Korte Stadium; Referee: Jon Huber
	Penalties
	Cory Levels (penalty scored); Peyton Roehnelt (penalty scored); Becca Jostes (penalty scored); Taylor Reynolds (penalty scored); Avery Anderson (penalty scored)		(penalty missed) Maggie Ethridge; (penalty scored) Jennifer Smith; (penalty scored) Nicole Wojcik; (penalty scored) Sophia Fabbro; (penalty scored) Mary Parker Powell

=== Semifinals ===
November 4, 2016	#2 Eastern Kentucky	0–0 (a.e.t.) (4–1 p)	#3 Tennessee Tech	Murray, Kentucky
11:00 a.m. CST		Report		Stadium: Cutchin Field; Referee: Keith Green
	Penalties
	Emmi Carroll (penalty scored); Kacy Eckley (penalty scored); Allison Werner (penalty scored); Larissa Heslop (penalty scored)		(penalty missed) Abi Gearing; (penalty scored) Rachel Blow; (penalty missed) Michaella Keyes

November 4, 2016	#1 Murray State	1–2 (a.e.t.)	#4 SIU Edwardsville	Murray, Kentucky
2:00 p.m. CST	Harriet Withers 65'	Report	Sydney Moore 57'; Peyton Roehnelt 100'	Stadium: Cutchin Field; Referee: Matt Drew

=== Final ===
November 6, 2016	#2 Eastern Kentucky	0–1	#4 SIU Edwardsville	Murray, Kentucky
1:00 p.m. CST		Report	Lindsey Fencel 3'	Stadium: Cutchin Field; Referee: Matt McIntire
