= George Allen Field =

Sports stadium in California

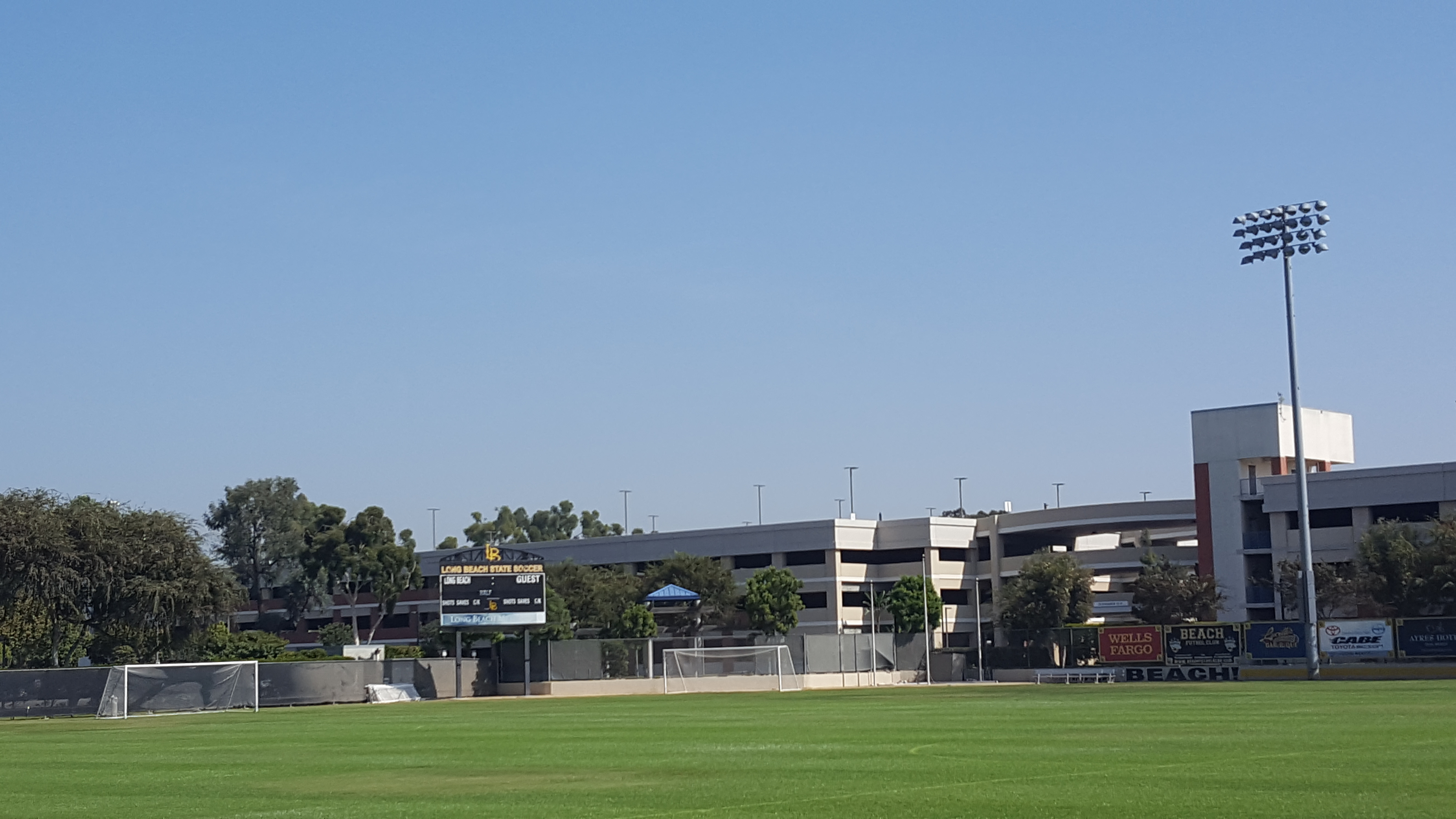
- View of the field in 2017
- Interactive map of George Allen Field
- Address: Long Beach, CA; United States
- Coordinates: 33.785871°N 118.110763°W
- Owner: California State University, Long Beach
- Operator: Beach Athletics
- Capacity: 1,000
- Type: Stadium
- Surface: Natural grass
- Scoreboard: Yes
- Field size: 75 x 115 yards
- Current use: Soccer

Construction
- Opened: August 1991; 35 years ago

Tenant
- Long Beach women's soccer

Website
- longbeachstate.com/george-allen-field

George Allen Field is a 1,000 seat soccer-specific stadium on the campus of California State University, Long Beach in Long Beach, California. Dedicated in August 1991, the stadium is named after Los Angeles Rams and Washington Redskins head coach George Allen.

== Overview ==
It is currently the home of the Long Beach State 49ers women's soccer team. The stadium was named after George Allen, a Pro Football Hall of Fame inductee who coached the Long Beach State football program for one season shortly before his death.

Despite the relative success of the women's soccer program, the program was still confined to George Allen Field. Men's volleyball head coach, Alan Knipe, had previously been in a similar situation with men's volleyball. Upon the completion of the Walter Pyramid, his program saw a sharp increase in recruiting and interest from prospects. This is the same situation that the women's soccer program was mired in and Knipe summed up the state of the field:

George Allen is our old football coach. That shows where our priority is with women's soccer.

— Alan Knipe, Daily 49er

In early 2009, the Beach Legacy Referendum, which in part was due to give Long Beach State a new 3,000 to 5,000 seat stadium, was defeated by the students with a vote of 3,912–2,615.

== Other uses ==
George Allen Field was used in the movie American Wedding, from the American Pie film series.
