= Jenna Szczesny =

American soccer player (born 1997)

Personal information
- Full name: Jenna Teresa-Marie Szczesny
- Date of birth: May 17, 1997 (age 29)
- Height: 5 ft 9 in (1.75 m)
- Position: Striker

College career
Years	Team	Apps	(Gls)
2015–2018	Loyola Ramblers	79	(32)

Senior career*
Years	Team	Apps	(Gls)
2019	Chicago Red Stars	2	(0)
- * Club domestic league appearances and goals

Jenna Teresa-Marie Szczesny (born May 17, 1997) is an American soccer player who last played as a striker for Chicago Red Stars of the National Women's Soccer League (NWSL).

== Club career ==
Chicago Red Stars drafted Szczesny in 2019.
