= Arkansas–Pine Bluff Golden Lions =

Arkansas–Pine Bluff Golden Lions and Golden Lady Lions
- University: University of Arkansas at Pine Bluff
- Conference: SWAC
- NCAA: Division I (FCS)
- Athletic director: Chris Robinson
- Location: Pine Bluff, Arkansas
- Varsity teams: 16 (8 men's and 8 women's)
- Football stadium: Simmons Bank Field
- Basketball arena: H.O. Clemmons Arena
- Baseball stadium: Torii Hunter Baseball Complex
- Softball stadium: Torii Hunter Softball Complex
- Volleyball arena: H.O. Clemmons Arena
- Nickname: Golden Lions
- Colors: Black and gold
- Website: uapblionsroar.com

The Arkansas–Pine Bluff Golden Lions (also UAPB) represent the University of Arkansas at Pine Bluff in Pine Bluff, Arkansas in intercollegiate athletics. They field sixteen teams including men and women's basketball, cross country, tennis, and indoor and outdoor track and field; women's-only softball, volleyball, and soccer; and men's-only baseball, football, and golf. The Golden Lions and Lady Lions compete in NCAA Division I and are members of the Southwestern Athletic Conference. Until 1972, the athletic program was known as the Arkansas AM&N Golden Lions.

== Sports sponsored ==
Men's sports	Women's sports
Baseball	Basketball
Basketball	Cross Country
Cross Country	Soccer
Football	Softball
Golf	Tennis
Tennis	Track & Field^{†}
Track & Field^{†}	Volleyball
† – Track and field includes both indoor and outdoor
