= Alabama State Hornets and Lady Hornets =

- University: Alabama State University
- Nickname: Hornets
- NCAA: Division I (FCS)
- Conference: Southwestern Athletic Conference
- Athletic director: Jason Cable
- Location: Montgomery, Alabama
- Varsity teams: 16
- Football stadium: ASU Stadium
- Basketball arena: Dunn–Oliver Acadome
- Baseball stadium: Wheeler-Watkins Baseball Complex
- Softball stadium: Barbara Williams Softball Complex
- Volleyball arena: Lockhart Gymnasium
- Colors: Black and old gold
- Mascot: Buzzy
- Website: bamastatesports.com
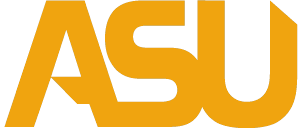

The Alabama State Hornets and Lady Hornets represent Alabama State University in Montgomery, Alabama in intercollegiate athletics. They field sixteen teams including men and women's basketball, cross country, golf, tennis, and track and field; women's-only bowling, soccer, softball, and volleyball; and men's-only baseball and football. The Hornets compete in the NCAA Division I and are members of the Southwestern Athletic Conference (SWAC). Adidas is the current sponsor of the Alabama State University Athletic Department.

== Teams ==
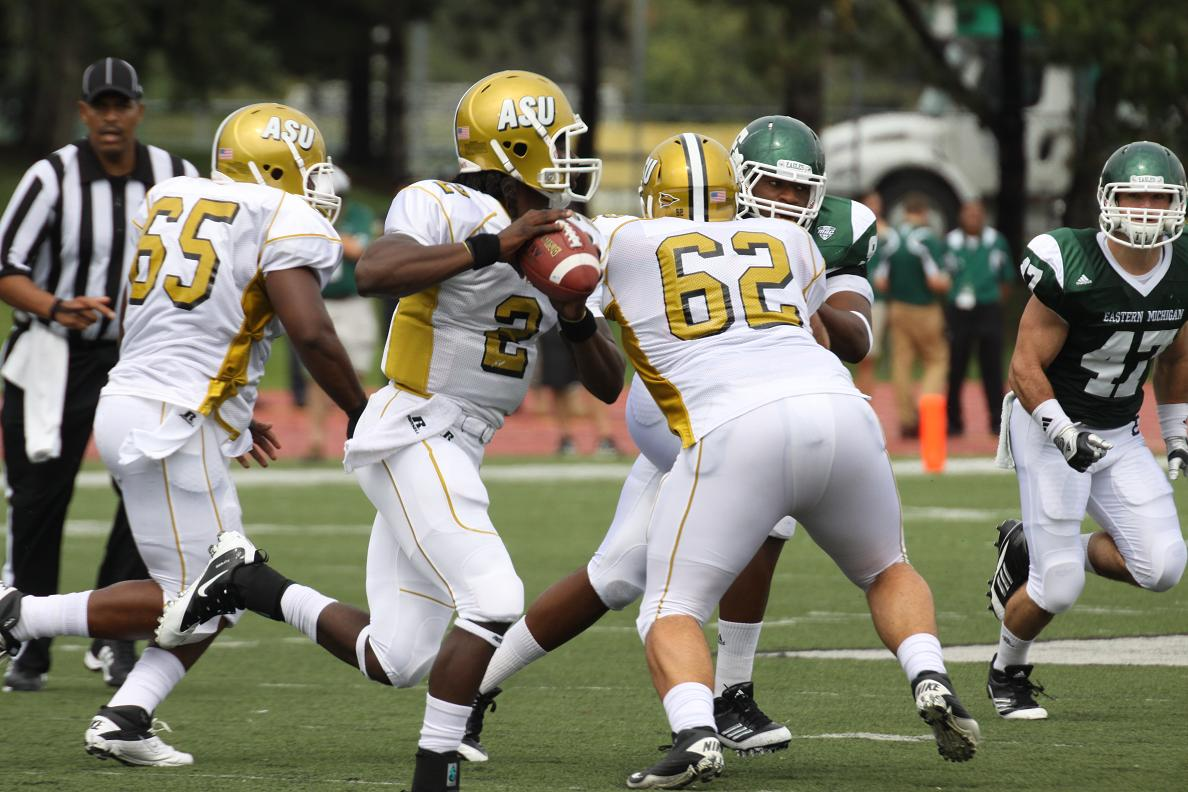
An Alabama State Hornets football game in 2011

Men's sports	Women's sports
Baseball	Basketball
Basketball	Bowling
Cross Country	Cross Country
Football	Golf
Golf	Soccer
Tennis	Softball
Track and field^{1}	Tennis
	Track and field^{1}
	Volleyball
^{1}indoor and outdoor

== See also ==
- Magic City Classic
