= 2016 Patriot League women's soccer season =

Patriot League
- Season: 2016

2016 Patriot League women's soccer standings
	Conf.						Overall
Team	W		L		T	PCT	W		L		T	PCT
Bucknell ‍†‍‡‍^{y}	8	–	1	–	0	.889	16	–	2	–	2	.850
Boston University ‍†‍‍	8	–	1	–	0	.889	9	–	11	–	1	.452
Lehigh ‍‍‍	5	–	3	–	1	.611	11	–	5	–	2	.667
Colgate ‍‍‍	5	–	4	–	0	.556	8	–	8	–	3	.500
Navy ‍‍‍	4	–	4	–	1	.500	9	–	11	–	2	.455
Lafayette ‍‍‍	3	–	5	–	1	.389	7	–	8	–	4	.474
Loyola (MD) ‍‍‍	2	–	4	–	3	.389	6	–	6	–	4	.500
Army ‍‍‍	2	–	5	–	2	.333	4	–	12	–	2	.278
Holy Cross ‍‍‍	2	–	5	–	2	.333	3	–	12	–	2	.235
American ‍‍‍	0	–	7	–	2	.111	1	–	16	–	2	.105
† – Conference champion ‡ – 2016 Patriot League tournament champion y – Invited to the NCAA Tournament; As of 17 Nov 2016; Rankings from NSCAA

The 2016 Patriot League women's soccer season was the 24th season of women's varsity soccer in the conference.

The Boston University Terriers are both the defending regular season and tournament champions.

== Changes from 2015 ==
- None

== Teams ==
=== Stadia and locations ===
Team	Location	Stadium	Capacity
American Eagles	Washington, D.C.	Reeves Field	1,000
Army Black Knights	West Point, New York	Clinton Field	1,000
Boston University Terriers	Boston, Massachusetts	Nickerson Field	10,412
Bucknell Bison	Lewisburg, Pennsylvania	Emmitt Field at Holmes Stadium	1,200
Colgate Raiders	Hamilton, New York	Van Doren Field	2,000
Holy Cross Crusaders	Worcester, Massachusetts	Linda Johnson Smith Soccer Stadium	1,320
Lafayette Leopards	Easton, Pennsylvania	Oaks Stadium	1,000
Lehigh Mountain Hawks	Bethlehem, Pennsylvania	Ulrich Sports Complex	4,000
Loyola Greyhounds	Baltimore, Maryland	Ridley Athletic Complex	6,000
Navy Midshipmen	Annapolis, Maryland	Glenn Warner Soccer Facility	1,600

== Regular season ==
=== Rankings ===
Legend
Increase in ranking
Decrease in ranking
Not ranked previous week

		Pre	Wk 2	Wk 3	Wk 4	Wk 5	Wk 6	Wk 7	Wk 8	Wk 9	Wk 10	Wk 11	Wk 12	Wk 13	Final
American	C	RV													
Army	C														
Boston University	C														
Bucknell	C														
Colgate	C														
Holy Cross	C														
Lafayette	C														
Lehigh	C														
Loyola	C														
Navy	C														

=== Results ===
Team/opponent	AME	ARM	BU	BCK	COL	HC	LAF	LEH	LOY	NVY
American Eagles										
Army Black Knights										
Boston University Terriers										
Bucknell Bison										
Colgate Raiders										
Holy Cross Crusaders										
Lafayette Leopards										
Lehigh Mountain Hawks										
Loyola Greyhounds										
Navy Midshipmen										

== Postseason ==
=== Patriot League tournament ===
Tournament details to be announced.

=== NCAA tournament ===
Seed	Region	School	1st round	2nd round	3rd round	Quarterfinals	Semifinals	Championship

== All-Patriot League awards and teams ==
2016 Patriot League Women's Soccer Individual Awards
Award	Recipient(s)
Offensive Player of the Year	
Coach of the Year	
Defensive Player of the Year	
Goalkeeper of the Year	
Freshman of the Year	

2016 Patriot League Women's Soccer All-Conference Teams
First Team	Second Team	Rookie Team

== See also ==
- 2016 NCAA Division I women's soccer season
- 2016 Patriot League Women's Soccer Tournament
- 2016 Patriot League men's soccer season
