= Patriot League women's soccer tournament =

- Conference soccer championship
- Sport: College soccer
- Conference: Patriot League
- Number of teams: 10 (league); 6 (tournament)
- Format: Single-elimination
- Current stadium: Campus sites
- Played: 1991–present
- Last contest: 2026
- Current champion: Boston University (6th title)
- Most championships: Colgate (11 titles)
- TV partner(s): ESPN+, CBS Sports Network
- Official website: patriotleague.org/wsoc

The Patriot League women's soccer tournament is the conference championship tournament in college soccer for the Patriot League. The tournament has been held every year since 1991. It is a single-elimination tournament with seeding based on conference records and the regular-season champion hosting the semifinal and final matches.

The field expanded from four to six teams when the league increased membership from eight to ten universities in 2013. The winner, declared conference champion, receives the conference's automatic bid to the NCAA Division I women's soccer championship.

== Key ==
Key

- (1) — Title number
- a.e.t. — Match went to extra time
- p – Match decided by a penalty shootout after extra time
- – Winning team also won regular season

== By Year ==
Year	Champion	Score	Runner-up	Venue / city	MVP	Ref.
1991	Colgate (1)	4–2 (a.e.t.)	Army	Clinton Field • West Point, NY	Caroline Chambers, Colgate	
1992	Colgate (2)	3–1	Army	Clinton Field • West Point, NY	Christy Flicker, Colgate	
1993	Army (1)	5–4 (a.e.t.)	Colgate	Varsity Field • Hamilton, NY	Tara Williams, Army	
1994	Colgate (3)	3–1	Army	Varsity Field • Hamilton, NY	Lindsay Barnett, Colgate	
1995	Colgate (4)	6–0	Navy	West Field • Lewisburg, PA	Jennifer Hughes, Colgate	
1996	Colgate (5)	3–2 (a.e.t.)	Army	Varsity Field • Hamilton, NY	Jennifer Hughes, Colgate	
1997	Colgate (6)	4–1	Army	Varsity Field • Hamilton, NY	Molly Ryan, Colgate	
1998	Colgate (7)	1–0	Navy	Dewey Field • Annapolis, MD	Angela Puliafico, Colgate	
1999	Colgate (8)	2–0	Navy	Van Doren Field • Hamilton, NY	Andrea Licari, Colgate	
2000	Holy Cross (1)	1–0	Colgate	Van Doren Field • Hamilton, NY	Colleen Cushing, Holy Cross	
2001	Bucknell (1)	2–1 (a.e.t.)	Navy	Warner Facility • Annapolis, MD	Lauren Schwarz, Bucknell	
2002	American (1)	2–1	Colgate	Clinton Field • West Point, NY	Anabel Jimenez, American	
2003	Navy (1)	4–1	American	Reeves Field • Washington, D.C.	Amelia Sheveland, Navy	
2004	Colgate (9)	2–0	Lehigh	Van Doren Field • Hamilton, NY	Kelly Kuss, Colgate	
2005	Bucknell (2)	3–1	Army	Ulrich Complex • Bethlehem, PA	Shannon Curd, Bucknell	
2006	Navy (2)	1–0	Colgate	Varsity Soccer Field • Lewisburg, PA	Shelly Moeller, Navy	
2007	Navy (3)	1–0	Bucknell	Varsity Soccer Field • Lewisburg, PA	Brigtte Fox, Navy	
2008	Army (2)	1–0 (a.e.t.)	Navy	Warner Facility • Annapolis, MD	Sarah Goss, Army	
2009	Colgate (10)	1–0 (a.e.t.)	American	Van Doren Field • Hamilton, NY	Jillian Arnault, Colgate	
2010	Lehigh (1)	1–0	Army	Clinton Field • West Point, NY	Lauren Mains, Lehigh	
2011	Army (3)	2–0	Navy	Van Doren Field • Hamilton, NY	Joey Molacek, Army	
2012	Colgate (11)	1–0	Navy	Glenn Warner Facility • Annapolis, MD	Ashley Walsh, Colgate	
2013	Boston University (1)	1–0	Navy	Glenn Warner Facility • Annapolis, MD	Andrea Green, Boston University	
2014	Boston University (2)	2–1	Colgate	Beyer-Small '76 Field • Hamilton, NY	Kai Miller, Boston University	
2015	Boston University (3)	1–0	Bucknell	Nickerson Field • Boston, MA	Clare Pleuler, Boston University	
2016	Bucknell (3)	2–1 (a.e.t.)	Boston University	Emmitt Field • Lewisburg, PA	Cora Climo, Bucknell	
2017	Bucknell (4)	3–2	Navy	Glenn Warner Facility • Annapolis, MD	Kendall Ham, Bucknell	
2018	Boston University (4)	1–0	Lehigh	Nickerson Field • Boston, MA	Anna Heilferty, Boston University	
2019	Navy (4)	2–1	Army	Glenn Warner Facility • Annapolis, MD	Carolyn Mang, Navy	
2020	Navy (5)	1–1 (4–1 p)	Colgate	Beyer-Small '76 Field • Hamilton, NY	Kristina Dzhandzhapanyan, Navy	
2021	Bucknell (5)	1–0	Boston University	Nickerson Field • Boston, MA	Teresa Deda, Bucknell	
2022	Bucknell (6)	0–0 (3–1 p)	Army	Clinton Field • West Point, NY	Rylee Donaldson, Bucknell	
2023	Bucknell (7)	0–0 (4–3 p)	Army	Clinton Field • West Point, NY	Jenna Hall, Bucknell	
2024	Boston University (5)	1–1 (8–7 p)	Bucknell	Emmitt Field • Lewisburg, PA	Morgan Weaver, Boston University	
2025	Army (4)	3–2	Boston University	Nickerson Field • Boston, MA	Sabrina Rogers, Army	
2026	Boston University (6)	2–1 (a.e.t.)	Navy	Glenn Warner Facility • Annapolis, MD	Kat Slott, Boston University	

== By school ==
As of 2026 tournament

School	Apps.	W	L	T	Pct.	Finals	Titles	Winning years
American	9	4	8	1	.346	3	1	2002
Army	27	21	18	5	.534	14	4	1993, 2008, 2011, 2025
Boston University	13	16	6	3	.700	9	6	2013, 2014, 2015, 2018, 2024, 2026
Bucknell	25	13	16	5	.453	10	7	2001, 2005, 2016, 2017, 2021, 2022, 2023
Colgate	31	28	17	4	.612	17	11	1991, 1992, 1994, 1995, 1996, 1997, 1998, 1999, 2004, 2009, 2012
Holy Cross	7	2	5	1	.313	1	1	2000
Lafayette	9	1	8	1	.111	0	0	—
Lehigh	12	6	8	2	.438	3	1	2010
Loyola (MD)	9	3	6	3	.375	0	0	—
Navy	27	19	21	2	.476	15	5	2003, 2006, 2007, 2019, 2020
