= Patriot League tournament =

Patriot League tournament or Patriot League championship may refer to:

- Patriot League baseball tournament
- Patriot League men's basketball tournament
- Patriot League women's basketball tournament
- Patriot League men's soccer tournament
- Patriot League women's soccer tournament

== See also ==
- Patriot League, which lists champions for sports not listed above
