= 2016 Patriot League women's soccer tournament =

- Classification: Division I
- Teams: 6
- Matches: 5
- Site: Emmitt Field; Lewisburg, Pennsylvania (Semifinals and Final)
- Champions: Bucknell (3rd title)
- Winning coach: Kelly Cook (1st title)

2016 Patriot League women's soccer standings
	Conf.						Overall
Team	W		L		T	PCT	W		L		T	PCT
Bucknell ‍†‍‡‍^{y}	8	–	1	–	0	.889	16	–	2	–	2	.850
Boston University ‍†‍‍	8	–	1	–	0	.889	9	–	11	–	1	.452
Lehigh ‍‍‍	5	–	3	–	1	.611	11	–	5	–	2	.667
Colgate ‍‍‍	5	–	4	–	0	.556	8	–	8	–	3	.500
Navy ‍‍‍	4	–	4	–	1	.500	9	–	11	–	2	.455
Lafayette ‍‍‍	3	–	5	–	1	.389	7	–	8	–	4	.474
Loyola (MD) ‍‍‍	2	–	4	–	3	.389	6	–	6	–	4	.500
Army ‍‍‍	2	–	5	–	2	.333	4	–	12	–	2	.278
Holy Cross ‍‍‍	2	–	5	–	2	.333	3	–	12	–	2	.235
American ‍‍‍	0	–	7	–	2	.111	1	–	16	–	2	.105
† – Conference champion ‡ – 2016 Patriot League tournament champion y – Invited to the NCAA Tournament; As of 17 Nov 2016; Rankings from NSCAA

The 2016 Patriot League women's soccer tournament was the postseason women's soccer tournament for the Patriot League held from November 1 to 6, 2016. The five match tournament was held at campus sites, with the semifinals and final held at Emmitt Field in Lewisburg, Pennsylvania. The six team single-elimination tournament consisted of three rounds based on seeding from regular season conference play. The Boston University Terriers were the defending tournament champions after defeating the Bucknell Bison in the championship match.

== Bracket ==
First round Tuesday, Nov. 1
3	Lehigh	0
6	Lafayette	1^{2OT}
4	Colgate	0
5	Navy	2

Semifinals; Friday, Nov. 4
1	Bucknell	2
6	Lafayette	0
2	Boston	2
5	Navy	1

Final; Sunday, Nov. 6
1	Bucknell	2^{OT}
2	Boston	1

== Schedule ==
=== First Round ===
November 1, 2016	#3 Lehigh	0–1 (a.e.t.)	#6 Lafayette	Bethlehem, Pennsylvania
7:00 p.m. EST		Report	Joanna Scotti 109'	Stadium: Ulrich Sports Complex; Referee: Mike DeFelice

November 1, 2016	#4 Colgate	0–2	#5 Navy	Hamilton, New York
7:00 p.m. EST		Report	Cat Macklin 4'; Ash Fairow 75'	Stadium: Beyer-Small Field; Referee: David Mon

=== Semifinals ===
November 4, 2016	#1 Bucknell	2–0	#6 Lafayette	Lewisburg, Pennsylvania
4:00 p.m. EST	Alexis Gannon 27'; Gabi Rosenfeld 68'	Report		Stadium: Emmitt Field; Referee: Jason Cullum

November 4, 2016	#2 Boston	2–1	#5 Navy	Lewisburg, Pennsylvania
7:00 p.m. EST	McKenna Doyle 80'; Julianna Chen 82'	Report	Ash Fairow 65'	Stadium: Emmitt Field; Referee: Mathew Richardson

=== Final ===
November 6, 2016	#1 Bucknell	2–1 (a.e.t.)	#2 Boston	Lewisburg, Pennsylvania
1:00 p.m. EST	Maddie Mulford 51'; Cora Climo 95'	Report	Ann Marie Jaworski 52'	Stadium: Emmitt Field; Referee: Sergio Gonzalez
