= 2023 Patriot League women's soccer tournament =

Postseason women's soccer tournament for the Patriot League

- Classification: Division I
- Teams: 6
- Matches: 5
- Attendance: 3,149
- Site: Campus Sites, Higher seed
- Champions: Bucknell (7th title)
- Winning coach: Kelly Cook (5th title)
- MVP: Jenna Hall (Bucknell)
- Broadcast: ESPN+

2023 Patriot League women's soccer standings
	Conf.						Overall
Team	W		L		T	PCT	W		L		T	PCT
Bucknell ‍‍‡‍^{y}	5	–	1	–	3	.722	12	–	4	–	5	.690
Army ‍†‍‍	6	–	2	–	1	.722	10	–	6	–	4	.600
Loyola (MD) ‍‍‍	6	–	3	–	0	.667	11	–	6	–	0	.647
Boston University ‍‍‍	4	–	3	–	2	.556	7	–	7	–	6	.500
Lehigh ‍‍‍	4	–	4	–	1	.500	7	–	5	–	4	.563
Holy Cross ‍‍‍	2	–	4	–	3	.389	4	–	7	–	5	.406
American ‍‍‍	3	–	5	–	1	.389	3	–	9	–	4	.313
Colgate ‍‍‍	3	–	5	–	1	.389	5	–	13	–	2	.300
Navy ‍‍‍	3	–	6	–	0	.333	9	–	7	–	3	.553
Lafayette ‍‍‍	3	–	6	–	0	.333	7	–	8	–	1	.469
† – Conference champion ‡ – 2023 Patriot League Tournament champion y – Invited to the NCAA Tournament; As of December 5, 2023; Rankings from United Soccer Coaches Poll; Source: Patriot League

The 2023 Patriot League women's soccer tournament was the postseason women's soccer tournament for the Patriot League held from October 29 through November 5, 2023. The tournament was held at campus sites, with the higher seeded team hosting. The six-team single-elimination tournament consisted of three rounds based on seeding from regular season conference play. The defending champions were the Bucknell Bison. Bucknell successfully defended their title, defeating regular season champions Army, who were the #1 seed, in a penalty shootout in the final. This was the second straight final that featured Bucknell and Army, with both going to penalties. The conference championship was the seventh for the Bucknell women's soccer program, five of which have come under head coach Kelly Cook. This was also the third straight championship for Bucknell. As tournament champions, Bucknell earned the Patriot League's automatic berth into the 2023 NCAA Division I Women's Soccer Tournament.

== Seeding ==
Seeding was based on regular season play with the top six teams qualifying for the tournament. The top two seeds received a bye to the Semifinals of the tournament and the higher seed hosted each match. A tiebreaker was required as Bucknell and Loyola Maryland both finished with eighteen points after conference play. Bucknell was awarded the second seed by virtue of their 1–0 regular season victory on October 11. A second tiebreaker was required to determine the final team in the tournament as American and Colgate both finished the season with ten points in conference play. Colgate was awarded the sixth and final seed by virtue of their 2–0 regular season victory on October 7.

Seed	School	Conference Record	Points
1	Army	6–2–1	19
2	Bucknell	5–1–3	18
3	Loyola Maryland	6–3–0	18
4	Boston University	4–3–2	14
5	Lehigh	4–4–1	13
6	Colgate	3–5–1	10

== Bracket ==
Quarterfinals; Sunday, Oct. 29
3	Loyola Maryland	0
6	Colgate	2
4	Boston University (pen.)	2 (2)
5	Lehigh	2 (1)

Semifinals; Thursday, Nov. 2
1	Army	1
6	Colgate	0
2	Bucknell	3
4	Boston University	1

Final; Sunday, Nov. 5
1	Army	0 (3)
2	Bucknell (pen.)	0 (4)

== Schedule ==
=== Quarterfinals ===
October 29	#4 Boston University	2–2 (a.e.t.) (2–1 p)	#5 Lehigh	Boston. MA
1:00 p.m. ET	Kayla Ross 11'; Giulianna Gianino 78' (pen.)	Report	31' Aminah Baruwa; 58' Boston University Own Goal; (yellow card) 78' Ryelle Shuey; (yellow card) 95' Faith Dobosiewicz	Stadium: Nickerson Field; Attendance: 188; Referee: Fabio Cardoso; Assistant referees: Michele Beagan; Shannon Malloy; Fourth official: Gus St. Silva
	Penalties
	Giulianna Gianino (penalty scored); Hugrun Helgadottir (penalty missed); Abigail McNulty (penalty missed); Margy Porta (penalty scored)		(penalty missed) Ryelle Shuey; (penalty scored) Emma Roesing; (penalty missed) Faith Dobosiewicz; (penalty missed) Alex Odle; (penalty missed) Ava Schaller

October 29	#3 Loyola (MD)	0–2	#6 Colgate	Baltimore, MD
2:00 p.m. ET	Payton Hurley (yellow card) 62'	Report	38' Ellie Stokes; 89' Ari Bezanson	Stadium: Ridley Athletic Complex; Attendance: 342; Referee: Marie Durr; Assistant referees: Ariel Raban; Marco Avila

=== Semifinals ===
November 2	#1 Army	1–0	#6 Colgate	West Point, NY
5:00 p.m. ET	Brigid Duffy 78'	Report		Stadium: Clinton Field; Attendance: 750; Referee: Thomas Snyder; Assistant referees: Danielle Cornetta; Alexandru Focea; Fourth official: Georgie Frascione

November 2	#2 Bucknell	3–1	#4 Boston University	Lewisburg, PA
7:00 p.m. ET	Teresa Deda 5', 49'; Meghan White 24'	Report	(yellow card) 30' Natalie Godoy; 90' Morgan Fagan	Stadium: Emmitt Field; Attendance: 1,019; Referee: Joshua Encarnacion; Assistant referees: Dustin Killick; Jessica Moretti; Fourth official: Jason Guernsey

=== Final ===
November 5	#1 Army	0–0 (a.e.t.) (3–4 p)	#2 Bucknell	West Point, NY
12:00 p.m. ET	Madison Niebish (yellow card) 29'; Team (yellow card) 86'; Jasmine Talley (yellow card) 98'	Report	(yellow card) 35' Kalli Wethern; (yellow card) 64' Paige Temple; (yellow card) 98' Eva Frankovic	Stadium: Clinton Field; Attendance: 850; Referee: Luis Arroyo; Assistant referees: Lauren Miller; Kenny Freeman; Fourth official: David Bork
	Penalties
	Kaelan Bradley (penalty missed); Cami Silvestro (penalty scored); Keira Vesy (penalty scored); Madison Niebish (penalty missed); Jasmine Talley (penalty scored); Kaitlin Palaian (penalty missed)		(penalty scored) Teresa Deda; (penalty scored) Meghan White; (penalty scored) Reese Evans; (penalty missed) Paige Temple; (penalty missed) Kelley Francis; (penalty scored) Kalli Wethern

== Statistics ==
=== Goalscorers ===
There were 11 goals scored in 5 matches, for an average of 2.2 goals per match (as of November 5, 2023).

2 goals

- Teresa Deda – Bucknell

1 goal

- Brigid Duffy – Army
- Morgan Fagan – Boston University
- Giulianna Gianino – Boston University
- Kayla Ross – Boston University
- Megan White – Bucknell
- Ari Bezanson – Colgate
- Ellie Stokes – Colgate
- Aminah Baruwa – Lehigh

1 own goal

- Boston University (vs. Lehigh)

== All-Tournament team ==
Player	Team
Kaelan Bradley	Army
Brigid Duffy	Army
Keira Vesy	Army
Celia Braun	Boston University
Giulianna Gianino	Boston University
Teresa Deda	Bucknell
**Jenna Hall**	Bucknell
Katie Schiano	Bucknell
Brooke Tracey	Bucknell
Alli Popham	Colgate
Lauren Rougas	Colgate

MVP in bold
