= 2016 BYU Cougars women's soccer team =

American college soccer season

2016 BYU Cougars women's soccer
- Conference: West Coast Conference

Ranking
- Coaches: No. 9
- Record: 18–3–1 (7–1–1 WCC)
- Head coach: Jennifer Rockwood
- Home stadium: South Stadium

Uniform
Home	Away

2016 West Coast Conference women's soccer standings
	Conf.						Overall
Team	W		L		T	PCT	W		L		T	PCT
No. 22 Pepperdine ‍†‍‍^{y}	7	–	1	–	1	.833	12	–	5	–	4	.667
No. 9 BYU ‍†‍‍^{y}	7	–	1	–	1	.833	18	–	3	–	1	.841
No. 17 Santa Clara ‍‍‍^{y}	6	–	2	–	1	.722	11	–	6	–	4	.619
Loyola Marymount ‍‍‍	6	–	3	–	0	.667	11	–	5	–	3	.658
San Diego ‍‍‍	5	–	4	–	0	.556	10	–	8	–	1	.553
Portland ‍‍‍	3	–	5	–	1	.389	9	–	7	–	3	.553
San Francisco ‍‍‍	3	–	6	–	0	.333	7	–	12	–	0	.368
Saint Mary's ‍‍‍	3	–	6	–	0	.333	5	–	13	–	2	.300
Gonzaga ‍‍‍	2	–	7	–	0	.222	6	–	10	–	2	.389
Pacific ‍‍‍	1	–	8	–	0	.111	1	–	15	–	1	.088
† – Conference champion y – Invited to the NCAA tournament As of 2016-12-14; Rankings from NSCAA

The 2016 BYU Cougars women's soccer team represented BYU during the 2016 NCAA Division I women's soccer season. The Cougars were coached for a 22nd consecutive season by Jennifer Rockwood, who was co-coach in 1995 and became the solo head coach in 1996. Before 1995 BYU women's soccer competed as a club team and not as a member of the NCAA. The Cougars entered the 2016 season having won four consecutive West Coast Conference championships and having made the NCAA Tournament each of the last four seasons and in 17 of the 21 seasons that Rockwood has been the head coach. The Cougars came off of a season were they advanced to the second round of the College Cup before being defeated by Stanford to finish the season 16–3–2. The Cougars split the WCC regular season title with Pepperdine and advanced to the third round of the NCAA College Cup before falling to South Carolina 1–0.

== Media ==
=== Television & Internet Streaming ===
Every BYU women's soccer game was shown live on BYUtv, TheW.tv, had a road television broadcast, or had a road internet stream. Information on these television broadcasts can be found under each individual match.

=== Nu Skin Cougar IMG Sports Network ===
For a third consecutive season the Cougar IMG Sports Network will air BYU Cougars women's soccer games. Greg Wrubell will provide play-by-play for most games with Robbie Bullough being the back-up play-by-play broadcaster. Former men's assistant coach Hugh Van Wagenen (typically home games) and Colette Smith (typically road games) will once again act as analysts. ESPN 960 and BYU Radio will act as the flagship stations for women's soccer.

== Schedule ==
*- Denotes WCC game
x- Denotes Cougar IMG Sports Network/ESPN 960 broadcast
y- Television Broadcast
z- Internet Stream

=== x-Exhibition: Blue/White Game ===
Two 35 minutes halves were played.
Broadcasters: Greg Wrubell & Hugh Van Wagenen (ESPN 960)

August 6, 2016	BYU White	3–0	BYU Blue	Provo, UT
	Ashley Hatch 23'; Brittain Dearden Steiner 38'; Madie Lyons 65'	Recap		Stadium: South Field; Attendance: N/A

=== x-Exhibition: Alumni Game ===
Two 40 minutes halves were played.
Broadcasters: Greg Wrubell, Cody John Walker (1st Half), & Jaleah Tuttle (2nd Half) (ESPN 960)

August 9, 2016	BYU Alumni	0–5	#16 BYU Cougars	Provo, UT
		Recap	Nadia Gomes 14'; Elena Medeiros 45'; Ashley Hatch 51'; Michele Vasconcelos 64'; Madie Siddoway 74'	Stadium: South Field; Attendance: N/A

=== x-Exhibition: UCLA ===
Series History: BYU leads series 2–1–1
Broadcasters: Greg Wrubell & Colette Smith (ESPN 960/BYU Radio)

August 13, 2016	#16 BYU Cougars	2–2	UCLA Bruins	Los Angeles, CA
4:01 p.m. PDT	Nadia Gomes 18', 23'; Danika Bowman (yellow card) 35'; Alyssa Jefferson (yellow card) 52'; Taylor Isom (yellow card) 83'	Recap	Annie Alvarado 7'; Zoey Goralski 25'; Kaiya McCullough (yellow card) 58'	Stadium: Drake Stadium; Attendance: 550; Referee: Ceciah Valero; Assistant referees: Salma Perez; Kira Helmer; Fourth official: Bernhard Hosu

=== xy-Washington State ===
Series History: BYU leads series 3–2–2
Broadcasters: Troy Clardy & Kyndra de St. Aubin (P12)
Greg Wrubell & Colette Smith (ESPN 960/BYU Radio)

August 19, 2016	#16 BYU Cougars	2–1	Washington State	Pullman, WA
7:06 p.m. PDT	Ashley Hatch 77' 105'	Recap	Kaitlyn Johnson 29'	Stadium: Lower Soccer Field; Attendance: 2,623; Referee: Jesus Cisneros; Assistant referees: RC Hefner; Saeed Askar

=== xy-Nebraska ===
Series History: Nebraska leads series 3–2–0
Broadcasters: Spencer Linton, Natalyn Lewis, & Lauren Francom (BYUtv)
Greg Wrubell & Hugh Van Wagenen (ESPN 960/BYU Radio)

August 22, 2016	Nebraska Cornhuskers	1–0	#16 BYU Cougars	Provo, UT
7:30 p.m. MDT	Haley Hanson 56'; Caroline Flynn (yellow card) 75'	Recap		Stadium: South Stadium; Attendance: 2,068; Referee: Brad Jensen; Assistant referees: T.J. Zablocki; Jay Hutchinson; Fourth official: Paul Burgess

=== xz-Penn State ===
Series History: BYU leads series 1–0–0
Broadcasters: No commentary (GoPSUnow)
Greg Wrubell & Colette Smith (ESPN 960/BYU Radio)

August 26, 2016	#14 BYU Cougars	3–2	#5 Penn State Nittany Lions	State College, PA
7:00 p.m. EDT	Ashley Hatch 6', 57', 78'	Recap	Frannie Crouse 62'; Charlotte Williams 67'	Stadium: Jeffrey Field; Attendance: 1,405; Referee: Lee Suckle; Assistant referees: Michael Matlock; Nuchael Gorsegner; Fourth official: Bruce Shanaman

=== xy-Tennessee ===
Series History: BYU leads series 2–1–0
Broadcasters: Spencer Linton, Natalyn Lewis, & Lauren Francom (BYUtv)
Greg Wrubell & Hugh Van Wagenen (ESPN 960/BYU Radio)

September 2, 2016	Tennessee Volunteers	2–5	#10 BYU Cougars	Provo, UT
7:05 p.m. MDT	Hannah Wilkinson 32', 80'; Mackenzie Gouner (yellow card) 67'	Recap	Ashley Hatch 2', 65'; Michele Vasconcelos 24', 86'; Elena Medeiros 32'; Jocelyn Loomis (yellow card) 79'	Stadium: South Stadium; Attendance: 4,210; Referee: Hamed Sadeghi; Assistant referees: Mitch Lillywhite; Blake Griffiths; Fourth official: Kali Smith

=== xy-Utah ===
Series History: BYU leads series 20–7–1
Broadcasters: Ann Schatz & Kyndra de St. Aubin (P12)
Greg Wrubell & Hugh Van Wagenen (ESPN 960/BYU Radio)

September 5, 2016	#10 BYU Cougars	2–0	Utah Utes	Salt Lake City, UT
3:30 p.m. MDT	Taylor Isom 21'; Ashley Hatch 61'	Recap		Stadium: Ute Field; Attendance: 2,064; Referee: Alex Chilowicz; Assistant referees: T.J. Zablocki; Jay Hutchinson; Fourth official: Jeff Young

=== xy-SMU ===
Series History: BYU leads series 3–0–0
Broadcasters: Spencer Linton, Natalyn Lewis, & Lauren Francom (BYUtv)
Greg Wrubell & Hugh Van Wagenen (ESPN 960/BYU Radio)

September 8, 2016	SMU Mustangs	0–4	#7 BYU Cougars	Provo, UT
7:05 p.m. MDT		Recap	Paige Barker 30'; Michele Vasconcelos 47', 71'; Elena Medeiros 49'	Stadium: South Stadium; Attendance: 1,838; Referee: Michael Radchuk; Assistant referees: Brad Jensen; Brandon Major; Fourth official: Allen Chapman

=== xz-Ohio State ===
Series History: First Meeting
Broadcasters: Kevin Neibecker & Nathan Rubinstein (BTN+)
Greg Wrubell & Colette Smith (ESPN 960/BYU Radio)

September 12, 2016	#7 BYU Cougars	3–0	#19 Ohio State Buckeyes	Columbus, OH
7 p.m. EDT	Michele Vasconcelos 8'; Nadia Gomes 56'; Ashley Hatch 62'	Recap		Stadium: Jesse Owens Memorial Stadium; Attendance: 1,079; Referee: Cory Richardson; Assistant referees: Rob Lowe; Eric Tattersall; Fourth official: Shane Richards

=== xz-Utah State ===
Series History: BYU leads series 12–0–0
Broadcasters: Chuck Longoria (MW Network)
Robbie Bullough & Hugh Van Wagenen (ESPN 960/BYU Radio)

September 17, 2016	#6 BYU Cougars	3–1	Utah State Aggies	Logan, UT
4 p.m. MDT	Ashley Hatch 9'; Michele Vasconcelos 24'; Nadia Gomes 52'	Recap	Jessica Brooksby 9'	Stadium: Chuck and Gloria Bell Soccer Field; Attendance: 1,945; Referee: Alex Jones; Assistant referees: Adam Sanchez; Hensen Keetch; Fourth official: Jim Ward

=== xz-Denver ===
Series History: BYU leads series 2–1–0
Broadcasters: Mitchell Marshall (TheW.tv)
Greg Wrubell & Hugh Van Wagenen (ESPN 960/BYU Radio)

September 22, 2016	Denver Pioneers	0–7	#4 BYU Cougars	Provo, UT
7:05 p.m. MDT		Recap	Ashley Hatch 5'; Elena Medeiros 8'; Michele Vasconcelos 16'; Nadia Gomes 29', 48'; Bizzy Phillips Bowen 53'; Elise Flake 90'	Stadium: South Stadium; Attendance: 1,427; Referee: Elijio Arreguin; Assistant referees: TJ Zablocki; Hamed Sadeghi; Fourth official: Paul Burgess

=== xy-Long Beach State ===
Series History: BYU leads series 6–2–0
Broadcasters: Spencer Linton, Natalyn Lewis, & Lauren Francom (BYUtv)
Robbie Bullough & Hugh Van Wagenen (ESPN 960/BYU Radio)

September 24, 2016	Long Beach State 49ers	0–1	#4 BYU Cougars	Provo, UT
8:05 p.m. MDT	Ashton McKeown (yellow card) 72'	Recap	Ashley Hatch 85'	Stadium: South Stadium; Attendance: 2,560; Referee: Luis Guardia; Assistant referees: Mitch Lillywhite; Karsten Gillwald; Fourth official: Brad Jensen

=== xy-Santa Clara* ===
Series History: Santa Clara leads series 6–1–3
Broadcasters: Jarom Jordan, Natalyn Lewis, & Lauren Francom (BYUtv)
Greg Wrubell & Hugh Van Wagenen (ESPN 960/BYU Radio)

September 29, 2016	Santa Clara Broncos	0–0	#3 BYU Cougars	Provo, UT
7:05 p.m. MDT	Kellie Peay (yellow card) 109'	Recap	Paige Barker (yellow card) 81'; Brynlee Welch (yellow card) 102'	Stadium: South Stadium; Attendance: 2,871; Referee: Brad Jensen; Assistant referees: Jeff Young; Jay Hutchinson; Fourth official: Allen Pickett

=== xy-San Francisco* ===
Series History: BYU leads series 5–1–0
Broadcasters: Spencer Linton, Natalyn Lewis, & Lauren Francom (BYUtv)
Greg Wrubell & Hugh Van Wagenen (ESPN 960/BYU Radio)

October 3, 2016	San Francisco Dons	0–4	#3 BYU Cougars	Provo, UT
5:35 p.m. MDT		Recap	Ashley Hatch 54', 55', 61'; Elena Medeiros 58'	Stadium: South Stadium; Attendance: 2,277; Referee: Daniel Radford; Assistant referees: Brandon Major; Kali Smith; Fourth official: Blake Griffiths

=== xy-Loyola Marymount* ===
Series History: BYU leads series 6–1–0
Broadcasters: Trey Bender & Cat Whitehill (ESPNU)
Greg Wrubell & Colette Smith (ESPN 960/BYU Radio)

October 6, 2016	#5 BYU Cougars	1–0	Loyola Marymount Lions	Los Angeles, CA
8:05 p.m. PDT	Michele Vasconcelos 9'	Recap		Stadium: Sullivan Field; Attendance: 702; Referee: Lucas Brooks; Assistant referees: Alex Gorin; Eduardo Jeff; Fourth official: Shea McNair

=== xz-Pepperdine* ===
Series History: BYU leads series 4–3–0
Broadcasters: Jen Karson (TheW.tv)
Robbie Bullough & Colette Smith (ESPN 960)

October 8, 2016	#5 BYU Cougars	0–1	#25 Pepperdine Waves	Malibu, CA
1 p.m. PDT	Michele Vasconcelos (yellow card) 75'	Recap	Bri Visalli 75' (pen.)	Stadium: Tari Frahm Rokus Field; Attendance: 403; Referee: Michael Zapata; Assistant referees: Jamie Padilla; Luis Gutierrez; Fourth official: Lexi Farmer

=== xy-Portland* ===
Series History: BYU leads series 6–4–0
Broadcasters: Spencer Linton, Natalyn Lewis, & Lauren Francom (BYUtv)
Greg Wrubell & Hugh Van Wagenen (ESPN 960/BYU Radio)

October 15, 2016	Portland Pilots	0–3	#8 BYU Cougars	Provo, UT
7:05 p.m. MDT		Recap	Michele Vasconcelos 6'; Nadia Gomes 58'; Bizzy Bowen 78'	Stadium: South Stadium; Attendance: 3,867; Referee: Jesus Cisneros; Assistant referees: T.J. Zablocki; Karsten Gillwald; Fourth official: Mike Anglin

=== xz-San Diego* ===
Series History: BYU leads series 6–2–0
Broadcasters: Jack Cronin (TheW.tv)
Greg Wrubell & Colette Smith (ESPN 960/BYU Radio)

October 21, 2016	#6 BYU Cougars	2–1	San Diego Toreros	San Diego, CA
7:00 p.m. PDT	Michele Vasconcelos 10'; Lizzy Braby 82'	Recap	Julia Sherwood 89'	Stadium: Torero Stadium; Attendance: 897; Referee: Jeff Arthurholtz; Assistant referees: Felisha Mariscal; Nathan Max; Fourth official: Alex Guerrero

=== xz-Saint Mary's* ===
Series History: BYU leads series 5–0–1
Broadcasters: Corey Crone & Anne Whipple (TheW.tv)
Greg Wrubell & Colette Smith (ESPN 960/BYU Radio)

October 27, 2016	#5 BYU Cougars	4–0	Saint Mary's Gaels	Moraga, CA
3:30 p.m. PDT	Ashley Hatch 20'; Elena Medeiros 24'; Michele Vasconcelos 57'; Jocelyn Loomis 86'	Recap	Valerie Laforge (yellow card) 72'	Stadium: Saint Mary's Stadium; Attendance: 201; Referee: Bernard Hosu; Assistant referees: Vince Cortes; Albert Montalvo; Fourth official: Benjamin Yates

=== xz-Pacific* ===
Series History: BYU leads series 6–1–0
Broadcasters: Paul Muyskens (YouTube)
Robbie Bullough & Colette Smith (ESPN 960/BYU Radio)

October 29, 2016	#5 BYU Cougars	4–0	Pacific Tigers	Stockton, CA
1:00 p.m. PDT	Ashley Hatch 18'; Avery Walker 38'; Jocelyn Loomis 44'; Michelle Vasconcelos 51'	Recap		Stadium: Knoles Field; Attendance: 327; Referee: Baldomero Toledo; Assistant referees: Veronica Perez; Michelle MacMullen; Fourth official: Eric Ehrhardt

=== xz-Gonzaga* ===
Series History: BYU leads series 8–0–0
Broadcasters: Robbie Bullough & Hugh Van Wagenen (TheW.tv/ESPN 960/BYU Radio)

November 5, 2016	Gonzaga Bulldogs	0–6	#4 BYU Cougars	Provo, UT
7:05 p.m. MDT		Recap	Paige Barker 12'; Michele Vasconcelos 18', 19'; Miranda Topham 37'; Nadia Gomes 54'; Ashley Hatch 72' (pen.)	Stadium: South Stadium; Attendance: 4,530; Referee: Younes Marrakchi; Assistant referees: Brad Jensen; Schuyler Pack; Fourth official: Blake Griffiths

=== xy-UNLV ===
Series History: BYU leads series 15–1–2
Broadcasters: Spencer Linton, Natalyn Lewis, & Lauren Francom (BYUtv)
Greg Wrubell & Hugh Van Wagenen (ESPN 960/BYU Radio)

November 11, 2016	UNLV Rebels	0–2	#4 BYU Cougars	Provo, UT
7:05 p.m. MST		Recap	Michele Vasconcelos 20'; Elena Medeiros 48'	Stadium: South Stadium; Attendance: 3,276; Referee: Brad Jensen; Assistant referees: Jay Hutchinson; Kristi Mak; Fourth official: Scott Conner

=== yz-Oklahoma ===
Series History: Series tied 1–1–0
Broadcasters: No commentary (ESPN3)
Greg Wrubell & Colette Smith (ESPN 960/BYU Radio)

November 17, 2016	#25 Oklahoma Sooners	1–2	#4 BYU Cougars	Columbia, SC
4:00 p.m. EST	Rachel Ressler 82'	Recap	Ashley Hatch 11'; Michele Vasconcelos 64'	Stadium: Stone Stadium; Attendance: 309; Referee: Kevin Broadley; Assistant referees: Gregory Brigman; Joshua Metcalf; Fourth official: Joseph Kirkpatrick

=== yz-South Carolina ===
Series History: First Meeting
Broadcasters: Brad Muller & Nancy Goffi (SEC+)
Robbie Bullough & Colette Smith (ESPN 960/BYU Radio)

November 19, 2016	#4 BYU Cougars	0–1	#3 South Carolina Gamecocks	Columbia, SC
7:00 p.m. EST	Nadia Gomes (yellow card) 76'	Recap	Wimone Wark (yellow card) 41'; Chelsea Drennan 69' (pen.)	Stadium: Stone Stadium; Attendance: N/A; Referee: Tori Penso; Assistant referees: Rick Rogers; Matt Jackson; Fourth official: Ashley Varnson

== Roster ==
No.	Position	Player	Height	Hometown	Year
1	GK	Rachel Boaz	5'10"	Murrieta, CA	Senior
2	D	Taylor Campbell Isom	5'7"	Sandy, UT	Junior
3	F	Carla Swensen Haslam	5'3"	South Jordan, UT	Junior
4	MF, D	Brittain Dearden Steiner	5'9"	Mercer, NJ	Junior
5	F	Elise Flake	5'7"	Mapleton, UT	Freshman
6	F	Nadia Gomes	5'6"	Sandy, UT	Junior
7	F, MF	Michele Murphy Vasconcelos	5'5"	Sandy, UT	RS Senior
8	D	Ella Johnson	5'10"	Centerville, UT	Junior
9	D, MF	Paige Hunt Barker	5'7"	Bountiful, UT	Senior
10	MF	Elisabeth "Bizzy" Phillips Bowen	5'4"	Sandy, UT	Junior
11	GK	Hannah Clark	5'10"	Danville, CA	RS Junior
12	D	Avery Calton Walker	5'7"	Ogden, UT	RS Junior
14	D	Danika Bowman	5'7"	Redlands, CA	Freshman
16	MF	Kayci Griffin	5'9"	Austin, TX	Junior
18	GK	Sabrina Macias	5'5"	Littleton, CO	RS Freshman
19	MF	Lizzy Braby	5'2"	Murray, UT	Freshman
20	F, MF	Jocelyn Loomis	5'4"	Sandy, UT	Junior
21	MF	Madie Siddoway	5'9"	North Logan, UT	Sophomore
22	MF, D	Miranda Bailey Topham	5'7"	Loomis, CA	RS Senior
23	MF	Rachel Bingham	5'7"	Spanish Fork, UT	Sophomore
24	MF	Stephanie Ringwood Ney	5'9"	Cottonwood Heights, UT	Junior
25	D	Brynlee Welch	5'4"	Hyrum, UT	Freshman
26	F	Madie Lyons	5'8"	Sandy, UT	Junior
27	MF	Elena Medeiros	5'3"	Bountiful, UT	Senior
29	D	Alyssa Jefferson	5'5"	Sandy, UT	Freshman
32	GK	Cassidy Smith	5'10"	Alpine, UT	RS Freshman
33	F	Ashley Hatch	5'9"	Gilbert, AZ	Senior
34	MF	Brianna Hatch	5'8"	Gilbert, AZ	Sophomore

== Rankings ==
+ Regular season polls	Poll	Pre- Season	Week 1	Week 2	Week 3	Week 4	Week 5	Week 6	Week 7	Week 8	Week 9	Week 10	Week 11	Week 12 Postseason	Final
NSCAA Coaches	16	14	10	7	6	4	3	5	8	6	5	4	4	9	
Soccer America	16	13	12	9	8	7	5	8	11	9	8	6	6	6	
Top Drawer Soccer	17	14	16	15	6	5	2	3	7	6	5	5	3	10	
Hero Sports	13	10	10	9	6	2	2	3	3	2	3	3	2	4	

Legend
	Increase in ranking
	Decrease in ranking
	Not ranked previous week
(RV)	Received Votes
