= 2024 Patriot League women's soccer tournament =

Postseason women's soccer tournament for the Patriot League

- Classification: Division I
- Teams: 6
- Matches: 5
- Attendance: 2,087
- Site: Campus Sites, Higher seed
- Champions: Boston University (5th title)
- Winning coach: Casey Brown (1st title)
- MVP: Morgan Weaver (Boston University)
- Broadcast: ESPN+ (First Round & Semifinals); CBS Sports Network (Final)

2024 Patriot League women's soccer standings
	Conf.						Overall
Team	W		L		T	PCT	W		L		T	PCT
Bucknell ‍†‍‍	7	–	2	–	0	.778	12	–	4	–	3	.711
Boston U ‍‍‡‍^{y}	5	–	0	–	4	.778	6	–	8	–	7	.452
Army ‍‍‍	5	–	3	–	1	.611	12	–	6	–	1	.658
Loyola (MD) ‍‍‍	3	–	3	–	3	.500	8	–	6	–	5	.553
Colgate ‍‍‍	3	–	3	–	3	.500	5	–	10	–	4	.368
Navy ‍‍‍	3	–	4	–	2	.444	9	–	10	–	2	.476
Lafayette ‍‍‍	2	–	3	–	4	.444	5	–	6	–	4	.467
American ‍‍‍	2	–	5	–	2	.333	6	–	6	–	3	.500
Holy Cross ‍‍‍	2	–	5	–	2	.333	5	–	11	–	2	.333
Lehigh ‍‍‍	2	–	6	–	1	.278	3	–	9	–	5	.324
† – Conference champion ‡ – 2024 Patriot League Tournament champion y – Invited to the NCAA Tournament; As of December 10, 2024; Rankings from United Soccer Coaches Poll; Source:Patriot League

The 2024 Patriot League women's soccer tournament was the postseason women's soccer tournament for the Patriot League held from November 3 through November 10, 2024. The tournament was held at campus sites, with the higher seeded team hosting. The six-team single-elimination tournament consisted of three rounds based on seeding from regular season conference play. The defending champions were the Bucknell Bison. Bucknell entered the tournament as the first seed and qualified for the Final. However, they were unable to defend their title as the fell to second seed Boston University 8–7 in a penalty shootout in the final. The conference championship was the fifth for the Boston University women's soccer program, and first for head coach Casey Brown. As tournament champions, Boston University earned the Patriot League's automatic berth into the 2024 NCAA Division I women's soccer tournament.

== Seeding ==
Seeding was based on regular season play with the top six teams qualifying for the tournament. The top two seeds received a bye to the Semifinals of the tournament and the higher seed hosted each match. A tiebreaker was required to determine the fourth and fifth seeds as Colgate and Loyola both finished with 3–3–3 regular season records. The two teams drew their regular season match-up on October 5, 1–1. After further tiebreakers it was determined that Loyola was the fourth seed and Colgate was the fifth seed.

Seed	School	Conference Record	Points
1	Bucknell	7–2–0	21
2	Boston University	5–0–4	19
3	Army	5–3–1	16
4	Loyola	3–3–3	12
5	Colgate	3–3–3	12
6	Navy	3–4–2	8

== Bracket ==
Quarterfinals; Sunday, Nov. 3
4	Loyola	3
5	Colgate	0
3	Army	1
6	Navy	0

Semifinals; Thursday, Nov. 7
1	Bucknell	4
4	Loyola	0
2	Boston University (a.e.t.)	2
3	Army	1

Final; Sunday, Nov. 10
1	Bucknell	1 (7)
2	Boston University (pen.)	1 (8)

== Schedule ==
=== Quarterfinals ===
November 3, 2024	#3 Army	1–0	#6 Navy	West Point, NY
1:00 p.m. EST	Hannah Pohidal 84'; Keira Vesy (yellow card) 87'			Stadium: Clinton Field; Attendance: 400; Referee: Fabio Cardoso; Assistant referees: Ignacio Guzman; David Bosak; Fourth official: Jennifer Dumaine

November 3, 2024	#4 Loyola	3–0	#5 Colgate	Baltimore, MD
2:00 p.m. EST	Daylee DeSmit 16', 49'; Olivia Quaranta 32', (yellow card) 47'; Michaela Virgin (yellow card) 86'	Report	(yellow card) 67' Madison Isaacs	Stadium: Ridley Athletic Complex; Attendance: 350; Referee: Alla Stepanov; Assistant referees: Audrey Smylie; Paolo Cardella; Fourth official: Ariel Raban

=== Semifinals ===
November 7, 2024	#2 Boston University	2–1 (a.e.t.)	#3 Army	Boston, MA
6:00 p.m. EST	Fagan Morgan 68'; Margy Porta 109'	Report	29' (pen.) Kaelan Bradley; (yellow card) 61' Brigid Duffy	Stadium: Nickerson Field; Attendance: 316; Referee: Jose Mendes; Assistant referees: Syrus Ataii; Jill Canelli; Fourth official: Augusto St. Silva

November 7, 2024	#1 Bucknell	4–0	#4 Loyola	Lewisburg, PA
7:00 p.m. EST	Katie Connell 15'; Sydney Hess 35', (yellow card) 56'; Paige Temple 50'; Teresa Deda 60', (yellow card) 79'	Report	(yellow card) 81' Michaela Virgin; (yellow card) 89' Olivia Quaranta	Stadium: Emmitt Field; Attendance: 250; Referee: Nicolas Lopez Sanche; Assistant referees: Dustin Killick; Danielle Cornetta; Fourth official: Cody Hack

=== Final ===
November 10, 2024	#1 Bucknell	1–1 (a.e.t.) (7–8 p)	#2 Boston University	Lewisburg, PA
12:30 p.m. EST	Sydney Hess 67'; Katie Connell (yellow card) 69'	Report	(yellow card) 33' Bridget Carr; (yellow card) 49' Allison Hanlon; (yellow card) 85' Helene Tyburczy; 86' Morgan Weaver	Stadium: Emmitt Field; Attendance: 771; Referee: Luis Diego Arroyo; Assistant referees: Catherine Koenig; Elena Dauphinais; Fourth official: Jason Guernsey
	Penalties
	Teresa Deda (penalty scored); Meghan White (penalty missed); Reese Evans (penalty missed); Katie Connell (penalty scored); Kalli Wethern (penalty scored); Ashley Kozlowski (penalty scored); Riley Hayes (penalty scored); Laura Schmidt (penalty scored); Kelley Francis (penalty scored); Presley Sutter (penalty missed)		(penalty scored) Giulianna Gianino; (penalty scored) Samantha Aronson; (penalty scored) Hugrun Helgadottir; (penalty missed) Allison Hanlon; (penalty missed) Margy Porta; (penalty scored) Kat Slott; (penalty scored) Helene Tyburczy; (penalty scored) Morgan Fagan; (penalty scored) Mackenzi Stickelman; (penalty scored) Gianna Savella

== Statistics ==
=== Goalscorers ===
There were 13 goals scored in 5 matches, for an average of 2.6 goals per match (as of November 10, 2024).

2 goals

- Daylee DeSmit – Loyola
- Sydney Hess – Bucknell

1 goal

- Kaelan Bradley – Army
- Katie Connell – Bucknell
- Teresa Deda – Bucknell
- Fagan Morgan – Boston University
- Hannah Pohidal – Army
- Margy Porta – Boston University
- Olivia Quaranta – Loyola
- Paige Temple – Bucknell
- Morgan Weaver – Boston University

== All-Tournament team ==
Player	Team
Kaelan Bradley	Army
Sage Strohman	Army
Morgan Fagan	Boston University
Lily Matthews	Boston University
Mackenzie Stickelman	Boston University
**Morgan Weaver**	Boston University
Jess Benattar	Bucknell
Sydney Hess	Bucknell
Laura Schmidt	Bucknell
Baylee DeSmit	Loyola
Olivia Quaranta	Loyola

MVP in bold
