= Giulianna Gianino =

American soccer player (born 2004)

Personal information
- Date of birth: January 15, 2004 (age 22)
- Height: 5 ft 3 in (1.60 m)
- Position: Midfielder

Team information
- Current team: Dallas Trinity
- Number: 15

Youth career
- South Shore Select

College career
Years	Team	Apps	(Gls)
2022–2025	Boston University Terriers	80	(25)

Senior career*
Years	Team	Apps	(Gls)
2026–	Dallas Trinity	0	(0)
- * Club domestic league appearances and goals as of 05:31, September 30, 2026 (UTC)

Giulianna Gianino (born January 15, 2004) is an American professional soccer player who plays as a midfielder for USL Super League club Dallas Trinity FC. She played college soccer for the Boston University Terriers, where she was named the 2025 Patriot League Midfielder of the Year after leading the nation in assists per game.

== Early life ==
Gianino grew up in Norwell, Massachusetts, as one of three children born to Amy and John Gianino. She played prep soccer as a freshman and senior at Norwell High School, contributing to Division III state titles in both years. As a freshman, she recording 8 goals in the state semifinals, including a hat-trick in the semifinal. She was named the league MVP in her senior year after registering 16 goals and 12 assists. Gianino played club soccer for South Shore Select, where she was a club captain and contributed to two NPL national championships.

== College career ==
In 2022, Gianino enrolled in Boston University, the alma mater of her uncle. She scored her first two collegiate goals in her second and third career matches with the Terriers, including an equalizer against Providence with less than four minutes left on the clock. She was the Patriot League Rookie of the Year and an all-league second-team honoree after starting all 20 games as a freshman. In her sophomore year in 2023, Gianino was named to the All-Patriot League first team and Patriot League All-Tournament team; she also led the Terriers in goals and assists. As a junior, Gianino opened the season with 3 goals scored across Boston University's opening five matches. She then went on to rank fourth in the Patriot League with 8 goals scored, and was named first-team All-Patriot for the second year in a row. She helped the Terriers claim the Patriot League tournament title, playing all 110 minutes of a penalty shootout win over Bucknell in the final.

Gianino completed her collegiate career with a senior season in which she was named the Patriot League Midfielder of the Year and became a first-team All-Patriot honoree for the third time. Her efforts contributed to a regular season title for the Terriers and a trip to the Patriot League tournament championship match, where she registered an assist in a loss to Army West Point on November 9, 2025; she was named to the all-tournament team at the conclusion of the competition. Gianino's 15 assists on the year led the league, and her 0.79 assists per game record was the highest in the NCAA. She left Boston University having racked up 25 career assists, tying for the highest number in program history.

== Club career ==
On September 22, 2026, USL Super League club Dallas Trinity FC announced the signing of Gianino to her first professional contract through the 2027 season.

== Honors and awards ==
Boston University Terriers

- Patriot League: 2025
- Patriot League tournament: 2024

Individual

- Patriot League Midfielder of the Year: 2025
- Patriot League Rookie of the Year: 2022
- First-team All-Patriot League: 2023, 2024, 2025
- Second-team All-Patriot League: 2022
- Patriot League tournament All-Tournament team: 2023, 2025
