= 2016 NCAA Division I women's soccer rankings =

- Season: 2016
- NCAA tournament: 2016
- Preseason No. 1: Florida State (NSCAA Coaches); Stanford (Top Drawer Soccer, Soccer America); Penn State (Hero Sports)
- NCAA Tournament Champions: USC
NCAA Division I women's soccer rankings


Four polls make up the 2016 NCAA Division I women's soccer rankings, the NSCAA Coaches Poll, the Soccer America Poll, the Top Drawer Soccer Poll, and the Hero Sports soccer poll. They represent the ranking system for the 2016 NCAA Division I women's soccer season.

== Legend ==
	Increase in ranking
	Decrease in ranking
	Not ranked previous week
Italics	Number of first place votes
(#–#–#)	Win–loss–tie record
т	Tied with team above or below also with this symbol

== NSCAA Coaches ==
	Preseason Aug. 2	Week 1 Aug. 23	Week 2 Aug. 30	Week 3 Sept. 6	Week 4 Sept. 13	Week 5 Sept. 20	Week 6 Sept. 27	Week 7 Oct. 4	Week 8 Oct. 11	Week 9 Oct. 18	Week 10 Oct. 25	Week 11 Nov. 1	Week 12 Nov. 8	Final Dec. 6	
1.	Florida State (18)	Florida State (22) (1–0–0)	Florida State (24) (3–0–0)	Florida State (22) (3–1–0)	Stanford (16) (6–0–1)	Stanford (28) (7–0–1)	Stanford (27) (8–0–1)	Stanford (29) (10–0–1)	West Virginia (17) (12–1–1)	West Virginia (22) (13–1–1)	West Virginia (22) (15–1–1)	West Virginia (22) (16–1–1)	West Virginia (23) (19–1–1)	USC (30) (19–4–2)	1.
2.	Penn State (10)	Duke (2) (2–0–0)	Stanford (5) (3–0–0)	Stanford (8) (5–0–0)	West Virginia (6) (6–0–1)	Virginia (1) (8–1–0)	Florida State (1) (8–1–1)	Florida State (1) (9–1–1)	South Carolina (6) (13–0–1)	South Carolina (5) (14–0–1)	South Carolina (4) (16–0–1)	South Carolina (3) (17–0–1)	Stanford (5) (17–1–1)	West Virginia (23–2–2)	2.
3.	Duke (2)	Stanford (5) (2–0–0)	Virginia (1) (4–0–0)	Virginia (1) (6–0–0)	Florida State (8) (5–1–0)	Florida State (2) (7–1–0)	BYU (3) (9–1–0)	West Virginia (10–1–1)	Stanford (6) (11–1–1)	Stanford (2) (12–1–1)	Stanford (3) (14–1–1)	Stanford (4) (16–1–1)	South Carolina (18–1–1)	Georgetown (20–3–3)	3.
4.	Virginia	Virginia (1) (1–0–0)	West Virginia (1) (3–0–1)	West Virginia (5–0–1)	Florida (1) (5–1–0)	BYU (7–1–0)	West Virginia (8–1–1)	South Carolina (1) (11–0–1)	Duke (10–2–2)	Duke (11–2–2)	USC (1) (13–3–0)	BYU (1) (15–2–1)	BYU (2) (16–2–1)	North Carolina (1) (17–4–4)	4.
5.	Stanford	Penn State (1) (1–0–1)	Florida (3–1–0)	Florida (4–1–0)	Virginia (7–1–0)	West Virginia (7–1–1)	South Carolina (10–0–1)	BYU (9–1–1)	Virginia (10–2–2)	USC (11–3–0)	BYU (13–2–1)	USC (14–3–1)	Georgetown (16–2–3)	South Carolina (21–2–1)	5.
6.	West Virginia	Florida (2–0–0)	Clemson (3–1–0)	Duke (4–1–1)	BYU (6–1–0)	Georgetown (8–1–0)	Georgetown (8–1–1)	Georgetown (9–1–1)	USC (10–3–0)	BYU (1) (12–2–1)	Duke (12–3–2)	Notre Dame (13–2–4)	North Carolina (13–3–4)	Stanford (18–2–1)	6.
7.	Florida	West Virginia (1–0–1)	Duke (3–1–0)	BYU (4–1–0)	North Carolina (5–1–1)	Duke (6–2–1)	Virginia (8–2–1)	USC (9–2–0)	Georgetown (9–2–2)	Georgetown (12–1–2)	Virginia (12–3–2)	Georgetown (14–2–2)	USC (14–4–1)	Duke (15–5–3)	7.
8.	Texas A&M	Clemson (2–0–0)	North Carolina (3–0–0)	North Carolina (4–0–1)	Texas A&M (5–2–0)	South Carolina (8–0–1)	Minnesota (9–2–1)	Virginia (8–2–2)	BYU (1) (11–2–1)	Virginia (10–3–2)	Florida State (12–2–2)	Minnesota (14–3–3)	Minnesota (16–3–3)	Auburn (17–7–0)	8.
9.	North Carolina	North Carolina (2–0–0)	Minnesota (4–0–0)	UCLA (3–1–0)	Duke (5–2–1)	Minnesota (7–2–1)	USC (7–2–0)	Duke (8–2–2)	Florida State (9–2–2)	Florida State (10–2–2)	UCLA (12–3–1)	Clemson (13–3–3)	Florida (15–4–1)	BYU (18–3–1)	9.
10.	Rutgers	Connecticut (2–0–0)	BYU (2–1–0)	Minnesota (5–1–0)	Minnesota (6–2–0)	USC (6–2–0)	Duke (7–2–2)	UCLA (9–2–0)	Cal (11–2–1)	Cal (12–2–1)	Georgetown (13–2–2)	North Carolina (12–3–3)	Florida State (13–3–4)	Florida (17–5–1)	10.
11.	USC	Texas A&M (1–1–0)	UCLA (2–1–0)	Texas A&M (4–2–0)	UCLA (4–2–0)	UCLA (6–2–0)	UCLA (7–2–0)	Arkansas (12–1–0)	North Carolina (8–2–3)	Auburn (11–4–0)	Minnesota (12–3–3)	Auburn (13–5–0)	Notre Dame (13–3–4)	Virginia (15–5–2)	11.
12.	Auburn	Notre Dame (2–0–0)	Rutgers (3–0–1)	Cal (5–1–0)	USC (5–2–0)	Florida (6–2–0)	Arkansas (11–1–0)	Clemson (8–2–2)	Arkansas (13–2–0)	UCLA (10–3–1)	Notre Dame (11–2–4)	Duke (12–4–3)	Clemson (13–4–3)	Clemson (14–5–4)	12.
13.	Notre Dame	Santa Clara (2–0–0)	Penn State (1–1–1)	Clemson (3–2–0)	Clemson (5–2–0)	Clemson (7–2–0)	Clemson (8–2–1)	Penn State (8–2–2)	Auburn (10–4–0)	Minnesota (12–3–2)	Auburn (12–5–0)	Florida State (12–3–3)	Connecticut (18–2–1)	UCLA (15–5–2)	13.
14.	Clemson	BYU (1–0–0)	Texas A&M (2–2–0)	South Florida (5–0–0)	South Carolina (6–0–1)	Texas A&M (7–2–0)	Penn State (7–2–2)	Cal (10–2–0)	UCLA (9–3–1)	Notre Dame (10–3–2)	Clemson (12–3–2)	Virginia (13–4–2)	Duke (12–4–3)	Florida State (14–4–4)	14.
15.	Connecticut	UCLA (1–0–0)	Texas Tech (3–0–1)	South Carolina (4–0–2)	South Florida (7–0–0)	Arkansas (9–1–0)	South Florida (8–0–0)	North Carolina (6–2–3)	Minnesota (11–3–1)	Arkansas (13–3–0)	Pepperdine (11–3–3)	Florida (13–4–0)	Virginia (13–4–2)	Minnesota (16–3–4)	15.
16.	BYU	Texas Tech (2–0–0)	Virginia Tech (4–0–0)	Penn State (2–2–1)	Penn State (4–2–1)	Penn State (5–2–2)	North Carolina (6–2–2)	Florida (8–3–0)	Penn State (9–2–3)	Penn State (10–2–4)	North Carolina (10–3–3)	Connecticut (16–2–1)	Auburn (14–6–0)	Utah (13–4–5)	16.
17.	Virginia Tech	Minnesota (2–0–0)	Arkansas (4–0–0)	Connecticut (5–1–0)	Virginia Tech (7–1–0)	South Florida (7–0–0)	Cal (8–2–0)	Minnesota (9–3–1)	Florida (10–3–0)	Clemson (10–3–2)	Florida (12–4–0)	Northwestern (14–1–4)	Arkansas (17–5–0)	Santa Clara (12–7–4)	17.
18.	Cal	Virginia Tech (2–0–0)	Connecticut (3–1–0)	Virginia Tech (5–1–0)	Georgetown (6–1–0)	North Carolina (5–2–1)	Florida (7–3–0)	Auburn (8–4–0)	Clemson (9–3–2)	North Carolina (8–3–3)	Cal (12–2–2)	UCLA (12–5–1)	UCLA (13–5–1)	Northwestern (16–3–4)	18.
19.	Texas Tech	Ole Miss (2–0–0)	Cal (3–1–0)	Ohio State (5–1–0)	Ohio State (6–2–0)	Virginia Tech (8–2–0)	Rutgers (7–1–2)	Michigan (9–1–1)	Pepperdine (8–3–3)	Pepperdine (9–3–3)	Connecticut (14–2–1)	Arkansas (15–4–0)	Pepperdine (12–4–3)	Arkansas (18–5–1)	19.
20.	Arizona	Pepperdine (2–0–0)	South Florida (4–0–0)	Notre Dame (5–1–0)	Notre Dame (5–1–2)	Cal (7–2–0)	Auburn (7–4–0)	Notre Dame (8–1–3)	Notre Dame (9–2–3)	Florida (10–4–0)	Northwestern (13–1–3)	Pepperdine (11–4–3)	Colorado (14–5–1)	Connecticut (19–3–1)	20.
21.	Santa Clara	Cal (1–1–0)	Auburn (3–1–0)	Pepperdine (4–2–0)	Cal (6–2–0)	Northwestern (9–0–0)	Connecticut (8–2–0)	Connecticut (10–2–0)	Connecticut (11–2–1)	Connecticut (13–2–1)	Penn State (10–3–4)	Cal (13–4–2)	Northwestern (14–2–4)	Notre Dame (13–3–5)	21.
22.	Ole Miss	Rutgers (1–0–1)	Santa Clara (2–2–0)	Texas Tech (4–1–1)	Rutgers (5–1–1)	Rutgers (6–1–1)	Notre Dame (7–1–3)	Oklahoma (10–3–1)	Northwestern (12–1–1)	Colorado (12–3–0)	Colorado (12–4–0)	Colorado (14–5–0)	Rutgers (11–4–6)	Pepperdine (12–5–4)	22.
23.	Ohio State	South Florida (2–0–0)	Notre Dame (3–1–0)	Rutgers (3–1–1)	Connecticut (6–2–0)	Connecticut (7–2–0)	Oklahoma (9–2–1)	South Florida (9–1–0)	Colorado (10–3–1)	Northwestern (13–1–2)	Arkansas (14–4–0)	Utah (11–3–4)	Utah (11–3–5)	Colorado (15–6–1)	23.
24.	South Carolina	Auburn (1–1–0)	Northwestern (3–0–0)	Northwestern (5–0–0)	Texas Tech (6–1–1)	Notre Dame (6–1–2)	Northwestern (10–1–0)	Rutgers (8–2–2)	Virginia Tech (10–4–1)	Baylor (11–4–1)	Oklahoma (12–4–2)	Kansas (10–4–4)	Cal (13–5–2)	NC State (11–9–2)	24.
25.	Loyola Marymount	Northwestern (2–0–0)	Pepperdine (3–1–0)	Arkansas (5–1–0)	Pepperdine (4–2–1)	Texas Tech (7–1–2)	Pepperdine (5–3–2)	Pepperdine (6–3–3)	Michigan (9–3–1)	Virginia Tech (10–4–2)	Kansas (8–4–5)	Rutgers (10–3–6)	Oklahoma (13–6–2)	Rutgers (12–5–6)	25.
	Preseason Aug. 2	Week 1 Aug. 23	Week 2 Aug. 30	Week 3 Sept. 6	Week 4 Sept. 13	Week 5 Sept. 20	Week 6 Sept. 27	Week 7 Oct. 4	Week 8 Oct. 11	Week 9 Oct. 18	Week 10 Oct. 25	Week 11 Nov. 1	Week 12 Nov. 8	Final Dec. 6	
		Dropped: USC; Arizona; Ohio State; South Carolina; Loyola Marymount	Dropped: Ole Miss	Dropped: Auburn; Santa Clara	Dropped: Northwestern; Arkansas	Dropped: Ohio State; Pepperdine	Dropped: Texas A&M; Virginia Tech; Texas Tech	Dropped: Northwestern	Dropped: Oklahoma; South Florida; Rutgers	Dropped: Michigan	Dropped: Baylor; Virginia Tech	Dropped: Penn State; Oklahoma	Dropped: Kansas	Dropped: Cal; Oklahoma	

== Soccer America ==
	Preseason Aug. 18	Week 1 Aug. 21	Week 2 Aug. 28	Week 3 Sept. 4	Week 4 Sept. 11	Week 5 Sept. 18	Week 6 Sept. 25	Week 7 Oct. 2	Week 8 Oct. 9	Week 9 Oct. 16	Week 10 Oct. 23	Week 11 Oct. 30	Final Nov. 6	
1.	Stanford	Stanford (2–0–0)	Stanford (3–0–0)	Stanford (5–0–0)	West Virginia (6–0–1)	Stanford (7–0–1)	Stanford (8–0–1)	Stanford (10–0–1)	West Virginia (12–1–1)	West Virginia (13–1–1)	West Virginia (15–1–1)	West Virginia (16–1–1)	West Virginia (19–1–1)	1.
2.	Duke	Duke (2–0–0)	Florida State (3–0–0)	West Virginia (5–0–1)	Stanford (6–0–1)	Florida State (7–1–0)	Florida State (8–1–1)	Florida State (9–1–1)	Georgetown (10–1–2)	Georgetown (12–1–2)	South Carolina (16–0–1)	South Carolina (17–0–1)	Stanford (17–1–1)	2.
3.	Florida State	Florida State (1–0–0)	West Virginia (3–0–1)	Virginia (6–0–0)	Florida (5–1–0)	Georgetown (8–1–0)	Georgetown (8–1–1)	Georgetown (9–1–1)	South Carolina (13–0–1)	South Carolina (14–0–1)	Stanford (14–1–1)	Stanford (16–1–1)	Florida (15–4–1)	3.
4.	West Virginia	West Virginia (1–0–1)	Virginia (4–0–0)	Florida (4–1–0)	Florida State (5–1–0)	Virginia (8–1–0)	West Virginia (8–1–)	West Virginia (10–1–1)	Stanford (11–1–1)	Stanford (12–1–1)	USC (13–3–0)	USC (14–3–1)	South Carolina (18–1–1)	4.
5.	Penn State	Penn State (1–0–1)	Florida (3–1–0)	North Carolina (4–0–1)	Virginia (7–1–0)	West Virginia (7–1–1)	BYU (9–1–0)	South Carolina (11–0–1)	USC (10–3–0)	USC (11–3–0)	Florida State (12–2–2)	Georgetown (14–2–2)	Georgetown (16–2–3)	5.
6.	Florida	Florida (2–0–0)	Clemson (3–1–0)	Duke (4–1–1)	North Carolina (5–1–1)	Duke (6–2–1)	South Carolina (10–0–1)	USC (9–2–0)	North Carolina (8–2–3)	Duke (11–2–2)	Duke (12–3–2)	BYU (15–2–1)	BYU (16–2–1)	6.
7.	Virginia	Virginia (1–0–1)	Rutgers (3–0–1)	UCLA (3–1–0)	Duke (5–2–1)	BYU (7–1–0)	USC (7–2–0)	UCLA (9–2–0)	Virginia (10–2–2)	Florida State (10–2–2)	Georgetown (13–2–2)	Notre Dame (13–2–4)	Florida State (13–3–4)	7.
8.	USC	Santa Clara (2–0–0)	North Carolina (3–0–0)	Florida State (3–1–0)	BYU (5–1–0)	South Carolina (8–0–1)	UCLA (7–2–0)	BYU (9–1–1)	Duke (10–2–2)	Cal (12–2–1)	BYU (13–2–1)	North Carolina (12–3–3)	North Carolina (13–3–4)	8.
9.	Texas A&M	Clemson (2–0–0)	Arkansas (3–0–0)	BYU (4–1–0)	Georgetown (6–1–0)	USC (6–2–0)	Arkansas (11–1–0)	Arkansas (12–1–0)	Florida State (9–2–2)	BYU (12–2–1)	Virginia (12–3–2)	Clemson (13–3–3)	USC (14–4–1)	9.
10.	Clemson	Connecticut (2–0–0)	Duke (3–1–0)	South Carolina (5–0–1)	South Carolina (5–0–1)	UCLA (6–2–0)	North Carolina (6–2–2)	North Carolina (6–2–3)	Cal (11–2–1)	Virginia (10–3–2)	Notre Dame (11–2–4)	Florida State (12–3–3)	Notre Dame (13–3–4)	10.
11.	Connecticut	North Carolina (2–0–0)	UCLA (2–1–0)	Cal (5–1–0)	USC (5–2–0)	Arkansas (9–1–0)	Virginia (8–2–1)	Virginia (8–2–2)	BYU (11–2–1)	Notre Dame (10–2–3)	North Carolina (10–3–3)	Duke (12–4–3)	Clemson (13–4–3)	11.
12.	North Carolina	Texas A&M (1–1–0)	BYU (2–1–0)	Penn State (2–2–1)	UCLA (4–2–0)	Florida (6–2–0)	Duke (7–2–2)	Duke (8–2–2)	Arkansas (13–2–0)	North Carolina (8–3–3)	UCLA (12–3–1)	Virginia (13–4–2)	Connecticut (18–2–1)	12.
13.	Rutgers	BYU (1–0–0)	Penn State (1–1–1)	Ohio State (5–1–0)	Penn State (4–2–1)	North Carolina (5–2–1)	Penn State (7–2–2)	Penn State (8–2–2)	UCLA (9–3–1)	UCLA (10–3–1)	Clemson (12–3–2)	Connecticut (16–2–1)	Minnesota (16–3–3)	13.
14.	Auburn	UCLA (1–0–0)	Auburn (3–1–0)	Connecticut (5–1–0)	Ohio State (6–1–0)	Texas A&M (7–2–0)	Clemson (8–2–1)	Notre Dame (8–1–3)	Penn State (9–2–3)	Penn State (10–2–4)	Connecticut (14–2–1)	Florida (13–4–0)	Duke (12–4–3)	14.
15.	Cal	Notre Dame (2–0–0)	Cal (3–1–0)	Texas A&M (4–2–0)	Texas A&M (5–2–0)	Penn State (5–2–2)	Notre Dame (7–1–3)	Clemson (8–2–2)	Notre Dame (9–2–3)	Clemson (10–3–2)	Florida (12–4–0)	Colorado (14–5–0)	Virginia (13–4–2)	15.
16.	BYU	Rutgers (1–0–1)	Virginia Tech (4–0–0)	Boston College (5–0–1)	Boston College (7–0–1)	Clemson (7–2–0)	Connecticut (8–2–0)	Connecticut (10–2–0)	Clemson (9–3–2)	Connecticut (13–2–1)	Colorado (13–4–0)	Auburn (13–5–0)	Colorado (14–5–1)	16.
17.	UCLA	USC (0–1–0)	Ohio State (4–0–0)	Virginia Tech (5–1–0)	Virginia Tech (7–1–0)	Boston College (8–1–1)	Michigan (7–1–1)	Michigan (9–1–1)	Connecticut (11–2–1)	Auburn (11–4–0)	Cal (12–3–2)	Arkansas (15–4–0)	Arkansas (17–5–0)	17.
18.	Wisconsin	Auburn (1–1–0)	Long Beach St (2–0–1)	Clemson (3–2–0)	Clemson (5–2–0)	Virginia Tech (8–2–0)	Louisville (7–2–2)	Auburn (7–4–0)	Auburn (10–4–0)	Arkansas (13–3–0)	Penn State (10–3–4)	Minnesota (14–3–3)	Auburn (14–6–0)	18.
19.	Notre Dame	Cal (1–1–0)	Connecticut (3–1–0)	George Washington (5–0–0)	Notre Dame (5–1–2)	Notre Dame (5–1–3)	Auburn (7–4–0)	Florida (9–3–0)	Florida (10–3–0)	Florida (10–3–0)	Auburn (12–5–0)	Utah (11–3–4)	Utah (11–3–5)	19.
20.	Virginia Tech	Virginia Tech (2–0–0)	Texas A&M (2–2–0)	Georgetown (4–1–0)	Connecticut (6–2–0)	Connecticut (7–2–0)	Florida (7–3–0)	Cal (10–2–0)	Minnesota (11–3–1)	Minnesota (12–3–2)	Arkansas (14–4–0)	Northwestern (14–1–4)	UCLA (13–5–1)	20.
21.	Texas Tech	Texas Tech (2–0–0)	Texas Tech (3–0–1)	Rutgers (3–1–1)	Rutgers (5–1–1)	Rutgers (6–1–1)	Rutgers (7–1–2)	Louisville (7–3–2)	Northwestern (12–1–1)	Northwestern (13–1–2)	Minnesota (12–3–3)	Rutgers (10–3–6)	Rutgers (11–4–6)	21.
22.	Ohio State	Ohio State (1–0–0)	South Carolina (3–0–1)	Arkansas (5–1–0)	Arkansas (7–1–0)	Minnesota (7–2–1)	Minnesota (9–2–1)	Rutgers (8–2–2)	Colorado (11–3–0)	Colorado (12–3–0)	Northwestern (13–1–3)	UCLA (12–5–1)	Northwestern (14–2–4)	22.
23.	South Carolina	Pepperdine (2–0–0)	Boston College (3–0–1)	Texas Tech (4–1–1)	Texas Tech (6–1–1)	NC State (7–2–0)	Cal (8–2–0)	Minnesota (9–3–1)	Rutgers (9–2–3)	Utah (10–2–2)	Pepperdine (11–3–3)	Cal (13–4–2)	Cal (13–5–2)	23.
24.	Arizona	South Carolina (1–0–1)	Minnesota (4–0–0)	Minnesota (5–1–0)	South Florida (7–0–0)	Cal (7–2–0)	South Florida (8–0–0)	NC State (9–3–0)	Virginia Tech (10–4–1)	Pepperdine (10–3–3)	Utah (10–3–3)	Penn State (11–4–4)	Penn State (11–4–4)	24.
25.	Boston College	Boston College (1–0–1)	Santa Clara (2–2–0)	South Florida (5–0–0)	Cal (6–2–0)	South Florida (7–0–0)	Boston College (9–2–1)	Oklahoma (10–3–1)	Boston College (10–4–1)	Virginia Tech (10–4–2)	Kansas (9–4–4); Oklahoma (12–4–2)	Kansas (10–4–4); Loyola Marymount (11–4–3)	Pepperdine (12–4–3)	25.
	Preseason Aug. 18	Week 1 Aug. 21	Week 2 Aug. 28	Week 3 Sept. 4	Week 4 Sept. 11	Week 5 Sept. 18	Week 6 Sept. 25	Week 7 Oct. 2	Week 8 Oct. 9	Week 9 Oct. 16	Week 10 Oct. 23	Week 11 Oct. 30	Final Nov. 6	
		Dropped: Wisconsin; Arizona	Dropped: Notre Dame; USC; Pepperdine	Dropped: Auburn; Long Beach State; Santa Clara	Dropped: George Washington; Minnesota	Dropped: Ohio State; Texas Tech	Dropped: Texas A&M; Virginia Tech; NC State	Dropped: South Florida; Boston College	Dropped: Michigan; Louisville; NC State; Oklahoma	Dropped: Rutgers; Boston College	Dropped: Virginia Tech	Dropped: Pepperdine; Oklahoma	Dropped: Kansas; Loyola Marymount	

== Top Drawer ==
	Preseason June 22	Week 1 Aug. 22	Week 2 Aug. 29	Week 3 Sept. 5	Week 4 Sept. 12	Week 5 Sept. 19	Week 6 Sept. 26	Week 7 Oct. 3	Week 8 Oct. 10	Week 9 Oct. 17	Week 10 Oct. 24	Week 11 Oct. 31	Week 12 Nov. 7	Week 13 Nov. 14	Week 14 Nov. 21	Final Dec. 5	
1.	Stanford	Stanford (2–0–0)	Stanford (3–0–0)	Stanford (5–0–0)	West Virginia (6–0–1)	Stanford (7–0–1)	Stanford (8–0–1)	Stanford (10–0–1)	West Virginia (12–1–1)	West Virginia (13–1–1)	West Virginia (15–1–1)	West Virginia (16–1–1)	West Virginia (19–1–1)	West Virginia (20–1–1)	West Virginia (21–1–2)	USC (19–4–2)	1.
2.	Florida State	Florida State (1–0–0)	Florida State (3–0–0)	Florida State (3–0–0)	Stanford (6–0–1)	Virginia (8–1–0)	BYU (9–1–0)	West Virginia (10–1–1)	South Carolina (13–0–1)	South Carolina (14–0–1)	South Carolina (16–0–1)	South Carolina (17–0–1)	Stanford (17–1–1)	Stanford (18–1–1)	Georgetown (19–2–3)	West Virginia (23–2–2)	2.
3.	Duke	Duke (2–0–0)	Virginia (4–0–0)	Virginia (6–0–0)	Florida (5–1–0)	Florida State (7–1–0)	West Virginia (8–1–1)	BYU (9–1–1)	Duke (10–2–2)	Duke (11–2–2)	USC (13–3–0)	Stanford (16–1–1)	BYU (16–2–1)	BYU (17–2–1)	USC (16–4–2)	Georgetown (20–3–3)	3.
4.	Penn State	Virginia (2–0–0)	West Virginia (3–0–1)	West Virginia (5–0–1)	Florida State (5–1–0)	West Virginia (7–1–1)	Florida State (8–1–1)	Florida State (9–1–1)	Virginia (10–2–2)	USC (11–3–0)	Stanford (14–1–1)	USC (14–3–1)	Florida (15–4–1)	Florida (16–4–1)	South Carolina (21–1–1)	North Carolina (17–4–4)	4.
5.	West Virginia	Penn State (1–0–1)	Duke (3–1–0)	Duke (4–1–1)	Virginia (7–1–0)	BYU (7–1–0)	USC (7–2–0)	USC (9–2–0)	USC (10–3–0)	Stanford (12–1–1)	BYU (13–2–1)	BYU (15–2–1)	Georgetown (16–2–3)	Georgetown (17–2–3)	Duke (15–4–3)	South Carolina (21–2–1)	5.
6.	Virginia	West Virginia (1–0–1)	Penn State (1–1–1)	Florida (4–1–0)	BYU (5–1–0)	USC (6–2–0)	Duke (7–2–2)	Duke (8–2–2)	Stanford (11–1–1)	BYU (12–2–1)	Duke (12–3–2)	Notre Dame (13–2–4)	South Carolina (18–1–1)	South Carolina (19–1–1)	Auburn (17–6–0)	Duke (15–5–3)	6.
7.	Florida	Florida (2–0–0)	North Carolina (3–0–0)	North Carolina (4–0–1)	Ohio State (6–1–0)	Duke (6–2–1)	UCLA (7–2–0)	UCLA (9–2–0)	BYU (11–2–1)	Cal (12–2–1)	Virginia (12–3–2)	Florida (13–4–0)	USC (14–4–1)	USC (15–4–1)	North Carolina (16–3–4)	Auburn (17–7–0)	7.
8.	USC	Connecticut (2–0–0)	Rutgers (3–0–1)	Connecticut (5–1–0)	Duke (5–2–1)	UCLA (6–2–0)	Virginia (8–2–1)	Virginia (8–2–2)	Cal (11–2–1)	Virginia (10–3–2)	UCLA (12–3–1)	Connecticut (16–2–1)	Connecticut (18–2–1)	Connecticut (19–2–1)	Santa Clara (12–6–4)	Santa Clara (12–7–4)	8.
9.	Connecticut	Clemson (2–0–0)	Clemson (3–1–0)	Ohio State (5–1–0)	North Carolina (5–1–1)	Florida (6–2–0)	Arkansas (11–1–0)	Arkansas (12–1–0)	UCLA (9–3–1)	UCLA (10–3–1)	Florida State (12–2–2)	North Carolina (12–3–3)	Florida State (13–3–4)	Florida State (14–3–4)	Stanford (18–2–1)	Stanford (18–2–1)	9.
10.	Clemson	North Carolina (2–0–0)	Florida (3–1–0)	Cal (5–1–0)	USC (5–2–0)	Georgetown (8–1–0)	South Carolina (10–0–1)	South Carolina (11–0–1)	Georgetown (10–1–2)	Georgetown (11–1–2)	Notre Dame (11–2–4)	Clemson (13–3–3)	Notre Dame (13–3–4)	North Carolina (14–3–4)	BYU (18–3–1)	BYU (18–3–1)	10.
11.	Rutgers	USC (0–1–0)	Connecticut (3–1–0)	UCLA (3–1–0)	Boston College (7–0–1)	Clemson (7–2–0)	Georgetown (8–1–1)	Georgetown (9–1–1)	Arkansas (13–2–0)	Florida State (10–2–2)	Florida (12–4–0)	Duke (12–4–3)	Minnesota (16–3–3)	Clemson (14–4–3)	Florida (17–5–1)	Florida (17–5–1)	11.
12.	North Carolina	Rutgers (1–0–1)	Virginia Tech (4–0–0)	Minnesota (5–1–0)	UCLA (4–2–0)	Minnesota (7–2–1)	Clemson (8–2–1)	Clemson (8–2–2)	Florida (10–3–0)	Notre Dame (10–2–3)	Clemson (12–3–2)	Florida State (12–3–3)	North Carolina (13–3–4)	UCLA (14–5–1)	Connecticut (19–3–1)	Connecticut (19–3–1)	12.
13.	Texas A&M	Texas A&M (1–1–0)	Minnesota (4–0–0)	Boston College (5–0–1)	Minnesota (6–2–0)	Arkansas (9–1–0)	North Carolina (6–2–2)	North Carolina (6–2–3)	Florida State (9–2–2)	Florida (10–4–0)	Connecticut (14–2–1)	Virginia (13–4–2)	Clemson (13–4–3)	Duke (13–4–3)	Clemson (14–5–4)	Clemson (14–5–4)	13.
14.	Auburn	BYU (1–0–0)	USC (1–2–0)	Clemson (3–2–0)	Connecticut (6–2–0)	North Carolina (5–2–1)	Minnesota (9–2–1)	Florida (8–3–0)	North Carolina (8–2–3)	Arkansas (13–3–0)	Georgetown (13–2–2)	Georgetown (14–2–2)	UCLA (13–5–1)	Virginia (14–4–2)	UCLA (15–5–2)	UCLA (15–5–2)	14.
15.	Cal	Santa Clara (2–0–0)	Auburn (3–1–0)	BYU (3–1–0)	Clemson (5–2–0)	Connecticut (7–2–0)	Florida (7–3–0)	Connecticut (10–2–0)	Clemson (9–3–2)	Clemson (10–3–2)	Cal (12–3–2)	Minnesota (14–3–3)	Duke (12–4–3)	Arkansas (18–5–0)	Virginia (15–5–2)	Virginia (15–5–2)	15.
16.	Wisconsin	Auburn (1–1–0)	BYU (2–1–0)	USC (2–2–0)	Virginia Tech (7–1–0)	Texas A&M (7–2–0)	Connecticut (8–2–0)	Michigan (9–1–1)	Connecticut (11–2–1)	Connecticut (13–2–1)	North Carolina (10–3–3)	UCLA (12–5–1)	Virginia (13–4–2)	Pepperdine (12–4–4)	Arkansas (18–5–1)	Arkansas (18–5–1)	16.
17.	BYU	Minnesota (2–0–0)	Cal (3–1–0)	Virginia Tech (5–1–0)	Texas A&M (5–2–0)	Boston College (8–1–1)	Rutgers (7–1–2)	Penn State (8–2–2)	Penn State (9–2–3)	Penn State (10–2–4)	Minnesota (12–3–3)	Northwestern (14–1–4)	Arkansas (17–5–0)	Rutgers (12–4–6)	Pepperdine (12–5–4)	Pepperdine (12–5–4)	17.
18.	Arizona	Virginia Tech (2–0–0)	Texas A&M (2–2–0)	Texas A&M (4–2–0)	Penn State (4–2–1)	Rutgers (6–1–1)	South Florida (8–0–0)	Cal (10–2–0)	Minnesota (11–3–1)	North Carolina (8–3–3)	Northwestern (13–1–3)	Auburn (13–5–0)	Pepperdine (12–4–3)	Auburn (15–6–0)	Rutgers (12–5–6)	Rutgers (12–5–6)	18.
19.	Minnesota	Cal (1–1–0)	Ohio State (4–0–0)	Penn State (2–2–1)	Rutgers (5–1–1)	South Florida (7–0–0)	Penn State (7–2–2)	Notre Dame (8–1–3)	Notre Dame (9–2–3)	Minnesota (12–3–2)	Pepperdine (11–3–3)	Arkansas (15–4–0)	Rutgers (11–4–6)	Kansas (11–5–4)	Florida State (14–4–4)	Florida State (14–4–4)	19.
20.	Virginia Tech	Wisconsin (1–1–0)	Santa Clara (2–2–0)	Rutgers (3–1–1)	South Florida (7–0–0)	Penn State (5–2–2)	Cal (8–2–0)	Minnesota (9–3–1)	Northwestern (12–1–1)	Northwestern (13–1–2)	Arkansas (14–4–0)	Pepperdine (11–4–3)	Auburn (14–6–0)	Minnesota (16–3–4)	Kansas (11–6–4)	Kansas (11–6–4)	20.
21.	Ohio State	Ohio State (1–0–0)	UCLA (2–1–0)	South Florida (5–0–0)	Cal (6–2–0)	Cal (7–2–0)	Notre Dame (7–1–3)	South Florida (9–1–0)	Michigan (9–3–1)	Michigan (9–3–3)	Penn State (10–3–4)	Kansas (10–4–4)	Kansas (10–5–4)	Notre Dame (13–3–5)	Minnesota (16–3–4)	Minnesota (16–3–4)	21.
22.	Santa Clara	Ole Miss (2–0–0)	Boston College (3–0–1)	South Carolina (4–0–1)	South Carolina (6–0–1)	South Carolina (8–0–1)	Michigan (7–1–0)	Rutgers (8–2–2)	Utah (9–2–2)	Utah (10–2–2)	Kansas (9–4–4)	Utah (11–3–4)	Utah (11–3–5)	Utah (12–3–5)	Notre Dame (13–3–5)	Notre Dame (13–3–5)	22.
23.	Ole Miss	Boston College (1–0–1)	Long Beach St (3–0–1)	Arizona (2–1–1)	Arizona (5–1–1)	Ohio State (6–3–1)	Oklahoma (9–2–1)	Princeton (8–1–1)	Pepperdine (8–3–3)	Pepperdine (9–3–3)	Utah (10–3–3)	Cal (13–4–2)	Northwestern (14–2–4)	Northwestern (15–2–4)	Utah (13–4–5)	NC State (11–9–2)	23.
24.	FGCU	Pepperdine (2–0–0)	South Florida (4–0–0)	Georgetown (4–1–0)	Georgetown (6–1–0)	Virginia Tech (8–2–0)	Boston College (9–2–1)	Oklahoma (10–3–1)	South Florida (9–1–1)	Auburn (11–4–0)	Oklahoma (12–4–2)	Rutgers (10–3–6)	Harvard (10–3–3)	Colorado (15–5–1)	Northwestern (16–3–4)	Northwestern (16–3–4)	24.
25.	Boston College	Arizona (0–1–0)	Arizona (1–1–1)	Notre Dame (5–1–0)	Notre Dame (5–1–2)	Northwestern (9–0–0)	Northwestern (10–1–0)	Northwestern (10–1–1)	Rutgers (9–2–3)	Colorado (12–3–0)	Colorado (13–4–0)	Penn State (11–4–4)	Penn State (11–4–4)	Penn State (12–4–4)	Colorado (15–6–1)	Colorado (15–6–1)	25.
	Preseason June 22	Week 1 Aug. 22	Week 2 Aug. 29	Week 3 Sept. 5	Week 4 Sept. 12	Week 5 Sept. 19	Week 6 Sept. 26	Week 7 Oct. 3	Week 8 Oct. 10	Week 9 Oct. 17	Week 10 Oct. 24	Week 11 Oct. 31	Week 12 Nov. 7	Week 13 Nov. 14	Week 14 Nov. 21	Final Dec. 5	
		Dropped: FGCU	Dropped: Wisconsin; Ole Miss; Pepperdine	Dropped: Auburn; Santa Clara; Long Beach State	None	Dropped: Arizona; Notre Dame	Dropped: Texas A&M; Ohio State; Virginia Tech	Dropped: Boston College	Dropped: Princeton; Oklahoma	Dropped: South Florida; Rutgers	Dropped: Michigan; Auburn	Dropped: Oklahoma; Colorado	Dropped: Cal	Dropped: Harvard	Dropped: Penn State	Dropped: Utah	

== Hero Sports ==
	Preseason Aug. 13	Week 1 Aug. 22	Week 2 Aug. 29	Week 3 Sept. 5	Week 4 Sept. 12	Week 5 Sept. 19	Week 6 Sept. 26	Week 7 Oct. 3	Week 8 Oct. 10	Week 9 Oct. 17	Week 10 Oct. 24	Week 11	Week Postseason	Final	
1.	Penn State	Penn State (1–0–1)	Penn State (1–1–1)	Florida (4–1–0)	Virginia (7–1–0)	Virginia (8–1–0)	USC (7–2–0)	USC (9–2–0)	USC (10–3–0)	USC (11–3–0)	USC (13–3–0)				1.
2.	Stanford	Florida State (1–0–0)	Florida State (3–0–0)	Virginia (6–0–0)	Stanford (6–0–1)	BYU (7–1–0)	BYU (9–1–0)	Stanford (10–0–1)	Stanford (11–1–1)	BYU (12–2–1)	Stanford (14–1–1)				2.
3.	Florida State	Stanford (2–0–0)	Stanford (3–0–0)	Stanford (5–0–0)	Florida (5–1–0)	Stanford (7–0–1)	Stanford (8–0–1)	BYU (9–1–1)	BYU (11–2–1)	Stanford (12–1–1)	BYU (13–2–1)				3.
4.	Duke	Duke (2–0–0)	Duke (3–1–0)	Cal (5–1–0)	South Carolina (6–0–1	South Carolina (8–0–1)	South Carolina (10–0–1)	South Carolina (11–0–1)	South Carolina (13–0–1)	South Carolina (14–0–1)	South Carolina (16–0–1)				4.
5.	West Virginia	Clemson (2–0–0)	Clemson (3–1–0)	USC (3–2–0)	USC (5–2–0)	USC (6–2–0)	Virginia (8–2–1)	Virginia (8–2–2)	Virginia (10–2–2)	Virginia (10–3–2)	Virginia (12–3–2)				5.
6.	USC	Florida (2–0–0)	Florida (3–1–0)	Florida State (3–1–0)	BYU (5–1–0)	Florida (6–2–0)	UCLA (7–2–0)	UCLA (9–2–0)	West Virginia (12–1–1)	West Virginia (13–1–1)	West Virginia (15–1–1)				6.
7.	Virginia	Virginia (2–0–0)	Virginia (4–0–0)	West Virginia (5–0–1)	Georgetown (6–1–0)	UCLA (6–2–0)	Clemson (8–2–1)	West Virginia (10–1–1)	UCLA (9–3–1)	UCLA (10–3–1)	Florida (12–4–0)				7.
8.	Florida	West Virginia (1–0–1)	West Virginia (3–0–1)	Penn State (2–2–1)	Clemson (5–2–0)	Georgetown (8–1–0)	Georgetown (8–1–1)	Clemson (8–2–2)	Minnesota (11–3–1)	Cal (12–2–1)	UCLA (12–3–1)				8.
9.	Clemson	Virginia Tech (2–0–0)	Virginia Tech (4–0–0)	BYU (3–1–0)	UCLA (4–2–0)	Clemson (7–2–0)	Minnesota (9–2–1)	Georgetown (9–1–1)	Florida (10–3–0)	Duke (11–2–2)	Clemson (12–3–2)				9.
10.	Virginia Tech	BYU (1–0–0)	BYU (2–1–0)	South Carolina (5–0–1)	Oklahoma (5–2–1)	Oklahoma (7–2–1)	Penn State (7–2–2)	Duke (8–2–2)	Duke (10–2–2)	Florida (10–4–0)	Minnesota (12–3–3)				10.
11.	Texas A&M	USC (0–1–0)	USC (1–2–0)	Clemson (3–2–0)	West Virginia (6–0–1)	West Virginia (7–1–1)	West Virginia (10–1–1)	Florida (8–3–0)	Cal (11–2–1)	Georgetown (12–1–2)	Cal (12–2–2)				11.
12.	North Carolina	North Carolina (2–0–0)	North Carolina (3–0–0)	Virginia Tech (5–1–0)	Long Beach State (4–2–1)	Minnesota (7–2–1)	Florida (7–3–0)	North Carolina (6–2–3)	Clemson (9–3–2)	Minnesota (12–3–2)	Duke (12–3–2)				12.
13.	BYU	Santa Clara (2–0–0)	Santa Clara (2–2–0)	Duke (4–1–1)	Minnesota (6–2–0)	Penn State (5–2–2)	Oklahoma (9–2–1)	Penn State (8–2–2)	Georgetown (10–1–2)	Clemson (10–3–2)	Georgetown (13–2–2)				13.
14.	Cal	South Carolina (1–0–1)	South Carolina (3–0–1)	North Carolina (4–0–1)	Penn State (4–2–1)	Michigan (6–1–1)	North Carolina (6–2–2)	Cal (10–2–0)	North Carolina (8–2–3)	North Carolina (8–3–3)	North Carolina (10–3–3)				14.
15.	South Carolina	Minnesota (2–0–0)	Minnesota (4–0–0)	Minnesota (5–1–0)	Utah (4–2–0)	Long Beach State (4–4–1)	Duke (7–2–2)	Minnesota (9–3–1)	Penn State (9–2–3)	Notre Dame (10–3–2)	Notre Dame (11–2–4)				15.
16.	Texas Tech	Texas A&M (1–1–0)	Texas A&M (2–2–0)	Texas A&M (4–2–0)	Texas A&M (5–2–0)	Utah (5–2–1)	Utah (6–2–1)	Notre Dame (8–1–3)	Notre Dame (9–2–3)	Auburn (11–4–0)	Oklahoma (12–4–2)				16.
17.	Santa Clara	Cal (1–1–0)	Cal (3–1–0)	Ohio State (5–1–0)	Notre Dame (5–1–2)	NC State (7–2–0)	Cal (8–2–0)	Oklahoma (10–3–1)	Auburn (10–4–0)	Penn State (10–2–4)	Pepperdine (11–3–3)				17.
18.	Minnesota	Notre Dame (2–0–0)	Notre Dame (3–1–0)	Notre Dame (5–1–0)	Loyola Marymount (4–2–1)	Duke (6–2–1)	Long Beach State (4–5–1)	Utah (7–2–2)	Pepperdine (8–3–3)	Oklahoma (11–4–1)	Auburn (12–5–0)				18.
19.	Connecticut	Oklahoma (1–0–1)	Oklahoma (2–1–1)	UCLA (3–1–0)	Pepperdine (4–2–1)	North Carolina (5–2–1)	Notre Dame (7–1–3)	Michigan (9–1–1)	Oklahoma (10–4–1)	Pepperdine (9–3–3)	Utah (11–3–3)				19.
20.	Notre Dame	Connecticut (2-0-0)	Connecticut (3–1–0)	Northwestern (5–0–0)	Missouri (5–2–0)	Cal (7–2–0)	Michigan (7–1–1)	Long Beach State (5–5–2)	Utah (9–2–2)	Utah (11–2–2)	Florida State (12–2–2)				20.
21.	Arizona	Texas Tech (2–0–0)	Texas Tech (4–1–1)	Washington (3–1–0)	Michigan (4–1–1)	Texas A&M (7–2–0)	Auburn (7–4–0)	NC State (9–2–0)	Colorado (11–3–0)	Colorado (12–3–0)	Colorado (12–4–0)				21.
22.	Auburn	Ohio State (1–0–0)	Ohio State (4–0–0)	Michigan (3–1–1)	Ohio State (6–1–0)	Wake Forest (8–1–0)	Florida State (8–1–1)	Auburn (8–4–0)	Loyola Marymount (8–3–3)	Loyola Marymount (10–3–3)	Penn State (10–3–4)				22.
23.	Washington State	Northwestern (2–0–0)	Northwestern (3–0–0)	Santa Clara (2–2–2)	NC State (6–2–0)	Washington State (5–2–1)	Santa Clara (3–4–3)	Florida State (9–1–1)	Santa Clara (5–5–4)	Santa Clara (6–6–4)	Santa Clara (6–6–4)				23.
24.	Ohio State	Auburn (1–1–0)	Auburn (3–1–0)	Arizona (2–1–1)	North Carolina (5–1–1)	Notre Dame (5–1–3)	Nebraska (8–3–0)	Santa Clara (3–4–4)	Arkansas (13–2–0)	Arkansas (13–3–0)	Long Beach State (7–6–3)				24.
25.	Rutgers	William & Mary (1–0–0)	William & Mary (2–1–0)	Boston College (5–0–1)	Washington State (3–2–1)	Santa Clara (2–4–3)	NC State (8–2–0)	Loyola Marymount (7–2–3)	Long Beach State (6–6–2)	Florida State (10–2–2)	Nebraska (10–5–3)				25.
	Preseason Aug. 13	Week 1 Aug. 22	Week 2 Aug. 29	Week 3 Sept. 5	Week 4 Sept. 12	Week 5 Sept. 19	Week 6 Sept. 26	Week 7 Oct. 3	Week 8 Oct. 10	Week 9 Oct. 17	Week 10 Oct. 24	Week 11	Week Postseason	Final	
		Dropped: Arizona; Washington State; Rutgers	None	Dropped: Oklahoma; Connecticut; Texas Tech; Auburn; William & Mary	Dropped: Cal; Florida State; Virginia Tech; Duke; Northwestern; Washington; Santa Clara; Arizona; Boston College	Dropped: Loyola Marymount; Pepperdine; Missouri; Ohio State	Dropped: Texas A&M; Wake Forest; Washington State	Dropped: Nebraska	Dropped: Michigan; NC State; Florida State	Dropped: Long Beach State	Dropped: Loyola Marymount; Arkansas	None	None	None	
