= Bri Folds =

American soccer player

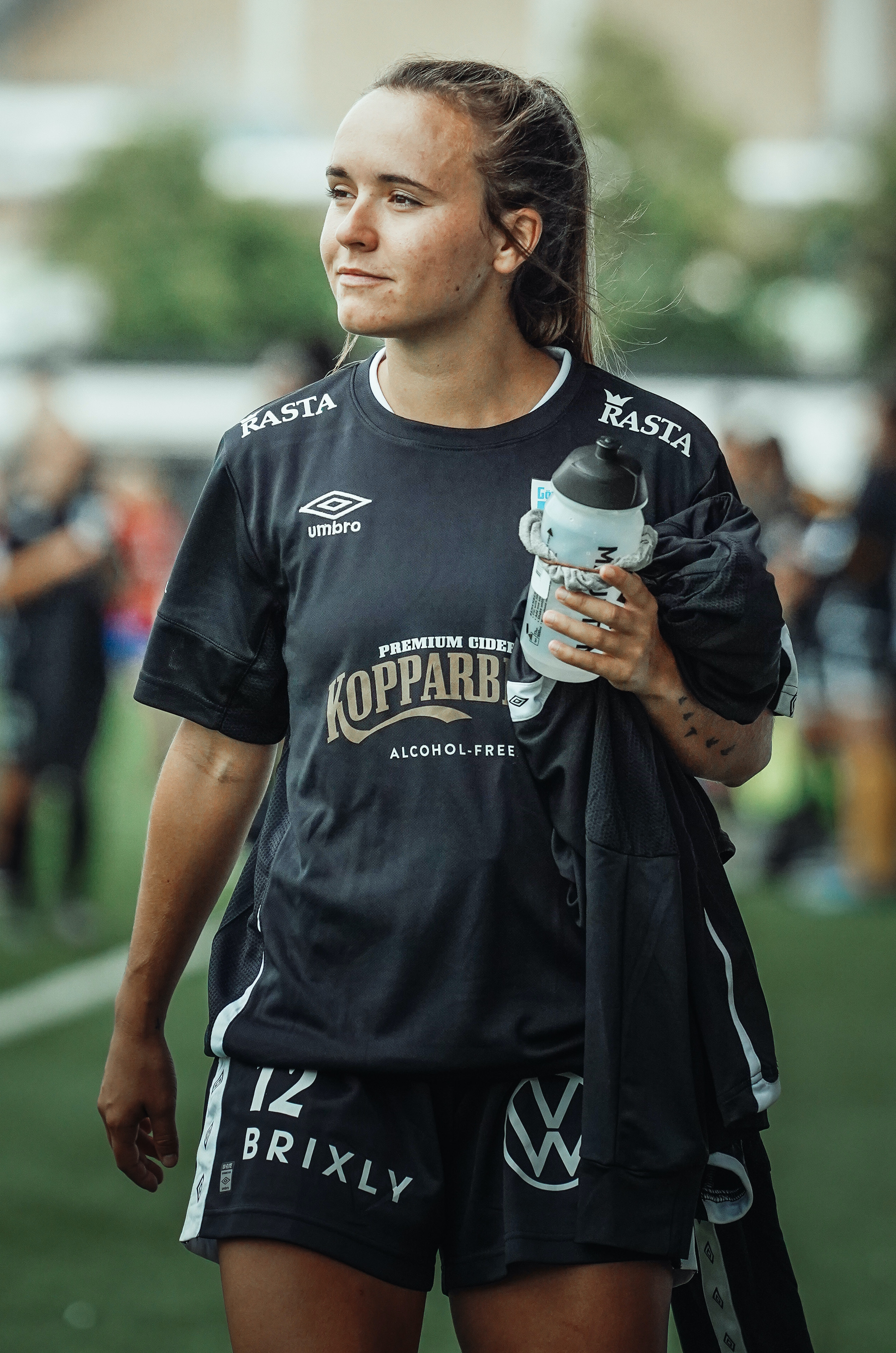
- Bri Folds, June 2020

Personal information
- Full name: Brianne Michelle Folds
- Date of birth: January 25, 1998 (age 28)
- Place of birth: Lakeland, Florida, United States
- Height: 5 ft 3 in (1.60 m)
- Position: Midfielder

Youth career
- Lakeland FC
- Tampa Bay Chargers

College career
Years	Team	Apps	(Gls)
2016–2019	Auburn Tigers	79	(24)

Senior career*
Years	Team	Apps	(Gls)
2020	Kopparbergs/Göteborg FC	6	(0)
2021	→ Fortuna Hjørring (loan)	9	(0)
2021–2022	Real Betis	14	(0)
2022	North Carolina Courage	0	(0)

International career^{‡}
2019	United States U23	3	(0)
- * Club domestic league appearances and goals as of April 18, 2023 ‡ National team caps and goals as of June 20, 2020

Brianne Michelle Folds (born January 25, 1998) is an American professional soccer player who last played as a midfielder for Spanish club Real Betis.

== Youth and college ==
At youth level, Folds scored 173 goals with 155 assists in 4 years at Lakeland Christian High School, while she also won the US Youth National Championship with Tampa Bay Chargers.

Folds signed for Auburn University, where she scored 24 goals and registered 25 assists in 79 matches. During her time at Auburn, Folds represented the United States at U23 level, most recently in April 2019.

== Club career ==
After graduating college in December 2019, Folds was drafted by North Carolina Courage in the 2020 NWSL College Draft. She was selected 36th overall, in the fourth round.

In June 2020, Folds signed an 18-month contract with Swedish runners-up Kopparbergs/Göteborg FC after training with the team.

In August 2021, Folds joined Spanish club Real Betis.

In July 2022, the North Carolina Courage signed Folds as a national team replacement player.
