= 2016 NCAA Division I women's soccer tournament =

2016 NCAA women's soccer tournament
Women's College Cup (Semifinals & Final)

Tournament details
- Country: United States
- Dates: November 11–December 4, 2016
- Teams: 64

Final positions
- Champions: USC (2nd title)
- Runners-up: West Virginia
- Semifinalists: Georgetown; North Carolina

Tournament statistics
- Matches played: 63
- Goals scored: 151 (2.4 per match)
- Top goal scorer(s): Brooke Ramsier, Auburn
- All statistics correct as of 11/2/2016.

The 2016 NCAA Division I women's soccer tournament (also known as the 2016 Women's College Cup) was the 35th annual single-elimination tournament to determine the national champion of NCAA Division I women's collegiate soccer. The semi-finals and championship game were played at Avaya Stadium in San Jose, California from December 2–4, 2016 while the preceding rounds were played at various sites across the country during November 2016.

== Qualification ==
All Division I women's soccer programs were eligible to qualify for the tournament. The tournament field remains fixed at 64 teams. 28 teams received automatic bids by winning their conference tournaments, 3 teams received automatic bids by claiming the conference regular season crown (Ivy League, Pac-12 Conference, and West Coast Conference don't hold conference tournaments) and an additional 33 teams earned at-large bids based on their regular season records.

=== Teams ===
Stanford Regional
Seed	School	Conference	Berth Type	Record
	Bucknell	Patriot	Automatic	16–1–2
	California	Pac-12	At-large	13–5–2
2	Georgetown	Big East	Automatic	16–2–3
	Harvard	Ivy	Automatic	10–3–3
	Houston Baptist	Southland	Automatic	10–10–1
	Long Beach State	Big West	Automatic	10–6–4
4	Minnesota	Big Ten	Automatic	16–3–3
	Monmouth	MAAC	Automatic	14–4–2
	NC State	ACC	At-large	10–8–1
	Penn State	Big Ten	At-large	11–4–4
	Pepperdine	West Coast	At-large	12–4–3
	Rutgers	Big Ten	At-large	11–4–6
	Saint Francis (PA)	NEC	Automatic	10–11
	Santa Clara	West Coast	At-large	09–6–4
1	Stanford	Pac-12	Automatic	17–1–1
3	Virginia	ACC	At-large	13–4–2

South Carolina Regional
Seed	School	Conference	Berth Type	Record
	Alabama State	SWAC	Automatic	11–9–1
	Arkansas	SEC	At-large	17–5
4	BYU	West Coast	Automatic	16–2–1
3	Clemson	ACC	At-large	13–4–3
	Colorado	Pac-12	At-large	14–5–1
	Kansas	Big 12	At-large	10–5–4
	Liberty	Big South	Automatic	14–7
	Memphis	AAC	At-large	14–4–1
	Missouri	SEC	At-large	11–6–2
2	North Carolina	ACC	At-large	13–3–4
	Northeastern	CAA	Automatic	14–6–1
	Oklahoma	Big 12	At-large	13–6–2
	Oklahoma State	Big 12	At-large	09–8–3
	SMU	AAC	At-large	13–6–2
1	South Carolina	SEC	At-large	18–1–1
	UNLV	Mountain West	Automatic	16–3–3

Florida Regional
Seed	School	Conference	Berth Type	Record
	Albany	America East	Automatic	11–7–1
4	Auburn	SEC	At-large	14–6
	Connecticut	AAC	Automatic	18–2–1
	Eastern Washington	Big Sky	Automatic	13–4–4
1	Florida	SEC	Automatic	15–4–1
	Florida Gulf Coast	Atlantic Sun	Automatic	14–4–1
3	Florida State	ACC	Automatic	13–3–4
	Marquette	Big East	At-large	12–7–2
	Samford	SoCon	Automatic	15–3–2
	South Alabama	Sun Belt	Automatic	15–5–1
	TCU	Big 12	At-large	12–6–2
	Texas A&M	SEC	At-large	11–8–1
	Texas Tech	Big 12	At-large	09–8–2
2	USC	Pac-12	At-large	14–4–1
	Utah	Pac-12	At-large	11–3–5
	Wisconsin	Big Ten	At-large	08–4–8

West Virginia Regional
Seed	School	Conference	Berth Type	Record
	Charlotte	C-USA	Automatic	11–8–2
	Dayton	Atlantic 10	Automatic	09–9–3
3	Duke	ACC	At-large	12–4–3
	Illinois State	MVC	Automatic	14–5–2
	Kent State	MAC	Automatic	15–2–2
	Michigan	Big Ten	At-large	10–5–4
	Nebraska	Big Ten	At-large	11–5–4
	Northern Kentucky	Horizon	Automatic	13–6–1
	Northwestern	Big Ten	At-large	14–2–4
2	Notre Dame	ACC	At-large	13–3–4
	Ohio State	Big Ten	At-large	10–6–3
	Seattle	WAC	Automatic	14–5–1
	SIU Edwardsville	OVC	Automatic	10–7–4
	South Dakota State	Summit	Automatic	10–7–3
4	UCLA	Pac-12	At-large	13–5–1
1	West Virginia	Big 12	Automatic	19–1–1

== Stanford bracket ==
First round November 11, 12 or 13; Campus Sites
1	Stanford*	4
Houston Baptist	0
Long Beach State	0
Santa Clara*	3
Pepperdine*	1 (3)
California	1 (2)
NC State	0 (4)
4	Minnesota*	0 (2)
3	Virginia*	4
Monmouth	1
Bucknell	0
Penn State*	6
Rutgers*	3
Harvard	0
St. Francis (PA)	0
2	Georgetown*	2

Second round November 18; Regional Campus Sites
1	Stanford*	0
Santa Clara	1^{2OT}
Pepperdine	0
NC State	1
3	Virginia	3
Penn State	0
Rutgers	0
2	Georgetown*	2

Round of 16; November 20; Regional Campus Sites
Santa Clara	3
NC State	0
3	Virginia	0
2	Georgetown*	2

Quarterfinals; November 25 or 26; Campus Sites
Santa Clara	0
2	Georgetown*	1

== Schedule ==
=== First round ===
November 11, 2016	Penn State	6–0	Bucknell	University Park, Pennsylvania
6:00 p.m. EST	Nickolette Driesse 15'; Charlotte Williams 41', 70'; Haleigh Echard 46'; Marissa Sheva 58'; Megan Schafer 81'	Report		Stadium: Jeffrey Field; Attendance: 573; Referee: Lucas Feathers; Assistant referees: Tim Deljanovan; Paul Deverse; Fourth official: John Woodruff

November 11, 2016	#3 Virginia	4–1	Monmouth	Charlottesville, Virginia
7:00 p.m. EST	Kristen McNabb 25'; Alexis Shaffer 26' (pen.), 57'; Morgan Reuther 85'	Report	Rachael Ivanicki 72'	Stadium: Klockner Stadium; Attendance: 745; Referee: Carmen Serbio; Assistant referees: Chris Scheve; Justin Howard; Fourth official: James Brooks

November 11, 2016	#1 Stanford	4–0	Houston Baptist	Stanford, California
10:00 p.m. EST	Kyra Carusa 6'; Sam Tran 17'; Michelle Xiao 25'; Logan Karam 83'	Report		Stadium: Laird Q. Cagan Stadium; Attendance: 1,022; Referee: Frank Anderson; Assistant referees: Deleana Quan; Daniel Cervantes; Fourth official: Matthew Buckman

November 12, 2016	Pepperdine	1–1 (a.e.t.) (3–2 p)	California	Malibu, California
4:00 p.m. EST	Danielle Thomas 6'	Report	Arielle Ship 68'	Stadium: Rokus Field; Attendance: 522; Referee: Alex Chilowicz; Assistant referees: Michelle Provan; Trevor Rappleye; Fourth official: Joe Pickens
	Penalties
	Bri Visalli (penalty scored); Rachael Collins (penalty scored); Katy Byrne (penalty missed); Kristen Rodriguez (penalty missed); Rylee Baisden (penalty scored)		(penalty scored) Kelly Fitzgerald; (penalty missed) Arielle Ship; (penalty scored) Ifeoma Onumonu; (penalty missed) Kayla Fong; (penalty missed) Mia Corbin

November 12, 2016	Santa Clara	3–0	Long Beach State	Santa Clara, California
4:00 p.m. EST	Jordan Jesolva 12'; Maddie Gonzalez 64', 83'	Report		Stadium: Stevens Stadium; Attendance: 415; Referee: Ian Anderson; Assistant referees: Deleana Quan; Joseph Dickerson; Fourth official: Turan Ozdemir

November 12, 2016	Rutgers	3–0	Harvard	Piscataway, New Jersey
5:00 p.m. EST	Madison Tiernan 26', 40'; Taylor Aylmer 84'	Report		Stadium: Yurcak Field; Attendance: 1,089; Referee: John McCloskey; Assistant referees: Michael Donovan; Gerald Blase; Fourth official: Nick Zegestowsky

November 12, 2016	#4 Minnesota	0–0 (a.e.t.) (2–4 p)	NC State	St. Paul, Minnesota
8:00 p.m. EST		Report		Stadium: Elizabeth Lyle Robbie Stadium; Attendance: 1,165; Referee: Kyle Burkhardt; Assistant referees: John Krill; Artem Sher; Fourth official: Cliff Anderson
	Penalties
	Julianna Gernes (penalty scored); Josee Stiever (penalty missed); Maya Rajacich (penalty scored); Molly Fiedler (penalty missed)		(penalty scored) Taylor Porter; (penalty scored) Tziarra King; (penalty scored) Hannah Keogh; (penalty scored) Ricarda Walkling

November 13, 2016	#2 Georgetown	2–0	St. Francis (PA)	Washington, D.C.
12:00 p.m. EST	Grace Damaska 30'; Marina Paul 52'	Report		Stadium: Shaw Field; Attendance: 551; Referee: Danielle Brzeninski; Assistant referees: Yanci De La O Brenda Magoba; Fourth official: Danielle Chesky

=== Second round ===
November 18, 2016	#3 Virginia	3–0	Penn State	Washington, D.C.
11:00 a.m. EST	Meghan Cox 1'; Betsy Brandon 23'; Taylor Ziemer 75'	Report		Stadium: Shaw Field; Referee: John Brady; Assistant referees: Dan Richman; Jason Gordon; Fourth official: Thomas Goubeaux

November 18, 2016	#2 Georgetown	2–0	Rutgers	Washington, D.C.
1:30 p.m. EST	Amanda Carolan 19'; Marina Paul 82'	Report		Stadium: Shaw Field; Referee: Mark Gorak; Assistant referees: John Barr; Gerald Blase; Fourth official: Benjamin Starr

November 18, 2016	Pepperdine	0–1	NC State	Stanford, California
7:30 p.m. EST		Report	Taylor Porter 65'	Stadium: Laird Q. Cagan Stadium; Attendance: 2,050; Referee: Joseph Dickerson; Assistant referees: Sarah Cortez; Chris Elliott; Fourth official: Yader Reyes

November 18, 2016	#1 Stanford	0–1 (a.e.t.)	Santa Clara	Stanford, California
10:00 p.m. EST		Report	Jenna Holtz 108'	Stadium: Laird Q. Cagan Stadium; Attendance: 2,050; Referee: Alex Chilowicz; Assistant referees: Andrew Hanks; Turan Ozdemir; Fourth official: Brian Yip

=== Round of 16 ===
November 20, 2016	#2 Georgetown	2–0	#3 Virginia	Washington, D.C.
12:00 p.m. EST	Unknown 47' (o.g.); Rachel Corboz 77'	Report		Stadium: Shaw Field; Referee: John McCloskey; Assistant referees: John Brady; Rebekah Friedrich; Fourth official: Tim Deljanovan

November 20, 2016	Santa Clara	3–0	NC State	Stanford, California
4:00 p.m. EST	Jordan Jesolva 21' (pen.); Julie Vass 80'; Brittany Ambrose 84'	Report		Stadium: Laird Q. Cagan Stadium; Attendance: 805; Referee: Matthew Buckman; Assistant referees: Matthew Schmitz; Salma Perez; Fourth official: Turan Ozdemir

=== Quarterfinals ===
November 26, 2016	#2 Georgetown	1–0	Santa Clara	Washington, D.C.
12:00 p.m. EST	Crystal Thomas 76'	Report		Stadium: Shaw Field; Attendance: 832; Referee: John Brady; Assistant referees: Eric Weisbrod; Tim Shaw; Fourth official: Shaun Papperman

== Florida bracket ==
First round November 11, 12 or 13; Campus Sites
1	Florida*	3
FGCU	0
Marquette	0
Wisconsin*	1
Connecticut*	4
Albany	2
South Alabama	0
4	Auburn*	4
3	Florida State*	4
Samford	0
Texas Tech	0
Utah*	1^{OT}
TCU*	0
Texas A&M	1
Eastern Washington	1
2	USC*	3

Second round November 18; Regional Campus Sites
1	Florida*	3^{2OT}
Wisconsin	2
Connecticut	1
4	Auburn	4
3	Florida State	1
Utah	2
Texas A&M	0 (3)
2	USC*	0 (4)

Round of 16; November 20; Regional Campus Sites
1	Florida*	1
4	Auburn	3
Utah	0
2	USC*	1

Quarterfinals; November 25 or 26; Campus Sites
4	Auburn	0
2	USC*	1

=== Schedule ===
==== First round ====
November 11, 2016	#1 Florida	3–0	FGCU	Gainesville, Florida
7:00 p.m. EST	Meggie Dougherty Howard 66'; Julia Lester 78'; Savannah Jordan 82'	Report		Stadium: Donald R. Dizney Stadium; Attendance: 1,132; Referee: Esteban Rosano; Assistant referees: Chris Beaulac; Adalberto Grimaldi; Fourth official: Jasmine Peralta

November 11, 2016	Wisconsin	1–0	Marquette	Madison, Wisconsin
7:00 p.m. EST	Rose Lavelle 30'	Report		Stadium: McClimon Complex; Attendance: 1,076; Referee: Landis Wiley; Assistant referees: Jordan Pramuk; Tyler Turner; Fourth official: James Friel

November 12, 2016	#4 Auburn	4–0	South Alabama	Auburn, Alabama
1:00 p.m. EST	Casie Ramsier 44'; Haley Gerken 53'; Brooke Ramsier 62', 78'	Report		Stadium: Auburn Soccer Complex; Attendance: 418; Referee: Aleksandar Zhelyazko; Assistant referees: Sam Bilbo; James Sherer; Fourth official: Amin Hadzic

November 12, 2016	#3 Florida State	4–0	Samford	Tallahassee, Florida
2:00 p.m. EST	Malia Berkely 3'; Megan Connolly 28'; Deyna Castellanos 55'; Heidi Kollanen 85'	Report		Stadium: Seminole Soccer Complex; Attendance: 1,377; Referee: Lance Vanhaitsma; Assistant referees: Trent Vanhaitsma; Juan Kalb; Fourth official: Alex Sorondo

November 12, 2016	Utah	1–0 (a.e.t.)	Texas Tech	Salt Lake City, Utah
3:00 p.m. EST	Katie Rogers 97'	Report		Stadium: Ute Soccer Field; Attendance: 1,179; Referee: Josh Wilkins; Assistant referees: Jay Hutchinson; Brandon Major; Fourth official: Hamed Sadeghi

November 12, 2016	#2 USC	3–1	Eastern Washington	Los Angeles, California
4:00 p.m. EST	Morgan Andrews 29', 33'; Nicole Molen 44'	Report	Devan Talley 59'	Stadium: McAlister Field; Attendance: 343; Referee: Ceciah Valero; Assistant referees: Salma Perez; Eduardo Jeff; Fourth official: Vince Apple-Chiarella

November 12, 2016	Connecticut	4–2	Albany	Storrs, Connecticut
6:00 p.m. EST	Alexa Casimiro 4'; Stephanie Ribeiro 9'; Rachel Hill 51'; Maddie Damm 80'	Report	Mariah Williams 43', 89'	Stadium: Morrone Stadium; Attendance: 641; Referee: Jan Halaska; Assistant referees: Amilcar Sicaju; Michael Correia; Fourth official: Matt Mercier

November 12, 2016	TCU	0–1	Texas A&M	Fort Worth, Texas
8:00 p.m. EST		Report	Stephanie Malherbe 7'	Stadium: Garvey-Rosenthal Soccer Stadium; Attendance: 2,294; Referee: Mike Lavergne; Assistant referees: Gregorio Garza; Charles Farr; Fourth official: John Navarro

==== Second round ====
November 18, 2016	#3 Florida State	1–2	Utah	Los Angeles, California
2:00 p.m. EST	Macayla Edwards 18'	Report	Natalie Vukic 14'; Haylee Cacciacarne 88'	Stadium: McAlister Field; Attendance: 0 Referee: Michael Zapata; Assistant referees: Salma Perez; Ceciah Valero; Fourth official: Robert Sarfaraz

November 18, 2016	#4 Auburn	4–1	Connecticut	Gainesville, Florida
3:00 p.m. EST	Kristen Dodson 5'; Gianna Montini 40'; Brooke Ramsier 42'; Bri Folds 71'	Report	Maddie Damm 1'	Stadium: Donald R. Dizney Stadium; Referee: Jonathan Weiner; Assistant referees: Trent Vanhaitsma; Jamie Willis; Fourth official: Lance Vanhaitsma

November 18, 2016	#2 USC	0–0 (a.e.t.) (4–3 p)	Texas A&M	Los Angeles, California
4:30 p.m. EST		Report		Stadium: McAlister Field; Attendance: 445; Referee: Ian Anderson; Assistant referees: Cameron Blanchard; Michelle Provan; Fourth official: Magic Berenji
	Penalties
	Mandy Freeman (penalty scored); Kayla Mills (penalty scored); Morgan Andrews (penalty missed); Amanda Rooney (penalty scored); Alex Anthony (penalty scored)		(penalty missed) Sarah Shaw; (penalty scored) Mikaela Harvey; (penalty scored) Brittany Crabtree; (penalty missed) Grace Piper; (penalty scored) Haley Pounds

November 18, 2016	#1 Florida	3–2 (a.e.t.)	Wisconsin	Gainesville, Florida
7:00 p.m. EST	Meggie Dougherty Howard 53' (pen.); Unknown 78' (o.g.); Brooke Sharp 107'	Report	Micaela Powers 66' (pen.); Dani Rhodes 77'	Stadium: Donald R. Dizney Stadium; Attendance: 1,088; Referee: Lance Vanhaitsma; Assistant referees: Eric Proctor; Hassan Belmnahia; Fourth official: Jonathan Weiner

==== Round of 16 ====
November 20, 2016	#1 Florida	1–3	#4 Auburn	Gainesville, Florida
2:00 p.m. EST	Brooke Sharp 62'	Report	Brooke Ramsier 26'; Bri Folds 62' (pen.); Kristen Dodson 85'	Stadium: Donald R. Dizney Stadium; Attendance: 1,152; Referee: Randy Cook; Assistant referees: Matt Jackson; Natalie Simon; Fourth official: David King

November 20, 2016	#2 USC	1–0	Utah	Los Angeles, California
3:00 p.m. EST	Leah Pruitt 73'	Report		Stadium: McAlister Field; Attendance: 419; Referee: Alex Chilowicz; Assistant referees: Kristin Patterson; Cameron Blanchard; Fourth official: Reyna Fonseca

==== Quarterfinals ====
November 25, 2016	#2 USC	1–0	#4 Auburn	Los Angeles, California
4:00 p.m. EST	Alex Anthony 4'	Report		Stadium: McAlister Field; Attendance: 650; Referee: Matthew Buckman; Assistant referees: Joseph Dickerson; Salma Perez; Fourth official: Bernhard Hosu

== South Carolina bracket ==
First round November 11, 12 or 13; Campus Sites
1	South Carolina*	7
Alabama State	0
Oklahoma State	1
Colorado*	3
Oklahoma*	1
SMU	0
UNLV	0
4	BYU*	2
3	Clemson*	1
Northeastern	0
Memphis	1
Arkansas*	2^{OT}
Kansas*	1^{2OT}
Missouri	0
Liberty	0
2	North Carolina*	3

Second round November 17 or 18; Regional Campus Sites
1	South Carolina*	1
Colorado	0
Oklahoma	1
4	BYU	2
3	Clemson	0 (4)
Arkansas	0 (2)
Kansas	0
2	North Carolina*	2

Round of 16; November 19 or 20; Regional Campus Sites
1	South Carolina*	1
4	BYU	0
3	Clemson	0
2	North Carolina*	1

Quarterfinals; November 25 or 26; Campus Sites
1	South Carolina*	0
2	North Carolina	1

=== Schedule ===
==== First round ====
November 11, 2016	#1 South Carolina	7–0	Alabama State	Columbia, South Carolina
7:00 p.m. EST	Savannah McCaskill 9'; Sophie Groff 13', 54'; Daija Griffin 17'; Chelsea Drennan 26'; Elexa Bahr 35'; Claire Studebaker 45'	Report		Stadium: Eugene E. Stone III Stadium; Attendance: 939; Referee: Howard Ash; Assistant referees: Kevin Roberts; Gregory Brigman; Fourth official: Derek Allison

November 11, 2016	Arkansas	2–1 (a.e.t.)	Memphis	Fayetteville, Arkansas
7:30 p.m. EST	Jessi Hartzler 88'; Lindsey Mayo 93'	Report	Hudson-Marks 43'	Stadium: Razorback Field; Attendance: 1,458; Referee: Jack Damrill; Assistant referees: Mark Herrington; Wade Beall; Fourth official: David Henderson

November 11, 2016	#4 BYU	2–0	UNLV	Provo, Utah
9:00 p.m. EST	Michele Vasconcelos 20'; Elena Medeiros 48'	Report		Stadium: South Field; Attendance: 3,276; Referee: Brad Jensen; Assistant referees: Jay Hutchinson; Kristi Mak; Fourth official: Scott Conner

November 11, 2016	Oklahoma	1–0	SMU	Norman, Oklahoma
9:00 p.m. EST	Paige Welch 12'	Report		Stadium: OU Soccer Complex; Attendance: 667; Referee: Timothy Debysingh; Assistant referees: Tony Guiliano; Matt Trotter; Fourth official: Roy Robinson

November 12, 2016	#2 North Carolina	3–0	Liberty	Chapel Hill, North Carolina
1:00 p.m. EST	Madison Schultz 41'; Dorian Bailey 59'; Abby Elinsky 70'	Report		Stadium: Fetzer Field; Attendance: 919; Referee: Danielle Chesky; Assistant referees: Joel Barber; R. Patrick Stephan; Fourth official: Jason Kent

November 12, 2016	Colorado	3–1	Oklahoma State	Boulder, Colorado
2:00 p.m. EST	Haley Woodard 18' (o.g.); Natalie Calhoun 37' (o.g.); Danica Evans 90'	Report	Courtney Dike 53'	Stadium: Prentup Field; Attendance: 1,181; Referee: Karen Abt; Assistant referees: Jacob Herold; Megan McCain; Fourth official: Younes Marrakchi

November 13, 2016	#3 Clemson	1–0	Northeastern	Clemson, South Carolina
1:00 p.m. EST	Shannon Horgan 61'	Report		Stadium: Riggs Field; Attendance: 229; Referee: David Jaye; Assistant referees: Eric Usher; Derek Allison; Fourth official: Jason Daniel

November 13, 2016	Kansas	1–0 (a.e.t.)	Missouri	Lawrence, Kansas
2:00 p.m. EST	Lois Heuchan 101'	Report		Stadium: Rock Chalk Park; Attendance: 1,483; Referee: Douglas Wolff; Assistant referees: Jack Feldman; Rey Ramirez; Fourth official: Tony Guiliano

==== Second round ====
November 17, 2016	#4 BYU	2–1	Oklahoma	Columbia, South Carolina
4:00 p.m. EST	Ashley Hatch 11'; Michele Vasconcelos 64'	Report	Rachel Ressler 82'	Stadium: Eugene E. Stone III Stadium; Attendance: 309; Referee: Kevin Broadley; Assistant referees: Gregory Brigman; Joshua Metcalf; Fourth official: Joseph Kirkpatrick

November 17, 2016	#1 South Carolina	1–0	Colorado	Columbia, South Carolina
7:00 p.m. EST	Sophie Groff 74' (pen.)	Report		Stadium: Eugene E. Stone III Stadium; Attendance: 1,384; Referee: Nima Saghafi; Assistant referees: Brian Marshall; Khadime Sabara; Fourth official: Wayne Pavlischek

November 18, 2016	#3 Clemson	0–0 (a.e.t.) (4–2 p)	Arkansas	Chapel Hill, North Carolina
3:00 p.m. EST		Report		Stadium: Fetzer Field; Attendance: 1,917; Referee: Elvis Mahmutovic; Assistant referees: Carmen Serbio; Michael Hil; Fourth official: Patrick Schmidt
	Penalties
	Claire Wagner (penalty scored); Kailen Sheridan (penalty scored); Jenna Polonsky (penalty scored); Catrina Atanda (penalty scored)		(penalty missed) Cailee Dennis; (penalty missed) Erika Miller; (penalty scored) Hannah Neece; (penalty scored) Lindsey Mayo

November 18, 2016	#2 North Carolina	2–0	Kansas	Chapel Hill, North Carolina
6:00 p.m. EST	Madison Schultz 53'; Maya Worth 79'	Report		Stadium: Fetzer Field; Attendance: 1,917; Referee: Bill Dittmar; Assistant referees: Jude Carr; Howard Ash; Fourth official: Kevin Uitto

==== Round of 16 ====
November 19, 2016	#1 South Carolina	1–0	#4 BYU	Columbia, South Carolina
7:00 p.m. EST	Chelsea Drennan 69' (pen.)	Report		Stadium: Eugene E. Stone III Stadium; Referee: Tori Penso; Assistant referees: Rick Rogers; Matt Jackson; Fourth official: Ashley Varnson

November 20, 2016	#2 North Carolina	1–0	#3 Clemson	Chapel Hill, North Carolina
1:00 p.m. EST	Dorian Bailey 71'	Report		Stadium: Fetzer Field; Attendance: 1,732; Referee: Tori Penso; Assistant referees: Danny Thornberry; Michael Hill; Fourth official: Doug Hartemann

==== Quarterfinals ====
November 25, 2016	#1 South Carolina	0–1	#2 North Carolina	Columbia, South Carolina
6:00 p.m. EST		Report	Madison Schultz 22'	Stadium: Eugene E. Stone III Stadium; Attendance: 2,507; Referee: Elvis Mahmutovic; Assistant referees: Brandon Marion; Benjamin Wooten; Fourth official: David Jaye

== West Virginia bracket ==
First round November 11, 12 or 13; Campus Sites
1	West Virginia*	3
Northern Kentucky	0
Dayton	2
Ohio State*	3
Nebraska*	0 (3)
South Dakota State	0 (0)
Seattle	0
4	UCLA*	3
3	Duke*	3
Charlotte	0
Illinois State	2 (5)
Michigan*	2 (4)
Northwestern*	3
Kent State	0
SIU Edwardsville	0 (5)
2	Notre Dame*	0 (4)

Second round November 18; Regional Campus Sites
1	West Virginia*	1^{2OT}
Ohio State	0
Nebraska	0
4	UCLA	2
3	Duke*	3
Illinois State	1
Northwestern	1
SIU Edwardsville	0

Round of 16; November 20; Regional Campus Sites
1	West Virginia*	1 (4)
4	UCLA	1 (2)
3	Duke*	1
Northwestern	0

Quarterfinals; November 25 or 26; Campus Sites
1	West Virginia*	1
3	Duke	0

=== Schedule ===
==== First round ====
November 11, 2016	#2 Notre Dame	0–0 (a.e.t.) (4–5 p)	SIU Edwardsville	Notre Dame, Indiana
7:00 p.m. EST		Report		Stadium: Alumni Stadium; Attendance: 261; Referee: Alex Beehler; Assistant referees: Ethan Buege; Eulogio Villalpando; Fourth official: Joe Brice
	Penalties
	Taylor Klawunder (penalty scored); Kaleigh Olmsted (penalty scored); Katie Uhler (penalty missed); Emily Geyer (penalty scored); Ginny McGowan (penalty scored); Cindy Pineda (penalty missed)		(penalty scored) Cory Levels; (penalty scored) Peyton Roehnelt; (penalty scored) Becca Jostes; (penalty missed) Taylor Reynolds; (penalty scored) Avery Anderson; (penalty scored) Mariah Vollmer

November 11, 2016	Nebraska	0–0 (a.e.t.) (3–0 p)	South Dakota State	Lincoln, Nebraska
8:00 p.m. EST		Report		Stadium: Barbara Hibner Soccer Stadium; Attendance: 1,257; Referee: Trent Payne; Assistant referees: Emily Fletcher; Phillip Gomez; Fourth official: Bobby Simetech
	Penalties
	Courtney Claassen (penalty scored); Jaycie Johnson (penalty missed); Caroline Flynn (penalty scored); Sydney Miramontez (penalty scored)		(penalty missed) Ashley Adams; (penalty missed) Nicole Hatcher; (penalty missed) Annie Williams

November 11, 2016	#4 UCLA	3–0	Seattle	Los Angeles, California
10:00 p.m. EST	Anika Rodríguez 4'; Zoey Goralski 60'; Amber Munerlyn 83'	Report		Stadium: Drake Stadium; Attendance: 652; Referee: Chris Calderon; Assistant referees: Kristin Patterson; Trevor Rappleye; Fourth official: Reyna Fonseca

November 12, 2016	#3 Duke	3–0	Charlotte	Durham, North Carolina
1:00 p.m. EST	Ella Stevens 11'; Toni Payne 50'; Mia Gyau 69'	Report		Stadium: Koskinen Stadium; Attendance: 664; Referee: Patrick Schmidt; Assistant referees: Scott Bowers; Jeremy L. B. Smith; Fourth official: Michael Hill

November 12, 2016	#1 West Virginia	3–0	Northern Kentucky	Morgantown, West Virginia
3:00 p.m. EST	Heather Kaleiohi 1'; Michaela Abam 53'; Ashley Lawrence 76'	Report		Stadium: Dick Dlesk Soccer Stadium; Attendance: 1,646; Referee: John Brady; Assistant referees: Charles Murphy; Lucas Feathers; Fourth official: Brian Opiela

November 12, 2016	Northwestern	3–0	Kent State	Evanston, Illinois
4:00 p.m. EST	Kayla Sharples 18'; Nandi Mehta 20'; Kassidy Gorman 83'	Report		Stadium: Martin Stadium; Attendance: 523; Referee: Rachel Smith; Assistant referees: Maciej Telus; Tim Scuri; Fourth official: Sergio Alvarez

November 12, 2016	Ohio State	3–2	Dayton	Columbus, Ohio
6:00 p.m. EST	Sammy Edwards 14'; Nikki Walts 56', 86'	Report	Alexis Kiehl 45'; Libby Leedom 56'	Stadium: Jesse Owens Memorial Stadium; Attendance: 880; Referee: Nikola Aleksic; Assistant referees: Art Arustamyan; Dimitar Chavdarov

November 12, 2016	Michigan	2–2 (a.e.t.) (4–5 p)	Illinois State	Ann Arbor, Michigan
7:00 p.m. EST	Jada Dayne 51'; Nicky Waldeck 75'	Report	Lauren Koehl 37'; Emily Dickman 68'	Stadium: UM Soccer Stadium; Attendance: 625; Referee: Tori Penso; Assistant referees: Miriama Kocisova; Doug Ferguson; Fourth official: Ron Stuver
	Penalties
	Reilly Martin (penalty scored); Nicky Waldeck (penalty scored); Anna Soccorsi (penalty scored); Ani Sarkisian (penalty scored); Abby Kastroll (penalty missed)		(penalty scored) Hannah Rodgers; (penalty scored) Kara Morway; (penalty scored) Kelli Zickert; (penalty scored) Kate Del Fava; (penalty scored) Kiley Czerwinski

==== Second round ====
November 18, 2016	#4 UCLA	2–0	Nebraska	Morgantown, West Virginia
3:00 p.m. EST	Annie Alvarado 4'; Amber Munerlyn 87'	Report		Stadium: Dick Dlesk Soccer Stadium; Attendance: 82; Referee: Peter Dhima; Assistant referees: Mark Garcia; Thomas Brown; Fourth official: Eric Rolf

November 18, 2016	Northwestern	1–0	SIU Edwardsville	Durham, North Carolina
3:30 p.m. EST	Kassidy Gorman 10'	Report		Stadium: Koskinen Stadium; Attendance: 0 Referee: Brandon Marion; Assistant referees: Larry Stroud; Robert Dail; Fourth official: Raymond Thomas

November 18, 2016	#1 West Virginia	1–0 (a.e.t.)	Ohio State	Morgantown, West Virginia
6:00 p.m. EST	Michaela Abam 104'	Report		Stadium: Dick Dlesk Soccer Stadium; Attendance: 2,471; Referee: Shaun Papperman; Assistant referees: Paul Deverse; Jeffrey Mellen; Fourth official: John Woodruff

November 18, 2016	#3 Duke	3–1	Illinois State	Durham, North Carolina
6:30 p.m. EST	Toni Payne 48', 78'; Casey Martinez 79'	Report	Brooke Ksiazek 75'	Stadium: Koskinen Stadium; Attendance: 617; Referee: Daniel Burak; Assistant referees: Robert Velbis; Jeremy L. B. Smith; Fourth official: Abbas Piran

==== Round of 16 ====
November 20, 2016	#3 Duke	1–0	Northwestern	Durham, North Carolina
2:00 p.m. EST	Ella Stevens 33'	Report		Stadium: Koskinen Stadium; Attendance: 455; Referee: Elvis Mahmutovic; Assistant referees: Neil Barbulescu; Patrick Schmidt; Fourth official: Javier Rodriguez

November 20, 2016	#1 West Virginia	1–1 (a.e.t.) (4–2 p)	#4 UCLA	Morgantown, West Virginia
2:30 p.m. EST	Sh'Nia Gordon 23'	Report	Jessie Fleming 89'	Stadium: Dick Dlesk Soccer Stadium; Attendance: 735; Referee: Charles Murphy; Assistant referees: Amadou Diop; Ryan Slack; Fourth official: Matthew Richardson
	Penalties
	Carla Portillo (penalty scored); Michaela Abam (penalty missed); Ashley Lawrence (penalty scored); Amandine Pierre-Louis (penalty scored); Kadeisha Buchanan (penalty scored)		(penalty scored) Lauren Kaskie; (penalty missed) Jessie Fleming; (penalty missed) Courtney Proctor; (penalty scored) Sunny Dunphy

==== Quarterfinals ====
November 26, 2016	#1 West Virginia	1–0	#3 Duke	Morgantown, West Virginia
3:00 p.m. EST	Alli Magaletta 16'	Report		Stadium: Dick Dlesk Soccer Stadium; Attendance: 1,684; Referee: Mark Gorak; Assistant referees: Lucas Feathers; Jon Safar; Fourth official: Brenda Magoba

== College Cup ==
Semifinals; December 2 Avaya Stadium; San Jose, California
2	Georgetown	0
2	USC	1
2	North Carolina	0
1	West Virginia	1

Championship; December 4 Avaya Stadium; San Jose, California
2	USC	3
1	West Virginia	1

=== Schedule ===
==== Final Four ====
December 2, 2016	#1 West Virginia	1–0	#2 North Carolina	San Jose, California
5:00 p.m. EST	Michaela Abam 74'	Report		Stadium: Avaya Stadium; Attendance: 4,293; Referee: Karen Abt; Assistant referees: Felisha Mariscal; Jennifer Garner; Fourth official: Andrew Hanks

December 2, 2016	#2 USC	1–0	#2 Georgetown	San Jose, California
7:30 p.m. EST	Katie Johnson 60'	Report		Stadium: Avaya Stadium; Attendance: 4,293; Referee: Shane Butler; Assistant referees: Amanda Ross; Jeff Greeson; Fourth official: Andrew Hanks

==== Championship ====
December 4, 2016	#1 West Virginia	1–3	#2 USC	San Jose, California
6:00 p.m. EST	Ashley Lawrence 66'	Report	Morgan Andrews 2'; Katie Johnson 75', 87'	Stadium: Avaya Stadium; Attendance: 6,612; Referee: Corey Rockwell; Assistant referees: Jennifer Garner; Felisha Mariscal; Fourth official: Shane Butler

== Statistics ==
=== Goalscorers ===
There were 151 goals scored in 63 matches, for an average of 2.4 goals per match.

4 goals

- (United States) Brooke Ramsier – Auburn

3 goals

- (Nigeria) Toni Payne – Duke
- (United States) Madison Schultz – North Carolina
- (United States) Sophie Groff – South Carolina
- (United States) Morgan Andrews – USC
- (Mexico) Katie Johnson – USC
- (Cameroon) Michaela Abam – West Virginia

2 goals

- (United States) Mariah Williams – Albany
- (United States) Kristen Dodson – Auburn
- (United States) Bri Folds – Auburn
- (United States) Michele Vasconcelos – BYU
- (United States) Maddie Damm – Connecticut
- (United States) Ella Stevens – Duke
- (United States) Meggie Dougherty Howard – Florida
- (United States) Brooke Sharp – Florida
- (United States) Marina Paul – Georgetown
- (United States) Dorian Bailey – North Carolina
- (United States) Kassidy Gorman – Northwestern
- (United States) Nikki Walts – Ohio State
- (United States) Maddie Gonzalez – Santa Clara
- (United States) Jordan Jesolva – Santa Clara
- (United States) Chelsea Drennan – South Carolina
- (United States) Charlotte Williams – Penn State
- (United States) Madison Tiernan – Rutgers
- (United States) Amber Munerlyn – UCLA
- (United States) Alexis Shaffer – Virginia
- (Canada) Ashley Lawrence – West Virginia

1 goal

- (United States) Jessi Hartzler – Arkansas
- (United States) Lindsey Mayo – Arkansas
- (United States) Haley Gerken – Auburn
- (United States) Gianna Montini – Auburn
- (United States) Casie Ramsier – Auburn
- (United States) Ashley Hatch – BYU
- (United States) Elena Medeiros – BYU
- (United States) Arielle Ship – California
- (United States) Shannon Horgan – Clemson
- (United States) Danica Evans – Colorado
- (United States) Alexa Casimiro – Connecticut
- (United States) Rachel Hill – Connecticut
- (Portugal) Stephanie Ribeiro – Connecticut
- (United States) Alexis Kiehl – Dayton
- (United States) Libby Leedom – Dayton
- (United States) Mia Gyau – Duke
- (United States) Casey Martinez – Duke
- (United States) Devan Talley – Eastern Washington
- (United States) Savannah Jordan – Florida
- (United States) Julia Lester – Florida
- (United States) Malia Berkely – Florida State
- (Venezuela) Deyna Castellanos – Florida State
- (Republic of Ireland) Megan Connolly – Florida State
- (United States) Macayla Edwards – Florida State
- (Finland) Heidi Kollanen – Florida State
- (United States) Amanda Carolan – Georgetown
- (United States) Rachel Corboz – Georgetown
- (United States) Grace Damaska – Georgetown
- (United States) Crystal Thomas – Georgetown
- (United States) Emily Dickman – Illinois State
- (United States) Lauren Koehl – Illinois State
- (United States) Brooke Ksiazek – Illinois State
- (Scotland) Lois Heuchan – Kansas
- (Jamaica) Chanel Hudson-Marks – Memphis
- (United States) Jada Dayne – Michigan
- (United States) Nicky Waldeck – Michigan
- (United States) Rachael Ivanicki – Monmouth
- (United States) Taylor Porter – NC State
- (United States) Abby Elinsky – North Carolina
- (United States) Maya Worth – North Carolina
- (United States) Nandi Mehta – Northwestern
- (United States) Kayla Sharples – Northwestern
- (United States) Sammy Edwards – Ohio State
- (United States) Rachel Ressler – Oklahoma
- (United States) Paige Welch – Oklahoma
- (Nigeria) Courtney Dike – Oklahoma State
- (Puerto Rico) Nickolette Driesse – Penn State
- (United States) Emma Hasco – Penn State
- (United States) Megan Schafer – Penn State
- (Republic of Ireland) Marissa Sheva – Penn State
- (United States) Danielle Thomas – Pepperdine
- (United States) Taylor Aylmer – Rutgers
- (Canada) Brittany Ambrose – Santa Clara
- (United States) Jenna Holtz – Santa Clara
- (England) Julie Vass – Santa Clara
- (Colombia) Elexa Bahr – South Carolina
- (United States) Daija Griffin – South Carolina
- (United States) Savannah McCaskill – South Carolina
- (United States) Claire Studebaker – South Carolina
- (Republic of Ireland) Kyra Carusa – Stanford
- (United States) Logan Karam – Stanford
- (United States) Sam Tran – Stanford
- (United States) Michelle Xiao – Stanford
- (South Africa) Stephanie Malherbe – Texas A&M
- (United States) Annie Alvarado – UCLA
- (Canada) Jessie Fleming – UCLA
- (United States) Zoey Goralski – UCLA
- (Mexico) Anika Rodríguez – UCLA
- (United States) Alex Anthony – USC
- (United States) Nicole Molen – USC
- (United States) Leah Pruitt – USC
- (United States) Haylee Cacciacarne – Utah
- (United States) Katie Rogers – Utah
- (United States) Natalie Vukic – Utah
- (United States) Betsy Brandon – Virginia
- (United States) Meghan Cox – Virginia
- (United States) Kristen McNabb – Virginia
- (United States) Morgan Reuther – Virginia
- (United States) Taylor Ziemer – Virginia
- (United States) Sh'Nia Gordon – West Virginia
- (United States) Heather Kaleiohi – West Virginia
- (United States) Alli Magaletta – West Virginia
- (United States) Rose Lavelle – Wisconsin
- (United States) Micaela Powers – Wisconsin
- (United States) Dani Rhodes – Wisconsin

1 own goal

- (United States) Natalie Calhoun – Oklahoma State (playing against Colorado)
- (United States) Haley Woodard – Oklahoma State (playing against Colorado)
- Unknown – Virginia (playing against Georgetown)
- Unknown – Wisconsin (playing against Florida)

== See also ==
- NCAA Women's Soccer Championships (Division II, Division III)
- NCAA Men's Soccer Championships (Division I, Division II, Division III)
