= Holy Cross Crusaders women's soccer =

American college soccer team

- University: College of the Holy Cross
- Head coach: Ben Graham
- Location: Worcester, Massachusetts
- Nickname: Crusaders
- Colors: Royal purple

NCAA tournament appearances
- 2000

Conference tournament championships
- 2000

The Holy Cross Crusaders women's soccer team represents College of the Holy Cross in NCAA Division I college soccer. Holy Cross competes in the Patriot League.

== History ==
The Holy Cross women's soccer program began play in 1983 and Patriot League conference competition in 1990.

In 2000, the Crusaders won their first and to-date only Patriot League championship and made their first NCAA tournament appearance. They lost in the first round to Boston U.
