= 2019 NCAA Division I women's soccer season =

American college soccer season

- Top goalscorer: Catarina Macario

Statistics

Tournament
- Duration: November 15–December 8, 2019
- Most conference bids: 9 – ACC & Pac-12

College Cup
- Date: December 8, 2019
- Site: Avaya Stadium, San Jose, California
- Champions: Stanford
- Runners-up: North Carolina

Seasons
- ← 2018 2020 →

The 2019 NCAA Division I women's soccer season was the 38th season of NCAA championship women's college soccer.

== Preseason ==
=== Coaching changes ===
Program	Outgoing coach	Manner of departure	Date of vacancy	Incoming coach	Date of appointment	References
Arkansas-Pine Bluff	Ted Flogaites	Resigned	January 17, 2019	Jeremy Winzer	May 6, 2019	
Boston College	Alison Foley	Resigned	December 11, 2018	Jason Lowe	January 9, 2019	
Central Michigan	Peter McGahey	Contract Expired	November 2, 2018	Jeremy Groves	December 4, 2018	
Eastern Kentucky	Nick Flohre	Resigned for family reasons	November 11, 2018	Matt Cosinuke	January 3, 2019	
Green Bay	Wojtek Krakowiak (interim)	Interim Coach	None listed	Jason Spain	January 10, 2019	
Idaho State	Allison Gibson	Contract Expired	October 29, 2018	Debs Brereton	December 4, 2018	
Indiana	Amy Berbary	Contract Expired	November 8, 2018	Erwin van Bennekom	December 4, 2018	
Iona	Sarah Brady	Resigned	October 3, 2018	Todd Plourde	January 11, 2019	
Jackson State	Dean Joseph	None listed	None listed	Ted Flogaites	January 22, 2019	
Louisiana	Scot Wieland	Resigned	October 22, 2018	Lance Key	December 6, 2018	
Loyola (Maryland)	Naomi Meiburger	Resigned	November 22, 2018	Joe Mallia	December 18, 2018	
LSU	Brian Lee	Resigned	March 29, 2019	Debbie Hensley	June 24, 2019	
Mississippi State	Tom Anagnost	Resigned	January 4, 2019	James Armstrong	January 18, 2019	
Nicholls	Mac McBride	Resigned	January 31, 2019	Danny Free	July 3, 2019	
North Florida	Robin Confer	Resigned	November 26, 2018	Eric Faulconer	November 26, 2019	
Northern Arizona	Andre Luciano	Resigned	December 5, 2018	Kylie Louw	March 5, 2019	
Oregon State	Linus Rhode	Not Retained	November 5, 2018	Matt Kagan	December 18, 2018	
Rice	Nicky Adams	Resigned	February 25, 2019	Brian Lee	March 29, 2019	
Seton Hall	Rick Stainton	Pursue other opportunities	October 29, 2018	Ciara Crinion	December 12, 2018	
Stony Brook	Brendan Faherty	Resigned	December 19, 2018	Tobias Bischof	January 24, 2019	
Stetson	Manoj Khettry	Contract Expired	November 1, 2018	Chris Bergmann	December 26, 2018	
Syracuse	Phil Wheddon	Pursue other opportunities	October 26, 2018	Nicky Adams	February 25, 2019	
Texas Southern	Kathryn Balogun	Resigned	December 10, 2018	Lindsay Vera	March 4, 2019	
UC Davis	Twila Kaufman	Resigned	April 12, 2019	Tracy Hamm	May 6, 2019	
UIC	Brian Rigby	Not Retained	November 8, 2018	Tom Anagnost	January 7, 2019	
UNC Asheville	Lindsay Vera	None listed	None listed	Clifton Bush	April 2, 2019	
UTEP	Kevin Cross	Fired	October 29, 2018	Kathryn Balogun	December 10, 2018	
VMI	Chris Bergmann	Resigned	December 26, 2018	Chris Haught-Thompson	February 1, 2019	
Wofford	Eric Lewis (interim)	Interim Coach	None listed	Emily Grant	January 2, 2019	
Yale	Rudy Meredith	Resigned, as part of an admissions scandal	November 15, 2018	Brendan Faherty	December 19, 2018	

=== New programs ===
The Merrimack Warriors began the transition from Division II to Division I and joined the Northeast Conference.

Long Island University announced in October 2018 that its two then-current athletic programs—the Division I LIU Brooklyn Blackbirds and the Division II LIU Post Pioneers—would merge into a single Division I athletic program under the LIU name after the 2018–19 school year. The unified program, which maintains LIU Brooklyn's Division I and Northeast Conference memberships, announced its new nickname of Sharks on May 15, 2019. With both campuses sponsoring women's soccer, the two teams became a single LIU team based at the Post campus in Nassau County, New York in the 2019 season.

Three schools that sponsor women's soccer began transitions from Division II in the 2020–21 school year. Bellarmine joinrf the ASUN Conference, Dixie State (Note: Now known as Utah Tech) joined the Western Athletic Conference, and UC San Diego will join the Big West Conference.

==== Rebranded programs ====
In addition to LIU, one other Division I women's soccer program assumed a new athletic identity during the 2018–19 offseason. On July 1, 2019, the University of Missouri–Kansas City (UMKC) announced that its athletic program, previously known as the UMKC Kangaroos, would henceforth be known as the Kansas City Roos, with "Roos" having long been used as a short form of the historic "Kangaroos" nickname.

=== Conference realignment ===
School	Previous Conference	New Conference
Merrimack	Northeast-10 Conference (NCAA Division II)	Northeast Conference

This was also the final season for four programs in their current conferences. The Cal State Bakersfield Roadrunners and Kansas City Roos will both leave the Western Athletic Conference in July 2020, with the Roadrunners joining the Big West Conference and the Roos returning to their former conference home of the Summit League. At the same time, the Purdue Fort Wayne Mastodons will leave the Summit League for the Horizon League, and the UConn Huskies will leave the American Athletic Conference to join several of their former conference mates in the Big East Conference.

== Season outlook ==
=== Preseason polls ===
United Soccer Coaches
Rank	Team
1	Florida State
2	North Carolina
3	Stanford
4	UCLA
5	USC
6	Penn State
7	Georgetown
8	Duke
9	Virginia
10	Tennessee
11	West Virginia
12	Texas A&M
13	Santa Clara
14	Baylor
15	South Carolina
16	Wisconsin
17	Vanderbilt
18	South Florida
19	Texas
20	Memphis
21	NC State
22	Texas Tech
23	Wake Forest
24	LSU
25	Virginia Tech

Top Drawer Soccer
Rank	Team
1	Florida State
2	UCLA
3	North Carolina
4	Stanford
5	Virginia
6	Penn State
7	USC
8	Georgetown
9	Santa Clara
10	Vanderbilt
11	Texas A&M
12	Tennessee
13	Texas
14	South Florida
15	Washington State
16	South Carolina
17	Duke
18	West Virginia
19	Rutgers
20	Saint Louis
21	NC State
22	BYU
23	Princeton
24	Memphis
25	Baylor

Soccer America
Rank	Team
1	Florida State
2	Stanford
3	UCLA
4	North Carolina
5	USC
6	Penn State
7	Georgetown
8	Virginia
9	Santa Clara
10	Texas A&M
11	Baylor
12	Duke
13	Vanderbilt
14	West Virginia
15	South Florida
16	Tennessee
17	Texas
18	Rutgers
19	South Carolina
20	Texas Tech
21	Wisconsin
22	Clemson
23	Washington State
24	NC State
25	Colorado

== Regular season ==
=== Major upsets ===
In this list, a "major upset" is defined as a game won by a team ranked 10 or more spots lower or an unranked team that defeats a team ranked #15 or higher.

All rankings are from the United Soccer Coaches Poll.

Date	Winner	Score	Loser
August 25	No. 21 NC State	3–1	No. 7 Georgetown
August 29	Rutgers	1–0	No. 11 Tennessee
September 5	Santa Clara	2–0	No. 2 UCLA
September 6	Iowa	1–0	No. 14 NC State
September 6	DePaul	1–0	No. 11 Kansas
September 12	Oklahoma State	2–1	No. 8 Penn State
September 13	Michigan	2–1	No. 13 Washington State
September 15	Arkansas	2–0	No. 1 North Carolina
September 15	Louisville	1–0	No. 9 Vanderbilt
September 15	UC Santa Barbara	1–0	No. 2 Stanford
September 22	Wisconsin	2–1	No. 13 Rutgers
September 27	California	2–1	No. 7 UCLA
September 29	Florida	1–0	No. 15 Vanderbilt
October 6	Florida	3–1	No. 12 Texas A&M
October 10	No. 25 Arizona	1–0	No. 15 Washington State
October 18	California	3–0	No. 4 USC
October 18	TCU	2–1	No. 13 Texas Tech
October 24	DePaul	1–0 (OT)	No. 14 Georgetown
October 24	Miami (FL)	3–2 (2OT)	No. 15 Clemson
October 28	Washington	2–0	No. 7 USC
November 3	Purdue	1–0	No. 7 Wisconsin
November 3	NC State	2–1 (OT)	No. 14 Louisville
November 8	Michigan	2–1	No. 15 Rutgers
November 8	TCU	2–1	No. 13 Texas Tech
November 10	South Florida	2–0	No. 8 Memphis
November 10	No. 21 Kansas	2–1 (2OT)	No. 10 Oklahoma State
November 22	Washington State	3–2	No. 3 Virginia

=== Conference standings ===
2019 American Athletic Conference women's soccer standings
	Conf.						Overall
Team	W		L		T	PCT	W		L		T	PCT
No. 21 Memphis ‍†‍‍^{y}	8	–	0	–	1	.944	17	–	3	–	1	.833
No. 16 USF ‍‍‡‍^{y}	7	–	2	–	0	.778	16	–	5	–	0	.762
UCF ‍‍‍	5	–	2	–	2	.667	11	–	4	–	4	.684
Cincinnati ‍‍‍	5	–	3	–	1	.611	7	–	9	–	3	.447
SMU ‍‍‍	4	–	5	–	0	.444	12	–	7	–	1	.625
Houston ‍‍‍	3	–	6	–	0	.333	6	–	14	–	0	.300
UConn ‍‍‍	2	–	5	–	2	.333	6	–	8	–	3	.441
Temple ‍‍‍	2	–	5	–	2	.333	5	–	9	–	5	.395
East Carolina ‍‍‍	2	–	5	–	2	.333	5	–	10	–	3	.361
Tulsa ‍‍‍	2	–	7	–	0	.222	8	–	11	–	0	.421
† – Conference champion ‡ – 2019 AAC Tournament champion y – Invited to the NCAA tournament As of December 11, 2019; Rankings from United Soccer Coaches Poll; Source:American Athletic Conference

2019 America East Conference women's soccer standings
	Conf.						Overall
Team	W		L		T	PCT	W		L		T	PCT
Stony Brook ‍†‍‡‍^{y}	6	–	1	–	1	.813	14	–	6	–	1	.690
Albany ‍†‍‍	6	–	1	–	1	.813	9	–	6	–	3	.583
Hartford ‍‍‍	5	–	2	–	1	.688	10	–	7	–	2	.579
New Hampshire ‍‍‍	5	–	3	–	0	.625	10	–	8	–	0	.556
Binghamton ‍‍‍	4	–	3	–	1	.563	10	–	6	–	2	.611
UMass Lowell ‍‍‍	3	–	4	–	1	.438	4	–	11	–	2	.294
Vermont ‍‍‍	1	–	6	–	2	.222	3	–	10	–	3	.281
Maine ‍‍‍	1	–	6	–	1	.188	5	–	8	–	1	.393
UMBC ‍‍‍	1	–	7	–	0	.125	2	–	13	–	2	.176
† – Conference champion ‡ – 2019 America East Tournament champion y – Invited to the NCAA tournament As of December 9, 2019; Rankings from United Soccer Coaches Poll; Source:America East Conference

2019 Atlantic 10 Conference women's soccer standings
	Conf.						Overall
Team	W		L		T	PCT	W		L		T	PCT
Saint Louis ‍†‍‡‍^{y}	9	–	0	–	1	.950	17	–	4	–	2	.783
George Washington ‍‍‍	7	–	1	–	2	.800	14	–	3	–	4	.762
UMass ‍‍‍	6	–	3	–	1	.650	10	–	6	–	3	.605
La Salle ‍‍‍	6	–	4	–	0	.600	11	–	8	–	1	.575
Dayton ‍‍‍	5	–	3	–	2	.600	7	–	9	–	3	.447
Fordham ‍‍‍	4	–	4	–	2	.500	5	–	11	–	4	.350
Saint Joseph's ‍‍‍	4	–	5	–	1	.450	7	–	10	–	2	.421
Duquesne ‍‍‍	4	–	5	–	1	.450	6	–	8	–	3	.441
Richmond ‍‍‍	4	–	6	–	0	.400	7	–	9	–	2	.444
VCU ‍‍‍	3	–	5	–	2	.400	9	–	6	–	3	.583
Davidson ‍‍‍	3	–	5	–	2	.400	8	–	8	–	3	.500
St. Bonaventure ‍‍‍	3	–	6	–	1	.350	7	–	10	–	1	.417
Rhode Island ‍‍‍	1	–	6	–	3	.250	4	–	9	–	5	.361
George Mason ‍‍‍	1	–	7	–	2	.200	3	–	11	–	3	.265
† – Conference champion ‡ – 2019 Atlantic 10 Tournament champion y – Invited to the NCAA tournament As of December 9, 2019; Rankings from United Soccer Coaches Poll; Source:A10 Conference

2019 Atlantic Sun Conference women's soccer standings
	Conf.						Overall
Team	W		L		T	PCT	W		L		T	PCT
Florida Gulf Coast ‍†‍‍	6	–	1	–	1	.813	11	–	4	–	2	.706
Lipscomb ‍†‍‡‍^{y}	6	–	1	–	1	.813	13	–	6	–	2	.667
Liberty ‍‍‍	6	–	2	–	0	.750	10	–	7	–	2	.579
North Florida ‍‍‍	5	–	2	–	1	.688	11	–	6	–	2	.632
Kennesaw St. ‍‍‍	5	–	3	–	0	.625	11	–	7	–	2	.600
NJIT ‍‍‍	3	–	4	–	1	.438	7	–	8	–	3	.472
North Alabama ‍‍‍	2	–	6	–	0	.250	6	–	11	–	0	.353
Stetson ‍‍‍	0	–	7	–	1	.063	2	–	13	–	2	.176
Jacksonville ‍‍‍	0	–	7	–	1	.063	0	–	13	–	3	.094
† – Conference champion ‡ – 2019 ASUN Tournament champion y – Invited to the NCAA tournament As of December 9, 2019; Rankings from United Soccer Coaches Poll; Source:Atlantic Sun Conference

2019 ACC women's soccer standings
	Conf.						Overall
Team	W		L		T	PCT	W		L		T	PCT
No. 2 North Carolina ‍†‍‡‍^{y}	9	–	0	–	1	.950	24	–	1	–	2	.926
No. 7 Florida State ‍‍‍^{y}	8	–	2	–	0	.800	18	–	6	–	0	.750
No. 9 Virginia ‍‍‍^{y}	6	–	0	–	3	.833	17	–	2	–	3	.841
No. 25 Louisville ‍‍‍^{y}	5	–	3	–	2	.600	13	–	5	–	2	.700
No. 17 NC State ‍‍‍^{y}	4	–	2	–	4	.600	12	–	7	–	4	.609
No. 18 Duke ‍‍‍^{y}	3	–	1	–	6	.600	9	–	4	–	7	.625
Clemson ‍‍‍^{y}	5	–	5	–	0	.500	11	–	7	–	2	.600
Notre Dame ‍‍‍^{y}	4	–	4	–	2	.500	11	–	8	–	2	.571
Virginia Tech ‍‍‍^{y}	4	–	4	–	2	.500	12	–	5	–	2	.684
Pittsburgh ‍‍‍	2	–	6	–	2	.300	5	–	10	–	3	.361
Miami ‍‍‍	2	–	7	–	1	.250	5	–	9	–	2	.375
Wake Forest ‍‍‍	1	–	6	–	3	.250	6	–	8	–	4	.444
Syracuse ‍‍‍	1	–	7	–	1	.167	3	–	11	–	2	.250
Boston College ‍‍‍	1	–	8	–	1	.150	8	–	8	–	2	.500
† – Conference champion ‡ – 2019 ACC Tournament champion y – Invited to the NCAA Tournament; As of December 10, 2019; Rankings from United Soccer Coaches Poll; Source: The ACC

2019 Big East Conference women's soccer standings
	Conf.						Overall
Team	W		L		T	PCT	W		L		T	PCT
No. 24 Xavier ‍†‍‡‍^{y}	7	–	2	–	0	.778	17	–	4	–	2	.783
Georgetown ‍‍‍^{y}	6	–	1	–	2	.778	13	–	5	–	3	.690
Butler ‍‍‍	5	–	2	–	2	.667	10	–	5	–	4	.632
Villanova ‍‍‍	5	–	3	–	1	.611	10	–	7	–	3	.575
DePaul ‍‍‍	5	–	3	–	1	.611	8	–	8	–	3	.500
Providence ‍‍‍	3	–	5	–	1	.389	8	–	9	–	3	.475
Marquette ‍‍‍	3	–	5	–	1	.389	6	–	11	–	1	.361
Creighton ‍‍‍	2	–	4	–	3	.389	8	–	7	–	3	.528
St. John's ‍‍‍	2	–	6	–	1	.278	5	–	12	–	1	.306
Seton Hall ‍‍‍	1	–	8	–	0	.111	2	–	13	–	1	.156
† – Conference champion ‡ – 2019 Big East Tournament champion y – Invited to the NCAA tournament As of December 10, 2019; Rankings from United Soccer Coaches Poll; Source:The Big East Conference

2019 Big Sky Conference women's soccer standings
	Conf.						Overall
Team	W		L		T	PCT	W		L		T	PCT
Montana ‍†‍‍	6	–	0	–	3	.833	7	–	6	–	6	.526
Sacramento St. ‍‍‍	5	–	0	–	4	.778	11	–	2	–	6	.737
Eastern Washington ‍‍‍	6	–	2	–	1	.722	11	–	8	–	2	.571
Northern Colorado ‍‍‡‍^{y}	4	–	2	–	3	.611	9	–	11	–	4	.458
Northern Arizona ‍‍‍	4	–	3	–	2	.556	8	–	8	–	3	.500
Portland St. ‍‍‍	3	–	6	–	0	.333	4	–	15	–	0	.211
Idaho St. ‍‍‍	2	–	5	–	2	.333	5	–	12	–	2	.316
Weber St. ‍‍‍	1	–	3	–	5	.389	2	–	10	–	5	.265
Idaho ‍‍‍	1	–	6	–	2	.222	2	–	14	–	3	.184
Southern Utah ‍‍‍	1	–	6	–	2	.222	1	–	15	–	2	.111
† – Conference champion ‡ – 2019 Big Sky Tournament champion y – Invited to the NCAA tournament As of December 9, 2019; Rankings from United Soccer Coaches Poll; Source:The Big Sky Conference

2019 Big South Conference women's soccer standings
	Conf.						Overall
Team	W		L		T	PCT	W		L		T	PCT
High Point ‍†‍‍	8	–	0	–	2	.900	10	–	7	–	2	.579
Campbell ‍‍‍	8	–	1	–	1	.850	13	–	4	–	2	.737
Radford ‍‍‡‍^{y}	7	–	3	–	0	.700	16	–	6	–	0	.727
Gardner-Webb ‍‍‍	7	–	3	–	0	.700	10	–	11	–	1	.477
Winthrop ‍‍‍	6	–	3	–	1	.650	8	–	7	–	1	.531
Longwood ‍‍‍	4	–	4	–	2	.500	6	–	9	–	2	.412
Presbyterian ‍‍‍	4	–	6	–	0	.400	5	–	13	–	0	.278
Charleston Southern ‍‍‍	3	–	5	–	2	.400	7	–	10	–	2	.421
UNC Asheville ‍‍‍	3	–	7	–	0	.300	5	–	13	–	0	.278
USC Upstate ‍‍‍	0	–	9	–	1	.050	2	–	11	–	3	.219
Hampton ‍‍‍	0	–	9	–	1	.050	1	–	15	–	1	.088
† – Conference champion ‡ – 2019 Big South Tournament champion y – Invited to the NCAA tournament As of December 9, 2019; Rankings from United Soccer Coaches Poll; Source:Big South Conference

2019 Big Ten Conference women's soccer standings
	Conf.						Overall
Team	W		L		T	PCT	W		L		T	PCT
No. 10 Wisconsin ‍†‍‍^{y}	10	–	0	–	1	.955	16	–	4	–	2	.773
Rutgers ‍‍‍^{y}	8	–	2	–	1	.773	15	–	4	–	2	.762
No. 15 Michigan ‍‍‍^{y}	8	–	2	–	1	.773	17	–	6	–	1	.729
No. 13 Penn St ‍‍‡‍^{y}	8	–	3	–	0	.727	17	–	7	–	1	.700
Iowa ‍‍‍^{y}	7	–	3	–	1	.682	15	–	5	–	1	.738
Maryland ‍‍‍	5	–	5	–	1	.500	9	–	8	–	3	.525
Indiana ‍‍‍	4	–	5	–	2	.455	8	–	9	–	2	.474
Purdue ‍‍‍	3	–	6	–	2	.364	8	–	9	–	3	.475
Northwestern ‍‍‍	3	–	6	–	2	.364	5	–	10	–	3	.361
Nebraska ‍‍‍	3	–	6	–	2	.364	4	–	10	–	4	.333
Illinois ‍‍‍	3	–	7	–	1	.318	9	–	8	–	1	.528
Ohio St ‍‍‍	2	–	6	–	3	.318	4	–	10	–	4	.333
Minnesota ‍‍‍	2	–	7	–	2	.273	3	–	12	–	4	.263
Michigan St ‍‍‍	1	–	9	–	1	.136	8	–	10	–	1	.447
† – Conference champion ‡ – 2019 Big Ten Tournament champion y – Invited to the NCAA tournament As of December 10, 2019; Rankings from United Soccer Coaches Poll; Source:The Big Ten Conference

2019 Big West Conference women's soccer standings
	Conf.						Overall
Team	W		L		T	PCT	W		L		T	PCT
Cal State Fullerton ‍†‍‡‍^{y}	5	–	0	–	3	.813	14	–	3	–	4	.762
UC Santa Barbara ‍‍‍	4	–	1	–	3	.688	8	–	5	–	6	.579
Hawaii ‍‍‍	4	–	1	–	3	.688	6	–	8	–	4	.444
Cal State Northridge ‍‍‍	5	–	3	–	0	.625	12	–	7	–	3	.614
Cal Poly ‍‍‍	3	–	3	–	2	.500	6	–	10	–	3	.395
UC Irvine ‍‍‍	3	–	3	–	2	.500	4	–	12	–	2	.278
Long Beach St ‍‍‍	2	–	5	–	1	.313	4	–	12	–	1	.265
UC Davis ‍‍‍	2	–	6	–	0	.250	7	–	11	–	0	.389
UC Riverside ‍‍‍	1	–	7	–	0	.125	3	–	14	–	1	.194
† – Conference champion ‡ – 2019 Big West Tournament champion y – Invited to the NCAA tournament As of December 9, 2019; Rankings from United Soccer Coaches Poll; Source:The Big West Conference

2019 Big 12 Conference women's soccer standings
	Conf.						Overall
Team	W		L		T	PCT	W		L		T	PCT
No. 19 Oklahoma State ‍†‍‍^{y}	7	–	1	–	1	.833	16	–	2	–	3	.833
No. 20 Texas Tech ‍‍‍^{y}	6	–	1	–	2	.778	15	–	3	–	3	.786
Texas ‍‍‍^{y}	6	–	3	–	0	.667	11	–	8	–	1	.575
West Virginia ‍‍‍^{y}	5	–	3	–	1	.611	11	–	7	–	2	.600
No. 11 Kansas ‍‍‡‍^{y}	4	–	2	–	3	.611	16	–	4	–	3	.761
TCU ‍‍‍^{y}	4	–	3	–	2	.556	11	–	8	–	3	.568
Baylor ‍‍‍	4	–	5	–	0	.444	8	–	8	–	3	.500
Oklahoma ‍‍‍	3	–	5	–	1	.389	8	–	9	–	3	.475
Kansas State ‍‍‍	1	–	8	–	0	.111	3	–	13	–	2	.222
Iowa State ‍‍‍	0	–	9	–	0	.000	3	–	15	–	0	.167
† – Conference champion ‡ – Tournament champion y – Invited to the NCAA tournament Rankings from United Soccer Coaches

2019 Colonial Athletic Association women's soccer standings
	Conf.						Overall
Team	W		L		T	PCT	W		L		T	PCT
Hofstra ‍†‍‡‍^{y}	7	–	0	–	2	.889	16	–	4	–	2	.773
Delaware ‍‍‍	7	–	2	–	0	.778	12	–	7	–	0	.632
UNC Wilmington ‍‍‍	6	–	2	–	1	.722	10	–	6	–	1	.618
Northeastern ‍‍‍	5	–	3	–	1	.611	8	–	10	–	1	.447
Elon ‍‍‍	5	–	3	–	1	.611	12	–	6	–	2	.650
James Madison ‍‍‍	4	–	4	–	1	.500	9	–	12	–	1	.432
William & Mary ‍‍‍	3	–	5	–	1	.389	5	–	11	–	2	.333
Charleston ‍‍‍	2	–	7	–	0	.222	8	–	10	–	0	.444
Drexel ‍‍‍	1	–	7	–	1	.167	5	–	11	–	3	.342
Towson ‍‍‍	1	–	8	–	0	.111	4	–	13	–	1	.250
† – Conference champion ‡ – 2019 CAA Tournament champion y – Invited to the NCAA tournament As of December 9, 2019; Rankings from United Soccer Coaches Poll; Source:Colonial Athletic Association

2019 Conference USA women's soccer standings
	Conf.						Overall
Team	W		L		T	PCT	W		L		T	PCT
Florida Atlantic ‍†‍‍	8	–	1	–	1	.850	15	–	4	–	2	.762
North Texas ‍‍‡‍^{y}	7	–	2	–	1	.750	15	–	6	–	1	.705
Rice ‍‍‍	6	–	1	–	3	.750	10	–	6	–	3	.605
Charlotte ‍‍‍	7	–	3	–	0	.700	13	–	6	–	0	.684
Western Kentucky ‍‍‍	6	–	4	–	0	.600	10	–	7	–	1	.583
Louisiana Tech ‍‍‍	5	–	4	–	1	.550	13	–	4	–	3	.725
UTEP ‍‍‍	5	–	4	–	1	.550	10	–	7	–	3	.575
Middle Tennessee ‍‍‍	5	–	4	–	1	.550	8	–	10	–	1	.447
Old Dominion ‍‍‍	4	–	4	–	2	.500	10	–	4	–	4	.667
UTSA ‍‍‍	4	–	6	–	0	.400	8	–	8	–	1	.500
UAB ‍‍‍	2	–	5	–	3	.350	4	–	7	–	6	.412
Southern Miss ‍‍‍	2	–	7	–	1	.250	7	–	10	–	1	.417
Marshall ‍‍‍	2	–	8	–	0	.200	4	–	14	–	0	.222
FIU ‍‍‍	0	–	10	–	0	.000	0	–	2	–	15	.441
† – Conference champion ‡ – 2019 C-USA Tournament champion y – Invited to the NCAA tournament As of December 9, 2019; Rankings from United Soccer Coaches Poll; Source:Conference USA

2019 Horizon League women's soccer standings
	Conf.						Overall
Team	W		L		T	PCT	W		L		T	PCT
Milwaukee ‍†‍‡‍^{y}	8	–	0	–	1	.944	17	–	2	–	1	.875
UIC ‍‍‍	7	–	2	–	0	.778	12	–	6	–	1	.658
IUPUI ‍‍‍	6	–	3	–	0	.667	12	–	7	–	1	.625
Wright State ‍‍‍	5	–	4	–	0	.556	10	–	6	–	2	.611
Northern Kentucky ‍‍‍	5	–	4	–	0	.556	8	–	9	–	0	.471
Oakland ‍‍‍	4	–	3	–	2	.556	6	–	8	–	3	.441
Cleveland State ‍‍‍	4	–	4	–	1	.500	6	–	8	–	3	.441
Youngstown State ‍‍‍	4	–	4	–	1	.500	6	–	8	–	3	.441
Green Bay ‍‍‍	1	–	7	–	1	.167	7	–	10	–	1	.417
Detroit Mercy ‍‍‍	0	–	8	–	1	.056	2	–	13	–	2	.176
† – Conference champion ‡ – 2019 Horizon League Tournament champion y – Invited to the NCAA tournament As of December 9, 2019; Rankings from United Soccer Coaches Poll; Source:Horizon League

2019 Ivy League women's soccer standings
	Conf.						Overall
Team	W		L		T	PCT	W		L		T	PCT
No. 23 Brown ‍†‍‍^{y}	6	–	0	–	1	.929	14	–	2	–	3	.816
Harvard ‍‍‍	5	–	1	–	1	.786	12	–	3	–	1	.781
Yale ‍‍‍	4	–	2	–	1	.643	11	–	4	–	1	.719
Columbia ‍‍‍	3	–	1	–	3	.643	9	–	3	–	4	.688
Princeton ‍‍‍	3	–	3	–	1	.500	8	–	6	–	3	.559
Penn ‍‍‍	2	–	5	–	0	.286	8	–	7	–	1	.531
Dartmouth ‍‍‍	1	–	5	–	1	.214	10	–	6	–	1	.618
Cornell ‍‍‍	0	–	7	–	0	.000	4	–	10	–	1	.300
† – Conference champion y – Invited to the NCAA Tournament; As of December 11, 2019; Rankings from United Soccer Coaches Poll; Source:Ivy League

2019 Mid-American Conference women's soccer standings
	Conf.						Overall
Team	W		L		T	PCT	W		L		T	PCT
Bowling Green ‍†‍‡‍^{y}	10	–	1	–	0	.909	14	–	6	–	3	.674
Ball State ‍‍‍	8	–	2	–	0	.800	14	–	4	–	0	.778
Western Michigan ‍‍‍	6	–	4	–	1	.591	8	–	9	–	1	.472
Buffalo ‍‍‍	5	–	4	–	2	.545	5	–	4	–	2	.545
Akron ‍‍‍	5	–	4	–	2	.545	8	–	9	–	2	.474
Ohio ‍‍‍	5	–	5	–	1	.500	10	–	8	–	1	.553
Eastern Michigan ‍‍‍	5	–	6	–	0	.455	6	–	11	–	2	.368
Central Michigan ‍‍‍	4	–	5	–	2	.455	7	–	5	–	4	.563
Kent State ‍‍‍	4	–	5	–	2	.455	6	–	9	–	3	.417
Toledo ‍‍‍	4	–	7	–	0	.364	7	–	12	–	0	.368
Miami (OH) ‍‍‍	3	–	6	–	1	.350	4	–	12	–	1	.265
Northern Illinois ‍‍‍	0	–	10	–	1	.045	2	–	14	–	2	.167
† – Conference champion ‡ – 2019 MAC Tournament champion y – Invited to the NCAA Tournament; As of December 9, 2019; Rankings from United Soccer Coaches Poll; Source:Mid-American Conference

2019 MAAC women's soccer standings
	Conf.						Overall
Team	W		L		T	PCT	W		L		T	PCT
Monmouth ‍†‍‡‍^{y}	10	–	0	–	0	1.000	14	–	2	–	3	.816
Fairfield ‍‍‍	7	–	2	–	1	.750	11	–	6	–	3	.625
Rider ‍‍‍	5	–	3	–	2	.600	8	–	6	–	4	.556
Quinnipiac ‍‍‍	5	–	4	–	1	.550	10	–	8	–	1	.553
Marist ‍‍‍	5	–	4	–	1	.550	8	–	10	–	1	.447
Niagara ‍‍‍	4	–	5	–	1	.450	9	–	8	–	2	.526
Iona ‍‍‍	4	–	5	–	1	.450	7	–	11	–	2	.400
Manhattan ‍‍‍	3	–	5	–	2	.400	4	–	11	–	2	.294
Canisius ‍‍‍	2	–	6	–	2	.300	7	–	8	–	2	.471
Siena ‍‍‍	2	–	6	–	2	.300	4	–	11	–	4	.316
St. Peter's ‍‍‍	1	–	8	–	1	.150	3	–	13	–	1	.206
† – Conference champion ‡ – 2019 MAAC Tournament champion y – Invited to the NCAA tournament As of December 9, 2019; Rankings from United Soccer Coaches Poll; Source:MAAC

2019 Missouri Valley Conference women's soccer standings
	Conf.						Overall
Team	W		L		T	PCT	W		L		T	PCT
Loyola–Chicago ‍†‍‡‍^{y}	7	–	0	–	0	1.000	14	–	5	–	1	.725
Illinois State ‍‍‍	6	–	1	–	0	.857	14	–	6	–	0	.700
Missouri State ‍‍‍	4	–	2	–	1	.643	11	–	5	–	2	.667
Drake ‍‍‍	4	–	3	–	0	.571	8	–	10	–	1	.447
Valparaiso ‍‍‍	2	–	5	–	0	.286	2	–	15	–	1	.139
Evansville ‍‍‍	1	–	4	–	2	.286	2	–	12	–	3	.206
Indiana State ‍‍‍	1	–	5	–	1	.214	3	–	11	–	2	.250
UNI ‍‍‍	1	–	6	–	0	.143	5	–	11	–	0	.313
† – Conference champion ‡ – 2019 Missouri Valley Tournament champion y – Invited to the NCAA tournament As of December 9, 2019; Rankings from United Soccer Coaches Poll; Source:Missouri Valley Conference

2019 Mountain West Conference women's soccer standings
	Conf.						Overall
Team	W		L		T	PCT	W		L		T	PCT
Boise State ‍†‍‡‍^{y}	8	–	3	–	0	.727	18	–	5	–	0	.783
San Diego St ‍†‍‍	8	–	3	–	0	.727	10	–	9	–	1	.525
Colorado St ‍‍‍	7	–	3	–	1	.682	12	–	5	–	3	.675
New Mexico ‍‍‍	6	–	4	–	1	.591	11	–	8	–	1	.575
San Jose St ‍‍‍	5	–	4	–	2	.545	7	–	9	–	4	.450
Fresno State ‍‍‍	5	–	4	–	2	.545	9	–	7	–	4	.550
Colorado College ‍‍‍	5	–	6	–	0	.455	10	–	7	–	0	.588
Air Force ‍‍‍	5	–	6	–	0	.455	10	–	7	–	1	.583
Wyoming ‍‍‍	4	–	5	–	2	.455	7	–	7	–	5	.500
Utah State ‍‍‍	3	–	7	–	1	.318	8	–	10	–	1	.447
Nevada ‍‍‍	3	–	8	–	0	.273	4	–	14	–	0	.222
UNLV ‍‍‍	2	–	8	–	1	.227	6	–	13	–	1	.325
† – Conference champion ‡ – 2019 MW Tournament champion y – Invited to the NCAA tournament As of December 9, 2019; Rankings from United Soccer Coaches Poll; Source:Mountain West Conference

2019 Northeast Conference women's soccer standings
	Conf.						Overall
Team	W		L		T	PCT	W		L		T	PCT
Central Connecticut ‍†‍‡‍^{y}	8	–	1	–	1	.850	13	–	5	–	4	.682
Fairleigh Dickinson ‍‍‍	7	–	0	–	3	.850	9	–	6	–	6	.571
Bryant ‍‍‍	7	–	0	–	3	.850	9	–	4	–	4	.647
Sacred Heart ‍‍‍	6	–	3	–	1	.650	9	–	8	–	2	.526
Saint Francis (PA) ‍‍‍	6	–	4	–	0	.600	7	–	9	–	1	.441
Robert Morris ‍‍‍	4	–	5	–	1	.450	6	–	10	–	2	.389
Wagner ‍‍‍	3	–	4	–	3	.450	5	–	10	–	3	.361
LIU ‍‍‍	4	–	6	–	0	.400	5	–	12	–	1	.306
Mount St. Mary's ‍‍‍	2	–	7	–	1	.250	3	–	13	–	1	.206
Merrimack ‍‍‍	1	–	8	–	1	.150	3	–	14	–	1	.194
St. Francis Brooklyn ‍‍‍	0	–	10	–	0	.000	0	–	17	–	0	.000
† – Conference champion ‡ – 2019 NEC Tournament champion y – Invited to the NCAA Tournament; As of December 9, 2019; Rankings from United Soccer Coaches Poll; Source:Northeast Conference

2019 Ohio Valley Conference women's soccer standings
	Conf.						Overall
Team	W		L		T	PCT	W		L		T	PCT
SEMO ‍†‍‍	8	–	1	–	1	.850	11	–	5	–	0	.688
Murray State ‍‍‍	8	–	2	–	0	.800	11	–	8	–	0	.579
UT Martin ‍‍‍	6	–	2	–	2	.700	8	–	6	–	5	.553
SIUE ‍‍‍	5	–	2	–	3	.650	10	–	5	–	5	.625
Tennessee Tech ‍‍‍	4	–	3	–	3	.550	6	–	8	–	5	.447
Belmont ‍‍‡‍^{y}	4	–	4	–	2	.500	8	–	9	–	5	.477
Austin Peay ‍‍‍	3	–	5	–	2	.400	4	–	10	–	4	.333
EIU ‍‍‍	2	–	5	–	3	.350	4	–	10	–	4	.333
EKU ‍‍‍	2	–	6	–	2	.300	4	–	12	–	2	.278
Morehead St. ‍‍‍	2	–	6	–	2	.300	4	–	12	–	2	.278
Jacksonville St. ‍‍‍	1	–	9	–	0	.100	4	–	14	–	0	.222
† – Conference champion ‡ – 2019 OVC Tournament champion y – Invited to the NCAA tournament As of December 9, 2019; Rankings from United Soccer Coaches Poll; Source:Ohio Valley Conference

2019 Pac-12 Conference women's soccer standings
	Conf.						Overall
Team	W		L		T	PCT	W		L		T	PCT
No. 1 Stanford ‍†‍‍^{y}	11	–	0	–	0	1.000	24	–	1	–	0	.960
No. 3 UCLA ‍‍‍^{y}	8	–	3	–	0	.727	18	–	5	–	1	.771
No. 8 USC ‍‍‍^{y}	7	–	4	–	0	.636	17	–	5	–	1	.761
Washington ‍‍‍^{y}	7	–	4	–	0	.636	12	–	7	–	2	.619
Cal ‍‍‍^{y}	5	–	3	–	3	.591	13	–	5	–	3	.690
No. 4 Washington St ‍‍‍^{y}	5	–	5	–	1	.500	16	–	7	–	1	.688
Arizona ‍‍‍^{y}	5	–	5	–	1	.500	12	–	7	–	1	.625
Utah ‍‍‍^{y}	3	–	5	–	3	.409	8	–	9	–	4	.476
Oregon St ‍‍‍	3	–	6	–	2	.364	11	–	6	–	2	.632
Colorado ‍‍‍^{y}	3	–	6	–	2	.364	11	–	7	–	2	.600
Oregon ‍‍‍	1	–	8	–	2	.182	5	–	9	–	5	.395
Arizona St ‍‍‍	0	–	9	–	2	.091	6	–	11	–	3	.375
† – Conference champion y – Invited to the NCAA Tournament; As of December 11, 2019; Rankings from United Soccer Coaches Poll; Source:Pac 12

2019 Patriot League women's soccer standings
	Conf.						Overall
Team	W		L		T	PCT	W		L		T	PCT
Navy ‍†‍‡‍^{y}	6	–	1	–	2	.778	16	–	3	–	3	.795
Holy Cross ‍‍‍	3	–	1	–	5	.611	5	–	4	–	8	.529
Army ‍‍‍	4	–	3	–	2	.556	9	–	7	–	4	.550
Loyola (MD) ‍‍‍	3	–	2	–	3	.563	7	–	7	–	5	.500
Lafayette ‍‍‍	3	–	2	–	4	.556	7	–	5	–	5	.559
Colgate ‍‍‍	3	–	3	–	3	.500	5	–	8	–	4	.412
Bucknell ‍‍‍	3	–	4	–	2	.444	5	–	11	–	2	.333
Lehigh ‍‍‍	3	–	5	–	1	.389	5	–	8	–	5	.417
Boston U ‍‍‍	2	–	6	–	1	.278	5	–	12	–	2	.316
American ‍‍‍	1	–	4	–	4	.333	6	–	8	–	4	.444
† – Conference champion ‡ – 2019 Patriot League tournament champion y – Invited to the NCAA tournament As of December 9, 2019; Rankings from United Soccer Coaches Poll; Source:Patriot League

2019 SEC women's soccer standings
	Conf.						Overall
Team	W		L		T	PCT	W		L		T	PCT
East
No. 6 South Carolina ‍†‍‡‍^{y}	7	–	0	–	3	.850	19	–	2	–	3	.854
Vanderbilt ‍‍‍^{y}	6	–	3	–	1	.650	14	–	5	–	2	.714
Florida ‍‍‍^{y}	6	–	3	–	1	.650	11	–	9	–	1	.548
Georgia ‍‍‍	4	–	3	–	3	.550	8	–	7	–	4	.526
Tennessee ‍‍‍	3	–	5	–	2	.400	9	–	6	–	3	.583
Kentucky ‍‍‍	1	–	8	–	1	.150	6	–	10	–	3	.395
Missouri ‍‍‍	1	–	8	–	1	.150	7	–	10	–	1	.417
West
No. 12 Arkansas ‍†‍‍^{y}	8	–	1	–	1	.850	17	–	4	–	2	.783
No. 22 Texas A&M ‍‍‍^{y}	7	–	2	–	1	.750	14	–	5	–	3	.705
Alabama ‍‍‍	4	–	4	–	2	.500	10	–	7	–	3	.575
Ole Miss ‍‍‍	3	–	4	–	3	.450	10	–	7	–	3	.575
Auburn ‍‍‍	4	–	6	–	0	.400	7	–	10	–	2	.421
Mississippi St. ‍‍‍	3	–	4	–	3	.450	8	–	8	–	3	.500
LSU ‍‍‍	1	–	7	–	2	.200	3	–	12	–	3	.250
† – Conference champion ‡ – 2019 SEC Tournament champion y – Invited to the NCAA Tournament; As of December 11, 2019; Rankings from United Soccer Coaches Poll; Source:SEC

2019 Southern Conference women's soccer standings
	Conf.						Overall
Team	W		L		T	PCT	W		L		T	PCT
Samford ‍†‍‡‍^{y}	7	–	1	–	1	.833	13	–	4	–	5	.705
Furman ‍†‍‍	7	–	1	–	1	.833	14	–	6	–	1	.690
Mercer ‍‍‍	7	–	2	–	0	.778	16	–	4	–	0	.800
UNC Greensboro ‍‍‍	7	–	2	–	0	.778	10	–	8	–	2	.550
Western Carolina ‍‍‍	5	–	4	–	0	.556	11	–	8	–	0	.579
Chattanooga ‍‍‍	4	–	4	–	1	.500	9	–	6	–	4	.579
Wofford ‍‍‍	3	–	6	–	0	.333	7	–	12	–	0	.368
ETSU ‍‍‍	1	–	6	–	2	.222	5	–	11	–	4	.350
The Citadel ‍‍‍	1	–	8	–	0	.111	6	–	11	–	2	.368
VMI ‍‍‍	0	–	8	–	1	.056	1	–	16	–	2	.105
† – Conference champion ‡ – 2019 Southern Tournament champion y – Invited to the NCAA tournament As of December 9, 2019; Rankings from United Soccer Coaches Poll; Source:SoCon

2019 Southland Conference women's soccer standings
	Conf.						Overall
Team	W		L		T	PCT	W		L		T	PCT
Lamar ‍†‍‡‍^{y}	10	–	1	–	0	.909	16	–	7	–	0	.696
Abilene Christian ‍‍‍	8	–	2	–	1	.773	12	–	5	–	2	.684
Northwestern St ‍‍‍	8	–	2	–	1	.773	13	–	8	–	1	.614
Incarnate Word ‍‍‍	7	–	4	–	0	.636	8	–	10	–	1	.447
Texas A&M-CC ‍‍‍	6	–	4	–	1	.591	9	–	9	–	2	.500
McNeese St ‍‍‍	6	–	5	–	0	.545	11	–	9	–	0	.550
Sam Houston St ‍‍‍	5	–	5	–	1	.500	11	–	9	–	1	.548
Stephen F. Austin ‍‍‍	5	–	6	–	0	.455	7	–	11	–	1	.395
Cent. Arkansas ‍‍‍	4	–	7	–	0	.364	5	–	12	–	1	.306
SE Louisiana ‍‍‍	3	–	8	–	0	.273	4	–	13	–	1	.250
Houston Baptist ‍‍‍	2	–	9	–	0	.182	3	–	15	–	0	.167
Nicholls ‍‍‍	0	–	11	–	0	.000	3	–	14	–	1	.194
† – Conference champion ‡ – 2019 Southland Tournament champion y – Invited to the NCAA tournament As of December 9, 2019; Rankings from United Soccer Coaches Poll; Source:Southland Conference

2019 SWAC women's soccer standings
	Conf.						Overall
Team	W		L		T	PCT	W		L		T	PCT
Howard ‍†‍‍	9	–	1	–	0	.900	13	–	3	–	0	.813
Prairie View A&M ‍†‍‡‍^{y}	9	–	1	–	0	.900	11	–	7	–	0	.611
Jackson State ‍‍‍	7	–	3	–	0	.700	7	–	11	–	0	.389
Alabama A&M ‍‍‍	7	–	3	–	0	.700	9	–	8	–	1	.528
Grambling State ‍‍‍	6	–	4	–	0	.600	10	–	10	–	1	.500
Texas Southern ‍‍‍	5	–	4	–	1	.550	6	–	10	–	1	.382
Alabama State ‍‍‍	4	–	6	–	0	.400	5	–	14	–	0	.263
Southern ‍‍‍	3	–	6	–	1	.350	4	–	11	–	1	.281
UAPB ‍‍‍	3	–	7	–	0	.300	5	–	12	–	0	.294
Alcorn State ‍‍‍	1	–	9	–	0	.100	1	–	15	–	0	.063
Mississippi Valley St ‍‍‍	0	–	10	–	0	.000	1	–	14	–	1	.094
† – Conference champion ‡ – 2019 SWAC Tournament champion y – Invited to the NCAA Tournament; As of November 15, 2019; Rankings from United Soccer Coaches Poll; Source:SWAC

2019 Sun Belt Conference women's soccer standings
	Conf.						Overall
Team	W		L		T	PCT	W		L		T	PCT
South Alabama ‍†‍‡‍^{y}	8	–	1	–	1	.850	16	–	4	–	2	.773
Troy ‍‍‍	7	–	1	–	2	.800	12	–	3	–	4	.737
Arkansas State ‍‍‍	5	–	2	–	3	.650	10	–	5	–	4	.632
Coastal Carolina ‍‍‍	5	–	4	–	1	.550	7	–	9	–	2	.444
Georgia State ‍‍‍	5	–	4	–	1	.550	9	–	9	–	2	.500
Texas State ‍‍‍	5	–	4	–	1	.550	9	–	7	–	3	.553
Louisiana ‍‍‍	4	–	4	–	2	.500	9	–	8	–	3	.525
Georgia Southern ‍‍‍	3	–	6	–	1	.350	6	–	11	–	1	.361
Little Rock ‍‍‍	2	–	4	–	4	.400	5	–	8	–	6	.421
Appalachian State ‍‍‍	2	–	6	–	2	.300	5	–	10	–	3	.361
UL Monroe ‍‍‍	0	–	10	–	0	.000	3	–	13	–	2	.222
† – Conference champion ‡ – 2019 Sun Belt Tournament champion y – Invited to the NCAA tournament As of December 9, 2019; Rankings from United Soccer Coaches Poll; Source:Sun Belt

2019 Summit League women's soccer standings
	Conf.						Overall
Team	W		L		T	PCT	W		L		T	PCT
Denver ‍†‍‍	7	–	0	–	1	.938	12	–	4	–	4	.700
South Dakota St ‍‍‡‍^{y}	6	–	1	–	1	.813	15	–	5	–	2	.727
Oral Roberts ‍‍‍	3	–	2	–	3	.563	6	–	9	–	4	.421
North Dakota ‍‍‍	4	–	4	–	0	.500	10	–	8	–	1	.553
North Dakota St ‍‍‍	3	–	3	–	2	.500	8	–	7	–	3	.528
South Dakota ‍‍‍	3	–	3	–	2	.500	8	–	9	–	2	.474
Omaha ‍‍‍	2	–	5	–	1	.313	5	–	11	–	2	.333
Western Illinois ‍‍‍	2	–	6	–	0	.250	6	–	11	–	1	.361
Purdue Fort Wayne ‍‍‍	0	–	6	–	2	.125	4	–	10	–	4	.333
† – Conference champion ‡ – 2019 Summit League Tournament champion y – Invited to the NCAA tournament As of December 9, 2019; Rankings from United Soccer Coaches Poll; Source:Summit League

2019 West Coast Conference women's soccer standings
	Conf.						Overall
Team	W		L		T	PCT	W		L		T	PCT
No. 5 BYU ‍†‍‍^{y}	8	–	0	–	1	.944	21	–	1	–	1	.935
No. 14 Santa Clara ‍‍‍^{y}	7	–	0	–	2	.889	15	–	6	–	2	.696
Pepperdine ‍‍‍^{y}	7	–	2	–	0	.778	11	–	6	–	3	.625
Gonzaga ‍‍‍	5	–	3	–	1	.611	12	–	6	–	1	.658
San Diego ‍‍‍	4	–	5	–	0	.444	8	–	9	–	1	.472
San Francisco ‍‍‍	3	–	5	–	1	.389	10	–	8	–	2	.550
Loyola Marymount ‍‍‍	3	–	5	–	1	.389	4	–	12	–	3	.289
Portland ‍‍‍	2	–	4	–	3	.389	6	–	6	–	5	.500
Saint Mary's ‍‍‍	1	–	7	–	1	.167	7	–	11	–	1	.395
Pacific ‍‍‍	0	–	9	–	0	.000	3	–	16	–	0	.158
† – Conference champion y – Invited to the NCAA Tournament; As of December 11, 2019; Rankings from United Soccer Coaches Poll; Source:West Coast Conference

2019 WAC women's soccer standings
	Conf.						Overall
Team	W		L		T	PCT	W		L		T	PCT
Seattle ‍†‍‡‍^{y}	6	–	1	–	1	.813	12	–	8	–	2	.591
California Baptist ‍‍‍	6	–	2	–	0	.750	13	–	5	–	1	.711
Utah Valley ‍‍‍	5	–	3	–	0	.625	11	–	9	–	1	.548
Kansas City ‍‍‍	4	–	2	–	2	.625	13	–	4	–	4	.714
CSU Bakersfield ‍‍‍	4	–	4	–	0	.500	9	–	9	–	2	.500
UTRGV ‍‍‍	3	–	4	–	1	.438	9	–	8	–	3	.525
New Mexico State ‍‍‍	3	–	5	–	0	.375	4	–	12	–	2	.278
Grand Canyon ‍‍‍	3	–	5	–	0	.375	4	–	14	–	1	.237
Chicago State ‍‍‍	0	–	8	–	0	.000	0	–	19	–	0	.000
† – Conference champion ‡ – 2019 WAC Tournament champion y – Invited to the NCAA tournament As of December 9, 2019; Rankings from United Soccer Coaches Poll; Source:WAC

=== Conference winners and tournaments ===
Conference	Regular Season Champion(s)	Tournament Winner	Conference Tournament	Tournament Dates	Tournament Venue (City)
ACC	North Carolina		2019 Tournament	November 3–10	Quarterfinals: Campus sites, hosted by higher seed Semifinals and final: Sahlen's Stadium • Cary, North Carolina
America East	Albany & Stony Brook (Note: Top seed in conference tournament.)	Stony Brook	2019 Tournament	November 3–10	Campus sites, hosted by higher seed
American	Memphis	South Florida	2019 Tournament	November 3–10	Quarterfinals: Campus sites, hosted by higher seed Semifinals and final: Sahlen's Stadium • Cary, North Carolina
ASUN	Florida Gulf Coast & Lipscomb	Lipscomb	2019 Tournament	November 1–9	Quarterfinals and semifinals: Campus sites, hosted by top two seeds Final: Hosted by top remaining seed
Atlantic 10	Saint Louis		2019 Tournament	November 2–10	Quarterfinals: Campus sites, hosted by higher seed Semifinals and final: Hermann Stadium • St. Louis, Missouri
Big 12	Oklahoma State	Kansas	2019 Tournament	November 3–10	Swope Soccer Village • Kansas City, Missouri
Big East	Xavier		2019 Tournament	November 3–10	Quarterfinals: Campus sites, hosted by higher seed Semifinals and final: Morrison Stadium • Omaha, Nebraska
Big Sky	Montana	Northern Colorado	2019 Tournament	November 6–10	Jackson Stadium • Greeley, Colorado
Big South	High Point	Radford	2019 Tournament	November 1–10	Quarterfinals: Campus sites, hosted by higher seed Semifinals and final: Sportsplex at Matthews • Matthews, North Carolina
Big Ten	Wisconsin	Penn State	2019 Tournament	November 3–10	Quarterfinals: Campus sites, hosted by higher seed Semifinals and final: Yurcak Field • Piscataway, New Jersey
Big West	Cal State Fullerton		2019 Tournament	November 7–10	Hosted by regular-season champion
CAA	Hofstra		2019 Tournament	November 1–9	Quarterfinals and semifinals: Campus sites, hosted by top two seeds Final: Hosted by top remaining seed
C-USA	Florida Atlantic	North Texas	2019 Tournament	November 6–10	UNT Soccer and Track & Field Stadium • Denton, Texas
Horizon	Milwaukee		2019 Tournament	November 4–9	Quarterfinals: Campus sites, hosted by #3 and #4 seeds Semifinals and final: Hosted by regular-season champion
Ivy	Brown	No Tournament			
MAAC	Monmouth		2019 Tournament	November 3–10	Campus sites, hosted by higher seed
MAC	Bowling Green		2019 Tournament	November 3–10	Quarterfinals: Campus sites, hosted by higher seed Semifinals and final: Hosted by top remaining seed
Missouri Valley	Loyola–Chicago		2019 Tournament	November 3–10	Betty and Bobby Allison South Stadium • Springfield, Missouri
Mountain West	Boise State & San Diego State	Boise State	2019 Tournament	November 5–9	Boas Tennis and Soccer Complex • Boise, Idaho
Northeast	Central Connecticut		2019 Tournament	November 8–10	Campus sites, hosted by higher seed
Ohio Valley	Southeast Missouri	Belmont	2019 Tournament	November 1–10	First round and quarterfinals: Campus sites, hosted by #3 and #4 seeds Semifinals and final: Hosted by regular-season champion
Pac-12	Stanford	No Tournament			
Patriot	Navy		2019 Tournament	November 5–10	Quarterfinals: Campus sites, hosted by #3 and #4 seeds Semifinals and final: Hosted by regular-season champion
SEC	South Carolina (East)	South Carolina	2019 Tournament	November 3–10	Orange Beach Sportsplex • Orange Beach, Alabama
SEC	Arkansas (West)	South Carolina	2019 Tournament	November 3–10	Orange Beach Sportsplex • Orange Beach, Alabama
SoCon	Furman & Samford	Samford	2019 Tournament	November 8–10	UNCG Soccer Stadium • Greensboro, North Carolina
Southland	Lamar		2019 Tournament	November 8–10	Bill Stephens Track/Soccer Complex • Conway, Arkansas
The Summit	Denver	South Dakota State	2019 Tournament	November 7–9	Fishback Soccer Park • Brookings, South Dakota
Sun Belt	South Alabama		2019 Tournament	November 6–10	Foley Sports Tourism Complex • Foley, Alabama
SWAC	Howard & Prairie View A&M	Prairie View A&M	2019 Tournament	November 7–10	Prairie View A&M Soccer Field • Prairie View, Texas
WCC	BYU	No Tournament			
WAC	Seattle		2019 Tournament	November 6–10	Championship Field • Seattle, Washington

== Postseason ==
=== Final rankings ===
Rank	United Soccer	TopDrawerSoccer.com	Soccer America
1	Stanford	Stanford	Stanford
2	North Carolina	North Carolina	North Carolina
3	UCLA	UCLA	Virginia
4	Washington State	Washington State	BYU
5	BYU	Florida State	South Carolina
6	South Carolina	USC	Arkansas
7	Florida State	BYU	UCLA
8	USC	South Carolina	Florida State
9	Virginia	Virginia	Kansas
10	Wisconsin	Arkansas	Penn State
11	Kansas	Brown	Xavier
12	Arkansas	South Florida	South Florida
13	Penn State	Oklahoma State	Memphis
14	Santa Clara	Texas A&M	Oklahoma State
15	Michigan	Kansas	Rutgers
16	South Florida	Wisconsin	USC
17	NC State	Duke	Texas Tech
18	Duke	Clemson	Texas A&M
19	Oklahoma State	Xavier	Georgetown
20	Texas Tech	Washington	Wisconsin
21	Memphis	Texas Tech	Brown
22	Texas A&M	Santa Clara	Santa Clara
23	Brown	Arizona	Vanderbilt
24	Xavier	NC State	Duke
25	Louisville	Memphis	Michigan

== Award winners ==
=== All-America teams ===
2019 United Soccer Coaches All-America Teams
First Team	Second Team	Third Team
Jordyn Bloomer, GK, Wisconsin; Malia Berkely, DF, Florida State; Grace Fisk, DF, South Carolina; Emily Fox, DF, North Carolina; Naomi Girma, DF, Stanford; Stasia Mallin, DF, Memphis; Mikayla Colohan, MF, BYU; Jessie Fleming, MF, UCLA; Catarina Macario, MF, Stanford; Brianna Pinto, MF, North Carolina; Amirah Ali, FW, Rutgers; Kirsten Davis, FW, Texas Tech; Elise Flake, FW, BYU; Tara McKeown, FW, USC; Alessia Russo, FW, North Carolina; Ally Watt, FW, Texas A&M	Angelina Anderson, GK, California; Amanda McGlynn, GK, Virginia Tech; Camryn Biegalski, DF, Wisconsin; Sydney Cummings, DF, Brown; Kaleigh Riehl, DF, Penn State; Kim Rodriguez, DF, Oklahoma State; Deyna Castellanos, MF, Florida State; Aerial Chavarin, MF, Yale; Emina Ekic, MF, Louisville; Roma McLaughlin, MF, Central Connecticut; Lucy Porter, MF, Hofstra; Sarah Stratigakis, MF, Michigan; Madison Haley, FW, Stanford; Clarissa Larisey, FW, Memphis; Dani Rhodes, FW, Wisconsin; Raimee Sherle, FW, Boise State; Evelyne Viens, FW, South Florida	Mikayla Krzeczowski, GK, South Carolina; Maycee Bell, DF, North Carolina; Cassie Hiatt, DF, Texas Tech; Alyssa Jefferson, DF, BYU; Kiki Pickett, DF, Stanford; Haley VanFossen, DF, Arkansas; Samantha Dewey, MF, Xavier; Paula Germino-Watnick, MF, Georgetown; Julia Grosso, MF, Texas; Tziarra King, MF, NC State; Taylor Kornieck, MF, Colorado; Atlanta Primus, MF, Cal State Fullerton; Sabrina Byran, FW, Hofstra; Katie McClure, FW, Kansas; Meghan McCool, FW, Virginia; Anna Podojil, FW, Arkansas; Evdokia Popadinova, FW, Florida Gulf Coast; Morgan Weaver, FW, Washington State

=== Major player of the year awards ===
- Hermann Trophy:
- TopDrawerSoccer.com National Player of the Year Award:

=== Other major awards ===
- United Soccer Coaches College Coach of the Year:
- Bill Jeffrey Award:
- Glenn Myernick Award:
- Jerry Yeagley Award:
- Mike Berticelli Award:
- NCAA Tournament MVP:

== See also ==
- College soccer
- List of NCAA Division I women's soccer programs
- 2019 in American soccer
- 2019 NCAA Division I Women's Soccer Tournament
- 2019 NCAA Division I men's soccer season
