= 2019 Northeast Conference women's soccer tournament =

2019 Soccer Tournament

- Classification: Division I
- Teams: 4
- Matches: 3
- Attendance: 1,332
- Site: Central Connecticut Soccer Field; New Britain, Connecticut
- Champions: Central Connecticut (10th title)
- Winning coach: Mick D’Arcy (8th title)
- MVP: Yo Tachibana (Central Connecticut)
- Broadcast: None

2019 Northeast Conference women's soccer standings
	Conf.						Overall
Team	W		L		T	PCT	W		L		T	PCT
Central Connecticut ‍†‍‡‍^{y}	8	–	1	–	1	.850	13	–	5	–	4	.682
Fairleigh Dickinson ‍‍‍	7	–	0	–	3	.850	9	–	6	–	6	.571
Bryant ‍‍‍	7	–	0	–	3	.850	9	–	4	–	4	.647
Sacred Heart ‍‍‍	6	–	3	–	1	.650	9	–	8	–	2	.526
Saint Francis (PA) ‍‍‍	6	–	4	–	0	.600	7	–	9	–	1	.441
Robert Morris ‍‍‍	4	–	5	–	1	.450	6	–	10	–	2	.389
Wagner ‍‍‍	3	–	4	–	3	.450	5	–	10	–	3	.361
LIU ‍‍‍	4	–	6	–	0	.400	5	–	12	–	1	.306
Mount St. Mary's ‍‍‍	2	–	7	–	1	.250	3	–	13	–	1	.206
Merrimack ‍‍‍	1	–	8	–	1	.150	3	–	14	–	1	.194
St. Francis Brooklyn ‍‍‍	0	–	10	–	0	.000	0	–	17	–	0	.000
† – Conference champion ‡ – 2019 NEC Tournament champion y – Invited to the NCAA Tournament; As of December 9, 2019; Rankings from United Soccer Coaches Poll; Source:Northeast Conference

The 2019 Northeast Conference women's soccer tournament was the postseason women's soccer tournament for the Northeast Conference held on November 8 and 10, 2019. The three-match tournament took place at Central Connecticut Soccer Field in New Britain, Connecticut, home of the regular season champions and tournament #1 seed Central Connecticut State Blue Devils. The four-team single-elimination tournament consisted of two rounds based on seeding from regular season conference play. The defending champions were the Central Connecticut State Blue Devils who successfully defended their title, defeating the Fairleigh Dickinson Knights 1–0 in the final. This was the tenth Northeast Conference tournament title for the Central Connecticut women's soccer program, eight of which have come under the direction of head coach Mick D'Arcy.

== Bracket ==
Semifinals; Friday, November 8
1	Central Connecticut	3
4	Sacred Heart	1
2	Fairleigh Dickinson	2
3	Bryant	0

Final; Sunday, November 10
1	Central Connecticut	1
2	Fairleigh Dickinson	0

== Schedule ==
=== Semifinals ===
November 8, 2019	#1 Central Connecticut	3–1	#4 Sacred Heart	New Britain, Connecticut
1:00 p.m. EST	Erica Bardes 23', 59'; Emily Hogan 56'	Report	43' Meadow Mancini; (yellow card) 69' Jill Klem	Stadium: Central Connecticut Soccer Field; Attendance: 879; Referee: Magda Zwierzchowski; Assistant referees: Pete Mandell; Kara Lange

November 8, 2019	#2 Fairleigh Dickinson	2–0	#3 Bryant	New Britain, Connecticut
4:00 p.m. EST	Lea Egner 35', (yellow card) 49'; Paula Ruess 62'; Maja Skansberg (yellow card) 64'; Madelyn Robbins (yellow card) 83'	Report		Stadium: Central Connecticut Soccer Field; Attendance: 453; Referee: Mike DeFelice; Assistant referees: Leah Hayes; Kenneth Heller

=== Final ===
November 10, 2019	#1 Central Connecticut	1–0	#2 Fairleigh Dickinson	New Britain, Connecticut
2:00 p.m. EST	Roma McLaughlin 17', (yellow card) 82'	Report		Stadium: Central Connecticut Soccer Field; Referee: Noel Cotterell; Assistant referees: Jordan Cavaco; Alex Casella

== Statistics ==
=== Goalscorers ===
2 Goals

- Emily Bardes (Central Connecticut)

1 Goal

- Lea Egner (Fairleigh Dickinson)
- Emily Hogan (Central Connecticut)
- Meadow Mancini (Sacred Heart)
- Roma McLaughlin (Central Connecticut)
- Paula Ruess (Fairleigh Dickinson)

== All-Tournament team ==
Player	Team
**Yo Tachibana**	Central Connecticut
Allyson O'Rourke	Central Connecticut
Taylor Smith	Central Connecticut
Brianna Williams	Central Connecticut
Amanda Fitzgerald	Fairleigh Dickinson
Maddie Robbins	Fairleigh Dickinson
Maja Skansberg	Fairleigh Dickinson
Marissa Grasso	Bryant
Jamie Irwin	Bryant
Elyssa Kipperman	Sacred Heart
Kathryn White	Sacred Heart

MVP in bold

== See also ==
- Northeast Conference
- 2019 NCAA Division I women's soccer season
- 2019 NCAA Division I Women's Soccer Tournament
