= 2019 America East men's soccer tournament =

- Classification: Division I
- Teams: 6
- Matches: 5
- Quarterfinals site: Higher seeds
- Semifinals site: Higher seeds
- Finals site: Wildcat Stadium; Durham, New Hampshire
- Champions: New Hampshire (2nd title)
- Winning coach: Marc Hubbard (2nd title)
- MVP: Josh Bauer (New Hampshire)
- Broadcast: AETV, ESPN+

2019 America East Conference men's soccer standings
	Conf.					Overall
Team	W		L		T	W		L		T
No. 22 New Hampshire ‡	5	–	1	–	1	15	–	2	–	3
Vermont	5	–	1	–	1	11	–	6	–	1
Hartford	4	–	2	–	1	12	–	5	–	4
Albany	4	–	3	–	0	9	–	7	–	1
UMass Lowell	3	–	4	–	0	9	–	8	–	1
Binghamton	3	–	4	–	0	6	–	9	–	3
UMBC	1	–	5	–	1	6	–	9	–	1
Stony Brook	1	–	6	–	0	4	–	11	–	1
‡ – 2019 Am. East Tournament champion + – Invited to the 2019 NCAA Tournament; As of 17 December 2019; Rankings from United Soccer Coaches

The 2019 America East men's soccer tournament was the 31st edition of the tournament. The tournament decided the America East Conference champion and guaranteed representative into the 2019 NCAA Division I men's soccer tournament. The tournament began on November 9 and concluded on November 16.

Defending champion, New Hampshire, was the number one seed coming into the tournament. Both New Hampshire and Vermont were statistically tied for first place in the conference. New Hampshire broke the tie by defeating Hartford twice, while Vermont split their games with Hartford. New Hampshire was seeking a consecutive tournament win since UMBC 2013–2015 seasons. In the final round of the tournament, New Hampshire played #3 seed Hartford, and the first and only goal of the game was kicked in by New Hampshire 3:27 into the game. This was New Hampshire's second America East conference title in school history.

New Hampshire was the conference's lone bid into the NCAA Tournament. They hosted Fairleigh-Dickinson in the first round, defeating Fairleigh-Dickinson 1–0 at home. They then traveled to 10-seed #13 Virginia Tech where they fell 1–4. This was New Hampshire's fourth appearance in NCAA Men's Soccer Tournament. New Hampshire finished the season nationally ranked 22nd by the United Soccer Coaches.

== Seeds ==
Seed	School	Conference	Tiebreaker
1	New Hampshire	5–1–1	UNH 1–1 vs. UVM, won both games against #3 Hartford
2	Vermont	5–1–1	UVM 1–1 vs. UNH, split games against #3 Hartford
3	Hartford	4–2–1	
4	Albany	4–3	
5	UMass-Lowell	3–4	
6	Binghamton	3–4	

== Bracket ==
First round Nov. 9
3	Hartford	2
6	Binghamton	0
4	Albany	0
5	UMass Lowell	1

Semifinals; Nov. 13
2	Vermont	2
3	Hartford	3 (OT)
1	New Hampshire	3
5	UMass Lowell	0

Final; Nov. 16
1	New Hampshire	1
3	Hartford	0

== Results ==
=== Quarterfinals ===
November 9
2:00 p.m. EST

No. 3 Hartford	2–0	No. 6 Binghamton
Aitor Elana 28'; Sergi Martinez 36'	Report

Al-Marzook Field at Alumni Stadium
West Hartford, Connecticut
Attendance: 289
Referee: Wilmer Melendez

November 9
3:00 p.m. EST

No. 4 Albany	0–1	No. 5 UMass Lowell
	Report	Alejandro Osorio 62'

Bob Ford Field
Albany, New York
Attendance: 106

=== Semifinals ===
November 13
4:00 p.m. EST

No. 2 Vermont	2–3 (OT)	No. 3 Hartford
Jon Arnar-Barodal 43'; Garrett Lillie 78'	Report	Jovante Etienne 19'; Sergi Martinez 40'; Nyrik Antoine 97'

Virtue Field
Burlington, Vermont
Attendance: 234
Referee: Adam Kilpatrick

November 13
4:00 p.m. EST

No. 1 New Hampshire	3–0	No. 5 UMass Lowell
Rory O'Driscoll 43'; Bilal Kamal 62'; Antonio Colacci 76'	Report

Wildcat Stadium
Durham, New Hampshire
Attendance: 758
Referee: Patrick Violette

=== Final ===
November 16
6:00 p.m. EST

No. 1 New Hampshire	1–0	No. 3 Hartford
Josh Bauer 3'	Report

Wildcat Stadium
Durham, New Hampshire
Attendance: 1,782
Referee: Jay Vallieres

== Awards and honors ==
- Tournament MVP: Josh Bauer, New Hampshire

All-Tournament team:

- Reide Conde, Albany
- Andrew McDonnell, Binghamton
- Alejandro Osorio, UMass-Lowell
- Patrik Gujic, UMass-Lowell
- Garrett Lillie, Vermont
- Jon Arnar-Barodal, Vermont

- Altor Elena, Hartford
- Sergi Martinez, Hartford
- Jimmy Slayton, Hartford
- Josh Bauer, New Hampshire
- Antonio Colacci, New Hampshire
- Rory O'Driscoll, New Hampshire
- Jonny Wolf, New Hampshire

== See also ==
- 2019 America East Conference Women's Soccer Tournament
