= 2019 SMU Mustangs women's soccer team =

Domestic soccer team

2019 SMU Mustangs women's soccer
- Conference: American Athletic Conference
- Record: 12–6–1 (4–5–0 American)
- Head coach: Chris Petrucelli (8th season)
- Assistant coaches: Nicole Nelson (8th season); Mat Cosgriff (6th season)
- Home stadium: Westcott Field

2019 American Athletic Conference women's soccer standings
	Conf.						Overall
Team	W		L		T	PCT	W		L		T	PCT
No. 21 Memphis ‍†‍‍^{y}	8	–	0	–	1	.944	17	–	3	–	1	.833
No. 16 USF ‍‍‡‍^{y}	7	–	2	–	0	.778	16	–	5	–	0	.762
UCF ‍‍‍	5	–	2	–	2	.667	11	–	4	–	4	.684
Cincinnati ‍‍‍	5	–	3	–	1	.611	7	–	9	–	3	.447
SMU ‍‍‍	4	–	5	–	0	.444	12	–	7	–	1	.625
Houston ‍‍‍	3	–	6	–	0	.333	6	–	14	–	0	.300
UConn ‍‍‍	2	–	5	–	2	.333	6	–	8	–	3	.441
Temple ‍‍‍	2	–	5	–	2	.333	5	–	9	–	5	.395
East Carolina ‍‍‍	2	–	5	–	2	.333	5	–	10	–	3	.361
Tulsa ‍‍‍	2	–	7	–	0	.222	8	–	11	–	0	.421
† – Conference champion ‡ – 2019 AAC Tournament champion y – Invited to the NCAA tournament As of December 11, 2019; Rankings from United Soccer Coaches Poll; Source:American Athletic Conference

The 2019 SMU Mustangs women's soccer team represented Southern Methodist University during the 2019 NCAA Division I women's soccer season. The regular season began on August 22 and concluded on October 31. It was the program's 26th season fielding a women's varsity soccer team, and their 7th season in the AAC. The 2019 season was Chris Petrucelli's eighth year as head coach for the program.

== Roster ==
As of October 9, 2019

Note: Flags indicate national team as defined under FIFA eligibility rules; some limited exceptions apply. Players may hold more than one non-FIFA nationality.

No.	Pos.	Nation	Player
0	GK	USA	Samantha Estrada
1	GK	USA	Tatum Sutherland
2	DF	CAN	Katharine Herron
3	MF	USA	Katia Novi
4	MF	USA	Hailey Bishop
5	MF	USA	Emily Cope
6	DF	USA	Ale Winn
7	DF	USA	Mary Meehan
8	DF	USA	Sophie Adler
9	FW	USA	Robyn Maurer
10	MF	CAN	Wayny Balata
11	FW	USA	Jewel Boland
12	FW	USA	Maddie Hansen

No.	Pos.	Nation	Player
13	MF	CAN	Isabelle Nashmi
14	FW	USA	Hannah Allred
15	FW	USA	Sadie Wintergalen
16	DF	USA	Danielle Escutia
17	FW	HUN	Brigitta Pulins
18	DF	USA	Brooke Golik
20	FW	USA	Allie Thornton
21	MF	USA	Celiana Torres
22	MF	USA	Katina Tsapos
23	DF	USA	Jessica Cooley
25	DF	USA	Serena Eboh
28	MF	USA	Courtney Sebazco
30	GK	USA	Kierstin Flint

== Schedule ==
Date Time, TV	Rank^{#}	Opponent^{#}	Result	Record	Site City, State
Non-conference regular season
August 22*; 7:00 p.m.		at Northwestern	W 1–0	1–0–0	Lanny and Sharon Martin Stadium; Evanston, IL
August 25*; 1:00 p.m.		at DePaul	W 2–1	2–0–0	Wish Field at Cacciatore Stadium; Chicago, IL
August 29*; 7:00 p.m.	No. 25	Texas Southern	W 9–0	3–0–0	Westcott Field; Dallas, TX
September 1*; 7:00 p.m.	No. 25	TCU	L 0–1	3–1–0	Westcott Field; Dallas, TX
September 6*; 5:30 p.m.		Northern Colorado	W 4–0	4–1–0	Westcott Field; Dallas, TX
September 12*; 7:00 p.m.		Rice	W 2–0	5–1–0	Westcott Field; Dallas, TX
September 15*; 1:00 p.m.		Long Beach State	W 1–0	6–1–0	Westcott Field; Dallas, TX
September 19*; 7:00 p.m.		at Oklahoma	W 3–2 ^{OT}	7–1–0	John Crain Field; Norman, OK
September 22*; 1:00 p.m.		at No. 25 Oklahoma State	T 2–2 ^{2OT}	7–1–1	Patterson Stadium; Stillwater, OK
American Athletic Conference regular season
October 3; 7:00 p.m.	No. 22	UCF	L 1–2	7–2–1 (0–1–0)	Westcott Field; Dallas, TX
October 6; 1:00 p.m.	No. 22	South Florida	L 0–1	7–3–1 (0–2–0)	Westcott Field; Dallas, TX
October 10; 6:00 p.m.		at Temple	W 1–0	8–3–1 (1–2–0)	Temple Sports Complex; Philadelphia, PA
October 13; 12:00 p.m.		at UConn	L 0–1	8–4–1 (1–3–0)	Dillon Stadium; Hartford, CT
October 17; 7:00 p.m.		Cincinnati	L 0–1	8–5–1 (1–4–0)	Westcott Field; Dallas, TX
October 20; 1:00 p.m.		East Carolina	W 4–0	9–5–1 (2–4–0)	Westcott Field; Dallas, TX
October 24; 7:00 p.m.		at Tulsa	W 3–0	10–5–1 (3–4–0)	Hurricane Soccer & Track Stadium; Tulsa, OK
October 27; 1:00 p.m.		at No. 11 Memphis	L 1–2	10–6–1 (3–5–0)	Billy J Murphy Track & Soccer Complex; Memphis, TN
October 31; 7:00 p.m.		Houston	W 3–2	11–6–1 (4–5–0)	Westcott Field; Dallas, TX
American Athletic Conference Tournament
November 3; 12:00 p.m.	(5)	at (4) Cincinnati; First round	W 1–0	12–6–1	Gettler Stadium; Cincinnati, OH
November 7; 7:00 p.m.	(5)	at (1) Memphis; Semifinals	L 2–4	12–7–1	Billy J Murphy Track & Soccer Complex; Memphis, TN
*Non-conference game. ^{#}Rankings from United Soccer Coaches. (#) Tournament seedings in parentheses. All times are in Central Time.

== Rankings ==
Ranking movements Legend: ██ Increase in ranking ██ Decrease in ranking — = Not ranked RV = Received votes
	Week																	
Poll	Pre	1	2	3	4	5	6	7	8	9	10	11	12	13	14	15	16	Final
United Soccer Coaches	RV	RV*	25	RV	RV	RV	23	22	RV	—	—	—						
TopDrawer Soccer	—	—	—	—	—	RV	RV	RV	—	—	—	—						
Soccer America	—	—*	—	—	—	—	—	—	—	—	—	—						

== See also ==
- 2019 SMU Mustangs men's soccer team
