= 2019 Big West Conference women's soccer tournament =

- Classification: Division I
- Teams: 4
- Matches: 3
- Attendance: 2,214
- Site: Titan Stadium; Fullerton, California
- Champions: Cal State Fullerton (6th title)
- Winning coach: Demian Brown (6th title)
- MVP: Atlanta Primus (Cal State Fullerton)
- Broadcast: BigWest.tv

2019 Big West Conference women's soccer standings
	Conf.						Overall
Team	W		L		T	PCT	W		L		T	PCT
Cal State Fullerton ‍†‍‡‍^{y}	5	–	0	–	3	.813	14	–	3	–	4	.762
UC Santa Barbara ‍‍‍	4	–	1	–	3	.688	8	–	5	–	6	.579
Hawaii ‍‍‍	4	–	1	–	3	.688	6	–	8	–	4	.444
Cal State Northridge ‍‍‍	5	–	3	–	0	.625	12	–	7	–	3	.614
Cal Poly ‍‍‍	3	–	3	–	2	.500	6	–	10	–	3	.395
UC Irvine ‍‍‍	3	–	3	–	2	.500	4	–	12	–	2	.278
Long Beach St ‍‍‍	2	–	5	–	1	.313	4	–	12	–	1	.265
UC Davis ‍‍‍	2	–	6	–	0	.250	7	–	11	–	0	.389
UC Riverside ‍‍‍	1	–	7	–	0	.125	3	–	14	–	1	.194
† – Conference champion ‡ – 2019 Big West Tournament champion y – Invited to the NCAA tournament As of December 9, 2019; Rankings from United Soccer Coaches Poll; Source:The Big West Conference

The 2019 Big West Conference women's soccer tournament was the postseason women's soccer tournament for the Big West Conference held on November 7 and 10, 2019. The three-match tournament took place at Titan Stadium in Fullerton, California. The four-team single-elimination tournament consisted of two rounds based on seeding from regular season conference play. The defending champions were the Long Beach State 49ers, but they failed to qualify for the 2019 tournament. The Cal State Fullerton Titans won the title by beating the Cal State Northridge Matadors 2–0 in the final. This was the eighth Big West tournament title for the Cal State Fullerton program and the sixth for head coach Demian Brown.

== Bracket ==
Semifinals; Thursday, November 7
1	Cal State Fullerton	3
4	Hawaii	0
2	Cal State Northridge	1^{OT}
3	UC Santa Barbara	0

Final; Sunday, November 10
1	Cal State Fullerton	4
2	Cal State Northridge	0

== Schedule ==
=== Semifinals ===
November 7, 2019	#2 Cal State Northridge	1–0 (a.e.t.)	#3 UC Santa Barbara	Fullerton, CA
5:00 p.m. PST	Alexis White 99'	Report		Stadium: Titan Stadium; Referee: Israel Fernandez; Assistant referees: Salma Perez; Kira Helmer; Fourth official: Jaclyn Reilman

November 7, 2019	#1 Cal State Fullerton	3–0	#4 Hawaii	Fullerton, CA
7:30 p.m. PST	Savannah Sloniger 8'; Maddie Bennett 15'; Haley Brown 50'	Report	(yellow card) 39' Elena Palacios	Stadium: Titan Stadium; Attendance: 913; Referee: Samantha Martinez; Assistant referees: Melissa Gonzalez; Jaclyn Reilman; Fourth official: Kristin Patterson

=== Final ===
November 10, 2019	#1 Cal State Fullerton	4–0	#2 Cal State Northridge	Fullerton, CA
5:00 p.m. PST	Megan Day 8'; Atlanta Primus 13'; Maddie Bennett 19'; Kaya Hawkinson 44'	Report	(yellow card) 80' Kassandra Matthews	Stadium: Titan Stadium; Attendance: 1,301; Referee: Bernard Hosu; Assistant referees: Andrea Reyes; Kristin Patterson; Fourth official: Wale Animashaun

== Statistics ==
=== Goalscorers ===
2 Goals

- Maddie Bennett (Cal State Fullerton)

1 Goal

- Haley Brown (Cal State Fullerton)
- Megan Day (Cal State Fullerton)
- Kaya Hawkinson (Cal State Fullerton)
- Atlanta Priums (Cal State Fullerton)
- Savannah Sloniger (Cal State Fullerton)
- Alexis White (Cal State Northridge)

== See also ==
- Big West Conference
- 2019 NCAA Division I women's soccer season
- 2019 NCAA Division I Women's Soccer Tournament
