= 2019 Big South Conference women's soccer tournament =

- Classification: Division I
- Teams: 8
- Matches: 7
- Attendance: 1,971
- Site: Sportsplex at Matthews; Matthews, North Carolina (Semifinals and Final)
- Champions: Radford (7th title)
- Winning coach: Ben Sohrabi (7th title)
- MVP: Nelia Perez (Radford)
- Broadcast: ESPN+

2019 Big South Conference women's soccer standings
	Conf.						Overall
Team	W		L		T	PCT	W		L		T	PCT
High Point ‍†‍‍	8	–	0	–	2	.900	10	–	7	–	2	.579
Campbell ‍‍‍	8	–	1	–	1	.850	13	–	4	–	2	.737
Radford ‍‍‡‍^{y}	7	–	3	–	0	.700	16	–	6	–	0	.727
Gardner-Webb ‍‍‍	7	–	3	–	0	.700	10	–	11	–	1	.477
Winthrop ‍‍‍	6	–	3	–	1	.650	8	–	7	–	1	.531
Longwood ‍‍‍	4	–	4	–	2	.500	6	–	9	–	2	.412
Presbyterian ‍‍‍	4	–	6	–	0	.400	5	–	13	–	0	.278
Charleston Southern ‍‍‍	3	–	5	–	2	.400	7	–	10	–	2	.421
UNC Asheville ‍‍‍	3	–	7	–	0	.300	5	–	13	–	0	.278
USC Upstate ‍‍‍	0	–	9	–	1	.050	2	–	11	–	3	.219
Hampton ‍‍‍	0	–	9	–	1	.050	1	–	15	–	1	.088
† – Conference champion ‡ – 2019 Big South Tournament champion y – Invited to the NCAA tournament As of December 9, 2019; Rankings from United Soccer Coaches Poll; Source:Big South Conference

The 2019 Big South Conference women's soccer tournament was the postseason women's soccer tournament for the Big South Conference held from November 1 through November 10, 2019. The quarterfinals of the tournament were held at campus sites, while the semifinals and final took place at Sportsplex at Matthews in Matthews, North Carolina. The eight-team single-elimination tournament consisted of three rounds based on seeding from regular season conference play. Radford were the defending champions, and successfully defended their championship with a 2–1 win over Gardner-Webb fin the final. The conference tournament title was the seventh for the Radford women's soccer program and the seventh for head coach Ben Sohrabi.

== Bracket ==
Quarterfinals; November 1–2
4	Gardner-Webb	2
5	Winthrop	1
1	High Point	1
8	Charleston Southern	0
2	Campbell	3^{(2OT)}
7	Presbyterian	2
3	Radford	3
6	Longwood	2

Semifinals; November 7
4	Gardner-Webb	1
1	High Point	0
2	Campbell	2
3	Radford	3^{(2OT)}

Final; November 10
4	Gardner-Webb	1
3	Radford	2

== Schedule ==
=== Quarterfinals ===
November 1, 2019	#4 Gardner-Webb	2–1	#5 Winthrop	Boiling Springs, NC
7:00 p.m. EST	Alisha Holcombe 6', (yellow card) 51'; Jada Newton 87'	Report	21' Allie Thomas; (yellow card) 27' Alexandra Perez	Stadium: Greene–Harbison Stadium; Attendance: 307; Referee: Danny Thornberry; Assistant referees: Ben Wooten; Josh Escobar; Fourth official: Doug Hartman

November 1, 2019	#1 High Point	1–0	#8 Charleston Southern	High Point, NC
7:00 p.m. EST	Kyle Levesque 63'	Report		Stadium: Vert Stadium; Referee: Eric Barnes; Assistant referees: Raymond Thomas; Justin Howard; Fourth official: Brandon Ingram

November 2, 2019	#2 Campbell	3–2 (a.e.t.)	#7 Presbyterian	Buies Creek, NC
7:00 p.m. EST	Rosie O'Neal 31'; Alexa Genas 67'; Elyssa Nowowieski 104'	Report	41' Morgan Hutchison; 55' Kori Lawrence	Stadium: Eakes Athletics Complex; Attendance: 279; Referee: Rick Rogers; Assistant referees: Robert Velbis; Aaron Hormuth; Fourth official: Hudson Owens

November 2, 2019	#3 Radford	3–2	#6 Longwood	Radford, VA
7:00 p.m.	Nelia Perez 24'; Brianna Oliver 28'; Gabi Paupst 62'	Report	62' Emilie Kupsov; (yellow card) 74', (goal) 75' Kiersten Yuhas	Stadium: Patrick D. Cupp Memorial Stadium; Attendance: 571; Referee: Jude Carr; Assistant referees: Scott Bowers; Ben Ellis; Fourth official: Phil Whisman

=== Semifinals ===
November 7, 2019	#1 High Point	0–1	#4 Gardner-Webb	Matthews, NC
4:00 p.m. EST	Kyle Levesque (yellow card) 48'; Team (yellow card) 48'; Mackenzie Mullins (yellow card) 64'; Shaylyn Owen (yellow card) 87'	Report	(yellow card) 11' Emily Jonas; 46' Stina Kleppe; (yellow card) 77' Maddie Turlington	Stadium: Sportsplex at Matthews; Attendance: 303; Referee: Tori Penso; Assistant referees: Kyle Johnston; Zach McWhorter

November 7, 2019	#2 Campbell	2–3 (a.e.t.)	#3 Radford	Matthews, NC
7:00 p.m.	Jessica Donald 43'; Alexa Genas 52'	Report	61' Alexeis Kirons; 81' Kayla Thomas; 102' Nelia Perez	Stadium: Sportsplex at Matthews; Referee: Ben Wooten; Assistant referees: John Rush; Joshua Escobar

=== Final ===
November 10, 2019	#3 Radford	2–1	#4 Gardner-Webb	Matthews, NC
2:00 p.m. EST	59' Lily McLane; 80' Nelia Perez	Report	19' Jada Newton	Stadium: Sportsplex at Matthews; Attendance: 511; Referee: Brandon Marion; Assistant referees: Kiah Haslett; Eric Barnes

== Statistics ==
=== Goalscorers ===
3 Goals

- Nelia Perez (Radford)

2 Goals

- Alexa Genas (Campbell)
- Jada Newton (Gardner-Webb)

1 Goal

- Jessica Donald (Campbell)
- Alisha Holcombe (Gardner-Webb)
- Morgan Hutchison (Presbyterian)
- Alexeis Kirons (Radford)
- Stina Kleppe (Gardner-Webb)
- Emilie Kupsov (Longwood)
- Kori Lawrence (Presbyterian)
- Kyle Levesque (High Point)
- Lily McLane (Radford)
- Elyssa Nowowieski (Campbell)
- Brianna Oliver (Radford)
- Rosie O'Neal (Campbell)
- Gabi Paupst (Radford)
- Allie Thomas (Winthrop)
- Kayla Thomas (Radford)
- Kiersten Yuhas (Longwood)

== All-Tournament team ==
Player	Team
**Nelia Perez**	Radford
Gabi Paupst	Radford
Kayla Thomas	Radford
Lily McLane	Radford
Jada Newton	Gardner-Webb
Katelyn Kellogg	Gardner-Webb
Stina Kleppe	Gardner-Webb
Shaylyn Owen	High Point
Allie Reagan	High Point
Alexa Genas	Campbell
Hanna Maansson	Campbell
Kori Lawrence	Presbyterian
Dylan Patterson	Winthrop
Jazmin Gonzalez	Charleston Southern
Kiersten Yuhas	Longwood

MVP in bold

== See also ==
- Big South Conference
- 2019 NCAA Division I women's soccer season
- 2019 NCAA Division I Women's Soccer Tournament
