= 2019 Missouri Valley Conference women's soccer tournament =

- Classification: Division I
- Teams: 6
- Matches: 5
- Attendance: 2,124
- Site: Allison South Stadium; Springfield, Missouri
- Champions: Loyola (2nd title)
- Winning coach: Barry Bimbi (2nd title)
- MVP: Sienna Cruz (Loyola)
- Broadcast: ESPN+

2019 Missouri Valley Conference women's soccer standings
| | Conf. | | | | | | Overall |
| Team | W | | L | | T | PCT | W | | L | | T | PCT |
|---|---|---|---|---|---|---|---|---|---|---|---|---|
| Loyola–Chicago ‍†‍‡‍^{y} | 7 | – | 0 | – | 0 | 1.000 | 14 | – | 5 | – | 1 | .725 |
| Illinois State ‍‍‍ | 6 | – | 1 | – | 0 | .857 | 14 | – | 6 | – | 0 | .700 |
| Missouri State ‍‍‍ | 4 | – | 2 | – | 1 | .643 | 11 | – | 5 | – | 2 | .667 |
| Drake ‍‍‍ | 4 | – | 3 | – | 0 | .571 | 8 | – | 10 | – | 1 | .447 |
| Valparaiso ‍‍‍ | 2 | – | 5 | – | 0 | .286 | 2 | – | 15 | – | 1 | .139 |
| Evansville ‍‍‍ | 1 | – | 4 | – | 2 | .286 | 2 | – | 12 | – | 3 | .206 |
| Indiana State ‍‍‍ | 1 | – | 5 | – | 1 | .214 | 3 | – | 11 | – | 2 | .250 |
| UNI ‍‍‍ | 1 | – | 6 | – | 0 | .143 | 5 | – | 11 | – | 0 | .313 |
† – Conference champion ‡ – 2019 Missouri Valley Tournament champion y – Invited to the NCAA tournament As of December 9, 2019; Rankings from United Soccer Coaches Poll; Source:Missouri Valley Conference

The 2019 Missouri Valley Conference women's soccer tournament was the postseason women's soccer tournament for the Missouri Valley Conference held from November 3 through November 10, 2019. The five match tournament took place at Allison South Stadium in Springfield, Missouri. The six-team single-elimination tournament consisted of three rounds based on seeding from regular season conference play. The defending champions were the Loyola Ramblers, who successfully defended their title by defeating Illinois State 2–0 in the final. The conference tournament title was the Second for the Loyloa women's soccer program and the second for head coach Barry Bimbi.

== Bracket ==
Opening Round; Nov. 3/4
3 | Missouri State | 1
6 | Evansville | 0
4 | Drake | 1
5 | Valparaiso | 0

Semifinals; Nov. 8
2 | Illinois State | 4^{OT}
3 | Missouri State | 3
1 | Loyola–Chicago | 1
4 | Drake | 0

Final; Nov. 10
2 | Illinois State | 0
1 | Loyola–Chicago | 2

== Schedule ==
=== Opening Round ===
| November 3, 2019 | #3 Missouri State | 1–0 | #6 Evansville | Springfield, Missouri |
| 4:00 p.m. | Kayleigh Putnam 11' | Report | | Stadium: Allison South Stadium; Attendance: 380; Referee: Shane Kennard; Assistant referees: Andy Ellsworth; Shane Cowger |

| November 4, 2019 | #4 Drake | 1–0 | #5 Valparaiso | Des Moines, Iowa |
| 7:00 p.m. | Cassie Rohan 15'; Rebecka Musungu (yellow card) 74' | Report | | Stadium: Tiger Field; Attendance: 537; Referee: Art Arustamayan; Assistant referees: Beznik Rexexpi; Vitale Hantsevich; Fourth official: Justin Mack |

=== Semifinals ===
| November 8, 2019 | #2 Illinois State | 4–3 (a.e.t.) | #3 Missouri State | Springfield, Missouri |
| 3:00 p.m. | Kate Del Fava 18', 67' (pen.); Natalie Vaughn-Low 25', 95'; Kaitlin Maxwell (yellow card) 67' | Report | 30' Kennady Orlick; 71' Olina Einarsdottir; 79' Unnur Bergsdottir | Stadium: Allison South Stadium; Attendance: 367; Referee: Cesar Ibarra; Assistant referees: Jared Palmer; Shane Cowger |

| November 8, 2019 | #1 Loyola–Chicago | 1–0 | #4 Drake | Springfield, Missouri |
| 6:00 p.m. | Sienna Cruz 15' | Report | (yellow card) 78' Delane Goertzen | Stadium: Allison South Stadium; Attendance: 253 |

=== Final ===
| November 10, 2019 | #1 Loyola–Chicago | 2–0 | #2 Illinois State | Springfield, Missouri |
| 1:00 p.m. | 39' Sienna Cruz; 54' Lindsey Hardiman | Report | Haley Smith (yellow card) 32' | Stadium: Allison South Stadium; Attendance: 587; Referee: Herber Estrada; Assistant referees: Shane Kennard; Daniel Ortega |

== Statistics ==
=== Goalscorers ===
2 Goals

- Sienna Cruz (Loyola-Chicago)
- Katie Del Fava (Illinois State)
- Natalie Vaughn-Low (Illinois State)

1 Goal

- Unnur Bergsdottir (Missouri State)
- Olina Einarsdottir (Missouri State)
- Lindsey Hardiman (Loyola-Chicago)
- Kennady Orlick (Missouri State)
- Kayleigh Putnam (Missouri State)
- Cassie Rohan (Drake)

== All-Tournament team ==
| Player | Team |
|---|---|
| **Sienna Cruz** | Loyola-Chicago |
| Lindsey Hardiman | Loyola-Chicago |
| Madison Laudeman | Loyola-Chicago |
| Abby Swanson | Loyola-Chicago |
| Natalie Vaughn-Low | Illinois State |
| Kate Del Fava | Illinois State |
| Haley Smith | Illinois State |
| Abby Stephenson | Drake |
| Cassie Rohan | Drake |
| Brooke Zenner | Missouri State |
| Kayleigh Putnam | Missouri State |
| Alizabeth Quillen | Valparaiso |
| Mikayla Harvey | Evansville |

MVP in bold
