= 2019 Ohio Valley Conference women's soccer tournament =

- Classification: Division I
- Teams: 8
- Matches: 7
- Attendance: 1,505
- Site: Houck Stadium; Cape Girardeau, Missouri (Semifinals & Final)
- Champions: Belmont (1st title)
- Winning coach: Heather Henson (1st title)
- MVP: Julie Garst (Belmont)
- Broadcast: OVC Digital Network

2019 Ohio Valley Conference women's soccer standings
	Conf.						Overall
Team	W		L		T	PCT	W		L		T	PCT
SEMO ‍†‍‍	8	–	1	–	1	.850	11	–	5	–	0	.688
Murray State ‍‍‍	8	–	2	–	0	.800	11	–	8	–	0	.579
UT Martin ‍‍‍	6	–	2	–	2	.700	8	–	6	–	5	.553
SIUE ‍‍‍	5	–	2	–	3	.650	10	–	5	–	5	.625
Tennessee Tech ‍‍‍	4	–	3	–	3	.550	6	–	8	–	5	.447
Belmont ‍‍‡‍^{y}	4	–	4	–	2	.500	8	–	9	–	5	.477
Austin Peay ‍‍‍	3	–	5	–	2	.400	4	–	10	–	4	.333
EIU ‍‍‍	2	–	5	–	3	.350	4	–	10	–	4	.333
EKU ‍‍‍	2	–	6	–	2	.300	4	–	12	–	2	.278
Morehead St. ‍‍‍	2	–	6	–	2	.300	4	–	12	–	2	.278
Jacksonville St. ‍‍‍	1	–	9	–	0	.100	4	–	14	–	0	.222
† – Conference champion ‡ – 2019 OVC Tournament champion y – Invited to the NCAA tournament As of December 9, 2019; Rankings from United Soccer Coaches Poll; Source:Ohio Valley Conference

The 2019 Ohio Valley Conference women's soccer tournament was the postseason women's soccer tournament for the Ohio Valley Conference held from November 1 through November 10, 2019. The first round and quarterfinals of the tournament were held at campus sites hosted by the #3 and #4 seeds, while the semifinals and final took place at Houck Stadium in Cape Girardeau, Missouri. The eight-team single-elimination tournament consisted of four rounds based on seeding from regular season conference play. The Murray State Racers were the defending champions and did not defend their title, losing to eventual champions Belmont 2–1 in the Semifinals. Belmont went on to beat SIUE on penalties in the final. The conference tournament title was the first for the Belmont women's soccer program and the first for head coach Heather Henson.

== Bracket ==
First round Friday, Nov. 1
5	Tennessee Tech	0
8	Eastern Illinois	2
6	Belmont	1^{OT}
7	Austin Peay	0

Quarterfinals; Sunday, Nov. 3
4	SIUE	1
8	Eastern Illinois	0
3	UT Martin	2
6	Belmont	3

Semifinals; Friday, Nov. 8
1	Southeast Missouri	1
4	SIUE	2
2	Murray State	1
6	Belmont	2

Final; Sunday, Nov. 10
4	SIUE	0 (2)
6	Belmont	0 (3)

== Schedule ==
=== First Round ===
November 1, 2019	#6 Belmont	1–0 (a.e.t.)	#7 Austin Peay	Martin, Tennessee
3:00 p.m.	Julie Garst 90'	Report		Stadium: Skyhawk Soccer Field; Attendance: 176; Referee: Robert Musoiu; Assistant referees: Keith Green; Gustavo Turmero; Fourth official: Claude Airall

November 1, 2019	#5 Tennessee Tech	0–2	#8 Eastern Illinois	Edwardsville, Illinois
7:00 p.m.		Report	31' Victoria Wharton; 55' Sarah DeWolf	Stadium: Ralph Korte Stadium; Referee: Justin Tomicich; Assistant referees: Brandon Wulff; Matthew Stein; Fourth official: Velimir Milovic

=== Quarterfinals ===
November 3, 2019	#3 UT Martin	2–3	#6 Belmont	Martin, Tennessee
2:00 p.m.	Bella Roberts 5', 77'; Nicole Collins (yellow card) 66'	Report	12', 80' Julie Garst; 70' Avery Nowak	Stadium: Skyhawk Soccer Field; Attendance: 213; Referee: Walter Heatherly; Assistant referees: Keith Green; Donovan Eubank; Fourth official: Claude Airall

November 3, 2019	#4 SIUE	1–0	#8 Eastern Illinois	Edwardsville, Illinois
2:00 p.m.	Eastern Illinois Own Goal 26'	Report		Stadium: Ralph Korte Stadium; Attendance: 241; Referee: Don Tebeau; Assistant referees: Matthew Rodman; Don Huber

=== Semifinals ===
November 8, 2019	#2 Murray State	1–2	#6 Belmont	Cape Girardeau, Missouri
	Miyah Watford 6'	Report	Rachel Vernon 12'; Niki Clements 28'	Stadium: Houck Stadium; Referee: Jeff Pulley; Assistant referees: Johann Arnason; Keith Green

November 8, 2019	#1 Southeast Missouri	1–2	#4 SIUE	Cape Girardeau, Missouri
6:30 p.m.	Hailey Block 85' (pen.)	Report	41' Mackenzie Litzsinger; 77' Megan Keeven; (yellow card) 80' (yellow-red card) 85' Myah Diekema	Stadium: Houck Stadium; Attendance: 523; Referee: Saul Gonzales; Assistant referees: Joe Radzialoki; Tyler Swanner

=== Final ===
November 10, 2019	#4 SIUE	0–0 (a.e.t.) (2–3 p)	#6 Belmont	Cape Girardeau, Missouri
2:00 p.m.		Report		Stadium: Houck Stadium; Attendance: 352; Referee: Ryan Ashe; Assistant referees: Jose Renda; Robert Nusoiu
	Penalties
	Kayla Klipsch (penalty scored); Courtney Vollmer (penalty scored); Emma Dutko (penalty missed); Mackenzie Litzsinger (penalty missed); Andrea Frerker (penalty missed)		(penalty scored) Kameron Ziesig; (penalty missed) Rachel Vernon; (penalty scored) Julie Garst; (penalty missed) Avery Nowak; (penalty scored) Sydney Cason

== Statistics ==
=== Goalscorers ===
3 Goals

- Julie Garst (Belmont)

2 Goals

- Bella Roberts (UT Martin)

1 Goal

- Hailey Block (Southeast Missouri)
- Niki Clements (Belmont)
- Sarah DeWolf (Eastern Illinois)
- Megan Keeven (SIUE)
- Mackenzie Litzsinger (SIUE)
- Avery Nowak (Belmont)
- Rachel Vernon (Belmont)
- Miyah Watford (Murray State)
- Victoria Wharton (Eastern Illinois)

Own Goals

- Eastern Illinois vs. SIUE

== All-Tournament team ==
Player	Team
**Julie Garst**	Belmont
AB Hawkins	Belmont
Rachel Vernon	Belmont
Lily Herman	Belmont
Angel Ikeda	SIUE
Alexis Royal	SIUE
Becca Jostes	SIUE
Natalie Jackson	Southeast Missouri
Esmie Gonzales	Southeast Missouri
Karsyn Hasch	Murray State
Miyah Watford	Murray State

MVP in bold
