= Paula Ruess =

German footballer (born 1999)

Personal information
- Date of birth: 24 October 1999 (age 27)
- Place of birth: Affalterbach, Baden-Württemberg, Germany
- Height: 1.68 m (5 ft 6 in)
- Position: Defender

Team information
- Current team: Trabzon
- Number: 4

Youth career
- 2017–2018: Sindelfingen Ladies U17

College career
Years	Team	Apps	(Gls)
2018–2022	Fairleigh Dickinson Knights	75	(1)

Senior career*
Years	Team	Apps	(Gls)
2022–2023	NJ Alliance		
2023–2025	Albergaria		
2025–	Trabzon	4	(0)
- * Club domestic league appearances and goals as of 15 October 2025

Paula Ruess (born 24 October 1999) is a German professional football defender who plays in the Turkish Super League for Trabzon . She has also United States citizenship.

== Personal life ==
Oaula Ruess was born to Stefan and Susanne in Affalterbach, Ludwigsburg, Baden-Württemberg, Germany on 24 October 1999. She has a brother, Hannes.

After completing high school at Johann-Friedrich-von-Cotta-Schule in Stuttgart, Germany, she went to the United States in 2018, and attended Fairleigh Dickinson University at Teaneck, New Jersey.

== Club career ==
Ruess was a member of the varsity high school soccer team. She played club football for the Sindelfingen Ladies U17 team in the 2017–18 season of 2. Frauen-Bundesliga, where she appeared in 17 matches.

During her university years, she was a member of the varsity college team at Fairleigh Dickinson from 2018 to 2022. She appeared in 75 games in total, and scored one goal.

After graduation, she remained in the United States, and joined New Jersey Alliance to play in the 2022–23 season.

In August 2023, she signed her first professional contract with the Portuguese club Albergaria. Her contract was extended for the 2024–25 season, she so played two seasons in the Liga BPI.

In the beginning of July 2025, she moved to Turkey, and signed with Turkish Super League club Trabzon.
