= 2019 Patriot League women's soccer tournament =

- Classification: Division I
- Teams: 6
- Matches: 5
- Attendance: 3,867
- Site: Glenn Warner Soccer Facility; Annapolis, Maryland (Semifinals and Final)
- Champions: Navy (4th title)
- Winning coach: Carin Gabarra (4th title)
- MVP: Carolyn Mang (Navy)
- Broadcast: Patriot League Network (Final)

2019 Patriot League women's soccer standings
	Conf.						Overall
Team	W		L		T	PCT	W		L		T	PCT
Navy ‍†‍‡‍^{y}	6	–	1	–	2	.778	16	–	3	–	3	.795
Holy Cross ‍‍‍	3	–	1	–	5	.611	5	–	4	–	8	.529
Army ‍‍‍	4	–	3	–	2	.556	9	–	7	–	4	.550
Loyola (MD) ‍‍‍	3	–	2	–	3	.563	7	–	7	–	5	.500
Lafayette ‍‍‍	3	–	2	–	4	.556	7	–	5	–	5	.559
Colgate ‍‍‍	3	–	3	–	3	.500	5	–	8	–	4	.412
Bucknell ‍‍‍	3	–	4	–	2	.444	5	–	11	–	2	.333
Lehigh ‍‍‍	3	–	5	–	1	.389	5	–	8	–	5	.417
Boston U ‍‍‍	2	–	6	–	1	.278	5	–	12	–	2	.316
American ‍‍‍	1	–	4	–	4	.333	6	–	8	–	4	.444
† – Conference champion ‡ – 2019 Patriot League tournament champion y – Invited to the NCAA tournament As of December 9, 2019; Rankings from United Soccer Coaches Poll; Source:Patriot League

The 2019 Patriot League women's soccer tournament was the postseason women's soccer tournament for the Patriot League held from November 5 through November 10, 2019. The quarterfinals of the tournament were held at campus sites, while the semifinals and final took place at Glenn Warner Soccer Facility in Annapolis, Maryland. The six-team single-elimination tournament consisted of three rounds based on seeding from regular season conference play. The defending champions were the Boston University Terriers, however they were unable to defend their crown, after failing to qualify for the tournament by finishing ninth in regular season play. The tournament was won by Navy, who were the #1 seed and defeated Army 2–1 in the final. The conference championship was the fourth for the Navy women's soccer program, all of which have come under coach Carom Babarra.

== Bracket ==
Quarterfinals; Tuesday, Nov. 5
3	Army	4
6	Colgate	0
4	Loyola (MD)	1^{2OT}
5	Lafayette	0

Semifinals; Friday, Nov. 8
1	Navy	1 (4)
4	Loyola (MD)	1 (3)
2	Holy Cross	1
3	Army	2

Final; Sunday, Nov. 10
1	Navy	2
3	Army	1

== Schedule ==
=== Quarterfinals ===
November 5, 2019	#3 Army	4–0	#6 Colgate	West Point, New York
7:00 p.m. EST	Lauren Drysdale 4'; Mia Padon (yellow card) 10'; Erynn Johns 15', 52'; Alyssa Carfagno 30'	Report		Stadium: James Clinton Field; Attendance: 1,150; Referee: Danny Marques; Assistant referees: Alex Casella; Magda Zwierzchowski; Fourth official: Luis Arroyo

November 5, 2019	#4 Loyola (MD)	1–0 (a.e.t.)	#5 Lafayette	Baltimore, Maryland
7:00 p.m. EST	Sarah Bayer (yellow card) 67'; Hannah Hoefs 107'	Report	(yellow card) 104' Lindie Gibbs; (yellow card) 106' Ariana Aliprantis	Stadium: Ridley Athletic Complex; Attendance: 298; Referee: Adorae Whitesel; Assistant referees: Bobby Cordrey; Jonah Kind; Fourth official: Scarlet Keane

=== Semifinals ===
November 8, 2019	#1 Navy	1–1 (a.e.t.) (4–3 p)	#4 Loyola (MD)	Annapolis, Maryland
4:05 p.m. EST	Gina Peraino 42'; Baseley McClaskey (yellow card) 51'	Report	78' Hannah Hoefs	Stadium: Glenn Warner Soccer Facility; Attendance: 681; Referee: Meghan Mullen; Assistant referees: Dustin Killick; Alla Stepanov; Fourth official: James Sadowski
	Penalties
	Gina Peraino (penalty missed); Alex Jackson (penalty scored); Gabby Gordon (penalty scored); Baseley McClaskey (penalty scored); Emily Keast (penalty scored)		(penalty scored) Hannah Hoefs; (penalty scored) Sabrina Daglish; (penalty missed) Nicole Rivas; (penalty scored) Kate Reese; (penalty missed) Julia Gray

November 8, 2019	#2 Holy Cross	1–2	#3 Army	Annapolis, Maryland
7:25 p.m. EST	Sydney Fisher 47'	Report	Dara Murray 25'; Lauren Drysdale 66'	Stadium: Glenn Warner Soccer Facility; Attendance: 214; Referee: Danielle Chesky; Assistant referees: Brendan Orino; Anelise Cimino; Fourth official: Matthew Richardson

=== Final ===
November 10, 2019	#1 Navy	2–1	#3 Army	Annapolis, Maryland
1:05 p.m. EST	Carolyn Mang 60'; Victoria Tran 78'	Report	19' Morgan Walsh	Stadium: Glenn Warner Soccer Facility; Attendance: 1,524; Referee: Jeremy Scheer; Assistant referees: Moo Hackett; Garrison Fratoni; Fourth official: Lucia Allen

== Statistics ==
=== Goalscorers ===
2 Goals

- Lauren Drysdale (Army)
- Hannah Hoefs (Loyola (MD))
- Erynn Johns (Army)

1 Goal

- Alyssa Carfagno (Army)
- Sydney Fisher (Holy Cross)
- Carolyn Mang (Navy)
- Dara Murray (Army)
- Gina Peraino (Navy)
- Victoria Tran (Navy)
- Morgan Walsh (Army)

== All-Tournament team ==
Player	Team
**Carolyn Mang**	Navy
Victoria Tran	Navy
Alex Jackson	Navy
Avery Fries	Navy
Sydney Cassalia	Army
Erynn Johns	Army
Lauren Drysdale	Army
Sydney Fisher	Holy Cross
Katie Quinn	Holy Cross
Maddie Hart	Loyola (MD)
Hannah Hoefs	Loyola (MD)

MVP in bold

== See also ==
- 2019 Patriot League Men's Soccer Tournament
