= 2019 American Athletic Conference women's soccer tournament =

- Classification: Division I
- Teams: 6
- Matches: 5
- Attendance: 948
- Site: Billy J. Murphy Track & Soccer Complex; Memphis, Tennessee
- Champions: South Florida (2nd title)
- Winning coach: Denise Schilte-Brown (2nd title)
- MVP: Evelyne Viens (Offensive); Sydney Martinez (Defensive) (South Florida)
- Broadcast: American Digital Network (Semifinals); ESPNU (Final)

2019 American Athletic Conference women's soccer standings
	Conf.						Overall
Team	W		L		T	PCT	W		L		T	PCT
No. 21 Memphis ‍†‍‍^{y}	8	–	0	–	1	.944	17	–	3	–	1	.833
No. 16 USF ‍‍‡‍^{y}	7	–	2	–	0	.778	16	–	5	–	0	.762
UCF ‍‍‍	5	–	2	–	2	.667	11	–	4	–	4	.684
Cincinnati ‍‍‍	5	–	3	–	1	.611	7	–	9	–	3	.447
SMU ‍‍‍	4	–	5	–	0	.444	12	–	7	–	1	.625
Houston ‍‍‍	3	–	6	–	0	.333	6	–	14	–	0	.300
UConn ‍‍‍	2	–	5	–	2	.333	6	–	8	–	3	.441
Temple ‍‍‍	2	–	5	–	2	.333	5	–	9	–	5	.395
East Carolina ‍‍‍	2	–	5	–	2	.333	5	–	10	–	3	.361
Tulsa ‍‍‍	2	–	7	–	0	.222	8	–	11	–	0	.421
† – Conference champion ‡ – 2019 AAC Tournament champion y – Invited to the NCAA tournament As of December 11, 2019; Rankings from United Soccer Coaches Poll; Source:American Athletic Conference

The 2019 American Athletic Conference women's soccer tournament was the postseason women's soccer tournament for the American Athletic Conference held from November 3 to November 10, 2019. The first round was hosted by the higher seed, and the Semifinals and Final took place at the home field of the regular season champion. Memphis. The six-team single-elimination tournament consisted of three rounds based on seeding from regular season conference play. The Memphis are the defending tournament champions. Memphis was unable to defend its title, losing 2–0 to South Florida in the final. USF's win was the program's second and also the second for coach Denise Schilte-Brown.

== Bracket ==
First round Sunday, Nov. 3
6	Houston	0
3	UCF	5
5	SMU	1
4	Cincinnati	0

Semifinals; Friday, Nov. 8
2	South Florida	2
3	UCF	1
1	Memphis	4
5	SMU	2

Final; Sunday, Nov. 10
2	South Florida	2
1	Memphis	0

== Schedule ==
=== First Round ===
November 3, 2019	#3 UCF	5–0	#6 Houston	Orlando, FL
1:00 p.m.	Ellie Moreno 1'; Darya Rajaee 21'; Dayana Martin 48', 56'; Jessica Taylor 66'	Report	(yellow card) 29' Amy Nguyen	Stadium: UCF Soccer and Track Stadium; Attendance: 218; Referee: Daniel Gutierrez; Assistant referees: Sergio Virviescas; Edin Kapidzic; Fourth official: Hassan Belmnahia

November 3, 2019	#4 Cincinnati	0–1	#5 SMU	Cincinnati, OH
12:00 p.m.		Report	50' Brooke Golik; (yellow card) 86' Celiana Torres	Stadium: Gettler Stadium; Attendance: 173; Referee: Andy Milby; Assistant referees: Britton Maier; Brian DiPiro; Fourth official: Brad Koewlers

=== Semifinals ===
November 8, 2019	#2 USF	3–1	#3 UCF	Memphis, TN
4:30 p.m.	Evelyne Viens 34', 57'	Report	(yellow card) 65' Madison Murnin; 68' (pen.) Elise Legrout	Stadium: Billy J. Murphy Track & Soccer Complex; Referee: Noeal Cotterell; Assistant referees: Jessica Carnevale; Mark Allatin; Fourth official: Joseph Poremba

November 8, 2019	#1 Memphis	4–2	#5 SMU	Memphis, TN
7:00 p.m.	Lisa Pechersky 1'; Tanya Boychuk 38' (pen.); Kimberley Smit 51'; Clarissa Larisey 89'	Report	(yellow card) 40' Katharine Herron; 48' Allie Thornton; 66' Jewel Boland	Stadium: Billy J. Murphy Track & Soccer Complex; Referee: Cassio Ribiero; Assistant referees: Bruno Mozzo; Joseph Poremba; Fourth official: Steven Scott

=== Final ===
November 10, 2019	#1 Memphis	0–2	#2 USF	Memphis, TN
1:00 p.m.	Serena Dolan (yellow card) 80'	Report	64', 66' Evelyne Viens; (yellow card) 88' Aubrey Megrath	Stadium: Billy J. Murphy Track & Soccer Complex; Attendance: 557; Referee: Mark Allatin; Assistant referees: Bruno Mozzo; Benjamin Meyer; Fourth official: Steven Scott

== Statistics ==
=== Goalscorers ===
4 Goals

- Evelyne Viens (USF)

2 Goals

- Dayana Martin (UCF)

1 Goal

- Jewel Boland (SMU)
- Tanya Boychuk (Memphis)
- Brooke Golik (SMU)
- Clarissa Larisey (Memphis)
- Elise Legrout (UCF)
- Ellie Moreno (UCF)
- Lisa Pechersky (Memphis)
- Darya Ragaee (UCF)
- Kimberley Smit (Memphis)
- Jessica Taylor (UCF)
- Allie Thornton (SMU)

== All-Tournament team ==
Player	Team
Evelyne Viens*	USF
Sydney Martinez^	USF
Sydny Nasello	USF
Andrea Hauksdottir	USF
Caroline DeLisle	UCF
Ellie Moreno	UCF
Clair Abrey	Memphis
Serena Dolan	Memphis
Stasia Mallin	Memphis
Allie Thornton	SMU
Jewel Boland	SMU

* Offensive MVP
^ Defensive MVP

== See also ==
- 2019 American Athletic Conference Men's Soccer Tournament
