= 2019 SWAC women's soccer tournament =

- Classification: Division I
- Teams: 8
- Matches: 7
- Attendance: 556
- Site: PVA&M Soccer Stadium; Prairie View, Texas
- Champions: Prairie View A&M (1st title)
- Winning coach: Sonia Curvelo (1st title)
- MVP: Kalia Brown (Prairie View A&M)
- Broadcast: SWAC Digital Network (Final)

2019 SWAC women's soccer standings
	Conf.						Overall
Team	W		L		T	PCT	W		L		T	PCT
Howard ‍†‍‍	9	–	1	–	0	.900	13	–	3	–	0	.813
Prairie View A&M ‍†‍‡‍^{y}	9	–	1	–	0	.900	11	–	7	–	0	.611
Jackson State ‍‍‍	7	–	3	–	0	.700	7	–	11	–	0	.389
Alabama A&M ‍‍‍	7	–	3	–	0	.700	9	–	8	–	1	.528
Grambling State ‍‍‍	6	–	4	–	0	.600	10	–	10	–	1	.500
Texas Southern ‍‍‍	5	–	4	–	1	.550	6	–	10	–	1	.382
Alabama State ‍‍‍	4	–	6	–	0	.400	5	–	14	–	0	.263
Southern ‍‍‍	3	–	6	–	1	.350	4	–	11	–	1	.281
UAPB ‍‍‍	3	–	7	–	0	.300	5	–	12	–	0	.294
Alcorn State ‍‍‍	1	–	9	–	0	.100	1	–	15	–	0	.063
Mississippi Valley St ‍‍‍	0	–	10	–	0	.000	1	–	14	–	1	.094
† – Conference champion ‡ – 2019 SWAC Tournament champion y – Invited to the NCAA Tournament; As of November 15, 2019; Rankings from United Soccer Coaches Poll; Source:SWAC

The 2019 SWAC women's soccer tournament was the postseason women's soccer tournament for the Southwestern Athletic Conference held November 7–10, 2019. The seven-match tournament took place at the Prairie View A&M Soccer Stadium in Prairie View, Texas. The eight-team single-elimination tournament consisted of three rounds based on seeding from regular season conference play. The defending champions were the Howard Bison, however they were unable to defend their title, losing 1–0 to the Prairie View A&M Panthers in the final. The conference tournament title was the first in the history of the Paririe View A&M women's soccer program, and the first for head coach Sonia Curvelo.

== Bracket ==
Quarterfinals; Thursday, Nov. 7
1	Howard	1
8	Southern	0
4	Alabama A&M	0
5	Grambling State	1
3	Jackson State	1 (9)
6	Texas Southern	1 (8)
2	Prairie View A&M	1
7	Alabama State	0

Semifinals; Friday, Nov. 8
1	Howard	2^{OT}
5	Grambling State	1
3	Jackson State	0
2	Prairie View A&M	2

Final; Sunday, Nov. 10
1	Howard	0
2	Prairie View A&M	1

== Schedule ==
=== Quarterfinals ===
November 7, 2019	#1 Howard	1–0	#8 Southern	Prairie View, Texas
10:00 a.m.	Arianna Morgan 20'; Madison Myles (yellow card) 38'; Kiara Flynn (yellow card) 51'	Report		Stadium: PVA&M Soccer Stadium; Attendance: 72; Referee: Deepak Lumba; Assistant referees: Wes Caoute; Ricard Hernandez; Fourth official: Darrin Browder

November 7, 2019	#4 Alabama A&M	0–1	#5 Grambling State	Prairie View, Texas
12:30 p.m.	Amaya Gill (yellow card) 64'; Jameela Barrett (yellow card) 79'	Report	(yellow card) 20' Mackenzie Rastatter; (yellow card) 35' Stevie Maddox; (yellow card) 74' Sarah Teubner; 77' (pen.) Florence David	Stadium: PVA&M Soccer Stadium

November 7, 2019	#3 Jackson State	1–1 (a.e.t.) (9–8 p)	#6 Texas Southern	Prairie View, Texas
3:00 p.m.	Alexis Henriquez 22'; Patricia Calderon (yellow card) 34'	Report	44' Cassie Sandoval; (yellow card) 100' Kayla Smith	Stadium: PVA&M Soccer Stadium
	Penalties
	Ivana Setka (penalty missed); Alexis Henriquez (penalty missed); Sage Magruder (penalty scored); Sydni Wilson (penalty scored); Ana Leticia Batista (penalty scored); Megan Howell (penalty missed); Patricia Calderon (penalty scored); Brynn Walker (penalty missed); Jalah Carter (penalty scored); Pernille Kelm (penalty scored); Sydni Wilson (penalty scored); Sage Magruder (penalty scored); Ana Leticia Batista (penalty scored)		(penalty missed) Brooke Ianiero; (penalty scored) Taylor Stokes; (penalty scored) Bailey Blalock; (penalty missed) Begona Rodriquez-Bravo; (penalty scored) Cassie Sandoval; (penalty missed) Madison Phillips; (penalty scored) Mireya Del Abra; (penalty missed) Jada MacLean; (penalty scored) Mackenzie Johnson; (penalty scored) Asia Sylvan; (penalty scored) Bailey Blalock; (penalty scored) Taylor Stokes; (penalty missed) Mireya Del Abra

November 7, 2019	#2 Prairie View A&M	1–0	#7 Alabama State	Prairie View, Texas
5:30 p.m.	Lesa Griffin 37'	Report		Stadium: PVA&M Soccer Stadium; Referee: Estef Estrada; Assistant referees: Albert Keyi-Mensah; George Kubove; Fourth official: Emily Gomez

=== Semifinals ===
November 8, 2019	#1 Howard	2–1 (a.e.t.)	#5 Grambling State	Prairie View, Texas
3:00 p.m.	Kendall Macauly (yellow card) 66', 109'; Victoria Thornton 75'	Report	1' Miranda Urbizu; (yellow card) 50' Haylee O'Leary; (yellow card) 10' Stevie Maddox	Stadium: PVA&M Soccer Stadium

November 8, 2019	#2 Prairie View A&M	2–0	#3 Jackson State	Prairie View, Texas
5:30 p.m.	Alexis Mack 1'; Maya Swaby-Wallerson (yellow card) 46'; Sonia Feuntes (yellow card) 60'; Ashley Chala 64'	Report	(yellow card) 85' Ana Leticia Batista; (yellow card) 85' Patricia Calderon; (yellow card) 86' Jolene Ceniceros	Stadium: PVA&M Soccer Stadium; Attendance: 69; Referee: Wesley Caouette; Assistant referees: Sean Caouette; Deepak Lumba; Fourth official: Emily Gomez

=== Final ===
November 10, 2019	#1 Howard	0–1	#2 Prairie View A&M	Prairie View, Texas
11:00 a.m.		Report	56' Kalia Brown; (yellow card) 71' Gina Zaval De Rojas	Stadium: PVA&M Soccer Stadium; Attendance: 415; Referee: Darrin Browder; Assistant referees: Albert Kyei-Mensah; Wes Caouette; Fourth official: Sean Caouette

== Statistics ==
=== Goalscorers ===
1 Goal

- Kalia Brown (Prairie View A&M)
- Ashley Chala (Prairie View A&M)
- Florence David (Grambling State)
- Lesa Griffin (Prairie View A&M)
- Alexis Henriquez (Jackson State)
- Kendall Macauly (Howard)
- Alexis Mack (Prairie View A&M)
- Arianna Morgan (Howard)
- Cassie Sandoval (Texas Southern)
- Victoria Thornton (Howard)
- Miranda Urbizu (Grambling State)

== All-Tournament team ==
Player	Team
Florence David	Grambling State
Ashley Thomas	Alabama State
Lemauriel Johnson	Texas Southern
Aniya Clarke	Southern
Patricia Caldron	Jackson State
Jalah Carter	Jackson State
Kendall Macauly	Howard
Victoria Thornton	Howard
**Kalia Brown**	Prairie View A&M
D'Sanya Nugent	Prairie View A&M
Quinn Josiah	Prairie View A&M

MVP in bold
