= 2019 Mountain West Conference women's soccer tournament =

U.S. women's soccer tournament

- Classification: Division I
- Teams: 6
- Matches: 5
- Attendance: 1,481
- Site: Boas Tennis/Soccer Complex; Boise, Idaho
- Champions: Boise State (1st title)
- Winning coach: Jim Thomas (1st title)
- MVP: Raimee Sherle (Boise State)
- Broadcast: MountainWest Sports Network

2019 Mountain West Conference women's soccer standings
	Conf.						Overall
Team	W		L		T	PCT	W		L		T	PCT
Boise State ‍†‍‡‍^{y}	8	–	3	–	0	.727	18	–	5	–	0	.783
San Diego St ‍†‍‍	8	–	3	–	0	.727	10	–	9	–	1	.525
Colorado St ‍‍‍	7	–	3	–	1	.682	12	–	5	–	3	.675
New Mexico ‍‍‍	6	–	4	–	1	.591	11	–	8	–	1	.575
San Jose St ‍‍‍	5	–	4	–	2	.545	7	–	9	–	4	.450
Fresno State ‍‍‍	5	–	4	–	2	.545	9	–	7	–	4	.550
Colorado College ‍‍‍	5	–	6	–	0	.455	10	–	7	–	0	.588
Air Force ‍‍‍	5	–	6	–	0	.455	10	–	7	–	1	.583
Wyoming ‍‍‍	4	–	5	–	2	.455	7	–	7	–	5	.500
Utah State ‍‍‍	3	–	7	–	1	.318	8	–	10	–	1	.447
Nevada ‍‍‍	3	–	8	–	0	.273	4	–	14	–	0	.222
UNLV ‍‍‍	2	–	8	–	1	.227	6	–	13	–	1	.325
† – Conference champion ‡ – 2019 MW Tournament champion y – Invited to the NCAA tournament As of December 9, 2019; Rankings from United Soccer Coaches Poll; Source:Mountain West Conference

The 2019 Mountain West Conference women's soccer tournament was the postseason women's soccer tournament for the Mountain West Conference held from November through November 9, 2019. The five-match tournament took place at Boas Tennis/Soccer Complex in Boise, Idaho. The six-team single-elimination tournament consisted of three rounds based on seeding from regular season conference play. The San Jose State Spartans were the defending champions, but were unable to defend their title, losing to the New Mexico Lobos 1–0 in the first round. The San Jose State Spartans won the tournament with a 2–0 win over San Diego St in the final. This was the first tournament championship for Boise State, and the first for coach Jim Thomas. Boise State was the regular season champions two years in a row, but 2019 was the first time they converted that into a tournament title.

== Bracket ==
Quarterfinals; Tuesday, Nov. 5
4	New Mexico	1^{OT}
5	San Jose St	0
3	Colorado St	0 (1)
6	Fresno State	0 (3)

Semifinals; Thursday, Nov. 7
1	Boise State	6
4	New Mexico	0
2	San Diego St	3
6	Fresno State	2

Final; Saturday, Nov. 9
1	Boise State	2
2	San Diego St	0

== Schedule ==
=== Quarterfinals ===
November 5, 2019	#3 Colorado St	0–0 (a.e.t.) (1–3 p)	#6 Fresno State	Boise, Idaho
11:00 a.m. MT		Report	(yellow card) 54' Kasidee Wiley; (yellow card) 108' Audrey Reyna	Stadium: Boas Tennis/Soccer Complex; Referee: Corbyn May; Assistant referees: Jason Hutchinson; Raymond Verveckken; Fourth official: Daniel Xanchez
	Penalties
	Addie Wright (penalty missed); Kristen Noonan (penalty missed); Gracie Armstrong (penalty scored); Kaitlyn Abrams (penalty missed)		(penalty scored) Kasidee Wiley; (penalty missed) Ele Avery; (penalty scored) Audrey Reyna; (penalty scored) Jordan Brown

November 5, 2019	#4 New Mexico	1–0 (a.e.t.)	#5 San Jose St	Boise, Idaho
2:00 p.m. MT	Leilani Baker 98'	Report	(yellow card) 88' Darrian Reed	Stadium: Boas Tennis/Soccer Complex; Attendance: 120

=== Semifinals ===
November 7, 2019	#2 San Diego St	3–2	#6 Fresno State	Boise, Idaho
11:00 a.m. MT	Taylor Moorehead 27'; Rachel Elve 30'; Kiera Utush 40', (yellow card) 71'; Team (yellow card) 64'; Malia Kaleioh (yellow card) 68'; Jessica Sanders (yellow card) 82'	Report	30', 38', (yellow card) 71' Melissa Ellis; (yellow card) 40' Team; (yellow card) 44' Sydni Lunt	Stadium: Boas Tennis/Soccer Complex; Attendance: 59; Referee: Megan McCain; Assistant referees: Stearn Briem; Jason Steiner; Fourth official: Alexander Jones

November 7, 2019	#1 Boise State	6–0	#4 New Mexico	Boise, Idaho
2:00 p.m. MT	Raimee Sherle 23', 24', 54'; Aubree Chatterton 25'; Gabby Gillespie 43', 84'; Jennifer Turnek (yellow card) 68'	Report	(yellow card) 21' Alesia Garcia; (yellow card) 83' Madi Hirschman	Stadium: Boas Tennis/Soccer Complex; Referee: Ben Oakley; Assistant referees: Alexander Jones; Riley Jones; Fourth official: Stearne Briem

=== Final ===
November 9, 2019	#1 Boise State	2–0	#2 San Diego St	Boise, Idaho
12:00 p.m. MT	Raimee Sherle 16'; McKenna Kynett 49'; Morgan Stone (yellow card) 59'; Gabby Gillespie (yellow card) 72'	Report	(yellow card) 55' Kiera Utush; (yellow card) 87' Malia Kaleiohi	Stadium: Boas Tennis/Soccer Complex; Attendance: 1,302; Referee: Nicholas Marin-Kumko; Assistant referees: Kali Smith; Jason Hutchinson; Fourth official: Nicole Steiner

== Statistics ==
=== Goalscorers ===
4 Goals

- Raimee Sherle (Boise State)

2 Goals

- Melissa Ellis (Fresno State)
- Gabby Gillespie (Boise State)

1 Goal

- Leilani Baker (New Mexico)
- Aubree Chatterton (Boise State)
- Rachel Elve (San Diego State)
- McKenna Kynett (Boise State)
- Taylor Moorehead (San Diego State)
- Kiera Utush (San Diego State)

== All-Tournament team ==
Player	Team
**Raimee Sherle**	Boise State
Macie Nelson	Boise State
Kristina Serres	Boise State
Morgan Stone	Boise State
Chloe Frisch	San Diego State
Laura Fuentes	San Diego State
Taylor Moorehead	San Diego State
Leilani Baker	New Mexico
Jadyn Edwards	New Mexico
Melissa Ellis	Fresno State
Sydni Lunt	Fresno State

MVP in bold
