= 2019 WAC women's soccer tournament =

- Classification: Division I
- Teams: 6
- Matches: 5
- Attendance: 1,558
- Site: Championship Field; Seattle, Washington
- Champions: Seattle (5th title)
- Winning coach: Julie Woodward (5th title)
- MVP: Jessie Ray (Seattle)
- Broadcast: WAC Digital Network

2019 WAC women's soccer standings
	Conf.						Overall
Team	W		L		T	PCT	W		L		T	PCT
Seattle ‍†‍‡‍^{y}	6	–	1	–	1	.813	12	–	8	–	2	.591
California Baptist ‍‍‍	6	–	2	–	0	.750	13	–	5	–	1	.711
Utah Valley ‍‍‍	5	–	3	–	0	.625	11	–	9	–	1	.548
Kansas City ‍‍‍	4	–	2	–	2	.625	13	–	4	–	4	.714
CSU Bakersfield ‍‍‍	4	–	4	–	0	.500	9	–	9	–	2	.500
UTRGV ‍‍‍	3	–	4	–	1	.438	9	–	8	–	3	.525
New Mexico State ‍‍‍	3	–	5	–	0	.375	4	–	12	–	2	.278
Grand Canyon ‍‍‍	3	–	5	–	0	.375	4	–	14	–	1	.237
Chicago State ‍‍‍	0	–	8	–	0	.000	0	–	19	–	0	.000
† – Conference champion ‡ – 2019 WAC Tournament champion y – Invited to the NCAA tournament As of December 9, 2019; Rankings from United Soccer Coaches Poll; Source:WAC

The 2019 Western Athletic Conference women's soccer tournament was the postseason women's soccer tournament for the Western Athletic Conference held from November 6 to November 10, 2019. The five match tournament took place at Championship Field in Seattle, Washington on the campus of Seattle University. The six-team single-elimination tournament consisted of three rounds based on seeding from regular season conference play. The defending champions were the Seattle Redhawks, who successfully defended their title, defeating Utah Valley 2–1 in the final. This was the fifth WAC women's soccer tournament championship for the Seattle women's soccer program, all of which have come under head coach Julie Woodward.

== Bracket ==
First round Wednesday, Nov. 6
4	CSU Bakersfield	1 (0)
5	UTRGV	1 (2)
3	Kansas City	2
6	Grand Canyon	0

Semifinals; Friday, Nov. 8
1	Seattle	1
5	UTRGV	0
2	Utah Valley	3
3	Kansas City	1

Final; Sunday, Nov. 10
1	Seattle	2^{OT}
2	Utah Valley	1

== Schedule ==
=== First Round ===
November 6, 2019	#4 CSU Bakersfield	1–1 (a.e.t.) (0–2 p)	#5 UTRGV	Seattle, Washington
4:00 p.m.	Eszter Toth 36'	Report	53' Emily Zapata; (yellow card) 79' Dianna Ansah	Stadium: Championship Field; Referee: Kelsey Harms; Assistant referees: Baboucarr Jallow; Ramond Mendez; Fourth official: Scott Lawrence
	Penalties
	Sophie Freeman (penalty missed); Caitlin Goetjen (penalty missed); Dana Neff (penalty missed); Chelsee Duran (penalty missed)		(penalty missed) Emily Zapata; (penalty missed) Katherine Stokely; (penalty scored) Elina Seppala; (penalty scored) Sarah Bonney

November 6, 2019	#3 Kansas City	2–0	#6 Grand Canyon	Seattle, Washington
7:00 p.m.	Claire Larson 20'; Emma Wilson (yellow card) 28'; Amanda Sampson 77'	Report	(yellow card) 40' Camryn Larson	Stadium: Championship Field; Attendance: 350; Referee: Karen Callado Ferreira; Assistant referees: Will Niccolls; Joe Tompkins; Fourth official: Jesus Hernandez-Balbas

=== Semifinals ===
November 8, 2019	#1 Seattle	1–0	#5 UTRGV	Seattle, Washington
4:00 p.m.	Lauren Brown 76'; Leahi Manthei (yellow card) 89'	Report		Stadium: Championship Field; Referee: Karen Callado Ferreira; Assistant referees: Christopher Turner; Cameron Siler; Fourth official: Christine Suter

November 8, 2019	#2 Utah Valley	3–1	#3 Kansas City	Seattle, Washington
7:00 p.m.	Katie Haskins 32'; Jocelyn Bybee 42'; Megan Sullivan (yellow card) 63'; Amber Tripp 80'	Report	27' Lindsey Prokop; (yellow card) 63' Claire Larson	Stadium: Championship Field; Attendance: 572; Referee: Kelsey Harms; Assistant referees: Cuahutemoc Delgadillo; Cephas Quartson; Fourth official: John Snyder

=== Final ===
November 10, 2019	#1 Seattle	2–1	#2 Utah Valley	Seattle, Washington
1:00 p.m.	Leahi Manthei 86'; Jessie Ray 98'	Report	31' Amber Tripp	Stadium: Championship Field; Attendance: 636; Referee: Samantha Martinez; Assistant referees: Will Niccolls; Cameron Siler; Fourth official: Levi Rippy

== Statistics ==
=== Goalscorers ===
2 Goals

- Amber Tripp (Utah Valley)

1 Goal

- Lauren Brown (Seattle)
- Jocelyn Bybee (Utah Valley)
- Katie Haskins (Utah Valley)
- Claire Larson (Kansas City)
- Leahi Manthei (Seattle)
- Lindsey Prokop (Kansas City)
- Jessie Ray (Seattle)
- Amanda Sampson (Kansas City)
- Eszter Toth (CSU Bakersfield)
- Emily Zapata (UT Rio Grande Valley)

== All-Tournament team ==
Player	Team
Lindsey Prokop	Kansas City
Claire Larson	Kansas City
Kinga Szemik	UT Rio Grande Valley
Emily Zapata	UT Rio Grande Valley
Amber Tripp	Utah Valley
Katie Haskins	Utah Valley
Jocelyn Bybee	Utah Valley
Leahi Manthei	Seattle
Holly Rothering	Seattle
Lauren Brown	Seattle
**Jessie Ray**	Seattle

MVP in bold
