= 2019 America East Conference women's soccer tournament =

- Classification: Division I
- Teams: 6
- Matches: 5
- Attendance: 943
- Site: Campus Sites (Higher Seed)
- Champions: Stony Brook (3rd title)
- Winning coach: Tobias Bischof (1st title)
- MVP: Erin O'Connor (Stony Brook)
- Broadcast: America East TV

2019 America East Conference women's soccer standings
	Conf.						Overall
Team	W		L		T	PCT	W		L		T	PCT
Stony Brook ‍†‍‡‍^{y}	6	–	1	–	1	.813	14	–	6	–	1	.690
Albany ‍†‍‍	6	–	1	–	1	.813	9	–	6	–	3	.583
Hartford ‍‍‍	5	–	2	–	1	.688	10	–	7	–	2	.579
New Hampshire ‍‍‍	5	–	3	–	0	.625	10	–	8	–	0	.556
Binghamton ‍‍‍	4	–	3	–	1	.563	10	–	6	–	2	.611
UMass Lowell ‍‍‍	3	–	4	–	1	.438	4	–	11	–	2	.294
Vermont ‍‍‍	1	–	6	–	2	.222	3	–	10	–	3	.281
Maine ‍‍‍	1	–	6	–	1	.188	5	–	8	–	1	.393
UMBC ‍‍‍	1	–	7	–	0	.125	2	–	13	–	2	.176
† – Conference champion ‡ – 2019 America East Tournament champion y – Invited to the NCAA tournament As of December 9, 2019; Rankings from United Soccer Coaches Poll; Source:America East Conference

The 2019 America East Conference women's soccer tournament was the postseason women's soccer tournament for the America East Conference held from November 3 through November 10, 2019. The five-match tournament took place at campus sites, with the higher seed hosting. The six-team single-elimination tournament consisted of three rounds based on seeding from regular season conference play. The defending champions were the Albany Great Danes, who were unable to defend their title after losing in the Quarterfinals to Hartford. Stony Brook won their second tournament in three years after a 2–1 victory in the final. It was the first victory for first year head coach Tobias Bischof.

== Bracket ==
Quarterfinals; Sunday, Nov. 3
4	New Hampshire	3
5	Binghamton	2
3	Hartford	1^{(2OT)}
6	UMass Lowell	0

Semifinals; Thursday, Nov. 7
1	Stony Brook	2
4	New Hampshire	1
2	Albany	2
3	Hartford	3

Final; Sunday, Nov. 10
1	Stony Brook	2
3	Hartford	1

== Schedule ==
=== Quarterfinals ===
November 3, 2019	#3 Hartford	1–0 (a.e.t.)	#6 UMass Lowell	West Hartford, CT
1:00 p.m.	Skylar Vitiello 104'	Report	(yellow card) 79' Courtney Coleman; (yellow card) 104' Lily Fabian	Stadium: Al-Marzook Field at Alumni Stadium; Attendance: 202; Referee: Sam Mokalled; Assistant referees: Patrick Violette; Michelle Beagan; Fourth official: Jason Dizek

November 3, 2019	#4 New Hampshire	3–2	#5 Binghamton	Durham, NH
2:00 p.m.	Kaylan Williams 27'; Ally Reynolds 56'; Julie Cane 84'	Report	36' Olivia McKnight; 84' Erin Theiller	Stadium: Wildcat Stadium; Attendance: 102; Referee: David Breckner; Assistant referees: Ernesto Rodriguez; Mounir Idmalak

=== Semifinals ===
November 7, 2019	#1 Stony Brook	2–1	#4 New Hampshire	Stony Brook, NY
6:00 p.m.	Erin O'Connor 59', 63'; Rachel Florenz (yellow card) 88'	Report	60' Kaylan Williams; (yellow card) 64' Megan Rumbold	Stadium: LaValle Stadium; Attendance: 191; Referee: Mike DeFelice; Assistant referees: Michael Ziegler; Luis Arroyo; Fourth official: Alex Casella

November 7, 2019	#2 Albany	2–3	#3 Hartford	Albany, NY
7:00 p.m.	Leah Pais 30'; Meghan Cavanaugh 47'	Report	10' Victor Jedrychowski; 15' Sierra Stone; 69' Bridgette Alexander	Stadium: Bob Ford Field; Attendance: 181; Referee: Adam Kilpatrick; Assistant referees: Thomas Snyder; Hao Zhong; Fourth official: Aaron Corman

=== Final ===
November 10, 2019	#1 Stony Brook	2–1	#3 Hartford	Stony Brook, NY
1:00 p.m.	Erin O'Connor 27'; Fanny Gotesson 71'; Anna Slang (yellow card) 86'	Report	(yellow card) 73' Skylar Vitiello; 80' Molly Socha	Stadium: LaValle Stadium; Attendance: 267; Referee: Patrick Violette; Assistant referees: Michael Ziegler; Nate Penn; Fourth official: Sean Lyons

== Statistics ==
=== Goalscorers ===
3 Goals

- Erin O'Connor (Stony Brook)

2 Goals

- Kaylan Williams (New Hampshire)

1 Goal

- Bridgette Alexander (Hartford)
- Julie Cane (New Hampshire)
- Meghan Cavanaugh (Albany)
- Fanny Gotesson (Stony Brook)
- Victor Jedrychowski (Hartford)
- Olivia McKnight (Binghamton)
- Leah Pais (Albany)
- Ally Renyolds (New Hampshire)
- Molly Socha (Hartford)
- Sierra Stone (Hartford)
- Erin Theiller (Binghamton)
- Skylar Vitiello (Hartford)

Player	Team
Olivia McKnight	Binghamton
Dunja Mostarac	UMass Lowell
Meghan Cavanaugh	Albany
Leah Pais	Albany
Caitlyn Keenan	New Hampshire
Kaylan Williams	New Hampshire
Maia Perez	Hartford
Sierra Stone	Hartford
Skylar Vitiello	Hartford
**Erin O'Connor**	Stony Brook
Fanny Gotesson	Stony Brook
Chelsie DePonte	Stony Brook
Francesca Lee	Stony Brook

MVP in bold
