= Northeast Conference women's soccer tournament =

- Sport: College soccer
- Conference: Northeast Conference
- Number of teams: 4
- Format: Single-elimination
- Current stadium: Campus sites
- Played: 1997–present
- Last contest: 2024
- Current champion: Central Connecticut (14th title)
- Most championships: Central Connecticut (14)
- Official website: northeastconference.org/wsoc

The Northeast Conference women's soccer tournament is the conference championship tournament in soccer for the Northeast Conference. In the current format, six teams compete in the single-elimination tournament, with all games being played at the home field of the higher seed. Seeding is based on regular season conference records. The winner, declared conference champion, receives the conference's automatic bid to the NCAA Division I women's soccer championship.

The tournament consisted of six teams from 1997 to 2023, but it shrunk to four teams in 2024.

== Champions ==
=== Key ===
Key

- (1) — Title number
- a.e.t. — Match went to extra time
- p – Match decided by a penalty shootout after extra time
- – Winning team also won regular season

=== By Year ===
Year	Champion	Score	Runner-up	Venue / city	MVP	Ref.
1997	Central Connecticut (1)	4–0	Monmouth	CCSU Soccer Field • New Britain, Connecticut	Jane McFarlane, Central Connecticut	
1998	Central Connecticut (2)	3–2 (a.e.t.)	UMBC	CCSU Soccer Field • New Britain, Connecticut	Lynn Lang, Central Connecticut	
1999	LIU (Note: Includes the LIU Brooklyn program, which was merged with the Division II program of the university's Post campus in July 2019, creating the current LIU program. The unified program inherited Brooklyn's Division I and NEC memberships.) (1)	1–0	Monmouth	Hesse Field • West Long Branch, New Jersey	Larissa Swartzlander, LIU	
2000	Quinnipiac (1)	1–0	Monmouth	Retriever Soccer Park • Catonsville, Maryland	Elisa Goncalves, Quinnipiac	
2001	Sacred Heart (1)	1–0	UMBC	Emmitt Field • Loretto, Pennsylvania	Leslie Konsig, Sacred Heart	
2002	Central Connecticut (3)	1–1 (5–3 p)	Monmouth	CCSU Soccer Field • New Britain, Connecticut	Kelly Shimmin, Central Connecticut	
2003	Central Connecticut (4)	0–0 (6–5 p)	Sacred Heart	North Athletic Complex • Moon Township, Pennsylvania	Sabrina Mariani, Central Connecticut	
2004	Central Connecticut (5)	1–1 (4–1 p)	Sacred Heart	University Stadium • Teaneck, New Jersey	Ashley Ferra, Central Connecticut	
2005	Central Connecticut (6)	1–0	LIU	CCSU Soccer Field • New Britain, Connecticut	Jess McCavanagh, Central Connecticut	
2006	LIU (2)	2–0	Monmouth	LIU Soccer Park • Brooklyn, New York	Christine Gans, LIU	
2007	Monmouth (1)	1–0	Sacred Heart	Hesse Field • West Long Branch, New Jersey	Lia Fierro, Monmouth	
2008	Central Connecticut (7)	1–0	LIU	LIU Soccer Park • Brooklyn, New York	Erin Herd, Central Connecticut	
2009	Monmouth (2)	1–0 (a.e.t.)	Central Connecticut	CCSU Soccer Field • New Britain, Connecticut	Mary Wilks, Monmouth	
2010	Saint Francis (PA) (1)	1–0	LIU	University Stadium • Teaneck, New Jersey	Chelsea Traurig, Saint Francis (PA)	
2011	LIU (3)	1–1 (4–3 p)	Saint Francis (PA)	Emmitt Field • Loretto, Pennsylvania	Jennifer Bannon, LIU	
2012	LIU (4)	1–0	Saint Francis (PA)	Emmitt Field • Loretto, Pennsylvania	Jessica Sexton, LIU	
2013	Saint Francis (PA) (2)	1–0	LIU	Emmitt Field • Loretto, Pennsylvania	Alecia McNiff, Saint Francis (PA)	
2014	Central Connecticut (8)	2–0	Fairleigh Dickinson	CCSU Soccer Field • New Britain, Connecticut	Charlie Branch, Central Connecticut	
2015	Fairleigh Dickinson (1)	1–0	Robert Morris	University Stadium • Teaneck, New Jersey	Rachel Hoekstra, Fairleigh Dickinson	
2016	Saint Francis (PA) (3)	2–0	Central Connecticut	Emmitt Field • Loretto, Pennsylvania	Sara Suler, Saint Francis (PA)	
2017	Saint Francis (PA) (4)	0–0 (3–2 p)	Fairleigh Dickinson	University Stadium • Teaneck, New Jersey	Gabi Morales, Saint Francis (PA)	
2018	Central Connecticut (9)	2–1	Saint Francis (PA)	CCSU Soccer Field • New Britain, Connecticut	Danielle Pearse, Central Connecticut	
2019	Central Connecticut (10)	1–0	Fairleigh Dickinson	CCSU Soccer Field • New Britain, Connecticut	Yo Tachibana, Central Connecticut	
2020	Central Connecticut (11)	4–0	LIU	CCSU Soccer Field • New Britain, Connecticut	Roma McLaughlin, Central Connecticut	
2021	Central Connecticut (12)	3–0	Fairleigh Dickinson	CCSU Soccer Field • New Britain, Connecticut	Zoe McGlynn, Central Connecticut	
2022	Fairleigh Dickinson (2)	2–2 (5–4 p)	Sacred Heart	Park Avenue Field • Fairfield, Connecticut	Lea Egner, Fairleigh Dickinson	
2023	Central Connecticut (13)	1–1 (4–3 p)	Wagner	CCSU Soccer Field • New Britain, Connecticut	Melina Ford, Central Connecticut	
2024	Howard (1)	2–1	Fairleigh Dickinson	Greene Stadium • Washington, D.C.	Melea Early, Howard	
2025	Wagner (1)	2–1 (a.e.t.)	Central Connecticut	Hameline Field • Staten Island, NY	Riley Frederick, Wagner	
2026	Central Connecticut (14)	1–1 (7–6 p)	Fairleigh Dickinson	CCSU Soccer Field • New Britain, Connecticut	Melina Ford, Central Connecticut	

=== By School ===
As of 2026 Tournament

School	W	L	T	Pct.	Finals	Titles	Winning years
Bryant	0	4	0	.000	0	0	—
Central Connecticut	23	10	5	.671	17	14	1997, 1998, 2002, 2003, 2004, 2005, 2008, 2014, 2018, 2019, 2020, 2021, 2023, 2026
Chicago State	0	0	0	–	0	0	—
Delaware State	0	0	0	–	0	0	—
Fairleigh Dickinson	10	12	3	.460	8	2	2015, 2022
Howard	3	3	0	.500	1	1	2024
Le Moyne	0	0	0	–	0	0	—
LIU (Note: Includes championships from the LIU Brooklyn program, which was merged with the Division II program of the university's Post campus in July 2019, creating the current LIU program. The unified program inherited Brooklyn's Division I and NEC memberships.)	11	10	1	.523	9	4	1999, 2006, 2011, 2012
Mercyhurst	0	0	0	–	0	0	—
Merrimack	0	1	1	.250	0	0	—
Monmouth	9	10	1	.475	7	2	2007, 2009
Mount St. Mary's	0	2	0	.000	0	0	—
New Haven	0	0	0	–	0	0	—
Quinnipiac	2	5	1	.313	1	1	2000
Robert Morris	1	1	0	.500	1	0	—
Sacred Heart	7	9	4	.450	5	1	2001
Saint Francis (PA)	8	7	4	.526	7	4	2010, 2013, 2016, 2017
Stonehill	0	2	0	.000	0	0	—
UMBC	2	2	0	.500	2	0	—
Wagner	3	3	3	.500	2	1	2025

Teams in Italics no longer sponsor women's soccer in the NEC.
