= 2021 Northeast Conference women's soccer tournament =

2019 Soccer Tournament

- Classification: Division I
- Teams: 4
- Matches: 3
- Attendance: 2,200
- Site: Central Connecticut Soccer Field; New Britain, Connecticut
- Champions: Central Connecticut (12th title)
- Winning coach: Mick D’Arcy (10th title)
- MVP: Zoe McGlynn (Central Connecticut)
- Broadcast: NEC Front Row

2021 Northeast Conference women's soccer standings
	Conf.						Overall
Team	W		L		T	PCT	W		L		T	PCT
Central Connecticut ‍†‍‡‍^{y}	8	–	2	–	0	.800	13	–	6	–	0	.684
Fairleigh Dickinson ‍‍‍	6	–	2	–	2	.700	10	–	6	–	4	.600
Sacred Heart ‍‍‍	6	–	3	–	1	.650	8	–	7	–	2	.529
Bryant ‍‍‍	6	–	4	–	0	.600	8	–	10	–	0	.444
Howard ‍‍‍	5	–	3	–	2	.600	6	–	5	–	3	.536
Wagner ‍‍‍	5	–	5	–	0	.500	8	–	10	–	0	.444
St. Francis Brooklyn ‍‍‍	3	–	4	–	3	.450	5	–	7	–	6	.444
Merrimack ‍‍‍	4	–	6	–	0	.400	5	–	11	–	2	.333
Mount St. Mary's ‍‍‍	3	–	7	–	0	.300	5	–	13	–	0	.278
Saint Francis (PA) ‍‍‍	2	–	7	–	1	.250	4	–	12	–	1	.265
LIU ‍‍‍	2	–	7	–	1	.250	2	–	11	–	2	.200
† – Conference champion ‡ – 2021 NEC Tournament champion y – Invited to the NCAA tournament As of December 7, 2021; Rankings from United Soccer Coaches Poll; Source:Northeast Conference

The 2021 Northeast Conference women's soccer tournament was the postseason women's soccer tournament for the Northeast Conference held on November 5 and 7, 2021. The three-match tournament took place at Central Connecticut Soccer Field in New Britain, Connecticut, home of the regular season champions and tournament #1 seed Central Connecticut State Blue Devils. The four-team single-elimination tournament consisted of two rounds based on seeding from regular season conference play. The defending champions were the Central Connecticut State Blue Devils, who won a tournament that was shortened to a single game in 2020 due to the COVID-19 pandemic. Central Connecticut State successfully defended their title, defeating the Fairleigh Dickinson Knights 3–0 in the final. This was the twelfth Northeast Conference tournament title for the Central Connecticut women's soccer program, ten of which have come under the direction of head coach Mick D'Arcy. This was also the fourth straight title for Central Connecticut and Mick D'Arcy. As tournament champions, Central Connecticut earned the Northeast Conference's automatic berth into the 2021 NCAA Division I Women's Soccer Tournament.

== Seeding ==
The top four teams from the 2021 regular season qualified for the 2021 Tournament. Teams were seeded based on regular season points totals, and no tiebreakers were required as each team finished on a unique points total. The top seed was the host institution for the tournament.

Seed	School	Conference Record	Points
1	Central Connecticut	8–2–0	24
2	Fairleigh Dickinson	6–2–2	22
3	Sacred Heart	6–3–1	21
4	Bryant	6–4–0	18

== Bracket ==
Semifinals; Friday, November 5
1	Central Connecticut	1
4	Bryant	0
2	Fairleigh Dickinson	5
3	Sacred Heart	3

Final; Sunday, November 7
1	Central Connecticut	3
2	Fairleigh Dickinson	0

== Schedule ==
=== Semifinals ===
November 5, 2021	#1 Central Connecticut	1–0	#4 Bryant	New Britain, Connecticut
1:00 p.m. EST	Roma McLaughlin 38'; Tess Atkinson (yellow card) 89'	Report	(yellow card) 39' Kathryn McNeil	Stadium: Central Connecticut Soccer Field; Attendance: 1,000

November 5, 2021	#2 Fairleigh Dickinson	5–3	#3 Sacred Heart	New Britain, Connecticut
4:00 p.m. EST	Christa Waterman 16', (yellow card) 59'; Naemi Hausen 30', 43'; Lea Egner 36'; Briana Esteves 55'	Report	8' Grace O'Hara; 24' Meadow Mancini; (yellow card) 47' Nichol Green; (yellow card) 52' Team; (yellow card) 59' Elyssa Kipperman; 84' Azria Malloy; (yellow card) 88' Anna Brewer	Stadium: Central Connecticut Soccer Field

=== Final ===
November 7, 2021	#1 Central Connecticut	3–0	#2 Fairleigh Dickinson	New Britain, Connecticut
1:00 p.m. ET	Roma McLaughlin 15'; Jamie Collimore 42'; Zo McGlynn 64'	Report		Stadium: Central Connecticut Soccer Field; Attendance: 1,200

== Statistics ==
=== Goalscorers ===
There were 12 goals scored in 3 matches, for an average of 4 goals per match (as of November 7, 2021).

2 goals

- Roma McLaughlin – Central Connecticut
- Naemi Hausen – Fairleigh Dickinson

1 goal

- Jamie Collimore – Central Connecticut
- Zo McGlynn – Central Connecticut
- Lea Egner – Fairleigh Dickinson
- Briana Esteves – Fairleigh Dickinson
- Christa Waterman – Fairleigh Dickinson
- Azria Malloy – Sacred Heart
- Meadow Mancini – Sacred Heart
- Grace O'Hara – Sacred Heart

== All-Tournament team ==
Player	Team
**Zoe McGlynn**	Central Connecticut
Sydnie Dorman	Central Connecticut
Roma McLaughlin	Central Connecticut
Amanda McQuillan	Central Connecticut
Lea Egner	Fairleigh Dickinson
Namie Hausen	Fairleigh Dickinson
Aitana Martinez-Montoya	Fairleigh Dickinson
Chae Diani	Bryant
Eleni Spiratos	Bryant
Desiree Crawford	Sacred Heart
Grace O'Hara	Sacred Heart

MVP in bold

== See also ==
- Northeast Conference
- 2021 NCAA Division I women's soccer season
- 2021 NCAA Division I Women's Soccer Tournament
