= 2022 Northeast Conference women's soccer tournament =

- Classification: Division I
- Teams: 6
- Matches: 5
- Attendance: 2,081
- Site: Higher Seeds
- Champions: Fairleigh Dickinson (2nd title)
- Winning coach: Eric Teepe (2nd title)
- MVP: Lea Egner (Fairleigh Dickinson)
- Broadcast: NEC Front Row

2022 Northeast Conference women's soccer standings
	Conf.						Overall
Team	W		L		T	PCT	W		L		T	PCT
CCSU ‍†‍‍	7	–	0	–	2	.889	9	–	6	–	2	.588
Merrimack ‍‍‍	6	–	2	–	1	.722	8	–	8	–	3	.500
Sacred Heart ‍‍‍	5	–	1	–	3	.722	11	–	5	–	5	.643
FDU ‍‍‡‍^{y}	5	–	2	–	2	.667	8	–	11	–	3	.432
Saint Francis (PA) ‍‍‍	5	–	3	–	1	.611	7	–	10	–	1	.417
Stonehill ‍‍‍	3	–	5	–	1	.389	4	–	13	–	1	.250
LIU ‍‍‍	2	–	5	–	2	.333	4	–	12	–	3	.289
Wagner ‍‍‍	2	–	6	–	1	.278	4	–	12	–	1	.265
Howard ‍‍‍	2	–	6	–	1	.278	3	–	11	–	2	.250
St. Francis Brooklyn ‍‍‍	1	–	8	–	0	.111	2	–	11	–	3	.219
† – Conference champion ‡ – 2022 NEC Tournament champion y – Invited to the NCAA Tournament; As of December 6, 2022; Rankings from United Soccer Coaches Poll; Source:Northeast Conference

The 2022 Northeast Conference women's soccer tournament was the postseason women's soccer tournament for the Northeast Conference held from October 30 to November 6, 2022. The three-match tournament took place at the higher seeded team in each match-up. The six-team single-elimination tournament consisted of three rounds based on seeding from regular season conference play. The defending champions were the Central Connecticut State Blue Devils. Central Connecticut State was unable to defend their title, losing to the Fairleigh Dickinson Knights 2–1 in the Semifinal. Fairleigh Dickinson went on to win the tournament over Sacred Heart in penalties in the Final. This was the second Northeast Conference tournament title for the Fairleigh Dickinson women's soccer program, both of which have come under the direction of head coach Eric Teepe. As tournament champions, Fairleigh Dickinson earned the Northeast Conference's automatic berth into the 2022 NCAA Division I Women's Soccer Tournament.

== Seeding ==
The top six teams from regular season play qualified for the 2022 Tournament. Teams were seeded based on their regular season records. Tiebreakers were used to determine seeds if teams were tied on regular season record. No tiebreakers were required as all top six teams finished with unique regular season conference records. Stonehill finished sixth in the standings, but were ineligible for post season competition due to their transition from NCAA D-II to D-I.

Seed	School	Conference Record	Points
1	Central Connecticut	7–0–2	23
2	Merrimack	6–2–1	19
3	Sacred Heart	5–1–3	18
4	Fairleigh Dickinson	5–2–2	17
5	Saint Francis (PA)	5–3–1	16
6	LIU	2–5–2	8

== Bracket ==
First Round; Sunday, Oct. 30
4	Fairleigh Dickinson	2
5	Saint Francis (PA)	1
3	Sacred Heart	5
6	LIU	0

Semifinals; Thursday, Nov. 3
1	Central Connecticut	1
4	Fairleigh Dickinson	2
2	Merrimack	1
3	Sacred Heart	2

Final; Sunday, Nov. 6
4	Fairleigh Dickinson (pen.)	2 (5)
3	Sacred Heart	2 (4)

== Schedule ==
=== First round ===
October 30, 2022	#4 Fairleigh Dickinson	2–1	#5 Saint Francis (PA)	Teaneck, NJ
12:00 p.m. ET	Leighann Kafel 17'; Aitana Martinez-Montoya (yellow card) 80'; Andrea Ougaard 86'	Report	82' Jaela House	Stadium: University Stadium; Attendance: 135; Referee: Mark Garcia; Assistant referees: George Vargas; Ernest Zielinski; Fourth official: Magda Zwierzchowiski

October 30, 2022	#3 Sacred Heart	5–0	#6 LIU	Fairfield, CT
3:30 p.m. ET	Grace O'Hara 22'; Desiree Crawford 35'; Morgan Bovardi 56'; Francesca Peloro 68'; Kelly Medeiros 68'	Report		Stadium: Park Avenue Field; Attendance: 250; Referee: Danny Marques; Assistant referees: Dianna Klodzeiy; Jason Dizek; Fourth official: Jaroslaw Werel

=== Semifinals ===
November 3, 2022	#1 Central Connecticut	1–2	#4 Fairleigh Dickinson	New Britain, CT
1:00 p.m. ET	Victoria Violette 49'; Abbie Burgess (yellow card) 80'; Delaney Lawler (yellow card) 82'	Report	54' Lea Egner; 65' Madelyn Robbins; (yellow card) 83' Mona Schlegl; (yellow card) 90' Aitana Martinez-Montoya	Stadium: Central Connecticut Soccer Field; Attendance: 311; Referee: Magda Zwierzchowski; Assistant referees: Pete Mandell; Boris Senic; Fourth official: Thomas Felice

November 3, 2022	#2 Merrimack	1–2	#3 Sacred Heart	North Andover, MA
7:00 p.m. ET	Erin Tyldesley 12'	Report	23' Nichol Green; 51' Morgan Bovardi	Stadium: Martone-Mejail Field; Attendance: 622

=== Final ===
November 6, 2022	#3 Sacred Heart	2–2 (a.e.t.) (4–5 p)	#4 Fairleigh Dickinson	Fairfield, CT
	Grace O'Hara 48', (yellow card) 110'; Nichol Green (yellow card) 85'; Morgan Bovardi 88'	Report	(yellow card) 3' Madelyn Robbins; (yellow card) 40' Mona Schlegl; 55' Kiomy Luperon; 57' Aitana Martinez-Montoya	Stadium: Park Avenue Field; Attendance: 763; Referee: Jaroslaw Werel; Assistant referees: Claudiu Badea; Thomas Felice; Fourth official: Magda Zwierzchowiski
	Penalties
	Nichol Green (penalty scored); Kelly Medeiros (penalty scored); Maria Nolan (penalty scored); Anna Ludkiewicz (penalty scored); Francesca Peloro (penalty missed)		(penalty scored) Lea Egner; (penalty scored) Aitana Martinez-Montoya; (penalty scored) Naemi Hausen; (penalty scored) Andrea Ougaard; (penalty scored) Madelyn Robbins

== Statistics ==
=== Goalscorers ===
There were 18 goals scored in 5 matches, for an average of 3.6 goals per match (as of November 6, 2022).

3 goals

- Morgan Bovardi – Sacred Heart

2 goals

- Grace O'Hara – Sacred Heart

1 goal

- Victoria Violette – Central Connecticut
- Lea Egner – Fairleigh Dickinson
- Leighann Kafel – Fairleigh Dickinson
- Kiomy Luperon – Fairleigh Dickinson
- Aitana Martinez-Montoya – Fairleigh Dickinson
- Andrea Ougaard – Fairleigh Dickinson
- Madelyn Robbins – Fairleigh Dickinson
- Erin Tyldesley – Merrimack
- Jaela House – Saint Francis (PA)
- Desiree Crawford – Sacred Heart
- Nichol Green – Sacred Heart
- Kelly Medeiros – Sacred Heart
- Francesca Peloro – Sacred Heart

== All-Tournament team ==
Player	Team
**Lea Egner**	Fairleigh Dickinson
Aitana Martinez-Montoya	Fairleigh Dickinson
Madelyn Robbins	Fairleigh Dickinson
Paula Ruess	Fairleigh Dickinson
Morgan Bovardi	Sacred Heart
Laurene Jordan	Sacred Heart
Grace O'Hara	Sacred Heart
Erin Tyldesley	Merrimack
Hallie Shiers	Merrimack
Charley Simmons	Central Connecticut
Victoria Violette	Central Connecticut

MVP in bold
