= Northeast Conference softball tournament =

American college softball tournament

- Conference softball championship
- Sport: Softball
- Conference: Northeast Conference
- Number of teams: 4
- Format: Double-elimination tournament
- Current stadium: LIU Softball Complex
- Current location: Brooklyn, New York
- Played: 1987–present
- Last contest: 2026
- Current champion: Wagner
- Most championships: LIU (15)

The Northeast Conference softball tournament (also referred to as the Northeast Tournament) is the conference championship tournament in college softball for the Northeast Conference. It is a double-elimination tournament and seeding is based on regular season records. The winner receives the conference's automatic bid to the NCAA Division I softball tournament.

== Format ==
The tournament has always used a double-elimination format. The number of teams has varied with the number of eligible members of the NEC. From 1987–1989, six teams participated. In 1990 and 1991, the field consisted of seven teams. In 1992, eight teams participated while beginning in 1993, nine teams made up the field. From 1996 through 1998, the field was set at six. Since 1999, the tournament field has consisted of the top four finishers from the regular season.

== Champions ==
=== Year-by-year ===
Year	Champion	Location	MVP
1987	Long Island	Fort Hamilton • Brooklyn, NY	Judy Gouveia, Long Island
1988	Long Island	Fort Hamilton • Brooklyn, NY	Thuy Bonagura, Long Island
1989	Long Island	Fort Hamilton • Brooklyn, NY	Natalie Jufer, Long Island
1990	Long Island	Fort Hamilton • Brooklyn, NY	Lisa Ostermann, Long Island
1991	Robert Morris	Yardley, PA	Tera Prosser, Robert Morris
1992	Robert Morris	New Britain, PA	Tera Prosser, Robert Morris
1993	Robert Morris	New Britain, PA	Heather Ferrari, Robert Morris
1994	Robert Morris	New Britain, PA	Alissa Noel, Robert Morris
1995	Rider	Staten Island, NY	Jennifer Dahl, Rider
1996	Marist	Franklin Park, PA	Michele Hudson, Marist
1997	Rider	Franklin Park, PA	Jen Dahl, Rider
1998	Robert Morris	Franklin Park, PA	Erica Schwanke, Robert Morris
1999	Long Island	Franklin Park, PA	Shannon Payne, Long Island
2000	UMBC	Brooklyn, NY	Crystal Ray, UMBC
2001	Long Island	Brooklyn, NY	Shannon Payne, Long Island
2002	UMBC	West Long Branch, NJ	Lisa Boone, UMBC
2003	Long Island	Brooklyn, NY	Crystal Eubanks, Long Island
2004	Long Island	Brooklyn, NY	Krystal Mejia, Long Island
2005	Robert Morris	Moon Township, PA	Danielle Cohen, Robert Morris
2006	Long Island	Teaneck, NJ	Jenny Giles, Long Island
2007	Long Island	Teaneck, NJ	Jenny Giles, Long Island
2008	Long Island	Brooklyn, NY	Blaire Porter, Long Island
2009	Sacred Heart	Queens, NY	Jen Russell, Sacred Heart
2010	Long Island	Teaneck, NJ	Brynn Lewis, Long Island
2011	Sacred Heart	Moon Township, PA	Jen Russell, Sacred Heart
2012	Long Island	Moon Township, PA	Sterling Hoham, Long Island
2013	Central Connecticut	Moon Township, PA	Laura Messina, Central Connecticut
2014	Bryant	Smithfield, RI	Elle Madsen, Bryant
2015	Central Connecticut	Moon Township, PA	Kat Malcolm, Central Connecticut
2016	LIU Brooklyn	Brooklyn, NY	Erynn Sobieski, LIU Brooklyn
2017	Saint Francis	Loretto, PA	Sierra McKee, Saint Francis
2018	Saint Francis	Loretto, PA	Adrian Smith, Saint Francis
2019	Saint Francis	Brooklyn, NY	Christina Clark, Saint Francis
2020	Canceled due to the COVID-19 pandemic.		
2021	Saint Francis	Loretto, PA	Grace Vesco, Saint Francis
2022	Saint Francis	Loretto, PA	Grace Vesco, Saint Francis
2023	LIU (Note: All NEC championships and games won by LIU from 2021–2024 were vacated in accordance with NCAA sanctions.)	Loretto, PA	Camryn Lyman, LIU
2024	Saint Francis	Loretto, PA	Lexi Hernandez, Saint Francis
2025	Saint Francis	Brooklyn, NY	Savannah Nash, Saint Francis
2026	Wagner	LIU Softball Complex • Brooklyn, NY	Sydnie Trujillo, Wagner

=== By school ===
School	Championships	Years
LIU	15	1987, 1988, 1989, 1990, 1999, 2001, 2003, 2004, 2006, 2007, 2008, 2010, 2012, 2016, 2023
Saint Francis	7	2017, 2018, 2019, 2021, 2022, 2024, 2025
Robert Morris	6	1991, 1992, 1993, 1994, 1998, 2005
Central Connecticut	2	2013, 2015
Rider	2	1995, 1997
Sacred Heart	2	2009, 2011
UMBC	2	2000, 2002
Bryant	1	2014
Marist	1	1996
Wagner	1	2026

Italics indicates the school currently does not sponsor softball in the NEC.
