= 2017 Northeast Conference women's soccer tournament =

- Classification: Division I
- Teams: 4
- Matches: 3
- Attendance: 588
- Site: University Stadium; Teaneck, New Jersey
- Champions: Saint Francis (4th title)
- Winning coach: Brenda van Stralen (4th title)

2017 Northeast Conference women's soccer standings
	Conf.						Overall
Team	W		L		T	PCT	W		L		T	PCT
Fairleigh Dickinson † ‍‍‍	6	–	1	–	1	.813	9	–	8	–	4	.524
Saint Francis (PA) ‍†‍‡‍^{y}	6	–	1	–	1	.813	10	–	8	–	3	.548
Central Connecticut ‍‍‍	6	–	2	–	0	.750	10	–	8	–	0	.556
Bryant ‍‍‍	5	–	3	–	0	.625	11	–	5	–	2	.667
Sacred Heart ‍‍‍	4	–	4	–	0	.500	7	–	11	–	0	.389
Robert Morris ‍‍‍	4	–	4	–	0	.500	6	–	11	–	0	.353
Mount St. Mary's ‍‍‍	2	–	6	–	0	.250	5	–	12	–	1	.306
LIU Brooklyn ‍‍‍	1	–	6	–	1	.188	3	–	12	–	2	.235
Wagner ‍‍‍	0	–	7	–	1	.063	3	–	12	–	3	.250
† – Conference champion ‡ – 2017 NEC Tournament champion y – Invited to the NCAA tournament As of November 11, 2017; Rankings from United Soccer Coaches Poll; Source:Northeast Conference

The 2017 Northeast Conference women's soccer tournament was the postseason women's soccer tournament for the Northeast Conference held on November 3 and 5, 2017. The three-match tournament took place at University Stadium in Teaneck, New Jersey, home of the regular season co-champions and tournament #1 seed Fairleigh Dickinson Knights. The four-team single-elimination tournament consisted of two rounds based on seeding from regular season conference play. The defending champions were the Saint Francis Red Flash and they successfully defended their title, winning the penalty shoot-out tiebreaking procedure following a tie with Fairleigh Dickinson in the final. This was the fourth Northeast Conference tournament title for the Saint Francis women's soccer program, all of which have come under the direction of head coach Brenda van Stralen.

== Bracket ==
Semifinals; Friday, November 3
1	Fairleigh Dickinson	2
4	Bryant	1
2	Saint Francis	2
3	Central Connecticut	1

Final; Sunday, November 5
1	Fairleigh Dickinson	0 (2)
2	Saint Francis	0 (3)

== Schedule ==
=== Semifinals ===
November 3, 2017	#1 Fairleigh Dickinson	2–1	#4 Bryant	Teaneck, New Jersey
11:00 a.m. EDT	Kristine Neri 48'; Jessi Reinhardt 65'	Report	37' Kylie Ratelle	Stadium: University Stadium; Referee: Jaroslaw Werel; Assistant referees: Magda Zwierzchowski; Pete Mandell; Fourth official: Teri Connor

November 3, 2017	#2 Saint Francis	2–1	#3 Central Connecticut	Teaneck, New Jersey
2:00 p.m. EDT	Mariana Jaleca 56'; Gabi Morales 66'	Report	84' Jenna Rae Covello	Stadium: University Stadium; Attendance: 377; Referee: Ken Heller; Assistant referees: Danny Marques; Teri Connor; Fourth official: Magda Zwierzchowski

=== Final ===
November 5, 2017	#1 Fairleigh Dickinson	0–0 (a.e.t.) (2–3 p)	#2 Saint Francis	Teaneck, New Jersey
12:00 p.m. EST		Report		Stadium: University Stadium; Attendance: 211; Referee: Adam Wienckowski; Assistant referees: Teri Connor; Magda Zwierzchowski; Fourth official: Jaroslaw Werel
	Penalties
	Dara Battistoni (penalty missed); Jessi Reinhardt (penalty scored); Viktorija Miseljic (penalty scored); Elma Kolenovic (penalty missed); Grit Broening (penalty missed)		(penalty missed) Shannon McGinnis; (penalty scored) Mariana Jaleca; (penalty scored) Jessica Keller; (penalty scored) Dakota Graham; (penalty missed) Natalie Spangler

== Statistics ==
=== Goalscorers ===
1 Goal

- Jenna Rae Covello - Central Connecticut
- Mariana Jaleca - St. Francis
- Gabi Morales - St. Francis
- Kristine Neri - Fairleigh Dickinson
- Kylie Ratelle - Bryant
- Jessi Reinhardt - Fairleigh Dickinson

== See also ==
- Northeast Conference
- 2017 NCAA Division I women's soccer season
- 2017 NCAA Division I Women's Soccer Tournament
- 2017 Northeast Conference Men's Soccer Tournament
