= 2023 Northeast Conference women's soccer tournament =

- Classification: Division I
- Teams: 6
- Matches: 5
- Attendance: 2,970
- Site: Campus Sites, Hosted by Higher Seed
- Champions: Central Connecticut (13th title)
- Winning coach: Mick D'Arcy (11th title)
- MVP: Melina Ford (Central Connecticut)
- Broadcast: ESPN+

2023 Northeast Conference women's soccer standings
| | Conf. | | | | | | Overall |
| Team | W | | L | | T | PCT | W | | L | | T | PCT |
|---|---|---|---|---|---|---|---|---|---|---|---|---|
| Merrimack ‍†‍‍ | 8 | – | 1 | – | 1 | .850 | 10 | – | 4 | – | 4 | .667 |
| Central Connecticut ‍‍‡‍^{y} | 7 | – | 0 | – | 3 | .850 | 10 | – | 5 | – | 5 | .625 |
| Fairleigh Dickinson ‍‍‍ | 8 | – | 2 | – | 0 | .800 | 8 | – | 11 | – | 0 | .421 |
| Howard ‍‍‍ | 6 | – | 3 | – | 1 | .650 | 12 | – | 6 | – | 2 | .650 |
| Sacred Heart ‍‍‍ | 5 | – | 4 | – | 1 | .550 | 6 | – | 9 | – | 4 | .421 |
| Wagner ‍‍‍ | 5 | – | 5 | – | 0 | .500 | 8 | – | 8 | – | 4 | .500 |
| Saint Francis (PA) ‍‍‍ | 3 | – | 5 | – | 2 | .400 | 3 | – | 12 | – | 2 | .235 |
| LIU ‍‍‍ | 3 | – | 6 | – | 1 | .350 | 7 | – | 8 | – | 2 | .471 |
| Stonehill ‍‍‍ | 2 | – | 6 | – | 2 | .300 | 2 | – | 13 | – | 3 | .194 |
| Le Moyne ‍‍‍ | 1 | – | 7 | – | 2 | .200 | 2 | – | 12 | – | 4 | .222 |
| Delaware State ‍‍‍ | 0 | – | 9 | – | 1 | .050 | 0 | – | 15 | – | 1 | .031 |
† – Conference champion ‡ – 2023 NEC Tournament champion y – Invited to the NCAA Tournament; As of December 5, 2023; Rankings from United Soccer Coaches Poll; Source: Northeast Conference

The 2023 Northeast Conference women's soccer tournament was the postseason women's soccer tournament for the Northeast Conference held from October 29 to November 5, 2023. The five-match tournament took place at campus sites, with the higher seed hosting matches. The host for the matches was determined by seeding from regular season play. The six-team single-elimination tournament consisted of three rounds based on seeding from regular season conference play. The defending champions were the Fairleigh Dickinson Knights. Fairleigh Dickinson was unable to defend their title, losing to Wagner in the First Round. Central Connecticut went on to win the tournament over Wagner in penalties in the Final. This was the thirteenth Northeast Conference tournament title for the Central Connecticut women's soccer program, eleven of which have come under the direction of head coach Mick D'Arcy. This marks the fifth NEC title in six years for Central Connecticut. As tournament champions, Central Connecticut earned the Northeast Conference's automatic berth into the 2023 NCAA Division I Women's Soccer Tournament.

== Seeding ==
The top six teams from regular season play qualified for the 2023 Tournament. Teams were seeded based on their regular season records. Tiebreakers were used to determine seeds if teams were tied on regular season record. A tiebreaker was required to determine the second and third seeds as Central Connecticut and Fairleigh Dickinson finished the regular season tied with 24 points each. Central Connecticut won the regular season meeting between the two teams 2–1 on September 24 and was therefore the second seed. Fairleigh Dickinson would have to play in the First Round as the third seed.

| Seed | School | Conference Record | Points |
|---|---|---|---|
| 1 | Merrimack | 8–1–1 | 25 |
| 2 | Central Connecticut | 7–0–3 | 24 |
| 3 | Fairleigh Dickinson | 8–2–0 | 24 |
| 4 | Howard | 6–3–1 | 22 |
| 5 | Sacred Heart | 5–4–1 | 16 |
| 6 | Wagner | 5–5–0 | 15 |

== Bracket ==
First Round; Sunday, Oct. 29
4 | Howard | 1
5 | Sacred Heart | 0
3 | Fairleigh Dickinson | 0
6 | Wagner | 3

Semifinals; Thursday, Nov. 2
1 | Merrimack | 1 (1)
6 | Wagner (pen.) | 1 (3)
2 | Central Connecticut (a.e.t.) | 2
4 | Howard | 1

Final; Sunday, Nov. 5
2 | Central Connecticut (pen.) | 1 (4)
6 | Wagner | 1 (3)

Note: Teams were re-seeded after the First Round.

== Schedule ==
=== First round ===
| October 29 | #3 Fairleigh Dickinson | 0–3 | #6 Wagner | Teaneck, NJ |
| 12:00 p.m. ET | | Report | 15' Madison Carr; 24' Jess Maraia; 33' Olivia Rubbo | Stadium: University Stadium; Attendance: 243; Referee: Danny Marques; Assistant referees: Pete Mandell; Kyle O'Grady; Fourth official: Jaroslaw Werel |

| October 29 | #4 Howard | 1–0 | #5 Sacred Heart | Washington, D.C. |
| 9:00 p.m. ET | Marli Berry 31', (yellow card) 87'; Asia Mickens-Perez (yellow card) 79' | Report | (yellow card) 45' Nichol Green | Stadium: Greene Stadium; Attendance: 211; Referee: Ben Pilgrim; Assistant referees: Susan Walton; Inga Maric; Fourth official: Mark Remsa |

=== Semifinals ===
| November 2 | #2 Central Connecticut | 2–1 (a.e.t.) | #4 Howard | New Britain, CT |
| 6:00 p.m. ET | Katarzyna Zawadzki (yellow card) 57'; Aoife Horgan 88' (pen.); Daniela De Souza 102' | Report | (yellow card) 30' Zoe Moore; 57' Mia Young; (yellow card) 69' Nyla Allen; (yellow card) 88' Marli Berry | Stadium: CCSU Soccer Field; Attendance: 622 |

| November 2 | #1 Merrimack | 1–1 (a.e.t.) (1–3 p) | #6 Wagner | Andover, MA |
| 7:00 p.m. ET | Isabella Keogh 77' | Report | 90' Kayla Barbosa | Stadium: Martone-Mejail Field; Attendance: 781; Referee: Luis Reis; Assistant referees: Claudiu Badea; Nicola Vesia; Fourth official: Leah Hayes |
| | Penalties |
| | Abigail Cieri (penalty missed); Ella Cormier (penalty scored); Emma Rogorzenski (penalty missed); Sydney Haskin (penalty missed) | | (penalty scored) Sara Wiedeman; (penalty scored) Kylie McNally; (penalty missed) Jess Maraia; (penalty scored) Juliana Rafaniello |

=== Final ===
| November 5 | #2 Central Connecticut | 1–1 (a.e.t.) (4–3 p) | #6 Wagner | New Britain, CT |
| 1:00 p.m. ET | Giavanna Inzerillo 104' | Report | (yellow card) 25', (goal) 110' Kayla Barbosa; (yellow card) 56' Jess Maraia; (yellow card) 95' Juliana Rafaniello; (yellow card) 104' (yellow-red card) 104' Team | Stadium: CCSU Soccer Field; Attendance: 1,113; Referee: Alexandria Focea; Assistant referees: Claudiu Badea; Inga Maric |
| | Penalties |
| | Aoife Horgan (penalty scored); Sabrina Krause (penalty scored); Victoria Violette (penalty scored); Kiley Yepes (penalty missed); Gia Edwards (penalty scored) | | (penalty scored) Sara Wiedeman; (penalty missed) Kylie McNally; (penalty scored) Alana Goldsmith; (penalty scored) Juliana Rafaniello; (penalty missed) Madison Carr |

== Statistics ==
=== Goalscorers ===
There were 11 goals scored in 5 matches, for an average of 2.2 goals per match (as of November 5, 2023).

2 goals

- Kayla Barbosa – Wagner

1 goal

- Daniela De Souza – Central Connecticut
- Aoife Horgan – Central Connecticut
- Giavanna Inzerillo – Central Connecticut
- Marli Berry – Howard
- Mia Young – Howard
- Isabella Keogh – Merrimack
- Madison Carr – Wagner
- Jess Maraia – Wagner
- Olivia Rubbo – Wagner

== All-Tournament team ==
| Player | Team |
|---|---|
| Abbie Burgess | Central Connecticut |
| **Melina Ford** | Central Connecticut |
| Nicolle Santos | Central Connecticut |
| Victoria Violette | Central Connecticut |
| Melea Earley | Howard |
| Trinity Knox | Howard |
| Caroline Howland | Merrimack |
| Isabella Keogh | Merrimack |
| Kayla Barbosa | Wagner |
| Sam Hughes | Wagner |
| Juliana Rafaniello | Wagner |

MVP in bold
