= 2026 Northeast Conference softball tournament =

College softball tournament in New York

- Teams: 4
- Format: Double-elimination tournament
- Finals site: LIU Softball Complex; Brooklyn, New York
- Champions: Wagner (1st title)
- Winning coach: Glenn Moore (1st title)
- MVP: Sydnie Trujillo (Wagner)
- Television: ESPN+

2026 Northeast Conference softball standings
	Conf.						Overall
Team	W		L		T	PCT	W		L		T	PCT
LIU ‍†‍‍	21	–	3	–	0	.875	25	–	31	–	0	.446
Central Connecticut ‍‍‍	20	–	4	–	0	.833	27	–	20	–	0	.574
Wagner ‍‍‡‍^{y}	14	–	10	–	0	.583	21	–	27	–	0	.438
Le Moyne* ‍‍‍	12	–	12	–	0	.500	16	–	35	–	0	.314
Fairleigh Dickinson ‍‍‍	11	–	13	–	0	.458	20	–	32	–	0	.385
Stonehill ‍‍‍	9	–	15	–	0	.375	13	–	37	–	0	.260
New Haven* ‍‍‍	8	–	16	–	0	.333	10	–	35	–	0	.222
Mercyhurst* ‍‍‍	8	–	16	–	0	.333	9	–	34	–	0	.209
Saint Francis (PA) ‍‍‍	5	–	19	–	0	.208	5	–	42	–	1	.115
* ineligible for the 2025 NCAA tournament due to transition from Division II
† – Conference champion ‡ – Tournament champion y – Invited to the NCAA tournament As of May 17, 2026; Rankings from NFCA/USA Today

The 2026 Northeast Conference softball tournament was held at LIU Softball Complex on the campus of Long Island University in Brooklyn, New York from May 7 through May 9, 2026. The tournament was won by the Wagner, who earned the Northeast Conference's automatic bid to the 2026 NCAA Division I softball tournament.

== Format and seeding ==
The top four teams from the conference's round-robin regular season will qualify for the tournament, and will be seeded one through four. They will play a double-elimination tournament.

== Tournament ==
Upper round 1
1	LIU	7
4	Le Moyne	2
2	Central Connecticut	1
3	Wagner	3
Lower round 1
4	Le Moyne	0
2	Central Connecticut	8^{(5)}

Upper final
1	LIU	6
3	Wagner	8
Lower final
1	LIU	0
2	Central Connecticut	7

Final
3	Wagner	5	—
2	Central Connecticut	4	—

== All Tournament Team ==
Player	Team
**Sydnie Trujillo**	Wagner
Leilani Gonzales	Wagner
Samantha Lotus	Wagner
Karson Zavala	Wagner
Stella Gasper	Central Connecticut
Grace Lawton	Central Connecticut
Hailey Strunk	Central Connecticut
Lil Hinkle	LIU
Devon Medina	LIU
Avery Linn	Le Moyne

MVP in bold
