= 2025 Northeast Conference women's soccer tournament =

- Classification: Division I
- Teams: 4
- Matches: 3
- Attendance: 1,791
- Site: Campus Sites, Hosted by Higher Seed
- Champions: Wagner (1st title)
- Winning coach: Phil Casella (1st title)
- MVP: Riley Frederick (Wagner)
- Broadcast: ESPN+ (Final)

2025 Northeast Conference women's soccer standings
| | Conf. | | | | | | Overall |
| Team | W | | L | | T | PCT | W | | L | | T | PCT |
|---|---|---|---|---|---|---|---|---|---|---|---|---|
| FDU ‍†‍‍ | 9 | – | 0 | – | 2 | .909 | 9 | – | 6 | – | 5 | .575 |
| Wagner ‍‍‡‍^{y} | 8 | – | 1 | – | 2 | .818 | 11 | – | 3 | – | 6 | .700 |
| Howard ‍‍‍ | 7 | – | 2 | – | 2 | .727 | 9 | – | 7 | – | 3 | .553 |
| Central Connecticut ‍‍‍ | 6 | – | 1 | – | 4 | .727 | 7 | – | 6 | – | 5 | .528 |
| Stonehill ‍‍‍ | 6 | – | 3 | – | 2 | .636 | 6 | – | 8 | – | 4 | .444 |
| LIU ‍‍‍ | 5 | – | 3 | – | 3 | .591 | 7 | – | 5 | – | 5 | .559 |
| Delaware State ‍‍‍ | 4 | – | 6 | – | 1 | .409 | 6 | – | 10 | – | 3 | .395 |
| Chicago State ‍‍‍ | 3 | – | 6 | – | 2 | .364 | 5 | – | 9 | – | 5 | .395 |
| Mercyhurst ^{#} ‍‍‍ | 3 | – | 6 | – | 2 | .364 | 3 | – | 13 | – | 3 | .237 |
| Le Moyne ^{#} ‍‍‍ | 2 | – | 6 | – | 3 | .318 | 2 | – | 13 | – | 4 | .211 |
| Saint Francis (PA) ‍‍‍ | 0 | – | 9 | – | 2 | .091 | 0 | – | 14 | – | 4 | .111 |
| New Haven ^{#} ‍‍‍ | 0 | – | 10 | – | 1 | .045 | 0 | – | 15 | – | 1 | .031 |
† – Conference champion ‡ – 2025 NEC Tournament champion y – Invited to the NCAA Tournament^{#} – Ineligible for post-season (In transition); As of December 9, 2025; Rankings from United Soccer Coaches Poll; Source:Northeast Conference

The 2025 Northeast Conference women's soccer tournament was the postseason women's soccer tournament for the Northeast Conference held from November 6 to November 9, 2025. The three-match tournament took place at campus sites, with the higher seed hosting matches. The host for the matches was determined by seeding from regular season play. The four-team single-elimination tournament consisted of two rounds based on seeding from regular season conference play. The defending champions were the Howard Bison. Howard was unable to defend their title, falling in the Semifinals to Wagner. Wagner went on to win the tournament over Central Connecticut in the Final, 2–1, after extra time. This was the first Northeast Conference tournament title for the Wagner women's soccer program, and first for head coach Phil Casella. As tournament champions, Wagner earned the Northeast Conference's automatic berth into the 2025 NCAA Division I women's soccer tournament.

== Seeding ==
The top four teams from regular season play qualified for the 2025 Tournament. Teams were seeded based on their regular season records. Tiebreakers were used to determine seeds if teams were tied on regular season record. No tiebreakers were required as the top five teams finished with unique regular season conference records.

| Seed | School | Conference Record | Points |
|---|---|---|---|
| 1 | Fairleigh Dickinson | 9–0–2 | 29 |
| 2 | Wagner | 8–1–2 | 26 |
| 3 | Howard | 7–2–2 | 23 |
| 4 | Central Connecticut | 6–1–4 | 22 |

== Bracket ==
Semifinals; Thursday, Nov. 6
1 | Fairleigh Dickinson | 0
4 | Central Connecticut | 1
2 | Wagner (a.e.t.) | 3
3 | Howard | 2

Final; Sunday, Nov. 9
4 | Central Connecticut | 1
2 | Wagner (a.e.t.) | 2

== Schedule ==
=== Semifinals ===
| November 6 | (1) Fairleigh Dickinson | 0–1 | (4) Central Connecticut | Teaneck, NJ |
| 4:00 p.m. EST | | Report | 52' Kayla Ward; (yellow card) 57' Team | Stadium: University Stadium; Attendance: 339; Referee: Andrea Pileri; Assistant referees: Christopher Muhs; Jaroslaw Werel; Fourth official: Gurhan Dolgun |

| November 6 | (2) Wagner | 3–2 (a.e.t.) | (3) Howard | Staten Island, NY |
| 7:00 p.m. EST | Alana Goldsmith 56'; Anayah Rivera 89'; Caroline Kessler (yellow card) 97'; Izzy Gomez 106' | Report | 37' Alauna Rutland; 57' Asia Mickens-Perez; (yellow card) 78' Bre'Elle Dean | Stadium: Wagner College Stadium; Attendance: 734; Referee: Danny Marques; Assistant referees: Kenneth Heller; Will Manning; Fourth official: Arun Kadam |

=== Final ===
| November 9 | (2) Wagner | 2–1 (a.e.t.) | (4) Central Connecticut | Staten Island, NY |
| 1:00 p.m. EST | Deirdre Meberg 58'; Riley Frederick 104' | Report | 9' Kiley Yepes; (yellow card) 89' Emma Radoncic | Stadium: Wagner College Stadium; Attendance: 718; Referee: Brian Dunn; Assistant referees: Inga Maric; Maria Gigante; Fourth official: Jaroslaw Werel |

== Statistics ==
=== Goalscorers ===
There were 9 goals scored in 3 matches, for an average of 3 goals per match (as of November 9, 2025).

1 goal

- Kayla Ward – Central Connecticut
- Kiley Yepes – Central Connecticut
- Asia Mickens-Perez – Howard
- Alauna Rutland – Howard
- Riley Frederick – Wagner
- Alana Goldsmith – Wagner
- Izzy Gomez – Wagner
- Deirdre Meberg – Wagner
- Anayah Rivera – Wagner

== All-Tournament team ==
| Player | Team |
|---|---|
| Isabella Cambio | Central Connecticut |
| Leah Howe | Central Connecticut |
| Stella Orellana | Central Connecticut |
| Laura Martinez | Fairleigh Dickinson |
| Ana Salas | Fairleigh Dickinson |
| Maya Blackston | Howard |
| Rachel Suttle | Howard |
| **Riley Frederick** | Wagner |
| Izzy Gomez | Wagner |
| Hailey Knapp | Wagner |
| Anayah Rivera | Wagner |

MVP in bold
