= St. Francis Brooklyn Terriers women's soccer =

College soccer team in New York, U.S.

St. Francis Brooklyn Terriers
- Founded: 2019
- Folded: 2023
- University: St. Francis College
- Location: Brooklyn, New York, US
- Stadium: Brooklyn Bridge Park, Pier 5 (capacity: 1,200)
- Nickname: Terriers
- Colors: Royal blue and red
Home	Away

The St. Francis Terriers women's soccer team represented St. Francis College, which is located in Brooklyn Heights, New York. The team was a member of the Division I Northeast Conference (NEC). The Terriers played their home games at the Brooklyn Bridge Park on Pier 5.

== History ==
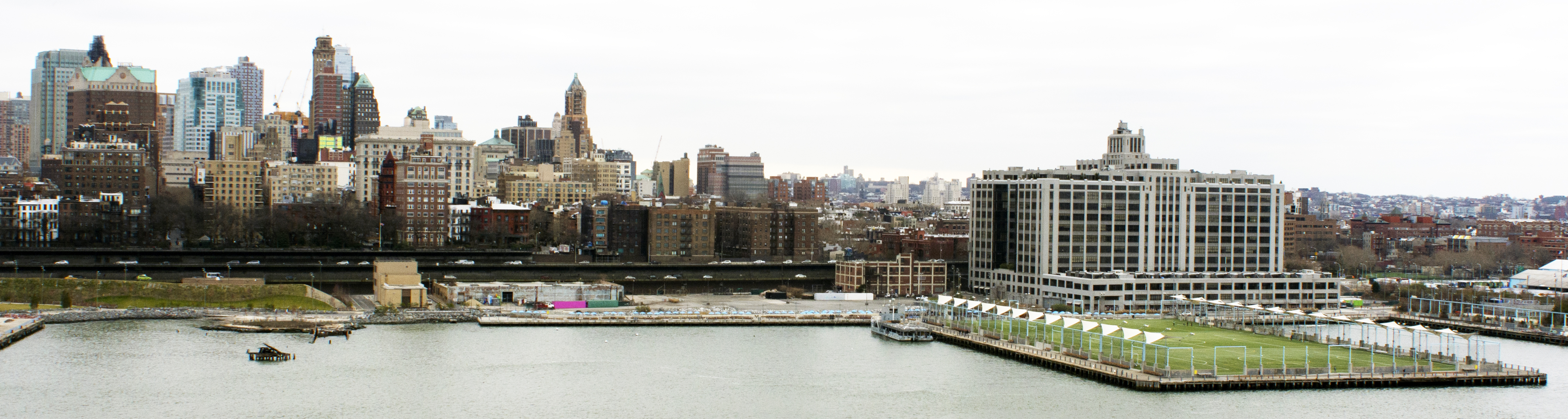
View of Brooklyn Bridge Park Pier 5, home of the Terriers, from the East River. The field is located on the lower right portion of the image.

Inaugural head coach Justine Lombardi joined the Terriers in 2018 as the first coach in program history. Prior to joining the Terriers, she was an assistant coach for six seasons at her alma mater, Quinnipiac. She spent her first year recruiting and in 2019 will field the inaugural Terriers squad.

The program's first game was played against Lafayette at Brooklyn Bridge Park on August 22, 2019. The Terriers lost in overtime 0–1 against the Leopards. The Terriers first goal was scored by Henriette Lykke, against the Iona Gaels on September 18, 2019, in a 2–3 loss. In their inaugural season, the Terriers did not win a game and posted a 0–17–0 record.

== Seasons ==
St. Francis Brooklyn Terriers
Season	Head coach	Season results			Tournament results	
Season	Head coach	Overall	Conference		Conference	NCAA
Season	Head coach	Record	Record	Finish	Conference	NCAA
2019	Justine Lombardi	0–17–0	0–10–0	11th	DNQ	—
2020	Justine Lombardi	0–0–0	0–0–0	—	—	—
2 Seasons		0–17–0	0–10–0			
Legend
Conference regular season champion Conference tournament champion Conference regular season and conference tournament champion Post-season tournament invitation Post-season tournament champion NCAA national champion

== Terrier records ==
St. Francis College Records
	Season	Career
Goals		
Points		
Assists		
Saves		
Shutouts		

== Record vs. NEC opponents ==
St. Francis Brooklyn vs.	Overall Record
Bryant	0–1–0
Central Connecticut	0–1–0
Fairleigh Dickinson	0–1–0
LIU	0–1–0
Merrimack	0–1–0
Mount St. Mary's	0–1–0
Robert Morris	0–1–0
Sacred Heart	0–1–0
Saint Francis (PA)	0–1–0
Wagner	0–1–0
*As of November 4, 2019. Does not count NEC Tournament games.
