= 2024 Northeast Conference women's soccer tournament =

- Classification: Division I
- Teams: 4
- Matches: 3
- Attendance: 692
- Site: Campus Sites, Hosted by Higher Seed
- Champions: Howard (1st title)
- Winning coach: Brent Leiba (1st title)
- MVP: Melea Early (Howard)
- Broadcast: ESPN+

2024 Northeast Conference women's soccer standings
	Conf.						Overall
Team	W		L		T	PCT	W		L		T	PCT
Howard ‍†‍‡‍^{y}	8	–	1	–	1	.850	11	–	5	–	5	.643
Wagner ‍‍‍	7	–	1	–	2	.800	8	–	5	–	6	.579
FDU ‍‍‍	7	–	2	–	1	.750	8	–	6	–	6	.550
Stonehill ‍‍‍	7	–	2	–	1	.750	8	–	10	–	1	.447
Central Connecticut ‍‍‍	5	–	4	–	1	.550	5	–	10	–	2	.353
Saint Francis (PA) ‍‍‍	4	–	5	–	1	.450	6	–	9	–	3	.417
LIU ‍‍‍	4	–	5	–	1	.450	5	–	10	–	1	.344
Mercyhurst ‍‍‍	3	–	4	–	3	.450	4	–	11	–	4	.316
Le Moyne ‍‍‍	1	–	7	–	2	.200	2	–	15	–	2	.158
Chicago State ‍‍‍	1	–	7	–	2	.200	1	–	13	–	2	.125
Delaware State ‍‍‍	0	–	9	–	1	.050	0	–	17	–	1	.028
† – Conference champion ‡ – 2024 NEC Tournament champion y – Invited to the NCAA Tournament; As of December 10, 2024; Rankings from United Soccer Coaches Poll; Source:Northeast Conference

The 2024 Northeast Conference women's soccer tournament was the postseason women's soccer tournament for the Northeast Conference held from November 7 to November 10, 2024. The three-match tournament took place at campus sites, with the higher seed hosting matches. The host for the matches was determined by seeding from regular season play. The four-team single-elimination tournament consisted of two rounds based on seeding from regular season conference play. The defending champions were the Central Connecticut Blue Devils. Central Connecticut was unable to defend their title, not qualifying for the tournament after finishing fifth in the regular season standings. Howard went on to win the tournament over Fairleigh Dickinson in the Final, 2–1. This was the first Northeast Conference tournament title for the Howard women's soccer program, and first for head coach Brent Leiba. As tournament champions, Howard earned the Northeast Conference's automatic berth into the 2024 NCAA Division I Women's Soccer Tournament.

== Seeding ==
The top four teams from regular season play qualified for the 2024 Tournament. Teams were seeded based on their regular season records. Tiebreakers were used to determine seeds if teams were tied on regular season record. A tiebreaker was required to determine the third and fourth seeds in the tournament as Fairleigh Dickinson and Stonehill both finished with 7–2–1 regular season conference records. The teams met on October 17 during the regular season, and defeated Stonehill 2–0. Therefore, Fairleigh Dickinson earned the third seed and Stonehill was the fourth seed.

Seed	School	Conference Record	Points
1	Howard	8–1–1	25
2	Wagner	7–1–2	23
3	Fairleigh Dickinson	7–2–1	22
4	Stonehill	7–2–1	22

== Bracket ==
Semifinals; Thursday, Nov. 7
1	Howard	2
4	Stonehill	1
2	Wagner	0
3	Fairleigh Dickinson	3

Final; Sunday, Nov. 10
1	Howard	2
3	Fairleigh Dickinson	1

== Schedule ==
=== Semifinals ===
November 7, 2024	#1 Howard	2–1	#4 Stonehill	Washington, D.C.
12:00 p.m. EST	Melea Early 6', 26'	Report	39' Annie Renz; (yellow card) 53' Erin Foley; (yellow card) 89' Grace Caso	Stadium: Greene Stadium; Attendance: 289

November 7, 2024	#2 Wagner	0–3	#3 Fairleigh Dickinson	Staten Island, NY
7:00 p.m. EST		Report	31' Marina Burzaco; 71' Kiomy Luperon; 85' Elena Cvetkovic	Stadium: Wagner College Stadium; Attendance: 403

=== Final ===
November 10, 2024	#1 Howard	2–1	#3 Fairleigh Dickinson	Washington, D.C.
12:00 p.m. EST	Samantha James 43'; Kyra Bolden 53'; Laila Cowsette (yellow card) 59'	Report	53' Marina Burzaco; (yellow card) 70' Alyssa Moreira	Stadium: Greene Stadium

== Statistics ==
=== Goalscorers ===
There were 9 goals scored in 3 matches, for an average of 3 goals per match (as of November 10, 2024).

2 goals

- Marina Burzaco – Fairleigh Dickinson
- Melea Early – Howard

1 goal

- Kyra Bolden – Howard
- Elena Cvetkovic – Fairleigh Dickinson
- Samantha James – Howard
- Kiomy Luperon – Fairleigh Dickinson
- Annie Renz – Stonehill

== All-Tournament team ==
Player	Team
Marina Burzaco	Fairleigh Dickinson
Laura Martinez	Fairleigh Dickinson
Mona Schlegl	Fairleigh Dickinson
Kyra Bolden	Howard
**Melea Early**	Howard
Savannah Hersh	Howard
Trinity Knox	Howard
Emma Dumareaq	Stonehill
Yara Fawaz	Stonehill
Kayla Barbosa	Wagner
Kylie McNally	Wagner

MVP in bold
