= Dan Pirillo =

American baseball player and coach

Current position
- Title: Head coach
- Team: LIU
- Conference: Northeast
- Record: 252–232 (.521)

Biographical details
- Born: October 15, 1985 (age 41); Marlboro, New York
- Education: LIU Brooklyn

Playing career
- 2005–2008: LIU Brooklyn
- Position: Utility

Coaching career (HC unless noted)
- 2009–2011: LIU Brooklyn (assistant)
- 2012: Georgia College (assistant)
- 2013–2016: Chicago State (assistant)
- 2017–present: LIU

Head coaching record
- Overall: 252–232 (.521)
- Tournaments: NCAA: 0–8

Accomplishments and honors

Championships
- 3 NEC (2022, 2025, 2026); 4 NEC Tournament (2018, 2022, 2024, 2026)

Daniel Thomas Pirillo (born October 15, 1985) is an American college baseball coach and former utility player. He is head baseball coach at Long Island University. He played college baseball for the LIU Brooklyn Blackbirds from 2005 to 2008 under head coach Don Maines.

== Head coaching record ==
Record table
Season	Team	Overall	Conference	Standing	Postseason
LIU Brooklyn Blackbirds/LIU Sharks (Northeast Conference) (2017–present)
2017	LIU Brooklyn	22–28	12–14	5th	
2018	LIU Brooklyn	31–24	16–12	3rd	NCAA Regional
2019	LIU Brooklyn	20–33	10–14	5th	
2020	LIU	5–5	0–0		Season canceled due to COVID-19
2021	LIU	20–15	18–11	4th	Northeast tournament
2022	LIU	37–21	18–9	1st	NCAA Regional
2023	LIU	19–36	16–14	5th	Northeast tournament
2024	LIU	33–25	24–9	2nd	NCAA Regional
2025	LIU	35–23	24–6	1st	Northeast tournament
2026	LIU	30–22	26–7	1st	NCAA Regional
LIU (Brooklyn):		252–232 (.521)	164–96 (.631)		
Total:		252–232 (.521)			
National champion Postseason invitational champion Conference regular season champion Conference regular season and conference tournament champion Division regular season champion Division regular season and conference tournament champion Conference tournament champion

== See also ==
- List of current NCAA Division I baseball coaches
