= Jennifer Patrick-Swift =

American softball coach

Biographical details
- Born: Northern Cambria, Pennsylvania, U.S.
- Education: Methodist University

Playing career
- Position: First baseman

Coaching career (HC unless noted)
- 2005: Washington & Jefferson (asst.)
- 2006: Chowan
- 2007–2008: York College (Penn)
- 2009–2010: Millersville (asst.)
- 2011: Seton Hill
- 2012–2018: Saint Francis
- 2019–2023: NC State

Head coaching record
- Overall: 339–242 (.583)

Jennifer Patrick-Swift is an American softball coach who was the head coach at North Carolina State from 2019 to 2023.

== Coaching career ==
=== St. Francis ===
Patrick-Swift led the Red Flash to undefeated seasons in conference play in 2017 and 2018 and the NCAA tournament in both seasons, the first two NCAA appearances for Saint Francis' softball team in history.

=== NC State ===
On June 2, 2018, Jennifer Patrick-Swift was announced as the new head coach of the NC State softball program.

On March 2, 2023, NC State relived Patrick-Swift of her duties as head coach.

== Head coaching record ==
=== College ===
Record table
Season	Team	Overall	Conference	Standing	Postseason
Saint Francis Red Flash (Northeast Conference) (2012–2018)
2012	Saint Francis	22–26	9–11	7th	
2013	Saint Francis	24–29	6–14	9th	
2014	Saint Francis	26–23	8–8	5th	
2015	Saint Francis	31–19	9–7	5th	
2016	Saint Francis	34–24	13–3	2nd	
2017	Saint Francis	49–11	16–0	1st	NCAA Regional
2018	Saint Francis	39–19	16–0	1st	NCAA Regional
Saint Francis:		225–151 (.598)	77–43 (.642)		
NC State Wolfpack (Atlantic Coast Conference) (2019–2023)
2019	NC State	31–27	9–15	4th (Atlantic)	
2020	NC State	19–6	3–0	T-1st	Season canceled due to COVID-19
2021	NC State	26–25	15–22	12th	
2022	NC State	33–23	7–17	10th	
2023	NC State	5–10	0–0		
NC State:		114–91 (.556)	34–54 (.386)		
Total:		339–242 (.583)			
National champion Postseason invitational champion Conference regular season champion Conference regular season and conference tournament champion Division regular season champion Division regular season and conference tournament champion Conference tournament champion
