= LIU Baseball Stadium =

Baseball park at Long Island University

- Location in New York Location in the United States
- Former names: LIU Post Baseball Stadium (????–2019)
- Address: 720 Northern Blvd
- Location: Brookville, New York 11548
- Coordinates: 40.813277°N 73.590399°W
- Owner: Long Island University
- Operator: Long Island University
- Type: Stadium
- Event: Baseball
- Surface: Natural grass
- Scoreboard: Electronic
- Field size: LF: 330 ft (100.6 m); LC: 375 ft (114.3 m); CF: 400 ft (121.9 m); RC: 375 ft (114.3 m); RF: 330 ft (100.6 m)

Construction
- Renovated: 2006

Tenants
- LIU Post Pioneers (NCAA) (????–2019); LIU Sharks (NCAA) (2020–present)

Website
- www.liuathletics.com/facilities/liu-baseball-stadium/3%20LIU%20Baseball%20Stadium

LIU Baseball Stadium is a baseball stadium in Brookville, New York. It is the home field of Long Island University Sharks college baseball team. The field served as the home field of the LIU Post Pioneers baseball team until 2019. In 2019, LIU Post and LIU Brooklyn merged athletic programs and became the LIU Sharks. These two programs established that they would host games at what was LIU Post's home field.

== See also ==
- List of NCAA Division I baseball venues
