= LIU Sharks baseball =

NCAA Division I baseball team

LIU Sharks
- 2026 LIU Sharks baseball team
- Founded: 2020 (as LIU)
- University: Long Island University
- Head coach: Dan Pirillo (10th season)
- Conference: Northeast Conference
- Location: Long Island, New York
- Home stadium: LIU Baseball Stadium
- Nickname: Sharks
- Colors: Blue and gold

College World Series appearances
- Division II: 1968#

NCAA tournament appearances
- Division I 1972^{#}, 2018^{#}, 2022*, 2024*, 2026 Division II; 1968#, 1974^, 1976^, 1977^, 1980^, 1982^, 1983^, 1985^, 2008^, 2010^, 2017^, 2019^ (^{#} = LIU Brooklyn Blackbirds; ^ = LIU Post Pioneers)

Conference tournament champions
- 2018, 2022*, 2024, 2026

Conference regular season champions
- 2022*, 2025, 2026

Conference division regular season champions
- NEC North: 2000 *vacated by NCAA

The LIU Sharks baseball team is the varsity intercollegiate athletic team of the Long Island University in Brookville, New York, United States. The team competes in the National Collegiate Athletic Association's Division I and are members of the Northeast Conference.

They began play as LIU in the 2020 season after the merger of LIU Brooklyn and LIU Post, with the Sharks retaining Brooklyn's affiliation with the Northeast. The LIU Post Pioneers (once known as C. W. Post) had played in NCAA College Division from 1958 to 1972 before playing in Division II in 1973. They played in Division III from 1975 to 1977 and in Division I from 1986 to 2002 before moving back to Division II. They played their last game in May 2019.

The Sharks have won the Northeast Conference baseball tournament three times in program history, once as LIU Brooklyn and once under the current branding.

== LIU in the NCAA tournament ==
Year	Record	Pct	Notes
1972	1–2	.333	District 2
2018	0–2	.000	Conway Regional
2022	0–2	.000	College Park Regional
2024	0–2	.000	Chapel Hill Regional
2026	0–2	.000	Athens Regional
TOTALS	1–10	.091	
