= 2015 Northeast Conference softball tournament =

The 2015 Northeast Conference softball tournament was held at North Athletic Complex on the campus of Robert Morris University in Moon Township, Pennsylvania from May 7 through May 9, 2015. The tournament winner earned the Northeast Conference's automatic bid to the 2015 NCAA Division I softball tournament. The entire tournament was available on NEC Front Row.

== Tournament ==
1st Round
1	Robert Morris	2
4	LIU Brooklyn	11^{(5)}
2	Central Connecticut State	2
3	Fairleigh Dickinson	1^{(8)}
Lower round 1
1	Robert Morris	2
3	Fairleigh Dickinson	0

Semifinals
4	LIU-Brooklyn	2
2	Central Connecticut State	6
Lower final
4	LIU-Brooklyn	12
1	Robert Morris	1^{(5)}

Championship
2	Central Connecticut State	9	–
4	LIU-Brooklyn	8	–

- All times listed are Eastern Daylight Time.
