= Saint Francis Red Wolves softball =

College softball team

Saint Francis Red Flash
- University: Saint Francis University
- Head coach: Vacant
- Conference: NEC
- Location: Loretto, Pennsylvania, US
- Home stadium: Red Flash Softball Field
- Nickname: Red Flash
- Colors: Red and white

NCAA Tournament appearances
- 2017, 2018, 2019, 2021, 2022, 2024, 2025

Conference tournament championships
- 2017, 2018, 2019, 2021, 2022, 2024, 2025

Regular-season conference championships
- 2017, 2018, 2021, 2022, 2023, 2024

For information on all Saint Francis University sports, see Saint Francis Red Flash

The Saint Francis Red Flash softball team represents Saint Francis University in NCAA Division I college softball. The team participates in the Northeast Conference (NEC). The Red Flash are currently were most recently led by head coach Beth Krysiak. The team plays its home games at Red Flash Softball Field, which is located on the college's campus.

== History ==
After nearly four decades of minimal success, the Red Flash rose to prominence in the Northeast Conference after the hiring of former coach Jennifer Patrick-Swift and current head coach Jessica O'Donnell. Patrick-Swift left the team after the 2018 season. The program won five NEC tournament championships from 2017 to 2022, as the 2020 NEC tournament was cancelled due to the COVID-19 pandemic. The program also won the NEC regular season championship in 2017, 2018, and from 2021 until 2023. By winning the NEC tournament, the program qualified for the NCAA Division I softball tournament.

In the 2017 NCAA tournament, the Red Flash won their first NCAA tournament game in program history, defeating New Mexico State by a score of 8-4 before being eliminated from the tournament by South Carolina. They were eliminated in 2018, 2019, 2021, and 2022 without winning a game and scoring only six runs in eight total games, but won its second ever game in 2024.

In 2021, former third baseman Mekenzie Saban was named to Softball America's All-American Third-team. In 2022, Saban was named Northeast Conference Player of the Year, while pitcher Rachel Marsden was named Northeast Conference Pitcher of the Year.

On June 21, 2023, head coach Jessica O'Donnell announced her departure from the program to become the head coach of Kent State. Beth Krysiak was named as the new Red Flash head coach on August 9, 2023.

=== Coaching history ===
Years	Coach	Record	%
1986–1990	Tom Cicero	67–85	.441
1991–1993	Terry Bennett	27–51	.346
1994–1998	Rudy Galayda	93–122–2	.433
1999	Christy Cameron	16–28	.364
2000	Missy Radaker	22–20	.524
2001	Brock Radaker	19–24	.442
2002	Michelle Kozak	28–24–1	.538
2003–2004	Laura Cymmerman	22–62	.262
2005–2006	Erin Layton	29–74	.282
2007–2011	Sabrina Lane	87–172	.336
2012–2018	Jennifer Patrick-Swift	226–152	.598
2019–2023	Jessica O’Donnell	137–101	.576
2024–2025	Beth Krysiak	67–40	.626

== Roster ==
2024 Saint Francis Red Flash roster
Pitchers: 5 – Allie Braly – Freshman; 7 – Olivia Kolowitz – Freshman; 24 – Rachel Marsden – Graduate Student; 9 – Grace Vesco – Graduate Student; Catchers: 27 – Annabelle Farmer – Freshman; Outfielders: 11 – Lauren Aubry – Graduate Student; 22 – Sydney Baker – Senior; 15 – Savannah Nash – Sophomore; 12 – Ashley Wruble – Graduate Student	Infielders: 20 – Brianna Sawyers – Sophomore; 17 – Olivia Ulam – Junior; Utility: 2 – Hannah Bendle – Freshman; 25 – Aliya Garroway – Freshman; 19 – Lexi Hernandez – Senior; 28 – Madelynn Kessler – Freshman; 10 – Ashley Orischak – Senior; 26 – Kaylie Walters – Freshman; 3 – Madelyn Wilson – Freshman

== Season-by-season results ==
Record table
Season	Coach	Overall	Conference	Standing	Postseason
Saint Francis Red Flash (Northeast Conference) (1986–present)
1986	Tom Cicero	6–21			
1987	Tom Cicero	9–20			
1988	Tom Cicero	19–16			
1989	Tom Cicero	17–10			
1990	Tom Cicero	16–18			
1991	Terry Bennett	7–22			
1992	Terry Bennett	8–14			
1993	Terry Bennett	12–15			
1994	Rudy Galayda	11–26	4–3		
1995	Rudy Galayda	15–24–1	7–9		
1996	Rudy Galayda	13–31	6–10		
1997	Rudy Galayda	21–24	9–7		
1998	Rudy Galayda	33–17–1	7–2–1	3rd	
1999	Christy Cameron	16–28	6–12	8th	
2000	Missy Radaker	22–20	11–9	5th	
2001	Brock Radaker	19–24	12–8	5th	
2002	Michelle Kozak	28–24–1	12–9–1	4th	
2003	Laura Cymmerman	14–29	11–10	5th	
2004	Laura Cymmerman	8–33	6–12	T–9th	
2005	Erin Layton	9–39	4–13	10th	
2006	Erin Layton	20–35	8–10	T–6th	
2007	Sabrina Lane	17–35	3–15	9th	
2008	Sabrina Lane	24–34	11–6	3rd	
2009	Sabrina Lane	21–30	5–11	8th	
2010	Sabrina Lane	15–35	3–12	10th	
2011	Sabrina Lane	10–38	2–16	11th	
2012	Jennifer Patrick-Swift	22–26	9–11	7th	
2013	Jennifer Patrick-Swift	25–30	6–14	9th	
2014	Jennifer Patrick-Swift	26–23	8–8	5th	
2015	Jennifer Patrick-Swift	31–19	9–7	5th	
2016	Jennifer Patrick-Swift	34–24	13–3	2nd	
2017	Jennifer Patrick-Swift	49–11	16–0	1st	NCAA Regionals
2018	Jennifer Patrick-Swift	39–19	16–0	1st	NCAA Regionals
2019	Jessica O’Donnell	29–31	10–6	3rd	NCAA Regionals
2020	Jessica O’Donnell	5–18	0–0	N/A	Season cancelled due to COVID-19 pandemic
2021	Jessica O’Donnell	40–10	22–2	1st	NCAA Regionals
2022	Jessica O’Donnell	37–18	20–4	1st	NCAA Regionals
2023	Jessica O’Donnell	26–24	15–6	1st	
2024	Beth Krysiak	41–14	24–0	1st	NCAA Regionals
2025	Beth Krysiak	26–26	14–7	2nd	
Total:		799–941–3 (.459)			
National champion Postseason invitational champion Conference regular season champion Conference regular season and conference tournament champion Division regular season champion Division regular season and conference tournament champion Conference tournament champion

== See also ==
- List of NCAA Division I softball programs
