= Sacred Heart Pioneers women's soccer =

American college soccer team

- University: Sacred Heart University
- Head coach: Matt Micros (9th season)
- Location: Fairfield, Connecticut, US
- Nickname: Pioneers
- Colors: Red and white

NCAA tournament appearances
- 2001, 2025

Conference tournament championships
- 2001, 2025

The Sacred Heart Pioneers women's soccer is the team who is representing Sacred Heart University in NCAA Division I college soccer. The Pioneers are led by their head coach Matt Micros.

== History ==
Sacred Heart has made two NCAA tournament appearances in 2001 and 2025. The 2001 team was NEC tournament champions and lost in the NCAA tournament first round to UConn 3-0.

In 2025, the Pioneers defeated Canisius in penalties to win the MAAC tournament title and earned the conference’s NCAA tournament autobid. In the 2025 NCAA Division I women's soccer tournament, Sacred Heart lost to Georgetown 3-0.
