= Central Connecticut Blue Devils =

- University: Central Connecticut State University
- Conference: Northeast Conference
- NCAA: Division I (FCS)
- Athletic director: Thomas Pincince
- Location: New Britain, Connecticut
- Varsity teams: 16
- Football stadium: Arute Field
- Basketball arena: William H. Detrick Gymnasium
- Baseball stadium: CCSU Baseball Field
- Softball stadium: CCSU Softball Field
- Soccer stadium: Central Connecticut Soccer Field
- Volleyball arena: William H. Detrick Gymnasium
- Nickname: Blue Devils
- Colors: Blue and white
- Website: www.ccsubluedevils.com
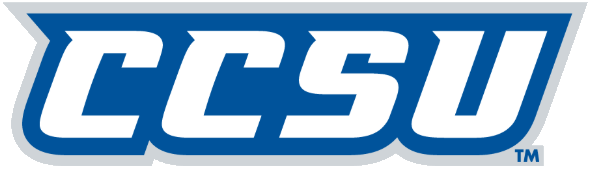

The Central Connecticut Blue Devils are composed of 16 teams representing Central Connecticut State University in intercollegiate athletics, including men and women's basketball, cross country, golf, soccer, and track and field. Men's sports include baseball and football. Women's sports include volleyball, lacrosse, swimming & diving, and softball. The Blue Devils compete in the NCAA Division I Football Championship Subdivision (FCS) and are members of the Northeast Conference.

== Teams ==
Men's sports	Women's sports
Baseball	Basketball
Basketball	Cross country
Cross country	Lacrosse
Football	Soccer
Soccer	Softball
Track & field^{†}	Swimming & Diving
	Track & field^{†}
	Volleyball
† – Track and field includes both indoor and outdoor.

== Facilities ==
Sport	Facility	Capacity
Baseball	CCSU Baseball Field	
Basketball	William H. Detrick Gymnasium	2,654
Cross Country	Stanley Quarter Park	
Football	Arute Field	5,500
Lacrosse	Arute Field	5,500
Soccer	CCSU Soccer Field	1,000
Softball	CCSU Softball Field	
Swimming & diving	Jack Suydam Natatorium	
Track & field	CCSU Track & field	
Volleyball	William H. Detrick Gymnasium	2,654

== Notable alumni ==
=== Baseball ===
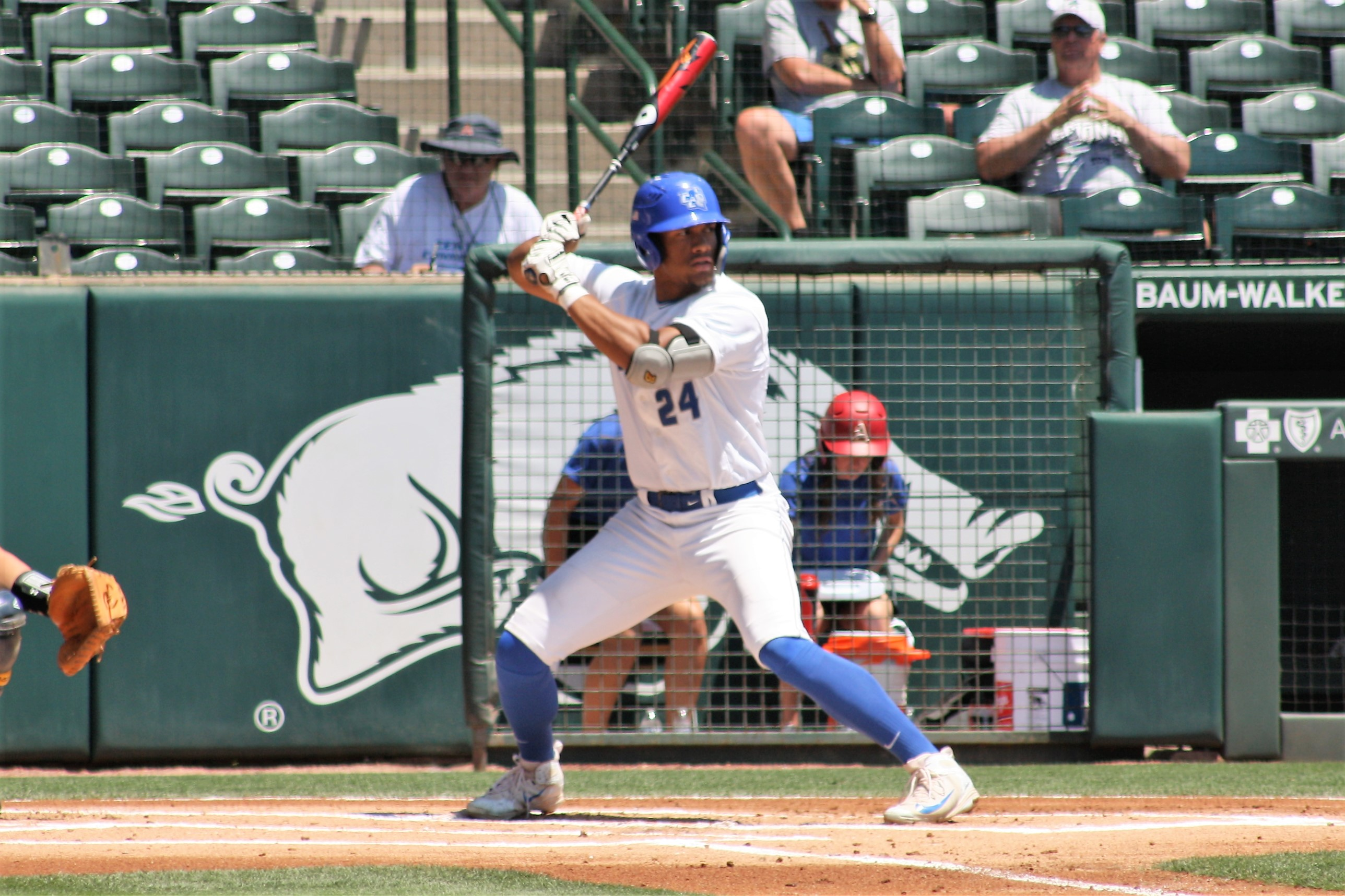
TT Bowens bats for the Blue Devils in the 2019 Fayetteville, Arkansas Regional at Baum-Walker Stadium

- Ricky Bottalico – pitcher, Philadelphia Phillies; analyst, Comcast SportsNet Philadelphia
- John Hirschbeck – MLB umpire
- Alfred "Skip" Jutze – catcher, St. Louis Cardinals, Houston Astros, and Seattle Mariners
- Evan Scribner – Relief pitcher, San Diego Padres, Oakland Athletics and Seattle Mariners

=== Basketball ===
- Corsley Edwards – center and forward, New Orleans Hornets
- Keith Closs – center, Los Angeles Clippers

=== Football ===
- Steve Addazio – Assistant coaching positions: Syracuse, Indiana, Notre Dame, and Florida; Head Coach: Temple University (2011–2012), Head Coach: Boston College (2013–2019), Head Coach: Colorado State (2020–2021)
- Al Bagnoli – Head Coach, the University of Pennsylvania
- Dave Campo – Head Coach, the Dallas Cowboys; Defensive coach, Cleveland Browns, Jacksonville Jaguars, University of Kentucky
- Jake Dolegala – Quarterback, Cincinnati Bengals and New England Patriots
- Justise Hairston – New England Patriots, Buffalo Bills and Indianapolis Colts
- Scott Pioli – General Manager of the Kansas City Chiefs.
- Mike Sherman – Head coach, Green Bay Packers and Texas A&M Aggies
- John Skladany – Defensive coordinator, Houston Cougars; special teams assistant, University of Central Florida Knights.
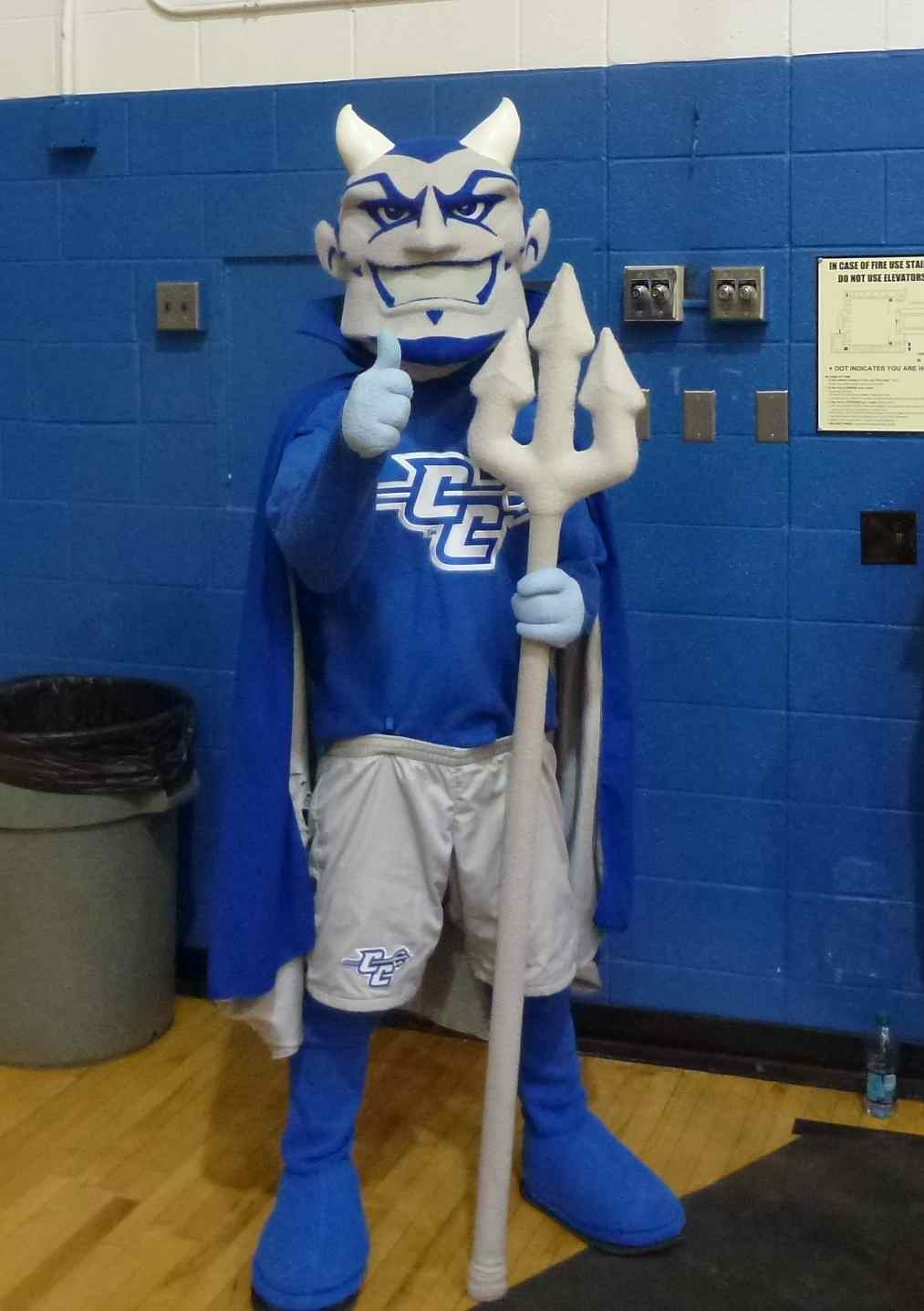
Mascot of the Central Connecticut State University athletic teams

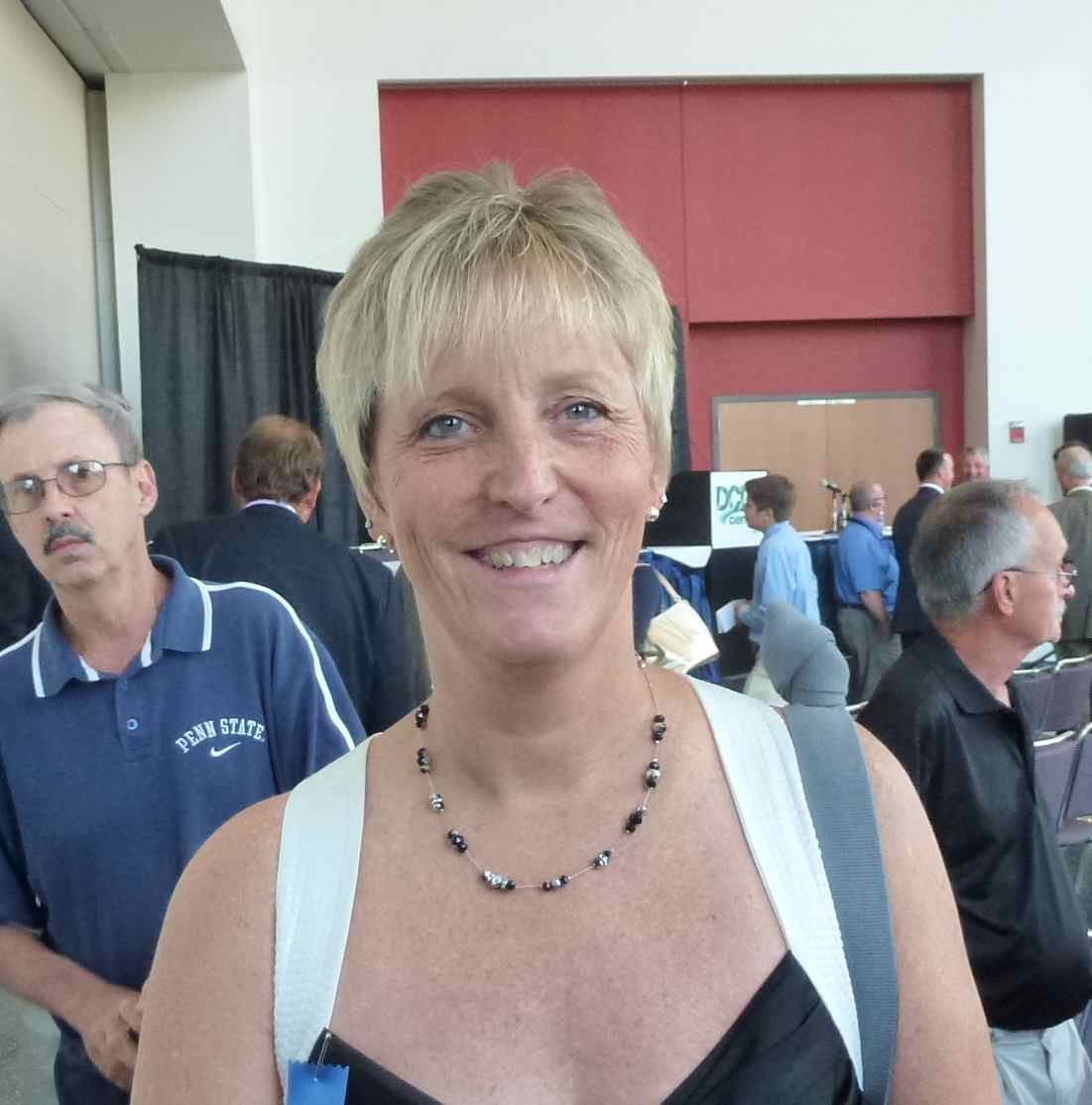
Beryl Piper, Head coach of the Central Connecticut State University women's basketball team

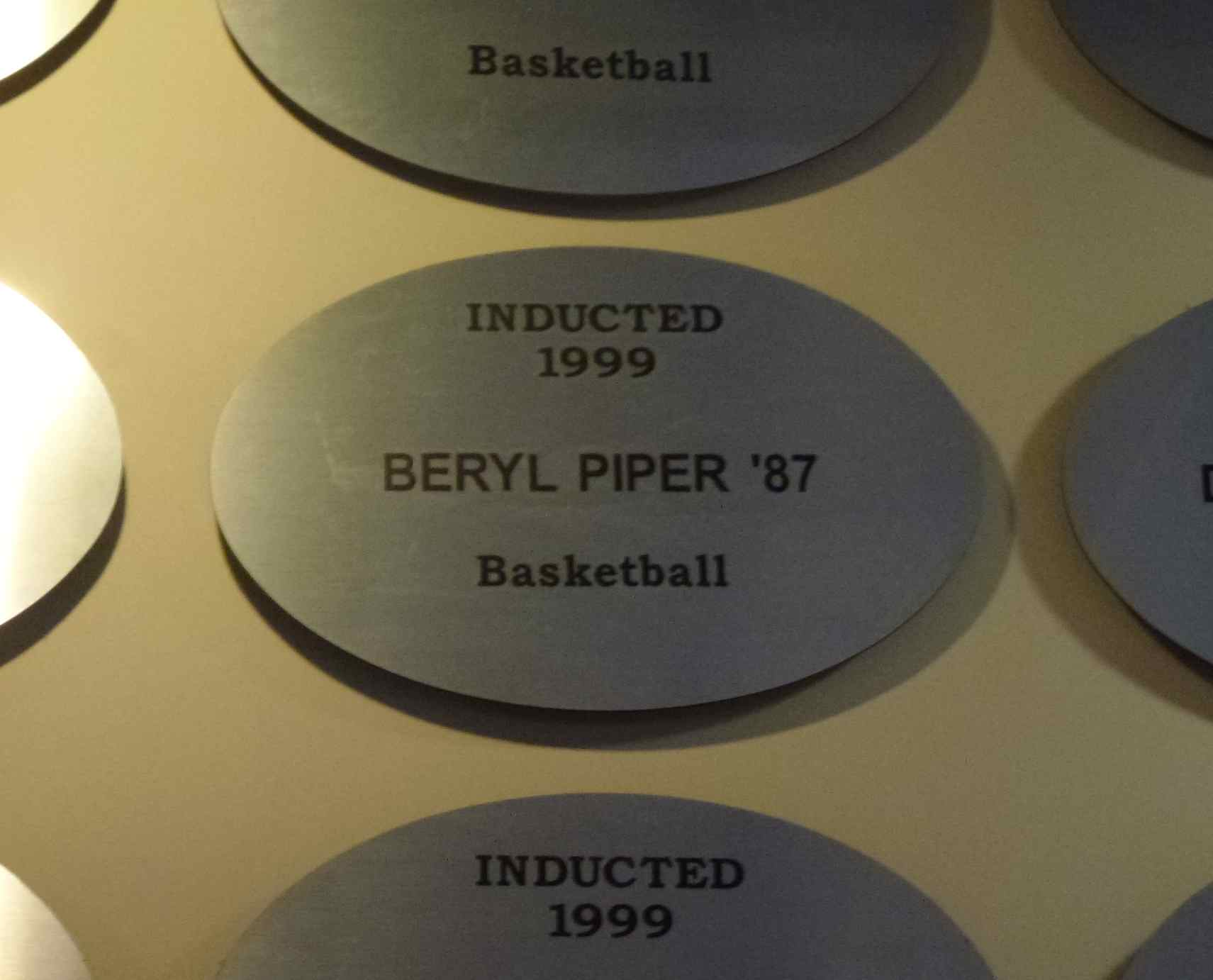
Plaque, commemorating the induction of Beryl Piper into the CCSU Athletic Hall of Fame
