= Saint Francis Red Wolves =

Collegiate athletics teams of Saint Francis University, Pennsylvania

- University: Saint Francis University
- Nickname: Red Wolves
- NCAA: Division III
- Conference: Presidents' Athletic Conference
- Athletic director: Jim Brazill
- Location: Loretto, Pennsylvania
- Varsity teams: 22
- Football stadium: DeGol Field
- Basketball arena: DeGol Arena
- Colors: Red and white
- Mascot: Frankie The Friar
- Website: www.sfuathletics.com
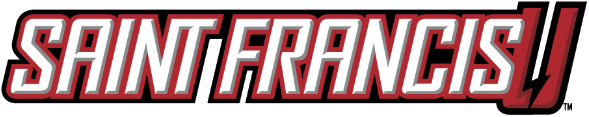

The Saint Francis Red Wolves are the 22 sports teams representing Saint Francis University in Loretto, Pennsylvania in intercollegiate athletics. The Red Wolves compete in the NCAA Division III and are primary members of the Presidents' Athletic Conference (PAC).

On March 25, 2025, Saint Francis announced that its athletic programs would move to Division III at the conclusion of the 2025–26 academic year, and join the Presidents' Athletic Conference (PAC). The school cited increasing complexities in governance in Division I athletics, including the transfer portal and name, image, and likeness (NIL) deals, as well as student welfare, as being among the factors in the decision.

Student-athletes already on athletic scholarships as of 2025 will continue to receive aid through the end of the 2027–28 academic year, provided they continue participating in Saint Francis athletics. This would only impact student-athletes that have a redshirt year before 2028, since all others would have used their eligibility by then.

Student-athletes in the 2025 recruiting class will be eligible for athletic scholarships. However, these scholarships will expire at the conclusion of the 2026–27 academic year, i.e. the first Division III transitional year. After the transition to Division III begins in 2026, Saint Francis will play schedules in its sponsored sports primarily comprising Division III opponents. Saint Francis will not become eligible for NCAA Division III championships until the 2029–30 academic year. Since the PAC does not sponsor women's water polo and field hockey, Saint Francis is pursuing affiliate membership in one or more other conferences for those sports. The CWPA has a Division III women's water polo conference into which Saint Francis could transfer.

Formerly known as the Red Flash, on June 3, 2026, Saint Francis made the announcement that they would be rebranding the nickname of their athletic teams to the Red Wolves for the 2026–27 athletic year to coincide with their move to Division III.

== Teams ==
Men's sports	Women's sports
Basketball	Basketball
Cross country	Cross country
Football	Field hockey
Golf	Golf
Soccer	Lacrosse
Tennis	Soccer
Track & field^{1}	Softball
Volleyball	Swimming & diving
	Tennis
	Track & field^{1}
	Volleyball
	Water polo
^{1} – includes both indoor and outdoor.
