= Central Connecticut Blue Devils women's soccer =

American college soccer team

Central Connecticut Blue Devils
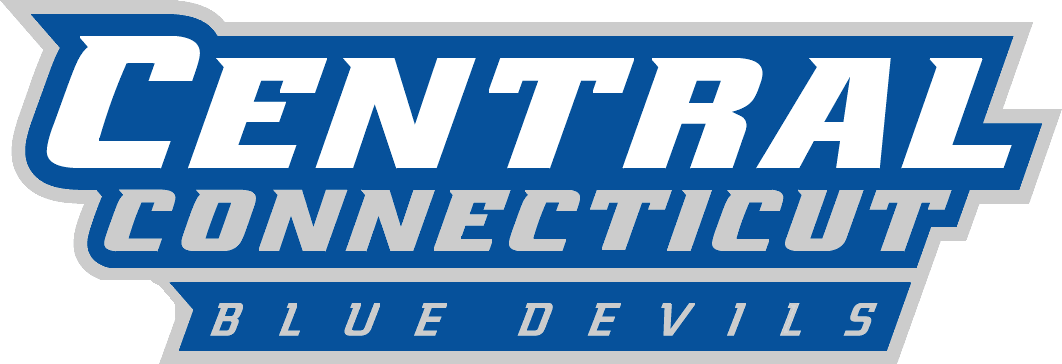
- University: Central Connecticut State University
- Head coach: Mick D'Arcy (22nd season)
- Conference: NEC
- Location: New Britain, Connecticut, US
- Stadium: CCSU Soccer Field (capacity: 1,000)
- Nickname: Blue Devils
- Colors: Blue and white

NCAA tournament appearances
- 1998, 2002, 2003, 2004, 2005, 2006, 2008, 2014, 2018, 2019, 2020

Conference tournament championships
- 1997, 1998, 2002, 2003, 2004, 2005, 2008, 2014, 2018, 2019, 2020–21, 2021

Conference Regular Season championships
- 1997, 1998, 1999, 2002, 2003, 2005, 2009, 2018, 2019, 2020–21, 2021

The Central Connecticut Blue Devils women's soccer program is the college soccer team for Central Connecticut State University located in the U.S. state of Connecticut. The team competes is a member of the Northeast Conference. The team plays its home games at the 1,000 seat CCSU Soccer Field in New Britain, Connecticut. The Blue Devils are coached by Mick D'Arcy.

== History ==
CCSU have been to the NCAA Tournament ten times, with a record of 2–10. They reached the second round of the tournament in 2001 and 2019.

The Blue Devils have won the Northeast Conference regular-season title 11 times, and have won the NEC Tournament title 12 times.
