= LIU Sharks =

Athletic teams representing Long Island University

- University: Long Island University
- NCAA: Division I (FCS)
- Conference: Northeast Conference (primary); Other conferences: List: Independent (men's ice hockey); EIWA (wrestling); MAAC (women's water polo); CWPA (men's water polo); NEWHA (women's ice hockey); EAGL (women's gymnastics); NCEA (women's equestrian)
- Athletic director: Elliott Charles
- Location: Brooklyn, New York; Brookville, New York
- Varsity teams: 39
- Football stadium: Bethpage Federal Credit Union Stadium
- Basketball arena: Steinberg Wellness Center and Barclays Center
- Ice hockey arena: Northwell Health Ice Center
- Baseball stadium: LIU Baseball Stadium
- Softball stadium: LIU Softball Complex
- Soccer stadium: LIU Soccer Park
- Nickname: Sharks
- Colors: Blue and gold
- Website: www.liuathletics.com

The LIU Sharks are the athletics teams representing Long Island University's (LIU) campuses in Brooklyn and Brookville, New York. The Sharks compete in NCAA Division I athletics and are members of the Northeast Conference. The LIU Sharks are the result of the July 1, 2019 unification of the athletic departments which had previously represented two separate campuses of LIU, the NCAA Division I LIU Brooklyn Blackbirds and the NCAA Division II LIU Post Pioneers.

== History ==
Following Long Island University's founding in 1926, its sports teams wore blue uniforms and became known as the Blue Devils. After the school's uniforms were changed to black in 1935, a Brooklyn Eagle reporter from the Midwest saw the new look as the basketball team dribbled up and down the court and stated that the team looked like the blackbirds from back home; the comment struck home, and a new nickname was born. During the 1930s and '40s, the basketball team was often called the "Beemen," while they were coached by the legendary Naismith Basketball Hall of Fame coach, Clair Bee. LIU Post opened in 1954 as C.W. Post College and began athletic competition in 1956–57.

The LIU Brooklyn Blackbirds and LIU Post Pioneers combined for 23 national championships (7 team, 16 individual), 215 conference titles, and 362 All-Americans.

=== Unification ===
On October 3, 2018, Long Island University announced that it was unifying the athletic programs of its two campuses into one Division I program, effective with the 2019–20 academic year. The unified LIU program continues to sponsor all varsity sports that either campus sponsored before the merger. The new program's nickname of Sharks was announced on May 15, 2019.

The LIU Sharks inherited the athletic legacy of the Brooklyn campus, including its membership in the Northeast Conference. The Division II LIU Post teams for sports that had not been sponsored by LIU Brooklyn immediately moved to Division I without the usual transition period for an institution moving to a different division. Teams for sports sponsored by both campuses were merged. LIU added two completely new women's sports effective in 2019–20. Shortly before the athletic merger was announced, LIU Brooklyn announced that it would add women's ice hockey and shortly after the merger announcement, LIU announced it would add women's water polo, placing that sport in the Metro Atlantic Athletic Conference.

The university incorporated athletic facilities on both the Brooklyn and Brookville campuses with basketball, bowling, fencing, ice hockey, swimming, track and field (indoor & outdoor), volleyball, and water polo based out of the Brooklyn campus while baseball, cross country, esports, equestrian, field hockey, football, golf, lacrosse, rugby, soccer, softball, tennis, and wrestling operating from the Brookville campus.

== Spirit squads ==
In 2025, the LIU spirit squads won their third consecutive national title at the UCA & UDA College Cheerleading and Dance Team National Championships. Their win came in the Open Spirit Program Game Day category.

== Sponsored sports ==
Long Island University fields 35 teams that compete in 14 men's and 20 women's sports and 1 co-ed e-sports team. Most teams compete in the Northeast Conference (NEC). Affiliations outside the Northeast Conference are as follows:

Men's sports	Women's sports
Baseball	Acrobatics and tumbling
Basketball	Basketball
Cross country	Bowling
Fencing	Cross country
Football	Equestrian
Golf	Fencing
Ice hockey	Field hockey
Lacrosse	Golf
Rowing	Gymnastics
Soccer	Ice hockey
Swimming	Lacrosse
Tennis	Rowing
Track and field^{†}	Rugby
Volleyball	Soccer
Water polo	Softball
Wrestling	Swimming
	Tennis
	Track and field^{†}
	Volleyball
	Water polo
Co-ed sports
ESports
† – Track and field includes both indoor and outdoor

Sport	Conference
Women's equestrian	Independent
Esports	EAC
Fencing (Note: NCAA fencing is a coeducational sport. Most schools field both men's and women's squads, and all individual matches involve members of a single sex. LIU fields both men's and women's squads.)	Independent
Women's gymnastics	EAGL
Men's ice hockey	Independent
Women's ice hockey	NEWHA
Women's rowing	TBD
Women's rugby	NIRA
Men's water polo	CWPA
Women's water polo	MAAC
Men's wrestling	EIWA
^{1} 2021–22 only, after which the NEC began sponsoring men's volleyball program.

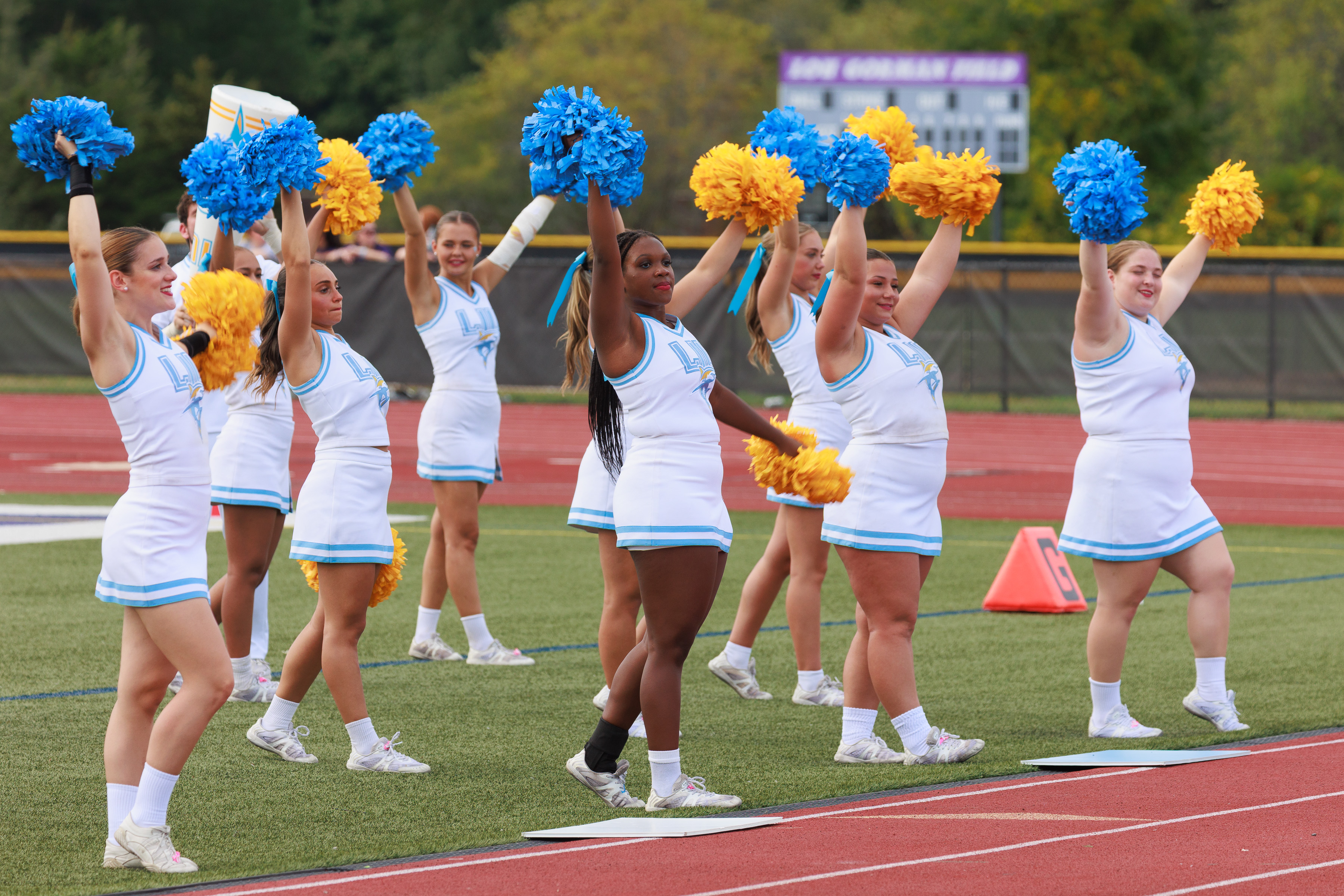
LIU cheerleaders

== NCAA team championships ==
- Men's Division II Lacrosse Championship – 1996, 2009, 2010
- Women's Division II Lacrosse Championship – 2001, 2007, 2012, 2013

* Both competing as LIU Post Pioneers.
