= Wagner Seahawks =

Intercollegiate sports teams of Wagner College

- University: Wagner College
- Nickname: Seahawks
- NCAA: Division I (FCS) (FCS)
- Conference: Northeast Conference (primary); MAAC (women's water polo); MAWPC (men's water polo)
- Athletic director: Ariel Pesante
- Location: Staten Island, New York
- Varsity teams: 28 (12 men's, 16 women's)
- Football stadium: Hameline Field
- Basketball arena: Spiro Sports Center
- Baseball stadium: SIUH Community Park
- Softball stadium: Wagner Softball Field
- Colors: Green and white
- Mascot: Sammy the Seahawk
- Website: wagnerathletics.com
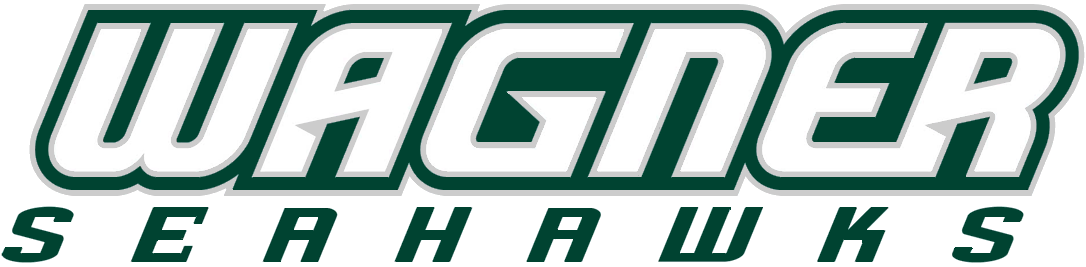

Team NCAA championships
- 1

The Wagner Seahawks are composed of 28 teams representing Wagner College in intercollegiate athletics. Sports sponsored for both men and women are basketball, cross country, golf, lacrosse, fencing, tennis, track & field (both indoor and outdoor, which the NCAA classifies as two separate sports for each sex), swimming & diving, and water polo. Sports sponsored only for men are baseball and football. Women-only sports are bowling, soccer, softball, triathlon, field hockey, and flag football.

The Seahawks compete in the NCAA Division I Football Championship Subdivision (FCS) and are members of the Northeast Conference for all sports except water polo, in which the women compete in the Metro Atlantic Athletic Conference and the men compete in the Collegiate Water Polo Association, and triathlon, in which all currently competing NCAA institutions are officially classified as independents.

== History ==
Walt Hameline, who served as the Director of Athletics for 40 years (1982–2022) and 34 years as head football coach at Wagner (1981–2014), won the school's only National Championship with a 19–3 victory over the University of Dayton in the 1987 NCAA Division III Championship game (also known as the 1987 Stagg Bowl). He was named NCAA Division III Coach of the Year in 1987. During his 34-year coaching career, Hameline amassed an all-time record of 223–139–2 (.615) at Wagner College. Upon his retirement as head football coach following the 2014 regular season, those 223 victories ranked fifth among active head Football Championship Subdivision head coaches and remains in the top 10 among all Division I-FCS coaches in the United States.

Notable Wagner sports coaches of the past include former Seton Hall University, NBA head coach and current TV analyst P.J. Carlesimo (head basketball coach 1976–1982), former Marquette University and Wagner head coach Mike Deane, Jim Lee Howell (head football coach 1947–1953, who went on to become the head coach of the New York Giants), and former University of Florida head football coach Dan Mullen (assistant football coach 1994–1995). In 2019, two NFL coaches who had previously been Wagner assistant coaches were elevated to defensive coordinator positions. As of 2025, Lou Anarumo heads the Indianapolis Colts' defense, while Patrick Graham is defensive coordinator for the Las Vegas Raiders.

The football team's home venue is Hameline Field (designated in 2012) at Wagner College Stadium, while the basketball teams play their home games in the Spiro Sports Center's Sutter Gymnasium.

Six of Wagner's student athletes have been NEC Student-Athlete of the Year winners (2013–2018).

In March 2025, Wagner College fencer Red Sullivan was involved in a widely reported incident at the Cherry Blossom Open fencing tournament in Maryland. An opposing fencer, Stephanie Turner, refused to compete against Sullivan, who is a transgender woman, and was disqualified after kneeling in protest on the piste. The incident received national media attention and sparked debate over USA Fencing's policies on transgender athletes. The institution shortly thereafter released a statement saying that Sullivan was no longer a part of the fencing team. A congressional hearing was held over the incident, leading to USA Fencing implementing a ban on trans women in women's fencing and Wagner College agreeing to comply with the Trump Administration regarding trans athletes. Turner was subsequently awarded $5000 by Riley Gaines as a brand ambassador of XX-XY Athletics.

In July 2026, Wagner College named Ariel Pesante as Director of Athletics. "Pesante comes to Wagner from Georgetown University, where he served as Senior Associate Athletics Director for Internal Operations. As a member of the athletics executive staff, he provided leadership for compliance, academic support, sports medicine and sports performance, served as the sport administrator for football, baseball and women's squash, co-chaired the institution's Name, Image and Likeness working group and helped guide departmental strategy and operations.

Prior to Georgetown, Pesante served as Associate Athletics Director for Governance and Compliance at the University of Massachusetts Amherst, where he oversaw the operation of the Minutemen's compliance program, including rules education, Name, Image and Likeness initiatives, financial aid, NCAA governance and legislative matters."

== Sponsored teams ==
A member of the Northeast Conference, Wagner sponsors teams in 12 men's and 16 women's NCAA-sanctioned sports.

Men's sports	Women's sports
Baseball	Basketball
Basketball	Bowling
Cross Country	Cross Country
Football	Fencing
Fencing	Field Hockey
Golf	Golf
Lacrosse	Lacrosse
Swimming & Diving	Soccer
Tennis	Softball
Track and Field (Note: Track & field includes both the indoor and outdoor forms of the sport, which the NCAA classifies as two separate sports.)	Swimming & Diving
Water Polo (Note: Competes in the varsity division of the Collegiate Water Polo Association.)	Tennis
	Track and Field
	Triathlon
	Water Polo (Note: Competes in the Metro Atlantic Athletic Conference.)
	Women's Flag Football

== Notable alumni ==
- Andrew Bailey, former Major League Baseball All-Star pitcher
- P.J. Carlesimo, NBA Head Coach, Wagner Basketball Head Coach 1976–1982
- Nick Dini, Major League Baseball catcher for the Kansas City Royals
- Cam Gill, National Football League linebacker for the Tampa Bay Buccaneers
