= 2024 Florida State Seminoles women's soccer team =

2024 Florida State Seminoles women's soccer

ACC Tournament Champions

NCAA Tournament, Second Round
- Conference: Atlantic Coast Conference
- U. Soc. Coaches poll: No. 13
- TopDrawerSoccer.com: No. 17
- Record: 15–2–4 (7–2–1 ACC)
- Head coach: Brian Pensky (3rd season)
- Assistant coaches: Bobby Shuttleworth (3rd season); Jonathan Bornstein (1st season); Micah Bledsoe (1st season)
- Home stadium: Seminole Soccer Complex

2024 ACC women's soccer standings
	Conf.						Overall
Team	W		L		T	PCT	W		L		T	PCT
No. 3 Duke ‍†‍‍^{y}	9	–	0	–	1	.950	18	–	3	–	1	.841
No. 2 Wake Forest ‍‍‍^{y}	7	–	2	–	1	.750	16	–	4	–	4	.750
No. 13 Florida State ‍‍‡‍^{y}	7	–	2	–	1	.750	15	–	2	–	4	.810
No. 1 North Carolina ‍‍‍^{y}	7	–	3	–	0	.700	22	–	5	–	0	.815
No. 7 Virginia Tech ‍‍‍^{y}	6	–	2	–	2	.700	14	–	6	–	3	.674
No. 6 Notre Dame ‍‍‍^{y}	5	–	1	–	4	.700	14	–	4	–	4	.727
California ‍‍‍^{y}	5	–	4	–	1	.550	13	–	6	–	2	.667
No. 4 Stanford ‍‍‍^{y}	5	–	4	–	1	.550	16	–	5	–	2	.739
Virginia ‍‍‍^{y}	5	–	5	–	0	.500	13	–	5	–	1	.711
Boston College ‍‍‍	4	–	4	–	2	.500	12	–	5	–	2	.684
Pittsburgh ‍‍‍	3	–	5	–	2	.400	9	–	6	–	3	.583
Louisville ‍‍‍	2	–	5	–	3	.350	7	–	6	–	5	.528
SMU ‍‍‍	2	–	6	–	2	.300	6	–	9	–	2	.412
Clemson ‍‍‍	2	–	7	–	1	.250	6	–	8	–	3	.441
Miami (FL) ‍‍‍	1	–	6	–	3	.250	5	–	8	–	4	.412
NC State ‍‍‍	1	–	6	–	3	.250	4	–	10	–	4	.333
Syracuse ‍‍‍	0	–	9	–	1	.050	6	–	10	–	2	.389
† – Conference champion ‡ – 2024 ACC Tournament champion y – Invited to the NCAA Tournament; As of December 10, 2024; Rankings from United Soccer Coaches Poll; Source: The ACC

The 2024 Florida State Seminoles women's soccer team represented Florida State University during the 2024 NCAA Division I women's soccer season. This was the 30th season of the university fielding a women's soccer program, during all of which they have been members of the Atlantic Coast Conference. The Seminoles were led by third-year head coach Brian Pensky, and played their home games at Seminole Soccer Complex. The Seminoles entered the season as defending ACC Regular Season, ACC Tournament, and NCAA Tournament champions.

The Seminoles began the season ranked first in the national polls and had three straight wins over non-Power 4 opponents. Their first Power 4 and ranked opponent was number twenty four Georgia who they drew 1–1. A win over Villanova in the same week couldn't prevent them from dropping to number three in the polls. Their final non-conference opponent was rival Florida, whom they defeated 3–0. They ascended to number two in the polls to start ACC play. They went 2–0–1 in their first three games, defeating Clemson and Syracuse and drawing with ACC newcomers SMU. A match-up with number four Wake Forest gave the Semionles their first loss of the season. They were unable to immedatley rebound and lost their next game to unranked Virginia Tech. They fell to number twenty-two in the polls. However, this was their only blemish during the regular season, as they won their final five ACC games. Highlights included wins over number twenty three Virginia, number four North Carolina, and a rivalry victory over Miami.

The Seminoles finished the regular season 12–2–2 and 7–2–1 in ACC play to finish in a tie for second place. As the third seed in the ACC Tournament, they hosted sixth seed and thirteenth ranked Notre Dame in the First Round. The Seminoles won and advanced to the Semifinals where they advanced via penalty shoot-out against Wake Forest. The Final was a rematch of a regular season foe North Carolina, which the Seminoles won 3–2. This was the Seminoles seventh consecutive ACC tournament title. As tournament champions, they received an automatic bid to the NCAA Tournament and were the first seed in the Florida State Bracket. They defeated Samford in the First Round, before being upset by Vanderbilt in the Second Round via penalty shoot-out. Florida State ended the season with a 15–2–4 overall record.

== Previous season ==
The Seminoles finished the season 22–0–1 and 9–0–1 in ACC play to finish in first place. As the first seed in the ACC Tournament, they received a bye into the Semifinals where they defeated Pittsburgh and Clemson to win their fourth consecutive ACC Tournament title. As tournament champions, they received an automatic bid to the NCAA Tournament and were the first seed in the Florida State Bracket and the top overall seed in the tournament. They defeated Morehead State in the First Round, Texas A&M in the Second Round, Texas in the Third Round, Pittsburgh again in the Quarterfinals, Clemson again in the Semifinals, and Stanford in the Final. Their 5–1 victory in the championship won the team their fourth overall title, all of which have come since 2014. Stanford's 36 game streak of allowing one or fewer goals was snapped and this was the first match where the Cardinal allowed five or more goals in a game since 1996. This was the first national championship match between two undefeated teams and Florida State became the first undefeated champion since Stanford in 2011.

== Offseason ==
=== Departures ===
Departures
Name	Number	Pos.	Height	Year	Hometown	Reason for departure
Olivia Garcia	0	FW	5'7"	Sophomore	Las Vegas, Nevada	Signed professional contract with HB Køge
Cristina Roque	1	GK	5'7"	Senior	Winter Garden, Florida	Graduated; drafted 33rd overall in the 2024 NWSL Draft
Maggie Taitano	4	MF	5'5"	Freshman	Carlsbad, California	Transferred to South Carolina
Onyi Echegini	6	MF	5'8"	Senior	Nijmegen, Netherlands	Signed professional contract with Paris Saint-Germain
Lauren Flynn	8	DF	5'6"	Senior	Arlington, Virginia	Graduated; drafted 16th overall in the 2024 NWSL Draft
Beata Olsson	9	FW	5'5"	Senior	Enköping, Sweden	Signed professional contract with AIK
Jody Brown	10	FW	5'3"	Senior	Saint Ann, Jamaica	Signed professional contract with Benfica
Leilanni Nesbeth	13	FW	5'4"	Senior	St. David's, Bermuda	Graduated; drafted 10th overall in the 2024 NWSL Draft
Kaitlyn Zipay	15	MF	5'7"	(redshirt) Junior	Winter Springs, Florida	Graduated
Maria Alagoa	18	MF	5'5"	Junior	Viseu, Portugal	Transferred to USC
Leah Pais	30	FW	5'4"	Senior	Ontario, Canada	Signed professional contract with Þróttur

=== Incoming transfers ===
Incoming transfers
Name	Number	Pos.	Height	Year	Hometown	Previous school
Giana Riley	5	FW	5'8"	Junior	Manteca, California	Gonzaga
Marianyela Jiménez	8	MF	5'6"	Senior	Puerto Cabello, Venezuela	William Carey
Camille Ashe	13	DF	5'10"	Graduate Student	Arlington, Virginia	Portland
Carissa Boeckmann	14	MF	5'5"	Senior	San Antonio, Texas	Texas A&M
Kameron Simmonds	19	FW	5'7"	Junior	Midlothian, Virginia	Tennessee
Maddie Smith	23	GK	5'8"	Graduate Student	Omaha, Nebraska	Maryland

=== Recruiting class ===
Name	Nationality	Hometown	Club	TDS Rating
Jordyn Bugg; DF	(United States)	El Cajon, California	San Diego Surf	4/5 stars
Lara Dantas; MF	(Brazil)	Rio de Janeiro, Brazil	IMG Academy	N/A
Wrianna Hudson; FW	(United States)	Rochester, New York	WNY Flash	4/5 stars
Emma Kirlin; GK	(United States)	Greenville, South Carolina	Carolina Elite Soccer Academy	3/5 stars
Peyton McGovern; MF	(United States)	Bristow, Virginia	Virginia Development Academy	4/5 stars
Nina Norshie; DF	(Ghana)	Accra, Ghana	Barton Community College	N/A
Ashlyn Puerta; MF	(United States)	San Diego, California	Albion SC San Diego	4/5 stars
Taylor Suarez; FW	(United States)	Charlotte, North Carolina	Charlotte Soccer Academy	4/5 stars
Solai Washington; FW	(Jamaica)	Atlanta, GA	Concorde Fire SC	4/5 stars

Note: Bugg originally committed to play for the Seminoles but later signed a professional contract with Seattle Reign FC.

== Squad ==
=== Roster ===
As of February 7, 2025

Note: Flags indicate national team as defined under FIFA eligibility rules; some limited exceptions apply. Players may hold more than one non-FIFA nationality.

No.	Pos.	Nation	Player
1	GK	USA	Adelyn Todd
3	MF	USA	Taylor Huff
5	FW	USA	Giana Riley
6	MF	BRA	Lara Dantas
7	MF	JPN	Ran Iwai
8	MF	VEN	Marianyela Jiménez
9	FW	USA	Taylor Suarez
10	MF	USA	Peyton Nourse
11	FW	USA	Jordynn Dudley
12	DF	GHA	Nina Norshie
13	DF	USA	Camille Ashe
14	MF	USA	Carissa Boeckmann

No.	Pos.	Nation	Player
15	MF	USA	Peyton McGovern
16	MF	USA	Sophia Nguyen
17	MF	JAM	Mimi Van Zanten
18	GK	USA	Emma Kirlin
19	FW	JAM	Kameron Simmonds
20	DF	USA	Heather Gilchrist
21	FW	USA	Olivia Lebdaoui
22	DF	USA	Claire Rain
23	GK	USA	Maddie Smith
28	FW	JAM	Solai Washington
30	MF	USA	Ashlyn Puerta
42	FW	USA	Wrianna Hudson

=== Team management ===
Position	Staff
Athletic Director	Michael Alford
Head coach	Brian Pensky
Associate Head Coach	Bobby Shuttleworth
Assistant Coach	Jonathan Bornstein
Assistant Coach	Micah Bledsoe
Director of Operations	Sara Brown
Athletic Trainer	Alora Sullivan

== Schedule ==
Date Time, TV	Rank^{#}	Opponent^{#}	Result	Record	Site (Attendance) City, State
Exhibition
August 9*; 9:10 p.m.	No. 1	TCU	W 5–2	—	Seminole Soccer Complex; Tallahassee, FL
Non-conference Regular season
August 15*; 7:00 p.m., ESPN+	No. 1	at South Florida	W 5–0	1–0	Corbett Stadium (1,234); Tampa, Florida
August 18*; 6:00 p.m., ACCNX	No. 1	North Florida	W 10–0	2–0	Seminole Soccer Complex (1,094); Tallahassee, FL
August 22*; 7:00 p.m., ACCN	No. 1	Rice	W 3–0	3–0	Seminole Soccer Complex (984); Tallahassee, FL
August 29*; 7:00 p.m., ACCNX	No. 1	No. 24 Georgia	T 1–1	3–0–1	Seminole Soccer Complex (1,684); Tallahassee, FL
September 1*; 12:00 p.m., ACCNX	No. 1	Villanova	W 2–0	4–0–1	Seminole Soccer Complex (840); Tallahassee, FL
September 8*; 2:00 p.m., SECN	No. 3	at Florida; Rivalry	W 3–0	5–0–1	Pressly Stadium (1,294); Gainesville, FL
ACC Regular season
September 19; 7:00 p.m., ACCNX	No. 2	Syracuse	W 5–1	6–0–1 (1–0)	Seminole Soccer Complex (1,234); Tallahassee, FL
September 22; 2:00 p.m., ACCN	No. 2	at SMU	T 1–1	6–0–2 (1–0–1)	Washburne Stadium (710); Dallas, TX
September 28 (Note: delayed from originally scheduled date of September 26 due to the effects of Hurricane Helene); 6:00 p.m., ACCNX	No. 6	Clemson	W 3–0	7–0–2 (2–0–1)	Seminole Soccer Complex (894); Tallahassee, FL
October 3; 7:00 p.m., ACCNX	No. 6	at No. 4 Wake Forest	L 1–4	7–1–2 (2–1–1)	Spry Stadium (1,621); Winston-Salem, NC
October 6; 1:00 p.m., ACCNX	No. 6	at Virginia Tech	L 2–3	7–2–2 (2–2–1)	Thompson Field (1,056); Blacksburg, VA
October 12; 7:00 p.m., ACCNX	No. 22	at Boston College	W 1–0	8–2–2 (3–2–1)	Newton Campus Soccer Field (1,024); Chestnut Hill, MA
October 17; 7:00 p.m., ESPNU	No. 22	No. 23 Virginia	W 4–0	9–2–2 (4–2–1)	Seminole Soccer Complex (1,234); Tallahassee, FL
October 20; 1:00 p.m., ACCNX	No. 22	Pittsburgh	W 7–1	10–2–2 (5–2–1)	Seminole Soccer Complex (854); Tallahassee, FL
October 25; 7:00 p.m., ACCNX	No. 17	No. 4 North Carolina	W 4–2	11–2–2 (6–2–1)	Seminole Soccer Complex (1,684); Tallahassee, FL
October 31; 6:00 p.m., ACCN	No. 6	at Miami (FL); Rivalry	W 1–0	12–2–2 (7–2–1)	Cobb Stadium (428); Coral Gables, FL
ACC tournament
November 3; 8:00 p.m., ACCN	(3) No. 6	(6) No. 13 Notre Dame; First Round	W 2–1	13–2–2	Seminole Soccer Complex (1,166); Tallahassee, FL
November 7; 5:30 p.m., ACCN	(3) No. 6	vs. (2) No. 3 Wake Forest; Semifinal	T 1–1 (3–1 PKs)	13–2–3	WakeMed Soccer Park (1,065); Cary, NC
November 10; 12:00 p.m., ESPNU	(3) No. 6	vs. (4) No. 8 North Carolina; Final	W 3–2	14–2–3	WakeMed Soccer Park (2,905); Cary, NC
NCAA tournament
November 15; 5:00 p.m., ESPN+	(1) No. 6	Samford; First Round	W 8–0	15–2–3	Seminole Soccer Complex (1,668); Tallahassee, FL
November 22; 5:30 p.m., ESPN+	(1) No. 6	(8) Vanderbilt; Second Round	T 3–3 (3–4 PKs)	15–2–4	Seminole Soccer Complex (2,128); Tallahassee, FL
*Non-conference game. ^{#}Rankings from United Soccer Coaches. (#) Tournament seedings in parentheses. All times are in Eastern.

== Awards and honors ==
Recipient	Award	Date	Ref.
Jordynn Dudley	Pre-season All-ACC Team	August 8, 2024	
Heather Gilchrist	Pre-season All-ACC Team	August 8, 2024	
Taylor Huff	Pre-season All-ACC Team	August 8, 2024	
Jordynn Dudley	Herman Trophy watchlist	August 17, 2024	
Taylor Huff	Herman Trophy watchlist	August 17, 2024	
Giana Riley	Herman Trophy watchlist	August 17, 2024	
Taylor Huff	ACC Offensive Player of the Week – Week 1	August 20, 2024	
Jordynn Dudley	ACC Offensive Player of the Week – Week 11	October 29, 2024	
Taylor Huff	All-ACC First Team	November 6, 2024	
Jordynn Dudley	All-ACC First Team	November 6, 2024	
Heather Gilchrist	All-ACC Third Team	November 6, 2024	
Mimi Van Zanten	All-ACC Third Team	November 6, 2024	
Wrianna Hudson	ACC All-Freshman Team	November 6, 2024	
Solai Washington	ACC All-Freshman Team	November 6, 2024	
Taylor Huff	ACC Tournament MVP	November 10, 2024	
Taylor Huff	All-ACC Tournament Team	November 10, 2024	
Addie Todd	All-ACC Tournament Team	November 10, 2024	
Solai Washington	All-ACC Tournament Team	November 10, 2024	
Jordynn Dudley	All-ACC Tournament Team	November 10, 2024	
Heather Gilchrist	All-ACC Tournament Team	November 10, 2024	
Taylor Huff	Herman Trophy semifinalist	December 4, 2024	
Jordynn Dudley	Herman Trophy semifinalist	December 4, 2024	
Taylor Huff	United Soccer Coaches All-American First Team	December 8, 2024	
Jordynn Dudley	United Soccer Coaches All-American Second Team	December 8, 2024	
Heather Gilchrist	United Soccer Coaches All-American Fourth Team	December 8, 2024	
Taylor Huff	Honda Sports Award finalist	December 13, 2024	

== Rankings ==
Ranking movements Legend: ██ Increase in ranking ██ Decrease in ranking ( ) = First-place votes
	Week																	
Poll	Pre	1	2	3	4	5	6	7	8	9	10	11	12	13	14	15	16	Final
United Soccer	1 (8)	1 (8)	1 (8)	3 (2)	3	2	6	6	22	22	17	6	Not released					13
TopDrawer Soccer	1	1	1	4	3	3	7	4	12	7	6	4	4	1	1	17	17	17
