= Heather Gilchrist =

American soccer player (born 2004)

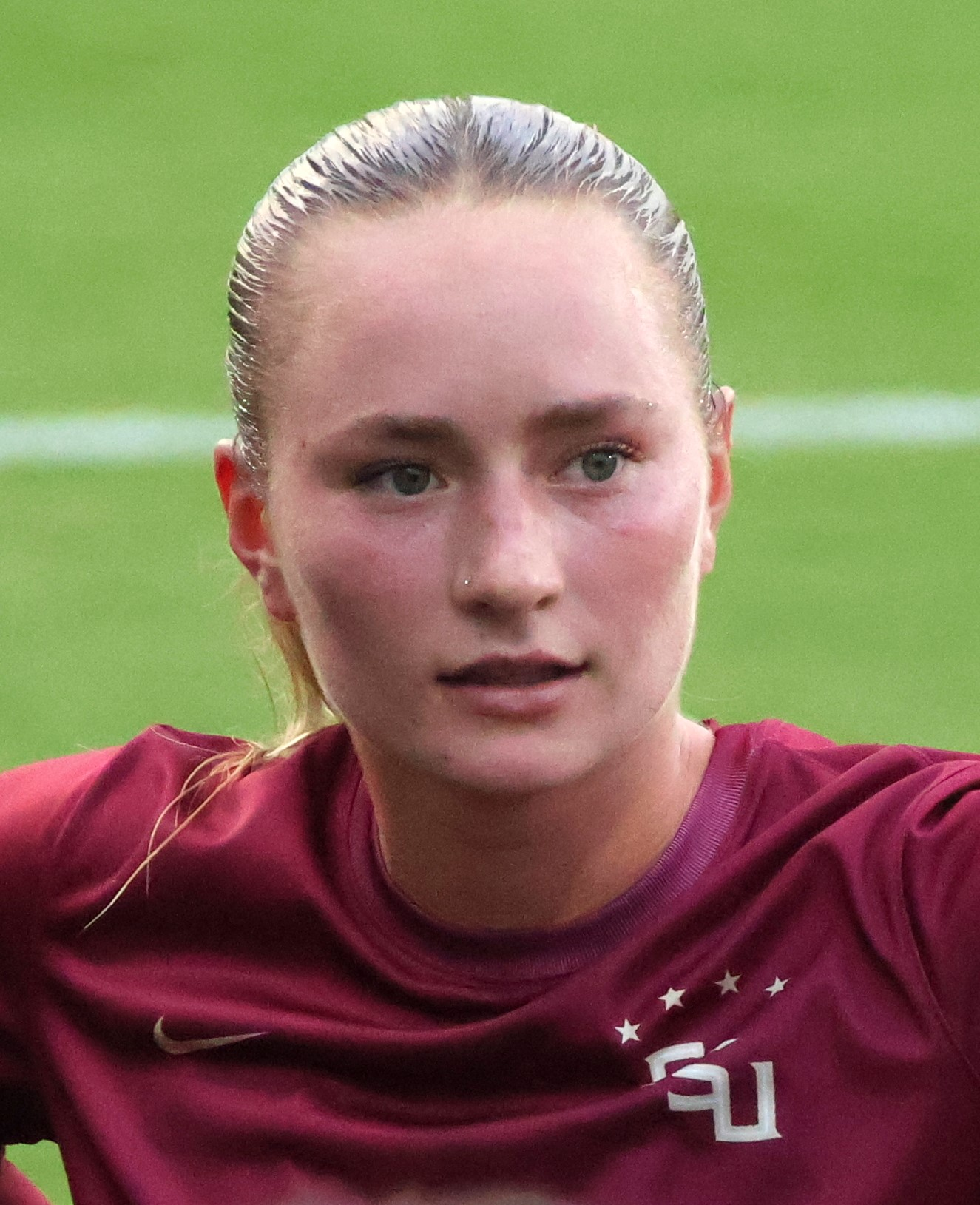
- Gilchrist with Florida State in 2025

Personal information
- Full name: Heather Suzanne Gilchrist
- Date of birth: March 4, 2004 (age 22)
- Height: 5 ft 8 in (1.73 m)
- Position: Center back

Team information
- Current team: Bay FC
- Number: 2

Youth career
- Colorado Rush

College career
Years	Team	Apps	(Gls)
2022–2025	Florida State Seminoles	81	(5)

Senior career*
Years	Team	Apps	(Gls)
2026–	Bay FC	10	(1)

International career^{‡}
2024	United States U-20	12	(0)
- * Club domestic league appearances and goals as of 04:59, November 2, 2026 (UTC) ‡ National team caps and goals as of September 21, 2024

Heather Suzanne Gilchrist (born March 4, 2004) is an American professional soccer player who plays as a center back for Bay FC of the National Women's Soccer League (NWSL). She played college soccer for the Florida State Seminoles, winning two national championships (2023 and 2025) and earning All-American honors twice. She won bronze with the United States at the 2024 FIFA U-20 Women's World Cup.

== Early life ==
Gilchrist grew up in Boulder, Colorado, the daughter of Anne and Anthony Gilchrist. Her parents played college sports at Cornell University, her mother in equestrian and her father in tennis. Gilchrist played club soccer for Colorado Rush in the ECNL and the Colorado Rapids in the WPSL. She attended Fairview High School. She initially committed to play college soccer for Oregon, but after its head coach resigned, she flipped her commitment to Florida State.

== College career ==
Gilchrist was an immediate starter for the Florida State Seminoles as a freshman in 2022, earning Atlantic Coast Conference (ACC) all-freshman honors. She helped the Seminoles reach the NCAA tournament semifinals, where she conceded a penalty in the 3–2 loss to North Carolina. She then contributed to Florida State's undefeated season and fourth national title in her sophomore year in 2023. She played every minute in the NCAA tournament, allowing just one goal in six games. She earned an assist on the opening goal in the 2–0 semifinal win over Clemson, then won 5–1 against Stanford in the final.

Despite missing about a month while at the 2024 FIFA U-20 Women's World Cup, Gilchrist earned third-team All-ACC and fourth-team All-American honors as a junior in 2024. She helped the Seminoles win their fifth consecutive ACC tournament title but lost to Vanderbilt on penalties in the NCAA tournament second round, though she made hers. After graduating early, she returned for a fourth season and led the Seminoles to their fifth national title as a graduate student in 2025. She scored a career-high four goals including the lone goal against Lipscomb in the NCAA tournament second round. She was involved in penalty scares in both the 1–0 semifinal win against TCU and the 1–0 win over Stanford in the final, but neither possible foul was awarded on review. She was named third-team All-ACC and third-team All-American and included in the NCAA all-tournament team.

== Club career ==
Bay FC announced on December 23, 2025, that the club had signed Gilchrist to her first professional contract on a three-year deal, reuniting her with Seminoles teammate Taylor Huff. She sustained a knee injury during preseason and missed the first several months of the season. She made her professional debut on August 9, 2026, as a second-half substitute in a 0–0 draw with the Chicago Stars. The following week, she started against the Utah Royals and scored her first professional goal, heading after a corner kick; the match ended 3–2 to the Royals.

== International career ==
Gilchrist was called into training camp with the United States youth national team with the combined under-18/under-19 squad and the under-20 team in 2023. She appeared for the under-20 team throughout 2024 and was selected to the roster for the 2024 FIFA U-20 Women's World Cup. She started five of seven games at the FIFA U-20 Women's World Cup, helping the United States finish in third place, its best result since 2012. She was called up by Emma Hayes into Futures Camp, practicing alongside the senior national team, in January 2025.

== Honors and awards ==
Florida State Seminoles

- NCAA Division I women's soccer tournament: 2023, 2025
- ACC women's soccer tournament: 2022, 2023, 2024

Individual

- Third-team All-American: 2025
- Fourth-team All-American: 2024
- Third-team All-ACC: 2024, 2025
- ACC all-freshman team: 2022
- NCAA tournament all-tournament team: 2025
