= Lara Dantas =

Brazilian soccer player (born 2005)

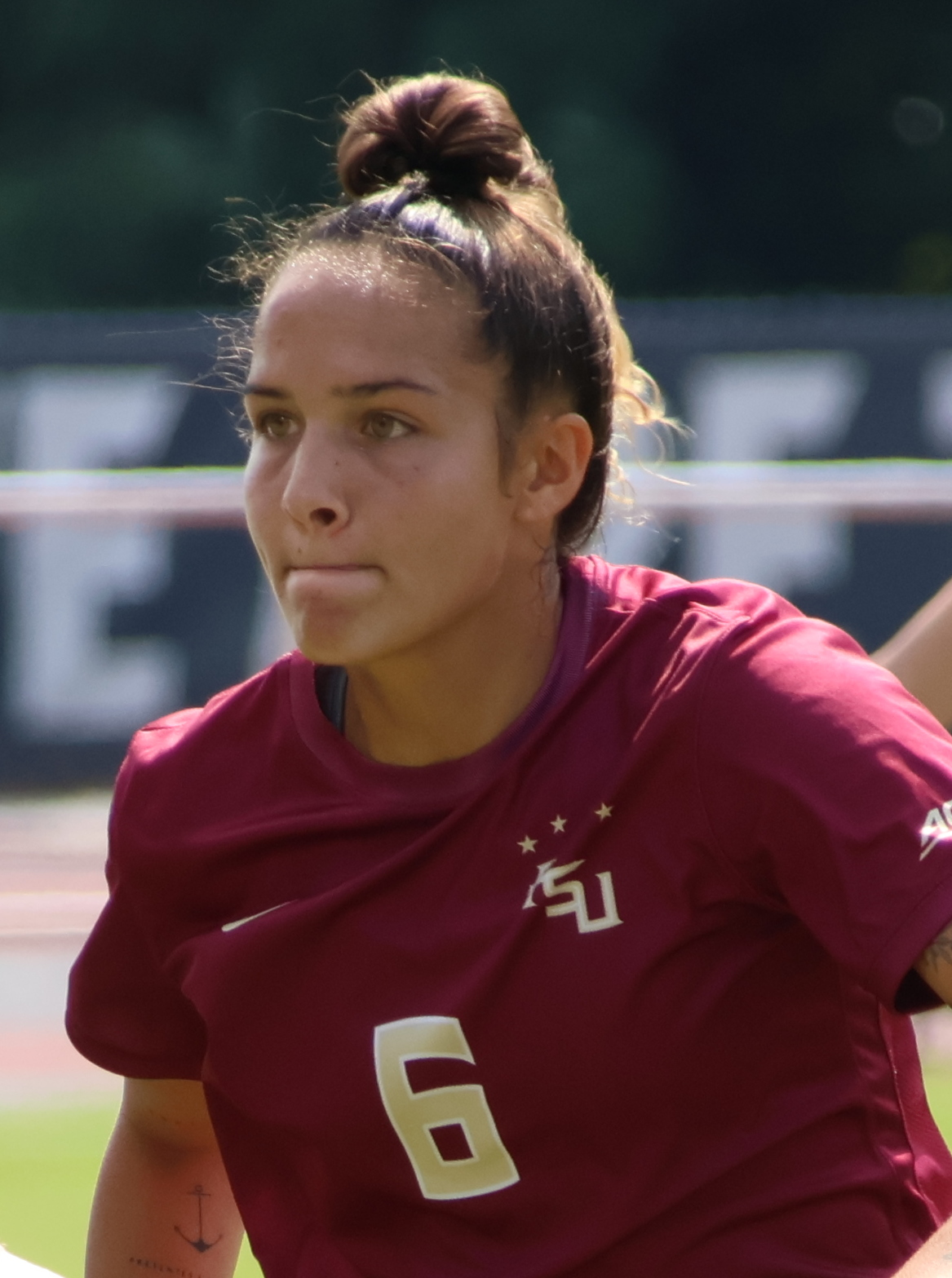
- Dantas with Florida State in 2025

Personal information
- Full name: Lara Dantas Ferreira dos Santos
- Date of birth: September 1, 2005 (age 21)
- Height: 5 ft 8 in (1.73 m)
- Position: Midfielder

Team information
- Current team: Florida State Seminoles
- Number: 6

Youth career
- 2019–2021: Fluminense
- 2021–2024: IMG Academy

College career
Years	Team	Apps	(Gls)
2024–	Florida State Seminoles	29	(5)

International career
2022	Brazil U-17		
2024	Brazil U-20	13	(3)

Lara Dantas Ferreira dos Santos (born September 1, 2005) is a Brazilian college soccer player who plays as a midfielder for the Florida State Seminoles. She won the 2025 national championship with the Seminoles.

== Early life ==
Dantas grew up in Rio de Janeiro and began playing soccer with her brother when she was five. She joined Fluminense's new girls' academy at age 13 in 2019, winning the national under-18 championship in 2021. She moved to the United States the same year to attend IMG Academy in Florida and led the team to the DPL national title in 2022.

== College career ==
Dantas scored 4 goals in 11 games for the Florida State Seminoles as a freshman in 2024. In her sophomore year in 2025, she made 18 appearances and scored 1 goal as the Seminoles won their fifth national title.

== International career ==
Dantas was part of Brazil's youth international successes at the 2022 South American U-17 Women's Championship and the 2024 South American Under-20 Women's Football Championship. She played in all four games with three starts at the 2022 FIFA U-17 Women's World Cup, scoring twice as a substitute against hosts India and starting in the quarterfinal loss to Germany. She played in all five games with three starts at the 2024 FIFA U-20 Women's World Cup, scoring once against Fiji for the group winners and quarterfinalists.

== Honors and awards ==
Florida State Seminoles

- NCAA Division I women's soccer tournament: 2025
- ACC women's soccer tournament: 2024

Brazil U-17

- South American U-17 Women's Championship: 2022

Brazil U-20

- South American U-20 Women's Championship: 2024
