= Kristin Grubka =

American soccer player (born 1992)

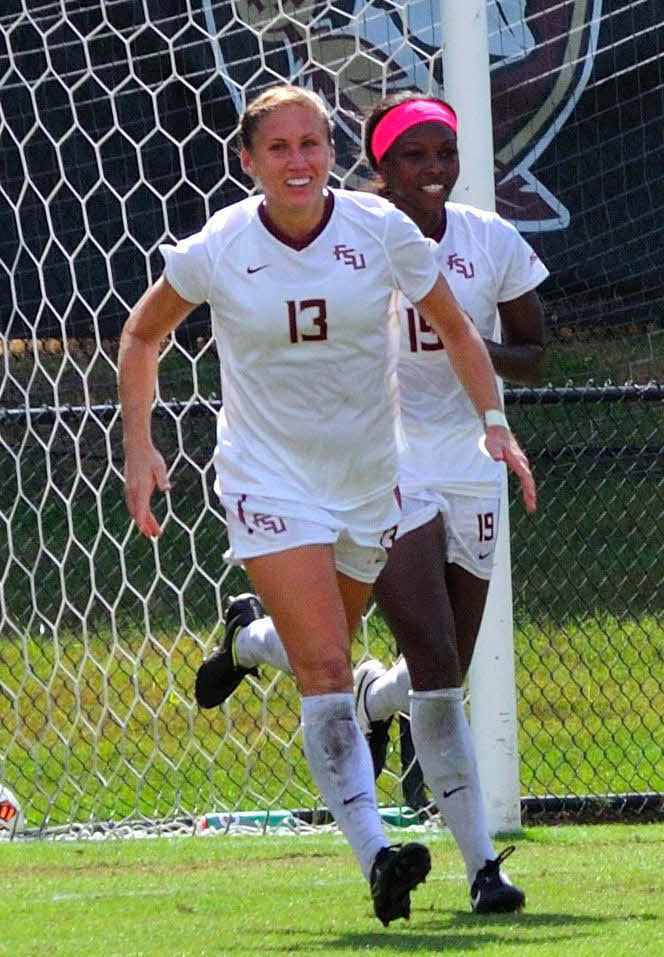

Personal information
- Full name: Kristin Nicole Grubka
- Date of birth: December 17, 1992 (age 33)
- Place of birth: Melbourne, Florida, United States
- Height: 5 ft 10 in (1.78 m)
- Position: Defender

College career
Years	Team	Apps	(Gls)
2011–2014	Florida State Seminoles	104	(15)

Senior career*
Years	Team	Apps	(Gls)
2015–2016	Sky Blue FC	29	(0)

International career
2014–2015	United States U23		
- * Club domestic league appearances and goals as of May 26, 2015

Kristin Nicole Grubka (born December 17, 1992) is an American soccer player.

== College career ==
=== Florida State University, 2011–2014 ===
Grubka played for the Florida State Seminoles from 2011 to 2014. In her senior year she started all 26 games, helping lead the Seminoles defense to a program record 19 shutouts in 2014. She won the NCAA Championship with FSU in 2014.

== Club career ==
=== Sky Blue FC, 2015–2016 ===
Grubka was selected by Sky Blue FC with the 10th overall pick in the 2015 NWSL College Draft. She made 29 appearances over two seasons with Sky Blue. She was not included in Sky Blue's 2017 preseason roster, and was not picked up by another team.
