= Sophia Nguyen =

American soccer player (born 2003)

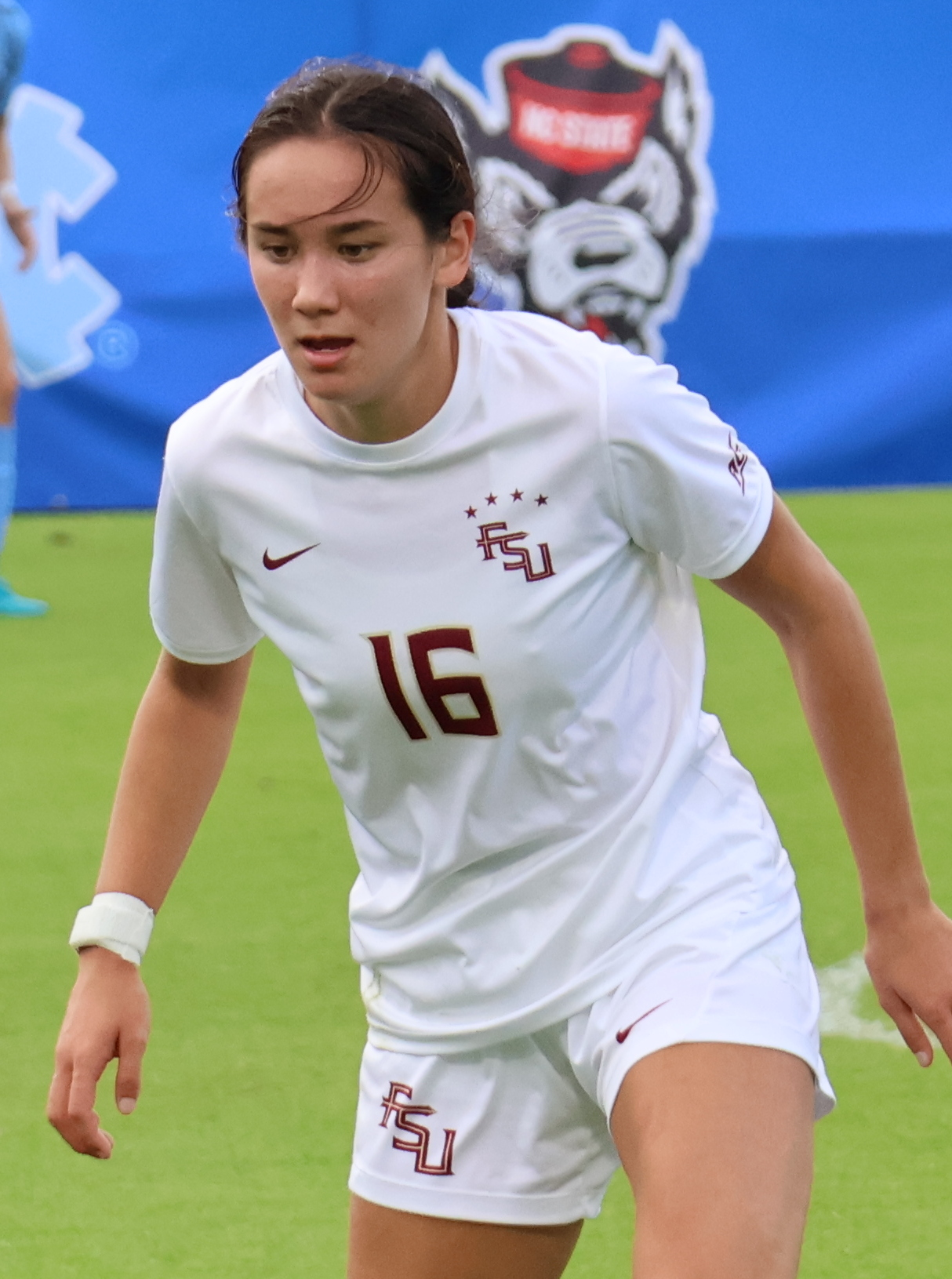
- Nguyen with Florida State in 2024

Personal information
- Full name: Sophia Jean Nguyen
- Date of birth: September 13, 2003 (age 23)
- Height: 5 ft 6 in (1.68 m)
- Positions: Right back; midfielder

College career
Years	Team	Apps	(Gls)
2022–2025	Florida State Seminoles	84	(2)

Sophia Jean Nguyen (born September 13, 2003) is an American soccer player who plays as a right back or midfielder. She played college soccer for the Florida State Seminoles, winning the 2023 and 2025 national championships.

== Early life ==
Nguyen grew up in Pensacola, Florida, the youngest of four children born to Angela and Hung Nguyen. In her sophomore year at Pensacola High School, she scored 31 goals with 17 assists and led Pensacola to the regional finals, being named the Pensacola News Journal Player of the Year in 2020. She committed to play college soccer for Florida State as a rising junior. She missed her entire senior season after tearing her the posterior cruciate ligament (PCL) in her left knee, ending her high school career with 61 goals and 33 assists in 34 games. She played club soccer for Pensacola FC Academy (formerly Gulf Coast Texans) and later joined ECNL club Orlando City, which required her parents to make six-hour drives each way.

Nguyen was also a competitive skimboarder growing up, winning United Skim Tour world titles in 2017, 2018, 2019, and 2021. Her first win at age 14 made her one of the sport's youngest champions.

== College career ==
Nguyen played for the Florida State Seminoles from 2022 to 2025, making 84 appearances (58 starts) and scoring 2 goals. Primarily a right back, she wore a knee brace throughout her freshman season as she recovered from her PCL injury, helping the Seminoles reach the NCAA tournament semifinals. She began her sophomore season as a starter but reaggravated her knee midseason played off the bench over the rest of 2023. Florida State finished the season undefeated and won their fourth NCAA tournament title, winning 5–1 against Stanford in the final. Nguyen was an undisputed starting midfielder in her junior year in 2024, helping the Seminoles win their fifth consecutive ACC tournament title, but were upset on penalties in the NCAA tournament second round. She was again a starter in her senior year until she was injured in the ACC tournament quarterfinals, playing off the bench for most of the NCAA tournament as the Seminoles won their fifth national title. She earned the winning assist through her cross to Wrianna Hudson in the 1–0 win over TCU in the semifinals, then won 1–0 against Stanford in the final.

== Honors and awards ==
Florida State Seminoles

- NCAA Division I women's soccer tournament: 2023, 2025
- ACC women's soccer tournament: 2022, 2023, 2024
