= Wrianna Hudson =

American soccer player (born 2005)

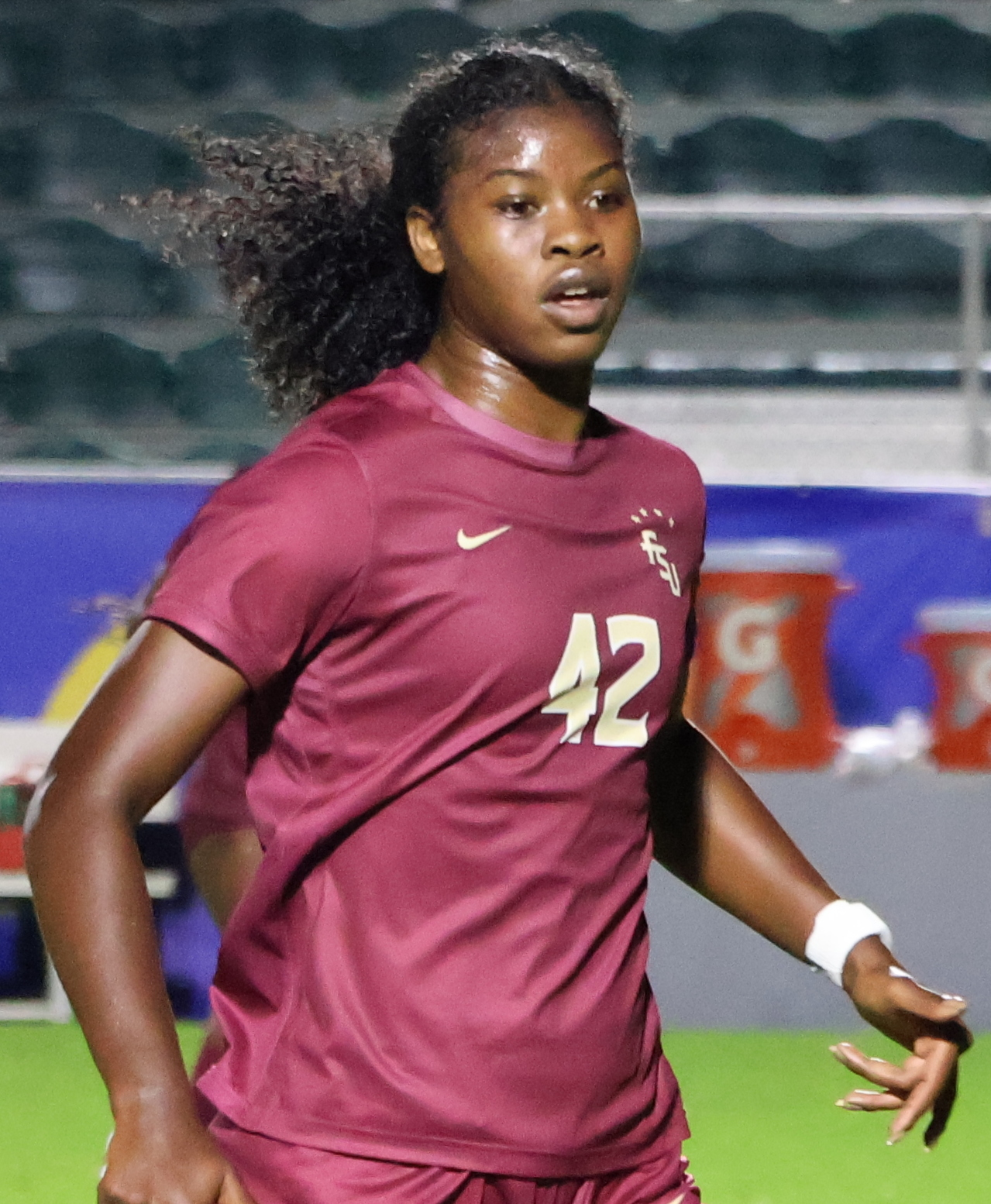
- Hudson with Florida State in 2024

Personal information
- Date of birth: November 15, 2005 (age 20)
- Height: 6 ft 2 in (1.88 m)
- Position: Forward

Team information
- Current team: Florida State Seminoles
- Number: 42

Youth career
- Western New York Flash
- 2020–2023: Greece Athena Trojans

College career
Years	Team	Apps	(Gls)
2024–	Florida State Seminoles	43	(23)

Wrianna Hudson (born November 15, 2005) is an American college soccer player who plays as a forward for the Florida State Seminoles. She led the Seminoles to the 2025 national championship as a sophomore and was named the NCAA Tournament Most Outstanding Offensive Player. She is the younger sister of fellow soccer player Waniya Hudson.

== Early life ==
Hudson grew up in Rochester, New York. She stood 6 feet 2 inches (1.88 m) by her freshman year in high school. She totaled 92 goals in her high school career at Greece Athena High School, earning four all-region honors and three all-state selections. She played club soccer for the Western New York Flash and was named ECNL All-American in 2021. In 2022, she was named the All-Greater Rochester Player of the Year as a junior after leading the region with 32 goals. She missed half of her senior season after undergoing ankle surgery in the summer. During her senior season, she scored a goal against Canandaigua, dribbling through several defenders, that went viral and was the number-one highlight on SportsCenter's top plays. Later in 2023, she impressed at the High School All-American Game and scored two goals in a 3–1 victory for East. She also participated in track and field and flag football in high school. She was ranked by TopDrawerSoccer as the 51st-best prospect of the 2024 class, part of Florida State's top-ranked recruiting class.

== College career ==
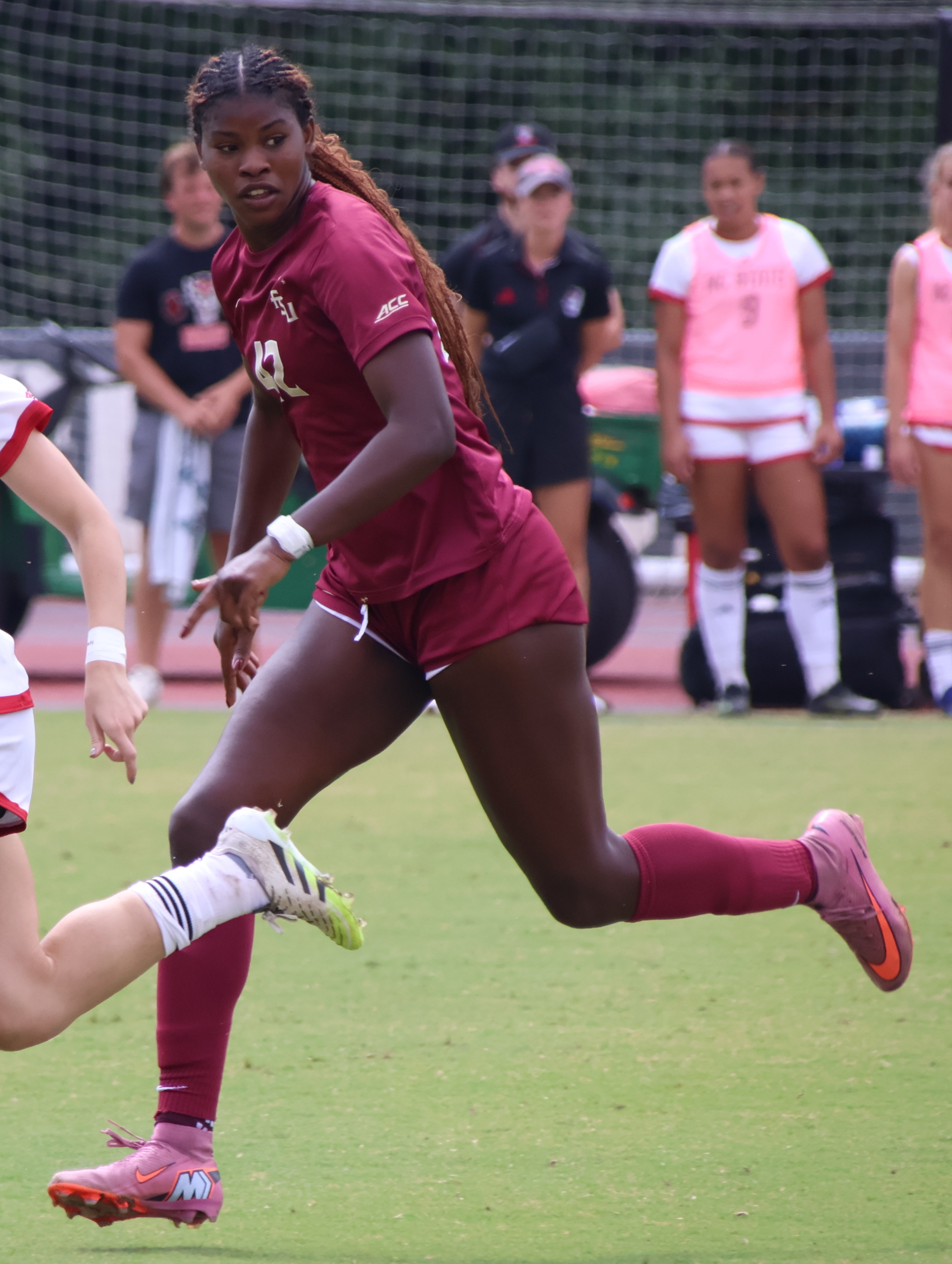
Hudson playing for Florida State in 2025

Hudson played in all 21 games and scored 9 goals for the Florida State Seminoles as a freshman in 2024, earning ACC all-freshman honors. She helped the Seminoles win their fifth consecutive ACC tournament title, scoring the winning goal in a 3–2 win over North Carolina in the final. The team earned a one seed in the NCAA tournament but was upset on penalties in the second round. Hudson led the Seminoles with 15 goals in 22 games (fifth in the ACC) as a sophomore in 2025, earning second-team All-ACC honors. She scored a tying goal with thirty seconds remaining against NC State early in the ACC season. In the NCAA tournament semifinals against TCU, she scored the lone goal in a 1–0 win with a leaping left-footed finish from Sophia Nguyen's cross. In the final against Stanford, she found the winning goal with three minutes remaining, scoring from a deflected Taylor Suarez pass, as the Seminoles won 1–0 to become national champions for the fifth time in program history. She was named the NCAA College Cup's Most Outstanding Offensive Player.

== International career ==
Hudson was called into United States national team development camp, training concurrently with the senior national team, in January 2026.

== Personal life ==
Hudson is the daughter of Woodruff and Wanda Hudson and has three older siblings. Her father played college basketball at RIT; her mother ran track at Nazareth; her older brother, Woody, played ice hockey at St. Lawrence; her sister Winsom played soccer at Buffalo State; and her other sister, Waniya, played soccer at Notre Dame.

== Honors and awards ==
Florida State Seminoles

- NCAA Division I women's soccer tournament: 2025
- ACC women's soccer tournament: 2024

Individual

- Second-team All-ACC: 2025, 2026
- ACC all-freshman team: 2024
- NCAA Division I Tournament Most Outstanding Offensive Player: 2025
