= Taylor Suarez =

American soccer player (born 2005)

- Suarez with Angel City FC in 2026

Personal information
- Full name: Taylor Marie Suarez
- Date of birth: July 27, 2005 (age 21)
- Height: 5 ft 5 in (1.65 m)
- Positions: Midfielder; forward

Team information
- Current team: Angel City
- Number: 99

Youth career
- Charlotte SA
- 2021–2023: Ardrey Kell Knights

College career
Years	Team	Apps	(Gls)
2024–2025	Florida State Seminoles	36	(8)

Senior career*
Years	Team	Apps	(Gls)
2026–	Angel City	28	(5)

International career^{‡}
2022	United States U-17	13	(3)
2024–2025	United States U-20	8	(1)
2026–	United States U-23	1	(0)
Medal record
Women's soccer
FIFA U-20 Women's World Cup
Bronze medal – third place	Colombia 2024
- * Club domestic league appearances and goals as of November 1, 2026 ‡ National team caps and goals as of 14:16, March 8, 2026 (UTC)

Taylor Marie Suarez (born July 27, 2005) is an American professional soccer player who plays as a midfielder or forward for Angel City FC of the National Women's Soccer League (NWSL). She played college soccer for the Florida State Seminoles, winning the national championship and earning second-team All-American honors in 2025. She won bronze with the United States at the 2024 FIFA U-20 Women's World Cup.

== Early life ==
Suarez grew up in Charlotte, North Carolina. She began playing soccer when she was three or four. She played club soccer for Charlotte Soccer Academy, earning ECNL All-American honors in 2022. She attended Ardrey Kell High School, where she played three years of high school soccer before graduating early. She led the school to the 4A state final as a sophomore in 2022, contributing 18 goals and 12 assists though she missed part of the regular season due to youth national team selection. In her junior year in 2023, she posted 36 goals and 33 assists and led the team to win their first state championship, scoring once and assisting twice in the 3–2 victory in the final. She was named the Charlotte Observer, NCSCA, and North Carolina Gatorade Player of the Year following both her sophomore and junior seasons. She originally committed to play college soccer for the North Carolina Tar Heels before switching her commitment to the Florida State Seminoles. She was ranked by TopDrawerSoccer as the 21st-best prospect of the 2024 class, part of Florida State's top-ranked recruiting class.

== College career ==
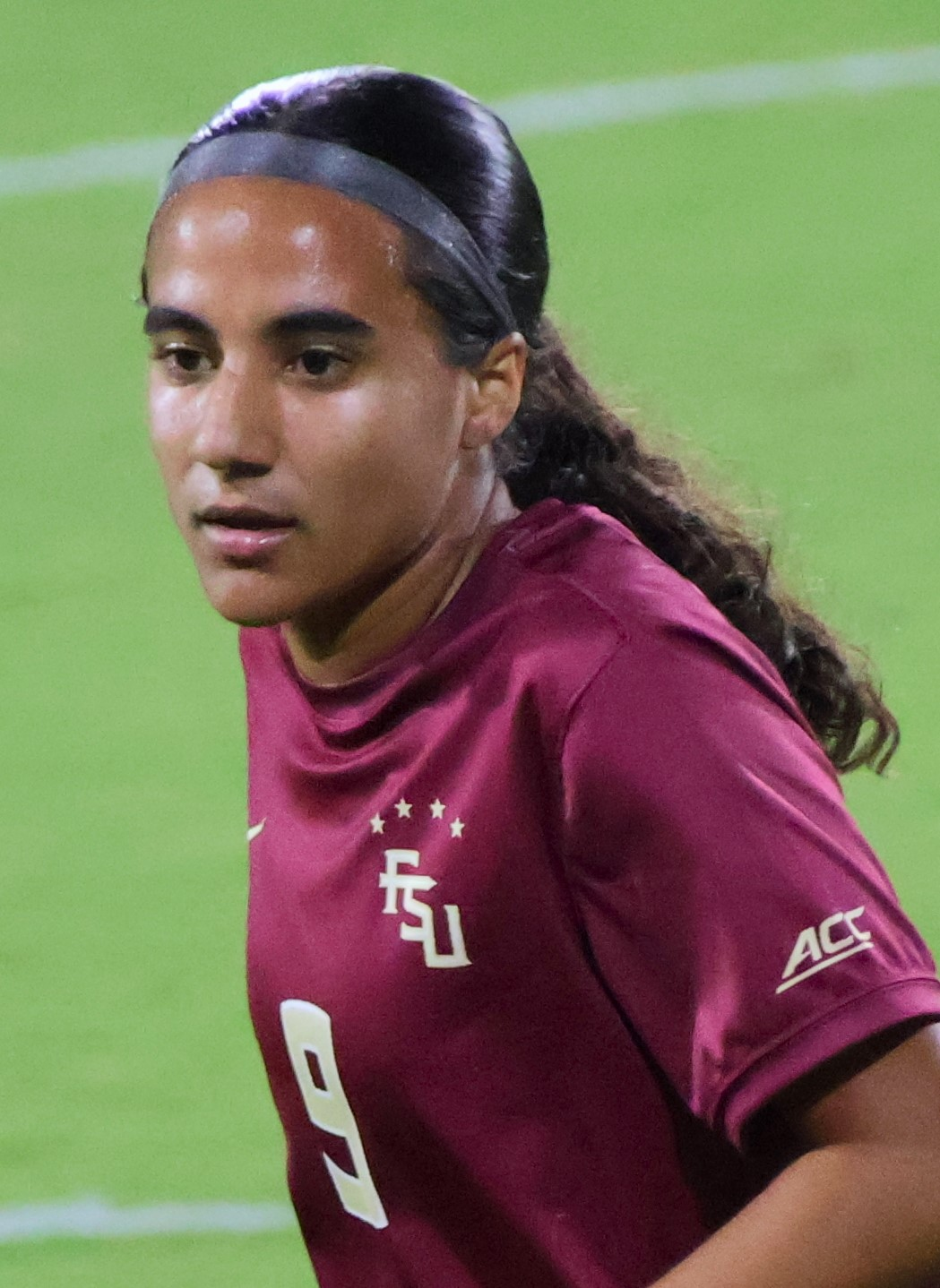
Suarez with Florida State in 2025

Suarez scored 3 goals in 14 games for the Florida State Seminoles as a freshman in 2024, missing about a month while at the 2024 FIFA U-20 Women's World Cup. In the ACC tournament final, she opened the scoring in a 3–2 victory over North Carolina. The team earned a one seed in the NCAA tournament but was upset on penalties in the second round. Suarez became a regular starter for the Seminoles as a sophomore in 2025, scoring 5 goals and adding 9 assists in 22 games. She had one goal and five assists during the NCAA tournament, including the winning assist to Wrianna Hudson in the 1–0 win over Stanford in the final, as Florida State won their fifth national title. She earned second-team All-ACC and second-team All-American recognition and was named in the NCAA all-tournament team. After her sophomore season, she announced that she would give up her remaining college eligibility and turn pro.

== Club career ==
Angel City FC announced on January 8, 2026, that they had signed Suarez to her first professional contract on a three-year deal. She made her professional debut as a second-half substitute for Kennedy Fuller in a season-opening 4–0 victory over the Chicago Stars on March 15. On August 1, she scored her first professional goal in a 1–1 draw with the Kansas City Current. On September 16, during a 3–1 win over the Seattle Reign, she scored just 21 seconds after entering the match, becoming the fastest substitute to score in NWSL history. She was named NWSL Rookie of the Month for October/November after recording two goals and two assists in that period. She finished her rookie season with 5 goals in 29 appearances in all competitions as Angel City made the playoffs for the second time in club history, losing 1–0 to the Kansas City Current in the quarterfinals.

== International career ==
Suarez received her first youth national team call-up at the United States under-17 level in November 2021. She made the roster for the 2022 CONCACAF Women's U-17 Championship following an injury to Melanie Barcenas went on to start for the team, helping the United States win the tournament with the game-winning assist against Mexico in the final. She was part of the team at the 2022 FIFA U-17 Women's World Cup, where they lost on penalties in the quarterfinals. She trained with the combined under-18/under-19 teams in 2023 and the under-20 team in 2024. She was selected to the roster for the 2024 FIFA U-20 Women's World Cup, helping the United States finish in third place, its best result since 2012.

== Personal life ==
Suarez is one of three children born to Lorie and Rick Suarez. She is of Puerto Rican and Portuguese descent. Several members of her family played college baseball, her father at Seton Hall and her brothers at Charlotte and Lenoir–Rhyne.

== Honors and awards ==
Florida State Seminoles

- NCAA Division I women's soccer tournament: 2025
- ACC women's soccer tournament: 2024

United States U-17

- CONCACAF Women's U-17 Championship: 2022

United States U-20

- FIFA U-20 Women's World Cup bronze medal: 2024

Individual

- NWSL Rookie of the Month: October/November 2026
- Second-team All-American: 2025
- Second-team All-ACC: 2025
- NCAA tournament all-tournament team: 2025
