= Florida State Seminoles women's soccer =

American college soccer team

- Founded: 1995; 31 years ago
- University: Florida State University
- Head coach: Brian Pensky (5th season)
- Conference: ACC
- Location: Tallahassee, Florida, US
- Stadium: Seminole Soccer Complex (capacity: 1,600)
- Nickname: Seminoles
- Colors: Garnet and gold
| Home | Away |

NCAA tournament championships
- 2014, 2018, 2021, 2023, 2025

NCAA tournament runner-up
- 2007, 2013, 2020

NCAA tournament College Cup
- 2003, 2005, 2006, 2007, 2011, 2012, 2013, 2014, 2015, 2018, 2020, 2021, 2022, 2023, 2025

NCAA tournament Quarterfinals
- 2003, 2005, 2006, 2007, 2008, 2009, 2010, 2011, 2012, 2013, 2014, 2015, 2018, 2019, 2020, 2021, 2022, 2023, 2025

NCAA tournament Round of 16
- 2000, 2002, 2003, 2005, 2006, 2007, 2008, 2009, 2010, 2011, 2012, 2013, 2014, 2015, 2017, 2018, 2019, 2020, 2021, 2022, 2023, 2025

NCAA tournament Round of 32
- 2000, 2001, 2002, 2003, 2005, 2006, 2007, 2008, 2009, 2010, 2011, 2012, 2013, 2014, 2015, 2016, 2017, 2018, 2019, 2020, 2021, 2022, 2023, 2024, 2025, 2026

NCAA tournament appearances
- 2000, 2001, 2002, 2003, 2004, 2005, 2006, 2007, 2008, 2009, 2010, 2011, 2012, 2013, 2014, 2015, 2016, 2017, 2018, 2019, 2020, 2021, 2022, 2023, 2024, 2025, 2026

Conference tournament championships
- 2011, 2013, 2014, 2015 2016, 2018, 2020, 2021, 2022, 2023, 2024

Conference regular season championships
- 2009, 2012, 2014, 2020, 2022, 2023

The Florida State Seminoles women's soccer team represents Florida State University (FSU) in collegiate soccer. Competing at the Division I level of the National Collegiate Athletic Association (NCAA), the team is also a member of the Atlantic Coast Conference (ACC).

The Seminoles have won the regular season conference title six times and the conference tournament eleven times. Florida State has made twenty-seven NCAA Tournament appearances, advancing to the second round on twenty-six occasions, the third round on twenty-two occasions, and to the quarterfinals on nineteen occasions. Florida State has gone on to make fifteen appearances in the College Cup, advancing to the final on eight occasions, finishing as runner-up in 2007, 2013, and 2020 and champions in 2014, 2018, 2021, 2023 and 2025.

Florida State has had fifty-six All-American honors from thirty-six players and three Hermann Trophy winners. Florida State has also had twenty-eight players selected in the NWSL College Draft, with eleven first-round picks.

The Seminoles are coached by Brian Pensky and play their home games in the Seminole Soccer Complex on the university's Tallahassee, Florida campus.

== History ==
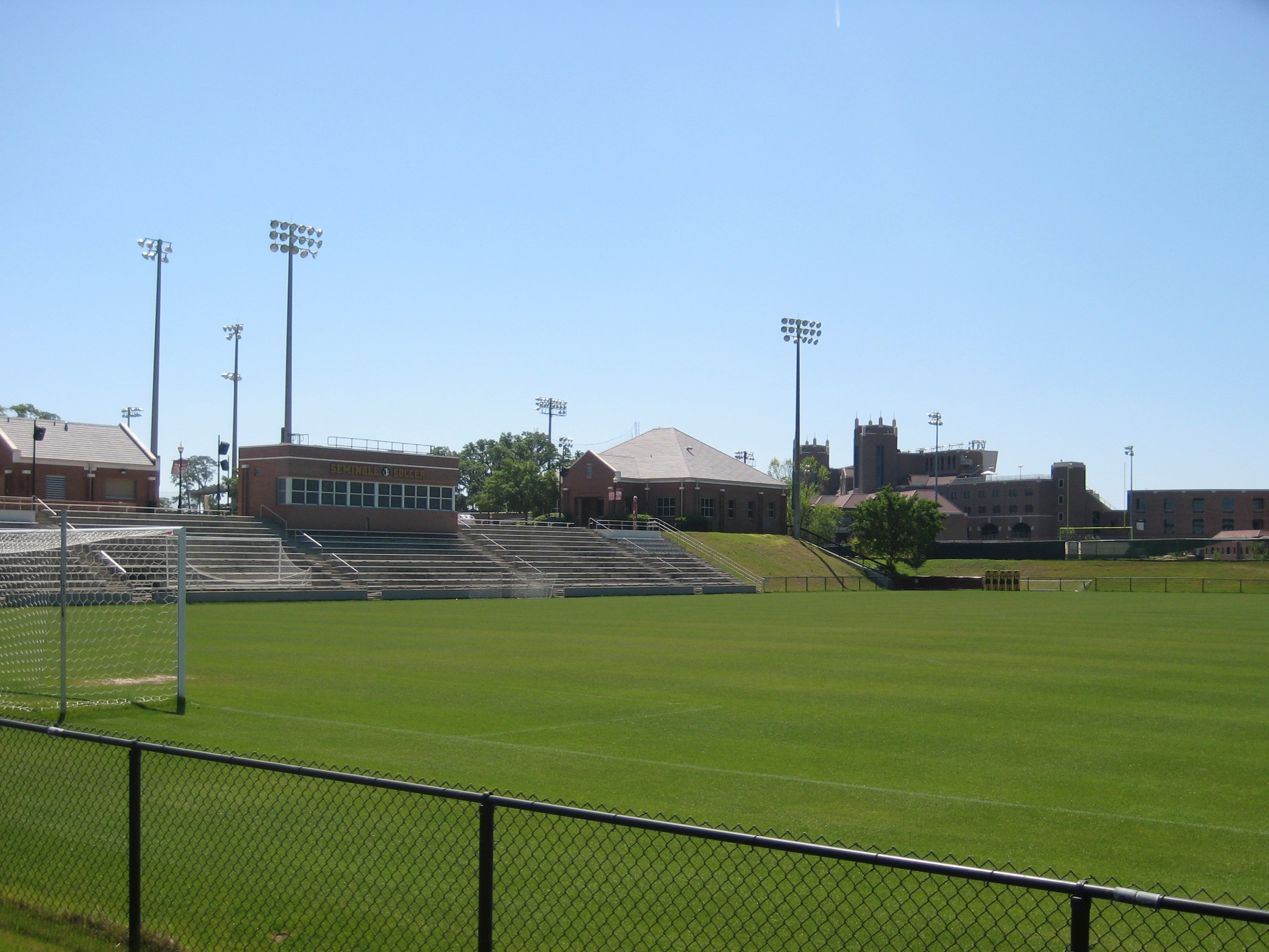
Florida State plays home games at the Seminole Soccer Complex.

The Florida State Seminoles have one of the top women's soccer programs in the nation. The university added women's soccer as its seventeenth varsity sport in 1998, and have qualified for the NCAA tournament every year since 2000, appearing in the Women's College Cup tournament fourteen times since 2003. In final season rankings, they were ranked in the top 10 for nineteen consecutive seasons, from 2005 to 2023.

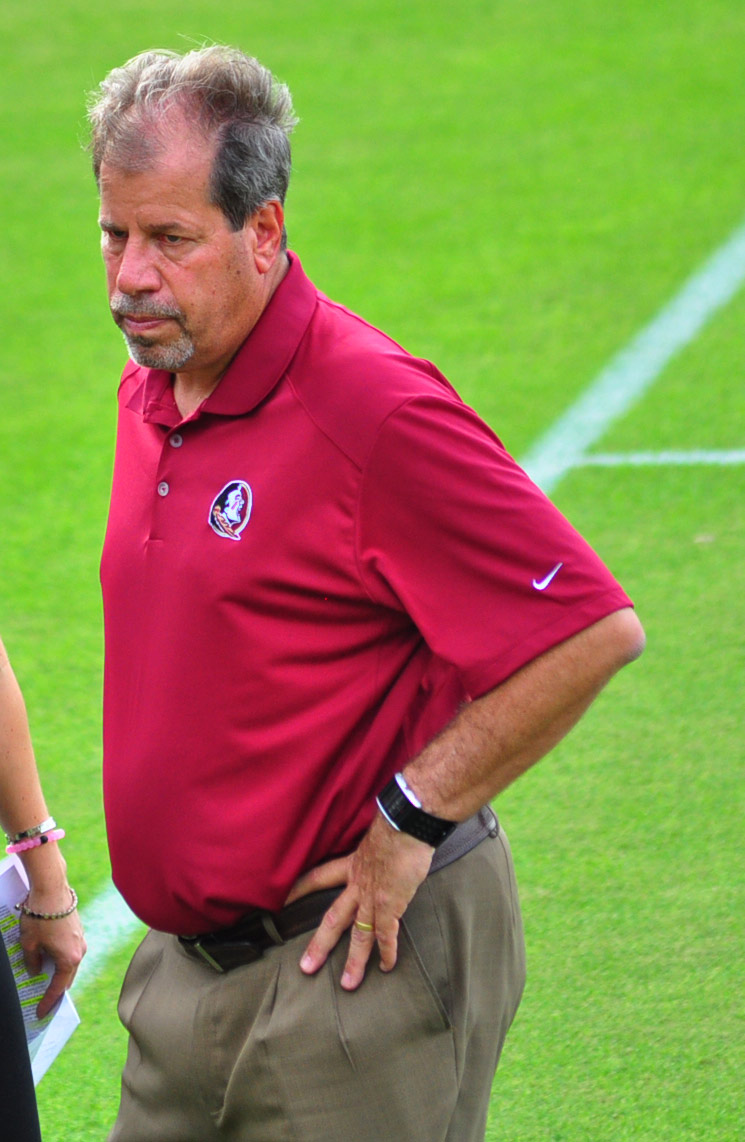
Mark Krikorian is the most successful coach in school history.

Florida State finished the 2007, 2013, and 2020 seasons as national runner-up with a second-place finish in the polls. The Seminoles finished first in the polls in 2014, 2018, 2021, 2023, and 2025, winning the national title. The Seminoles had their first undefeated regular season in 2020 and completed their first undefeated season in 2023. On March 29, 2022, Mark Krikorian resigned as head coach; Tennessee coach Brian Pensky was subsequently hired as his replacement. Pensky experienced immediate success with the Seminoles, leading the team to the College Cup in his first season, following that semifinal appearance with the team's fourth national championship in 2023, finishing with an undefeated record, and another national title in 2025.

== Current roster ==
As of November 2026

Note: Flags indicate national team as defined under FIFA eligibility rules; some limited exceptions apply. Players may hold more than one non-FIFA nationality.

| No. | Pos. | Nation | Player |
|---|---|---|---|
| 1 | GK | USA | Kate Ockene |
| 2 | DF | USA | Ryana Dill |
| 3 | FW | USA | Jaida McGrew |
| 4 | DF | USA | Kai Price |
| 5 | DF | CAN | Bridget Mutipula |
| 6 | MF | BRA | Lara Dantas |
| 7 | MF | USA | Nyanya Touray |
| 8 | DF | CAN | Janet Okeke |
| 9 | FW | USA | Tanner Strickland |
| 10 | MF | USA | Ashley Henderson |
| 11 | MF | JAM | Shaneil Buckley |
| 12 | MF | USA | Peyton McGovern |
| 15 | FW | ENG | Anniyah Gordon Rodney |
| 16 | FW | ENG | Sammy Kaczmar |

| No. | Pos. | Nation | Player |
|---|---|---|---|
| 17 | DF | USA | Grace Hoytink |
| 18 | GK | BRA | Fernanda Mayrink |
| 19 | FW | CAN | Nyah Rose |
| 20 | MF | USA | Joelle Jung |
| 21 | MF | USA | Nawreen Ahmad |
| 22 | DF | USA | Claire Rain |
| 24 | FW | USA | Anaiyah Robinson |
| 26 | MF | USA | Sam Erbach |
| 28 | DF | USA | Olivia Page |
| 38 | GK | USA | Savannah Dixon |
| 42 | FW | USA | Wrianna Hudson |
| 50 | MF | USA | Omotara Junaid |
| 99 | FW | USA | Ryder Ajeto |

== All-Time record ==
=== Season-by-season results ===
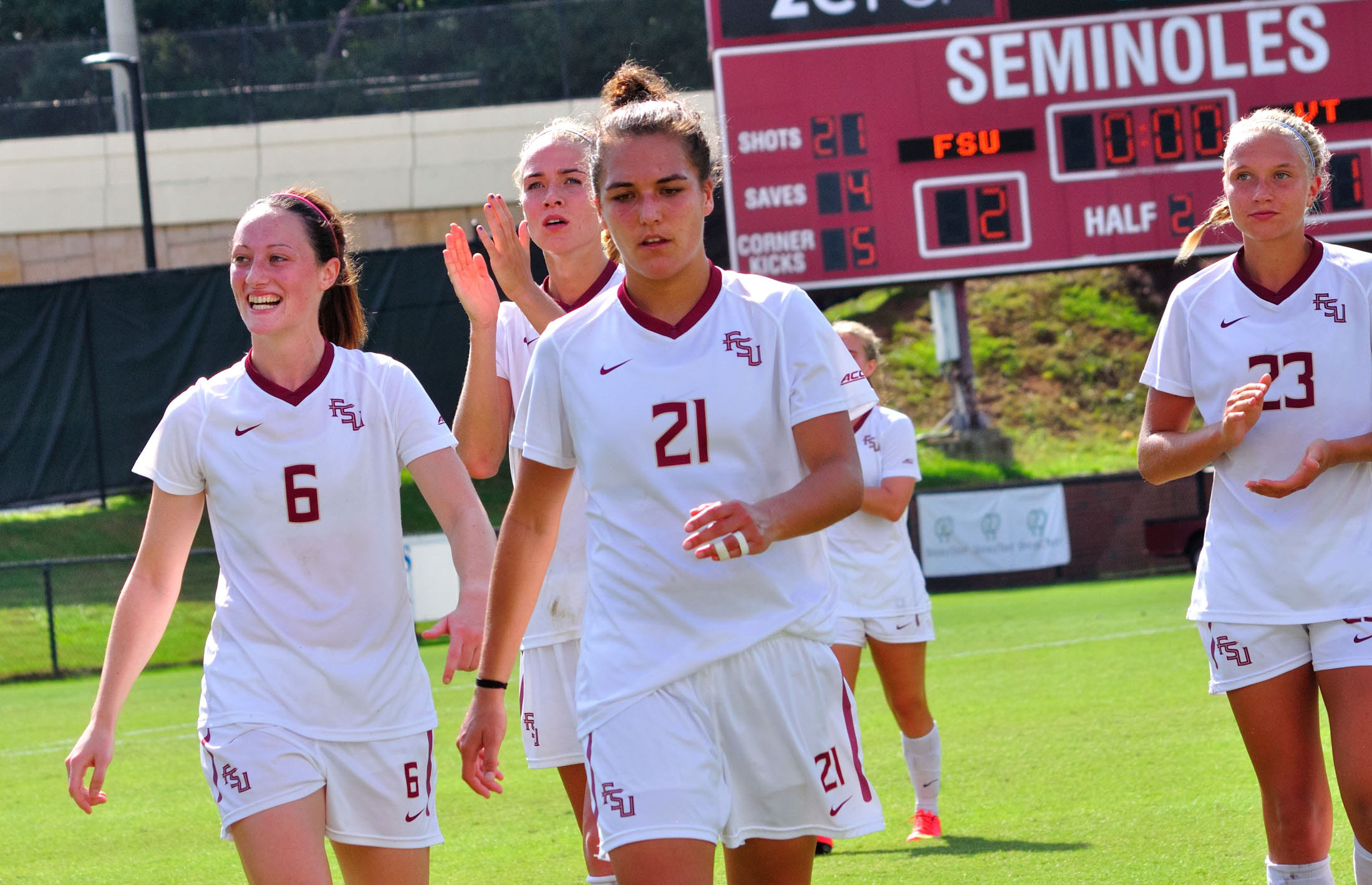
Soccer was officially recognized by the university as a varsity sport beginning with the 1998 season

| Year | Head coach | Overall | Conference |
|---|---|---|---|
| 1995 | Heather Kerby | 4–14–1 | 0–7–0 |
| 1996 | Heather Kerby | 12–7–1 | 2–5–0 |
| 1997 | Heather Kerby | 8-12–0 | 0–7–0 |
| 1998 | Heather Kerby | 7–11–3 | 1–5–1 |
| 1999 | Patrick Baker | 9–10–1 | 0–6–1 |
| 2000 | Patrick Baker | 14–8–2 | 2–4–1 |
| 2001 | Patrick Baker | 15–8–1 | 4–3–0 |
| 2002 | Patrick Baker | 13–7–3 | 3–3–1 |
| 2003 | Patrick Baker | 17–8–1 | 4–2–1 |
| 2004 | Patrick Baker | 12–5–3 | 5–3–1 |
| 2005 | Mark Krikorian | 20–4–1 | 8–2–0 |
| 2006 | Mark Krikorian | 18–4–4 | 5–2–3 |
| 2007 | Mark Krikorian | 18–6–3 | 6–2–2 |
| 2008 | Mark Krikorian | 17–3–3 | 8–1–1 |
| 2009 | Mark Krikorian | 19–5–1 | 7–2–1 |
| 2010 | Mark Krikorian | 16–6–1 | 7–2–1 |
| 2011 | Mark Krikorian | 18–7–1 | 5–5–0 |
| 2012 | Mark Krikorian | 20–4–0 | 8–2–0 |
| 2013 | Mark Krikorian | 23–2–3 | 10–1–2 |
| 2014 | Mark Krikorian | 24–1–1 | 9–0–1 |
| 2015 | Mark Krikorian | 18–3–4 | 6–1–3 |
| 2016 | Mark Krikorian | 14–4–4 | 6–2–2 |
| 2017 | Mark Krikorian | 13–7–1 | 5–4–1 |
| 2018 | Mark Krikorian | 20–4–3 | 5–4–1 |
| 2019 | Mark Krikorian | 18–6–0 | 8–2–0 |
| 2020 | Mark Krikorian | 13–0–3 | 8–0–0 |
| 2021 | Mark Krikorian | 21–1–3 | 7–1–2 |
| 2022 | Brian Pensky | 17–3–3 | 8–2–0 |
| 2023 | Brian Pensky | 22–0–1 | 9–0–1 |
| 2024 | Brian Pensky | 15–2–4 | 7–2–1 |
| 2025 | Brian Pensky | 16–2–4 | 6–2–2 |
| 2026 | Brian Pensky | 10–4–3 | 5–2–2 |
| Record | | 501–168–67 (.726) | 174–86–32 (.651) |

=== Record vs. ACC teams ===
| Opponent | Won | Lost | Tie | Percentage | Streak | First Meeting |
|---|---|---|---|---|---|---|
| Boston College | 18 | 3 | 3 | .813 | Won 5 | 2004 |
| California | 1 | 0 | 1 | .750 | Tied 1 | 2009 |
| Clemson | 26 | 8 | 4 | .737 | Won 10 | 1995 |
| Duke | 19 | 10 | 8 | .622 | Won 3 | 1995 |
| Louisville | 11 | 0 | 1 | .958 | Tied 1 | 2001 |
| Miami | 22 | 4 | 0 | .846 | Won 7 | 1998 |
| North Carolina | 15 | 31 | 6 | .346 | Won 3 | 1995 |
| NC State | 19 | 3 | 5 | .796 | Tied 2 | 1995 |
| Notre Dame | 10 | 6 | 0 | .625 | Lost 2 | 2006 |
| Pittsburgh | 16 | 0 | 0 | 1.000 | Won 16 | 2013 |
| SMU | 1 | 0 | 1 | .750 | Tied 1 | 2021 |
| Stanford | 4 | 4 | 0 | .500 | Won 1 | 2010 |
| Syracuse | 8 | 0 | 1 | .944 | Won 5 | 1998 |
| Virginia | 12 | 22 | 9 | .384 | Lost 1 | 1995 |
| Virginia Tech | 21 | 2 | 2 | .880 | Lost 2 | 2002 |
| Wake Forest | 16 | 13 | 6 | .543 | Won 2 | 1995 |
| Totals | 219 | 107 | 46 | .651 | | |

=== Record vs. rivals ===
| Opponent | Won | Lost | Tie | Percentage | Streak | First Meeting |
|---|---|---|---|---|---|---|
| Florida | 18 | 14 | 0 | .563 | Lost 1 | 1995 |
| Miami | 22 | 4 | 0 | .846 | Won 7 | 1998 |
| Totals | 40 | 18 | 0 | .690 | | |

=== Head coaching records ===
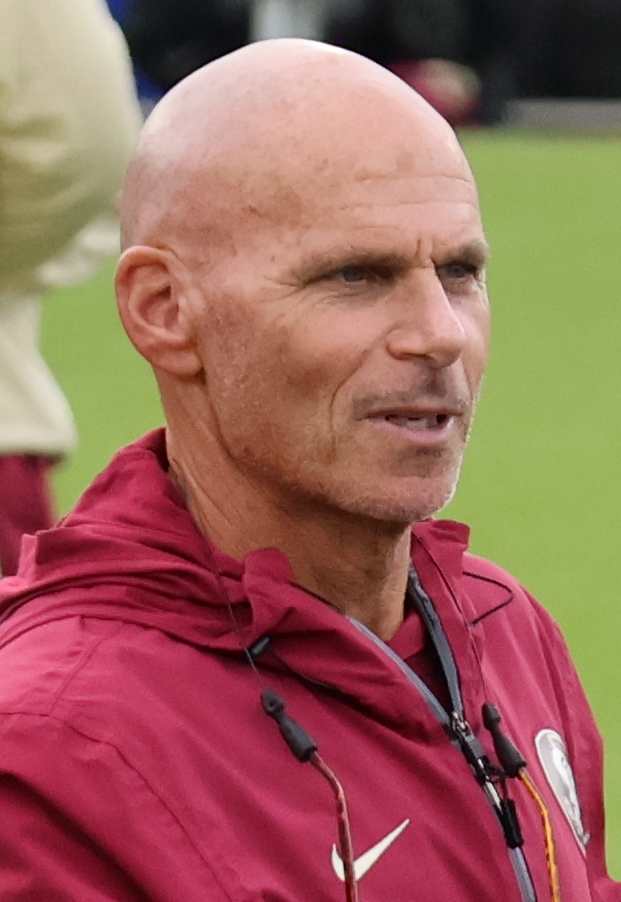
Brian Pensky is the current head coach of the Seminoles.

| Tenure | Coach | Years | Record | Pct. |
|---|---|---|---|---|
| 1995–1998 | Heather Kerby | 4 | 31–44–5 | .419 |
| 1999–2004 | Patrick Baker | 6 | 80–46–11 | .624 |
| 2005–2021 | Mark Krikorian | 17 | 310–67–36 | .794 |
| 2022–present | Brian Pensky | 5 | 80–11–15 | .825 |
| Totals | 4 coaches | 32 seasons | 501–168–67 | .726 |

== College Cup ==
The Seminoles have appeared in the College Cup a total of fifteen times, the second most appearances of any ACC school and second-most nationally behind UNC.

| Year | Result |
|---|---|
| 2003 | Finalist |
| 2005 | Finalist |
| 2006 | Finalist |
| 2007 | Runner-Up |
| 2011 | Finalist |
| 2012 | Finalist |
| 2013 | Runner-Up |
| 2014 | Champion |
| 2015 | Finalist |
| 2018 | Champion |
| 2020 | Runner-Up |
| 2021 | Champion |
| 2022 | Finalist |
| 2023 | Champion |
| 2025 | Champion |

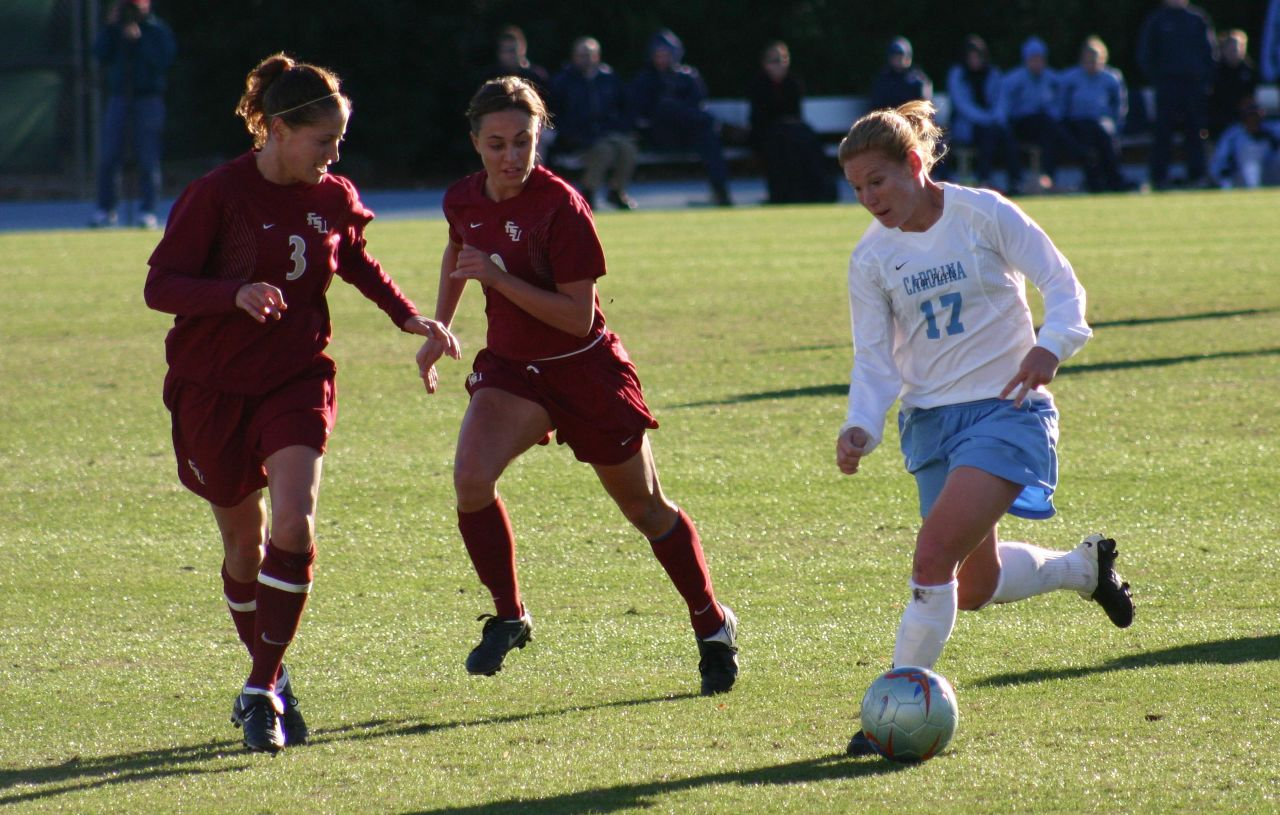
Florida State has become one of the most decorated programs in college soccer.

Florida State has made eight appearances in the National Championship game; the Seminoles have the second-most national titles, trailing only UNC.

| Season | Coach | Result |
|---|---|---|
| 2007 | Mark Krikorian | FSU 0, USC 2 |
| 2013 | Mark Krikorian | FSU 0, UCLA 1 (OT) |
| 2014 | Mark Krikorian | FSU 1, Virginia 0 |
| 2018 | Mark Krikorian | FSU 1, North Carolina 0 |
| 2020 | Mark Krikorian | FSU 1, Santa Clara 1 (1–4 PK) |
| 2021 | Mark Krikorian | FSU 0, BYU 0 (4–3 PK) |
| 2023 | Brian Pensky | FSU 5, Stanford 1 |
| 2025 | Brian Pensky | FSU 1, Stanford 0 |

== Awards ==
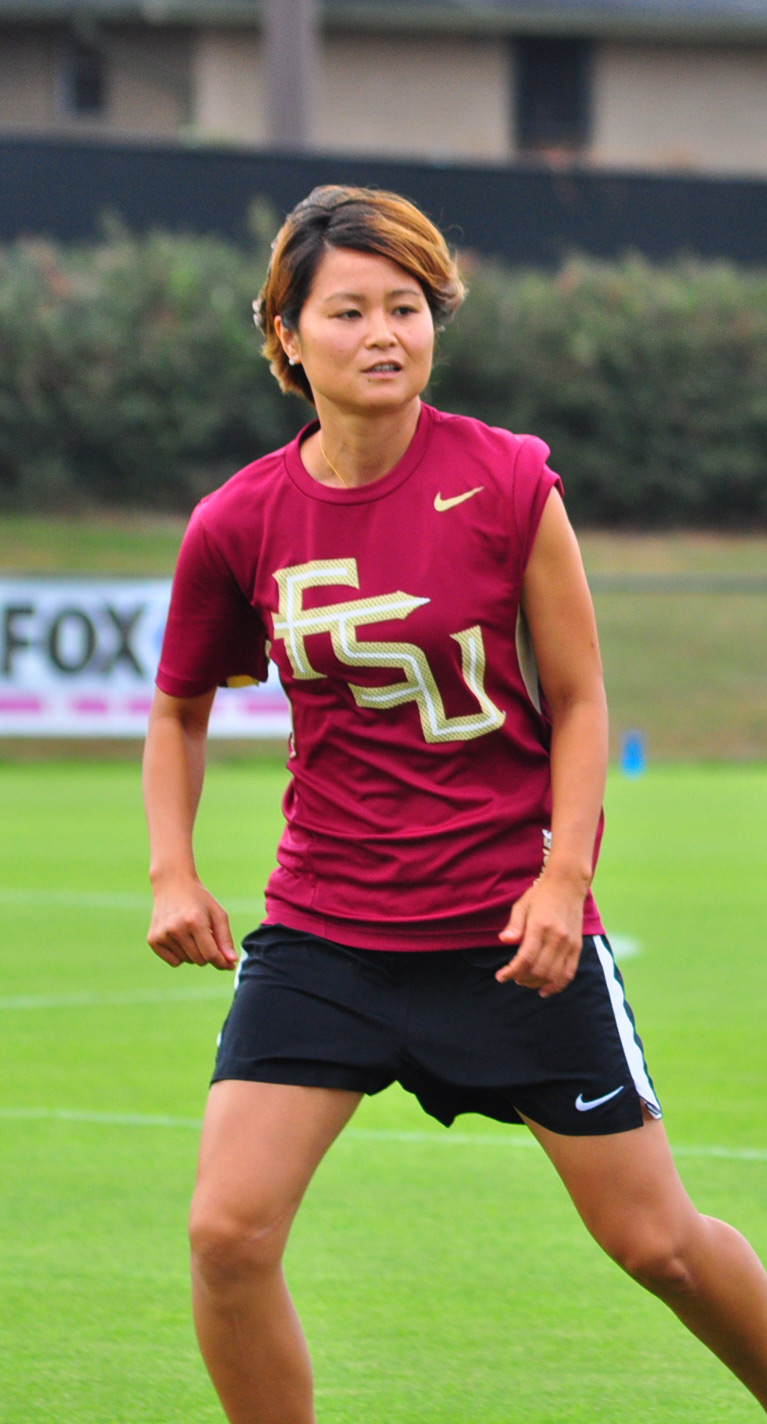
Mami Yamaguchi was the first Florida State player to win the Hermann Trophy.

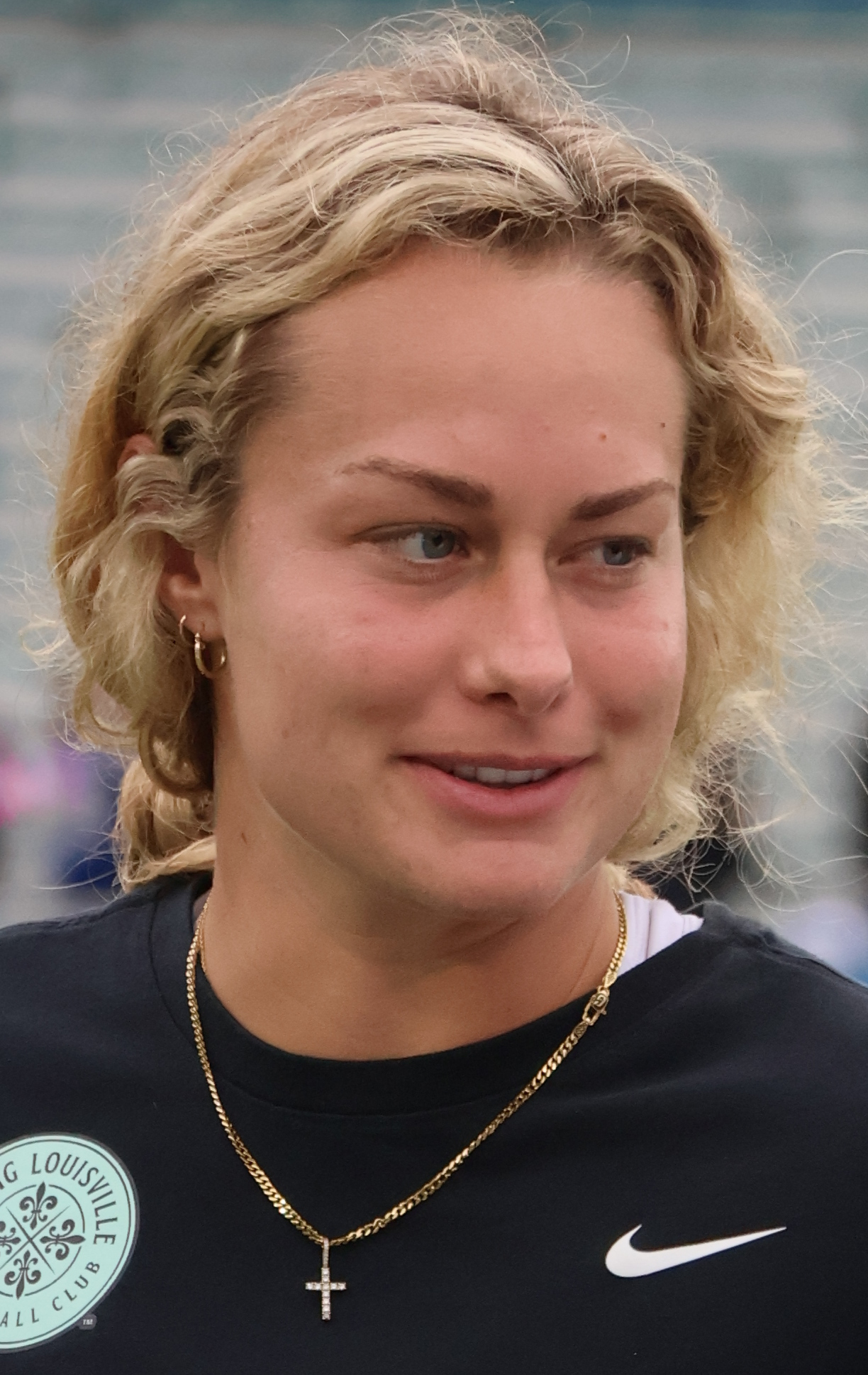
Jaelin Howell is the only Florida State player to win the Hermann Trophy twice.

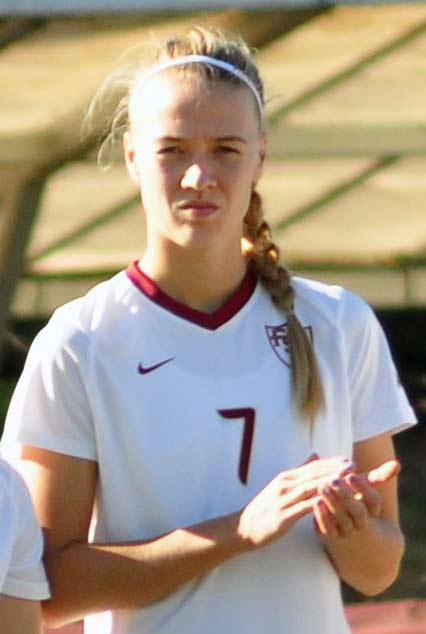
Dagny Brynjarsdottir finished as runner-up for the Hermann Trophy in 2014.

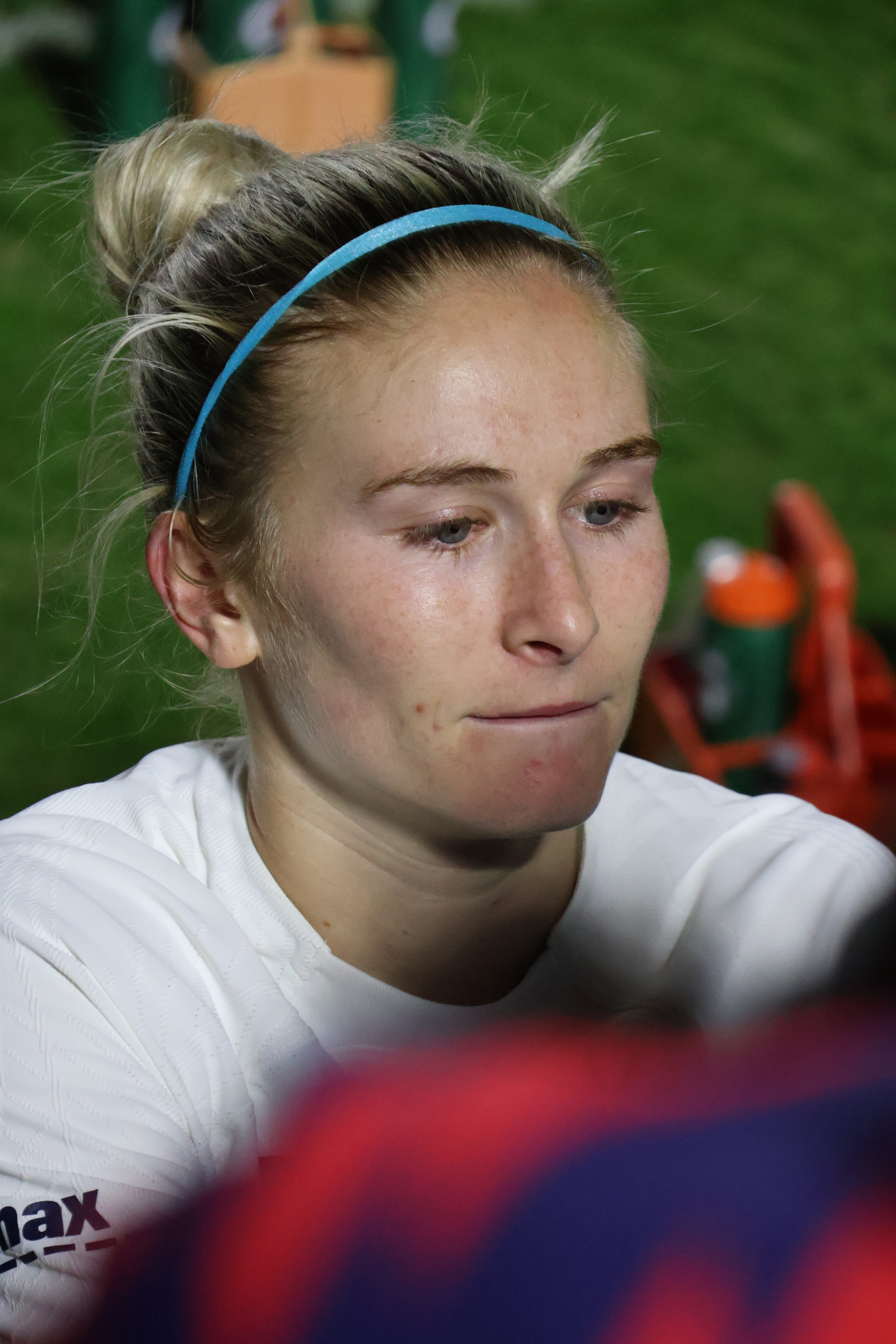
Jenna Nighswonger finished as runner-up for the Hermann Trophy in 2022.

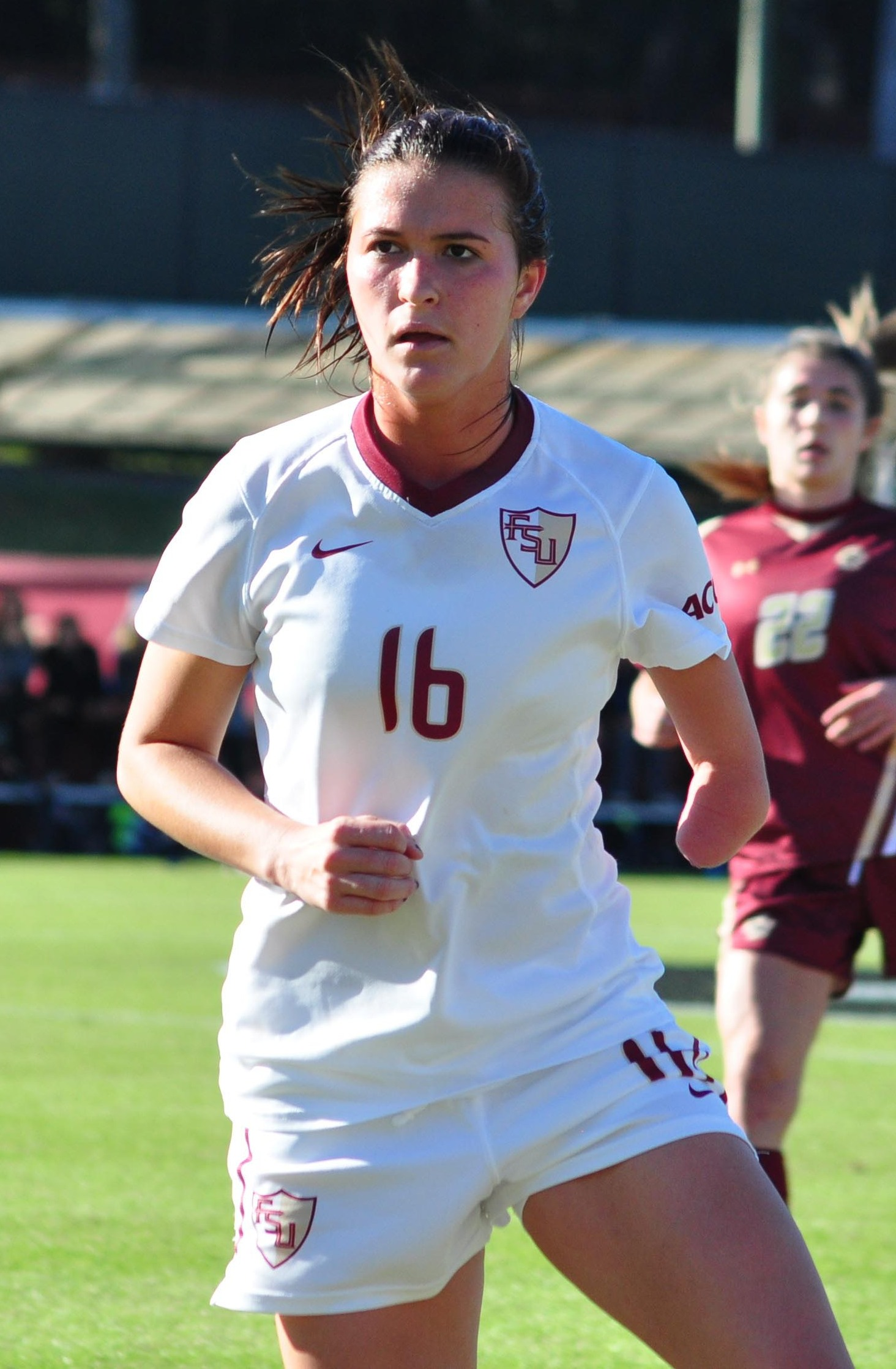
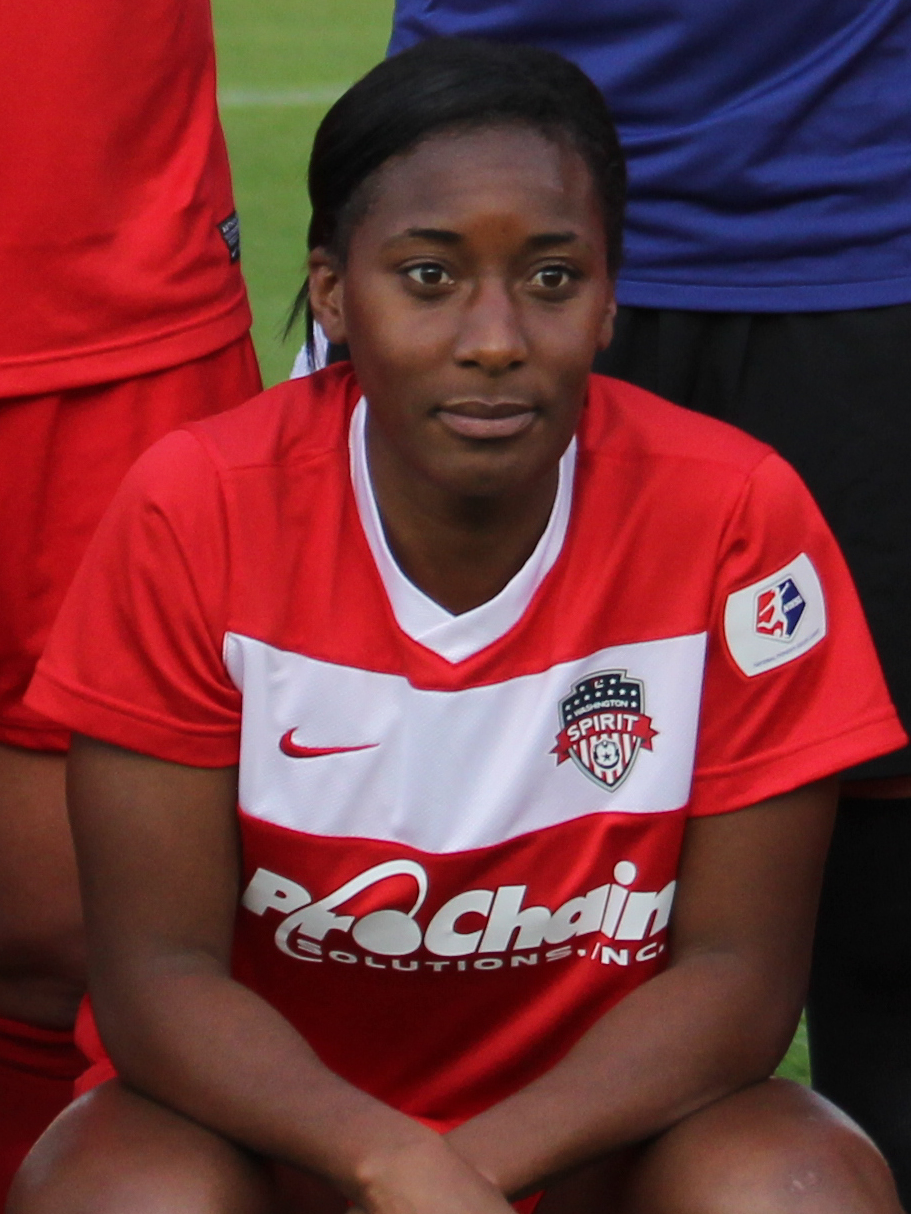
Carson Pickett (left) and Tiffany McCarty (right) received multiple accolades during their time as Seminoles
- The Best FIFA Women's Player
  - Deyna Castellanos - 2017 third place
- Hermann Trophy
  - Mami Yamaguchi - 2007 Winner
  - Dagný Brynjarsdóttir - 2014 Runner-Up
  - Jaelin Howell - 2020 & 2021 Winner
  - Jenna Nighswonger - 2022 Runner-Up
  - Onyi Echegini - 2023 Winner
  - Jordynn Dudley - 2025 Finalist
- MAC Player of the Year
  - Mami Yamaguchi (2007)
  - Jaelin Howell (2020, 2021)
- Honda Sports Award (Soccer)
  - Natalia Kuikka (2018)
  - Jaelin Howell (2021)
  - Onyi Echegini (2023)
  - Jordynn Dudley (2025)
- All-Americans
  - First Team: Kelly Rowland (2006), India Trotter (2006), Mami Yamaguchi (2007), Amanda DaCosta (2008), Becky Edwards (2008, 2009), Tiffany McCarty (2009), Ines Jaurena (2012), Kassey Kallman (2013), Dagný Brynjarsdóttir (2014), Kristin Grubka (2014), Megan Connolly (2015), Cassie Miller (2016), Deyna Castellanos (2019), Jaelin Howell (2020, 2021), Malia Berkely (2020), Emily Madril (2021), Jenna Nighswonger (2022), Onyi Echegini (2023), Jordynn Dudley (2023, 2025), Taylor Huff (2024)
  - Second Team: India Trotter (2005), Selin Kuralay (2006), Sanna Talonen (2008), Sarah Wagenfuhr (2008), Ines Jaurena (2011), Tiffany McCarty (2011), Dagný Brynjarsdóttir (2013), Kirsten Crowley (2016), Deyna Castellanos (2018), Yujie Zhao (2018, 2021), Emily Madril (2021), Taylor Huff (2023), Jody Brown (2023), Jordynn Dudley (2024), Taylor Suarez (2025)
  - Third Team: Leah Gallegos (2003), Amanda DaCosta (2010), Tori Huster (2011), Tiffany McCarty (2012), Kelsey Wys (2012), Cheyna Williams (2014), Natalia Kuikka (2016, 2018), Yujie Zhao (2020), Cristina Roque (2022, 2023), Jody Brown (2022), Heather Gilchrist (2025)
  - Fourth Team: Toni Pressley (2010), Heather Gilchrist (2024)
- All-ACC Players
  - First Team: Emma Breeland (2000), Cindy Schofield (2001, 2002), Kristin Boyce (2003), Leah Gallegos (2003), Joy McKenzie (2004), India Trotter (2004, 2005, 2006), Selin Kuralay (2005, 2006), Viola Odebrecht (2005), Katrin Schmidt (2006), Mami Yamaguchi (2007), Amanda DaCosta (2008, 2010), Sanna Talnen (2008), Sarah Wagenfuhr (2008), Becky Edwards (2009), Tiffany McCarty (2009), Toni Pressley (2010), Tori Huster (2010), Ines Jaurena (2011), Kassey Kallman (2012, 2013), Kelsey Wys (2012), Dagný Brynjarsdóttir (2013, 2014), Kristin Grubka (2013, 2014), Megan Connolly (2015), Cheyna Williams (2015), Kirsten Crowley (2016), Deyna Castellanos (2017, 2018), Natalia Kuikka (2017), Yujie Zhao (2018, 2020, 2021), Malia Berkely (2020), Jaelin Howell (2020, 2021), Emily Madril (2021), Jenna Nighswonger (2022), Jody Brown (2022, 2023), Cristina Roque (2022), Jordynn Dudley (2023, 2024, 2025), Onyi Echegini (2023), Taylor Huff (2024)
  - Second Team: Melissa Juhl (1996), Amber Tollefson (2001), Kelly Rowland (2004, 2006), Julia Schnugg (2004), Amanda DaCosta (2007, 2009), Becky Edwards (2008), Toni Pressley (2009), Jessica Price (2009), Tori Huster (2010), Ines Jaurena (2010), Kassey Kallman (2010), Kelsey Wys (2010, 2013), Casey Short (2010, 2012), Tiffany McCarty (2012), Dagný Brynjarsdóttir (2012), Megan Campbell (2013, 2015), Jamia Fields (2014), Cassie Miller (2014, 2015, 2016), Kirsten Crowley (2015), Deyna Castellanos (2016), Megan Connolly (2016), Natalia Kuikka (2016, 2018), Jaelin Howell (2018), Emily Madril (2020), Clara Robbins (2020, 2021, 2022), Cristina Roque (2020, 2023), Gabby Carle (2021), Beata Olsson (2021), Onyi Echegini (2022), Leilanni Nesbeth (2022, 2023), Taylor Huff (2023), Wrianna Hudson (2025, 2026), Taylor Suarez (2025)
  - Third Team: Isabella Schmidt (2014), Berglind Thorvaldsdottir (2014), Emma Koivisto (2015, 2016), Carson Pickett (2015), Michaela Hahn (2015), Gloriana Villalobos (2017), Malia Berkely (2018), Jenna Nighswonger (2020), Jody Brown (2021), Heather Payne (2022), Beata Olssen (2022, 2023), Heather Gilchrist (2024, 2025), Amelia Van Zanten (2024, 2025)
  - Freshman Team: Megan Connolly (2015), Kaycie Tillman (2015), Natalia Kuikka (2015), Malia Berkely (2016), Deyna Castellanos (2016), Kristen McFarland (2016), Gloriana Villalobos (2017), Yujie Zhao (2018), Jaelin Howell (2018), Jody Brown (2020), Kaitlyn Zipay (2020), Cristina Roque (2020), Maria Alagoa (2021), Mia Justus (2021), Heather Gilchrist (2022), Jordynn Dudley (2023), Amelia Van Zanten (2023), Wrianna Hudson (2024), Solai Washington, (2024), Bridget Mutipula (2026)
- ACC Offensive Player of the Year
  - Mami Yamaguchi (2007)
  - Tiffany McCarty (2009)
  - Dagný Brynjarsdóttir (2014)
  - Deyna Castellanos (2019)
  - Onyi Echegini (2023)
- ACC Defensive Player of the Year
  - Kassey Kallman (2013)
  - Kristin Grubka (2014)
  - Malia Berkely (2019, 2020)
  - Emily Madril (2021)
- ACC Midfielder of the Year
  - Megan Connolly (2015)
  - Deyna Castellanos (2019)
  - Jaelin Howell (2020, 2021)
- ACC Goalkeeper of the Year
  - Cristina Roque (2022)
- ACC Freshman of the Year
  - Tiffany McCarty (2008)
  - Megan Connolly (2015)
  - Yujie Zhao (2018)
  - Jordynn Dudley (2023)
- ACC Coach of the Year
  - Mark Krikorian (2005, 2009, 2012, 2014, 2020)
  - Brian Pensky (2023)
- NCAA College Cup - All Tournament Team
  - India Trotter (2003, 2005, 2006), Kelly Rowland (2006), Mami Yamaguchi (2007), Amanda DaCosta (2007), Sanna Talonen (2007), Tori Huster (2011), Tiffany McCarty (2012), Jamia Fields (2013, 2014), Kristin Grubka (2013, 2014), Kelsey Wys (2013), Cheyna Williams (2014), Cassie Miller (2014), Isabella Schmid (2014), Dagný Brynjarsdóttir (2014), Megan Connolly (2015), Jaelin Howell (2018), Malia Berkely (2018), Gabby Carle (2018), Dallas Dorosy (2018), Caroline Jeffers (2018), Natalia Kuikka (2018) Jenna Nighswonger (2020), Emily Madril (2020), Yujie Zhao (2020), Clara Robbins (2020), Jody Brown (2023), Taylor Huff (2023), Leilanni Nesbeth (2023), Jordynn Dudley (2023), Lauren Flynn (2023)
- NSCAA All-Region Honor
  - Melissa Juhl (1996), Emma Breland (2000), Sarah Crawford (2000), Rachel Watkin (2000), Cindy Schofield (2001, 2002), Amber Tollefson (2001), Leah Gallegos (2003), Katie Beal (2003), Kristin Boyce (2003), Joy McKenzie (2003, 2004), Kelly Rowland (2004, 2005, 2006), Julia Schnugg (2004), India Trotter (2004, 2005, 2006), Viola Odebrecht (2005), Selin Kuralay (2005, 2006), Sarah Wagenfuhr (2005, 2006, 2008), Katrin Schmidt (2006), Mami Yamaguchi (2007), Becky Edwards (2007, 2008, 2009), Amanda DaCosta (2007, 2008, 2009, 2010), Sanna Talonen (2008), Tiffany McCarty (2008, 2009, 2011, 2012), Toni Pressley (2009, 2010), Jessica Price (2009), Tori Huster (2010, 2011), Ines Jaurena (2011, 2012), Dagný Brynjarsdóttir (2012, 2013), Kassey Kallman (2012, 2013, 2014), Casey Short (2012), Kelsey Wys (2012, 2013), Kristin Grubka (2013, 2014), Megan Campbell (2013), Cheyna Williams (2014), Cassie Miller (2014, 2015, 2016), Megan Connolly (2015), Kirsten Crowley (2015, 2016), Michaela Hahn (2015), Natalia Kuikka (2016, 2018), Kaycie Tillman (2016), Deyna Castellanos (2016, 2018, 2019), Yujie Zhao (2018, 2019, 2020, 2021), Jaelin Howell (2018, 2019, 2020, 2021), Malia Berkely (2019, 2020), Emily Madril (2020, 2021), Christina Roque (2020, 2022, 2023), Beata Olsson (2021), Jenna Nighswonger (2022), Jody Brown (2022, 2023), Clara Robbins (2022), Onyi Echegini (2023), Jordynn Dudley (2023, 2025), Taylor Huff (2023), Taylor Suarez (2025), Heather Gilchrist (2025), Mimi Van Zanten (2025), Wrianna Hudson (2025)
- NSCAA Player of the Year
  - Mami Yamaguchi (2007)
  - Dagný Brynjarsdóttir (2014)
  - Jaelin Howell (2020, 2021)
- NSCAA Coach of the Year
  - Mark Krikorian (2014)
- NSCAA Assistant Coach of the Year
  - Mike Bristol (2014)
- Soccer America Women's Player of the Year
  - Dagný Brynjarsdóttir (2014)
- Soccer America Women's Coach of the Year
  - Mark Krikorian (2006, 2014)
- TopDrawer Soccer Freshman of the Year
  - Megan Connolly (2015)
  - Yujie Zhao (2018)
  - Jordynn Dudley (2023)
- TopDrawer Soccer Coach of the Year
  - Mark Krikorian (2018)
  - Brian Pensky (2023)

== Championships ==
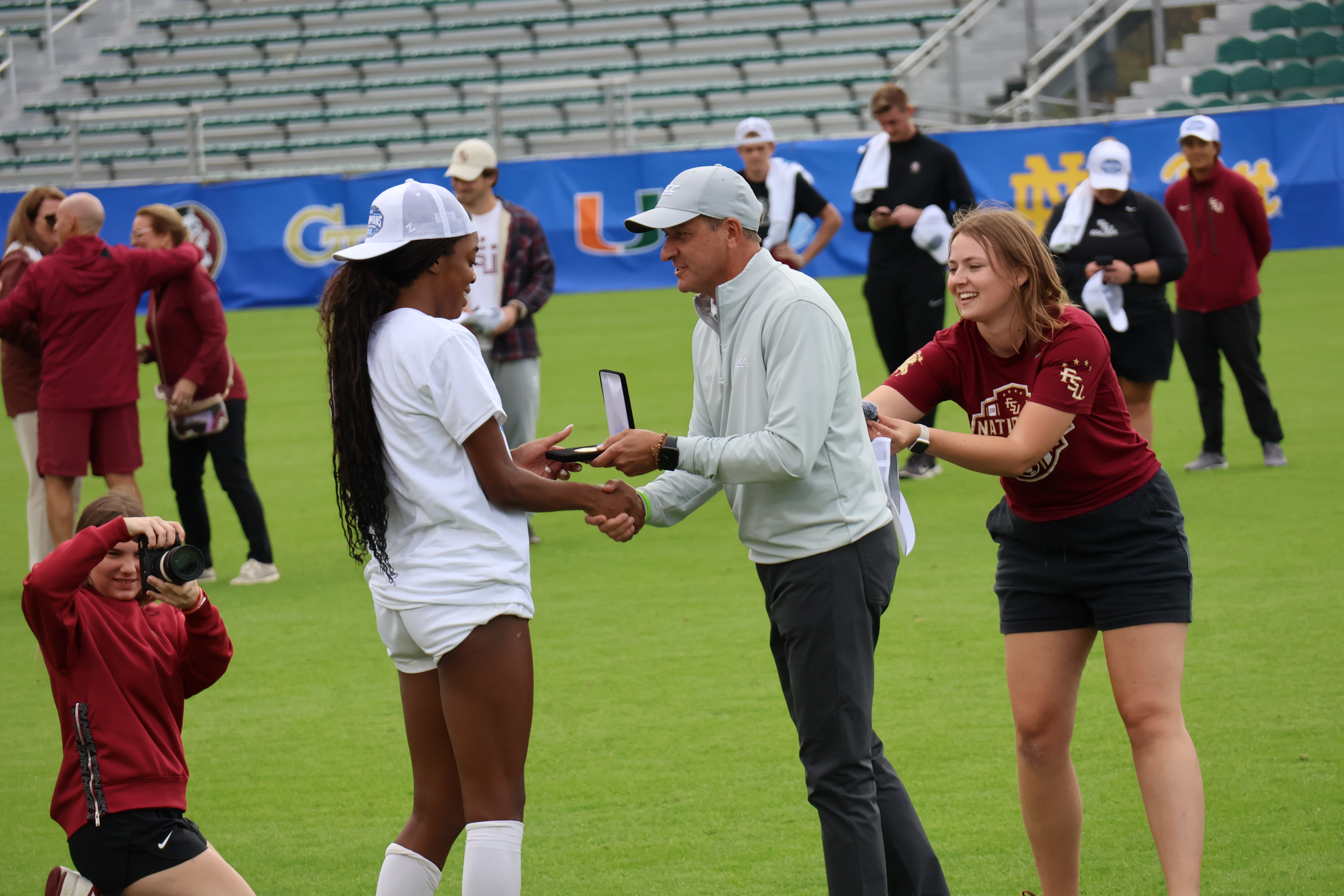
The Seminoles have won the ACC Tournament on eleven occasions, including five consecutive championships from 2020 through 2024.

=== National ===
- NCAA Division I Tournament (5): 2014, 2018, 2021, 2023, 2025

=== Conference ===
- Atlantic Coast Tournament (11): 2011, 2013, 2014, 2015, 2016, 2018, 2020, 2021, 2022, 2023, 2024

== See also ==
- Florida State Seminoles
- History of Florida State University
- List of Florida State University professional athletes
