= Solai Washington =

Jamaican footballer (born 2005)

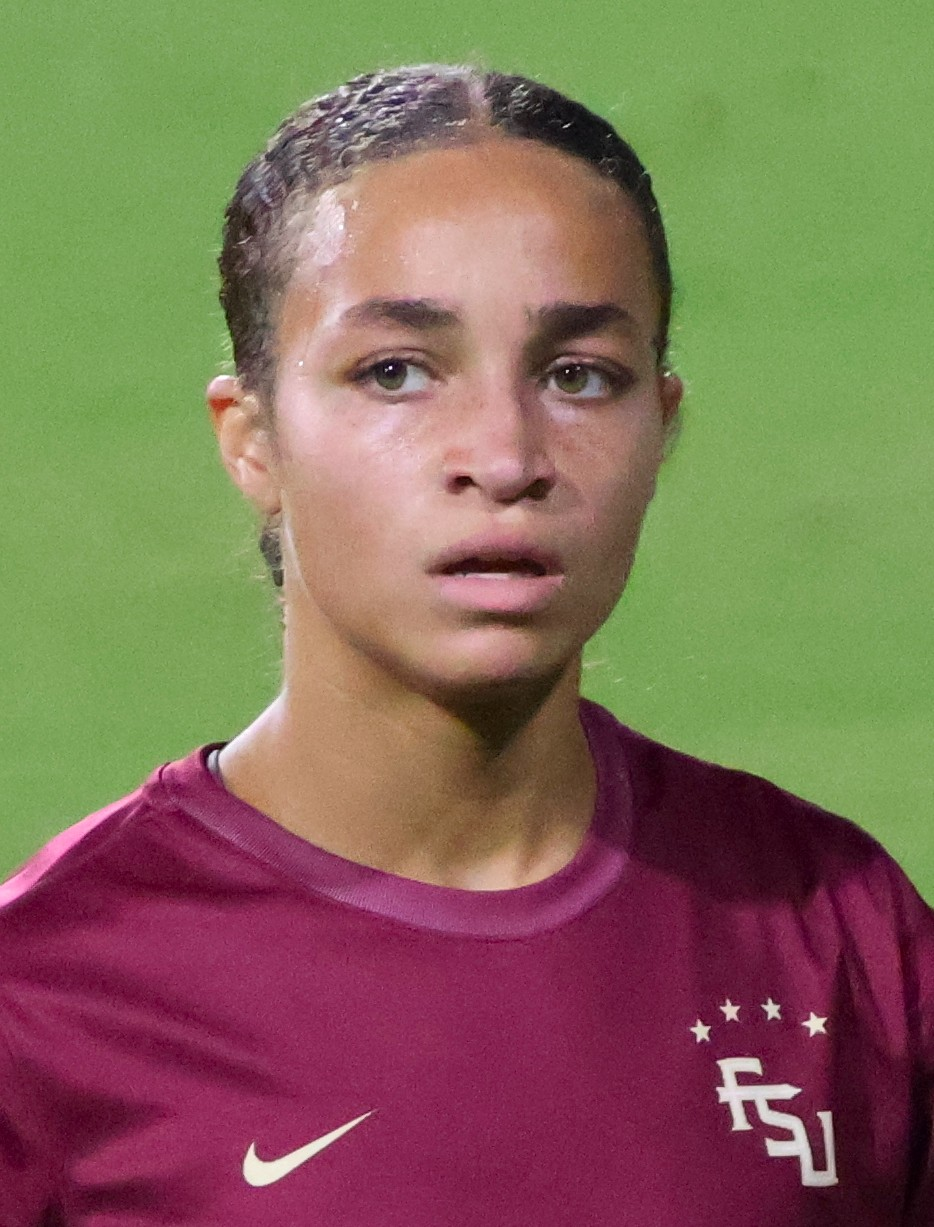
- Washington with Florida State in 2024

Personal information
- Full name: Solai Ava Washington
- Date of birth: 1 October 2005 (age 21)
- Place of birth: Atlanta, Georgia, U.S.
- Positions: Forward; attacking midfielder

Team information
- Current team: Orlando Pride
- Number: 29

Youth career
- Concorde Fire

College career
| Years | Team | Apps | (Gls) |
| 2024–2025 | Florida State Seminoles | 35 | (8) |

Senior career*
| Years | Team | Apps | (Gls) |
| 2026– | Orlando Pride | 24 | (2) |

International career^{‡}
| 2023– | Jamaica | 9 | (1) |
- * Club domestic league appearances and goals as of 03:29, 8 November 2026 (UTC) ‡ National team caps and goals as of 00:30, 13 October 2026 (UTC)

Solai Ava Washington (born 1 October 2005) is a professional footballer who plays as a forward for the Orlando Pride of the National Women's Soccer League (NWSL). Born in the United States, she represents Jamaica internationally. She played college soccer for the Florida State Seminoles, winning the 2025 national championship.

== College career ==
Washington scored six goals in her freshman season with the Florida State Seminoles in 2024, being named to the Atlantic Coast Conference (ACC) all-freshman team. She won the ACC championship with the team. She made her kick in Florida State's shootout loss to Vanderbilt in the second round of the NCAA tournament.

== Club career ==
In January 2026, Washington signed her first professional contract with the Orlando Pride on a two-year deal with the mutual option for another year. She made her Pride debut on 15 March 2026, coming on as a second-half substitute in Orlando's season-opening defeat to the Seattle Reign.

== International career ==
Washington made her debut for Jamaica against Czech Republic in February 2023. She made the squad for the 2023 Women's World Cup. She was amongst the youngest to play at the World Cup that year.

=== International goals ===
Scores and results list Jamaica's goal tally first

| No. | Date | Venue | Opponent | Score | Result | Competition |
|---|---|---|---|---|---|---|
| 1 | 9 October 2026 | Estadio Victoria, Aguascalientes, Mexico | Mexico | 4–2 | 4–3 | Friendly |

== Personal life ==
Washington is the younger sister of fellow Jamaica women's international footballer Giselle Washington. She attended Chamblee High School, in Georgia, in the class of 2024.

== Honors ==
Florida State Seminoles

- NCAA Division I women's soccer tournament: 2025
- ACC women's soccer tournament: 2024

Honors

- ACC all-freshman team: 2024
