= Taylor Huff =

American soccer player (born 2002)

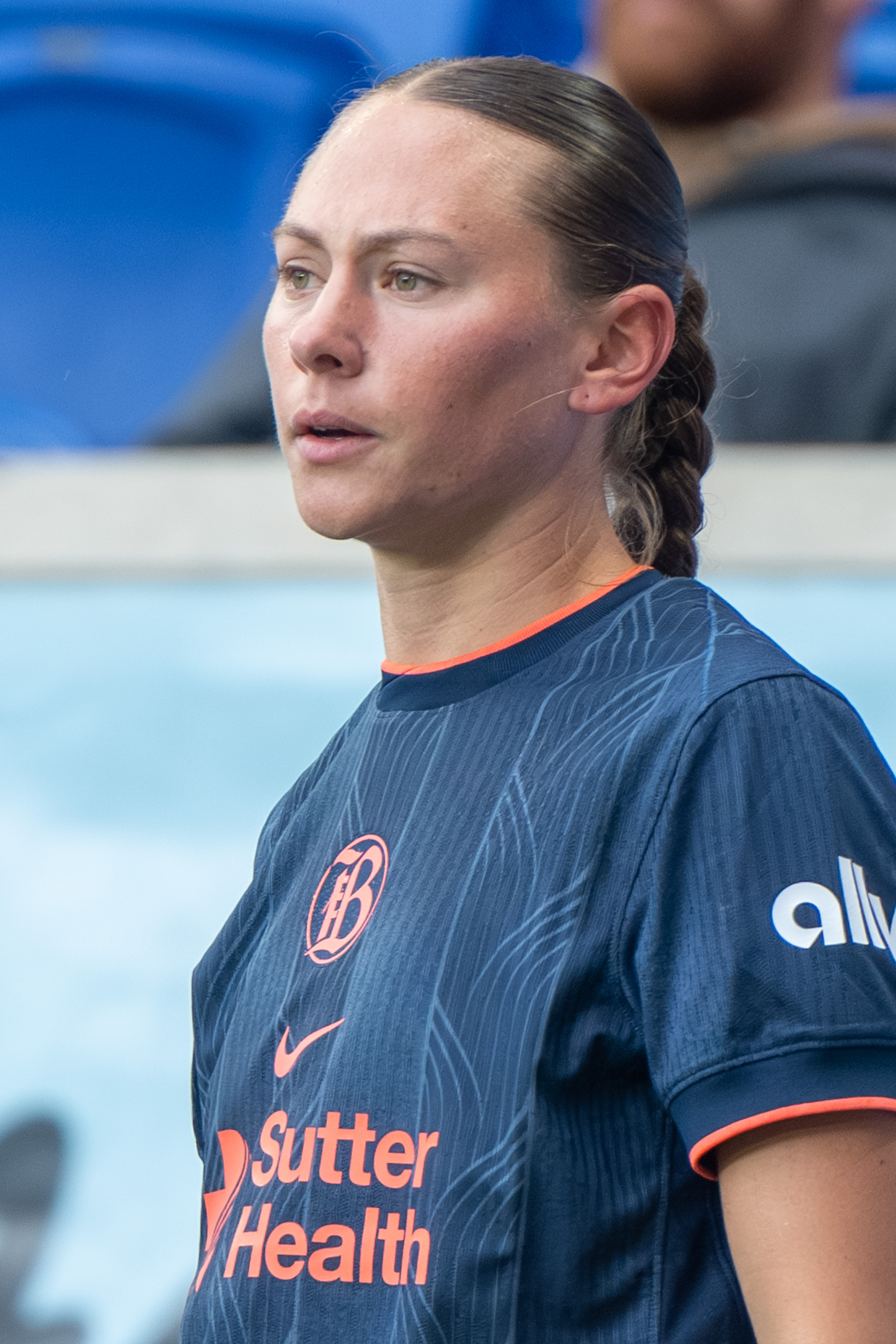
- Huff with Bay FC in 2026

Personal information
- Full name: Taylor Brooke Huff
- Date of birth: August 16, 2002 (age 24)
- Height: 5 ft 8 in (1.73 m)
- Positions: Midfielder; winger

Team information
- Current team: Bay FC
- Number: 7

College career
Years	Team	Apps	(Gls)
2021–2022	Tennessee Volunteers	41	(15)
2023–2024	Florida State Seminoles	38	(17)

Senior career*
Years	Team	Apps	(Gls)
2025–	Bay FC	48	(6)

International career^{‡}
2023–	United States U-23	5	(0)
- * Club domestic league appearances and goals as of 05:08, November 2, 2026 (UTC) ‡ National team caps and goals as of June 2, 2025

Taylor Brooke Huff (born August 16, 2002) is an American professional soccer player who plays as a midfielder or winger for Bay FC of the National Women's Soccer League (NWSL). She played college soccer for the Tennessee Volunteers and the Florida State Seminoles, winning the 2023 national championship with the latter and earning All-American honors three times.

== Early life ==
Huff was raised in Mansfield, Ohio, the middle of three daughters born to Zac and Amy Huff. She started playing soccer at age three, with her father coaching her youth and high school teams. She played multiple other sports growing up, including basketball, softball, volleyball, and track, running the 400 meters at the state championships in her senior year of high school. She played club soccer for Internationals SC.

Huff earned United Soccer Coaches All-American honors all four years at Madison Comprehensive High School. She committed to play college soccer for the Tennessee Volunteers as a freshman. She scored 34 goals with 21 assists in her freshman season in 2017, leading her team to the state semifinals, followed by 31 goals and 19 assists as a sophomore in 2018, when they were upset in regionals. She contributed 34 goals and 26 assists to help reach the state final as a junior in 2019, being named the Ohio Division II player of the year. She led Madison to victory in the state championship in 2020, recording 34 goals and 27 assists, and was named Ohio Ms. Soccer, the Gatorade Ohio Player of the Year, and the United Soccer Coaches national player of the year. She set a state record with 93 career assists and a school record with 113 career goals.

== College career ==
=== Tennessee Volunteers ===
Huff played in all 23 games (22 starts) for the Tennessee Volunteers in her freshman season in 2021, leading the Volunteers to win the Southeastern Conference East title and the SEC tournament, beating Arkansas in the final. She finished the season with 10 goals and 5 assists and was named the SEC Freshman of the Year and second-team All-SEC. In the NCAA tournament, she scored two goals with one assist as Tennessee reached the third round. She trained with the NWSL's Washington Spirit the following summer.

In her sophomore season in 2022, Huff scored 5 goals and led the Volunteers with 7 assists in 18 games, being named first-team All-SEC and third-team All-American. The Volunteers were SEC East co-champions but lost in their opening matches in the SEC and NCAA tournaments.

=== Florida State Seminoles ===
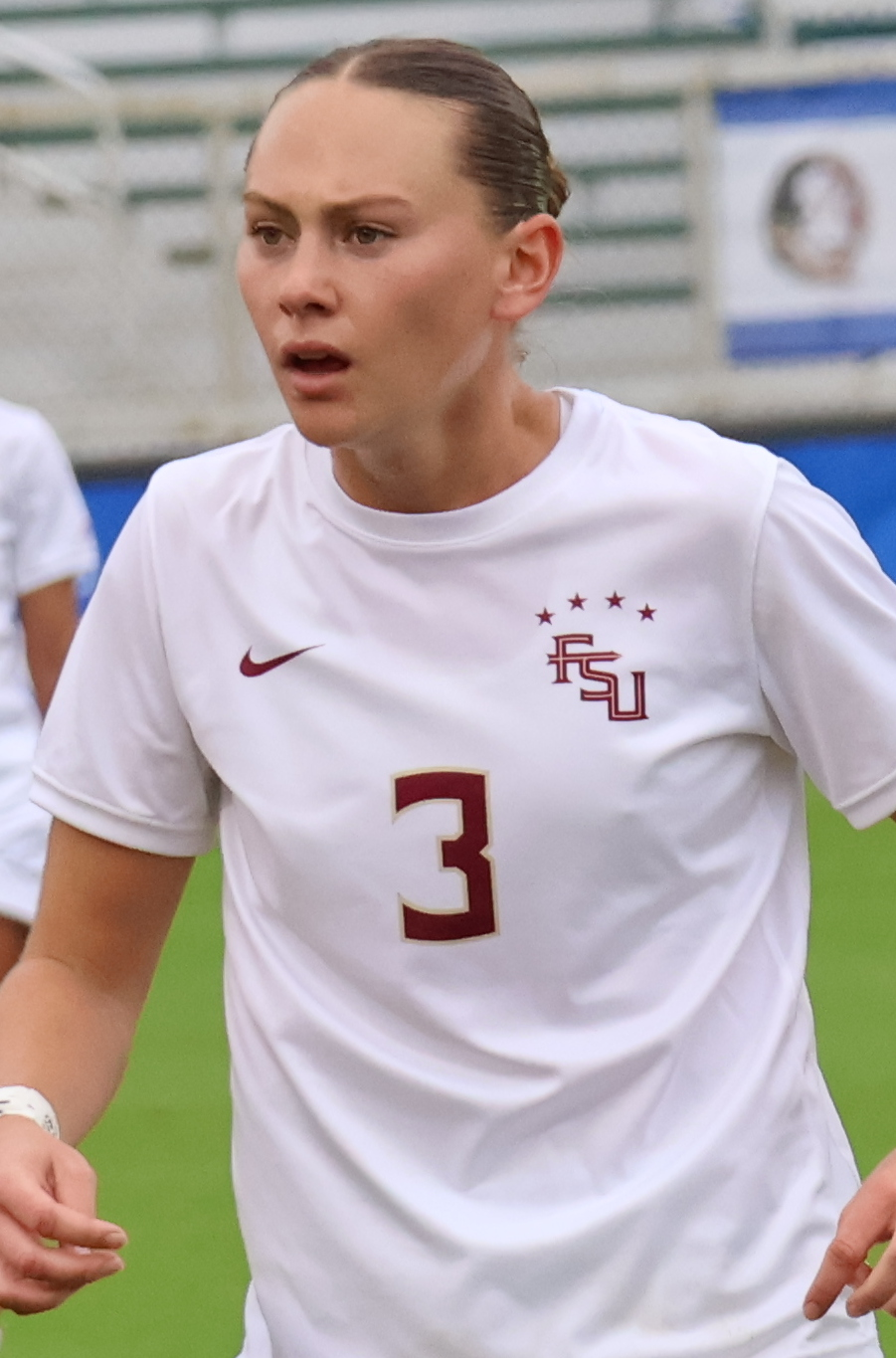
Huff with Florida State in the 2024 ACC Championship Game

Huff transferred to the Florida State Seminoles for her junior season in 2023, reuniting with head coach Brian Pensky, who had recruited her to Tennessee and coached her there for one season. She scored 7 goals and led her new team with 14 assists (fourth in the country) in 17 games, earning second-team All-ACC and second-team All-American honors. She had two goals and two assists in the NCAA tournament as Florida State finished the season as undefeated national champions.

In her senior season in 2024, Huff scored a team-high 12 goals and added 10 assists in 21 games. She scored in both the semifinals and final of the ACC tournament, being named tournament MVP as Florida State won their fifth conference tournament in a row. In the NCAA tournament, she made her penalty kick in a shootout loss to Vanderbilt in the second round. She was named first-team All-ACC and first-team All-American at the end of the season.

== Club career ==
=== Bay FC ===
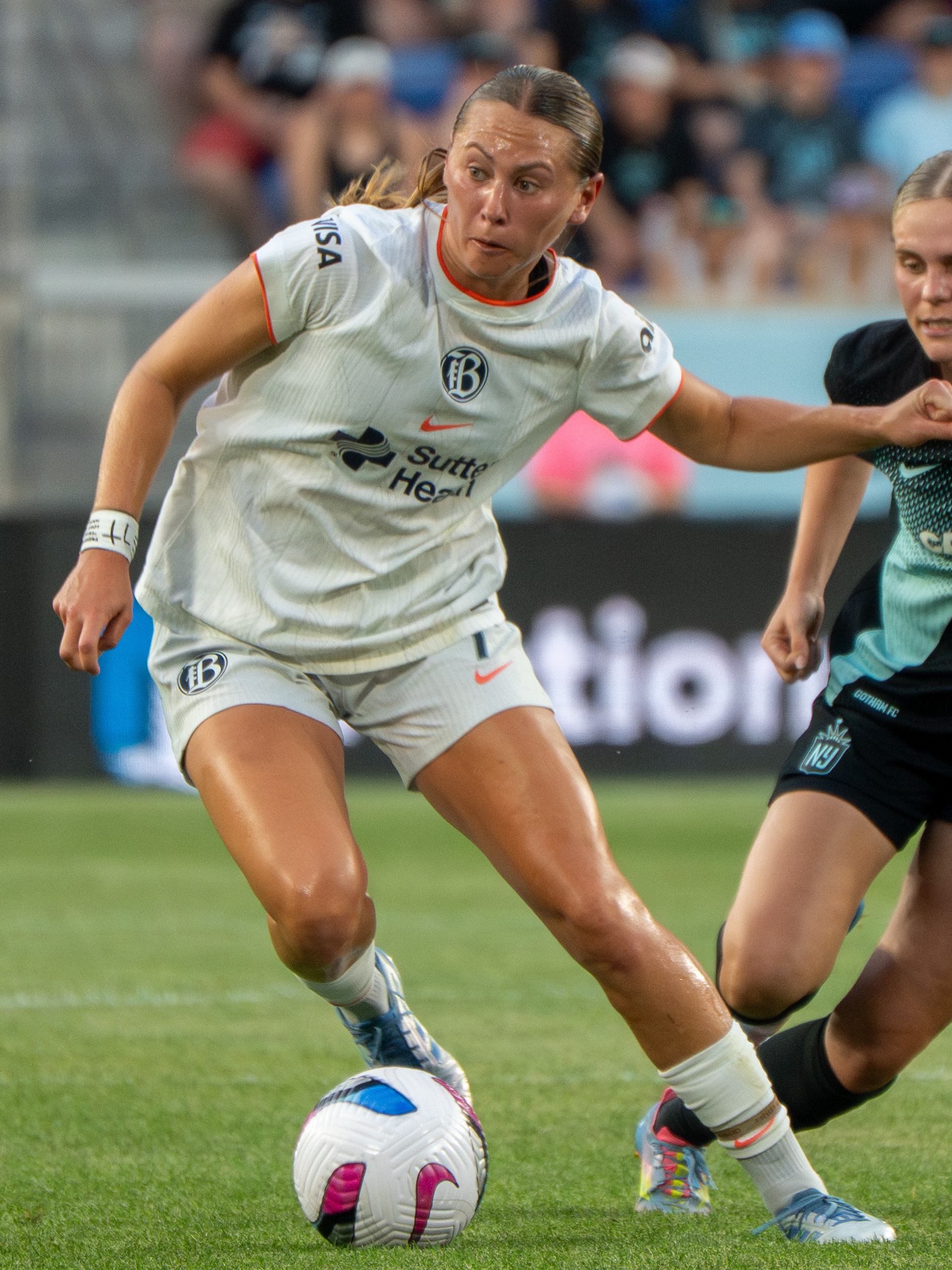
Huff with Bay FC in 2025

Bay FC announced on January 9, 2025, that the club had signed Huff to her first professional contract, a three-year deal with a club option for an additional year. Huff made her professional debut on March 15, starting and playing 90 minutes in a season-opening 1–1 draw with the Utah Royals. On August 2, she scored her first professional goal as Bay drew 2–2 with the Houston Dash. She was named NWSL Rookie of the Month for October/November after scoring twice in four games. She finished her rookie season with 4 goals in 26 games and was one of only two rookies in the NWSL to start every game of the season. She ranked second in minutes played for Bay and was tied for second in goals for the team.

== International career ==
Huff was invited to training camps with the United States under-16 team in 2018 and the under-20 team in 2022. She played internationally for the under-23 team in 2023. She was called up by Emma Hayes into Futures Camp, practicing alongside the senior national team, in January 2025.

== Honors and awards ==
Tennessee Volunteers

- SEC women's soccer tournament: 2021

Florida State Seminoles

- NCAA Division I women's soccer tournament: 2023
- ACC women's soccer tournament: 2023, 2024
- Atlantic Coast Conference: 2023

Individual

- NWSL Rookie of the Month: October/November 2025
- First-team All-American: 2024
- Second-team All-American: 2023
- Third-team All-American: 2022
- First-team All-ACC: 2024
- Second-team All-ACC: 2023
- First-team All-SEC: 2022
- Second-team All-SEC: 2021
- SEC Freshman of the Year: 2021
- NCAA tournament all-tournament team: 2023
- ACC tournament MVP: 2024
