= 2024 ACC women's soccer tournament =

Soccer tournament

- Classification: Division I
- Teams: 6
- Matches: 5
- Attendance: 6,925
- Quarterfinals site: Campus Sites
- Semifinals site: WakeMed Soccer Park; Cary, North Carolina
- Finals site: WakeMed Soccer Park; Cary, North Carolina
- Champions: Florida State (11 title)
- Winning coach: Brian Pensky (3 title)
- MVP: Taylor Huff (Florida State)
- Broadcast: ACCN (Quarterfinals & Semifinals), ESPNU (Final)

2024 ACC women's soccer standings
| | Conf. | | | | | | Overall |
| Team | W | | L | | T | PCT | W | | L | | T | PCT |
|---|---|---|---|---|---|---|---|---|---|---|---|---|
| No. 3 Duke ‍†‍‍^{y} | 9 | – | 0 | – | 1 | .950 | 18 | – | 3 | – | 1 | .841 |
| No. 2 Wake Forest ‍‍‍^{y} | 7 | – | 2 | – | 1 | .750 | 16 | – | 4 | – | 4 | .750 |
| No. 13 Florida State ‍‍‡‍^{y} | 7 | – | 2 | – | 1 | .750 | 15 | – | 2 | – | 4 | .810 |
| No. 1 North Carolina ‍‍‍^{y} | 7 | – | 3 | – | 0 | .700 | 22 | – | 5 | – | 0 | .815 |
| No. 7 Virginia Tech ‍‍‍^{y} | 6 | – | 2 | – | 2 | .700 | 14 | – | 6 | – | 3 | .674 |
| No. 6 Notre Dame ‍‍‍^{y} | 5 | – | 1 | – | 4 | .700 | 14 | – | 4 | – | 4 | .727 |
| California ‍‍‍^{y} | 5 | – | 4 | – | 1 | .550 | 13 | – | 6 | – | 2 | .667 |
| No. 4 Stanford ‍‍‍^{y} | 5 | – | 4 | – | 1 | .550 | 16 | – | 5 | – | 2 | .739 |
| Virginia ‍‍‍^{y} | 5 | – | 5 | – | 0 | .500 | 13 | – | 5 | – | 1 | .711 |
| Boston College ‍‍‍ | 4 | – | 4 | – | 2 | .500 | 12 | – | 5 | – | 2 | .684 |
| Pittsburgh ‍‍‍ | 3 | – | 5 | – | 2 | .400 | 9 | – | 6 | – | 3 | .583 |
| Louisville ‍‍‍ | 2 | – | 5 | – | 3 | .350 | 7 | – | 6 | – | 5 | .528 |
| SMU ‍‍‍ | 2 | – | 6 | – | 2 | .300 | 6 | – | 9 | – | 2 | .412 |
| Clemson ‍‍‍ | 2 | – | 7 | – | 1 | .250 | 6 | – | 8 | – | 3 | .441 |
| Miami (FL) ‍‍‍ | 1 | – | 6 | – | 3 | .250 | 5 | – | 8 | – | 4 | .412 |
| NC State ‍‍‍ | 1 | – | 6 | – | 3 | .250 | 4 | – | 10 | – | 4 | .333 |
| Syracuse ‍‍‍ | 0 | – | 9 | – | 1 | .050 | 6 | – | 10 | – | 2 | .389 |
† – Conference champion ‡ – 2024 ACC Tournament champion y – Invited to the NCAA Tournament; As of December 10, 2024; Rankings from United Soccer Coaches Poll; Source: The ACC

The 2024 Atlantic Coast Conference women's soccer tournament was the post season women's soccer tournament for the Atlantic Coast Conference, held from November 3 through November 10, 2024. The five-match tournament took place at campus sites for the quarterfinals and WakeMed Soccer Park in Cary, North Carolina for the semifinals and final. The higher seed hosted the campus site matches. The six-team single-elimination tournament consisted of three rounds based on seeding from regular season conference play. The Florida State Seminoles were the four-time defending champions. They successfully defended their crown, defeating North Carolina in the Final 3–2. This was Florida State's eleventh overall title, and fifth title in a row. It was head coach Brian Pensky's third consecutive title. As tournament champions, Florida State earned the ACC's automatic berth into the 2024 NCAA Division I women's soccer tournament.

== Qualification ==
The top six teams in the Atlantic Coast Conference earned a berth into the ACC Tournament. The top two teams earned a bye to the semifinals. The final seedings was determined after the final day of the regular season on October 31, 2024. A tiebreaker was required to determine the second and third seeds and determine which team received a first round bye as Florida State and Wake Forest both tied with 7–2–1 regular season records. Wake Forest earned the second seed and the bye, by virtue of their 4–1 victory over Florida State on October 3.

| Seed | School | Conference Record | Points |
|---|---|---|---|
| 1 | Duke | 9–0–1 | 28 |
| 2 | Wake Forest | 7–2–1 | 22 |
| 3 | Florida State | 7–2–1 | 22 |
| 4 | North Carolina | 7–3–0 | 21 |
| 5 | Virginia Tech | 6–2–2 | 20 |
| 6 | Notre Dame | 5–1–4 | 19 |

== Bracket ==
First Round; November 3 ACCN
4 | North Carolina | 2
5 | Virginia Tech | 0
3 | Florida State | 2
6 | Notre Dame | 1

Semifinal; November 7 ACCN
1 | Duke | 1
4 | North Carolina | 2
2 | Wake Forest | 1 (1)
3 | Florida State (pen.) | 1 (3)

Championship; November 10; ESPNU
4 | North Carolina | 2
3 | Florida State | 3

== Schedule ==
=== First round ===
| November 3, 2024 | #4 North Carolina | 2–0 | #5 Virginia Tech | Chapel Hill, NC |
| 6:00 p.m. EST | Maddie Dahlien (yellow card) 66'; Kate Faasse 67' (pen.), 68' | Box Score | (yellow card) 46' Emma Pelkowski; (yellow card) 68' Kylie Marschall; (yellow card) 87' Allie George | Stadium: Dorrance Field; Attendance: 1,347; Referee: Corey Rockwell; Assistant referees: Chris Zuerner; Aaron Riley; Fourth official: Brandon Mario |

| November 3, 2024 | #3 Florida State | 2–1 | #6 Notre Dame | Tallahassee, FL |
| 8:00 p.m. EST | Marianyela Jiménez 2'; Heather Gilchrist (yellow card) 39'; Addie Todd (yellow card) 62'; Sophia Nguyen 77'; Carissa Boeckmann (yellow card) 82'; Ran Iwai (yellow card) 83' | Box Score | (yellow card) 46' Team; 82' Izzy Engle | Stadium: Seminole Soccer Complex; Attendance: 1,166; Referee: Meghan Mullen; Assistant referees: Casie Anderson; Patrick Hunter; Fourth official: Mina Pinzon |

=== Semifinals ===
| November 7, 2024 | #2 Wake Forest | 1–1 (a.e.t.) (1–3 p) | #3 Florida State | Cary, North Carolina |
| 5:30 p.m. EST | Dempsey Brown (yellow card) 54'; Emily Morris 83'; Laurel Ansbrow (yellow card) 107' | Box Score | 53' Taylor Huff; (yellow card) 88' Jordynn Dudley; (yellow card) 107' Solai Washington | Stadium: WakeMed Soccer Park; Attendance: 1,065; Referee: Nicole Green; Assistant referees: Kayla Polonsky; Erin Patterson; Fourth official: Jasmine Peralta |
| | Penalties |
| | Dempsey Brown (penalty missed); Emily Morris (penalty scored); Emily Colton (penalty missed); Emily Murphy (penalty missed) | | (penalty missed) Taylor Huff; (penalty scored) Heather Gilchrist; (penalty scored) Ran Iwai; (penalty scored) Solai Washington |

| November 7, 2024 | #1 Duke | 1–2 | #4 North Carolina | Cary, North Carolina |
| 8:00 p.m. EST | Cameron Roller 29' (pen.); Mia Minestrella (yellow card) 34'; Ella Hase (yellow card) 51'; Hannah Bebar (yellow card) 51' | Box Score | 50' Linda Ullmark; (yellow card) 52' Bella Gaetino; (yellow card) 58', (goal) 81' Trinity Armstrong | Stadium: WakeMed Soccer Park; Attendance: 1,492; Referee: Katherine McCormick; Assistant referees: Krystin Pahia; Tiffini Turpin; Fourth official: Jasmine Peralta |

=== Final ===
| November 10, 2024 | #3 North Carolina | 2–3 | #4 Florida State | Cary, North Carolina |
| 12:00 p.m. EST | Kate Faasse 31' (pen.), 43'; Tessa Dellarose (yellow card) 89' | Box Score | 34' Taylor Suarez; (yellow card) 38' Ashlyn Puerta; (yellow card) 55' Solai Washington; 63' (pen.) Taylor Huff; 67' Wrianna Hudson | Stadium: WakeMed Soccer Park; Attendance: 2,905; Referee: Ashley Cedro; Assistant referees: Katie Mitchell; Audra Fullen; Fourth official: Katherine McCormick |

== Statistics ==
=== Goalscorers ===
There were 15 goals scored in 5 matches, for an average of 3 goals per match (as of November 10, 2024).

4 goals

- (United States) Kate Faasse – North Carolina

2 goals

- (United States) Taylor Huff – Florida State

1 goal

- (United States) Trinity Armstrong – North Carolina
- (United States) Izzy Engle – Notre Dame
- (United States) Wrianna Hudson – Florida State
- (Venezuela) Marianyela Jiménez – Florida State
- (United States) Emily Morris – Wake Forest
- (United States) Sophia Nguyen – Florida State
- (United States) Cameron Roller – Duke
- (United States) Taylor Suarez – Florida State
- (United States) Linda Ullmark – North Carolina

== All-Tournament team ==
| Player | Team |
|---|---|
| **Taylor Huff** | Florida State |
| Addie Todd | Florida State |
| Solai Washington | Florida State |
| Jordynn Dudley | Florida State |
| Heather Gilchrist | Florida State |
| Kate Faasse | North Carolina |
| Trinity Armstrong | North Carolina |
| Maddie Dahlien | North Carolina |
| Linda Ullmark | North Carolina |
| Cameron Roller | Duke |
| Emily Morris | Wake Forest |

MVP in bold
