= 2025 Seattle Reign FC season =

Seattle Reign FC
2025 season
- Owner: The Carlyle Group (majority); Seattle Sounders FC
- Governor: Adrian Hanauer
- Head coach: Laura Harvey
- Stadium: Lumen Field
- NWSL: 5th of 14
- Playoffs: Quarterfinals
- Top goalscorer: League: Emeri Adames; Jess Fishlock (6); All: Emeri Adames; Jess Fishlock (6)
- Highest home attendance: 10,117
- Lowest home attendance: 5,912
- Average home league attendance: 7,870
| Home colors | Away colors |
- All statistics correct as of November 2, 2025.

The 2025 season was the thirteenth for Seattle Reign FC, a professional women's soccer team based in Seattle, Washington, United States. It was their thirteenth season in the National Women's Soccer League (NWSL), the top division of women's soccer in the United States.

The Reign spent eight weeks away from their home stadium, Lumen Field, due to the 2025 FIFA Club World Cup and a league-wide break in the regular season. The team returned to Lumen Field in July for a friendly against the Urawa Red Diamonds.

== Team ==
=== Coaching staff ===
As of February 21, 2025.

| Position | Name |
|---|---|
| Head coach | Laura Harvey |
| Head assistant coach | Scott Parkinson |
| Assistant coach | Kate Norton |
| Assistant coach | Lee Nguyen |
| Assistant coach and head of goalkeeping | Lloyd Yaxley |

=== Roster ===
As of October 9, 2025.

| No. | Nat. | Name | Date of birth (age) | Since | Previous team | Notes (Note: denotes a season-ending injury.) |
Goalkeepers
| 1 | United States | Claudia Dickey | January 6, 2000 (aged 25) | 2022 | (United States) North Carolina Tar Heels | |
| 35 | United States | Neeku Purcell | October 7, 2003 (aged 21) | 2025 | (United States) Brooklyn FC | STC |
| 38 | United States | Cassie Miller | April 28, 1995 (aged 29) | 2025 | (United States) Gotham FC | D45 |
| 99 | United States | Maddie Prohaska | December 2, 2002 (aged 22) | 2025 | (United States) Auburn Tigers | |
Defenders
| 3 | United States | Lauren Barnes (captain) | May 31, 1989 (aged 35) | 2013 | (United States) Philadelphia Independence | |
| 11 | United States | Sofia Huerta | December 14, 1992 (aged 32) | 2020 | (Australia) Sydney FC | |
| 13 | United States | Julia Lester | January 16, 1998 (aged 27) | 2024 | (United States) Racing Louisville | LOA |
| 14 | United States | Emily Mason | October 23, 2002 (aged 22) | 2025 | (United States) Rutgers Scarlet Knights | |
| 21 | United States | Phoebe McClernon | December 13, 1997 (aged 27) | 2022 | (United States) Orlando Pride | |
| 22 | United States | Ryanne Brown | January 21, 1999 (aged 26) | 2022 | (United States) Wake Forest Demon Deacons | |
| 23 | United States | Jordyn Bugg | August 11, 2006 (aged 18) | 2024 | (United States) San Diego Surf SC | |
| 24 | United States | Madison Curry | January 23, 2001 (aged 24) | 2025 | (United States) Angel City FC | |
| 25 | United States | Shae Holmes | March 8, 2000 (aged 25) | 2023 | (United States) Washington Huskies | |
| 31 | Sweden | Hanna Glas | April 16, 1993 (aged 31) | 2024 | (United States) Kansas City Current | |
Midfielders
| 2 | United States | Maddie Mercado | April 1, 2001 (aged 23) | 2024 | (United States) Notre Dame Fighting Irish | |
| 8 | Wales | Angharad James-Turner | June 1, 1994 (aged 30) | 2024 | (England) Tottenham Hotspur | INT |
| 10 | Wales | Jess Fishlock | January 14, 1987 (aged 38) | 2013 | (England) Bristol Academy | |
| 16 | United States | Ainsley McCammon | August 16, 2007 (aged 17) | 2024 | (United States) Solar SC | U18 |
| 18 | United States | Sally Menti | March 10, 2002 (aged 23) | 2025 | (United States) Santa Clara Broncos | |
| 20 | United States | Sam Meza | November 7, 2001 (aged 23) | 2024 | (United States) North Carolina Tar Heels | |
| 28 | United States | Mikayla Cluff | February 25, 1999 (aged 26) | 2025 | (United States) Utah Royals | |
| 33 | United States | Olivia Van der Jagt | July 21, 1999 (aged 25) | 2022 | (United States) Washington Huskies | |
| 91 | South Korea | Ji So-yun | February 21, 1991 (aged 34) | 2024 | (South Korea) Suwon FC | LOA, INT |
Forwards
| 5 | United States | Maddie Dahlien | July 25, 2004 (aged 20) | 2025 | (United States) North Carolina Tar Heels | |
| 6 | United States | Lynn Biyendolo | May 21, 1993 (aged 31) | 2025 | (United States) Gotham FC | |
| 7 | Switzerland | Ana-Maria Crnogorčević | October 3, 1990 (aged 34) | 2024 | (Spain) Atlético Madrid | INT |
| 9 | Canada | Jordyn Huitema | May 8, 2001 (aged 23) | 2022 | (France) Paris Saint-Germain | INT |
| 12 | United States | Veronica Latsko | December 12, 1995 (aged 29) | 2022 | (United States) Houston Dash | |
| 19 | United States | Mia Fishel | April 30, 2001 (aged 23) | 2025 | (England) Chelsea | |
| 30 | Haiti | Nérilia Mondésir | January 17, 1999 (aged 26) | 2024 | (France) Montpellier HSC | INT |
| 47 | United States | Emeri Adames | April 3, 2006 (aged 18) | 2024 | (United States) Solar SC | |

== Non-competitive ==
=== Preseason ===
| February 8 | Seattle Reign FC | 3–1 | Spokane Zephyr FC | Renton, Washington |
| | Meza; Biyendolo; Dahlien | Report | Goal | Stadium: Providence Swedish Performance Center & Clubhouse |
Note: Closed-door scrimmage

| March 8 | Washington Huskies | 0–2 | Seattle Reign FC | Seattle |
| 6:00 pm PST | | Report | Curry (yellow card) 54'; Huitema 60'; Van der Jagt 76' | Stadium: Husky Soccer Stadium; Attendance: 2,374 |

==== Coachella Valley Invitational ====
| February 16 | Bay FC | 0–1 | Seattle Reign FC | Indio, California |
| 1:00 pm PST | | Report | Biyendolo 9' | Stadium: Empire Polo Club |

| February 22 | Angel City FC | 1–1 | Seattle Reign FC | Indio, California |
| 12:00 pm PST | Phair 86' | Report | Dahlien 25' | Stadium: Empire Polo Club |

=== Friendlies ===
| July 20 | Seattle Reign FC (United States) | 2–1 | (Japan) Urawa Red Diamonds | Seattle, Washington |
| 1:00 pm PDT | Huerta 27', 53' (pen.) | Box; Report | Takatsuka 36' | Stadium: Lumen Field; Attendance: 6,495 |

| July 26 | Portland Thorns FC | 0–0 (4–5 p) | Seattle Reign FC | Portland, Oregon |
| 7:00 pm PDT | Coffey (yellow card) 39'; Daiane (yellow card) 84' | Report | Meza (yellow card) 13' | Stadium: Providence Park |

== Competitions ==
Win Draw Loss

=== Regular season ===
The NWSL announced the 2025 regular season schedule on January 22, 2025.

| March 15 1 | Seattle Reign FC | 1–1 | Gotham FC | Seattle, Washington |
| 7:00 pm PDT | Huitema (yellow card) 42'; Bugg (yellow card) 52'; Adames 71' | Box; Report | Portilho (yellow card) 38' (goal) 47'; Schupansky (yellow card) 66'; Howell (yellow card) 74'; Freeman (red card) 87' | Stadium: Lumen Field; Attendance: 8,467; Referee: Alexandra Billeter |

| March 22 2 | North Carolina Courage | 1–2 | Seattle Reign FC | Cary, North Carolina |
| 4:00 pm PDT | Gomes 59' | Box; Report | Fishlock 35'; Bugg 56' | Stadium: First Horizon Stadium at WakeMed Soccer Park; Attendance: 8,158; Referee: Elvis Osmanovic |

| March 30 3 | Angel City FC | 2–1 | Seattle Reign FC | Los Angeles, California |
| 5:00 pm PDT | A. Thompson 8' (yellow card) 89'; Tiernan 63' | Box; Report | Ji 12' (pen.); Mondésir (yellow card) 63'; Dahlien (yellow card) 90+2' | Stadium: BMO Stadium; Attendance: 15,384; Referee: Gerald Flores |

| April 12 4 | Seattle Reign FC | 0–1 | Orlando Pride | Seattle, Washington |
| 4:30 pm PDT | | Box; Report | Banda 41' | Stadium: Lumen Field; Attendance: 7,721; Referee: Greg Dopka |

| April 18 5 | Seattle Reign FC | 1–0 | Portland Thorns FC | Seattle, Washington |
| 7:00 pm PDT | Dahlien 4' | Box; Report | Reyes (yellow card) 17'; Torpey (yellow card) 45+1'; Perry (yellow card) 77' | Stadium: Lumen Field; Attendance: 7,609; Referee: Jeremy Scheer |

| April 26 6 | Bay FC | 1–1 | Seattle Reign FC | San Jose, California |
| 7:00 pm PDT | Kundananji 32'; Dydasco (yellow card) 44' | Box; Report | Dahlien (yellow card) 19'; Huitema 50' | Stadium: PayPal Park; Attendance: 11,564; Referee: Ekaterina Koroleva |

| May 2 7 | Seattle Reign FC | 1–0 | Kansas City Current | Seattle, Washington |
| 7:30 pm PDT | Biyendolo 37'; Barnes (yellow card) 57'; Ji (yellow card) 70' | Box; Report | LaBonta (yellow card) 69' | Stadium: Lumen Field; Attendance: 5,912; Referee: Calin Radosav |

| May 11 8 | Seattle Reign FC | 0–1 | Houston Dash | Seattle, Washington |
| 5:00 pm PDT | Dahlien (yellow card) 16' | Box; Report | Graham 57' | Stadium: Lumen Field; Attendance: 6,841; Referee: Alyssa Nichols |

| May 17 9 | Racing Louisville FC | 0–1 | Seattle Reign FC | Louisville, Kentucky |
| 10:00 am PDT | | Box; Report | Dahlien 39'; Mason (yellow card) 90'; Bugg (yellow card) 90+6' | Stadium: Lynn Family Stadium; Attendance: 3,039; Referee: Iryna Petrunok |
Note: This game was originally scheduled to be played on May 16.

| May 23 10 | Seattle Reign FC | 1–2 | Washington Spirit | Seattle, Washington |
| 7:00 pm PDT | Holmes 17' (yellow card) 55' | Box; Report | Bethune 11'; Hatch 35'; Miura (yellow card) 50' | Stadium: Lumen Field; Attendance: 7,080; Referee: Brad Jensen |

| June 6 11 | San Diego Wave FC | 1–2 | Seattle Reign FC | San Diego, California |
| 7:00 pm PDT | Cascarino 75' | Box; Report | Barnes (yellow card) 14'; Menti (yellow card) 53' (goal) 67'; Adames 87' | Stadium: Snapdragon Stadium; Attendance: 15,393; Referee: Gerald Flores |

| June 14 12 | Chicago Stars FC | 2–2 | Seattle Reign FC | Chicago, Illinois |
| 2:00 pm PDT | Ludmila 11', 13' | Box; Report | Curry (yellow card) 67'; Biyendolo 87'; Bugg 89' | Stadium: Soldier Field; Attendance: 26,942; Referee: Shawn Tehini |

| June 21 13 | Utah Royals | 1–4 | Seattle Reign FC | Sandy, Utah |
| 2:00 pm PDT | St-Georges 31'; Monaghan (yellow card) 45+2'; Tanaka (yellow card) 85'; McGlynn (yellow card) 90+7' | Box; Report | Ji 6'; Dahlien 16'; Curry (yellow card) 38'; McClernon (yellow card) 49'; Adames 66', 90+1' (pen.) | Stadium: America First Field; Attendance: 8,192; Referee: Thomas Snyder |

| August 1 14 | Seattle Reign FC | 2–0 | Angel City FC | Seattle, Washington |
| 7:30 pm PDT | Fishlock 66'; Kennedy 86' (o.g.) | Box; Report | | Stadium: Lumen Field; Attendance: 10,117; Referee: Shawn Tehini |

| August 10 15 | Portland Thorns FC | 4–2 | Seattle Reign FC | Portland, Oregon |
| 1:00 pm PDT | Coffey 18' (pen.); Turner 26'; Reyes 55'; Tordin 65' | Box; Report | Adames 3'; Fishlock 64' | Stadium: Providence Park; Attendance: 21,811; Referee: Katja Koroleva |

| August 18 16 | Seattle Reign FC | 3–3 | Chicago Stars FC | Seattle, Washington |
| 7:00 pm PDT | Fishlock 3'; Huitema 34'; Adames 46'; Meza (yellow card) 88' | Box; Report | Staab (yellow card) 56'; Ludmila 73'; Biegalski 78'; Naeher 90+9' | Stadium: Lumen Field; Attendance: 7,290; Referee: Greg Dopka |

| August 24 17 | Houston Dash | 1–1 | Seattle Reign FC | Houston, Texas |
| 4:00 pm PDT | Ryan 47' | Box; Report | Huitema 65'; Menti (yellow card) 68'; Mason (yellow card) 90' | Stadium: Shell Energy Stadium; Attendance: 5,481; Referee: Iryna Petrunok |

| August 29 18 | Seattle Reign FC | 0–0 | San Diego Wave FC | Seattle, Washington |
| 7:30 pm PDT | Menti (yellow card) 37' | Box; Report | McNabb (yellow card) 60' | Stadium: Lumen Field; Attendance: 9,974; Referee: Calin Radosav |

| September 7 19 | Washington Spirit | 2–0 | Seattle Reign FC | Washington, D.C. |
| 1:00 pm PDT | Rodman 33', 81'; Bethune (yellow card) 90+1' | Box; Report | | Stadium: Audi Field; Attendance: 12,668; Referee: John Griggs |

| September 14 20 | Seattle Reign FC | 1–0 | Racing Louisville FC | Seattle, Washington |
| 5:00 pm PDT | Meza (yellow card) 64'; Fishlock 90'; Bugg (yellow card) 90+7' | Box; Report | Jean (yellow card) 31'; Flint (yellow card) 90+2' | Stadium: Lumen Field; Attendance: 8,091; Referee: Jaclyn Metz |
Note: Suspended at halftime due to a player incident and completed on September 16 behind closed doors.

| September 20 21 | Kansas City Current | 2–0 | Seattle Reign FC | Kansas City, Missouri |
| | Debinha 34' (pen.); Chawinga 74'; Ball (yellow card) 90+5'; Hutton (yellow card) 90+10' | Box; Report | James-Turner (yellow card) 29'; Mondésir (yellow card) 45'; Huitema (yellow card) 88' | Stadium: CPKC Stadium; Attendance: 11,500; Referee: Shawn Tehini |

| September 28 22 | Seattle Reign FC | 2–1 | North Carolina Courage | Seattle |
| | Menti (yellow card) 20'; Williams 71' (o.g.); Dahlien 80'; Barnes (yellow card) 90+9' | Box; Report | Betfort 57' | Stadium: Lumen Field; Attendance: 8,563; Referee: Elijio Arreguin |

| October 5 23 | Gotham FC | 0–0 | Seattle Reign FC | Harrison, New Jersey |
| | Purce (yellow card) 70' | Box; Report | Bugg (yellow card) 13'; Mondésir (yellow card) 58' | Stadium: Sports Illustrated Stadium; Attendance: 9,752; Referee: Elvis Osmanovic |

| October 10 24 | Seattle Reign FC | 1–1 | Bay FC | Seattle |
| | McClernon (yellow card) 58'; Fishlock 84' | Box; Report | Huff 31'; Conti (yellow card) 90+8' | Stadium: Lumen Field; Attendance: 6,715; Referee: Matthew Thompson |

| October 17 25 | Seattle Reign FC | 2–1 | Utah Royals | Seattle |
| | McCammon 45+2'; Huerta 67' (pen.) | Box; Report | Lacasse (yellow card) 13'; Monaghan 61'; Del Fava (yellow card) 77' | Stadium: Lumen Field; Attendance: 7,930; Referee: Cristian Campo |

| November 2 26 | Orlando Pride | 1–1 | Seattle Reign FC | Orlando, Florida |
| | Pickett 76'; Yates (yellow card) 85' | Box; Report | Huerta (yellow card) 35'; Mercado (yellow card) 59'; Mondésir (yellow card) 70'; Bugg 79' | Stadium: Inter&Co Stadium; Attendance: 8,689; Referee: Brad Jensen |

==== Regular-season standings ====
| Pos | Team | Pld | W | D | L | GF | GA | GD | Pts | Qualification |
|---|---|---|---|---|---|---|---|---|---|---|
| 3 | Portland Thorns FC | 26 | 11 | 7 | 8 | 36 | 29 | +7 | 40 | Playoffs |
| 4 | Orlando Pride | 26 | 11 | 7 | 8 | 33 | 27 | +6 | 40 | Playoffs |
| 5 | Seattle Reign FC | 26 | 10 | 9 | 7 | 32 | 29 | +3 | 39 | Playoffs |
| 6 | San Diego Wave FC | 26 | 10 | 7 | 9 | 41 | 34 | +7 | 37 | Playoffs |
| 7 | Racing Louisville FC | 26 | 10 | 7 | 9 | 35 | 38 | −3 | 37 | Playoffs |

Source: NWSL
Rules for classification: 1) points; 2) total goal difference; 3) total wins; 4) total goals scored; 5) head-to-head points; 6) head-to-head goals scored; 7) fewest disciplinary points; 8) coin toss (if 2 clubs tied) or drawing of lots (if ≥3 clubs tied).

==== Results summary ====
| Overall | | | | | | | | Home | | | | | | Away | | | | | |
| Pld | W | D | L | GF | GA | GD | Pts | W | D | L | GF | GA | GD | W | D | L | GF | GA | GD |
|---|---|---|---|---|---|---|---|---|---|---|---|---|---|---|---|---|---|---|---|
| 26 | 10 | 9 | 7 | 32 | 29 | +3 | 39 | 6 | 4 | 3 | 15 | 11 | +4 | 4 | 5 | 4 | 17 | 18 | −1 |

Last updated: November 2, 2025.
Source: NWSLsoccer.com

=== Playoffs ===
The Reign clinched a playoffs spot after a home win against Utah Royals in the penultimate match of the regular season on October 17.

==== Bracket ====
Quarterfinals
1 | Kansas City Current | 1
8 | Gotham FC (a.e.t.) | 2
4 | Orlando Pride | 2
5 | Seattle Reign FC | 0
2 | Washington Spirit (p) | 1 (3)
7 | Racing Louisville FC | 1 (1)
3 | Portland Thorns FC (a.e.t.) | 1
6 | San Diego Wave FC | 0

Semifinals
8 | Gotham FC | 1
4 | Orlando Pride | 0
2 | Washington Spirit | 2
3 | Portland Thorns FC | 0

Championship
8 | Gotham FC | 1
2 | Washington Spirit | 0

==== Results ====
| November 7 Quarterfinal | Orlando Pride | 2–0 | Seattle Reign FC | Orlando, Florida |
| | McCutcheon 21'; Rafaelle (yellow card) 57'; Marta (yellow card) 61'; Luana 90+8' (pen.) | Box; Report | | Stadium: Inter&Co Stadium; Attendance: 11,355; Referee: Abdou Ndiaye |

== Appearances and goals ==
As of November 7, 2025; only players who have made appearances are listed.

| No. | Pos | Nat | Player | Total | | Regular season | | Playoffs | |
| No. | Pos | Nat | Player | Apps | Goals | Apps | Goals | Apps | Goals |
|---|---|---|---|---|---|---|---|---|---|
Goalkeepers:
| 1 | GK | (United States) USA | Claudia Dickey | 27 | 0 | 26 | 0 | 1 | 0 |
Defenders:
| 3 | DF | (United States) USA | Lauren Barnes | 21 | 0 | 16+4 | 0 | 1 | 0 |
| 11 | DF | (United States) USA | Sofia Huerta | 14 | 1 | 13 | 1 | 1 | 0 |
| 14 | DF | (United States) USA | Emily Mason | 12 | 0 | 2+10 | 0 | 0 | 0 |
| 21 | DF | (United States) USA | Phoebe McClernon | 26 | 0 | 24+1 | 0 | 1 | 0 |
| 23 | DF | (United States) USA | Jordyn Bugg | 26 | 3 | 24+1 | 3 | 1 | 0 |
| 24 | DF | (United States) USA | Madison Curry | 27 | 0 | 24+2 | 0 | 1 | 0 |
| 25 | DF | (United States) USA | Shae Holmes | 16 | 1 | 8+8 | 1 | 0 | 0 |
| 31 | DF | (Sweden) SWE | Hanna Glas | 1 | 0 | 0+1 | 0 | 0 | 0 |
Midfielders:
| 2 | MF | (United States) USA | Maddie Mercado | 15 | 0 | 6+8 | 0 | 1 | 0 |
| 8 | MF | (Wales) WAL | Angharad James-Turner | 14 | 0 | 11+3 | 0 | 0 | 0 |
| 10 | MF | (Wales) WAL | Jess Fishlock | 18 | 6 | 8+9 | 6 | 0+1 | 0 |
| 16 | MF | (United States) USA | Ainsley McCammon | 17 | 1 | 7+9 | 1 | 1 | 0 |
| 18 | MF | (United States) USA | Sally Menti | 16 | 1 | 10+5 | 1 | 0+1 | 0 |
| 20 | MF | (United States) USA | Sam Meza | 27 | 0 | 21+5 | 0 | 1 | 0 |
| 33 | MF | (United States) USA | Olivia Van der Jagt | 3 | 0 | 0+3 | 0 | 0 | 0 |
Forwards:
| 5 | FW | (United States) USA | Maddie Dahlien | 27 | 4 | 21+5 | 4 | 0+1 | 0 |
| 6 | FW | (United States) USA | Lynn Biyendolo | 13 | 2 | 7+6 | 2 | 0 | 0 |
| 7 | FW | (Switzerland) SUI | Ana-Maria Crnogorčević | 12 | 0 | 5+7 | 0 | 0 | 0 |
| 9 | FW | (Canada) CAN | Jordyn Huitema | 23 | 3 | 18+4 | 3 | 1 | 0 |
| 19 | FW | (United States) USA | Mia Fishel | 12 | 0 | 4+7 | 0 | 0+1 | 0 |
| 30 | FW | (Haiti) HAI | Nérilia Mondésir | 21 | 0 | 11+9 | 0 | 1 | 0 |
| 47 | FW | (United States) USA | Emeri Adames | 22 | 6 | 11+10 | 6 | 0+1 | 0 |
Players who left the team during the season:
| 91 | MF | (South Korea) KOR | Ji So-yun | 13 | 2 | 9+4 | 2 | 0 | 0 |
Own goals for:
| | DF | (Australia) AUS | Alanna Kennedy (8/1 v. LA) | 1 | 1 | 1 | 1 | 0 | 0 |
| | DF | (United States) USA | Ryan Williams (9/28 v. NC) | 1 | 1 | 1 | 1 | 0 | 0 |

== Transactions ==
For incoming transfers, dates listed are when Seattle Reign FC officially signed the players to the roster. Transactions where only the rights to the players are acquired are not listed. For outgoing transfers, dates listed are when Seattle Reign FC officially removed the players from its roster, not when they signed with another team. If a player later signed with another team, her new team will be noted, but the date listed here remains the one when she was officially removed from the Seattle Reign FC roster.

=== Transfers in ===
| Date | Player | Pos. | Signed From | Notes | Ref. |
|---|---|---|---|---|---|
| December 4, 2024 | (United States) Madison Curry | DF | (United States) Angel City FC | Free | |
| December 20, 2024 | (United States) Lynn Biyendolo | FW | (United States) Gotham FC | Traded, along with Cassie Miller, in exchange for Jaelin Howell, a 2025 international roster spot, and $70,000 in allocation money | |
| December 20, 2024 | (United States) Cassie Miller | GK | (United States) Gotham FC | Traded, along with Lynn Biyendolo, in exchange for Jaelin Howell, a 2025 international roster spot, and $70,000 in allocation money | |
| January 8, 2025 | (United States) Emily Mason | DF | (United States) Rutgers Scarlet Knights | Free | |
| January 8, 2025 | (United States) Maddie Dahlien | FW | (United States) North Carolina Tar Heels | Free | |
| March 6, 2025 | (United States) Maddie Prohaska | GK | (United States) Auburn Tigers | Free | |
| March 12, 2025 | (Panama) Sofia Cedeno | MF | (United States) Solar SC | Free | |
| March 25, 2025 | (United States) Sally Menti | MF | (United States) Santa Clara Broncos | Free; initially signed to a short-term contract until June 30, 2025 | |
| June 3, 2025 | (United States) Neeku Purcell | GK | (United States) Brooklyn FC | Undisclosed; short-term contract as goalkeeper replacement for Cassie Miller | |
| July 10, 2025 | (United States) Mia Fishel | FW | (England) Chelsea | Undisclosed | |
| September 6, 2025 | (United States) Mikayla Cluff | MF | (United States) Utah Royals | Free | |

=== Transfers out ===
| Date | Player | Pos. | Destination Team | Notes | Ref. |
|---|---|---|---|---|---|
| December 10, 2024 | (United States) McKenzie Weinert | FW | (United States) Spokane Zephyr | Waived | |
| December 10, 2024 | (United States) Olivia Athens | MF | Retirement | | |
| December 10, 2024 | (United States) Laurel Ivory | GK | (United States) Kansas City Current | Free | |
| December 10, 2024 | (United States) Tziarra King | FW | (United States) Brooklyn FC | Free | |
| December 10, 2024 | (United States) Maia Pérez | GK | Retirement | | |
| December 10, 2024 | (Canada) Quinn | MF | (Canada) Vancouver Rise | Free | |
| December 10, 2024 | (United States) Nikki Stanton | MF | (Canada) Vancouver Rise | Free | |
| December 20, 2024 | (United States) Jaelin Howell | MF | (United States) Gotham FC | Traded, along with a 2025 international roster spot and $70,000 in allocation money, in exchange for Lynn Biyendolo and Cassie Miller | |
| March 24, 2025 | (Panama) Sofia Cedeno | MF | (Canada) Halifax Tides | Contract mutually terminated | |
| July 25, 2025 | (Wales) Lily Woodham | DF | (England) Liverpool | Contract mutually terminated | |

=== Loans out ===
| Start | End | Player | Pos. | Destination Team | Notes | Ref. |
|---|---|---|---|---|---|---|
| September 12, 2024 | June 30, 2025 | (United States) Sofia Huerta | DF | (France) Lyon | | |
| September 13, 2024 | June 30, 2025 | (Wales) Lily Woodham | DF | (England) Crystal Palace | Loan extended | |
| March 12, 2025 | March 24, 2025 | (Panama) Sofia Cedeno | MF | (United States) Brooklyn FC | Contract mutually terminated | |
| July 9, 2025 | December 31, 2025 | (United States) Julia Lester | DF | (United States) Sporting JAX | | |
| July 9, 2025 | October 9, 2025 | (United States) Olivia Van der Jagt | MF | (United States) Spokane Zephyr | Recalled | |
| August 20, 2025 | October 8, 2025 | (United States) Maddie Mercado | MF | (United States) Carolina Ascent | Recalled | |
| September 5, 2025 | December 31, 2025 | (South Korea) Ji So-yun | MF | (England) Birmingham City | Undisclosed loan fee | |

=== New contracts ===
| Date | Player | Pos. | Notes | Ref. |
|---|---|---|---|---|
| November 7, 2024 | (Wales) Jess Fishlock | MF | Re-signed | |
| November 20, 2024 | (Sweden) Hanna Glas | DF | Re-signed | |
| January 13, 2025 | (United States) Maddie Mercado | MF | Re-signed | |
| January 14, 2025 | (United States) Lauren Barnes | DF | Re-signed | |
| May 23, 2025 | (United States) Claudia Dickey | GK | Contract extended | |
| June 25, 2025 | (United States) Sally Menti | MF | Contract extended | |
| June 30, 2025 | (United States) Cassie Miller | GK | Option exercised | |
| June 30, 2025 | (United States) Sam Meza | MF | Contract extended | |
| July 31, 2025 | (Wales) Angharad James-Turner | MF | Contract extended | |
| August 7, 2025 | (United States) Maddie Prohaska | GK | Contract extended | |
| August 20, 2025 | (United States) Maddie Mercado | MF | Contract extended | |
| August 27, 2025 | (United States) Emily Mason | DF | Contract extended | |
| September 19, 2025 | (United States) Ryanne Brown | DF | Contract extended | |
| November 24, 2025 | (Wales) Jess Fishlock | MF | Re-signed | |

== Awards ==
=== FIFA Marta Award ===
- (United States) Jordyn Bugg (finalist)

=== NWSL annual awards ===
The NWSL announced awards finalists on November 10.

- NWSL Defender of the Year: (United States) Jordyn Bugg (finalist)
- NWSL Goalkeeper of the Year: (United States) Claudia Dickey (finalist)
- NWSL Rookie of the Year: (United States) Maddie Dahlien (finalist)

The NWSL announced awards winners on November 19.

- NWSL Second XI: (United States) Jordyn Bugg, (United States) Claudia Dickey

=== Best XI of the Month ===
| Month | Player | Ref. |
|---|---|---|
| March | (United States) Jordyn Bugg | |
| May | (United States) Claudia Dickey | |
| June | (United States) Emeri Adames (United States) Jordyn Bugg (2) | |
| August | (Wales) Jess Fishlock (United States) Sofia Huerta | |
| October/November | (United States) Sofia Huerta (2) | |

=== Player of the Week ===
| Week | Player | Ref. |
|---|---|---|
| 16 | (Canada) Jordyn Huitema | |

=== Goal of the Week ===
| Week | Player | Ref. |
|---|---|---|
| 2 | (United States) Jordyn Bugg | |

=== Save of the Week ===
| Week | Player | Ref. |
|---|---|---|
| 11 | (United States) Claudia Dickey | |

=== Assist of the Week ===
| Week | Player | Ref. |
|---|---|---|
| 17 | (United States) Sofia Huerta | |

=== Team awards ===
The Reign announced team awards on November 14.

- MVP: (United States) Claudia Dickey
- Defender of the Year: (United States) Jordyn Bugg
- Young Player of the Year: (United States) Sally Menti
- Golden Boot: (Wales) Jess Fishlock (6 G, 2 A)
- Community Champion: (United States) Cassie Miller
- Lu Barnes Award: (United States) Lauren Barnes
