= Seattle Reign FC =

Women's soccer team based in Seattle, Washington

- Founded: November 21, 2012
- Stadium: Lumen Field; Seattle, Washington
- Capacity: 10,000 (Note: Lumen Field has a capacity of 68,740; standard configuration for Reign games seats 10,000 but can expand based on demand for individual games.)
- Owners: The Carlyle Group (majority); Seattle Sounders FC
- Governor: Adrian Hanauer
- Head coach: Laura Harvey
- League: National Women's Soccer League
- 2026: Regular season: 8th of 16; Playoffs: Quarter-finals
- Website: reignfc.com
Home colors	Away colors	Third colors

Seattle Reign Starting XI in 2026

Seattle Reign FC, previously known as Reign FC and OL Reign, is an American professional soccer team based in Seattle that competes in the National Women's Soccer League (NWSL). Founded in 2012, it is one of eight inaugural members of the NWSL. Since June 2024, the Reign are owned by the private equity firm the Carlyle Group and Major League Soccer club Seattle Sounders FC. The team has reached the NWSL Championship three times (2014, 2015, 2023), losing each time.

In 2020, OL Groupe, the parent company of French clubs Olympique Lyonnais and Olympique Lyonnais Féminin, became the team's majority owner and the team played as OL Reign from 2020 to 2023. Laura Harvey is the team's head coach; she led the team to two consecutive NWSL Shield wins in 2014 and 2015 and a third in 2022.

Seattle Reign FC has played its home matches at Lumen Field since 2022. The team previously played at the Starfire Sports Complex in Tukwila (2013), Memorial Stadium (2014–2018), and Cheney Stadium in Tacoma (2019–2021).

== History ==
=== Establishment ===
Although Seattle never had a professional women's soccer team in the Women's United Soccer Association nor Women's Professional Soccer (WPS) during either league's existence, the city was home to Seattle Sounders Women, a USL W-League team mainly composed of amateur players that was affiliated with Seattle Sounders FC of Major League Soccer; following news of the imminent demise of WPS in January 2012, a handful of players from the United States women's national soccer team (USWNT) joined the Sounders Women for part of the 2012 W-League season. The Athletic cited the resulting close relationship between the Sounders Women and the United States Soccer Federation (USSF) in conditioning the USWNT players, along with significant fan interest generated during their stint with the team, as major factors that led the USSF to consider Seattle as a viable candidate for a team in a new professional league.

In response to the demise of WPS, the USSF announced in June that it would found a new professional women's soccer league (later named National Women's Soccer League) and invite prospective team owners to submit applications. Bill Predmore, founder and CEO of Seattle-based digital marketing agency, POP, submitted his application pitch for a team tentatively named Seattle Sirens FC. In November 2012, it was confirmed that Predmore's application had been accepted and there would be a Seattle-based women's professional soccer team in 2013. On December 19, 2012, the team name was unveiled as Seattle Reign FC, named in honor of the 1990s Seattle Reign women's basketball team. Amy Carnell, a former general manager of the Sounders Women and Sounders FC's director of youth programs, was named general manager of the Reign.

=== 2013: Inaugural season ===
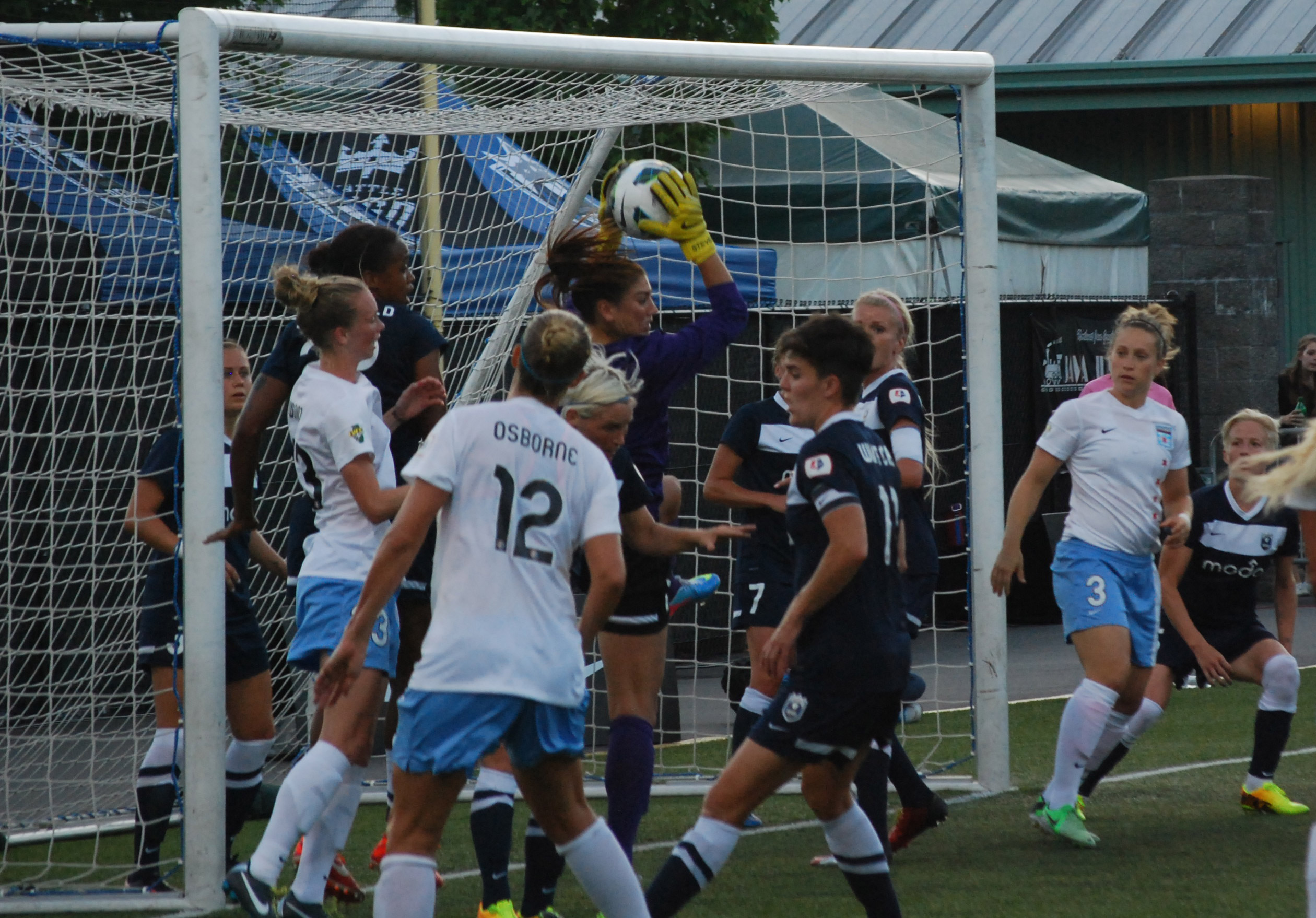
Goalkeeper Hope Solo makes a save during a match against the Chicago Red Stars on July 25, 2013, at Starfire Stadium in Tukwila, Washington.

On December 21, 2012, the team announced Laura Harvey as its first head coach. Harvey was head coach of Arsenal L.F.C. from 2010 to 2012 after serving as an assistant for two years, assisted and then coached Birmingham City L.F.C. from 2002 to 2008, and served as an assistant coach for England's U-17, U-19 and U-23 women's national teams from 2005 to 2011. Before the regular season, Harvey took over as general manager after Amy Carnell resigned.

On January 11, 2013, Kaylyn Kyle, Teresa Noyola, Megan Rapinoe, Amy Rodriguez, Jenny Ruiz, Hope Solo, and Emily Zurrer were named to the team as part of the NWSL Player Allocation. On January 18, the Reign selected Christine Nairn, Mallory Schaffer, Kristen Meier, and Haley Kopmeyer at the 2013 NWSL College Draft. On February 4, 2013, it was announced that the team had signed four free agents: Kate Deines, Jess Fishlock, Tiffany Cameron, and Lindsay Taylor. During the 2013 NWSL Supplemental Draft, the team selected Nikki Krzysik, Lauren Barnes, Laura Heyboer, Liz Bogus, Michelle Betos and Kaley Fountain.

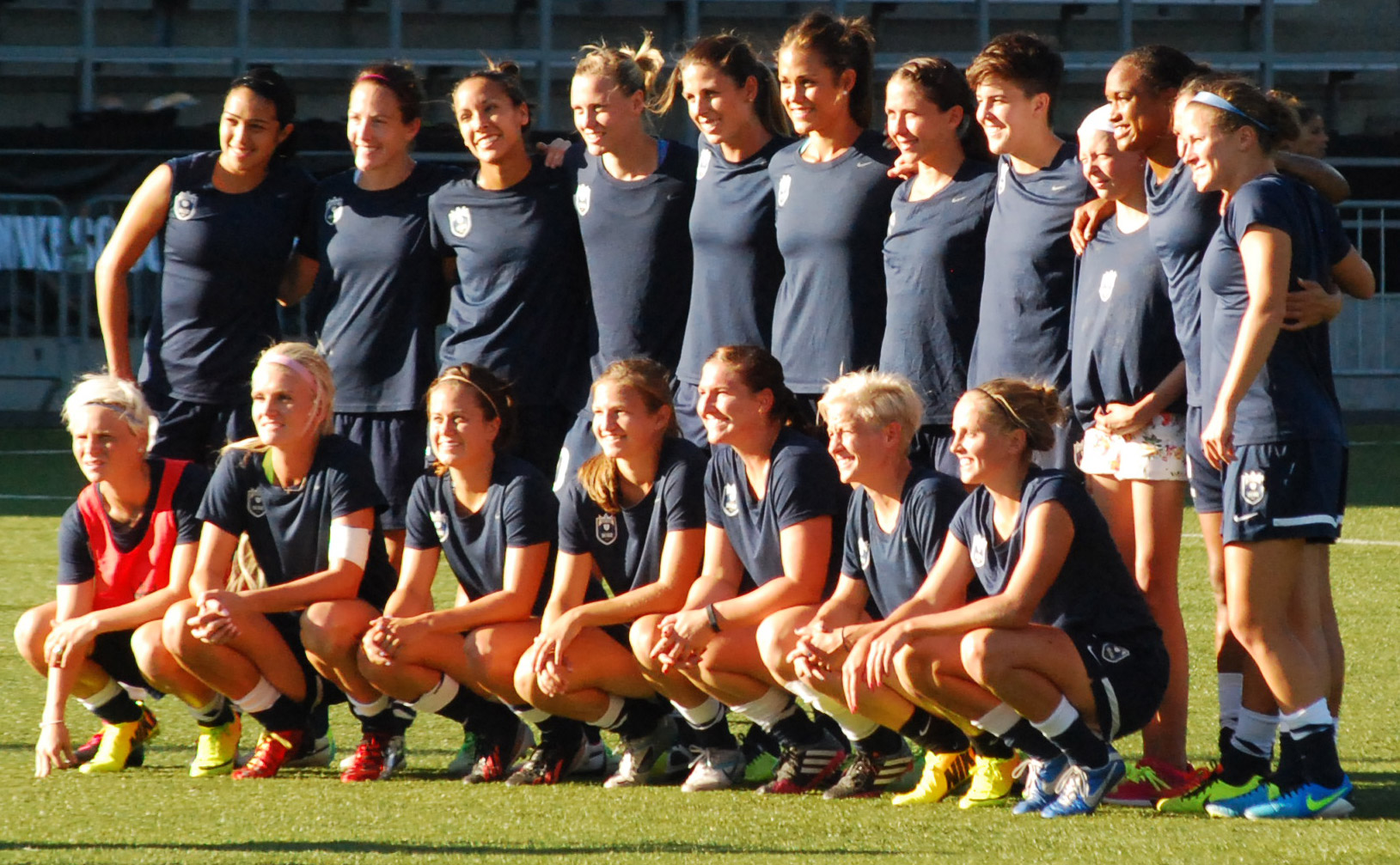
Seattle Reign FC posed for a photo before a match against the Chicago Red Stars on July 25, 2013.

Leading into the preseason, it was learned that the Reign would be without all of their American allocated players for almost half of the season. Amy Rodriguez announced she was pregnant with her first child and would not be playing during the inaugural season. Hope Solo would be away for the first part of the season after recovering from wrist surgery and Megan Rapinoe had already signed with French club Olympique Lyonnais from January to June and would miss at least nine games. After traveling to Japan in the preseason to play matches against defending L. League champion INAC Kobe Leonessa, Fukuoka J. Anclas, and Nojima Stella Kanagawa, the Reign faced their first regular season match against the Chicago Red Stars at Benedictine University, in which Seattle's first college draft pick Christine Nairn scored the Reign's first goal of the season via a header off an assist from Liz Bogus. The point that Seattle earned in the game would be its only for the next nine games.

In June 2013, head coach Laura Harvey began making some trades and signing new international players. With the trades and the return of Solo and Rapinoe, the Reign began to turn the season around with a 1–1 tie against the Western New York Flash. The game would be the first of a six-game undefeated streak for the Reign with two ties and four wins. After losing to regional rival Portland Thorns FC 2–1 in the season finale in front of a sold-out crowd of 3,855, the Reign ended the 2013 NWSL season seventh in the league with a 5–14–3 record.

=== 2014–2018: Seattle years ===
==== 2014 season ====
During the 2014 season, the Reign set a league record unbeaten streak of 16 games. During the 16-game stretch, the Reign compiled a 13–0–3 record. The streak came to an end July 12, 2014, in a match against the Chicago Red Stars that ended 1–0 in favor of the Red Stars The team finished first in the regular season clinching the NWSL Shield for the first time. After defeating the Washington Spirit 2–1 in the playoff semifinals, the Reign was defeated 2–1 by FC Kansas City during the championship final. Following the regular season, the team earned several league awards. Kim Little won the Golden Boot and Most Valuable Player awards; Laura Harvey was named Coach of the Year; Kendall Fletcher, Jess Fishlock, Little and Nahomi Kawasumi were named to the NWSL Best XI team while goalkeeper Hope Solo and defenders Lauren Barnes and Stephanie Cox were named to the Second XI team.

==== 2015 season ====
The Reign finished the 2015 season in first place clinching the NWSL Shield for the second consecutive time. After defeating the Washington Spirit 3–0 in a playoff semifinal, the Reign was defeated 1–0 by FC Kansas City during the championship final in Portland. Following the regular season, the team earned several league award nominations. Kim Little, Jess Fishlock, and Bev Yanez were nominated for league Most Valuable Player, Laura Harvey was nominated for Coach of the Year; and Lauren Barnes and Kendall Fletcher were nominated for Defender of the Year.

Laura Harvey was ultimately named Coach of the Year for a second consecutive year. Barnes, Little, Yanez, and Fishlock were named to the NWSL Best XI team while Kendall Fletcher, Stephanie Cox, Megan Rapinoe, and Keelin Winters were named to the Second XI team.

==== 2016 season ====
The Reign finished the 2016 season in fifth place with a 8–6–8 record, narrowly missing a playoff spot by two points. The season was complicated by a number of players being unavailable during the early part of the season due to injury including Manon Melis, Jess Fishlock and Megan Rapinoe. In early July, Nahomi Kawasumi returned to the Reign for the first time since the 2014 season and scored a brace in her first match with the team. Rachel Corsie and Haley Kopmeyer suffered injuries during a match in July against the Western New York Flash that was controversially played on a baseball field. Schedule changes from previous years were announced in February that resulted in an imbalance amongst team matchups.

In late August, the Reign announced that Hope Solo was taking a leave of absence for the remainder of the season after being suspended from the U.S. national team. In September, four-year team captain Keelin Winters announced her retirement for the end of the season. On October 17, midfielder Kim Little announced that she would leave the Reign and return to Arsenal. Harvey said Little was given an "incredible offer" of a multi-year contract, though no other details were disclosed.

==== 2017 season ====
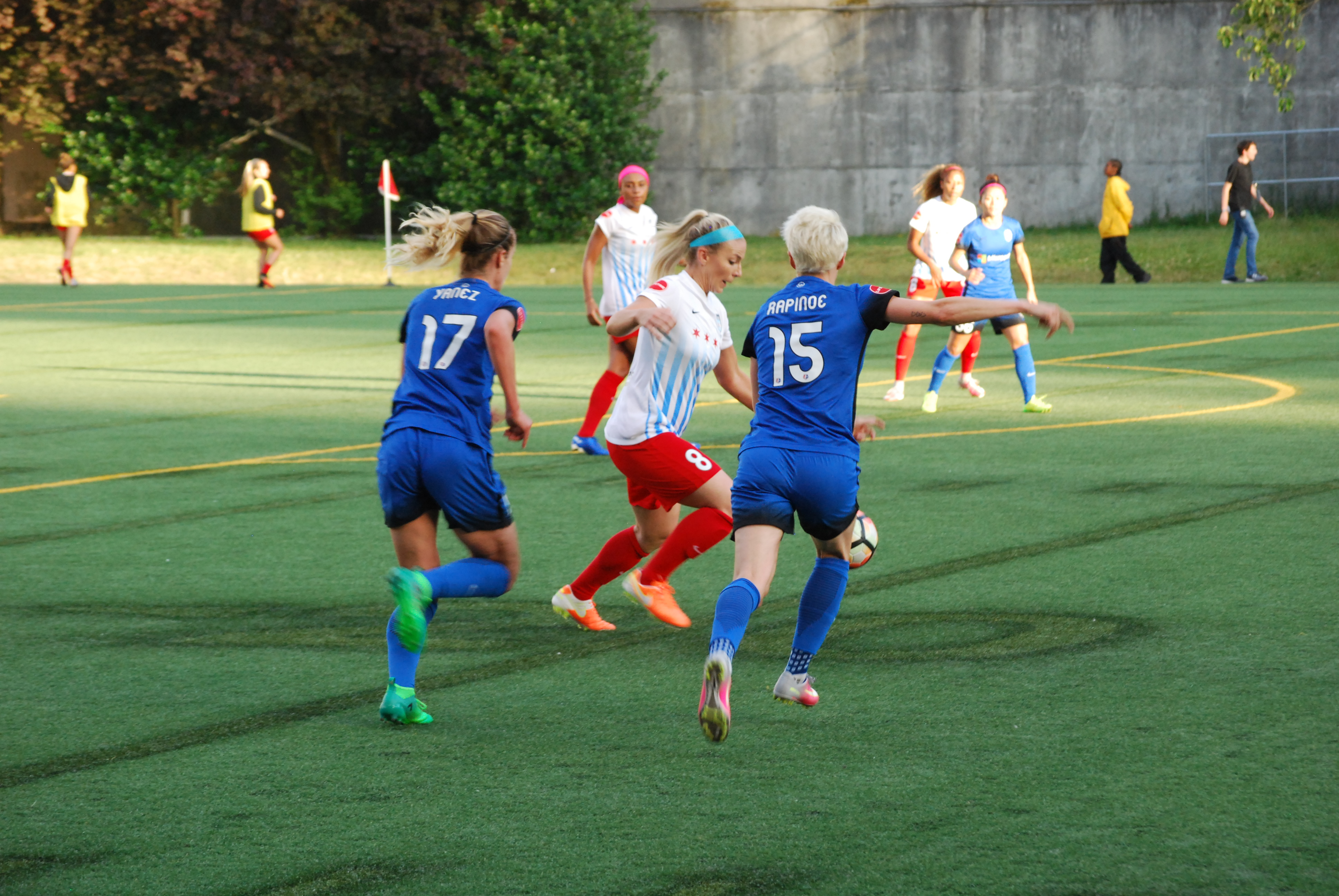
Seattle Reign forwards Beverly Yanez and Megan Rapinoe in a match against the Chicago Red Stars, June 28, 2017.

Following the loss of core players Kim Little and Keelin Winters following the 2016 season, the Reign faced a bit of re-structuring for the 2017 season. Three 2017 NWSL College Draft rookies were signed including defender Maddie Bauer, forward Katie Johnson, and midfielder Kristen McNabb. With Kim Little moving back to Arsenal, the Reign re-signed attacking midfielder Christine Nairn, who had played for the team during its inaugural season. The team also signed Canadian international Diana Matheson and Australian international Larissa Crummer, though they spent the majority of the season injured, as well as New Zealand international defender Rebekah Stott. The Reign finished in fifth place for the second consecutive season narrowly missing a playoff spot after losing 1–0 to Kansas City. Megan Rapinoe was the team's leading scorer (and league's third highest) with 12 goals. Her season performance contributed to her nomination as FIFA World Player of the Year the following year.

==== 2018 season ====
After two consecutive seasons of fifth-place finishes and thus outside of the playoffs, head coach and general manager Laura Harvey stepped down and was replaced by former rival Vlatko Andonovski as new head coach of the team. The amicable transition nonetheless led to new vision for the team and new players, with Andonovski bringing in 11 new players on the season-opening roster. Notably, Andonovski traded for US international Allie Long and Australian international Steph Catley, while English international Jodie Taylor and Danish international Theresa Nielsen joined on free transfers from abroad. The refreshed team performed well throughout the season and remained largely in second place behind a dominant North Carolina Courage team, until a loss to Cascadia rival Portland Thorns FC at the end of the regular season dropped it to third place. This set up a semi-final rematch with the Thorns FC away from home, which the team lost 2–1. Despite the late slide, Andonovski led the team back to the playoffs for the first time since 2015 in his first season in charge.

=== 2019–2021: Relocation to Tacoma ===
On January 30, 2019, the team announced that it would relocate to Cheney Stadium in Tacoma for the 2019 season and re-brand itself as Reign FC. This relocation, as well as two new minority ownership groups (Mikal Thomsen, owner of the Tacoma Rainiers and Adrian Hanauer, owner of the Seattle Sounders FC, as well as his mother, philanthropist Lenore Hanauer), secured the team's long-term future by addressing long-standing stadium issues. A new soccer-specific 5,000 capacity stadium that would host Reign and Tacoma Defiance games was planned adjacent to Cheney Stadium.

==== 2019 season ====
In their first season playing in Tacoma, the Reign finished 4th in the regular season, to qualify for the NWSL Playoffs but were knocked out by the North Carolina Courage in the semi-final.

==== 2020 season ====
Due to the COVID-19 pandemic, the regular season was cancelled in 2020. Instead, the newly renamed OL Reign took part in the 2020 NWSL Challenge Cup and the NWSL Fall Series.

==== 2021 season ====
Head coach Farid Benstiti resigned in July for undisclosed reasons; a joint investigation by the league and the players' association in December 2022 found that he abused players by "weight-shaming" them. The Reign finished 2nd in the regular season, led first by interim coach Sam Laity and then by Laura Harvey after her return. They fell once again in the semi-final, this time to the eventual champions Washington Spirit.

=== Since 2022: Return to Seattle ===
==== 2022 season ====
The club announced in December 2021 that it would be returning to Seattle with Lumen Field as their new home stadium while continuing to train and operate out of Tacoma. In the Challenge Cup, the Reign finished first in the West Division and earned the top seed overall but lost in the semifinal against the Washington Spirit in a penalty shoot-out. The team also won the mid-season invitational Women's Cup final against Louisville. In their final regular-season match, the Reign won the 2022 NWSL Shield, the team's third.

==== 2023 season ====
The Reign moved their training facility to Starfire Sports. The club will become Starfire's main soccer tenant and operate out of there in 2024, after Seattle Sounders FC moves to their own facility. The team finished the 2023 season as runners-up in the NWSL Championship, losing 2–1 to NJ/NY Gotham FC. At the end of this season, forward Megan Rapinoe announced her retirement after eleven seasons with the club.

==== 2024 season ====
Prior to the 2024 season, it was announced that OL Groupe was putting the team up for sale. With OL ownership inevitably ending, the club returned to its original Seattle Reign FC name. The badge was also changed to an updated version of the original, featuring a gold crown instead of silver. The impending sale of the team created a period of uncertainty, which contributed to the club failing to retain some of the key players who had led them to the prior year's Championship match. Free agents such as USWNT stars Rose Lavelle and Emily Sonnet signed with other teams during the off season. Throughout the 2024 season, the team struggled, and finished with a record of 6–5–15. This left them in the 13th position out of 14 teams, and missing playoffs. In June, it was announced that Seattle Sounders and The Carlyle Group had purchased the team for $58 million.

==== 2025 season ====
After a disappointing prior year, the Seattle Reign FC front office acted to improve the roster of the club. In December 2024, Seattle Reign traded midfielder Jaelin Howell for goalkeeper Cassie Miller and USWNT forward and all-time NWSL leading goalscorer Lynn Biyendolo The team also signed forward Maddie Dahlien, who had just won the NCAA Championship with the North Carolina Tar Heels in the fall of 2024. In July 2025, the club signed Mia Fishel. Fishel had been with Chlesea FC the two years prior, but missed significant playing time during that period due to a torn ACL. Prior to Chelsea, Mia Fishel won the Golden Boot in the 2022 Apertura season of Liga MX Femenil while leading the team to a title.

The roster modifications and continued development of young players led Seattle Reign to improve their performance from the season prior. The team never lost more than two matches in a row, and ended the season with a five-game unbeaten streak. The club finished with a record of 10–9–7, and placed 5th out of 14 teams. Seattle qualified for playoffs, and were matched up again Orlando Pride in the quarterfinals. Orlando beat Seattle 2–0 to eliminate the Reign from the post-season.

Defender Jordyn Bugg was nominated for the FIFA Marta Award for her first professional goal, which was scored from 35 yards out during a match against the North Carolina Courage on March 22. Bugg was also a nominee for NWSL Defender or the year, and made the NWSL Second Best XI. Goalkeeper Claudia Dickey was nominated for NWSL Goalkeeper of the year, and was also named to the Second Best XI. Additionally, forward Maddie Dahlien was a finalist for NWSL Rookie of the Year.

== Colors and badge ==
Historical badges

2013–2018 (primary)

2020–2023 (primary)

On December 19, 2012, the team's name was unveiled as Seattle Reign FC. The team's colors were announced as white, platinum, royal blue and midnight black along with a neon green away colors The name was selected in part as homage to the first professional women's sports team in Seattle, the Seattle Reign, a defunct professional basketball team in the American Basketball League. That team was in turn named after its location in King County, and as a pun alluding to Seattle's rainy climate. In conjunction with the colors, the team also released its primary and alternate badges: the primary badge features a queen wearing a platinum crown (in a reference to the team name), while the alternate badge is monochrome and foregrounds the crown itself.

Owner Bill Predmore stated, "Today's announcement is the result of a thoughtful process to identify the name that best represents the values of our club, articulates our long-term ambitions and celebrates the community within which our supporters live. Reign FC meets all of those objectives and at the same time honors the legacy of professional women's sports in Seattle. Like the Seattle Sounders, whose fans selected a name that honored those who pioneered the sport of soccer in Seattle in the early 1970s, Seattle Reign FC was, in part, selected to pay homage those visionaries – the leaders and players of the Seattle Reign women's basketball team – who pioneered professional women's sports in Seattle."

On January 30, 2019, it was announced that the team would relocate to Tacoma, Washington, and rename as simply Reign FC. As part of the rebrand, the team released a slightly modified visual identity and a new primary team badge that removed the word "Seattle" from the original badge.

Following the acquisition of the team by OL Groupe in January 2020, the team announced another rebrand on March 6, 2020, as OL Reign, with new primary colors of blue, white, and gold to match those from Olympique Lyonnais and a new team badge that includes the lion as a symbol for Lyon.

The team returned to its original name of Seattle Reign FC on January 9, 2024, with a modified version of the original crest. The crest remains primarily blue and black with gold used for the crown to symbolize the team's NWSL Shields.

=== Kit history ===
To date, all Reign uniforms have been manufactured by Nike, due to the league's exclusive outfitting agreement with that company. Throughout its branding eras, the team's home color has primarily been blue, although black and white have been worn.

2013 Home	2014–15 Home	2016–17 Home	2018–19 Home	2020 Home	2021–22 Home	2023 Home	2024–25 Home

2013 Away	2014 Away	2015 Away	2016 Away	2017–18 Away	2019 Away	2020 Away	2021 Away	2022–23 Away	2024 Away	2025– Away

2015 Third	2026 Third

=== Sponsorship ===
In April 2013, Moda Health was announced as the team's jersey sponsor. The company remained the jersey sponsor for the 2014 and 2015 seasons. In 2016, Microsoft was named as the New Jersey sponsor and "presenting partner". The team also uses Microsoft technology on and off the pitch as part of the partnership.

In January 2019, Seattle-based online retailer Zulily was announced as the team's new presenting partner and third-ever jersey sponsor. On the same day, Seattle Sounders FC also announced Zulily as its new jersey partner, making it the first time that both men's and women's professional soccer teams in Seattle share the same jersey sponsor and Seattle only the second-ever American city to hold this distinction. Despite no longer being the jersey sponsor, Microsoft remains the team's technology partner and will continue to provide sports analytics to the coaching staff. During an unveiling event for the new secondary jersey in April 2019, aerospace corporation Boeing was announced as a kit sponsor for a slot on the back of both jerseys. The jersey partnership with Zulily concluded after the 2020 season.

Heading into the 2021 season, the Reign started featuring the Black Future Co-op Fund on the front of their jerseys as an in-kind donation to the Fund, until they could secure a new sponsorship. While the search for a front-of-jersey sponsor continued, Tacoma-based healthcare group MultiCare Health System was announced as a back-of-kit sponsor (alongside Boeing) at the start of the 2022 regular season.

Before the 2025 season, the Reign announced that the Black Future Co-op Fund would no longer be featured as the club continued its search for a front-of-jersey sponsor. In October 2025, after nearly five years, the Reign secured Seattle-based pet insurance provider Trupanion as the club's new front-of-jersey sponsor.

Seasons	Jersey manufacturer	Front-of-jersey sponsor
2013–2015	Nike	Moda Health
2016–2018	Nike	Microsoft
2019–2020	Nike	Zulily
2021–2024	Nike	Black Future Co-op Fund (Note: The Reign "donated [their] front-of-kit position to the Black Future Co-op Fund through a player-led initiative" while they searched for a traditional sponsor.)
Since 2025	Nike	Trupanion

== Stadium ==
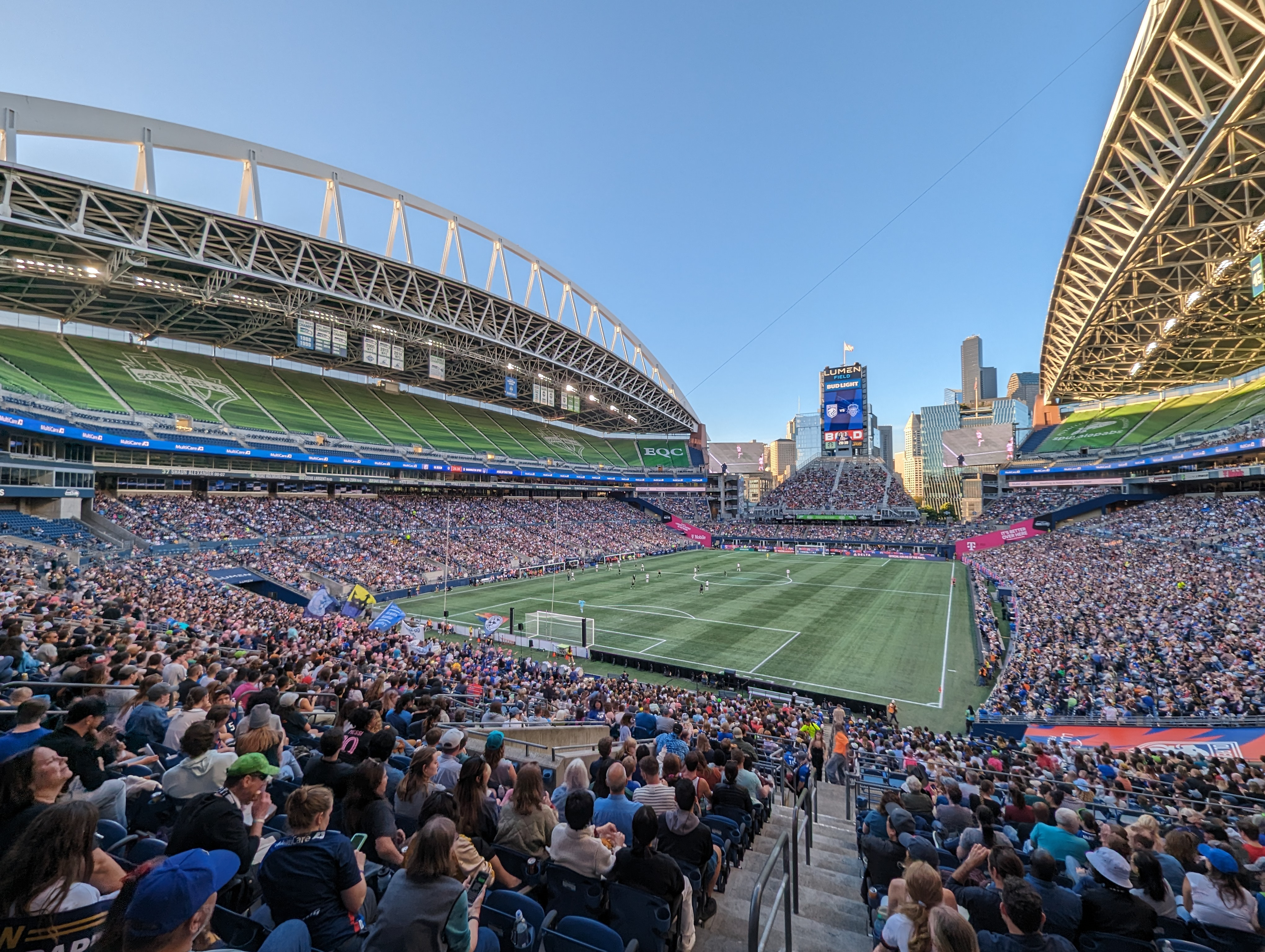
Seattle Reign FC have played their home matches at Lumen Field on a regular basis since 2022.

During the inaugural season of the NWSL, Reign FC played at Starfire Stadium in Tukwila, Washington. The stadium is located approximately 12 miles from downtown Seattle and is the training facility for Seattle Sounders FC, as well as where the Sounders play their U.S. Open Cup matches. With a seating capacity for 4,500 spectators, the stadium also features a press box with full scoreboard and sound system capabilities. The pitch features FieldTurf.

In February 2014, it was announced that the team would be moving to Memorial Stadium, located at the Seattle Center, for at least the 2014 and 2015 seasons; the Reign chose to remain there beyond the originally intended two seasons. The stadium features an artificial turf pitch that was installed in 2013 and a seating capacity of 12,000 spectators, although seating capacity was set at 6,000 for the beginning of the 2014 season. The stadium was the previous home of the Seattle Sounders from 1974 to 1975 when the team played in the North American Soccer League (NASL) and from 1995 to 2002 when the new incarnation of the team played in the A-League.

In late 2017, the team's future in Seattle beyond 2018 was seen as uncertain due to issues with Memorial Stadium. The facility does not meet league standards for playing surfaces set to be enforced in 2019. Additionally, the stadium is owned by the Seattle School District, which has announced plans to build a new high school in that area of the city, with the stadium being the most likely site. The Reign were seen by national soccer media as lacking viable options for a replacement—other possible venues in the region are problematic due to size, location, or ancillary facilities. Reign FC owner Bill Predmore initially responded that, despite these challenges, the team would remain at Memorial Stadium for 2019. However, newly enforced standards by U.S. Soccer and NWSL made this untenable, and the team relocated to Tacoma, Washington, in January 2019. The Reign planned to play temporarily at Cheney Stadium while a soccer-specific stadium shared with Tacoma Defiance was constructed. The new venue was originally set to open in 2021, but has since been delayed indefinitely due to feasibility issues caused by the COVID-19 pandemic. During their time in Tacoma, the team leased a practice field from Bellarmine Preparatory School and shared space with Foss High School.

In December 2021, The Reign announced that Lumen Field will become its home stadium beginning in 2022. Lumen Field has a capacity of 68,740; standard configuration for Reign games seats 10,000 but can expand based on demand for individual games. With the move back to Seattle, the team also exited the planned soccer-specific stadium project in Tacoma. The team also moved their practice facilities to Starfire Sports prior to the 2023 season; the team were allocated a new field that would be used until they replaced the Sounders, who moved to their new Longacres facility in 2024. After the Reign were acquired by the Sounders ownership group, plans to share the new Longacres facility were discussed by the two teams.

== Broadcasting ==
As of 2020, NWSL matches are broadcast on CBS Sports Network and Paramount+. International viewers can watch on nwslsoccer.com. In 2023, the league announced additional international streaming deals with DAZN and Tigo.

From 2013 to 2016, Seattle Reign games were streamed live by Bootstrapper Studios via YouTube. The broadcasts were called by KOMO News Radio Sports Director, Tom Glasgow, with color commentary provided by Lesle Gallimore, head coach of the Washington Huskies. During the 2013 season, a select number of league games were broadcast on Fox Sports. During the 2014 season, several league games were broadcast by ESPN.

In March 2015, the team became one of the first sports teams to use the newly released app Periscope to stream a preseason friendly against the Portland Pilots. In 2015, six select regular season games and the playoff matches were broadcast by Fox Soccer. The playoff final featuring Reign FC and FC Kansas City set what was then a league record, averaging 167,000 viewers on Fox Sports 1 – an increase of 7 percent compared to the 2014 final broadcast on ESPN2. That record stood until the 2016 NWSL finals between Western New York and Washington, which averaged more than 180,000 viewers.

In 2017, Reign games were streamed exclusively by Go90 for American audiences and via the NWSL website for international viewers. As part of a three-year agreement with A&E Networks, Lifetime broadcasts one NWSL Game of the Week on Saturday afternoons. For the 2017 season, the Reign were featured in nationally televised Lifetime NWSL Game of the Week broadcasts on May 27, July 8, August 26, and September 9, 2017. During the 2018 season, Lifetime match broadcasts featuring Seattle include May 5, July 21, and August 11, 2018.

In 2024, 11 Reign games were available on KONG-TV through a local broadcast partnership with KING 5 Media Group. KCPQ took over as the Reign's local station for 2025.

== Supporters ==
The first supporters group formed for the Reign is the Royal Guard. Founded by Matt Banks and Kiana Coleman in April 2013, the group became the first organized supporters group for a women's professional sports team in Washington state's history. Other supporters groups for the team have included Fortune's Favourites and Queen Anne Collective.

== Rivalries ==
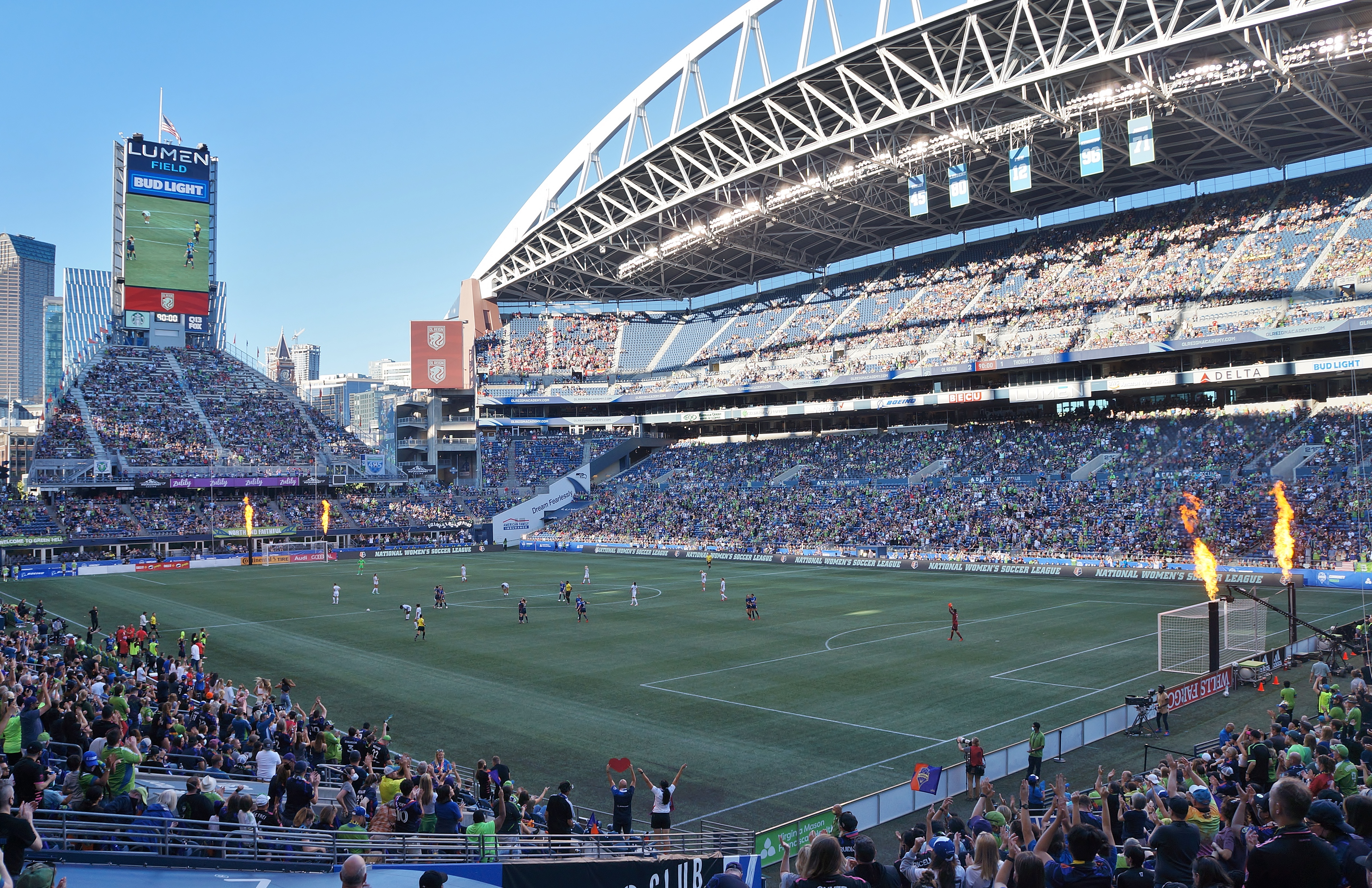
Rivalry match against Portland Thorns FC at Lumen Field in August 2021

Like the Seattle Sounders FC rivalry with the Portland Timbers, the Reign has a long-standing regional rivalry with Portland Thorns FC. In May 2015, a match between the two teams in Portland set a new attendance record with 21,144 fans cheering in the stadium. Their August 29, 2021, meeting was played at Lumen Field in Seattle as part of a doubleheader with the Sounders and Timbers, drawing 27,248 spectators to break the league's attendance record.

After losing twice to FC Kansas City during the NWSL championship final in 2014 and 2015 despite winning first place in the league, the Reign also considered FC Kansas City to be a rival. However, Kansas City folded after the 2017 season, with their head coach Vlatko Andonovski joining the Reign.

An expansion team returned to the Kansas City area in 2021, and the rivalry was revived in 2022 when the Kansas City Current won the playoff semifinal in front of a record-breaking crowd of 21,491 in Seattle. A team from Kansas City has eliminated the Reign in the playoffs in all three of the club's Shield-winning seasons.

== Ownership and management ==
Seattle Reign FC was wholly owned by Bill and Teresa Predmore from its establishment until January 2019. Bill Predmore was a co-founder and the CEO of POP, a Seattle-based digital marketing agency. Prior to the start of the first season, Predmore stated, "Ultimately, my goal is to build the best women's club in the world. That won't happen tomorrow or this year, but in 10 years or 20 years that's where we want to be." Predmore's wife, Teresa, played college soccer at Oregon State University and soccer is one of her lifelong passions.

Leading up to the inaugural season of the NWSL, Amy Carnell was named general manager for the team. Within a week of regular season play, Carnell resigned from her position citing "personal reasons" and head coach Laura Harvey assumed the role – a setup similar to what she was used to as coach of the Arsenal L.F.C. in England.

Following the 2017 season, Laura Harvey resigned as general manager and head coach of the team, and Vlatko Andonovski was hired from FC Kansas City as the new head coach. Andonovski and Harvey had been the two most successful coaches in NWSL history, with three Coach of the Year awards and four trophies between them, and Andonovski was the only replacement Harvey endorsed. Andonovski further complimented Harvey's positive impacts and committed to continue playing a "beautiful game" with the Reign.

Before the 2018 season, the team announced an agreement with Force 10 Sports Management, LLC, for it to manage ticket sales and services. Force 10 Sports Management owns and operates the Seattle Storm, a standalone professional women's basketball team in the WNBA, much like the Reign.

On January 30, 2019, the Reign announced that it would move to Tacoma, Washington. As part of the move, the team announced two new minority owners: the Baseball Club of Tacoma LLC (the owner and operator of the Tacoma Rainiers, led by Mikal Thomsen), as well as Seattle Sounders FC majority owner Adrian Hanauer and his mother Lenore Hanauer. Bill and Teresa Predmore remained the team's majority owners, and Bill the team president, after the additional investments. The relocation also brought previous management agreement with Force 10 Sports Management to an end, with the Tacoma Rainiers taking over similar responsibilities at Cheney Stadium.

After winning the 2019 NWSL Coach of the Year award, head coach Vlatko Andonovski resigned to manage the United States women's national soccer team on October 28, 2019. As his departure had been anticipated, co-owner and president Bill Predmore had already begun the search for Andonovski's successor since early September.

On November 25, 2019, majority owner Bill Predmore announced his entry into exclusive negotiations to sell the team to OL Groupe, the parent company of French clubs Olympique Lyonnais and Olympique Lyonnais Féminin. Jean-Michel Aulas, president of OL Groupe, had been public about his desire to acquire an NWSL team as part of Lyon's international ambitions. After the sale was completed, previous majority owners Bill and Teresa Predmore retained a minority stake in the team, while previous minority owners Adrian Hanauer and Tacoma Soccer Ventures no longer had ownership positions. On December 19, 2019, the team announced that the parties entered into a definitive agreement for the sale to be completed in January 2020. The team's total assets were valued at $3.51 million, and OL Groupe would pay $3.145 million to acquire an 89.5 percent ownership stake in the team. It was also announced on the same day that French basketball player Tony Parker, a business partner of OL Groupe, would also pay to acquire a 3% ownership stake, that Aulas would become chairman of the team's board of directors, and that a chief operating officer would be appointed to support the CEO Bill Predmore. OL Groupe executive Vincent Berthillot was later appointed as the COO.

On January 17, 2020, French coach Farid Benstiti was announced as the third head coach in team history. This was followed by the announcement that the team would rebrand as "OL Reign" as part of the takeover. Gérard Houllier was appointed the team's technical director in November 2020, but he died a month later. Benstiti resigned on July 2, 2021. On July 15, 2021, the team announced that Laura Harvey would return as head coach after the Tokyo Olympics.

On September 30, 2021, CEO Bill Predmore confirmed that he asked for former head coach Farid Benstiti's resignation after a player reported inappropriate comments made by Benstiti. Despite a formal complaint being made to the NWSL, Predmore did not disclose details behind Benstiti's resignation at the time. Benstiti was initially hired despite allegations of similar behavior in the past, and Predmore's withholding of information continues a pattern of institutional failure in the NWSL where coaches and personnel under investigation for misconduct were allowed to leave quietly and take up other positions where they could still do harm.

In February 2022, club founders Bill and Teresa Predmore announced that they would step down from their operational roles as club CEO and president of the club's youth academy, respectively, while remaining as the club's minority owners. Former COO Vincent Berthillot succeeded Bill Predmore as the club's CEO, while a general manager dedicated to soccer operations would be appointed. Later that month, the club announced Nick Perera, captain of the United States men's national beach soccer team, as the new general manager after serving as executive director of Washington Youth Soccer. Perera departed the club in March 2023.

In April 2023, Washington Spirit owner Michele Kang announced plans to purchase a majority stake in OL Féminin. As both the Reign and OL Féminin were owned by OL Groupe, Kang's plans would create a conflict of interest between the Reign and the Spirit. As a result, OL Groupe announced its intent to sell the Reign and hired the investment bank Raine Group to organize the sale process. While the sale process is ongoing, the Reign announced Lesle Gallimore as the club's new general manager in May 2023. In October 2023, OL Groupe also announced that it had bought out Bill and Teresa Predmore's 7.5% ownership stake for $2 million at some point after June 30, 2023. Although OL Groupe still retained its ownership for another few months, the team's affiliation with Olympique Lyonnais and OL Féminin ended after December 31, 2023. The team subsequently returned to its original name of Seattle Reign FC on January 9, 2024, while the sale process continued as of February 8, 2024.

On March 17, 2024, it was announced that the private equity firm the Carlyle Group, in collaboration with Seattle Sounders FC, had reached a deal to purchase OL Groupe's 97% stake in Seattle Reign for $58 million; the purchase is subject to approval from the NWSL and MLS. The transaction was finalized on June 17, 2024, with Tony Parker's 3% stake included in the transaction as well. While the Carlyle Group is the majority owner, the Sounders are the Reign's managing owner and Adrian Hanauer is representing the team on the league's board of governors.

=== Ownership history ===
Tenure	Owners	Ref.
Founding – January 29, 2019	Bill and Teresa Predmore	
January 30, 2019 – January 2020	Bill and Teresa Predmore (majority)	
January 30, 2019 – January 2020	Adrian and Lenore Hanauer	
January 30, 2019 – January 2020	The Baseball Club of Tacoma LLC/Tacoma Soccer Ventures	
January 2020 – 2023 (Note: In 2023, OL Groupe bought out Bill and Teresa Predmore's ownership stake at some point between June 30, when its 2022–23 fiscal year ended, and October 31, when it published its 2022–23 fiscal year annual report.)	OL Groupe (89.5%)	
January 2020 – 2023	Bill and Teresa Predmore (7.5%)	
January 2020 – 2023	Tony Parker (3%)	
2023 – June 16, 2024	OL Groupe (97%)	
2023 – June 16, 2024	Tony Parker (3%)	
Since June 17, 2024	The Carlyle Group (majority)	
Since June 17, 2024	Seattle Sounders FC	

=== Executive history ===
This table lists only the highest-level executive at the club at any given time during the club's history.

Name	Tenure	Title	Ref.
Amy Carnell	Founding – April 7, 2013	General manager	
Laura Harvey	April 8, 2013 – November 6, 2017	General manager	
Bill Predmore	November 7, 2017 – January 2020	President	
Bill Predmore	January 2020 – February 1, 2022	Chief executive officer	
Vincent Berthillot	February 2, 2022 – June 16, 2024	Chief executive officer	
Maya Mendoza-Exstrom	Since June 17, 2024	Chief business officer	

== Academy ==
The team operates the Reign Academy, a youth soccer organization with multiple age levels based in Renton, Washington. The academy was founded in 2017 and affiliated with the U.S. Soccer Development Academy system until the organization was dissolved in 2020. The Reign have been a member of the Girls Academy since 2020. The Reign also operate an amateur team, Seattle Reign FC II, that joined the Women's Premier Soccer League in 2024.

In June 2025, Neeku Purcell became the first Reign Academy player to sign a first-team contract with the club.

== Players and staff ==
=== Squad ===
As of October 6, 2026.

No.	Pos.	Nation	Player
1	GK	USA	Claudia Dickey
2	MF	USA	Maddie Mercado
5	FW	USA	Maddie Dahlien
6	FW	USA	Lynn Biyendolo
7	FW	USA	Emeri Adames
8	MF	WAL	Angharad James-Turner
10	MF	WAL	Jess Fishlock
11	DF	USA	Sofia Huerta
12	FW	CAN	Holly Ward
13	FW	USA	Brittany Ratcliffe
14	DF	USA	Emily Mason
16	MF	USA	Ainsley McCammon
17	MF	USA	Sally Menti
18	GK	USA	Evan O'Steen
19	FW	USA	Mia Fishel
20	MF	USA	Sam Meza
21	DF	USA	Phoebe McClernon
22	DF	USA	Ryanne Brown
23	DF	USA	Jordyn Bugg
24	DF	USA	Madison Curry
25	DF	USA	Shae Holmes
27	FW	CIV	Ami Diallo
30	FW	HAI	Nérilia Mondésir
33	FW	USA	Ruby Hladek
38	GK	USA	Cassie Miller

==== Out on loan ====
No.	Pos.	Nation	Player
35	GK	USA	Neeku Purcell (on loan to Dallas Trinity FC through December 31, 2026)
36	MF	PAN	Sofia Cedeño (on loan to Dallas Trinity FC through December 31, 2026)

=== Staff ===
As of August 27, 2026.

Governance
Governor	Adrian Hanauer
Alternate governor	Alex Popov
Executive
Chief business officer	Maya Mendoza-Exstrom
General manager	Lesle Gallimore
Coaching
Head coach	Laura Harvey
Head assistant coach	Scott Parkinson
Assistant coach	Kate Norton
Interim assistant coach	Lauren Barnes
Assistant coach and head of goalkeeping	Lloyd Yaxley

=== Captains ===
Captain	Tenure	Ref.
Keelin Winters	2013–2016	
Jess Fishlock	2017, 2026	
Megan Rapinoe	2018–2022	
Lauren Barnes	2017–2025	
Sofia Huerta	2026	

=== Head coaches ===
As of November 1, 2026.

Head coach	Nat.	Tenure	Matches (Note: Regular-season matches only.)	Win	Draw	Loss	Pts/M	Ref.
Laura Harvey	England	December 21, 2012 – November 6, 2017	110	51	26	33	1.63	
Vlatko Andonovski	North Macedonia	November 7, 2017 – October 28, 2019	48	21	16	11	1.65	
Farid Benstiti	France	January 17, 2020 – July 1, 2021	7	2	1	4	1.00	
Sam Laity (interim)	England	July 2 – August 8, 2021	6	4	0	2	2.00	
Laura Harvey	England	Since August 9, 2021	137	57	31	49	1.47	

== Honors ==
NWSL Championship

- Runners-up (3): 2014, 2015, 2023

NWSL Shield

- Winners (3): 2014, 2015, 2022

The Women's Cup

- Winners (1): 2022

== Records ==
=== Season records ===
Seattle Reign FC seasons
Season	NWSL regular season								Playoffs	Top scorer (Note: All official competitions including playoffs, Challenge Cups, Summer Cups, and the 2020 Fall Series.)	Goals	Attendance (Note: Attendance from NWSL regular-season matches only.)		
Season	P	W	L	D	GF	GA	Pts.	Pos.	Playoffs	Top scorer	Goals	Avg.	High	Total
2013	22	5	14	3	22	36	18	7th	DNQ	(United States) Megan Rapinoe	5	2,306	3,855	25,365
2014	24	**16**	**2**	6	**50**	20	**54**	**Shield**	**Runners-up**	(Scotland) Kim Little	**17♦**	3,632	5,957	43,581
2015	20	13	3	4	41	21	43	**Shield**	**Runners-up**	(Scotland) Kim Little (United States) Bev Yanez	10	4,060	6,303	40,595
2016	20	8	6	6	29	21	30	5th	DNQ	(Netherlands) Manon Melis	7	4,602	5,888	46,018
2017	24	9	8	7	43	37	34	5th	DNQ	(United States) Megan Rapinoe	12	4,037	6,041	48,449
2018	24	11	5	8	27	**19**	41	3rd	Semifinal	(England) Jodie Taylor	9	3,824	5,251	45,885
2019	24	10	6	8	27	27	38	4th	Semifinal	(United States) Bethany Balcer	6	5,213	7,479	62,551
2020	Canceled due to the COVID-19 pandemic								Quarterfinal (Note: Results from the 2020 NWSL Challenge Cup.)	(United States) Bethany Balcer	3	Behind closed doors		
2021	24	13	8	3	37	24	42	2nd	Semifinal	(United States) Bethany Balcer	9	5,240	27,278	62,885
2022	22	11	4	7	32	**19**	40	**Shield**	Semifinal	(United States) Bethany Balcer	9	6,844	10,744	75,289
2023	22	9	8	5	29	24	32	4th	**Runners-up**	(United States) Bethany Balcer (Canada) Jordyn Huitema	7	**13,609**	**42,054**	**149,704**
2024	26	6	15	5	27	44	23	13th	DNQ	(United States) Bethany Balcer	5	8,503	16,598	110,536
2025	26	10	7	**9**	32	29	39	5th	Quarterfinal	(United States) Emeri Adames (Wales) Jess Fishlock	6	7,870	10,117	102,310
2026	**30**	14	11	5	37	33	47	8th	Quarterfinal	(United States) Maddie Mercado	10	7,863	16,095	117,945

♦	League most for season
**bold**	Club record

=== Player records ===
As of November 7, 2025. Current players in bold. Statistics are updated once a year after the conclusion of the NWSL season.

==== Retired jersey numbers ====
- 15: (United States) Megan Rapinoe

==== Most appearances ====
#	Player	Tenure	NWSL	Playoffs	Other cups	Total
1	(United States) Lauren Barnes	2013–2025	252	12	16	280
2	(Wales) **Jess Fishlock**	Since 2013	215	11	16	242
3	(United States) Bethany Balcer	2019–2024	103	6	26	135
4	(United States) Megan Rapinoe	2013–2023	115	11	6	132
5	(United States) Bev Yanez	2014–2019	123	6	0	129
6	(United States) **Sofia Huerta**	Since 2020	91	6	24	121
7	(United States) Kristen McNabb	2017–2021	74	2	11	87
7	(United States) Keelin Winters	2013–2016	83	4	0	87
9	(United States) Tziarra King	2021–2024	67	1	17	85
9	(Canada) Quinn	2019–2024	65	5	15	85

==== Top scorers ====
#	Player	Tenure	NWSL	Playoffs	Other cups	Total
1	(United States) Megan Rapinoe	2013–2023	52	3	0	55
2	(Wales) **Jess Fishlock**	Since 2013	52	0	1	53
3	(United States) Bethany Balcer	2019–2024	33	0	6	39
4	(Scotland) Kim Little	2014–2016, 2022	32	1	0	33
5	(United States) Bev Yanez	2014–2019	24	1	0	25
6	(Japan) Nahomi Kawasumi	2014, 2016–2018	18	0	0	18
7	(Canada) **Jordyn Huitema**	2022-2025	13	0	2	15
8	(England) Jodie Taylor	2018–2020	14	0	0	14
9	(United States) **Sofia Huerta**	Since 2020	9	0	3	12
10	(United States) Maddie Mercado	Since 2024	11	0	0	11
10	(United States) Veronica Latsko	2022–2025	8	2	1	11

== See also ==
- History of professional soccer in Seattle
- List of top-division football clubs in CONCACAF countries
- List of professional sports teams in the United States and Canada
