= Girls Academy =

- Founded: 2020
- Country: United States
- Confederation: CONCACAF
- Number of clubs: 120 (2025-26 Season)
- Current champions: City SC White (U13); City SC White (U14); NEFC Red (U15); Galaxy SC (U16); Tophat Gold (U17); Tophat Gold (U19)
- Website: girlsacademyleague.com

Girls Academy (GA) is a soccer league and development platform for female soccer players in the United States. Formed in 2020, the league features youth academies and youth clubs from various organizations, including National Women's Soccer League.

== Competition format ==
Girls Academy features age groups starting at U-13 through U-19. During the regular season, teams play other members from their respective conferences. The league includes ten conferences (Northwest, Pacific Northwest, Frontier, Mid-America, Northeast, Mid-Atlantic, Midwest, Mountain West, Southeast, and Southwest). Top teams from each conference will participate in Playoffs, and National Finals for qualifying teams based on playoff performance. Non-playoff teams will also participate in a season-ending showcase.

Different age groups will also have a varying number of national events throughout the year to provide additional talent showcase opportunities in front of college and professional scouts.

=== Champions League ===
Two members of each conference are selected for Champions League, a separate competition for the most competitive clubs in Girls Academy. Participants qualify based on final league standings. For the U14 through U19 age groups, the highest-ranked wildcard teams at the National Playoff from each age group are added to the mix for a total of 20 teams per age group.

==== GA Aspire ====
GA Aspire is a second-tier league providing a regional competition platform for the secondary teams of Tier 1 Girls Academy member clubs, while also functioning as a performance-based promotion pathway for external clubs seeking entry into the top division. Competitors advance through localized regional conference play to qualify for national showcases and the annual Aspire National Playoffs.

=== National events ===
Girls Academy hosts five national events each season — Winter Showcase, Champions Cup, Spring Showcase, Summer Showcase, and National Playoffs, plus two U13/U14 events: East and West regionals.

== History ==
Citing the financial impact of the coronavirus pandemic, the U.S. Soccer Federation announced it was ending the U.S. Soccer Development Academy, leaving top boys and girls clubs to look for a new home. Former Development Academy clubs had a few options, many choosing to move to the Girls Academy, founded by a group of leaders from the Development Player League (DPL).

Former University of Washington women's soccer coach Lesle Gallimore served as its founding commissioner of the Girls Academy. She accepted the position in the summer of 2020, after the conclusion of her 26-year tenure as head coach of the women's soccer team at the University of Washington.

In October 2020, Girls Academy announced a strategic relationship with Major League Soccer and a partnership with USYS. According to the press release, Girls Academy will work in coordination with MLS Next, to “deliver a true pyramid for female youth players in the US, with the GA serving as the USYS premier girls platform in conjunction with MLS.” The partnership will focus on establishing academy standards for coaching and player development, improving talent identification partnerships, enhancing coaching education, and creating competitions to showcase players. While GA will maintain full autonomy over its league, they will also benefit from advice from the leaders of MLS and USYS as it aims to become the premier league for elite female soccer players in the United States.

In June 2023, Lesle Gallimore announced her resignation as Girls Academy commissioner to become General Manager of NWSL club OL Reign. Gallimore was succeeded by Patricia Hughes in September 2023.

On February 10, 2024, U.S. Soccer approved Girls Academy as a National Affiliate member.

In February 2025, the organization expanded its competitive pyramid by introducing GA Aspire as its official tier-two division, positioned directly between the first-tier Girls Academy and the third-tier Development Player League (DPL). In July 2026, the Girls Academy and the DPL executed a formal alignment agreement. Under this partnership, the DPL assumed day-to-day operational leadership and logistics management for the GA Aspire tier, while the DPL league itself was officially brought under the Girls Academy national sanctioning umbrella, establishing a unified, multi-tiered promotion and relegation pathway.

== League Champions ==
National Titles by Club
Team	U-13	U-14	U-15	U-16	U-17	U-19	No. of Wins
Tophat Gold	2023 2024		2023 2025		2026	2026	6
Nationals †		2022 2024			2021		3
Bay Area Surf †						2021 2022	2
Chicago FC United	2025		2024				2
Cincinnati United		2021		2021			2
City SC	2026	2026					2
Galaxy SC				2026	2025		2
Lou Fusz Athletic				2023 2024			2
TSJ FC Virginia			2022		2023		2
Albion SC				2022			1
Colorado Rush †	2022						1
Indy Premier		2025					1
Lonestar †					2024		1
NEFC			2021 2026				1
Oakwood SC					2022		1
Oklahoma Energy FC †	2021						1
SC del Sol						2024	1
Sockers FC Chicago						2023	1
South Shore Select †		2023					1
Syracuse DA				2025			1
Wasatch SC						2025	1
† Former member club

=== Champions Cup ===
	U-13	U-14	U-15	U-16	U-17	U-19	Club
2022	South Shore Select	Nationals Blue	Cincinnati United	Colorado Rush	Florida United	Bay Area Surf	Nationals
2023	Tophat Gold	Cincinnati United	Nationals Blue	Cincinnati United	Albion SC San Diego	Florida United	Tophat
2024	City SC	Nationals Blue	City SC	Nationals Blue	Cincinnati United	South Shore Select	Nationals
2025	Cincinnati United	Lou Fusz	Tophat Gold	Tophat Gold	STA	HTX	City SC
2026	Michigan Jaguars	Lamorinda SC	Lou Fusz Athletic	City SC White	TopHat Gold	TopHat Gold	Indy Premier

== College athletics ==
For the 2022-23 season, nearly 600 Girls Academy committed to play college soccer. 62.8% committed to Division I, 19.6% Division II, 13.4% Division III, and 2.6% NAIA. This was an increase over the 2021-22 season, which had 551 commitments.

== Notable professional players ==
As of April 2024

Player	GA Club	Pro Club	Notes
Chloe Ricketts	Michigan Jaguars	Washington Spirit	On March 2, 2023, Ricketts signed a three-year deal (with an option for a fourth year) with the team at the age of 15 years and 283 days. The contract made her the youngest ever NWSL signee at the time, breaking the record set by Olivia Moultrie in 2021 (15 years and 286 days).
Kimmi Ascanio	Florida United	San Diego Wave	In March 2024, San Diego Wave FC signed midfielder Kimmi Ascanio to a three-year contract through the 2026 season.
