= Emily Mason (soccer) =

American soccer player (born 2002)

- Mason with the Seattle Reign in 2026

Personal information
- Full name: Emily Morgan Mason
- Date of birth: October 23, 2002 (age 24)
- Height: 5 ft 10 in (1.78 m)
- Position: Defender

Team information
- Current team: Seattle Reign
- Number: 14

Youth career
- 2018–2020: Hunterdon Central Red Devils

College career
| Years | Team | Apps | (Gls) |
| 2021–2024 | Rutgers Scarlet Knights | 82 | (6) |

Senior career*
| Years | Team | Apps | (Gls) |
| 2025– | Seattle Reign | 27 | (0) |

International career^{‡}
| 2019–2022 | United States U-20 | 18 | (3) |
| 2025– | United States U-23 | 2 | (0) |
- * Club domestic league appearances and goals as of 16:35, November 8, 2026 (UTC) ‡ National team caps and goals as of June 2, 2025

Emily Morgan Mason (born October 23, 2002) is an American professional soccer player who plays as a defender for Seattle Reign FC of the National Women's Soccer League (NWSL). She played college soccer for the Rutgers Scarlet Knights, earning third-team All-American honors in 2022. She played high school soccer for Hunterdon Central Regional High School in Flemington, New Jersey, and was named the Gatorade National Player of the Year in 2020.

== Early life ==
Raised in Flemington, New Jersey, Mason played prep soccer at Hunterdon Central Regional High School. In her junior season, she was named the Gatorade National Player of the Year for 2020, having led Hunterdon Central to the Group IV state championship. She also received two All-American honors, NJGSCA Player of the Year, and two New Jersey Gatorade Player of the Year awards. She was ranked by TopDrawerSoccer as the third-best recruit of the 2021 class.

== College career ==
Mason appeared in all 25 games (18 starts) and provided 4 assists in her freshman season with the Rutgers Scarlet Knights in 2021. Rutgers went 10–0 in Big Ten Conference play to claim the program's first conference regular-season title, and they did not concede in the Big Ten tournament until losing 1–0 to Michigan in the final. In the NCAA tournament, she started all five games as the No. 1 seed Scarlet Knights reached their second-ever national semifinal, where they fell 1–0 to eventual champions No. 1 Florida State.

Mason scored a career-high 3 goals in 16 starts at center back in her sophomore season in 2022. Though she missed the end of the year with injury, she was named first-team All-Big Ten and third-team All-American by United Soccer Coaches. In her junior season in 2023, she scored 1 goal in 20 games (17 starts) and played every minute of the conference schedule, earning second-team All-Big Ten honors. She had 2 goals and 2 assists in 21 games in her senior season in 2024, and led the team in minutes played, earning first-team All-Big ten honors. In the Big Ten tournament, she assisted in a 1–1 draw against USC and made her penalty in a shootout win to advance to the final, where they lost to UCLA.

== Club career ==
Seattle Reign FC announced on January 8, 2025, that they had signed Mason to her first professional contract on a one-year deal. She was the club's first college signing after the abolition of the NWSL Draft. She made her professional debut on March 22, starting at right back in a 2–1 road win over the North Carolina Courage. She played across the back line primarily as a substitute during her rookie season. On August 27, she signed a one-year contract extension with the mutual option for another year.

== International career ==
Mason was called up to the United States youth national team at the under-14, under-16, under-18, and under-20 levels. She made 4 starts for the United States at the 2020 CONCACAF Women's U-20 Championship, including the final 4–1 victory over Mexico. She appeared in all 7 games (5 starts) at the 2022 CONCACAF Women's U-20 Championship, scoring 3 goals during the tournament and this time shutting out Mexico in the final, 2–0. She appeared in all 3 games (2 starts) for the United States 2022 FIFA U-20 Women's World Cup, where they did not make it out of the group stage. She was called up by Emma Hayes into Futures Camp, practicing concurrently with the senior national team, in January 2025.

== Career statistics ==
As of November 8, 2025

Appearances and goals by club, season and competition
| Club | Season | League | | | Cup (Note: Includes the NWSL Challenge Cup) | | Playoffs (Note: Includes NWSL Playoffs.) | | Total | |
| Club | Season | Division | Apps | Goals | Apps | Goals | Apps | Goals | Apps | Goals |
|---|---|---|---|---|---|---|---|---|---|---|
| Seattle Reign FC | 2025 | NWSL | 12 | 0 | — | | — | | 12 | 0 |
| Career total | | | 12 | 0 | 0 | 0 | 0 | 0 | 5 | 0 |

== Honors and awards ==
Rutgers Scarlet Knights

- Big Ten Conference: 2021

United States U-20

- CONCACAF Women's U-20 Championship: 2022
- Sud Ladies Cup: 2022

Individual

- Third-team All-American: 2022
- First-team All-Big Ten: 2022, 2024
- Second-team All-Big Ten: 2023
- Gatorade National Player of the Year: 2020
