= Lesle Gallimore =

American soccer player-coach

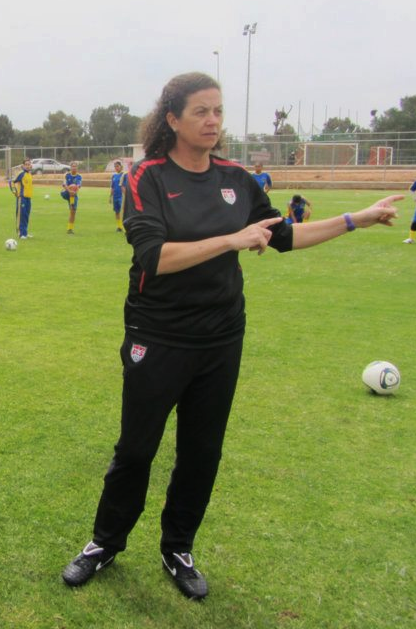
- Gallimore coaching in Morocco in May 2012

Biographical details
- Born: October 17, 1963 (age 63); Los Angeles, California

Playing career
- 1982–1985: California
- Position: Defender

Coaching career (HC unless noted)
- 1986–1989: California (assistant)
- 1990–1993: San Diego State
- 1994–2019: Washington

Administrative career (AD unless noted)
- 2020–2023: Girls Academy (commissioner)
- 2023–: Seattle Reign FC (general manager)

Accomplishments and honors

Championships
- Pac-10 (2000)

Awards
- NSCAA National Coach of the Year (2000); Soccer Buzz National Coach of the Year (2000); NSCAA West Region Coach of the Year (1994, 2000); Pac-12/Pac-10 Coach of the Year (2000, 2019); Washington Youth Soccer Hall of Fame Inductee (2019); NSCAA Women's Committee Award of Excellence (2012)

Records
- Most wins in Washington history (270)

Lesle D. Gallimore (born October 17, 1963) is an American sports administrator and former soccer coach who is currently the general manager of Seattle Reign FC of the National Women's Soccer League (NWSL). From 2020 to 2023, Gallimore was the inaugural commissioner of the Girls Academy League.

As a coach, Gallimore coached the women's soccer program at the University of Washington and retired as the winningest coach in program history. Her career victories rank in the top 25 in Division I women's soccer history.

Gallimore participated in 21 NCAA Tournaments, including three as a player at California (1983, 1984, 1986), three as an assistant coach at California (1986–1988) and 15 as the head coach at Washington (1994–1996, 1998, 2000–2001, 2003–2004, 2008–2010, 2012, 2014–2015, 2019).

== Early life ==
Gallimore grew up in Redondo Beach, California and attended South Torrance High School.

Gallimore was a four-time All-American defender at the University of California, Berkeley from 1982–1985 and helped lead the Golden Bears to the national playoffs three out of her four seasons. She earned second-team All-America honors in 1983 and 1985.

For her success as a player, Gallimore was named California's 1976–86 Athlete of the Decade. In 2015, she was named to the Pac-12 Women's Soccer All-Century Team.

== Coaching career ==
=== University of California, Berkeley ===
After graduating, Gallimore served as an assistant coach at California from 1986 through 1989.

=== San Diego State University ===
From 1990–1993, Gallimore was the head coach at San Diego State University ending her tenure with a 32–25–9 (.553) record. While at SDSU she also won the National Amateur tournament as a player and captained the West to the Olympic Festival gold medal in 1993.

Under Gallimore's leadership, the Aztecs women's soccer program steadily gained prominence. San Diego State had just two games against Division I opponents prior to Gallimore's arrival in 1990, but by her second season they had a 9–6–3 record that included 12 Division I teams and five Top 20 opponents.

=== University of Washington ===
Gallimore was hired as Washington's second head coach in February 1994, replacing the program's inaugural coach, Dang Pibulvech. Her first team broke the existing school records for most goals scored, fewest goals allowed and most shutouts. It was also the first appearance for the Huskies at the NCAA Tournament, advancing to the regional semifinal, but losing to the Stanford Cardinal, 6–5, on penalty kicks.

On January 15, 2019, Gallimore announced that she would retire from collegiate coaching after the 2019 season, her 26th year at Washington. She led the team back to the NCAA Tournament and was named the 2019 Pac-12 Coach of the Year.

Gallimore finished her career at Washington with a 270-218-49 overall record.

=== United States women's national team staff ===
In March 2001, Gallimore served as assistant coach to April Heinrichs for the U.S. Women's National Team at the Algarve Cup in Portugal.

=== Sports envoy ===
In April 2012, Gallimore traveled to Morocco with former United States women's national soccer team members Angela Hucles and Marian Dalmy on behalf of the United States State Department working for the Empowering Women and Girls through Sports Initiative. The group led soccer clinics and leadership training sessions for 104 young Moroccan female coaches as well as female coaches from Tunisia and Libya.

== Administrative career ==
=== Girls Academy ===
In June 2020, Gallimore was appointed the first-ever Commissioner of the Girls Academy league. The league was formed as a replacement for the now-defunct U.S. Soccer Development Academy.

== Honors ==
Gallimore was named the University of California's Athlete of the Decade for 1976–86 and was inducted into the Cal Hall of Fame in 1995.

She was named Pac-10 Coach of the Year in 2000 and voted the 2000 National Coach of the Year in a poll of coaches conducted by Soccer Buzz.

Gallimore was twice named NSCAA West Region Coach of the Year, in 1994 and 2000.

Gallimore was named 2019 Pac-12 Coach of the Year.

== See also ==
- Washington Huskies women's soccer
- Girls Academy
