= Jordyn Bugg =

American soccer player (born 2006)

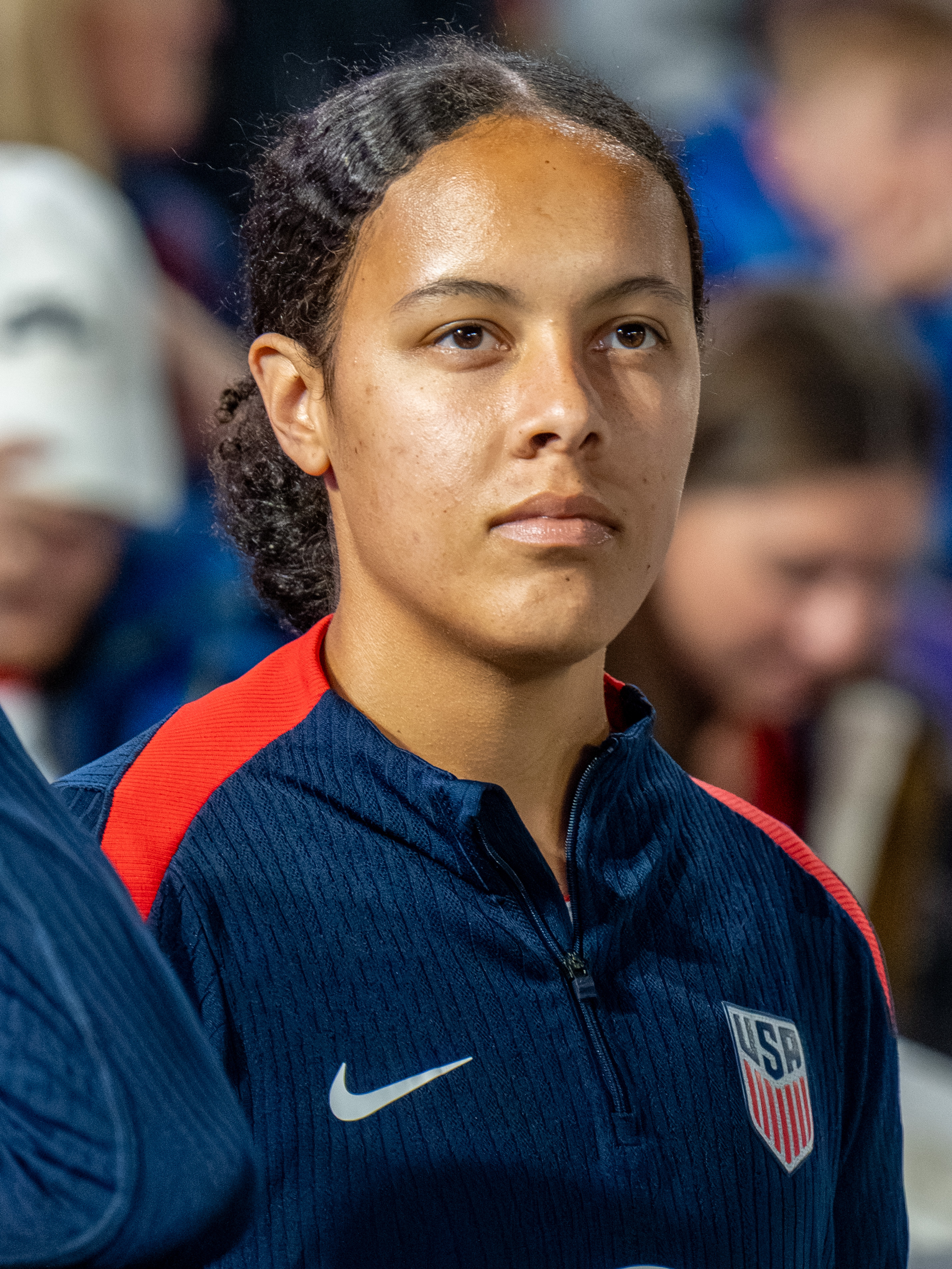
- Bugg with the United States in 2025

Personal information
- Full name: Jordyn Nishai Bugg
- Date of birth: August 11, 2006 (age 20)
- Height: 5 ft 7 in (1.70 m)
- Position: Center back

Team information
- Current team: Seattle Reign FC
- Number: 23

Youth career
- San Diego Surf

Senior career*
Years	Team	Apps	(Gls)
2024–	Seattle Reign FC	53	(5)

International career^{‡}
2022	United States U-16		
2022	United States U-17	4	(0)
2023	United States U-19	5	(0)
2024	United States U-20	11	(1)
2025–	United States U-23	2	(0)
2025–	United States	6	(0)
Medal record
Women's soccer
FIFA U-20 Women's World Cup
Bronze medal – third place	Colombia 2024
- * Club domestic league appearances and goals as of November 1, 2026 ‡ National team caps and goals as of January 27, 2026

Jordyn Nishai Bugg (born August 11, 2006) is an American professional soccer player who plays as a center back for Seattle Reign FC of the National Women's Soccer League (NWSL) and the United States national team. She signed with the Reign at age 17 in 2024 and earned NWSL Best XI Second Team honors in 2025. She won bronze medals as a youth international at the 2023 Pan American Games and the 2024 FIFA U-20 Women's World Cup.

== Early life ==
Bugg was raised in El Cajon, California, the oldest of five siblings. Her parents attended Eastern Kentucky University, where her father played college football and her mother played basketball. She is a cousin of NFL cornerback Terrion Arnold.

Bugg attended Christian Junior/Senior High School and played club soccer for San Diego Surf SC, winning the ECNL national championship in 2024. She trained with NWSL club San Diego Wave during her last two years of high school, developing under center backs Naomi Girma and Abby Dahlkemper and head coach Casey Stoney. She initially committed to play college soccer for the Stanford Cardinal in the class of 2025, before reclassifying and changing her commitment to the Florida State Seminoles. She was poised to be the top ranked member of Florida State's recruiting class of 2024.

== Club career ==
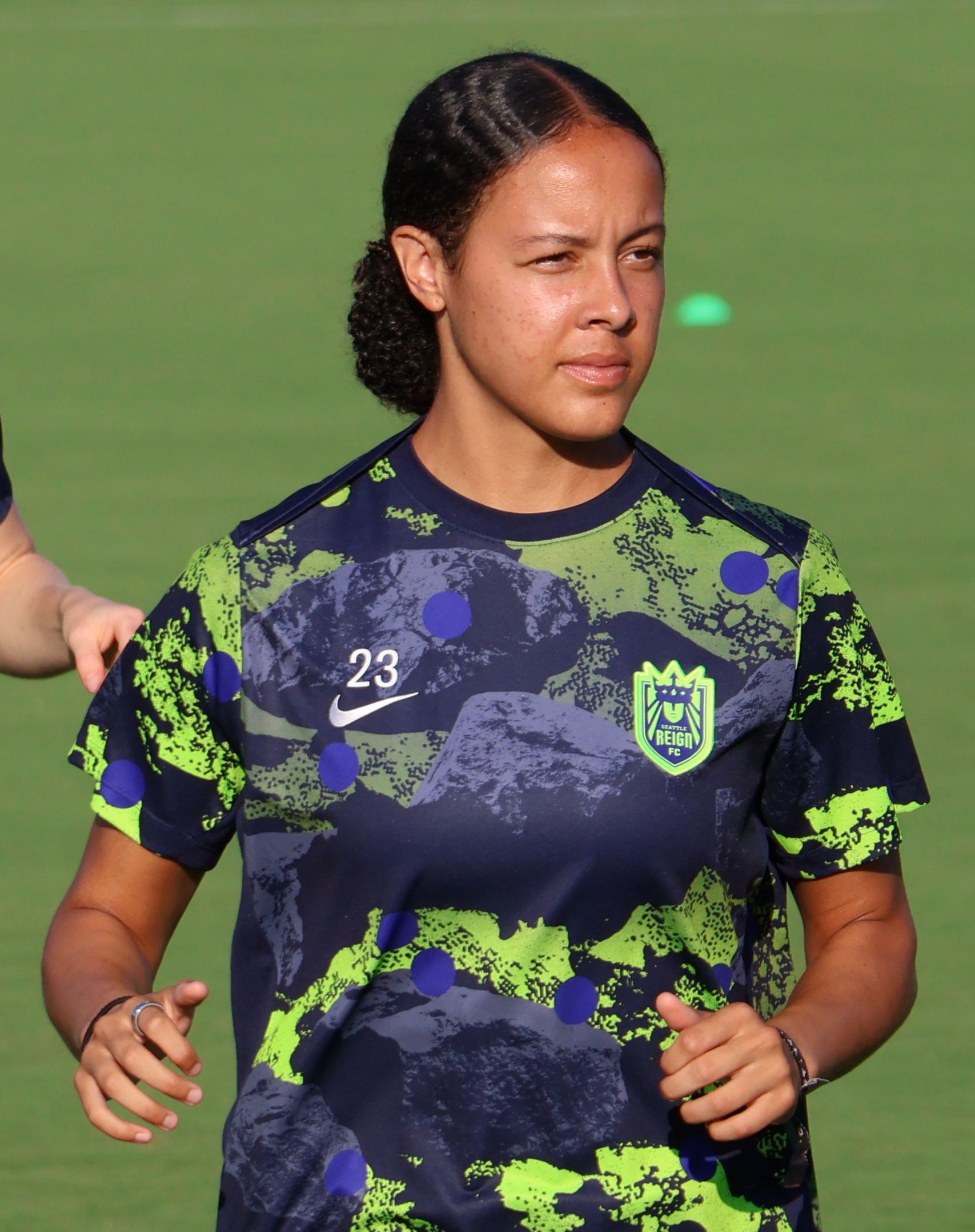
Bugg with the Reign in 2026

On July 19, 2024, Seattle Reign FC announced that the club had signed Bugg to her first professional contract on a two-and-a-half-year deal under the National Women's Soccer League (NWSL)'s Under-18 Entry Mechanism. She had begun training with the Reign the previous month, and decided to give up her college eligibility and sign following her previous experience with San Diego and the NWSL signings of several youth international teammates.

The following week, Bugg made her professional debut against Club Tijuana in the NWSL x Liga MX Femenil Summer Cup, playing both center back and full back in a 3–2 defeat. Her debut appearance triggered a clause in her contract that extended the deal by a year through 2027. Despite the loss, Seattle head coach Laura Harvey said her performance was "exceptional". After impressing in the Summer Cup, Bugg became an undisputed starter in central defense as a replacement for the outgoing Alana Cook, making her regular-season debut in a 1–0 home win over the North Carolina Courage on August 25.

Jordyn Bugg with the Seattle Reign in 2026

On March 22, 2025, Bugg scored her first professional goal in a 2–1 road win over the North Carolina Courage, settling a cleared ball and lacing it into the goal from distance. The goal was named NWSL Goal of the Week and nominated for the year's FIFA Marta Award. On June 14, she scored the last-minute 2–2 equalizer against the Chicago Stars, securing a point for Seattle from a two-goal deficit. She was named to the NWSL Team of the Month for March and June. She finished her first full season with 3 result-changing goals and 25 regular-season appearances with only center back partner Phoebe McClernon logging more field minutes for the Reign. She helped the club finish fifth and qualify for the playoffs, losing 2–0 to the Orlando Pride in the quarterfinals. She was one of five nominees for NWSL Defender of the Year, which went to Tara McKeown, and was named to the NWSL Best XI Second Team.

On May 15, 2026, after missing the start of the season due to injury, Bugg made her first appearance of the year in a 2–0 defeat to Gotham FC. On October 1, she signed a three-year contract extension with the Reign, committing her future with the club through 2030. The next day, she made her 50th career regular-season appearance, becoming the NWSL's youngest defender to reach the milestone. On November 1, she scored the only goal in the season finale against the Orlando Pride, clinching a playoff berth for Seattle.

== International career ==
Bugg played in friendlies for the United States national under-16 team in 2022. She joined the under-17 team as a replacement for an injured player at the 2022 FIFA U-17 Women's World Cup in India, where she appeared in three games. She was the only player on the United States under-19 team to start all five games at the 2023 Pan American Games, where she won bronze playing against other countries' senior teams. She trained with the under-20 team the following year and was selected to the roster for the 2024 FIFA U-20 Women's World Cup. She played all but four minutes at the U-20 Women's World Cup, helping the United States finish in third place, the country's best result since 2012.

Bugg was called up by Emma Hayes into Futures Camp, practicing alongside the senior national team, in January 2025. In May, she assisted Evelyn Shores's game winner with a long cross against the Germany under-23s.

Hayes gave Bugg her first senior national team call-up in June 2025. She made her senior debut as a 73rd-minute substitute for Naomi Girma during a 4–0 friendly win against the Republic of Ireland.

== Style of play ==
Bugg plays primarily as a center back but can also play as a fullback. She moved to the back line from midfield in high school. She cites center back Naomi Girma, who mentored her in San Diego, as her "main inspiration". Seattle general manager Lesle Gallimore said of her: "She is athletic, technically clean and has a good football IQ".

== Career statistics ==
=== International ===
As of match played January 27, 2026

National Team	Year	Apps	Goals
United States	2025	5	0
United States	2026	1	0
Total		6	0

== Honors and awards ==
United States U-19

- Pan American Games bronze medal: 2023

United States U-20

- FIFA U-20 Women's World Cup bronze medal: 2024

Individual

- NWSL Best XI Second Team: 2025
