= Sofia Cedeño =

Panamanian-American soccer player (born 2006)

- Cedeño with the Seattle Reign in 2026

Personal information
- Full name: Ana Sofía Cedeño Briceno
- Date of birth: August 9, 2006 (age 20)
- Place of birth: Panama
- Height: 5 ft 1 in (1.55 m)
- Position: Midfielder

Team information
- Current team: Dallas Trinity (on loan from the Seattle Reign)
- Number: 32

Youth career
- Solar SC

Senior career*
Years	Team	Apps	(Gls)
2025	Seattle Reign	0	(0)
2025	Halifax Tides	11	(0)
2026–	Seattle Reign	1	(0)
2026–	→ Dallas Trinity (loan)	0	(0)

International career^{‡}
2025–	United States U-20	2	(0)
- * Club domestic league appearances and goals as of March 20, 2026 ‡ National team caps and goals as of December 2, 2025

Ana Sofía Cedeño Briceno (born August 9, 2006) is a professional soccer player who plays as a midfielder for USL Super League club Dallas Trinity, on loan from Seattle Reign FC. Born in Panama, she is a youth international for the United States.

== Early life ==
Born in Panama, Cedeño practiced gymnastics before deciding to focus on soccer at age ten. Her family moved to Texas when she was eleven. She briefly attended Westside High School in Houston before transferring to MacArthur High School in Irving, Texas, during her freshman year in 2021. She played high school soccer for three seasons at MacArthur, scoring 92 goals and adding 60 assists, before graduating early. She played club soccer for Solar SC, earning ECNL All-American honors in 2024. Before going pro, she was committed to play college soccer for the UCLA Bruins.

== Club career ==
Cedeño trained with the NWSL's Seattle Reign as a non-roster invitee in the 2025 preseason, joining her former Solar teammates Emeri Adames and Ainsley McCammon. She impressed at the Coachella Valley Invitational. On March 12, 2025, the Reign announced that they had signed Cedeño to a one-year contract and she would join USL Super League club Brooklyn FC on loan through June. However, later that month, she and the Reign mutually agreed to terminate her contract to explore other opportunities.

On August 9, 2025, Cedeño signed with Northern Super League club Halifax Tides. She made her professional debut one day later in a 0–0 draw with the Calgary Wild. She finished the inaugural NSL season with 11 appearances.

On December 8, 2025, Cedeño returned to the Seattle Reign, signing a three-year contract through 2028. She made her NWSL debut on March 20, 2026, as a second-half substitute for Nérilia Mondésir in a 2–0 loss to rivals Portland Thorns.

On On August 3, 2026, Cedeño was sent on loan to USL Super League club Dallas Trinity until the end of the year alongside Reign teammate Neeku Purcell.

== International career ==
Cedeño is eligible to represent Panama and the United States internationally. She was called into training camp with the United States under-19 team in October 2024. In February 2025, Panama head coach Toña Is said she wanted to call up Cedeño in the near future. In October 2025, she was called into training with the United States under-20 team.
