= Neeku Purcell =

American soccer player (born 2003)

- Purcell with the Seattle Reign in 2026

Personal information
- Full name: Neeku Kazemi Purcell
- Date of birth: October 7, 2003 (age 23)
- Place of birth: Seattle, Washington, U.S.
- Height: 5 ft 9 in (1.75 m)
- Position: Goalkeeper

Team information
- Current team: Dallas Trinity (on loan from the Seattle Reign)
- Number: 35

Youth career
- 2016–2022: OL Reign Academy

College career
Years	Team	Apps	(Gls)
2022–2023	UCLA Bruins	27	(0)

Senior career*
Years	Team	Apps	(Gls)
2024–2025	Brooklyn FC	17	(0)
2025–	Seattle Reign	0	(0)
2026–	→ Dallas Trinity (loan)	0	(0)

International career^{‡}
2018	United States U-16		
2019	United States U-17	3	(0)
2019	United States U-18	1	(0)
2022	United States U-20	7	(0)
2025–	United States U-23	2	(0)
- * Club domestic league appearances and goals as of May 10, 2025 ‡ National team caps and goals as of 14:07, March 8, 2026 (UTC)

Neeku Kazemi Purcell (born October 7, 2003) is an American professional soccer player who plays as a goalkeeper for USL Super League club Dallas Trinity, on loan from Seattle Reign FC. Born in Seattle, she played college soccer for the UCLA Bruins, winning the national championship as a backup in 2022. After one season as a starter at UCLA, she began her professional career with Brooklyn FC in 2024. She then signed with the Reign in 2025, becoming the first non-loan transfer from the USL Super League to the NWSL. She has represented the United States at the youth level, appearing at the 2022 FIFA U-20 Women's World Cup.

== Early life ==
Purcell was born and raised in Seattle, Washington, one of two twin sisters born to Elham Kazemi and Mark Purcell. Both of her parents went to UCLA. She attended the Spruce Street School then Northwest School, where she played basketball and lettered in three seasons. She played club soccer for the OL Reign Academy from its inception in 2016. She was rated by TopDrawerSoccer as the eighth-best player of the 2022 class, part of UCLA's second-ranked recruiting class.

== College career ==
Purcell made 8 appearances (all off the bench) for the UCLA Bruins in her freshman season in 2022, serving as the understudy to Lauren Brzykcy. She appeared briefly in the first round of the NCAA tournament but was unused in the rest of the competition as UCLA won its second national championship. In her sophomore season in 2023, she started all 19 games and kept 11 clean sheets (including 4 combined shutouts). UCLA won the Pac-12 Conference and earned a one seed in the NCAA tournament, where the team was upset by UC Irvine in the first round.

== Club career ==
=== Brooklyn FC ===
Brooklyn FC announced on August 6, 2024, that the club had signed Purcell ahead of the inaugural season of the USL Super League. She made her professional debut on September 29, keeping a clean sheet in a 1–0 win against Lexington SC. She eventually won the starting job over Sydney Martinez and finished the fall series with consecutive shutouts against Lexington on December 7 and Dallas Trinity on December 14. Brooklyn were leading in the standings at the winter break, but the club proved unable to continue its form and ended the season in sixth place. Purcell finished the season with 4 clean sheets in 17 appearances.

=== Seattle Reign ===
On June 3, 2025, Purcell joined hometown club Seattle Reign on a short-term goalkeeper replacement contract. The move was the first-ever non-loan transfer of a player from the USL Super League to the NWSL. She was unused as the third-stringer behind starter Claudia Dickey and backup Maddie Prohaska.

On December 8, 2025, Purcell signed a one-year contract extension with the Reign. With the departure of Prohaska, Purcell began her second season as Dickey's primary backup until veteran Cassie Miller returned from injury. On July 1, 2026, she signed a two-year contract extension with the Reign through 2028.

On August 3, 2026, Purcell returned to the USL Super League, joining the Dallas Trinity on loan until the end of the year alongside Reign teammate Sofia Cedeño.

== International career ==
Purcell was called up to the United States youth national team at the under-15, under-16, under-17, under-18, and under-20 levels. She started all four knockout rounds for the United States at the 2022 CONCACAF Women's U-20 Championship, conceding no goals as they won the tournament. She started the country's second game at the 2022 FIFA U-20 Women's World Cup, a 3–0 loss to the Netherlands, as the United States did not make it out of the group stage. She was called up by Emma Hayes into Futures Camp, practicing alongside the senior national team, in January 2025. She was the only USL Super League player called into the camp.

== Honors and awards ==
UCLA Bruins

- NCAA Division I women's soccer tournament: 2022
- Pac-12 Conference: 2023

United States U-20

- CONCACAF Women's U-20 Championship: 2022
