= Maddie Dahlien =

American soccer player (born 2004)

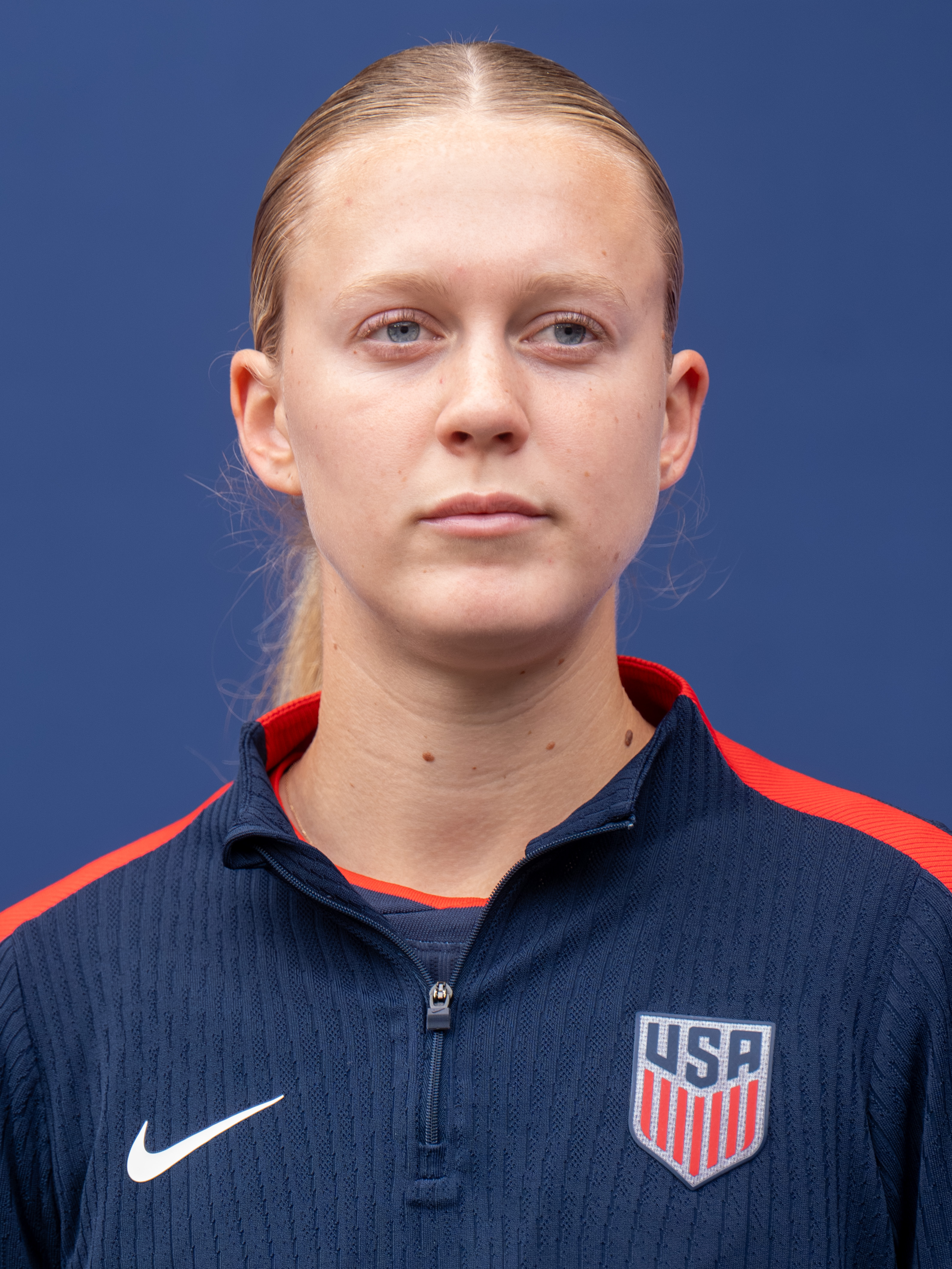
- Dahlien with the United States in 2026

Personal information
- Full name: Madeline Grace Dahlien
- Date of birth: July 25, 2004 (age 22)
- Height: 5 ft 9 in (1.75 m)
- Positions: Left winger; wingback

Team information
- Current team: Seattle Reign
- Number: 5

College career
| Years | Team | Apps | (Gls) |
| 2022–2024 | North Carolina Tar Heels | 65 | (7) |

Senior career*
| Years | Team | Apps | (Gls) |
| 2025– | Seattle Reign | 51 | (7) |

International career^{‡}
| 2023–2024 | United States U-20 | 15 | (6) |
| 2025– | United States U-23 | 4 | (1) |
| 2026– | United States | 3 | (0) |
Medal record
Women's soccer
FIFA U-20 Women's World Cup
| Bronze medal – third place | Colombia 2024 |
- * Club domestic league appearances and goals as of 16:32, November 8, 2026 (UTC) ‡ National team caps and goals as of March 1, 2026

Madeline Grace Dahlien (/dɑːˈliːn/, born July 25, 2004) is an American professional soccer player who plays as a left winger or wingback for Seattle Reign FC of the National Women's Soccer League (NWSL) and the United States national team. She played college soccer for the North Carolina Tar Heels, winning the 2024 national championship. She won bronze with the United States at the 2024 FIFA U-20 Women's World Cup.

== Early life ==
Dahlien was raised in Edina, Minnesota. She played for Edina Soccer Club before high school, when she joined Minnesota Thunder Academy, the state's only team in the Elite Clubs National League, and was named All-American in 2021. She attended Edina High School, where she recorded 92 career goals and 43 assists and was named all-state three times. She scored 37 goals in her senior year in 2021, helping lead her team to the state semifinals.

Dahlien also starred in track and field in high school, coming second at the state championship in the 100, 200, and 400 meters as a freshman; sweeping the 100, 200, and 400 meters as a junior; and winning the 200 meters and long jump as a senior, narrowly coming second in the 100 and 400 meters. Following her senior year, she was named the Star Tribune Female Athlete of the Year. She committed to the University of North Carolina for soccer as a junior but considered additionally trying to join the track team.

== College career ==
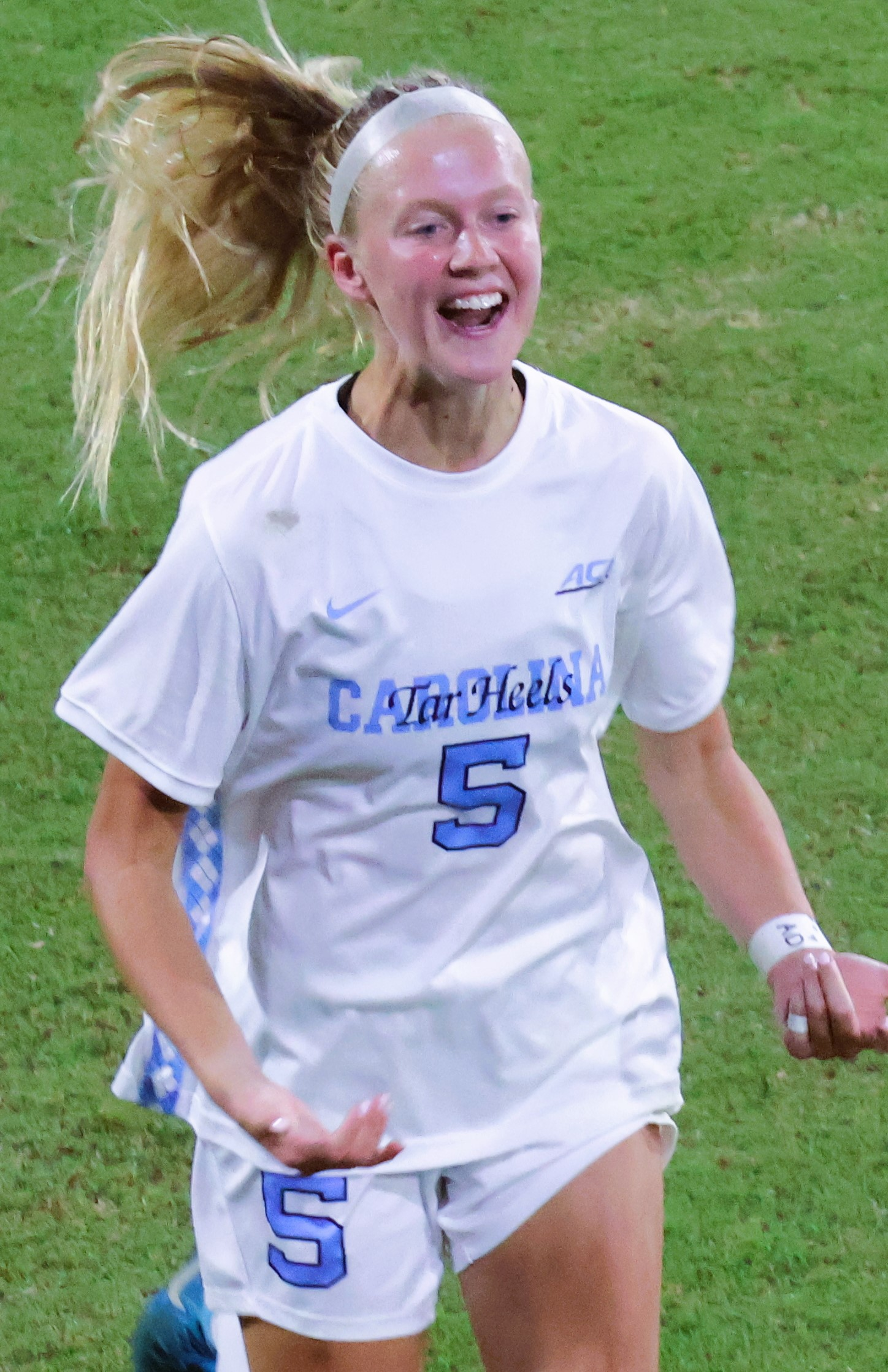
Dahlien with North Carolina in 2024

Dahlien played in all 26 games, starting 5, and scored 4 goals with 3 assists for the North Carolina Tar Heels as a freshman in 2022, earning a place on the Atlantic Coast Conference (ACC) all-freshman team. In the NCAA tournament, she scored twice against BYU as the Tar Heels reached the final, losing to UCLA. She played in 21 games, making 5 starts, and scored 1 goal with 7 assists as a sophomore in 2023.

Dahlien became a regular starter in her junior year in 2024, earning third-team All-ACC honors, though she missed about a month while at the 2024 FIFA U-20 Women's World Cup. She played in 18 games and scored 2 goals while leading the team with 7 assists and drawing a whopping 6 penalty kicks. In the NCAA tournament semifinals, she drew the penalty for the opening goal and scored the third goal in a 3–0 win against Duke. North Carolina won 1–0 against Wake Forest in the final, securing the program's 23rd national title and first since 2012.

== Club career ==
Seattle Reign FC announced on January 8, 2025, that the club had signed Dahlien to her first professional contract on a three-year deal. She made her professional debut starting in a season-opening 1–1 draw against Gotham FC. On April 18, she scored her first professional goal less than four minutes into the game against the Portland Thorns, which stood as the difference in a 1–0 win. She was the second-youngest player to score in a Cascadia rivalry game after Portland's Olivia Moultrie. Head coach Laura Harvey deployed Dahlien at both left winger and left wingback over the course of the season. She finished her rookie season with 4 goals and 4 assists in 26 games, helping the Reign place fifth in the standings. In the playoffs, she came on as a second-half substitute in a 2–0 loss to the Orlando Pride in the quarterfinals. She was one of three nominees for NWSL Rookie of the Year, losing to Lilly Reale.

On October 17, 2026, the Reign confirmed that Dahlien had torn her anterior cruciate ligament (ACL) during under-23 training camp. She ended the season with 3 goals and 4 assists in 25 games.

== International career ==
Dahlien first trained with the United States youth national team at a combined under-18/under-19 camp in April 2023. She was one of the youngest players selected to the under-20 roster for 2023 CONCACAF Women's U-20 Championship, scoring a hat trick in her international debut against Jamaica in the group stage. She entered the starting lineup as the team finished as runners-up to Mexico, securing qualification to the 2024 FIFA U-20 Women's World Cup.

Dahlien appeared off the bench in every game at the 2024 FIFA U-20 Women's World Cup. She scored in both of the team's group stage wins over Morocco and Paraguay. In the quarterfinals, trailing Germany 2–0, the United States came back in the last moments of regulation with a goal from Jordynn Dudley and an own goal forced by Ally Sentnor in the 90+8th and 90+9th minutes—the latter off Dahlien's deflected cross; they advanced in a penalty shootout. Following a semifinal defeat to eventual champions North Korea, Dahlien forced a 119th-minute own goal in a 2–1 extra-time win over the Netherlands, helping the United States finish the tournament in third place, its best result since 2012. She was called up by Emma Hayes into Futures Camp, practicing concurrently with the senior national team, in January 2025.

Dahlien was called up to the senior national team for the first time in January 2026. She made her USWNT debut alongside Reign teammate Sally Menti as a 63th-minute substitute in a 6–0 friendly win against Paraguay on January 24.

== Career statistics ==
=== International ===
As of match played March 1, 2026

| National Team | Year | Apps | Goals |
|---|---|---|---|
| United States | 2026 | 3 | 0 |
| Total | | 3 | 0 |

== Honors ==
North Carolina Tar Heels

- NCAA Division I women's soccer tournament: 2024

United States

- SheBelieves Cup: 2026

United States U-20

- FIFA U-20 Women's World Cup bronze medal: 2024

Individual

- Third-team All-ACC: 2024
- ACC all-freshman team: 2022
- ACC tournament all-tournament team: 2024
