= Sally Menti =

American soccer player (born 2002)

- Menti with the Seattle Reign in 2026

Personal information
- Full name: Sally Marie Menti
- Date of birth: March 10, 2002 (age 24)
- Height: 5 ft 8 in (1.73 m)
- Position: Midfielder

Team information
- Current team: Seattle Reign
- Number: 17

College career
Years	Team	Apps	(Gls)
2020–2024	Santa Clara Broncos	74	(11)

Senior career*
Years	Team	Apps	(Gls)
2025–	Seattle Reign	43	(3)

International career^{‡}
2019–2020	United States U-18	3	(0)
2019–2022	United States U-20	5	(0)
2026–	United States	1	(0)
- * Club domestic league appearances and goals as of 16:36, November 8, 2026 (UTC) ‡ National team caps and goals as of January 24, 2026

Menti with the Seattle Reign in 2026

Sally Marie Menti (born March 10, 2002) is an American professional soccer player who plays as a midfielder for Seattle Reign FC of the National Women's Soccer League (NWSL) and the United States national team. She played college soccer for the Santa Clara Broncos, winning the 2020 national championship.

== Early life ==
Menti grew up in Seattle, Washington, and attended the Seattle Academy and Roosevelt High School. She played ECNL club soccer for Crossfire Premier. She initially committed to Gonzaga as a freshman, before changing her commitment to Santa Clara one year later.

== College career ==
Menti appeared in all 12 games for the Santa Clara Broncos as a freshman in 2020, a shortened season due to the COVID-19 pandemic, and scored 2 goals with a team-high 6 assists. In the NCAA tournament (which was held in the spring), she scored the winner against Clemson in the quarterfinals and put away her penalty in an upset shootout victory over Florida State in the final. She was named the West Coast Conference (WCC) Freshman of the Year, second-team All-WCC, and Best XI Freshman by TopDrawerSoccer.

In her sophomore season in 2021, Menti had 1 goal and 2 assists in 21 games. She helped Santa Clara return to the NCAA tournament semifinals, where she made her penalty in their shootout loss to BYU. She missed the entire following season due to an ACL tear. In her redshirt junior year in 2023, she scored 4 goals and led the team with 9 assists in 21 games, earning first-team All-WCC honors. She scored the winner in the NCAA tournament first round before losing in the second round. She started all 20 games and scored 4 goals with a team-high 7 assists in her redshirt senior year in 2024, earning first-team All-WCC honors, but again the team fell in the NCAA tournament second round.

== Club career ==
Menti joined hometown club Seattle Reign FC as a non-roster trialist in the 2025 preseason. She was unable to attend preseason as she nursed an injury but had previously trained with the club over the years. On March 25, the Reign announced that they had signed Menti to her first professional contract on a short-term deal through June. She made her professional debut on May 23, coming on as a late substitute in a 2–1 defeat to the Washington Spirit. On June 6, in her next appearance and first start, she scored her first professional goal from long range against the San Diego Wave, opening a 2–1 victory. Soon later, on June 25, she signed a two-and-a-half-year contract extension through 2027, with the mutual option for another year. She played in 15 regular-season games as a rookie, starting 10, and scored 1 goal as the Reign placed fifth in the league. In the playoffs, she came on as a substitute in the 2–0 loss to the Orlando Pride in the semifinals.

== International career ==
Menti trained with the United States youth national team at the under-16, under-17, under-18, and under-20 levels. However, her time with the under-20 team was disrupted by injury. She came off the bench in the opening game against Nicaragua at the 2022 CONCACAF Women's U-20 Championship but broke her wrist at the end of the game and missed the rest of the tournament. She tore her ACL later that year while training for the 2022 FIFA U-20 Women's World Cup and was replaced on the roster by her college teammate Annie Karich. She was called into training camp with the United States under-23 team, practicing concurrently with the senior national team, in March 2025.

Emma Hayes called up Menti to the senior national team for the first time in January 2026. She made her USWNT debut alongside Reign teammate Maddie Dahlien as a 63th-minute substitute in a 6–0 friendly win against Paraguay on January 24.

== Career statistics ==
=== International ===
As of match played January 24, 2026

National Team	Year	Apps	Goals
United States	2026	1	0
Total		1	0

== Honors and awards ==
Santa Clara Broncos

- NCAA Division I women's soccer tournament: 2020

United States U-20

- CONCACAF Women's U-20 Championship: 2022

Individual

- First-team All-WCC:2023, 2024
- Second-team All-WCC: 2020
- WCC Freshman of the Year: 2020
