= U.S. Soccer Development Academy =

Soccer league

- Founded: 2007
- Folded: 2020
- Replaced by: MLS Next and Girls Academy
- Country: United States
- Other club from: Canada
- Confederation: CONCACAF
- Conferences: 3
- Number of clubs: 200 (including girls academy)
- Last champions: New York City FC (U18/19); Seattle Sounders FC (U16/17)
- Website: www.ussoccerda.com

The U.S. Soccer Development Academy (DA) was an American soccer league. Formed in 2007, the league featured youth academies and youth clubs from various organizations, including Major League Soccer and the United Soccer League. The DA's mission was to provide education, resources, and support to impact everyday club environments in order to develop world-class players.

As of the 2016–17 season, the Academy had 149 total clubs, in five age groups: U-12, U-13, U-14, U-15/16, and U-17/18. The Academy was in the process of expanding their programming to include a Girls' Development Academy that consisted of 74 clubs and began in the fall of 2017.

On April 15, 2020, U.S. Soccer made the determination to end the operation of the Development Academy at the behest of MLS who wanted their Academies to be the only pathway for youth development and due to the financial situation created by the COVID-19 pandemic.

== Joining an Academy club ==
For players to join the Academy, they must first join one of the member clubs. The Academy suggests any interested player should contact the club directly for specific information about joining the club. Clubs can be found based on age group within the three regional conferences.

Clubs must apply directly to the Academy through the website. Applications for the boys' clubs are available in early fall on the Development Academy website. Accepted clubs join the Academy in the following fall season.

== History ==
The U.S. Soccer Development Academy was founded in 2007, after a comprehensive review of elite player development conducted by the USSF, to serve as the top tier for youth soccer in the United States and provide an elite everyday environment for player development. The organization was created as a partnership between U.S. Soccer and top level clubs across the country, emphasizing increased training with more competitive games versus more games in general, with the ultimate goal of producing world-class players.

The league serves to connect national team coaches at all age levels directly with elite youth players, while also serving as a venue for advanced coaching and referee development.

The league is unique among other professional soccer leagues domestically, as it runs on a winter-based schedule. The season generally begins in September and ends in June or July. There is usually a hiatus in January and February, and players have the summer off. Most of the clubs are associated with professional teams, either in North America through MLS, the NASL or the USL, or with European clubs. The professional teams cover most, if not all of the fees, while the academies offer a pipeline of talent to the professional club.

The league also welcomed two Canadian teams, the respective academy sides for the professional clubs of the Vancouver Whitecaps FC and the Montreal Impact of MLS with the third, Toronto FC, following in 2018.

The DA celebrated its 10th season, and recently unveiled a new logo. The logo features an inextricable link to the U.S. Soccer crest, and features the letters "DA", for Development Academy. The forward and upward motion of the logo's shape signifies the strategic growth and direction of the program. The four stripes represent the four pillars of the Development Academy: excellence, pride, tradition, and education.

=== Champs ===
DA Champions
Season	U18/19	U17/18	U16/17	U15/16
2007–2008	-	Baltimore Bays Chelsea	-	Carmel United SC
2008–2009	-	Carmel United SC	-	Derby County Wolves
2009–2010	-	Vardar SC Freiburg	-	Chicago Fire Academy
2010–2011	-	Pateadores Academy	-	Los Angeles Galaxy Academy
2011–2012	-	FC Dallas Development Academy	-	New York Red Bulls Academy
2012–2013	-	New York Red Bulls Academy	-	Real Salt Lake-Arizona Academy
2013–2014	-	Players Development Academy	-	Los Angeles Galaxy Academy
2014–2015	-	Chicago Fire Academy	-	FC Dallas Development Academy
2015–2016	-	FC Dallas Development Academy	-	FC Dallas Development Academy
2016–2017	-	Texans SC Houston	-	Atlanta United FC Academy
2017–2018	New York City FC Academy	-	Seattle Sounders FC Academy	-
2018–2019	New York City FC Academy	-	Solar Soccer Club	Toronto FC Academy

Original USSDA logo

== Growth and development ==
U.S. Soccer's new Player Development Initiatives (PDIs) are geared towards giving players the right tools to succeed and develop to the best of their abilities in age appropriate environments. More information about best practices, the Birth Year Mandate, and further resources can be found on the U.S. Soccer Player Development Initiatives homepage.

=== Coaching education ===
The Academy also offers U.S. Soccer coaching education resources and licenses through the Digital Coaching Center.

=== U-12 program ===
The Development Academy expanded to include the U-12 age group in the fall of 2016. The U-12 Academy program improves the training environment for players at younger ages by providing more and higher quality training, more meaningful yet fewer total games, and age-appropriate learning environments. The U-12 program was stopped at the end of the season 2018-2019.

=== U-13 and U-14 single age group ===
The Development Academy split the U-13/14 age group into single age groups to create foundation of the pathway at U-13 and U-14, to focus on individual player development. This will provide the base for a long-term streamlined pathway with flexibility to move players between rosters within the club, a better transition period for players from 9v9 to 11v11, and include late developers.

The U-13 Academy Program follows the same schedule as the current U-13/14 program, consisting of divisional play, futsal training, and a regional showcase event.

=== Girls' Development Academy ===
The Development Academy is pleased to announce that 74 clubs will join the Girls' Development Academy in the inaugural season of fall 2017. The Girls' Development Academy is part of U.S. Soccer's global leadership position in women's soccer and connects with its long-term plan to improve player and coach development. Initially the program will include three age groups, U-14/15, U-16/17 and U-18/19. The mission of the program is to provide education, resources and support to directly impact the everyday environment for clubs to develop world-class female players.

== Closure ==
On April 15, 2020, U.S. Soccer made the determination to end the operation of the Development Academy due to the financial situation created by the COVID-19 pandemic. The boys clubs transition to MLS Next, and girls clubs transitioned to Girls Academy (GA) or Elite Clubs National League (ECNL).

== Academy structure ==
The schedule of the Development Academy consists of a ten-month season which begins in September and finishes with championships in July. Clubs take a break in league play during the winter due to weather conditions, but most continue to train. During the season each academy team expects to play between 25 and 30 games. These games are typically within the clubs' respective divisions, with the exception of showcase and playoff games. The U-15/16 and U-17/18 teams participate in Summer and Winter Showcases. The Summer Showcase also acts as the group stage of Academy Playoffs. The teams that advance from the Academy playoffs can expect to play up to an additional three games.

The Development Academy designs the structure of the schedule for all clubs, and it is the clubs' responsibility to organize a time and location for each game.

Each age group has its own distinctive structure. The U-12 program has players practice more often, but play in fewer games. The U-13 and U-14 program attend showcases throughout the year and play in games. These showcases include the Fall Regional Showcase, Winter Futsal Showcase, and Summer National Showcase. The U-12 program, U-13 and U-14 programs do not participate in the playoffs.

The U-15/16 and U-17/18 age groups compete in two national showcases and regular season games. As mentioned above, the Summer and Winter Showcases are the premier events for these age groups. Additionally, 32 teams qualify for the playoffs and the top 8 go on to compete in the academy championships.

== Age groups ==
The Academy had 149 total clubs, in five age groups: U-12, U-13, U-14, U-15/16, and U-17/18. These 149 clubs were all located within seventeen geographically-based divisions at the U-12 age group, ten geographically-based divisions at the U-13 and U-14 age group, and seven geographically-based divisions at both the U-15/16 and U-17/18 levels.

The U-12 league was divided into seventeen divisions across three conferences:

=== U-12 team map ===
	East Conference	Central Conference	West Conference
1.	New York Metro	Chicagoland	Washington
2.	New England	Great Lakes	Oregon
3.	North Atlantic	Colorado	Bay Area
4.	Mid-Atlantic	Texas	LA
5.	Carolina		San Diego
6.	Georgia		
7.	Florida North		
8.	Florida South		

The U-13/14 league was divided into ten divisions across three conferences:

=== U-13 and U-14 team map ===
	East Conference	Central Conference	West Conference
1.	Northeast	Mid-America	Northwest
2.	Metro	Colorado	Southwest
3.	North Atlantic	Frontier	
4.	South Atlantic		
5.	Sunshine		

The U-15/16 and U-17/18 leagues were divided into seven divisions across three conferences:

=== U-15/16 and U-17/18 team map ===
	East Conference	Central Conference	West Conference
1.	Northeast	Mid-America	Northwest
2.	Atlantic	Frontier	Southwest
3.	Southeast		

== Notable alumni ==
Player	DA club
Kellyn Acosta	FC Dallas Academy
Aaron Long	Arsenal FC
Juan Agudelo	New York Red Bulls Academy
Paul Arriola	Arsenal FC
Steve Birnbaum	Pateadores
Alex Bono	Empire United
Will Bruin	St. Louis Scott Gallagher Missouri
Joe Corona	Nomads SC
Alphonso Davies	Vancouver Whitecaps
Joshua Gatt	Crew SC Academy Wolves
Luis Gil	IMG Academy
Lynden Gooch	Santa Cruz Breakers Academy
Bill Hamid	D.C. United Academy
Ethan Horvath	Real Colorado
Emerson Hyndman	FC Dallas Academy
Aron Jóhannsson	IMG Academy
Kekuta Manneh	Texas Rush / Lonestar SC
Matt Miazga	New York Red Bulls Academy
Jordan Morris	Seattle Sounders FC Academy
Darlington Nagbe	Internationals
Christian Pulisic	PA Classics
Giovanni Reyna	New York Soccer Club / New York City FC
Josh Sargent	St. Louis Scott Gallagher Missouri
Caleb Stanko	Vardar
Wil Trapp	Crew Academy SC
DeAndre Yedlin	Crossfire Premier / Seattle Sounders FC Academy
Gyasi Zardes	LA Galaxy Academy
Adrian Zendejas	Nomads SC
Weston McKennie	FC Dallas Academy
Tyler Adams	New York Red Bulls Academy
