= List of Seattle Reign FC seasons =

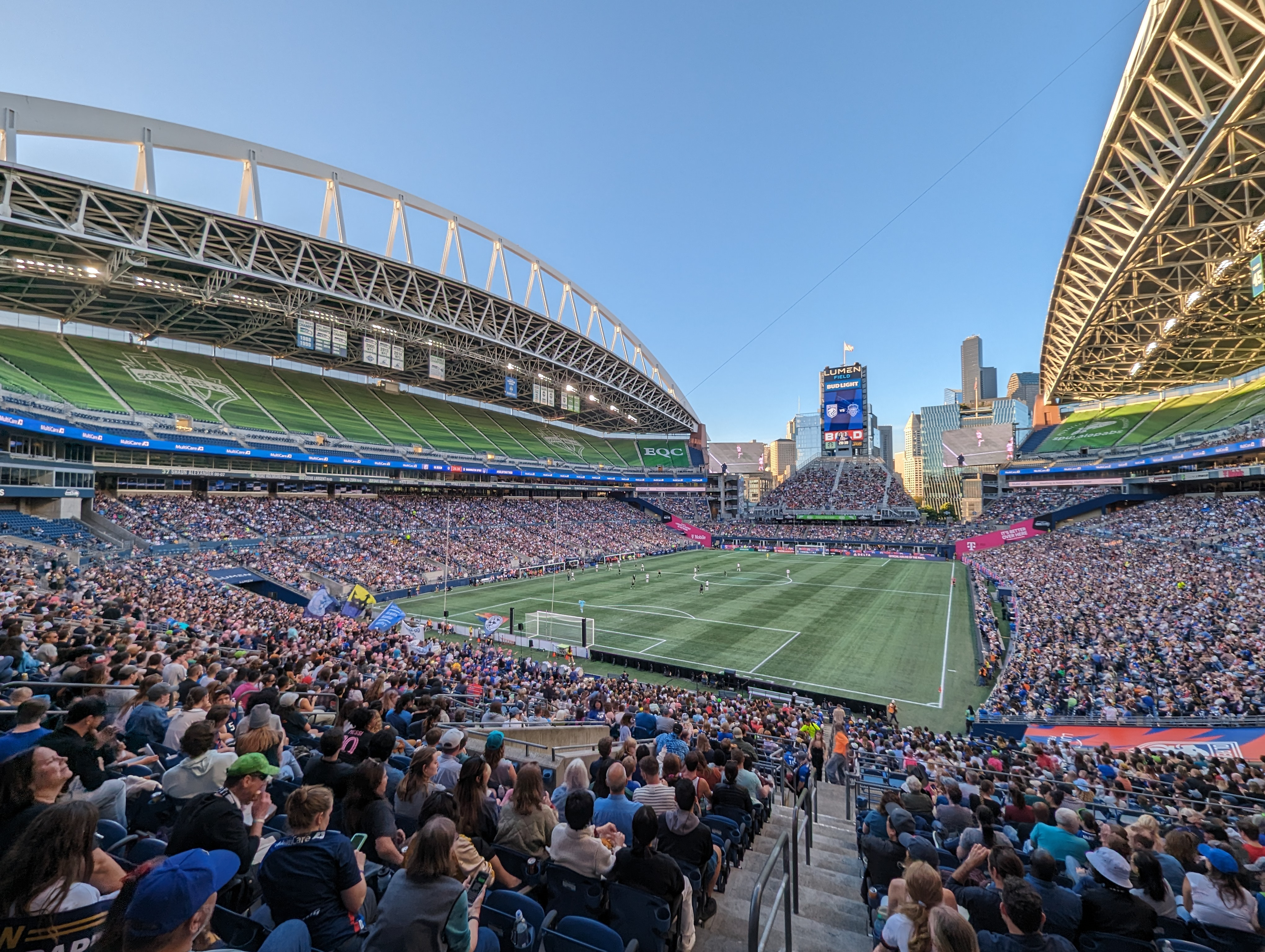
The final 2023 regular season match for Seattle Reign FC against the Washington Spirit at Lumen Field in Seattle

Seattle Reign FC is a professional women's soccer team based in Seattle, Washington, that competes in the National Women's Soccer League (NWSL), the highest level of women's club soccer in the United States. The team was established in 2012 and began play the following year in the inaugual NWSL season at Starfire Sports in Tukwila, Washington. The Reign moved to Memorial Stadium in Seattle for the 2014 season and stayed there until a move in 2019 to Cheney Stadium, a minor league ballpark in Tacoma, that coincided with a rebranding to Reign FC. The team was renamed to OL Reign after the French OL Groupe purchased a majority stake later in the year. The team returned to Seattle in 2022 and now plays at Lumen Field, which they share with Seattle Sounders FC of Major League Soccer and the Seattle Seahawks of the National Football League. The name reverted to Seattle Reign FC in 2024 ahead of a sale of the team to the Sounders.

As of 2026, the NWSL regular season has 30 matches and runs from March to early November; the team with the most points during the regular season is awarded the NWSL Shield. The top eight teams qualify for the NWSL Playoffs, a postseason tournament that culminates in the NWSL Championship, a single match that has been played at a predetermined host venue since 2015. An in-season cup tournament, the NWSL Challenge Cup, was created in 2020 and included results during the regular season until it was converted into a two-team super cup in 2024. The playoffs champion and top two teams in the NWSL Shield standings qualify for the CONCACAF W Champions Cup, a continental championship for women's teams in North America, Central America, and the Caribbean organized by CONCACAF since 2024. The winner of that competition qualifies for the FIFA Women's Club World Cup. An international tournament, named the NWSL x Liga MX Femenil Summer Cup, debuted in 2024 and features teams from Liga MX Femenil, the top women's league in Mexico.

The Reign are among the most successful NWSL teams, with three NWSL Shields and nine playoff appearances in fourteen seasons. They have not won an NWSL Championship but finished as runners-up on three occasions: in 2014, 2015, and 2023. In addition to league honors, the team won the 2022 edition of The Women's Cup, an invitational tournament with international teams. As of the end of the 2026 season, the Reign have played 14 seasons in NWSL that totaled 308 total regular season games with 135 wins, 97 losses, and 76 draws—a winning percentage of 0.562. During the 2023 season, the team had the fourth-highest average attendance among NWSL franchises with 13,609 spectators per regular season match. The Reign set the standalone match attendance record for the NWSL on October 6, 2023, at Lumen Field with 34,130 spectators watching a scoreless draw with the Washington Spirit during the last home regular season match for Megan Rapinoe.

== Key ==
Key to competitions

- National Women's Soccer League (NWSL) – The top-flight of women's soccer in the United States since its inaugural season in 2013.
- NWSL x Liga MX Femenil Summer Cup (SC) – An international, in-season tournament established in 2024 with all teams from NWSL and four teams from Liga MX Femenil, the top-flight women's league in Mexico.
- CONCACAF W Champions Cup (WCC) – The premier club competition in North American women's soccer since 2024, featuring teams that are champions of their respective domestic leagues. The winner will qualify for the FIFA Women's Club World Cup, planned to debut in 2026.
- NWSL Challenge Cup (CC) – A domestic cup competition organized by NWSL from 2020 to 2023; since 2024, it has been a single-match super cup between the NWSL Shield and NWSL Championship winners.
- NWSL Fall Series – A one-time tournament during the 2020 season that had been cancelled due to the COVID-19 pandemic.
- The Women's Cup – An annual invitational tournament with international club teams organized by Racing Louisville FC.

Key to colors and symbols

1st or W	Winners
2nd or RU	Runners-up
3rd	Third place
♦	League top scorer
Italics	Ongoing competition

Key to cup record

- DNE = Did not enter
- DNQ = Did not qualify
- NH = Competition not held or canceled
- QR = Qualifying round
- PR = Preliminary round
- GS = Group stage
- Ro32 = Round of 32
- Ro16 = Round of 16
- QF = Quarterfinals
- SF = Semifinals
- F = Final
- RU = Runners-up
- W = Winners

== Seasons ==
Results of Seattle Reign FC league and cup competitions by season
Season	League											Pos.	Playoffs	CC	Other		Average attendance (Note: Average attendance is calculated from league matches only and excludes matches played behind closed doors.)	Top goalscorer(s) (Note: Only includes goals scored during the regular season.)	
Season	Div	League	Pld	W	L	D	GF	GA	GD	Pts	PPG	Pos.	Playoffs	CC	Competition	Result	Average attendance	Player(s)	Goals
2013	1	NWSL	22	5	14	3	22	36	−14	18	0.82	7th	DNQ	—	—	—	2,306	Megan Rapinoe	5
2014	1	NWSL	24	16	2	6	50	20	+30	54	2.25	1st	RU	—	—	—	3,666	Kim Little	16 ♦
2015	1	NWSL	20	13	3	4	41	21	+20	43	2.15	1st	RU	—	—	—	4,060	Kim Little	10
2016	1	NWSL	20	8	6	6	29	21	+8	30	1.50	5th	DNQ	—	—	—	4,602	Manon Melis	7
2017	1	NWSL	24	9	8	7	43	37	+6	34	1.42	5th	DNQ	—	—	—	4,037	Megan Rapinoe	12
2018	1	NWSL	24	11	5	8	27	19	+8	41	1.71	3rd	SF	—	—	—	3,824	Jodie Taylor	9
2019	1	NWSL	24	10	6	8	27	27	0	38	1.58	4th	SF	—	—	—	5,213	Bethany Balcer	6
2020	1	NWSL	Regular season and playoffs canceled due to the COVID-19 pandemic											QF	NWSL Fall Series	7th	—	—	—
2021	1	NWSL	24	13	8	3	37	24	+13	42	1.75	2nd	SF	GS	—	—	5,240	Bethany Balcer	9
2022	1	NWSL	22	11	4	7	32	19	+13	40	1.82	1st	SF	SF	The Women's Cup	W	6,204	Megan Rapinoe Bethany Balcer	7
2023	1	NWSL	22	9	8	5	29	24	+5	32	1.45	4th	RU	SF	—	—	13,609	Bethany Balcer	6
2024	1	NWSL	26	6	15	5	27	44	−17	23	0.88	13th	DNQ	DNQ	NWSL x Liga MX Femenil Summer Cup	GS	8,503	Bethany Balcer	5
2025	1	NWSL	26	10	7	9	32	29	+3	39	1.50	5th	QF	DNQ	—	—	7,873	Jess Fishlock Emeri Adames	6
2026	1	NWSL	30	14	11	5	37	33	+4	47	1.57	8th	QF	DNQ	—	—	7,864	Maddie Mercado	10
Total (as of 2026)			308	135	97	76	433	354	+79	481	1.56						5,500	Jess Fishlock	52
