= 2024 Seattle Reign FC season =

Seattle Reign FC
2024 season
- Owner: The Carlyle Group (majority); Seattle Sounders FC
- Governor: Adrian Hanauer
- Head coach: Laura Harvey
- Stadium: Lumen Field
- NWSL: 13th of 14
- Playoffs: Did not qualify
- Summer Cup: Group stage
- Top goalscorer: League: Bethany Balcer (5); All: Bethany Balcer (5)
- Highest home attendance: 16,598
- Lowest home attendance: 5,083
- Average home league attendance: 8,503
Home colors	Away colors
- All statistics correct as of November 2, 2024.

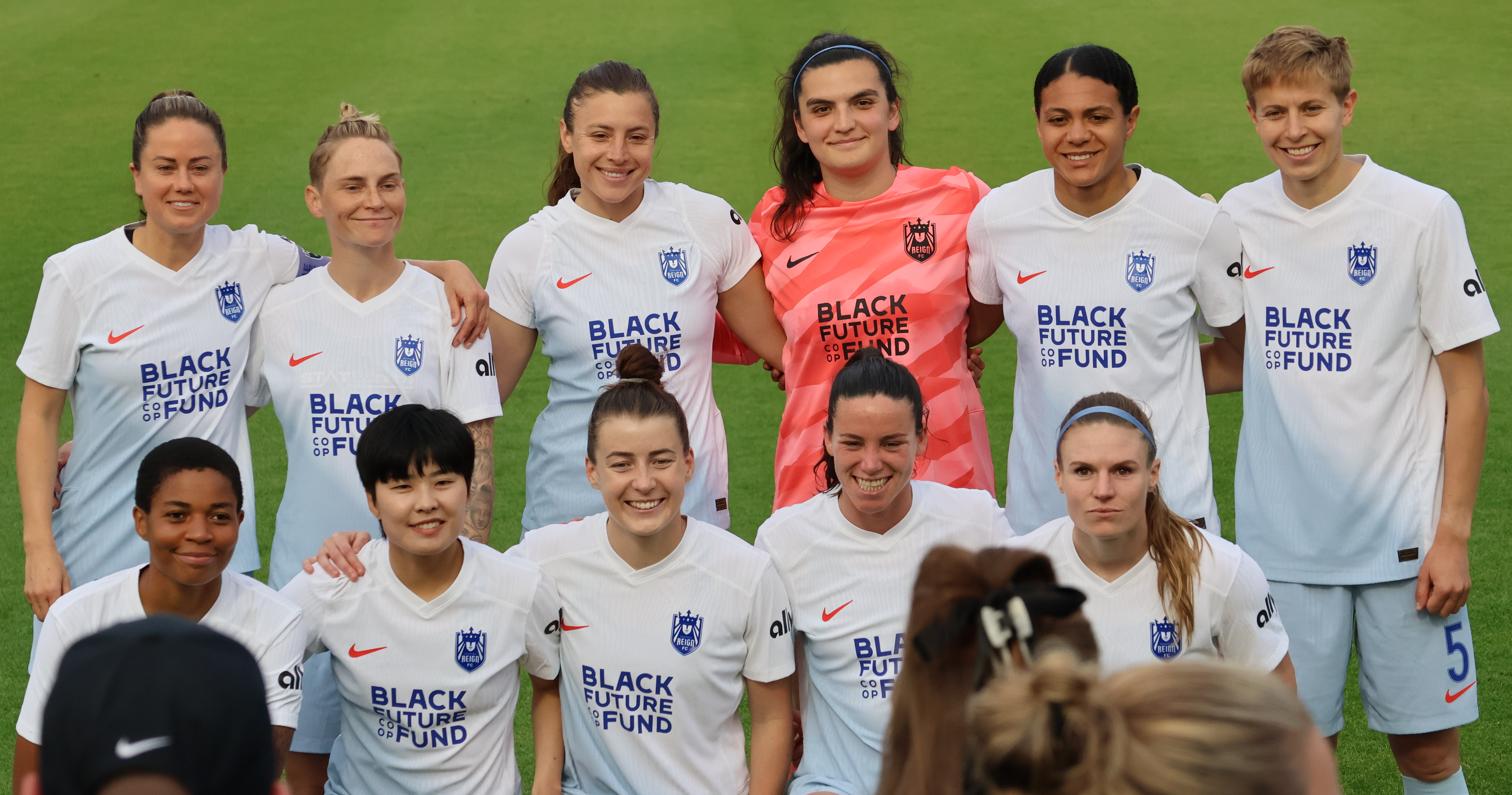
Starting lineup for week 6 Back: Barnes, Fishlock, Huerta, Ivory, Cook, Quinn Front: King, Ji, James-Turner, McClernon, Latsko

The 2024 season was the twelfth for Seattle Reign FC, a professional women's soccer team based in Seattle, Washington, United States. It was their twelfth season in the National Women's Soccer League (NWSL), the top division of women's soccer in the United States.

After playing as OL Reign from 2020 to 2023, the team's affiliation with Olympique Lyonnais and Olympique Lyonnais Féminin ended after December 31, 2023. Subsequently, the team rebranded on January 9, 2024, to Seattle Reign FC, their original name from 2013 to 2018. On June 17, 2024, the team was purchased by the Carlyle Group (majority owner) and Seattle Sounders FC.

== Team ==
=== Coaching staff ===
As of March 13, 2024.

Position	Name
Head coach	Laura Harvey
Head assistant coach	Scott Parkinson
Assistant coach	Kate Norton
Assistant coach and head of goalkeeping	Lloyd Yaxley

=== Roster ===
As of September 13, 2024.

No.	Nat.	Name	Date of birth (age)	Since	Previous team	Notes (Note: denotes a season-ending injury.)
Goalkeepers
1	(United States)	Claudia Dickey	January 6, 2000 (aged 24)	2022	(United States) North Carolina Tar Heels	
18	(United States)	Laurel Ivory	August 28, 1999 (aged 24)	2022	(United States) Virginia Cavaliers	
28	(United States)	Maia Pérez	October 19, 1999 (aged 24)	2023	(France) GPSO 92 Issy	
Defenders
3	(United States)	Lauren Barnes (captain)	May 31, 1989 (aged 34)	2013	(United States) Philadelphia Independence	
11	(United States)	Sofia Huerta	December 14, 1992 (aged 31)	2020	(Australia) Sydney FC	LOA
13	(United States)	Julia Lester	January 16, 1998 (aged 26)	2024	(United States) Racing Louisville	
17	(Wales)	Lily Woodham	September 3, 2000 (aged 23)	2024	(England) Reading	INT, LOA
21	(United States)	Phoebe McClernon	December 13, 1997 (aged 26)	2022	(United States) Orlando Pride	
22	(United States)	Ryanne Brown	January 21, 1999 (aged 25)	2022	(United States) Wake Forest Demon Deacons	
25	(United States)	Shae Holmes	March 8, 2000 (aged 24)	2023	(United States) Washington Huskies	
31	(Sweden)	Hanna Glas	April 16, 1993 (aged 30)	2024	(United States) Kansas City Current	INT
32	(United States)	Jordyn Bugg	August 11, 2006 (aged 17)	2024	(United States) San Diego Surf SC	U18
Midfielders
5	(Canada)	Quinn	August 11, 1995 (aged 28)	2019	(France) Paris FC	
6	(Wales)	Angharad James-Turner	June 1, 1994 (aged 29)	2024	(England) Tottenham Hotspur	INT
7	(United States)	Nikki Stanton	October 26, 1990 (aged 33)	2022	(United States) Chicago Red Stars	
10	(Wales)	Jess Fishlock	January 14, 1987 (aged 37)	2013	(England) Bristol Academy	
12	(United States)	Olivia Athens	August 1, 1998 (aged 25)	2022	(United States) UCLA Bruins	
16	(United States)	Jaelin Howell	November 21, 1999 (aged 24)	2024	(United States) Racing Louisville	
20	(United States)	Sam Meza	November 7, 2001 (aged 22)	2024	(United States) North Carolina Tar Heels	LOA
27	(United States)	Maddie Mercado	April 1, 2001 (aged 22)	2024	(United States) Notre Dame Fighting Irish	
33	(United States)	Olivia Van der Jagt	July 21, 1999 (aged 24)	2022	(United States) Washington Huskies	
46	(United States)	Ainsley McCammon	August 16, 2007 (aged 16)	2024	(United States) Solar SC	U18
91	(South Korea)	Ji So-yun	February 21, 1991 (aged 33)	2024	(South Korea) Suwon FC	INT
Forwards
9	(Canada)	Jordyn Huitema	May 8, 2001 (aged 22)	2022	(France) Paris Saint-Germain	INT
23	(United States)	Tziarra King	August 24, 1998 (aged 25)	2021	(United States) Utah Royals	
24	(United States)	Veronica Latsko	December 12, 1995 (aged 28)	2022	(United States) Houston Dash	
26	(United States)	McKenzie Weinert	December 2, 1998 (aged 25)	2024	(Australia) Melbourne Victory	LOA
30	(Haiti)	Nérilia Mondésir	January 17, 1999 (aged 25)	2024	(France) Montpellier HSC	INT
34	(Switzerland)	Ana-Maria Crnogorčević	October 3, 1990 (aged 33)	2024	(Spain) Atlético Madrid	INT
47	(United States)	Emeri Adames	April 3, 2006 (aged 17)	2024	(United States) Solar SC	U18

== Non-competitive ==
=== Preseason ===
February 3	Alajuelense	Canceled	Seattle Reign FC	Alajuela, Costa Rica
5:00 pm PST		Report		Stadium: Estadio Alejandro Morera Soto

February 9	Costa Rica	0–4	Seattle Reign FC	Alajuela, Costa Rica
6:00 pm PST		Report	Balcer 3'; King 14'; Brown 48'; Huitema 56' (pen.)	Stadium: Estadio Alejandro Morera Soto

March 6	Washington Huskies	1–2	Seattle Reign FC	Seattle
19:00	Holdenried	Box; Report	Fishlock 34'; Balcer 80' (pen.)	Stadium: Husky Soccer Stadium

March 9	Portland Thorns FC	v	Seattle Reign FC	Portland, Oregon
15:00		Report		Stadium: Providence Park
Note: Game played behind closed doors and results were not made publicly available

== Competitions ==
Win Draw Loss

=== Regular season ===
The NWSL regular season schedule was announced on January 25, 2024.

March 17 1	Seattle Reign FC	1–0	Washington Spirit	Seattle
3:00 pm PDT	Balcer 3' (pen.)	Box; Report	Wiesner (yellow card) 13'; Krueger (yellow card) 83'; Kingsbury (red card) 90+1'	Stadium: Lumen Field; Attendance: 8,557; Referee: Natalie Simon

March 23 2	Chicago Red Stars	2–1	Seattle Reign FC	Bridgeview, Illinois
1:00 pm PDT	Kuikka (yellow card) 28'; Bianchi 42'; Rall 68'	Box; Report	Ji 63'; McClernon (yellow card) 85'	Stadium: SeatGeek Stadium; Attendance: 5,494; Referee: Rebecca Pagan

March 29 3	San Diego Wave FC	1–0	Seattle Reign FC	San Diego
7:00 pm PDT	van Egmond 90+8'	Box; Report	Barnes (yellow card) 33'	Stadium: Snapdragon Stadium; Attendance: 16,746; Referee: Alex Billeter

April 14 4	Bay FC	3–2	Seattle Reign FC	San Jose, California
5:00 pm PDT	Sharples 48'; Loera 58'; Anderson 87'	Box; Report	Sharples 27' (o.g.); Balcer 83'	Stadium: PayPal Park; Attendance: 16,719; Referee: Ekaterina Koroleva

April 21 5	Seattle Reign FC	1–2	Chicago Red Stars	Seattle
3:00 pm PDT	Ji (yellow card) 51'; Huerta (yellow card) 66'; King 79'	Box; Report	Schlegel 4'; Malham (yellow card) 7'; Swanson 31'; Hocking (yellow card) 54'; Bianchi (yellow card) 90+5'	Stadium: Lumen Field; Attendance: 9,626; Referee: Elton Garcia

April 27 6	North Carolina Courage	1–0	Seattle Reign FC	Cary, North Carolina
4:00 pm PDT	Lussi 37'; Murphy (yellow card) 67'; Bench (yellow card) 70'	Box; Report		Stadium: WakeMed Soccer Park; Attendance: 8,135; Referee: Gerald Flores

May 3 7	Seattle Reign FC	2–1	San Diego Wave FC	Seattle
7:00 pm PDT	King (red card) 9'; James-Turner (yellow card) 21'; Balcer 34'; Athens (yellow card) 45+6'; Huerta (yellow card) 65'; McClernon (yellow card) 78'; Latsko 89'	Box; Report	Carusa 11'; Lundkvist (yellow card) 24'; Bennett (yellow card) 38'; van Egmond (yellow card) 45+5'; McCaskill (yellow card) 90+1'; McNabb (red card) 90+15'	Stadium: Lumen Field; Attendance: 7,030; Referee: Danielle Chesky

May 8 8	Seattle Reign FC	0–0	Kansas City Current	Seattle
7:00 pm PDT		Box; Report		Stadium: Lumen Field; Attendance: 5,083; Referee: Anya Voigt

May 11 9	Portland Thorns FC	4–0	Seattle Reign FC	Portland, Oregon
7:00 pm PDT	Moultrie 42' (yellow card) 61'; Smith 80' (pen.); Sugita 90+3'; Linnehan 90+8'	Box; Report	McClernon (yellow card) 58'; Huerta (yellow card) 79'; Athens (yellow card) 89'	Stadium: Providence Park; Attendance: 20,229; Referee: Abdou Ndiaye

May 19 10	Seattle Reign FC	2–3	Orlando Pride	Seattle
6:00 pm	Balcer 48' (yellow card) 45+1' (yellow-red card) 83'; James-Turner 45+5'; Cook (yellow card) 76'	Box; Report	Sams 9'; Banda 18', 58'; Doyle (yellow card) 90+4'; Allen (yellow card) 90+8'	Stadium: Lumen Field; Attendance: 6,781; Referee: Elijio Arreguin

May 24 11	Washington Spirit	3–2	Seattle Reign FC	Washington, D.C.
4:30 pm PDT	Bethune 21'; Sullivan 29' (pen.); Sarr 45'	Box; Report	Ivory (yellow card) 38'; Van der Jagt (yellow card) 43'; Latsko 45+5'; Adames 90+6'	Stadium: Audi Field; Attendance: 11,511; Referee: Joshua Encarnacion

June 9 12	Kansas City Current	5–2	Seattle Reign FC	Kansas City, Missouri
7:00 pm PDT	Chawinga 28', 47'; Lauren 45+2'; DiBernardo 46'; LaBonta 67' (pen.)	Box; Report	Huitema 24', 41'; Ivory (yellow card) 66'	Stadium: CPKC Stadium; Attendance: 11,500; Referee: Brad Jensen

June 16 13	Seattle Reign FC	0–0	Portland Thorns FC	Seattle
1:00 pm PDT	Brown (yellow card) 53'; Huitema (yellow card) 89'	Box; Report	Beckie (yellow card) 3'; Dias (yellow card) 67'; Müller (yellow card) 85'	Stadium: Lumen Field; Attendance: 9,052; Referee: Alyssa Nichols

June 23 14	Seattle Reign FC	1–1	Racing Louisville FC	Seattle
3:00 pm PDT	Balcer 10' (pen.); Huitema (yellow card) 45+12'	Box; Report	Wright (red card) 9'; Flint (yellow card) 31'; Turner 90+7'	Stadium: Lumen Field; Attendance: 10,715; Referee: Matthew Corrigan

June 30 15	NJ/NY Gotham FC	1–1	Seattle Reign FC	Harrison, New Jersey
10:00 am PDT	Lavelle 47'	Box; Report	McClernon (yellow card) 6'; Martin 90+9' (o.g.)	Stadium: Red Bull Arena; Attendance: 7,064; Referee: Elvis Osmanovic

July 7 16	Seattle Reign FC	1–1	Utah Royals FC	Seattle
3:00 pm PDT	Latsko 75'	Box; Report	Sentnor 67'	Stadium: Lumen Field; Attendance: 6,276; Referee: Matt Thompson

August 25 17	Seattle Reign FC	1–0	North Carolina Courage	Seattle
7:00 pm PDT	Murphy 90+7' (o.g.)	Box; Report		Stadium: Lumen Field; Attendance: 16,598; Referee: Greg Dopka

August 31 18	Racing Louisville FC	2–3	Seattle Reign FC	Louisville, Kentucky
4:30 pm PDT	Borges 6'; Flint 45'; DeMelo (yellow card) 62'	Box; Report	Huerta 15' (pen.) (yellow card) 90+6'; Howell (yellow card) 62'; Ji 75'; Wright 81' (o.g.)	Stadium: Lynn Family Stadium; Attendance: 5,011; Referee: Laura Rodriguez

September 6 19	Angel City FC	2–3	Seattle Reign FC	Los Angeles
7:00 pm PDT	Thompson 8'; Haračić (yellow card) 30'; Leroux 90+9'	Box; Report	Lester (yellow card) 12'; Huerta 31' (pen.); Ji 45+6'; King 58'	Stadium: BMO Stadium; Attendance: 16,023; Referee: Trevor Wiseman

September 16 20	Seattle Reign FC	0–2	NJ/NY Gotham FC	Seattle
7:00 pm PDT	King (yellow card) 59'	Box; Box; Report	Sheehan 41'; Martin (yellow card) 73'; Esther 85'	Stadium: Lumen Field; Attendance: 6,604; Referee: Shawn Tehini

September 21 21	Houston Dash	1–0	Seattle Reign FC	Houston
5:30 pm PDT	Nagasato 50'; Olivieri (yellow card) 60'; Andressa (yellow card) 81'; Ordóñez (yellow card) 90+6'; Campbell (yellow card) 90+8'	Box; Report	Glas (yellow card) 45+2'; Howell (yellow card) 77'	Stadium: Shell Energy Stadium; Referee: Jamie Padilla

September 29 22	Seattle Reign FC	0–1	Bay FC	Seattle
3:00 pm PDT		Box; Report	Oshoala 27' (pen.); Dydasco (yellow card) 58'	Stadium: Lumen Field; Attendance: 9,051; Referee: Elton Garcia

October 4 23	Seattle Reign FC	0–1	Angel City FC	Seattle
7:00 pm PDT	Howell (yellow card) 88'	Box; Box; Report	Vignola 34'; Dougherty Howard (yellow card) 85'; Hammond (yellow card) 90+5'	Stadium: Lumen Field; Attendance: 6,707; Referee: Matt Thompson

October 13 24	Utah Royals FC	3–0	Seattle Reign FC	Sandy, Utah
2:00 pm PDT	Lacasse 3', 20', 45+6'; Pogarch (yellow card) 51'; Tanaka (yellow card) 74'	Box; Report	James-Turner (yellow card) 4' (yellow-red card) 16'; Howell (yellow card) 67'	Stadium: America First Field; Referee: Elvis Osmanovic

October 18 25	Seattle Reign FC	2–1	Houston Dash	Seattle
7:00 pm PDT	Athens 22'; Mondésir 65'	Box; Report; Report	Olivieri 25' (pen.); Chapman (yellow card) 51'	Stadium: Lumen Field; Attendance: 8,456; Referee: Brad Jensen

November 2 26	Orlando Pride	3–2	Seattle Reign FC	Orlando, Florida
2:00 pm PDT	Watt 8'; Abello 24'; Marta (yellow card) 45+3' (goal) 56'	Box; Report	Huitema 9'; Mercado 83'	Stadium: Inter&Co Stadium; Attendance: 7,765; Referee: Melinda Sopka Homa

==== Regular-season standings ====
Pos	Team	Pld	W	D	L	GF	GA	GD	Pts
10	San Diego Wave FC	26	6	7	13	24	35	−11	25
11	Utah Royals	26	7	4	15	22	40	−18	25
12	Angel City FC	26	7	6	13	29	42	−13	24 (Note: Angel City FC were deducted three points for breaching spending cap rules.)
13	Seattle Reign FC	26	6	5	15	27	44	−17	23
14	Houston Dash	26	5	5	16	20	42	−22	20

Source: NWSL
Rules for classification: Tiebreakers

==== Results summary ====
Overall								Home						Away					
Pld	W	D	L	GF	GA	GD	Pts	W	D	L	GF	GA	GD	W	D	L	GF	GA	GD
26	6	5	15	27	44	−17	23	4	4	5	11	13	−2	2	1	10	16	31	−15

Last updated: November 2, 2024.
Source: NWSLsoccer.com

=== NWSL x Liga MX Femenil Summer Cup ===
Pos	Team	Pld	W	PW	PL	L	GF	GA	GD	Pts	UTA	POR	SEA	TIJ
1	(United States Soccer Federation) Utah Royals	3	2	0	0	1	9	4	+5	6	—	3–1	1–2	5–1
2	(United States Soccer Federation) Portland Thorns FC	3	2	0	0	1	7	3	+4	6	1–3	—	1–0	5–0
3	(United States Soccer Federation) Seattle Reign FC	3	1	0	0	2	4	5	−1	3	2–1	0–1	—	2–3
4	(Mexican Football Federation) Tijuana	3	1	0	0	2	4	12	−8	3	1–5	0–5	3–2	—

Source: NWSL
Rules for classification: tiebreakers

==== Group stage ====
July 19 GS1	Seattle Reign FC (United States)	2–1	(United States) Utah Royals FC	Seattle
6:00 pm PDT	Athens 43' (pen.); Stanton (yellow card) 50'; Meza (yellow card) 63'; Huerta 76'	Box; Report	Tucker 45+5'; Betfort (yellow card) 75'	Stadium: Lumen Field; Referee: Elijio Arreguin

July 28 GS2	Seattle Reign FC (United States)	2–3	(Mexico) Tijuana	Seattle
3:00 pm PDT	Adames 47'; Mercado 62'; James-Turner (yellow card) 69'	Box; Report	Solórzano 2', 40', 84'; Pelayo (yellow card) 89'	Stadium: Lumen Field; Referee: Jaclyn Metz

July 31 GS3	Portland Thorns FC (United States)	1–0	(United States) Seattle Reign FC	Portland, Oregon
7:00 pm PDT	Linnehan 40'	Box; Report		Stadium: Providence Park; Referee: Corbyn May

== Appearances and goals ==
As of November 2, 2024; only players who have made appearances are listed.

No.	Pos	Nat	Player	Total		Regular season		Playoffs		Summer Cup	
No.	Pos	Nat	Player	Apps	Goals	Apps	Goals	Apps	Goals	Apps	Goals
Goalkeepers:
1	GK	(United States) USA	Claudia Dickey	18	0	18	0	0	0	0	0
18	GK	(United States) USA	Laurel Ivory	12	0	8+1	0	0	0	3	0
Defenders:
3	DF	(United States) USA	Lauren Barnes	21	0	17+4	0	0	0	0	0
13	DF	(United States) USA	Julia Lester	7	0	2+3	0	0	0	2	0
21	DF	(United States) USA	Phoebe McClernon	28	0	22+4	0	0	0	2	0
22	DF	(United States) USA	Ryanne Brown	10	0	3+6	0	0	0	1	0
25	DF	(United States) USA	Shae Holmes	21	0	12+7	0	0	0	2	0
31	DF	(Sweden) SWE	Hanna Glas	7	0	6+1	0	0	0	0	0
32	DF	(United States) USA	Jordyn Bugg	8	0	5+1	0	0	0	2	0
Midfielders:
5	MF	(Canada) CAN	Quinn	15	0	13+2	0	0	0	0	0
6	MF	(Wales) WAL	Angharad James-Turner	17	1	12+3	1	0	0	1+1	0
7	MF	(United States) USA	Nikki Stanton	10	0	0+7	0	0	0	3	0
10	MF	(Wales) WAL	Jess Fishlock	19	0	17+1	0	0	0	0+1	0
12	MF	(United States) USA	Olivia Athens	23	2	8+12	1	0	0	2+1	1
16	MF	(United States) USA	Jaelin Howell	8	0	5+3	0	0	0	0	0
27	MF	(United States) USA	Maddie Mercado	8	2	0+5	1	0	0	2+1	1
33	MF	(United States) USA	Olivia Van der Jagt	15	0	7+8	0	0	0	0	0
46	MF	(United States) USA	Ainsley McCammon	4	0	1+1	0	0	0	1+1	0
91	MF	(South Korea) KOR	Ji So-yun	28	3	22+4	3	0	0	1+1	0
Forwards:
9	FW	(Canada) CAN	Jordyn Huitema	18	3	17+1	3	0	0	0	0
23	FW	(United States) USA	Tziarra King	26	2	18+5	2	0	0	1+2	0
24	FW	(United States) USA	Veronica Latsko	26	3	11+12	3	0	0	2+1	0
30	FW	(Haiti) HAI	Nérilia Mondésir	10	1	2+8	1	0	0	0	0
34	FW	(Switzerland) SUI	Ana-Maria Crnogorčević	10	0	8+2	0	0	0	0	0
47	FW	(United States) USA	Emeri Adames	24	2	6+15	1	0	0	2+1	1
Players who left the team during the season:
4	DF	(United States) USA	Alana Cook	11	0	9+2	0	0	0	0	0
8	FW	(United States) USA	Bethany Balcer	18	5	13+2	5	0	0	1+2	0
11	DF	(United States) USA	Sofia Huerta	22	3	19	2	0	0	1+2	1
17	DF	(Wales) WAL	Lily Woodham	9	0	5+3	0	0	0	1	0
20	MF	(United States) USA	Sam Meza	2	0	0	0	0	0	1+1	0
26	FW	(United States) USA	McKenzie Weinert	6	0	0+4	0	0	0	2	0
Own goals for:
	MF	(United States) USA	Nealy Martin (6/30 @ NJNY)	1	1	0+1	1	0	0	0	0
	GK	(United States) USA	Casey Murphy (8/25 v. NC)	1	1	1	1	0	0	0	0
	DF	(United States) USA	Kayla Sharples (4/14 @ BAY)	1	1	1	1	0	0	0	0
	DF	(United States) USA	Arin Wright (8/31 @ LOU)	1	1	1	1	0	0	0	0

== Transactions ==
For incoming transfers, dates listed are when Seattle Reign FC officially signed the players to the roster. Transactions where only the rights to the players are acquired (e.g., draft picks) are not listed. For outgoing transfers, dates listed are when Seattle Reign FC officially removed the players from its roster, not when they signed with another team. If a player later signed with another team, her new team will be noted, but the date listed here remains the one when she was officially removed from the Seattle Reign FC roster.

=== Transfers in ===
Date	Player	Pos.	Signed From	Notes	Ref.
January 24, 2024	(United States) Julia Lester	DF	(United States) Racing Louisville	Acquired, along with $20,000 in allocation money, in exchange for Sam Hiatt in a three-team trade that also involved Gotham FC	
January 24, 2024	(South Korea) Ji So-yun	MF	(South Korea) Suwon FC	Undisclosed	
January 31, 2024	(Wales) Angharad James-Turner	MF	(England) Tottenham Hotspur	Undisclosed	
January 31, 2024	(Wales) Lily Woodham	DF	(England) Reading	Undisclosed	
February 21, 2024	(United States) McKenzie Weinert	FW	(Australia) Melbourne Victory	Free	
March 7, 2024	(United States) Sam Meza	MF	(United States) North Carolina Tar Heels	Draftee	
March 13, 2024	(United States) Emeri Adames	FW	(United States) Solar SC	U-18 Entry	
March 13, 2024	(United States) Maddie Mercado	MF	(United States) Notre Dame Fighting Irish	Draftee	
April 20, 2024	(United States) Kaylie Collins	GK	(Australia) Western Sydney Wanderers	Goalkeeper replacement player	
July 19, 2024	(United States) Jordyn Bugg	DF	(United States) San Diego Surf SC	U-18 Entry	
July 19, 2024	(United States) Ainsley McCammon	MF	(United States) Solar SC	U-18 Entry	
July 29, 2024	(Haiti) Nérilia Mondésir	FW	(France) Montpellier HSC	Undisclosed	
August 5, 2024	(Switzerland) Ana-Maria Crnogorčević	FW	(Spain) Atlético Madrid	Undisclosed	
August 19, 2024	(United States) Jaelin Howell	MF	(United States) Racing Louisville	Traded along with $50,000 in allocation money in exchange for Bethany Balcer	
September 2, 2024	(Sweden) Hanna Glas	DF	(United States) Kansas City Current	Traded in exchange for $10,000 in intra-league transfer funds and an additional $10,000 in intra-league transfer funds pending conditions met	

==== Draft picks ====
Draft picks are not automatically signed to the team roster. Only those who are signed to a contract will be listed as incoming transfers.

Player	Pos.	Previous Team	Notes	Ref.
(United States) Sam Meza	MF	(United States) North Carolina Tar Heels	No. 17 pick	
(United States) Maddie Mercado	MF	(United States) Notre Dame Fighting Irish	No. 27 pick	
(United States) Makena Carr	DF	(United States) Saint Mary's Gaels	No. 43 pick	

=== Transfers out ===
Date	Player	Pos.	Destination Team	Notes	Ref.
November 13, 2023	(United States) Megan Rapinoe	FW		Retired	
November 20, 2023	(United States) Marley Canales	MF	(United States) Spokane Zephyr	Waived	
November 20, 2023	(Brazil) Angelina	MF	(United States) Orlando Pride	Free	
November 20, 2023	(United States) Rose Lavelle	MF	(United States) Gotham FC	Free	
November 20, 2023	(United States) Emily Sonnett	DF	(United States) Gotham FC	Free	
December 15, 2023	(United States) Alyssa Malonson	DF	(United States) Bay FC	First pick of the 2024 NWSL Expansion Draft	
December 15, 2023	(United States) Elyse Bennett	FW	(United States) Utah Royals	Second pick of the 2024 NWSL Expansion Draft	
January 24, 2024	(United States) Sam Hiatt	DF	(United States) Gotham FC	Traded in exchange for Julia Lester and $20,000 in allocation money in a three-team trade that also involved Racing Louisville	
June 16, 2024	(United States) Kaylie Collins	GK	(United States) Washington Spirit	Waived	
June 21, 2024	(Mexico) Jimena López	DF	(Mexico) Tigres UANL	Free	
July 22, 2024	(United States) Alana Cook	DF	(United States) Kansas City Current	Traded in exchange for $40,000 in allocation money, $75,000 in intra-league transfer funds, and $25,000 in intra-league transfer funds pending performance-based incentives met	
August 9, 2024	(Brazil) Luany	MF	(Spain) Atlético Madrid	Undisclosed	
August 19, 2024	(United States) Bethany Balcer	FW	(United States) Racing Louisville	Traded in exchange for Jaelin Howell and $50,000 in allocation money	

=== Loans out ===
Start	End	Player	Pos.	Destination Team	Notes	Ref.
July 3, 2023	June 21, 2024	(Mexico) Jimena López	DF	(Spain) Valencia		
August 11, 2023	June 30, 2024	(Brazil) Luany	MF	(Spain) Madrid CFF		
August 1, 2024	December 31, 2024	(United States) Sam Meza	MF	(United States) Dallas Trinity		
August 5, 2024	December 31, 2024	(United States) McKenzie Weinert	FW	(United States) Spokane Zephyr		
September 12, 2024	June 30, 2025	(United States) Sofia Huerta	DF	(France) Lyon		
September 13, 2024	January 31, 2025	(Wales) Lily Woodham	DF	(England) Crystal Palace		

=== New contracts ===
Date	Player	Pos.	Notes	Ref.
November 17, 2023	(United States) Alana Cook	DF	Option exercised	
November 17, 2023	(United States) Claudia Dickey	GK	Re-signed	
December 8, 2023	(United States) Shae Holmes	DF	Option exercised	
December 8, 2023	(United States) Alyssa Malonson	DF	Re-signed	
December 11, 2023	(United States) Maia Pérez	GK	Re-signed	
December 12, 2023	(United States) Ryanne Brown	DF	Re-signed	
December 14, 2023	(United States) Olivia Athens	MF	Re-signed	
December 14, 2023	(United States) Laurel Ivory	GK	Re-signed	
January 11, 2024	(United States) Bethany Balcer	FW	Signed to a new contract	
January 17, 2024	(United States) Tziarra King	FW	Re-signed	
January 18, 2024	(United States) Nikki Stanton	MF	Re-signed	
February 7, 2024	(United States) Veronica Latsko	FW	Contract extended	
March 20, 2024	(United States) Phoebe McClernon	DF	Contract extended	
March 27, 2024	(United States) Julia Lester	DF	Contract extended	
April 11, 2024	(United States) Sofia Huerta	DF	Contract extended	
August 1, 2024	(United States) Sam Meza	MF	Option exercised	
August 5, 2024	(United States) McKenzie Weinert	FW	Contract extended	
September 5, 2024	(Canada) Jordyn Huitema	FW	Contract extended	
October 16, 2024	(United States) Shae Holmes	DF	Contract extended	
October 29, 2024	(United States) Ryanne Brown	DF	Contract extended	

== Awards ==
=== Goal of the Week ===
Week	Player	Ref.
2	(South Korea) Ji So-yun	
5	(United States) Tziarra King	
7	(United States) Veronica Latsko	
17	(South Korea) Ji So-yun	

=== Save of the Week ===
Week	Player	Ref.
7	(United States) Laurel Ivory	
15	(United States) Claudia Dickey	
