= 2026 Seattle Reign FC season =

Seattle Reign FC
2026 season
- Owner: The Carlyle Group (majority); Seattle Sounders FC
- Governor: Adrian Hanauer
- Head coach: Laura Harvey
- Stadium: Lumen Field; One Spokane Stadium (first 3 home matches)
- NWSL: 8th
- Playoffs: Quarterfinals
- Top goalscorer: Maddie Mercado (10)
- Highest home attendance: 16,095 (vs ORL, Nov 1)
- Lowest home attendance: 3,023 (vs KC, Mar 25)
- Average home league attendance: 7,863
Home colors	Away colors	Third colors
- All statistics correct as of November 8, 2026.

The 2026 season was the fourteenth for Seattle Reign FC, a professional women's soccer team based in Seattle, Washington, United States. It was their fourteenth season in the National Women's Soccer League (NWSL), the top division of women's soccer in the United States.

== Summary ==
On January 16, 2026, Seattle Reign signed Evan O'Steen. She was the youngest goalkeeper ever to sign in the NWSL.

The ballclub played its first three home matches at One Spokane Stadium as its primary venue Lumen Field was undergoing preparations for the 2026 FIFA World Cup.

== Team ==
=== Coaching staff ===
As of July 12, 2026.

Position	Name
Head coach	Laura Harvey
Head assistant coach	Scott Parkinson
Assistant coach	Kate Norton
Assistant coach and head of goalkeeping	Lloyd Yaxley

=== Roster ===
As of August 9, 2026.

No.	Nat.	Name	Date of birth (age)	Since	Previous team	Notes
Goalkeepers
1	United States	Claudia Dickey	January 6, 2000 (aged 26)	2022	(United States) North Carolina Tar Heels	
18	United States	Evan O'Steen	March 22, 2008 (aged 17)	2026	(United States) Florida State University	U18
35	United States	Neeku Purcell	October 7, 2003 (aged 22)	2025	(United States) Brooklyn FC	Out on loan
38	United States	Cassie Miller	April 28, 1995 (aged 30)	2025	(United States) Gotham FC	
Defenders
11	United States	Sofia Huerta	December 14, 1992 (aged 33)	2020	(Australia) Sydney FC	
14	United States	Emily Mason	October 23, 2002 (aged 23)	2025	(United States) Rutgers Scarlet Knights	
21	United States	Phoebe McClernon	December 13, 1997 (aged 28)	2022	(United States) Orlando Pride	
22	United States	Ryanne Brown	January 21, 1999 (aged 27)	2022	(United States) Wake Forest Demon Deacons	
23	United States	Jordyn Bugg	August 11, 2006 (aged 19)	2024	(United States) San Diego Surf SC	
24	United States	Madison Curry	January 23, 2001 (aged 25)	2025	(United States) Angel City FC	
25	United States	Shae Holmes	March 8, 2000 (aged 26)	2023	(United States) Washington Huskies	
Midfielders
8	Wales	Angharad James-Turner	June 1, 1994 (aged 31)	2024	(England) Tottenham Hotspur	INT
10	Wales	Jess Fishlock	January 14, 1987 (aged 39)	2013	(England) Bristol Academy	INT
16	United States	Ainsley McCammon	August 16, 2007 (aged 18)	2024	(United States) Solar SC	
17	United States	Sally Menti	March 10, 2002 (aged 24)	2025	(United States) Santa Clara Broncos	
20	United States	Sam Meza	November 7, 2001 (aged 24)	2024	(United States) North Carolina Tar Heels	
36	United States	Sofia Cedeño	August 10, 2006 (aged 19)	2025	(Canada) Halifax Tides FC	Out on loan
Forwards
2	United States	Maddie Mercado	April 1, 2001 (aged 24)	2024	(United States) Notre Dame Fighting Irish	
5	United States	Maddie Dahlien	July 25, 2004 (aged 21)	2025	(United States) North Carolina Tar Heels	
6	United States	Lynn Biyendolo	May 21, 1993 (aged 32)	2025	(United States) Gotham FC	ML
7	United States	Emeri Adames	April 3, 2006 (aged 19)	2024	(United States) Solar SC	
12	Canada	Holly Ward	October 25, 2003 (aged 22)	2026	(Canada) Vancouver Rise FC	INT
13	United States	Brittany Ratcliffe	February 7, 1994 (aged 32)	2026	(United States) Washington Spirit	
19	United States	Mia Fishel	April 30, 2001 (aged 24)	2025	(England) Chelsea	
30	Haiti	Nérilia Mondésir	January 17, 1999 (aged 27)	2024	(France) Montpellier HSC	INT
33	United States	Ruby Hladek	January 5, 2003 (aged 23)	2026	(United States) Utah Valley University	STC

== Competitions ==
Win Draw Loss

=== Regular season ===
==== Regular season standings ====
Pos	Team	Pld	W	D	L	GF	GA	GD	Pts	Qualification
6	Portland Thorns FC	30	14	8	8	50	41	+9	50	Playoffs
7	Utah Royals	30	14	5	11	44	39	+5	47	Playoffs
8	Seattle Reign FC	30	14	5	11	37	33	+4	47	Playoffs
9	North Carolina Courage	30	14	3	13	52	42	+10	45	
10	Denver Summit FC	30	11	8	11	53	42	+11	41	

Source: NWSL
Rules for classification: 1) points; 2) total goal difference; 3) total wins; 4) total goals scored; 5) head-to-head points; 6) head-to-head goal goals scored; 7) fewest disciplinary points; 8) coin toss (if 2 clubs tied) or drawing of lots (if ≥3 clubs tied).

==== Results summary ====
Overall								Home						Away					
Pld	W	D	L	GF	GA	GD	Pts	W	D	L	GF	GA	GD	W	D	L	GF	GA	GD
30	14	5	11	37	33	+4	47	9	2	4	17	10	+7	5	3	7	20	23	−3

Last updated: November 1, 2026.
Source: NWSLsoccer.com

==== Results by matchday ====
Matchday	1	2	3	4	5	6	7	8	9	10	11	12	13	14	15	16	17	18	19	20	21	22	23	24	25	26	27	28	29	30
Ground	A	A	H	H	H	H	A	H	H	A	A	A	H	A	A	A	H	H	A	A	H	H	H	A	A	H	H	A	A	H
Result	W	L	W	W	D	L	D	L	L	W	L	L	W	L	W	W	D	W	L	D	W	W	W	L	L	W	L	W	D	W
Position	5	9	4	3	3	6	5	8	9	9	10	11	10	12	10	9	9	8	8	8	8	8	8	8	8	8	9	8	8	8

Updated to match(es) played on November 1, 2026. Source: NWSLsoccer.com
A = Away; H = Home; W = Win; D = Draw; L = Loss; P = Postponed; = NWSL Shield; = NWSL Playoffs

==== Matches ====
March 15, 2026 1	Orlando Pride	1–2	Seattle Reign FC	Orlando, Florida
1:00 p.m. PDT (UTC-7)	Banda 51'	Report	Mason (yellow card) 7'; Fishlock 24', (yellow card) 50'; Ratcliffe 83'; Curry (yellow card) 88'; Mercado (yellow card) 90+4'	Stadium: Inter&Co Stadium; Attendance: 16,320; Referee: Alex Billeter

March 20, 2026 2	Portland Thorns FC	2–0	Seattle Reign FC	Portland, Oregon
7:00 p.m. PDT (UTC-7)	Bogere (yellow card) 8' (red card) 9'; Tordin 28'; Turner 37'; Reyes (red card) 57'; Müller (yellow card) 58'	Report	Ward (yellow card) 90+1'	Stadium: Providence Park; Attendance: 21,321; Referee: Elvis Osmanovic

March 25, 2026 3	Seattle Reign FC	3–0	Kansas City Current	Spokane, Washington
6:00 p.m. PDT (UTC-7)	James-Turner 18'; Ratcliffe 26'; Mercado 33'; Brown (yellow card) 90+6'	Report	Hocking (yellow card) 12'	Stadium: One Spokane Stadium; Attendance: 3,023; Referee: Tom Snyder

March 28, 2026 4	Seattle Reign FC	2–1	Racing Louisville FC	Spokane, Washington
3:30 p.m. PDT	Mercado 10'; Mondésir 41'	Report	Hodge (yellow card) 63'; Philippus 90+4'	Stadium: One Spokane Stadium; Attendance: 3,879; Referee: Gerald Flores

April 4, 2026 5	Seattle Reign FC	0–0	Denver Summit FC	Spokane, Washington
6:45 p.m. MDT (UTC-6)		Report		Stadium: One Spokane Stadium; Attendance: 3,952; Referee: Atahan Yaya

April 26, 2026 6	Seattle Reign FC	0–3	Utah Royals	Seattle, Washington
5:00 pm MDT (UTC-7)	Meza (yellow card) 80'	Report	Cronin 1'; Miura 7'; Tejada (yellow card) 13'; Lacasse 45+1'; Thomsen (yellow card) 70'	Stadium: Lumen Field; Attendance: 8,211; Referee: Matt Thompson

May 1, 2026 7	Houston Dash	0–0	Seattle Reign FC	Houston, Texas
7:00 p.m. CDT (UTC-5)		Report	McCammon (yellow card) 28'; Mercado (yellow card) 39'; Huerta (yellow card) 51'; Curry (yellow card) 68'	Stadium: Shell Energy Stadium; Attendance: 5,465; Referee: Abdou Ndiaye

May 10, 2026 8	Seattle Reign FC	0–1	Washington Spirit	Seattle, Washington
4:00 p.m. EDT (UTC-7)	Mondésir (yellow card) 65'	Report	Bernal (yellow card) 36'; Morgan (yellow card) 72'; Martínez 83'	Stadium: Lumen Field; Attendance: 7,597; Referee: Jaclyn Metz

May 15, 2026 9	Seattle Reign FC	0–2	Gotham FC	Seattle, Washington
7:00 p.m. PDT (UTC-7)		Report	Shaw (yellow card) 22', (goal) 24'; Davidson 57'	Stadium: Lumen Field; Attendance: 6,406; Referee: Alyssa Pennington

May 22, 2026 10	Boston Legacy FC	1–2	Seattle Reign FC	Pawtucket, Rhode Island
8:00 p.m. EDT (UTC-4)	Traoré 90+4'	Report	Huerta 11' (pen.); Dahlien 51'; Curry (yellow card) 79'	Stadium: Centreville Bank Stadium; Attendance: 9,141; Referee: John Matto

May 30, 2026 11	Washington Spirit	2–1	Seattle Reign FC	Washington, D.C.
6:30 p.m. EDT (UTC-4)	Tsé (yellow card) 5'; Santos 18'; Sullivan (yellow card) 78'; Hershfelt 81'	Report	Ward (yellow card) 17'; Di Guglielmo 44' (o.g.); Menti (yellow card) 59'; McClernon (yellow card) 68'	Stadium: Audi Field; Attendance: 19,365; Referee: Alex Billeter

July 4, 2026 12	North Carolina Courage	3–1	Seattle Reign FC	Cary, North Carolina
7:30 p.m. EDT (UTC-4)	Sanchez 22', 71'; Jackson 64' (pen.)	Report	Menti 19'; Curry (yellow card) 63'	Stadium: WakeMed Soccer Park; Attendance: 7,126; Referee: Cristian Campo Hernandez

July 12, 2026 13	Seattle Reign FC	2–0	Portland Thorns FC	Seattle, Washington
7:00 p.m. PDT (UTC-7)	Brown 8'; Mercado 43'; Meza (yellow card) 56'	Report	Castellanos (yellow card) 88'	Stadium: Lumen Field; Attendance: 14,793; Referee: Abdou Ndiaye

July 18, 2026 14	Gotham FC	3–2	Seattle Reign FC	New York, New York
9:00 a.m. PDT (UTC-7)	Freeman (yellow card) 12'; González 81', 90+4'; Lavelle 90+7'	Report	Fishel 14' (pen.); Mercado 22'; Meza (yellow card) 45'; Dahlien (penalty missed) 57'	Stadium: Icahn Stadium; Attendance: 4,738; Referee: Calin Radosav

July 26, 2026 15	San Diego Wave FC	0–2	Seattle Reign FC	San Diego, California
2:00 p.m. PDT (UTC-7)	Corley (yellow card) 48'	Report	Mercado 17', (yellow card) 45+2'; Bugg 20'; McClernon (yellow card) 25'	Stadium: Snapdragon Stadium; Attendance: 10,796; Referee: Mark Verso

August 1, 2026 16	Bay FC	2–3	Seattle Reign FC	San Jose, California
5:45 p.m. PDT (UTC-7)	Bebar 13'; Bailey (yellow card) 45+5'; Conti (yellow card) 51'; Barry 75'	Report	Fishel 5', (yellow card) 45+2'; Dahlien 10'; Meza (yellow card) 64'; Mondésir (yellow card) 83'; Fishlock 85'	Stadium: PayPal Park; Attendance: 11,439; Referee: Alyssa Pennington

August 9, 2026 17	Seattle Reign FC	2–2	Angel City FC	Seattle, Washington
6:00 p.m. PDT (UTC-7)	Menti 50'; Fishel 52'; Huerta (yellow card) 76'	Report	Thompson 32'; Chilufya 72'; Sams (yellow card) 86'	Stadium: Lumen Field; Attendance: 7,102; Referee: Brad Jensen

August 14, 2026 18	Seattle Reign FC	1–0	Chicago Stars FC	Seattle, Washington
7:00 p.m. PDT (UTC-7)	Mercado 53'	Report		Stadium: Lumen Field; Attendance: 7,646; Referee: Marie Durr

August 19, 2026 19	Racing Louisville FC	2–1	Seattle Reign FC	Louisville, Kentucky
6:30 p.m. EDT (UTC-4)	Sears 35', 52'	Report	Mercado 19'; James-Turner (yellow card) 33'	Stadium: Lynn Family Stadium; Attendance: 5,258; Referee: Brandon Stevis

August 22, 2026 20	Kansas City Current	1–1	Seattle Reign FC	Kansas City, Missouri
5:30 p.m. CDT (UTC-5)	Debinha 51' (pen.); Bethune (yellow card) 72'	Report	Sharples 11' (o.g.); James-Turner (yellow card) 38'; Menti (yellow card) 56'; Huerta (yellow card) 59'; Dahlien (yellow card) 70'	Stadium: CPKC Stadium; Attendance: 11,500; Referee: Katja Koroleva

August 30, 2026 21	Seattle Reign FC	1–0	Houston Dash	Seattle, Washington
4:00 p.m. PDT (UTC-7)	Dahlien 52'; Ratcliffe (yellow card) 90+3'	Report	Van Zanten (yellow card) 11'; Ivanović (yellow card) 90+1'	Stadium: Lumen Field; Attendance: 7,878; Referee: Laura Rodriguez

September 6, 2026 22	Seattle Reign FC	1–0	San Diego Wave FC	Seattle, Washington
6:00 p.m. PDT (UTC-7)	Mercado 29'; Bugg (yellow card) 59'; McClernon (yellow card) 90+1'	Report	Van Zanten (red card) 13'	Stadium: Lumen Field; Attendance: 9,104; Referee: Abdou Ndiaye

September 12, 2026 23	Seattle Reign FC	2–0	Bay FC	Seattle, Washington
5:00 p.m. PDT (UTC-7)	Huerta 51' (pen.); Fishel (yellow card) 88'; Ratcliffe 90+3'	Report	Barry (yellow card) 60'	Stadium: Lumen Field; Attendance: 8,191; Referee: Lauren Aldrich

September 16, 2026 24	Angel City FC	3–1	Seattle Reign FC	Los Angeles, California
7:00 p.m. PDT (UTC-7)	Sentnor 20' (pen.); Ary Borges 40'; Niehues (yellow card) 52'; Suarez 81'	Report	Curry (yellow card) 34'; Meza (yellow card) 43'; Menti (yellow card) 80'; Huerta 90+2'	Stadium: BMO Stadium; Attendance: 13,208; Referee: Atahan Yaya

September 19, 2026 25	Denver Summit FC	2–1	Seattle Reign FC	Centennial, Colorado
7:50 p.m. MDT (UTC-6)	Sheehan 44'; Flint 50'; Smith (yellow card) 80'	Report	Huerta (yellow card) 45+2'; Ratcliffe 55'; Menti (yellow card) 73'; McClernon (yellow card) 74'	Stadium: Centennial Stadium; Attendance: 12,272; Referee: Danielle Chesky
Note: Kickoff delayed from 6:45 p.m. MDT by weather.

September 25, 2026 26	Seattle Reign FC	2–0	Boston Legacy FC	Seattle, Washington
5:30 p.m. PDT (UTC-7)	Fishlock 23', 64'	Report	Davis (yellow card) 18'	Stadium: Lumen Field; Attendance: 7,116; Referee: Elton García

October 2, 2026 27	Seattle Reign FC	0–1	North Carolina Courage	Seattle, Washington
10:00 p.m. EDT (UTC-4)	McCammon (yellow card) 3'; Mondésir (yellow card) 78'	Report	Paul 48'; Parkinson (yellow card) 73'; Wickenheiser (yellow card) 80'	Stadium: Lumen Field; Attendance: 6,952; Referee: Mark Verso

October 18, 2026 28	Chicago Stars FC	1–3	Seattle Reign FC	Evanston, Illinois
6:00 p.m. CDT (UTC-5)	Charley 90'	Report	Mercado 38', 84'; Mondésir 80'	Stadium: Martin Stadium; Attendance: 3,501; Referee: Jeremy Scheer

October 23, 2026 28	Utah Royals	0–0	Seattle Reign FC	Sandy, Utah
7:30 p.m. MDT (UTC-6)		Report	Fishlock (yellow card) 20'; Bugg (yellow card) 37'	Stadium: America First Field; Attendance: 14,149; Referee: Alexandra Billeter

November 1, 2026 30	Seattle Reign FC	1–0	Orlando Pride	Seattle, Washington
2:00 p.m. PT (UTC-8)	Bugg 68'	Report		Stadium: Lumen Field; Attendance: 16,095; Referee: Calin Radosav

=== Playoffs ===
Quarterfinals
1	Gotham FC	1
8	Seattle Reign FC	0
4	Kansas City Current (a.e.t.)	1
5	Angel City FC	0
2	San Diego Wave FC	0
7	Utah Royals	1
3	Washington Spirit
6	Portland Thorns FC

Semifinals
1	Gotham FC
4	Kansas City Current
7	Utah Royals

Championship

November 8, 2026 Quarterfinals	Gotham FC	1–0	Seattle Reign FC	Harrison, New Jersey
12:30 pm ET	Bugg 4' (o.g.); Shaw (yellow card) 76'; Ouahabi (yellow card) 90'	Report		Stadium: Sports Illustrated Stadium; Attendance: 11,328; Referee: Brad Jensen

== Statistics ==
As of August 14, 2026

=== Appearances and goals ===
Starting appearances are listed first, followed by substitute appearances after the + symbol where applicable.

No.	Pos	Nat	Player	Total		NWSL	
No.	Pos	Nat	Player	Apps	Goals	Apps	Goals
Goalkeepers
1	GK	(United States) USA	Claudia Dickey	15	0	15	0
18	GK	(United States) USA	Evan O'Steen	0	0	0	0
35	GK	(United States) USA	Neeku Purcell	0	0	0	0
38	GK	(United States) USA	Cassie Miller	3	0	3	0
Defenders
11	DF	(United States) USA	Sofia Huerta	17	1	17	1
14	DF	(United States) USA	Emily Mason	13	0	10+3	0
21	DF	(United States) USA	Phoebe McClernon	18	0	18	0
22	DF	(United States) USA	Ryanne Brown	10	1	5+5	1
23	DF	(United States) USA	Jordyn Bugg	10	1	9+1	1
24	DF	(United States) USA	Madison Curry	15	0	12+3	0
25	DF	(United States) USA	Shae Holmes	1	0	1	0
Midfielders
8	MF	(Wales) WAL	Angharad James-Turner	16	1	6+10	1
10	MF	(Wales) WAL	Jess Fishlock	7	2	5+2	2
16	MF	(United States) USA	Ainsley McCammon	16	0	14+2	0
17	MF	(United States) USA	Sally Menti	16	2	10+6	2
20	MF	(United States) USA	Sam Meza	16	0	15+1	0
36	MF	(United States) USA	Sofia Cedeño	1	0	0+1	0
Forwards
2	FW	(United States) USA	Maddie Mercado	18	6	16+2	6
5	FW	(United States) USA	Maddie Dahlien	16	2	14+2	2
7	FW	(United States) USA	Emeri Adames	15	0	5+10	0
12	FW	(Canada) CAN	Holly Ward	12	0	3+9	0
13	FW	(United States) USA	Brittany Ratcliffe	16	2	2+14	2
19	FW	(United States) USA	Mia Fishel	14	3	11+3	3
30	FW	(Haiti) HAI	Nérilia Mondésir	17	1	7+10	1
33	FW	(United States) USA	Ruby Hladek	0	0	0	0
Other players (departed during season, out on loan, season-ending injury, etc.)
6	FW	(United States) USA	Lynn Biyendolo	0	0	0	0

== Transactions ==
=== Transfers in ===
Date	Player	Pos.	Previous club	Notes	Ref.
December 8, 2025	(United States) Sofia Cedeño	MF	(Canada) Halifax Tides FC	Signed to a standard contract after initially joining as a preseason trialist	
December 8, 2025	(United States) Neeku Purcell	GK	(United States) Brooklyn FC	Signed to a standard contract after initially joining as a short-term replacement player in 2025	
January 16, 2026	(United States) Evan O'Steen	GK			
January 20, 2026	(United States) Brittany Ratcliffe	FW	(United States) Washington Spirit	Free agent	
March 12, 2026	(United States) Ruby Hladek	FW		Free agent	
March 13, 2026	(Canada) Holly Ward	FW	(Canada) Vancouver Rise FC	Transfer, undisclosed fee	

=== Transfers out ===
Date	Player	Pos.	Destination Team	Notes	Ref.
January 6, 2026	(South Korea) Ji So-yun	MF	(South Korea) Suwon FC Women		
January 14, 2026	(United States) Maddie Prohaska	GK	(United States) Racing Louisville FC	Traded in exchange for $25,000 in allocation money and $25,000 in intra-league transfer funds	
March 12, 2026	(Canada) Jordyn Huitema	FW	(United States) Chicago Stars FC	Traded in exchange for $200,000 in allocation money and $300,000 in intra-league transfer funds	
