= 2022 The Women's Cup =

Tournament details
- Host country: United States
- City: Louisville, Kentucky
- Dates: August 14–20, 2022
- Teams: 6 (from 4 confederations)
- Venue: 1 (in 1 host city)

Final positions
- Champions: (United States) OL Reign
- Runners-up: (United States) Racing Louisville FC
- Third place: (Mexico) Club América
- Fourth place: (Italy) AC Milan

Tournament statistics
- Matches played: 7
- Goals scored: 27 (3.86 per match)
- Top scorer(s): Alison González; Kiana Palacios (3)
- All statistics correct as of August 21, 2022.

The 2022 The Women's Cup was the second edition of The Women's Cup, a friendly invitational tournament of women's soccer matches. It was hosted at Lynn Family Stadium in Louisville, Kentucky, United States, from August 14 to 20, 2022. The field expanded from four teams in 2021 to six. OL Reign won by defeating defending champions and hosts Racing Louisville FC 2–1.

== Teams ==
Nation	Team	League
United States	Racing Louisville FC (hosts)	National Women's Soccer League
United States	OL Reign	National Women's Soccer League
Japan	Tokyo Verdy Beleza	WE League
Italy	AC Milan	Serie A
England	Tottenham Hotspur	Women's Super League
Mexico	Club América	Liga MX Femenil

== Venue ==
Louisville, Kentucky	2022 The Women's Cup (the United States)
Lynn Family Stadium	2022 The Women's Cup (the United States)
Capacity: 11,700	2022 The Women's Cup (the United States)

== Broadcasting ==
In 2022, The Women's Cup was streamed in the United States exclusively on Paramount+ in the United States, with delayed replays broadcast on CBS Sports Network. Elsewhere, it was broadcast or streamed on various services and networks:

Region or Nation	Service
Latin America; The Caribbean	DirectTV Sports
Japan	Nippon TV
Sub-Saharan Africa	W-Sports
Germany; Austria; Switzerland	Streamster

All other regions could stream directly from the official website.

== Bracket ==
Quarterfinals
(Italy) AC Milan	3
(Japan) Tokyo Verdy Beleza	1
(England) Tottenham Hotspur	1
(Mexico) Club América	2

Semifinals
(United States) Racing Louisville	2
(Italy) AC Milan	0
(United States) OL Reign	2
(Mexico) Club América	1
Fifth-place match
(Japan) Tokyo Verdy Beleza	2
(England) Tottenham Hotspur	1

Finals
(United States) Racing Louisville	1
(United States) OL Reign	2
Third-place match
(Italy) AC Milan	4
(Mexico) Club América	5

== Matches ==
Visiting international clubs played each other in the quarterfinal round, with Club América and AC Milan advancing over Tottenham and Tokyo Verdy, respectively.

=== Quarterfinals ===
August 14, 2022
16:00 EDT

AC Milan (Italy)	3–1	(Japan) Tokyo Verdy Beleza
Piemonte 29'; Asllani 54', 80'	Report; Story	Iwashimizu (yellow card) 73'; Shimizu 82'

Lynn Family Stadium, Louisville, Kentucky

August 14, 2022
19:00 EDT

Tottenham Hotspur (England)	1–2	(Mexico) Club América
Karczewska 64'	Report	Palacios 10'; Camberos 14'

Lynn Family Stadium, Louisville, Kentucky

=== Semifinals ===
August 17, 2022
17:00 EDT

OL Reign (United States)	2–1	(Mexico) Club América
Latsko (yellow card) 66'; King 78'; Van der Jagt 82'	Report	Palacios 59'

Lynn Family Stadium, Louisville, Kentucky

August 17, 2022
20:00 EDT

Racing Louisville FC (United States)	2–0	(Italy) AC Milan
Olofsson (yellow card) 5'; Nadim 12'; Wang 24'	Report	Rubio (yellow card) 17'; Piemonte (yellow card) 41'; Árnadóttir (yellow card) 50'

Lynn Family Stadium, Louisville, Kentucky

=== Fifth-place match ===
August 17, 2022
11:00 EDT

Tokyo Verdy Beleza (Japan)	2–1	(England) Tottenham Hotspur
Ueki 19'; Miyagawa (yellow card) 44'; Iwashimizu 81'	Report	Ayane 55', (yellow card) 56'

Lynn Family Stadium, Louisville, Kentucky

=== Third-place match ===
August 20, 2022
16:00 EDT

AC Milan (Italy)	4–5	(Mexico) Club América
Cimini 38'; Bergamaschi 45'; Carage (yellow card) 50'; Fusetti (yellow card) 80'; Thomas 85'; Piemonte 88'	Report; Report	Martínez 4'; Palacios 58'; González 73', 75', 90+2'; Camberos (yellow card) 82'; Valera (yellow card) 82'

Lynn Family Stadium, Louisville, Kentucky

=== Championship ===
August 20, 2022
19:00 EDT

Racing Louisville FC (United States)	1–2	(United States) OL Reign
Davis 34'	Report; Story; Highlights	Huerta (yellow card) 20'; Huitema 66'; Athens 59'

Lynn Family Stadium, Louisville, Kentucky

=== Goalscorers ===
There were 27 goals scored in 7 matches, for an average of 3.86 goals per match.

3 goals

- (Mexico) Alison González, AMÉ
- (Mexico) Kiana Palacios, AMÉ

2 goals

- (Sweden) Kosovare Asllani, ACM
- (Italy) Martina Piemonte, ACM

1 goal

- (Italy) Valentina Bergamaschi, ACM
- (Italy) Linda Tucceri Cimini, ACM
- (France) Lindsey Thomas, ACM
- (Mexico) Scarlett Camberos, AMÉ
- (Mexico) Katty Martínez, AMÉ
- (United States) Olivia Athens, RGN
- (Canada) Jordyn Huitema, RGN
- (United States) Tziarra King, RGN
- (United States) Olivia Van der Jagt, RGN
- (United States) Kirsten Davis, LOU
- (Denmark) Nadia Nadim, LOU
- (China) Wang Shuang, LOU
- (Japan) Azusa Iwashimizu, TVB
- (Japan) Risa Shimizu, TVB
- (Japan) Riko Ueki, TVB
- (Morocco) Rosella Ayane, TOT
- (Poland) Nikola Karczewska, TOT

Source: The Women's Cup

== Awards ==
- Most Valuable Player: (United States) Tziarra King, OL Reign
