= Veronica Latsko =

American soccer player (born 1995)

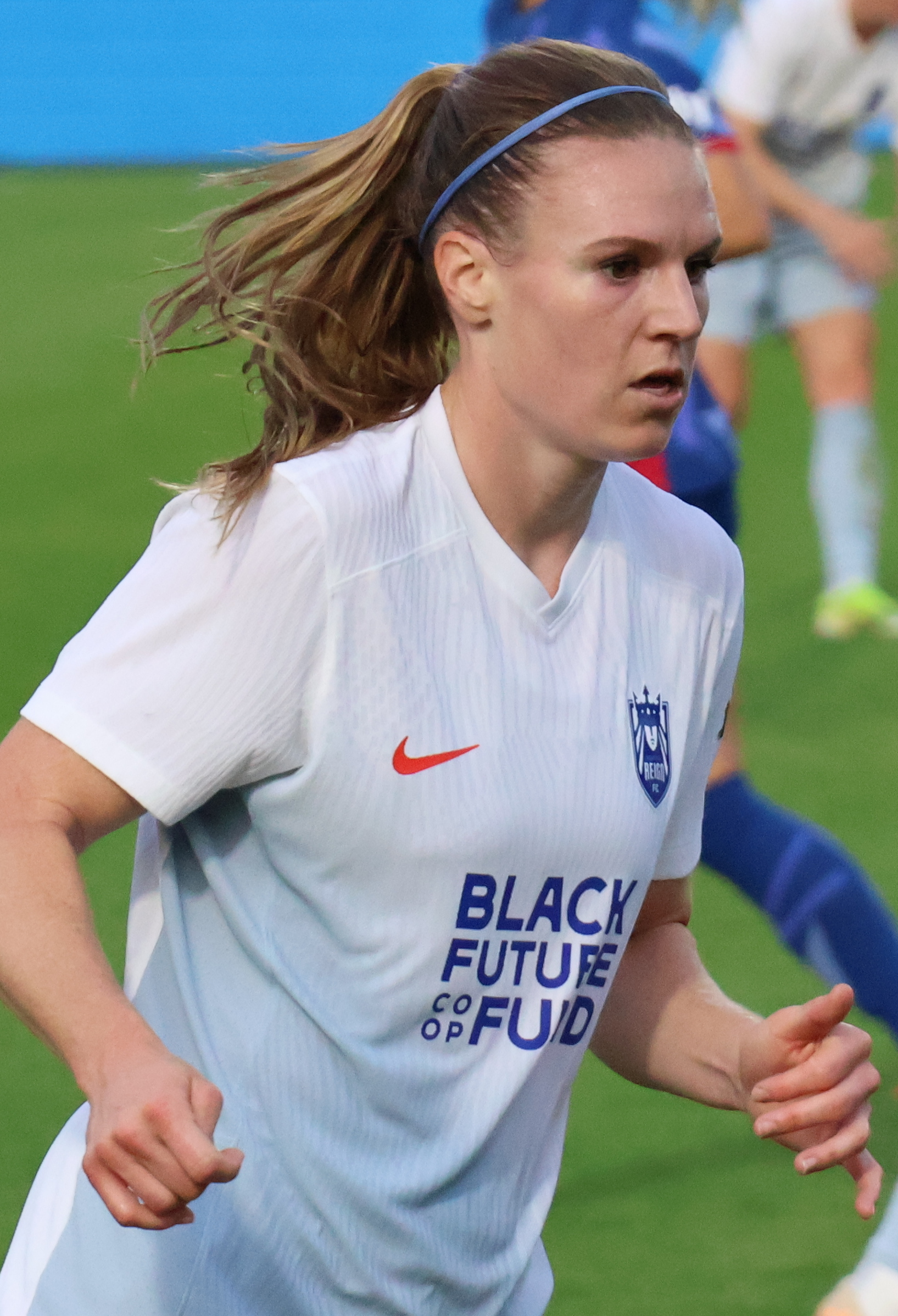
- Latsko with the Seattle Reign in 2024

Personal information
- Full name: Veronica Anne Latsko
- Date of birth: December 12, 1995 (age 30)
- Place of birth: Venetia, Pennsylvania
- Height: 5 ft 8 in (1.73 m)
- Position: Forward

College career
Years	Team	Apps	(Gls)
2014–2017	Virginia Cavaliers	93	(26)

Senior career*
Years	Team	Apps	(Gls)
2018–2021	Houston Dash	51	(10)
2018–2019	→ Adelaide United (loan)	12	(9)
2019–2020	→ Sydney FC (loan)	10	(3)
2022–2025	Seattle Reign	61	(8)
Total		134	(30)
- * Club domestic league appearances and goals as of 18:10, November 8, 2025 (UTC)

Veronica Anne Latsko (born December 12, 1995) is an American former professional soccer player who played as a forward. She played college soccer for the Virginia Cavaliers before being selected by the Houston Dash in the 2018 NWSL College Draft. She has also played for fellow NWSL club Seattle Reign FC, as well as on loan for Australian teams Adelaide United and Sydney FC.

== College career ==
Latsko made 93 appearances for the Virginia Cavaliers during her four-year college career. In 2014 and 2017 she appeared in every game for Virginia. In 2017 she tied the UVA single-game record for points and was and All-ACC first team selection.

== Club career ==
=== Houston Dash ===
Latsko was selected by the Houston Dash with the 28th pick in the 2018 NWSL College Draft. On March 24 she officially signed with the club and made her debut the following day against the Chicago Red Stars.

Latsko scored her first career goal on May 18 against Sky Blue FC, her goal was the game-winning goal in a 3–2 win for Houston. She also scored the game-winning goal on May 24 against the Seattle Reign. It was Houston's first ever win over Seattle.

==== Loan to Adelaide United ====
Latsko signed with Adelaide United for the 2018–19 W-League season, alongside Houston Dash teammate Amber Brooks. Latsko finished tied for second in the Golden Boot race with 9 goals, 4 behind Golden Boot winner Sam Kerr.

==== Loan to Sydney ====
Latsko returned to Australia for the 2019–20 W-League season, signing on loan with Sydney FC joining Houston Dash teammate Sofia Huerta.

=== Seattle Reign ===
In January 2022, the Dash traded Latsko to Seattle Reign FC in exchange for the Reign's 3rd round pick in the 2023 NWSL Draft, along with $30,000 in NWSL allocation money. Latsko scored her first goal with the Reign on March 26, 2022, in a 3–1 win over Angel City FC in the NWSL Challenge Cup. She notched her first assist with her new club in the same match. During the 2022 Challenge Cup, Latsko started all 7 of the Reign's games, including a semifinal defeat to the Washington Spirit.

In 2023, Latsko and the Reign advanced to the NWSL playoffs. Latsko scored in both the Reign's quarterfinal and semifinal games, netting the lone goals of the match in each fixture. She started in the championship match against NJ/NY Gotham FC, which the Reign lost, 2–1. Latsko had a one-on-one opportunity in front of goal during the second half, but her attempt was saved by opposing goalkeeper Mandy Haught. On February 7, 2024, the Latsko and the Reign agreed to a contract extension through 2025.

On September 12, 2025, Latsko announced that she would retire from professional soccer at the end of the 2025 NWSL season.

== Honors ==
Houston Dash

- NWSL Challenge Cup: 2020

OL Reign

- The Women's Cup: 2022
- NWSL Shield: 2022
