= Tziarra King =

American soccer player (born 1998)

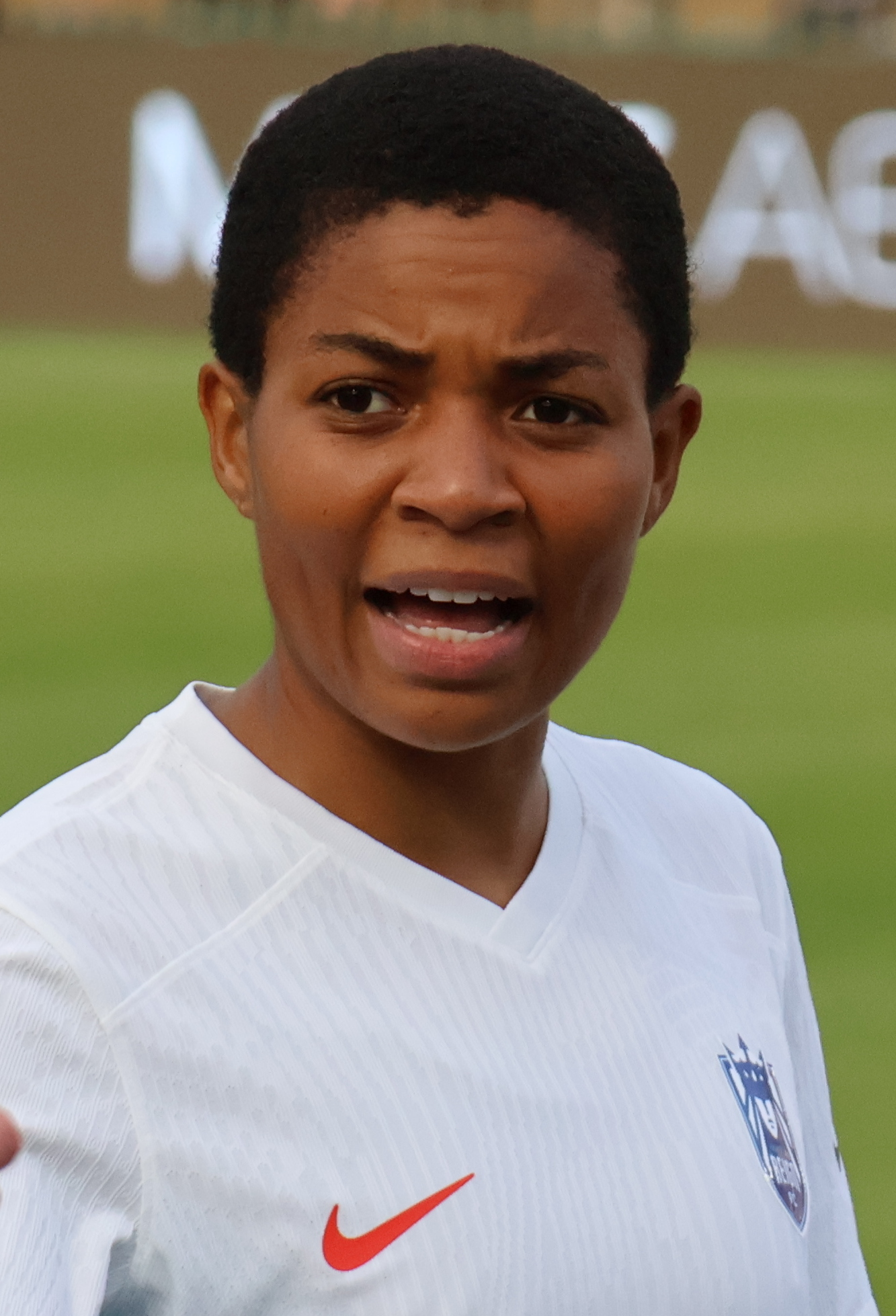
- King with the Seattle Reign in 2024

Personal information
- Full name: Tziarra Lanae King
- Date of birth: August 24, 1998 (age 28)
- Place of birth: Sicklerville, New Jersey, U.S.
- Height: 5 ft 8 in (1.73 m)
- Position: Forward

Team information
- Current team: Brooklyn FC
- Number: 3

Youth career
- –2014: Winslow Tigers Soccer Club
- 2015–2016: Princeton SA

College career
| Years | Team | Apps | (Gls) |
| 2016–2019 | NC State Wolfpack | 88 | (48) |

Senior career*
| Years | Team | Apps | (Gls) |
| 2020 | Utah Royals | 0 | (0) |
| 2021–2024 | Seattle Reign | 68 | (5) |
| 2026– | Brooklyn FC | 1 | (0) |

International career
| 2014 | United States U16 (futsal) | | |
| 2015 | United States U18 (futsal) | | |
| 2018 | United States U23 | | |
- * Club domestic league appearances and goals as of 05:36, August 16, 2026 (UTC)

Tziarra Lanae King (born August 24, 1998) is an American professional soccer player who plays as a forward for USL Super League club Brooklyn FC. She played college soccer for the NC State Wolfpack and was drafted by the Utah Royals in the first round of the 2020 NWSL College Draft. She has also played for Seattle Reign FC.

== Early life ==
Raised in Sicklerville, New Jersey, King played for the varsity soccer team at Winslow Township High School where she set a record as the all-time leading scorer (for both girls and boys) with 105 career goals and 36 assists. She was named to the First-Team All-South Jersey team in 2014 and 2015. During high school, King also competed in track-and-field and was named New Jersey state champion in both the indoor and outdoor 4×400 during her junior year. During her senior year, her 51 goals and 14 assists ranked first in the state of New Jersey.

King played club soccer for Winslow Tigers where she helped lead the team to regional and state championships. She also played for Princeton SA IGFA 97/98 Tigers NPL and won the 2015 US Club Mid-Atlantic Regional and NEWSS Championships.

King was a regional and national futsal champion, and competed internationally for the United States Youth Futsal National Team. Also a top scholar, she was on the Honor Roll all four years and a member of the National Honor Society.

== College career ==
King attended North Carolina State University where she played for the NC State Wolfpack women's soccer team from 2016 to 2019. She was one of two players nominated by the Atlantic Coast Conference for the 2020 NCAA Woman of the Year Award, after being the conference's first women's soccer player to win the Scholar-Athlete of the Year award.

As a freshman in the 2016 season, King was a starting forward in all matches and was the Wolfpack's leading scorer with eight goals, including four game-winners. She competed on the pitch a total of 1,702 minutes. Her penalty kick goal against Minnesota helped North Carolina advance to the second round of the 2016 NCAA Championship. Top Drawer Soccer ranked King as the No. 28 freshman player in the country. During the 2017 season, King led the Wolfpack in goals scored (17), game-winning goals (5), and points (40). She also ranked second in the Atlantic Coast Conference (ACC) in goals and points, fourth in goals in the NCAA, and fifth in points in the NCAA. King was a starter in all 22 matches of her sophomore season and competed a total of 1,716 minutes. She scored a hat trick in North Carolina's 4–1 win over Notre Dame in the ACC Championship quarterfinals. She scored braces against Arkansas, East Carolina University, Louisville, and Syracuse. She was twice named ACC Offensive Player of the Week. As a junior in the 2018 ACC season, King was the Wolfpack's leading scorer for the third consecutive year with 10 goals and 26 points. She was named to the MAC Hermann Trophy Watch List and finished the season ranked 47th on Top Drawer Soccer's Top 100 Player Rankings. During the 2019 season, King scored 13 goals and recorded 32 points ranking third in the ACC and 35th in the NCAA for both goals and points. She was named to the All-ACC First Team, United Soccer Coaches First Team All-Region, and United Soccer Coaches Third Team All-America. She earned TopDrawerSoccer Best XI Second Team, CoSIDA Academic All-America First Team and United Soccer Coaches Scholar All-America Second Team honors. She was twice named ACC Offensive Player of the Week and earned 2019 ACC All-Tournament Team honors.

King finished her collegiate career ranked third all-time on the Wolfpack in career goals (48) and points (115) as well as with career starts (88). She was the second player in program history to earn four-time All-ACC and multiple scholar All-America honors.

== Club career ==
=== Utah Royals FC, 2020 ===
King was drafted 8th overall in the 2020 NWSL College Draft by the Utah Royals FC, the first ever NC State Wolfpack player to be drafted into the NWSL. She made her professional debut in the 2020 NWSL Challenge Cup in June 2020, scoring her first professional goal less than 20 minutes after entering the field as a second-half substitute in a 3–3 draw against the Houston Dash. King was a starter in all four matches of the tournament under head coach Laura Harvey.

=== Seattle Reign, 2021–2024 ===
Ahead of the 2021 season, King was traded to the Reign in January 2021. She was a starter in 7 of the 15 matches she played. She scored the club's second goal in its 2–0 win against Orlando Pride on July 24 and provided the assist to Jess Fishlock's goal in the tenth minute. King was subsequently named NWSL Player of the Week. The Reign finished in second place during the regular season with a 13–8–3 record. After advancing to the NWSL Playoffs, they were eliminated by eventual champions Washington Spirit.

In 2022, King helped the Reign finish in first place during the regular season, winning the NWSL Shield.

King scored her first goal of 2024 in a 2–1 loss to the Chicago Red Stars on April 21, which was named the NWSL Goal of the Week.

On December 20, 2024, King announced her departure from the club.

=== Brooklyn FC, 2026– ===
On August 10, 2026, it was announced that King had signed with USL Super League club Brooklyn FC. She made her Super League debut on August 15, 2026, starting and playing the entirety of Brooklyn's season-opening defeat to Lexington SC.

== Coaching career ==
In 2025, King joined the West Seattle Rhodies FC as an Assistant Coach & Professional Player Mentor.

== Honors ==
Seattle Reign

- The Women's Cup: 2022
- NWSL Shield: 2022

Individual

- The Women's Cup Most Valuable Player: 2022
- NWSL Player of the Week: Week 10 2021
- ACC Women's Soccer Scholar-Athlete of the Year: 2019

== Other work ==
In September 2020, King entered into a collaboration with the National Women's Hockey League to help improve representation on NWHL merchandise.

== Personal life ==
King goes by the nickname "Zee". In October 2022, she and fellow Seattle Reign player Jess Fishlock announced their engagement. On December 12, 2023, they married in Fishlock's native Wales at Sant Ffraed House.
