= List of National Women's Soccer League stadiums =

Locations of National Women's Soccer League teams.
Current club; Future club

The National Women's Soccer League (NWSL) is a top-level professional league for women's soccer in the United States. The league has 16 teams in its 2026 season, following the addition of expansion clubs Boston Legacy FC and Denver Summit FC.

== Primary stadiums ==
These are the primary stadiums in the 2026 NWSL season:

Team	Location	Stadium	Capacity	Capacity (standard configuration)	Surface	Field lines	Image
Angel City FC	Los Angeles, California	BMO Stadium	22,000	22,000	Bermuda grass	soccer-specific	
Bay FC	San Jose, California	PayPal Park	18,000	18,000	SISGrass hybrid grass	soccer-specific	
Boston Legacy FC	Foxborough, Massachusetts	Gillette Stadium (Note: Boston Legacy FC played eight 2026 home matches at Gillette Stadium and seven at Centreville Bank Stadium in Pawtucket, Rhode Island while renovations to its planned permanent home, White Stadium, were ongoing.)	65,878	65,878	grass (Note: Gillette Stadium's playing surface was temporarily converted to natural grass ahead of the 2026 FIFA World Cup.)	multi-purpose	
Chicago Stars FC	Evanston, Illinois	Martin Stadium	12,023	12,023	artificial turf	multi-purpose	Martin Stadium during a 2024 collegiate game of American football
Denver Summit FC	Centennial, Colorado	Centennial Stadium (Note: Denver Summit FC played its inaugural home match at Empower Field at Mile High in Denver; it also played four home matches at Dick's Sporting Goods Park in Commerce City.. Some games were moved to Dick's Sporting Goods Park midseason due to construction delays at Centennial Stadium.)	12,000	12,000	artificial turf	soccer-specific	
Gotham FC	Harrison, New Jersey	Sports Illustrated Stadium	25,000	25,000	Kentucky bluegrass	soccer-specific	
Houston Dash	Houston, Texas	Shell Energy Stadium	22,039	7,000 (Note: Shell Energy Stadium has a capacity of 22,039, but capacity for Dash games are restricted to 7,000.)	Bermuda grass	soccer-specific	
Kansas City Current	Kansas City, Missouri	CPKC Stadium	11,500	11,500	Grass	soccer-specific	
North Carolina Courage	Cary, North Carolina	WakeMed Soccer Park	10,000	10,000	Grass	soccer-specific	
Orlando Pride	Orlando, Florida	Inter.co Stadium	25,500	25,500	Grass	soccer-specific	
Portland Thorns FC	Portland, Oregon	Providence Park	25,218	25,218	FieldTurf	soccer-specific	
Racing Louisville FC	Louisville, Kentucky	Lynn Family Stadium	15,304	11,700 (Note: Seated capacity; 15,304 with standing room.)	Bermuda grass	soccer-specific	
San Diego Wave FC	San Diego, California	Snapdragon Stadium	35,000	35,000	Bermuda grass	multi-purpose	
Seattle Reign FC	Seattle, Washington	Lumen Field	68,740	10,000 (Note: Lumen Field has a capacity of 68,740; standard configuration for Reign games seats 10,000 but can expand based on demand for individual games.)	FieldTurf	multi-purpose	
Utah Royals	Sandy, Utah	America First Field (Note: During the Royals' original stint in the league from 2018–2020, the team played in this facility, then known as Rio Tinto Stadium.)	20,213	20,213	Kentucky bluegrass	soccer-specific	
Washington Spirit	Washington, D.C.	Audi Field	20,000	20,000	Bermuda grass	soccer-specific	

== Future stadiums ==
2027: Boston Legacy FC will play its full season at Centreville Bank Stadium in Pawtucket, Rhode Island, after playing seven games there in 2026. The team will then plan to move to its permanent stadium in Boston for 2028.

2028: Boston Legacy FC plans to move into its permanent home at a renovated White Stadium in Franklin Park, Boston. The venue is expected to seat around 11,000 fans and is projected to open in 2028 following delays relating to construction and legal disputes.

2028: Atlanta City FC plans to play at Mercedes-Benz Stadium, while the Columbus NWSL team plans to play at ScottsMiracle-Gro Field.

2028: Denver Summit FC plans to move into a purpose-built, roughly 14,500-seat stadium at Santa Fe Yards in Denver's Baker neighborhood, following two seasons at the temporary Centennial Stadium.

2028: Gotham FC will relocate to Etihad Park in Queens, New York, leaving their current home, Sports Illustrated Stadium in Harrison, New Jersey.

== Secondary and former stadiums ==
=== Angel City FC ===
- Titan Stadium (2022 – all Challenge Cup home matches)
- Dignity Health Sports Park (one home match in 2027)

=== Boston Breakers ===
- Dilboy Stadium (2013 – all home matches)
- Harvard Stadium (2014 – all home matches)
- Jordan Field (2015–2017 – all home matches)

=== Boston Legacy FC ===
- Gillette Stadium (2026 – eight home matches during inaugural season, while White Stadium was under renovation)
- Centreville Bank Stadium (2026 – seven home matches during inaugural season, while White Stadium was under renovation and during scheduling conflicts at Gillette Stadium, most notably the 2026 FIFA World Cup)

=== Chicago Stars FC ===
- SeatGeek Stadium (2009–2010; 2016–2025)
- Sports Complex at Benedictine University (2013–2015, most home matches. In 2014 and 2015 a total of three regular-season matches and one playoff match were held at Toyota Park, now known as SeatGeek Stadium.)
- Soldier Field (one home match in 2022)

=== Denver Summit FC ===
- Empower Field at Mile High (2026 – home opener, "The Kickoff," played March 28, setting a league attendance record)
- Dick's Sporting Goods Park (2026 – spring home matches, before the opening of Centennial Stadium)

=== Gotham FC ===
- Yurcak Field (as Sky Blue FC: 2013–2019 – all home matches except two 2019 matches at Red Bull Arena)
- MSU Soccer Park (2021 – all Challenge Cup home matches)
- Subaru Park (one home match each in 2021 and 2022)

=== FC Kansas City ===
- Shawnee Mission District Stadium (2013 – all home matches)
- Durwood Soccer Stadium (2014 – all home matches)
- Swope Soccer Village (2015–2017 – all home matches)

=== Kansas City Current ===
- Legends Field (2021 – all home matches except one at Children's Mercy Park)

=== Orlando Pride ===
- Camping World Stadium (2016 – all home matches)

=== San Diego Wave FC ===
- Torero Stadium (2022 – first 9 home matches, before opening of Snapdragon Stadium)

=== Seattle Reign FC ===
- Starfire Sports Complex (as Seattle Reign FC: 2013 – all home matches; 2014 – NWSL final)
- Memorial Stadium (as Seattle Reign FC: 2014–2018 – all home matches except 2014 NWSL final)
- Cheney Stadium (as Reign FC: 2019; as OL Reign 2020–2021 – all home matches except one 2021 match at Lumen Field)
- One Spokane Stadium (2026 – early-season matches due to 2026 FIFA World Cup preparations at Lumen Field)

=== Utah Royals ===
- Rio Tinto Stadium (as Utah Royals FC: 2018–2020 – all home matches). Also hosted semifinals and final of 2020 Challenge Cup.

=== Washington Spirit ===
- Maryland SoccerPlex (2013–2020 – all home matches through 2017; primary home in 2018 and 2019; originally scheduled matches in 2020 canceled due to COVID-19)
- Segra Field (2020–2022 – select home matches as one of two primary home stadiums alongside Audi Field)

=== Western New York Flash ===
- Rochester Rhinos Stadium (2013–2016 – all home matches)
- Frontier Field (2016 – one match vs. Seattle Reign FC)

=== 2020 NWSL Challenge Cup ===
- Zions Bank Stadium (2020 – all Challenge Cup matches except semifinals and final)

== See also ==
- National Women's Soccer League attendance
- NWSL expansion
- List of soccer stadiums in the United States
