= Ainsley McCammon =

American soccer player (born 2007)

- McCammon with the Seattle Reign in 2026

Personal information
- Full name: Ainsley Layna McCammon
- Date of birth: August 16, 2007 (age 19)
- Height: 5 ft 9 in (1.75 m)
- Position: Midfielder

Team information
- Current team: Seattle Reign
- Number: 16

Youth career
- Solar SC

Senior career*
Years	Team	Apps	(Gls)
2024–	Seattle Reign	42	(1)

International career^{‡}
2022	United States U-15		
2024	United States U-17	11	(2)
2025–	United States U-20	9	(2)
Medal record
Women's soccer
FIFA U-17 Women's World Cup
Bronze medal – third place	Dominican Republic 2024
- * Club domestic league appearances and goals as of 16:35, November 8, 2026 (UTC) ‡ National team caps and goals as of September 16, 2026

Ainsley Layna McCammon (born August 16, 2007) is an American professional soccer player who plays as a midfielder for Seattle Reign FC of the National Women's Soccer League (NWSL). She signed with the Reign at age 16 in 2024. She captained the United States to third place at the 2024 FIFA U-17 Women's World Cup.

== Early life ==
McCammon grew up in Bedford, Texas. She played club soccer for Solar SC, leading the team to the ECNL national title in 2023. She was named ECNL All-American three times and was the ECNL Texas Conference U17 Player of the Year in 2024. In April 2024, when she was 16, she signed an endorsement deal with Nike. Before giving up her eligibility, she was committed to play college soccer for the Virginia Cavaliers.

== Club career ==
Seattle Reign FC announced on July 19, 2024, that they had signed McCammon to her first professional contract through the NWSL's Under-18 Entry Mechanism on a four-and-a-half-year deal. Unveiled alongside defender Jordyn Bugg, she became the youngest player in club history and seventh-youngest in league history at 16 years and 335 days old.

McCammon made her professional debut the same day as a 90th-minute substitute for Olivia Athens in a 2–1 win over the Utah Royals in the NWSL x Liga MX Femenil Summer Cup. Two weeks later, she made her first professional start in the same competition, playing 63 minutes in a 1–0 loss to rivals Portland Thorns. On September 6, she made her NWSL regular-season debut in a 3–2 victory over Angel City FC, coming on as a stoppage-time sub for Ji So-yun. On October 5, she made her first regular-season start in a 1–0 loss to the same opponents, the midfielder's last appearance of the year before departing to the 2024 FIFA U-17 Women's World Cup.

On April 12, 2025, McCammon made her first appearance of the season starting in a 1–0 defeat to defending champions Orlando Pride. She gradually gained playing time and became a regular for the Reign by the end of the season. On October 17, she scored her first professional goal in their playoff-clinching home finale, heading a cross from Maddie Dahlien to open the scoring in 2–1 win over the Utah Royals. Two weeks later, she started in her playoff debut but lost 2–0 to the Orlando Pride in the quarterfinals.

McCammon celebrating with the Seattle Reign in 2026

On March 15, 2026, McCammon began the season starting in a 2–1 win over the Orlando Pride. On July 26, she set up both goals in a 2–0 victory over the San Diego Wave, surpassing Trinity Rodman to become the youngest NWSL player with multiple assists in a match. She earned a nomination for NWSL Player of the Week and was praised by head coach Laura Harvey for her distribution, leadership, and development.

== International career ==
McCammon was part of the United States under-15 team that won the 2022 CONCACAF Girls' U-15 Championship. She captained the under-17 team to win the 2024 CONCACAF Women's U-17 Championship. She remained captain at the 2024 FIFA U-17 Women's World Cup, where she helped lead the United States to third place, its best result since 2008. She scored the second goal in the 3–0 win over England in the third-place match. She was called up by Emma Hayes into Futures Camp, practicing concurrently with the senior national team, in January 2025.

McCammon was named to the under-20 roster for the 2026 FIFA U-20 Women's World Cup, scoring the opener in a 2–2 group draw with Japan. In the round of 16, she scored the 1–1 equalizer against Brazil and converted a penalty in the resulting shootout loss.

== Career statistics ==
=== Club ===
As of November 7, 2025

Appearances and goals by club, season and competition
Club	Season	League			Playoffs		Other		Total	
Club	Season	Division	Apps	Goals	Apps	Goals	Apps	Goals	Apps	Goals
Seattle Reign FC	2024	NWSL	2	0	—		2 (Note: Appearances in the NWSL x Liga MX Femenil Summer Cup)	0	4	0
Seattle Reign FC	2025	NWSL	16	1	1	0	—		17	1
Career total			18	1	1	0	2	0	21	1

== Honors ==
United States U-15

- CONCACAF Girls' U-15 Championship: 2022

United States U-17

- CONCACAF Women's U-17 Championship: 2024
- FIFA U-17 Women's World Cup bronze medal: 2024
