= 2021 The Women's Cup =

Tournament details
- Host country: United States
- City: Louisville, Kentucky
- Dates: August 18, 2021– August 21, 2021
- Teams: 4 (from 2 confederations)
- Venue: 1 (in 1 host city)

Final positions
- Champions: (United States) Racing Louisville FC (1st title)
- Runners-up: (Germany) Bayern Munich
- Third place: (France) Paris Saint-Germain
- Fourth place: (United States) Chicago Red Stars

Tournament statistics
- Matches played: 4
- Goals scored: 11 (2.75 per match)
- Top scorer: Marie-Antoinette Katoto (2)
- All statistics correct as of August 10, 2022.

The 2021 The Women's Cup was the inaugural edition of a friendly invitational tournament of women's association football matches. It took place in Lynn Family Stadium of Louisville, Kentucky, United States, from August 18 to 21, 2021.

Hosts Racing Louisville FC won the tournament, defeating Bayern Munich on penalties. Paris Saint-Germain defeated Chicago Red Stars 1–0 in the third-place match.

== Teams ==
Nation	Team
United States	Racing Louisville FC (hosts)
France	Paris Saint-Germain
Germany	Bayern Munich
United States	Chicago Red Stars

== Venue ==
Louisville, Kentucky	2021 The Women's Cup (the United States)
Lynn Family Stadium	2021 The Women's Cup (the United States)
Capacity: 11,700	2021 The Women's Cup (the United States)

== Broadcasting ==
In 2021, The Women's Cup was streamed exclusively on Paramount+ in the United States.

== Bracket ==
Semi-finals
August 18 – Louisville
(Germany) Bayern (p)	2 (5)
(France) Paris Saint-Germain	2 (4)
August 18 – Louisville
(United States) Racing Louisville FC (p)	1 (5)
(United States) Chicago Red Stars	1 (4)

Final
August 21 – Louisville
(United States) Racing Louisville FC (p)	2 (7)
(Germany) Bayern	2 (6)
Third place play-off
August 21 – Louisville
(United States) Chicago Red Stars	0
(France) Paris Saint-Germain	1

== Matches ==
The initial match of the tournament, a semi-final match featuring the Chicago Red Stars and Racing Louisville FC, was also teams' scheduled regular season National Women's Soccer League match, and the regulation result was represented in the league standings. That match's result was a draw, so to resolve the result for The Women's Cup, the teams engaged in a post-match penalty shootout that was not counted as part of the NWSL match.

=== Semi-finals ===
August 18, 2021
17:00 EDT
Semi-final

Paris Saint-Germain (France)	2–2	(Germany) Bayern Munich
Katoto 19' (Baltimore); Hamraoui 57' (Baltimore)	Report; Highlights	Dallmann 43' (Kumagai); Schüller 45+1'
Penalties
Bachmann (penalty missed); Diani (penalty scored); Karchaoui (penalty scored); Hurtré (penalty scored); Dudek (penalty scored); Khelifi (penalty missed)	4–5	(penalty scored) Vilhjálmsdóttir; (penalty scored) Simon; (penalty scored) Magull; (penalty missed) Beerensteyn; (penalty scored) Damnjanović; (penalty scored) Glas

Lynn Family Stadium, Louisville, Kentucky
Referee: Danielle Chesky

August 18, 2021
19:30 EDT
Semi-final

Racing Louisville FC (United States)	1–1	(United States) Chicago Red Stars
Salmon 10', (yellow card) 57'; Riehl (yellow card) 65'; Nagasato (yellow card) 90'	Report; CHI Report; LOU Report; Report; Report	Watt 57'; Bench (yellow card) 82'
Penalties
Nagasato (penalty scored); Bonner (penalty missed); McCaskill (penalty scored); Miramontez (penalty scored); Milliet (penalty scored); McClure (penalty scored)	5–4	(penalty missed) Pugh; (penalty scored) Davidson; (penalty scored) Woldmoe; (penalty scored) Stanton; (penalty scored) Watt; (penalty missed) Hill

Lynn Family Stadium, Louisville, Kentucky
Attendance: 7,310

=== Third place play-off ===
August 21, 2021
15:00 CDT
Third place play-off

Chicago Red Stars (United States)	0–1	(France) Paris Saint-Germain
	Report; Report	Katoto 33'

Lynn Family Stadium, Louisville, Kentucky

=== Championship ===
August 21, 2021
18:00 EDT
Championship match

Racing Louisville FC (United States)	2–2	(Germany) FC Bayern Munich
Baucom 54'; McCaskill (yellow card) 74'; Nagasato 85'	Report; Report	Bühl 49'; Bonner 90+5' (o.g.)
Penalties
Nagasato (penalty missed); Salmon (penalty scored); McCaskill (penalty scored); Miramontez (penalty missed); Baucom (penalty missed); Olofsson (penalty scored); Bonner (penalty missed); Milliet (penalty scored); Riehl (penalty scored); Martin (penalty scored); Lund (penalty scored)	7–6	(penalty scored) Lohmann; (penalty missed) Gwinn; (penalty scored) Asseyi; (penalty missed) Dallmann; (penalty missed) Damnjanović; (penalty scored) Kumagai; (penalty missed) Zadrazil; (penalty scored) Bühl; (penalty scored) Rall; (penalty scored) Wenninger; (penalty missed) Benkarth

Lynn Family Stadium, Louisville, Kentucky
Attendance: 7,813

== See also ==
- National Women's Soccer League (United States)
- Frauen-Bundesliga (Germany)
- Division 1 (France)
