= Maddie Mercado =

American soccer player (born 2001)

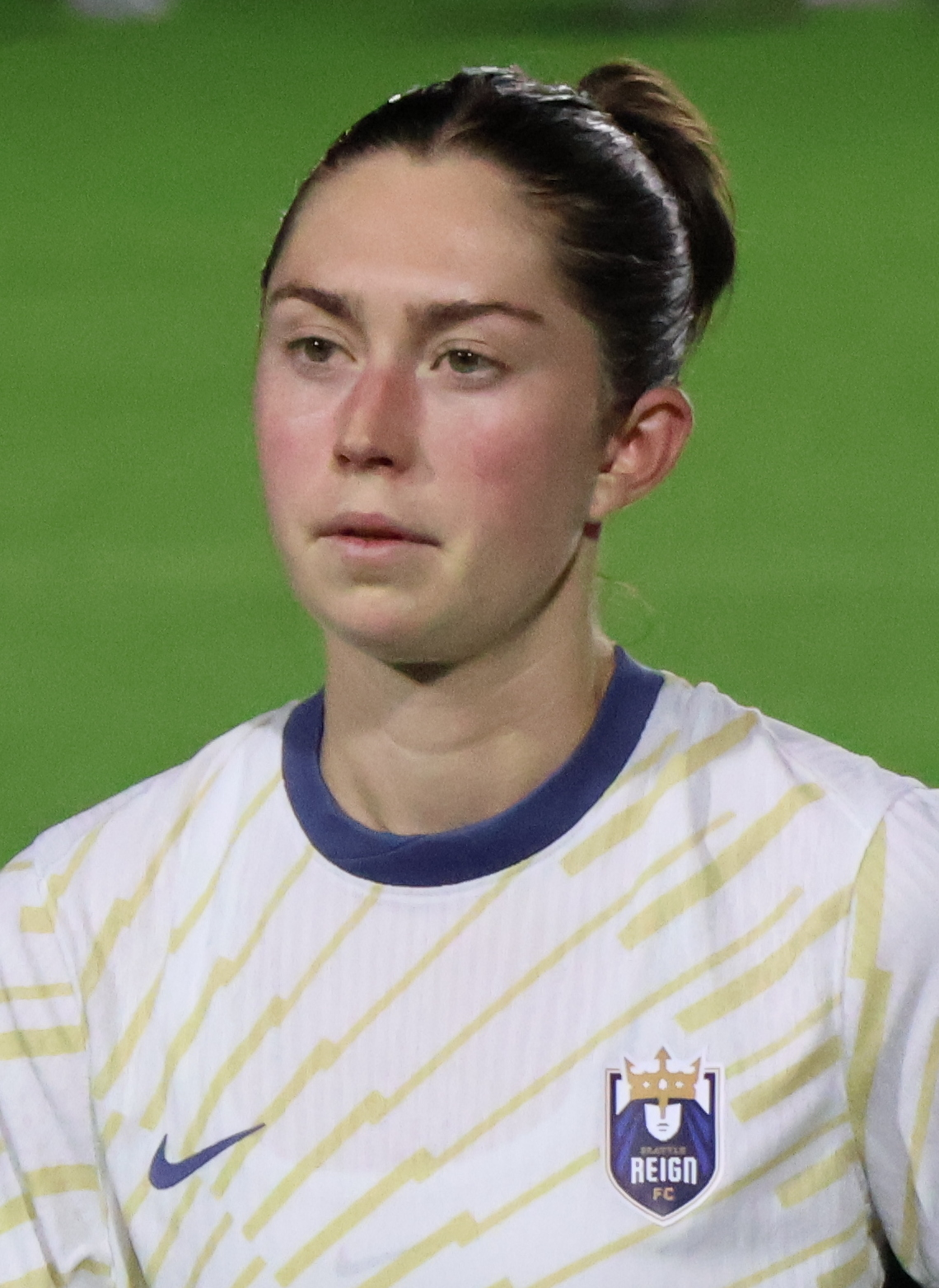
- Mercado with the Seattle Reign in 2026

Personal information
- Full name: Madison Mercado
- Date of birth: April 1, 2001 (age 25)
- Height: 5 ft 8 in (1.73 m)
- Positions: Forward; midfielder

Team information
- Current team: Seattle Reign
- Number: 2

Youth career
- San Diego Surf

College career
Years	Team	Apps	(Gls)
2019–2023	Notre Dame Fighting Irish	94	(26)

Senior career*
Years	Team	Apps	(Gls)
2024–	Seattle Reign	49	(11)
2025	→ Carolina Ascent (loan)	6	(4)

International career^{‡}
2016	United States U-15		
2017	United States U-17	3	(0)
2020	United States U-19	2	(0)
- * Club domestic league appearances and goals as of 16:36, November 8, 2026 (UTC) ‡ National team caps and goals as of 17:26, November 8, 2025 (UTC)

Madison Mercado (born April 1, 2001) is an American professional soccer player who plays as a forward or midfielder for Seattle Reign FC of the National Women's Soccer League (NWSL). She played college soccer for the Notre Dame Fighting Irish and was selected by the Reign in the second round of the 2024 NWSL Draft.

== Early life ==
Mercado was raised in San Diego, California. Her parents both played tennis collegiately, with her mother progressing to a professional career. Mercado attended Cathedral Catholic High School, where she played soccer and helped the team become 2016 CIF Southern California High School Champions. She also played youth soccer for San Diego Surf SC in the ECNL. In 2017, Mercado was named the 2017 Western Conference Player of the Year.

== College career ==
Mercado played collegiately for the Notre Dame Fighting Irish. Her first goal with Notre Dame occurred in her sophomore year, on March 20, 2020. She had a breakout season in 2022, recording a career-high 10 goals and 4 assists. She played in all 23 of the Fighting Irish's matches as the team advanced to the quarterfinals of the NCAA tournament for the first time in a decade. On the way to the quarterfinals, Mercado scored in the team's opening round victory over Omaha and in their round-of-16 match versus TCU. Mercado finished her final collegiate season leading the team in goals and points. She was also named to the All-ACC second team.

== Club career ==
=== Seattle Reign ===
On January 12, 2024, Mercado was selected by Seattle Reign FC as the 27th overall pick of the 2024 NWSL Draft. She signed a one-year contract with the Reign on March 13, 2024. On May 8, Mercado made her professional debut as a second-half substitute in a 0–0 draw with the Kansas City Current. Mercado's next minutes with the Reign occurred during the 2024 NWSL x Liga MX Femenil Summer Cup, where she started the club's first two games. In the second match, an eventual loss to Club Tijuana, Mercado netted her first professional goal. She scored her first NWSL regular season goal in the Reign's final match of 2024, providing the team's second goal in a 3–2 defeat at the hands of the Orlando Pride.

Mercado recorded her first regular season assist and starting appearance on March 25, 2025. Her assist to Jess Fishlock was an NWSL Assist of the Week nominee. On August 20, Mercado signed a one-year extension through 2026 with a player option for another season. She was then immediately loaned out to USL Super League club Carolina Ascent FC through the end of 2025.

==== Carolina Ascent (loan) ====
Mercado made her first appearance and scored her first goal for the Carolina Ascent in the club's season-opening draw with Fort Lauderdale United FC on August 30, 2025. Her strike, which found the back of the net 43 seconds into the match, became the fastest goal scored in USL Super League history. In her second club match, Mercado made an impact at the opposite end of the game, dribbling 40 yards before scoring the stoppage-time equalizer in a 2–2 draw with the Tampa Bay Sun. She went on to score again against expansion team Sporting Club Jacksonville on September 13, setting a streak of 3 goals scored in her first 3 matches with Carolina. Mercado's quick start at the Ascent earned her a spot on the Super League's September Team of the Month bench. She was recalled from her loan on October 8, 2025, after starting six matches and scoring four goals for Carolina.

==== Return to Seattle ====
Upon returning to the Reign, Mercado started 2 out of Seattle's 3 remaining 2025 regular season matches. She also started in the Reign's first-round playoff match against the Orlando Pride on November 7. During the match, Mercado had multiple chances to score, but neither she nor any of her teammates were able to penetrate through the Pride defense as Orlando won, 2–0.

Mercado had a breakout season in 2026. At the start of the year, she was shifted to a role higher up the field by head coach Laura Harvey. In March 2026, she scored in back-to-back matches, first a header against the Kansas City Current on March 25, and then a low shot against Racing Louisville FC three days later. From July to September, she recorded a ten-match period in which she recorded at least one goal contribution in seven of the games. On September 8, Mercado exercised her player contract option to keep her in Seattle through 2027.

== International career ==
Mercado has represented the United States at youth level from U-14 to U-19 age groups. In 2016, Mercado helped the United States girls' national under-15 soccer team win the 2016 CONCACAF Girls' U-15 Championship, scoring two goals in the team's quarterfinal match. As part of the United States women's national under-19 soccer team, Mercado was named to the squad for the 2020 La Manga Tournament. She was an unused substitute for the first match but started in both of the United States' remaining fixtures against the Netherlands and England.

== Personal life ==
Mercado's older brother, Michael Mercado, is a professional baseball pitcher. He was selected by the Tampa Bay Rays in the 2017 MLB draft and plays for the Philadelphia Phillies.

== Career statistics ==
=== Club ===
As of March 29, 2026

Appearances and goals by club, season and competition
Club	Season	League			Cup (Note: Includes the NWSL Challenge Cup)		Playoffs (Note: Includes NWSL playoffs)		Other		Total	
Club	Season	Division	Apps	Goals	Apps	Goals	Apps	Goals	Apps	Goals	Apps	Goals
Seattle Reign FC	2024	NWSL	5	1	—		—		3 (Note: Appearances in the NWSL x Liga MX Femenil Summer Cup)	1	8	2
Seattle Reign FC	2025	NWSL	14	0	—		1	0	—		15	0
Seattle Reign FC	2026	NWSL	4	2	—		—		—		4	2
Seattle Reign FC	Total		23	3	0	0	1	0	3	1	27	4
Carolina Ascent FC (loan)	2025–26	USL Super League	6	4	—		—		—		6	4
Career total			29	7	0	0	1	0	3	1	33	8

== Honors and awards ==
Individual

- Second-team All-ACC: 2023
- Third-team All-ACC: 2022
- ACC tournament all-tournament team: 2023
