= Olivia Athens =

American soccer player (born 1998)

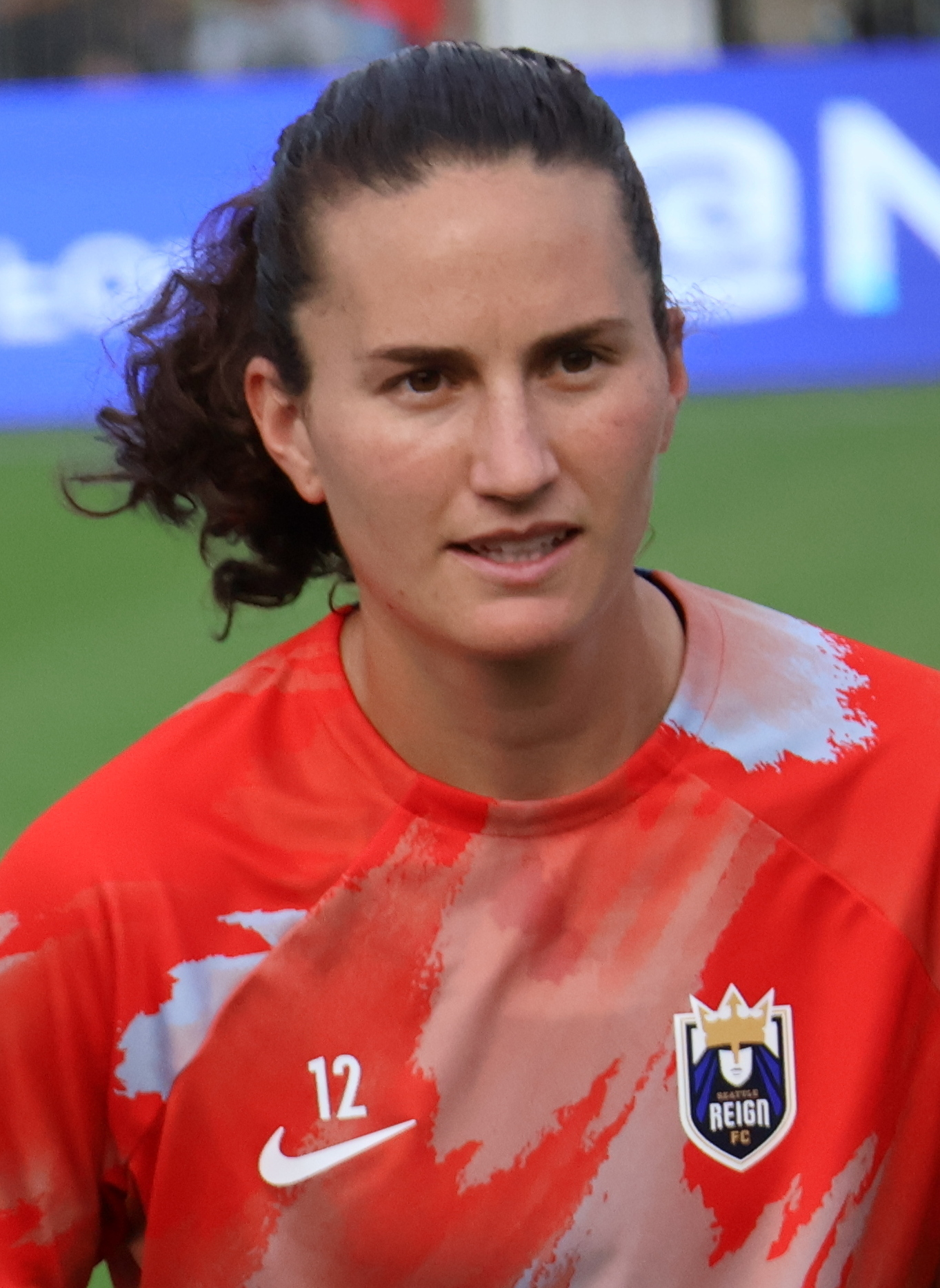
- Athens with the Seattle Reign in 2024

Personal information
- Full name: Olivia Marie Athens
- Date of birth: August 1, 1998 (age 28)
- Place of birth: Stanford, California, United States
- Height: 5 ft 7 in (1.70 m)
- Position: Midfielder

College career
Years	Team	Apps	(Gls)
2017–2021	UCLA Bruins	85	(12)

Senior career*
Years	Team	Apps	(Gls)
2019	LA Galaxy OC		
2022–2024	Seattle Reign	34	(2)

International career
2016	United States U18		
- * Club domestic league appearances and goals as of 16:30, February 15, 2026 (UTC)

Olivia Marie Athens (born August 1, 1998) is an American former professional soccer player who played as a midfielder. She played college soccer for the UCLA Bruins before spending three seasons professionally with Seattle Reign FC of the National Women's Soccer League (NWSL), contributing to one NWSL Shield title.

== Early life ==
Born in Stanford, California and raised in nearby Atherton, Athens attended Sacred Heart Prep where she played soccer for two seasons. During her time with the varsity team, she scored 33 goals and provided 30 assists. She earned first-team all-league honors the first year and was named the league's Forward of the Year the second. She played club soccer for PSV Union FC 98G and won the 2014 Surf Cup.

== College career ==
Athens attended UCLA, where she played for the UCLA Bruins from 2017 to 2021. During her freshman season in 2017, Athens was a started in 12 of the 23 games she played, including six 2017 NCAA College Cup games. Her first goal was a game-winner against Princeton in the NCAA College Cup quarterfinals. She was named to Top Drawer Soccer's Team of the Week in late November. The Bruins advanced to the final of the College Cup where they were defeated 3–2 by the Stanford Cardinal.

During the 2018 season, Athens ranked third on the Bruins in scoring with four goals, including two game-winners and 16 points. Her eight assists ranked second on the team. She was a starting midfielder in 20 starts of the 22 games she played, including all four 2018 NCAA College Cup games where the team advanced to the quarterfinals and were defeated in a penalty kick shootout by the North Carolina Tar Heels. Athens earned honorable mention Pac-12 All-Academic honors.

In 2019, Athens's season was cut short by a fractured leg injury. Returning in 2020, Athens was a starting midfield in 16 of the 17 games she played, scored four goals and provided eight assists for a total of 16 points. She was named Pac-12 Offensive Player of the Week and earned CoSIDA Academic All-District first-team honors. In her final season with the Bruins, Athens was a starter in all 19 games she played. Her four goals and ten points ranked third on the team. Both of the assists she provided were on game-winning goals. Athens finished her collegiate career with 12 goals and 15 assists in the 85 games she played.

== Club career ==
Seattle Reign FC signed Athens in January 2022 ahead of the 2022 season. She made her professional debut for the club in a match against Angel City FC on March 26, 2022. On July 10, 2022, she scored her first professional goal against Portland Thorns FC in her first professional start. Athens finished her rookie season with eight appearances and one goal. The Reign finished in first place and won the NWSL Shield and advanced to the NWSL Playoffs. After playing one more season with Seattle, Athens' contract expired with the Reign and she was rendered a free agent.

Athens soon pursued further options, and in February 2025, she was revealed to be a preseason trialist with NJ/NY Gotham FC. However, she did not make the team's final roster.

== Honors ==
Seattle Reign FC

- NWSL Shield: 2022
- The Women's Cup: 2022
