= National Women's Soccer League attendance =

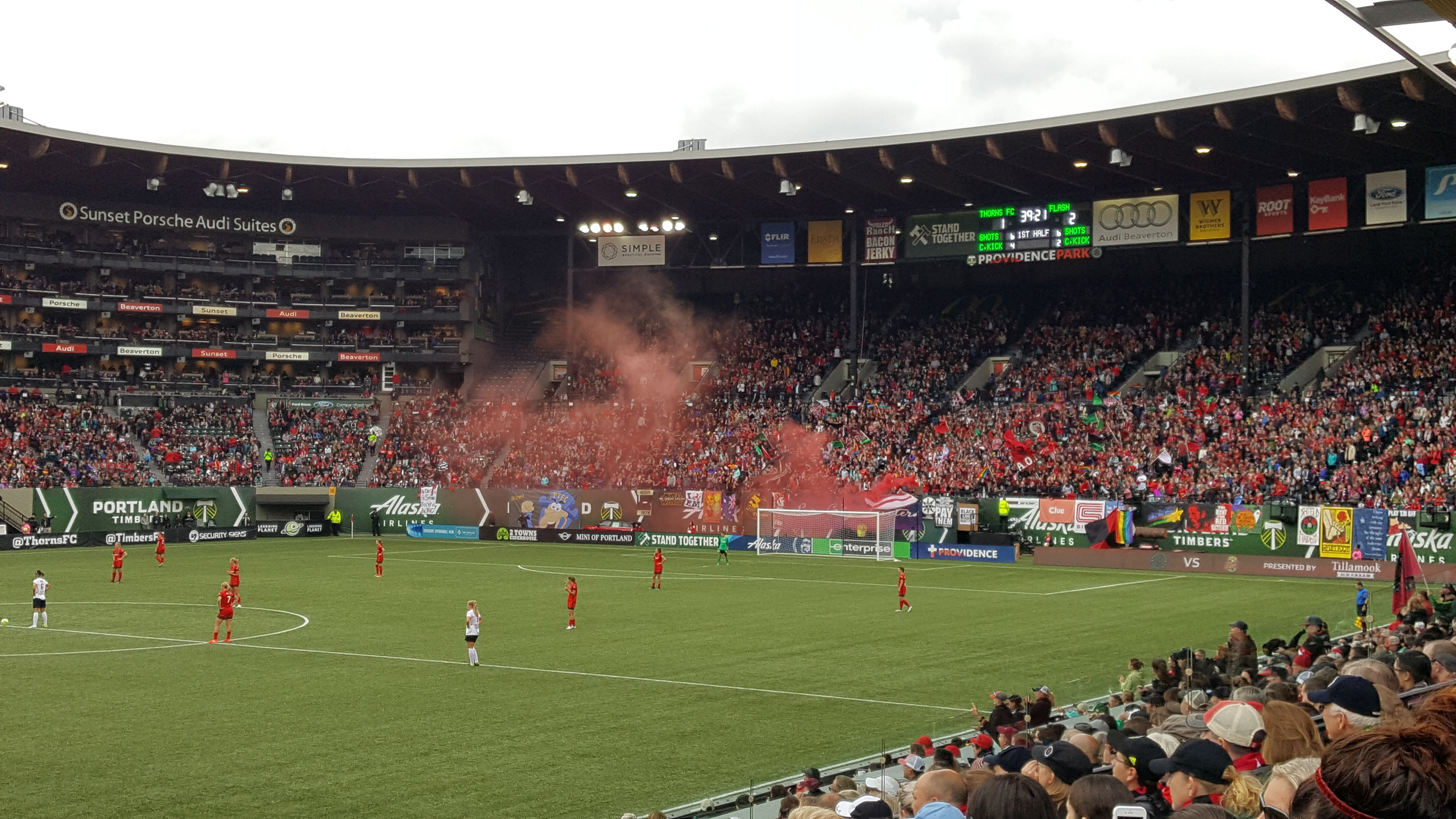
The Portland Thorns' average regular-season attendance in 2019 was 20,098 fans, the first year a team broke the 20,000 mark.

The National Women's Soccer League (NWSL) is a top-tier professional women's soccer league in the United States. It has the second highest average attendance of professional women's sports leagues in the United States, below the Women's National Basketball Association and ahead of Professional Women's Hockey League. During the 2024 season, the NWSL reached a total attendance of over 2 million spectators for the first time in the league's history. The single-match attendance record of 63,004 spectators was set by the Denver Summit during their inaugural home opener, facing the Washington Spirit on March 28, 2026, at Empower Field in Denver.

== Total regular season attendance ==
=== Attendance by year ===
| Season | Total gate | Games | Average | Change | High avg. (Note: Green shading indicates record highs; red shading indicates record lows.) | High avg. team | Low avg. | Low avg. team | Ref. |
|---|---|---|---|---|---|---|---|---|---|
| 2013 | 375,763 | 88 | 4,270 | — | 13,320 | Portland Thorns FC | 1,664 | Sky Blue FC | |
| 2014 | 446,820 | 108 | 4,137 | −3.1% | 13,362 | Portland Thorns FC | 1,640 | Sky Blue FC | |
| 2015 | 454,100 | 90 | 5,046 | +21.9% | 15,639 | Portland Thorns FC | 2,189 | Sky Blue FC | |
| 2016 | 555,775 | 100 | 5,558 | +10.1% | 16,945 | Portland Thorns FC | 2,162 | Sky Blue FC | |
| 2017 | 609,960 | 120 | 5,083 | −8.5% | 17,653 | Portland Thorns FC | 1,788 | FC Kansas City | |
| 2018 | 650,564 | 108 | 6,024 | +18.5% | 16,959 | Portland Thorns FC | 2,531 | Sky Blue FC | |
| 2019 | 792,409 | 108 | 7,337 | +21.8% | 20,098 | Portland Thorns FC | 3,338 | Sky Blue FC | |
| 2020 | regular season canceled due to COVID-19 pandemic | | | | | | | | |
| 2021 | 592,074 | 116 (Note: Portland Thorns FC did not report two matches during a period of capacity restrictions related to COVID-19 pandemic safety policies: versus Louisville on June 5, and Kansas City on June 20. Two further matches (Washington at Portland on September 4, and OL Reign at Washington on September 12) were declared by the league to be forfeits against Washington due to violations of the league's COVID safety protocols and were not played.) | 5,528 | −24.7% | 14,391 | Portland Thorns FC | 3,291 | Chicago Red Stars | |
| 2022 | 1,042,063 | 132 | 7,894 | +42.8% | 19,105 | Angel City FC | 4,385 | Orlando Pride | |
| 2023 | 1,366,581 | 131 (Note: The April 28, 2023, match between [Houston Dash|Houston] and [North Carolina Courage|North Carolina] was abandoned at the 52nd minute before attendance could be reported.) | 10,432 | +32.2% | 20,718 | San Diego Wave FC | 4,848 | Chicago Red Stars | |
| 2024 | 2,044,848 | 182 | 11,235 | +14.1% | 19,575 | San Diego Wave FC | 6,194 | Houston Dash | |
| 2025 | 1,926,090 | 182 | 10,669 | −5.0% | 18,173 | Portland Thorns FC | 5,521 | Racing Louisville | |
| 2026 | 2,643,616 | 240 | 11,015 | +3.2% | 19,073 | Portland Thorns FC | 4,552 | Chicago Stars FC | |

=== Attendance by team ===
| Season | BAY | BOS (Note: Includes Boston Breakers (2013–2017) and Boston Legacy FC (2026–).) | CHI | DEN | HOU | KC (Note: Includes FC Kansas City (2013–2017) and Kansas City Current (2021–).) | LA | LOU | NC | NJY | ORL | POR | SEA | SD | UTA (Note: Includes the distinct teams Utah Royals FC (2018–2020) and Utah Royals (2024–).) | WAS | WNY |
|---|---|---|---|---|---|---|---|---|---|---|---|---|---|---|---|---|---|
| 2013 | — | 2,427 | 1,711 | — | — | 4,626 | — | — | — | 1,666 | — | 13,320 | 2,306 | — | — | 3,625 | 4,485 |
| 2014 | — | 2,437 | 2,949 | — | 4,650 | 2,018 | — | — | — | 1,656 | — | 13,362 | 3,666 | — | — | 3,335 | 3,177 |
| 2015 | — | 2,863 | 4,210 | — | 6,413 | 3,091 | — | — | — | 2,189 | -- | 15,639 | 4,060 | — | — | 4,087 | 2,860 |
| 2016 | — | 3,570 | 3,005 | — | 5,696 | 3,162 | — | — | -- | 2,162 | 8,785 | 16,945 | 4,602 | — | -- | 3,782 | 3,868 |
| 2017 | — | 2,896 | 3,196 | — | 4,578 | 1,788 | — | — | 4,389 | 2,613 | 6,186 | 17,653 | 4,037 | — | — | 3,491 | — |
| 2018 | — | — | 4,368 | — | 3,896 | -- | — | — | 5,129 | 2,531 | 4,837 | 16,959 | 3,824 | — | 9,466 | 3,892 | — |
| 2019 | — | — | 5,451 | — | 3,615 | -- | — | — | 5,875 | 3,338 | 5,565 | 20,098 | 5,213 | — | 10,774 | 6,105 | — |
| 2020 | Regular season cancelled due to COVID-19 pandemic. | | | | | | | | | | | | | | | | |
| 2021 | — | — | 3,291 | — | 3,681 | 4,861 | — | 6,610 | 5,036 | 5,150 | 3,931 | 14,391 | 5,433 | — | — | 4,096 | — |
| 2022 | — | — | 5,863 | — | 5,644 | 7,657 | 19,105 | 6,048 | 4,545 | 4,415 | 4,385 | 15,543 | 6,844 | 8,729 | — | 5,955 | — |
| 2023 | — | — | 4,848 | — | 5,857 | 11,353 | 19,756 | 5,999 | 5,384 | 6,293 | 6,005 | 18,918 | 13,610 | 20,718 | — | 10,876 | — |
| 2024 | 13,617 | — | 7,156 | — | 6,194 | 11,500 | 19,313 | 6,208 | 6,362 | 8,589 | 8,340 | 18,725 | 8,503 | 19,575 | 10,304 | 13,937 | — |
| 2025 | 14,823 | — | 5,574 | — | 6,041 | 11,500 | 16,257 | 5,521 | 7,684 | 8,892 | 9,623 | 18,173 | 7,864 | 13,427 | 8,727 | 15,259 | — |
| 2026 | 12,126 | 10,809 | 4,552 | 16,635 | 6,917 | 11,533 | 15,851 | 5,454 | 8,364 | 10,943 | 8,249 | 19,073 | 7,863 | 12,284 | 9,143 | 16,260 | — |

== Attendance records ==
=== Regular season ===
As of As of July 16, 2026

| Rank | Home team | Score | Away team | Attendance | Venue | Location | Date | Ref. |
|---|---|---|---|---|---|---|---|---|
| 1 | Denver Summit | 0–0 | Washington Spirit | 63,004 | Empower Field | Denver, Colorado | March 28, 2026 | |
| 2 | Gotham FC | 1–0 | Washington Spirit | 42,175† | Citi Field | New York, New York | July 15, 2026 | |
| — | OL Reign | 0–2 | Portland Thorns | 42,054* | Lumen Field | Seattle, Washington | June 3, 2023 | |
| 3 | Bay FC | 2–3 | Washington Spirit | 40,091 | Oracle Park | San Francisco, California | August 23, 2025 | |
| 4 | Chicago Red Stars | 1–2 | Bay FC | 35,038 | Wrigley Field | Chicago, Illinois | June 8, 2024 | |
| 5 | OL Reign | 0–0 | Washington Spirit | 34,130 | Lumen Field | Seattle, Washington | October 6, 2023 | |
| 6 | San Diego Wave | 1–2 | Kansas City Current | 32,066 | Snapdragon Stadium | San Diego, California | March 23, 2024 | |
| 7 | San Diego Wave | 1–0 | Angel City FC | 32,000† | Snapdragon Stadium | San Diego, California | September 17, 2022 | |
| 8 | San Diego Wave | 3–2 | Chicago Red Stars | 30,854 | Snapdragon Stadium | San Diego, California | March 25, 2023 | |
| 9 | San Diego Wave | 2–0 | Racing Louisville | 30,312 | Snapdragon Stadium | San Diego, California | October 15, 2023 | |
| 10 | Boston Legacy | 0–1 | Gotham FC | 30,207 | Gillette Stadium | Foxborough, Massachusetts | March 14, 2026 | |

* part of a doubleheader with other teams; not included in rank
† sellout

=== Playoffs ===
As of November 23, 2025

| Rank | Home team | Score | Away team | Attendance | Venue | Date | Stage | Ref. |
|---|---|---|---|---|---|---|---|---|
| 1 | San Diego Wave | 0–1 | OL Reign | 32,262 | Snapdragon Stadium | November 5, 2023 | Semifinal | |
| 2 | San Diego Wave | 2–1 (a.e.t.) | Chicago Red Stars | 26,215 | Snapdragon Stadium | October 16, 2022 | Quarterfinal | |
| 3 | Portland Thorns | 0–1 (a.e.t.) | NJ/NY Gotham | 25,218† | Providence Park | November 5, 2023 | Semifinal | |
| 4 | OL Reign | 1–2 | NJ/NY Gotham | 25,011 | Snapdragon Stadium | November 11, 2023 | Final | |
| 5 | Portland Thorns | 2–1 | San Diego Wave | 22,035 | Providence Park | October 23, 2022 | Semifinal | |
| 6 | OL Reign | 0–2 | Kansas City Current | 21,491 | Lumen Field | October 23, 2022 | Semifinal | |
| 7 | Houston Dash | 1–2 | Kansas City Current | 21,284† | PNC Stadium | October 16, 2022 | Quarterfinal | |
| 8 | Portland Thorns* | 0–3 | North Carolina Courage | 21,144† | Providence Park | September 22, 2018 | Final | |
| 9 | Portland Thorns | 3–4 | Western New York Flash | 20,086 | Providence Park | October 2, 2016 | Semifinal | |
| 10 | Washington Spirit | 3–2 | NJ/NY Gotham | 19,365† | Audi Field | November 16, 2024 | Semifinal | |
| 10 | Washington Spirit | 2-0 | Portland Thorns | 19,365† | Audi Field | November 15, 2025 | Semifinal | |

* indicates "home" team in predetermined venue for championship final
† sellout

== NWSL attendance vs. other leagues ==
=== Vs. other North American women's professional leagues ===
The following table compares the NWSL regular season average attendance against that of other professional women's sports leagues in North America.

| League | Year started | Sport | Teams | Games played | Season | Attendance | | | Ref. |
| League | Year started | Sport | Teams | Games played | Season | Average | Average vs. prior season | Total | Ref. |
|---|---|---|---|---|---|---|---|---|---|
| Women's National Basketball Association | 1996 | Basketball | 15 | 330 | 2026 | 11,474 | +4.4% | 3,786,546 | |
| National Women's Soccer League | 2013 | Soccer | 16 | 240 | 2026 | 11,015 | +3.2% | 2,643,616 | |
| Professional Women's Hockey League | 2024 (Note: The first PWHL season was billed as the 2023–24 season, but took place entirely within calendar 2024.) | Ice hockey | 8 | 120 | 2025–26 | 9,304 | +28.4% | 1,116,496 | |
| Major League Volleyball | 2024 (Note: Major League Volleyball began play in 2024 as the Pro Volleyball Federation. The league was rebranded to MLV following the 2025 season.) | Volleyball | 8 | 112 | 2025 | 3,765 | −16.1% | 421,726 | |
| Northern Super League | 2025 | Soccer | 6 | 75 | 2025 | 3,633 | —N/a (Note: Inaugural season.) | 272,496 | |
| USL Super League | 2024 | Soccer | 9 | 126 | 2025-26 | 2,634 | +5.9% | 331,842 | |
| Liga MX Femenil | 2016 | Soccer | 18 | 153 | 2026 Clausura | 2,281 | +10.4% | 346,691 | |
| National Pro Fastpitch (Note: NPF folded in 2021. Athletes Unlimited Softball League is the most recent professional softball league, but attendance numbers have not been published.) | 2004 | Fastpitch | 5 | 72 | 2015 (Note: NPF had 6 teams for its 2016 & 2017 seasons, though attendance numbers for those are not available) | 1,128 | +26% | ~135,360 | |

=== Vs. other professional soccer leagues in North America ===
The following table compares the NWSL regular season average attendance against the average regular season attendance for other professional soccer leagues in North America.

| League | Year started | Division | Teams | Matches played | Season | Attendance | | | Ref. |
| League | Year started | Division | Teams | Matches played | Season | Average | Average vs. prior season | Total | Ref. |
|---|---|---|---|---|---|---|---|---|---|
| Liga MX | 1943 | Men's DI | 18 (Note: As the consequence of a riot, Querétaro played its first four home matches of the Clausura behind closed doors.) | 153 | 2023 Clausura | 23,160 | +12.8% | 3,450,854 | |
| Major League Soccer | 1996 | Men's DI | 30 | 510 | 2025 | 21,988 | -5.4% | 10,011,578 | |
| National Women's Soccer League | 2013 | Women's DI | 14 | 182 | 2025 | 10,669 | −5.0% | 1,926,090 | |
| USL Championship (Note: Known as the United Soccer League before the 2019 season.) | 2011 | Men's DII | 30 | 360 | 2025 | 5,385 | | 1,938,630 | |
| Canadian Premier League | 2019 | Men's DI | 8 | 112 | 2025 | 3,998 | +0.4% | 447,800 | |
| Northern Super League | 2025 | Women's DI | 6 | 75 | 2025 | 3,633 | —N/a (Note: Inaugural season.) | 272,496 | |
| USL Super League | 2024 | Women's DI | 8 | 112 | 2024-25 | 2,487 | —N/a | 278,521 | |
| Liga MX Femenil | 2016 | Women's DI | 18 | 306 | 2023 Clausura | 2,483 | +23.8% | 367,442 | |
| USL League One | 2019 | Men's DIII | 11 | 170 | 2022 | 2,203 | +13.3% (Note: Compared to 2019, the last previous season unaffected by COVID-19 pandemic-related restrictions.) | 359,107 | |

=== Vs. other worldwide women's top-division soccer leagues ===
The following table compares the NWSL regular season average attendance against the regular season average attendance for a selection other top-flight soccer leagues from around the world; this list is not exhaustive.

| League | Year Started | Nation | # Teams | Season | Average attendance | Average vs. prior season | Total Attendance | Ref |
|---|---|---|---|---|---|---|---|---|
| National Women's Soccer League | 2013 | United States | 14 | 2025 | 10,669 | −5.0% | 1,926,090 | |
| Women's Super League | 2011 | England | 12 | 2024–25 | 6,639 | -9.8% | 876,315 | |
| Northern Super League | 2025 | Canada | 6 | 2025 | 3,633 | —N/a (Note: Inaugural season.) | 272,496 | |
| Frauen-Bundesliga | 1990 | Germany | 12 | 2024-25 | 2,692 | -6.4% | 355,407 | |
| USL Super League | 2024 | United States | 8 | 2024-25 | 2,487 | —N/a | 278,521 | |
| Liga MX Femenil | 2016 | Mexico | 18 | 2022-23 | 2,072 | -16% | 311,081 | |
| WE League | 2021 | Japan | 12 | 2022-23 | 1,401 | | 154,141 | |
| Liga F | 1988 | Spain | 16 | 2022-23 | 1,393 | +124% | 334,320 | |
| A-League Women | 2008 | Australia | 12 | 2022-23 | 1,249 | +8% | 126,194 | |
| Division 1 Féminine | 1974 | France | 12 | 2022-23 | 954 | +42% | 126,292 | |

== See also ==
- List of National Women's Soccer League stadiums
- NWSL records and statistics
- List of women's association football attendance records
- Record attendances in United States club soccer
