= The Women's Cup =

- Organizer(s): OnSide Entertainment; FXE Futbol; Agrinzonis Management Group
- Founded: 2021; 5 years ago
- Teams: 4
- Current champion(s): Racing Louisville FC (2 titles)
- Most championships: Racing Louisville FC (2 titles)
- Website: thewomenscup.world

The Women's Cup (often stylized as TWC) is an annual club women's soccer invitational tournament originally hosted by Racing Louisville FC in the United States.

== History ==
Launched by OnSide Entertainment, FXE Futbol, and Agrinzonis Management Group in 2021, before the formation of a FIFA-organized club world championship similar to the men's FIFA Club World Cup, The Women's Cup was viewed to provide opportunities for prominent women's club teams from different confederations to compete against one another, and was seen as a stepping stone for the eventual formation of the FIFA Women's Club World Cup, similar to the then-active Women's International Champions Cup.

The inaugural 2021 TWC was a four-team tournament which saw the hosts win in a dramatic shoot-out. TWC expanded to feature six North American, European, and Asian women's soccer teams competing for the championship in 2022. 2023 was the first year to see a staging of The Women's Cup outside of the United States, and 2024 was the first year to see multiple stagings in the same calendar year with the introduction of the "Global Series", with the champions of each tournament slated to play against each other in February 2025 as a "final four". The first 2024 tournament, stylized as TWC Colombia, was played at Estadio Olímpico Pascual Guerrero in Cali, Colombia, and featured four teams: NJ/NY Gotham FC and Racing Louisville FC from the NWSL; and América de Cali and Deportivo Cali of the Colombian Women's Football League. It was held during the NWSL preseason and scheduled as two doubleheaders on February 27 and March 2. The series continued with the TWC Louisville and TWC Kansas City tournaments, both of which were held during the summer.

== List of finals ==
Year	Host	Winners	Score	Runners-up
2021	Louisville, Kentucky,	(United States) Racing Louisville FC	2–2 (7–6 p)	(Germany) FC Bayern Munich
2022	Louisville, Kentucky	(United States) OL Reign	2–1	(United States) Racing Louisville FC
2023	Madrid, Spain	(Spain) Atlético Madrid	1–0	(Italy) AC Milan
2024	Cali, Colombia	(United States) NJ/NY Gotham FC	3–1	(United States) Racing Louisville FC
2025	São Paulo, Brazil	(United States) Racing Louisville FC	1–1 (3–2 p)	(Brazil) SE Palmeiras

== Results by club ==
Club	Winners	Runners-up	Third place	Fourth place	Total Appearances
(United States) Racing Louisville FC	2 (2021, 2025 )	2 (2022, 2024 C)	1 (2024 L)		5
(Spain) Atletico Madrid	1 (2023)	1 (2024 K)			2
(United States) OL Reign	1 (2022)				1
(United States) NJ/NY Gotham FC	1 (2024 C)				1
(Italy) Juventus FC	1 (2024 L)				1
(United States) Kansas City Current	1 (2024 K)				1
(Italy) AC Milan		1 (2023)		1 (2022)	2
(Germany) FC Bayern Munich		1 (2021)			1
(Brazil) Palmeiras		2 (2024, 2025)			2
(Colombia) América de Cali			2 (2023, 2024 C)		2
(France) PSG			1 (2021)		1
(Mexico) Club América			1 (2022)		1
(Japan) INAC Kobe Leonessa			1 (2024 K)		1
(United States) Chicago Red Stars				1 (2021)	1
(Argentina) River Plate				1 (2023)	1
(Colombia) Deportivo Cali				1 (2024 C)	1
(Chile) Colo-Colo				1 (2024 L)	1
(South Africa) Mamelodi Sundowns				1 (2024 K)	1
(Japan) Tokyo Verdy					1
(England) Tottenham Hotspur					1

== Broadcasting ==
In 2022, matches of the Women's Cup were broadcast via Paramount+.

The 2024 Summer tournaments were broadcast via vizio's WatchFree+ program in the United States and on DAZN in Europe.

== See also ==
- Women's International Champions Cup
- UEFA Women's Champions League
- AFC Women's Club Championship
- CAF Women's Champions League
- CONCACAF W Champions Cup
- CONMEBOL Copa Libertadores Femenina
