= 2016 Seattle Reign FC season =

Seattle Reign FC
2016 season
- Owners: Bill and Teresa Predmore
- General manager: Laura Harvey
- Head coach: Laura Harvey
- Stadium: Memorial Stadium
- NWSL: 5th (missed the playoffs)
- Top goalscorer: Manon Melis (7)
- Highest home attendance: 5,888 (Aug 27 vs. PTFC)
- Lowest home attendance: 3,987 (Apr 17 vs. SBFC)
- Average home league attendance: 4,599
Home colors	Away colors

The 2016 Seattle Reign FC season was the club's fourth season of play and their fourth season in the National Women's Soccer League, the top division of women's soccer in the United States. The club entered the season as the two-time defending winner of the NWSL Shield.

== Club ==
=== Coaching staff ===
Position	Staff
General Manager & Head Coach	(England) Laura Harvey
Assistant Coach	(England) Sam Laity
Goalkeeper Coach	(United States) Ben Dragavon

Last updated: August 30, 2016
Source: https://www.reignfc.com/

=== Roster ===
Note: Flags indicate national team as defined under FIFA eligibility rules; some limited exceptions apply. Players may hold more than one non-FIFA nationality.

No.	Pos.	Nation	Player
3	DF	USA	Lauren Barnes
4	DF	SCO	Rachel Corsie
21	DF	USA	Michelle Cruz
25	FW	USA	Kiersten Dallstream
6	MF	USA	Lindsay Elston
10	MF	WAL	Jess Fishlock
13	DF	USA	Kendall Fletcher
36	FW	JPN	Nahomi Kawasumi
28	GK	USA	Haley Kopmeyer
8	MF	SCO	Kim Little

No.	Pos.	Nation	Player
9	FW	USA	Merritt Mathias
14	FW	NED	Manon Melis
16	DF	USA	Carson Pickett
15	FW	USA	Megan Rapinoe
7	DF	USA	Elli Reed
19	MF	USA	Havana Solaun
24	GK	USA	Andi Tostanoski
20	MF	JPN	Rumi Utsugi
11	MF	USA	Keelin Winters (captain)
17	FW	USA	Beverly Yanez

== Competitions ==
Win Tie Loss

=== Preseason ===
March 27, 2016 PTFC Tournament	Portland Thorns FC	0–2	Seattle Reign FC	Portland, Oregon
17:00 (PDT)	Horan (yellow card) 59'; Nadim (yellow card) 90'	Box; Recap	Mathias (yellow card) 59'; Solaun 75'; Fishlock 77'	Stadium: Providence Park; Attendance: N/A; Referee: N/A

March 30, 2016 PTFC Tournament	Seattle Reign FC	2–0	Houston Dash	Portland, Oregon
17:00 (PDT)	Yanez 36'; Dallstream 81'; Corsie (yellow card); Foxhoven (yellow card)	Recap	Brooks (yellow card)	Stadium: Providence Park; Attendance: N/A; Referee: N/A

April 2, 2016 PTFC Tournament	Seattle Reign FC	2–1	Oregon State Beavers	Portland, Oregon
14:30 (PDT)	Foxhoven 2'; Cruz 29'	Box; Recap	Faris 61'; Santarossa (yellow card)	Stadium: Providence Park; Attendance: N/A; Referee: N/A

April 9, 2016 Community Shield	Seattle Reign FC	4–1	Washington Huskies	Seattle, Washington
19:00 (PDT)	Melis 18', 45'; Yanez 26'; Mathias 48' (pen.)	Box; Report	Serwold 85'; Johnston (yellow card)	Stadium: Memorial Stadium; Attendance: 3,633; Referee: N/A

=== International friendlies ===
May 26, 2016	Seattle Reign FC (United States)	1–1	(England) Arsenal Ladies	Seattle, Washington
19:30 (PDT)	Yanez 17'; Reed (yellow card) 83'	Report	van de Donk (yellow card) 56'; Natalia 64' (pen.)	Stadium: Memorial Stadium; Attendance: 4,083

=== Regular season ===
April 17, 2016 1	Seattle Reign FC	1–2	Sky Blue FC	Seattle, Washington
16:00 (PDT)	Solo (yellow card) 37'; Mathias 52'; Corsie (yellow card) 81'	Box; Report	Kai 15'; Conheeney 67'	Stadium: Memorial Stadium; Attendance: 3,987; Referee: Karen Abt

April 24, 2016 2	Boston Breakers	0–3	Seattle Reign FC	Allston, Massachusetts
15:30 (PDT)	Ratcliffe (yellow card); Zerboni (yellow card)	Box; Recap	Melis 9'; Corsie 39'; Solo (yellow card) 49'; Little 79'	Stadium: Jordan Field; Attendance: 3,743; Referee: Matthew Franz

May 1, 2016 3	Seattle Reign FC	1–0	FC Kansas City	Seattle, Washington
16:00 (PDT)	Little 56'; Elston (yellow card) 90+'	Box; Report		Stadium: Memorial Stadium; Attendance: 4,083; Referee: Greg Dopka

May 8, 2016 4	Orlando Pride	2–0	Seattle Reign FC	Orlando, Florida
20:00 (PDT)	Hagen 12'; Sanderson 87'	Box; Report		Stadium: Camping World Stadium; Attendance: 8,211; Referee: Leszek Stalmach

May 14, 2016 5	Seattle Reign FC	1–1	Portland Thorns FC	Seattle, Washington
19:00 (PDT)	Yanez 49'	Box; Report	Nadim 46'; Horan (yellow card) 86'; Morris (yellow card) 90'	Stadium: Memorial Stadium; Attendance: 4,631; Referee: Matthew Kreitzer

May 22, 2016 6	Seattle Reign FC	1–2	Chicago Red Stars	Seattle, Washington
16:00 (PDT)	Corsie (yellow card) 74'; Little 89' (pen.)	Box; Report	Hoy 55', 67'	Stadium: Memorial Stadium; Attendance: 4,056; Referee: Reyna Fonseca

May 29, 2016 7	Portland Thorns FC	0–0	Seattle Reign FC	Portland, Oregon
16:00 (PDT)		Box; Report	Reed (yellow card) 84'	Stadium: Providence Park; Attendance: 18,114; Referee: Greg Dopka

June 12, 2016 8	Seattle Reign FC	1–0	Houston Dash	Seattle, Washington
16:00 (PDT)	Solaun 66'	Box; Report		Stadium: Memorial Stadium; Attendance: 4,682; Referee: Marco Vega

June 19, 2016 9	Sky Blue FC	0–0	Seattle Reign FC	Piscataway, New Jersey
3:00 p.m. (PDT)		Box; Recap		Stadium: Yurcak Field; Attendance: 1,547; Referee: Margaret Domka

June 25, 2016 10	FC Kansas City	0–0	Seattle Reign FC	Kansas City, Missouri
4:00 p.m. (PDT)	Scott (yellow card) 59'; Sauerbrunn (yellow card) 90+'	Box; Recap	Corsie (yellow card) 18'; Pickett (red card) 90'	Stadium: Swope Soccer Village; Attendance: 3,041; Referee: Greg Dopka

July 2, 2016 11	Seattle Reign FC	2–0	Boston Breakers	Seattle, Washington
19:00 (PDT)	Kawasumi 14', 62'	Box; Recap	King (yellow card) 40'; Ratcliffe (yellow card) 72'	Stadium: Memorial Stadium; Attendance: 4,327; Referee: Farhad Dadkho

July 9, 2016 12	Western New York Flash	3–2	Seattle Reign FC	Rochester, New York
4:00 p.m. (PDT)	Erceg 38', 45'; Williams 83'	Box; Recap	Kawasumi 22'; Winters (yellow card) 64'; Mathias (yellow card) 82'; Utsugi 90'	Stadium: Frontier Field; Attendance: 4,314; Referee: Karen Abt

July 16, 2016 13	Seattle Reign FC	1–1	Western New York Flash	Seattle, Washington
19:00 (PDT)	Melis 3'; Winters (yellow card) 33'; Reed (yellow card) 74'; Fishlock (yellow card) 90+'	Box; Report	McDonald 45'; Zerboni (yellow card) 47'	Stadium: Memorial Stadium; Attendance: 4,521; Referee: Ekaterina Koroleva

July 23, 2016 14	Seattle Reign FC	5–2	Orlando Pride	Seattle, Washington
19:00 (PDT)	Little 21' (pen.); Fishlock 30'; Melis 47'; Fletcher 56'; Dallstream (yellow card) 81'; Pressley 87' (o.g.)	Box; Report	Spencer 52'; Edmonds 89'	Stadium: Memorial Stadium; Attendance: 5,103; Referee: Christopher Spivey

July 30, 2016 15	Portland Thorns FC	1–0	Seattle Reign FC	Portland, Oregon
7:30 p.m. (PDT)	Nadim 74'	Box; Report	Fishlock (yellow card) 62'	Stadium: Providence Park; Attendance: 19,231; Referee: Malik Badawi

August 27, 2016 16	Seattle Reign FC	3–1	Portland Thorns FC	Seattle, Washington
14:00 (PDT)	Melis 27', 50'; Barnes (yellow card) 54'; Fishlock (yellow card) 65'; Rapinoe 94'	Box; Recap	Reynolds (yellow card) 71'; Long 92'	Stadium: Memorial Stadium; Attendance: 5,888; Referee: Rosendo Mendoza

September 4, 2016 17	Chicago Red Stars	2–2	Seattle Reign FC	Bridgeview, Illinois
16:00 (PDT)	Huerta 27'; Press 79' (pen.)	Box; Report	Melis 5'; Barnes 9'; Fishlock (yellow card) 80'	Stadium: Toyota Park; Attendance: 3,355; Referee: Christina Unkel

September 7, 2016 18	Washington Spirit	2–1	Seattle Reign FC	Boyds, Maryland
2:00 p.m. (PDT)	Dunn 50+'; Williams 62'	Box; Recap	Little 70' (pen.); Fletcher (yellow card) 74'	Stadium: Maryland SoccerPlex; Attendance: 3,039; Referee: Guido Gonzalez Jr.

September 11, 2016 19	Seattle Reign FC	2–0	Washington Spirit	Seattle, Washington
18:00 (PDT)	Yanez 27'; Winters 78'	Box; Recap		Stadium: Memorial Stadium; Attendance: 4,711; Referee: Greg Dopka

September 25, 2016 20	Houston Dash	2–3	Seattle Reign FC	Houston, Texas
18:30 (PDT)	Ohai 39'; Lloyd 42'	Box; Report	Mathias (yellow card) 13'; Melis 60'; Little 76'; Yanez 82'	Stadium: BBVA Compass Stadium; Attendance: 5,651; Referee: Farhad Dadkho

==== Regular-season standings ====
Pos	Team	Pld	W	D	L	GF	GA	GD	Pts	Qualification
1	Portland Thorns FC	20	12	5	3	35	19	+16	41	NWSL Shield
2	Washington Spirit	20	12	3	5	30	21	+9	39	NWSL Playoffs
3	Chicago Red Stars	20	9	6	5	24	20	+4	33	NWSL Playoffs
4	Western New York Flash (C)	20	9	5	6	40	26	+14	32	NWSL Playoffs
5	Seattle Reign FC	20	8	6	6	29	21	+8	30	
6	FC Kansas City	20	7	5	8	18	20	−2	26	
7	Sky Blue FC	20	7	5	8	24	30	−6	26	
8	Houston Dash	20	6	4	10	29	29	0	22	
9	Orlando Pride	20	6	1	13	20	30	−10	19	
10	Boston Breakers	20	3	2	15	14	47	−33	11	

Source: NWSL
Rules for classification: Tiebreakers
(C) Champions

===== Results summary =====
Overall								Home						Away					
Pld	Pts	W	L	T	GF	GA	GD	W	L	T	GF	GA	GD	W	L	T	GF	GA	GD
20	30	8	6	6	29	21	+8	6	2	2	18	9	+9	2	4	4	11	12	−1

Last updated: September 26, 2016
Source: http://www.nwslsoccer.com/teams/seattle-reign-fc
Pld = Matches played; Pts = Points; W = Matches won; T = Matches tied; L = Matches lost; GF = Goals for; GA = Goals against; GD = Goal difference

===== Results by matchday =====
Round	1	2	3	4	5	6	7	8	9	10	11	12	13	14	15	16	17	18	19	20
Stadium	H	A	H	A	H	H	A	H	A	A	H	A	H	H	A	H	A	A	H	A
Result	L	W	W	L	D	L	D	W	D	D	W	L	D	W	L	W	D	L	W	W
Position (Note: SRFC's position at the end of the day in which their match was played.)	6	3	3	6	7	6	7	6	6	7	5	6	6	6	6	5	5	5	5	5

Updated to match(es) played on September 26, 2016. Source: nwslsoccer.com
A = Away; H = Home; W = Win; D = Draw; L = Loss

== Statistics ==
Numbers in parentheses denote appearances as substitute.
* Tostanoski's appearances came while she was still an amateur call-up.

Last updated: September 26, 2016.
Source: http://nwslsoccer.com/teams/seattle-reign-fc

No.	Pos.	Nat.	Name	Regular Season		Discipline	
No.	Pos.	Nat.	Name	Apps	Goals	Yellow card	Red card
3	DF	(United States) USA	Lauren Barnes	20	1	1	0
4	DF	(Scotland) SCO	Rachel Corsie	11 (1)	1	3	0
6	MF	(United States) USA	Lindsay Elston	0 (12)	0	1	0
7	DF	(United States) USA	Elli Reed	14 (2)	0	2	0
8	MF	(Scotland) SCO	Kim Little	20	6	0	0
9	FW	(United States) USA	Merritt Mathias	17 (2)	1	2	0
10	MF	(Wales) WAL	Jess Fishlock	16	1	4	0
11	MF	(United States) USA	Keelin Winters	20	1	2	0
13	DF	(United States) USA	Kendall Fletcher	20	1	1	0
14	FW	(Netherlands) NED	Manon Melis	15 (1)	7	0	0
15	FW	(United States) USA	Megan Rapinoe	2 (3)	1	0	0
16	DF	(United States) USA	Carson Pickett	8 (7)	0	0	1
17	FW	(United States) USA	Beverly Yanez	18 (2)	3	0	0
19	MF	(United States) USA	Havana Solaun	3 (3)	1	0	0
20	MF	(Japan) JPN	Rumi Utsugi	6 (1)	1	0	0
21	DF	(United States) USA	Michelle Cruz	0 (4)	0	0	0
24	GK	(United States) USA	Andi Tostanoski	1 (1)*	0	0	0
25	FW	(United States) USA	Kiersten Dallstream	2 (9)	0	1	0
28	GK	(United States) USA	Haley Kopmeyer	11	0	0	0
36	FW	(Japan) JPN	Nahomi Kawasumi	8 (2)	3	0	0
		Own Goal		1			
Players who left the club during the season
1	GK	(United States) USA	Hope Solo	8	0	2	0
12	DF	(United States) USA	Paige Nielsen	0 (2)	0	0	0

== Awards ==
=== FIFA FIFPro Women's World11 ===
- Hope Solo

=== BBC Women's Footballer of the Year ===
- Kim Little (winner)

=== The 100 Best Footballers in The World ===
- No. 4: Kim Little
- No. 22: Jess Fishlock
- No. 40: Hope Solo
- No. 56: Manon Melis

=== NWSL Season Awards ===
- Defender of the Year: Lauren Barnes
- Best XI: Lauren Barnes
- Second XI: Jess Fishlock, Kim Little

=== NWSL Player of the Week ===
- Week 2: Kim Little (1G, 2A at Boston Breakers)
- Week 3: Kim Little (GWG vs. FC Kansas City)
- Week 11: Nahomi Kawasumi (2G vs. Boston Breakers)
- Week 16: Manon Melis (2G vs. Portland Thorns FC)

=== NWSL Save of the Week ===
- Week 14: Kendall Fletcher

=== Team awards ===
- Kendall Fletcher, MVP
- Keelin Winters, Unsung Hero
- Manon Melis, Offensive Player of the Year
- Kendall Fletcher, Defensive Player of the Year
- Manon Melis, Golden Boot (7G)
- Megan Rapinoe, Goal of the Year (vs. Portland Thorns FC, August 27)
- Haley Kopmeyer, Best Social Media

== Contract extensions ==
Date	Player	Pos	Notes	Ref
November 23, 2015	(United States) Lauren Barnes	DF	Signed to new contract	
November 23, 2015	(Wales) Jess Fishlock	MF	Signed to new contract	
November 23, 2015	(United States) Kendall Fletcher	DF	Signed to new contract	
November 23, 2015	(United States) Haley Kopmeyer	GK	Signed to new contract	
November 23, 2015	(Scotland) Kim Little	MF	Signed to new contract	
November 23, 2015	(United States) Elli Reed	DF	Signed to new contract	
November 23, 2015	(United States) Keelin Winters	MF	Signed to new contract	
November 25, 2015	(Scotland) Rachel Corsie	DF	Club option exercised	
November 25, 2015	(United States) Kiersten Dallstream	FW	Club option exercised	
November 25, 2015	(United States) Merritt Mathias	FW	Club option exercised	
November 25, 2015	(United States) Havana Solaun	MF	Club option exercised	
November 25, 2015	(United States) Caroline Stanley	GK	Club option exercised	
November 25, 2015	(United States) Beverly Yanez	FW	Club option exercised	

== Transfers ==
For transfers in, dates listed are when the Reign FC officially signed the players to the roster. Transactions where only the rights to the players are acquired (e.g., draft picks) are not listed, and amateur call-ups are not considered official signings either. For transfers out, dates listed are when the Reign FC officially removed the players from its roster, not when they signed with another club. If a player later signed with another club, her new club will be noted, but the date listed here remains the one when she was officially removed from the Reign FC roster.

=== In ===
Date	Player	Pos	Previous club	Notes	Ref
October 26, 2015	(United States) Meghan Klingenberg	DF	(United States) Houston Dash	Traded, along with a conditional selection in the 2017 NWSL College Draft, for Amber Brooks and the No. 5 overall selection in the 2016 NWSL College Draft	
November 25, 2015	(Netherlands) Manon Melis	FW	(Sweden) Göteborg FC	Free	
November 25, 2015	(Sweden) Antonia Göransson	DF	(Sweden) Vittsjö GIK	Free	
April 11, 2016	(United States) Carson Pickett	DF	(United States) Florida State Seminoles	Free; 2016 draft pick	
April 11, 2016	(United States) Lindsay Elston	MF	(France) FC Metz-Algrange	Free	
April 24, 2016	(United States) Andi Tostanoski	GK	(United States) Santa Clara Broncos	Free; GK replacement for match at BOS	
May 5, 2016	(United States) Paige Nielsen	DF	(United States) North Carolina Tar Heels	Free; 2016 draft pick	
May 20, 2016	(United States) Andi Tostanoski	GK	(United States) Seattle Reign FC	Free; GK replacement for match vs. CRS	
June 2, 2016	(Japan) Rumi Utsugi	MF	(France) Montpellier HSC	Free	
June 16, 2016	(Japan) Nahomi Kawasumi	FW	(Japan) INAC Kobe Leonessa	Free	
August 27, 2016	(United States) Andi Tostanoski	GK	(United States) Seattle Reign FC	Free	

==== Draft picks ====
Draft picks are not automatically signed to the team roster. Only those who are signed to a contract will be listed as transfers in. Only trades involving draft picks and executed during the 2016 NWSL College Draft on January 15, 2016, will be listed in the notes.

Player	Pos	Previous club	Notes
(United States) Carson Pickett	DF	(United States) Florida State Seminoles	1st round, 4th pick (4th pick overall)
(United States) Paige Nielsen	DF	(United States) North Carolina Tar Heels	3rd round, 5th pick (25th pick overall)
(United States) Summer Green	FW	(United States) North Carolina Tar Heels	3rd round, 10th pick (30th pick overall)
(United States) Lindsey Luke	GK	(United States) Utah Utes	4th round, 10th pick (40th pick overall)

=== Out ===
Date	Player	Pos	Destination Club	Notes	Ref
October 6, 2015	(Denmark) Katrine Veje	FW	(Denmark) Brøndby IF	Waived	
October 8, 2015	(Samoa) Mariah Bullock	MF		Retired	
October 19, 2015	(United States) Stephanie Cox	DF		Retired	
October 26, 2015	(United States) Amber Brooks	MF	(United States) Houston Dash	Traded, along with the No. 5 overall selection in the 2016 NWSL College Draft, for Meghan Klingenberg and a conditional selection in the 2017 NWSL College Draft	
November 2, 2015	(United States) Meghan Klingenberg	DF	(United States) Orlando Pride	The No. 1 selection in the 2015 NWSL Expansion Draft	
December 22, 2015	(United States) Caroline Stanley	GK	(United States) Sky Blue FC	Waived	
January 18, 2016	(United States) Danielle Foxhoven	FW		Out of contract; left the club by mutual consent	
March 25, 2016	(Sweden) Antonia Göransson	DF	(Sweden) Mallbackens IF	Waived due to a medical issue	
April 25, 2016	(United States) Andi Tostanoski	GK	(United States) Seattle Reign FC	End of GK replacement	
May 23, 2016	(United States) Andi Tostanoski	GK	(United States) Seattle Reign FC	End of GK replacement	
July 1, 2016	(United States) Paige Nielsen	DF	(Cyprus) Apollon Ladies FC	Waived	
August 30, 2016	(United States) Hope Solo	GK		Personal leave for the remainder of the 2016 season	

=== Offseason loans ===
- Lauren Barnes, Melbourne City
- Jess Fishlock, Melbourne City
- Kendall Fletcher, Western Sydney Wanderers
- Nahomi Kawasumi, INAC Kobe Leonessa
- Beverly Yanez, Melbourne City

== See also ==
- 2016 National Women's Soccer League season
