= Kim Little =

Scottish footballer (born 1990)

Kim Little MBE
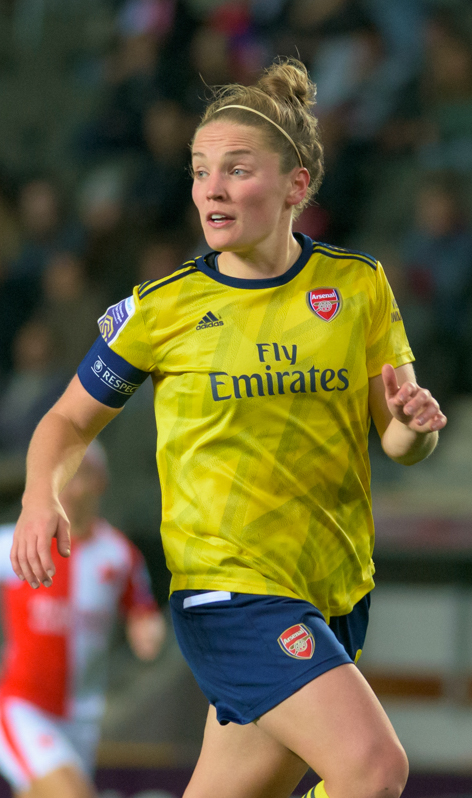
- Little playing for Arsenal in 2019

Personal information
- Full name: Kim Alison Little
- Date of birth: 29 June 1990 (age 36)
- Place of birth: Aberdeen, Scotland
- Height: 5 ft 4 in (1.62 m)
- Position: Attacking midfielder

Team information
- Current team: Arsenal
- Number: 10

Youth career
- 2000–2004: Buchan Girls FC
- 2005–2006: Hibs Girls FC

Senior career*
Years	Team	Apps	(Gls)
2006–2008	Hibernian Ladies	48	(88)
2008–2013	Arsenal	91	(57)
2014–2016	Seattle Reign	63	(32)
2015–2016	→ Melbourne City (loan)	12	(9)
2017–	Arsenal	148	(33)
2022	→ Seattle Reign (loan)	6	(0)

International career^{‡}
2007–2008	Scotland U19	8	(6)
2007–2021	Scotland	140	(59)
2012–2021	Great Britain	9	(0)
- * Club domestic league appearances and goals as of 22 November 2026 ‡ National team caps and goals as of 15 June 2021

Kim Alison Little MBE (born 29 June 1990) is a Scottish professional footballer who plays as a midfielder for and captains Arsenal of the English Women's Super League. Before her retirement from international duty in 2021, Little was vice-captain of the Scotland national team. She began her senior career at Hibernian, winning the Scottish Premier League, Scottish Women's Cup and Scottish Premier League Cup with the club in the 2006–2007 season. With Arsenal, she is a two time Premier League National Division winner, five time League Cup winner, three time Women's Super League and FA Cup winner, and a Champions League winner. During her time at Seattle Reign, Little won the Golden Boot and Most Valuable Player awards.

Little began representing Scotland at the senior international level in 2007 at age 16, scoring Scotland's first hat trick in 2012, and helping them qualify for Euro 2017 and the 2019 World Cup. She was one of two Scots selected for the Great Britain squad that reached the quarterfinals of the 2012 London Olympics, and again at the delayed 2020 Tokyo Olympics.

In 2010, she was named the FA's Women's Player of the Year. In 2013, she became the first recipient of the PFA Women's Players' Player of the Year award. In 2016, she was named BBC Women's Footballer of the Year after being nominated for the second consecutive year. Since 2019, Little has been named in the PFA WSL Team of the Year three times.

In 2025, Little captained Arsenal to win the UEFA Women's Champions League for the clubs second time and first in eighteen years. She is one of only two Scottish women's football players to have ever won the UWCL.

== Early life ==
Born in Aberdeen, Scotland and raised in Mintlaw, Aberdeenshire, Little began playing football at a young age with her father and brother. She played football for her primary school, Mintlaw Primary School and Mintlaw Boys Club as a youth. From age 10 to 14, she played at the youth level for Buchan Girls before joining the Hibernian Girls in 2005. At age 13, she attended and played for Mintlaw Academy. During her time with Hibernian Girls, Little would travel about three and a half hours each way from Aberdeenshire to Edinburgh for training. Of her youth, Little said, "Football gave me opportunities from a young age. Having the chance to travel, to play in different environments and to come up against really good players from all over Europe was fantastic and made me more determined to keep playing." Little attended the University of Hertfordshire, where she obtained a degree in Sports Studies while playing for Arsenal.

== Club career ==
=== Hibernian L.F.C., 2006–2008 ===
At the age of 16, Little made her debut for Hibernian of the Scottish Women's Premier League (SWPL) during a UEFA Women's Cup match against Espanyol at Almondvale Stadium on 8 August 2006. Hibs had signed Little and other players from their youth team to replace veterans Pauline Hamill, Nicky Grant and Debbie McWhinnie who all left the club that summer. On her league debut, she scored a hat trick against Hutchison Vale. During the 2006–07 season, Hibs won every match to win the SWPL championship and also lifted the Scottish Women's Cup, with Little scoring 55 goals in her 30 appearances in all competitions. In the first part of the following season, she again appeared in the UEFA Women's Cup, completed her set of domestic honours by winning the SWPL Cup and scored 33 goals in 18 appearances prior to her 20-month spell with Hibernian coming to an end. She later attended the 2008 Scottish cup final as a spectator, and was invited to collect a medal by her former teammates as she had played in an early round of the competition three months earlier.

=== Arsenal, 2008–2013 ===
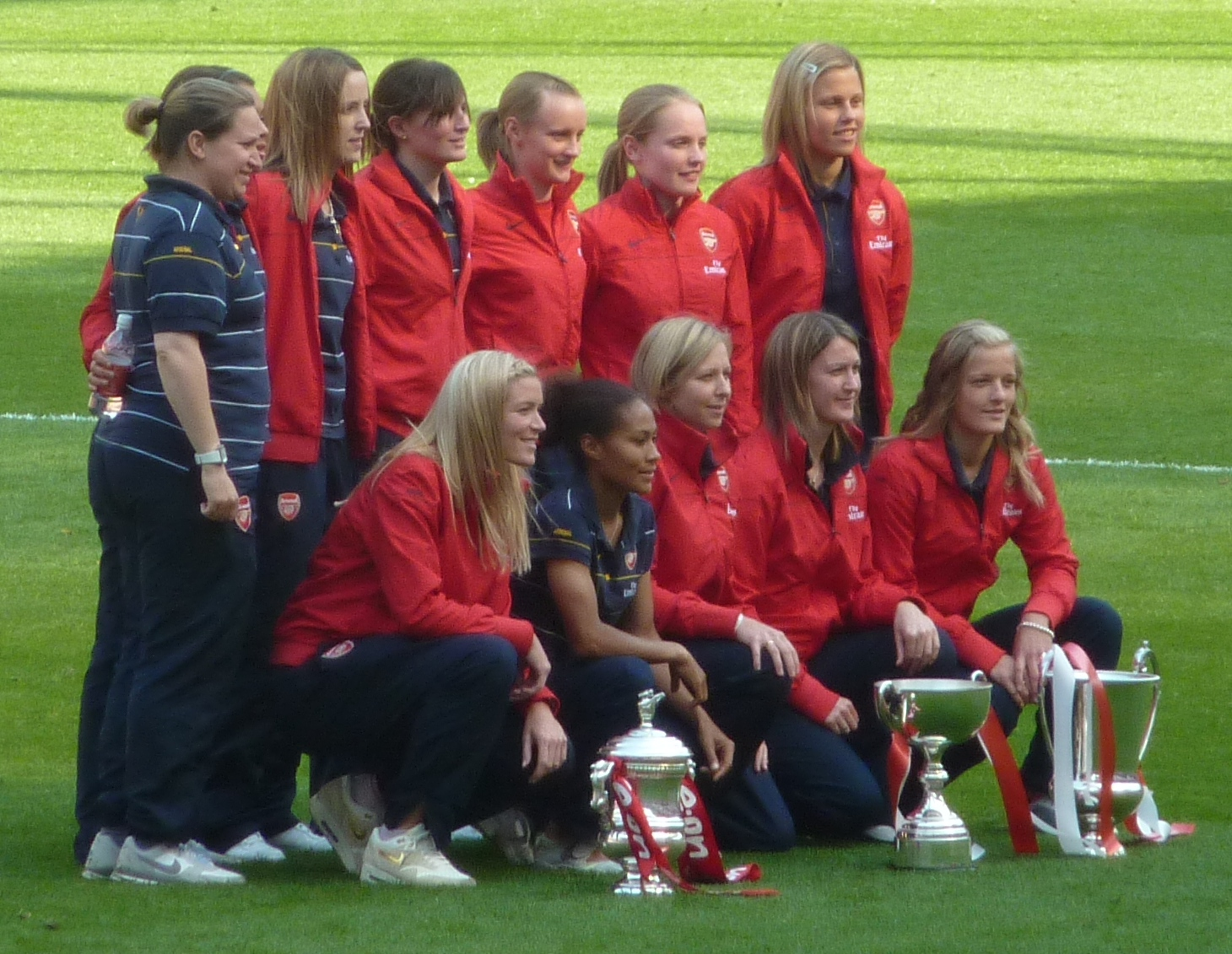
Little (top second from right) with Arsenal, 2009

==== FA Women's Premier League, 2008–2010 ====
In March 2008 at the age of 17, Little joined Arsenal in the FA Women's Premier League National Division. She scored her first goal for the club in April, during a 4–1 win over Chelsea before 5,000 fans at Emirates Stadium. Arsenal manager Vic Akers told reporters: "Make a note of this kid, she's going to be a big player." She was not eligible to play in Arsenal's 4–1 FA Women's Cup Final victory over Leeds United on 5 May 2008.

Little played in every league match during the 2008–09 season bar one, scoring 24 goals. Arsenal finished at the top of the regular season table with a 20–1–1 record. She also played in the 5–0 Premier League Cup Final victory over Doncaster Rovers Belles and scored in the FA Women's Cup Final as Arsenal beat Sunderland 2–1 before almost 25,000 fans at Pride Park in Derby. Little later described 2008–09 as her most memorable season, as Arsenal won a treble despite the departure of several leading players to Women's Professional Soccer (WPS) in America.

The following season Little's prolific goal scoring from the midfield helped Arsenal overcome the departure of Kelly Smith. After 47 goals in all competitions, the team finished the regular season in first place with a 20–1–1 record. Little was the league's leading scorer with 22 goals. She was named FA Players' Player of the Year in June 2010. Arsenal entered the 2010 FA Women's Cup Final hoping to lift the trophy for a fifth consecutive year. Despite Little's first half penalty, they were eventually upset 3–2 by Everton, after extra time.

==== FA WSL, 2011–2013 ====
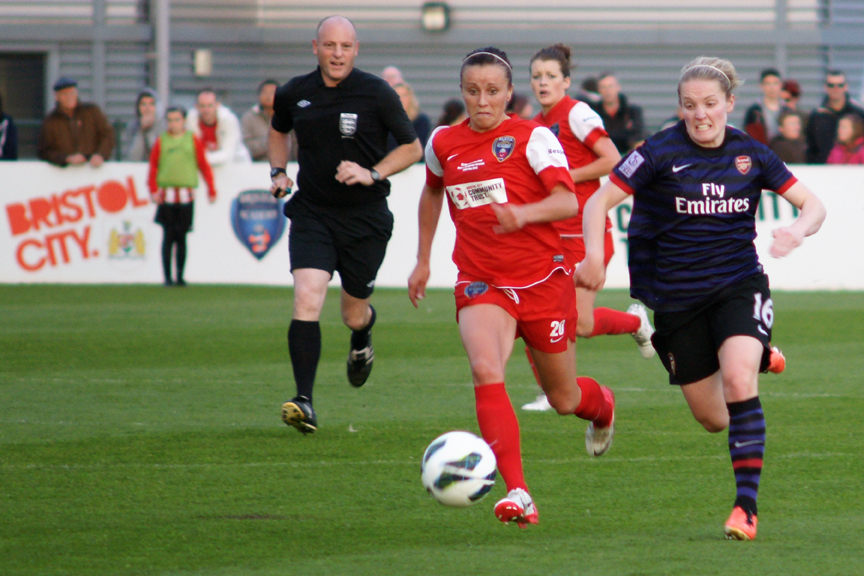
Little (right) versus Bristol Academy, May 2013

In 2011, the FA WSL was formed replacing the FA Women's Premier League as the top division of women's football in England. During the 2011 season, Little was the second-leading scorer in the league with nine goals. She scored a brace during a match against Doncaster Belles on 7 May 2011. Arsenal finished at the top of the league table with a 10–2–2 record. At the 2011 FA Women's Cup Final, Little was named Player of the Match and scored the opening goal in Arsenal's 2–0 win over Bristol Academy. After the game Arsenal manager Laura Harvey described Little as "world class."

During the 2012 season, Little was the league's top scorer with 11 goals. Arsenal clinched the regular season title with an undefeated 10–4–0 record and claimed their ninth consecutive English title. During a match against Chelsea L.F.C. on 26 April, she scored a brace with goals in the 47th and 90th minutes helping Arsenal win 3–1. She scored another brace during a 2–0 win against Liverpool L.F.C. on 6 May. Little was voted Women's Players' Player of the Year for 2012–13 by the Professional Footballers' Association, in the first year that the award was given to women. Upon receiving the award, Little said, "For years, I have watched this event on television, so to come here and win the first award is fantastic."

Prior to the 2013 season, Arsenal's head coach Laura Harvey left for Seattle Reign FC in the United States. Under new head coach Shelley Kerr, the Arsenal finished third in the regular season standings with a 10–3–1 record. In her 14 appearances for the club, Little scored three goals.

=== Seattle Reign FC, 2014–2016 ===
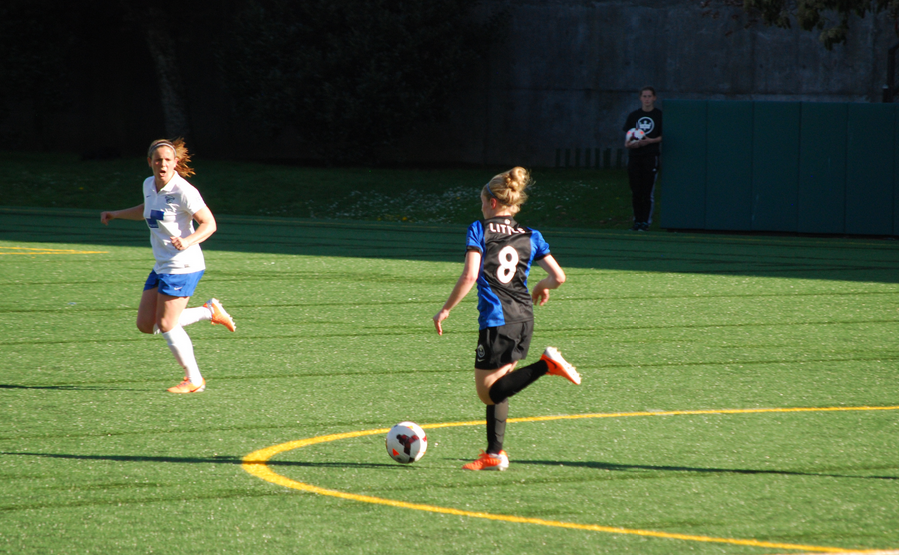
Little in a match against the Boston Breakers, April 2014

In November 2013, Little left deposed champions Arsenal after six years for American National Women's Soccer League (NWSL) club Seattle Reign FC. Laura Harvey had departed Arsenal to coach Seattle Reign the previous year and had made Little her top transfer target. Of the signing, Harvey said, "Kim is world-class. Her talent and proven experience will be a huge asset for our team in the coming seasons. Having coached Kim for nearly four years, I have no doubt that her creativity and goal-scoring ability will prove an exciting proposition for the NWSL."

During her first appearance for the Reign, she scored a brace against the Boston Breakers helping Seattle win 3–0. After scoring a league-high four goals during the month of April helping the Reign go undefeated in four games, she was named NWSL Player of the Month. She became the first player in the history of the league to be named Player of the Month twice after earning the honour for the month of May. Her five consecutive games with goals scored during the month tied the league record previously set by Abby Wambach during the previous season. She was named Player of the Month for a third time for the month of July after her three goals and four assists in six games helped Seattle secure a 4–1–1 record and clinch the 2014 NWSL Shield (regular season title) several weeks before the end of the season. The Reign finished the regular season with a 16–2–6 record and 54 points – 13 points ahead of the second place team, FC Kansas City. During the team's playoff semi-final match against Washington Spirit, Little scored one goal helping the Reign win 2–1 and advance to the championship final against FC Kansas City. The team was defeated by Kansas City 2–1. Little was named league MVP in her first season with the club. Her 16 goals during the regular season also earned her the league's Golden Boot award. Her seven assists tied for second highest in the league.

"Kim Little is the most talented player I have ever played with. She is great at everything. Her passing and vision and technical skill are, I believe, the best in the world."

— Hope Solo

After returning to the Reign for the 2015 season, Little was the team's leading scorer with 10 goals (second in the league following Crystal Dunn with 15). Her seven assists ranked first in the league. The Reign finished the regular season in first place clinching the NWSL Shield for the second consecutive time. After advancing to the playoffs, Seattle faced fourth-place team Washington Spirit and won 3–0, advancing to the championship final. Seattle was ultimately defeated 1–0 by FC Kansas City during the championship final in Portland. Little, along with teammates Lauren Barnes, Beverly Yanez, and Jess Fishlock, were named to the NWSL Best XI team.

During the first few months of the 2016 season, a number of offensive players became unavailable due to injury including Manon Melis, Jess Fishlock and Megan Rapinoe. During the team's second game of the season, Little served two assists and scored a goal in the 79th minute to secure a 3–0 win against the Boston Breakers. The following week, she scored the lone goal of the match against FC Kansas City. Little finished the regular season with six goals and two assists. Seattle finished the regular season in fifth place with a 8–6–8 record, narrowly missing a playoff spot by two points.

On 17 October 2016, Little announced that she would return to Arsenal L.F.C ahead of the 2017–18 FA WSL season. Harvey said Little was given an "incredible offer" of a multi-year contract, though no other details were disclosed.

==== Melbourne City FC (loan), 2015–2016 ====
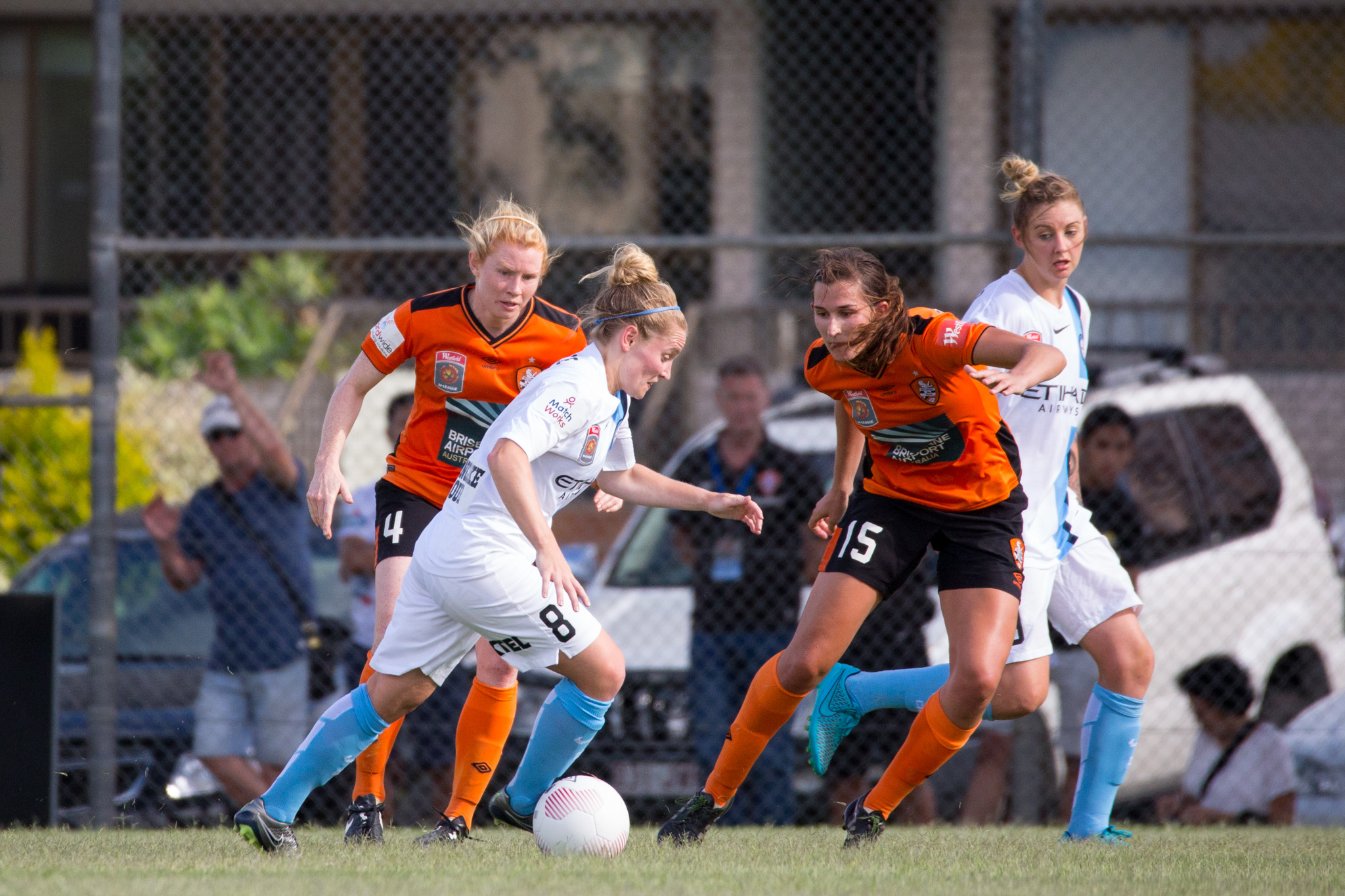
Little during a match against Brisbane Roar, December 2015

In October 2015, it was announced that Little had signed with Australian W-League team Melbourne City along with Seattle Reign FC teammate Jess Fishlock on loan for the 2015–16 season. On 9 November, she was named the league's Player of the Match after her first start for the club following international duty for Scotland. On 6 December, she served an assist to the first goal of the match by Scottish national teammate Jen Beattie and then scored a goal in the 80th minute against Melbourne Victory solidifying City's 4–0 win over their rival and extending City's regular season record to 8–0–0. Little ended the season having played 12 games for Melbourne City and scoring 9 goals, ranking only behind Larissa Crummer. Melbourne City won both the regular season and Grand Final. Little earned Player of the Match Award honours in the grand final.

On 4 February, Little announced that she would not return to Melbourne City for the 2016–2017 season, saying her time in the W-League was "a one year thing for me" and citing other priorities in October 2016, which she later announced as her transfer from Seattle Reign FC to Arsenal.

=== Return to Arsenal, 2017–present ===
In May 2017, Little sustained a rupture to her cruciate ligament during training with Arsenal, missing the better part of the season. On 14 March 2018, in the FA WSL Continental Tyres Cup final, Arsenal defeated Manchester City 1–0 to claim their fifth title.

Little suffered a fracture to a fibula during a 5–0 win against Chelsea in October 2018. The match officials were criticised for failing to send off Chelsea's Drew Spence, whose "heavy tackle" had injured Little. It was estimated that the injury would prevent her from playing for 10 weeks. Arsenal won the 2018–19 Super League, their first league championship in seven years.

Little signed a new contract with Arsenal in August 2019. She underwent surgery on an injured foot in February 2020.

Little returned to former club OL Reign on a short-term loan in June 2022.

In April 2023, during the 2022–23 Women's Super League season, Little was forced to miss the rest of the season, after picking up at hamstring injury.

On 24 January 2024, Little became Arsenal's sixth player to reach the milestone of making 300 appearances for the club as she featured in a 6–0 win over Reading in the FA Women's League Cup, with Arsenal's vice captain Leah Williamson saying of Little's achievement "To have been that consistent for that long, for one club and be loyal, I think that's something that shouldn't go unnoticed."

Little converted a penalty in the 3–1 win over Manchester United in front of the first sold out Super League match at Emirates Stadium.

At the start of the 2024/25 season, Little scored a penalty in Arsenal’s 6–0 win against Rangers W.F.C., in the Champions League. In January 2025, Little underwent surgery, after playing two matches with a broken finger. In February 2025 Little extended her contract with Arsenal until June 2026. She captained the Arsenal team that won the Champions League, defeating Barcelona 1–0 in the final.

Little was part of the team which won the inaugural FIFA Women's Champions Cup, as Arsenal defeated Corinthians 3–2 on 1 February 2026 in the final. She made her 400th appearance for Arsenal on 11 February 2026, coming on as a substitute in a 4–0 win against OH Leuven in the Champions League. Speaking after the match, head coach Renée Slegers said Little "does everything to be as good as possible in her own performances and for the team. She gets herself ready for every challenge. She's always reflecting and learning. She wants to do things the best way possible, so she's special to work with. She's very humble and I think we want to be humble as a team. We play with big belief and I think Kim embodies that and spreads that to the team." Little won the WSL Player of the Month Award for January 2026. On 22 February 2026, she scored the opening goal in Arsenal's 3–0 FA Cup win over Bristol City, qualifying Arsenal for the quarterfinals and marking the second FA Cup match in a row in which Little scored.

On 26 March 2026, Arsenal announced that Little had signed a new one-year extension with the club, keeping her in North London until June 2027.

== International career ==
=== Scotland ===
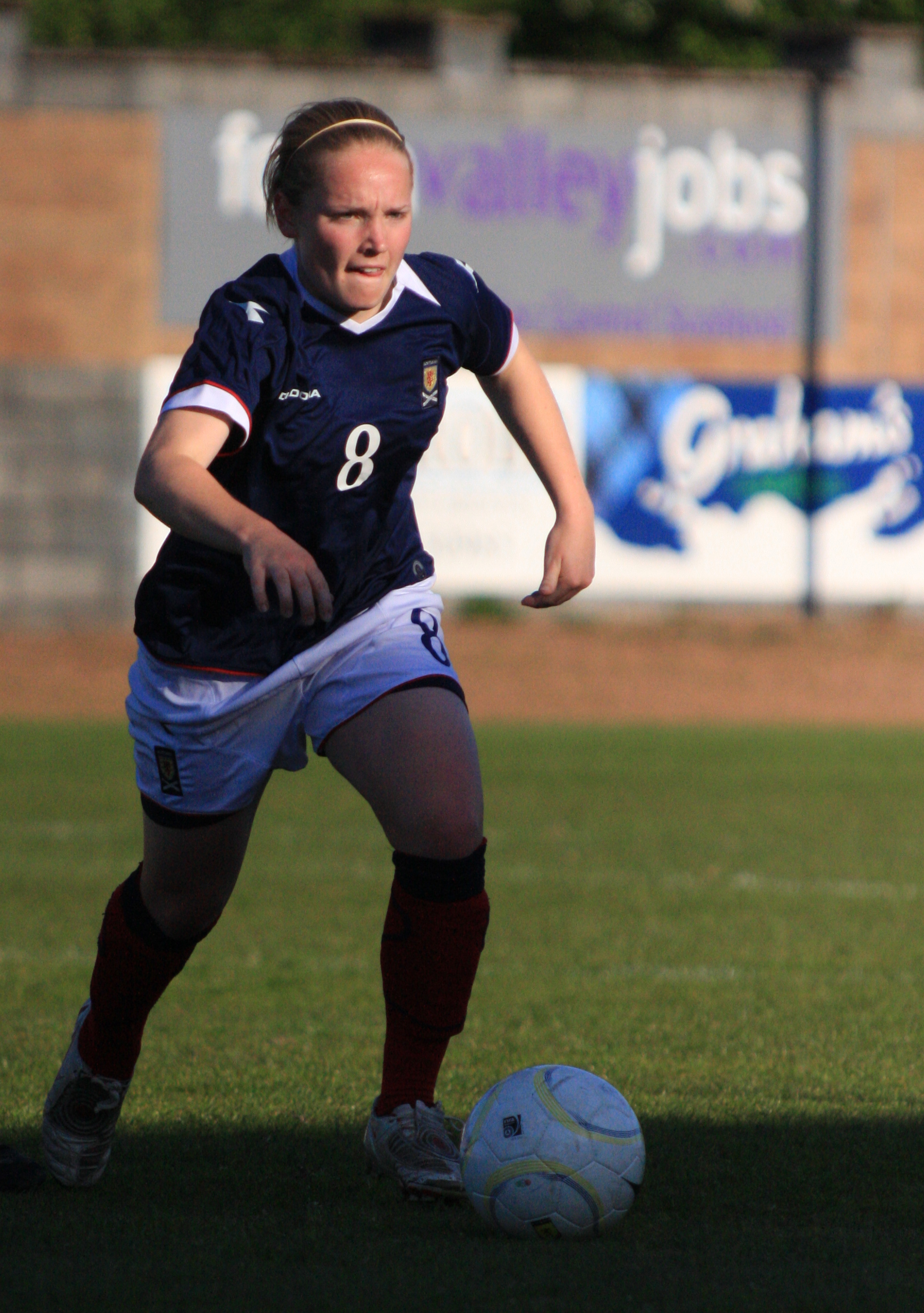
Little playing for Scotland, 2009

Little made her debut for the Scotland national team in February 2007 at the age of 16 in a match against Japan, coming in as a second-half substitute for Megan Sneddon. National coach Anna Signeul had no hesitation in promoting Little into the senior team at 16: "Kim is an exceptional talent. There's no limit to how far she can progress. She has technique, speed and power, and she reads the game extremely well." She scored her first international goal as Scotland lost to Russia in March 2008.

During her 50th cap, Little scored the game-opening goal in Scotland's 2–0 victory against rival England at the Cyprus Cup in March 2011. It was only the second time Scotland had ever defeated their rivals, and was the first time since 1977 – 13 years before Little was born.

On 16 June 2012, Little scored Scotland's first hat trick during the team's 8–0 win against Israel. In October 2012, she scored in both legs of Scotland's UEFA Euro 2013 qualifying play-off against Spain. In the second leg Verónica Boquete scored in injury time of extra time to make the score 3–2 to Spain and eliminate the Scots, who were left "utterly disconsolate" at missing out on qualification for their first ever final tournament.

In February 2013, Little scored Scotland's only goal during a friendly match against the United States in which the U.S. won 4–1. During the 2013 Cyprus Cup, Little scored a goal and served an assist in Scotland's 4–4 draw against England during the group stage of the tournament. She scored another goal in the 11th minute of the team's fifth place match against the Netherlands resulting in a 1–0 win for Scotland.

Little missed UEFA Euro 2017 due to her serious injury. After recovering from the injury, she helped Scotland qualify for the 2019 FIFA World Cup, their first appearance in a world finals. Little scored one of the goals in a key win against Switzerland during qualification.

During the build-up to the 2019 World Cup, Little scored in a 1–0 friendly win against Brazil. At 2019 World Cup, she scored the opening goal of the 3–3 draw with Argentina. Scotland

In their first game after the World Cup, a Euro 2021 qualifying match with Cyprus, Little scored five goals in an 8–0 win for Scotland.

On 1 September 2021, Little announced her retirement from the Scottish national team. She made a total of 140 appearances and scored 59 goals for Scotland.

=== Great Britain Olympic team ===
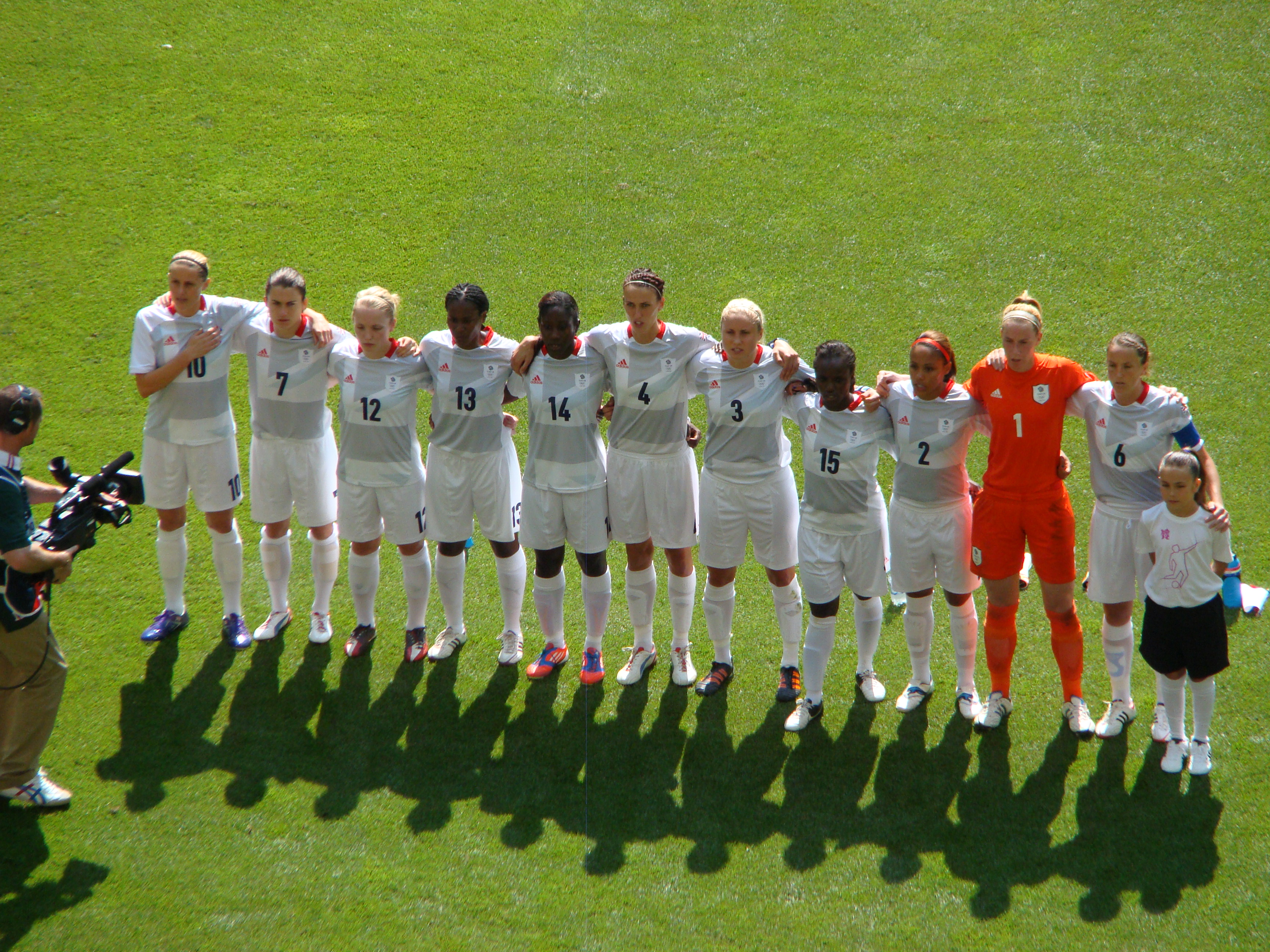
Little (third from left) with Great Britain women's Olympic football team, 2012

Despite opposition from Scottish Football Association with regard to Scottish players playing on a British team, Little was in favour of participating in the Great Britain team at the 2012 London Olympics: "I don't see why anyone would want to stop a player from playing at a massive tournament like the Olympics, it's the biggest sporting event ever. If I get the opportunity I'll grab it with both hands – I would definitely play."

Little was called up to the 18-player squad, one of only two non-English players chosen by team manager Hope Powell, the other being fellow Scot Ifeoma Dieke. Little chose not to sing the national anthem of the United Kingdom before the team's first competitive game, a 1–0 win against New Zealand. The Daily Telegraph newspaper reported that the British Olympic Association were angered by this. Hope Powell said she was not concerned, as some players prefer not to interrupt their pre-match preparation by singing the anthem. Two male Welsh footballers also made personal decisions to not sing the anthem.

Little provided two assists in the team's second group stage match, a 3–0 win against Cameroon. After winning all three matches and finishing at the top of the table for Group E in the group stage of the tournament, Great Britain advanced to the quarter finals where they faced Canada in front of 28,828 spectators at City of Coventry Stadium. Little started the match and played for 82 minutes, but Great Britain lost 2–0 and were knocked out of the tournament.

Little was one of two Scots selected by Great Britain for the 2020 Summer Olympics, which were delayed until 2021 due to the COVID-19 pandemic. Great Britain again reached the quarter-final of the Olympic tournament, where they lost 4–3 to Australia.

== Style of play ==
Little typically played as the advanced midfielder in Laura Harvey's 4–3–3 formation, but occupied a deeper role when playing for Scotland. Little transitioned to a deeper midfield role at Arsenal. In an interview with FIFA.com in July 2012, Little said: "Nearly all my goals come from midfield. That's my natural position. But I'm a player who always tries to make forward runs, be positive and to create and score goals."

== Personal life ==
Little is part of the No More Red with Arsenal, which is against knife violence. She is also completing the UEFA A Licence course. Several of her Arsenal teammates have credited her as a mentor and influence. In 2016, she appeared in a national campaign for Athlete Ally.

== Career statistics ==
=== Club ===
As of match played 22 November 2026

Appearances and goals by club, season and competition
Club	Season	League			Cups		Continental		Other		Total	
Club	Season	Division	Apps	Goals	Apps	Goals	Apps	Goals	Apps	Goals	Apps	Goals
Hibernian	2006–07	SWPL 1									30	55
Hibernian	2007–08	SWPL 1									18	33
Hibernian	Total										48	88
Arsenal	2007–08	WPL	8	1	—		—		—		8	1
Arsenal	2008–09	WPL	21	10	10	9	5	5	1	0	37	24
Arsenal	2009–10	WPL	21	23	9	13	5	9	1	2	36	47
Arsenal	2011	WSL	13	9	7	3	7	2	—		27	14
Arsenal	2012	WSL	14	11	7	5	8	3	—		29	19
Arsenal	2013	WSL	14	3	8	4	8	3	—		30	10
Arsenal	2014	WSL	—		—		4	5	—		4	5
Arsenal	Total		91	57	41	34	37	27	2	2	171	120
Seattle Reign FC	2014	NWSL	23	16	2 (Note: Appearances in the NWSL Playoffs)	1	—		—		25	17
Seattle Reign FC	2015	NWSL	20	10	2	0	—		—		22	10
Seattle Reign FC	2016	NWSL	20	6	—		—		—		20	6
Seattle Reign FC	Total		63	32	4	1	—		0	0	67	33
Melbourne City (loan)	2015–16	W-League	12	9	—		—		—		12	9
Arsenal	2017	WSL	0	0	2	1	—		—		2	1
Arsenal	2017–18	WSL	9	3	5	1	—		—		14	4
Arsenal	2018–19	WSL	14	8	7	4	—		—		21	12
Arsenal	2019–20	WSL	12	5	7	3	5	4	—		24	12
Arsenal	2020–21	WSL	16	5	7	3	—		—		23	8
Arsenal	2021–22	WSL	22	6	5	1	12	4	—		39	11
Arsenal	2022–23	WSL	11	4	5	2	7	2	—		23	8
Arsenal	2023–24	WSL	17	1	5	1	2	0	—		24	2
Arsenal	2024–25	WSL	20	1	2	0	14	1	—		36	2
Arsenal	2025–26	WSL	18	0	5	2	10	0	2 (Note: Appearances in FIFA Women's Champions Cup)	0	35	2
Arsenal	2026–27	WSL	9	0	0	0	5	0	—		14	0
Arsenal	Total		148	33	50	18	55	11	2	0	255	62
OL Reign (loan)	2022	NWSL	6	0	—		—		—		6	0
Career total			368+	219+	95	53	92	38	4	2	559	312

=== International ===
As of 30 July 2021

Year	Scotland		Great Britain	
Year	Apps	Goals	Apps	Goals
2007	9	0	—	
2008	14	3	—	
2009	11	1	—	
2010	14	9	—	
2011	12	4	—	
2012	14	9	4	0
2013	16	4	—	
2014	13	6	—	
2015	10	9	—	
2016	4	1	—	
2017	4	2	—	
2018	6	3	—	
2019	10	8	—	
2020	2	0	—	
2021	1	0	4	0
Total	140	59	8	0

Scores and results list Scotland's goal tally first, score column indicates score after each Little goal.

List of international goals scored by Kim Little
No.	Date	Venue	Opponent	Score	Result	Competition
1	12 March 2008	GSP Stadium, Nicosia, Cyprus	Russia		2–3	2008 Cyprus Cup
2	17 September 2008	McDiarmid Park, Perth, Scotland	Switzerland		4–0	Friendly
3	28 September 2008	McDiarmid Park, Perth, Scotland	Slovakia		6–0	UEFA Women's Euro 2009 qualifying
4	29 October 2009	Tynecastle Stadium, Edinburgh, Scotland	Georgia		3–1	2011 FIFA Women's World Cup qualification
5	3 March 2010	GSZ Stadium, Larnaca, Cyprus	South Africa		2–1	2010 Cyprus Cup
6	1 April 2010	Falkirk Stadium, Falkirk, Scotland	Bulgaria		8–1	2011 FIFA Women's World Cup qualification
7	1 April 2010	Falkirk Stadium, Falkirk, Scotland	Bulgaria		8–1	2011 FIFA Women's World Cup qualification
8	23 May 2010	Strathclyde Homes Stadium, Dumbarton, Scotland	Northern Ireland		2–0	Friendly
9	5 June 2010	Stadion Niedermatten, Wohlen, Aargau, Switzerland	Switzerland		3–3	Friendly
10	5 June 2010	Stadion Niedermatten, Wohlen, Aargau, Switzerland	Switzerland		3–3	Friendly
11	19 June 2010	Georgi Asparuhov Stadium, Sofia, Bulgaria	Bulgaria		5–0	Friendly
12	23 June 2010	Proszowianka Proszowice, Proszowice, Poland	Poland		2–1	Friendly
13	23 June 2010	Proszowianka Proszowice, Proszowice, Poland	Poland		2–1	Friendly
14	4 March 2011	GSP Stadium, Nicosia, Cyprus	England		2–0	2011 Cyprus Women's Cup
15	21 August 2011	Falkirk Stadium, Falkirk, Scotland	Switzerland		5–0	Friendly
16	12 October 2011	Ness Ziona Stadium, Ness Ziona, Israel	Israel		6–1	UEFA Women's Euro 2013 qualifying
17	12 October 2011	Ness Ziona Stadium, Ness Ziona, Israel	Israel		6–1	UEFA Women's Euro 2013 qualifying
18	6 March 2012	Paralimni Stadium, Paralimni, Cyprus	South Africa		2–0	2012 Cyprus Women's Cup
19	6 March 2012	Paralimni Stadium, Paralimni, Cyprus	South Africa		2–0	2012 Cyprus Women's Cup
20	26 May 2012	Stark's Park, Kirkcaldy, Scotland	Sweden		1–4	Friendly
21	16 June 2012	Tynecastle Stadium, Edinburgh, Scotland	Israel		8–0	UEFA Women's Euro 2013 qualifying
22	16 June 2012	Tynecastle Stadium, Edinburgh, Scotland	Israel		8–0	UEFA Women's Euro 2013 qualifying
23	16 June 2012	Tynecastle Stadium, Edinburgh, Scotland	Israel		8–0	UEFA Women's Euro 2013 qualifying
24	15 September 2012	Parc y Scarlets, Llanelli, Wales	Wales		2–1	UEFA Women's Euro 2013 qualifying
25	20 October 2012	Hampden Park, Glasgow, Scotland	Spain		1–1	UEFA Women's Euro 2013 qualifying
26	24 October 2012	La Ciudad del Fútbol, Las Rozas, Spain	Spain		2–3	UEFA Women's Euro 2013 qualifying
27	9 February 2013	EverBank Field, Jacksonville, Florida, United States	United States		1–4	Friendly
28	8 March 2013	GSZ Stadium, Larnaca, Cyprus	England		4–4	2013 Cyprus Women's Cup
29	13 March 2013	GSP Stadium, Nicosia, Cyprus	Netherlands		1–0	2013 Cyprus Women's Cup
30	26 September 2013	Fir Park, Motherwell, Scotland	Bosnia and Herzegovina		7–0	2015 FIFA Women's World Cup qualification
31	13 February 2014	Eerikkilän Urheiluopisto, Eerikkilä, Finland	Finland		1–3	Friendly
32	12 March 2014	GSZ Stadium, Larnaca, Cyprus	South Korea		1–1	2014 Cyprus Women's Cup
33	14 June 2014	Fir Park, Motherwell, Scotland	Sweden		1–3	2015 FIFA Women's World Cup qualification
34	19 June 2014	Solitude, Belfast, Northern Ireland	Northern Ireland		2–0	2015 FIFA Women's World Cup qualification
35	13 September 2014	Fir Park, Motherwell, Scotland	Faroe Islands		9–0	2015 FIFA Women's World Cup qualification
36	25 October 2014	Tynecastle Stadium, Edinburgh, Scotland	Netherlands		1–2	2015 FIFA Women's World Cup qualification
37	6 March 2015	GSZ Stadium, Larnaca, Cyprus	Italy		2–3	2015 Cyprus Women's Cup
38	9 March 2015	GSZ Stadium, Larnaca, Cyprus	South Korea		2–1	2015 Cyprus Women's Cup
39	11 March 2015	Ammochostos Stadium, Larnaca, Cyprus	Netherlands		3–1	2015 Cyprus Women's Cup
40	11 March 2015	Ammochostos Stadium, Larnaca, Cyprus	Netherlands		3–1	2015 Cyprus Women's Cup
41	11 March 2015	Ammochostos Stadium, Larnaca, Cyprus	Netherlands		3–1	2015 Cyprus Women's Cup
42	22 September 2015	Ajdovščina Stadium, Ajdovščina, Slovenia	Slovenia		3–0	UEFA Women's Euro 2017 qualifying
43	22 September 2015	Ajdovščina Stadium, Ajdovščina, Slovenia	Slovenia		3–0	UEFA Women's Euro 2017 qualifying
44	22 September 2015	Ajdovščina Stadium, Ajdovščina, Slovenia	Slovenia		3–0	UEFA Women's Euro 2017 qualifying
45	27 October 2015	FFM Training Centre, Skopje, Macedonia	Macedonia		4–1	UEFA Women's Euro 2017 qualifying
46	8 April 2016	St Mirren Park, Paisley, Scotland	Slovenia		3–1	UEFA Women's Euro 2017 qualifying
47	23 January 2017	Paralimni Stadium, Paralimni, Cyprus	Denmark		1–1	Friendly
48	1 March 2017	Ammochostos Stadium, Larnaca, Cyprus	New Zealand		3–2	2017 Cyprus Women's Cup
49	12 June 2018	Kielce City Stadium, Kielce, Poland	Poland		3–2	2019 FIFA Women's World Cup qualification
50	30 August 2018	St Mirren Park, Paisley, Scotland	Switzerland		2–1	2019 FIFA Women's World Cup qualification
51	4 September 2018	Loro Borici Stadium, Shkoder, Albania	Albania		2–1	2019 FIFA Women's World Cup qualification
52	4 March 2019	Bela Vista Municipal Stadium, Parchal, Portugal	Iceland		4–1	2019 Algarve Cup
53	8 April 2019	Pinatar Arena Football Centre, San Pedro del Pinatar, Spain	Brazil		1–0	Friendly
54	19 June 2019	Parc des Princes, Paris, France	Argentina		3–3	2019 FIFA Women's World Cup
55	30 August 2019	Easter Road, Edinburgh, Scotland	Cyprus		8–0	UEFA Women's Euro 2021 qualifying
56	30 August 2019	Easter Road, Edinburgh, Scotland	Cyprus		8–0	UEFA Women's Euro 2021 qualifying
57	30 August 2019	Easter Road, Edinburgh, Scotland	Cyprus		8–0	UEFA Women's Euro 2021 qualifying
58	30 August 2019	Easter Road, Edinburgh, Scotland	Cyprus		8–0	UEFA Women's Euro 2021 qualifying
59	30 August 2019	Easter Road, Edinburgh, Scotland	Cyprus		8–0	UEFA Women's Euro 2021 qualifying

== Honours ==
Little was appointed Member of the Order of the British Empire (MBE) in the 2023 New Year Honours for services to association football.

Hibernian L.F.C.

- Scottish Premier League: 2006–07
- Scottish Women's Cup: 2006–07
- Scottish Premier League Cup: 2006–07

Arsenal W.F.C.

- Premier League National Division: 2008–09, 2009–10
- FA Women's Super League: 2011, 2012, 2018–19
- FA Cup: 2008–09, 2010–11, 2012–13; runners-up: 2009–10, 2017–18, 2020–21
- Premier League Cup: 2008–09
- WSL Cup / FA Women's League Cup: 2011, 2012, 2013, 2017–18, 2022–23, 2023–24; runners-up: 2018–19, 2019–20
- UEFA Women's Champions League: 2024–25
- FIFA Women's Champions Cup: 2026

Seattle Reign FC

- NWSL Championship Runners Up: 2014, 2015
- NWSL Shield (regular season winners): 2014, 2015

Melbourne City FC

- W-League Champions (Grand Final winners): 2015–16
- W-League Premiers (regular season winners): 2015–16

Individual

- BBC Women's Footballer of the Year: 2016 (winner), 2015 (nominee)
- PFA Women's Players' Player of the Year: 2013
- PFA WSL Team of the Year: 2018–19, 2019–20, 2021–22, 2024–25
- FA Women's Player of the Year: 2010
- FA Women's Cup Final Player of the Match: 2011
- NWSL Most Valuable Player: 2014
- NWSL Golden Boot: 2014
- NWSL Best XI: 2014, 2015
- NWSL Second XI: 2016
- NWSL Player of the Month: April 2014, May 2014, June 2014, June 2015
- NWSL Player of the Week: Week 19 (2015), Week 2 (2016), Week 3 (2016)
- W-League Player of Grand Final award: 2016

== See also ==
- List of women's footballers with 100 or more caps
- Scottish FA Women's International Roll of Honour
- List of Seattle Reign FC players
