= Jess Fishlock =

Welsh footballer and coach (born 1987)

Jess Fishlock MBE
- Fishlock with the Seattle Reign in 2026

Personal information
- Full name: Jessica Anne Fishlock
- Date of birth: 14 January 1987 (age 39)
- Place of birth: Cardiff, Wales
- Height: 1.58 m (5 ft 2 in)
- Position: Midfielder

Youth career
- Cardiff City
- Newport Strikers

Senior career*
Years	Team	Apps	(Gls)
2002–2007	Cardiff City		
2007–2008	Bristol Academy		
2008–2010	AZ	31	(6)
2011–2012	Bristol Academy	26	(7)
2012–2013	Melbourne Victory	18	(5)
2013–2026	Seattle Reign	232	(52)
2013	→ Glasgow City (loan)	6	(2)
2013–2014	→ Melbourne Victory (loan)	17	(5)
2014–2015	→ FFC Frankfurt (loan)	17	(2)
2015–2018	→ Melbourne City (loan)	38	(17)
2018–2019	→ Olympique Lyonnais (loan)	12	(1)
2020–2021	→ Reading (loan)	19	(2)

International career
2003-2006	Wales U19	15	(6)
2006–2025	Wales	167	(48)

Managerial career
- 2012: Cardiff City Ladies (player-coach)
- 2015–2016: Melbourne City (player-assistant coach)
- 2017: Melbourne City (player-head coach)
- 2017–2018: Melbourne City (player-assistant coach)
- * Club domestic league appearances and goals as of 16:33, 8 November 2026 (UTC)

Jessica Anne Fishlock MBE (born 14 January 1987) is a Welsh former professional footballer and coach who last played as a midfielder for Seattle Reign FC of the National Women's Soccer League (NWSL) and the Wales national team. She is Wales's all-time record goal scorer. She previously played for Bristol Academy in England's FA Women's Super League (FA WSL), AZ Alkmaar in the Dutch Eredivisie, Glasgow City FC in the Scottish Women's Premier League, Melbourne Victory and Melbourne City in Australia's W-League, as well as Bundesliga club FFC Frankfurt in Germany.

Fishlock was named Welsh Footballer of the Year in 2011, 2012, 2013, 2014, and 2019. She became the first Welsh player to earn 100 caps for the national team in April 2017. She has won multiple championships and regular season titles with the teams she has played for including the two consecutive Eredivisie championships, four W-League Grand Final championships, Scottish Women's Premier League and Scottish Women's Cup titles, and two consecutive NWSL Shield wins. Although Fishlock returned to Seattle prior to the 2015 UEFA Women's Champions League Final after playing on loan for FFC Frankfurt, her contributions to the team's journey to the title subsequently earned her a UEFA Women's Champions League medal. In 2021, she received the NWSL Most Valuable Player award with the Reign.

In February 2017, Fishlock coached Melbourne City to its second consecutive W-League Grand Final title. She previously coached Cardiff City Ladies F.C.

== Early life ==
Fishlock was born in Cardiff, Wales to Kevyn and Sharon Fishlock. She has two brothers and three sisters. As a child, she began playing football with her sister before joining Cardiff City Ladies F.C. at age 7. She later played for Newport Strikers.

== Club career ==
=== Cardiff City, 2002–2005 ===
Fishlock started her career playing for Cardiff City Ladies F.C. and made her debut for the senior side at age 15. Fishlock made her debut against Reading Royals on 29 September 2002 and scored 19 times in 23 appearances in her first season at the club. Laura McAllister, who was captain of Cardiff City when Fishlock joined the squad said, "Jess joined the junior team but she was so good we fast-tracked her. Jess is just a fabulous player. She is technically superb with fabulous skills and among the 2 or 3% in Britain. She's ambitious and adventurous and to be a top, top sports-player you've got to be like that."

At age 16, Fishlock was a member of the senior side that won the 2004–05 SW Combination League Championship without losing a point. The team later beat Everton en route to the last eight of the FA Cup and won the Welsh Cup to move on to the UEFA Women's Cup.

As of February 2013, Fishlock remained the club's record goalscorer.

=== AZ Alkmaar, 2008–2010 ===
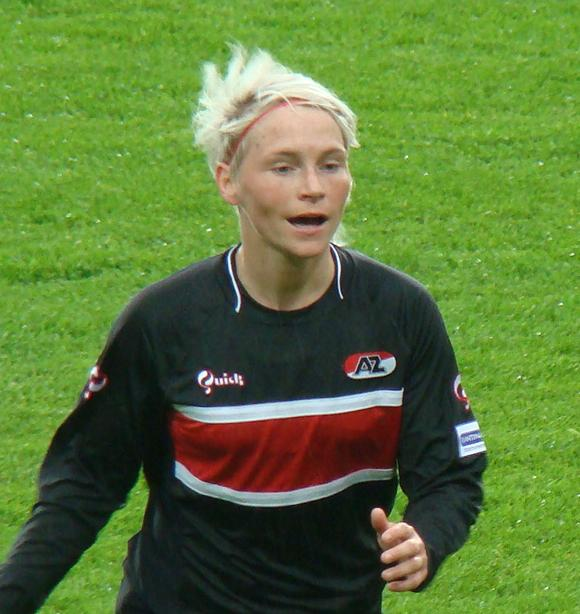
Fishlock playing for Dutch club AZ Alkmaar, May 2010

In 2008, the Dutch Champions AZ Alkmaar approached Jess to join them and become the first overseas player in the Eredivisie. Jess won back to back league titles during the 2008/2009 and 2009/2010 seasons, and was on track for a third straight title during the 2010/2011 season when she left to come back to the UK.

=== Bristol Academy, 2011–2012 ===
In 2011, Fishlock joined Bristol in England's FA Women's Super League (FA WSL). During the 2011 season, Bristol achieved a higher-than-expected final league position, and also reached the FA Cup Final where they were defeated by Arsenal 2–0. Fishlock was awarded the 2011 Club Player of the Year, 2011 Fans Player of the Year, and was named to the league's All-Star Team. She was named Welsh Women's Footballer of the Year the same year.

During the 2012 season, Bristol achieved their highest final league position, reached the semi-final of the FA Cup and Continental Cup. Jess was awarded the 2012 Club Players Player of Year, 2012 Fans Player of the Year and 2012 FA WSL Players Player of Year, voted on by managers and players of the FA WSL.

=== Melbourne Victory, 2012–2014 ===
In November 2012, Fishlock joined W-League side Melbourne Victory for six weeks on a guest player contract helping the team reach their first ever grand final. During the 94th minute of a match against former champions, Canberra United, she scored the game-winning goal boosting Melbourne to the top of the league table. During her six games with Melbourne, she became a favourite with the fans and was also nominated as one of four players for the league-wide Player of the Year Award.

In September 2013, it was announced that Fishlock would return to the Victory for the 2013/14 season on loan from the Seattle Reign FC. During her 11 appearances for the team, she scored three goals and helped lead the team to the Grand Final where the Victory defeated Brisbane Roar 2–0. Fishlock served an assist to Lisa De Vanna in the 38th minute for the game-winning goal. She was named Most Valuable Player of the Match. The win marked the Victory's first Grand Final title in the history of the team.

=== Seattle Reign, 2013–2026 ===
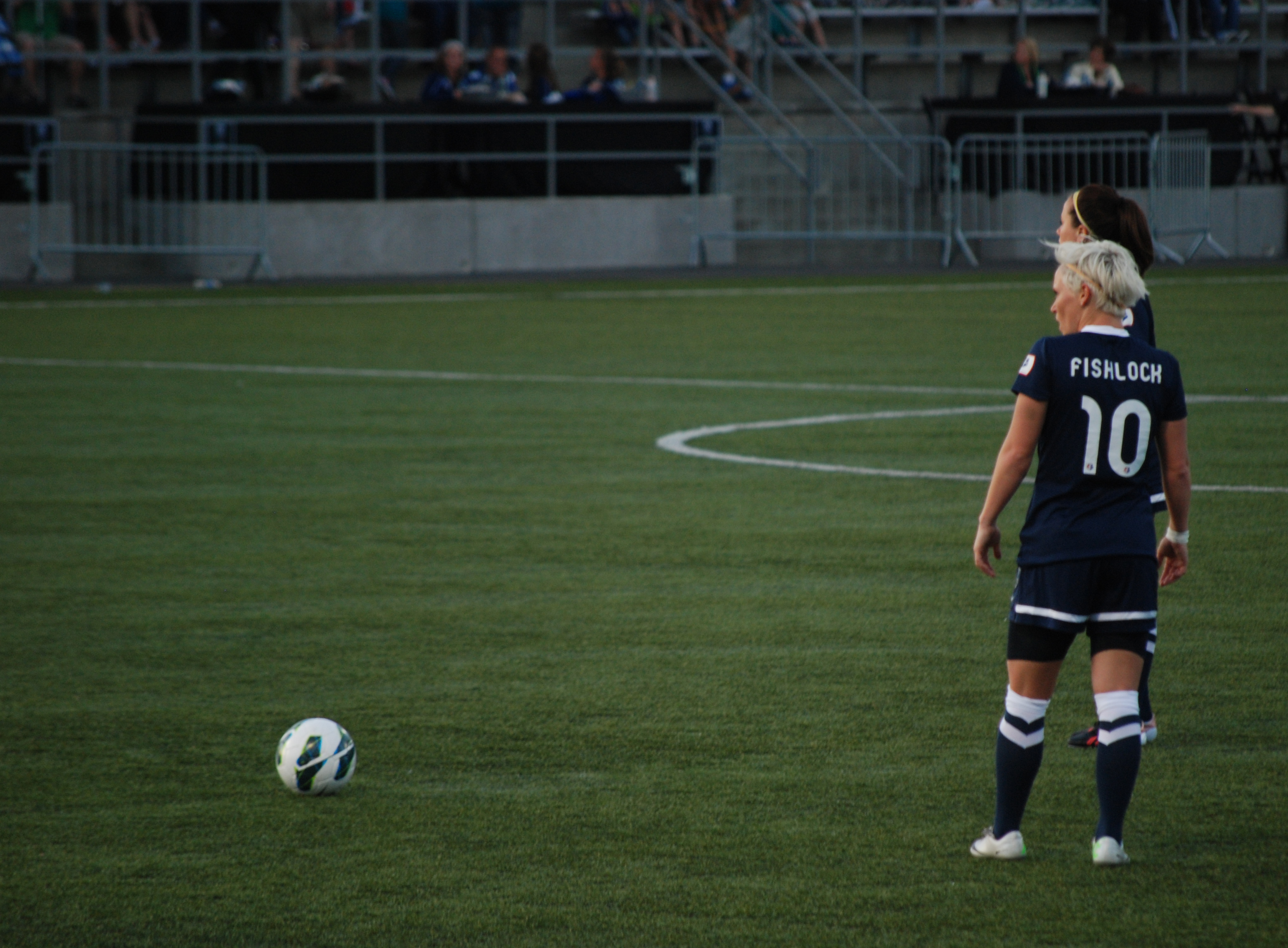
Fishlock during a match against FC Kansas City, 2013

In February 2013, Fishlock joined NWSL side Seattle Reign FC for the league's inaugural season. During their second league match against the Portland Thorns FC, Fishlock scored her first goal in front of a record-setting 16,479 fans at Jeld-Wen Field, establishing herself as a powerful force for the Reign. The media named her NWSL Player of the Week for Week 2 of the 2013 season. Fishlock started in all 21 games that she played during the regular season, missing only one game due to Wales national team commitments. She was a leading scorer on the team with four goals and tallied a total of 1,879 minutes.

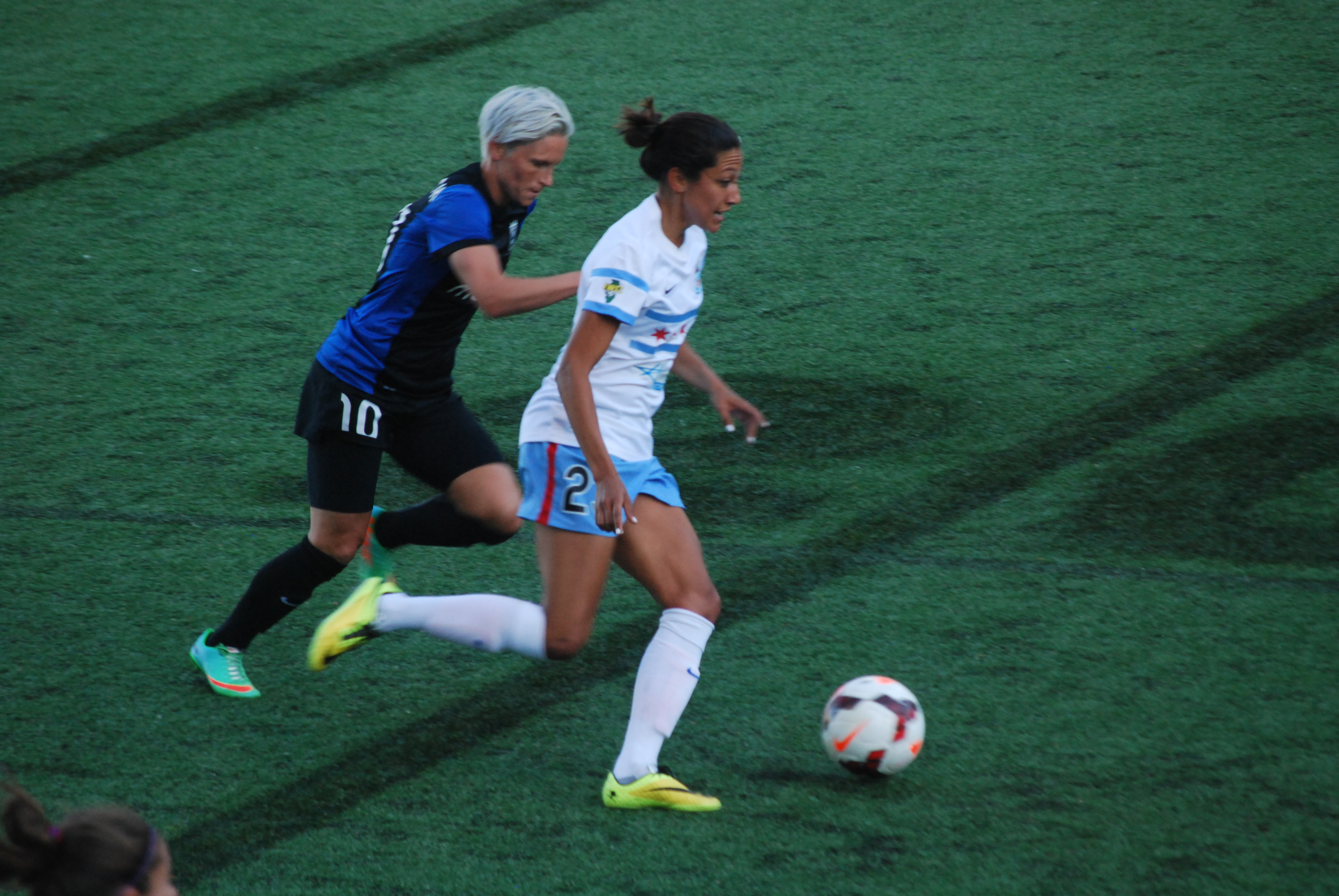
Fishlock defends against Christen Press, 2014

Fishlock returned to the Reign for the 2014 season. The team set a league record unbeaten streak of 16 games during the first part of the season. During the 16 game stretch, the Reign compiled a 13–0–3 record. The Reign finished first in the regular season clinching the NWSL Shield for the first time. After defeating the Washington Spirit 2–1 in the playoff semi-finals, the Reign were defeated 2–1 by FC Kansas City during the championship final. Following the regular season, Fishlock along with teammates Kendall Fletcher, Kim Little, and Nahomi Kawasumi was named to the league's Best XI team. Fishlock finished the 2014 season, having scored four goals and provided 8 assists. She started in all 22 matches in which she played.

During the 2015 season, Fishlock scored her first goal of the season during the team's home-opener against Western New York Flash. Her goal in the 25th minute was the first of the match and assist to Megan Rapinoe in the 86th minute contributed to a 5–1 win for the Reign. During a match against the Washington Spirit on 2 May, Fishlock scored a goal in the 75th minute off an assist from Kim Little resulting in a 3–1 win over the Spirit. During a match against Sky Blue FC in New Jersey, Fishlock received a controversial red card in the 90th minute that required her to sit out the team's next match against league-leading Chicago Red Stars. The controversy stemmed from a scrum in the box after a Sky Blue corner kick and Fishlock's last-minute save on the goal line. Fishlock stated the ball bounced off her head, but Sky Blue forward Nadia Nadim said she blocked it with her hand and the ref awarded Sky Blue the penalty kick. Both matches resulted in 1–1 draws. During the team's second match against Sky Blue FC in Seattle on 6 June, Fishlock scored a goal and an assist earning Player of the Match after leading Seattle to a 3–0 win. She was named NWSL Player of the Week by the media for the ninth week of the season. The Reign finished the regular season in first place clinching the NWSL Shield for the second consecutive time. After advancing to the playoffs, Seattle faced fourth-place team Washington Spirit and won 3–0, advancing to the championship final. Seattle was ultimately defeated 1–0 by FC Kansas City during the championship final in Portland. Fishlock, along with teammates Kim Little, Beverly Yanez, and Lauren Barnes were named to the NWSL Best XI team.

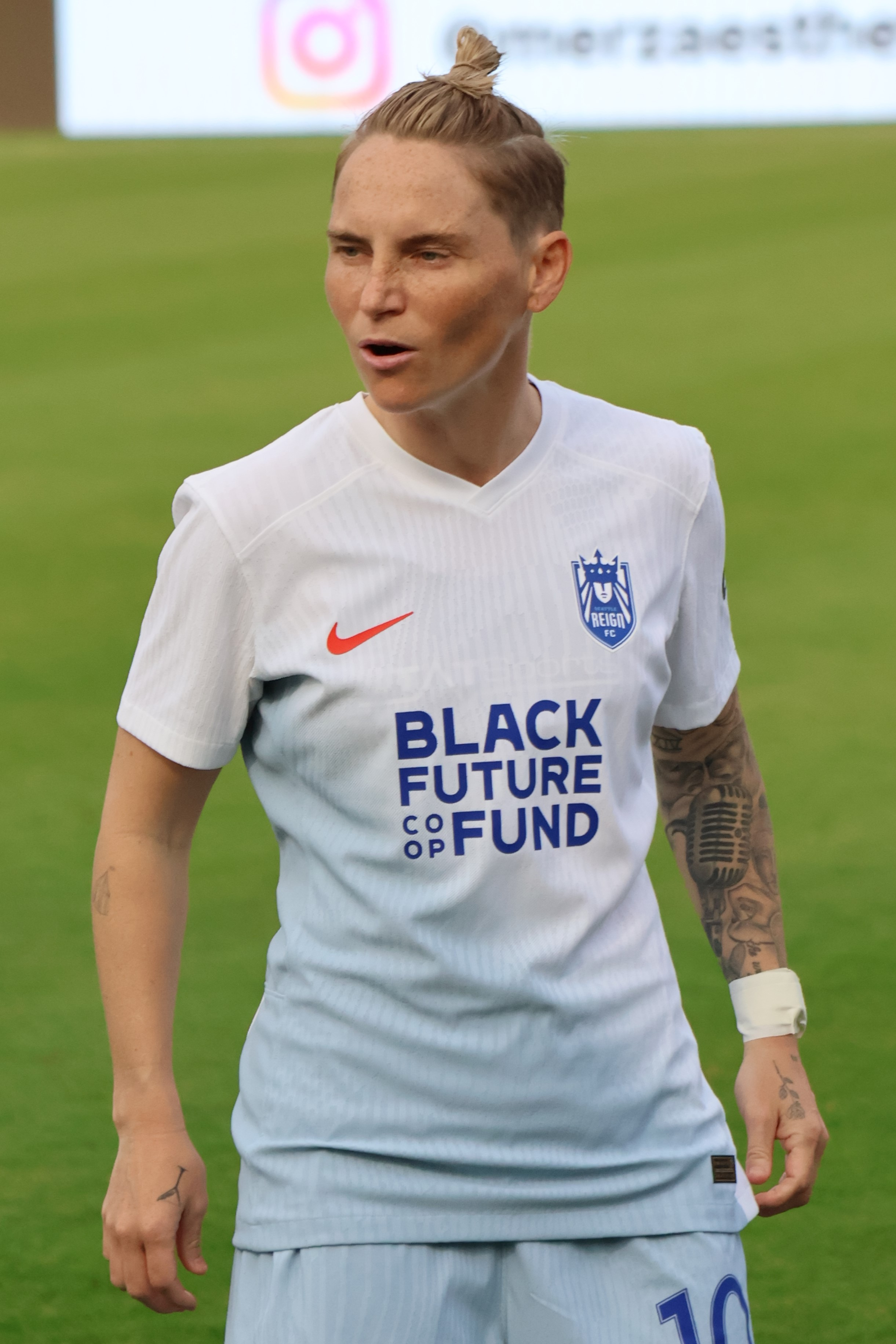
Fishlock with the Seattle Reign in 2024

During the first few months of the 2016 season, Fishlock was unavailable due to injury along with a number of offensive players, including forwards Manon Melis and Megan Rapinoe. Seattle finished the regular season in fifth place with a 8–6–8 record, narrowly missing a playoff spot by two points. Fishlock was named the NWSL Most Valuable Player during the 2021 season.

On 24 November 2025, Fishlock signed a new contract with the team to play until the end of 2026. She is the only player still with her original team from when the league launched in 2013. She announced her plan to retire at the end of the 2026 season on 21 April. Fishlock scored in a 2–1 win over Orlando Pride on 15 March 2026, in the Reign's opening game of the 2026 season, which was Fishlock's 13th NWSL season. On April 26, Fishlock suffered an ankle injury during a game and had to be stretchered off the field. She returned to play on 1 August, scoring the game-winning goal against Bay FC. Fishlock broke the Reign's goalscoring record on 25 September with a brace against Boston Legacy FC—her 51st and 52nd goals for the club. She made her final appearance on 8 November in the quarterfinals round of the playoffs, where the Reign lost away to NJ/NY Gotham FC.

==== Glasgow City loan ====
After the conclusion of the NWSL season in August 2013, it was announced that Fishlock would join Scottish Women's Premier League champions Glasgow City on loan until November 2013. Of her signing Glasgow City head coach Eddie Wolecki Black said, "This signing is significant, not only for the club but also the country. Whilst we continue to set new records at home, our aim is to make progress on the European stage and the signing of Jess highlights this. She will bring experience, versatility, pace and intelligence to the team and most importantly will raise the standard of the players around her. That's what top players do, they make good players better players both on and off the park." She scored two goals in her six appearances for the club helping the club finish in first place during the regular season and win the Scottish Women's Cup. She also competed in four matches in the 2013–14 UEFA Women's Champions League with the club reaching the Round of 8.

==== FFC Frankfurt loan ====
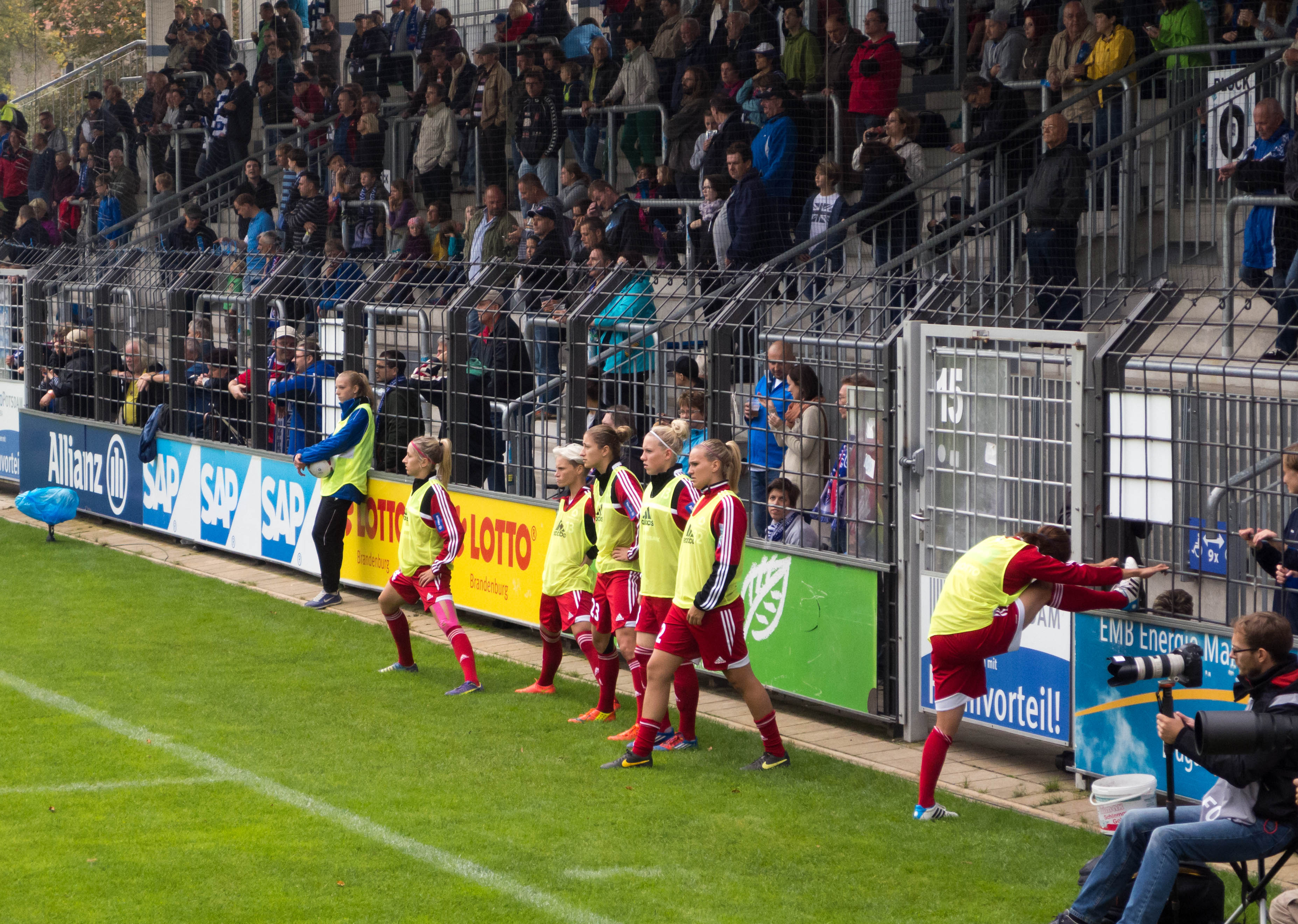
Fishlock (second player from left) warms up for FFC Frankfurt, September 2014

Fishlock spent the 2014–15 Seattle Reign FC off-season on loan in the Frauen-Bundesliga with FFC Frankfurt. She was a vital part of the team's success, starting in all available matches. Frankfurt was unbeaten in the second half of the season, a run which led them to be crowned the champions of Europe. Although Fishlock returned to Seattle prior to the 2015 UEFA Women's Champions League Final, she was considered a huge part of the team's journey to the championship title by players, staff and fans and subsequently earned a UEFA Women's Champions League medal.

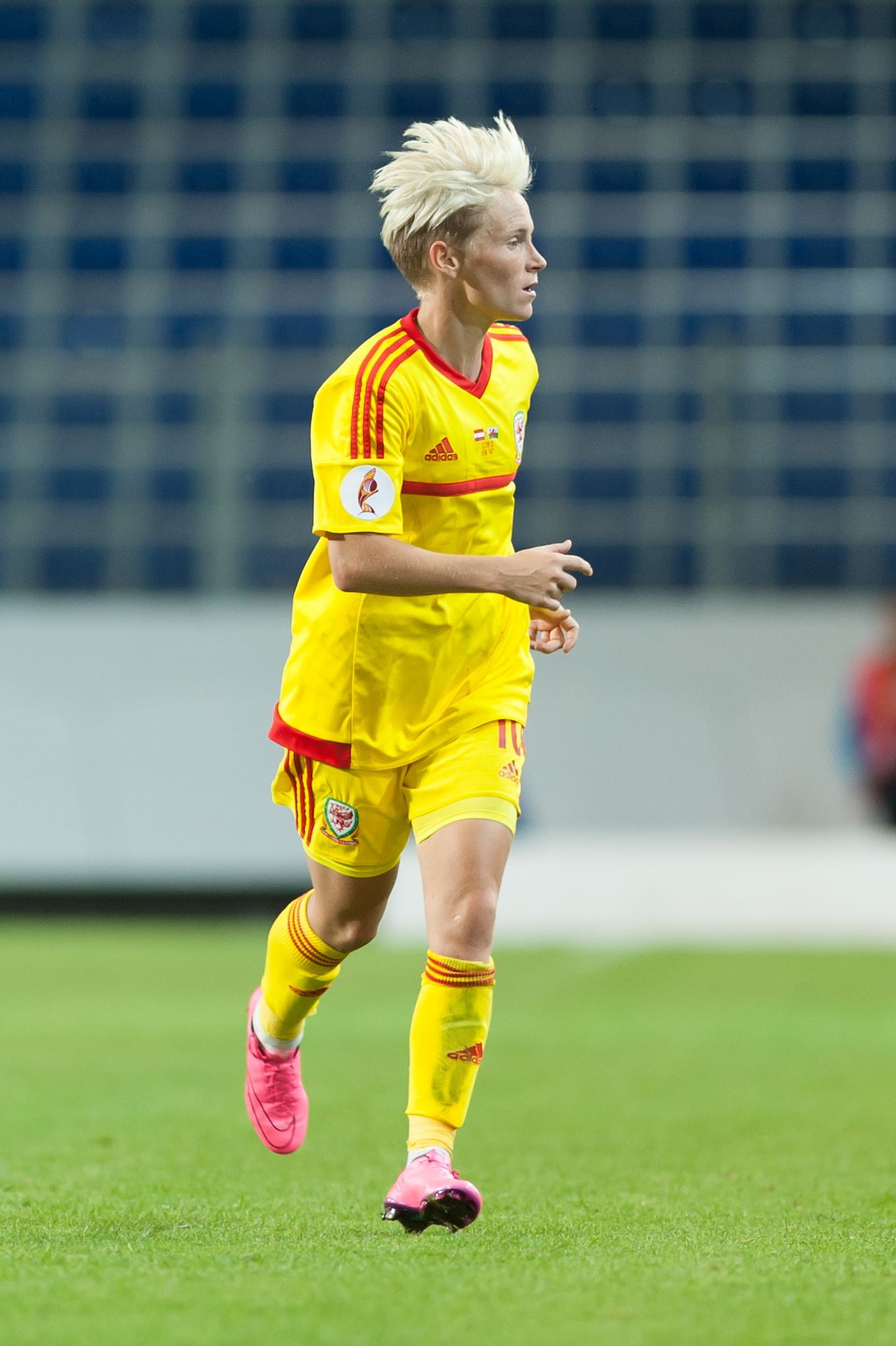
Fishlock playing for Wales, September 2015

==== Melbourne City loan ====
Fishlock played on loan for Melbourne City FC in the Australian W-League during the 2015-16, 2016-17, and 2017-18 seasons. During the club's inaugural season in 2015-16, Fishlock was a starting midfielder and helped the new expansion team win a historic Premiership and Championship double. Fishlock worked as a player-assistant coach during the season. After returning on loan the following season, Fishlock helped the club win the first-ever consecutive W-League titles. During the 2017-18 season, Fishlock was instrumental in City winning its third consecutive championship title and was named Player of the Match.

==== Reading loan ====
On 19 August 2020, it was confirmed that Fishlock had joined Reading Women on loan from Seattle Reign FC. The deal was signed as doubts remained about when the NWSL would resume. During a match against Brighton & Hove Albion, she scored two goals lifting Reading to a 3–1 win.

== International career ==
Fishlock made her debut for the U-19 national team at age 16. After captaining the U–19 team, she was called up to the senior national team and made her debut against Switzerland in 2006. She captained the senior team from 2012 to 2015. After a 1–0 win over Mexico during Wales' first match at the 2013 Algarve Cup, Fishlock scored the game-winning goal of the match during the 11th minute. After Wales tied Hungary 1–1 on 11 March 2013, the team faced Portugal in the knockout stage. Fishlock scored Wales only goal in the 77th minute. Portugal scored an equalizing goal in the 93rd-minute leading to penalty kicks to determine the victor. Portugal won after scoring three penalty kicks over Wales' one.

In February 2015, incoming Welsh manager Jayne Ludlow unveiled her squad for the 2015 Istria Cup which did not feature long-time captain Fishlock. Two months later, she was re-called to the team.

On 5 April 2017, Fishlock became the first Welsh player to earn 100 caps for the national team.

On 9 April 2024, Fishlock became the first Welsh player to earn 150 caps for the national team. As of June 2025, she is currently the most capped Cymru player with 162 caps to her name.

On 14 July 2024 - with her goal against Kosovo marking her 45th goal for Wales - she became the Welsh national team's all–time record goal scorer, surpassing previous record holder Helen Ward. As of June 2025, she currently holds the record with 47 goals.

In June 2025, Fishlock was named in Wales' squad for their first major international tournament, UEFA Women's Euro 2025. She scored Wales' first ever goal at a major tournament during the second group game in a 4–1 loss to France. In doing so, she became the oldest goalscorer in European Championship history.

On 15 October 2025, Fishlock announced that she would retire from international football after Wales' game against Australia later that month.

== Coaching career ==
In 2012, Fishlock was the first team coach for her former team, Cardiff City Ladies FC, alongside Manager Jamie Sherwood.

In Melbourne City FC's inaugural season in 2015–16, Fishlock was a player-assistant coach alongside head coach Joe Montemurro. She returned in the same role for the 2016–17 season.

Midway through City's 2016–17 season, head coach Joe Montemurro became the chief assistant coach of Melbourne City men's team, and Fishlock was promoted to player-head coach. In February 2017, she coached Melbourne City to its second consecutive W-League Grand Final title and scored a goal in the 2–0 win over Perth Glory. With the win, she became the first player-coach to win the league title in the W-League's history.

In October 2017, Melbourne City FC announced that Fishlock would be returning for the 2017–18 season as a player-assistant coach.

Following her retirement from playing internationally in October 2025, on 18 February 2026, it was announced that Fishlock was joining the Welsh coaching staff as a technical assistant ahead of their 3 March 2027 World Cup qualifying game against the Czech Republic, with head coach Rhian Wilkinson saying "Jess is still a player for Seattle and she's just retired from the national team so she will be eased into it. In that way, it's slightly different than the other technical staff, but she will be putting in a shift for sure."

== Personal life, other work, and endorsements ==
Fishlock has stated she knew she was a lesbian at the age of 12, and was bullied at school for her sexuality.

Fishlock has been featured in a column for BBC Sport since 2013. She gave an interview in October 2015, during which she described her struggles as a high-profile gay athlete. Demanding greater "respect", she railed against social media homophobia and threw her weight behind the work of Athlete Ally.

Fishlock appeared in an advertisement for Adidas in 2016 along with Becky Sauerbrunn. She had an endorsement deal with natural sports beverage company, Golazo, Inc. prior to the company folding.

In the 2018 Birthday Honours, Fishlock was appointed a Member of the Order of the British Empire (MBE) "for services to women's football and the LGBT community." Fishlock officially received her MBE from The Prince of Wales in a ceremony at Buckingham Palace in December 2018. In December 2020, she was named to the Stonewall Sports Champion Team.

In October 2022, she and fellow Seattle Reign FC player Tziarra King announced their engagement. On 12 December 2023, they married in Wales.

On 31 December 2025 she was the mystery runner in the annual Nos Galan road race in Mountain Ash, Rhondda Cynon Taf.

Fishlock is an ambassador for the 2027 EuroGames scheduled to be held in Cardiff, with Fishlock saying of her involvement "It feels right to be part of this. It feels relevant to who I am as a human being, and to create awareness of these athletes and their lives. And enjoyment is key to this as well - I want to be on the side which is celebrating these athletes."

== Career statistics ==
=== International goals ===
As of matches played June 2025

No.	Date	Venue	Opponent	Score	Result	Competition
1.	30 March 2006	Ninian Park, Cardiff, Wales	Israel	1–1	1–1	2007 FIFA Women's World Cup qualification
2.	20 August 2006	Mandemakers Stadion, Waalwijk, Netherlands	Israel	2–0	3–1	2007 FIFA Women's World Cup qualification
3.	26 August 2006	Kadriorg Stadium, Tallinn, Estonia	Estonia	3–0	7–0	2007 FIFA Women's World Cup qualification
4.	26 August 2006	Kadriorg Stadium, Tallinn, Estonia	Estonia	4–0	7–0	2007 FIFA Women's World Cup qualification
5.	30 September 2008	Stade Alphonse Theis, Hesperange, Luxembourg	Luxembourg	5–?	6–1	Friendly
6.	4 March 2009	Restinga Stadium, Alvor, Portugal	Austria	1–0	1–2	2009 Algarve Cup
7.	11 March 2009	CD Montechoro, Albufeira, Portugal	Poland	1–1	1–2	2009 Algarve Cup
8.	23 September 2009	Stebonheath Park, Llanelli, Wales	Czech Republic	1–0	2–0	2011 FIFA Women's World Cup qualification
9.	25 October 2009	Ďolíček Stadion, Prague, Czech Republic	Czech Republic	1–1	1–2	2011 FIFA Women's World Cup qualification
10.	21 August 2010	Latham Park, Newtown, Wales	Azerbaijan	8–0	15–0	2011 FIFA Women's World Cup qualification
11.	24 November 2010	The Rock, Rhosymedre, Wales	Bulgaria	1–0	8–1	Friendly
12.	4 March 2011	Municipal Stadium, Lagos, Portugal	Romania	1–1	2–1	2011 Algarve Cup
13.	7 March 2011	Estádio Algarve, Faro, Portugal	Chile	1–0	2–1	2011 Algarve Cup
14.	7 March 2011	Estádio Algarve, Faro, Portugal	Chile	2–0	2–1	2011 Algarve Cup
15.	19 July 2012	Stebonheath Park, Llanelli, Wales	North Korea	1–0	2–4	Friendly
16.	19 July 2012	Stebonheath Park, Llanelli, Wales	North Korea	2–3	2–4	Friendly
17.	8 August 2012	Bielmontstadion, Verviers, Belgium	Belgium	5–1	5–3	Friendly
18.	19 January 2013	Aigeira Municipal Stadium, Glyfada, Greece	Greece	1–0	3–0	Friendly
19.	19 January 2013	Aigeira Municipal Stadium, Glyfada, Greece	Greece	3–0	3–0	Friendly
20.	8 March 2013	Municipal Stadium, Antonio, Portugal	Mexico	1–0	1–0	2013 Algarve Cup
21.	13 March 2013	Stadium Bela Vista, Parchal, Portugal	Portugal	1–0	1–1 (a.e.t.) (1–3 p)	2013 Algarve Cup
22.	17 June 2013	NTC Senec, Senec, Slovakia	Slovakia	1–0	2–2	Friendly
23.	4 April 2014	Eskişehir Atatürk Stadium, Eskişehir, Turkey	Turkey	1–0	6–1	2015 FIFA Women's World Cup qualification
24.	4 April 2014	Eskişehir Atatürk Stadium, Eskişehir, Turkey	Turkey	2–0	6–1	2015 FIFA Women's World Cup qualification
25.	4 April 2014	Eskişehir Atatürk Stadium, Eskişehir, Turkey	Turkey	4–0	6–1	2015 FIFA Women's World Cup qualification
26.	8 May 2014	Nantporth, Bangor, Wales	Montenegro	2–0	4–0	2015 FIFA Women's World Cup qualification
27.	8 May 2014	Nantporth, Bangor, Wales	Montenegro	3–0	4–0	2015 FIFA Women's World Cup qualification
28.	8 May 2014	Nantporth, Bangor, Wales	Montenegro	4–0	4–0	2015 FIFA Women's World Cup qualification
29.	5 April 2017	CCB Centre for Sporting Excellence, Ystrad Mynach, Wales	Northern Ireland	2–1	3–1	Friendly
30.	17 September 2017	Astana Arena, Nur-Sultan, Kazakhstan	Kazakhstan	1–0	1–0	2019 FIFA Women's World Cup qualification
31.	1 December 2020	Rodney Parade, Newport, Wales	Belarus	3–0	3–0	UEFA Women's Euro 2022 qualifying
32.	13 April 2021	Cardiff City Stadium, Cardiff, Wales	Denmark	1–1	1–1	Friendly
33.	16 February 2022	Pinatar Arena, San Pedro del Pinatar, Spain	Scotland	1–1	3–1	2022 Pinatar Cup
34.	16 February 2022	Pinatar Arena, San Pedro del Pinatar, Spain	Scotland	2–1	3–1	2022 Pinatar Cup
35.	12 April 2022	Astana Arena, Nur-Sultan, Kazakhstan	Kazakhstan	3–0	3–0	2023 FIFA Women's World Cup qualification
36.	6 October 2022	Cardiff City Stadium, Cardiff, Wales	Bosnia and Herzegovina	1–0	1–0	2023 FIFA Women's World Cup qualification – UEFA play-offs
37.	6 April 2023	Cardiff City Stadium, Cardiff, Wales	Northern Ireland	1–0	4–1	Friendly
38.	26 September 2023	Cardiff City Stadium, Cardiff, Wales	Denmark	1–2	1–5	2023–24 UEFA Women's Nations League
39.	31 October 2023	Viborg Stadium, Viborg, Denmark	Denmark	1–2	1–2	2023–24 UEFA Women's Nations League
40.	27 February 2024	Tallaght Stadium, Tallaght, Ireland	Republic of Ireland	1–0	2–0	Friendly
41.	5 April 2024	Racecourse Ground, Wrexham, Wales	Croatia	1–0	4–0	UEFA Women's Euro 2025 qualifying
42.	5 April 2024	Racecourse Ground, Wrexham, Wales	Croatia	2–0	4–0	UEFA Women's Euro 2025 qualifying
43.	4 June 2024	Stadion Dyskobolii, Grodzisk Wielkopolski, Poland	Ukraine	2–1	2–2	UEFA Women's Euro 2025 qualifying
44.	12 July 2024	Stadion Branko Čavlović-Čavlek, Karlovac, Croatia	Croatia	1–0	3–0	UEFA Women's Euro 2025 qualifying
45.	16 July 2024	Parc y Scarlets, Llanelli, Wales	Kosovo	1–0	2–0	UEFA Women's Euro 2025 qualifying
46.	29 October 2024	Cardiff City Stadium, Cardiff, Wales	Slovakia	1–0	2–0	UEFA Women's Euro 2025 qualifying play-offs
47.	3 June 2025	Swansea.com Stadium, Swansea, Wales	Italy	1–4	1–4	2025 UEFA Women's Nations League
48.	9 July 2025	Kybunpark, St. Gallen, Switzerland	France	1–1	1–4	UEFA Women's Euro 2025

== Honours ==
=== Player ===
AZ Alkmaar

- Eredivisie: 2008–09, 2009–10

Bristol Academy

- FA Cup runner-up: 2010–11

Melbourne Victory

- W-League Championship: 2013–14; runner-up: 2012–13
- W-League Premiership: 2013–14

Seattle Reign FC

- NWSL Shield: 2014, 2015, 2022
- NWSL Championship runner-up: 2014, 2015, 2023
- The Women's Cup: 2022

FFC Frankfurt

- UEFA Women's Champions League: 2014–15

Melbourne City

- W-League Championship: 2015–16, 2016–17, 2017–18
- W-League Premiership: 2015–16

Lyon

- Division 1 Féminine: 2018–19
- Coupe de France: 2018–19
- UEFA Women's Champions League: 2018–19

Individual

- FA WSL Club Player of the Year: 2011
- FA WSL Fans Player of the Year: 2011, 2012
- FA WSL Club Players' Player of the Year: 2012
- FA WSL Players' Player of the Year: 2012
- NWSL Most Valuable Player: 2021
- NWSL Best XI: 2013, 2014, 2015, 2017, 2021
- NWSL Second XI: 2016
- NWSL Team of the Month: 2x 2017
- NWSL Player of the Week: 2013, 2015, 2x 2017)
- W-League Best XI: 2012
- W-League Grand Final: Player of the Match: 2013 & 2017
- W-League League Players Player of the Year: 2013
- W-League Club Players Player of the Year: 2013
- Welsh Footballer of the Year: 2011, 2012, 2013, 2014, 2018

=== Manager ===
Melbourne City

- W-League Championship: 2016–17

== See also ==
- List of footballers with 100 or more caps
- List of Melbourne Victory FC (A-League Women) players
- List of foreign W-League (Australia) players
- W-League records and statistics
- List of foreign NWSL players
- List of sportswomen
