= NWSL Player of the Week =

Award given weekly during the season to a player in the National Women's Soccer League

The National Women's Soccer League Player of the Week is a weekly soccer award given to individual players in the National Women's Soccer League (NWSL). The honor is awarded by popular social media vote to the player deemed to have put in the best performances over the past week. The award has existed since the league's inception in 2013. In 2024, it was replaced by the Goal of the Week, but it was brought back in 2025.

== Selection ==
From 2013 to 2022, the winner was selected by the NWSL Media Association, an organization of journalists who regularly cover the league. Since week 2 of the 2022 NWSL season, the winner was selected by the results of a Twitter poll posted by the league.

== Winners ==
=== 2013 ===
Week	Nat.	Player	Club	Ref.
1	(United States)	Brittany Cameron	Sky Blue FC (Note: NJ/NY Gotham FC was previously known as Sky Blue FC.)	
2	(Wales)	Jess Fishlock	Seattle Reign FC (Note: Seattle Reign FC was previously known as Reign FC and OL Reign.)	
3	(United States)	Heather O'Reilly	Boston Breakers	
4	(United States)	Sydney Leroux	Boston Breakers	
5	(United States)	Abby Wambach	Western New York Flash	
6	(United States)	Christie Rampone	Sky Blue FC	
7	(England)	Lianne Sanderson	Boston Breakers	
8	(Australia)	Lisa De Vanna	Sky Blue FC	
9	(United States)	Abby Wambach (2)	Western New York Flash	
10	(United States)	Lori Chalupny	Chicago Red Stars	
11	(Canada)	Karina LeBlanc	Portland Thorns FC	
12	(United States)	Carli Lloyd	Western New York Flash	
13	(United States)	Sydney Leroux (2)	Boston Breakers	
14	(Canada)	Karina LeBlanc (2)	Portland Thorns FC	
15	(United States)	Erika Tymrak	FC Kansas City	
16	(United States)	Megan Rapinoe	Seattle Reign FC	
17	(United States)	Lauren Cheney	FC Kansas City	
18	(Canada)	Diana Matheson	Washington Spirit	
19	(United States)	Jen Hoy	Chicago Red Stars	

=== 2014 ===
Week	Nat.	Player	Club	Ref.
1	(Spain)	Vicky Losada	Western New York Flash	
2	(Mexico)	Teresa Noyola	Houston Dash	
3	(England)	Lianne Sanderson	Boston Breakers	
4	(United States)	Sydney Leroux	Seattle Reign FC	
5	(United States)	Amy Rodriguez	FC Kansas City	
6	(England)	Jodie Taylor	Washington Spirit	
7	(United States)	Kelley O'Hara	Sky Blue FC	
8	(United States)	Jazmine Reeves	Boston Breakers	
9	(Australia)	Sam Kerr	Western New York Flash	
10	(Spain)	Verónica Boquete	Portland Thorns FC	
11	(United States)	Alex Morgan	Portland Thorns FC	
12	(United States)	Carli Lloyd	Western New York Flash	
13	(Japan)	Nahomi Kawasumi	Seattle Reign FC	
14	(Spain)	Verónica Boquete (2)	Portland Thorns FC	
15	(Canada)	Christine Sinclair	Portland Thorns FC	
16	(Japan)	Nahomi Kawasumi (2)	Seattle Reign FC	
17	(Spain)	Verónica Boquete (3)	Portland Thorns FC	
18	(United States)	Alyssa Naeher	Boston Breakers	
19	(Denmark)	Nadia Nadim	Sky Blue FC	

=== 2015 ===
Week	Nat.	Player	Club	Ref.
1	(United States)	Megan Rapinoe	Seattle Reign FC	
2	(United States)	Christen Press	Chicago Red Stars	
3	(United States)	Crystal Dunn	Washington Spirit	
4	(United States)	Becky Edwards	Western New York Flash	
5	(United States)	Sofia Huerta	Chicago Red Stars	
6	(United States)	Sofia Huerta (2)	Chicago Red Stars	
7	(Mexico)	Bianca Henninger	Houston Dash	
8	(United States)	Crystal Dunn (2)	Washington Spirit	
9	(Wales)	Jess Fishlock	Seattle Reign FC	
10	(United States)	Michelle Betos	Portland Thorns FC	
11	(United States)	Crystal Dunn (3)	Washington Spirit	
12	(United States)	Sinead Farrelly	Portland Thorns FC	
13	(United States)	Shea Groom	FC Kansas City	
14	(Australia)	Michelle Heyman	Western New York Flash	
15	(United States)	Beverly Yanez	Seattle Reign FC	
16	(United States)	Crystal Dunn (4)	Washington Spirit	
17	(United States)	Alyssa Naeher	Boston Breakers	
18	(United States)	Crystal Dunn (5)	Washington Spirit	
19	(Scotland)	Kim Little	Seattle Reign FC	
20	(United States)	Crystal Dunn (6)	Washington Spirit	
21	(Canada)	Karina LeBlanc	Chicago Red Stars	

=== 2016 ===
Week	Nat.	Player	Club	Ref.
1	(England)	Rachel Daly	Houston Dash	
2	(Scotland)	Kim Little	Seattle Reign FC	
3	(Scotland)	Kim Little (2)	Seattle Reign FC	
4	(England)	Chioma Ubogagu	Houston Dash	
5	(United States)	Alyssa Naeher	Chicago Red Stars	
6	(United States)	Tobin Heath	Portland Thorns FC	
7	(United States)	Lynn Williams (Note: Lynn Biyendolo, née Lynn Williams.)	Western New York Flash	
8	(United States)	Britt Eckerstrom	Western New York Flash	
9	(United States)	Sofia Huerta	Chicago Red Stars	
10	(United States)	Jessica McDonald	Western New York Flash	
11	(Japan)	Nahomi Kawasumi	Seattle Reign FC	
12	(United States)	Kristen Edmonds	Orlando Pride	
13	(Argentina)	Estefanía Banini	Washington Spirit	
14	(United States)	Nicole Barnhart	FC Kansas City	
15	(United States)	Kealia Ohai (Note: Kealia Watt, née Kealia Ohai.)	Houston Dash	
16	(Netherlands)	Manon Melis	Seattle Reign FC	
17	(United States)	Kealia Ohai (2)	Houston Dash	
18	(Australia)	Sam Kerr	Sky Blue FC	
19	(United States)	Allie Long	Portland Thorns FC	

=== 2017 ===
Week	Nat.	Player	Club	Ref.
1	(United States)	Haley Kopmeyer	Seattle Reign FC	
2	(Wales)	Jess Fishlock	Seattle Reign FC	
3	(Canada)	Adriana Leon	Boston Breakers	
4	(Nigeria)	Francisca Ordega	Washington Spirit	
5	(Japan)	Nahomi Kawasumi	Seattle Reign FC	
6	(United States)	Christen Press	Chicago Red Stars	
7	(United States)	Sydney Leroux	FC Kansas City	
8	(United States)	Lindsey Horan (Note: Lindsey Heaps, née Lindsey Horan.)	Portland Thorns FC	
9	(Australia)	Sam Kerr	Sky Blue FC	
10	(Brazil)	Poliana	Houston Dash	
11	(United States)	Megan Rapinoe	Seattle Reign FC	
12	(Australia)	Sam Kerr (2)	Sky Blue FC	
13	(Brazil)	Andressinha	Houston Dash	
14	(United States)	Megan Rapinoe (2)	Seattle Reign FC	
15	(United States)	Arielle Ship	Washington Spirit	
16	(United States)	Sam Mewis	North Carolina Courage	
17	(Australia)	Sam Kerr (3)	Sky Blue FC	
18	(Australia)	Hayley Raso	Portland Thorns FC	
19	(United States)	Shea Groom	FC Kansas City	
20	(United States)	Whitney Church	Washington Spirit	
21	(Canada)	Adriana Leon (2)	Boston Breakers	
22	(Wales)	Jess Fishlock (2)	Seattle Reign FC	

=== 2018 ===
Week	Nat.	Player	Club	Ref.
1	(United States)	Megan Rapinoe	Seattle Reign FC	
2	(United States)	Mallory Pugh (Note: Mallory Swanson, née Mallory Pugh.)	Washington Spirit	
3	(United States)	McCall Zerboni	North Carolina Courage	
4	(United States)	Sofia Huerta	Chicago Red Stars	
5	(United States)	McCall Zerboni (2)	North Carolina Courage	
6	(United States)	Alyssa Naeher	Chicago Red Stars	
7	(United States)	Megan Rapinoe (2)	Seattle Reign FC	
8	(United States)	Crystal Dunn	North Carolina Courage	
9	(England)	Rachel Daly	Houston Dash	
10	(Japan)	Yūki Nagasato	Chicago Red Stars	
11/12	(United States)	Aubrey Bledsoe (Note: Aubrey Kingsbury, née Aubrey Bledsoe.)	Washington Spirit	
13	(United States)	Crystal Dunn (2)	North Carolina Courage	
14	(United States)	Adrianna Franch	Portland Thorns FC	
15	(Australia)	Sam Kerr	Chicago Red Stars	
16	(United States)	Lynn Williams	North Carolina Courage	
17	(United States)	Jane Campbell	Houston Dash	
19	(United States)	Lynn Williams (2)	North Carolina Courage	
20	(United States)	Adrianna Franch (2)	Portland Thorns FC	
21	(Mexico)	Katie Johnson	Sky Blue FC	
22	(Australia)	Sam Kerr (2)	Chicago Red Stars	
24	(United States)	Lindsey Horan	Portland Thorns FC	

=== 2019 ===
Week	Nat.	Player	Club	Ref.
1	(United States)	Tobin Heath	Portland Thorns FC	
2	(Canada)	Christine Sinclair	Portland Thorns FC	
3	(Japan)	Yūki Nagasato	Chicago Red Stars	
4	(United States)	Aubrey Bledsoe	Washington Spirit	
5	(Australia)	Sam Kerr	Chicago Red Stars	
6	(Australia)	Sam Kerr (2)	Chicago Red Stars	
7	(United States)	Aubrey Bledsoe (2)	Washington Spirit	
8	(United States)	Kristen Hamilton	North Carolina Courage	
9	(Wales)	Jess Fishlock	Reign FC	
10	(Nigeria)	Ifeoma Onumonu	Reign FC	
11	(Australia)	Sam Kerr (3)	Chicago Red Stars	
12	(United States)	Kristen Hamilton (2)	North Carolina Courage	
13	(Brazil)	Marta	Orlando Pride	
14	(Australia)	Sam Kerr (4)	Chicago Red Stars	
15	(United States)	Kristen Hamilton (3)	North Carolina Courage	
16	(Australia)	Sam Kerr (5)	Chicago Red Stars	
17	(United States)	Christen Press	Utah Royals FC	
18	(United States)	Paige Monaghan	Sky Blue FC	
19	(United States)	Midge Purce	Portland Thorns FC	
20	(United States)	Crystal Thomas	Washington Spirit	
21	(United States)	Darian Jenkins	Reign FC	
22	(United States)	Lynn Williams	North Carolina Courage	
23	(Australia)	Sam Kerr (6)	Chicago Red Stars	
24	(England)	Jodie Taylor	Reign FC	
25	(United States)	Jessica McDonald	North Carolina Courage	

=== 2020 ===
The 2020 NWSL regular season was cancelled due to the COVID-19 pandemic.

=== 2021 Challenge Cup ===
Week	Nat.	Player	Club	Ref.
1	None awarded			
2	(United States)	Ashlyn Harris	Orlando Pride	
3	(United States)	Kristie Mewis	Houston Dash	
4	(Spain)	Celia	OL Reign	
5	(United States)	Adrianna Franch	Portland Thorns FC	

=== 2021 ===
Week	Nat.	Player	Club	Ref.
1	(United States)	Midge Purce	NJ/NY Gotham FC	
2	(United States)	Emina Ekic	Racing Louisville FC	
3	(United States)	Mallory Pugh	Chicago Red Stars	
4	(United States)	Lindsey Horan	Portland Thorns FC	
5	(United States)	Michelle Betos	Racing Louisville FC	
6	(United States)	Lynn Williams	North Carolina Courage	
7	(Jamaica)	Havana Solaun	North Carolina Courage	
8	(United States)	Ashley Hatch	Washington Spirit	
9	(United States)	Mallory Pugh (2)	Chicago Red Stars	
10	(United States)	Tziarra King	OL Reign	
11	(France)	Eugénie Le Sommer	OL Reign	
12	(United States)	Bethany Balcer	OL Reign	
13	(Nigeria)	Ifeoma Onumonu	NJ/NY Gotham FC	
14	(United States)	Megan Rapinoe	OL Reign	
15	(United States)	Sarah Woldmoe	Chicago Red Stars	
16	(United States)	Bethany Balcer (2)	OL Reign	
17	(United States)	Sydney Leroux	Orlando Pride	
18	(France)	Eugénie Le Sommer (2)	OL Reign	
19	Games postponed			
20	(England)	Rachel Daly	Houston Dash	
21	(United States)	Midge Purce (2)	NJ/NY Gotham FC	
22	(France)	Eugénie Le Sommer (3)	OL Reign	

=== 2022 Challenge Cup ===
Week	Nat.	Player	Club	Ref.
1	(United States)	Mallory Pugh	Chicago Red Stars	
2	(Mexico)	María Sánchez	Houston Dash	
3	(United States)	Alex Morgan	San Diego Wave FC	
4	(Japan)	Hina Sugita	Portland Thorns FC	
5	(United States)	Elyse Bennett	Kansas City Current	

=== 2022 ===
Week	Player of the Week			Runner-up			Reference
Week	Nat.	Player	Club	Nat.	Player	Club	Reference
1	(Japan)	Jun Endo	Angel City FC	None			
2	(United States)	Alex Morgan	San Diego Wave FC	(United States)	Tziarra King	OL Reign	
3	(United States)	Christen Press	Angel City FC	(United States)	Elyse Bennett	Kansas City Current	
4	(United States)	Mallory Pugh	Chicago Red Stars	(United States)	Katie Lund	Racing Louisville FC	
5	(United States)	Sofia Huerta	OL Reign	(Nigeria)	Ifeoma Onumonu	NJ/NY Gotham FC	
6	(Canada)	Nichelle Prince	Houston Dash	(Canada)	Christine Sinclair	Portland Thorns FC	
7	(United States)	Taylor Kornieck (Note: Taylor Flint, née Taylor Kornieck.)	San Diego Wave FC	(United States)	Sophia Smith (Note: Sophia Wilson, née Sophia Smith.)	Portland Thorns FC	
8	(United States)	Alex Morgan (2)	San Diego Wave FC	(United States)	Sophia Smith	Portland Thorns FC	
9	(Wales)	Jess Fishlock	OL Reign	(United States)	Ella Stevens	Chicago Red Stars	
10	(United States)	Adrianna Franch	Kansas City Current	(United States)	Taylor Smith	NJ/NY Gotham FC	
11	(England)	Ebony Salmon	Houston Dash	(United States)	Morgan Weaver	Portland Thorns FC	
12	(United States)	Sofia Huerta (2)	OL Reign	(Canada)	Kailen Sheridan	San Diego Wave FC	
13	(United States)	Sophia Smith	Portland Thorns FC	(England)	Ebony Salmon	Houston Dash	
14	(France)	Claire Lavogez	Kansas City Current	(United States)	Megan Rapinoe	OL Reign	
15	(United States)	Makenzy Doniak	San Diego Wave FC	(Japan)	Fuka Nagano	North Carolina Courage	
16	(United States)	Megan Rapinoe	OL Reign	(United States)	Mallory Pugh	Chicago Red Stars	
17	(United States)	Amber Brooks	Washington Spirit	(Brazil)	Kerolin	North Carolina Courage	
18	(Canada)	Kailen Sheridan	San Diego Wave FC	(United States)	Mallory Pugh	Chicago Red Stars	
19	(Brazil)	Debinha	North Carolina Courage	(United States)	Morgan Weaver	Portland Thorns FC	

=== 2023 ===
Week	Player of the Week			Runner-up			Reference
Week	Nat.	Player	Club	Nat.	Player	Club	Reference
1	(United States)	Lynn Williams	NJ/NY Gotham FC	(United States)	Sophia Smith	Portland Thorns FC	
2	(United States)	Sophia Smith	Portland Thorns FC	(Brazil)	Ary Borges	Racing Louisville FC	
3	(United States)	Phallon Tullis-Joyce	OL Reign	(United States)	Penelope Hocking	Chicago Red Stars	
4	(United States)	Lynn Williams (2)	NJ/NY Gotham FC	(United States)	Bethany Balcer	OL Reign	
5	(Brazil)	Debinha	Kansas City Current	(United States)	Phallon Tullis-Joyce	OL Reign	
6	(United States)	Crystal Dunn	Portland Thorns FC	(Japan)	Jun Endo	Angel City FC	
7	(United States)	Abby Smith	NJ/NY Gotham FC	(China)	Wang Shuang	Racing Louisville FC	
8	(United States)	Lynn Williams (3)	NJ/NY Gotham FC	(United States)	Savannah DeMelo	Racing Louisville FC	
9	(Brazil)	Bruninha	NJ/NY Gotham FC	(United States)	Alyssa Naeher	Chicago Red Stars	
10	(United States)	Sydney Leroux	Angel City FC	(United States)	Morgan Weaver	Portland Thorns FC	
11	(Brazil)	Kerolin	North Carolina Courage	(Brazil)	Adriana	Orlando Pride	
12	(United States)	Tara McKeown (Note: Tara Rudd, née Tara McKeown.)	Washington Spirit	(Brazil)	Kerolin	North Carolina Courage	
13	(United States)	Sophia Smith (2)	Portland Thorns FC	(United States)	Lynn Williams	NJ/NY Gotham FC	
14	(United States)	Julie Doyle	Orlando Pride	(United States)	Elyse Bennett	OL Reign	
15	(United States)	Messiah Bright	Orlando Pride	(United States)	Abby Smith	NJ/NY Gotham FC	
16	(United States)	Kristen Hamilton	Kansas City Current	(United States)	Brianna Pinto	North Carolina Courage	

=== 2025 ===
Week	Nat.	Player	Club	Ref.
1	(Zambia)	Barbra Banda	Orlando Pride	
2	(Germany)	Gia Corley	San Diego Wave FC	
3	(United States)	Ashley Hatch	Washington Spirit	
4	(United States)	Alyssa Thompson	Angel City FC	
5	(France)	Delphine Cascarino	San Diego Wave FC	
6	(Spain)	Esther González	NJ/NY Gotham FC	
7	(United States)	Riley Tiernan	Angel City FC	
8	(Brazil)	Debinha	Kansas City Current	
9	(Japan)	Manaka Matsukubo	North Carolina Courage	
10	(Canada)	Adriana Leon	San Diego Wave FC	
11	(United States)	Brittany Ratcliffe	Washington Spirit	
12	(Canada)	Jessie Fleming	Portland Thorns FC	
13	(United States)	Aubrey Kingsbury	Washington Spirit	
14	(United States)	Croix Bethune	Washington Spirit	
15	(United States)	Jordyn Bloomer	Racing Louisville FC	
16	(Canada)	Jordyn Huitema	Seattle Reign FC	
17	(Brazil)	Ludmila	Chicago Stars FC	
18	(United States)	Riley Tiernan (2)	Angel City FC	
19	(United States)	Trinity Rodman	Washington Spirit	
20	(United States)	Tara McKeown	Washington Spirit	
21	(Colombia)	Leicy Santos	Washington Spirit	
22	(Nigeria)	Gift Monday	Washington Spirit	
23	(Ivory Coast)	Rosemonde Kouassi	Washington Spirit	
24	(United States)	Kennedy Fuller	Angel City FC	
25	(Japan)	Manaka Matsukubo (2)	North Carolina Courage	
26	(Canada)	Jessie Fleming (2)	Portland Thorns FC	

=== 2026 ===
Week	Nat.	Player	Club	Ref.
1	(United States)	Ashley Sanchez	North Carolina Courage	
2	(Iceland)	Sveindís Jane Jónsdóttir	Angel City FC	
3	(United States)	Lia Godfrey	San Diego Wave FC	
4	(Jamaica)	Kiki Van Zanten	Houston Dash	
5	(Colombia)	Leicy Santos	Washington Spirit	
6	(United States)	Trinity Rodman	Washington Spirit	
7	(Malawi)	Temwa Chawinga	Kansas City Current	
8	(Canada)	Janine Sonis	Denver Summit FC	
9	(United States)	Sophia Wilson	Portland Thorns FC	
10	(Japan)	Manaka Matsukubo	North Carolina Courage	
11	(United States)	Trinity Rodman (2)	Washington Spirit	
12	(Spain)	Esther González	Gotham FC	
13	(United States)	Rose Lavelle	Gotham FC	
14	(United States)	Maja Lardner	Racing Louisville FC	
15	(Sweden)	Evelyn Ijeh	North Carolina Courage	
16	(United States)	Pietra Tordin	Portland Thorns FC	
17	(United States)	Caiya Hanks	Portland Thorns FC	
18	(United States)	Ashley Sanchez (2)	North Carolina Courage	
19	(United States)	Trinity Byars	San Diego Wave FC	
20	No award			
21	(United States)	Ashley Sanchez (3)	North Carolina Courage	
22	(United States)	Alyssa Naeher	Chicago Stars FC	
23	(United States)	Sophia Wilson (2)	Portland Thorns FC	

== Multiple winners ==
As of September 15, 2026 (includes Challenge Cup winners)

The below table lists players who have won on more than one occasion.

bold*	Indicates current NWSL player
italics	Indicates player still playing professional soccer

Rank	Nat.	Player	Team(s)	Wins
1	(Australia)	Sam Kerr*	Western New York Flash, NJ/NY Gotham FC, Chicago Stars FC (Note: Chicago Stars FC was previously known as Chicago Red Stars.)	13
2	(United States)	Crystal Dunn	Washington Spirit, North Carolina Courage, Portland Thorns FC	9
3	(United States)	Megan Rapinoe	Seattle Reign FC	8
3	(United States)	Lynn Biyendolo*	Western New York Flash, North Carolina Courage, NJ/NY Gotham FC	8
5	(Wales)	Jess Fishlock*	Seattle Reign FC	6
5	(United States)	Sofia Huerta*	Chicago Stars FC, Seattle Reign FC	6
5	(United States)	Sydney Leroux*	Boston Breakers, Seattle Reign FC, FC Kansas City, Orlando Pride, Angel City FC	6
8	(United States)	Mallory Swanson*	Washington Spirit, Chicago Stars FC	5
8	(United States)	Alyssa Naeher*	Boston Breakers, Chicago Stars FC	5
8	(United States)	Sophia Wilson*	Portland Thorns FC	5
11	(United States)	Adrianna Franch	Portland Thorns FC, Kansas City Current	4
11	(United States)	Kristen Hamilton	North Carolina Courage, Kansas City Current	4
11	(Japan)	Nahomi Kawasumi	Seattle Reign FC	4
11	(United States)	Aubrey Kingsbury*	Washington Spirit	4
11	(United States)	Alex Morgan	Portland Thorns FC, San Diego Wave FC	4
11	(United States)	Christen Press	Chicago Stars FC, Utah Royals FC, Angel City FC	4
17	(Spain)	Verónica Boquete	Portland Thorns FC	3
17	(England)	Rachel Daly	Houston Dash	3
17	(Brazil)	Debinha*	North Carolina Courage, Kansas City Current	3
17	(United States)	Lindsey Heaps*	Portland Thorns FC, Denver Summit FC	3
17	(France)	Eugénie Le Sommer	Seattle Reign FC	3
17	(Canada)	Karina LeBlanc	Portland Thorns FC, Chicago Stars FC	3
17	(Canada)	Adriana Leon*	Boston Breakers, San Diego Wave FC	3
17	(Scotland)	Kim Little	Seattle Reign FC	3
17	(Japan)	Manaka Matsukubo	North Carolina Courage	3
17	(United States)	Midge Purce*	Portland Thorns FC, NJ/NY Gotham FC	3
17	(United States)	Trinity Rodman*	Washington Spirit	3
17	(United States)	Ashley Sanchez*	North Carolina Courage	3
29	(United States)	Bethany Balcer	Seattle Reign FC	2
29	(United States)	Michelle Betos	Portland Thorns FC, Racing Louisville FC	2
29	(Spain)	Esther González	NJ/NY Gotham FC	2
29	(Canada)	Jessie Fleming*	Portland Thorns FC	2
29	(United States)	Shea Groom	FC Kansas City	2
29	(United States)	Ashley Hatch*	Washington Spirit	2
29	(United States)	Tobin Heath	Portland Thorns FC	2
29	(United States)	Carli Lloyd	Western New York Flash	2
29	(United States)	Jessica McDonald	Western New York Flash, North Carolina Courage	2
29	(Japan)	Yūki Nagasato	Chicago Stars FC	2
29	(Nigeria)	Ifeoma Onumonu	Seattle Reign FC, NJ/NY Gotham FC	2
29	(United States)	Tara Rudd*	Washington Spirit	2
29	(England)	Lianne Sanderson	Boston Breakers	2
29	(Canada)	Christine Sinclair	Portland Thorns FC	2
29	(England)	Jodie Taylor	Washington Spirit, Seattle Reign FC	2
29	(United States)	Riley Tiernan*	Angel City FC	2
29	(United States)	Abby Wambach	Western New York Flash	2
29	(United States)	Kealia Watt	Houston Dash	2
29	(United States)	McCall Zerboni	North Carolina Courage	2

== See also ==
- List of sports awards honoring women
- NWSL awards
- NWSL Team of the Month
- NWSL Rookie of the Month
- NWSL Player of the Month
- NWSL records and statistics
- Women's soccer in the United States
