= Andi Tostanoski =

American soccer goalkeeper (born 1994)

Personal information
- Full name: Andi Alise Tostanoski
- Date of birth: August 29, 1994 (age 32)
- Place of birth: Colorado Springs, Colorado, United States
- Height: 5 ft 9 in (1.75 m)
- Position: Goalkeeper

College career
Years	Team	Apps	(Gls)
2012–2015	Santa Clara Broncos		

Senior career*
Years	Team	Apps	(Gls)
2016	Seattle Reign FC	2	(0)

International career
2013	United States U20		
2016	United States U23		
- * Club domestic league appearances and goals as of July 23, 2016

Andi Alise Tostanoski (born August 29, 1994) is an American soccer goalkeeper who played for Seattle Reign FC of the National Women's Soccer League (NWSL) as a non-rostered amateur player. During her time at the Reign she earned multiple single game contracts and eventually a mid-season full contract.

== Early life ==
Born and raised in Colorado Springs, Colorado, Tostanoski attended Palmer High School where she played on the soccer team. She attended Santa Clara University from 2012 until 2016. In 2012, she was named to the West Coast Conference All-Freshman Team. In 2014, she was named West Coast Conference Goalkeeper of the Year and earned All Conference and All Academic team honors. In 2015, she was named Third Team West Coast Conference Goalkeeper, All West Coast Conference Honorable Mention, was a NSCAA Scholar First Team West Coast Conference, and made the West Coast Conference All Academic team.

Tostanoski left Santa Clara as one of the most decorated soccer players to ever play there. In four seasons, Tostanoski recorded 337 saves and a 0.047 Goals against average (GAA). She also had a 0.804 save percentage and played 7542.53 minutes in 84 games.

== Playing career ==
Tostanoski was invited to train with Seattle Reign FC prior to the 2016 season. She subsequently earned two one-match GK replacement contracts, before making her first appearance as for the club during a match against the Western New York Flash in July 2016. She has represented the United States at the under-18, under-20, and under-23 levels.

== Coaching ==
After Tostanoski ended her playing career at Seattle Reign FC, she started as a volunteer coach for the Colorado College Tigers's Women's team in 2016 which kicked off her coaching career. In 2017, she accepted a graduate assistant position at Hawaii Pacific University, and coached for two seasons before returning an assistant coach at Colorado College where she was for 3 years. After her stint at Colorado College she returned home to Pride Soccer Club, where she played her youth career, to be an assistant director of coaching. In addition to her work with the youth players at Pride SC, Andi has also served on the ODP West Region staff as an assistant goalkeeper coach from 2020 to 2022, after which she was named the Head of Goalkeeping for the Region in November 2022.
