= Summit League women's soccer tournament =

- Conference soccer championship
- Sport: College soccer
- Conference: Summit League
- Number of teams: 4 (1994-2021) 6 (2022-Present)
- Format: Single-elimination
- Current stadium: Campus Sites
- Played: 1994–present
- Last contest: 2026
- Current champion: Oral Roberts (3rd title)
- Most championships: South Dakota State (9 titles)
- TV partner: Summit League Network (Midco)
- Official website: thesummitleague.org/wsoc

The Summit League women's soccer tournament is the conference championship tournament in women's college soccer for the Summit League. The tournament has been held every year since 1999. It is a single-elimination tournament and seeding is based on regular season records.

The winner, declared conference champion, receives the conference's automatic bid to the NCAA Division I women's soccer tournament.

The program with the most tournament titles is South Dakota State with 9. Oral Roberts is the current champion (2026).

== Champions ==
Key

- (1) – Title number
- (a.e.t.) – Match went to extra time
- (p) – Match decided by a penalty shootout after extra time
- – Winning team also won regular season

=== Finals ===
Ed.	Year	Champion	Score	Runner-up	Venue	City	Tournament MVP
1	1999	Oral Roberts (1)	2–1 (a.e.t.)	Valparaiso	Carroll Stadium	Indianapolis, IN	Kari Shoemaker (ORU)
2	2000	Oakland (1)	2–1 (a.e.t.)	Oral Roberts		Tulsa, OK	Kristen Luoma (OAK)
3	2001	Oakland (2)	3–0	Oral Roberts		Tulsa, OK	Anita Rapp (OAK)
4	2002	Oakland (3)	1–1 (4–2 p)	Oral Roberts		Tulsa, OK	Sara Buckland (OAK)
5	2003	Oakland (4)	3–1	Oral Roberts		Tulsa, OK	Erica Demers (OAK)
6	2004	Oral Roberts (2)	3–1	Valparaiso		Rochester, MI	Gentry Detter (ORU)
7	2005	Valparaiso (1)	3–1	Oakland		Tulsa, OK	Emily King (VALPO)
8	2006	Oakland (5)	1–1 (4–3 p)	Western Illinois		Rochester, MI	Jessica Boyle (OAK)
9	2007	Oakland (6)	3–1	Western Illinois		Rochester, MI	Jessica Boyle (OAK)
10	2008	South Dakota State (1)	1–0	Oakland	John MacKenzie Field	Macomb, IL	Erin Kasmarik (SDSU)
11	2009	IUPUI (1)	4–1	South Dakota State	Fishback Soccer Park	Brookings, SD	Jamie Farrell (IUPUI)
12	2010	North Dakota State (1)	3–1	Western Illinois	Fishback Soccer Park	Brookings, SD	Marissa Wolfgram (NDSU)
13	2011	Oakland (7)	2–1	North Dakota State		Rochester, MI	Meghan Reynolds (OAK)
14	2012	Oakland (8)	2–0	Purdue Fort Wayne	Fishback Soccer Park	Brookings, SD	Julianna Boyle (OAK)
15	2013	Denver (1)	5–1	North Dakota State	Hefner Soccer Complex	Fort Wayne, IN	Kristen Hamilton (DEN)
16	2014	South Dakota State (2)	1–1 (5–4 p)	Denver	CIBER Field	Denver, CO	Tori Poole (SDSU)
17	2015	South Dakota State (3)	3–0	North Dakota State	Fishback Soccer Park	Brookings, SD	Diana Potterveld (SDSU)
18	2016	South Dakota State (4)	0–0 (3–2 p)	Oral Roberts	Dacotah Field	Fargo, ND	Maggie Smither (SDSU)
19	2017	Denver (2)	2–1	North Dakota State	Dacotah Field	Fargo, ND	Angelica Pacheco (DEN)
20	2018	Denver (3)	4–0	Omaha	Fishback Soccer Park	Brookings, SD	Hannah Adler (DEN)
21	2019	South Dakota State (5)	1–1 (4–2 p)	Denver	Fishback Soccer Park	Brookings, SD	Maggie Smither (SDSU)
22	2020^{1}	Denver (4)	3–0	Omaha	Caniglia Field	Omaha, NE	Kaitlyn Glover (DEN)
23	2021	South Dakota State (6)	4–2	Denver	CIBER Field	Denver, CO	Rachel Preston (SDSU)
24	2022	Omaha (1)	0–0 (3–1 p)	Oral Roberts	Caniglia Field	Omaha, NE	Emma Konsmo (OMAHA)
25	2023	South Dakota State (7)	1–0	Omaha	Fishback Soccer Park	Brookings, SD	Katherine Jones (SDSU)
26	2024	South Dakota State (8)	3–1	Oral Roberts	Dacotah Field	Fargo, ND	Kaycee Manding (SDSU)
27	2025	South Dakota State (9)	2–0	Oral Roberts	Case Soccer Complex	Tulsa, OK	Lauren Eckerle (SDSU)
28	2026	Oral Roberts (3)	1–0	North Dakota State	Case Soccer Complex	Tulsa, OK	Carys Torgesen (ORU)

Notes

- ^{1} – Played in Spring 2021

== Performance by school ==
As of November 15, 2026

School	W	L	T	Pct.	Finals	Titles	Title Years
Centenary	0	1	1	.250	0	0	—
Denver	10	3	6	.684	7	4	2013, 2017, 2018, 2020
IUPUI	2	5	0	.286	1	1	2009
Kansas City	1	3	0	.250	0	0	—
North Dakota	0	2	0	.000	0	0	—
North Dakota State	7	12	0	.368	6	1	2010
Oakland	15	4	3	.750	10	8	2000, 2001, 2002, 2003, 2006, 2007, 2011, 2012
Omaha	4	7	4	.400	4	1	2022
Oral Roberts	15	10	5	.583	11	3	1999, 2004, 2026
Purdue Fort Wayne	1	2	0	.333	1	0	—
South Dakota	1	6	2	.222	0	0	—
South Dakota State	17	7	6	.667	10	9	2008, 2014, 2015, 2016, 2019, 2021, 2023, 2024, 2025
Southern Utah	0	5	0	.000	0	0	—
St. Thomas	1	1	0	.500	0	0	—
Valparaiso	6	5	0	.545	1	1	2005
Western Illinois	2	7	2	.273	3	0	—

Italics indicate a school that is no longer a member of the Summit League.
