= 2020 Summit League women's soccer tournament =

- Classification: Division I
- Teams: 4
- Matches: 3
- Site: Caniglia Field; Omaha, NE
- Champions: Denver (4th title)
- Winning coach: Jeff Hooker (4th title)
- MVP: Kaitlyn Glover (Denver)

2020 Summit League women's soccer standings
	Conf.						Overall
Team	W		L		T	PCT	W		L		T	PCT
Denver ‍†‍‡‍^{y}	14	–	1	–	1	.906	17	–	3	–	1	.833
South Dakota State ‍‍‍	12	–	0	–	4	.875	12	–	0	–	5	.853
Omaha ‍‍‍	8	–	4	–	4	.625	8	–	5	–	5	.583
South Dakota ‍‍‍	9	–	6	–	1	.594	9	–	7	–	1	.559
North Dakota State ‍‍‍	7	–	8	–	1	.469	7	–	8	–	1	.469
North Dakota ‍‍‍	5	–	9	–	0	.357	5	–	9	–	0	.357
Kansas City ‍‍‍	4	–	11	–	1	.281	4	–	12	–	1	.265
Oral Roberts ‍‍‍	2	–	11	–	1	.179	2	–	12	–	1	.167
Western Illinois ‍‍‍	2	–	13	–	1	.156	2	–	13	–	1	.156
† – Conference champion ‡ – Summit League tournament champion y – Invited to the NCAA tournament As of May 26, 2023; Rankings from NSCAA

The 2020 Summit League women's soccer tournament was the postseason women's soccer tournament for the Summit League held on April 15 and 17, 2021. It was played in the spring of 2021 along with the conference season due to the COVID-19 pandemic. The three-match tournament took place at Caniglia Field in Omaha, Nebraska. The four-team single elimination tournament consisted of two rounds based on seeding from regular season conference play. South Dakota State was the defending champion, and were unable to defend their title, losing to Omaha in the semifinal game in penalties. Denver won the championship game over Omaha, which was their fourth since entering the conference and also for coach Jeff Hooker. Denver has now won or participated in the championship game in the last four tournaments.

== Seeding and Standings ==
The top four of the nine teams competing during the regular season qualified for the 2020 tournament. Seeding was based on regular season conference records. No tiebreakers were required as the top four teams each finished with unique conference records.

Seed	School	Conference Record	Points
1	Denver	14–1–1	43
2	South Dakota State	12–0–4	40
3	Omaha	8–4–4	28
4	South Dakota	9–6–1	28
5	North Dakota State	7–8–1	22
6	North Dakota	5–9–0	15
7	Kansas City	4–11–1	13
8	Oral Roberts	2–11–1	7
9	Western Illinois	2–13–1	7

- North Dakota State, North Dakota, Kansas City, Oral Roberts, and Western Illinois did not participate in the tournament.

== Bracket ==
Semifinals; Thursday, April 15
1	Denver	2
4	South Dakota	0
2	South Dakota State	0 (1)
3	Omaha (pen.)	0 (3)

Finals; Friday, April 17
1	Denver	3
3	Omaha	0

== Schedule ==
=== Semifinals ===
April 15, 2021	#1 Denver	2–0	#4 South Dakota	Omaha, NE
2:00 PM CT	Kaitlyn Glover 12'; Sydney Sharp 25'	Report		Stadium: Caniglia Field; Attendance: 134; Referee: Matt Seam; Assistant referees: Brittney Hageman; Nathan Jones; Fourth official: Adriane Dougerty

April 15, 2022	#2 South Dakota State	0–0 (a.e.t.) (1–3 p)	#3 Omaha	Omaha, NE
5:00 PM CT		Report		Stadium: Caniglia Field; Attendance: 390; Referee: Velimir Stefanonovic; Assistant referees: Adam Hotz; Brittny Seem; Fourth official: Michael Barton
	Penalties
	Gabby Vivier-Hannay (penalty missed); Eden Brooker (penalty scored); Rachel Preston (penalty missed); Maya Hansen (penalty missed)		Grace Ostergaard (penalty scored); Sophia Green (penalty scored); Andrea Daves (penalty missed); Emilie Erland (penalty scored)

=== Final ===
April 17, 2021	#3 Omaha	0–3	#1 Denver	Omaha, NE
3:00 PM CT		Report	Kaitlyn Glover 4'; Sami Feller 40'; Sydney Sharp 54'	Stadium: Caniglia Field; Attendance: 530; Referee: Art Arustayan; Assistant referees: Adriane Dougherty; Elijiah Dacy; Fourth official: Matt Seam

== Statistics ==
=== Goalscorers ===
There were 5 goals scored in 3 matches, for an average of 1 goal per match. 2 goals

- Kaitlyn Glover
- Sydney Sharp

1 goal

- Sami Feller

== All-Tournament team ==
Player	Team
**Kaitlyn Glover**	Denver
Natalie Beckman	Denver
Nerea Arrazola	Denver
Sydney Sharp	Denver
Sami Feller	Denver
Grace Ostergaard	Omaha
Emilie Erland	Omaha
Grace Thede	Omaha
Rachel Hewitt	South Dakota State
Adelaide Kline	South Dakota State
Teresa Fontenot	South Dakota
Abby Ostrem	South Dakota

MVP in bold
