= 2025 Summit League women's soccer tournament =

2025 Summit League Women's soccer tournament
- Classification: Division I
- Teams: 6
- Matches: 5
- Site: Campus Sites
- Champions: South Dakota State (9th title)
- Winning coach: Brock Thompson (5th title)
- MVP: Lauren Eckerle (SDSU)
- Broadcast: Summit League Network
Summit League Women's soccer tournament
«2024	2026»

2025 Summit League women's soccer standings
	Conf.						Overall
Team	W		L		T	PCT	W		L		T	PCT
Oral Roberts ‍†‍‍	6	–	1	–	1	.813	13	–	5	–	2	.700
Denver ‍†‍‍	6	–	1	–	1	.813	9	–	5	–	4	.611
South Dakota State ‍‍‡‍^{y}	4	–	1	–	3	.688	13	–	3	–	6	.727
Kansas City ‍‍‍	3	–	3	–	2	.500	9	–	8	–	3	.525
South Dakota ‍‍‍	3	–	3	–	2	.500	7	–	6	–	6	.526
Omaha ‍‍‍	3	–	4	–	1	.438	6	–	9	–	4	.421
North Dakota ‍‍‍	2	–	4	–	2	.375	8	–	7	–	3	.528
North Dakota State ‍‍‍	1	–	6	–	1	.188	5	–	12	–	1	.306
St. Thomas ‍‍‍	0	–	5	–	3	.188	3	–	9	–	4	.313
† – Conference champion ‡ – Summit League tournament champion y – Invited to the NCAA tournament As of December 9, 2025; Rankings from United Soccer Coaches Poll; Source: Summit League

The 2025 Summit League women's soccer tournament was the postseason women's soccer tournament for the Summit League for the 2025 season and was held on November 1, 2, 6, and 9, 2025. The five-match tournament took place at various campus sites. The six-team single elimination tournament consisted of three rounds based on seeding from regular season conference play. The South Dakota State Jackrabbits successfully defended their title to win their third championship in a row and secured the Summit League's automatic bid to the 2025 NCAA Division I women's soccer tournament.

== Seeding ==
The top six of the nine teams competing during the regular season qualified for the 2025 tournament. Seeding was based on regular-season conference records. A tiebreaker was required to determine the first and second seeds in the tournament as Denver and Oral Roberts both finished with 6–1–1 conference records. Oral Roberts earned the top seed by virtue of their 1–0 regular season defeat of Denver on October 5 in Denver. Therefore, Denver was the second seed. Another tiebreaker determined the fourth and fifth seeds between Kansas City and South Dakota as both teams finished with 3–3–2 regular season records. The two teams tied 1–1 on October 9 during the regular season. The next tiebreaker was a goal difference in league matches. Kansas City finished with a -1 goal difference, while South Dakota achieved a +2 goal difference. Therefore, South Dakota earned the fourth seed, as well as the right to host the first round match between the teams.

Seed	School	Conference Record	Points
1	Oral Roberts	6–1–1	19
2	Denver	6–1–1	19
3	South Dakota State	4–1–3	15
4	South Dakota	3–3–2	11
5	Kansas City	3–3–2	11
6	Omaha	3–4–1	10

== Bracket ==
Quarterfinals; Saturday, November 1 Sunday, November 2
4	South Dakota	0
5	Kansas City	1
3	South Dakota State	1
6	Omaha	0

Semifinals; Thursday, November 6
1	Oral Roberts	2
5	Kansas City	1
2	Denver	0
3	South Dakota State	1

Final; Sunday, November 9
1	Oral Roberts	0
3	South Dakota State	2

== Schedule ==
The 2025 schedule included the quarterfinals played on November 1 and 2, the semifinals on November 7, and the final match on November 10. In the quarterfinals, the higher-seeded teams hosted each of the two matchups; subsequently, both the semifinals and the championship game were hosted by the top seed.

=== Quarterfinals ===
November 1, 2025	#3 South Dakota State	1–0	#6 Omaha	Brookings, SD
5:00 p.m. CT	Jenna Maloy 6'	Report		Stadium: Fishback Soccer Park; Attendance: 272; Referee: Ryan Farrell; Assistant referees: Matthew Von Pinnon; Tyler Spiczka; Fourth official: Joe Masek

November 2, 2025	#4 South Dakota	0–1	#5 Kansas City	Vermillion, SD
1:00 p.m. CT	Brooklyn Bordson (yellow card) 61'; Team (yellow card) 62'; Ashby Johnston (yellow card) 83'		Olivia Platt 15'; Kaitlyn Edwards (yellow card) 47'; Maryam El-Demerdash (yellow card) 71'	Stadium: First Bank & Trust Soccer Complex; Attendance: 388; Referee: Zachary Richter; Assistant referees: Adam Maska; Tyler Grilley; Fourth official: Nicole Bissell

=== Semifinals ===
November 6, 2025	#2 Denver	0–1	#3 South Dakota State	Tulsa, OK
1:00 p.m. CT	Team (yellow card) 71'; Team (yellow card) 88'	Report	Lauren Walter 71'	Stadium: Case Soccer Complex; Attendance: 159; Referee: Corina Willner; Assistant referees: Eric Aplis; Albert Franklin; Fourth official: Daniel Banjo

November 6, 2025	#1 Oral Roberts	2–1	#5 Kansas City	Tulsa, OK
7:30 p.m. CT	Genesis Helsley 49'; Marlee Fort 50'; Marlee Fort (yellow card) 80'; Team (yellow card) 87'; Julia Thasaphong (yellow card) 87'	Report	Olivia Platt 17'; Delfina Zolesio Fernandez Blanco (yellow card) 63'	Stadium: Case Soccer Complex; Attendance: 643; Referee: Anthony Sobolevsky; Assistant referees: Brendan Sweetman; Jay Norris; Fourth official: Daniel Banjo

=== Final ===
November 9, 2025	#1 Oral Roberts	0–2	#3 South Dakota State	Tulsa, OK
1:00 p.m. CT	Alani Chaple (yellow card) 53'; Kylee Munson (yellow card) 56'; Marlee Fort (yellow card) 84'	Report	Ellie Gusman 8'; Adrianne Agbayani 72'; Alohi Ramos (yellow card) 72'; Mia Bosch (yellow card) 86'	Stadium: Case Soccer Complex; Attendance: 597; Referee: Tim Wagner; Assistant referees: Chris Thresher; Yophiyyah Fish; Fourth official: Will Franklin

== Statistics ==
=== Goalscorers ===
There were 7 goals scored in 5 matches, for an average of 1.4 goals per match (as of November 9, 2025).

2 goals

- Olivia Platt – Kansas City

1 goal

- Genesis Helsley – Oral Roberts
- Marlee Fort – Oral Roberts
- Adrianne Agbayani – South Dakota State
- Ellie Gusman – South Dakota State
- Jenna Maloy – South Dakota State
- Lauren Waller – South Dakota State

== All–Tournament Team ==
Player	Team
Lauren Eckerle (MVP)	South Dakota State
Mallorie Benhart	South Dakota State
Ellie Gusman	South Dakota State
Lauren Walter	South Dakota State
Marlee Fort	Oral Roberts
Genesis Helsley	Oral Roberts
Haley Nichols	Oral Roberts
Anika Patton	Kansas City
Olivia Platt	Kansas City
Hannah Tate	Denver
Emma Thielbahr	Denver
Addie LaRock	Omaha
Sam Luft	South Dakota
