= 2021 Summit League women's soccer tournament =

- Classification: Division I
- Teams: 4
- Matches: 3
- Attendance: 793
- Site: UD Soccer Stadium; Denver, Colorado
- Champions: South Dakota State (6th title)
- Winning coach: Brock Thompson (2nd title)
- MVP: Rachel Preston (South Dakota State)
- Broadcast: Online (TheSummitLeague.org)

2021 Summit League women's soccer standings
	Conf.						Overall
Team	W		L		T	PCT	W		L		T	PCT
Denver ‍†‍‍	8	–	0	–	1	.944	13	–	6	–	2	.667
South Dakota State ‍‍‡‍^{y}	6	–	2	–	1	.722	17	–	4	–	1	.795
Omaha ‍‍‍	6	–	3	–	0	.667	9	–	8	–	2	.526
South Dakota ‍‍‍	5	–	3	–	1	.611	10	–	4	–	4	.667
Western Illinois ‍‍‍	5	–	4	–	0	.556	11	–	6	–	1	.639
Kansas City ‍‍‍	4	–	5	–	0	.444	6	–	13	–	0	.316
Oral Roberts ‍‍‍	3	–	5	–	1	.389	6	–	10	–	2	.389
North Dakota State ‍‍‍	3	–	6	–	0	.333	3	–	12	–	1	.219
St. Thomas ‍‍‍	2	–	7	–	0	.222	4	–	12	–	1	.265
North Dakota ‍‍‍	1	–	8	–	0	.111	3	–	13	–	1	.206
† – Conference champion ‡ – 2021 Summit League Tournament champion y – Invited to the NCAA tournament As of December 7, 2021; Rankings from United Soccer Coaches Poll; Source:Summit League

The 2021 Summit League women's soccer tournament was the postseason women's soccer tournament for the Summit League held on November 4 and 6, 2021. The three-match tournament took place at University of Denver Soccer Stadium in Denver, Colorado. The four-team single-elimination tournament consisted of two rounds based on seeding from regular season conference play. The Denver Pioneers were the defending champions, and were unable to defend their title losing to South Dakota State in the final. The tournament win was South Dakota State's sixth as a member of the conference, and the second for coach Brock Thompson. South Dakota State has now won two of the past three Summit League tournaments. As tournament champions, South Dakota State earned the Summit League's automatic berth into the 2021 NCAA Division I Women's Soccer Tournament.

== Seeding ==
The top four of the ten teams competing during the regular season qualified for the 2021 Tournament. Seeding was based on regular season conference records. No tiebreakers were required as the top four teams each finished with unique conference records.

Seed	School	Conference Record	Points
1	Denver	8–0–1	24
2	South Dakota State	6–2–1	19
3	Omaha	6–3–0	18
4	South Dakota	5–3–1	16

== Bracket ==
Semifinals; Thursday, November 4
1	Denver (pen.)	1 (4)
4	South Dakota	1 (2)
2	South Dakota State (a.e.t.)	1
3	Omaha	0

Final; Saturday, November 6
1	Denver	2
2	South Dakota State	4

== Schedule ==
=== Semifinals ===
November 4, 2021	#1 Denver	1–1 (a.e.t.) (4–2 p)	#4 South Dakota	Denver, CO
1:00 p.m. MT	Sydney Sharp 54'	Report	81' Jordan Centineo	Stadium: UD Soccer Stadium; Attendance: 210; Referee: Dimitrios Katsimingos; Assistant referees: Vince Kofa; Jason Hampton; Fourth official: Federico Ruiz
	Penalties
	Natalie Beckman (penalty scored); Ella Frost (penalty scored); Kaitlyn Glover (penalty scored); Vanessa Murray (penalty missed); Hannah Gallegos (penalty scored)		(penalty scored) Lindsay Farrell; (penalty missed) Alexis Mitchell; (penalty scored) Joana Zanin; (penalty missed) Abby Ostrem

November 4, 2021	#2 South Dakota State	1–0 (a.e.t.)	#3 Omaha	Denver, CO
4:00 p.m. MT	Kayal Anderson 107'	Report		Stadium: UD Soccer Stadium; Attendance: 277; Referee: Marcelo Soto; Assistant referees: Sanitago Ramirez; Doug Devine; Fourth official: Federico Ruiz

=== Final ===
November 6, 2021	#1 Denver	2–4	#2 South Dakota State	Denver, CO
2:00 p.m. MT	Sydney Sharp 1', (yellow card) 87'; Devan McSwain 86'	Report	24' Maya Hansen; 34' Laney Murdzek; 54' Rachel Preston; (yellow card) 68' Avery Murdzek; 85' Cecilia Limongi	Stadium: UD Soccer Stadium; Attendance: 306; Referee: Dimitar Chavdarov; Assistant referees: Sara Renyer; Adam Rice; Fourth official: Federico Ruiz

== Statistics ==
=== Goalscorers ===
There were 9 goals scored in 3 matches, for an average of 3 goals per match (as of November 7, 2021).

2 goals

- Sydney Sharp – Denver

1 goal

- Devan McSwain – Denver
- Jordan Centineo – South Dakota
- Kayal Anderson – South Dakota State
- Maya Hansen – South Dakota State
- Cecilia Limongi – South Dakota State
- Laney Murdzek – South Dakota State
- Rachel Preston – South Dakota State

== All-Tournament team ==
Player	Team
**Rachel Preston**	South Dakota State
Katherine Jones	South Dakota State
Karlee Manding	South Dakota State
Katie Zabel	South Dakota State
Sydney Sharp	Denver
Devan McSwain	Denver
Brittney Lewis	Denver
Grace Ostergaard	Omaha
Jordyn West	Omaha
Maddison Sullivan	South Dakota
Joana Zanin	South Dakota

MVP in bold
