= 2019 Summit League women's soccer tournament =

- Classification: Division I
- Teams: 4
- Matches: 3
- Attendance: 380
- Site: Fishback Soccer Park; Brookings, South Dakota
- Champions: South Dakota State (5th title)
- Winning coach: Brock Thompson (1st title)
- MVP: Maggie Smither (South Dakota State)
- Broadcast: Online (TheSummitLeague.org)

2019 Summit League women's soccer standings
	Conf.						Overall
Team	W		L		T	PCT	W		L		T	PCT
Denver ‍†‍‍	7	–	0	–	1	.938	12	–	4	–	4	.700
South Dakota St ‍‍‡‍^{y}	6	–	1	–	1	.813	15	–	5	–	2	.727
Oral Roberts ‍‍‍	3	–	2	–	3	.563	6	–	9	–	4	.421
North Dakota ‍‍‍	4	–	4	–	0	.500	10	–	8	–	1	.553
North Dakota St ‍‍‍	3	–	3	–	2	.500	8	–	7	–	3	.528
South Dakota ‍‍‍	3	–	3	–	2	.500	8	–	9	–	2	.474
Omaha ‍‍‍	2	–	5	–	1	.313	5	–	11	–	2	.333
Western Illinois ‍‍‍	2	–	6	–	0	.250	6	–	11	–	1	.361
Purdue Fort Wayne ‍‍‍	0	–	6	–	2	.125	4	–	10	–	4	.333
† – Conference champion ‡ – 2019 Summit League Tournament champion y – Invited to the NCAA tournament As of December 9, 2019; Rankings from United Soccer Coaches Poll; Source:Summit League

The 2019 Summit League women's soccer tournament was the postseason women's soccer tournament for the Summit League held on November 7 and 9, 2019. The three-match tournament took place at Fishback Soccer Park in Brookings, South Dakota. The four-team single-elimination tournament consisted of two rounds based on seeding from regular season conference play. The Denver Pioneers were the defending champions, and were unable to defend their title losing to South Dakota State on penalties in the final. The win earned South Dakota State the conference's automatic bid to the NCAA tournament. The tournament win was Denver's fifth as a member of the conference, and the first for coach Brock Thompson.

== Bracket ==
Semifinals; Thursday, November 7
1	Denver	3
4	North Dakota	0
2	South Dakota State	1
3	Oral Roberts	0

Final; Saturday, November 9
1	Denver	1 (2)
2	South Dakota State	1 (4)

== Schedule ==
=== Semifinals ===
November 7, 2019	#1 Denver	3–0	#4 North Dakota	Brookings, South Dakota
3:00 p.m.	Sami Feller 47', 69'; North Dakota Own Goal 85' (o.g.)	Report	(yellow card) 71' Team	Stadium: Fishback Soccer Park; Attendance: 145; Referee: Shane Butler; Assistant referees: Artem Sher; Matthew Tiano; Fourth official: Sean Mallett

November 7, 2019	#2 South Dakota State	1–0	#3 Oral Roberts	Brookings, South Dakota
6:00 p.m.	Cecilia Limongi 69'	Report		Stadium: Fishback Soccer Park; Attendance: 235; Referee: Dimitar Chavdarov; Assistant referees: Tyler Dalsin; Okey Abara

=== Final ===
November 9, 2019	#1 Denver	1–1 (a.e.t.) (2–4 p)	#2 South Dakota State	Brookings, South Dakota
12:00 p.m.	Hannah Adler 35', (yellow card) 58'; Sami Feller (yellow card) 62'	Report	57' Leah Manuleleua; (yellow card) 67' Gabby Vivier-Hannay	Stadium: Fishback Soccer Park; Referee: Christopher Ruska; Assistant referees: Jeremy Kieso; Matt Von Pinnon
	Penalties
	Natalie Beckman (penalty scored); Maya Roston (penalty missed); Kaitlyn Glover (penalty scored); Hannah Adler (penalty missed)		(penalty scored) Maggie Smither; (penalty scored) Gabby Vivier-Hannay; (penalty missed) Karlee Manding; (penalty scored) Leah Manulelua; (penalty scored) Eden Brooker

== Statistics ==
=== Goalscorers ===
2 Goals

- Sami Feller (Denver)

1 Goal

- Hannah Adler (Denver)
- Cecilia Limongi (South Dakota State)
- Leah Manuleleua (South Dakota State)

Own Goals

- North Dakota vs. Denver

== All-Tournament team ==
Player	Team
Brooklyn Eardley	Oral Roberts
Anna Gornell	Oral Roberts
Karleen Yapello	North Dakota
Olivia Knox	North Dakota
Sami Feller	Denver
Cheyenne Shorts	Denver
Brittney Lewis	Denver
Carina McLennan	South Dakota State
**Maggie Smither**	South Dakota State
Shayna Stubbs	South Dakota State
Darien Poelstra	South Dakota State

MVP in bold

== See also ==
- Summit League
- 2019 NCAA Division I women's soccer season
- 2019 NCAA Division I Women's Soccer Tournament
- 2019 Summit League Men's Soccer Tournament
