= 2018 Summit League women's soccer tournament =

- Classification: Division I
- Teams: 4
- Matches: 3
- Attendance: 502
- Site: Fishback Soccer Park; Brookings, South Dakota
- Champions: Denver (3rd title)
- Winning coach: Jeff Hooker (3rd title)
- MVP: Hannah Adler (Denver)
- Broadcast: Online (TheSummitLeague.org)

2018 Summit League women's soccer standings
	Conf.						Overall
Team	W		L		T	PCT	W		L		T	PCT
Denver ‍†‍‡‍^{y}	7	–	1	–	0	.875	13	–	6	–	2	.667
South Dakota St ‍†‍‍	7	–	1	–	0	.875	12	–	6	–	1	.658
North Dakota St ‍‍‍	6	–	2	–	0	.750	9	–	7	–	0	.563
Omaha ‍‍‍	4	–	3	–	1	.563	8	–	11	–	2	.429
South Dakota ‍‍‍	4	–	4	–	0	.500	9	–	7	–	2	.556
North Dakota ‍‍‍	3	–	4	–	1	.438	9	–	6	–	2	.588
Oral Roberts ‍‍‍	3	–	5	–	0	.375	8	–	12	–	0	.400
Purdue Fort Wayne ‍‍‍	1	–	7	–	0	.125	4	–	12	–	3	.289
Western Illinois ‍‍‍	0	–	8	–	0	.000	3	–	14	–	1	.194
† – Conference champion ‡ – 2018 Summit League Tournament champion y – Invited to the NCAA tournament As of November 14, 2018; Rankings from United Soccer Coaches Poll; Source:Summit League

The 2018 Summit League women's soccer tournament was the postseason women's soccer tournament for the Summit League held on November 1 and 3, 2018. The three-match tournament took place at Fishback Soccer Park in Brookings, South Dakota. The four-team single-elimination tournament consisted of two rounds based on seeding from regular season conference play. The Denver Pioneers were the defending champions, and successfully defended their title with a 4–0 victory over the Omaha Mavericks in the final. The win earned Denver the conference's automatic bid to the NCAA tournament. The tournament win was Denver's third as a member of the conference, all of which have come under coach Jeff Hooker.

== Bracket ==
Semifinals; Thursday, November 1
1	South Dakota St	1
4	Omaha	3
2	Denver	3
3	North Dakota St	0

Final; Saturday, November 3
4	Omaha	0
2	Denver	4

== Schedule ==
=== Semifinals ===
November 1, 2018	#1 South Dakota St	1–3	#4 Omaha	Brookings, South Dakota
3:00 p.m.	Carina McLennan 50'	Report	Bailey Cascio 10', 30', 89'	Stadium: Fishback Soccer Park; Attendance: 316; Referee: Art Arustamyan; Assistant referees: Sean Mallett; Joe Masek

November 1, 2018	#2 Denver	3–0	#3 North Dakota St	Brookings, South Dakota
6:00 p.m.	Natalie Beckman 18'; Samantha Feller 46'; Camryn MacMillan 76'	Report		Stadium: Fishback Soccer Park; Attendance: 316

=== Final ===
November 3, 2018	#2 Denver	4–0	#4 Omaha	Brookings, South Dakota
12:00 p.m.	Hannah Adler 40'; Camryn MacMillan 51', 58'; Omaha Own Goal 74'	Report		Stadium: Fishback Soccer Park; Attendance: 186; Referee: Dimitar Chavdarov; Assistant referees: Jeremy Kieso; Kevin Mesman; Fourth official: Brad Peschong

== Statistics ==
=== Goalscorers ===
3 Goals

- Bailey Cascio – Omaha
- Camryn MacMillan – Denver

1 Goal

- Hannah Adler – Denver
- Carina McLennan – South Dakota St.

Own Goals

- Omaha vs. Denver

== All-Tournament team ==
Player	Team
Hannah Adler	Denver (MVP)
Samantha Feller	Denver
Camryn MacMillan	Denver
Cheyenne Shorts	Denver
Bailey Cascio	Omaha
Taylor Gelling	Omaha
Emily Romero	Omaha
Holly Enderle	North Dakota State
Mallory Fenske	North Dakota State
Darien Poelstra	South Dakota State
Kelsi Wipf	South Dakota State

== See also ==
- Summit League
- 2018 NCAA Division I women's soccer season
- 2018 NCAA Division I Women's Soccer Tournament
- 2018 Summit League Men's Soccer Tournament
