= 2014 Summit League women's soccer tournament =

Postseason women's soccer tournament

- Classification: Division I
- Teams: 4
- Matches: 3
- Site: CIBER Field; Denver, CO
- Champions: South Dakota State (2nd title)
- Winning coach: Lang Wedemeyer (2nd title)
- MVP: Tori Poole (South Dakota State)

2014 Summit League women's soccer standings
	Conf.						Overall
Team	W		L		T	PCT	W		L		T	PCT
South Dakota State ‍†‍‡‍^{y}	5	–	2	–	1	.688	10	–	8	–	2	.550
IUPUI ‍‍‍	5	–	3	–	0	.625	7	–	10	–	3	.425
Denver ‍‍‍	5	–	3	–	0	.625	10	–	8	–	2	.550
North Dakota State ‍‍‍	4	–	2	–	2	.625	8	–	8	–	2	.500
Western Illinois ‍‍‍	4	–	3	–	1	.563	5	–	12	–	1	.306
Omaha* ‍‍‍	3	–	3	–	2	.500	5	–	12	–	2	.316
Oral Roberts ‍‍‍	3	–	5	–	0	.375	4	–	10	–	3	.324
South Dakota ‍‍‍	2	–	4	–	2	.375	9	–	8	–	2	.526
Fort Wayne ‍‍‍	0	–	6	–	2	.125	2	–	14	–	2	.167
† – Conference champion ‡ – Summit League tournament champion y – Invited to the NCAA tournament * Ineligible for the 2014 NCAA tournament due to transition from Division II; As of May 26, 2023; Rankings from NSCAA

The 2014 Summit League women's soccer tournament was the postseason women's soccer tournament for the Summit League held on November 6 and 8, 2014. The three-match tournament took place at CIBER Field at the University of Denver Soccer Stadium in Denver, Colorado. The four-team single-elimination tournament consisted of two rounds based on seeding from regular season conference play. The Denver Pioneers were the defending champions, but were unable to defend their title after they lost the final match to the champion: South Dakota State. The tournament win was South Dakota State's second as a member of the conference, and second for coach Lang Wedemeyer. As tournament champions, South Dakota State earned the Summit League's automatic berth into the 2014 NCAA Division I Women's Soccer Tournament.

== Seeding ==
The top four of the ten teams competing during the regular season qualified for the 2014 tournament. Seeding was based on regular season conference records. IUPUI earned the second seed over Denver, based on IUPUI having the head-to-head tiebreaker over the Pioneers.

Seed	School	Conference Record	Points
1	South Dakota State	5-2-1	16
2	IUPUI	5-3-0	15
3	Denver	5-3-0	15
4	North Dakota State	4-2-2	14

== Bracket ==
Semifinals; Thursday, November 6
1	South Dakota State	2
4	North Dakota State	1
2	IUPUI	0
3	Denver	1

Final; Saturday, November 8
1	South Dakota State (PK's)	1 (5)
3	Denver	1 (4)

== Schedule ==
=== Semifinals ===
November 6, 2014	#1 South Dakota State	2-1	#4 North Dakota State	Denver, CO
3:00 p.m. MT	Tori Poole 1'; Tori Poole 58'	Report	Anisha Kinnarath 80'	Stadium: CIBER Field at the University of Denver Soccer Stadium; Attendance: 316; Referee: Chris Levesque; Assistant referees: Kira Chaffee; William Knause; Fourth official: Karen Abt

November 6, 2014	#2 IUPUI	0-1	#3 Denver	Denver, CO
6:00 p.m. MT		Report	Brooke Boothe 58'	Stadium: CIBER Field at the University of Denver Soccer Stadium; Attendance: 316; Referee: Ben Chouaf; Assistant referees: Matt Grove; Chris Greer; Fourth official: Kira Chaffee

=== Final ===
November 8, 2014	#1 South Dakota State	1-1 (a.e.t.) (5-4 p)	#3 Denver	Denver, CO
1:00 p.m. MT	Nicole Hatcher 89'	Report	Brooke Boothe 22'	Stadium: CIBER Field at the University of Denver Soccer Stadium; Attendance: 314; Referee: Khalaf Al-Latayfeh; Assistant referees: Karen Abt; Kira Chaffee; Fourth official: Chris Greer
	Penalties
	Madison Yueill (penalty scored); Diana Potterveld (penalty scored); Alyssa Brazil (penalty missed); Shelby Raper (penalty scored); Nicole Hatcher (penalty scored); Tori Poole (penalty scored)		Jocelyn Loomis (penalty missed); Shannen Johnson (penalty scored); Stella Norman (penalty scored); Lauren Conley (penalty scored); Francesca Garzelloni (penalty scored); Sam Harder (penalty missed)

== All-Tournament Team ==
Player	Team
**Tori Poole**	South Dakota State
Diana Potterveld	South Dakota State
Nicole Inskeep	South Dakota State
Nicole Hatcher	South Dakota State
Brooke Boothe	Denver
Francesca Garzelloni	Denver
Tina Vargas	Denver
Anna Rode	IUPUI
Kalli Shepler-Tucker	IUPUI
Anisha Kinnarath	North Dakota State
Tristyn Walczak	North Dakota State

MVP in bold
