= 2015 Summit League women's soccer tournament =

Postseason women's soccer tournament

- Classification: Division I
- Teams: 4
- Matches: 3
- Attendance: 985
- Site: Fishback Soccer Park; Brookings, South Dakota
- Champions: South Dakota State (3rd title)
- Winning coach: Lang Wedemeyer (3rd title)
- MVP: Diana Potterveld (South Dakota State)

2015 Summit League women's soccer standings
	Conf.						Overall
Team	W		L		T	PCT	W		L		T	PCT
North Dakota State ‍†‍‍	7	–	0	–	1	.938	13	–	6	–	1	.675
Oral Roberts ‍‍‍	6	–	2	–	1	.722	10	–	8	–	2	.550
South Dakota State ‍‍‡‍^{y}	5	–	1	–	2	.750	12	–	6	–	3	.643
South Dakota ‍‍‍	5	–	3	–	0	.625	8	–	12	–	0	.400
Denver ‍‍‍	4	–	4	–	0	.500	4	–	12	–	1	.265
Fort Wayne ‍‍‍	2	–	5	–	1	.313	4	–	13	–	2	.263
Omaha ‍‍‍	2	–	6	–	0	.250	5	–	11	–	2	.333
IUPUI ‍‍‍	1	–	5	–	2	.250	6	–	9	–	3	.417
Western Illinois ‍‍‍	1	–	7	–	0	.125	2	–	15	–	0	.118
† – Conference champion ‡ – Summit League tournament champion y – Invited to the NCAA tournament As of May 26, 2023; Rankings from NSCAA

The 2015 Summit League women's soccer tournament was the postseason women's soccer tournament for the Summit League held on November 5 and 7, 2015. The three-match tournament took place at Fishback Soccer Park in Brookings, South Dakota. The four-team single-elimination tournament consisted of two rounds based on seeding from regular season conference play. The South Dakota State Jackrabbits were the defending champions, and were successful in defending their championship. They defeated North Dakota State in the final. The win was South Dakota State's third as a member of the conference, and third for coach Lang Wedemeyer. This was South Dakota State's second consecutive championship.

== Seeding ==
The top four of the ten teams competing during the regular season qualified for the 2015 tournament. Seeding was based on regular season conference records. No tiebreakers were needed.

Seed	School	Conference Record	Points
1	North Dakota State	7-0-1	22
2	Oral Roberts	6-2-0	18
3	South Dakota State	5-1-2	17
4	South Dakota	5-3-0	15

== Bracket ==
Semifinals; Thursday, November 5
1	North Dakota State	4
4	South Dakota	3
2	Oral Roberts	1
3	South Dakota State	3

Final; Saturday, November 7
1	North Dakota State	0
3	South Dakota State	3

== Schedule ==
=== Semifinals ===
November 5, 2015	#2 Oral Roberts	1-3	#3 South Dakota State	Brookings, SD
3:00 p.m. CT	Caitlyn Hanslovan 84'	Report	Delaney Ratcliffe 41'; Brittany Jensen 51'; Brittany Jensen 54'	Stadium: Fishback Soccer Park; Attendance: 237; Referee: Art Arustamyan; Assistant referees: Tyler Soyer; Okey Abara; Fourth official: Christopher Koloffon

November 5, 2015	#1 North Dakota State	4-3 (a.e.t.)	#4 South Dakota	Brookings, SD
6:00 p.m. CT	Lauren Miller 8'; Amy Yang 72'; Lauren Miller 88'; Britney Monteon 100'	Report	Taylor Nivala 19'; Danielle Anderson (yellow card) 37'; Corey Strang 68'; Corey Strang 86'	Stadium: Fishback Soccer Park; Attendance: 322; Referee: Christopher Koloffon; Assistant referees: Art Arustamyan; Lauren Parliament; Fourth official: Kevin Mesman

=== Final ===
November 7, 2015	#1 North Dakota State	0-3	#3 South Dakota State	Brookings, SD
12:00 p.m. CT	Team (yellow card) 43'; Team (red card) 43'		Dani Patterson 16'; Diana Potterveld 43'; Diana Potterveld 69'	Stadium: Fishback Soccer Park; Attendance: 426; Referee: Landis Wiley; Assistant referees: Chris Koloffon; Art Arustamyan; Fourth official: Kevin Mesman

== All-Tournament Team ==
Player	Team
**Diana Potterveld**	South Dakota State
Delaney Ratcliffe	South Dakota State
Dani Patterson	South Dakota State
Brittany Jensen	South Dakota State
Tori Veth	North Dakota State
Lauren Miller	North Dakota State
Gaby Arnquist	North Dakota State
Corey Strang	South Dakota
Kasha Meyer	South Dakota
Ashley Martin	Oral Roberts
Maria Stordahl	Oral Roberts

MVP in bold
