= 2010 North Dakota State Bison women's soccer team =

American college soccer season

2010 North Dakota State Bison women's soccer
- Conference: Summit League
- Record: 12–5–6 (6–2–1 Summit)
- Head coach: Pete Cuadrado
- Home stadium: Dacotah Field

2010 Summit League women's soccer standings
	Conf.						Overall
Team	W		L		T	PCT	W		L		T	PCT
Oakland ‍†‍‍	8	–	0	–	1	.944	12	–	5	–	3	.675
North Dakota State ‍‍‡‍^{y}	6	–	2	–	1	.722	12	–	5	–	6	.652
South Dakota State ‍‍‍	6	–	2	–	1	.722	11	–	3	–	5	.711
Western Illinois ‍‍‍	6	–	2	–	1	.722	10	–	6	–	5	.595
Oral Roberts ‍‍‍	4	–	4	–	1	.500	9	–	8	–	1	.528
Purdue Fort Wayne ‍‍‍	4	–	4	–	1	.500	7	–	9	–	1	.441
IUPUI ‍‍‍	4	–	5	–	0	.444	8	–	11	–	0	.421
Southern Utah ‍‍‍	2	–	7	–	0	.222	5	–	11	–	1	.324
Centenary ‍‍‍	1	–	8	–	0	.111	4	–	14	–	0	.222
Kansas City ‍‍‍	0	–	7	–	2	.111	1	–	15	–	2	.111
† – Conference champion ‡ – 2010 Summit League Tournament champion y – Invited to the NCAA Tournament; As of March 24, 2023; Rankings from United Soccer Coaches Poll; Source:

The 2010 North Dakota State Bison women's soccer team represented North Dakota State University during the 2010 NCAA Division I women's soccer season. The Bison play their conference games in the Summit League.
NDSU made the Summit League tournament tied for the second seed. The Bison beat third-seeded South Dakota State in the semifinals and then beat fourth-seeded Western Illinois to win the Summit League championship. In the NCAA tournament the Bison fell to 9th ranked Texas A&M in penalties. This was the program's first NCAA tournament appearance since entering Division I.

== Previous season ==
The Bison finished the 2009 season with a 7–2 Summit League record and a 10–8–2 overall record. NDSU entered the postseason tied for first place in the conference, and received the third seed in the Summit League tournament. But they fell to second-seeded IUPUI in the semifinal match to be eliminated from the tournament.

== Team Personnel ==
=== Roster ===
Note: Flags indicate national team as defined under FIFA eligibility rules; some limited exceptions apply. Players may hold more than one non-FIFA nationality.

No.	Pos.	Nation	Player
0	GK	USA	Christie Stemple (Sophomore)
00	GK	CAN	Kathy Kelsey (Redshirt Freshman)
1	GK	USA	Kalani Bertsch (Junior)
2	FW/MF	CAN	Brooklyn Dyce (Sophomore)
3	FW	USA	Katie Luce (Junior)
5	MF/DF	USA	Aubrey Bot (Junior)
6	DF	USA	Marissa Wolfgram (Senior)
7	FW/MF	USA	Morgan DeMike (Junior)
8	FW	CAN	Katie Tallas (Freshman)
9	DF	USA	Danielle DeMent (Junior)
10	FW	USA	Shannon Brooks (Sophomore)
13	FW	USA	Sheri Fitzsimmons (Freshman)

No.	Pos.	Nation	Player
14	FW	USA	Brianna Wersal (Freshman)
15	DF	USA	Laura Wagner (Junior)
16	DF	USA	Megan Dean (Junior)
17	FW/MF	USA	Danielle Boldenow (Junior)
18	MF/DF	USA	Jenna Miller (Freshman)
20	MF	USA	Steph Jacobson (Freshman)
21	MF	USA	Michelle Gaffaney (Junior)
22	DF	USA	Abbey Moenkedick (Junior)
23	FW	USA	Holly Christian (Sophomore)
24	FW/MF	USA	Candice D'Arcangeli (Senior)
25	FW	USA	Quin Ryan (Senior)

=== Coaching staff ===
Position	Staff
Head coach	Pete Cuadrado
Associate head coach	John Ross
Assistant coach	Christie Chappell
Director of Soccer Operations	Ben Schneweis

== Schedule ==
Date Time, TV	Rank^{#}	Opponent^{#}	Result	Record	Site City, State
Non-conference Regular Season
August 20*; 4:30 p.m.		North Dakota	W 4–3	1–0–0	Dacotah Field; Fargo, ND
August 27*; 4:30 p.m.		Green Bay	W 1–0	2–0–0	Dacotah Field; Fargo, ND
September 5*; 1:00 p.m.		vs. Iowa State	T 0–0 2OT	2–0–1	Morrison Stadium; Omaha, NE
September 7*; 6:00 p.m.		at Creighton	T 2–2 2OT	2–0–2	Morrison Stadium; Omaha, NE
September 10*; 4:00 p.m.		vs. Florida Atlantic; Hurricane Cup	W 2–1	3–0–2	Cobb Stadium; Coral Gables, FL
September 12*; 12:30 p.m.		at Miami; Hurricane Cup	L 0–1	3–1–2	Cobb Stadium; Coral Gables, FL
September 14*; 4:30 p.m.		Mary	W 3–1	4–1–2	Dacotah Field; Fargo, ND
September 19*; 12:00 p.m.		Northern Iowa	L 0–1	4–2–2	Dacotah Field; Fargo, ND
September 23*; 7:00 p.m.		at Drake	T 1–1 2OT	4–2–3	Cownie Soccer Complex; Des Monies, IA
September 26*; 12:00 p.m.		South Dakota	W 4–0	5–2–3	Dacotah Field; Fargo, ND
Summit League Regular Season
October 1; 6:00 p.m.		at Oakland	L 1–2	5–3–3 (0–1–0)	Ultimate Soccer Arenas; Pontiac, MI
October 3; 5:00 p.m.		at Purdue Fort Wayne	L 0–3	5–4–3 (0–2–0)	Hefner Soccer Complex; Fort Wayne, IN
October 8; 4:00 p.m.		Western Illinois	W 1–0	6–4–3 (1–2–0)	Dacotah Field; Fargo, ND
October 10; 12:00 p.m.		IUPUI	W 2–1 OT	7–4–3 (2–2–0)	Dacotah Field; Fargo, ND
October 14; 7:00 p.m.		at Kansas City	T 0–0 2OT	7–4–4 (2–2–1)	Durwood Soccer Stadium; Kansas City, MO
October 16; 2:00 p.m.		at Southern Utah	W 1–0 2OT	8–4–4 (3–2–1)	Thunderbird Soccer Field; Cedar City, UT
October 18*; 1:00 p.m.		at Utah Valley	L 0–3	8–5–4	Clyde Field; Orem, UT
October 23; 12:00 p.m.		South Dakota State	W 2–1	9–5–4 (4–2–1)	Dacotah Field; Fargo, ND
October 29; 3:00 p.m.		Centenary	W 9–0	10–5–4 (5–2–1)	Dacotah Field; Fargo, ND
October 31; 12:00 p.m.		Oral Roberts	W 2–1	11–5–4 (6–2–1)	Dacotah Field; Fargo, ND
Summit League Tournament
November 5; 6:00 p.m.	(2)	at (3) South Dakota State; Semifinal	W 1–1 W 4–3 PKs	11–5–5	Fishback Soccer Park; Brookings, SD
November 7; 12:00 p.m.	(2)	vs. (4) Western Illinois; Final	W 3–1	12–5–5	Fishback Soccer Park; Brookings, SD
NCAA Tournament
November 12; 3:00 p.m.		vs. (4) No. 9 Texas A&M; First Round	L 1–1 L 3–4 PKs	12–5–6	Elizabeth Lyle Robbie Stadium; St. Paul, MN
*Non-conference game. ^{#}Rankings from United Soccer Coaches. (#) Tournament seedings in parentheses. All times are in CDT.

== Season Honors ==
=== All-Summit League ===
==== First Team ====
- Abbey Moendkedick

==== Second Team ====
- Kalani Bertsch
- Holly Christian
- Morgan DeMike

==== All-Freshman ====
- Anisha Kinnarath
- Taylor Stainbrook

=== Defensive Player of the Year ===
- Abbey Moenkedick

=== All-Tournament Team ===
- Marissa Wolfgram (MVP)
- Quin Ryan
- Kalani Bertsch
