= 2023 Summit League women's soccer tournament =

2023 Summit League Women's soccer tournament
- Classification: Division I
- Teams: 6
- Matches: 5
- Site: Campus Sites
- Champions: South Dakota State (7th title)
- Winning coach: Brock Thompson (3rd title)
- MVP: Katherine Jones (SDSU)
- Broadcast: Summit League Network
Summit League Women's soccer tournament
«2022	2024»

2023 Summit League women's soccer standings
	Conf.						Overall
Team	W		L		T	PCT	W		L		T	PCT
Denver ‍†‍‍	5	–	1	–	2	.750	9	–	2	–	7	.694
South Dakota State ‍‍‡‍^{y}	4	–	1	–	3	.688	13	–	4	–	3	.725
Oral Roberts ‍‍‍	4	–	3	–	1	.563	8	–	7	–	4	.526
Omaha ‍‍‍	3	–	1	–	4	.625	7	–	5	–	7	.553
South Dakota ‍‍‍	3	–	4	–	1	.438	7	–	7	–	4	.500
Kansas City ‍‍‍	2	–	3	–	3	.438	3	–	7	–	8	.389
North Dakota State ‍‍‍	1	–	3	–	4	.375	5	–	6	–	6	.471
North Dakota ‍‍‍	1	–	3	–	4	.375	5	–	7	–	6	.444
St. Thomas* ‍‍‍	1	–	5	–	2	.250	3	–	7	–	5	.367
* Ineligible for the 2023 NCAA tournament due to transition from Division III
† – Conference champion ‡ – 2023 Summit League tournament champion y – Invited to the NCAA tournament As of December 5, 2023; Rankings from United Soccer Coaches Poll; Source: Summit League

The 2023 Summit League women's soccer tournament was the postseason women's soccer tournament for the Summit League and was held on October 27–29 and November 4, 2023. The five match tournament took place at various campus sites. The six-team single elimination tournament consisted of three rounds based on seeding from regular season conference play. The Omaha Mavericks were the defending champions and were defeated by South Dakota State in the tournament final. South Dakota State won the tournament and earned the Summit League's automatic berth into the 2023 NCAA Division I women's soccer tournament. This win was the Jackrabbits' seventh tournament title.

== Seeding ==
The top six of the nine teams competing during the regular season qualified for the 2023 tournament. Seeding is based on regular season conference records. Tiebreakers were used as needed. Oral Roberts was seeded higher than Omaha due to head-to-head tiebreaker.

Seed	School	Conference Record	Points
1	Denver	5–1–2	17
2	South Dakota State	4–1–3	15
3	Oral Roberts	4–3–1	13
4	Omaha	3–1–4	13
5	South Dakota	3–4–1	10
6	Kansas City	2–3–3	9

== Bracket ==
Quarterfinals; Friday, October 27
4	Omaha	2
5	South Dakota	0
3	Oral Roberts	2
6	Kansas City	1

Semifinals; Sunday, October 29
1	Denver	2 (2)
4	Omaha (pen.)	2 (3)
2	South Dakota State	5
3	Oral Roberts	2

Final; Saturday, November 4
4	Omaha	0
2	South Dakota State	1

== Schedule ==
The 2023 schedule will include the quarterfinals and semifinals being played on October 27–29 and the finals being played on November 4. The quarterfinal and semifinal rounds will be hosted by the top two seeds, the championship game will be hosted by the highest seed remaining.

=== Quarterfinals ===
October 27, 2023	#4 Omaha	2–0	#5 South Dakota	Denver, CO
1:00 PM MT	Emilie Erland 82'; Sophia Green 86'	Report		Stadium: CIBER Field at the University of Denver Soccer Stadium; Attendance: 109; Referee: Heber Estrada; Assistant referees: Jason Hampton; Kevin Lewis; Fourth official: Federico Ruiz

October 27, 2023	#3 Oral Roberts	2–1	#6 Kansas City	Brookings, SD
4:00 PM CT	TEAM 15'; Alani Chaple (yellow card) 23'; Abigail Hoffman 33'	Report	Madison Page 16'; Sophia Smith (yellow card) 34'	Stadium: Fishback Soccer Park; Attendance: 135; Referee: Chris Ruska; Assistant referees: Bejamin Merritt; Andrew Wubben; Fourth official: Nicole Bissell

=== Semifinals ===
October 29, 2023	#2 South Dakota State	5–2	#3 Oral Roberts	Brookings, SD
1 PM CT	Avery LeBlanc 18'; Laney Murdzek 21'; Avery Murdzek 28'; Kayla Anderson 47'; Katelyn Beulke 48'	Report	Kennedy Langebartels 4'; Gabrielle Abbey (yellow card) 60'; Carys Torgesen 68'; Alani Chaple (yellow card) 71'; TEAM (yellow card) 83'; Ariana Fresquez (yellow card) 87'	Stadium: Fishback Soccer Park; Attendance: 236; Referee: Christopher Koloffon; Assistant referees: Connor Dunn; Matthew Von Pinnon; Fourth official: Nicole Bissell

October 29, 2023	#1 Denver	2–2 (a.e.t.) (2–3 p)	#4 Omaha	Denver, CO
5 PM MT	Kaitlyn Glover 26'; Camryn MacMillan (yellow card) 86'; Jadyn Goodrich 89'	Report	Alyssa Kellar 12'; Regan Zimmers 47'	Stadium: CIBER Field at the University of Denver Soccer Stadium; Attendance: 200; Referee: Marcelo Soto; Assistant referees: James Ewer; Oscar Arias; Fourth official: Federico Ruiz
	Penalties
	Kaitlyn Glover (penalty scored); Jordan Crockett (penalty missed); Camryn MacMillan (penalty missed); Ella Frost (penalty scored); Sydney Sharp (penalty missed)		Sophia Green (penalty scored); Reagan Bourgeois (penalty missed); Marissa Gohr (penalty scored); Emilie Erland (penalty scored)

=== Final ===
November 5, 2023	#2 South Dakota State	1–0	#4 Omaha	Brookings, SD
1:00 PM CT	Ellie Gusman 66'; Laney Murdzek (yellow card) 74'			Stadium: Fishback Soccer Park; Attendance: 476; Referee: Dimitar Chavdarov; Assistant referees: Brian Holm; Tyler Dalsin; Fourth official: Joe Masek

== Statistics ==
=== Goalscorers ===
There were 16 goals scored in 5 matches, for an average of 3.2 goals per match (as of November 5, 2023).

1 goal

- Emilie Erland – Omaha
- Sophia Green – Omaha
- Alyssa Kellar – Omaha
- Regan Zimmers – Omaha
- Madison Page – Kansas City
- Abigail Hoffman – Oral Roberts
- Kennedy Langebartels – Oral Roberts
- Carys Torgesen – Oral Roberts
- Avery LeBlanc – South Dakota State
- Laney Murdzek – South Dakota State
- Avery Murdzek – South Dakota State
- Kayla Anderson – South Dakota State
- Katelyn Beulke – South Dakota State
- Ellie Gusman – South Dakota State
- Kaitlyn Glover – Denver
- Jadyn Goodrich – Denver

== All-Tournament Team ==
Player	Team
Katherine Jones	South Dakota State
Kayla Anderson	South Dakota State
Reagan Anderson	South Dakota State
Avery Murdzek	South Dakota State
Emilie Erland	Omaha
Sophia Green	Omaha
Regan Zimmers	Omaha
Kaitlyn Glover	Denver
Camryn MacMillan	Denver
Gabrielle Abbey	Oral Roberts
Jordan Grigsby	Oral Roberts
Maliah Atkins	South Dakota
Riley Moore	Kansas City

Tournament MVP
