= 2017 Summit League women's soccer tournament =

- Classification: Division I
- Teams: 4
- Matches: 3
- Attendance: 420
- Site: Dacotah Field; Fargo, North Dakota
- Champions: Denver (2nd title)
- Winning coach: Jeff Hooker (2nd title)
- Broadcast: TheSummitLeague.org

2017 Summit League women's soccer standings
	Conf.						Overall
Team	W		L		T	PCT	W		L		T	PCT
South Dakota State † ‍‍‍	7	–	0	–	0	1.000	11	–	5	–	3	.658
Denver ‍‍‡‍^{y}	5	–	2	–	0	.714	11	–	9	–	1	.548
Oral Roberts ‍‍‍	5	–	2	–	0	.714	8	–	10	–	1	.447
North Dakota State ‍‍‍	5	–	2	–	0	.714	8	–	11	–	0	.421
Omaha ‍‍‍	3	–	4	–	0	.429	6	–	10	–	1	.382
South Dakota ‍‍‍	2	–	5	–	0	.286	4	–	13	–	0	.235
Western Illinois ‍‍‍	1	–	6	–	0	.143	2	–	15	–	0	.118
Fort Wayne ‍‍‍	0	–	7	–	0	.000	1	–	17	–	0	.056
† – Conference champion ‡ – 2017 Summit League Tournament champion y – Invited to the NCAA Tournament; As of November 12, 2017; Rankings from United Soccer Coaches Poll; Source:Summit League

The 2017 Summit League women's soccer tournament was the postseason women's soccer tournament for the Summit League held on November 2 and 4, 2017. The three-match tournament took place at Dacotah Field in Fargo, North Dakota. The four-team single-elimination tournament consisted of two rounds based on seeding from regular season conference play. The South Dakota State Jackrabbits were the defending champions, but they were eliminated from the 2017 tournament with a 2–0 semifinal loss to the North Dakota State Bison. The Denver Pioneers won the tournament and earned the conference's automatic bid to the NCAA tournament. The tournament win was Denver's second as a member of the conference.

== Bracket ==
Semifinals; Thursday, November 2
1	South Dakota State	0
4	North Dakota State	2
2	Denver	1
3	Oral Roberts	0

Final; Saturday, November 4
4	North Dakota State	1
2	Denver	2

== Schedule ==
=== Semifinals ===
November 2, 2017	#2 Denver	1–0	#3 Oral Roberts	Fargo, North Dakota
11:30 a.m. CDT	Jessie Dancy 1'	Report		Stadium: Dacotah Field; Referee: Artem Sher; Assistant referees: Matt Von Pinnon; John Plambeck; Fourth official: Kevin Mesman

November 2, 2017	#1 South Dakota State	0–2	#4 North Dakota State	Fargo, North Dakota
2:30 p.m. CDT		Report	27' Malley O'Brien; 71' Britney Monteon	Stadium: Dacotah Field; Attendance: 225; Referee: Matt Tiano; Assistant referees: Kevin Mesman; Zijad Repak; Fourth official: Matt Von Pinnon

=== Final ===
November 4, 2017	#4 North Dakota State	1–2	#2 Denver	Fargo, North Dakota
12:00 p.m. CDT	Roxy Roemer 83' (pen.)	Report	32' Jessie Dancy; 85' Angelica Pacheco	Stadium: Dacotah Field; Attendance: 195; Referee: Jorge Oconitrillo; Assistant referees: Kevin Mesman; Dan Stupca; Fourth official: Matt Von Pinnon

== Statistics ==
=== Goalscorers ===
2 Goals

- Jessie Dancy - Denver

1 Goal

- Britney Monteon - North Dakota State
- Malley O'Brien - North Dakota State
- Angelica Pacheco - Denver
- Roxy Roemer - North Dakota State

== See also ==
- Summit League
- 2017 NCAA Division I women's soccer season
- 2017 NCAA Division I Women's Soccer Tournament
- 2017 Summit League Men's Soccer Tournament
