= 2026 Summit League women's soccer tournament =

2026 Summit League Women's soccer tournament
- Classification: Division I
- Teams: 6
- Matches: 5
- Site: Campus Sites
- Champions: Oral Roberts (3rd title)
- Winning coach: Austin Risenhoover (1st title)
- Broadcast: Summit League Network
Summit League Women's soccer tournament
| «2025 | 2027» |

2026 Summit League women's soccer standings
| | Conf. | | | | | | Overall |
| Team | W | | L | | T | PCT | W | | L | | T | PCT |
|---|---|---|---|---|---|---|---|---|---|---|---|---|
| Oral Roberts ‍†‍‡‍^{y} | 7 | – | 0 | – | 2 | .889 | 15 | – | 1 | – | 4 | .850 |
| North Dakota State ‍‍‍ | 5 | – | 3 | – | 2 | .600 | 8 | – | 7 | – | 6 | .524 |
| South Dakota State ‍‍‍ | 5 | – | 3 | – | 2 | .600 | 10 | – | 6 | – | 3 | .605 |
| Omaha ‍‍‍ | 3 | – | 4 | – | 3 | .450 | 4 | – | 9 | – | 6 | .368 |
| South Dakota ‍‍‍ | 3 | – | 4 | – | 3 | .450 | 7 | – | 8 | – | 5 | .475 |
| North Dakota ‍‍‍ | 3 | – | 6 | – | 1 | .350 | 6 | – | 9 | – | 2 | .412 |
| St. Thomas ‍‍‍ | 3 | – | 6 | – | 1 | .350 | 5 | – | 12 | – | 2 | .316 |
| Kansas City ‍‍‍ | 1 | – | 5 | – | 4 | .300 | 2 | – | 11 | – | 5 | .250 |
† – Conference champion ‡ – Summit League tournament champion y – Invited to the NCAA tournament As of November 15, 2026; Rankings from United Soccer Coaches Poll; Source: Summit League

The 2026 Summit League women's soccer tournament was the postseason women's soccer tournament for the Summit League for the 2026 NCAA Division I women's soccer season. It was held on November 6, 12, and 15, 2026. The five-match tournament took place at various campus sites. The six-team single elimination tournament consisted of three rounds based on seeding from regular season conference play.

== Seeding ==
The league changed up their seeding for this season. The league office split the standings into two pods. Pod A includes North Dakota, North Dakota State, South Dakota, and South Dakota State. Pod B includes Kansas City, Omaha, Oral Roberts, and St. Thomas. The top three from each pod will make the tournament, based on conference points. The runner-up in each pod will host a quarterfinal game against the opposite pod's third place team, and the top seed will host the semifinals and championship games.

| Pod | Place | School | Conference Record | Points | Tiebreaker |
|---|---|---|---|---|---|
| A | 1 | North Dakota State | 5–3–2 | 17 | 1–0 vs. South Dakota St |
| A | 2 | South Dakota State | 5–3–2 | 17 | 0–1 vs. North Dakota St |
| A | 3 | South Dakota | 3–4–3 | 12 | |
| A | 4 | North Dakota | 3–6–1 | 10 | |
| B | 1 | Oral Roberts | 8–0–2 | 26 | |
| B | 2 | Omaha | 3–4–3 | 12 | |
| B | 3 | St. Thomas | 3–6–1 | 10 | |
| B | 4 | Kansas City | 1–5–4 | 7 | |

== Bracket ==
Quarterfinals; Friday, November 6
A2 | South Dakota State | 2
B3 | St. Thomas (2OT) | 3
B2 | Omaha | 0 (3)
A3 | South Dakota (PK's) | 0 (4)

Semifinals; Thursday, November 12
B1 | Oral Roberts | 3
B3 | St. Thomas | 0
A1 | North Dakota State | 1
A3 | South Dakota | 0

Final; Sunday, November 15
B1 | Oral Roberts | 1
A1 | North Dakota State | 0

== Schedule ==
The 2026 schedule will include the quarterfinals being played on November 6 and 7, the semifinals on November 11 and 12, and the final match on November 14. In the quarterfinals, the runner up in each pod will host the third place team from the opposite pod; subsequently, both the semifinals and the championship game will be hosted by the top seed.

=== Quarterfinals ===
| November 6, 2026 | #B2 Omaha | 0–0 (a.e.t.) (3–4 p) | #A3 South Dakota | Omaha, NE |
| 2:30 pm | Team (yellow card) 76' | Report | Charley Kort (yellow card) 14'; Jasmyn Brown (yellow card) 76' | Stadium: Caniglia Field; Attendance: 521; Referee: Kyle Healey; Assistant referees: Brendan Sweetman; Hallory Sutherland; Fourth official: Lauren Parliament |
| | Penalties |
| | Payten Ivins (penalty scored); Blanche Brethes Vacchiani (penalty missed); Charley Kort (penalty scored); Kendall Dobberstein (penalty missed); Emma Hampton (penalty scored) | | Brooke Conway (penalty scored); Klarissa Vega (penalty scored); Sam Luft (penalty scored); Gabbie Ryan (penalty missed); Riley Reed (penalty scored) |

| November 6, 2026 | #A2 South Dakota State | 2–3 (a.e.t.) | #B3 St. Thomas | Brookings, SD |
| 6:00 pm | Abbi Gibbs 73'; Jenna Maloy 82' | Report | Kalli Knowles 54'; Team (yellow card) 87'; Team (yellow card) 87'; Becca Smith 88'; Izzy McEwan 106' | Stadium: Dana J. Dykhouse Stadium; Attendance: 255; Referee: Chris Ruska; Assistant referees: Timothy Thomas; Joshua Mahoney; Fourth official: Chris Limmer |

=== Semifinals ===
| November 12, 2026 | #A1 North Dakota State | 1–0 | #A3 South Dakota | Tulsa, OK |
| 2:00 pm | Morgan Russmann 23' | Report | Taylor Mulligan (yellow card) 34'; Mali Van Meeteren (yellow card) 54'; Riley Reed (yellow card) 70' | Stadium: Case Soccer Complex; Attendance: 102 |

| November 12, 2026 | #B1 Oral Roberts | 3–0 | #B3 St. Thomas | Tulsa, OK |
| 6:00 pm | Carys Torgesen 22'; Addy Johnson 33'; Cameron Silva 70' | Report | | Stadium: Case Soccer Complex; Attendance: 526 |

=== Final ===
| November 15, 2026 | #A1 North Dakota State | 0–1 | #B1 Oral Roberts | Tulsa, OK |
| 1:00 pm | Team (yellow card) 34' | | Zoe McCabe 7'; Cameron Silva (yellow card) 49'; Team (yellow card) 76' | Stadium: Case Soccer Complex; Attendance: 820; Referee: Kylie Rhodes |

== Statistics ==
=== Goalscorers ===
There were 10 goals scored in 5 matches, for an average of 2 goals per match (as of November 15, 2026).

1 goal

- Abbi Gibbs – South Dakota State
- Jenna Maloy – South Dakota State
- Kalli Knowles – St. Thomas
- Becca Smith – St. Thomas
- Izzy McEwan – St. Thomas
- Morgan Mussmann – North Dakota State
- Carys Torgesen – Oral Roberts
- Addy Johnson – Oral Roberts
- Cameron Silva – Oral Roberts
- Zoe McCabe – Oral Roberts

== All–Tournament Team ==
| Player | Team |
|---|---|
| Carys Torgesen (MVP) | Oral Roberts |
| Precious Edosa | Oral Roberts |
| Zoe McCabe | Oral Roberts |
| Savannah Spielman | Oral Roberts |
| Amaya Garrett | North Dakota State |
| Payton Mulberry | North Dakota State |
| Morgan Russmann | North Dakota State |
| Sophia Alvarez | St. Thomas |
| Sofia Englund | St. Thomas |
| Cambell Fischer | South Dakota |
| Kiah Pieters | South Dakota |
| Taryn Hettich | South Dakota State |
| Grace Bartlam | Omaha |
