= 2016 Summit League women's soccer tournament =

- Classification: Division I
- Teams: 4
- Matches: 3
- Site: Dacotah Field; Fargo, North Dakota
- Champions: South Dakota State (4th title)
- Winning coach: Lang Wedemeyer (4th title)

2016 Summit League women's soccer standings
	Conf.						Overall
Team	W		L		T	PCT	W		L		T	PCT
North Dakota State ‍†‍‍	5	–	2	–	1	.688	10	–	8	–	1	.553
Denver ‍†‍‍	5	–	2	–	1	.688	8	–	9	–	2	.474
Oral Roberts ‍‍‍	5	–	3	–	0	.625	11	–	9	–	2	.545
South Dakota State ‍‍‡‍^{y}	5	–	3	–	0	.625	10	–	7	–	4	.571
South Dakota ‍‍‍	4	–	4	–	0	.500	5	–	13	–	1	.289
IUPUI ‍‍‍	3	–	3	–	2	.500	9	–	7	–	3	.553
Omaha ‍‍‍	3	–	4	–	1	.438	5	–	11	–	3	.342
Western Illinois ‍‍‍	2	–	5	–	1	.313	4	–	11	–	2	.294
Fort Wayne ‍‍‍	0	–	6	–	2	.125	3	–	14	–	2	.211
† – Conference champion ‡ – 2016 Summit League Tournament champion y – Invited to the NCAA tournament As of 2016-11-14; Rankings from NSCAA

The 2016 Summit League women's soccer tournament was the postseason women's soccer tournament for the Summit League, held from November 3 to 5, 2016. The three match tournament was held at Dacotah Field in Fargo, North Dakota. The four team single-elimination tournament consisted of two rounds based on seeding from regular season conference play. The South Dakota State Jackrabbits were the three-time defending tournament champions after defeating the North Dakota State Bison 3–0 in the championship match in 2015.

== Bracket ==
Semifinals; Thursday, November 3
1	North Dakota State	0
4	Oral Roberts	2
2	Denver	1 (2)
3	South Dakota State	1 (4)

Final; Saturday, November 5
4	Oral Roberts	0 (2)
3	South Dakota State	0 (3)

== Schedule ==
=== Semi-finals ===
November 3, 2016	#1 North Dakota State	0–2	#4 Oral Roberts	Fargo, North Dakota
12:00 p.m. CST		Report	Lexi Jones 14'; Brittney Lawrence 56'	Stadium: Dacotah Field; Referee: Artem Sher

November 3, 2016	#2 Denver	1–1 (a.e.t.) (2–4 p)	#3 South Dakota State	Fargo, North Dakota
3:00 p.m. CST	Angelica Pacheco 11'	Report	Darien Poelstra 76'	Stadium: Dacotah Field; Referee: Matt Tiano
	Penalties
	Lilly McSwain (penalty missed); Cheyenne Shorts (penalty scored); Hannah Adler (penalty missed); Francesca Garzelloni (penalty scored)		(penalty scored) Ashley Adams; (penalty scored) Nicole Hatcher; (penalty scored) Annie Williams; (penalty scored) Shelby Raper

=== Final ===
November 5, 2016	#4 Oral Roberts	0–0 (a.e.t.) (2–3 p)	#3 South Dakota State	Fargo, North Dakota
11:00 a.m. CST		Report		Stadium: Dacotah Field; Referee: Troy Cohrs
	Penalties
	Sierra Beall (penalty missed); Megan Guico (penalty missed); Lexi Jones (penalty missed); Chloe Basnett (penalty scored); Caroline Frank (penalty scored)		(penalty scored) Annie Williams; (penalty missed) Nicole Hatcher; (penalty scored) Ashley Adams; (penalty missed) Shelby Raper; (penalty scored) Tori Poole

== See also ==
- Summit League
- 2016 NCAA Division I women's soccer season
- 2016 NCAA Division I Women's Soccer Tournament
