= 2015 Summit League softball tournament =

- Teams: 6
- Format: Double-elimination tournament
- Finals site: Ellig Sports Complex; Fargo, North Dakota
- Television: gobison.com/watch

The 2015 Summit League softball tournament was held at Ellig Sports Complex on the campus of the North Dakota State University in Fargo, North Dakota from May 7 through May 10, 2015. The tournament winner earned The Summit League's automatic bid to the 2015 NCAA Division I softball tournament. All games were streamed online on gobison.com/watch.

== Tournament ==
=== Elimination Thursday ===
1st Round Elimination Game; May 7th
4	Western Illinois	6
5	South Dakota State	7

1st Round Elimination Game; May 7th
3	IUPUI	13
6	IPFW	0^{(5)}

=== Double Elimination Tournament ===
2nd Round; May 8
1	North Dakota State	16
5	South Dakota State	0^{(5)}
2	South Dakota	9
3	IUPUI	11
Lower round 1
2	South Dakota	18
5	South Dakota State	7

Semifinals; May 9
1	North Dakota State	3
3	IUPUI	2
Lower final
3	IUPUI	0
2	South Dakota	1

Championship; May 9 & 10
1	North Dakota State	13	–
2	South Dakota	2^{(5)}	–

- All times listed are Central Daylight Time.
