= Mabee Center =

American arena in Tulsa, Oklahoma

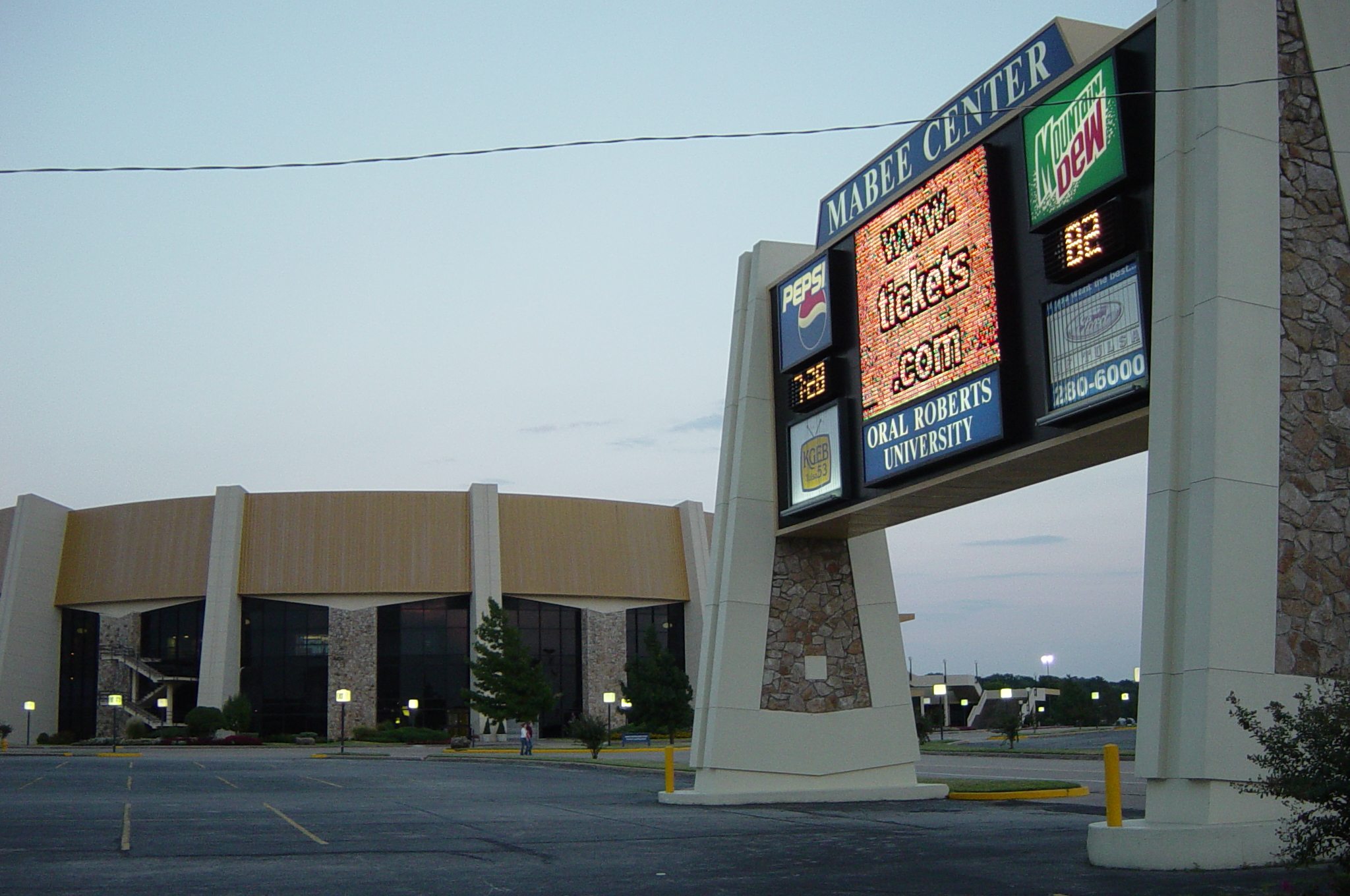
- Interactive map of Mabee Center
- Location: 7777 South Lewis Avenue; Tulsa, Oklahoma 74171
- Coordinates: 36.04789°N 95.95573°W
- Owner: Oral Roberts University
- Operator: Oral Roberts University
- Capacity: Basketball - 9,026; Concerts - 10,094
- Surface: Multi-surface

Construction
- Groundbreaking: 1970
- Opened: 1972
- Architect: Frank Wallace
- Structural engineer: Lloyd W. Abbott

Tenant
- Oral Roberts Golden Eagles (Men's NCAA Basketball) (1972–present)

Website
- https://mabeecenter.com/

Mabee Center is a 10,094-seat multi-purpose arena, located on the campus of Oral Roberts University, in Tulsa, Oklahoma, United States. The building opened in 1972 and was designed by architect Frank Wallace, who designed most of the buildings on the ORU campus. It carries the name of Tulsa oilman John Mabee, whose foundation donated $1 million toward its construction.

The facility received several upgrades in 2021 including: new arena seats, exterior blue paint, blue glass panels, a new sound system, all new LED house lights, concourse level remodeling, digital screens, wifi, and new suites. An adjacent building, smaller but similar in shape, is known as the "Global Learning Center".

Since it opened in 1972, the Mabee Center has hosted entertainment events, as well as the NAIA national men's basketball championship (1994–1998), five NCAA men's first-round or regional tournaments (1974, 1975, 1978, 1982, 1985) and the Midwestern City Conference (now Horizon League) men's basketball conference tournaments (1982, 1985).

It is home to the Oral Roberts Golden Eagles men's and women's basketball teams and was Eastern Oklahoma's largest arena until the BOK Center was built. Mabee Center was inducted into the Oklahoma Music Hall of Fame in 2013.

== See also ==
- List of NCAA Division I basketball arenas
