= 2010 NCAA Division I women's soccer tournament =

2010 NCAA women's soccer tournament
Women's College Cup (semifinals & final)

Tournament details
- Country: United States
- Dates: November 12 – December 5, 2010
- Teams: 64

Final positions
- Champions: Notre Dame Fighting Irish (3rd title, 12th College Cup)
- Runners-up: Stanford Cardinal (2nd title match, 4th College Cup)
- Semifinalists: Boston College Eagles (1st College Cup); Ohio State Buckeyes (1st College Cup)

Tournament statistics
- Matches played: 63
- Goals scored: 180 (2.86 per match)
- Attendance: 53,145 (844 per match)
- Top goal scorer(s): Melissa Henderson, ND (3)

Awards
- Best player: Offensive–Melissa Henderson (ND); Defensive–Jessica Schuveiller (ND)

The 2010 NCAA Division I women's soccer tournament (also known as the 2010 Women's College Cup) was the 29th annual single-elimination tournament to determine the national champion of NCAA Division I women's collegiate soccer. The semifinals and championship game were played at WakeMed Soccer Park in Cary, North Carolina from December 3–5, 2010 while the preceding rounds were played at various sites across the country from November 12–28.

Notre Dame defeated Stanford in the final, 1–0, to win their third national title. The Fighting Irish (21–2–2) were coached by Randy Waldrum.

The most outstanding offensive player was Melissa Henderson from Notre Dame, and the most outstanding defensive player was Jessica Schuveiller, also from Notre Dame. Henderson and Schuveiller, alongside nine other players, were named to the All-Tournament team. Henderson was also the tournament's leading scorer, with 3 goals and 4 assists.

== Qualification ==
All Division I women's soccer programs were eligible to qualify for the tournament. The tournament field remained fixed at 64 teams.

== Format ==
Just as before, the final two rounds, deemed the Women's College Cup, were played at a pre-determined neutral site. All other rounds were played on campus sites at the home field of the higher-seeded team. The only exceptions were the first two rounds, which were played at regional campus sites. The top sixteen teams hosted four team-regionals on their home fields (with some exceptions, noted below) during the tournament's first weekend.

=== National seeds ===
#1 Seeds	#2 Seeds	#3 Seeds	#4 Seeds
Maryland (17–2–2); North Carolina (17–2–2); Portland (18–1–1); Stanford (18–0–2)	Boston College (13–6–1); Florida (18–2–2); Florida State (13–5–1); Virginia (13–4–2)	Marquette (15–4–2); Ohio State (14–4–1); Oklahoma State (17–3–2); West Virginia (16–4–1)	Notre Dame (15–2–2); Texas A&M (15–4–2); UCF (14–4–3); Wake Forest (12–7–3)

=== Teams ===
Stanford Regional
Seed	School	Conference	Berth Type	Record
	Auburn	SEC	At-large	11–7–2
	BYU	Mountain West	Automatic	16–3–2
	Central Michigan	MAC	Automatic	16–4–1
2	Florida State	ACC	At-large	13–5–1
	Fresno State	WAC	Automatic	09–8–5
	Long Beach State	Big West	Automatic	14–5–2
3	Marquette	Big East	At-large	15–4–2
	Middle Tenn. State	Sun Belt	Automatic	13–8–2
	Milwaukee	Horizon	Automatic	12–6–2
	Sacramento State	Big Sky	Automatic	09–9–1
	Santa Clara	West Coast	At-large	12–6–2
	South Florida	Big East	At-large	13–5–3
1	Stanford	Pac-12	Automatic	18–0–2
4	UCF	Conference USA	At-large	14–4–3
	UCLA	Pac-10	At-large	12–7–1
	Wisconsin	Big Ten	At-large	10–4–4

Maryland Regional
Seed	School	Conference	Berth Type	Record
	Creighton	Missouri Valley	Automatic	15–3–2
	Dayton	Atlantic 10	Automatic	18–3
	Georgetown	Big East	At-large	13–6–1
	High Point	Big South	Automatic	10–10–1
	Lehigh	Patriot	Automatic	11–4–4
1	Maryland	ACC	At-large	17–2–2
	Minnesota	Big Ten	At-large	12–5–3
	North Dakota State	Summit	Automatic	12–5–5
3	Ohio State	Big Ten	Auto (shared)	14–4–1
	Saint Francis (PA)	Northeast	Automatic	15–4–2
	Siena	MAAC	Automatic	17–3
	South Carolina	SEC	At-large	14–5–4
4	Texas A&M	Big 12	At-large	15–4–2
	UNC-Greensboro	Southern	Automatic	19–1–1
2	Virginia	ACC	At-large	13–4–2
	Virginia Tech	ACC	At-large	10–9–1

Portland Regional
Seed	School	Conference	Berth Type	Record
	Arizona State	Pac-10	At-large	09–7–3
2	Boston College	ACC	At-large	13–6–1
	Boston U.	America East	Automatic	16–5
	Connecticut	Big East	At-large	10–9–3
	Hofstra	CAA	At-large	18–2
	Morehead State	Ohio Valley	Automatic	13–6–1
	Oklahoma	Big 12	At-large	12–7–3
	Penn	Ivy League	Automatic	09–6–2
	Penn State	Big Ten	Auto (shared)	10–8–1
1	Portland	West Coast	Automatic	18–1–1
	San Diego	West Coast	At-large	11–7–2
	UC-Irvine	Big West	At-large	17–2–2
	UTSA	Southland	Automatic	13–7–2
4	Wake Forest	ACC	Automatic	12–7–3
	Washington	Pac-10	At-large	11–8–1
3	West Virginia	Big East	Automatic	16–4–1

North Carolina Regional
Seed	School	Conference	Berth Type	Record
	California	Pac-10	At-large	09–5–5
	Duke	ACC	At-large	10–7–3
2	Florida	SEC	Automatic	18–2–2
	Illinois	Big Ten	At-large	13–4–1
	Jackson State	SWAC	Automatic	13–6–1
	James Madison	CAA	Automatic	14–6–1
	Memphis	Conference USA	Automatic	15–3–3
	Mercer	Atlantic Sun	Automatic	10–8–1
	Michigan	Big Ten	At-large	10–4–4
	New Mexico	Mountain West	At-large	12–2–5
1	North Carolina	ACC	At-large	17–2–2
4	Notre Dame	Big East	At-large	15–2–2
3	Oklahoma State	Big 12	Automatic	17–3–2
	Oregon State	Pac-10	At-large	15–3–1
	Texas	Big 12	At-large	11–5–4
	USC	Pac-10	At-large	12–5–3

== Bracket ==
=== Stanford Bracket ===
First round November 12; Regional Campus Sites
1	Stanford	3
Sacramento State	0
Maloney Field • Stanford, CA
Long Beach State	0
Santa Clara	1
UCLA	0(4)
BYU	0(3)
Drake Stadium • Los Angeles, CA
Fresno State	1
4	UCF	2
3	Marquette	1
Central Michigan	0
Valley Fields • Milwaukee, WI
Milwaukee	1
Wisconsin	2
South Florida	3
Auburn	1
Seminole Soccer Complex • Tallahassee, FL
Middle Tennessee State	0
2	Florida State	3

Second round November 14; Regional Campus Sites
1	Stanford	2
Santa Clara	1
UCLA	2
4	UCF	1
3	Marquette	2(5)
Wisconsin	2(4)
South Florida	1
2	Florida State	2

Round of 16; November 19–21; Campus Sites
1	Stanford*	3
UCLA	0
3	Marquette	0
2	Florida State*	3

Quarterfinals; November 26–28; Campus Sites
1	Stanford*	5
2	Florida State	0

=== Portland Bracket ===
First round November 12; Regional Campus Sites
2	Boston College	2
Boston University	1
Newton Soccer Complex • Newton, MA
Connecticut	0
Hofstra	1
Penn State	1
Penn	0
Dlesk Stadium • Morgantown, WV
Morehead State	0
3	West Virginia	2
4	Wake Forest	1
San Diego	0
Spry Stadium • Winston-Salem, NC
UC Irvine	2
Arizona State	1
Oklahoma	0
Washington	4
Merlo Field • Portland, OR
UTSA	0
1	Portland	9

Second round November 14; Regional Campus Sites
2	Boston College	3
Hofstra	1
Penn State	1
3	West Virginia	2
4	Wake Forest	0
UC Irvine	2
Washington	2
1	Portland	1

Round of 16; November 19–21; Campus Sites
2	Boston College*	4
3	West Virginia	0
UC Irvine	0
Washington* (OT)	1

Quarterfinals; November 26–28; Campus Sites
2	Boston College* (OT)	1
Washington	0

=== Maryland Bracket ===
First round November 12; Regional Campus Sites
1	Maryland	4
High Point	1
Ludwig Field • College Park, MD
Siena	1
Georgetown	5
Creighton	2
Minnesota	4
Robbie Stadium • St. Paul, MN
North Dakota State	1(3)
4	Texas A&M	1(4)
3	Ohio State (2OT)	1
St. Francis (PA)	0
Owens Memorial Stadium • Columbus, OH
Dayton	3
Virginia Tech	0
UNC Greensboro	1
South Carolina	2
Klöckner Stadium • Charlottesville, VA
Lehigh	0
2	Virginia	3

Second round November 14; Regional Campus Sites
1	Maryland	1(2)
Georgetown	1(3)
Minnesota	2
4	Texas A&M	0
3	Ohio State	0(4)
Dayton	0(2)
South Carolina	0
2	Virginia	3

Round of 16; November 19–21; Campus Sites
Georgetown	1
Minnesota	0
3	Ohio State	3
2	Virginia*	2

Quarterfinals; November 26–28; Campus Sites
Georgetown	0
3	Ohio State*	2

=== North Carolina Bracket ===
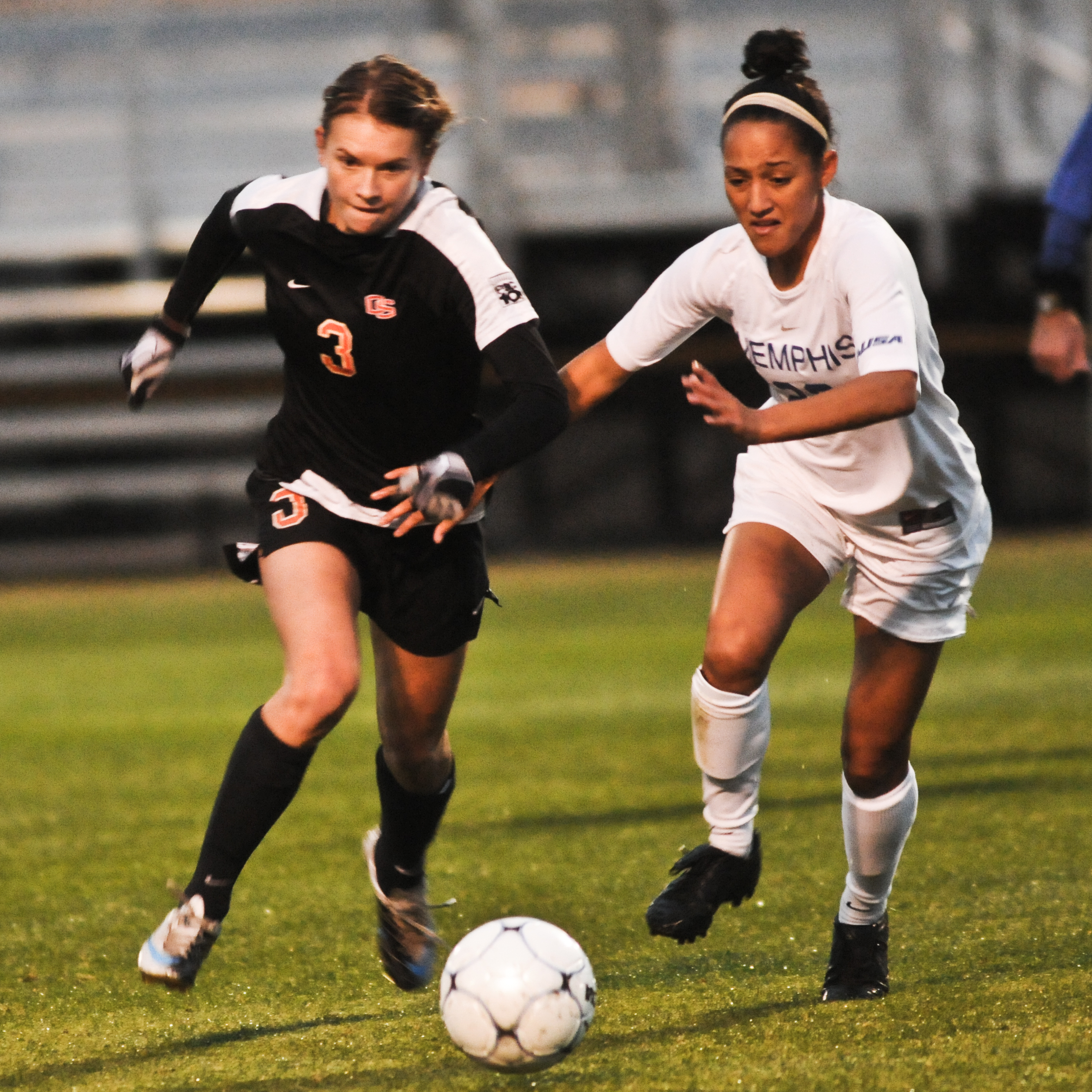
A match between Oregon State and Memphis in the North Carolina Bracket

First round November 12; Regional Campus Sites
2	Florida	3
Mercer	0
Pressly Stadium • Gainesville, FL
California	1
Duke	2
Memphis	0
Oregon State	5
Cowgirl Soccer Complex • Stillwater, OK
Michigan	1
3	Oklahoma State	2
4	Notre Dame	3
New Mexico	0
Alumni Field • Notre Dame, IN
Illinois	1
USC	3
Texas	1
James Madison	3
Fetzer Field • Chapel Hill, NC
Jackson State	0
1	North Carolina	5

Second round November 14; Regional Campus Sites
2	Florida	0(2)
Duke	0(4)
Oregon State	1
3	Oklahoma State	2
4	Notre Dame	4
USC	0
James Madison	1
1	North Carolina	3

Round of 16; November 19–21; Campus Sites
Duke	0
3	Oklahoma State*	2
4	Notre Dame	4
1	North Carolina*	1

Quarterfinals; November 26–28; Campus Sites
3	Oklahoma State*	0
4	Notre Dame	2

=== College Cup ===
Semifinals; December 3 WakeMed Soccer Park; Cary, North Carolina
1	Stanford	1
2	Boston College	0
3	Ohio State	0
4	Notre Dame	1

Championship; December 5 WakeMed Soccer Park; Cary, North Carolina
1	Stanford	0
4	Notre Dame	1

== All-tournament team ==
- Melissa Henderson, Notre Dame (most outstanding offensive player)
- Jessica Schuveiller, Notre Dame (most outstanding defensive player)
- Rose Augustin, Notre Dame
- Courtney Barg, Notre Dame
- Katie Baumgardner, Ohio State
- Hanna Cerrone, Boston College
- Mandy Laddish, Notre Dame
- (Canada) Adriana Leon, Notre Dame
- Camille Levin, Stanford
- Emily Oliver, Stanford
- Christen Press, Stanford

== See also ==
- NCAA Women's Soccer Championships (Division II, Division III)
- NCAA Men's Soccer Championships (Division I, Division II, Division III)
