= North Dakota State Bison women's soccer =

American college women's soccer team

- University: North Dakota State University
- Head coach: Mike Regan (9th season)
- Conference: Summit League
- Location: Fargo, North Dakota, US
- Stadium: Dacotah Field (capacity: 2,600)
- Nickname: Bison
- Colors: Green and yellow

NCAA tournament appearances
- NCAA Division II; 1999; NCAA Division I 2010

Conference tournament championships
- Summit League; 2010

Conference regular season championships
- North Central Conference (Div II); 1999; Summit League; 2009, 2015, 2016, 2024

The North Dakota State Bison soccer team is the NCAA Division I women's soccer team that represents North Dakota State University in Fargo, North Dakota. The program began its first season in 1995 under head coach Gordon Henderson. The Bison are currently coached by Mike Regan in his 9th year coaching the team.

== History ==
=== Division II Days (1995–2004) ===
North Dakota State competed in Division II from their first season in 1995, until the school's transition to Division I began in 2004. During that time, the Bison competed in the North Central Conference and finished in the top four each year except for 2002. NDSU won the conference in 1999 and made the NCAA Tournament in Division II, that was the only time they would make the national tournament before entering Division I. The Bison held a 93-59-8 overall record while in Division II and a 25-21-3 conference record.

=== Division I days (2004–present) ===
In 2004, the school started their transition to Division I, and the team played as Division I independents for 2004 and 2005. In that time span, the Bison went 16-16-2. Then in 2006, NDSU played in the United Soccer Conference for one year. They finished with a 13-7-1 overall record, a 3-0-0 conference record that landed them as the first place team in the West division. However, the team was still ineligible for NCAA Tournament play due to their ongoing transition to Division I. Then in the Summer of 2007, NDSU joined the Summit League in all sports except football and wrestling. While the Bison did not finish well in their first two years in the conference, they managed to finish the regular season tied for first place in the 2009 season but lost in the Summit League tournament. Then in the next season (2010), the team finished the regular season tied for second place and beat Western Illinois to reach their first Division I NCAA Tournament. In the first round, the Bison would fall to Texas A&M.

Since that tournament berth, the Bison have finished in the top four of the Summit League eight times consecutively from 2011 to 2018. NDSU finished the regular season in first place three times since 2011, in 2015, 2016 and 2024, but have not managed to win the conference tournament and return to the NCAA tournament.

== Season-by-season history ==
Season	Head coach	Season result							Tournament results	
Season	Head coach	Overall			Conference				Conference	NCAA
Season	Head coach	Wins	Losses	Ties	Wins	Losses	Ties	Finish	Conference	NCAA
1995	Gordon Henderson	6	8	0	No Conference					—
1996	Gordon Henderson	14	5	0	2	1	0	2nd	No Tournament	–
1997	Gordon Henderson	7	11	0	0	3	0	4th	No Tournament	–
1998	Matt Townsend	11	5	1	2	1	0	2nd	No Tournament	–
1999	Matt Townsend	14	3	2	4	1	1	2nd	No Tournament	NCAA 1st Round
2000	Matt Townsend	11	7	1	6	3	1	4th	Runner up	–
2001	Matt Townsend	10	9	0	5	4	0	T-4th	–	–
2002	Matt Townsend	9	8	2	3	5	0	6th	–	–
2003	Pete Cuadrado	11	3	2	3	3	1	T-4th	–	–
2004	Pete Cuadrado	5	11	1	No Conference					Ineligible due to Transition to Division I
2005	Pete Cuadrado	11	5	1	No Conference					Ineligible due to Transition to Division I
2006	Pete Cuadrado	13	7	1	3	0	0	1st-West	Runner up	Ineligible due to Transition to Division I
2007	Pete Cuadrado	11	7	1	3	4	1	5th	–	Ineligible due to Transition to Division I
2008	Pete Cuadrado	5	12	2	2	5	1	7th	–	–
2009	Pete Cuadrado	10	8	2	7	2	0	T-1st	Semifinal	–
2010	Pete Cuadrado	12	5	6	6	2	1	T-2nd	Champions	NCAA 1st Round
2011	Pete Cuadrado	15	4	2	7	1	1	2nd	Runner-up	–
2012	Mark Cook	8	10	0	5	3	0	3rd	Semifinal	–
2013	Mark Cook	9	10	0	4	3	0	3rd	Runner-up	–
2014	Mark Cook	8	8	2	4	2	2	4th	Semifinal	–
2015	Mark Cook	13	6	1	7	0	1	1st	Runner up	–
2016	Mark Cook	10	8	1	5	2	1	1st	Semifinal	–
2017	Mark Cook	8	11	0	5	2	0	T-2nd	Runner up	–
2018	Mike Regan	9	7	0	6	2	0	3rd	Semifinal	–
2019	Mike Regan	8	7	3	3	3	2	T-5th	–	–
2020^	Mike Regan	7	8	1	7	8	1	5th	–	–
2021	Mike Regan	3	12	1	3	6	0	8th	–	–
2022	Mike Regan	8	9	3	4	5	0	5th	Quarterfinal^^	–
2023	Mike Regan	5	6	6	1	3	4	7th	–	–
2024	Mike Regan	10	6	3	6	1	1	1st	Semifinal	–
2025	Mike Regan	1	6	1	5	12	1	8th	–	–
2026	Mike Regan	5	3	2	8	7	6	T-2nd	Runner–up	–

^ – Played in Spring 2021
^^ – Starting with the 2022 season, the Summit League expanded the women's soccer tournament to the top six teams instead of four.

== Postseason history ==
=== NCAA Division I Tournament results ===
The Bison have appeared in one NCAA Division I Tournament. Their combined record is 0–1.

Year	Seed	Round	Opponent	Result
2010		First round	#4 Texas A&M	L/SO 1(3)-1(4)

=== NCAA Division II Tournament results ===
The Bison appeared in one NCAA Division II Tournament. Their combined record was 0–1.

Year	Seed	Round	Opponent	Result
1999		First round	#7 Northern Kentucky	L 0–1
