= North Dakota Fighting Hawks women's soccer =

American college soccer team

- Founded: 1999
- University: University of North Dakota
- Head coach: Henrik Sohn (2nd season)
- Conference: Summit
- Location: Grand Forks, North Dakota, US
- Stadium: Bronson Field
- Nickname: Fighting Hawks
- Colors: Kelly green and white
Home	Away

The North Dakota Fighting Hawks women's soccer team in Grand Forks, North Dakota competes in the Summit League. The team's head coach is Henrik Sohn.

== Head coaches ==
#	Name	Term
1	Niel Sedgwick	1999–2000
2	Angela Morrison	2001
3	Matt Grandstrand	2002–2003
4	Tim Bennett	2004
5	Brock Thompson	2005–2007
6	Krisitin Gay	2008–2012
7	Matt Kellogg	2013–2016
8	Chris Logan	2017–2024
9	Henrik Sohn	2025–present
