= Omaha Mavericks =

Sports teams of the University of Nebraska Omaha

- University: University of Nebraska Omaha
- Nickname: Mavericks
- NCAA: Division I
- Conference: Summit League (primary); NCHC (men's ice hockey); MAC (men's tennis)
- Athletic director: Adrian Dowell
- Location: Omaha, Nebraska
- Varsity teams: 16
- Basketball arena: Baxter Arena
- Ice hockey arena: Baxter Arena
- Baseball stadium: Tal Anderson Field
- Softball stadium: Connie Claussen Field
- Soccer stadium: Al F. Caniglia Field
- Other venues: Sapp Fieldhouse; School of Health & Kinesiology
- Colors: Crimson and black
- Mascot: Durango
- Fight song: UNO Fite
- Website: omavs.com
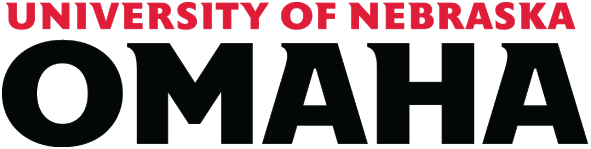

Team NCAA championships
- 10

The Omaha Mavericks are the sports teams of the University of Nebraska Omaha. They participate in the NCAA's Division I and in the Summit League, except in ice hockey, where they compete in the National Collegiate Hockey Conference (NCHC).

== History ==
A long-time member of the North Central Conference, UNO joined the Mid-America Intercollegiate Athletics Association on July 1, 2008 after the NCC ceased operations. In March 2011, the school announced its intentions to move up from Division II to Division I and join the Summit League. In the process it would abandon its football and wrestling programs to better fit with the sports sponsored by The Summit League and to maintain Title IX compliance.

Wrestling had been the school's most successful sport with national championships in 1991, 2004, 2005, 2006, 2009, 2010 and 2011. Football also had a long, successful history with multiple conference championships (1983–1984, 1996, 1998, 2000, 2004–2007) and several NCAA Division II tournament appearances. Marlin Briscoe, the first black starting quarterback in modern American professional football (the American Football League), played for UNO from 1964–1967. Former Maverick football players currently playing in the NFL include Zach Miller, Kenny Onatolu, and Greg Zuerlein. As part of its Division I move, Omaha added men's soccer (becoming the only school in the University of Nebraska system to sponsor the sport for men) and men's golf, both of which are sponsored by The Summit League. Hockey moved to the new NCHC starting with the 2013–14 season.

In the 1975 AIAW Women's College World Series, the Maverettes (as they were then known) softball team defeated Northern Iowa, 6–4, in the deciding game, led by pitcher Pat Linson to earn the university's first team national championship. In 1969–1979, the team played in ten of the first eleven Women's College World Series ever held, missing only in 1974.

The women's soccer (2005) and softball (2001) teams have won NCAA's Division II national championships, as had the wrestling team, who were seven-time national champions (1991, 2004–06, 2009–11).

=== Conference affiliations ===
- Independent – 1910–11 to 1933–34
- North Central Conference – 1934–35 to 1945–46
- Independent – 1946–47 to 1958–59
- Central Intercollegiate Conference (Note: Nebraska–Omaha joined that conference for all sports (including football), with the exception of men's basketball.) – 1959–60 to 1966–67
- Rocky Mountain Athletic Conference – 1967–68 to 1971–72
- Great Plains Athletic Conference – 1972–73 to 1975–76
- North Central Conference – 1976–77 to 2007–08
- Mid-America Intercollegiate Athletics Association – 2008–09 to 2010–11
- NCAA Division I Independent – 2011–12
- Summit League – 2012–13 to Present

== Sponsored sports ==
| Men's sports | Women's sports |
|---|---|
| Baseball | Basketball |
| Basketball | Cross country |
| Golf | Golf |
| Ice hockey | Soccer |
| Soccer | Softball |
| Swimming & diving | Swimming & diving |
| Tennis | Tennis |
| | Track & field^{†} |
| | Volleyball |
† – Track and field includes both indoor and outdoor

Summit League logo in Omaha's colors

=== Ice hockey ===
The men's ice hockey program competes at the Division I level in the National Collegiate Hockey Conference (NCHC), which began play in the 2013–14 season following a major conference realignment in that sport. Before the formation of the NCHC, Omaha had been a member of the Western Collegiate Hockey Association. The men's ice hockey program reached the NCAA Division I Men's Ice Hockey Tournament in 2006, 2011, and 2015. During the 2015 tournament, the Mavericks made it to the 2015 Frozen Four, their first in school history. The Mavericks are currently coached by Mike Gabinet. Gabinet is the third coach in program history, following Mike Kemp and Dean Blais. The team moved into the new on-campus Baxter Arena for the 2015–16 season.

=== Men's basketball ===
The Omaha men's basketball team is led by head coach Chris Crutchfield, and also moved into Baxter Arena starting in 2015–16. They transitioned from Division II to Division I beginning in the 2011–12 season. The 2015–16 season was the first in which they became eligible for NCAA-sponsored postseason play (either the NCAA Tournament or the NIT). The Mavericks' all-time record is 1,087–1,083. Omaha won regular season North Central Conference championships in 1979, 1984, 2004, and 2005.

=== Wrestling ===
Wrestling has also been a top sport for the Mavericks, winning the Division II championships in 1991, 2004–2006 and 2009–2011. However, in 2011 Trev Alberts made the decision to disband the wrestling team only a few hours after it had won its third consecutive NCAA team title in order for Omaha to transition to NCAA Division I. Head coach Mike Denney and a number of his wrestlers later transferred to Maryville University to start a Division II team.

== Championships ==
=== NCAA team championships ===
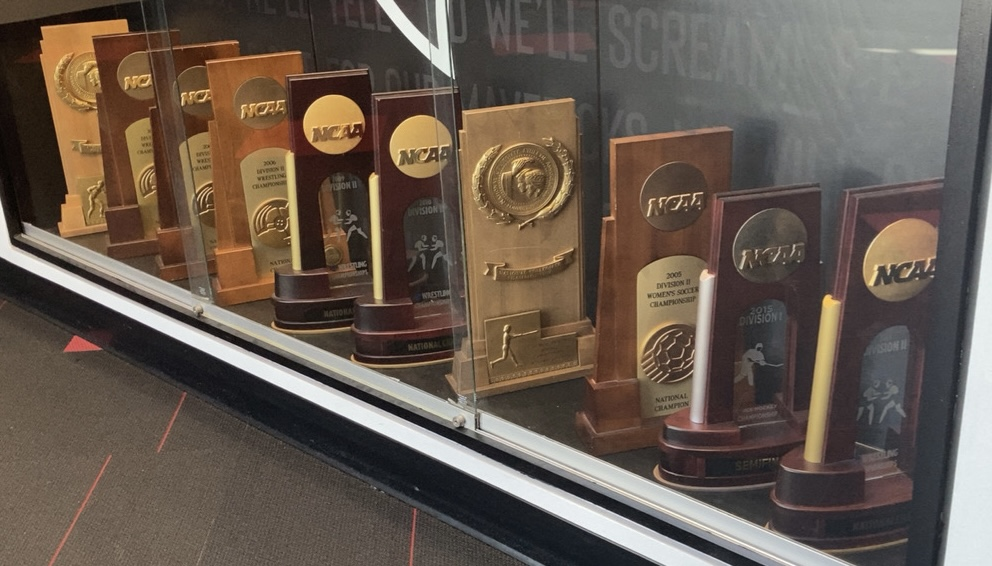
UNO's NCAA and AIAW national championship trophies

The Omaha Mavericks have won 10 NCAA Division II national championships, along with an AIAW softball national championship.

- Men's (7)
  - Wrestling (7): 1991, 2004, 2005, 2006, 2009, 2010, 2011
- Women's (3)
  - Soccer (1): 2005
  - Softball (1): 2001
  - Volleyball (1): 1996

=== Other national team championships ===
- Women's (3)
  - Dance (2): 2020, 2021 (UDA)
  - Softball (1): 1975 (AIAW)

=== Conference champions ===
Soccer, Men's – 2017, 2020, 2023
Soccer, Women's – 2000, 2001, 2002, 2004, 2005, 2006, 2022
Baseball – 1979, 1981, 2005, 2008*, 2013^{1}, 2014^{1}, 2019
Basketball, Men's – 1979, 1984, 2004, 2005, 2008*, 2010, 2025
Basketball, Women's – 1980, 1982
Football – 1983^{2}, 1984^{2}, 1996, 1998^{3}, 2000, 2004, 2005^{4}, 2006^{5} 2007*
Golf – 2002, 2003, 2006
Softball – 1981, 1985, 1994, 1995, 1996, 1997, 2000, 2001, 2005, 2008*, 2011, 2022, 2023, 2026
Swimming and Diving – 2005, 2008*
Tennis – 2005, 2006, 2007, 2008*
Track – 1979 (outdoor), 1981 (indoor)
Volleyball – 1983, 1984, 1985, 1986, 1987, 1996^{6}, 1997^{6}, 2000^{7}, 2023

* Final NCC Champions (only 7 competing teams in NCC in 2008)
^{1}Regular-season champion; not eligible for The Summit League tournament because of Division I transition
^{2}Co-champion with North Dakota State
^{3}Co-champion with Northern Colorado
^{4}4-way Co-champions with Minnesota-Duluth, North Dakota and South Dakota
^{5}Co-champion with North Dakota
^{6}Co-champion with Augustana
^{7}3-way Co-champion with Augustana and South Dakota State

== Previous mascots and team names ==
Before 1939, UNO teams were known as the Cardinals. From 1939 to 1971, the UNO teams were the Indians; the mascot at this time was a Native American named Ouampi. In The Native Peoples of North America: A History, the mascot is described as "so tacky by comparison that he made the Cleveland Indians' Chief Wahoo look like a real gentleman." The switch to "Mavericks", the current team name, occurred in the summer of 1971. A resolution, passed by an 18–7 vote of the student senate, a 27–0 vote of the university senate, and approved by the university president, called for UNO to "discontinue use of the name 'Indian' for its athletic teams, abolish "Ouampi" as a school mascot and end the misuse of the Native American culture at university activities, such as homecoming and Ma-ie Day.
