= Oral Roberts Golden Eagles =

Intercollegiate sports teams of Oral Roberts University

- University: Oral Roberts University
- Nickname: Golden Eagles
- NCAA: Division I
- Conference: Summit League
- Athletic director: Tim Johnson
- Location: Tulsa, Oklahoma
- Varsity teams: 16
- Basketball arena: Mabee Center
- Baseball stadium: Chapman Park
- Colors: Navy blue, Vegas gold, and white
- Mascot: Eli
- Website: oruathletics.com
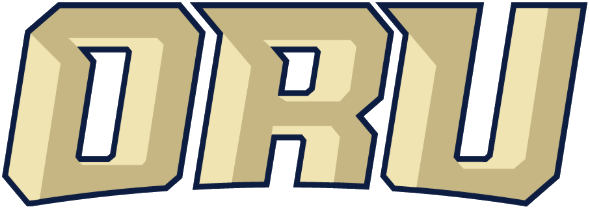

The Oral Roberts Golden Eagles are the sixteen intercollegiate athletic teams that represent Oral Roberts University, located in Tulsa, Oklahoma. The Golden Eagles compete at the National Collegiate Athletic Association (NCAA) Division I level as a member of the Summit League, which it officially joined on July 1, 2014.

== History ==
The Titans began competition as an independent team in 1965 and moved up to NCAA Division I in 1971. From 1979 to 1987, the Titans competed in the Midwestern Collegiate Conference. In 1989, the program transitioned to the NAIA before returning to NCAA Division I in 1991. The team joined the Mid-Continent Conference (now known as The Summit League) in 1997. In 2012, Oral Roberts University joined the Southland Conference, but in December 2013, it announced a return to The Summit League for all sports beginning in 2014. Notable alumnus Andretti Bain won a silver medal for The Bahamas in the 4 x 400 metres relay at the 2008 Summer Olympics.

== Sports sponsored ==
Men's sports	Women's sports
Baseball	Basketball
Basketball	Cross country
Cross country	Golf
Golf	Soccer
Soccer	Tennis
Tennis	Track and field^{†}
Track and field^{†}	Volleyball
† – Track and field includes both indoor and outdoor

A member of the Summit League, Oral Roberts University sponsors teams in eight men's and eight women's NCAA sanctioned sports:

=== Men's basketball ===
Summit League logo in Oral Roberts' colors

The men's basketball team reached the NCAA Elite Eight in the 1974 Tournament before losing to Kansas 90–93 in overtime, in what has been called "the most important basketball game ever played in Tulsa." Most recently, the men's basketball team went to the 2021 NCAA tournament as the #15 seed, advancing as a cinderella to the Sweet 16, losing to #3 seeded Arkansas, 70–72.

In the 2006–07 season, on November 15, 2006, the unranked Oral Roberts basketball team stunned the #3 team in the nation, the University of Kansas, at the Allen Fieldhouse in Lawrence, Kansas, 78–71. The team went on to win the Mid-Con conference championship on March 6, 2007, defeating #2 seeded Oakland, overcoming an 11-point halftime deficit to win 71–67.

In 2008, the Golden Eagles captured their third consecutive Summit League title, receiving a 13 seed in the South Region of the NCAA tournament. The Golden Eagles lost to 4th-seeded Pittsburgh, 63–82.

==== Overview of team achievement ====
- Overall Record of 907-641 (.586)
- Six NCAA Tournament appearances
- Eight NIT appearances
- 17 total postseason tournament appearances
- Six Summit League Regular Season Titles
- Four Summit League Tournament Titles
- Five Summit League Players of the Year
- Two Summit League Defensive Player of the Year
- Five Summit League Newcomers of the Year
- Three Summit League Sixth Men of the Year
- 2021 victories versus No. 2 Ohio State (72-75) and No. 7 Florida (78-81)
- 2009 victories over Stanford, Missouri and No. 13 New Mexico
- 2007 victory over Oklahoma State
- 2006 victory at No. 3 Kansas
- 1999 victory over Tulsa's Elite team
- 21 First Team All-Summit League selections
- Nine Second Team All-Summit League selections
- 15 Summit League All-Newcomer selections
- 14 Summit League All-Tournament selections
- Four Mid-Con Championship game appearances
- Three First Team All-Americans
- Two Second Team All-Americans
- Two Third Team All-Americans
- 12 Honorable Mention All-Americans

==== Coaching staff ====
The Golden Eagles are currently coached by Kory Barnett, who took over the program prior to the 2025-26 season. Barnett replaces Russell Springmann, who lead the program for two years, with losing records in each.

Coaching Career Records Coach Tenure Yrs. Record Pct.

- Bill White 1965–69 5 65–35 .650
- Ken Trickey 1969–74, 87–93 11 214–116 .648
- Jerry Hale 1974–77 3 61–21 .744
- Lake Kelly 1977–79 2 30–24 .556
- Ken Hayes 1979–83 4 50–43 .538
- Dick Acres 1982–85 3 47–34 .580
- Ted Owens 1985–87 2 21–35 .375
- Bill Self 1993–97 4 55–54 .505
- Barry Hinson 1997–99 2 36–23 .610
- Scott Sutton 1999–2017 18 328-247 .570
- Paul Mills 2017–pres

=== Baseball ===
The ORU baseball team has won the Mid-Con and Summit League tournament titles in 18 of the last 20 years, with the only exceptions being the 2013 and 2014 seasons in which ORU competed in the Southland Conference. In 2006, they advanced to the NCAA Super Regional. ORU continues to compete against regional rivals such as Arkansas, Oklahoma, Oklahoma State, Texas, and Wichita State, as well as dominating the Summit League.

==== Notable players ====
Mike Moore was an ORU standout from 1979–81 and first-round draft pick. He played 14 seasons in the big leagues and was selected an American League All-Star in 1989. He played in consecutive World Series with Oakland (1989–90), winning a World Championship in 1989. Todd Burns (1982–84) was Moore's teammate in Oakland and helped the A's win three straight American League pennants (1988–90) and 1989 World Series. Keith Lockhart (1985–86) played in the 1999 World Series as a member of the Atlanta Braves and helped that team win five consecutive National League Eastern Division titles. Tom Nieto (1981) played in the 1985 world Series with St. Louis Cardinals and won a World championship in 1987 as a member of the Minnesota Twins. Doug Bernier, Michael Hollimon and Steve Holm all made their Major League debuts in 2008. Alex "Chi Chi" Gonzalez was drafted in the 1st round (23rd overall) in 2013 and made it to the Rangers lineup for his MLB debut May 30, 2015. Jose Trevino (6th round, 2014) and Matt Whatley (3rd round, 2017) were also drafted by the Texas Rangers.

==== Notable coaches ====
Former head coach Larry Cochell guided ORU from 1977–86, leading the school to seven NCAA Regional appearances and the 1978 College World Series. Former coach Sunny Golloway was one of the winningest active skippers in the NCAA Division I, guiding the Golden Eagles to a 294–136 record and five NCAA Regional appearances in seven years at the helm. He was an assistant coach for Team USA in the summer of 2002.

As first year head coach in 2004, Rob Walton guided ORU to the nation's best winning percentage (.820) while also setting a Summit League mark with a 50–11 overall record. The 2004 Golden Eagles were ranked in the Top 20 for 12 consecutive weeks, reaching a high of No. 13 in late May...Walton led ORU to its ninth consecutive Summit League Tournament title and the program's 18th NCAA Regional appearance in 2006. Walton also earned ABCA Midwest Region Coach of the Year honors after guiding the Golden Eagles to a regional championship and final Top 25 ranking in all three major, a program first. Walton also served as the head coach for USA Baseball's National Team during the summer of 2008.

Since taking over for Walton in 2013, Ryan Folmar led ORU to a 132-93 record and three NCAA Tournament berths in his first five years. In 2017, the Golden Eagles were 43-16 (25-4 Summit League) and beat Oklahoma State in the second game of the Fayetteville Regional in the NCAA Tournament.

==== NCAA First-Team All-Americans Selections ====
- 1977 Bob Volk
- 1978 Bill Springman
- 1981 Mike Moore
- 1981 Tom Nieto
- 1982 Keith Mucha
- 1984 Todd Burns
- 1991 Robert Collins
- 1999 Jeff Stallings
- 2004 Dennis Bigley
- 2008 Brian Van Kirk

=== Women's basketball ===
Having 4 conference championships under their belt in the 8 years since joining the Mid-Continent Conference (now The Summit League), the team has a solid reputation among fellow mid-major programs. Head coach Jerry Finkbeiner was hired in July 1996 and has delivered all four of the school's NCAA Women's Division I Basketball Championship appearances.

- Overall record of 219–172 (.5607)
- Five NCAA tournament appearances
- One WNIT appearance
- One Summit League regular season title
- Five Summit League tournament titles
- Two Preseason WNIT appearances
- Five Summit League Players of the Year
- Five Summit League Newcomers of the Year
- Five Summit League Defensive Player of the year
- 11 first team All-Summit League selections
- Eight Second Team All-Summit League selections
- 10 Summit League All-Newcomer Team selections
- Six Summit League Tournament MVPs
- Seven Summit League Championship game appearances
- Two Honorable Mention All-American
- One Freshman All-American

=== Women's soccer ===
The women's soccer team advanced to the NCAA Tournament in 2004.

- Overall record of 134–99–17 (.570)
- One NCAA Tournament appearance
- Two Summit League Regular Tournament titles
- Three Summit League Players of the Year
- 30 First Team All- Summit League selections
- 20 Second Team All-Summit League selections
- 22 Summit League All-Tournament selections
- Two Summit League Tournament MVPs
- Six Summit League Championship game appearances

Memorable Players: Nicole Bucelluni, Tayah Schroter-Gillespie, Lindsay Ruisch, Michelle Hoogveld, Kellie Fenton

=== Men's soccer ===
- One NCAA Play-in appearance
- One Summit League Tournament Title
- Three Summit League players of the year
- Three Summit League Newcomers of the Year
- 25 First Team All-Summit League selections
- 25 Second Team All-Summit League selections
- 16 Summit League All-Tournament selections
- One Summit League Tournament MVP

=== Women's golf ===
- 13 Summit League titles (consecutive)
- NCAA's Longest Active Consecutive Conference Championships Streak
- 10 NCAA Tournament appearances
- One individual NCAA Championships qualifier
- 10 Summit League Players of the Year
- Nine Summit League Newcomers of the Year
- 42 First Team All-Summit League selections
- 16 Second Team All-Summit League selections

=== Men's golf ===
- Six NCAA Championship appearances
  - Best finish: Second in 1981 to BYU
- 14 conference championships
  - Horizon League (6): 1980–1983, 1984 (fall), 1985
  - Summit League (8): 1998–2001, 2003, 2009, 2010, 2025
- Six Summit League Players of the Year
- Eight Summit League Newcomers of the Year
- Three NCAA qualifiers
- 17 First Team All-Summit League selections
- 13 Second Team All-Summit League selections
- PGA Tour winners: Dave Barr (two wins), Bill Glasson (seven wins)
- Paul Friedlander, a Swazi golfer, played for the team and became a professional golfer

=== Men's and women's cross country ===
- Five Women's NCAA Regional appearances
- Two Summit League Men's Runner of the Year
- Four Summit League Women's runner of the Year
- One Summit League Women's Newcomer of the Year
- Ben Houltberg, 2000 Mid-Con Student-Athlete of the year
- Faithy Kamangila, 2004 Cross Country All-American
- Nine Men's First Team All-Summit League selections
- Six Men's Second Team All-Summit League selections
- 16 Women's First Team All-Summit League selections
- Eight Women's Second Team All-Summit League selections

=== Men's indoor track & field ===
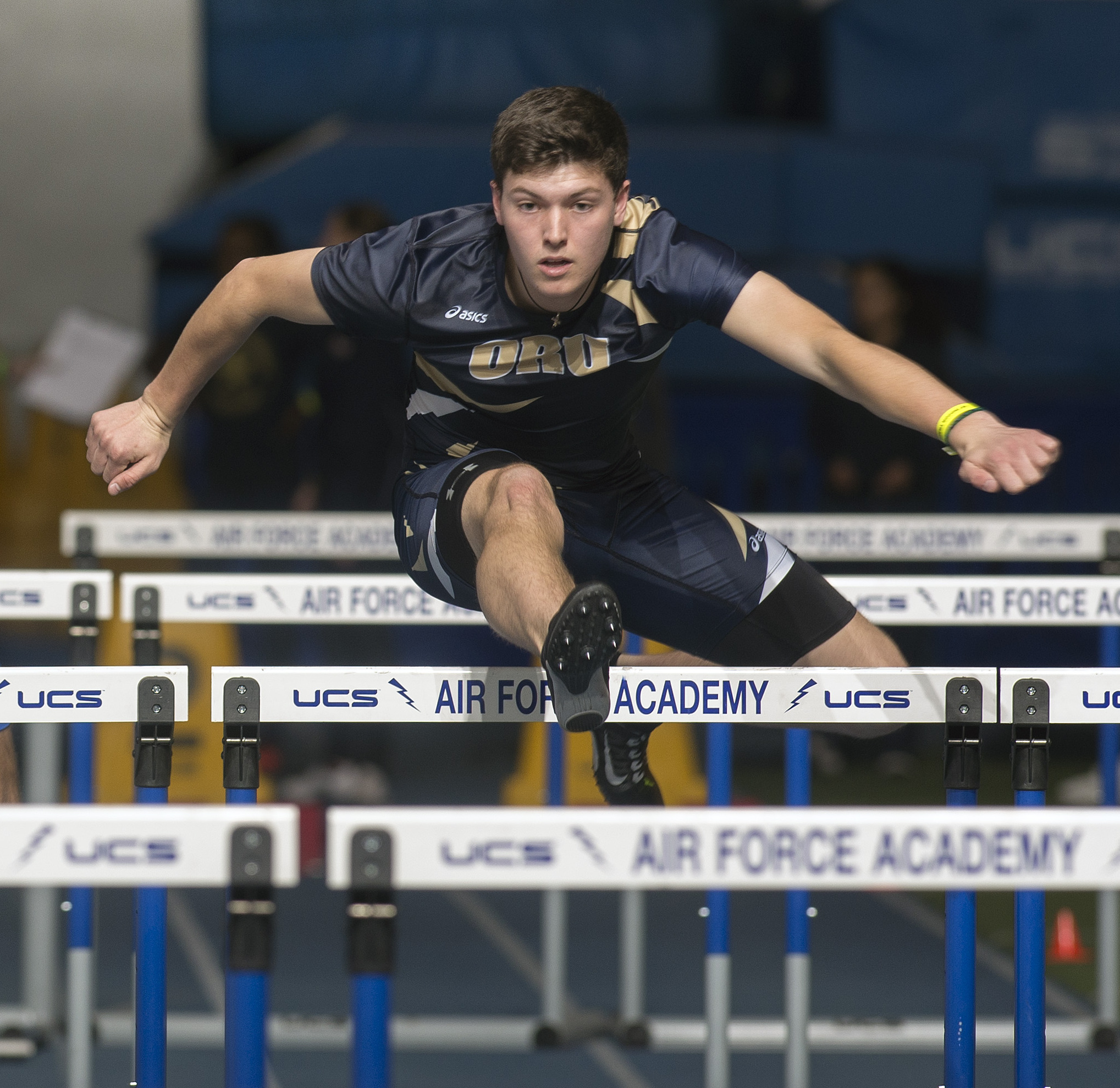
A Golden Eagles men's hurdler in 2017

- One individual Nation Champion
- Seven Summit League Championships
- 20 NCAA Qualifiers
- Nine All-Americans
- Eight Summit League Newcomers of the Year
- Eight Summit League Athletes of the Year
- 149 All Summit selections
- Seven All-Summit Championship Event-Records

=== Men's outdoor track & field ===
- Two individual National Champions
- Six All-Americans
- One Summit League Championship
- 40 NCAA qualifiers
- One Summit League Athlete of the Year
- Two Summit League Newcomer of the Year
- 2006 4x800 Relay Team Ranked #1 in the World
- Ranked #10 nationally in 2002 with a 3.03 GPA
- 122 All-Summit League selections
- Four Summit League Championship event-records

=== Women's indoor track & field ===
- Two Summit League Championships
- 40 NCAA Qualifiers
- Seven All-Americans
- Ranked #1 nationally in 2001 & 2002 in team G.P.A.
- 115 All-Summit League selections
- 13 Summite League Championship event-records
- Six Athletes of the Year
- Three Newcomer of the Year

=== Women's tennis ===
- Seven NCAA appearances
- Seven Summit League Regular Season titles
- Eight Summit League Tournament + Championships
- Five Summit League Players of the Year
- Three Summit League Newcomers of the Year
- 33 All-Summit League selections

=== Men's tennis ===
- Eight NCAA Tournament appearances
- Seven Summit League Regular Season titles
- Nine Summit League Tournament Championships
- Five Summit League Players of the Year
- Three Summit League Newcomer of the Year
- 36 All-Summit League selections

=== Volleyball ===
- Overall record of 259–135 (.657)
- Seven Summit League Player of the Year
- Three Summit League Newcomers of the Year
- Six Summit League Setters of the Year
- Three Summit League Defensive Players of the Year
- Seven Summit League Regular Season titles
- Seven Summit League Tournament titles
- Seven NCAA Tournament appearances
- 1997 NCAA Tournament win over #10 Arizona
- Seven Summit League Tournament MVPs
- 26 First Team All-Summit League selections
- 18 Second Team All-Summit League selections
- 155–31 overall record in Summit League Regular Season play
- Julianna Moser, 1999 and 2000 Summit League Female Student-Athlete of the Year

== Mascot ==
ORU's athletic teams for both men and women are known as the Golden Eagles, a change which became effective on April 30, 1993.

Originally, ORU's nicknames were the Titans for men and the Lady Titans for women. These monikers were adopted in 1965 by a vote of the student body, many of whom were from the East Coast or were either casual or serious New York Titans (now known as Jets) football fans.

The nicknames endured until 1993, when a search for a new nickname was concluded with the selection of the Golden Eagles. ORU's new mascot, "Eli" the Golden Eagle, hatched out of his papier-mache egg on November 17, 1993, before the start of an exhibition basketball game. With this unveiling, the Golden Eagle nickname became the official symbol of a new era in ORU athletics.

== Venues ==
The Golden Eagles basketball teams play at the Mabee Center. The baseball team plays at J. L. Johnson Stadium. The volleyball team plays at Cooper Aerobics Center. The soccer teams play at the ORU Soccer Complex. The golf teams play at Indian Springs Country Club.

=== Mabee Center ===
The Mabee Center, an outstanding collegiate arena, has been home to the Golden Eagles since 1972. Mabee Center was built as an elliptical cable-suspension structure with basketball in mind. The arena has 10,575 permanent theater seats – with no obstacles to clear viewing. The quality viewing and playing areas have drawn nine different national tournaments since the building opened. The Golden Eagles played in the first NCAA tournament held here in 1974. Four other NCAA regionals (1975, 1978, 1982 and 1985) have been based at the Mabee Center. The National Invitation Tournament picked ORU as host four times (1977, 1980, 1982 and 1983).

=== J. L. Johnson Stadium ===
J. L. Johnson Stadium has been the home of Golden Eagles baseball since 1978. It hosted its first game on March 6, 1978.

In 2008, a 20,000-square-foot (1,900 m^{2}) facility was added which includes coaches offices, a state-of-the-art weight room and the Grand Slam Room in which boosters and fans can watch ORU games in a climate-controlled environment. The facility is located down the right-field line.

Johnson Stadium has been host to three NCAA Regionals (1978,1980,1981), 14 conference tournaments, and many All-Americans. Many Major Leaguers have played at Johnson Stadium, including Roger Clemens, Joe Carter, Kirk Gibson, Tony Gwynn, Keith Lockhart, Pete Incaviglia, Kevin McReynolds, Mike Moore, and Robin Ventura.

=== H. A. Chapman Indoor Practice Facility ===
The H. A. Chapman Indoor Practice Facility opened in the Fall of 2009. The 35,000-square-foot (3,300 m^{2}) facility, located just west of J. L. Johnson Stadium, features indoor practices areas for both baseball and track & field programs. Built at a cost of $1.2 million, the facility was funded exclusively through private donations, including a generous lead gift from the H. A. and Mary K. Chapman Charitable Trust. The baseball portion of the facility features a regulation-sized infield, three pitching areas and three netted batting cages. The track & field area features a complete pole vault area, high jump pit and long jump & triple jump practice areas.
