= South Dakota Coyotes =

- University: University of South Dakota
- NCAA: Division I (FCS)
- Conference: Summit League (primary); Missouri Valley Football Conference
- Athletic director: Jon Schemmel
- Location: Vermillion, South Dakota
- Varsity teams: 18 (7 men's, 11 women's)
- Football stadium: DakotaDome
- Basketball arena: Sanford Coyote Sports Center
- Nickname: Coyotes
- Colors: Red and white
- Mascot: Charlie Coyote
- Fight song: Hail, South Dakota!
- Website: goyotes.com

The South Dakota Coyotes, also known as the USD Coyotes (locally /ˈkaɪoʊts/ KY-ohts), are the athletic teams for the University of South Dakota. Their team colors are vermilion and white. They have been members of Summit League of the NCAA's Division I since the 2011–12 school year. The football team plays in Division I's Football Championship Subdivision as a member of the Missouri Valley Football Conference. The Coyotes were charter members of the Division II North Central Conference and were members until 2008 when it upgraded to Division I.

Before the 2016–17 school year, most of the Coyotes' athletic events were held in the multi-purpose DakotaDome, located in Vermillion, South Dakota. Football and basketball were the main events for the venue, followed by volleyball, indoor track, and swimming. The basketball and volleyball teams moved to the new Sanford Coyote Sports Center upon its opening in August 2016; the other aforementioned sports remain at the DakotaDome.

== Sports sponsored ==
Men's sports	Women's sports
Basketball	Basketball
Cross Country	Cross Country
Football	Golf
Golf	Soccer
Swimming and Diving	Softball
Track and Field^{1}	Swimming and Diving
	Tennis
	Track and Field^{1}
	Triathlon
	Volleyball
^{1} – Track and field includes both indoor and outdoor

A primary member of the Summit League, the University of South Dakota sponsors teams in seven men's and ten women's NCAA sanctioned sports. The football program competes in the Missouri Valley Football Conference.

The Coyote softball team appeared in one Women's College World Series in 1971.

The Coyote women's basketball team made its first NCAA Division 1 Tournament appearance in 2014.

The Coyote women's basketball team won the WNIT Championship over Florida Gulf Coast in 2016.

The Coyote Volleyball team made its first NCAA Division 1 Tournament Appearance in 2018.

== National championships ==
=== Team ===
Sport	Association	Division	Year	Opponent/Runner-up	Score
Men's cross country (1)	NCAA	Division II	1997	Central Missouri State	78–83 (-5)
