= South Dakota State Jackrabbits =

- University: South Dakota State University
- Nickname: Jackrabbits
- NCAA: Division I (FCS)
- Conference: Summit League (primary); Missouri Valley Football Conference; Pac-12 Conference (wrestling); ECAC (equestrian)
- Athletic director: Justin Sell
- Location: Brookings, South Dakota
- Varsity teams: 19
- Football stadium: Dana J. Dykhouse Stadium
- Basketball arena: First Bank and Trust Arena
- Baseball stadium: Erv Huether Field
- Colors: Blue and yellow
- Mascot: Jack Rabbit
- Fight song: Ring the Bell
- Website: gojacks.com

The South Dakota State Jackrabbits are the 19 intercollegiate teams representing South Dakota State University that compete in the U.S. National Collegiate Athletic Association's Division I (for football: Football Championship Subdivision). South Dakota State is currently a member of the Summit League, the Missouri Valley Football Conference, the Big 12 Conference and Varsity Equestrian. The university won numerous conference championships and several national titles including the NCAA College Division national title in men's basketball in 1963 and the NCAA Division II national title in women's basketball in 2003.

== History ==
In recent years, the South Dakota State football team has become a perennial FCS power. The Jackrabbits won the Missouri Valley Football Conference championship in 2016, 2020, 2022, and 2023, and have made twelve consecutive FCS playoff appearances (13 overall). They have reached the FCS semifinals six times in that time span, were national runners-up in 2020, and won their first national championship on January 8, 2023, by beating their rivals, the North Dakota State Bison, 45–21. The Jackrabbits repeated as national champions on January 7, 2024 by defeating the Montana Grizzlies 23–3 and finishing a perfect 15–0. South Dakota State outscored their four 2024 playoff opponents 146–15. The football team is currently a 29-game winning streak, third-longest in FCS football history.

The 2011–2012 season marked the fifth-consecutive trip to the NCAA Tournament for the Jackrabbit women's basketball team, capping a season in which the Jackrabbits won the regular-season Summit League title and their fifth consecutive Summit League Tournament title. In 2019 the Jackrabbit women’s basketball advanced to their first appearance in the NCAA tournament Sweet Sixteen. They were also the 2022 WNIT tournament champions, defeating Seton Hall 82–50.

The Jackrabbit men’s basketball team qualified for its first NCAA Tournament in the 2012–13 season following a second-place regular season finish in the Summit League and winning the Summit League Tournament title. In 2022 the Men’s basketball team broke the Summit League and school record with 30 wins and also became the first school to run the table in conference play at 18–0. They then qualified for their 6th NCAA tournament, going a full 21–0 against conference foes. They ended their season at 30–5 (18–0).

The Jackrabbit baseball team qualified for the 2013 NCAA Tournament and traveled to Eugene, Oregon, losing the first game to eventual regional champion Oregon and then being eliminated by the University of San Francisco in a 13-inning defensive battle.

In 2018, the school had its first Division I champion wrestler with Seth Gross.

== Sports sponsored ==
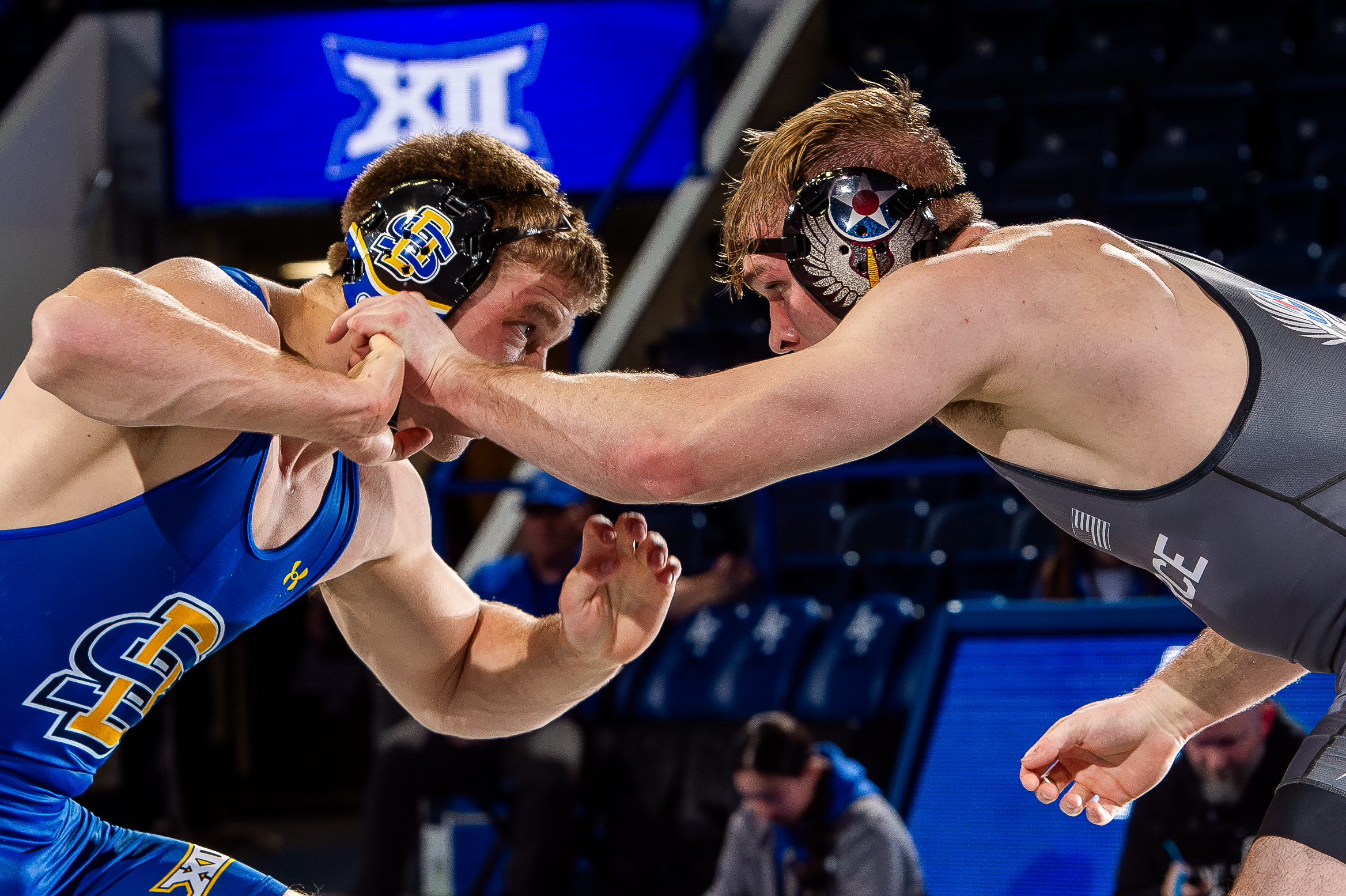
A Jackrabbits wrestler (left) faces off against an Air Force opponent during a match in 2025

Men's sports	Women's sports
Baseball	Basketball
Basketball	Cross country
Cross country	Equestrian
Football	Golf
Golf	Soccer
Swimming and diving	Softball
Track and field^{†}	Swimming and diving
Wrestling	Track and field^{†}
	Volleyball
† – Track and field includes both indoor and outdoor

=== Men's basketball ===
The Jackrabbits were NCAA Division II national champions in 1963; they have since joined the ranks of Division I.

=== Women's basketball ===
Head coach Aaron Johnston took over the program in 2000. After becoming the first school transitioning to Division I to earn a postseason bid, playing in the WNIT in both 2007 and 2008, SDSU turned its focus to dominating the Summit League. The Jacks have won nine of the 13 conference tournaments they have played in. The program has played in ten NCAA Division I Tournaments, winning four games, highlighted by a trip to the Sweet Sixteen in 2019. The program also won first-round games in 2009 and 2015.

=== Men's football ===
As of January 7, 2024, the Jackrabbits have appeared in the NCAA Division I FCS playoffs 14 times with an overall record of 22–11. They were in the Championship game May 20, 2021, losing 23–21 to Sam Houston State. The Jackrabbits were semifinalists in 2017, 2018, and 2021. SDSU has an active streak of 12 consecutive postseason appearances at the FCS level, including the appearance in 2024. Through 2022, this was accomplished by John Stiegelmeier, the school's winningest head coach, after the program managed only one Division II playoff appearance (1979). Beginning in 2023, Jimmy Rogers became the head coach. Zach Zenner became the first Division I football player to record three consecutive seasons of 2,000 rushing yards (2012–14). The program's national standing persuaded ESPN's College Gameday television show to come to the Brookings campus for a live broadcast of its show on October 26, 2019. The Jackrabbits won their first FCS National Championship following the 2022 season and won their second following the 2023 season on January 7, 2024.

== Athletic facilities ==
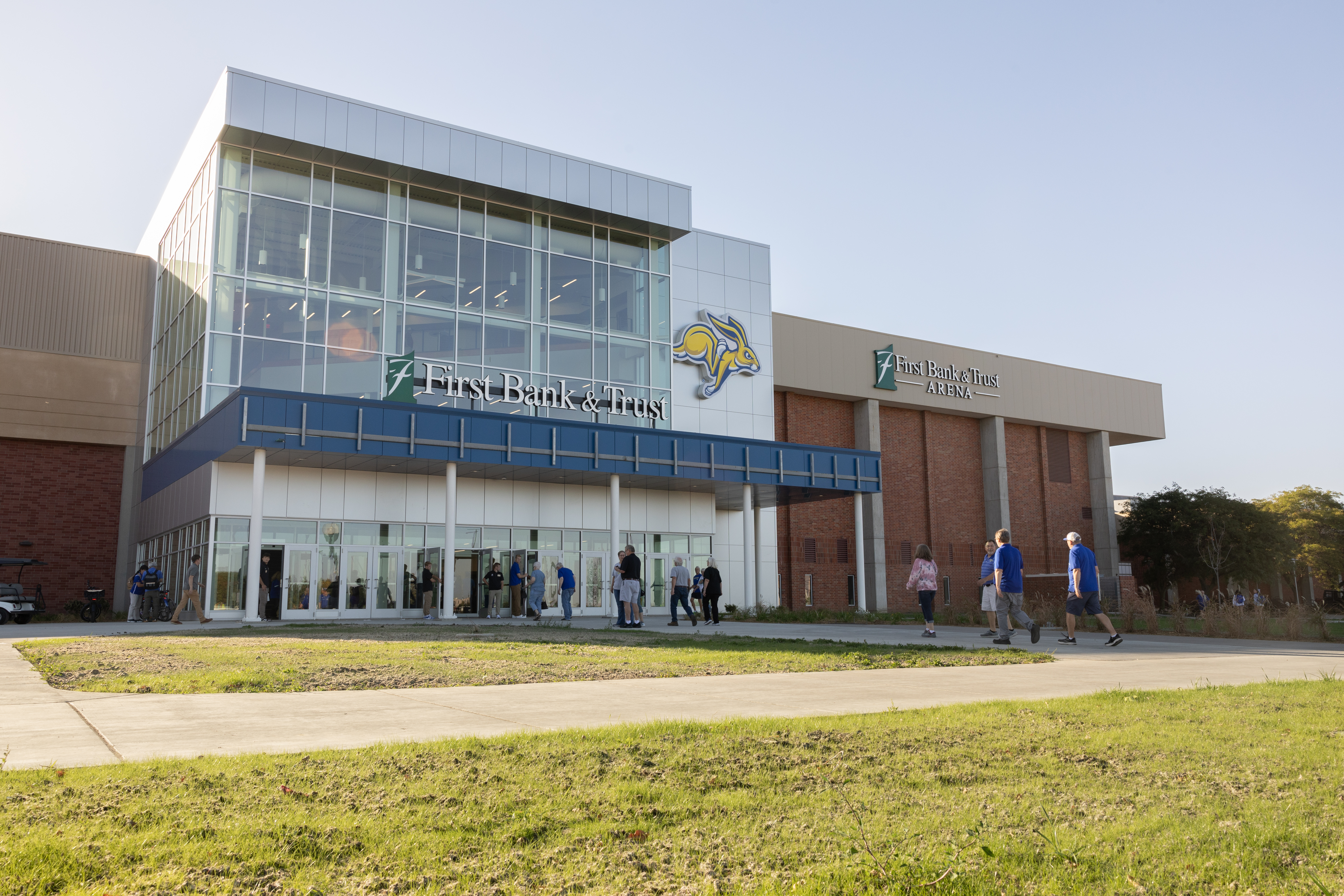
First Bank & Trust Arena, which opened in the fall of 2024, is the home venue for Jackrabbit basketball, volleyball and wrestling

South Dakota State has some of the best athletic facilities in their region, The Summit League, and the Missouri Valley Football Conference. Some of the university's venues compete as some of the finest in the nation (Sanford Jackrabbit Athlete Complex and the Dana J. Dykhouse Stadium).

- Frost Arena is the 6,500 seat on campus facility that houses men's and women's basketball, and women's volleyball teams. Frost Arena is currently on the master plan to add more modern concessions, restrooms and seating, as well as several building additions which include a wrestling practice facility, and a multi court arena that would double for basketball and volleyball practices as well as a competition venue for wrestling and volleyball.
- Erv Huether Field is home of the Jackrabbit baseball team. Seats 600 spectators.
- Dana J. Dykhouse Stadium, the on-campus football stadium with a capacity for 19,340 fans, opened for the 2016 season.
- Fishback Soccer park. seats 1500 spectators. Also on the master athletic plans are an on campus soccer stadium and practice fields.
- 2025 master plan calls for an aquatics competition and practice facility.
- Dykhouse Student Athlete Center. Located in the north end zone of Dana J. Dykhouse Stadium. Houses football staff, sports medicine and athletic training.
- Sanford Jackrabbit Athletic Complex, Connected to the north side of the Dykhouse Athlete Center. it boasts 149,284-square feet of practice space and one of five 300-meter tracks in NCAA Division 1.
- Stanley J. Marshall HPER Center Pool. The six-lane competition pool is 25 yards long. A diving well allows for 1- and 3-meter competitions.

The Dykhouse Student Athlete Center, the home of Jackrabbit football, opened prior to the 2010 football season. The Sanford Jackrabbit Athlete Complex, a state-of-the-art indoor practice and competition facility opened October 11, 2014. It is immediately north of and attached to the Dykhouse Student Athlete Center. The SJAC has bleacher seating for up to 1,000 spectators and can be used for track practice and track meets, football practice, softball and baseball practice, and other events within the SDSU athletic department. It has been recently furbished with a state-of-the-art indoor golf practice area consisting of 4500 square feet of practice space, with slope, sand traps and simulators for rainy weather and the winter months. When completed, the 149,284-square foot facility was the largest indoor practice facility in Division I athletics and features an eight-lane, 300-meter track, one of only five collegiate indoor tracks of that size in the nation. Inside the track is an 80-yard football field plus end zones at each end. The turf in the facility is soy-based Astroturf. The SJAC has areas for sports medicine including rehab space, a training room, additional weight-training facilities, hydrotherapy, a football team room, offices and academic advising facilities. The Dykhouse Student Athlete Center is immediately north of the new stadium for Jackrabbit football, the 19,340-capacity Dana J. Dykhouse Stadium, opened in the Fall of 2016. The Dykhouse Stadium was constructed for easy expansion to 22,500 and the potential for future expansion to a capacity of 40,000. Like the SJAC, the turf in the Stadium is soy-based Astroturf.

In November 2018, SDSU finished construction on a new practice facility connected to Frost Arena that contains 2 full-size practice courts for men's and women's basketball and women's volleyball.

The Frank J. Kurtenbach Family Wrestling Center opened in Fall 2022. The 16,000 sq. ft. building is on the southwest corner of the SJAC and provides practice area and locker rooms.

Frost Arena is currently undergoing a $50 million renovation that will change the name to First Bank & Trust Arena. First Bank & Trust committed the lead gift of $20 million. The arena renovation will include premium seating areas & suites, state-of-the-art video board and display systems, an enhanced sound system, a more spacious concourse, and improved restrooms. New and improved locker rooms and offices are also a part of the design for the renovated arena, which will have an estimated capacity of 5,500.

Fundraising has started for a new on-campus soccer stadium across from Dana J. Dykhouse Stadium & Artificial Turf for the Erv Huether Field & The Jackrabbit Softball Stadium.

== National championships ==
=== Team ===
Sport	Association	Division	Year	Opponent/Runner-up	Score
Men's basketball (1)	NCAA	College	1963	Wittenberg	44–42
Women's basketball (1)	NCAA	Division II	2003	Northern Kentucky	65–50
Men's cross country (6)	NAIA (1)	Single	1956	Kansas State Teachers Hays	71–68
Men's cross country (6)	NCAA (5)	College (1)	1959	Kansas State Teachers	67–75
Men's cross country (6)	NCAA (5)	Division II (4)	1973	Southwest Missouri State	88–93
Men's cross country (6)	NCAA (5)	Division II (4)	1985	Edinboro	60–108
Men's cross country (6)	NCAA (5)	Division II (4)	1989	Edinboro	97–102
Men's cross country (6)	NCAA (5)	Division II (4)	1996	Lewis	119–142
Women's cross country (1)	NCAA	Division II	1981	Cal Poly San Luis Obispo	26–49
Football (2)	NCAA	NCAA Division I FCS	2022	North Dakota State	45–21
Football (2)	NCAA	NCAA Division I FCS	2023	Montana	23–3
Men's outdoor track and field (1)	NAIA	Single	1953	Abilene Christian	48–42 (+6)

=== Individual ===
Name	Sport	Association	Division	Year	Opponent/Runner-up	School	Score
Seth Gross	Wrestling, 133 lbs.	NCAA	Division I	2018	Stevan Mićić	Michigan	13–8

== Notable alumni ==
- Cleveland L. Abbott — American football coach
- Colin Cochart — American football player
- Rod DeHaven — Olympic marathoner
- Doug Eggers — American football player
- Steve Heiden — American football player
- Jim Langer — American football player
- Jon Madsen — wrestler; professional MMA fighter
- Paul Miller — American football player
- Josh Ranek — Canadian football player
- Wayne Rasmussen — American football player
- Pete Retzlaff — American football player, executive
- Caleb Thielbar — baseball player
- Adam Timmerman — American football player
- Blake Treinen — baseball player
- Adam Vinatieri — American football player
- Danny Batten — American football player
- Nate Wolters — basketball player
- Zach Zenner — American football player
- Dallas Goedert — American football player
- Dick Beardsley — American marathon runner
- Denilson Cyprianos — Olympic Swimmer
- Tucker Kraft — American football player
