= 2026 Chicago Stars FC season =

Chicago Stars FC 2026 soccer season

Chicago Stars FC
2026 season
- Majority owner: Laura Ricketts
- General manager: Richard Feuz (until May 27); Vacant (after May 27)
- Head coach: Martin Sjögren (until Aug 12); Karina Báez (interim, after Aug 12)
- Stadium: Martin Stadium (capacity: 12,023)
- NWSL: 16th of 16
- Playoffs: Did not qualify
- Top goalscorer: Jordyn Huitema (4)
- Highest home attendance: 6,678 (vs LA, Jul 18)
- Lowest home attendance: 1,821 (vs ORL, Mar 25)
- Average home league attendance: 4,552
- Biggest win: 2–0 (vs BOS (H), NWSL, Apr 25)
- Biggest defeat: 0–6 (vs NC (H), NWSL, Sep 6)
Home colors	Away colors
- All statistics correct as of November 1, 2026.

The 2026 Chicago Stars FC season was the team's eighteenth as a professional women's soccer team, and thirteenth in the National Women's Soccer League (NWSL), the top tier of women's soccer in the United States. Stars FC is based in Evanston, Illinois, having moved there from their prior home in Bridgeview, Illinois.

== Background ==
In 2025, Chicago started off the year with a string of poor performances that culminated with the firing of head coach Lorne Donaldson. Masaki Hemmi and Ella Masar went on to spend stints as interim head coach throughout the season before both individuals moved on. In August 2025, the Stars announced the signing of Martin Sjögren as new head coach, effective at the start of the 2026 season. After being eliminated from playoff contention in late September, the Stars went on to finish the season at the bottom of the NWSL table.

=== Kit changes ===
On February 26, 2026, the Stars unveiled its new primary uniform, the 'DNA Kit,' featuring a design paying tribute to Chicago's history in skyscrapers and general architecture. Featuring a color scheme of red, white, and blue, the new jersey also pays homage to multiple landmarks around Chicago.

== Stadium and facilities ==
After a ten-season stint at SeatGeek Stadium in Bridgeview, Illinois, 2026 is the Stars' first season playing at the lakefront Martin Stadium on the campus of Northwestern University. Chicago had already previously played a match at Martin Stadium in 2025, a 5–2 victory over the Orlando Pride that set a second-highest season attendance marker for the Stars.

== Team ==
=== Current squad ===
As of August 9, 2026.

No.	Pos.	Player	Nation
1	GK	USA	Alyssa Naeher (captain)
3	DF	USA	Sam Staab
4	FW	USA	Jenna Bike
5	DF	NGR	Michelle Alozie
7	MF	CAN	Julia Grosso
8	FW	USA	Jameese Joseph
9	FW	USA	Mallory Swanson
10	MF	USA	Brianna Pinto
11	FW	POR	Nádia Gomes
12	DF	FIN	Natalia Kuikka (SEI)
14	DF	USA	Taylor Wood
15	DF	USA	Elise Evans
16	MF	JPN	Manaka Hayashi
18	FW	COL	Ivonne Chacón
20	MF	USA	Bea Franklin
22	GK	USA	Halle Mackiewicz
23	FW	USA	Micayla Johnson
24	FW	USA	Ryan Connaughton
25	DF	MEX	Aaliyah Farmer
27	GK	USA	Katie Atkinson
28	MF	USA	Emma Egizii
29	DF	ESP	Leila Ouahabi
31	MF	GER	Anna Gasper
34	MF	USA	Tessa Dellarose
77	MF	ESP	Maitane López
99	FW	CAN	Jordyn Huitema (SEI)

==== Out on loan ====
No.	Pos.	Player	Nation
2	DF	USA	Sam Angel (at DC Power FC through December 31, 2026)
19	GK	USA	Mackenzie Wood (at Portland Thorns FC through December 31, 2026)

=== Coaching staff ===
The Stars fired the club's general manager Richard Feuz on May 27, dividing his responsibilities between assistant general manager Beatrice Caliani and president Karen Leetzow. The Stars fired the club's head coach Martin Sjögren and assistant coach Anders Jacobson on August 12, and assigned assistant coach Karina Báez as interim coach, re-hired former coach Lorne Donaldson as interim director of coaching, and hired former Spokane Zephyr FC head coach Nicole Lukic as assistant coach.

On September 17. 2026, the Stars announced the hiring of Vlatko Andonovski, previously the sporting director of Kansas City Current and a former United States women's national soccer team head coach, as the club's chief soccer officer.

As of September 13, 2026.

Coaching staff
Interim head coach	(Mexico) Karina Báez
Assistant coach	(United States) Nicole Lukic
Assistant coach	(Wales) David Gough
Goalkeeper coach	(England) Daniel Ball
Interim director of coaching	(Jamaica) Lorne Donaldson

== Competitions ==
=== Regular season ===
==== Regular season standings ====
Pos	Team	Pld	W	D	L	GF	GA	GD	Pts
12	Houston Dash	30	9	6	15	38	44	−6	33
13	Boston Legacy FC	30	9	6	15	41	53	−12	33
14	Bay FC	30	7	6	17	30	47	−17	27
15	Racing Louisville FC	30	7	3	20	38	62	−24	24
16	Chicago Stars FC	30	5	2	23	17	71	−54	17

Source: NWSL
Rules for classification: 1) points; 2) total goal difference; 3) total wins; 4) total goals scored; 5) head-to-head points; 6) head-to-head goal goals scored; 7) fewest disciplinary points; 8) coin toss (if 2 clubs tied) or drawing of lots (if ≥3 clubs tied).

==== Results summary ====
Overall								Home						Away					
Pld	W	D	L	GF	GA	GD	Pts	W	D	L	GF	GA	GD	W	D	L	GF	GA	GD
30	5	2	23	17	71	−54	17	4	1	10	12	34	−22	1	1	13	5	37	−32

Last updated: November 1, 2026.
Source: NWSLsoccer.com

==== Results by matchday ====
Matchday	1	2	3	4	5	6	7	8	9	10	11	12	13	14	15	16	17	18	19	20	21	22	23	24	25	26	27	28	29	30
Ground	A	H	H	A	A	H	H	H	A	A	A	H	H	A	H	A	A	H	A	A	H	A	H	A	H	A	H	H	H	A
Result	L	W	L	L	L	W	L	L	L	L	W	L	W	L	L	L	L	D	L	L	W	L	L	D	L	L	L	L	L	L
Position	16	10	12	14	14	14	14	14	15	16	15	15	14	15	15	15	16	16	16	16	16	16	16	16	16	16	16	16	16	16

Updated to match(es) played on November 1, 2026. Source: NWSLsoccer.com
A = Away; H = Home; W = Win; D = Draw; L = Loss; P = Postponed; = NWSL Shield; = NWSL Playoffs

==== Matches ====
Win Draw Loss

March 15, 2026 1	Angel City FC	4–0	Chicago Stars FC	Los Angeles, California
6:00 pm	Fuller 33'; Shores 53'; Borges 66'; Maiara 70'	Report	Franklin (yellow card) 39'	Stadium: BMO Stadium; Attendance: 16,813; Referee: Shawn Tehini

March 22, 2026 2	Chicago Stars FC	2–1	Kansas City Current	Evanston, Illinois
1:00 pm	Dellarose 42'; Huitema 50'	Report	Bravo-Young (yellow card) 26'; Hopkins 57'	Stadium: Martin Stadium; Attendance: 4,192; Referee: Alex Billeter

March 25, 2026 3	Chicago Stars FC	0–3	Orlando Pride	Evanston, Illinois
7:00 pm	Joseph (yellow card) 45+7'; Pinto (yellow card) 73'	Report	Banda 13'; Ovalle 22'; Anderson 35'	Stadium: Martin Stadium; Attendance: 1,821; Referee: Matthew Thompson

March 28, 2026 4	San Diego Wave FC	2–0	Chicago Stars FC	San Diego, California
7:45 pm	Godfrey 56'; Barcenas 72'	Report	Pinto (yellow card) 53'	Stadium: Snapdragon Stadium; Attendance: 12,810; Referee: Servando Berna Rico

April 3, 2026 5	Utah Royals	1–0	Chicago Stars FC	Sandy, Utah
8:00 pm	Tanaka 74' (pen.)	Report		Stadium: America First Field; Attendance: 10,012; Referee: Trevor Wiseman

April 25, 2026 5	Chicago Stars FC	2–0	Boston Legacy FC	Evanston, Illinois
6:30 p.m. EDT (UTC-4)	Huitema 10'; Farmer (yellow card) 27'; Grosso (yellow card) 33'; Gomes 51'	Report	Prince (yellow card) 40'; Traoré (yellow card) 78'	Stadium: Martin Stadium; Attendance: 4,579; Referee: Calin Radosav

April 29, 2026 7	Chicago Stars FC	0–2	Gotham FC	Evanston, Illinois
7:00 pm		Report	Dudley 1', (yellow card) 22'; Lavelle 10'	Stadium: Martin Stadium; Attendance: 2,607; Referee: Marie Durr

May 3, 2026 8	Chicago Stars FC	0–2	Portland Thorns FC	Evanston, Illinois
12:00 pm		Report	Moultrie 17'; Turner 89'	Stadium: Martin Stadium; Attendance: 4,344; Referee: Brad Jensen

May 10, 2026 9	Kansas City Current	3–0	Chicago Stars FC	Kansas City, Missouri
11:30 am	Chawinga 22', 47', 49'	Report	Gomes (yellow card) 34'	Stadium: CPKC Stadium; Attendance: 11,500; Referee: Laura Rodriguez

May 16, 2026 10	North Carolina Courage	4–0	Chicago Stars FC	Cary, North Carolina
5:30 pm	Ijeh 47'; Sanchez 61'; Schlegel 65'; Matsukubo 86'	Report	Huitema (yellow card) 6'; Hayashi (yellow card) 54'	Stadium: WakeMed Soccer Park; Attendance: 10,023; Referee: John Griggs

May 24, 2026 11	Bay FC	0–1	Chicago Stars FC	San Jose, California
4:00 pm	Cometti (red card) 12'; Hutton (yellow card) 32'; Silkowitz (red card) 62'; Moreau (yellow card) 90'	Report	Gomes (yellow card) 45'; Swanson 70'; Hayashi (yellow card) 88'; Atkinson (yellow card) 90+5'	Stadium: PayPal Park; Attendance: 12,015; Referee: Atahan Yaya

May 31, 2026 12	Chicago Stars FC	0–2	San Diego Wave FC	Evanston, Illinois
12:00 pm		Report	Dudinha 3'; Dali (yellow card) 18'; Morroni (yellow card) 22'; Byars 90+13'	Stadium: Martin Stadium; Attendance: 6,014; Referee: Robert Vincze

July 5, 2026 13	Chicago Stars FC	3–2	Utah Royals	Evanston, Illinois
4:00 pm	Huitema 20', 86'; Pinto (yellow card) 42'; Staab 59'	Report	Lacasse 43'; Delzer 54' (pen.); Tejada (yellow card) 75'	Stadium: Martin Stadium; Attendance: 4,156; Referee: Laadi Issaka

July 10, 2026 14	Boston Legacy FC	2–0	Chicago Stars FC	Pawtucket, Rhode Island
7:00 pm	Gutierres 22' (pen.); Prince 58'; Caño (yellow card) 76'	Report		Stadium: Centreville Bank Stadium; Attendance: 7,463; Referee: Shawn Tehini

July 18, 2026 15	Chicago Stars FC	0–2	Angel City FC	Evanston, Illinois
5:30 pm	Alozie (yellow card) 45+6'; Farmer (yellow card) 82'	Report	Niehues 56' (pen.); Jónsdóttir 90+8'	Stadium: Martin Stadium; Attendance: 6,678; Referee: Rodrigo Albuquerque

July 24, 2026 16	Orlando Pride	1–0	Chicago Stars FC	Orlando, Florida
7:00 pm	Marta (penalty missed) 43'; Doyle 88'; McCutcheon (yellow card) 90+3'	Report	Joseph (yellow card) 90+4'	Stadium: Inter.co Stadium; Attendance: 6,657; Referee: John Griggs

August 1, 2026 17	Racing Louisville FC	2–1	Chicago Stars FC	Louisville, Kentucky
3:00 pm	Gacioch 55'; Fischer 62'	Report	Ouahabi (yellow card) 40'; Gomes 80'	Stadium: Lynn Family Stadium; Attendance: 5,148; Referee: Muhammad Kaleia

August 9, 2026 18	Chicago Stars FC	0–0	Bay FC	Evanston, Illinois
6:00 pm		Report	Hutton (yellow card) 49'; Collins (yellow card) 75'	Stadium: Martin Stadium; Attendance: 4,925; Referee: Iryna Petrunok

August 14, 2026 19	Seattle Reign FC	1–0	Chicago Stars FC	Seattle, Washington
9:00 pm	Mercado 53'	Report		Stadium: Lumen Field; Attendance: 7,646; Referee: Marie Durr

August 19, 2026 20	Houston Dash	5–0	Chicago Stars FC	Houston, Texas
7:00 pm	Rader 5', 42'; Ullmark 45+2'; Faasse 79'; Colaprico (yellow card) 62'; Boattin 90+1'	Report	Staab (yellow card) 45+2'	Stadium: Shell Energy Stadium; Attendance: 5,214; Referee: John Matto

August 23, 2026 21	Chicago Stars FC	3–2	Racing Louisville FC	Evanston, Illinois
1:00 pm	Joseph 34'; Swanson 62'; Grosso 83'	Report	Flint 49'; Morris 68'	Stadium: Martin Stadium; Attendance: 4,405; Referee: Corbyn May

August 29, 2026 22	Denver Summit FC	6–1	Chicago Stars FC	Centennial, Colorado
7:45 pm	Sonis 12'; Kössler 19', 58'; Yamamoto 47'; Flint 56'; Thomas 85'	Report	Ouahabi (yellow card) 41'; Grosso 53'	Stadium: Centennial Stadium; Attendance: 12,372; Referee: Edson Carvajal

September 6, 2026 23	Chicago Stars FC	0–6	North Carolina Courage	Evanston, Illinois
3:00 pm	Bike (yellow card) 45+2'; Franklin (yellow card) 84'	Report	Sanchez 11', 69' (pen.), 81'; Okafor 17'; Koyama 61'; Williams 63'; Shiragaki (yellow card) 80'	Stadium: Martin Stadium; Attendance: 4,722; Referee: Danielle Chesky

September 13, 2026 24	Portland Thorns FC	1–1	Chicago Stars FC	Portland, Oregon
6:00 pm	Maitane 22' (o.g.)	Report	Maitane (yellow card) 24': Wood 90+2'	Stadium: Providence Park; Attendance: 17,066; Referee: Natalie Simon

September 20, 2026 25	Chicago Stars FC	0–3	Washington Spirit	Evanston, Illinois
4:00 pm	Franklin (yellow card) 33'	Report	Rodman 7'; Sullivan 34' (pen.); Tamara Bolt 85'	Stadium: Martin Stadium; Attendance: 5,762; Referee: Brandon Stevis

September 25, 2026 26	Gotham FC	3–1	Chicago Stars FC	Harrison, New Jersey
7:00 pm	Purce (yellow card) 20'; Shaw 9', 66'; Kerr 50'; Bruninha (yellow card) 84'	Report	Gasper (yellow card) 14'; Pinto (yellow card) 28'; Dellarose 87'; Johnson (yellow card) 89'	Stadium: Sports Illustrated Stadium; Attendance: 9,176; Referee: Lauren Aldrich

October 4, 2026 27	Chicago Stars FC	0–3	Denver Summit FC	Evanston, Illinois
3:00 pm	Alozie (yellow card) 20'	Report	Sonis 8'; Heaps 26', 76'	Stadium: Martin Stadium; Attendance: 4,614; Referee: Jamie Padilla

October 18, 2026 28	Chicago Stars FC	1–3	Seattle Reign FC	Evanston, Illinois
6:00 pm	Charley 90'	Report	Mercado 38', 84'; Mondésir 80'	Stadium: Martin Stadium; Attendance: 3,501; Referee: Jeremy Scheer

October 23, 2026 29	Chicago Stars FC	1–3	Houston Dash	Evanston, Illinois
7:00 pm	Dellarose (yellow card) 87'; Staab 90+3'	Report	Klenke 4', (yellow card) 51'; Graham 54'; Puntigam (yellow card) 77'; Larisey 79'	Stadium: Martin Stadium; Attendance: 5,961; Referee: Adorae Monroy

November 1, 2026 30	Washington Spirit	2–0	Chicago Fire FC	Washington, D.C.
4:00 pm	Hatch (yellow card) 22'; Alozie 62' (o.g.); Rodman 85'	Report	Alozie (yellow card) 56'; Dellarose (yellow card) 60'	Stadium: Audi Field; Attendance: 19,322; Referee: Shawn Tehini

== Statistics ==
As of match played August 14, 2026

=== Appearances and goals ===
Starting appearances are listed first, followed by substitute appearances after the + symbol where applicable.

No.	Pos	Nat	Player	Total		NWSL		Playoffs	
No.	Pos	Nat	Player	Apps	Goals	Apps	Goals	Apps	Goals
Goalkeepers
1	GK	(United States) USA	Alyssa Naeher	8	0	8	0	0	0
22	GK	(United States) USA	Halle Mackiewicz	1	0	0+1	0	0	0
27	GK	(United States) USA	Katie Atkinson	11	0	11	0	0	0
Defenders
3	DF	(United States) USA	Sam Staab	19	1	18+1	1	0	0
5	DF	(Nigeria) NGR	Michelle Alozie	11	0	8+3	0	0	0
6	DF	(Germany) GER	Kathrin Hendrich	10	0	8+2	0	0	0
12	DF	(Finland) FIN	Natalia Kuikka	0	0	0	0	0	0
14	DF	(United States) USA	Taylor Wood	5	0	4+1	0	0	0
15	DF	(United States) USA	Elise Evans	1	0	0+1	0	0	0
25	DF	(Mexico) MEX	Aaliyah Farmer	16	0	12+4	0	0	0
29	DF	(Spain) ESP	Leila Ouahabi	5	0	3+2	0	0	0
Midfielders
7	MF	(Canada) CAN	Julia Grosso	14	0	13+1	0	0	0
10	MF	(United States) USA	Brianna Pinto	16	0	14+2	0	0	0
13	MF	(Bermuda) BER	Leilanni Nesbeth	5	0	0+5	0	0	0
16	MF	(Japan) JPN	Manaka Hayashi	18	0	16+2	0	0	0
20	MF	(United States) USA	Bea Franklin	11	0	4+7	0	0	0
28	MF	(United States) USA	Emma Egizii	6	0	1+5	0	0	0
31	MF	(Germany) GER	Anna Gasper	3	0	2+1	0	0	0
34	MF	(United States) USA	Tessa Dellarose	12	1	10+2	1	0	0
77	MF	(Spain) ESP	Maitane López	14	0	13+1	0	0	0
Forwards
4	FW	(United States) USA	Jenna Bike	16	0	8+8	0	0	0
8	FW	(United States) USA	Jameese Joseph	16	0	12+4	0	0	0
9	FW	(United States) USA	Mallory Swanson	8	1	5+3	1	0	0
11	FW	(Portugal) POR	Nádia Gomes	16	2	14+2	2	0	0
18	FW	(Colombia) COL	Ivonne Chacón	13	0	2+11	0	0	0
23	FW	(United States) USA	Micayla Johnson	14	0	0+14	0	0	0
24	FW	(United States) USA	Ryan Gareis	11	0	11	0	0	0
99	FW	(Canada) CAN	Jordyn Huitema	12	4	12	4	0	0
Players away on loan:
2	DF	(United States) USA	Sam Angel	0	0	0	0	0	0
19	GK	(United States) USA	Mackenzie Wood	0	0	0	0	0	0

== Transactions ==
=== Contract operations ===
Date	Player	Pos.	Fee/notes	Contract until	Ref.
November 4, 2025	(Canada) Julia Grosso	MF	Re-signing	2028	
December 10, 2025	(United States) Alyssa Naeher	GK	Free agent re-signing	2026	
December 22, 2025	(Portugal) Nádia Gomes	FW	Free agent re-signing	2026	

=== Transfers in ===
Date	Player	Pos.	Previous club	Fee/notes	Contract until	Ref.
December 1, 2025	(United States) Brianna Pinto	MF	(United States) North Carolina Courage	Free agent signing	2027	
December 3, 2025	(United States) Ryan Gareis	FW	(United States) Houston Dash	Free agent signing	2028	
December 15, 2025	(United States) Katie Lund	GK	(United States) Racing Louisville	Free agent signing	2028	
December 23, 2025	(Nigeria) Michelle Alozie	DF	(United States) Houston Dash	Traded for $40,000 in allocation money	2026 + mutual option	
January 16, 2026	(United States) Elise Evans	DF	(United States) Stanford Cardinal	College signing	2028	
January 17, 2026	(United States) Tessa Dellarose	MF	(United States) North Carolina Tar Heels	College signing	2028	
January 19, 2026	(United States) Emma Egizii	MF	(United States) UCLA Bruins	College signing	2028	
February 3, 2026	(Mexico) Aaliyah Farmer	DF	(Mexico) Tigres UANL	Undisclosed transfer	2028	
March 12, 2026	(Canada) Jordyn Huitema	FW	(United States) Seattle Reign	Traded for $300,000, and $200,000 in allocation money	2028	
June 16, 2026	(Spain) Leila Ouahabi	DF	(England) Manchester City	Free agent signing	2028	
July 9, 2026	(Germany) Anna Gasper	MF	(Portugal) Benfica	Undisclosed transfer	2027	

=== Transfers out ===
Date	Player	Pos.	Destination club	Fee/notes	Ref.
December 1, 2025	(United States) Camryn Biegalski	DF	(United States) Denver Summit	Out of contract	
December 1, 2025	(United States) Meg Boade	MF	(United States) Denver Summit	Out of contract	
December 1, 2025	(United States) Ava Cook	FW	(United States) Carolina Ascent	Out of contract	
December 1, 2025	(United States) Shea Groom	MF	(United States) Carolina Ascent	Out of contract	
December 1, 2025	(United States) Cari Roccaro	MF		Out of contract	
December 1, 2025	(United States) Ally Schlegel	FW	(United States) North Carolina Courage	Out of contract	
December 1, 2025	(United States) Stephanie Sparkowski	GK	(Sweden) Piteå IF	Out of contract	
January 8, 2026	(United States) Hannah Anderson	DF	(United States) Orlando Pride	Traded for $70,000 in intraleague transfer funds	
January 13, 2026	(Brazil) Ludmila	FW	(United States) San Diego Wave	Traded for $800,000 in intraleague transfer funds	
March 12, 2026	(United States) Mackenzie Wood	GK	(United States) Portland Thorns	Loaned through the 2026 NWSL season	
May 30, 2026	(United States) Taylor Rath	GK		Short-term contract expired	
June 30, 2026	(Bermuda) Leilanni Nesbeth	MF		Mutually agreed to part ways ahead of contract expiration	
July 18, 2026	(United States) Sam Angel	DF	(United States) DC Power FC	Loaned through the 2026 NWSL season	
August 6, 2026	(Germany) Kathrin Hendrich	DF	(Germany) FC Köln	Transferred out	
