= 2025 Chicago Stars FC season =

Chicago Stars FC
2025 season
- Majority owner: Laura Ricketts
- General manager: Richard Feuz
- Head coach: Lorne Donaldson (until April 30); Masaki Hemmi (until July 3); Ella Masar (until August 22); Anders Jacobson (since August 23)
- Stadium: SeatGeek Stadium (capacity: 20,000)
- NWSL: 14th of 14
- Playoffs: Did not qualify
- Top goalscorer: League: Ludmila (10); All: Ludmila (10)
- Highest home attendance: 26,942 (Jun 14 vs SEA)
- Lowest home attendance: 1,806 (Mar 30 vs LOU)
- Biggest win: 5–2 (Sep 7 vs ORL)
- Biggest defeat: 6–0 (Mar 15 vs ORL)
Home colors	Away colors
- All statistics correct as of November 1, 2025.

The 2025 Chicago Stars FC season was the team's seventeenth as a professional women's soccer team, and twelfth in the National Women's Soccer League (NWSL), the top tier of women's soccer in the United States. Based in Bridgeview, Illinois, and formerly known as the Chicago Red Stars, the club rebranded to Chicago Stars FC prior to the 2025 season.

== Background ==
Under head coach Lorne Donaldson, the Red Stars finished in eighth place and advanced to the 2024 postseason. However, Chicago was quickly eliminated in the first round after eventual champions Orlando Pride flattened the Red Stars in a 6–1 victory. The Red Stars also participated in the inaugural version of the NWSL x Liga MX Femenil Summer Cup, but failed to advance past the group stage.

=== Branding changes ===
In October 2024, the club rebranded to Chicago Stars FC, unveiling a new crest along with the name. Chicago continued as the Red Stars through the end of 2024, at which point they executed the rebrand prior to the 2025 season.

As part of a league-wide refresh, the Stars announced a new secondary kit in February 2025. The club's new jersey consists of a black background with liquid metal patterns meant to "[symbolize] the relentless intensity that lies within and the team's ability to adapt to any challenge."

== Stadium and facilities ==
For the tenth season in a row, the Stars used SeatGeek Stadium as its primary home venue. The club continued to find difficulty selling tickets and ranked as the least successful NWSL team in terms of attendance through the first eight games of the year. In September 2025, the Stars announced that the club would be playing at the lakefront Martin Stadium on the campus of Northwestern University for 2026. Chicago played one 2025 match at Martin Stadium, a 5–2 victory over the Orlando Pride that set a second-highest season attendance marker for the Stars. The attendance numbers were only less than in Chicago's match against Seattle Reign FC at Soldier Field in June.

== Team ==
=== Coaching staff ===
As of October 13, 2025

Coaching
Interim head coach	Anders Jacobson
Assistant coach	Ella Masar
Assistant coach	Karina Báez
Interim head coach	Brenton Saylor

=== Current squad ===
As of November 1, 2025

No.	Nat.	Name	Date of birth (age)	Since	Previous team	Notes (Note: denotes a season-ending injury.)
Goalkeepers
1	(United States)	Alyssa Naeher	April 20, 1988 (aged 36)	2016	(United States) Boston Breakers	–
19	(United States)	Mackenzie Wood	July 4, 2000 (aged 24)	2023	(United States) Notre Dame Fighting Irish	–
22	(United States)	Halle Mackiewicz	September 24, 2001 (aged 23)	2025	(Sweden) Trelleborgs FF	–
27	(United States)	Stephanie Sparkowski	April 18, 2002 (aged 22)	2025	(United States) Michigan Wolverines	RRC
Defenders
2	(United States)	Sam Angel	October 26, 2000 (aged 24)	2025	(Sweden) IFK Norrköping	–
3	(United States)	Sam Staab	March 28, 1997 (aged 27)	2024	(United States) Washington Spirit	–
6	(Germany)	Kathrin Hendrich	April 6, 1992 (aged 32)	2025	(Germany) VfL Wolfsburg	INT
12	(Finland)	Natalia Kuikka	December 1, 1995 (aged 29)	2024	(United States) Portland Thorns FC	INT
30	(United States)	Camryn Biegalski	August 11, 1998 (aged 26)	2024	(United States) Washington Spirit	–
32	(United States)	Taylor Malham	May 20, 1999 (aged 25)	2023	(United States) Racing Louisville FC	–
41	(United States)	Hannah Anderson	April 3, 2001 (aged 23)	2024	(United States) Texas Tech Red Raiders	–
Midfielders
4	(United States)	Cari Roccaro	July 18, 1994 (aged 30)	2023	(United States) Angel City FC	–
10	(United States)	Shea Groom	March 4, 1993 (aged 32)	2024	(United States) Chicago Red Stars	
11	(United States)	Meg Boade	July 3, 2002 (aged 22)	2025	(United States) Gotham FC	–
13	(Bermuda)	Leilanni Nesbeth	July 17, 2001 (aged 23)	2024	(United States) Florida State Seminoles	–
16	(Japan)	Manaka Hayashi	August 14, 2004 (aged 20)	2025	(United States) Santa Clara Broncos	INT
20	(United States)	Bea Franklin	October 4, 2000 (aged 24)	2024	(United States) Arkansas Razorbacks	–
21	(Canada)	Julia Grosso	August 29, 2000 (aged 24)	2024	(Italy) Juventus	INT
77	(Spain)	Maitane López	March 13, 1995 (aged 30)	2025	(United States) NJ/NY Gotham FC	INT
Forwards
7	(United States)	Ava Cook	October 3, 1998 (aged 26)	2022	(United States) Michigan State Spartans	–
8	(United States)	Jameese Joseph	May 3, 2002 (aged 22)	2024	(United States) NC State Wolfpack	–
9	(United States)	Mallory Swanson	April 29, 1998 (aged 26)	2021	(United States) Sky Blue FC	ML
14	(Brazil)	Ludmila	December 1, 1994 (aged 30)	2024	(Spain) Atlético Madrid	INT
18	(Colombia)	Ivonne Chacón	October 12, 1997 (aged 27)	2025	(Spain) Levante UD	INT
23	(United States)	Micayla Johnson	January 18, 2008 (aged 17)	2025	(United States) Michigan Hawks	U18
24	(United States)	Jenna Bike	February 2, 1998 (aged 27)	2023	(United States) NJ/NY Gotham FC	–
26	(Portugal)	Nádia Gomes	November 9, 1996 (aged 28)	2024	(United States) San Francisco Glens	–
34	(United States)	Ally Schlegel	February 7, 2000 (aged 25)	2023	(United States) Penn State Nittany Lions	–

== Competitions ==
Win Draw Loss

=== Preseason ===
Chicago Stars FC played in four closed-door preseason friendlies prior to kicking off the NWSL regular season in March.

February 25	Chicago Stars FC	–	Washington Spirit	Bradenton, Florida
				Stadium: IMG Academy
Note: Closed-door scrimmage. No scoreline announced.

February 28	Chicago Stars FC	–	Orlando Pride	Bradenton, Florida
				Stadium: IMG Academy
Note: Closed-door scrimmage. No scoreline announced.

March 2	Chicago Stars FC	–	Kansas City Current	Bradenton, Florida
				Stadium: IMG Academy
Note: Closed-door scrimmage. No scoreline announced.

March 8	Chicago Stars FC	–	Racing Louisville FC	Bradenton, Florida
				Stadium: IMG Academy
Note: Closed-door scrimmage. No scoreline announced.

=== Regular season ===
March 15 1	Orlando Pride	6–0	Chicago Stars FC	Orlando, Florida
8:00 pm	McCutcheon 7'; Watt 36'; Anderson 47' (o.g.); Doyle 65'; Banda 80', 87'; Chilufya (yellow card) 82'	Report	Gomes (yellow card) 52'; Malham (yellow card) 60'	Stadium: Inter&Co Stadium; Attendance: 19,237; Referee: Shawn Tehini

March 23 2	Chicago Stars FC	1–2	Houston Dash	Bridgeview, Illinois
	Joseph 17'; Schlegel (yellow card) 39'; Malham (yellow card) 57'		Nielsen 20'; Colaprico (yellow card) 31'; Graham 64'	Stadium: SeatGeek Stadium; Attendance: 3,376; Referee: Iryna Petrunok

March 30 3	Chicago Stars FC	0–1	Racing Louisville FC	Bridgeview, Illinois
4:00 pm ET	Gaynor (yellow card) 12'; Roccaro (yellow card) 41'; Groom (yellow card) 84'	Report	Sears 27'	Stadium: SeatGeek Stadium; Attendance: 1,806; Referee: Laura Rodriguez

April 14 4	Bay FC	1–2	Chicago Stars FC	San Jose, California
4:00 p.m. PDT (UTC-7)	Conti 57' (pen.); Kundananji (yellow card) 90'	Report	Ludmila 4', 40'; Biegalski (yellow card) 47'; Grosso (yellow card) 83'	Stadium: PayPal Park; Attendance: 12,320; Referee: Brad Jensen

April 19 5	Utah Royals	1–0	Chicago Stars FC	Sandy, Utah
7:30 pm MDT (UTC-7)	Pogarch (yellow card) 63'; Sentnor 90+10' (pen.)	Report	Ludmila (yellow card) 44'; Nesbeth (yellow card) 90+3'	Stadium: America First Field; Attendance: 17,085; Referee: John Matto

April 27 6	Chicago Stars FC	0–3	San Diego Wave FC	Bridgeview, Illinois
4:30 pm PT		Report	Lundkvist 31'; Staab 81' (o.g.); Ascanio 90+3'	Stadium: SeatGeek Stadium; Referee: Danielle Chesky

May 4 7	Gotham FC	0–0	Chicago Stars FC	Harrison, New Jersey
10:00 am ET	Howell (yellow card) 90+4'	Report	Nesbeth (yellow card) 90+2'; Curran (yellow card) 90+2'	Stadium: Sports Illustrated Stadium; Attendance: 7,330; Referee: Adorae Monroy

May 10 8	Chicago Stars FC	2–3	Washington Spirit	Bridgeview, IL
11:50 a.m. CDT (UTC-5)	Grosso 36'; Staab 54'	Report	Schlegel 31' (o.g.); Kouassi 41'; Monday 83'; McKeown (yellow card) 90+9'	Stadium: SeatGeek Stadium; Attendance: 3,425; Referee: Trevor Wiseman

May 17 9	North Carolina Courage	2–0	Chicago Stars FC	Cary, North Carolina
5:00 p.m. Eastern Daylight Time (UTC-5)	Jackson (yellow card) 29'; Matsukubo 51', 77'	Report	Roccaro (yellow card) 67'; Malham (yellow card) 90+2'	Stadium: WakeMed Soccer Park; Attendance: 8,592; Referee: Jaclyn Metz

May 25 10	Chicago Stars FC	1–3	Kansas City Current	Bridgeview, Illinois
	Groom 51'	Report	DiBernardo (yellow card) 12'; Bia Zaneratto 34'; Rodríguez (yellow card) 37'; Chawinga 41'; Sharples 60'	Stadium: SeatGeek Stadium; Attendance: 3,886; Referee: Matthew Thompson

June 8 11	Angel City FC	2–2	Chicago Stars FC	Los Angeles, California
7:00 p.m. PDT (UTC-7)	Dufour (yellow card) 20'; Fuller 29'; Gorden (yellow card) 37'; Tiernan (yellow card) 43'; Vignola 80'	Report	Gomes 58'; Schlegel 66'	Stadium: BMO Stadium; Attendance: 17,538; Referee: Brad Jensen

June 14 12	Chicago Stars FC	2–2	Seattle Reign FC	Chicago, Illinois
2:00 pm PDT	Ludmila 11', 13'	Report	Curry (yellow card) 67'; Biyendolo 87'; Bugg 89'	Stadium: Soldier Field; Attendance: 26,942; Referee: Shawn Tehini

June 22 13	Portland Thorns	1–0	Chicago Stars FC	Portland, Oregon
7:00 pm PDT	Tordin 59'	Report		Stadium: Providence Park; Attendance: 17,779; Referee: Iryna Petrunok

August 2 14	Chicago Stars FC	1–1	Gotham FC	Bridgeview, Illinois
8:00 pm ET	Schlegel 68'	Report	Harper 39'	Stadium: SeatGeek Stadium; Attendance: 2,874; Referee: Muhammad Hassan

August 10 15	Chicago Stars FC	1–1	Bay FC	Bridgeview, Illinois
	Groom 42'	Report	Huff 29'	Stadium: SeatGeek Stadium; Attendance: 3,624; Referee: John Griggs

August 19 16	Seattle Reign FC	3–3	Chicago Stars FC	Seattle, Washington
7:00 pm PDT	Fishlock 3'; Huitema 34'; Adames 46'; Meza (yellow card) 88'	Report	Staab (yellow card) 56'; Ludmila 73'; Biegalski 78'; Naeher 90+9'	Stadium: Lumen Field; Attendance: 7,290; Referee: Greg Dopka

August 23 17	Chicago Stars FC	3–3	North Carolina Courage	Bridgeview, Illinois
	López (yellow card) 25'; Nesbeth (yellow card) 44'; Franklin (yellow card) 67'; Ludmila 76', 81', 86'	Report	Manaka Matsukubo (yellow card) 43' (goal) 49'; Lussi 62'; Shaw 83'	Stadium: SeatGeek Stadium; Attendance: 2,473; Referee: Luis Arroyo

August 31 18	Washington Spirit	1–1	Chicago Stars FC	Washington, DC
4:00 p.m. EDT (UTC-4)	Cantore 57'	Report	Joseph (yellow card) 22'; Ludmila 67'	Stadium: Audi Field; Attendance: 16,605; Referee: Marie Durr

September 7 19	Chicago Stars FC	5–2	Orlando Pride	Evanston, Illinois
	Staab 50'; Joseph 54' (yellow card) 85'; Franklin 65' (yellow card) 81'; Grosso 69'; Ludmila 89'; Nesbeth (yellow card) 90+4'	Report	Rafaelle (yellow card) 48'; Pickett 53'; McCutcheon 72'	Attendance: 10,127; Referee: Mark Verso

September 14 20	Chicago Stars FC	1–1	Portland Thorns	Bridgeview, Illinois
2:00 pm CDT	Franklin 45' (yellow card) 67'	Report	Moultrie 12'; Fleming (yellow card) 45+6'	Stadium: SeatGeek Stadium; Attendance: 3,751; Referee: Servando Berna Rico

September 20 21	Houston Dash	1–0	Chicago Stars FC	Houston, Texas
	Ryan 28'	Report	Staab (yellow card) 52'	Stadium: Shell Energy Stadium; Referee: Abdou Ndiaye

September 27 22	Kansas City Current	4–1	Chicago Stars FC	Kansas City, Missouri
7:00 p.m. CDT	Debinha 7'; Michelle Cooper (yellow card) 25'; Scott (yellow card) 31'; Zaneratto 51'; Chawinga 73'; LaBonta 90+5' (pen.)	Report	Franklin (yellow card) 13'; Gomes 58'; Cook (yellow card) 90+4'	Stadium: CPKC Stadium; Attendance: 11,500; Referee: Ekaterina Koroleva; Assistant referees: Matt Trotter, Stephen Milhoan; Fourth official: Velimir Stefanovic

October 5 23	Chicago Stars FC	2–2	Utah Royals	Bridgeview, Illinois
	Schlegel (yellow card) 32'; Biegalski (yellow card) 60'; Chacón 83'; Johnson 86'	Report	Tanaka 59' 66' (pen.); St-Georges (yellow card) 70'; Prašnikar (yellow card) 72'	Stadium: SeatGeek Stadium; Attendance: 3,710; Referee: Jaclyn Metz

October 11 24	Racing Louisville FC	1–1	Chicago Stars FC	Louisville, Kentucky
7:30 pm ET	Weber (yellow card) 45+1'; Balcer 90+3'	Report	Nesbeth (yellow card) 82'; Joseph 85'	Stadium: Lynn Family Stadium; Attendance: 5,703; Referee: Greg Dopka

October 19 25	San Diego Wave	6–1	Chicago Stars FC	San Diego, California
7:00 pm PT	Cascarino 7'; Staab 15' (o.g.); Dudinha 18', 57'; McNabb 44'; Dali 83'	Report	Ludmila (yellow card) 50'; Franklin 71'	Stadium: Snapdragon Stadium; Attendance: 16,920; Referee: Atahan Yaya

November 2 26	Chicago Stars FC	2–1	Angel City FC	Bridgeview, Illinois
	Joseph 49'; Malham (yellow card) 56'; Schlegel 90+8'	Report	Moriya 23'; Niehues (yellow card) 30'	Stadium: SeatGeek Stadium; Attendance: 4,219; Referee: Lauren Aldrich

==== Regular-season standings ====
Pos	Team	Pld	W	D	L	GF	GA	GD	Pts
10	Houston Dash	26	8	6	12	27	39	−12	30
11	Angel City FC	26	7	6	13	31	41	−10	27
12	Utah Royals	26	6	7	13	28	42	−14	25
13	Bay FC	26	4	8	14	26	41	−15	20
14	Chicago Stars FC	26	3	11	12	32	54	−22	20

Source: NWSL
Rules for classification: 1) points; 2) total goal difference; 3) total wins; 4) total goals scored; 5) head-to-head points; 6) head-to-head goals scored; 7) fewest disciplinary points; 8) coin toss (if 2 clubs tied) or drawing of lots (if ≥3 clubs tied).

== Statistics ==
As of November 2, 2025

=== Appearances and goals ===
Starting appearances are listed first, followed by substitute appearances after the + symbol where applicable.

No.	Pos	Nat	Player	Total		NWSL	
No.	Pos	Nat	Player	Apps	Goals	Apps	Goals
Goalkeepers
1	GK	(United States) USA	Alyssa Naeher	23	1	23	1
19	GK	(United States) USA	Mackenzie Wood	0	0	0	0
22	GK	(United States) USA	Halle Mackiewicz	4	0	3+1	0
27	GK	(United States) USA	Stephanie Sparkowski	0	0	0	0
Defenders
2	DF	(United States) USA	Sam Angel	4	0	3+1	0
3	DF	(United States) USA	Sam Staab	26	2	25+1	2
6	DF	(Germany) GER	Kathrin Hendrich	13	0	12+1	0
12	DF	(Finland) FIN	Natalia Kuikka	7	0	5+2	0
30	DF	(United States) USA	Camryn Biegalski	20	1	16+4	1
32	DF	(United States) USA	Taylor Malham	26	0	26	0
41	DF	(United States) USA	Hannah Anderson	11	0	4+7	0
Midfielders
4	MF	(United States) USA	Cari Roccaro	14	0	14	0
10	MF	(United States) USA	Shea Groom	14	2	9+5	2
11	MF	(United States) USA	Meg Boade	0	0	0	0
13	MF	(Bermuda) BER	Leilanni Nesbeth	10	0	2+8	0
16	MF	(Japan) JPN	Manaka Hayashi	17	0	7+10	0
20	MF	(United States) USA	Bea Franklin	23	3	18+5	3
21	MF	(Canada) CAN	Julia Grosso	24	2	23+1	2
77	MF	(Spain) ESP	Maitane López	22	0	20+2	0
Forwards
7	FW	(United States) USA	Ava Cook	10	0	0+10	0
8	FW	(United States) USA	Jameese Joseph	21	4	16+5	4
9	FW	(United States) USA	Mallory Swanson	0	0	0	0
14	FW	(Brazil) BRA	Ludmila	24	10	21+3	10
18	FW	(Colombia) COL	Ivonne Chacón	5	1	1+4	1
23	FW	(United States) USA	Micayla Johnson	15	1	0+15	1
24	FW	(United States) USA	Jenna Bike	8	0	6+2	0
26	FW	(Portugal) POR	Nádia Gomes	19	2	7+12	2
34	FW	(United States) USA	Ally Schlegel	26	3	24+2	3
Players who left the club during the season:
11	MF	(United States) USA	Chardonnay Curran	6	0	0+6	0
15	FW	(United States) USA	Sarah Griffith	0	0	0	0
18	DF	(United States) USA	Justina Gaynor	2	0	1+1	0
25	FW	(United States) USA	Catherine Barry	4	0	0+4	0

=== Assists ===
Rank	No.	Pos.	Nat.	Name	NWSL
1	34	FW	(United States)	Ally Schlegel	5
2	3	DF	(United States)	Sam Staab	4
3	21	MF	(Canada)	Julia Grosso	3
4	8	FW	(United States)	Jameese Joseph	2
4	26	FW	(Portugal)	Nádia Gomes	2
4	77	MF	(Spain)	Maitane López	2
5	14	FW	(Brazil)	Ludmila	1
5	16	MF	(Japan)	Manaka Hayashi	1
5	18	FW	(United States)	Ivonne Chacón	1
5	20	MF	(United States)	Bea Franklin	1
5	30	DF	(United States)	Camryn Biegalski	1
5	32	DF	(United States)	Taylor Malham	1
Total					24

=== Clean sheets ===
Rank	No.	Nat.	Name	NWSL
1	1	(United States)	Alyssa Naeher	1
Total				1

=== Disciplinary record ===
No.	Pos.	Nat.	Name	NWSL		
No.	Pos.	Nat.	Name	Yellow card	(yellow card) (yellow-red card)	Red card
3	DF	(United States)	Sam Staab	2	0	0
4	MF	(United States)	Cari Roccaro	2	0	0
7	FW	(United States)	Ava Cook	1	0	0
8	FW	(United States)	Jameese Joseph	2	0	0
10	MF	(United States)	Shea Groom	1	0	0
11	MF	(United States)	Chardonnay Curran	1	0	0
13	MF	(Bermuda)	Leilanni Nesbeth	5	0	0
14	FW	(Brazil)	Ludmila	3	0	0
16	MF	(Japan)	Manaka Hayashi	1	0	0
18	DF	(United States)	Justina Gaynor	1	0	0
20	MF	(United States)	Bea Franklin	4	0	0
21	MF	(Canada)	Julia Grosso	1	0	0
26	FW	(Portugal)	Nádia Gomes	1	0	0
30	DF	(United States)	Camryn Biegalski	2	0	0
32	DF	(United States)	Taylor Malham	4	0	0
34	FW	(United States)	Ally Schlegel	2	0	0
77	MF	(Spain)	Maitane López	1	0	0
Total				34	0	0

== Transactions ==
=== Contract operations ===
Date	Player	Pos.	Notes	Ref.
December 10, 2024	(United States) Camryn Biegalski	DF	Re-signed to a one-year extension through 2025.	
December 10, 2024	(Portugal) Nádia Gomes	FW	Re-signed to a short-term contract through March 25, 2025.	
January 14, 2025	(United States) Sarah Griffith	FW	Re-signed to a short-term contract through June 30, 2025.	
March 28, 2025	(Portugal) Nádia Gomes	FW	Extended through June 30, 2025.	
April 10, 2025	(United States) Catherine Barry	FW	Re-signed to a short-term contract through June 30, 2025.	
June 24, 2025	(United States) Taylor Malham	DF	Re-signed to a two-year contract extension through 2027 with a mutual option for 2028.	
June 25, 2025	(United States) Mackenzie Wood	GK	Re-signed to a two-year contract through 2027.	
July 1, 2025	(United States) Jameese Joseph	FW	Re-signed to a three-year contract extension through 2028 with a mutual option for 2029.	
July 1, 2025	(Portugal) Nádia Gomes	FW	Extended through July 31, 2025.	
July 1, 2025	(United States) Stephanie Sparkowski	GK	Extended through July 29, 2025.	
July 25, 2025	(United States) Bea Franklin	MF	Re-signed to a two-year contract through 2027.	
August 1, 2025	(Portugal) Nádia Gomes	FW	Extended through the end of the 2025 NWSL season.	
September 18, 2025	(United States) Halle Mackiewicz	GK	Re-signed to a one-year contract through 2026.	
October 8, 2025	(United States) Meg Boade	MF	Extended through November 22, 2025.	
October 23, 2025	(United States) Sam Staab	DF	Re-signed to a four-year contract through 2029.	
October 24, 2025	(United States) Stephanie Sparkowski	GK	Re-signed to a roster relief contract.	

=== Loans out ===
Date	Player	Pos.	Destination club	Fee/notes	Ref.
March 27, 2025	(United States) Sarah Griffith	FW	(Canada) Calgary Wild FC	Loaned through June 30, 2025.	

=== Transfers in ===
Date	Player	Pos.	Previous club	Fee/notes	Ref.
December 5, 2024	(Spain) Maitane López	MF	(United States) NJ/NY Gotham FC	Free agent signed to a two-year contract through 2026.	
December 9, 2024	(United States) Halle Mackiewicz	GK	(Sweden) Trelleborgs FF	Free agent signed to a one-year contract through 2025.	
January 15, 2025	(Japan) Manaka Hayashi	MF	(United States) Santa Clara Broncos	Rookie signed to a three-year contract through 2027.	
January 24, 2025	(United States) Micayla Johnson	FW	(United States) Michigan Hawks	Under-18 player signed to a three-year contract through 2027.	
March 12, 2025	(United States) Justina Gaynor	DF	(United States) Michigan State Spartans	Rookie signed to a one-year contract through 2025 with a mutual option for 2026.	
March 13, 2025	(United States) Catherine Barry	FW	(United States) South Carolina Gamecocks	Rookie signed to a roster relief contract.	
June 3, 2025	(United States) Stephanie Sparkowski	GK	(United States) Michigan Wolverines	Rookie signed to a roster relief contract.	
June 11, 2025	(Germany) Kathrin Hendrich	DF	(Germany) VfL Wolfsburg	Acquired on a free transfer and signed to a two-year contract through 2026 with a mutual option for 2027.	
June 23, 2025	(United States) Sam Angel	DF	(Sweden) IFK Norrköping	Acquired in exchange for an undisclosed transfer fee and signed to a two-year contract through 2027 with a mutual option for 2028.	
August 25, 2025	(United States) Meg Boade	MF	(United States) Gotham FC	Free agent signed to a roster relief contract.	
August 28, 2025	(Colombia) Ivonne Chacón	FW	(Spain) Levante UD	Acquired in exchange for an undisclosed transfer fee and signed to a two-year contract through 2027.	

=== Transfers out ===
Date	Player	Pos.	Destination club	Fee/notes	Ref.
December 10, 2024	(Brazil) Julia Bianchi	MF	(Brazil) SC Internacional	Out of contract.	
December 10, 2024	(United States) Ally Cook	FW	(United States) Spokane Zephyr FC	Out of contract.	
December 10, 2024	(United States) Sophie Jones	MF	(United States) Sporting Club Jacksonville	Out of contract.	
December 10, 2024	(United States) Tatumn Milazzo	DF	(United States) Utah Royals	Out of contract.	
December 10, 2024	(Germany) Maximiliane Rall	DF	(Germany) VfB Stuttgart	Out of contract.	
December 10, 2024	(Jamaica) Sydney Schneider	GK	(United States) Tampa Bay Sun FC	Out of contract.	
June 30, 2025	(United States) Sarah Griffith	FW	(United States) Lexington SC	Out of contract.	
June 30, 2025	(United States) Catherine Barry	FW	(United States) Lexington SC	Out of contract.	
June 30, 2025	(United States) Justina Gaynor	DF	(United States) Lexington SC	Mutual contract termination.	
July 29, 2025	(United States) Chardonnay Curran	MF	(Portugal) Rio Ave	Mutual contract termination.	

=== Preseason trialists ===
Trialists are non-rostered invitees during preseason and are not automatically signed. The Stars released their preseason roster on January 27, 2025. Midfielder Cassie Rohan was added to the Stars' preseason squad on February 19.

Player	Pos.	Previous club	Status	Ref.
(United States) Catherine Barry	FW	(United States) South Carolina Gamecocks	Signed to roster relief contract.	
(United States) Justina Gaynor	MF	(United States) Michigan State Spartans	Signed to standard contract.	
(Jamaica) Peyton McNamara	MF	(United States) Ohio State Buckeyes	Not signed.	
(United States) Cassie Rohan	MF	(Sweden) Sundsvalls DFF	Not signed.	
(Jamaica) Sydney Schneider	GK	(United States) Chicago Stars FC	Not signed.	
(United States) Macy Schultz	FW	(United States) Arkansas Razorbacks	Not signed.	
(United States) Stephanie Sparkowski	GK	(United States) Michigan Wolverines	Signed to roster relief contract.	
(United States) Dasia Torbert	MF	(United States) Georgia Bulldogs	Not signed.	
