= Micayla Johnson =

American soccer player (born 2008)

- Johnson with the Chicago Stars in 2026

Personal information
- Full name: Micayla Elaine Johnson
- Date of birth: January 18, 2008 (age 18)
- Height: 5 ft 6 in (1.68 m)
- Position: Forward

Team information
- Current team: Chicago Stars
- Number: 23

Youth career
- Nationals Soccer
- 2023–2024: Michigan Hawks

Senior career*
Years	Team	Apps	(Gls)
2025–	Chicago Stars	37	(1)

International career^{‡}
2023	United States U-15	2	(2)
2024	United States U-16	4	(3)
2024–2025	United States U-17	15	(7)
2026–	United States U-19	4	(2)
2026–	United States U-20	8	(4)
- * Club domestic league appearances and goals as of 05:41, November 2, 2026 (UTC) ‡ National team caps and goals as of September 16, 2026

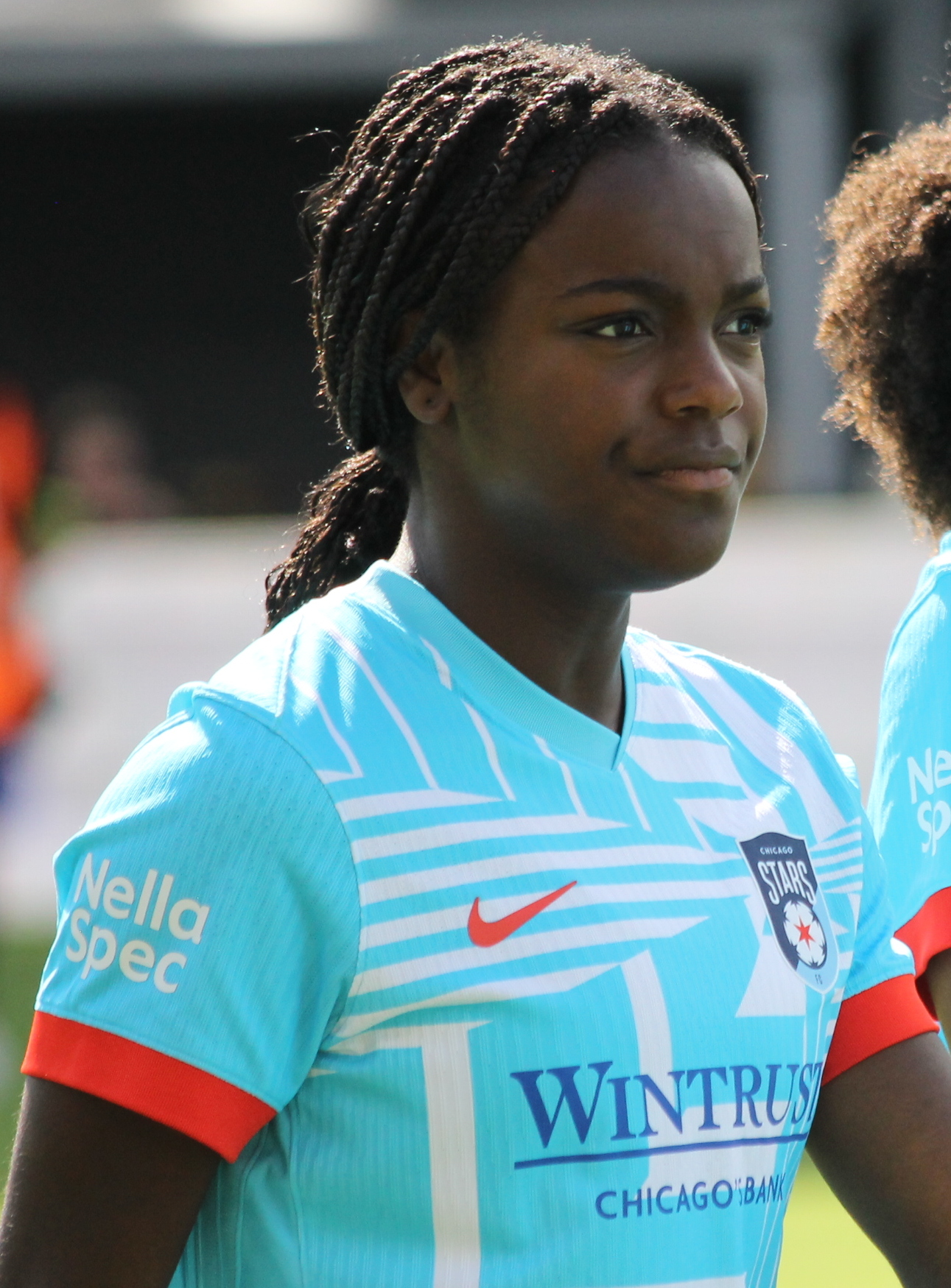
Johnson with the Chicago Stars in 2025

Micayla Elaine Johnson (born January 18, 2008) is an American professional soccer player who plays as a forward for Chicago Stars FC of the National Women's Soccer League (NWSL). She signed with the Stars at age 17 in 2025. She won bronze with the United States at the 2024 FIFA U-17 Women's World Cup.

== Early life ==
Johnson grew up in Troy, Michigan, where she attended Troy High School. She helped Nationals Soccer win the Girls Academy (GA) under-14 national title in 2022, earning the Golden Boot as the tournament's top scorer. In 2023, she won the GA Champions Cup with the club. Later that year, she joined Michigan Hawks and led the club to the ECNL under-15 national title. She trained with the NWSL's Racing Louisville FC as a non-roster invitee in the 2024 preseason. Before she went pro, she was committed to play college soccer for the Florida State Seminoles.

== Club career ==
Chicago Stars FC announced on January 24, 2025, that they had signed Johnson to her first professional contract on a three-year deal. She made her professional debut in the season opener, coming on as a second-half substitute for Nádia Gomes in a 6–0 defeat to defending champions Orlando Pride. On October 5, she scored her first professional goal with the late 2–2 equalizer against the Utah Royals; it was her last appearance of the year before departing for the 2025 FIFA U-17 Women's World Cup.

On August 23, 2026, Johnson made her first professional start in a 3–2 victory over Racing Louisville, playing 65 minutes in the Stars' first win under interim head coach Karina Báez.

== International career ==
Johnson began training with the United States under-15 team in 2023. She helped the under-16 team win the UEFA Friendship Tournament in Turkey in 2024, scoring three goals in the friendly event. She appeared in all six games for the under-17s at the 2024 FIFA U-17 Women's World Cup in the Dominican Republic, scoring in a 2–0 win against Colombia, as the United States placed third, its best result since 2008.

The following year, Johnson scored four goals and added two assists in the CONCACAF qualifiers for the 2025 FIFA U-17 Women's World Cup. During that year's U-17 World Cup in Morocco, she scored two goals in four games and became the first American to score in consecutive editions of the competition. In the round of 16 against the Netherlands, she scored a stunning 1–1 equalizer from distance, then converted a penalty in the resulting shutout loss.

Johnson scored twice in four games for the under-20 team at the 2026 FIFA U-20 Women's World Cup in Poland, becoming the first American to score at youth World Cups in three consecutive years. Brazil eliminated the United States on penalties in the round of 16.

== Honors ==
United States U-17

- FIFA U-17 Women's World Cup bronze medal: 2024
