= Stephanie Sparkowski =

American soccer player (born 2002)

Personal information
- Full name: Stephanie Elisabeth Sparkowski
- Date of birth: April 18, 2002 (age 24)
- Height: 6 ft 0 in (1.83 m)
- Position: Goalkeeper

Team information
- Current team: Piteå IF
- Number: 1

College career
Years	Team	Apps	(Gls)
2021–2024	Michigan Wolverines	39	(0)

Senior career*
Years	Team	Apps	(Gls)
2022	Long Island Rough Riders	2	(0)
2025	Chicago Stars	0	(0)
2026–	Piteå IF	2	(0)
- * Club domestic league appearances and goals as of 15:57, June 18, 2026 (UTC)

Stephanie Elisabeth Sparkowski (born April 18, 2002) is an American professional soccer player who plays as a goalkeeper for Swedish Damallsvenskan club Piteå IF. She played college soccer for the Michigan Wolverines.

== Early life ==
Sparkowski grew up in East Meadow, New York, where she attended East Meadow High School. She captained the school's soccer team and was a four-year varsity letterwinner. As a senior, she was named a Fall All-American and also received the opportunity to play in the 2019 Allstate High School All-American game. The very same year, Sparkowski became the first female student to play on East Meadow's football team. She played in 7 games as a placekicker, sometimes in a close timeframe with her soccer commitments. She also played basketball and lacrosse for her school, as well as soccer with New York's ODP team.

== College career ==
In her senior year of high school, Sparkowski committed to the University of Michigan. She joined the Wolverines in 2021, but did not see any playing time in her first two seasons of college soccer. She made her collegiate debut early in her junior year, appearing in a dominant victory over Central Michigan on September 4, 2022. However, she only played in 2 more games and continued to experience time as a backup goalkeeper.

Following the departure of Izzy Nino in 2023, Sparkowski quickly ascended to a starting position and played in all 18 of Michigan's matches for two seasons in a row. She was responsible for 6 clean sheets in her first year at the helm and also sported an 81% save percentage. The Big Ten Conference recognized her performances with two consecutive Big Ten Goalkeeper of the Week honors in September 2023. During the Wolverines' first-round NCAA tournament loss, she made 7 saves to help prevent a more lopsided defeat.

The following season, Michigan and got off to a slow start, conceding goals and going winless in the first 6 game of the season. In their seventh match, a home game against Alabama, Sparkowski helped turn the tide and made several saves to help the Wolverines earn a shutout victory. Later on in the year, she broke her single-game save record and entered double digits, recording 10 against Penn State. In both of her latter two seasons, Sparkowski was recognized with the Big Ten Sportsmanship Award.

== Club career ==
=== Long Island Rough Riders ===
During the offseason leading up to her junior year of college, Sparkowski played with the Long Island Rough Riders in the pre-professional USL W League. She appeared in four regular season matches and one playoff fixture, recording a clean sheet in all five of her appearances except for the playoff game.

=== Chicago Stars ===
After completing her time with Michigan, Sparkowski joined Chicago Stars FC's 2025 preseason squad as a non-rostered invitee. Although she was not offered a contract at the start of the Stars' NWSL campaign, Sparkowski later signed her first professional contract with Chicago on June 3, 2025, inking a roster relief contract to replace injured Stars backup Mackenzie Wood. Following the expiry of her contract, Sparkowski spent three months as a free agent before joining Chicago once again in October 2025; another injury to Wood had opened the door for Sparkowski to play for Chicago on a roster relief contract for the second time. She did not make any appearances for the Stars before departing at the end of the season as a free agent.

=== Piteå IF ===
On January 15, 2026, Swedish club Piteå IF announced that they had signed Sparkowski to a two-year contract.

== International career ==
Sparkowski has attended various United States youth national team camps, with her first call-up arriving in 2016. On March 13, 2017, she was invited to an under-16 training camp in San Diego. Eight years later, Lisa Cole summoned Sparkowski back into the youth national team fold, inviting her to an under-23 training camp starting in March 2025.

== Personal life ==
On December 2, 2024, Sparkowski got engaged to Jade Gray.

== Career statistics ==
=== Club ===
As of June 3, 2025

Appearances and goals by club, season and competition
Club	Season	League			Cup		Playoffs (Note: Includes the USL W League Playoffs and NWSL Playoffs)		Total	
Club	Season	Division	Apps	Goals	Apps	Goals	Apps	Goals	Apps	Goals
Long Island Rough Riders	2022	USL W League	4	0	—		1	0	3	0
Chicago Stars FC	2025	NWSL	0	0	—		—		0	0
Career total			2	0	0	0	1	0	3	0
