= Emma Egizii =

American soccer player (born 2003)

- Egizii with the Chicago Stars in 2026

Personal information
- Full name: Emma Soledad Egizii
- Date of birth: March 6, 2003 (age 23)
- Place of birth: Downey, California, U.S.
- Height: 5 ft 4 in (1.63 m)
- Position: Midfielder

Team information
- Current team: Chicago Stars
- Number: 28

Youth career
- Beach FC

College career
Years	Team	Apps	(Gls)
2021–2025	UCLA Bruins	50	(11)

Senior career*
Years	Team	Apps	(Gls)
2026–	Chicago Stars	16	(0)

International career
2019	United States U17	4	(0)
- * Club domestic league appearances and goals as of 05:47, November 2, 2026 (UTC)

Emma Soledad Egizii (born March 6, 2003) is an American professional soccer player who plays as a midfielder for Chicago Stars FC of the National Women's Soccer League (NWSL). She played college soccer for the UCLA Bruins, winning the 2022 national championship and earning third-team All-American honors in 2025.

== Early life ==
Egizii was born and raised in Downey, California, as one of two children born to Nancy and Mario Egizii. She started playing soccer at the age of 4, eventually going on to join club team Beach FC. Despite tearing her ACL in late 2019, Egizii received 2019–20 High School All-America honors and was named within the Top 20 best players in her graduating class by TopDrawerSoccer. She attended Warren High School, but chose not to play prep soccer for Warren.

== College career ==
Ten minutes into her collegiate debut for the UCLA Bruins in the team's fall 2021 season opener against UC Irvine, Egizii picked up a knee injury and was forced to redshirt the rest of the season. After returning to the field in 2022, she scored her first college goal near the end of the season, netting in the Bruins' NCAA tournament first-round victory over Northern Arizona on November 11. Egizii went on make two further NCAA appearances as UCLA win the national title for the second time in program history, beating North Carolina in the final. In 2023, Egizii started in 13 of her 15 appearances and scored two goals, both of which came in a three-day span in early October.

In 2024, Egizii contributed two goals in UCLA's win over Long Beach State to kick off the season on a positive note. She appeared in two more matches before picking up a season-ending injury on August 28. She watched from the sidelines as the Bruins finished their first season in the Big Ten Conference as conference tournament champions. In her final season at UCLA, Egizii had a breakout year, setting personal career highs in multiple statistical categories. She started in all 20 of her appearances, ranked second on the Bruins with 6 goals, and led the Bruins with 6 assists. She was particularly productive at the end of the season, registering 4 goals and 4 assists in UCLA's final 7 games. One of her goals was game-tying tally against BYU in the second round of the NCAA tournament, which the Bruins ultimately lost on penalties. At the end of the year, she was named to the All-American third team, All-Big Ten first team, and the All-North Region first team.

== Club career ==
On January 19, 2026, Chicago Stars FC announced that they had signed Egizii to her first professional contract, a three-year deal through 2028. She made her pro debut on March 15, 2026, coming on as a second-half substitute for Jameese Joseph in Chicago's season-opening defeat to Angel City FC. On April 25, she recorded her first professional start, helping Chicago earn a home victory over NWSL expansion team Boston Legacy FC. In a match against the Portland Thorns on September 15, Egizii assisted Taylor Wood's stoppage-time equalizer to help Chicago steal a draw in the final minutes of the game. She totaled 16 appearances in her rookie season as the Stars finished the season in last place.

== International career ==
At age 14, Egizii received her first call-up to the United States Youth National Team program. She has gone on to represent the United States at multiple youth levels, ranging from under-14 to under-19. In 2019, she recorded 4 appearances for the under-17 national team.

== Honors and awards ==
UCLA Bruins

- NCAA Division I women's soccer tournament: 2022
- Pac-12 Conference: 2021, 2023
- Big Ten women's soccer tournament: 2024

Individual

- Third-team All-American: 2025
- First-team All-Big Ten: 2025
