= Ryan Connaughton =

American soccer player (born 1998)

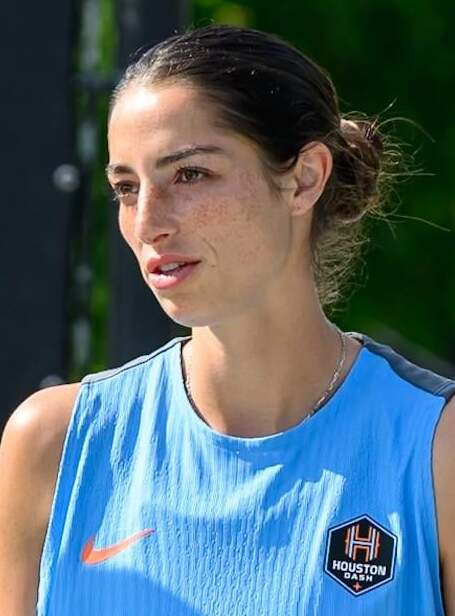
- Gareis with the Houston Dash in 2025

Personal information
- Birth name: Ryan Melissa Gareis
- Date of birth: November 13, 1998 (age 27)
- Place of birth: Naperville, Illinois
- Height: 5 ft 7 in (1.70 m)
- Position: Left winger

Team information
- Current team: Chicago Stars
- Number: 24

Youth career
- Sockers FC

College career
Years	Team	Apps	(Gls)
2017–2021	South Carolina Gamecocks	100	(15)

Senior career*
Years	Team	Apps	(Gls)
2022–2025	Houston Dash	47	(1)
2026–	Chicago Stars	11	(0)

International career
2013	United States U15		
- * Club domestic league appearances and goals as of 05:43, November 2, 2026 (UTC)

Ryan Melissa Connaughton (née Gareis; born November 13, 1998) is an American professional soccer player who plays as a left winger for Chicago Stars FC of the National Women's Soccer League. She played college soccer for the South Carolina Gamecocks before being selected in the 2022 NWSL Draft by the Houston Dash.

== Early life ==
Connaughton is originally from Naperville, Illinois. She attended Neuqua Valley High School, where she scored the most goals for the team her freshman year. She was a member of Sockers FC and played in the Elite Clubs National League (ECNL) and won U.S. Club Soccer's National Championship in 2012 & 2013.

In 2013, Connaughton attended a U15 Girls' U.S. Youth National Team Training Camp. Connaughton was a member of Illinois' Olympic Development Program (ODP) in 2010 and 2014. Connaughton played for the Illinois ODP team when they played in the National Championships in 2014.

== College career ==
Connaughton played college soccer at South Carolina from 2017 to 2021. She was named to the SEC All-Freshman Team after her rookie year. She went on to score 15 goals in exactly 100 games across her five-season college career.

== Club career ==
=== Houston Dash ===
In December 2021, Connaughton was selected by the Houston Dash in the fourth round of the 2022 NWSL Draft. On February 18, 2022, Connaughton signed a two-year contract with Houston. She made 20 appearances for the Dash in the 2022 season, and was named the club's Young Player of the Year. In January 2023, she signed a contract extension with Houston.

Connaughton scored her first NWSL goal on October 18, 2025, coming off the bench to score the lone goal in Houston's 1–0 win against the Kansas City Current that ending the Current's 17-game unbeaten streak. At the end of 2025, Connaughton left Houston as a free agent.

=== Chicago Stars ===
On December 3, 2025, the Chicago Stars announced that Connaughton had signed a three-year contract with the club through 2028.

== International career ==
She attended training camp with the United States under-15 team in 2013.

== Personal life ==
She and Pat Connaughton announced their relationship in June 2023. In January 2024, they announced Connaughton was pregnant. They got engaged in February 2024 and were married in June 2026. Their son was born in May 2024.

== Career statistics ==
=== Club ===
As of May 31, 2026

Club	Season	League			Cup (Note: Includes the NWSL Challenge Cup)		Playoffs (Note: Includes NWSL Playoffs)		Total	
Club	Season	Division	Apps	Goals	Apps	Goals	Apps	Goals	Apps	Goals
Houston Dash	2022	NWSL	15	0	5	0	0	0	20	0
Houston Dash	2023	NWSL	12	0	3	0	—		15	0
Houston Dash	2024	NWSL	7	0	—		—		7	0
Houston Dash	2025	NWSL	19	1	—		—		19	1
Chicago Stars FC	2026	NWSL	11	0	—		—		11	0
Career total			64	1	8	0	0	0	72	1

== Honors ==
South Carolina Gamecocks

- SEC women's soccer tournament: 2019

Individual

- SEC All-Freshman Team: 2017
- United Soccer Coaches All-Southeast Region Third Team: 2021
- Houston Dash Young Player of the Year: 2022
