= Ally Schlegel =

American soccer player (born 2001)

- Schlegel with the Chicago Stars in 2024

Personal information
- Full name: Allison Mariana Schlegel
- Date of birth: February 7, 2000 (age 26)
- Place of birth: Englewood, Colorado, United States
- Height: 5 ft 6 in (1.68 m)
- Position: Forward

Team information
- Current team: North Carolina Courage
- Number: 35

Youth career
- Colorado Storm

College career
Years	Team	Apps	(Gls)
2018–2022	Penn State Nittany Lions	85	(47)

Senior career*
Years	Team	Apps	(Gls)
2023–2025	Chicago Stars	62	(12)
2026–	North Carolina Courage	19	(3)

International career
2015	United States U16		
2022	United States U23		
- * Club domestic league appearances and goals as of November 1, 2026

Allison Mariana Schlegel (born February 7, 2000) is an American professional soccer player who plays as a forward for the North Carolina Courage of the National Women's Soccer League (NWSL). She played college soccer for the Penn State Nittany Lions, earning first-team All-American honors twice. She was selected by the Chicago Red Stars in the second round of the 2023 NWSL Draft.

== Early life ==
Schlegel was born in Englewood, Colorado and grew up in Parker, Colorado, with her parents Mike and Angela Schlegel. When Schlegel was 10, she and her teammates received pink headbands at a soccer tournament. Schlegel continues to wear a pink headband as a personal brand while playing professionally. She attended Chaparral High School, but only played on its soccer team during her freshman year.

== College career ==
Schlegel played four years for the Penn State Nittany Lions from 2018 to 2022, scoring 47 goals and 20 assists in 85 appearances. She earned a first-team All-American selection in 2020 and was a two-time Hermann Trophy semi-finalist. Schlegel served as team captain in 2021 and 2022. In her final season in 2022, she led the Big Ten in goals.

== Club career ==
=== Chicago Stars ===
With the 11th pick of the second round in the 2023 NWSL Draft, the Chicago Red Stars (later named Chicago Stars FC) drafted Schlegel. On April 22, 2023, she scored her first professional goal against OL Reign. For the 2024 NWSL season, the Red Stars hired Lorne Donaldson as coach. The move reunited him with Schlegel, whom Donaldson had worked with at an youth soccer organization in Colorado. Schlegel went on to play three seasons for Chicago, recording 12 goals and 6 assists in 70 matches across all competitions. At the end of 2025, she departed Chicago as a free agent.

=== North Carolina Courage ===
On December 4, 2025, the North Carolina Courage announced the signing of Schlegel on a three-year contract with the option for another year. On May 16, 2026, she scored her first goal for the club in a 4–0 win over former club Chicago Stars.

== International career ==
Schlegel played on the USWNT U-14, U-15, U-16, U-18, and U-23 teams.

== Personal life ==
Schlegel enjoys fly fishing.

== Career statistics ==
As of December 1, 2025

Appearances and goals by club, season and competition
Club	Season	League			Cup (Note: Includes the NWSL Challenge Cup)		Playoffs (Note: Includes NWSL Playoffs)		Other		Total	
Club	Season	Division	Apps	Goals	Apps	Goals	Apps	Goals	Apps	Goals	Apps	Goals
Chicago Stars FC	2023	NWSL	14	2	3	0	—		—		17	2
Chicago Stars FC	2024	NWSL	22	7	—		—		3 (Note: Appearances in the NWSL x Liga MX Femenil Summer Cup)	0	25	7
Chicago Stars FC	2025	NWSL	26	3	—		—		—		26	3
Career total			62	12	3	0	0	0	3	0	68	11

== Honors ==
Penn State Nittany Lions

- Big Ten Conference: 2018, 2020
- Big Ten tournament: 2019, 2022

Individual

- First-team All-American: 2020, 2022
- First-team All-Big Ten: 2019, 2020, 2022
- Second-team All-Big Ten: 2021
- Big Ten Forward of the Year: 2020
- Big Ten Freshman of the Year: 2019
- Big Ten tournament Offensive MVP: 2022
