= Bea Franklin =

American soccer player (born 2000)

- Franklin in 2026

Personal information
- Full name: Elizabeth Cashman Franklin
- Date of birth: October 4, 2000 (age 26)
- Height: 5 ft 10 in (1.78 m)
- Positions: Defensive midfielder; center back

Team information
- Current team: Chicago Stars
- Number: 20

Youth career
- Crossfire ECNL

College career
Years	Team	Apps	(Gls)
2019–2020	Notre Dame Fighting Irish	19	(1)
2021–2023	Arkansas Razorbacks	62	(15)

Senior career*
Years	Team	Apps	(Gls)
2024–	Chicago Stars	58	(4)
- * Club domestic league appearances and goals as of 05:47, November 2, 2026 (UTC)

Elizabeth Cashman Franklin (born October 4, 2000) is an American professional soccer player who plays as a defensive midfielder or center back for Chicago Stars FC of the National Women's Soccer League (NWSL). She played college soccer for the Notre Dame Fighting Irish and the Arkansas Razorbacks before being drafted by the Red Stars in the 2024 NWSL Draft. A former two-sport athlete, she also played for the Arkansas Razorbacks basketball team in her final year of college.

== Early life ==
A native of Seattle, Washington, Franklin grew up playing club soccer for Crossfire ECNL. She also dabbled in several other sports, including tennis and basketball. She attended Seattle Preparatory School, where she led the girls' soccer team to three Seattle Metro Championship titles and the Washington State Champion title in 2015. In her time with Seattle Prep, Franklin scored 59 goals and made 26 assists. She was named the 2018–19 Washington State Gatorade Player of the Year, the Seattle Times Player of the Year, and twice to the all-state first team.

== College career ==
=== Notre Dame Fighting Irish ===
Franklin started off her college sports career playing soccer for the Notre Dame Fighting Irish. In her freshman year at Notre Dame, Franklin starred in 15 games, starting 4. She scored her first college goal on October 31, 2019, scoring against Wake Forest in the 77th minute of the match. Franklin's goal helped the Fighting Irish clinch a spot in the 2019 ACC Championship match, knocking out their opponents. The following year, Franklin played in 4 games and accrued 96 minutes of total game time.

=== Arkansas Razorbacks ===
Franklin departed Notre Dame and joined the University of Arkansas ahead of the Razorbacks' 2021 fall campaign. She played in 18 games, starting half of them, in her first season with Arkansas. Her first Razorback goal came on October 21, 2021, against Auburn. She scored 4 more over the course of the season and accumulated 1667 minutes. As a senior, she started every single match of the campaign for the Razorbacks. She ended up scoring her first career brace on November 18, 2022, in a 5–2 NCAA Tournament win over Ohio State. Franklin played in one more season with the Razorbacks, taking advantage of the extra year of NCAA eligibility offered to athletes due to the COVID-19 pandemic. She made good use of the season, starting every match, scoring a team-high 9 goals, and leading the team in assists and points. She received numerous accolades, including SEC Midfielder of the Year, All-SEC First Team, USC All-America second team, and USC All-Southeast Region first team honors.

Following the conclusion of the soccer season, Franklin switched sports and joined the Arkansas Razorbacks women's basketball team. She played in 3 games for her team, making her collegiate basketball debut on December 7, 2023, against Louisiana Tech. After signing a contract in the NWSL, Franklin did not return to the Razorbacks basketball program.

== Club career ==
On January 12, 2024, Franklin was selected by the Chicago Red Stars (later named Chicago Stars FC) in the 3rd round of the 2024 NWSL Draft (41st overall). On March 13, the Stars signed Franklin to her first professional deal, a one-year contract with an additional club option. She made her professional debut on March 29, entering the match as a substitute for Julia Bianchi in a draw versus the Orlando Pride. On September 1, she scored her first professional goal as Chicago was defeated by Angel City FC, 2–1. Although having faced a one-game suspension in June due to misconduct committed in a match versus the Kansas City Current, Franklin managed to make a total of 16 appearances in her rookie season. She also started Chicago's lone playoff match, a 4–1 defeat at the hands of eventual champions Orlando.

Midway through her second professional season, Franklin re-signed with Chicago through the 2027 NWSL campaign. On September 7, 2025, she participated in the Stars' first-ever game at eventual 2026 home venue Northwestern Medicine Field at Martin Stadium; during the match, she scored a headed goal to help Chicago beat the Orlando Pride, 5–2.

== Personal life ==
Franklin's father, attorney Jesse Franklin IV, competed in rowing at the University of Washington and was inducted into the university's hall of fame in 1999. Her mother, Catherine, also an attorney, is also a fitness instructor. Her brother, Jesse Franklin V, was selected by the Major League Baseball team Atlanta Braves in the 2020 MLB draft.

Franklin majored in finance at the University of Arkansas and worked as a wealth management analyst for Bank of America during the 2025 NWSL season. As of spring 2026, she was preparing to take the CFA exam. Franklin has also spent her free time in the offseason as a cocktail waitress at the Pioneer Saloon in Ketchum, Idaho.

== Career statistics ==
=== Club ===
As of November 7, 2025

Club	Season	League			Cup (Note: Includes the NWSL Challenge Cup)		Playoffs (Note: Includes NWSL Playoffs)		Other		Total	
Club	Season	Division	Apps	Goals	Apps	Goals	Apps	Goals	Apps	Goals	Apps	Goals
Chicago Stars FC	2024	NWSL	16	1	—		1	0	3 (Note: Appearances in the NWSL x Liga MX Femenil Summer Cup)	0	20	1
Chicago Stars FC	2025	NWSL	23	3	—		—		—		23	3
Career total			39	4	0	0	1	0	3	0	43	4
