= Sam Angel (soccer) =

American soccer player (born 2000)

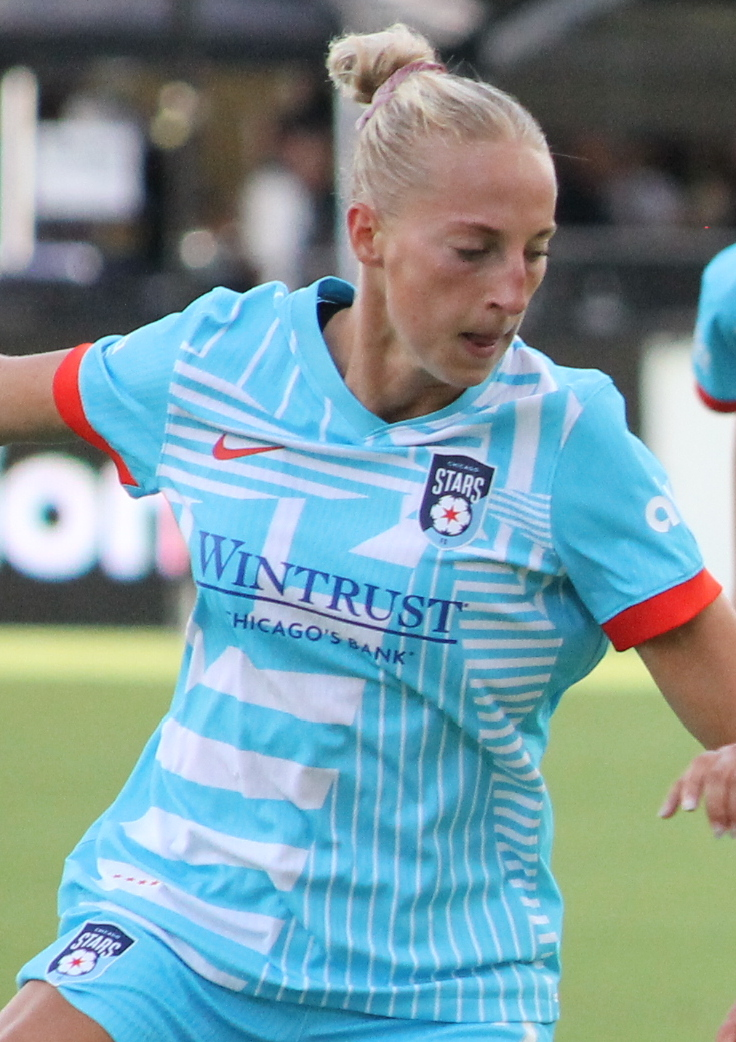
- Angel with the Chicago Stars in 2025

Personal information
- Full name: Samantha Sophie Cary Angel
- Birth name: Samantha Sophie Cary
- Date of birth: October 26, 2000 (age 26)
- Place of birth: St. Charles, Missouri, U.S.
- Height: 5 ft 8 in (1.73 m)
- Positions: Left back; center back

Team information
- Current team: DC Power FC (on loan from Chicago Stars)
- Number: 25

Youth career
- St. Louis Scott Gallagher

College career
Years	Team	Apps	(Gls)
2019–2023	Iowa Hawkeyes	97	(5)

Senior career*
Years	Team	Apps	(Gls)
2021	Chicago Red Stars Reserves		
2022	Racing Louisville (USL W)	11	(0)
2024–2025	IFK Norrköping	38	(3)
2025–	Chicago Stars	4	(0)
2026	→ Boston Legacy (loan)	0	(0)
2026–	→ DC Power FC (loan)	2	(0)
- * Club domestic league appearances and goals as of 16:34, August 22, 2026 (UTC)

Samantha Sophie Cary Angel (née Cary; October 26, 2000) is an American professional soccer player who plays as a left back or center back for USL Super League club DC Power FC, on loan from Chicago Stars FC of the National Women's Soccer League (NWSL). Angel played college soccer for the Iowa Hawkeyes, where she set program records in career appearances, starts, and minutes. She was selected by Racing Louisville FC in the 2024 NWSL Draft, but instead started her professional career with Swedish club IFK Norrköping.

== Early life ==
Angel was born and raised in St. Charles, Missouri. She began playing club soccer in second grade, starting off at a small club before joining St. Louis Scott Gallagher SC. Angel also ran track in middle school. She attended Francis Howell North High School, where she was a three-time all-state, all-region, and all-conference selection. She was a consistent team leader in goals and assists and helped lead the school to two district titles and one conference title.

== College career ==
Angel matriculated at the University of Iowa and majored in public health. She joined the Hawkeyes soccer program in 2019 after graduating from high school a semester early. She scored her first collegiate goal on September 13, 2019, netting a long-range strike in a 4–0 win over Northern Colorado. The next season, the Hawkeyes won the 2020 Big Ten title and advanced to the NCAA tournament, where the team recorded their first-ever NCAA victory with a win over Campbell in the first round. Angel provided the game-winning assist as the Hawkeyes triumphed by a 1–0 scoreline. The team was subsequently knocked out of the competition by UCLA.

During the summer leading up to her junior year of college, Angel played for the Chicago Red Stars Reserves. She would again seek out other playing opportunities in her 2022 offseason, eventually signing for Racing Louisville FC's USL W League team. She played in 11 matches as Louisville finished third in the Great Lakes Division.

In Angel's fifth year, the Hawkeyes secured another Big Ten title, marking Angel's second such honor with the team. Angel found individual success, winning the Defensive Player of the Tournament award and being named to the tournament first team. She was also named to the overall Big Ten second team and was recognized as a conference Player to Watch for the fourth consecutive season. Upon her departure from the program, Angel left the University of Iowa women's soccer program as the all-time leader in games played (97), games started (96), and minutes played (8,322). Across her 5-year college career, the left back also had 5 goals and 11 assists while being the anchor on the Iowa defensive backline.

== Club career ==
After completing her college career, Angel was drafted by the Racing Louisville FC NWSL team in the fourth round of the 2024 NWSL Draft. As the 48th overall pick, Angel became the first Hawkeye to ever be drafted into the National Women's Soccer League. She spent five weeks training with Racing Louisville and appeared in one preseason match. Ultimately, she departed from the club in March 2024 in search of development and playing time.

=== IFK Norrköping ===
On March 1, 2024, Angel signed her first professional contract with Damallsvenskan club IFK Norrköping, inking a one-year deal. She immediately slotted in as the starting left back and quickly started logging minutes with the Swedish team, starting in 26 of 26 Damallsvenskan league games. She scored her first Damallsvenskan goal on May 5, 2024, helping Norrköping beat rivals Linköping. In August 2024, Angel signed a 1-year contract extension with Norrköping, keeping her with the club through November 2025. She finished her rookie season as an Iron Woman, playing every minute of every game. She was a staple on the backline and helped IFK Norrköping finish 5th place in Damallsvenskan, the highest league finish in team history.

The following year, Angel helped lead the team to a historic Svenska Cupen run, where they reached the final before being defeated by Hammarby. She appeared in all of Norrköping's matches prior to her departure. In her final match with the club, she scored the game-tying goal against Växjö DFF in an eventual 1–1 draw.

=== Chicago Stars ===
Angel returned to the United States in June 2025, signing a two-year contract with Chicago Stars FC. She made her NWSL debut on August 31, 2025, starting and playing 72 minutes in a 1–1 draw with the Washington Spirit. Angel would go on to make 3 more appearances in her first year with Chicago as the Stars finished the season in last place.

On April 6, 2026, Angel joined NWSL expansion team Boston Legacy FC on loan through June with the mutual option for the clubs to extend the loan for the rest of the season. She did not earn any playing time for Boston before being recalled to Chicago on July 1, 2026.

On July 17, 2026, Angel was sent out on loan once again, this time to USL Super League club DC Power FC through the end of the year. She debuted for the club on August 15, 2026, earning the start in DC Power's season-opening loss to the Carolina Ascent.

== Personal life ==
Sam Angel is the daughter of Kim and Andrew Cary, and has one brother, Zac. She is married to Trey Angel. The couple met on the online dating app Tinder while at the University of Iowa and married in December 2023.

== Career statistics ==
=== Club ===
As of July 1, 2026

Appearances and goals by club, season and competition
Club	Season	League			Cup (Note: Includes Svenska Cupen)		Playoffs		Total	
Club	Season	Division	Apps	Goals	Apps	Goals	Apps	Goals	Apps	Goals
Racing Louisville FC (USL W)	2022	USL W League	11	0	—		—		11	0
IFK Norrköping	2024	Damallsvenskan	26	2	1	0	—		27	2
IFK Norrköping	2025	Damallsvenskan	12	1	5	0	—		17	1
IFK Norrköping	Total		38	3	6	0	0	0	44	3
Chicago Stars FC	2025	NWSL	4	0	—		—		4	0
Chicago Stars FC	2026	NWSL	0	0	—		—		0	0
Chicago Stars FC	Total		4	0	0	0	0	0	4	0
Boston Legacy FC (loan)	2026	NWSL	0	0	—		—		0	0
Career total			53	3	6	0	0	0	59	3
