= Pioneer Saloon =

Restaurant in Ketchum, Idaho, U.S.

- Interactive map of Pioneer Saloon

Restaurant information
- Owners: Duffy and Sheila Whitmore
- Food type: Steakhouse and seafood
- Location: Ketchum, Idaho, United States
- Coordinates: 43.6808°N 114.3643°W

Pioneer Saloon is a restaurant in Ketchum, Idaho, United States. It is nicknamed "the Pio" by locals.

== History ==
The restaurant was originally a gambling hall called the Commercial Club built in the 1940s. It closed a few years later, and was used as an American Legion meeting hall and dry goods store before becoming a casino again in 1950. It was then renamed the "Pioneer Saloon". In 1953, efforts to end illegal gambling in Idaho forced the establishment to become a bar and restaurant.

The Pioneer Saloon was renovated into its current form in 1972. In 1986, it was bought by Sheila and Duffy Whitmore, who run the restaurant with their children and grandchildren. Its interior is decorated with Western and Native American memorabilia and art, including sculptures and taxidermied animals. In his later years, Ernest Hemingway was a customer. Some memorabilia from Hemingway's home in Ketchum decorate the restaurant.

It was named one of "Americas's Classics" by the James Beard Foundation in 2025.

== Description ==
Its menu includes items like steak, prime rib, beef ribs, burgers, kebobs, smoked trout, and shrimp cocktail. The restaurant serves both beef and bison meat. Its signature dish is the "Jim Spud", a baked potato topped with teriyaki beef, cheese, caramelized onions and chives. The dish was named after Jim Freeman, former chef and general manager of the Pioneer Saloon.
