= Halle Mackiewicz =

American soccer player (born 2001)

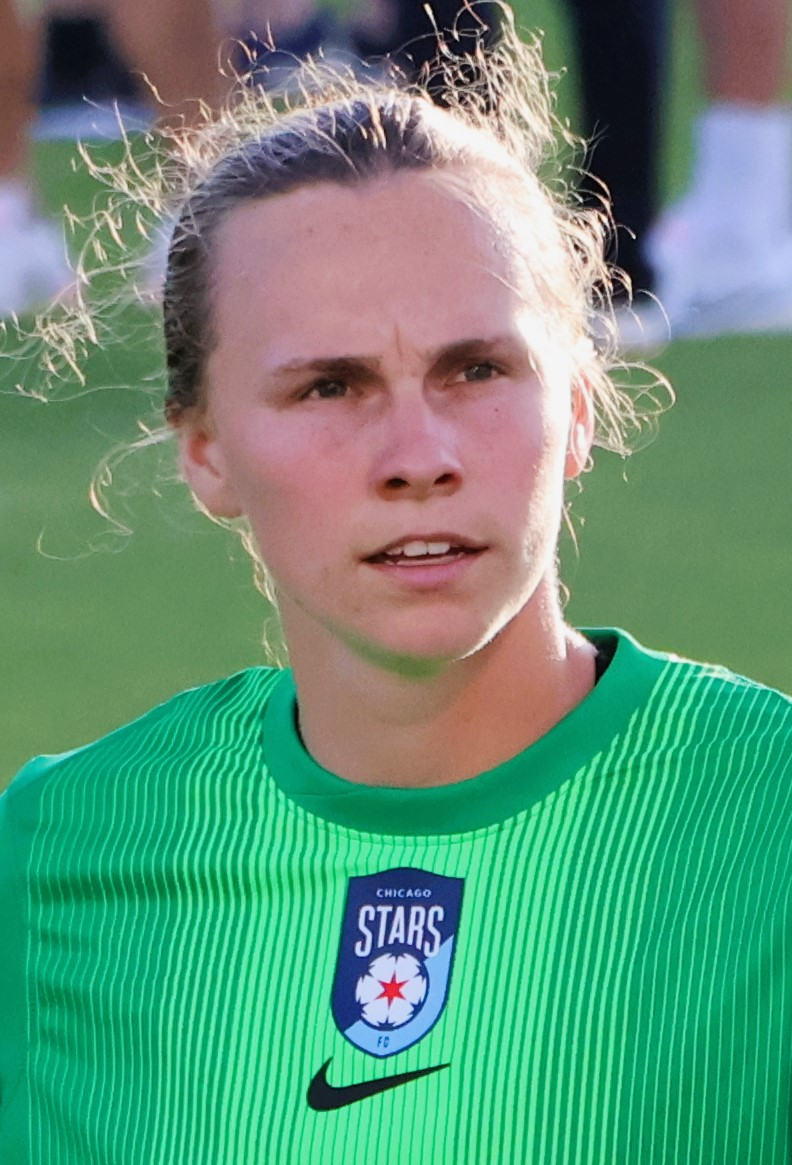
- Mackiewicz with the Chicago Stars in 2025

Personal information
- Full name: Halle Elizabeth Mackiewicz
- Date of birth: September 24, 2001 (age 25)
- Height: 5 ft 10 in (1.78 m)
- Position: Goalkeeper

Youth career
- Real Colorado

College career
Years	Team	Apps	(Gls)
2020–2023	Clemson Tigers	48	(0)

Senior career*
Years	Team	Apps	(Gls)
2024	Trelleborg	10	(0)
2025–2026	Chicago Stars	6	(0)

International career^{‡}
2017	United States U-17	1	(0)
2020	United States U-19	1	(0)
2019	United States U-20	2	(0)
- * Club domestic league appearances and goals as of November 1, 2026 ‡ National team caps and goals as of March 8, 2020

Halle Elizabeth Mackiewicz (born September 24, 2001) is an American former professional soccer player. She played college soccer for the Clemson Tigers and was named the ACC Goalkeeper of the Year in 2023. She had a three-year professional career with Swedish club Trelleborg and the Chicago Stars of the National Women's Soccer League (NWSL).

== Early life ==
Mackiewicz was raised in Broomfield, Colorado. She played soccer as a field player before being converted to goalkeeper by the age of ten. She attended Legacy High School, where she played one season of soccer as a freshman. She played club soccer for Real Colorado, which she helped lead to the DA under-16/17 national championship in 2018, conceding only one goal in six games. She was also a four-year starter for her high school basketball team, averaging 15.7 points and 6.2 rebounds per game.

== College career ==
After two years primarily as Hensley Hancuff's backup, Mackiewicz became the primary goalkeeper for the Clemson Tigers in her junior season in 2022, starting all 18 games and keeping 7 clean sheets. Mackiewicz had a breakout senior season in 2023, setting a program season record with 13 clean sheets (second-most in the nation) in 25 games. She helped the Tigers advance to the ACC tournament final and the first NCAA tournament semifinals in program history, both times falling to Florida State. In the NCAA round of 16, she saved a penalty kick from Croix Bethune to set up a 5–3 shootout victory over Georgia after a 1–1 draw. Mackiewicz was named Atlantic Coast Conference (ACC) Goalkeeper of the Year, first-team All-ACC, and second-team All-American.

== Club career ==
Mackiewicz was selected 32nd overall by the Kansas City Current in the third round of the 2024 NWSL Draft, but she was not signed to the roster while rehabilitating after a shoulder surgery. On August 20, 2024, she instead signde her first professional contract with Damallsvenskan club Trelleborg through the end of the year. She immediately won the starting job as previous starter Somea Položen had recently left the club. She made her professional debut in a 2–1 defeat to Norrköping on August 31. She remained the starter for the remainder of the season but could not prevent the winless club from relegation at the end of the campaign.

On December 9, 2024, the NWSL's Chicago Stars FC announced that they had signed Mackiewicz to a one-year contract. She began the season competing with Mackenzie Wood for the backup job behind Alyssa Naeher. On May 24, 2025, she made her NWSL debut in a 3–1 loss to the Kansas City Current, replacing an injured Naeher in stoppage time. She started the following three games, including a 2–2 draw with the Seattle Reign at historic Soldier Field, before Naeher returned to the lineup. On September 18, the Stars announced she had re-signed for the following season.

On May 16, 2026, after starting the season on the injury list, Mackiewicz made her first appearance of the year as an early substitute for an injured Naeher, but she lost 4–0 to the North Carolina Courage. She spent most of the year as third-stringer behind Naeher and new signing Katie Atkinson. On October 18, she made her only start of the year in a 3–1 loss to the Seattle Reign. She retired from professional soccer at the end of the season.

== International career ==
Mackiewicz was first invited to United States youth national team camps in 2016. During training with the under-17 team at the end of 2017, she tore her UCL and was ruled out of the 2018 CONCACAF Women's U-17 Championship. She returned to train with the under-17 and under-19 teams later that year and the under-20 team in 2019.

== Honors ==
Individual

- Second-team All-American: 2023
- First-team All-ACC: 2023
- ACC Goalkeeper of the Year: 2023
