= Ava Cook =

American soccer player (born 1998)

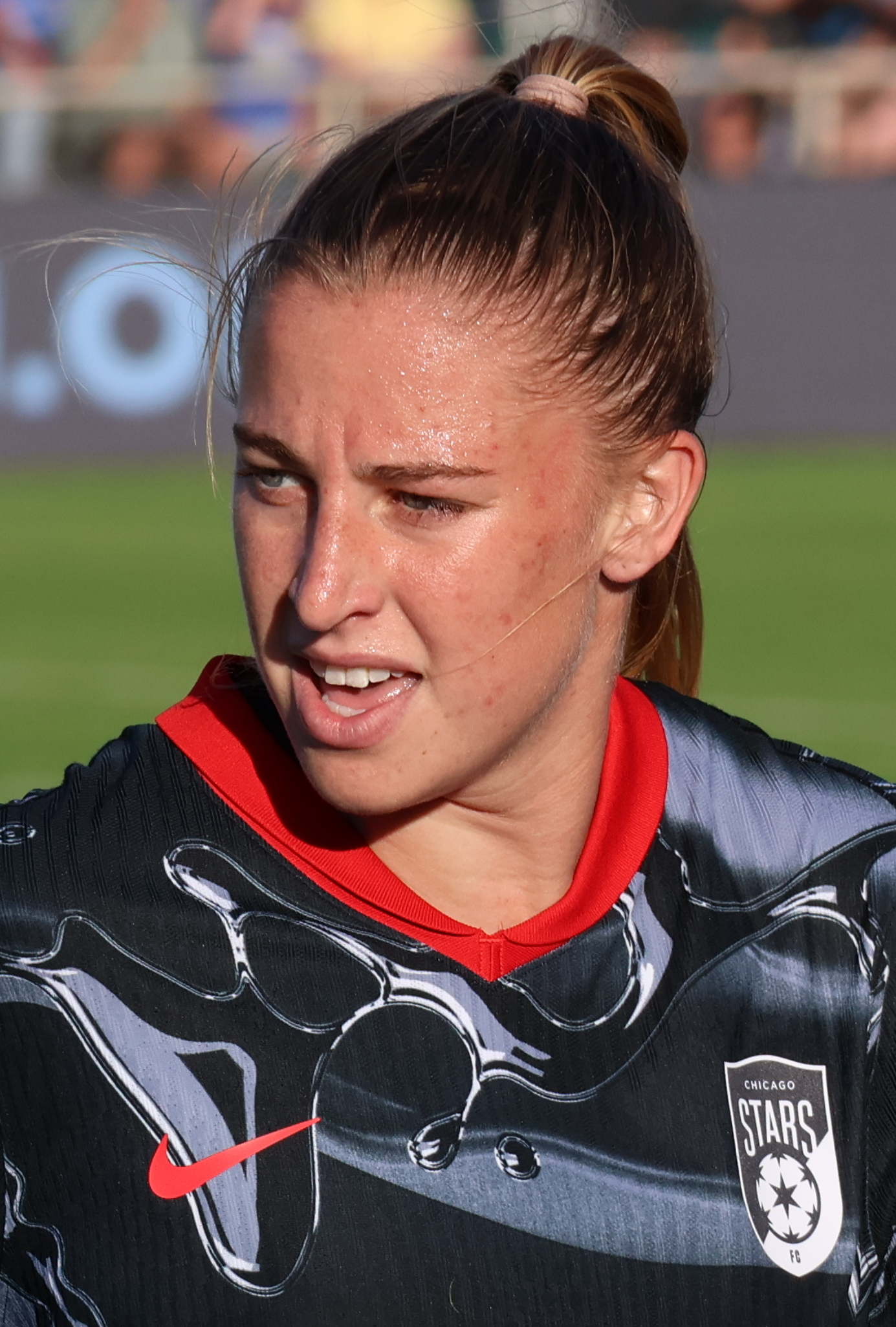
- Cook with the Chicago Stars in 2025

Personal information
- Full name: Ava Leigh Cook
- Date of birth: October 3, 1998 (age 28)
- Place of birth: Battle Creek, Michigan
- Height: 5 ft 10 in (1.78 m)
- Position: Forward

Team information
- Current team: Carolina Ascent
- Number: 4

College career
Years	Team	Apps	(Gls)
2017–2021	Grand Valley State Lakers	82	(74)
2021	Michigan State Spartans	17	(7)

Senior career*
Years	Team	Apps	(Gls)
2022–2025	Chicago Stars	51	(6)
2026–	Carolina Ascent	12	(0)

International career^{‡}
2022	United States U23	2	(2)
- * Club domestic league appearances and goals as of 17:24, June 4, 2026 (UTC) ‡ National team caps and goals as of April 24, 2024

Ava Leigh Cook (born October 3, 1998) is an American professional soccer player who plays as a forward for USL Super League club Carolina Ascent. She played college soccer for the Grand Valley State Lakers and the Michigan State Spartans. She was selected by the Chicago Red Stars in the second round of the 2022 NWSL Draft.

== Early life ==
Cook grew up in Battle Creek, Michigan, and played high school soccer and basketball for Lakeview High School. She played youth soccer for Midwest United.

== College career ==
Cook played four years of NCAA Division II college soccer at Grand Valley State University from 2017 to 2021, winning Great Lakes Intercollegiate Athletic Conference (GLIAC) titles in all four seasons. She was named second-team All-American and first-team All-GLIAC after leading the conference with 24 goals as a sophomore in 2018. She was named first-team All-American after leading Division II with 29 goals as a junior in 2019. She transferred to Michigan State University for a fifth season and was named second-team All-Big Ten after leading the team with seven goals.

== Club career ==
=== Chicago Stars ===
The Chicago Red Stars (later renamed Chicago Stars FC) selected Cook 18th overall in the second round of the 2022 NWSL Draft. She became a regular player and then starter for the Red Stars, appearing in 19 games of the 24-game NWSL season in 2022 and 20 games in 2023.

In mid-April 2024, after appearing in three games of the season, Cook tore her anterior cruciate ligament (ACL), causing her to miss the remainder of the season. At the end of 2025, Cook departed from the Stars. She had scored 6 times across 51 NWSL appearances in her four years with Chicago.

=== Carolina Ascent ===
After four seasons at Chicago, Cook signed with USL Super League club Carolina Ascent in January 2026. She made her Super League debut on February 7, 2026, coming on as a second-half substitute for Riley Parker in a 2–1 defeat to Lexington SC.

== International career ==
Cook was called up to the United States national under-23 team for a friendly tournament in June 2022. She scored her first goal for the team against India on June 26 and scored again against Sweden on June 28.

== Honors and awards ==
Grand Valley State Lakers

- NCAA Division II women's soccer tournament: 2019
- Great Lakes Intercollegiate Athletic Conference: 2017, 2018, 2019, 2020
- GLIAC women's soccer tournament: 2017, 2018, 2019, 2020

Individual

- Second-team All-Big Ten: 2021
- First-team NCAA D2 All-American: 2019
- Second-team NCAA D2 All-American: 2018
- First-team All-GLIAC: 2018, 2019, 2020
- Second-team All-GLIAC: 2017
- GLIAC Freshman of the Year: 2017
