= Manaka Hayashi =

Japanese footballer (born 2004)

Manaka Hayashi 林 愛花
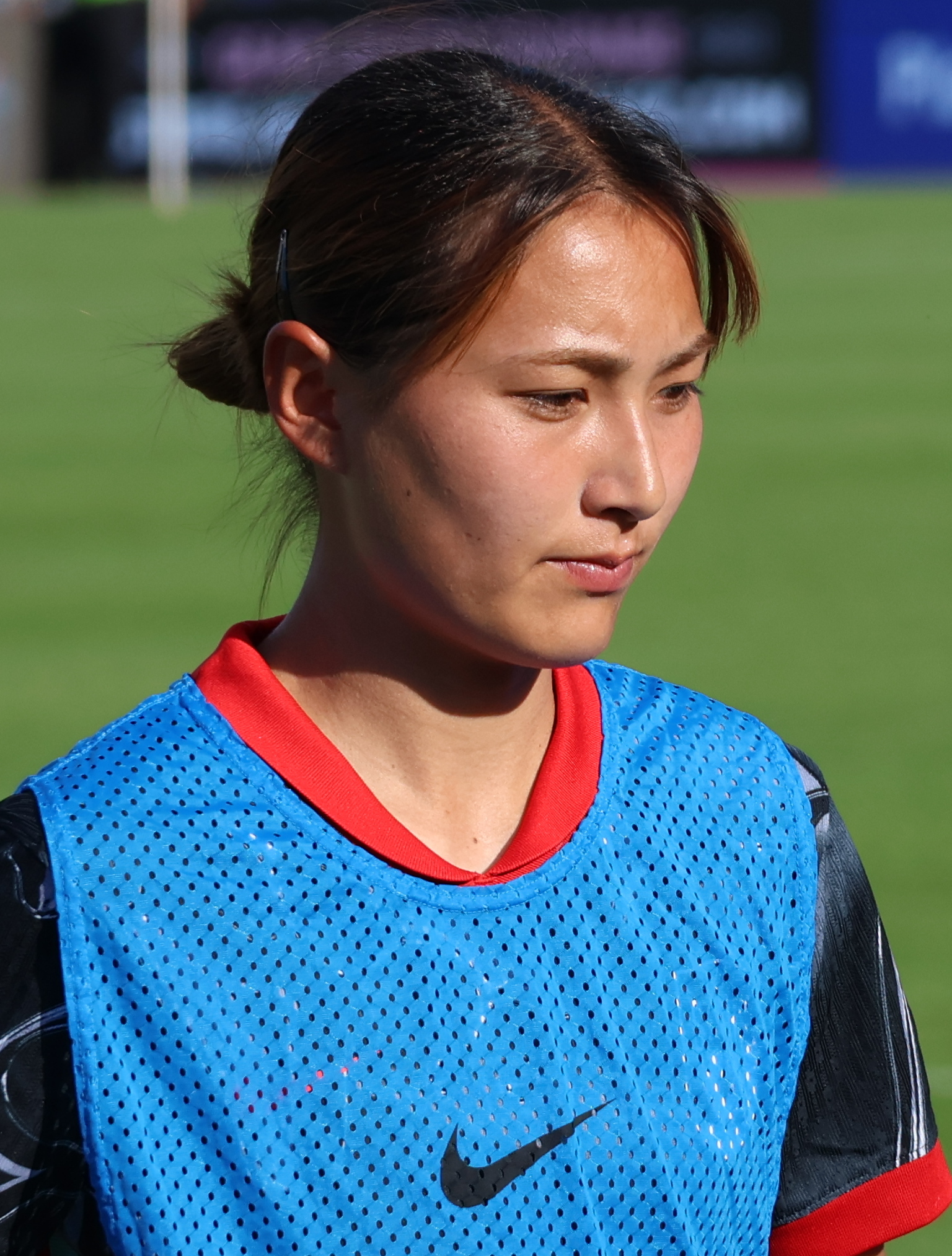
- Hayashi with the Chicago Stars in 2025

Personal information
- Date of birth: 14 August 2004 (age 22)
- Place of birth: Hyōgo, Japan
- Height: 1.64 m (5 ft 5 in)
- Position: Midfielder

Team information
- Current team: Juventus
- Number: 30

Youth career
- Eigashima Eleven Football Club
- 2017–2022: JFA Academy Fukushima

College career
Years	Team	Apps	(Gls)
2024	Santa Clara Broncos	9	(0)

Senior career*
Years	Team	Apps	(Gls)
2023	INAC Kobe Leonessa	2	(0)
2023–2024	Oakland Soul	7	(3)
2025–2026	Chicago Stars	38	(0)
2026–	Juventus	1	(0)

International career
2022–2024	Japan U20	11	(0)
- * Club domestic league appearances and goals as of 21:42, 13 October 2026 (UTC)

Manaka Hayashi (林 愛花, Hayashi Manaka; born 14 August 2004) is a Japanese professional footballer who plays as a midfielder for Serie A club Juventus.

== Club career ==
Hayashi played one season of college soccer for the Santa Clara Broncos. On 15 January 2025, it was announced that Hayashi had signed a three-year contract with National Women's Soccer League (NWSL) club Chicago Stars.

On 16 September 2026, it was announced that Hayashi had joined Italian club Juventus on a three-year deal.
