= Jenna Bike =

American soccer player (born 1998)

- Bike with the Chicago Stars in 2026

Personal information
- Full name: Jenna Elizabeth Bike
- Date of birth: February 2, 1998 (age 28)
- Place of birth: Trumbull, Connecticut, U.S.
- Height: 5 ft 6 in (1.68 m)
- Positions: Winger; right back

Team information
- Current team: Chicago Stars
- Number: 4

Youth career
- 2012–2015: St. Joseph High Cadets

College career
Years	Team	Apps	(Gls)
2016–2021	Boston College Eagles	89	(18)

Senior career*
Years	Team	Apps	(Gls)
2022	NJ/NY Gotham FC	9	(0)
2023–	Chicago Stars	74	(1)

International career
2014	United States U18		
- * Club domestic league appearances and goals as of 05:39, November 2, 2026 (UTC)

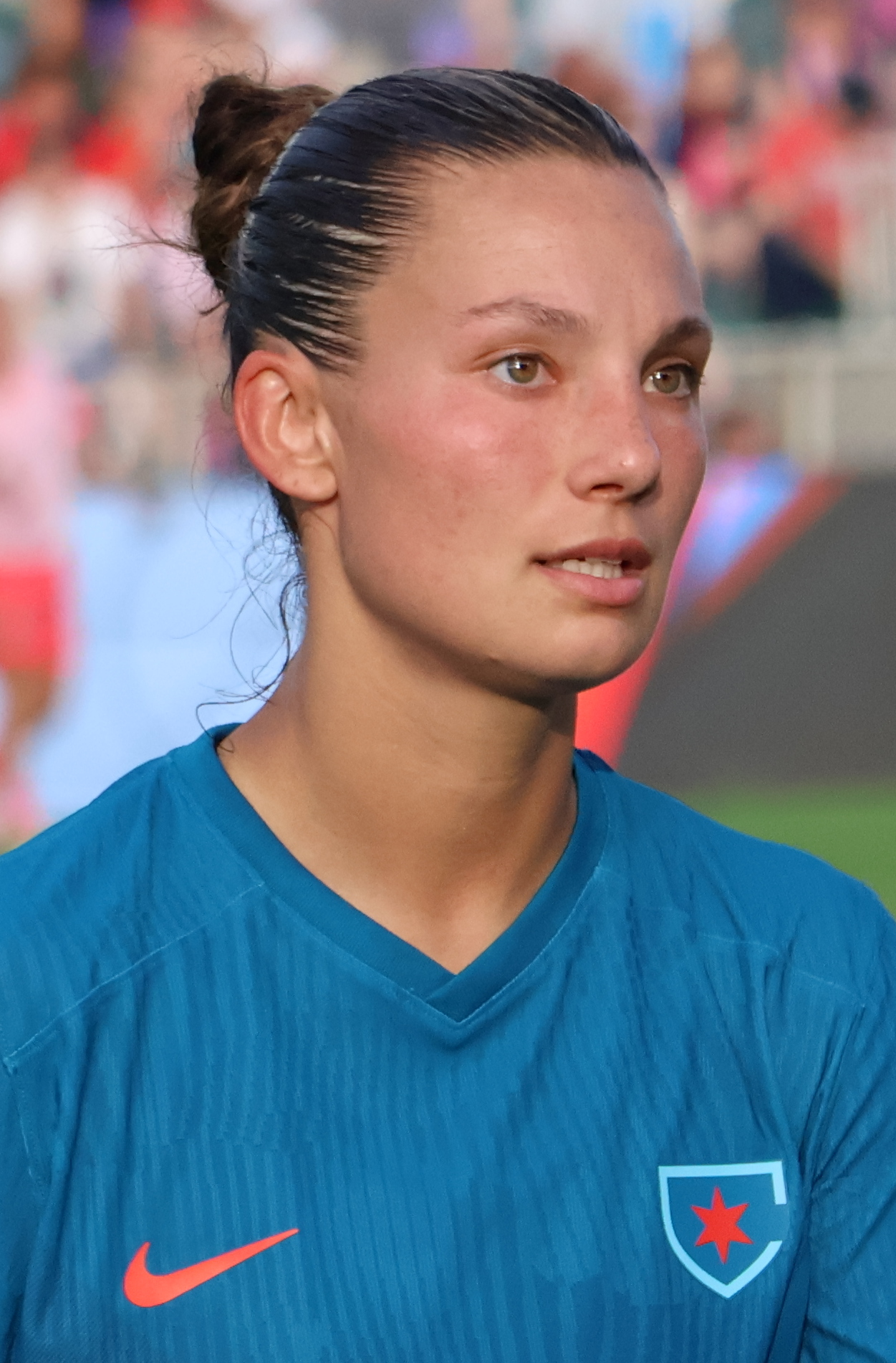
Bike with the Chicago Red Stars in 2024

Jenna Elizabeth Bike (born May 18, 1998) is an American professional soccer player who plays as a winger or right back for Chicago Stars FC of the National Women's Soccer League (NWSL). She played college soccer for the Boston College Eagles before starting her professional career with NJ/NY Gotham FC.

== Early life ==
Bike is a native of Trumbull, Connecticut, where she played youth club soccer. Bike attended St. Joseph High School, where she played girls' soccer for the St. Joseph High Cadets. In her sophomore season in 2013, Bike scored 40 goals and was credited with 35 assists, and the Cadets reached and won the Connecticut state championship match. In her senior season, Bike scored 25 goals, and the Cadets won the Class L state championship again with a 22–1 record. She scored a goal and was credited with an assist in the Cadets' 2–0 Class L finals match victory against Suffield High School, completing her high school career with 79 goals and 45 assists, both school records.

Bike was named National Soccer Coaches Association of America national high school player of the year on December 8, 2015, and a Gatorade Connecticut Player of the Year twice. In November 2022, Bike was inducted into the Connecticut Girls' Soccer Coaches' Association Hall of Fame.

== College career ==
In 2016, Bike began playing NCAA Division I women's soccer for the Boston College Eagles as a forward. She participated in 57 games across her first three years of college before suffering an injury that kept her from playing her senior season in 2019. Her subsequent 13 months of rehabilitation coincided with the COVID-19 pandemic. Bike graduated from Boston College's nursing program in 2020 and registered for the 2020 NWSL College Draft, but was not selected and returned to Boston College for two graduate seasons of play while pursuing a master's degree, then a doctorate degree, in nursing practice. She also worked at Boston College as a nurse. Bike captained the team in both of her remaining two seasons.

By the end of her career with the Eagles in 2021, Bike made 89 appearances, 88 of them starts, and played a total of 6,461 minutes. She scored 18 goals and was credited with 15 assists.

== Club career ==
=== NJ/NY Gotham FC ===
In 2022, NWSL club NJ/NY Gotham FC invited Bike to its open tryouts, and she stepped away from her doctorate program to pursue a professional career. Bike was later named as a non-roster invitee on Gotham FC's official 2022 preseason roster. On June 27, 2022, Bike signed her first professional deal, a national team replacement contract player, with Gotham.

Bike then changed positions from forward to right back, where she received training expertise from goalkeeper Michelle Betos and center back Ali Krieger, both of whom had also joined Gotham that season. Bike debuted for Gotham on June 2, 2022, against the Chicago Red Stars. On August 5, 2022, days after the expiration of her NTR contract, she signed a full contract with Gotham FC in August 2022. Gotham waived Bike in November 2022.

=== Chicago Stars ===
In January 2023, Chicago coach Chris Petrucelli contacted Bike about the team's need for a winger. The team subsequently signed Bike from the NWSL waiver wire to a two-year contract with an option for a third year, where she returned to playing as a forward. She scored her first goal on May 12, 2024 against Utah.

== International career ==
Bike attended United States women's national under-18 soccer team training camp in 2015.

== Personal life ==
Bike has two younger sisters, Julia and Tory, both of whom play soccer.
