= Leilanni Nesbeth =

Bermudian footballer (born 2001)

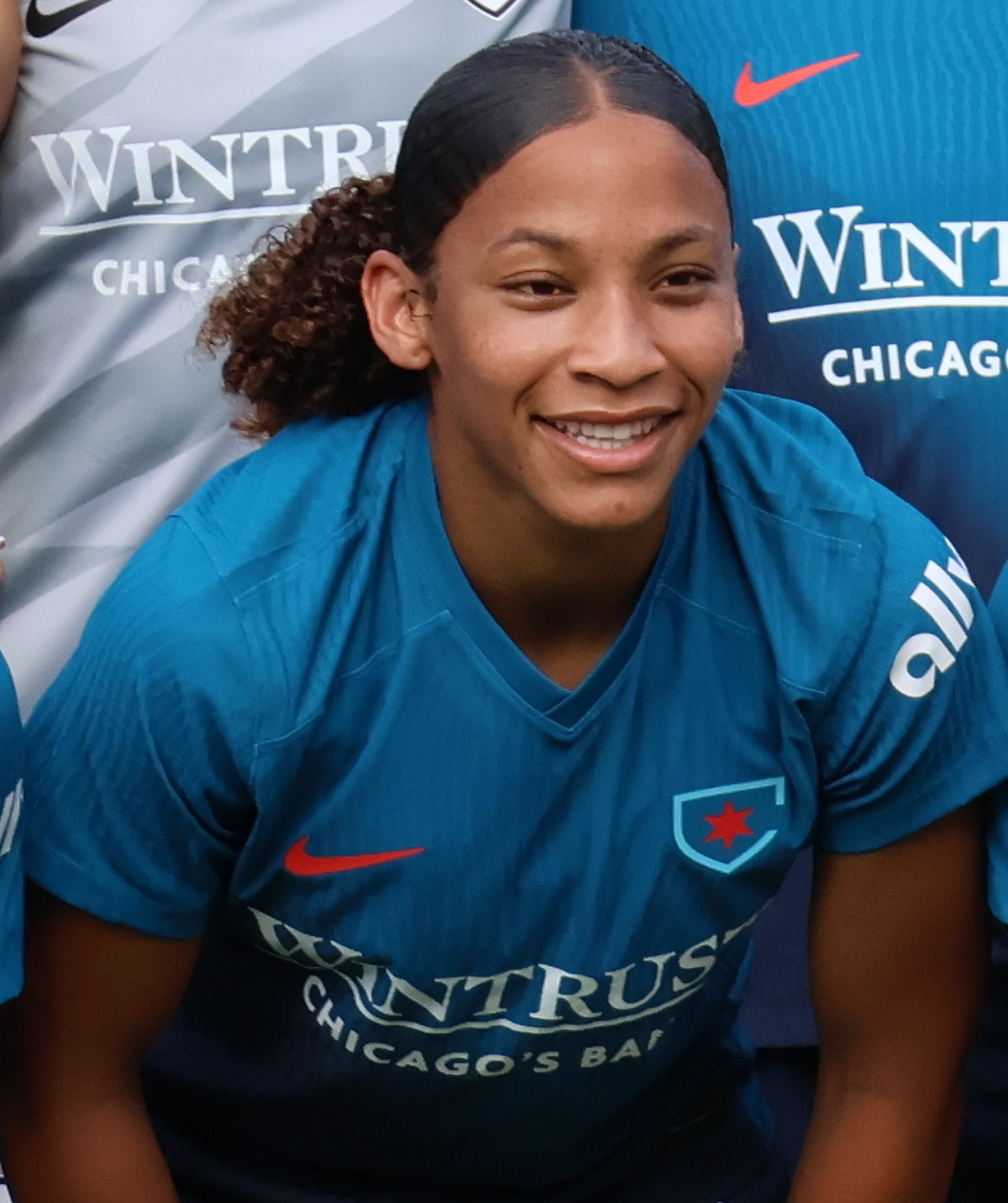
- Nesbeth with the Chicago Red Stars in 2024

Personal information
- Full name: Leilanni Iris Nicole Nesbeth
- Date of birth: 17 July 2001 (age 25)
- Height: 1.63 m (5 ft 4 in)
- Position: Midfielder

Team information
- Current team: Como

College career
| Years | Team | Apps | (Gls) |
| 2019–2023 | Florida State Seminoles | 96 | (15) |

Senior career*
| Years | Team | Apps | (Gls) |
| 2018 | Brighton & Hove Albion | 1 | (0) |
| 2024–2026 | Chicago Stars | 33 | (1) |
| 2026– | Como | 0 | (0) |

International career^{‡}
| 2018 | Bermuda U17 | 3 | (1) |
| 2020 | Bermuda U20 | 1 | (0) |
| 2022– | Bermuda | 4 | (5) |
- * Club domestic league appearances and goals as of 30 June 2026 ‡ National team caps and goals as of 23 February 2022

Leilanni Iris Nicole Nesbeth (born 17 July 2001) is a Bermudian professional footballer who plays as a midfielder for Serie A Women club Como and the Bermuda national team. She played college soccer for the Florida State Seminoles before being selected by the Chicago Red Stars tenth overall in the 2024 NWSL Draft.

== Early life and college career ==
Nesbeth was raised in St. David's Island, Bermuda. She attended Bede's Senior School in England. Nesbeth attended Florida State University in the United States, where she played as a forward and midfielder. She won two NCAA championships with the Seminoles (2021 and 2023) and was twice named to the All-ACC second team.

== Club career ==
Nesbeth played for Brighton & Hove Albion in England in 2017–18. She was drafted tenth overall by the Chicago Red Stars (later named Chicago Stars FC) in the 2024 NWSL Draft and signed a three-year contract with the club in 2024. On June 30, 2026, after spending two-and-a-half seasons in Chicago, Nesbeth departed from the club on a mutual contract termination.

On 25 July 2026, Nesbeth signed a two-year contract with Italian club Como.

== International career ==
Nesbeth represented Bermuda at the 2018 CONCACAF Women's U-17 Championship and the 2020 CONCACAF Women's U-20 Championship. She capped at senior level during the 2022 CONCACAF W Championship qualification.

== Honours ==
Florida State Seminoles

- NCAA Division I women's soccer tournament: 2021, 2023

== See also ==
- List of Bermuda women's international footballers
