= Nádia Gomes =

Portuguese footballer (born 1996)

- Gomes with the Chicago Red Stars in 2026

Personal information
- Full name: Nádia Filipa Gomes Coelho
- Date of birth: 9 November 1996 (age 29)
- Place of birth: Viseu, Portugal
- Height: 1.64 m (5 ft 5 in)
- Positions: Forward; left-back

Team information
- Current team: Chicago Stars
- Number: 11

College career
Years	Team	Apps	(Gls)
2014–2017	BYU Cougars	83	(23)

Senior career*
Years	Team	Apps	(Gls)
2018	Orlando Pride	0	(0)
2023	San Francisco Glens	15	(17)
2024–	Chicago Stars	46	(4)

International career^{‡}
2013–2014	Portugal U-19	8	(2)
2018–	Portugal	2	(1)
- * Club domestic league appearances and goals as of 05:40, 2 November 2026 (UTC) ‡ National team caps and goals as of 20 June 2025

Nádia Filipa Gomes Coelho (born 9 November 1996) is a Portuguese professional footballer who plays as a forward or left-back for National Women's Soccer League club Chicago Stars FC and the Portugal national team. She also holds American citizenship.

== College career ==
Gomes played for Brigham Young University from 2014 to 2017. As a freshman, she made 21 appearances and finished the season with three goals and three assists. During her second year, she scored nine goals, including five game-winners, and recorded four assists. She was named WCC Player of the Year and selected to the NSCAA All-America third team. As a junior, she was named to the preseason watch list for the Hermann Trophy and finished the season with six goals and twelve assists. As a senior, she started in all 19 matches and was tied second on the team in goals with five and assists with four.

== Club career ==
Gomes with the Chicago Stars in 2026

=== Orlando Pride, 2018 ===
On 18 January 2018, Gomes was selected by Orlando Pride as the 23rd overall draft pick at the 2018 NWSL College Draft. She did not make the final roster selection for the 2018 season. On 30 March, she was signed by the Pride to a short-term contract as a National Team Replacement Player, as Orlando had several players away on International duty.

After not being offered a permanent contract with the Pride, Gomes returned to BYU to complete her college degree. Vlatko Andonovski, then manager of OL Reign, offered Gomes a tryout, but Gomes turned it down upon learning that she was pregnant and stepped away from football.

=== San Francisco Glens, 2023 ===
After five years away from club football, Gomes signed with San Francisco Glens SC for the 2023 USL W League season. Gomes became the team captain as the Glens won both the NorCal Division and Western Conference Championship, with their magical run ending in the National Semifinal. Her 17 goals and 10 assists paced San Francisco as she was named National Player of the Year and NorCal Division Player of the Year by the USL. She was also selected for the W League Team of the Year.

=== Chicago Stars, 2024– ===
On 7 March 2024, the Chicago Red Stars (later named Chicago Stars FC) announced that they had signed Gomes to a one-year contract with a one-year option. She made her first start in the season opener, a 2-1 win over Seattle Reign FC.

== International career ==
Gomes represented Portugal at the 2014 UEFA Women's Under-19 Championship, where she started five of her six appearances and scored two goals as a defender. In February 2018, she was named to Portugal's 2018 Algarve Cup squad. On 2 March 2018, she made her debut in 0–0 draw with Australia. On 7 March 2018, she scored her first goal in a 2–1 win over Australia as Portugal earned its first third-place finish in the tournament.

On 15 September 2023, following her impressive comeback with the San Francisco Glens in the USL W League after five years away from the sport, Gomes was called up to Portugal's roster for the team's UEFA Women's Nations League group stage games against France and Norway.

== Honours ==
Portugal

- Algarve Cup (third place): 2018

BYU

- West Coast Conference Regular Season Champion: 2014, 2015, 2016

San Francisco Glens SC

- USL W League NorCal Division Champion: 2023
- USL W League Western Conference Champion: 2023

Individual

- West Coast Conference Player of the Year: 2015
- NSCAA Third Team All-American: 2015
- USL W League National Player of the Year: 2023
- USL W League NorCal Division Player of the Year: 2023
- USL W League Team of the Year: 2023
