= Lorne Donaldson =

Jamaican football player and manager

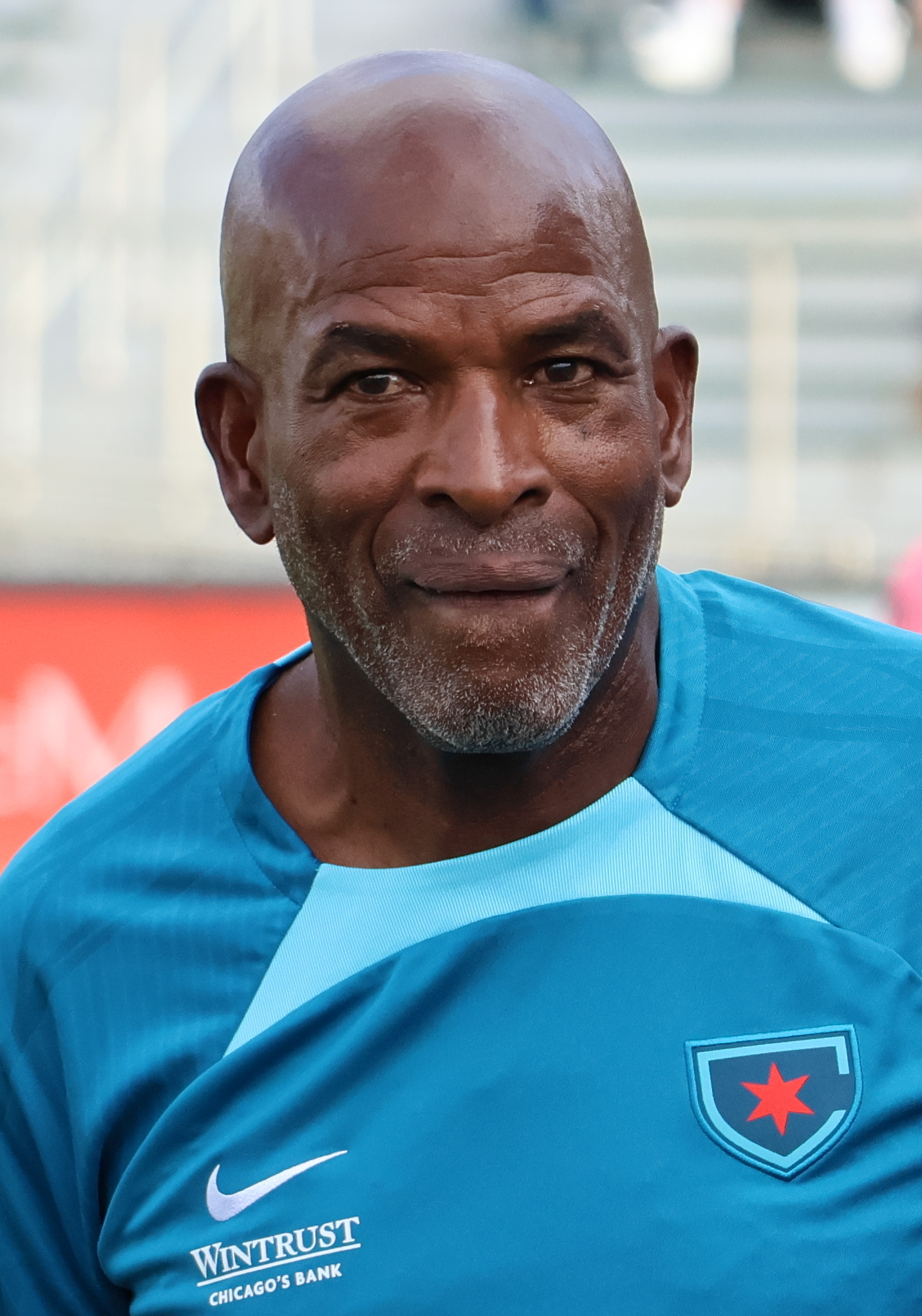
- Donaldson with the Chicago Red Stars in 2024

Personal information
- Full name: Lorne Garfield Donaldson
- Date of birth: 1954 or 1955 (age 70–71)
- Place of birth: Jamaica

College career
Years	Team	Apps	(Gls)
1980–1982	Metro State Roadrunners		

Senior career*
Years	Team	Apps	(Gls)
1979	Cavalier		
- Denver Kickers
1997	Colorado Foxes	1	(0)

Managerial career
- 1983–1985: Metro State Roadrunners (assistant)
- Colorado Foxes
- 2001: Colorado Rapids (assistant)
- Real Colorado Foxes
- 2019: Jamaica Women (assistant)
- 2022–2023: Jamaica Women
- 2023–2025: Chicago Stars FC
- * Club domestic league appearances and goals

Lorne Garfield Donaldson is a Jamaican football manager and former player who was most recently the head coach of Chicago Stars FC of the National Women's Soccer League (NWSL).

== Playing career ==
Donaldson attended and played soccer at Kingston College in Jamaica. He also played for Cavalier F.C. in 1980, Donaldson entered Metropolitan State University of Denver. He was a 1981 NAIA First Team All American soccer player. In 1995, MSU Denver inducted Donaldson into its Hall of Fame. Donaldson also played for the Denver Kickers when they won the 1983 National Amateur Cup. In 1997, he played one game for the Colorado Foxes.

== Coaching career ==
Following the completion of his playing career at MSU Denver, Donaldson continued as an assistant coach with the men's soccer team while finishing his degree. He served as an assistant coach with the Colorado Foxes before becoming the head coach. He was the 1996 American Professional Soccer League Coach of the Year. In 1997, he became a coach with the Douglas County Soccer Association. The Douglas County Soccer Association runs the Real Colorado Foxes, a team Donaldson coaches. On 29 January 2001, Donaldson became an assistant coach with the Colorado Rapids of Major League Soccer.

In June 2022, Donaldson was named Head Coach of Jamaica Women women's football team. In July 2023, Donaldson lead Jamaica's "Reggae Girlz" to their second consecutive World Cup.

The Jamaica Football Federation, said after a conversation with Lorne Donaldson, whose contract as head coach of the Reggae Girlz runs out on 30 September 2023, there will not be a renewal. After guiding the Reggae Girlz to a second successive World Cup appearance and a historic berth in the round of 16 this summer, the veteran coach, made it clear that he had not had contract renewal talks with the federation and that the chance of him continuing seemed slim. The JFF and Donaldson met to discuss his contract and after an extended discussion, both parties agreed not to renew the contract.

On 20 December 2023, the Chicago Red Stars (later renamed Chicago Stars FC) announced Donaldson as their new head coach. He led 2023's bottom-of-the-table team to the 2024 playoffs in his first season. After getting just one win from six games to start the 2025 season, Chicago fired Donaldson on 30 April 2025.
