= Jameese Joseph =

American soccer player (born 2002)

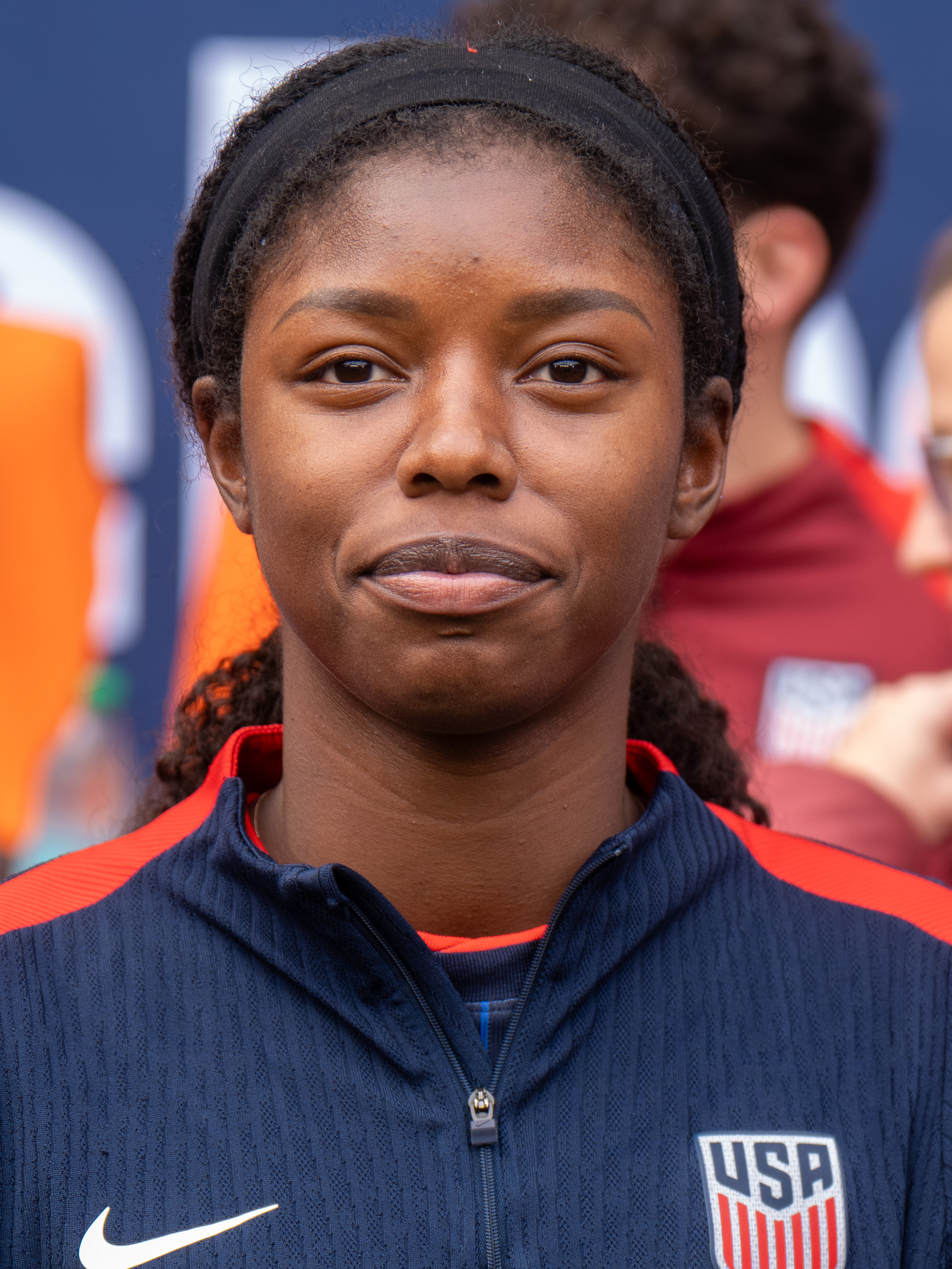
- Joseph with the United States in 2026

Personal information
- Full name: Jameese Joseph
- Date of birth: May 3, 2002 (age 24)
- Place of birth: Beltsville, Maryland, U.S.
- Height: 5 ft 7 in (1.70 m)
- Position: Forward

Team information
- Current team: Utah Royals
- Number: 3

College career
Years	Team	Apps	(Gls)
2019–2023	NC State Wolfpack	87	(24)

Senior career*
Years	Team	Apps	(Gls)
2024–2026	Chicago Stars	63	(7)
2026–	Utah Royals	7	(0)

International career^{‡}
2025–	United States	5	(1)
- * Club domestic league appearances and goals as of 04:20, November 10, 2026 (UTC) ‡ National team caps and goals as of April 14, 2026

Jameese Joseph (born May 3, 2002) is an American professional soccer player who plays as a forward for the Utah Royals of the National Women's Soccer League (NWSL). She played college soccer for the NC State Wolfpack before being selected by the Chicago Red Stars in the 2024 NWSL Draft.

== College career ==
Joseph played as a forward for North Carolina State University from 2019 to 2023. In her freshman year, she was the only freshman on the team to start all 23 matches. She earned Atlantic Coast Conference (ACC) All-Freshman and United Soccer Coaches Third Team All-Region honors. Joseph completed her college career with 24 goals and 10 assists.

== Club career ==
Jameese Joseph with the Utah Royals in 2026

Joseph was selected by the Chicago Red Stars (later named Chicago Stars FC) of the National Women's Soccer League (NWSL) as the 15th pick of the 2024 NWSL Draft. The Red Stars signed her to a three-year contract through the 2026 NWSL season on March 8, 2024. In August 2024, Joseph won the NWSL Goal of the Week award after netting her second career goal in a match against Racing Louisville FC.

On September 7, 2026, Joseph was traded to the Utah Royals in exchange for $750,000 with additional fees that could reach up to $840,000 of intra-league transfer funds.

== International career ==
Joseph was called up for the U14 United States Women's Youth National Team training camp in Carson, California.

In 2022, she was called up to the U20 U.S. Women's Youth National Team camp in Chula Vista, California, ahead of two friendly matches against Costa Rica. She played for the United States for the first time in an international competition against Costa Rica, where the USA won 3-0 on May 15, 2022. Joseph got the start in the second game versus Costa Rica on May 18, 2022, and the USA won 5-0.

Joseph was called up by Emma Hayes into Futures Camp, practicing alongside the senior national team, in January 2025. On November 28, 2025, Joseph made her senior international debut in a 3–0 victory over Italy.

== Career statistics ==
=== International ===
As of match played April 14, 2026

National Team	Year	Apps	Goals
United States	2025	1	0
United States	2026	4	1
Total		5	1

List of international goals scored by Jameese Joseph
No.	Date	Venue	Opponent	Score	Result	Competition	Ref.
1	January 27, 2026	Santa Barbara, California, United States	Chile	2–0	5–0	Friendly	

== Honors ==
United States

- SheBelieves Cup: 2026
