= Karina Báez =

Mexican football manager

Personal information
- Full name: Karina Paola Báez Trujillo
- Date of birth: 7 November 1984 (age 41)
- Place of birth: Miguel Hidalgo, Mexico
- Height: 1.67 m (5 ft 6 in)

Team information
- Current team: Chicago Stars (interim head coach)

Managerial career
- Years: Team
- 2018–2019: Pachuca (assistant)
- 2019–2021: UANL (assistant)
- 2021–2022: UNAM (women)
- 2024–2026: Chicago Stars (assistant)
- 2026–: Chicago Stars (interim)

Karina Paola Báez Trujillo (born 7 November 1984) is a Mexican football manager. She is currently the interim head coach for Chicago Stars FC of the National Women's Soccer League (NWSL).

== Career ==
In 2018, Báez assistant was put in charge as one of the assistant coaches for Pachuca.

In 2019, Báez became the assistant coach for UANL.

In 2021, Báez was named the head coach of Club Universidad Nacional. Báez was sacked 20 October 2022.

On August 12, 2026, Báez was named the interim head coach of NWSL club Chicago Stars FC after having previously served as an assistant coach for the club since 2024.
