= Mackenzie Wood =

American soccer player (born 2000)

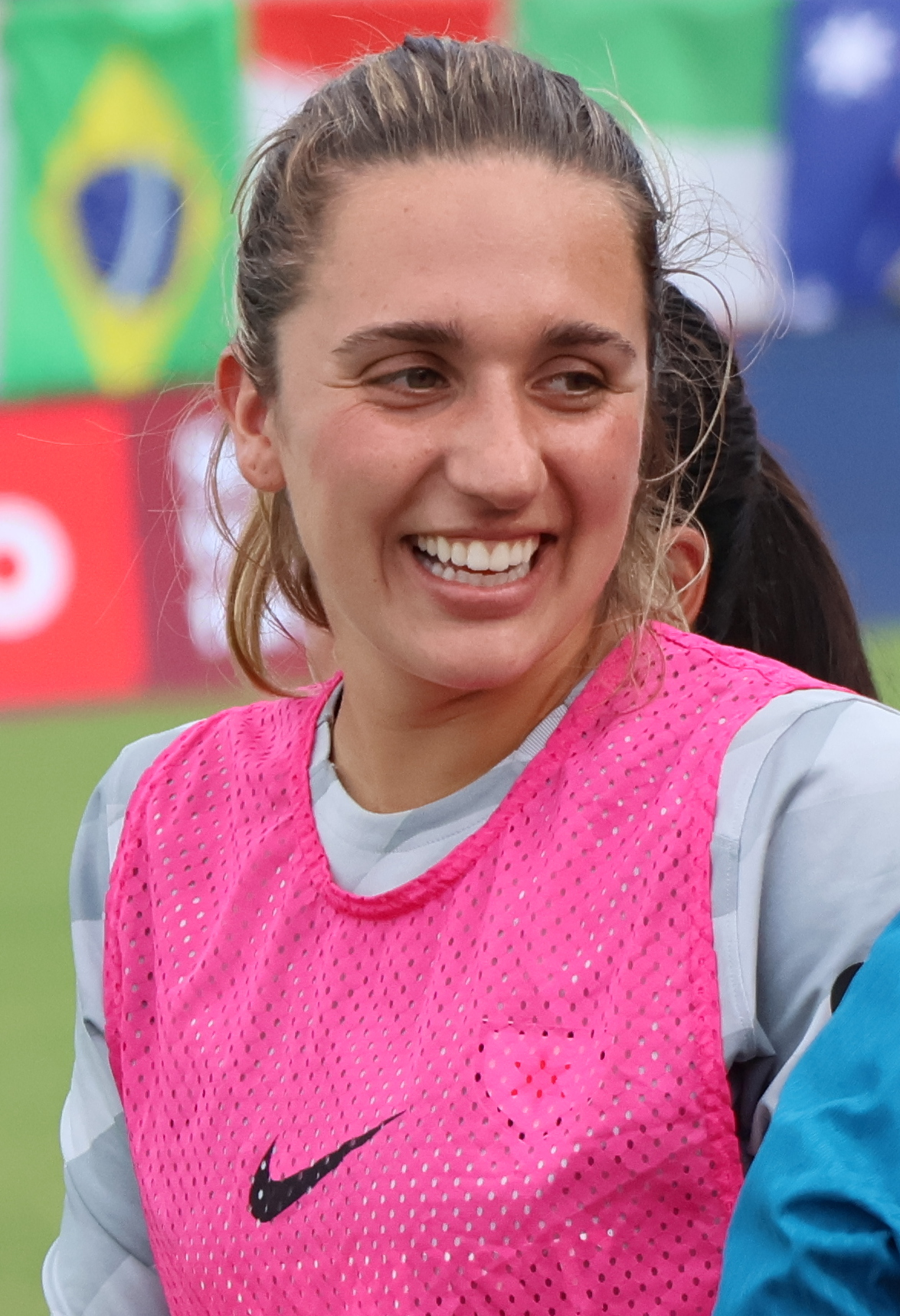
- Wood with the Chicago Red Stars in 2024

Personal information
- Full name: Mackenzie Kay Wood
- Date of birth: July 4, 2000 (age 26)
- Height: 5 ft 9 in (1.75 m)
- Position: Goalkeeper

Team information
- Current team: Portland Thorns (on loan from the Chicago Stars)
- Number: 28

College career
Years	Team	Apps	(Gls)
2018–2021	Northwestern Wildcats	67	(0)
2022	Notre Dame Fighting Irish	18	(0)

Senior career*
Years	Team	Apps	(Gls)
2023–	Chicago Stars	3	(0)
2023–2024	→ Reims (loan)	0	(0)
2026–	→ Portland Thorns (loan)	0	(0)
- * Club domestic league appearances and goals as of May 1, 2024

Mackenzie Kay Wood (born July 4, 2000) is an American professional soccer player who plays as a goalkeeper for Portland Thorns FC of the National Women's Soccer League (NWSL), on loan from Chicago Stars FC. She played college soccer for the Northwestern Wildcats and the Notre Dame Fighting Irish.

== Early life ==
Wood was raised in Granger, Indiana, near South Bend, the daughter of Matt and Kiley Wood. She captained her Indiana Fire club team and her team at Penn High School. She helped her school team reach the state final as a sophomore in 2015, but finished runners-up. In her senior year in 2017, she posted 20 clean sheets as her school team became undefeated state champions and was recognized as an All-American by TopDrawerSoccer. While in high school, she was called into national training camps with the United States under-16 and under-18 teams in 2016 and 2017.

== College career ==
=== Northwestern Wildcats ===
Wood was the starting goalkeeper for the Northwestern Wildcats beginning as a freshman. In the 2018 season, she led the Big Ten Conference with 0.650 goals against average and recorded eight shutouts in nineteen games, being named to the Big Ten all-freshman team and Northwestern's most valuable player. She started all 67 games for the Wildcats over four years. Outside of the 2020 season shortened by the COVID-19 pandemic, she posted more than 70 saves in three seasons. She graduated with degrees in statistics and communication studies.

=== Notre Dame Fighting Irish ===
Wood then entered the transfer portal and joined the Notre Dame Fighting Irish for her fifth season of eligibility due to the COVID-19 pandemic. In the 2022 regular season, she allowed only five goals in twelve games, including nine clean sheets, to help the Fighting Irish place third in the Atlantic Coast Conference (ACC). She led the ACC with a career-best 0.600 goals against average and had a career-high ten shutouts, receiving third-team All-ACC honors. She helped Notre Dame hold its first three opponents in the NCAA tournament scoreless before falling in the quarterfinals. She earned her master's degree in sports analytics and studied for another master's in data science.

== Club career ==
Wood joined the Chicago Red Stars (later named Chicago Stars FC) as a non-roster trialist in the 2023 preseason. On March 25, she signed with the Stars on an injury replacement contract, making her professional debut two weeks later in the club's friendly against the Mexico national team on April 8. On August 30, she signed a new three-year contract, with the option to extend for another year, and was sent on a season-long loan to Division 1 Féminine club Reims. There she was the second-choice goalkeeper behind Kinga Szemik, earning two starts in the Coupe de France Féminine in January 2024.

Wood was recalled to Chicago during the NWSL preseason in February 2024. On May 13, she made her NWSL debut as a 62nd-minute substitute for an injured Alyssa Naeher in a 3–1 win over the Utah Royals. The following two weeks, she made her first NWSL starts in losses to NJ/NY Gotham FC and Racing Louisville FC. She also made two appearances in the NWSL x Liga MX Femenil Summer Cup.

In May 2025, Wood picked up an injury and was placed on the 45-day injury list. The following month, she re-signed with the Stars on a contract through 2027.

In March 2026, Wood joined the Portland Thorns on a season-long loan.
