= 2024 Chicago Red Stars season =

Chicago Red Stars 2024 soccer season

Chicago Red Stars
2024 season
- Majority owner: Laura Ricketts
- General manager: Richard Feuz
- Head coach: Lorne Donaldson
- Stadium: SeatGeek Stadium (capacity: 20,000)
- League: 8th
- NWSL x Liga MX Femenil Summer Cup: Group stage
- Playoffs: Quarterfinals
- Top goalscorer: Mallory Swanson (7)
- Highest home attendance: 35,038 (Jun 8 at Wrigley Field vs. BAY)
- Lowest home attendance: 2,999 (May 1 vs. WAS)
- Average home league attendance: 7,156
- Biggest win: 3–0 (Jun 28 at SD)
- Biggest defeat: League: 2 goals (8 times); All: 4–1 (Nov 8 vs ORL, playoffs)
Home colors	Away colors
- All statistics correct as of November 7, 2024.

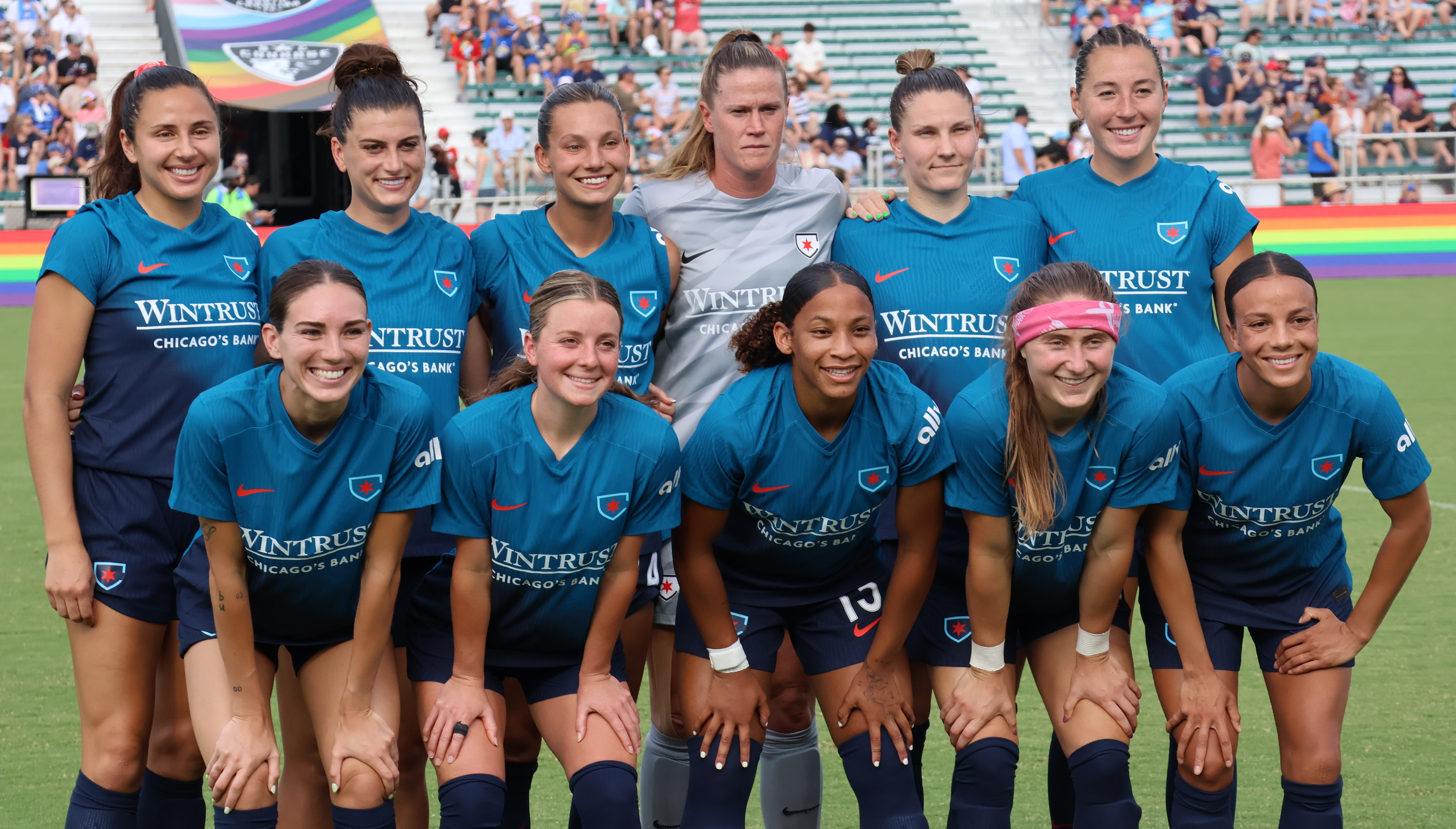
Week 14 starting lineup: Staab, Roccaro, Bike, Naeher, Kuikka, Anderson Milazzo, Griffith, Nesbeth, Schlegel, Swanson

The 2024 Chicago Red Stars season was the team's sixteenth as a professional women's soccer team, and eleventh in the National Women's Soccer League (NWSL), the top tier of women's soccer in the United States. The Red Stars finished the season in eighth place, qualifying for the NWSL playoffs, where they were eliminated in the quarterfinals by the top-seeded Orlando Pride.

== Background ==
=== Hirings ===
On December 20, 2023, the Red Stars hired former Jamaica women's national football team head coach Lorne Donaldson to be the club's head coach.

On February 5, 2024, the Red Stars hired Servette FC chief executive officer Richard Feuz to be the club's general manager.

=== Kit changes ===
NWSL apparel sponsor Nike redesigned all of the league's home and away kits for the 2024 season. The Chicago Red Stars primary kits were a patchwork of striped blue and white patterns emanating from the club's secondary crest with its traditional four six-pointed stars on its lower front corner. The club's secondary kits consisted of diagonally divided fields of dark and darker blue. The club's front-of-shirt sponsor was Wintrust Financial.

== Stadium and facilities ==
The Red Stars continued to play in SeatGeek Stadium, their full-time home since the team's 2016 season.

== Team ==
=== Staff ===
As of October 20, 2024.

style="text-align:left"|Front office
President	Karen Leetzow
Director of operations	Michelle Henstock

style="text-align:left"|Soccer operations
General manager	Richard Feuz
Assistant general manager	Babett Peter
Head coach	Lorne Donaldson
First assistant coach	Masaki Hemmi
Assistant coach, development	Ella Masar
Assistant coach, goalkeeping	Brenton Saylor
Assistant coach, analytics	Karina Báez
Soccer operations manager	Victoria Buonanni

style="text-align:left"|Performance staff
Director of high performance and medical	Ellie Somers
Head of performance	Jimmy Haley
Head athletic trainer	Shayna Lewis
Chief medical officer	Dr. Joshua Blomgren

=== Players ===
As of September 18, 2024.

No.	Pos.	Player	Nation
1	GK	USA	Alyssa Naeher (captain)
3	DF	USA	Sam Staab
4	MF	USA	Cari Roccaro
5	MF	BRA	Julia Bianchi
7	FW	USA	Ava Cook
8	FW	USA	Jameese Joseph
9	FW	USA	Mallory Swanson
10	MF	USA	Shea Groom
11	MF	USA	Chardonnay Curran
12	DF	FIN	Natalia Kuikka
13	MF	BER	Leilanni Nesbeth
14	FW	BRA	Ludmila
15	FW	USA	Sarah Griffith
16	MF	USA	Sophie Jones
19	GK	USA	Mackenzie Wood
20	MF	USA	Bea Franklin
21	MF	CAN	Julia Grosso
23	DF	USA	Tatumn Milazzo
24	FW	USA	Jenna Bike
26	FW	POR	Nádia Gomes
28	DF	GER	Maximiliane Rall
30	DF	USA	Camryn Biegalski
32	DF	USA	Taylor Malham
33	FW	USA	Ally Cook
34	FW	USA	Ally Schlegel
37	GK	JAM	Sydney Schneider
41	DF	USA	Hannah Anderson

== Competitions ==
Win Draw Loss

=== Regular season ===
==== Matches ====
March 16, 2024 1	Utah Royals	0–2	Chicago Red Stars	Sandy, Utah
5:30 p.m. MDT (UTC−6)	Nyberg (yellow card) 62'	Report	Sentnor (yellow card) 44'; Schlegel 50'; Hocking (yellow card) 60'; Cook 77' (yellow card) 97'	Stadium: America First Field; Attendance: 20,370; Referee: Gerald Flores

March 23, 2024 2	Chicago Red Stars	2–1	Seattle Reign FC	Bridgeview, Illinois
3:00 p.m. CDT (UTC−5)	Kuikka (yellow card) 28'; Bianchi 42'; Rall 68'	Report	Ji 63'; McClernon (yellow card) 85'	Stadium: SeatGeek Stadium; Attendance: 5,494; Referee: Rebecca Pagan

March 29, 2024 3	Orlando Pride	1–1	Chicago Red Stars	Orlando, Florida
7:00 p.m. EDT (UTC−4)	Malham 21' (o.g.); Martinez (yellow card) 46'; Luana (yellow card) 71'; Marta (yellow card) 90'	Report	Roccaro (yellow card) 36'; Bianchi (yellow card) 42'; Swanson 64'; Staab (yellow card) 95'	Stadium: Inter&Co Stadium; Attendance: 5,586; Referee: Anya Voigt

April 13, 2024 4	Chicago Red Stars	0–1	Angel City FC	Bridgeview, Illinois
8:30 p.m. CDT (UTC−5)	Bike (yellow card) 39'	Report	Spencer (yellow card) 35'; Rall 40' (o.g.); Reid (yellow card) 46'; Johnson (yellow card) 93'	Stadium: SeatGeek Stadium; Attendance: 3,168; Referee: Adam Kilpatrick

April 21, 2024 5	Seattle Reign FC	1–2	Chicago Red Stars	Seattle, Washington
3:00 p.m. PDT (UTC−7)	King 79'	Report	Schlegel 4'; Swanson 31'; Hocking (yellow card) 53'; Huerta (yellow card) 66'; Bianchi (yellow card) 96'	Stadium: Lumen Field; Attendance: 9,626; Referee: Elton Garcia

April 27, 2024 6	Chicago Red Stars	0–2	Portland Thorns FC	Bridgeview, Illinois
6:30 p.m. CDT (UTC−5)	Staab (yellow card) 62'	Report	Smith 10', 26' (yellow card) 71'; Reyes (yellow card) 83'; Obaze (yellow card) 90+8'	Stadium: SeatGeek Stadium; Attendance: 4,544; Referee: Thomas Snyder

May 1, 2024 7	Chicago Red Stars	2–4	Washington Spirit	Bridgeview, Illinois
7:00 p.m. CDT (UTC−5)	Roccaro (yellow card) 53'; Schlegel 79'; Nesbeth 90+2'	Report	Rodman 28' (yellow card) 58'; Sarr 30'; Butel (yellow card) 45'; Ratcliffe 83', 86'	Stadium: SeatGeek Stadium; Attendance: 2,999; Referee: Alex Billeter

May 5, 2024 8	Bay FC	1–2	Chicago Red Stars	San Jose, California
5:00 p.m. PDT (UTC−7)	Boade 8'; Sharples (yellow card) 79'	Report	Hocking 30' (yellow card) 61'; Schlegel 63'	Stadium: PayPal Park; Attendance: 14,317; Referee: Elijio Arreguin

May 12, 2024 9	Chicago Red Stars	3–1	Utah Royals	Bridgeview, Illinois
4:30 p.m. CDT (UTC−5)	Bike 23'; Swanson 29' (pen.); Hocking 90+7'	Report	Cluff (yellow card) 33'; Henry (yellow card) 47'; Tucker 81'	Stadium: SeatGeek Stadium; Attendance: 3,104; Referee: Alyssa Nichols

May 19, 2024 10	NJ/NY Gotham FC	2–1	Chicago Red Stars	Harrison, New Jersey
5:00 p.m. EDT (UTC−4)	Sheehan (yellow card) 27'; Williams 57' (yellow card) 90+7'; Stevens 90'	Report	Bike (yellow card) 28'; Hocking 74'	Stadium: Red Bull Arena; Attendance: 8,996; Referee: Katja Koroleva

May 25, 2024 11	Chicago Red Stars	0–1	Racing Louisville FC	Bridgeview, Illinois
6:30 p.m. CDT (UTC−5)	Milazzo (yellow card) 34'; Nesbeth (yellow card) 39'; Hocking (yellow card) 49'	Report	Wright (yellow card) 24'; Sears 26'; Fischer (yellow card) 58'	Stadium: SeatGeek Stadium; Attendance: 3,872; Referee: Rebecca Pagan

June 8, 2024 12	Chicago Red Stars	1–2	Bay FC	Chicago, Illinois
5:00 p.m. CDT (UTC−5)	Malham (yellow card) 17'; Hocking 90+3'	Report	Picket 25'; Anderson 79'	Stadium: Wrigley Field; Attendance: 35,038; Referee: Alex Billeter
Note: Set all-time record for attendance to an NWSL match.

June 14, 2024 13	Kansas City Current	2–2	Chicago Red Stars	Kansas City, Missouri
7:00 p.m. CDT (UTC−5)	Bia 51'; Chawinga 58'; Mace (yellow card) 72'	Report	Swanson 6'; Staab 90'; Curran (yellow card) 90+3'	Stadium: CPKC Stadium; Attendance: 11,500; Referee: Gerald Flores

June 23, 2024 14	North Carolina Courage	3–1	Chicago Red Stars	Cary, North Carolina
6:00 p.m. CDT (UTC−4)	Lussi 16'; Sanchez 51'; Miura (yellow card) 66'; Speck 81'; O'Sullivan (yellow card) 84'; St-Georges (yellow card) 90+7'	Report	Swanson 12'; Roccaro (yellow card) 90+2'	Stadium: WakeMed Soccer Park; Attendance: 5,256; Referee: Laura Rodriguez

June 28, 2024 15	San Diego Wave FC	0–3	Chicago Red Stars	San Diego, California
7:00 p.m. PDT (UTC−7)	McNabb (yellow card) 9'	Report	Girma 42' (o.g.); Hocking (yellow card) 45'; Swanson 67'; Joseph 69'; Staab (yellow card) 73'	Stadium: Snapdragon Stadium; Attendance: 24,115; Referee: Shawn Tehini

July 6, 2024 16	Chicago Red Stars	1–0	Houston Dash	Bridgeview, Illinois
12:00 p.m. CDT (UTC−5)	Swanson 45+1'	Report	Olivieri (yellow card) 83'	Stadium: SeatGeek Stadium; Attendance: 5,566; Referee: Abdou Ndiaye

August 24, 2024 17	Racing Louisville FC	3–1	Chicago Red Stars	Louisville, Kentucky
7:30 p.m. EDT (UTC−4)	Kanu 12'; Milliet (yellow card) 41'; DiGrande 61'; Fischer 77'; Ary (yellow card) 90+1'	Report	Anderson (yellow card) 40'; Joseph (yellow card) 56' (goal) 59'; Nesbeth (yellow card) 66'	Stadium: Lynn Family Stadium; Attendance: 6,607; Referee: Shawn Tehini

September 1, 2024 18	Angel City FC	2–1	Chicago Red Stars	Los Angeles, California
1:00 p.m. PDT (UTC−7)	A. Thompson 6'; Zelem (yellow card) 71'; Leroux 90+1'	Report	Franklin 45+10'	Stadium: BMO Stadium; Attendance: 18,159; Referee: JC Griggs

September 8, 2024 19	Chicago Red Stars	0–1	Orlando Pride	Bridgeview, Illinois
5:00 p.m. CDT (UTC−5)	Bike (yellow card) 48'; Anderson (yellow card) 61'; Franklin (yellow card) 84'	Report	Strom (yellow card) 14'; Marta 37'; Gautrat (yellow card) 90+2'	Stadium: SeatGeek Stadium; Attendance: 7,291; Referee: Eric Tattersall

September 13, 2024 20	Portland Thorns FC	0–1	Chicago Red Stars	Portland, Oregon
7:00 p.m. PDT (UTC−7)	Reyes (yellow card) 46'; Hubly (yellow card) 79'	Report; Box	Schlegel 16'	Stadium: Providence Park; Attendance: 17,120; Referee: Elton Garcia

September 21, 2024 21	Chicago Red Stars	1–0	San Diego Wave FC	Bridgeview, Illinois
8:30 p.m. CDT (UTC−5)	Ludmila 12'; Bike (yellow card) 83'	Report	Morroni (yellow card) 16'; Sánchez (yellow card) 30'; Lundkvist (yellow card) 55'	Stadium: SeatGeek Stadium; Attendance: 5,045; Referee: Danielle Chesky

September 29, 2024 22	Chicago Red Stars	1–3	North Carolina Courage	Bridgeview, Illinois
5:00 p.m. CDT (UTC−5)	Ludmila 68'	Report	Roccaro 15' (o.g.); O'Sullivan 42'; Kerolin 65'	Stadium: SeatGeek Stadium; Attendance: 4,317; Referee: Ricardo Fierro

October 4, 2024 23	Houston Dash	0–2	Chicago Red Stars	Houston, Texas
7:00 p.m. CDT (UTC−5)	Harris (yellow card) 6'; Patterson (yellow card) 45+8'; Nielsen (yellow card) 78'	Report	Ludmila 7'; Franklin (yellow card) 17'; Schlegel 45+9' (pen.); Anderson (yellow card) 45+11'	Stadium: Shell Energy Stadium; Attendance: 5,870; Referee: Katja Koroleva

October 12, 2024 24	Chicago Red Stars	0–2	NJ/NY Gotham FC	Bridgeview, Illinois
3:00 p.m. CDT (UTC−5)	Groom (yellow card) 30'	Report; Report	Hiatt (yellow card) 61'; Sonnett (yellow card) 81'; Amorós (red card) 87'; Williams 87' (pen.); Esther 90+8'	Stadium: SeatGeek Stadium; Attendance: 6,997; Referee: Greg Dopka

October 20, 2024 25	Washington Spirit	2–0	Chicago Red Stars	Washington, D.C.
3:00 p.m. EDT (UTC−4)	Stainbrook 31' (yellow card) 90+3'; Hershfelt (yellow card) 46'; Kouassi (red card) 69'; Morris 83'	Report; Report	Ludmila (red card) 71'	Stadium: Audi Field; Attendance: 17,065; Referee: Adam Kilpatrick

November 3, 2024 26	Chicago Red Stars	1–3	Kansas City Current	Bridgeview, Illinois
2:00 p.m. CST (UTC−6)	Schlegel 52'	Report	Cooper 23'; Debinha 26'; Prince 33'; Magaia (yellow card) 81'	Stadium: SeatGeek Stadium; Attendance: 5,595; Referee: Jaclyn Metz

==== Regular season standings ====
Pos	Team	Pld	W	D	L	GF	GA	GD	Pts	Qualification
6	Portland Thorns FC	26	10	4	12	37	35	+2	34	Playoffs
7	Bay FC	26	11	1	14	31	41	−10	34	Playoffs
8	Chicago Red Stars	26	10	2	14	31	38	−7	32	Playoffs
9	Racing Louisville FC	26	7	7	12	33	39	−6	28	
10	San Diego Wave FC	26	6	7	13	24	35	−11	25	

Source: NWSL
Rules for classification: Tiebreakers

==== Results summary ====
Overall								Home						Away					
Pld	W	D	L	GF	GA	GD	Pts	W	D	L	GF	GA	GD	W	D	L	GF	GA	GD
26	10	2	14	31	38	−7	32	4	0	9	12	21	−9	6	2	5	19	17	+2

Last updated: November 3, 2024.
Source: NWSLsoccer.com

==== Results by matchday ====
Matchday	1	2	3	4	5	6	7	8	9	10	11	12	13	14	15	16	17	18	19	20	21	22	23	24	25	26
Stadium	A	H	A	H	A	H	H	A	H	A	H	H	A	A	A	H	A	A	H	A	H	H	A	H	A	H
Result	W	W	D	L	W	L	L	W	W	L	L	L	D	L	W	W	L	L	L	W	W	L	W	L	L	L
Position	2	1	2	4	3	5	5	5	5	6	6	6	7	7	7	7	7	8	7	6	6	6	6	6	6	8

Updated to match(es) played on November 3, 2024. Source: NWSL
A = Away; H = Home; W = Win; D = Draw; L = Loss

=== Playoffs ===
The Red Stars finished the regular season in 8th place and qualified for the NWSL playoffs as the lowest-seeded of eight teams.

==== Matches ====
November 9, 2024 Quarterfinals	Orlando Pride	4–1	Chicago Red Stars	Orlando, Florida
8:00 p.m. EST (UTC−5)	McCutcheon 25'; Banda 38', 45+3'; Marta 56' (pen.); Doyle (yellow card) 58'; Dyke (yellow card) 66'	Report	Joseph 59'	Stadium: Inter&Co Stadium; Attendance: 11,496; Referee: Alyssa Nichols

=== NWSL x Liga MX Femenil Summer Cup ===
The Red Stars finished second in Group D and did not advance to the tournament semifinals.

==== Group stage standings ====
Pos	Team	Pld	W	PW	PL	L	GF	GA	GD	Pts	Qualification	NYJ	CHI	WAS	GUA
1	(United States Soccer Federation) NJ/NY Gotham FC	3	2	1	0	0	4	0	+4	8	Advances to knockout stage	—	0–0	1–0	3–0
2	(United States Soccer Federation) Chicago Red Stars	3	1	0	1	1	3	3	0	4		0–0	—	3–2	0–1
3	(United States Soccer Federation) Washington Spirit	3	1	0	0	2	4	5	−1	3		0–1	2–3	—	2–1
4	(Mexican Football Federation) Guadalajara	3	1	0	0	2	2	5	−3	3		0–3	1–0	1–2	—

Source: NWSL
Rules for classification: tiebreakers

==== Group stage matches ====
July 20, 2024	Chicago Red Stars	0–0 (4–5 p)	NJ/NY Gotham FC	Bridgeview, Illinois, United States
6:00 p.m.		Report		Stadium: SeatGeek Stadium; Attendance: 2,846; Referee: Salvador Flores
	Penalties
	Schlegel (penalty scored); Anderson (penalty scored); Bike (penalty scored); Groom (penalty missed); Bianchi (penalty scored)		(penalty scored) Ryan; (penalty scored) Stevens; (penalty scored) Sheehan; (penalty scored) Stengel; (penalty scored) Edmonds

July 26, 2024	Chicago Red Stars	0–1	Guadalajara	Bridgeview, Illinois, United States
8:00 p.m.		Report	Valenzuela 45'	Stadium: SeatGeek Stadium; Attendance: 4,785; Referee: Alyssa Nichols

July 31, 2024	Washington Spirit	2–3	Chicago Red Stars	Richmond, United States
7:30 p.m.	Sullivan 55' (pen.); Silano 83'	Report	Bike 48'; Joseph 60'; Griffith 89'	Stadium: City Stadium; Referee: Melinda Homa

== Statistics ==
As of Match played November 9, 2024

=== Appearances ===
As of match played November 9, 2024; only players who have made appearances are listed.

Starting appearances are listed first, followed by substitute appearances after the + symbol where applicable.

No.	Pos	Nat	Player	Total		NWSL		Playoffs		Summer Cup	
No.	Pos	Nat	Player	Apps	Goals	Apps	Goals	Apps	Goals	Apps	Goals
Goalkeepers
1	GK	(United States) USA	Alyssa Naeher	25	0	24	0	1	0	0	0
19	GK	(United States) USA	Mackenzie Wood	5	0	2+1	0	0	0	2	0
37	GK	(Jamaica) JAM	Sydney Schneider	1	0	0	0	0	0	1	0
Defenders
3	DF	(United States) USA	Sam Staab	17	1	16	1	0	0	1	0
12	DF	(Finland) FIN	Natalia Kuikka	26	0	25	0	1	0	0	0
23	DF	(United States) USA	Tatumn Milazzo	19	0	13+4	0	0	0	1+1	0
28	DF	(Germany) GER	Maximiliane Rall	10	1	9	1	0	0	1	0
30	DF	(United States) USA	Camryn Biegalski	9	0	3+4	0	0+1	0	0+1	0
32	DF	(United States) USA	Taylor Malham	23	0	16+3	0	1	0	3	0
41	DF	(United States) USA	Hannah Anderson	20	0	15+1	0	1	0	3	0
Midfielders
4	MF	(United States) USA	Cari Roccaro	29	0	26	0	1	0	2	0
5	MF	(Brazil) BRA	Julia Bianchi	21	1	9+8	1	0+1	0	3	0
10	MF	(United States) USA	Shea Groom	21	0	3+14	0	1	0	1+2	0
11	MF	(United States) USA	Chardonnay Curran	14	0	0+11	0	0	0	0+3	0
13	MF	(Bermuda) BER	Leilanni Nesbeth	22	1	10+8	1	0+1	0	3	0
16	MF	(United States) USA	Sophie Jones	1	0	0	0	0	0	0+1	0
20	MF	(United States) USA	Bea Franklin	20	1	12+4	1	1	0	3	0
21	MF	(Canada) CAN	Julia Grosso	11	0	10	0	1	0	0	0
Forwards
7	FW	(United States) USA	Ava Cook	3	0	0+3	0	0	0	0	0
8	FW	(United States) USA	Jameese Joseph	27	4	9+14	2	1	1	2+1	1
9	FW	(United States) USA	Mallory Swanson	25	7	24	7	1	0	0	0
14	FW	(Brazil) BRA	Ludmila	7	3	6+1	3	0	0	0	0
15	FW	(United States) USA	Sarah Griffith	9	1	3+4	0	0	0	0+2	1
22	FW	(Morocco) MAR	Rosella Ayane	1	0	1	0	0	0	0	0
24	FW	(United States) USA	Jenna Bike	27	2	15+8	1	0+1	0	3	1
26	FW	(Portugal) POR	Nádia Gomes	12	0	3+6	0	0	0	2+1	0
33	FW	(United States) USA	Ally Cook	16	0	1+13	0	0+1	0	1	0
34	FW	(United States) USA	Ally Schlegel	26	7	19+3	7	1	0	0+3	0
Players who appeared for the club but left during the season:
55	FW	(United States) USA	Penelope Hocking	14	4	12+1	4	0	0	1	0

=== Goals ===
Rank	No.	Pos.	Nat.	Name	NWSL	Playoffs	Summer Cup	Total
1	34	FW	(United States)	Ally Schlegel	7	0	0	7
1	9	FW	(United States)	Mallory Swanson	7	0	0	7
2	55	FW	(United States)	Penelope Hocking	4	0	0	4
3	8	FW	(United States)	Jameese Joseph	2	1	1	4
4	14	FW	(Brazil)	Ludmila	3	0	0	3
5	24	FW	(United States)	Jenna Bike	1	0	1	2
6	5	MF	(Brazil)	Julia Bianchi	1	0	0	1
6	7	FW	(United States)	Ava Cook	1	0	0	1
6	20	MF	(United States)	Bea Franklin	1	0	0	1
6	13	MF	(Bermuda)	Leilanni Nesbeth	1	0	0	1
6	28	DF	(Germany)	Maximiliane Rall	1	0	0	1
6	3	DF	(United States)	Sam Staab	1	0	0	1
7	15	FW	(United States)	Sarah Griffith	0	0	1	1
Own goals					1	0	0	1
Total					31	1	3	35

=== Assists ===
Rank	No.	Pos.	Nat.	Name	NWSL	Playoffs	Summer Cup	Total
1	9	FW	(United States)	Mallory Swanson	4	0	0	4
2	10	MF	(United States)	Shea Groom	2	0	1	3
2	8	FW	(United States)	Jameese Joseph	2	0	1	3
3	24	FW	(United States)	Jenna Bike	2	0	0	2
3	32	DF	(United States)	Taylor Malham	2	0	0	2
3	3	DF	(United States)	Sam Staab	2	0	0	2
4	41	DF	(United States)	Hannah Anderson	1	0	0	1
4	33	FW	(United States)	Ally Cook	1	0	0	1
4	15	FW	(United States)	Sarah Griffith	1	0	0	1
4	55	FW	(United States)	Penelope Hocking	1	0	0	1
4	12	DF	(United States)	Natalia Kuikka	1	0	0	1
4	13	MF	(United States)	Leilanni Nesbeth	1	0	0	1
Total					20	0	2	22

=== Clean sheets ===
Rank	No.	Nat.	Name	NWSL	Playoffs	Summer Cup	Total
1	1	(United States)	Alyssa Naeher	6	0	0	6
2	19	(United States)	Mackenzie Wood	0	0	1	1
Total				6	0	1	7

=== Disciplinary record ===
No.	Pos.	Nat.	Name	NWSL			Playoffs			Summer Cup			Total		
No.	Pos.	Nat.	Name	Booked	(yellow card) (yellow-red card)	Sent off (straight red)	Booked	(yellow card) (yellow-red card)	Sent off (straight red)	Booked	(yellow card) (yellow-red card)	Sent off (straight red)	Booked	(yellow card) (yellow-red card)	Sent off (straight red)
3	DF	(United States)	Sam Staab	3	0	0	0	0	0	1	0	0	4	0	0
4	MF	(United States)	Cari Roccaro	3	0	0	0	0	0	0	0	0	3	0	0
5	MF	(Brazil)	Julia Bianchi	2	0	0	0	0	0	0	0	0	2	0	0
7	FW	(United States)	Ava Cook	1	0	0	0	0	0	0	0	0	1	0	0
8	FW	(United States)	Jameese Joseph	1	0	0	0	0	0	1	0	0	2	0	0
10	MF	(United States)	Shea Groom	1	0	0	0	0	0	1	0	0	2	0	0
11	MF	(United States)	Chardonnay Curran	1	0	0	0	0	0	0	0	0	1	0	0
12	DF	(Finland)	Natalia Kuikka	1	0	0	0	0	0	0	0	0	1	0	0
13	MF	(Bermuda)	Leilanni Nesbeth	2	0	0	0	0	0	0	0	0	2	0	0
14	FW	(Brazil)	Ludmila	0	0	1	0	0	0	0	0	0	0	0	1
16	MF	(United States)	Sophie Jones	0	0	0	0	0	0	1	0	0	1	0	0
20	MF	(United States)	Bea Franklin	2	0	0	0	0	0	0	0	0	2	0	0
23	DF	(United States)	Tatumn Milazzo	1	0	0	0	0	0	0	0	0	1	0	0
24	FW	(United States)	Jenna Bike	4	0	0	0	0	0	1	0	0	5	0	0
32	DF	(United States)	Taylor Malham	2	0	0	0	0	0	0	0	0	2	0	0
34	FW	(United States)	Ally Schlegel	0	0	0	0	0	0	1	0	0	1	0	0
41	DF	(United States)	Hannah Anderson	3	0	0	0	0	0	1	0	0	4	0	0
55	FW	(United States)	Penelope Hocking	5	0	0	0	0	0	0	0	0	5	0	0
Total				32	0	1	0	0	0	7	0	0	39	0	1

== Transactions ==
=== Draft selections ===
Draft selections are not automatically signed to the team roster. The 2024 NWSL Draft was held on January 12, 2024, in Anaheim, California.

style="text-align:left"|2024 NWSL Draft selections, by round
Round	Pick	Pos.	Nat.	Player	College	Status	Ref.
1	10	MF	(Bermuda) BER	Leilanni Nesbeth	Florida State University	Signed to a three-year contract on March 6, 2024.	
2	15	FW	(United States) USA	Jameese Joseph	North Carolina State University	Signed to a three-year contract on March 8, 2024	
3	31	DF	(United States) USA	Hannah Anderson	Texas Tech University	Signed to a one-year contract with a club option for a second year on March 12, 2024.	
3	41	MF	(United States) USA	Bea Franklin	University of Arkansas	Signed to a one-year contract with a club option for a second year on March 13, 2024.	
4	45	MF	(United States) USA	Celia Gaynor	Michigan State University	Not signed.	

=== Contracts ===
style="text-align:left"|Contract expirations
Date	Pos.	Nat.	Player	Notes	Ref.
November 20, 2023	FW	(Australia) AUS	Chelsie Dawber	Contract option declined.	
November 20, 2023	FW	(Japan) JPN	Yūki Nagasato	Contract option not exercised.	

style="text-align:left"|Contract re-signings
Date	Pos.	Nat.	Player	Notes	Ref.
November 20, 2023	MF	(Puerto Rico) PUR	Jill Aguilera	Contract option exercised.	
December 5, 2023	DF	(United States) USA	Taylor Malham	Re-signed to a two-year contract.	
December 8, 2023	DF	(United States) USA	Cari Roccaro	Free agent re-signed to a two-year contract.	
January 16, 2024	FW	(United States) USA	Mallory Swanson	Free agent re-signed to a five-year contract.	
March 22, 2024	DF	(United States) USA	Sam Staab	Re-signed to a three-year contract.	

style="text-align:left"|Waivers
Date	Pos.	Nat.	Player	Notes	Ref.
February 26, 2024	DF	(United States) USA	Amanda Fick	Released.	
February 26, 2024	MF	(United States) USA	Addie McCain	Released.	
March 9, 2024	MF	(El Salvador) ESA	Samantha Fisher	Released.	
March 11, 2024	MF	(Puerto Rico) PUR	Jill Aguilera	Released.	
September 16, 2024	DF	(United States) USA	Sami Feller	Mutual contract termination.	

=== Loans ===
style="text-align:left"|Loans in
Date	Pos.	Nat.	Player	Previous club	Fee/notes	Ref.
August 31, 2024	FW	(Morocco) MAR	Rosella Ayane	(England) Tottenham Hotspur F.C.	Loaned through the end of the 2024 NWSL season.	

style="text-align:left"|Loans out
Date	Pos.	Nat.	Player	Destination club	Fee/notes	Ref.
February 6, 2024	GK	(United States) USA	Mackenzie Wood	(France) Stade de Reims	Recalled from loan.	

=== Transfers ===
style="text-align:left"|Transfers in
Date	Pos.	Nat.	Player	Former club	Fee/notes	Ref.
January 4, 2024	MF	(United States) USA	Chardonnay Curran	(United States) Kansas City Current	Acquired via waiver wire and signed to a two-year contract.	
January 12, 2024	DF	(United States) USA	Sam Staab	(United States) Washington Spirit	In exchange for the 3rd overall pick in the 2024 NWSL Draft.	
January 17, 2024	MF	(United States) USA	Shea Groom	(United States) Houston Dash	Free agent signed to a two-year contract.	
January 18, 2024	DF	(Finland) FIN	Natalia Kuikka	(United States) Portland Thorns FC	Free agent signed to a three-year contract.	
January 22, 2024	DF	(United States) USA	Camryn Biegalski	(United States) Washington Spirit	Free agent signed to a one-year contract with a mutual option for a second year.	
January 22, 2024	DF	(Germany) GER	Maximiliane Rall	(Germany) FC Bayern Munich	In exchange for an undisclosed transfer fee and signed to a one-year contract with a mutual option for a second year.	
January 29, 2024	GK	(Jamaica) JAM	Sydney Schneider	(Czech Republic) AC Sparta Prague	In exchange for an undisclosed transfer fee and signed to a one-year contract with an option for a second year.	
March 7, 2024	FW	(Portugal) POR	Nádia Gomes	(United States) San Francisco Glens	Preseason trialist signed to a one-year contract with an option for a second year.	
March 13, 2024	FW	(United States) USA	Ally Cook	(United States) UCLA Bruins	Preseason trialist signed to a one-year contract with an option for a second year.	
July 8, 2024	MF	(Canada) CAN	Julia Grosso	(Italy) Juventus FC	Signed to a three-year contract.	
July 29, 2024	FW	(Brazil) BRA	Ludmila	(Spain) Atlético Madrid	Signed to a three-year contract.	

style="text-align:left"|Transfers out
Date	Pos.	Nat.	Player	Destination club	Fee/notes	Ref.
January 2, 2024	DF	(United States) USA	Tierna Davidson	(United States) NJ/NY Gotham FC	Free agent signing.	
January 8, 2024	FW	(Canada) CAN	Bianca St-Georges	(United States) North Carolina Courage	Free agent signing.	
January 10, 2024	DF	(United States) USA	Casey Krueger	(United States) Washington Spirit	Free agent signing.	
January 11, 2024	FW	(Japan) JPN	Yūki Nagasato	(United States) Houston Dash	Free agent signing.	
January 12, 2024	DF	(United States) USA	Arin Wright	(United States) Racing Louisville FC	In exchange for the 15th overall pick in the 2024 NWSL Draft and $125,000 in allocation money.	
January 22, 2024	FW	(United States) USA	Ella Stevens	(United States) NJ/NY Gotham FC	Free agent signing.	
August 31, 2024	FW	(United States) USA	Penelope Hocking	(United States) Bay FC	In exchange for a $350,000 transfer fee.	

=== Preseason trialists ===
Pos.	Nat.	Player	Previous club	Ref.
FW	(United States) USA	Ally Cook	(United States) UCLA Bruins	
MF	(Finland) FIN	Jenny Danielsson	(Sweden) KIF Örebro DFF	
FW	(United States) USA	Mia Fontana	(United States) California Golden Bears	
FW	(Portugal) POR	Nádia Gomes	(United States) San Francisco Glens	
GK	(United States) USA	Erin McKinney	(United States) Wisconsin Badgers	
DF	(United States) USA	Bridget Rieken	(United States) Washington State Cougars	
FW	(United States) USA	Paige Webber	(United States) Indiana Hoosiers	

== Awards ==
=== NWSL monthly awards ===
==== Best XI of the Month ====
Month	Nat.	Pos.	Player	Ref.
March/April	(United States)	GK	Alyssa Naeher	
March/April	(United States)	DF	Sam Staab	
May	(United States)	DF	Sam Staab (2)	
June	(United States)	FW	Mallory Swanson	

=== NWSL weekly awards ===
==== Goal of the Week ====
Wk.	Nat.	Player	Won	Ref.
1	(United States)	Ally Schlegel	Nom.	
5	(United States)	Mallory Swanson	Nom.	
12	(United States)	Mallory Swanson	Nom.	
14	(United States)	Mallory Swanson	Won	
15	(United States)	Mallory Swanson (2)	Won	
16	(United States)	Jameese Joseph	Won	
21	(Brazil)	Ludmila	Nom.	

==== Save of the Week ====
Wk.	Nat.	Player	Won	Ref.
1	(United States)	Alyssa Naeher	Won	
4	(United States)	Tatumn Milazzo	Won	
5	(United States)	Tatumn Milazzo (2)	Won	
6	(Finland)	Natalia Kuikka	Nom.	
6	(United States)	Alyssa Naeher	Nom.	
13	(United States)	Alyssa Naeher	Nom.	
14	(United States)	Alyssa Naeher (2)	Won	
14	(United States)	Tatumn Milazzo	Nom.	
18	(Finland)	Natalia Kuikka	Won	
24	(United States)	Alyssa Naeher (3)	Won	
