= 2023 Chicago Red Stars season =

Chicago Red Stars 2023 soccer season

Chicago Red Stars
2023 season
- Board chairwoman: Kim Vender Moffatt
- General manager: Vacant
- Head coach: Chris Petrucelli
- Stadium: SeatGeek Stadium (capacity: 20,000)
- League: 12th of 12
- Challenge Cup: Group stage
- Playoffs: Did not qualify
- Top goalscorer: League: 4 goals Bianca St-Georges; Ella Stevens; All: 5 goals Penelope Hocking
- Highest home attendance: 8,961 (Sep 17 vs. LA)
- Lowest home attendance: 2,356 (Apr 15 vs. KC)
- Average home league attendance: 4,848
- Biggest win: 4–2 (Apr 15 vs. KC)
- Biggest defeat: 0–5 (Jun 10 vs. NC); 0–5 (Aug 20 vs. ORL)
Home colors	Away colors
- All statistics correct as of October 15, 2023.

The 2023 Chicago Red Stars season was the team's fifteenth as a professional women's soccer team, and tenth in the National Women's Soccer League (NWSL), the top tier of women's soccer in the United States.

== Background ==
=== Team sale ===
On October 3, 2022, the United States Soccer Federation published the Yates Report detailing the 2021 NWSL abuse scandal. The report detailed alleged abuses experienced by players from coaches and staff, and included reports of abusive behavior by former Red Stars head coach Rory Dames, who resigned in November 2021. The Yates Report indicated that Red Stars majority owner Arnim Whisler was aware of the allegations and either declined to take action or actively defended Dames, and a report in The Athletic described a letter sent by minority owners to all Red Stars investors and board members as early as January 3, 2022, that detailed allegations of abuse by Dames and complaints against Whisler over poor player housing conditions and his continued influence over club operations.

On October 5, Whisler stepped down as the team's representative to the NWSL's board of governors. Later that day, the Red Stars board of directors voted to remove Whisler from the club's board of directors. The team transitioned to being managed by its board with Kim Vender Moffat as its chairwoman.

On October 10, Chicago Red Stars players released a joint statement asking Whisler to sell his stake in the team. Red Stars chief business officer Vicky Lynch resigned the same day, and the club named Mike Ernst as her interim replacement.

On December 5, Whisler confirmed his intent to sell his stake in the club through investment bank Inner Circle Sports. On December 15, the club's board released a statement confirming the sale process.

=== Hirings ===
On November 3, 2022, assistant coach Morinao Imaizumi left the Red Stars to become assistant coach of NWSL competitors Washington Spirit. On January 11, 2023, the Red Stars hired former Red Stars player and Kansas City Current assistant coach Ella Masar as the club's new assistant coach.

On January 19, 2023, the Red Stars promoted associate general manager Michelle Lomnicki to general manager. On May 5, the Red Stars announced that the team had fired Lomnicki on May 4 due to a "lapse in judgment to not share important information with club leadership". Lomnicki had not informed the club of the hiring of former Red Stars assistant coach Craig Harrington by Chicago Empire FC, a Chicago-area youth soccer club formerly affiliated with the Red Stars where Lomnicki's husband serves as sporting director. Harrington had been banned for two years by the NWSL following the publication of the league's joint investigation with the NWSL Players Association into the 2021 NWSL abuse scandal, which implicated Harrington in allegations of inappropriate behavior around players.

=== Kit changes ===
Chicago released a new primary kit, named the Foundation Kit, on March 15, 2023. The black kit features a connected offset pattern of gray six-pointed stars around the team's traditional Flag of Chicago motif of four red stars at the center.

== Summary ==
=== Offseason ===
On December 23, 2022, the Red Stars announced that defender Tierna Davidson would train during the offseason with German club VfL Wolfsburg, which had agreed to become strategic partners with the Red Stars during the 2022 season.

The team traveled to IMG Academy in Bradenton, Florida, for its preseason training camp.

=== May ===
On May 27, the Red Stars faced the Orlando Pride at home. In the match's 22nd minute, Yūki Nagasato scored her 20th career regular-season goal, becoming the 12th player to be credited with 20 goals and 20 assists in a regular-season NWSL career. The goal held up as the match winner in a 1–0 shutout. In the 49th minute, Naeher recorded her 518th regular-season career save, breaking the NWSL career record previously held by Ashlyn Harris. After the match, the Red Stars honored Naeher's 150th regular-season career NWSL appearance and the 100th regular-season NWSL appearance of Cari Roccaro.

=== June ===
The Red Stars won their second consecutive regular-season match for the first time in the 2023 season on June 6, defeating Angel City FC on the road 2–0 behind an 11-minute brace by Ava Cook in the first half. The match also marked the 100th NWSL appearance for defender Casey Krueger, all with Chicago, making her the sixth player in league history to record 100 regular-season appearances with the same club.

On June 30, the league issued a one-match suspension to midfielder Julia Bianchi for major game misconduct, for an offense committed in 63rd minute of the June 25 match against NJ/NY Gotham FC, and fined head coach Chris Petrucelli an undisclosed amount of money for comments "detrimental to the league" on social media on June 26. Petrucelli had tweeted "When do the charters start in this league?" during a four-hour delay returning home from the June 25 match against Gotham FC.

== Stadium and facilities ==
The Red Stars continued to play in SeatGeek Stadium, their full-time home since the team's 2016 season.

== Broadcasting ==
On April 26, 2023, the Red Stars announced the continuation of its local broadcast agreement with WCIU-TV ("The U"), including matches broadcast on WMEU-CD and WCIU-TV. Broadcast talent included play-by-play announcer Dan Kelly and color commentators Erica Ayala and former Red Stars player Jackie Santacaterina Manny.

== Team ==
=== Staff ===
As of June 7, 2023.

style="text-align:left"|Technical staff
Head coach	Chris Petrucelli
Assistant coach	Ella Masar
Goalkeeper coach	Rade Tanaskovic

style="text-align:left"|Performance staff
High performance director	Jake Roy
Sports scientist and data analyst	Jimmy Haley
Head athletic trainer	Emily Fortunato

=== Players ===
As of June 7, 2023.

First-team roster
No.	Pos.	Nation	Name	Birthday (age)	Since	Previous team	Notes
1	GK	(United States) USA	Alyssa Naeher	April 20, 1988 (aged 34)	2016	(United States) Boston Breakers	
19	GK	(United States) USA	Mackenzie Wood	July 4, 2000 (aged 22)	2023	(United States) Northwestern Wildcats	IRP (Note: Injury replacement player)
21	GK	(United States) USA	Emily Boyd	July 25, 1996 (aged 26)	2018	(United States) California Golden Bears	
3	DF	(United States) USA	Arin Wright	December 25, 1992 (aged 30)	2015	(United States) Kentucky Wildcats	
6	DF	(United States) USA	Casey Krueger	August 23, 1990 (aged 32)	2016	(Norway) Avaldsnes IL	
12	DF	(United States) USA	Tierna Davidson	September 19, 1998 (aged 24)	2019	(United States) Stanford Cardinal	
23	DF	(United States) USA	Tatumn Milazzo	April 17, 1998 (aged 24)	2021	(United States) South Carolina Gamecocks	
28	DF	(United States) USA	Kayla Sharples	June 17, 1997 (aged 25)	2019	(United States) Northwestern Wildcats	
31	DF	(United States) USA	Amanda Kowalski	September 1, 1998 (aged 24)	2022	(United States) Butler Bulldogs	
2	MF	(United States) USA	Samantha Fisher	August 26, 1999 (aged 23)	2023	(United States) Notre Dame Fighting Irish	
4	MF	(United States) USA	Cari Roccaro	July 18, 1994 (aged 28)	2023	(United States) Angel City FC	
5	MF	(Brazil) BRA	Julia Bianchi	October 7, 1997 (aged 25)	2023	(Brazil) Palmeiras	INT (Note: International player)
13	MF	(United States) USA	Addie McCain	August 28, 1999 (aged 23)	2023	(United States) Kansas City Current	
14	MF	(Puerto Rico) PUR	Jill Aguilera	January 5, 1998 (aged 25)	2022	(United States) Arizona Wildcats	
16	MF	(United States) USA	Sophie Jones	July 17, 2001 (aged 21)	2023	(United States) Duke Blue Devils	
18	MF	(Germany) GER	Sandra Starke	July 31, 1993 (aged 29)	2023	(Germany) VfL Wolfsburg	INT; LOAN (Note: On loan from Wolfsburg until June 30.)
22	MF	(Canada) CAN	Bianca St-Georges	July 28, 1997 (aged 25)	2019	(United States) West Virginia Mountaineers	INT
29	MF	(United States) USA	Sami Feller	April 4, 2000 (aged 22)	2023	(United States) Denver Pioneers	D45 (Note: 45-day disabled list)
32	MF	(United States) USA	Taylor Malham	May 20, 1999 (aged 23)	2023	(United States) Arkansas Razorbacks	
7	FW	(Japan) JPN	Yūki Nagasato	July 15, 1987 (aged 35)	2022	(United States) Racing Louisville FC	INT
8	FW	(United States) USA	Ella Stevens	December 11, 1997 (aged 25)	2020	(United States) Duke Blue Devils	
9	FW	(United States) USA	Mallory Swanson	April 29, 1998 (aged 24)	2021	(United States) NJ/NY Gotham FC	SEI (Note: On season-ending injury list)
15	FW	(United States) USA	Sarah Griffith	April 30, 1999 (aged 23)	2022	(United States) Purdue Boilermakers	D45
20	FW	(Jamaica) JAM	Cheyna Matthews	November 10, 1993 (aged 29)	2023	(United States) Racing Louisville FC	
24	FW	(United States) USA	Jenna Bike	June 1, 1998 (aged 24)	2023	(United States) NJ/NY Gotham FC	
25	FW	(United States) USA	Ava Cook	June 17, 1997 (aged 25)	2021	(United States) Michigan State Spartans	
27	FW	(Australia) AUS	Chelsie Dawber	January 12, 2000 (aged 23)	2022	(Australia) Adelaide United FC	INT; LOAN (Note: Loaned out to Norrköping through the end of the 2023 Damallsvenskan season.)
34	FW	(United States) USA	Ally Schlegel	June 17, 1997 (aged 25)	2023	(United States) Penn State Nittany Lions	
55	FW	(United States) USA	Penelope Hocking	December 29, 1999 (aged 23)	2023	(United States) Penn State Nittany Lions	

== Competitions ==
Win Draw Loss Fixtures

=== Preseason ===
February 18, 2023	Chicago Red Stars	2–3	Racing Louisville FC	Westfield, Indiana
3 p.m. CST (UTC−5)	Bike; Hocking	Chicago report Racing report	Fischer 31'; Davis 60'; Monaghan 67'	Stadium: Grand Park Sports Campus
Note: Closed-door scrimmage by invitation of Indy Eleven.

February 27, 2023	Chicago Red Stars	1–1	Kansas City Current	Bradenton, Florida
	Milazzo 90' (Bianchi)	Report; Chicago report	Kizer	Stadium: IMG Academy
Note: Closed-door scrimmage.

March 2, 2023	NJ/NY Gotham FC	2–1	Chicago Red Stars	Bradenton, Florida
	Purce 45' (Bruninha)	Report	Goal	Stadium: IMG Academy
Note: Closed-door scrimmage played as three 45-minute periods.

=== Non-competitive friendlies ===
April 8, 2023	(United States) Chicago Red Stars	2–5	Mexico WNT	Bridgeview, Illinois
7 p.m. CDT (UTC−4)	Bianchi 39'; Griffith 45+1' (Bike); Hocking (yellow card) 51'	Report	Corral 20' (pen.); Nieto 22' (Ovalle); Sánchez 34' (Ovalle); Ordóñez 61' (Rodriguez); Casarez (yellow card) 67'; Jaramillo 78' (yellow card) 90+1'	Stadium: SeatGeek Stadium
Note: Part of the inaugural MexTour W.

=== NWSL Challenge Cup ===
==== Group stage ====
May 3, 2023	Houston Dash	2–0	Chicago Red Stars	Houston, Texas
7:00 p.m. EDT (UTC−5)	Olivieri 5'; Ordóñez 72' (pen.)	Report		Stadium: Shell Energy Stadium; Attendance: 3,696; Referee: Adorae Monroy

May 31, 2023	Chicago Red Stars	0–2	Racing Louisville FC	Bridgeview, Illinois
7:00 p.m. EDT (UTC−5)	Roccaro (yellow card) 70'; St-Georges (yellow card) 78'	Report	Holloway (yellow card) 32'; Kanu 44' (Monaghan) (yellow card) 62'; Goins 71' (DeMelo)	Stadium: SeatGeek Stadium; Attendance: 1,762; Referee: Laura Rodriguez

June 14, 2023	Kansas City Current	4–0	Chicago Red Stars	Kansas City, Kansas
7:00 p.m. CDT (UTC−5)	Cooper (yellow card) 20'; Debinha 54' (Mace), 70' (DiBernardo); Mace (yellow card) 55'; DiBernardo 60'; Kizer 62' (Larsson)	NWSL report ESPN report	Malham (yellow card) 82'	Stadium: Children's Mercy Park; Attendance: 8,226; Referee: Shawn Tehini

July 21, 2023	Racing Louisville FC	2–0	Chicago Red Stars	Louisville, Kentucky
8:00 p.m. EDT (UTC−4)	Baggett 11'; Monaghan 19'	Report		Stadium: Lynn Family Stadium; Attendance: 5,499; Referee: Nabil Bensalah

July 29, 2023	Chicago Red Stars	0–0	Kansas City Current	Bridgeview, Illinois
7:00 p.m. EDT (UTC−5)		Report		Stadium: SeatGeek Stadium; Attendance: 2,959; Referee: Abdou Ndiaye

August 5, 2023	Chicago Red Stars	3–0	Houston Dash	Bridgeview, Illinois
7:00 p.m. EDT (UTC−5)	Hocking 37', 43'; Nagasato 50'	Report		Stadium: SeatGeek Stadium; Attendance: 3,137; Referee: Karen Callado

==== Central Division standings ====
Pos	Team	Pld	W	T	L	GF	GA	GD	Pts	Qualification	KC	LOU	HOU	CHI
1	Kansas City Current	6	4	1	1	14	4	+10	13	Advance to knockout stage	—	3–0	3–1	4–0
2	Racing Louisville FC	6	4	0	2	10	6	+4	12	Advance to knockout stage based on ranking	3–2	—	3–0	2–0
3	Houston Dash	6	2	0	4	4	11	−7	6		0–2	1–0	—	2–0
4	Chicago Red Stars	6	1	1	4	3	10	−7	4		0–0	0–2	3–0	—

Source: NWSL

==== Results by matchday ====
Matchday	1	2	3	4	5	6
Stadium	A	H	A	A	H	H
Result	L	L	L	L	D	W
Position	4	4	4	4	4	4

Updated to match(es) played on October 15, 2023. Source: NWSL
A = Away; H = Home; W = Win; D = Draw; L = Loss

=== Regular season ===
==== Matches ====
March 25, 2023 1	San Diego Wave FC	3–2	Chicago Red Stars	San Diego, California
7:00 p.m. PDT (UTC−7)	Ali 22'; Shaw 32'; Kornieck (yellow card) 58'; Morgan 89' (pen.)	NWSL report ESPN report	Nagasato 18'; Swanson 45+4' (pen.); Davidson (yellow card) 49'; Wright (yellow card) 88'	Stadium: Snapdragon Stadium; Attendance: 30,854; Referee: Elton García

April 1, 2023 2	Chicago Red Stars	1–2	Houston Dash	Bridgeview, Illinois
1:00 p.m. CDT (UTC−5)	Jacobs 19' (o.g.)	NWSL report ESPN report	Sánchez 4' (Salmon); Schmidt (yellow card) 51'; Ordóñez 60' (pen.)	Stadium: SeatGeek Stadium; Attendance: 4,065; Referee: Karen Callado

April 15, 2023 3	Chicago Red Stars	4–2	Kansas City Current	Bridgeview, Illinois
7:00 p.m. CDT (UTC−5)	Stevens 4'; Hocking 49' (Stevens), 67' (Matthews) (yellow card) 77'; Franch 60' (o.g.); Roccaro (yellow card) 90+6'	NWSL report ESPN report	Debinha 74' (Larsson); Larsson 90+7'	Stadium: SeatGeek Stadium; Attendance: 2,356; Referee: Elijio Arreguin

April 22, 2023 4	OL Reign	5–2	Chicago Red Stars	Seattle, Washington
12:30 p.m. PDT (UTC−7)	Balcer 15' (Latsko), 20' (Barnes); Rapinoe (yellow card) 21'; Fishlock 45+5' (Sonnett), 76' (Balcer); Nagasato 73' (o.g.); Harvey (yellow card) 78'	NWSL report ESPN report	Wright 32'; Schlegel 46'; Bike (yellow card) 85'; Milazzo (yellow card) 90+2'	Stadium: Lumen Field; Attendance: 6,186; Referee: JC Griggs

April 29, 2023 5	Chicago Red Stars	1–1	Washington Spirit	Bridgeview, Illinois
7:00 p.m. CDT (UTC−5)	St-Georges 33' (Schlegel); Stevens (yellow card) 69'	NWSL report ESPN report	McKeown (yellow card) 17'; Hatch 29' (pen.); Staab (yellow card) 67'	Stadium: SeatGeek Stadium; Attendance: 3,610; Referee: Matthew Corrigan

May 7, 2023 6	Chicago Red Stars	1–2	NJ/NY Gotham FC	Bridgeview, Illinois
5:00 p.m. CDT (UTC−5)	Stevens 54' (Bianchi)	NWSL report ESPN report	Nighswonger 5'; Williams 45+2' (Farrelly); Onumonu (yellow card) 79'; Smith (yellow card) 89'	Stadium: SeatGeek Stadium; Attendance: 3,692; Referee: Natalie Simon

May 12, 2023 7	Racing Louisville FC	3–0	Chicago Red Stars	Louisville, Kentucky
7:30 p.m. EDT (UTC−4)	Naeher 35' (o.g.); Wang 45+5' (pen.); Erceg (yellow card) 53'; Goins 89'; Howell (yellow card) 90'	NWSL report ESPN report	Bianchi (yellow card) 6'; St-Georges (yellow card) 28'	Stadium: Lynn Family Stadium; Attendance: 4,143; Referee: Alyssa Nichols

May 21, 2023 8	Portland Thorns FC	4–0	Chicago Red Stars	Portland, Oregon
2:00 p.m. PDT (UTC−7)	Hubly 8' (Coffey) (yellow card) 36'; Dunn 14' (Sugita); Moultrie 16' (Dunn); Kuikka 48' (Coffey)	NWSL report ESPN report	Bianchi (yellow card) 90'	Stadium: Providence Park; Attendance: 20,402; Referee: Tori Penso

May 27, 2023 9	Chicago Red Stars	1–0	Orlando Pride	Bridgeview, Illinois
7:00 p.m. CDT (UTC−5)	Nagasato 22' (Krueger)	NWSL report ESPN report		Stadium: SeatGeek Stadium; Attendance: 5,646; Referee: Rebecca Pagan

June 5, 2023 10	Angel City FC	1–2	Chicago Red Stars	Los Angeles, California
7:00 p.m. PDT (UTC−7)	Riley (yellow card) 85'; Leroux 88' (Thompson)	NWSL report ESPN report	Cook 16' (Bianchi), 27' (Nagasato) (yellow card) 57'	Stadium: BMO Stadium; Attendance: 16,682; Referee: Alex Billeter
Note: Rescheduled from 5 p.m. PDT on June 4 due to Los Angeles FC advancing to the 2023 CONCACAF Champions League final.

June 10, 2023 11	Chicago Red Stars	0–5	North Carolina Courage	Bridgeview, Illinois
7:00 p.m. CDT (UTC−5)	Bike (yellow card) 76'; Milazzo (yellow card) 90+7'	NWSL report ESPN report	Kerolin 11' (Gejl), 34' (Kurtz), 60' (Boade); Gejl 31' (O'Sullivan); O'Sullivan 52' (Miura)	Stadium: SeatGeek Stadium; Attendance: 3,541; Referee: Karen Callado

June 18, 2023 12	Chicago Red Stars	2–3	Portland Thorns FC	Bridgeview, Illinois
5:00 p.m. CDT (UTC−5)	St-Georges (yellow card) 58'; Stevens 72' (pen.); Schlegel 82' (Bianchi)	NWSL report ESPN report	Sugita (yellow card) 29' (goal) 63' (Weaver); Smith 43' (Kuikka); Bixby (yellow card) 65'; Sinclair 75' (Dunn); Hubly (yellow card) 79'	Stadium: SeatGeek Stadium; Attendance: 3,655; Referee: Anya Voigt

June 25, 2023 13	NJ/NY Gotham FC	2–1	Chicago Red Stars	Harrison, New Jersey
5:30 p.m. EDT (UTC−4)	Williams 46' (Martin); Long 69'; Freeman (yellow card) 86'	NWSL report ESPN report	Roccaro 55' (Griffith); Bianchi (yellow card) 63'; Milazzo (yellow card) 81'	Stadium: Red Bull Arena; Attendance: 5,601; Referee: Matthew Corrigan
Note: Match was paused for 50 minutes due to lightning in the area at the 53rd minute.

July 1, 2023 14	Chicago Red Stars	1–0	San Diego Wave FC	Bridgeview, Illinois
7:00 p.m. CDT (UTC−5)	Cook (yellow card) 33'; Stevens 45+1' (Milazzo)	NWSL report ESPN report	Kornieck (yellow card) 45+3'; Pogarch (yellow card) 63'	Stadium: SeatGeek Stadium; Attendance: 5,698; Referee: Thomas Snyder

July 7, 2023 15	Houston Dash	0–1	Chicago Red Stars	Houston, Texas
7:30 p.m. CDT (UTC−5)	Petersen (yellow card) 86'; Olivieri (yellow card) 90+7'	NWSL report ESPN report	Hocking 69' (St-Georges)	Stadium: Shell Energy Stadium; Attendance: 4,892; Referee: Alyssa Nichols

August 20, 2023 16	Orlando Pride	5–0	Chicago Red Stars	Orlando, Florida
7:00 p.m. EDT (UTC−4)	Rafaelle 15'; Bight 24', 49'; Larroquette 64'; Cluff 68'	NWSL report ESPN report	Hocking (yellow card) 25'	Stadium: Exploria Stadium; Attendance: 5,904; Referee: Anya Voigt

August 27, 2023 17	North Carolina Courage	1–1	Chicago Red Stars	Cary, North Carolina
2:00 p.m. EDT (UTC−4)	Boade 14'; Fox (red card) 21'; O'Sullivan (yellow card) 27'	NWSL report ESPN report	Roccaro (yellow card) 4'; Nagasato (yellow card) 44'; Milazzo 63'	Stadium: WakeMed Soccer Park; Attendance: 4,000; Referee: Kevin Broadley

September 3, 2023 18	Washington Spirit	0–2	Chicago Red Stars	Washington, D.C.
5:00 p.m. EDT (UTC−4)	Butel (yellow card) 64'	NWSL report ESPN report	Hocking (yellow card) 41'; St-Georges 48'; Nagasato 60'	Stadium: Audi Field; Attendance: 10,035; Referee: Brandon Stevis

September 17, 2023 19	Chicago Red Stars	2–2	Angel City FC	Bridgeview, Illinois
5:00 p.m. CDT (UTC−5)	Cook 68'; Matthews 75'	NWSL report ESPN report	Riley 39' (yellow card) 76'; Gorden (yellow card) 47'; Endō 71'	Stadium: SeatGeek Stadium; Attendance: 8,961; Referee: Alyssa Nichols

September 30, 2023 20	Chicago Red Stars	1–0	Racing Louisville FC	Bridgeview, Illinois
7:00 p.m. CDT (UTC−5)	St-Georges 33'; Matthews (yellow card) 80'	NWSL report ESPN report	Kanu (yellow card) 90+9'	Stadium: SeatGeek Stadium; Attendance: 4,104; Referee: Sergii Demianchuk

October 7, 2023 21	Kansas City Current	6–3	Chicago Red Stars	Kansas City, Kansas
7:00 p.m. CDT (UTC−5)	Rodriguez 14'; LaBonta 22'; Spaanstra 44'; Debinha 52'; Kizer 90+2'; Larsson 90+6'	NWSL report ESPN report	Sharples 20' (yellow card) 90+6'; Nagasato (yellow card) 38'; Ballisager 45+1' (o.g.); St-Georges 63' (yellow card) 81'	Stadium: Children's Mercy Park; Attendance: 15,671; Referee: Laura Rodriguez

October 15, 2023 22	Chicago Red Stars	0–2	OL Reign	Bridgeview, Illinois
4:00 p.m. CDT (UTC−5)		NWSL report ESPN report	Latsko (yellow card) 23'; Rapinoe 47', 50'; Fishlock 59'; Cook (yellow card) 89'; Balcer (yellow card) 90+3'	Stadium: SeatGeek Stadium; Attendance: 8,004; Referee: Anya Voigt

==== Regular season standings ====
Pos	Team	Pld	W	D	L	GF	GA	GD	Pts
8	Washington Spirit	22	7	9	6	26	29	−3	30
9	Racing Louisville FC	22	6	9	7	25	24	+1	27
10	Houston Dash	22	6	8	8	16	18	−2	26
11	Kansas City Current	22	8	2	12	30	36	−6	26
12	Chicago Red Stars	22	7	3	12	28	50	−22	24

Source: NWSL
Rules for classification: Tiebreakers

==== Results summary ====
Overall								Home						Away					
Pld	W	D	L	GF	GA	GD	Pts	W	D	L	GF	GA	GD	W	D	L	GF	GA	GD
22	7	3	12	28	50	−22	24	4	2	5	14	20	−6	3	1	7	14	30	−16

Last updated: October 15, 2023.
Source: NWSLsoccer.com

==== Results by matchday ====
Matchday	1	2	3	4	5	6	7	8	9	10	11	12	13	14	15	16	17	18	19	20	21	22
Stadium	A	H	H	A	H	H	A	A	H	A	H	H	A	H	A	A	A	A	H	H	A	H
Result	L	L	W	L	D	L	L	L	W	W	L	L	L	W	W	L	D	W	D	W	L	L
Position	8	10	8	9	11	12	12	12	11	10	10	11	12	12	11	12	12	11	12	11	12	12

Updated to match(es) played on October 15, 2023. Source: NWSL
A = Away; H = Home; W = Win; D = Draw; L = Loss

== Statistics ==
As of matches played October 15, 2023.

style="text-align:left"|Goalscorers, per competition
Player				Goals by competition			
Pos.	No.	Nat.	Name	NWSL	Cup	Playoffs	Total
FW	55	(United States) USA	Penelope Hocking	3	2	—	5
DF	22	(Canada) CAN	Bianca St-Georges	4	0	—	4
FW	8	(United States) USA	Ella Stevens	4	0	—	4
FW	7	(Japan) JPN	Yūki Nagasato	3	1	—	4
FW	25	(United States) USA	Ava Cook	3	0	—	3
MF	34	(United States) USA	Ally Schlegel	2	0	—	2
FW		(Jamaica) JAM	Cheyna Matthews	1	0	—	1
DF		(United States) USA	Tatumn Milazzo	1	0	—	1
MF	4	(United States) USA	Cari Roccaro	1	0	—	1
DF		(United States) USA	Kayla Sharples	1	0	—	1
FW	9	(United States) USA	Mallory Swanson	1	0	—	1
DF	3	(United States) USA	Arin Wright	1	0	—	1
Total				25	3	—	28

style="text-align:left"|Assists by player, per competition
Player				Assists by competition			
Pos.	No.	Nat.	Name	NWSL	Cup	Playoffs	Total
MF	5	(Brazil) BRA	Julia Bianchi	5	0	—	5
FW	6	(United States) USA	Casey Krueger	1	3	—	4
FW	15	(United States) USA	Sarah Griffith	2	0	—	2
FW	7	(Japan) JPN	Yūki Nagasato	2	0	—	2
FW		(United States) USA	Penelope Hocking	1	0	—	1
FW		(Jamaica) JAM	Cheyna Matthews	1	0	—	1
DF	23	(United States) USA	Tatumn Milazzo	1	0	—	1
MF	34	(United States) USA	Ally Schlegel	1	0	—	1
DF	22	(Canada) CAN	Bianca St-Georges	1	0	—	1
FW	8	(United States) USA	Ella Stevens	1	0	—	1
Total				16	3	—	19

style="text-align:left"|Clean sheets by goalkeeper, per competition
Player				Clean sheets by competition			
Pos.	No.	Nat.	Name	NWSL	Cup	Playoffs	Total
GK	21	(United States) USA	Emily Boyd	2	2	—	4
GK	1	(United States) USA	Alyssa Naeher	3	0	—	3
Total				5	2	—	7

style="text-align:left"|Disciplinary cards by player, per competition
Player				NWSL		Cup		Playoffs		Total	
Pos.	No.	Nat.	Name	Booked	Sent off (straight red)	Booked	Sent off (straight red)	Booked	Sent off (straight red)	Booked	Sent off (straight red)
DF	22	(Canada) CAN	Bianca St-Georges	3	0	2	0	—		5	0
MF	5	(Brazil) BRA	Julia Bianchi	3	0	0	0	—		3	0
FW	24	(United States) USA	Jenna Bike	2	0	1	0	—		3	0
FW	55	(United States) USA	Penelope Hocking	3	0	0	0	—		3	0
DF	23	(United States) USA	Tatumn Milazzo	3	0	0	0	—		3	0
FW	7	(Japan) JPN	Yūki Nagasato	2	0	1	0	—		3	0
MF	4	(United States) USA	Cari Roccaro	2	0	1	0	—		3	0
FW	25	(United States) USA	Ava Cook	2	0	0	0	—		2	0
DF	3	(United States) USA	Arin Wright	2	0	0	0	—		2	0
DF	12	(United States) USA	Tierna Davidson	1	0	0	0	—		1	0
MF	32	(United States) USA	Taylor Malham	0	0	1	0	—		1	0
FW		(Jamaica) JAM	Cheyna Matthews	1	0	0	0	—		1	0
FW		(United States) USA	Kayla Sharples	1	0	0	0	—		1	0
FW	8	(United States) USA	Ella Stevens	1	0	0	0	—		1	0
Total				25	0	6	0	—		31	0

== Awards ==
As of June 29, 2023.

=== NWSL weekly awards ===
Player of the Week
Wk.	Pos.	Nat.	Player	Won	Ref.
3	FW	(United States) USA	Penelope Hocking	2nd	
5	DF	(United States) USA	Tatumn Milazzo	Nom.	
9	GK	(United States) USA	Alyssa Naeher	2nd	
10	FW	(United States) USA	Ava Cook	Nom.	

Save of the Week
Wk.	Pos.	Nat.	Player	Won	Ref.
7	GK	(United States) USA	Alyssa Naeher	Nom.	
8	GK	(United States) USA	Alyssa Naeher	Won	
9	GK	(United States) USA	Alyssa Naeher	Won	

== Transactions ==
=== Draft selections ===
Draft selections are not automatically signed to the team roster. The 2023 NWSL Draft was held on January 12, 2023, in Philadelphia, Pennsylvania.

style="text-align:left"|2023 NWSL Draft selections, by round
Round	Pick	Pos.	Nat.	Player	College	Status	Ref.
1	7	FW	(United States) USA	Penelope Hocking	Penn State University	Signed to a three-year contract with an option for a fourth year on March 20, 2023.	
2	14	MF	(United States) USA	Grace Yochum	Oklahoma State University	Declined to report to preseason training.	
2	23	FW	(United States) USA	Ally Schlegel	Penn State University	Signed to a three-year contract with an option for a fourth year on March 20, 2023.	
4	43	MF	(United States) USA	Sophie Jones	Duke University	Signed to a two-year contract on March 20, 2023.	

=== Contracts ===
style="text-align:left"|Contract expirations
Date	Pos.	Nat.	Player	Notes	Ref.
December 1, 2022	MF	(United States) USA	Danielle Colaprico	Free agent declined new contract.	
December 1, 2022	MF	(United States) USA	Morgan Gautrat	Free agent declined new contract.	
December 1, 2022	FW	(United States) USA	Rachel Hill	Free agent declined new contract.	
January 8, 2023	DF	(United States) USA	Zoe Morse	Contract expired; new contract offer declined.	

style="text-align:left"|Contract re-signings
Date	Pos.	Nat.	Player	Notes	Ref.
November 11, 2022	FW	(Japan) JPN	Yūki Nagasato	Re-signed to a one-year contract with an option for an additional year.	
November 15, 2022	DF	(United States) USA	Arin Wright	Re-signed to a two-year contract.	
November 16, 2022	DF	(United States) USA	Tatumn Milazzo	Contract option exercised.	
November 16, 2022	FW	(United States) USA	Ella Stevens	Contract option exercised.	
November 16, 2022	DF	(United States) USA	Kayla Sharples	Contract option exercised.	
November 16, 2022	DF	(Canada) CAN	Bianca St-Georges	Contract option exercised.	
November 16, 2022	GK	(United States) USA	Emily Boyd	Contract option exercised.	
December 13, 2022	DF	(United States) USA	Tatumn Milazzo	Signed new two-year contract with an option for an additional year.	

style="text-align:left"|Waivers
Date	Pos.	Nat.	Player	Notes	Ref.
November 16, 2022	MF	(United States) USA	Channing Foster	Waived.	
November 16, 2022	DF	(United States) USA	Mikenna McManus	Waived.	
June 28, 2023	FW	(United States) USA	Brenna Lovera	Released.	

=== Loans ===
style="text-align:left"|Loans in
Date	Pos.	Nat.	Player	Previous club	Fee/notes	Ref.
April 16, 2023	MF	(Germany) GER	Sandra Starke	(Germany) VfL Wolfsburg	Loaned through June 30.	

style="text-align:left"|Loans out
Date	Pos.	Nat.	Player	Destination club	Fee/notes	Ref.
October 31, 2022	FW	(Australia) AUS	Chelsie Dawber	(Australia) Adelaide United FC	Loaned until May 4, 2023; recalled on March 2, 2023.	
October 31, 2022	FW	(United States) USA	Sarah Griffith	(Australia) Newcastle Jets FC	Loaned until April 6, 2023.	
March 2, 2023	FW	(Australia) AUS	Chelsie Dawber	(Sweden) IFK Norrköping	Loaned until the end of the 2023 Damallsvenskan in November.	

=== Transfers ===
style="text-align:left"|Transfers in
Date	Pos.	Nat.	Player	Former club	Fee/notes	Ref.
January 9, 2023	MF	(United States) USA	Addie McCain	(United States) Racing Louisville FC	Acquired via waiver wire and signed to a two-year contract with an option for a third year.	
January 11, 2023	FW	(United States) USA	Jenna Bike	(United States) Racing Louisville FC	Acquired via waiver wire and signed to a two-year contract with an option for a third year.	
January 25, 2023	MF	(United States) USA	Cari Roccaro	(United States) Angel City FC	Acquired in exchange for $65,000 in allocation money.	
January 25, 2023	MF	(Brazil) BRA	Julia Bianchi	(Brazil) Palmeiras	Signed to a two-year contract.	
March 20, 2023	MF	(United States) USA	Taylor Malham	(United States) Racing Louisville FC	Acquired via discovery after being waived and signed to a one-year contract.	
March 25, 2023	FW	(Jamaica) JAM	Cheyna Matthews	(United States) Racing Louisville FC	Free agent signed to a one-year contract with an option for an additional year.	
March 25, 2023	DF	(United States) USA	Sami Feller	(United States) Denver Pioneers	Preseason trialist signed to a three-year contract with an option for an additional year.	
March 25, 2023	FW	(United States) USA	Brenna Lovera	(Iceland) Selfoss	Preseason trialist signed to an injury replacement contract for Addie McCain.	
March 25, 2023	GK	(United States) USA	Mackenzie Wood	(United States) Northwestern Wildcats	Preseason trialist signed to an injury replacement contract for Emily Boyd.	
April 7, 2023	GK	(United States) USA	Meagan McClelland	(United States) Rutgers Scarlet Knights	Signed to a national team replacement contract for Alyssa Naeher.	

style="text-align:left"|Transfers out
Date	Pos.	Nat.	Player	Destination club	Fee/notes	Ref.
December 13, 2022	FW	(United States) USA	Sarah Luebbert	(Mexico) Club América	Transferred for an undisclosed fee.	

=== Retirements ===
Date	Pos.	Nat.	Player	Ref.
December 7, 2022	MF	(United States) USA	Sarah Woldmoe	
October 15, 2023	FW	(Jamaica) JAM	Cheyna Matthews	

=== Preseason trialists ===
Pos.	Nat.	Player	Previous club	Ref.
GK	(United States) USA	Meagan McClelland	(United States) Rutgers Scarlet Knights	
GK	(United States) USA	Morgan Messner	(United States) Penn State Nittany Lions	
MF	(United States) USA	Abby Boyan	(United States) Georgia Bulldogs	
MF	(United States) USA	Meg Brandt	(Germany) MSV Duisburg	
MF	(United States) USA	Meghan Cavanaugh	Puerto Rico Sol FC	
MF	(United States) USA	Sami Feller	(United States) Denver Pioneers	
MF	(United States) USA	Carlee Giammona	(United States) Pepperdine Waves	
MF	(United States) USA	Brenna Lovera	(Iceland) Selfoss	
MF	(United States) USA	Brenna Ochoa	(Germany) MSV Duisburg	
FW	(United States) USA	Bayleigh Chaviers	(Iceland) UMF Valur Reydarfjördur	
MF	(United States) USA	Taylor Malham	(United States) Racing Louisville FC	
FW	(Jamaica) JAM	Cheyna Matthews	(United States) Racing Louisville FC	
