= 2023 North Dakota State Bison women's soccer team =

American college women's soccer season

2023 North Dakota State Bison women's soccer
- Conference: Summit League
- Record: 5–6–6 (1–3–4 Summit)
- Head coach: Mike Regan
- Home stadium: Dacotah Field

2023 Summit League women's soccer standings
	Conf.						Overall
Team	W		L		T	PCT	W		L		T	PCT
Denver ‍†‍‍	5	–	1	–	2	.750	9	–	2	–	7	.694
South Dakota State ‍‍‡‍^{y}	4	–	1	–	3	.688	13	–	4	–	3	.725
Oral Roberts ‍‍‍	4	–	3	–	1	.563	8	–	7	–	4	.526
Omaha ‍‍‍	3	–	1	–	4	.625	7	–	5	–	7	.553
South Dakota ‍‍‍	3	–	4	–	1	.438	7	–	7	–	4	.500
Kansas City ‍‍‍	2	–	3	–	3	.438	3	–	7	–	8	.389
North Dakota State ‍‍‍	1	–	3	–	4	.375	5	–	6	–	6	.471
North Dakota ‍‍‍	1	–	3	–	4	.375	5	–	7	–	6	.444
St. Thomas* ‍‍‍	1	–	5	–	2	.250	3	–	7	–	5	.367
† – Conference champion ‡ – 2023 Summit League tournament champion y – Invited to the NCAA tournament * Ineligible for the 2023 NCAA tournament due to transition from Division III; As of December 5, 2023; Rankings from United Soccer Coaches Poll; Source: Summit League

The 2023 North Dakota State Bison women's soccer team represented North Dakota State University during the 2023 NCAA Division I women's soccer season. The Bison were led by sixth-year head coach Mike Regan, and played their home games at Dacotah Field in Fargo, North Dakota.
The Bison finished the year with a 5–6–6 overall record and a 1–3–4 conference record good enough to finish just outside the 6-team Summit League tournament field.

== Previous season ==
The Bison finished the 2022 season with a 4–5–0 record in Summit League play, and an 8–9–3 record overall. NDSU finished the season fifth and made the Summit League tournament. They lost to Oral Roberts in the quarterfinals to be eliminated from contention.

== Team Personnel ==
=== Roster ===
Note: Flags indicate national team as defined under FIFA eligibility rules; some limited exceptions apply. Players may hold more than one non-FIFA nationality.

No.	Pos.	Nation	Player
0	GK	USA	Payton Mulberry (Sophomore)
00	GK	USA	Hannah Stipp (Freshman)
1	GK	USA	Abby Wilkinson (Senior)
2	FW	USA	Paige Goaley (Senior)
4	MF	CAN	Devon Kavanagh (Sophomore)
5	DF	USA	Kaitlyn Hanson (Senior)
6	MF	USA	Gabby Sangillo (RS Sophomore)
7	DF	USA	Cadence Kline (Sophomore)
8	MF	USA	Kelsey Kallio (Senior)
9	MF	USA	Elana Webber (Senior)
10	DF	USA	Madison Majewski (Junior)
11	MF	USA	Olivia Watson (Junior)
12	DF	USA	Izzy Smith (RS Freshman)

No.	Pos.	Nation	Player
13	FW	USA	Madalyn Grate (Junior)
14	DF	USA	McKenna Strand (Senior)
16	DF	USA	Ashleigh Heely (Senior)
19	DF/MF	USA	Ellie Sanchez (Freshman)
20	DF/MF	USA	Amaya Garrett (Freshman)
21	DF	USA	Maddi Johnston (Freshman)
22	DF	USA	Tyreese Zacher (Freshman)
23	DF	USA	Jess Hanley (Senior)
24	MF	USA	Loretta Wacek (Junior)
25	FW	USA	Olivia Lovick (Senior)
27	MF	USA	Alicia Nead (Senior)
28	FW	USA	Sidney Armstrong (Freshman)
30	MF	USA	Hannah Arnold (Freshman)

=== Coaching staff ===
Position	Staff
Head coach	Mike Regan
Assistant Coach	Allison Mack
Assistant Coach	Chris Higgins
Director of Soccer Operations	Emily Savona

== Schedule ==
Date Time, TV	Rank^{#}	Opponent^{#}	Result	Record	Site (Attendance) City, State
Exhibition
August 7*; 6:00 p.m.		at Minnesota	L 0–2	–	Elizabeth Lyle Robbie Stadium; Falcon Heights, MN
August 14*; 6:30 p.m.		Manitoba	W 2–0	–	Dacotah Field (100); Fargo, ND
Non-conference Regular Season
August 17*; 6:30 p.m.		Boise State	T 1–1	0–0–1	Dacotah Field (152); Fargo, ND
August 20*; 1:00 p.m.		Montana	L 1–3	0–1–1	Dacotah Field (215); Fargo, ND
August 25*; 3:00 p.m.		Austin Peay	W 4–1	1–1–1	Dacotah Field (130); Fargo, ND
August 27*; 1:00 p.m.		at Drake	L 0–2	1–2–1	Cownie Soccer Complex (158); Des Moines, IA
August 31*; 6:00 p.m.		at Coastal Carolina	W 1–0	2–2–1	CCU Soccer Stadium (102); Conway, SC
September 3*; 12:00 p.m.		at The Citadel	T 1–1	2–2–2	Washington Light Infantry Field (100); Charleston, SC
September 8*; 6:30 p.m.		Northern Colorado	W 1–0	3–2–2	Dacotah Field (167); Fargo, ND
September 10*; 1:00 p.m.		Creighton	L 2–3	3–3–2	Dacotah Field (155); Fargo, ND
September 15*; 6:30 p.m.		Arkansas-Pine Bluff	W 3–0	4–3–2	Dacotah Field (384); Fargo, ND
Summit League Regular Season
September 21; 6:30 pm		Kansas City	T 1–1	4–3–3 (0–0–1)	Dacotah Field (108); Fargo, ND
September 24; 1:00 pm		Omaha	T 2–2	4–3–4 (0–0–2)	Dacotah Field (60); Fargo, ND
September 28; 6:00 pm		at South Dakota State	L 0–1	4–4–4 (0–1–2)	Fishbach Soccer Park (297); Brookings, SD
October 1; 1:00 pm		at St. Thomas	T 0–0	4–4–5 (0–1–3)	South Field (494); St. Paul, MN
October 5; 7:00 pm		at Oral Roberts	L 0–1	4–5–5 (0–2–3)	Case Soccer Complex (800); Tulsa, OK
October 8; 4:00 pm		North Dakota	T 0–0	4–5–6 (0–2–4)	Dacotah Field (353); Fargo, ND
October 15; 1:00 pm		at South Dakota	L 1–2	4–6–6 (0–3–4)	First Bank & Trust Soccer Complex (250); Vermillion, SD
October 19; 6:30 pm		Denver	W 1–0	5–6–6 (1–3–4)	Dacotah Field (201); Fargo, ND
*Non-conference game. ^{#}Rankings from United Soccer Coaches. (#) Tournament seedings in parentheses. All times are in CDT.

== Awards and honors ==
=== Summit League Player of the Week ===
Week	Player(s) of the Week	School
Sept 25	Kelsey Kallio	North Dakota State

=== End of the Year Awards ===
- Summit League Goalkeeper of the Year
  - Abby Wilkinson, Sr.
- All-Summit League First Team
  - Abby Wilkinson, GK - Sr.
- Summit League All-Newcomer Team
  - Amaya Garrett, D - Fr.
