= 2022 Summit League women's soccer season =

- League: NCAA Division I
- Teams: 10

Regular Season
- Regular season champions: Denver

2022 Summit League Tournament
- Champions: Omaha
- Runners-up: Oral Roberts

Seasons
- ← 2021 2023 →

2022 Summit League women's soccer standings
	Conf.						Overall
Team	W		L		T	PCT	W		L		T	PCT
Denver ‍†‍‍	8	–	0	–	1	.944	11	–	4	–	4	.684
South Dakota St ‍‍‍	7	–	0	–	2	.889	13	–	1	–	5	.816
Omaha ‍‍‡‍^{y}	4	–	2	–	3	.611	7	–	9	–	6	.455
Oral Roberts ‍‍‍	4	–	5	–	0	.444	10	–	9	–	3	.523
North Dakota St ‍‍‍	4	–	5	–	0	.444	8	–	9	–	3	.475
South Dakota ‍‍‍	3	–	4	–	2	.444	4	–	9	–	5	.361
North Dakota ‍‍‍	3	–	4	–	2	.444	7	–	9	–	4	.450
St. Thomas* ‍‍‍	2	–	6	–	1	.278	6	–	8	–	3	.441
Kansas City ‍‍‍	1	–	5	–	3	.278	2	–	11	–	5	.250
Western Illinois ‍‍‍	2	–	7	–	0	.222	4	–	10	–	3	.324
† – Conference champion ‡ – 2022 Summit League Tournament champion y – Invited to the NCAA Tournament * Ineligible for the 2022 NCAA tournament due to transition from Division III; As of December 6, 2022; Rankings from United Soccer Coaches Poll; Source:Summit League

The 2022 Summit League women's soccer season started non-conference play on August 10, 2022, and began conference play on September 23, 2022. The regular season ended on October 23, 2022. The Summit League tournament began on October 28, 2022 and ended on November 5, 2022 with Omaha winning the championship game in penalties. The Mavericks then went on to the NCAA tournament and lost to Notre Dame.

== Conference Changes ==
Following last year's tournament, the conference announced that the 2022 tournament would expand to six teams.

== Head coaches ==
=== Coaching Changes ===
==== Oral Roberts ====
On November 4, 2021, Oral Roberts head coach Roger Bush resigned and was replaced on December 10, 2021 by coach Austin Risenhoover.

==== Western Illinois ====
On February 15, 2022, Western Illinois announced Josee Primeau was promoted to head coach from her previous role within Dr. Eric Johnson's staff, the previous coach.

=== Coaches ===
Team	Head Coach	Previous Job	Years At School	Record at School	Summit League Record	Summit League Titles	NCAA Tournaments
Denver	Jeff Hooker	No Previous Job	30	393-163-53	194-34-16	4	11
Kansas City	Jess Smith	KC Fusion SC (Director of Girls)	3	10-25-1	8-16-1	0	0
Omaha	Tim Walters	Omaha (Men - Assistant)	6	36-45-12	23-19-6	1	1
North Dakota	Chris Logan	Northern Iowa	6	33-44-8	13-25-1	0	0
North Dakota State	Mike Regan	Indiana (Assistant)	5	35-43-8	23-24-3	0	0
Oral Roberts	Austin Risenhoover	California (Assistant)	1	0-0-0	0-0-0	0	0
St. Thomas	Sheila McGill	St. Catherine (Assistant)	16	158-73-29^	2-7-0	0	0^^
South Dakota	Michael Thomas	Cal State Fullerton (Assistant)	5	37-27-9	24-10-1	0	0
South Dakota State	Brock Thompson	South Dakota State (Assistant)	6	67-20-12	40-3-4	2	2
Western Illinois	Josee Primeau	Western Illinois (Assistant)	1	0-0-0	0-0-0	0	0

Notes:

- Year at school includes 2022 season.
- Overall and Summit League records are from the time at their current school and through the end of the 2021 season.
- NCAA tournament appearances are from the time at current school only.

^154 wins, 62 losses, and 28 ties at the Division III level

^^6 NCAA tournament appearances at the Division III level

== Preseason Awards ==
The Preseason Summit League women's soccer polls were released on August 16, 2022.

=== Preseason women's soccer polls ===
First Place Votes in Parentheses

1. Denver (6) - 78
2. South Dakota State (4) - 76
3. Omaha - 63
4. South Dakota - 57
5. Western Illinois - 45
6. Kansas City - 37
7. Oral Roberts - 37
8. St. Thomas - 26
9. North Dakota State - 17
10. North Dakota - 14

== Regular season ==
=== Conference standings ===
		Conference		Overall		
Rank	Team	Record	Points	Record	Percent	Tiebreaker
1	Denver	8-0-1	25	11-4-4	0.684	
2	South Dakota State	7-0-2	23	13-1-5	0.816	
3	Omaha	4-2-3	15	7-9-6	0.455	
4	Oral Roberts	4-5-0	12	10-9-3	0.523	Head-to-head over NDSU
5	North Dakota State	4-5-0	12	8-9-3	0.475	
6	South Dakota	3-4-2	11	4-9-5	0.361	Head-to-head over UND
7	North Dakota	3-4-2	11	7-9-4	0.450	
8	St. Thomas	2-6-1	7	6-8-3	0.441	
9	Kansas City	1-5-3	6	2-11-5	0.250	
10	Western Illinois	2-7-0	6	4-10-3	0.324	

=== Conference Matrix ===
	Denver	Kansas City	North Dakota	North Dakota State	Omaha	Oral Roberts	St. Thomas	South Dakota	South Dakota State	Western Illinois
vs. Denver	–	0–1	0–1	0–1	0–1	0–1	0–1	0–1	0–0-1	0–1
vs. Kansas City	1–0	–	0–0-1	1–0	0–0-1	1–0	0–0-1	0–1	1–0	0–1
vs. North Dakota	1–0	0–0-1	–	1–0	0–0-1	1–0	1–0	1–0	1–0	0–1
vs. North Dakota State	1–0	0–1	0–1	–	1–0	1–0	1–0	0–1	1–0	0–1
vs. Omaha	1–0	0–0-1	0–0-1	0–1	–	0–1	0–1	0–0-1	1–0	0–1
vs. Oral Roberts	1–0	0–1	0–1	0–1	1–0	–	1–0	1–0	0–0	0–1
vs. St. Thomas	1–0	0–0-1	1–0	0–1	1–0	0–1	–	1–0	1–0	1–0
vs. South Dakota	1–0	1–0	0–1	1–0	0–0-1	0–1	0–1	–	0–0-1	0–1
vs. South Dakota State	0–0-1	0–1	0–1	0–1	0–1	0–1	0–1	0–0-1	–	0–1
vs. Western Illinois	1–0	0–0	1–0	1–0	1–0	1–0	0–1	1–0	1–0	–
Total	0–0	0–0	0–0	0–0	0–0	0–0	0–0	0–0	0–0	0–0

=== Players of the Week ===
Week	Offensive Player of the Week	School	Defensive Player of the Week	School
August 22	Amy Andrews	Western Illinois	Nerea Arrazola	Denver
August 29	Annaliese Guisto	Oral Roberts	Kaycee Manding	South Dakota State
September 6	Cece Limongi	South Dakota State	Jocelyn Tanner	South Dakota State (2)
September 12	Sami Feller	Denver	Ashleigh Heely	North Dakota State
September 19	Katherine Jones	South Dakota State (2)	Abby Wilkinson	North Dakota State (2)
September 26	McKenna Lehman	St. Thomas	Nerea Arrazola (2)	Denver (2)
October 3	Hannah Olson	North Dakota	Madi Livingston	North Dakota
October 10	Maya Hansen	South Dakota State (2)	Gabrielle Abbey	Oral Roberts
October 17	Laney Murdzek	South Dakota State (3)	Abby Wilkinson (2)	North Dakota State (3)
October 24	Kaitlyn Glover	Denver (2)	Rachel Preston	South Dakota State

=== Record against other conferences ===
Power 7 Conferences	Record	Power 7 Conferences	Record
ACC	None	American	0-1-1
Big East	0-3-1	Big Ten	0-2-0
Big 12	1-4-1	Pac-12	0-4-2
SEC	0-0-1	Major 7 Total	1-14-6
Other Division I Conferences	Record	Other Division I Conferences	Record
Atlantic 10	0-2-0	ASUN	0-2-0
America East	None	Big Sky	4-9-5
Big South	None	Big West	None
Colonial	None	Conference USA	0-1-0
Horizon League	3-1-2	Ivy League	None
MAAC	None	MAC	0-1-1
MEAC	None	MVC	6-4-3
MWC	1-3-3	NEC	None
OVC	3-0-0	Patriot League	None
SoCon	None	Southland	1-0-0
SWAC	3-0-1	Sun Belt	0-1-1
WAC	4-0-1	WCC	1-0-0
Other Division I Total			26-24-17
NCAA Division I Total			27-38-23
NCAA Division II Total			3-0-0
NCAA Division III Total			None
NAIA Total			2-0-0
NCCAA Total			1-0-0
Total Non-Conference Record			33-38-23

=== All-League Honors ===
Honor	Recipient
Offensive Player of the Year	Maya Hansen, South Dakota State
Midfielder of the Year	Sami Feller, Denver
Defensive Player of the Year	Devan McSwain, Denver
Goalkeeper of the Year	Jocelyn Tanner, South Dakota State
Newcomer of the Year	Mariah Nguyen, St. Thomas
Coach of the Year	Jeff Hooker, Denver
All-Summit League First Team	Amy Andrews (F), Western Illinois
All-Summit League First Team	Sami Feller (MF), Denver
All-Summit League First Team	Kaitlyn Glover (MF), Denver
All-Summit League First Team	Maya Hansen (F), South Dakota State
All-Summit League First Team	Camryn MacMillan (F), Denver
All-Summit League First Team	Karlee Manding (MF), South Dakota State
All-Summit League First Team	Kaycee Manding (D), South Dakota State
All-Summit League First Team	Devan McSwain (D), Denver
All-Summit League First Team	Laney Murdzek (MF), South Dakota State
All-Summit League First Team	Jocelyn Tanner (GK), South Dakota State
All-Summit League First Team	Regan Zimmers (D), Omaha
All-Summit League Second Team	Reagan Anderson (MF), South Dakota State
All-Summit League Second Team	Nerea Arrazola (GK), Denver
All-Summit League Second Team	Riley Baker (D), Denver
All-Summit League Second Team	Jordan Crockett (D), Denver
All-Summit League Second Team	Paige Goaley (F), North Dakota State
All-Summit League Second Team	Addisyn Hyrup (F), Denver
All-Summit League Second Team	Hayley Lindaman (D), South Dakota State
All-Summit League Second Team	Madi Livingston (GK), North Dakota
All-Summit League Second Team	Avery Murdzek (MF), South Dakota State
All-Summit League Second Team	Hannah Olson (F), North Dakota
All-Summit League Second Team	Grace Ostergaard (MF), Omaha
All-Summit League Honorable Mention	Gabrielle Abbey (D), Oral Roberts
All-Summit League Honorable Mention	Annie Bantner (GK), St. Thomas
All-Summit League Honorable Mention	Hannah Gallegos (D), Denver
All-Summit League Honorable Mention	Samantha Guzman (MF), Oral Roberts
All-Summit League Honorable Mention	Cece Limongi (F), South Dakota State
All-Summit League Honorable Mention	Sophia Limongi (D), Kansas City
All-Summit League Honorable Mention	Rachel Preston (D), South Dakota State
All-Summit League Honorable Mention	Taylor Ravelo (D), South Dakota
All-Summit League Honorable Mention	Julia Thasaphong (F), Oral Roberts
All-Summit League Honorable Mention	Jordyn West (D), Omaha
All-Summit League Honorable Mention	Abby Wilkinson (GK), North Dakota State
Summit League All-Newcomer Team	Lindsey Birch (D), Omaha
Summit League All-Newcomer Team	Lauren Eckerle (MF), South Dakota State
Summit League All-Newcomer Team	Ariana Fresquez (D), Oral Roberts
Summit League All-Newcomer Team	Emma Konsmo (GK), Omaha
Summit League All-Newcomer Team	Abril Lucio (MF), Oral Roberts
Summit League All-Newcomer Team	Sarah McCracken (MF), North Dakota
Summit League All-Newcomer Team	Madelyn Muhr (D), Kansas City
Summit League All-Newcomer Team	Mariah Nguyen (F), St. Thomas
Summit League All-Newcomer Team	Madison Page (F), Kansas City
Summit League All-Newcomer Team	Julia Thasaphong (F), Oral Roberts
Summit League All-Newcomer Team	Elana Webber (MF), North Dakota State

== Conference Tournament ==
Quarterfinals; October 28, 2022
4	Oral Roberts (a.e.t.)	2
5	North Dakota State	1
3	Omaha	1
6	North Dakota	0

Semifinals; October 30, 2022
1	Denver	0 (2)
4	Oral Roberts (PK's)	0 (3)
2	South Dakota State	0
3	Omaha	1

Final; November 5, 2022
4	Oral Roberts	0 (1)
3	Omaha (PK's)	0 (3)
