= Tatumn Milazzo =

American soccer player (born 1998)

- Milazzo with the Utah Royals in 2026

Personal information
- Full name: Tatumn Marie Milazzo
- Date of birth: April 17, 1998 (age 28)
- Place of birth: Orland Park, Illinois, United States
- Height: 5 ft 7 in (1.70 m)
- Position: Defender

Team information
- Current team: Utah Royals
- Number: 2

Youth career
- Chicago Eclipse Select

College career
Years	Team	Apps	(Gls)
2016–2019	South Carolina Gamecocks	80	(3)

Senior career*
Years	Team	Apps	(Gls)
2021–2024	Chicago Red Stars	54	(4)
2025–	Utah Royals	22	(4)
- * Club domestic league appearances and goals as of 04:22, November 10, 2026 (UTC)

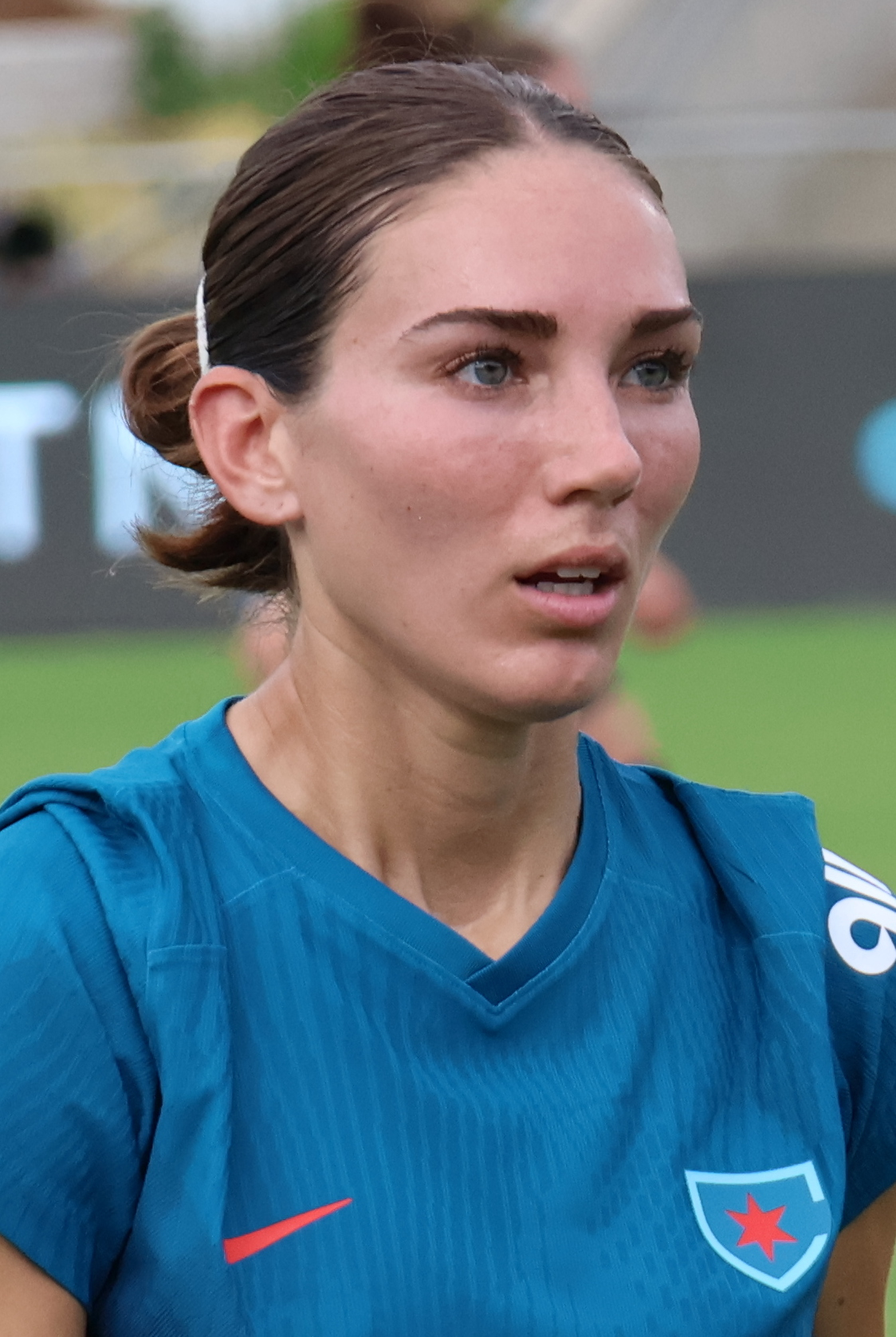
Milazzo with the Chicago Red Stars in 2024

Tatumn Marie Milazzo (born April 17, 1998) is an American professional soccer player who plays as a defender for the Utah Royals of the National Women's Soccer League (NWSL). She played college soccer for the South Carolina Gamecocks and began her professional career with the Chicago Red Stars in 2021, earning second-team NWSL Best XI honors in 2022.

== Early life ==
Born in Orland Park, Illinois, Milazzo attended Victor J. Andrew High School. She played her youth club soccer for Chicago Eclipse Select under eventual Chicago Red Stars head coach Rory Dames. With the Eclipse, she helped the team win the 2013 U.S. Youth Soccer National Championship and the Illinois State Cup in 2012, 2013, and 2014.

== College career ==
Milazzo enrolled at the University of South Carolina and played college soccer for the South Carolina Gamecocks. During her time with the Gamecocks from 2016 through 2019, Milazzo played 80 matches, scoring 3 goals. She also was part of the Gamecocks side that won three Southeastern Conference titles, in 2016, 2017, and 2019. In 2017, she helped the Gamecocks qualify for their first Women's College Cup appearance, where they were defeated by Stanford Cardinal in the semi-finals. Near the end of her senior year with the Gamecocks, Milazzo tore her anterior cruciate ligament (ACL), but she elected to continue playing soccer despite her knee injury.

== Club career ==
=== Chicago Red Stars, 2021–2024 ===
On February 1, 2021, Milazzo was announced as part of the pre-season squad for National Women's Soccer League club Chicago Red Stars. On April 5, 2021, Milazzo joined the Chicago Red Stars as a supplemental roster player. She made her professional debut for the club on April 9, 2021, against the Houston Dash in the NWSL Challenge Cup, coming on as an 87th-minute substitute as the Red Stars drew 0–0. Milazzo netted her first professional goal on October 10, 2021, scoring from outside the box in a 3–2 defeat at the hands of the OL Reign. Later in the season, the Chicago Red Stars progressed to the NWSL Championship game, which Milazzo played in. She completed her rookie season with 14 appearances and 936 minutes played for the Red Stars.

In 2022, Milazzo starred in 23 games and scored 2 goals, one against NJ/NY Gotham FC and the other against the Kansas City Current. In June, she was named to the 2022 June Best XI of the Month. She was a starter in the Red Stars' playoff game, which the team lost 2–1 in extra time to San Diego Wave FC. For her performances throughout the season, Milazzo was later named to the NWSL Best XI Second Team. She also extended her contract with the Red Stars through the 2024 NWSL Season, with an additional one-year option in the deal.

During the 2023 season, Milazzo played 21 games and tallied 1 goal, which was scored in a 1–1 draw with the North Carolina Courage on August 27, 2023. In 2024, Milazzo started her season off with a bang, making goal-line clearances in two consecutive games. Both of Milazzo's clearances won NWSL Save of the Week honors, marking the second-ever time a NWSL field player won the award in back-to-back weeks.

=== Utah Royals, 2025– ===
On January 13, 2025, the Utah Royals announced the signing of Milazzo on a two-year contract. She tore her ACL during training in late March and missed the entire season. After her ACL recovery, she made a goalscoring debut for the Royals, starting and scoring a header in a season-opening 2–1 loss to the Kansas City Current on March 14, 2026.

== Career statistics ==
As of January 13, 2025

Appearances and goals by club, season and competition
Club	Season	League			Cup (Note: Includes the NWSL Challenge Cup)		Playoffs (Note: Includes NWSL Playoffs)		Total	
Club	Season	Division	Apps	Goals	Apps	Goals	Apps	Goals	Apps	Goals
Chicago Red Stars	2021	NWSL	11	1	2	0	3	0	16	1
Chicago Red Stars	2022	NWSL	22	2	6	0	1	0	29	2
Chicago Red Stars	2023	NWSL	21	1	4	0	—		25	1
Chicago Red Stars	2024	NWSL	17	0	3	0	0	0	20	0
Utah Royals	2025	NWSL	—	—	—		—		—	—
Career total			74	4	12	0	4	0	90	4

== Honors and awards ==
South Carolina Gamecocks

- Southeastern Conference: 2016, 2017, 2019

Individual

- Second-team NWSL Best XI: 2022
- Second-team All-SEC: 2017
