= 2022 North Dakota State Bison women's soccer team =

American college soccer season

2022 North Dakota State Bison women's soccer
- Conference: Summit League
- Record: 8–9–3 (4–5–0 Summit League)
- Head coach: Mike Regan
- Home stadium: Dacotah Field

2022 Summit League women's soccer standings
	Conf.						Overall
Team	W		L		T	PCT	W		L		T	PCT
Denver ‍†‍‍	8	–	0	–	1	.944	11	–	4	–	4	.684
South Dakota St ‍‍‍	7	–	0	–	2	.889	13	–	1	–	5	.816
Omaha ‍‍‡‍^{y}	4	–	2	–	3	.611	7	–	9	–	6	.455
Oral Roberts ‍‍‍	4	–	5	–	0	.444	10	–	9	–	3	.523
North Dakota St ‍‍‍	4	–	5	–	0	.444	8	–	9	–	3	.475
South Dakota ‍‍‍	3	–	4	–	2	.444	4	–	9	–	5	.361
North Dakota ‍‍‍	3	–	4	–	2	.444	7	–	9	–	4	.450
St. Thomas* ‍‍‍	2	–	6	–	1	.278	6	–	8	–	3	.441
Kansas City ‍‍‍	1	–	5	–	3	.278	2	–	11	–	5	.250
Western Illinois ‍‍‍	2	–	7	–	0	.222	4	–	10	–	3	.324
† – Conference champion ‡ – 2022 Summit League Tournament champion y – Invited to the NCAA Tournament * Ineligible for the 2022 NCAA tournament due to transition from Division III; As of December 6, 2022; Rankings from United Soccer Coaches Poll; Source:Summit League

The 2022 North Dakota State Bison women's soccer team represented North Dakota State University during the 2022 NCAA Division I women's soccer season. The Bison play in the Summit League.
NDSU made the Summit League tournament as the fifth seed. They lost to Oral Roberts in the quarterfinals to be eliminated from contention. The Bison finished the season with an 8–9–3 record and a 4–5–0 Summit League record, good for fifth in the conference.

== Previous season ==
The Bison finished the 2021 season with a 3–6 record in Summit League play, and a 3–12–1 record overall. NDSU finished the season 8th in the conference and did not make the Summit League tournament.

== Team Personnel ==
=== Roster ===
Note: Flags indicate national team as defined under FIFA eligibility rules; some limited exceptions apply. Players may hold more than one non-FIFA nationality.

No.	Pos.	Nation	Player
0	GK	USA	Payton Mulberry (Freshman)
00	GK	USA	Sofia Howe (Senior)
1	GK	USA	Abby Wilkinson (Junior)
2	FW	USA	Paige Goaley (Junior)
3	DF/MF	USA	Katie Pagel (Sophomore)
4	MF	CAN	Devon Kavanagh (Freshman)
5	DF	USA	Kaitlyn Hanson (Junior)
6	MF	USA	Gabby Sangillo (Sophomore)
7	DF	USA	Cadence Kline (Freshman)
8	FW/MF	USA	Kelsey Kallio (Junior)
9	MF	USA	Elana Webber (Sophomore)
10	MF	USA	Josie Fieldman (Sophomore)
11	FW/MF	USA	Olivia Watson (Sophomore)

No.	Pos.	Nation	Player
12	FW	USA	Isabelle Smith (Freshman)
13	FW/MF	USA	Madalyn Grate (Sophomore)
14	DF	USA	McKenna Strand (Senior)
15	MF	USA	Kate Swanis (Senior)
16	MF	USA	Ashleigh Heely (Junior)
17	DF	USA	Dani Stuber (Senior)
18	MF	USA	Payton Jo Armijo (Senior)
20	MF	USA	Aliya Owens (Junior)
21	MF	USA	Lavin Douglass (Senior)
23	DF/MF	USA	Jess Hanley (Junior)
24	FW/MF	USA	Loretta Wacek (Sophomore)
25	FW	USA	Olivia Lovick (Junior)
27	MF	USA	Alicia Nead (Junior)

=== Coaching staff ===
Position	Staff
Head coach	Mike Regan
Assistant Coach	Allison Mack
Assistant Coach	Chris Higgins
Director of Soccer Operations	Emily Savona

== Schedule ==
Date Time, TV	Rank^{#}	Opponent^{#}	Result	Record	Site (Attendance) City, State
Exhibition
August 11*; 6:00 p.m.		Viterbo	W 7–0	–	Dacotah Field; Fargo, ND
Non-conference Regular Season
August 19*; 7:30 p.m.		vs. Tarleton	T 1–1	0–0–1	Jaguar Park (101); Thibodaux, LA
August 21*; 11:00 a.m.		at Southern	T 0–0	0–0–2	Jaguar Park (110); Thibodaux, LA
August 27*; 1:30 p.m.		vs. Utah Tech^	W 2–0	1–0–2	South Field (160); St. Paul, MN
August 29*; 1:30 p.m.		vs. Chicago State	W 4–1	2–0–2	South Field (49); St. Paul, MN
September 2*; 5:00 p.m.		at Wyoming	L 1–3	2–1–2	Madrid Sports Complex (272); Laramie, WY
September 4*; 2:00 p.m.		at Northern Colorado	L 0–5	2–2–2	Jackson Stadium (423); Greeley, CO
September 9*; 5:00 p.m.		Green Bay	W 1–0	3–2–2	Dacotah Field (522); Fargo, ND
September 11*; 1:00 p.m.		Drake	W 1–0	4–2–2	Dacotah Field (407); Fargo, ND
September 16*; 8:30 p.m.		at Idaho	T 0–0	4–2–3	Kibbie Dome (288); Moscow, ID
September 18*; 11:30 a.m.		at Montana	L 0–3	4–3–3	South Campus Stadium (316); Missoula, MT
Summit League Regular Season
September 23; 8:00 p.m.		at Denver	L 0–2	4–4–3 (0–1–0)	CIBER Field at the University of Denver Soccer Stadium (1,837); Denver, CO
September 25; 1:00 p.m.		at Omaha	L 1–2	4–5–3 (0–2–0)	Al F. Caniglia Field (365); Omaha, NE
September 30; 6:00 p.m.		St. Thomas	L 2–3	4–6–3 (0–3–0)	Dacotah Field (241); Fargo, ND
October 2; 1:00 p.m.		Western Illinois	W 4–0	5–6–3 (1–3–0)	Dacotah Field (102); Fargo, ND
October 7; 7:00 p.m.		at Kansas City	W 3–1	6–6–3 (2–3–0)	Durwood Soccer Stadium (204); Kansas City, MO
October 9; 1:00 p.m.		at Oral Roberts	L 0–2	6–7–3 (2–4–0)	Case Soccer Complex (319); Tulsa, OK
October 16; 1:00 p.m.		at North Dakota	W 2–0	7–7–3 (3–4–0)	Bronson Field (160); Grand Forks, ND
October 21; 6:00 p.m.		South Dakota	W 4–1	8–7–3 (4–4–0)	Dacotah Field (421); Fargo, ND
October 23; 1:00 p.m.		South Dakota State	L 0–2	8–8–3 (4–5–0)	Dacotah Field (563); Fargo, ND
Summit League tournament
October 28; 5:00 p.m.	(5)	vs. (4) Oral Roberts; Quarterfinals	L 1–2 2OT	8–9–3	CIBER Field at the University of Denver Soccer Stadium (121); Denver, CO
*Non-conference game. ^{#}Rankings from United Soccer Coaches. (#) Tournament seedings in parentheses. All times are in CDT.

^ – Utah Tech was known as Dixie State before 2022

== Season Honors ==
=== All-Summit League ===
==== Second Team ====
- Paige Goaley

==== Honorable Mention ====
- Abby Wilkinson

==== All-Newcomer Team ====
- Elana Webber

=== Summit League All-Tournament Team ===
- Katilyn Hanson
