= Brenna Ochoa =

American association football player

Personal information
- Full name: Brenna Rae Ochoa
- Date of birth: September 6, 1998 (age 28)
- Place of birth: Omaha, Nebraska, U.S.
- Height: 1.64 m (5 ft 5 in)
- Position: Defender

Team information
- Current team: Vittsjö GIK

College career
Years	Team	Apps	(Gls)
2016–2019	Nebraska Cornhuskers		

Brenna Rae Ochoa (born September 6, 1998) is an American soccer player who plays in defense for Vittsjö GIK in the Swedish Women's League.

She has previously played for OL Reign in the National Women's Soccer League, Fortuna Hjørring in the Danish Women's League and MSV Duisburg in the Women's Bundesliga.
