= Chardonnay Curran =

American soccer player (born 1999)

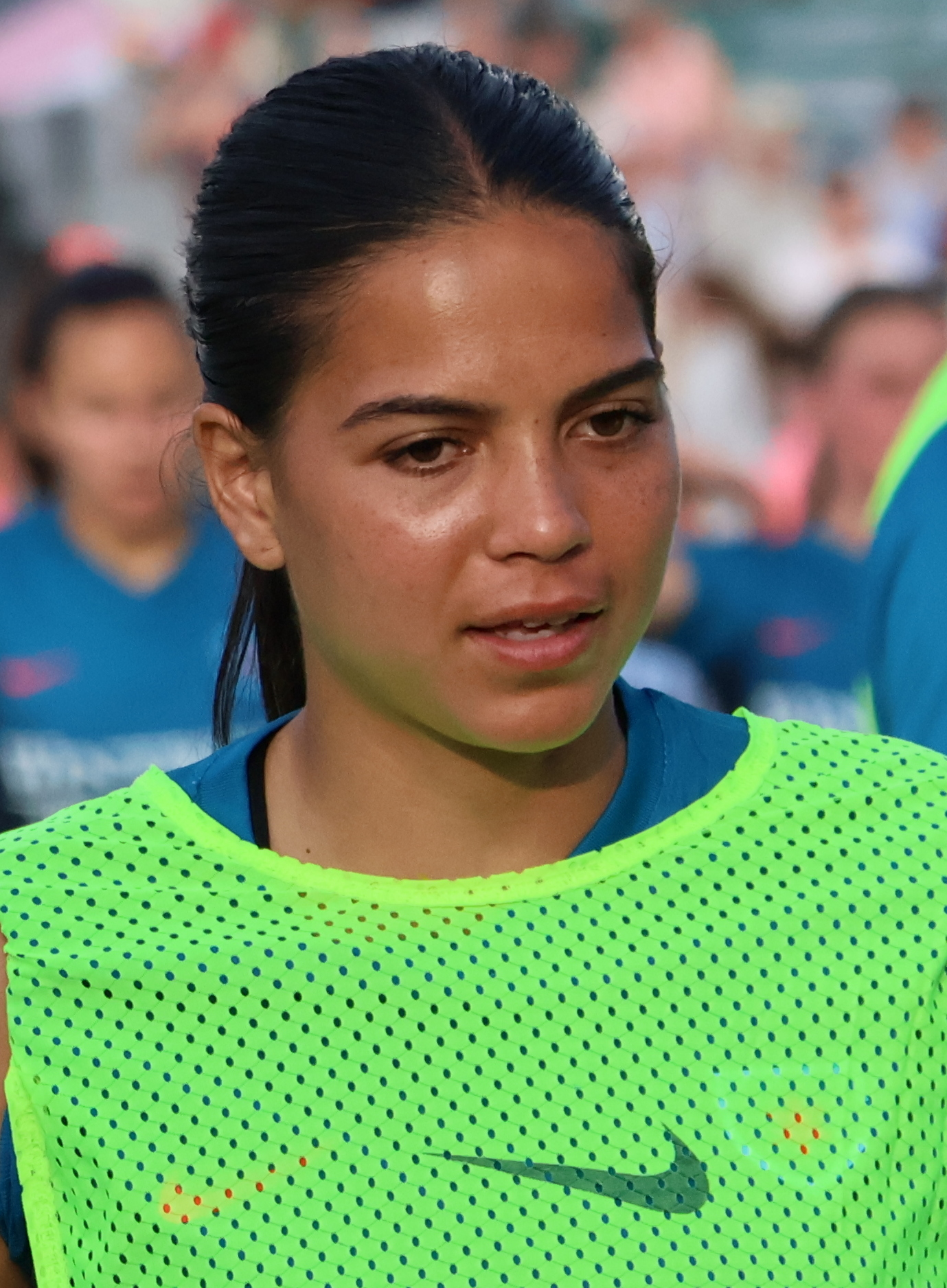
- Curran with the Chicago Red Stars in 2024

Personal information
- Full name: Chardonnay Matauaga Curran
- Date of birth: August 18, 1999 (age 27)
- Place of birth: ʻEwa Beach, Hawaii, U.S.
- Height: 5 ft 4 in (1.63 m)
- Position: Midfielder

Team information
- Current team: Rio Ave

Youth career
- Hawaii Rush

College career
| Years | Team | Apps | (Gls) |
| 2017–2021 | Oregon Ducks | 92 | (7) |

Senior career*
| Years | Team | Apps | (Gls) |
| 2022–2023 | Kansas City Current | 29 | (0) |
| 2024–2025 | Chicago Stars | 17 | (0) |
| 2025– | Rio Ave | 0 | (0) |
- * Club domestic league appearances and goals as of July 29, 2025

Chardonnay Matauaga Curran (born August 18, 1999) is a professional soccer player who plays as a midfielder for Portuguese Campeonato Nacional Feminino club Rio Ave. She played college soccer for the Oregon Ducks, where she set the program record for appearances. Born in the United States, she has committed to play for the Philippines national team.

== College career ==
Curran attended the University of Oregon, where she made 92 appearances and scored seven goals. She holds the school records for matches played, consecutive matches played, and starts. Three of her goals were game-winners. Curran took advantage of the NCAA's COVID eligibility extension to play a fifth year of collegiate soccer.

== Club career ==
=== Kansas City Current ===
Curran was selected 17th overall in the 2022 NWSL Draft by the Kansas City Current. She made 30 total appearances for the Current across two seasons, scoring her first professional goal, a game-winning tally in an international friendly against CF Monterrey, before being waived at the end of 2023.

=== Chicago Stars ===
In 2024, the Chicago Red Stars (later named Chicago Stars FC) acquired Curran's playing rights through the waiver wire process. She made 17 league appearances before departing from the club on July 29, 2025, via a mutual contract termination.

=== Rio Ave FC ===
On August 20, 2025, she signed with Rio Ave in the Campeonato Nacional Feminino (also known as Liga BPI), the top women's professional league in Portugal.

== International career ==
Curran has been called in to camps with United States youth teams. In 2018, she was summoned to an under-20 camp in the lead-up to the 2018 FIFA U-20 Women's World Cup.

On March 11, 2026, Curran received approval from FIFA to switch her international allegiance to the Philippines.

== Personal life ==
Curran is of Samoan, Filipino, Irish and German descent. She is the daughter of Marie and Joe Curran, and has three sisters, Charis, Charity and Charissa.
