= 2022 Summit League women's soccer tournament =

2022 Summit League Women's soccer tournament
- Classification: Division I
- Teams: 6
- Matches: 5
- Attendance: 1,686
- Site: Campus Sites
- Champions: Omaha (1st title)
- Winning coach: Tim Walters (1st title)
- MVP: Emma Konsmo (Omaha)
- Broadcast: Online (TheSummitLeague.org)
Summit League Women's soccer tournament
«2021	2023»

2022 Summit League women's soccer standings
	Conf.						Overall
Team	W		L		T	PCT	W		L		T	PCT
Denver ‍†‍‍	8	–	0	–	1	.944	11	–	4	–	4	.684
South Dakota St ‍‍‍	7	–	0	–	2	.889	13	–	1	–	5	.816
Omaha ‍‍‡‍^{y}	4	–	2	–	3	.611	7	–	9	–	6	.455
Oral Roberts ‍‍‍	4	–	5	–	0	.444	10	–	9	–	3	.523
North Dakota St ‍‍‍	4	–	5	–	0	.444	8	–	9	–	3	.475
South Dakota ‍‍‍	3	–	4	–	2	.444	4	–	9	–	5	.361
North Dakota ‍‍‍	3	–	4	–	2	.444	7	–	9	–	4	.450
St. Thomas* ‍‍‍	2	–	6	–	1	.278	6	–	8	–	3	.441
Kansas City ‍‍‍	1	–	5	–	3	.278	2	–	11	–	5	.250
Western Illinois ‍‍‍	2	–	7	–	0	.222	4	–	10	–	3	.324
* Ineligible for the 2022 NCAA tournament due to transition from Division III
† – Conference champion ‡ – 2022 Summit League Tournament champion y – Invited to the NCAA Tournament; As of December 6, 2022; Rankings from United Soccer Coaches Poll; Source:Summit League

The 2022 Summit League women's soccer tournament was the postseason women's soccer tournament for the Summit League held on October 28–30 and November 5, 2022. The five match tournament took place at various campus sites. The six-team single-elimination tournament consisted of three rounds based on seeding from regular season conference play. The South Dakota State Jackrabbits were the defending champions, but was unable to defend their title after losing to eventual champion Omaha in the semifinal match. This was Omaha's first ever Summit League women's soccer tournament title, and they earned the Summit League's automatic berth to the 2022 NCAA Division I Women's Soccer Tournament.

== Seeding ==
The top six of the ten teams competing during the regular season qualified for the 2022 tournament. Seeding is based on regular season conference records. Tiebreakers were used as needed. Oral Roberts was seeded higher than North Dakota State due to head-to-head tiebreaker. North Dakota received the sixth seed due to a head-to-head tiebreaker with South Dakota.

Seed	School	Conference Record	Points
1	Denver	8–0–1	25
2	South Dakota State	7–0–2	23
3	Omaha	4–2–3	15
4	Oral Roberts	4–5–0	12
5	North Dakota State	4–5–0	12
6	North Dakota	3–4–2	11

== Bracket ==
Quarterfinals; Friday, October 28
4	Oral Roberts (a.e.t.)	2
5	North Dakota State	1
3	Omaha	1
6	North Dakota	0

Semifinals; Sunday, October 30
1	Denver	0 (2)
4	Oral Roberts (PK's)	0 (3)
2	South Dakota State	0
3	Omaha	1

Final; Saturday, November 5
4	Oral Roberts	0 (1)
3	Omaha (PK's)	0 (3)

== Schedule ==
Schedule will include the quarterfinals and semifinals being played October 28–30 and the finals being played on November 5. The quarterfinal and semifinal rounds will be hosted by the top two seeds, the championship game will be hosted by the highest seed remaining.

=== Quarterfinals ===
October 28, 2022	#4 Oral Roberts	2–1 (a.e.t.)	#5 North Dakota State	Denver, CO
4:00 PM MT	Samantha See 31'; Samantha See 105'	Report	Paige Goaley 45'; Kelsey Kallio (yellow card) 99'; Jess Hanley (yellow card) 109'	Stadium: CIBER Field at the University of Denver Soccer Stadium; Attendance: 121; Referee: Adam Hotz; Assistant referees: Rob Bartczak; Kastriot Baruni; Fourth official: Federico Ruiz

October 28, 2022	#3 Omaha	1–0	#6 North Dakota	Brookings, SD
6:00 PM CT	Grace Ostergaard (yellow card) 41'; Mia Reedtz Rehde Olesen (yellow card) 73'; Emilie Erland 81'; Sophia Green (yellow card) 88'	Report		Stadium: Fishback Soccer Park; Attendance: 188; Referee: Sean Giza; Assistant referees: Sean Mallett; Andrew Wubben; Fourth official: Esad Omanovic

=== Semifinals ===
October 30, 2022	#1 Denver	0–0 (a.e.t.) (2–3 p)	#4 Oral Roberts	Denver, CO
1:00 PM MT		Report	Julia Thasasphong (yellow card) 55'; Kristi Keller (yellow card) 71'	Stadium: CIBER Field at the University of Denver Soccer Stadium; Attendance: 209; Referee: Marcelo Soto; Assistant referees: Adam Rice; Jacob Meyer; Fourth official: Adam Mueller
	Penalties
	Kaitlyn Glover (penalty scored); Addisyn Hyrup (penalty scored); Ella Frost (penalty missed); Lily O'Grady (penalty missed); Hannah Gallegos (penalty missed)		Samantha See (penalty scored); Abril Lucio (penalty missed); Samantha Guzman (penalty scored); Gabrielle Abbey (penalty scored)

October 30, 2022	#2 South Dakota State	0–1	#3 Omaha	Brookings, SD
3:00 PM CT	Hannah King (yellow card) 78'	Report	Grace Ostergaard 16'; Meg Nemnich (yellow card) 67'	Stadium: Fishback Soccer Park; Attendance: 420; Referee: Dimitar Chavdarov; Assistant referees: Tyler Dalsin; Soner Dogan; Fourth official: Scott Staiger

=== Final ===
November 5, 2022	#3 Omaha	0–0 (a.e.t.) (3–1 p)	#4 Oral Roberts	Omaha, NE
3:00 PM CT	Sophia Green (yellow card) 62'		Carson Arne (yellow card) 41'; Gabrielle Abbey (yellow card) 52'	Stadium: Caniglia Field; Attendance: 748; Referee: Khalaf Al Latayfeh; Assistant referees: Brent Wilson; Michael Barton; Fourth official: Matt Seem
	Penalties
	Reagan Bourgeois (penalty scored); Kaitlyn Cook (penalty scored); Marissa Gohr (penalty scored)		Samantha See (penalty missed); Abril Lucio (penalty missed); Samantha Guzman (penalty scored); Gabrielle Abbey (penalty missed)

== Statistics ==
=== Goalscorers ===
There were 5 goals scored in 5 matches, for an average of 1 goal per match (as of November 5, 2022).

2 goals

- Samantha See – Oral Roberts

1 goal

- Emilie Erland – Omaha
- Grace Ostergaard – Omaha
- Paige Goaley – North Dakota State

== All-Tournament Team ==
Player	Team
Emma Konsmo	Omaha
Emilie Erland	Omaha
Sophia Green	Omaha
Grace Ostergaard	Omaha
Gabrielle Abbey	Oral Roberts
Louisa Ramsauer	Oral Roberts
Samantha See	Oral Roberts
Katherine Jones	South Dakota State
Hayley Lindaman	South Dakota State
Ella Frost	Denver
Hannah Gallegos	Denver
Kaitlyn Hanson	North Dakota State
Amy Loeffler	North Dakota
