= Ella Stevens =

American soccer player (born 1997)

- Stevens with the Boston Legacy in 2026

Personal information
- Full name: Ella Hendley Stevens
- Date of birth: December 11, 1997 (age 28)
- Place of birth: Snellville, Georgia, United States
- Height: 5 ft 8 in (1.73 m)
- Position: Forward

Team information
- Current team: Boston Legacy
- Number: 10

Youth career
- –2016: Gwinnett SA

College career
Years	Team	Apps	(Gls)
2016–2019	Duke Blue Devils	91	(24)

Senior career*
Years	Team	Apps	(Gls)
2020–2023	Chicago Red Stars	46	(8)
2024–2025	Gotham FC	34	(7)
2026–	Boston Legacy	16	(0)

International career
- United States U17
- United States U19
2015	United States U20		
2018	United States U23		
- * Club domestic league appearances and goals as of 02:19, November 8, 2026 (UTC)

Ella Hendley Stevens (born December 11, 1997) is an American professional soccer player who plays as a forward for Boston Legacy FC of the National Women's Soccer League (NWSL). She played college soccer for the Duke Blue Devils before being drafted by the Chicago Red Stars in the 2020 NWSL College Draft.

== Early life ==
Stevens was born in Snellville, Georgia, to Chip Stevens and Celeste Baker, and has a younger brother. Her father played college soccer at Lander University. She played high school soccer for Grayson High School where she recorded 73 goals and 83 assists in four years. She played club soccer for Gwinnett Soccer Academy of the Elite Clubs National League (ECNL). She committed to play college soccer at Duke University in January 2014. In her senior year in 2015–16, she was named the national Gatorade Player of the Year as the country's best high school soccer player.

== College career ==
Stevens led the Duke Blue Devils with 10 goals and added six assists in her freshman season, including two goals and two assists over the first four rounds of the 2016 NCAA tournament. She received All-Atlantic Coast Conference (ACC) third team and ACC All-Freshman honors. In her sophomore year, scored five goals and led the team with 11 assists, helping Duke make the 2017 NCAA semifinals, and was second-team All-ACC. She was second in the ACC with 10 assists as a junior, adding one goal. In her senior year in 2019, she recorded eight goals and six assists, starting every game of the season, and was all-ACC for the fourth year in a row.

== Club career ==
=== Chicago Red Stars ===
Stevens was selected 24th overall in the 2020 NWSL College Draft by the Chicago Red Stars. She made her debut in the 2020 NWSL Challenge Cup on July 1, 2020, while on a short-term contract. She was signed to the roster on October 9.

Stevens made her first regular season start in the first game of the 2022 season, on April 30 against Racing Louisville, and scored her first professional goal in the first minute of the game. She recorded four goals and two assists in 19 appearances that season.

In the 2023 season, Stevens started 16 of 22 matches, scored four goals, and had one assist for the Red Stars, who finished the season at the bottom of the table.

=== Gotham FC ===
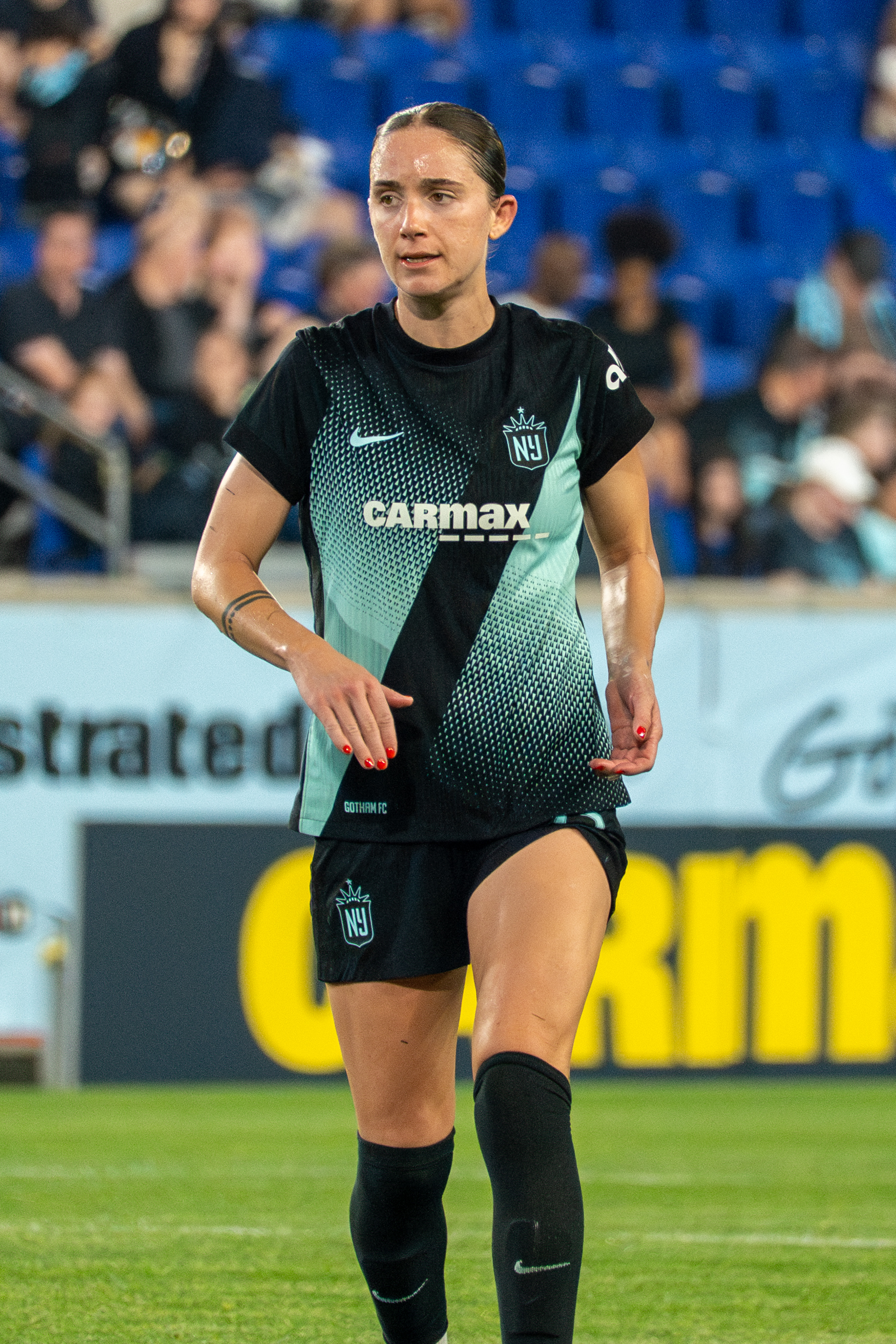
Ella Stevens with Gotham FC in 2025

On January 22, 2024, Stevens signed with NJ/NY Gotham FC on a two-year contract with an option for an additional year. She scored her first goal for Gotham in a 1–1 draw away against the San Diego Wave. A week later, she netted the winner in the 90th minute against former club Chicago Red Stars, making it 2–1, and celebrated by kissing her new club's badge. The next game, Stevens scored both goals in a 2–0 win over Bay FC. Stevens scored and provided two assists in a 3–0 win against Guadalajara in the 2024 NWSL x Liga MX Femenil Summer Cup group stage on August 2. She finished the regular season with 7 goals and 4 assists in 22 appearances (15 starts) as Gotham placed third in the standings.

On May 25, 2025, she played in the 2025 CONCACAF W Champions Cup final against Tigres, where Gotham won 1–0 to become the inaugural winners of the competition. At the end of the year, she departed from Gotham upon the expiration of her contract and was described by club chairman Yael Averbuch West as "a true professional and a joy to watch during her time at Gotham".

=== Boston Legacy ===
NWSL expansion club Boston Legacy FC announced on December 22, 2025, that they had signed Stevens to a two-year contract with a mutual option for a third year.

== International career ==
Stevens trained with the United States youth national teams at multiple age levels, starting at the under-14 level in 2011. She trained with the under-15 team in 2012 and the under-17 team in 2013. She was called up to the under-19 team in 2015. Later that year she represented the under-20 team at the 2015 CONCACAF Women's U-20 Championship, contributing a goal in the group stage against Haiti as the United States went on to win the tournament. She played friendlies with the under-23 team against NWSL clubs in the 2018 preseason.

Stevens received her first call-up to the senior national team in January 2025.

== Career statistics ==
As of January 13, 2026

Appearances and goals by club, season and competition
Club	Season	League			Cup (Note: Includes the NWSL Challenge Cup & NWSL x Liga MX Femenil Summer Cup)		Playoffs (Note: Includes NWSL Playoffs)		Other		Total	
Club	Season	Division	Apps	Goals	Apps	Goals	Apps	Goals	Apps	Goals	Apps	Goals
Chicago Red Stars	2020	NWSL	—		2	0	—		0 (Note: Includes the NWSL Fall Series)	0	2	0
Chicago Red Stars	2021	NWSL	5	0	1	0	0	0	—		6	0
Chicago Red Stars	2022	NWSL	19	4	5	0	1	0	—		25	4
Chicago Red Stars	2023	NWSL	22	4	4	0	—		—		26	4
Gotham FC	2024	NWSL	24	7	5	1	2	0	—		31	8
Gotham FC	2025	NWSL	10	0	—		0	0	—		10	0
Career total			80	15	17	1	3	0	0	0	100	16

== Honors ==
Gotham FC

- NWSL Championship: 2025
- CONCACAF W Champions Cup: 2024–25

Individual

- NWSL Player of the Month: August 2024
- NWSL Team of the Month: August 2024
