= Maximiliane Rall =

German footballer (born 1993)

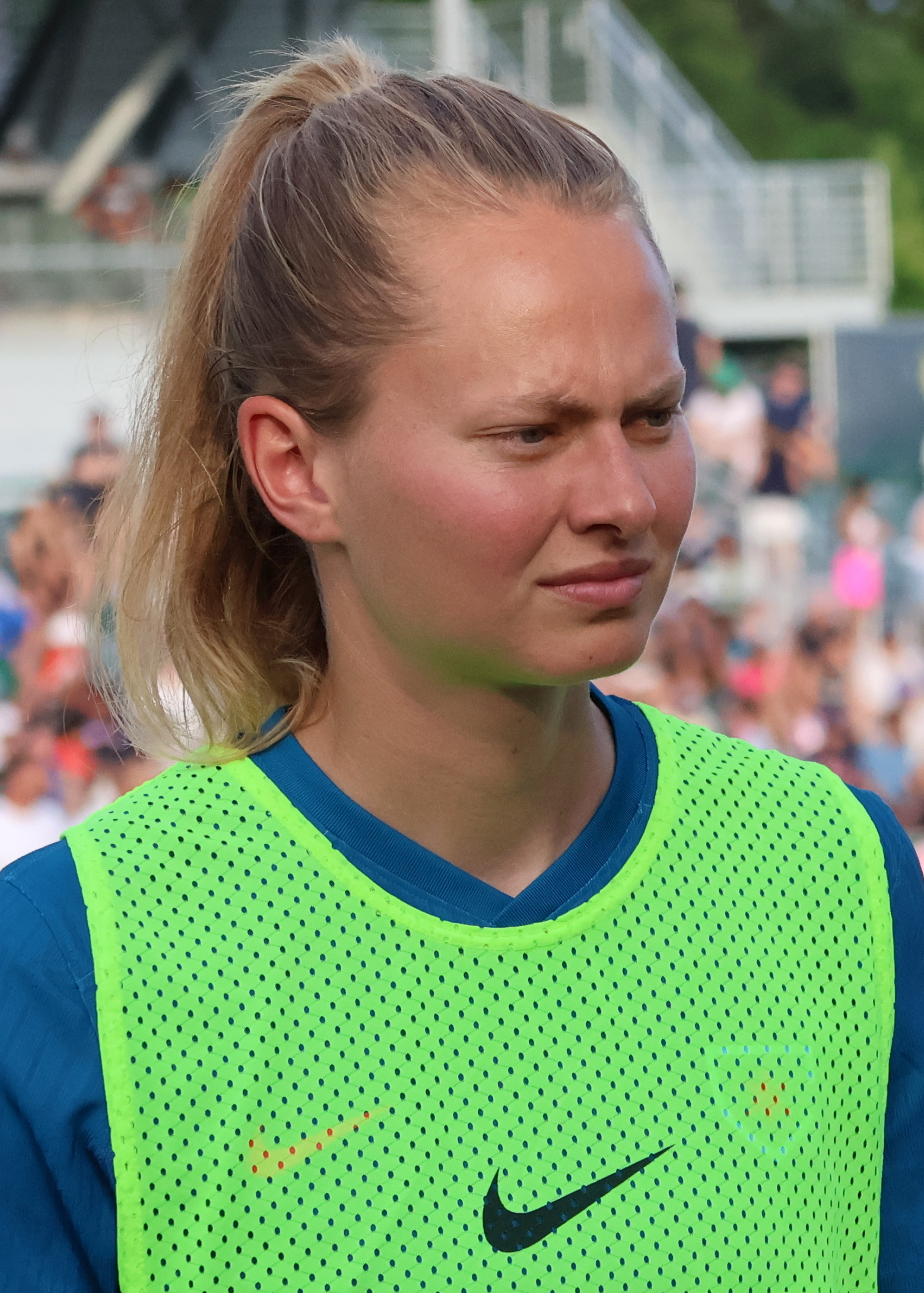
- Rall with the Chicago Red Stars in 2024

Personal information
- Date of birth: 18 November 1993 (age 33)
- Place of birth: Rottweil, Germany
- Height: 1.80 m (5 ft 11 in)
- Position: Defender

Team information
- Current team: VfB Stuttgart
- Number: 8

Youth career
- –2010: VfL Sindelfingen

Senior career*
Years	Team	Apps	(Gls)
2010–2014	VfL Sindelfingen	35	(2)
2015–2017	1899 Hoffenheim II	55	(13)
2017–2021	1899 Hoffenheim	85	(16)
2021–2023	Bayern München	40	(15)
2024	Chicago Red Stars	9	(1)
2025–	VfB Stuttgart	45	(15)

International career^{‡}
2018–2022	Germany	9	(0)
- * Club domestic league appearances and goals as of 22 November 2026 ‡ National team caps and goals as of 16:08, 11 November 2022 (UTC)

Maximiliane Rall (born 18 November 1993) is a German footballer who plays as a defender for VfB Stuttgart of the Frauen-Bundesliga and the Germany national team.

== Club career ==
Rall started playing football at the age of five with VfB Bösingen. In the summer of 2009, she and her teammate Natalie Hezel joined the B youth team at VfL Sindelfingen. There she moved up to the first team of VfL Sindelfingen in the summer of 2010. She made her debut in the 2nd Bundesliga South on 15 August 2010 against 1. FC Köln. After two seasons and 27 appearances, she and her team won the 2nd Bundesliga South championship in the 2011–12 season. On 2 September 2012, she made her Bundesliga debut for VfL in a 9–1 defeat against 1. FFC Turbine Potsdam. After 61 games for VfL Sindelfingen, she left the club and went to Morocco. After three months, Rall returned to Germany and switched to TSG 1899 Hoffenheim in February 2015, where the defender was initially used in the second team and then made the leap into the Bundesliga squad in 2017.

Rall was signed by FC Bayern Munich for the 2021–22 season. At Bayern, she switched from full-back to midfield and developed into a dangerous goal scorer. In her debut season, she finished as the club's second-best scorer with 10 goals. Rall was a regular this season, Bayern finished second in the Bundesliga behind champions VfL Wolfsburg.

The Chicago Red Stars acquired Rall in January 2024, signing her on a one-year contract with a mutual option for the 2025 season. She made her NWSL debut in the Red Stars' 2024 opening match, playing 90 minutes in a 2–0 victory over the Utah Royals. The following match, Rall scored her first goal with Chicago, netting the game-winner in a win against Seattle Reign FC. Rall would go on to miss a portion of the season due to an injury, which landed her on the 45-day injury list. At the end of the season, Rall's contract operation was not exercised by the Red Stars and she departed from the club.

On 28 January 2025, Rall signed a multi-year contract with VfB Stuttgart in the Frauen-Regionalliga.

== International career ==
Rall made her international debut for Germany on 10 November 2018, starting in a friendly match against Italy. The home match finished as a 5–2 win for Germany.

== Career statistics ==
As of 10 November 2022

Germany
Year	Apps	Goals
2018	2	0
2021	2	0
2022	5	0
Total	9	0

== Honours ==
Bayern Munich

- Frauen-Bundesliga: 2022–23
