= Waivers (sports) =

Type of sports player transaction

In North American sports contracts, waivers is a type of player transaction. A player under contract to a team is placed on "waivers" for a specified period of time; during this time other teams may submit a claim for that player's contract. Based on a priority system, the team with the highest priority earns either the right to negotiate with the player's current team, or in some cases, the right to assume the contract of that player from the current team. Each of the four major league sports has somewhat different procedures for handling waivers. The purpose of waivers is to prevent teams from colluding to exchange players outside of the normal trade rules, as well as to encourage parity by giving lower-ranked teams the right of first refusal to claim players who are no longer wanted by their former club.

== Major League Baseball ==
Players may be placed on waivers at any time. Teams may claim any waived player during the first three days after being placed on waivers. If more than one team claims the player during the three-day window, the team with the lowest win percentage has first priority. Once a player is claimed, the player's current team may either negotiate a trade, rescind the waiver, or do nothing and allow the claiming team to assume the player's contract. Any player that remains unclaimed (or whose waiver offer is not rescinded) after three days, the player may be sent outright ("outrighted") to a club's minor league baseball affiliate or, if the player has already been outrighted to the minors once before in his career, granted unrestricted free agency to sign with any club.

== National Football League ==
Players in the National Football League may be placed on waivers at any point between July 4 to February 1. Between July 4 and the end of the regular season, the waiver window is 24 hours. Between the end of the regular season and February 1 the waiver window is three days. If more than one team claims the player during the waiver window, the team with the lowest win percentage has first priority. Once another team claims a player on waivers, they assume that players contract without the need to negotiate with the player's former club. Any player that clears the waiver window becomes a free agent. Waivers are not possible between February 1 and July 4; players released outside of the season become free agents without having to clear waivers.

== National Hockey League ==
Players in the National Hockey League are placed on waivers following any of several conditions. Firstly, players who meet a certain threshold of league experience (based on a complex formula based on position, age, and time spent in the NHL) cannot be designated for assignment to a minor league club unless first placed on waivers. Secondly, players who spend at least one season playing in another country's major professional hockey league are placed on waivers when returning to the NHL. Thirdly, players who are released from their parent club unconditionally are placed on waivers before they become free agents. Teams have 24 hours (measured from noon Eastern Time following the announcement of the transaction) to place a claim on a player. If more than one team claims the player during the 24-hour window, the team with the lowest win-loss-tie point total has first priority. The claiming team then assumes the contract. If the player clears waivers, the intended transaction (either changing teams or outright release) proceeds.

== National Basketball Association ==
Players in the National Basketball Association are placed on waivers if they are released by their parent club during the season. Other teams have 48 hours to claim the waived player. If more than one team claims the player during the two-day window, the team with the lowest win percentage has first priority. The claiming team assumes the player's contract when they claim them, however for players signed off of waivers after March 1, they are ineligible to participate in that season's playoffs. Players who clear waivers become unrestricted free agents. Players released by their parent clubs in the off-season do not have to clear waivers before signing with another club.

== See also ==
- National Rugby Championship
- Super Rugby
