= Sami Feller =

American soccer player (born 2000)

Personal information
- Full name: Samantha Jaye Feller
- Date of birth: April 4, 2000 (age 26)
- Height: 5 ft 10 in (1.78 m)
- Positions: Midfielder; defender

Youth career
- Grand Junction Fire FC
- Real Colorado

College career
Years	Team	Apps	(Gls)
2018–2022	Denver Pioneers	94	(32)

Senior career*
Years	Team	Apps	(Gls)
2023–2024	Chicago Red Stars	1	(0)
2025	Riga FC	10	(12)
- * Club domestic league appearances and goals as of 01:41, July 2, 2026 (UTC)

Samantha Jaye Feller (born April 4, 2000) is an American former professional soccer player who played as a midfielder or a defender. She played college soccer for the Denver Pioneers before playing professionally for the Chicago Red Stars of the National Women's Soccer League (NWSL) and Riga FC of the Latvian Women's League.

== Early life ==
Feller grew up in Grand Junction, Colorado. She played varsity soccer at Palisade High School, where she was a team captain and a four-time All-Conference selection. Feller played for club team Grand Junction Fire FC, which she also captained. While playing for Fire FC, Feller also joined ECNL club Real Colorado in order to gain exposure with college coaches. She regularly drove several hours from Palisade to Denver to train with the team as a discovery player and made occasional guest appearances with the club.

== College career ==
As a high school sophomore, Feller verbally committed to play for Arizona State. She later changed her commitment to the Denver Pioneers in order to stay in Colorado. After missing the start of her freshman season with an injury, Feller took to the field in 2018 and scored her first two collegiate goals in her sixth career match. She started in all of Denver's matches in her next two years of college, operating as an attacking midfielder. Feller also captained the Pioneers in her final year of college. She was named to the Summit League First Team in five consecutive seasons and twice to the All-West Region First Team. Her college career was bookended by two individual awards, with Feller named the Summit League Freshman of the Year award in her rookie season and the Midfielder of the Year in 2022. In total, she made 94 college appearances and scored 32 goals across five years at Colorado.

== Club career ==
=== Chicago Red Stars ===
Feller declared for the 2023 NWSL Draft but was ultimately not selected. She later was invited to the Chicago Red Stars' preseason camp in January 2023 as a non-rostered invitee. After training with the Red Stars, Feller signed a three-year contract with an additional option on March 25, 2023. She made her professional debut in the club's season opener, entering the match as a substitute in a 3–2 loss to San Diego Wave FC. As the year progressed, Feller moved from midfield to the backline, converting into a center back. However, due to a hip injury, she was placed on the season-ending injury list and missed a portion of her rookie year. The Red Stars went on to finish 2023 in last place and 12th overall in the standings.

Over the offseason, Feller's former youth coach at Real Colorado, Lorne Donaldson, was hired as the Red Stars' new head coach. Feller recuperated over the first half of 2024 and was removed from the season-ending injury list on July 5. Her time with the Red Stars came to a close as she mutually terminated her contract with the club on September 16, 2024.

=== Riga FC ===
On February 6, 2025, Feller signed for Latvian Women's League title-holders Riga FC. In her lone season in Latvia, she found her footing offensively, scoring 12 goals across 10 league matches.
