= Sean Frazier =

American college athletics administrator

Current position
- Title: Athletic director
- Team: Northern Illinois
- Conference: Horizon League

Biographical details
- Education: Alabama ('92)

Coaching career (HC unless noted)
- 1995: Maine (assistant)

Administrative career (AD unless noted)
- 1996–1998: Maine (assistant AD)
- 1999–2002: Manhattanville
- 2002–2005: Clarkson
- 2005–2007: Merrimack
- 2007–2013: Wisconsin (deputy AD)
- 2013–present: Northern Illinois

Sean T. Frazier is an American college athletics administrator. He is the athletic director at Northern Illinois University, a position he has held since 2013. He previously served as deputy athletic director and chief of staff at the University of Wisconsin–Madison under athletic director Barry Alvarez and as athletic director at Merrimack College. Frazier is a former football student-athlete and alumnus of the University of Alabama.
