= Northern Illinois Huskies women's gymnastics =

University sports team

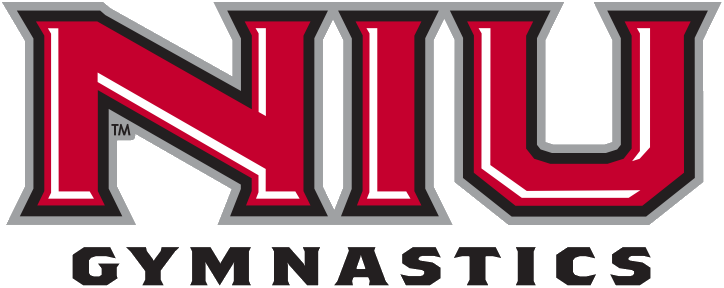
- Founded: 1978
- University: Northern Illinois University
- Head coach: Sam Morreale (7th season)
- Conference: Mountain West
- Location: DeKalb, Illinois
- Home arena: NIU Convocation Center (Capacity: 10,000)
- Nickname: Huskies
- Colors: Cardinal and black

NCAA Tournament appearances
- 1991, 1995

Conference championships
- 1992, 1993 (MIC); 2019 ( MAC)

The Northern Illinois Huskies women's gymnastics team represents Northern Illinois University (NIU) in DeKalb, Illinois. NIU gymnastics started competing in 1978 and competes in the Mountain West Conference as an affiliate member. NIU gymnastics has sent one individual participant to the NCAA Women's Gymnastics Championships (1998), two teams to the NCAA Regional Championships (1991, 1995), 37 individual participants to the NCAA Regionals, and three individual participants to the AIAW Regionals. The Huskies currently compete at the NIU Convocation Center and are coached by Sam Morreale.

== Championships ==
=== Conference Championships ===
- 1992 – Midwest Independent Conference (MIC) Championship
- 1993 – Midwest Independent Conference (MIC) Championship
- 2019 - Mid-American Conference (MAC) Championship

=== Individual Conference Champions ===
NIU gymnastics has had nine individual Conference Champions.

Year	Name	Event	Conference
1984	Darlene Davis	All-Around	MAC
1985	Jill Snyder	Bars	MAC
1998	Sandy Menard	Bars	MAC
1998	Alisha Conahan	Beam	MAC
2005	Ashlee Williams	Bars	MAC
2008	Holly Reichard	Bars	MAC
2009	Jennifer Naughton	Beam	MAC
2009	Holly Reichard	Beam	MAC
2017	Ashley Potts	Bars	MAC

== NCAA Regional Championships ==
NIU has sent two teams to the NCAA Women's Gymnastics Regional Championships.

Year	Team Members
1991	Cindy Hemstad, Sheryl Kurowski, Lori Lebo, Dayna Lia, Nickie Pedicini, Vicki Thimgan, Martha Unger, Laurie Vitallo
1995	Danielle Beauchesne, Tiffany Bollinger, Jill Carlos, Laura Clark, Mindee DeBoer, Amy Galanida, Sandy Menard, Fia Morano, Margaret Mroz, Shae Taylor

== Individual participants ==
=== NCAA National Championships ===
NIU has sent one gymnast to the NCAA Women's Gymnastics Championships.

Year	Name
1998	Sandy Menard

=== NCAA Regional Championships ===
NIU has sent 37 gymnasts to the NCAA Women's Gymnastics Regional Championships.

Year	Name
1984	Darlene Davis
1986	Darlene Davis
1987	Martha Unger
1988	Martha Unger
1989	Vicki Thimgan
1989	Martha Unger
1993	Margaret Mroz
1994	Margaret Mroz
1997	Alisha Conahan
1998	Sandy Menard
2000	Reyna Gilbert
2001	Anna Gardina
2002	Kristina Campos
2003	Kristina Campos
2004	Kristina Campos
2004	Danniella Dacey
2004	Kelly Kramer
2004	Katie Willett
2005	Kristina Campos

Year	Name
2005	Ashlee Williams
2007	Natalie Blum
2007	Leah Johnson
2008	Leah Johnson
2008	Holly Reichard
2009	Jennifer Naughton
2009	Holly Reichard
2010	Ashley Guerra
2011	Holly Reichard
2012	Kim Gotlund
2012	Tanya Rachan
2014	Kim Gotlund
2014	Amanda Stepp
2017	Jamyra Carter
2017	Courtney Dowdell
2017	Ashley Potts
2017	Katherine Prentice
2017	Andie Van Voorhis

=== AIAW Regional Championships ===
NIU has sent three gymnasts to the AIAW Gymnastics Midwest Regional Championships.

Year	Name
1981	Dawnita Doty
1982	Teresa Nevin
1982	Sara Silverman

== Honors ==
=== Academic All-Americans ===
NIU gymnastics has had two gymnasts named to CoSIDA Academic All-America teams, including one First-Team Academic All-American selection.

Year	Player	Team
2006	Ashlee Williams	Second-Team
2007	Jody Yednock	First-Team

NIU gymnastics has had 18 gymnasts named to National Association of Collegiate Gymnastics Coaches (NACGC) Scholar All-American teams.

Year	Player
2006	Meghan Cronin
2006	Brynne Dorsey
2006	Allison Holysz
2006	Kelly Kramer
2006	Jessica Marston
2006	Jennifer Naughton
2006	Bethany Plapp
2006	Jennifer Rice
2006	Ashlee Williams

Year	Player
2006	Jody Yednock
2007	Nicole Brugnoni
2007	Meghan Cronin
2007	Allison Holysz
2007	Kelly Kramer
2007	Jessica Marston
2007	Brittany Swantek
2007	Amber Whitecotton
2007	Jody Yednock

=== Gymnasts of the Year ===
NIU gymnastics has had two gymnasts named Gymnast of the Year by the conference.

Year	Player	Conference
2003	Kristina Campos	MAC
2009	Holly Reichard	MAC

=== Specialists of the Year ===
NIU gymnastics has had four gymnasts named Specialist of the Year by the conference.

Year	Player	Conference
2010	Ashley Guerra	MAC
2012	Megan Melendez	MAC
2014	Jaelyn Olsen	MAC
2017	Jamyra Carter	MAC

=== Coach of the Year ===
NIU gymnastics has had one head coach named Coach of the Year by the conference.

Year	Head Coach	Conference
2017	Sam Morreale	MAC

== Coaching staff ==
NIU gymnastics head coach Sam Morreale is NIU gymnastics' first ever MAC Coach of the Year, earning the award in 2017.

- Sam Morreale – Head Coach
- Dawnita Teague – Assistant Coach
- Chris Weiss – Assistant Coach
- Lisa Morreale – Assistant Coach

== See also ==
- Mid-American Conference Gymnastics Championships
