= Northern Illinois Huskies =

Intercollegiate sports teams of Northern Illinois University

- University: Northern Illinois University
- Nickname: Huskies
- NCAA: Division I (FBS)
- Conference: Horizon League (primary); Mountain West (football & women's gymnastics); Pac 12 (wrestling)
- Athletic director: Sean Frazier
- Location: DeKalb, Illinois
- Varsity teams: 17 (7 men’s, 10 women’s)
- Football stadium: Huskie Stadium
- Basketball arena: NIU Convocation Center
- Baseball stadium: Ralph McKinzie Field
- Softball stadium: Mary M. Bell Field
- Soccer stadium: NIU Soccer and Track & Field Complex
- Other venues: Huskie Tennis Courts; North 40 Cross Country Course; Rich Harvest Farms; Soldier Field; Victor E. Court
- Colors: Cardinal and black
- Mascot: Victor E. Huskie (Costume) (Note: NIU uses the spelling "Huskie" instead of "Husky", even in singular form.) Mission Huskie (Live mascot)
- Fight song: "Huskie Fight Song"
- Website: www.niuhuskies.com

The Northern Illinois Huskies are the athletic teams that represent Northern Illinois University (NIU). The Huskies are a member of the National Collegiate Athletic Association (NCAA) Division I and the Horizon League. The athletic program is made up of seven men's sports (baseball, basketball, football, golf, soccer, tennis, and wrestling) and 10 women's sports (basketball, cross country, golf, gymnastics, soccer, softball, tennis, track, and volleyball). The football team competes in the Football Bowl Subdivision (FBS).

NIU began athletic competition in 1899 and were nicknamed the Profs. In the 1920s, they were referred to as the Cardinals. During the 1930s they were called Evansmen after George Evans. The Huskie mascot and nickname used today were officially chosen in 1940.

On January 7, 2025, NIU announced that they would be joining the Mountain West Conference as a football-only member in 2026. On February 27, NIU announced that all non-football sports would join the Horizon League in July 2026.

== Sports sponsored ==
A member of the Horizon League (HL) for most Olympic sports except women's gymnastics (Mountain West Conference) and men's wrestling (Pac-12 Conference), NIU sponsors teams in seven men's and ten women's NCAA sanctioned sports.

Men's sports	Women's sports
Baseball	Basketball
Basketball	Cross country
Football	Golf
Golf	Gymnastics
Soccer	Soccer
Tennis	Softball
Wrestling	Tennis
	Track and field^{1}
	Volleyball
^{1} – Track and field includes both indoor and outdoor.

=== Baseball ===
NIU baseball started playing in 1900. The program was disbanded from 1983 through 1990. They currently play home games at the Ralph McKinzie Field in Dekalb, Illinois. They have appeared in the NCAA Tournament three times (1972, 1996, 2026).

Championships

- 1924 – Illinois Intercollegiate Athletic Conference Champions
- 1925 – Illinois Intercollegiate Athletic Conference Champions
- 1936 – Illinois Intercollegiate Athletic Conference Champions
- 1945 – Illinois Intercollegiate Athletic Conference Champions
- 1946 – Illinois Intercollegiate Athletic Conference Champions
- 1950 – Illinois Intercollegiate Athletic Conference Champions
- 1951 – Illinois Intercollegiate Athletic Conference Champions
- 1964 – Interstate Intercollegiate Athletic Conference Champions
- 1972 – Midwestern Conference Champions
- 1996 – Midwestern Collegiate Conference Champions (Tournament)
- 2013 – Mid-American Conference West Division Champions
- 2026 - Mid-American Conference Champions

=== Men's basketball ===
NIU men's basketball started playing in 1900. They currently play home games at the NIU Convocation Center in DeKalb, Illinois. They have appeared in the NCAA Tournament three times (1982, 1991, 1996).

Championships

- 1932 – Illinois Intercollegiate Athletic Conference Champions (Tournament)
- 1933 – Illinois Intercollegiate Athletic Conference Champions
- 1934 – Illinois Intercollegiate Athletic Conference Champions
- 1935 – Illinois Intercollegiate Athletic Conference Champions
- 1941 – Illinois Intercollegiate Athletic Conference Champions
- 1945 – Illinois Intercollegiate Athletic Conference Champions
- 1972 – Midwestern Conference Champions
- 1981 – Mid-American Conference Champions
- 1982 – Mid-American Conference Champions (Tournament)
- 1991 – Mid-Continent Conference Champions
- 1996 – Midwestern Collegiate Conference Champions (Tournament)
- 2006 – MAC West Division Champions

=== Football ===
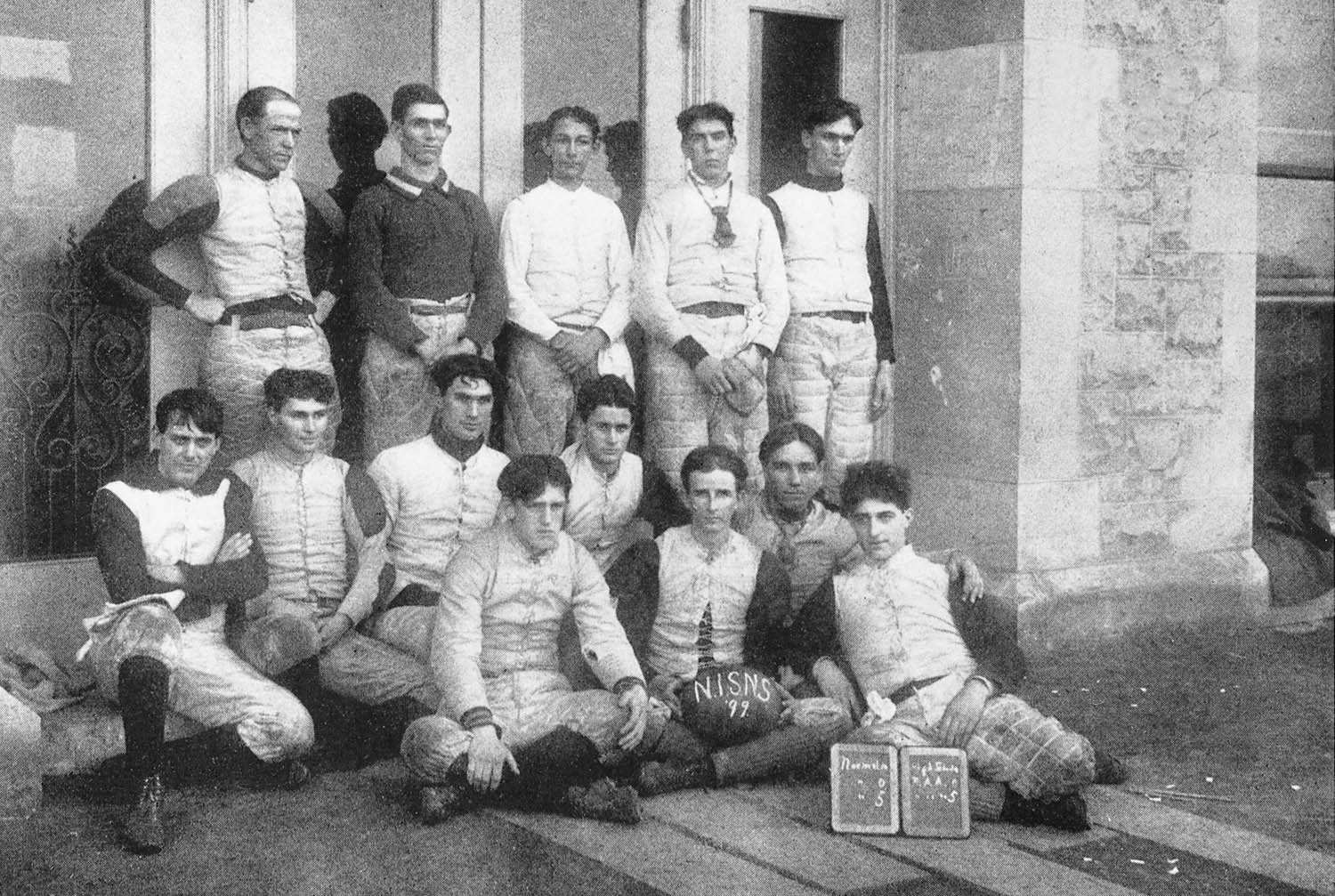
First football team of 1899

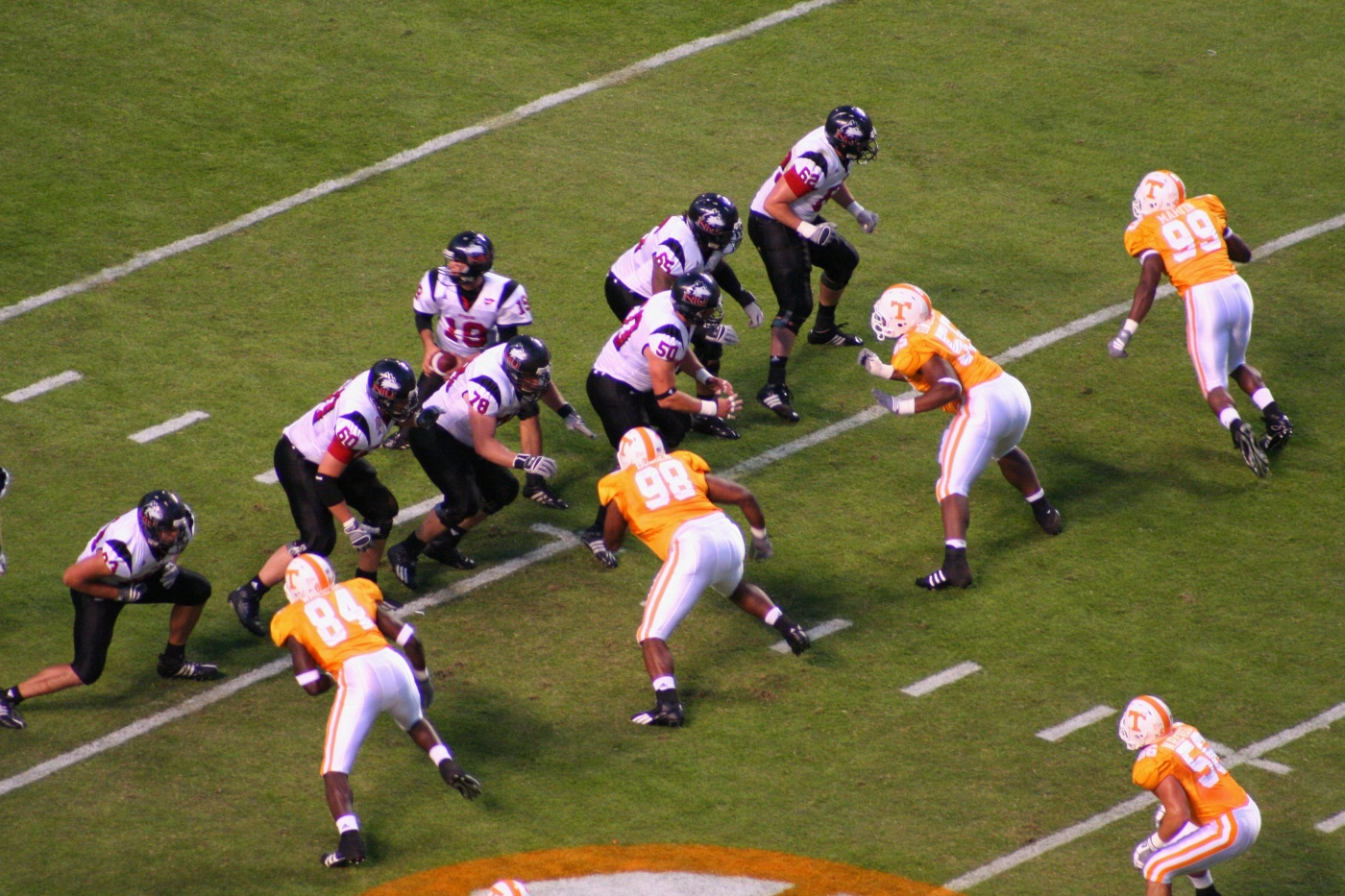
Northern Illinois v Tennessee game in 2008

NIU football started playing in 1899. They have won one National Championship, have won 12 football conference titles, and have appeared in 16 Division I-A and College Division Bowl Games.

Championships

- 1938 – Illinois Intercollegiate Athletic Conference Champions
- 1941 – Illinois Intercollegiate Athletic Conference Co-Champions
- 1944 – Illinois Intercollegiate Athletic Conference Champions
- 1946 – Illinois Intercollegiate Athletic Conference Champions
- 1951 – Interstate Intercollegiate Athletic Conference Champions
- 1963 – NCAA College Division National Champions
- 1963 – Interstate Intercollegiate Athletic Conference Champions
- 1964 – Interstate Intercollegiate Athletic Conference Co-Champions
- 1965 – Interstate Intercollegiate Athletic Conference Champions
- 1983 – Mid-American Conference Champions (MAC)
- 2001 – MAC West Division Co-Champions
- 2002 – MAC West Division Co-Champions
- 2004 – MAC West Division Co-Champions
- 2005 – MAC West Division Champions
- 2010 – MAC West Division Champions
- 2011 – MAC West Division Champions
- 2011 – Mid-American Conference Champions (MAC)
- 2012 – MAC West Division Champions
- 2012 – Mid-American Conference Champions (MAC)
- 2013 – MAC West Division Champions
- 2014 – MAC West Division Champions
- 2014 – Mid-American Conference Champions (MAC)
- 2015 – MAC West Division Champions
- 2018 – Mid-American Conference Champions (MAC)
- 2021 – Mid-American Conference Champions (MAC)

=== Men's golf ===
NIU men's golf team currently plays its home matches at Rich Harvest Farms in Sugar Grove, Illinois, where it hosted the 2017 NCAA Men's Golf Championship. The team has won the Mid-American Conference Golf title in 1976, 1985, and 2023. The Huskies also qualified for the 1976 NCAA Golf tournament.

Championships

- 1976 – Mid-American Conference Champions
- 1985 – Mid-American Conference Champions
- 1990 – Mid-Continent Conference Champions
- 1991 – Mid-Continent Conference Champions
- 1992 – Mid-Continent Conference Champions
- 1994 – Mid-Continent Conference Champions
- 2023 – Mid-American Conference Champions

=== Men's soccer ===
NIU men's soccer started playing in 1962. They currently play their home games at the NIU Soccer and Track & Field Complex. They have appeared in the NCAA Tournament four times (1973, 2006, 2011, 2021).

With the MAC discontinuing its men's soccer league after the 2022 season, NIU moved that sport to the Missouri Valley Conference for 2023. It moves to the Horizon League July 1st, 2026.

Championships

- 1984 – Midwest Metropolitan Conference Champions
- 1989 – Big Central Conference Champions (Tournament)
- 1990 – Mid-Continent Conference Champions
- 2006 – Mid-American Conference Champions
- 2006 – Mid-American Conference Champions (Tournament)
- 2011 – Mid-American Conference Champions (Tournament)
- 2021 – Mid-American Conference Champions (Tournament)

=== Men's tennis ===
NIU men's tennis team has had six players qualify for the NCAA tournament, one player twice and another player three times (1963, 1968, 1970–1973, 1987). They currently play their home matches at the NIU West Tennis Courts.

Championships

- 1991 – Mid-Continent Conference Champions
- 1992 – Mid-Continent Conference Champions
- 1993 – Mid-Continent Conference Champions
- 1994 – Mid-Continent Conference Champions
- 1996 – Midwestern Collegiate Conference Champions
- 1997 – Midwestern Collegiate Conference Champions

=== Wrestling ===
NIU Wrestling started in 1931, and first started competing in the Division I (NCAA) in 1969. The team had 9 NCAA All-Americans and 96 wrestlers qualify for the NCAA tournament, with two winning the NCAA title. Three other Huskie Wrestlers won the NAIA championship (1958 (@123), 1961 (@167), 1961 (@177))

Ryan Ludwig (three-time NAIA All-American and a national finalist at 157 pounds) is currently in his 3rd season as head coach for the Huskies. Completed in the fall of 2008, the NIU Wrestling Training Complex features everything a student-athlete needs to reach the highest levels on and off the mat.

Championships

- 1985 – Mid-American Conference Champions

=== Softball ===
NIU women's softball started playing in 1959. They currently play their home games at Mary M. Bell Field. They have made two NCAA Regional appearances (1988, 1996) and one appearance in the Women's College World Series (1988).

Championships

- 1988 – North Star Conference Champions
- 1989 – North Star Conference Champions
- 1990 – North Star Conference Champions
- 1996 – Midwestern Collegiate Conference Champions (Regular Season)
- 1996 – Midwestern Collegiate Conference Champions (Tournament)
- 1999 – Mid-American Conference Champions
- 2000 – Mid-American Conference Champions

=== Women's basketball ===
NIU women's basketball started playing in 1957. They currently play home games at the NIU Convocation Center in Dekalb, Illinois. They have appeared in the NCAA Tournament five times (1990, 1992, 1993, 1994, 1995). They have appeared in the National Invitation Tournament (NIT) two times (1991, 2017).

Championships

- 1972 – Midwest AIAW Region Champions
- 1982 – Illinois AIAW State Champions
- 1989 – North Star Conference Champions
- 1990 – North Star Conference Champions
- 1990 – North Star Conference Champions (Tournament)
- 1992 – North Star Conference Champions (Tournament)
- 1993 – Mid-Continent Conference Champions
- 1993 – Mid-Continent Conference Champions (Tournament)
- 1994 – Mid-Continent Conference Champions
- 1995 – Midwestern Collegiate Conference Champions

=== Women's soccer ===
NIU women's soccer started playing in 1993. They currently play their home games at the NIU Soccer and Track & Field Complex.

Championships

- 1997 – Mid-American Conference Champions
- 1997 – Mid-American Conference Champions (Tournament)
- 1998 – Mid-American Conference Champions
- 1998 – Mid-American Conference Champions (Tournament)

=== Women's volleyball ===
NIU women's volleyball started playing in 1970. They currently play home games at the NIU Convocation Center in Dekalb, Illinois. They have appeared in the NCAA Tournament seven times (1993, 1996, 1997, 1998, 2001, 2011, 2016). They appeared in the National Invitational Volleyball Championship (NIVC) three times (1991, 1992, 1994).

Championships

- 1988 – North Star Conference Champions (Regular Season)
- 1988 – North Star Conference Champions (Tournament)
- 1990 – North Star Conference Champions (Regular Season)
- 1991 – North Star Conference Champions (Tournament)
- 1992 – Mid-Continent Conference Champions (Regular Season)
- 1992 – Mid-Continent Conference Champions (Tournament)
- 1993 – Mid-Continent Conference Champions (Regular Season)
- 1993 – Mid-Continent Conference Champions (Tournament)
- 1995 – Midwestern Collegiate Conference Champions (Regular Season)
- 1996 – Midwestern Collegiate Conference Champions (Regular Season)
- 1996 – Midwestern Collegiate Conference Champions (Tournament)
- 1997 – MAC West Division Champions
- 1997 – Mid-American Conference co-champions (Regular Season)
- 1997 – Mid-American Conference Champions (Tournament)
- 1998 – MAC West Division Champions
- 1998 – Mid-American Conference co-champions (Regular Season)
- 2001 – MAC West Division Champions
- 2001 – Mid-American Conference Champions (Tournament)
- 2006 – MAC West Division Champions
- 2011 – MAC West Division Champions
- 2011 – Mid-American Conference Champions (Regular Season)
- 2014 – MAC West Division Champions
- 2015 – MAC West Division Champions
- 2015 – Mid-American Conference Champions (Regular Season)
- 2016 – MAC West Division Champions
- 2016 – Mid-American Conference co-champions (Regular Season)
- 2016 – Mid-American Conference Champions (Tournament)

=== Women's tennis ===
NIU women's tennis team started playing in 1974. They currently play their home matches at the NIU West Tennis Courts.

Championships

- 1989 – North Star Conference Champions
- 1990 – North Star Conference Champions
- 1991 – North Star Conference Champions
- 1993 – Mid-Continent Conference Champions
- 1994 – Mid-Continent Conference Champions

=== Women's gymnastics ===
NIU women's gymnastics started competing in 1978. They currently compete at the NIU Convocation Center in Dekalb, Illinois.

Championships

- 1992 – Midwest Independent Conference Champions
- 1993 – Midwest Independent Conference Champions
- 2019 – Mid American Conference Champions (Tournament)

=== Women's golf ===
NIU women's golf team currently plays its home matches at Rich Harvest Farms in Sugar Grove, Illinois, where it hosted the 2017 NCAA Women's Golf Championship.

=== Women's track and field ===
NIU women's outdoor track and field team currently competes at the NIU Soccer and Track & Field Complex. The women's indoor track and field team competes at NIU Convocation Center.

=== Women's cross country ===
NIU women's cross country team first competed for one year in 1981. The program was reinstated in 1995.

== National championships ==
=== Team ===
Sport	Association	Division	Year	Opponent/Runner-up	Score
Men's cross country (1)	NCAA	College	1958	South Dakota State	90–93 (-3)

== Club sports ==
=== Hockey ===
NIU Hockey was founded in 1965. The Huskies play college ice hockey in the Mid-American Collegiate Hockey Association (MACHA) conference of the American Collegiate Hockey Association (ACHA), ACHA Division 2 and ACHA Division 3. NIU was an ACHA D2 Regional Qualifier in 2013 and won three consecutive MACHA Bronze Division Championships, from the 2014–15 season through the 2016–17 season.

Championships

- 2015 – MACHA Bronze Division Champions
- 2016 – MACHA Bronze Division Champions
- 2017 – MACHA Bronze Division Champions

=== Rugby ===
NIU Rugby Football was founded in 1968 and plays college rugby in the Mid-American Conference of Division 1-AA. The Huskies are led by Head Coach Kris Osterloh. The Huskies reached the 2013 D1-AA national playoffs, but lost to Lindenwood in the round of 16.

== Cheerleading ==
NIU Cheerleading consists of two teams, All Girl and Large Coed. Both teams perform at football games, basketball games, and at the NCA College Nationals in Daytona Beach, Florida. In 2016, both teams made it to finals with the All-Girl team Finishing in 5th while the Large Coed team place 6th in the D1A Division.

2016

All Girl: 5th

Large Coed: 6th

2015

Large Coed: 5th

== NIU Athletics Hall of Fame ==
The NIU Athletics Hall of Fame first started in 1978. There has been an annual class induction since 1983. Women were inducted starting in 1986. There are currently 207 individuals and 17 teams enshrined in the NIU Athletics Hall of Fame.

== Mascot ==
The NIU Huskies are represented by both Victor E. Huskie (a person wearing a Siberian Husky costume) and Mission (a live Siberian Husky). The Mission program establishing a series of live dogs as mascots was started by the NIU Foundation in 2012. As of 2023, three dogs (Mission I, Mission II, and Mission III) have served in this role. Mission III was introduced in 2023.
