= List of Summit League champions =

Summit League

Titles of current member universities
Kansas City	35
North Dakota	2
North Dakota State	115
Omaha	18
Oral Roberts	161
St. Thomas	4
South Dakota	33
South Dakota State	85

Locations

This article is a list of Summit League conference champions. The Summit League sponsors 18 sports, 8 men's and 10 women's and no longer sponsors football. This article is updated through the completion of the 2026 Summit League women's soccer tournament, completed on November 15, 2026.

== Sports sponsored ==
=== Men's ===
School	Baseball	Basketball	Cross Country	Golf	Soccer	Swimming & Diving	Indoor Track & Field	Outdoor Track & Field	Total Summit League Sports
Kansas City	✗	✓	✓	✓	✓	✗	✓	✓	6
North Dakota	✗	✓	✓	✓	✗	✗	✓	✓	5
North Dakota State	✓	✓	✓	✓	✗	✗	✓	✓	6
Omaha	✓	✓	✗	✓	✓	✓	✗	✗	5
Oral Roberts	✓	✓	✓	✓	✓	✗	✓	✓	7
St. Thomas	✓	✓	✓	✓	✓	✓	✓	✓	9
South Dakota	✗	✓	✓	✓	✗	✓	✓	✓	6
South Dakota State	✓	✓	✓	✓	✗	✓	✓	✓	8
Associate members
Delaware					✓				1
Eastern Illinois						✓			1
Northern Colorado	✓								1
Southern Indiana						✓			1
UMass					✓				1
Totals	6	8	7	8	6	6	7	7	55

=== Women's ===
School	Basketball	Cross Country	Golf	Soccer	Softball	Swimming & Diving	Tennis	Indoor Track & Field	Outdoor Track & Field	Volleyball	Total Summit League Sports
Kansas City	✓	✓	✓	✓	✓	✗	✗	✓	✓	✓	8
North Dakota	✓	✓	✓	✓	✓	✗	✗	✓	✓	✓	8
North Dakota State	✓	✓	✓	✓	✓	✗	✗	✓	✓	✓	8
Omaha	✓	✓	✓	✓	✓	✓	✓	✓	✓	✓	10
Oral Roberts	✓	✓	✓	✓	✗	✗	✓	✓	✓	✓	8
St. Thomas	✓	✓	✓	✓	✓	✓	✓	✓	✓	✓	10
South Dakota	✓	✓	✓	✓	✓	✓	✓	✓	✓	✓	10
South Dakota State	✓	✓	✓	✓	✓	✓	✗	✓	✓	✓	9
Associate members
Eastern Illinois						✓					1
Southern Indiana						✓					1
Totals	8	8	8	8	7	6	4	8	8	8	73

== Membership ==
=== Current members ===
- Kansas City Roos (1994–2013, 2020–present)
  - Represents the University of Missouri–Kansas City, whose athletic program was known as the UMKC Kangaroos from the school's joining the University of Missouri System in 1963 through the 2018–19 school year.
- North Dakota Fighting Hawks (2018–present)
- North Dakota State Bison (2007–present)
- Omaha Mavericks (2012–present)
- Oral Roberts Golden Eagles (1997–2012, 2014–present)
- St. Thomas Tommies (2021–present)
- South Dakota Coyotes (2011–present)
- South Dakota State Jackrabbits (2007–present)

=== Current affiliate members ===
Years listed here are the calendar years of arrival. For schools which are members only in spring sports (such as baseball), the year of arrival precedes the first season of competition.

- Delaware Fightin' Blue Hens (men's soccer, 2025–present)
- Eastern Illinois Panthers (men's and women's swimming and diving, 2006–present)
- Northern Colorado Bears (baseball, 2021–present)
- Southern Indiana Screaming Eagles (men's and women's swimming & diving, 2022–present)
- UMass Minutemen and Minutewomen (men's soccer, 2025–present)

=== Former members ===
- Akron Zips (1990–1992)
- Buffalo Bulls (1994–1998)
- Centenary Gentlemen and Ladies (2003–2011)
- Central Connecticut State Blue Devils (1994–1997)
- Chicago State Cougars (1994–2006)
- Cleveland State Vikings (1982–1994)
- Denver Pioneers (2013–2026)
- Eastern Illinois Panthers (1982–1996)
- IUPUI Jaguars (1998–2017)
- Northeastern Illinois Golden Eagles (1994–1998)
- Northern Illinois Huskies (1990–1994)
- Northern Iowa Panthers (1982–1991)
- Oakland Golden Grizzlies (1998–2013)
- Purdue Fort Wayne Mastodons (2007–2020)
  - The Purdue Fort Wayne athletic program originally represented Indiana University – Purdue University Fort Wayne (IPFW), and was branded as "IPFW" through the 2015–16 school year, after which it adopted the "Fort Wayne" branding. After the 2017–18 school year, IPFW was dissolved and replaced by two new institutions—Indiana University Fort Wayne, with no athletic program, and Purdue University Fort Wayne, which inherited the IPFW athletic program. Purdue Fort Wayne left the Summit League in July 2020 to join the Horizon League.
- Southern Utah Thunderbirds (1997–2012)
- Southwest Missouri State Bears (1982–1990)
- Troy State Trojans (1994–1997)
- UIC Flames (1982–1994)
- Valparaiso Crusaders (1982–2007)
  - While Valparaiso's nickname is now Beacons, the nickname was Crusaders during the school's tenure in the Summit League, both as a full member and as an associate.
- Wisconsin–Green Bay Phoenix (1982–1994)
- Wisconsin–Milwaukee Panthers (1993–1994)
- Wright State Raiders (1991–1994)
- Youngstown State Penguins (1992–2001)
- Western Illinois Leathernecks (1982–2023)

=== Former affiliate members ===
- C. W. Post Pioneers (Baseball associate 1995–1998)
- DePaul Blue Demons (Softball associate 1993–1999)
- Drake Bulldogs (Men's tennis associate, 2017–2026)
- Eastern Illinois Panthers (Men's soccer associate 2011–2022)
- Howard Bison (Men's soccer associate 1996–1998)
- Illinois State Redbirds (Men's tennis associate, 2017–2026)
- Lindenwood Lions (Men's soccer associate 2022, swimming and division associate 2022–24)
- Northern Colorado Bears (Men's golf associate 2024–25)
- NYIT Bears (Baseball associate 1995–1998)
- Oneonta State Red Dragons (Men's soccer associate 1996–1997)
- Oral Roberts Golden Eagles (Men's soccer associate, 2012–2013; returned to full membership in 2014)
- Pace Setters (Baseball associate 1995–1998)
- Quincy Hawks (Men's soccer associate 1994–1995)
- Southern Indiana Screaming Eagles (Men's soccer associate 2022)
- SIU Edwardsville Cougars (Men's soccer associate 1994–1995)
- South Dakota Coyotes (Men's and women's swimming and diving associate 2010–2011)
- South Dakota State Jackrabbits (Men's and women's swimming and diving associate 2006–2008)
- Valparaiso Crusaders (men's swimming, 2017–2021; men's tennis; 2017–2020)
- Weber State Wildcats (Men's golf associate 2024–25)

== Baseball ==
Division titles are counted as a full regular season championship. Current Summit League members Kansas City, North Dakota, and South Dakota have never sponsored baseball while in the conference.

Of former Summit members, IUPUI added baseball in the 1994 season but dropped the sport after 2001; Wisconsin–Milwaukee only participated in league play in the 1994 season, its final one in the conference; Oakland did not participate in league play during the 1999 season, its first as a conference member; and Buffalo, Denver, and Wisconsin–Green Bay never sponsored baseball while in the Summit.

Baseball titles by school
Team	Seasons in league (Note: Reflects baseball seasons; the first season of competition takes place in the calendar year after a school joins the conference.)	Regular Season	Tournament	Total
Oral Roberts	1998–2012; 2015–present	21	22	43
Southwest Missouri State	1984–1990	4	6	10
Eastern Illinois	1984–1996	6	0	6
North Dakota State	2008–present	1	3	4
Omaha	2013–present	3	1	4
Troy State	1995–1997	2	2	4
Wright State	1992–1994	3	1	4
South Dakota State	2008–present	1	2	3
UIC	1984–1994	1	2	3
Valparaiso	1984–2007	3	0	3
Akron	1990–1992	1	1	2
Cleveland State	1984–1994	2	0	2
Northeastern Illinois	1995–1998	1	1	2
St. Thomas	2022–present	2	0	2
C. W. Post	1995–1998	1	0	1
Centenary	2004–2011	0	0	0
Central Connecticut State	1995–1998	0	0	0
Chicago State	1995–2006	0	0	0
IUPUI	1994–2001	0	0	0
Pace	1995–1998	0	0	0
New York Tech	1995–1998	0	0	0
Northern Colorado	2022–present	0	0	0
Northern Illinois	1992–1994	0	0	0
Northern Iowa	1984–1991	0	0	0
Oakland	2000–2013	0	0	0
Purdue Fort Wayne (IPFW, Fort Wayne)	2008–2020	0	0	0
Southern Utah	2000–2012	0	0	0
Western Illinois	1984–2023	0	0	0
Wisconsin–Milwaukee	1994	0	X	0
Youngstown State	1992–2001	0	0	0

Year	Regular season		Record	Tournament	Ref
1984	Not held			Southwest Missouri State	
1985	Blue	Valparaiso	5–3	Southwest Missouri State	
1985	Gray	Eastern Illinois	8–0	Southwest Missouri State	
1986	Blue	Cleveland State	7–4	Southwest Missouri State	
1986	Gray	Southwest Missouri State	11–1	Southwest Missouri State	
1987	Blue	Valparaiso	8–4	Southwest Missouri State	
1987	Gray	Eastern Illinois	9–3	Southwest Missouri State	
1988	Blue	Valparaiso	6–5	Southwest Missouri State	
1988	Gray	Southwest Missouri State	12–0	Southwest Missouri State	
1989	Blue	Cleveland State	7–3	Southwest Missouri State	
1989	Gray	Southwest Missouri State	8–2	Southwest Missouri State	
1990	Blue	UIC	8–3	UIC	
1990	Gray	Southwest Missouri State	11–0	UIC	
1991	Blue	Akron	12–5	Akron	
1991	Gray	Eastern Illinois	9–2	Akron	
1992	Blue	Wright State	17–3	Wright State	
1992	Gray	Eastern Illinois	13–7	Wright State	
1993	Wright State		17–3	UIC	
1994	Wright State		16–8	Not held	
1995	East	Youngstown State	16–4	Troy State	
1995	West	Eastern Illinois	15–5	Troy State	
1996	East	Troy State	16–2	Northeastern Illinois	
1996	West	Eastern Illinois	15–3	Northeastern Illinois	
1997	East	Troy State	8–6	Troy State	
1997	West	Northeastern Illinois	16–7	Troy State	
1998	East	C. W. Post	12–2	Oral Roberts	
1998	West	Oral Roberts	18–6	Oral Roberts	
1999	Oral Roberts		14–4	Oral Roberts	
2000	Oral Roberts		26–1	Oral Roberts	
2001	Oral Roberts		24–1	Oral Roberts	

Year	Regular season	Record	Tournament	Ref
2002	Oral Roberts	16–2	Oral Roberts	
2003	Oral Roberts	19–1	Oral Roberts	
2004	Oral Roberts	21–1	Oral Roberts	
2005	Oral Roberts	22–2	Oral Roberts	
2006	Oral Roberts	17–2	Oral Roberts	
2007	Oral Roberts	19–1	Oral Roberts	
2008	Oral Roberts	24–4	Oral Roberts	
2009	Oral Roberts	16–2	Oral Roberts	
2010	Oral Roberts; South Dakota State	19–9	Oral Roberts	
2011	Oral Roberts	21–7	Oral Roberts	
2012	Oral Roberts	17–6	Oral Roberts	
2013	Omaha	20–6	South Dakota State	
2014	Omaha	15–11	North Dakota State	
2015	Oral Roberts	25–5	Oral Roberts	
2016	Oral Roberts	22–8	Oral Roberts	
2017	Oral Roberts	25–4	Oral Roberts	
2018	Oral Roberts	24–6	Oral Roberts	
2019	Omaha	20–10	Omaha	
2020	Season canceled due to COVID-19			
2021	Oral Roberts	19–7	North Dakota State	
2022	North Dakota State	17–5	Oral Roberts	
2023	Oral Roberts	23–1	Oral Roberts	
2024	St. Thomas (Note: St. Thomas was ineligible for postseason contention due to their transition from Division III)	16–10	Oral Roberts	
2025	Oral Roberts; St. Thomas	21–9	North Dakota State	
2026	Oral Roberts	22–6	South Dakota State	
2027				

== Basketball (men's) ==
All current Summit members have sponsored men's basketball throughout their tenures in the conference.

Among former members, Cleveland State was suspended from conference play in men's basketball during the 1988–89 and 1989–90 seasons, and Oakland didn't compete in conference play during the 1998–99 season, its first as a Summit member.

Seasons are listed by the calendar years in which they ended.

Men's basketball titles by school
Team	Season	Regular Season	Tournament	Total
Valparaiso	1983–2007	9	8	17
South Dakota State	2008–present	9	7	16
Oral Roberts	1998–2012; 2015–present	7	5	12
North Dakota State	2008–present	5	6	11
Oakland	2000–2013	3	3	6
Southwest Missouri State	1983–1990	4	2	6
Cleveland State	1983–1988; 1991–1994	3	1	4
Western Illinois	1983–2023	2	1	3
Wisconsin–Green Bay	1983–1994	2	1	3
Eastern Illinois	1983–1996	0	2	2
Purdue Fort Wayne (IPFW, Fort Wayne)	2008–2020	2	0	2
IUPUI	1999–2017	1	1	2
Omaha	2013–present	1	1	2
Southern Utah	1998–2012	1	1	2
Northern Illinois	1991–1994	1	0	1
Northern Iowa	1983–1991	0	1	1
South Dakota	2012–present	1	0	1
UIC	1983–1994	1	0	1
Wright State	1992–1994	0	1	1
Akron	1991–1992	0	0	0
Buffalo	1995–1998	0	0	0
Centenary	2004–2011	0	0	0
Central Connecticut State	1995–1997	0	0	0
Chicago State	1995–2006	0	0	0
Denver	2014–2026	0	0	0
Kansas City (UMKC)	1995–2013; 2021–present	0	0	0
North Dakota	2019–present	0	0	0
Northeastern Illinois	1995–1998	0	0	0
St. Thomas (Note: St. Thomas was ineligible for the Summit League tournament in 2021, and for the NCAA tournament from 2021–2025 due to their transition from Division III)	2022–present	0	0	0
Troy State	1995–1997	0	0	0
Wisconsin–Milwaukee	1994	0	0	0
Youngstown State	1993–2001	0	0	0

Year	Regular season	Record	Tournament	Ref
1982–83	Western Illinois	9–3	Not held	
1983–84	UIC	12–2	Western Illinois	
1984–85	Cleveland State	11–3	Eastern Illinois	
1985–86	Cleveland State	13–1	Cleveland State	
1986–87	Southwest Missouri State	13–1	Southwest Missouri State	
1987–88	Southwest Missouri State	12–2	Not held	
1988–89	Southwest Missouri State	10–2	Southwest Missouri State	
1989–90	Southwest Missouri State	11–1	Northern Iowa	
1990–91	Northern Illinois	14–2	Wisconsin–Green Bay	
1991–92	Wisconsin–Green Bay	14–2	Eastern Illinois	
1992–93	Cleveland State	15–1	Wright State	
1993–94	Wisconsin–Green Bay	15–3	Wisconsin–Green Bay	
1994–95	Valparaiso	14–4	Valparaiso	
1995–96	Valparaiso	13–5	Valparaiso	
1996–97	Valparaiso	13–3	Valparaiso	
1997–98	Valparaiso	13–3	Valparaiso	
1998–99	Oral Roberts; Valparaiso	10–4	Valparaiso	
1999–00	Oakland	11–5	Valparaiso	
2000–01	Southern Utah; Valparaiso	13–3	Southern Utah	
2001–02	Valparaiso	12–2	Valparaiso	
2002–03	Valparaiso	12–2	IUPUI	
2003–04	Valparaiso	11–5	Valparaiso	
2004–05	Oral Roberts	13–3	Oakland	
2005–06	IUPUI; Oral Roberts	13–3	Oral Roberts	

Year	Regular season	Record	Tournament	Ref
2006–07	Oral Roberts	12–2	Oral Roberts	
2007–08	Oral Roberts	16–2	Oral Roberts	
2008–09	North Dakota State	16–2	North Dakota State	
2009–10	Oakland	17–1	Oakland	
2010–11	Oakland	17–1	Oakland	
2011–12	Oral Roberts	17–1	South Dakota State	
2012–13	South Dakota State; Western Illinois	13–3	South Dakota State	
2013–14	North Dakota State	12–2	North Dakota State	
2014–15	IPFW; South Dakota State	12–4	North Dakota State	
2015–16	IPFW; South Dakota State	12–4	South Dakota State	
2016–17	South Dakota	12–4	South Dakota State	
2017–18	South Dakota State	13–1	South Dakota State	
2018–19	South Dakota State	14–2	North Dakota State	
2019–20	North Dakota State; South Dakota State	13–3	North Dakota State	
2020–21	South Dakota State	9–3	Oral Roberts	
2021–22	South Dakota State	18–0	South Dakota State	
2022–23	Oral Roberts	18–0	Oral Roberts	
2023–24	South Dakota State	12–4	South Dakota State	
2024–25	Omaha	13–3	Omaha	
2025–26	North Dakota State	14–2	North Dakota State	
2026–27				

== Basketball (women's) ==
All current Summit members have sponsored women's basketball throughout their tenures in the conference.

Among former members, Oakland didn't compete in conference play during the 1998–99 season, its first as a Summit member.

Seasons are listed by the calendar years in which they ended.

Women's basketball titles by school
Team	Season	Regular Season	Tournament	Total
South Dakota State	2008–present	11	13	24
Western Illinois	1993–2023	6	2	8
Youngstown State	1993–2001	5	3	8
Oral Roberts	1998–2012; 2015–present	2	5	7
Oakland	2000–2013	3	2	5
South Dakota	2012–present	5	4	9
Valparaiso	1993–2007	2	2	4
Northern Illinois	1993–1994	2	1	3
Troy State	1995–1997	1	1	2
North Dakota State	2008–present	1	0	1
Buffalo	1995–1998	0	0	0
Wisconsin–Green Bay	1993–1994	0	0	0
Centenary	2004–2011	0	0	0
Central Connecticut State	1995–1997	0	0	0
Chicago State	1995–2006	0	0	0
Cleveland State	1993–1994	0	0	0
Denver	2014–2026	0	0	0
Eastern Illinois	1993–1996	0	0	0
IUPUI	1999–2017	0	0	0
Kansas City (UMKC)	1995–2013; 2021–present	0	0	0
North Dakota	2019–present	0	0	0
Northeastern Illinois	1995–1998	0	0	0
Omaha	2013–present	0	0	0
Purdue Fort Wayne (IPFW, Fort Wayne)	2008–2020	0	0	0
St. Thomas (Note: St. Thomas was ineligible for the Summit League tournament in 2021, and for the NCAA tournament from 2021–2025 due to their transition from Division III)	2022–present	0	0	0
Southern Utah	1998–2012	0	0	0
UIC	1993–1994	0	0	0
Wisconsin–Milwaukee	1994	0	0	0
Wright State	1993–1994	0	0	0

Year	Regular season	Record	Tournament	Ref
1992–93	Northern Illinois	15–1	Northern Illinois	
1993–94	Northern Illinois	18–0	Wisconsin–Green Bay	
1994–95	Buffalo; Western Illinois; Youngstown State	14–4	Western Illinois	
1995–96	Youngstown State	14–4	Youngstown State	
1996–97	Troy State; Youngstown State	13–3	Troy State	
1997–98	Youngstown State	15–1	Youngstown State	
1998–99	Valparaiso; Youngstown State	10–4	Oral Roberts	
1999–00	Oakland	13–3	Youngstown State	
2000–01	Oakland	12–4	Oral Roberts	
2001–02	Valparaiso	13–1	Oakland	
2002–03	Western Illinois	12–2	Valparaiso	
2003–04	Western Illinois	13–3	Valparaiso	
2004–05	Western Illinois	13–3	Oral Roberts	
2005–06	Western Illinois	13–3	Oakland	
2006–07	Oakland	12–2	Oral Roberts	
2007–08	South Dakota State	16–2	Oral Roberts	

Year	Regular season	Record	Tournament	Ref
2008–09	South Dakota State	17–1	South Dakota State	
2009–10	Oral Roberts	15–3	South Dakota State	
2010–11	Oral Roberts	16–2	South Dakota State	
2011–12	South Dakota State	16–2	South Dakota State	
2012–13	South Dakota State	14–2	South Dakota State	
2013–14	South Dakota State	13–1	South Dakota	
2014–15	South Dakota	13–3	South Dakota State	
2015–16	South Dakota	15–1	South Dakota State	
2016–17	Western Illinois	13–3	Western Illinois	
2017–18	South Dakota	14–0	South Dakota State	
2018–19	South Dakota State	13–1	South Dakota State	
2019–20	South Dakota	16–0	South Dakota	
2020–21	South Dakota State	14–0	South Dakota	
2021–22	South Dakota; South Dakota State	17–1	South Dakota	
2022–23	South Dakota State	18–0	South Dakota State	
2023–24	South Dakota State	16–0	South Dakota State	
2024–25	South Dakota State	16–0	South Dakota State	
2025–26	North Dakota State	15–1	South Dakota State	
2026–27				

== Cross country (men's) ==
All current Summit members sponsor men's cross country except Omaha.

Several former conference members did not continuously sponsor the sport while in the league. Denver and Northern Illinois never sponsored men's cross country while they were Summit members. Cleveland State sponsored the sport when it joined, but dropped men's cross country after 1992. Wisconsin–Green Bay did not have a score in the 1982 cross country meet. Valparaiso did not participate in the 1984 cross country meet. UIC did not have a score in the 1986 cross country meet and Eastern Illinois did not participate.

Men's cross country titles by school
Team	Season	Total
South Dakota State	2007–present	15
Southern Utah	1997–2011	11
Northern Iowa	1982–1990	5
Southwest Missouri State	1982–1989	4
Youngstown State	1991–2000	3
IUPUI	1998–2016	2
Oakland	1999–2012	2
Cleveland State	1983–1992	1
Western Illinois	1982–2022	1
Wisconsin–Milwaukee	1992–1993	1
Akron	1989–1991	0
Buffalo	1994–1997	0
Centenary	2003–2010	0
Central Connecticut State	1994–1996	0
Chicago State	1994–2005	0
Eastern Illinois	1982–1985; 1987–1995	0
Kansas City (UMKC)	1994–2012; 2020–present	0
North Dakota	2018–present	0
North Dakota State	2007–present	0
Northeastern Illinois	1994–1997	0
Omaha	2012–present	0
Oral Roberts	1997–2011; 2014–present	0
Purdue Fort Wayne (IPFW, Fort Wayne)	2007–2019	0
St. Thomas	2021–present	0
South Dakota	2011–present	0
Troy State	1994–1996	0
UIC	1982–1993	0
Valparaiso	1982–1983; 1985–2006	0
Wisconsin–Green Bay	1982–1993	0
Wright State	1991–1993	0

Year	Champion	Ref
1982	Northern Iowa	
1983	Northern Iowa	
1984	Northern Iowa	
1985	Southwest Missouri State	
1986	Southwest Missouri State	
1987	Southwest Missouri State	
1988	Northern Iowa	
1989	Southwest Missouri State	
1990	Northern Iowa	
1991	Western Illinois	
1992	Cleveland State	
1993	Wisconsin–Milwaukee	
1994	Youngstown State	
1995	Youngstown State	
1996	Youngstown State	
1997	Southern Utah	
1998	Southern Utah	
1999	Southern Utah	
2000	Southern Utah	
2001	Southern Utah	
2002	Oakland	
2003	Southern Utah	
2004	Southern Utah	
2005	Oakland	

Year	Champion	Ref
2006	Southern Utah	
2007	Southern Utah	
2008	Southern Utah	
2009	South Dakota State	
2010	South Dakota State	
2011	Southern Utah	
2012	South Dakota State	
2013	South Dakota State	
2014	IUPUI	
2015	IUPUI	
2016	South Dakota State	
2017	South Dakota State	
2018	South Dakota State	
2019	South Dakota State	
2020	South Dakota State	
2021	South Dakota State	
2022	South Dakota State	
2023	South Dakota State	
2024	South Dakota State	
2025	South Dakota State	
2026	South Dakota State	

== Cross country (women's) ==
All current Summit members sponsor women's cross country.

Among former conference members, the only schools that never sponsored cross country while in the Summit were Denver and Northern Illinois.

Women's cross country titles by school
Team	Season	Total
Southern Utah	1997–2011	9
South Dakota	2011–present	6
North Dakota State	2007–present	5
South Dakota State	2007–present	4
Buffalo	1994–1997	3
North Dakota	2018–present	2
Oral Roberts	1997–2011; 2014–present	2
Wisconsin–Milwaukee	1992–1993	2
Oakland	1999–2012	1
Purdue Fort Wayne (IPFW, Fort Wayne)	2007–2019	1
Youngstown State	1992–2000	1
Centenary	2004–2010	0
Central Connecticut State	1994–1995	0
Chicago State	1994–2005	0
Cleveland State	1992–1993	0
Eastern Illinois	1992–1995	0
IUPUI	1998–2016	0
Kansas City (UMKC)	1994–2012; 2020–present	0
Northeastern Illinois	1994–1997	0
Omaha	2012–present	0
St. Thomas	2021–present	0
Troy State	1994–1996	0
UIC	1992–1993	0
Valparaiso	1992–2006	0
Western Illinois	1992–2022	0
Wisconsin–Green Bay	1992–1993	0
Wright State	1992–1993	0

Year	Champion	Ref
1992	Wisconsin–Milwaukee	
1993	Wisconsin–Milwaukee	
1994	Buffalo	
1995	Buffalo	
1996	Buffalo	
1997	Youngstown State	
1998	Southern Utah	
1999	Southern Utah	
2000	Southern Utah	
2001	Southern Utah	
2002	Southern Utah	
2003	Southern Utah	
2004	Southern Utah	
2005	Oral Roberts	
2006	Oral Roberts	
2007	IPFW; Southern Utah	
2008	South Dakota State	
2009	Southern Utah	

Year	Champion	Ref
2010	Oakland	
2011	North Dakota State	
2012	North Dakota State	
2013	North Dakota State	
2014	South Dakota	
2015	South Dakota	
2016	South Dakota	
2017	South Dakota	
2018	South Dakota	
2019	North Dakota State	
2020	South Dakota State	
2021	South Dakota State	
2022	North Dakota State	
2023	South Dakota	
2024	South Dakota State	
2025	North Dakota	
2026	North Dakota	

== Football ==
Football was sponsored by the conference from 1982 to 1984. Members of the conference went on to form the league now known as the Missouri Valley Football Conference.

Football titles by school
Team	Season	Titles
Eastern Illinois	1982–1984	3
Northern Iowa	1982–1984	2
Southwest Missouri State	1982–1984	0
Western Illinois	1982–1984	0

Year	Champion	Record	Ref
1982	Eastern Illinois; Northern Iowa	2–0–1	
1983	Eastern Illinois	3–0–0	
1984	Eastern Illinois; Northern Iowa	2–1–0	

== Golf (men's) ==
All current Summit League members sponsor men's golf.

Among former members, Buffalo, UIC, and Wisconsin–Milwaukee did not sponsor men's golf in the Summit League. Valparaiso dropped men's golf after 1999.

Since NCAA golf is a spring sport, the first season of competition for each school is the calendar year after said school either joined the conference or added men's golf, as applicable.

Men's golf titles by school
Team	Season	Total
Oral Roberts	1998–2012; 2015–present	8
Western Illinois	1983–2023	8
Denver	2014–2026	4
Kansas City (UMKC)	1995–2013; 2021–present	4
Northern Illinois	1990–1994	4
IUPUI	1999–2017	3
Troy State	1995–1997	3
North Dakota State	2008–present	2
South Dakota State	2008–present	2
Southwest Missouri State	1983–1990	2
Northern Iowa	1983–1991	1
South Dakota	2012–present	1
Wright State	1992–1994	1
Akron	1990–1992	0
Centenary	2004–2011	0
Central Connecticut State	1995–1997	0
Chicago State	1998–2000; 2005–2006	0
Cleveland State	1984–1994	0
Eastern Illinois	1983–1996	0
North Dakota	2019–present	0
Northeastern Illinois	1995–1998	0
Northern Colorado	2024–2025	0
Northern Illinois	1990–1994	0
Oakland	2000–2013	0
Omaha	2013–present	0
Purdue Fort Wayne (IPFW, Fort Wayne)	2008–2020	0
St. Thomas	2022–present	0
Southern Utah	1998–2012	0
Troy State	1995–1997	0
Valparaiso	1983–1992	0
Weber State	2024–2025	0
Wisconsin–Green Bay	1983–1994	0
Youngstown State	1992–2001	0

Year	Champion	Ref
1983	Western Illinois	
1984	Western Illinois	
1985	Western Illinois	
1986	Northern Iowa	
1987	Western Illinois	
1988	Southwest Missouri State	
1989	Southwest Missouri State	
1990	Northern Illinois	
1991	Northern Illinois	
1992	Northern Illinois	
1993	Wright State	
1994	Northern Illinois	
1995	Troy State	
1996	Troy State	
1997	Troy State	
1998	Oral Roberts	
1999	Oral Roberts	
2000	Oral Roberts	
2001	Oral Roberts	
2002	IUPUI	
2003	Oral Roberts	
2004	Western Illinois	
2005	IUPUI	

Year	Champion	Ref
2006	Western Illinois	
2007	Western Illinois	
2008	Western Illinois	
2009	Oral Roberts	
2010	Oral Roberts	
2011	UMKC	
2012	IUPUI	
2013	UMKC	
2014	Denver	
2015	South Dakota	
2016	South Dakota State	
2017	South Dakota State	
2018	North Dakota State	
2019	Denver	
2020	Not held due to COVID-19	
2021	Denver	
2022	Denver	
2023	Kansas City	
2024	Kansas City	
2025	Denver	
2026	North Dakota State	
2027		

== Golf (women's) ==
All current Summit League members sponsor women's golf.

Among former members, Valparaiso never sponsored women's golf while a member, and Chicago State dropped women's golf after 2000.

Women's golf titles by school
Team	Season	Total
Oral Roberts	1998–2012; 2015–present	15
Denver	2014–2026	10
North Dakota State	2008–present	2
South Dakota State	2008–present	1
Centenary	2006–2011	0
Chicago State	1998–2000	0
IUPUI	2001–2017	0
Kansas City (UMKC)	1998–2013; 2021–present	0
North Dakota	2019–present	0
Oakland	2000–2013	0
Omaha	2013–present	0
Purdue Fort Wayne (IPFW, Fort Wayne)	2008–2020	0
St. Thomas	2022–present	0
South Dakota	2012–present	0
Southern Utah	2008–2012	0
Western Illinois	2002–2023	0
Youngstown State	1998–2001	0

Year	Champion	Ref
1998	Oral Roberts	
1999	Oral Roberts	
2000	Oral Roberts	
2001	Oral Roberts	
2002	Oral Roberts	
2003	Oral Roberts	
2004	Oral Roberts	
2005	Oral Roberts	
2006	Oral Roberts	
2007	Oral Roberts	
2008	Oral Roberts	
2009	Oral Roberts	
2010	Oral Roberts	
2011	Oral Roberts	
2012	Oral Roberts	
2013	North Dakota State	

Year	Champion	Ref
2014	Denver	
2015	Denver	
2016	Denver	
2017	Denver	
2018	North Dakota State	
2019	Denver	
2020	Not held due to COVID-19	
2021	Denver	
2022	Denver	
2023	Denver	
2024	Denver	
2025	Denver	
2026	South Dakota State	
2027		

== Soccer (men's) ==
Among current Summit League members, the four schools from the Dakotas (North Dakota, North Dakota State, South Dakota, South Dakota State) do not sponsor men's soccer. Although Oral Roberts left the Summit League for the Southland Conference in 2012, it remained a men's soccer affiliate until returning to full Summit League membership in 2014. Eastern Illinois, which had been a full conference member through the 1995 soccer season, returned as a men's soccer affiliate in 2011. Lindenwood and Southern Indiana became men's soccer affiliates in the 2022 season. The Ohio Valley Conference (OVC), full-time home of Eastern Illinois, Lindenwood, and Southern Indiana, started a men's soccer league in 2023, taking with it all three schools. Also in 2023, Western Illinois left the Summit League for full OVC membership, but it kept men's soccer in the Summit League through the 2023 season. In 2025, Delaware and UMass joined the league as an affiliate member in men's soccer.

Among former Summit members, Chicago State, Northern Iowa, Southern Utah, Troy State (now Troy), and Youngstown State did not sponsor men's soccer while in the conference. Valparaiso first sponsored men's soccer in 1988, Southwest Missouri State (now Missouri State) began playing soccer in the conference in 1989, and Oakland did not compete in conference play during its first season as a member in 1998.

Men's soccer titles by school
Team	Seasons	Regular Season	Tournament	Total
Denver	2013–2026	10	9	19
Oakland	1999–2012	9	3	12
Western Illinois	1983–2023	6	6	12
Kansas City (UMKC)	1994–2012; 2020–present	6	4	10
Oral Roberts	1997–present	7	1	8
Eastern Illinois	1983–1995; 2011–2022	6	0	6
Central Connecticut State	1994–1997	2	2	4
Cleveland State	1983–1993	3	X	3
Howard	1996–1998	1	2	3
Omaha	2013–present	2	1	3
Valparaiso	1988–2006	2	1	3
Akron	1990–1991	2	X	2
IUPUI	1999–2016	1	1	2
Buffalo	1994–1997	1	0	1
Northern Illinois	1990–1993	1	X	1
Omaha	2011–present	0	1	1
Wisconsin–Green Bay	1983–1993	1	X	1
Wisconsin–Milwaukee	1993	1	X	1
Centenary	2003–2010	0	0	0
Delaware	2025–present	0	0	0
Lindenwood	2022	0	0	0
Northeastern Illinois	1994–1997	0	0	0
Oneonta State	1996–1997	0	0	0
Purdue Fort Wayne (IPFW, Fort Wayne)	2007–2019	0	0	0
Quincy	1994–1995	0	0	0
St. Thomas	2021–present	0	0	0
SIU Edwardsville	1994–1995	0	0	0
Southern Indiana	2022	0	0	0
Southwest Missouri State	1989	0	X	0
UIC	1983–1993	0	X	0
UMass	2025–present	0	0	0
Wright State	1991–1993	0	X	0

Year	Regular season		Record	Tournament	Ref
1983	Eastern Illinois		4–0–0	Not held	
1984	Cleveland State		3–0–1	Not held	
1985	Eastern Illinois		4–0–0	Not held	
1986	Cleveland State		4–0–0	Not held	
1987	Eastern Illinois		4–0–0	Not held	
1988	Cleveland State; Eastern Illinois		4–0–1	Not held	
1989	Eastern Illinois		6–0–0	Not held	
1990	Akron; Northern Illinois		6–0–1	Not held	
1991	Akron		6–0–0	Not held	
1992	Wisconsin–Green Bay		7–0–0	Not held	
1993	Wisconsin–Milwaukee		8–0–0	Not held	
1994	East	Buffalo	5–0–1	Central Connecticut State	
1994	West	Eastern Illinois	6–1–1	Central Connecticut State	
1995	East	Central Connecticut State	5–0–1	Central Connecticut State	
1995	West	Western Illinois	7–1–0	Central Connecticut State	
1996	East	Howard	6–0–0	Valparaiso	
1996	West	UMKC	5–0–1	Valparaiso	
1997	East	Central Connecticut State	5–1–0	Howard	
1997	West	Valparaiso	6–1–1	Howard	
1998	Valparaiso		3–1–1	Howard	
1999	IUPUI; Oral Roberts; UMKC		3–2–0	Oral Roberts	
2000	Oakland; Western Illinois		4–1–0	IUPUI	
2001	Oakland; Oral Roberts; UMKC		3–2–0	UMKC	
2002	Oakland		3–1–1	Oakland	
2003	Oakland; UMKC		5–1–0	UMKC	
2004	Oral Roberts		5–0–1	Western Illinois	

Year	Regular season	Record	Tournament	Ref
2005	Oakland	5–1–0	Western Illinois	
2006	Western Illinois	5–1–0	Western Illinois	
2007	Oakland	5–0–1	Oakland	
2008	Oakland	5–1–0	UMKC	
2009	Oakland	5–0–1	Western Illinois	
2010	UMKC	4–1–1	Oakland	
2011	Western Illinois	4–2	Western Illinois	
2012	Oakland	5-1-1	Western Illinois	
2013	Denver	6-0-0	Denver	
2014	Denver; Omaha; Oral Roberts; Western Illinois	3–2–1	Denver	
2015	Denver	5–0–1	Denver	
2016	Denver; Omaha	5–0–1	Denver	
2017	Denver	5–0–0	Omaha	
2018	Denver	4–0–1	Denver	
2019	Oral Roberts; Western Illinois	4–1–0	Denver	
2020	Denver	6–2–0	Not held	
2021	Denver; Oral Roberts	4–1–1	Denver	
2022	Oral Roberts	7–1–0	Denver	
2023	Denver	7–0–1	Omaha	
2024	Denver	7–1–0	Kansas City	
2025	Denver; Kansas City	4–1–1	Denver	
2026				

== Soccer (women's) ==
Since the Summit League began sponsoring women's soccer in 1999, all current Summit League members have sponsored women's soccer throughout their conference tenures except Kansas City, which did not sponsor women's soccer until 2009.

Among former Summit members present during the existence of a women's soccer championship, only Chicago State never sponsored women's soccer while a member.

Women's soccer titles by school
Team	Seasons	Regular Season	Tournament	Total
Oakland	1999–2012	8	8	16
South Dakota State	2007–present	6	9	15
Denver	2013–2026	8	5	13
Oral Roberts	1999–2011; 2014–present	5	3	8
North Dakota State	2007–present	4	1	5
IUPUI	1999–2016	2	1	3
Valparaiso	1999–2006	2	1	3
Omaha	2012–present	0	1	1
Western Illinois	1999–2022	1	0	1
Centenary	2003–2010	0	0	0
Kansas City (UMKC)	2009–2012; 2020–present	0	0	0
North Dakota	2018–present	0	0	0
Purdue Fort Wayne (IPFW, Fort Wayne)	2007–2019	0	0	0
St. Thomas	2021–present	0	0	0
Southern Utah	2001–2021	0	0	0
South Dakota	2011–present	0	0	0
Youngstown State	1999–2000	0	0	0

Year	Regular season	Record	Tournament	Ref
1999	Oakland	5–0–0	Oral Roberts	
2000	Oakland; Oral Roberts	4–1–0	Oakland	
2001	Oakland	5–0–0	Oakland	
2002	Oral Roberts	5–0–0	Oakland	
2003	Oakland	6–0–0	Oakland	
2004	Oral Roberts	5–1–0	Oral Roberts	
2005	Oakland; Valparaiso	4–2–0	Valparaiso	
2006	Valparaiso	4–0–2	Oakland	
2007	Western Illinois	8–0–0	Oakland	
2008	IUPUI; Oakland; South Dakota State	7–1–0	South Dakota State	
2009	IUPUI; North Dakota State; South Dakota State	7–1–0	IUPUI	
2010	Oakland	8–0–1	North Dakota State	
2011	South Dakota State	8–0–1	Oakland	
2012	Oakland	6–2–0	Oakland	
2013	Denver	7–0–0	Denver	
2014	South Dakota State	5–2–1	South Dakota State	

Year	Regular season	Record	Tournament	Ref
2015	North Dakota State	7–0–1	South Dakota State	
2016	Denver; North Dakota State	5–2–1	South Dakota State	
2017	South Dakota State	7–0–0	Denver	
2018	Denver; South Dakota State	7–1–0	Denver	
2019	Denver	7–0–1	South Dakota State	
2020	Denver	14–1–1	Denver	
2021	Denver	8–0–1	South Dakota State	
2022	Denver	8–0–1	Omaha	
2023	Denver	5–1–2	South Dakota State	
2024	North Dakota State	6–1–1	South Dakota State	
2025	Oral Roberts; Denver	6–1–1	South Dakota State	
2026	Oral Roberts	8–0–2	Oral Roberts	

== Softball ==
Since the Summit League began sponsoring softball in the 1993 season (1992–93 school year), the only current Summit member that has never sponsored the sport is Oral Roberts.

Among former members that were present during the era of Summit League softball, Buffalo, Chicago State, Denver, and Wisconsin–Milwaukee did not sponsor softball during their conference tenures.

Softball titles by school
Team	Season	Regular Season	Tournament	Total
North Dakota State	2008–present	8	10	18
Western Illinois	1993–2023	9	4	13
DePaul	1993–1999	5	4	9
South Dakota State	2008–present	4	2	6
Southern Utah	1998–2012	4	2	6
Omaha	2013–present	1	3	4
Oakland	2000–2013	1	2	3
Centenary	2004–2011	0	2	2
Kansas City (UMKC)	1995–2013; 2021–present	2	0	2
UIC	1993–1994	1	1	2
St. Thomas	2022–present	1	0	1
South Dakota	2012–present	0	1	1
IUPUI	1999–2017	1	0	1
Purdue Fort Wayne (IPFW, Fort Wayne)	2008–2020	0	1	1
Troy State	1995–1997	0	1	1
Central Connecticut State	1995–1998	0	0	0
Cleveland State	1993–1994	0	0	0
Eastern Illinois	1993–1996	0	0	0
North Dakota	2019–present	0	0	0
Northeastern Illinois	1995–1998	0	0	0
Northern Illinois	1993–1994	0	0	0
Valparaiso	1993–2007	0	0	0
Wisconsin–Green Bay	1993–1994	0	0	0
Wright State	1993–1994	0	0	0
Youngstown State	1993–2001	0	0	0

Year	Regular season		Record	Tournament	Ref
1993	Western Illinois		14–2	Western Illinois	
1994	UIC		17–0	UIC	
1995	East	DePaul	10–2	DePaul	
1995	West	Western Illinois	16–0	DePaul	
1996	East	DePaul	10–2	Troy State	
1996	West	Western Illinois	12–2	Troy State	
1997	East	DePaul	12–0	DePaul	
1997	West	Western Illinois	9–3	DePaul	
1998	East	DePaul	10–0	DePaul	
1998	West	Western Illinois	9–2	DePaul	
1999	DePaul		22–0	DePaul	
2000	Western Illinois		21–1	Western Illinois	
2001	Oakland		16–6	Western Illinois	
2002	UMKC		16–3	Oakland	
2003	Southern Utah		16–3	Oakland	
2004	Southern Utah		19–5	Centenary	
2005	Southern Utah		18–6	Centenary	
2006	Southern Utah		21–3	Southern Utah	
2007	Western Illinois		11–2	Southern Utah	

Year	Regular season	Record	Tournament	Ref
2008	North Dakota State	14–2	Western Illinois	
2009	Western Illinois	21–2	North Dakota State	
2010	Western Illinois	19–2	North Dakota State	
2011	UMKC	18–5	North Dakota State	
2012	North Dakota State	18–6	North Dakota State	
2013	North Dakota State	17–1	IPFW	
2014	North Dakota State	13–3	North Dakota State	
2015	North Dakota State	16–2	North Dakota State	
2016	North Dakota State	17–0	North Dakota State	
2017	IUPUI	11–6	North Dakota State	
2018	North Dakota State	10–3	North Dakota State	
2019	North Dakota State	16–2	North Dakota State	
2020	Season canceled due to COVID-19			
2021	South Dakota State	21–1	South Dakota State	
2022	South Dakota State	18–2	South Dakota State	
2023	South Dakota State	17–0	Omaha	
2024	South Dakota State	14–2	Omaha	
2025	Omaha; St. Thomas	14–4	Omaha	
2026	Omaha	15–2	South Dakota	
2027				

== Swimming and diving (men's) ==
Only three full Summit members sponsor men's swimming & diving: St. Thomas, South Dakota, and South Dakota State. Of these schools, two began participating as affiliate members before becoming part of the core conference membership. South Dakota State was an affiliate in 2005–06 and 2006–07, and South Dakota was an affiliate in 2009–10 and 2010–11. No other full members have ever sponsored the sport while in the conference.

Eastern Illinois, which had sponsored the sport throughout its tenure as a full Summit member (ending in 1996), rejoined as a swimming & diving affiliate from the 2005–06 season. Lindenwood and Southern Indiana joined as swimming & diving affiliates in 2022–23.

Among former Summit members, Akron, Chicago State, Purdue Fort Wayne, Southern Utah, Troy State, and Youngstown State never sponsored men's swimming & diving while in the conference. Cleveland State and Valparaiso didn't sponsor men's swimming & diving until 1992–93, and Centenary didn't sponsor the sport until 2004–05. Valparaiso rejoined as a swimming & diving affiliate, although with only swimmers and no divers, beginning in the 2017–18 season, leaving after the 2020–21 season for single-sport membership in the Mid-American Conference.

In the tables below, seasons are denoted by the calendar years in which they ended.

Men's swimming and diving titles by school
Team	Season	Total
Oakland	2000–2013	14
Denver	2014–2026	12
Western Illinois	1983–2023	8
Southwest Missouri State	1983–1990	6
Buffalo	1995–1998	1
Northern Illinois	1990–1994	1
South Dakota	2010–present	1
Wright State	1992–1994	1
Centenary	2005–2011	0
Central Connecticut State	1995–1998	0
Cleveland State	1993–1994	0
Eastern Illinois	1983–1996; 2006–present	0
IUPUI	1999–2017	0
Northeastern Illinois	1995–1997	0
Northern Illinois	1990–1994	0
Northern Iowa	1983–1991	0
St. Thomas	2022–present	0
South Dakota State	2006–present	0
UIC	1983–1994	0
Valparaiso	1993–2007; 2018–2021	0
Wisconsin–Green Bay	1985; 1993–1994	0
Wisconsin–Milwaukee	1993–1994	0
Wright State	1992–1994	0

Year	Champion	Ref
1982–83	Southwest Missouri State	
1983–84	Southwest Missouri State	
1984–85	Western Illinois	
1985–86	Western Illinois	
1986–87	Southwest Missouri State	
1987–88	Southwest Missouri State	
1988–89	Southwest Missouri State	
1989–90	Southwest Missouri State	
1990–91	Northern Illinois	
1991–92	Wright State	
1992–93	Western Illinois	
1993–94	Western Illinois	
1994–95	Buffalo	
1995–96	Western Illinois	
1996–97	Western Illinois	
1997–98	Western Illinois	
1998–99	Western Illinois	
1999–00	Oakland	
2000–01	Oakland	
2001–02	Oakland	
2002–03	Oakland	
2003–04	Oakland	
2004–05	Oakland	

Year	Champion	Ref
2005–06	Oakland	
2006–07	Oakland	
2007–08	Oakland	
2008–09	Oakland	
2009–10	Oakland	
2010–11	Oakland	
2011–12	Oakland	
2012–13	Oakland	
2013–14	Denver	
2014–15	Denver	
2015–16	Denver	
2016–17	Denver	
2017–18	Denver	
2018–19	Denver	
2019–20	Denver	
2020–21	South Dakota	
2021–22	Denver	
2022–23	Denver	
2023–24	Denver	
2024–25	Denver	
2025–26	Denver	
2026–27		

== Swimming and diving (women's) ==
Among current Summit members, Kansas City, North Dakota, North Dakota State, and Oral Roberts do not sponsor women's swimming & diving.

Both South Dakota schools began participating as affiliate members in swimming & diving before becoming part of the core conference membership; each joined for both men's and women's competition at the same time. South Dakota State competed in 2005–06 and 2006–07, and South Dakota in 2009–10 and 2010–11.

The current roster of Summit women's swimming & diving members as of 2022–23 also includes Eastern Illinois, Lindenwood, and Southern Indiana. EIU added women's swimming & diving in 1992–93 and competed in the Summit through 1995–96, and rejoined as swimming & diving affiliates in 2005 (2005–06 season). Lindenwood and Southern Indiana joined for swimming & diving in 2022–23. Lindenwood left after the 2023–24 season.

Among former members, Chicago State, Purdue Fort Wayne, Southern Utah, and Troy did not sponsor women's swimming and diving while Summit League members. Youngstown State didn't sponsor women's swimming and diving until the 1997 school year. Centenary didn't sponsor women's swimming and diving until the 2005 school year.

Women's swimming and diving titles by school
Team	Season	Total
Oakland	2000–2013	14
Denver	2014–2026	13
Buffalo	1995–1998	4
Wright State	1993–1994	2
Western Illinois	1993–2023	1
Central Connecticut State	1995–1998	0
Centenary	2005–2011	0
Cleveland State	1993–1994	0
Eastern Illinois	1993–1996; 2006–present	0
IUPUI	1999–2017	0
Northeastern Illinois	1995–1997	0
Northern Illinois	1993–1994	0
Omaha	2013–present	0
St. Thomas	2022–present	0
South Dakota	2010–present	0
South Dakota State	2006–present	0
UIC	1993–1994	0
Valparaiso	1993–2007	0
Wisconsin–Green Bay	1993–1994	0
Wisconsin–Milwaukee	1993–1994	0
Youngstown State	1997–2001	0

Year	Champion	Ref
1992–93	Wright State	
1993–94	Wright State	
1994–95	Buffalo	
1995–96	Buffalo	
1996–97	Buffalo	
1997–98	Buffalo	
1998–99	Western Illinois	
1999–00	Oakland	
2000–01	Oakland	
2001–02	Oakland	
2002–03	Oakland	
2003–04	Oakland	
2004–05	Oakland	
2005–06	Oakland	
2006–07	Oakland	
2007–08	Oakland	
2008–09	Oakland	

Year	Champion	Ref
2009–10	Oakland	
2010–11	Oakland	
2011–12	Oakland	
2012–13	Oakland	
2013–14	Denver	
2014–15	Denver	
2015–16	Denver	
2016–17	Denver	
2017–18	Denver	
2018–19	Denver	
2019–20	Denver	
2020–21	Denver	
2021–22	Denver	
2022–23	Denver	
2023–24	Denver	
2024–25	Denver	
2025–26	Denver	
2026–27		

== Tennis (men's) ==
Men's tennis began crowning a regular season champion in 1998, and continued as a sponsored sport until 2026 after the departure of full-time member Denver and the discontinuation of North Dakota and affiliate member Illinois State's men's tennis programs - the league decided to stop sponsoring the sport. The three schools that still sponsored men's tennis at the time of discontinuation, were full members Omaha and Oral Roberts as well as affiliate member Drake. Omaha and Drake moved their programs to the Mid-American Conference while Oral Roberts joined the Horizon League.

Among current Summit members, North Dakota State, St. Thomas, and South Dakota never sponsored the sport as Summit members. Kansas City (formerly UMKC) sponsored the sport in their first stint as a full Summit member from 1998–2012, however they discontinued their program in 2019 before they rejoined the conference in 2020. South Dakota State sponsored the sport until 2018. North Dakota sponsored men's tennis up until 2026.

The conference had two schools become affiliate members in the sport, that had never been a full time member, in Drake and Illinois State. Both schools joined as men's tennis affiliates in 2017–18. Illinois State though would discontinue their men's tennis program in 2026.

Among former members, Oakland and Southern Utah never sponsored men's tennis while in the league, Cleveland State dropped men's tennis after the 1991–92 season, Purdue Fort Wayne (then IPFW) dropped the sport after the 2014–15 season, and Western Illinois did the same after the 2015–16 season. Valparaiso sponsored men's tennis throughout its tenure as a full member, and returned as a men's tennis affiliate in 2017–18, but dropped the sport after the 2019–20 season.

Men's tennis titles by school
Team	Season	Regular Season	Tournament	Total
Denver	2014–2026	10	9	19
Oral Roberts	1998–2012; 2015–2026	6	9	15
Kansas City (UMKC)	1995–2013	7	6	13
Southwest Missouri State	1983–1990	X	7	7
Drake	2018–2026	1	4	5
Northern Illinois	1990–1994	X	4	4
Western Illinois	1983–2016	1	3	4
IUPUI	1999–2017	2	0	2
Eastern Illinois	1983–1996	X	1	1
Purdue Fort Wayne (IPFW)	2008–2015	1	0	1
Troy State	1995–1997	X	1	1
Valparaiso	1983–2007; 2018–2020	1	0	1
Akron	1990–1992	X	0	0
Buffalo	1995–1998	0	0	0
Centenary	2004–2011	0	0	0
Central Connecticut State	1995–1997	X	0	0
Chicago State	1995–2006	0	0	0
Cleveland State	1985–1992	X	0	0
Illinois State	2018–2026	0	0	0
North Dakota	2019–2026	0	0	0
Northeastern Illinois	1995–1998	0	0	0
Northern Iowa	1983–1991	X	0	0
Omaha	2013–2026	0	0	0
South Dakota State	2008–2018	0	0	0
UIC	1983; 1985–1994	X	0	0
Wisconsin–Green Bay	1984; 1986–1994	X	0	0
Wisconsin–Milwaukee	1993–1994	X	0	0
Wright State	1992–1993	X	0	0
Youngstown State	1992–2001	0	0	0

Year	Regular season	Record	Tournament	Ref
1983	Not held		Eastern Illinois	
1984	Not held		Southwest Missouri State	
1985	Not held		Southwest Missouri State	
1986	Not held		Southwest Missouri State	
1987	Not held		Southwest Missouri State	
1988	Not held		Southwest Missouri State	
1989	Not held		Southwest Missouri State	
1990	Not held		Southwest Missouri State	
1991	Not held		Northern Illinois	
1992	Not held		Northern Illinois	
1993	Not held		Northern Illinois	
1994	Not held		Northern Illinois	
1995	Not held		Western Illinois	
1996	Not held		Western Illinois	
1997	Not held		Troy State	
1998	UMKC	14–5 *	Oral Roberts	
1999	UMKC	6–0	UMKC	
2000	UMKC	6–0	UMKC	
2001	Oral Roberts	6–0	Oral Roberts	
2002	Valparaiso	5–0	Oral Roberts	
2003	Oral Roberts	4–0–1	Oral Roberts	
2004	IUPUI	6–0	Oral Roberts	
2005	Oral Roberts	6–0	Oral Roberts	

Year	Regular season	Record	Tournament	Ref
2006	Oral Roberts	6–0	Western Illinois	
2007	Oral Roberts	5–0	Oral Roberts	
2008	Western Illinois	6–0	Oral Roberts	
2009	Oral Roberts	6–0	UMKC	
2010	UMKC	6–0	Oral Roberts	
2011	UMKC	6–0	UMKC	
2012	IPFW; IUPUI; UMKC	4–1	UMKC	
2013	UMKC	5–0	UMKC	
2014	Denver	5–0	Denver	
2015	Denver	6–0	Denver	
2016	Denver	5–0	Denver	
2017	Denver	5–0	Denver	
2018	Drake	5–0	Drake	
2019	Denver	6–0	Drake	
2020	Season canceled due to COVID-19			
2021	Denver	5–0	Denver	
2022	Denver	5–0	Drake	
2023	Denver	5–0	Drake	
2024	Denver	7–0–1	Denver	
2025	Denver	5–0	Denver	
2026	Denver	5–0	Denver	

* Overall record. The Summit League did not play a conference regular season schedule.

== Tennis (women's) ==
Women's tennis began crowning a regular season champion in 1999. An X denotes never competing in a season in which a regular-season championship was awarded.

Among current Summit members; Kansas City, North Dakota, North Dakota State, and South Dakota State do not sponsor women's tennis. Kansas City sponsored the sport the entire time they were a full league member in their first stint (1994-2012), but discontinued the sport in 2019 before they rejoined the Summit in 2020. South Dakota State stopped sponsoring the sport in 2018, North Dakota stopped sponsoring the sport in 2026, while North Dakota State has never sponsored the sport while they have been a Summit member.

Women's tennis titles by school
Team	Season	Regular Season	Tournament	Total
Denver	2014–2026	12	12	24
Oral Roberts	1998–2012; 2015–present	7	9	16
Purdue Fort Wayne (IPFW)	2008–2015	4	3	7
Valparaiso	1994–2007	3	2	5
IUPUI	1999–2017	1	2	3
Central Connecticut State	1996–1997	X	2	2
Northern Illinois	1993–1994	X	2	2
Troy State	1995–1997	X	1	1
Buffalo	1995–1998	X	0	0
Centenary	2004–2011	0	0	0
Chicago State	1995–2006	0	0	0
Cleveland State	1994	X	0	0
Eastern Illinois	1993–1996	X	0	0
Kansas City (UMKC)	1998–2013	0	0	0
North Dakota	2019–2026	0	0	0
Northeastern Illinois	1995–1997	X	0	0
Oakland	2000–2013	0	0	0
Omaha	2013–present	0	0	0
St. Thomas	2022–present	0	0	0
South Dakota	2012–present	0	0	0
South Dakota State	2008–2018	0	0	0
Southern Utah	1998–2012	0	0	0
UIC	1993–1994	X	0	0
Western Illinois	1993–2023	0	0	0
Wisconsin–Green Bay	1993–1994	X	0	0
Wisconsin–Milwaukee	1993–1994	X	0	0
Wright State	1993–1994	X	0	0
Youngstown State	1993–2001	0	0	0

Year	Regular season	Record	Tournament	Ref
1993	Not held		Northern Illinois	
1994	Not held		Northern Illinois	
1995	Not held		Troy State	
1996	Not held		Central Connecticut State	
1997	Not held		Central Connecticut State	
1998	Not held		Oral Roberts	
1999	Oral Roberts	7–0	Oral Roberts	
2000	Oral Roberts	8–0	Oral Roberts	
2001	Oral Roberts	8–0	Oral Roberts	
2002	Oral Roberts	7–0	Oral Roberts	
2003	IUPUI	7–0	IUPUI	
2004	Valparaiso	8–0	IUPUI	
2005	Valparaiso	8–0	Valparaiso	
2006	Valparaiso	8–0	Valparaiso	
2007	Oral Roberts	7–0	Oral Roberts	
2008	Oral Roberts	8–0	Oral Roberts	
2009	IPFW	8–0	Oral Roberts	
2010	IPFW	8–0	IPFW	

Year	Regular season	Record	Tournament	Ref
2011	IPFW	8–0	IPFW	
2012	Oral Roberts	8–0	Oral Roberts	
2013	IPFW	7–0	IPFW	
2014	Denver	6–0	Denver	
2015	Denver	7–0	Denver	
2016	Denver	6–0	Denver	
2017	Denver	6–0	Denver	
2018	Denver	4–0	Denver	
2019	Denver	5–0	Denver	
2020	Season canceled due to COVID-19			
2021	Denver	5–0	Denver	
2022	Denver	7–0	Denver	
2023	Denver	6–0	Denver	
2024	Denver	6–0	Denver	
2025	Denver	6–0	Denver	
2026	Denver	6–0	Denver	
2027				

== Track and field (men's) ==
Seasons are listed by the calendar years in which they ended. Schools without the indoor and outdoor designation competed in those years in both indoor and outdoor. All current Summit members sponsor men's track and field except Omaha; all currently sponsoring schools have done so throughout their conference tenures.

Among former Summit members, Centenary, Denver, Northeastern Illinois, Northern Illinois, Wisconsin–Green Bay, and Wisconsin–Milwaukee did not sponsor men's track and field while in the conference. Cleveland State didn't participate in the 1990 indoor track and field championship. Valparaiso began sponsoring men's track and field in 1996, Oakland did the same in 2006, and IUPUI started sponsoring only the outdoor form of the sport in 2013. Purdue Fort Wayne dropped the sport while an NCAA Division II member in 2005 and did not reinstate it until the 2019–20 season, its last as a Summit member. Western Illinois dropped men's track and field in 1992, but reinstated it in 1994 and remained active in both indoor and outdoor track until departing the Summit in 2023.

Men's track and field titles by school
Team	Seasons	Indoor	Outdoor	Total
North Dakota State	2008–present	11	16	27
Eastern Illinois	1984–1992 (indoor); 1983–1992 (outdoor); 1995–1996	6	9	15
Southern Utah	1998–2012	3	6	9
Northern Iowa	1984–1991 (indoor); 1983–1991 (outdoor)	5	3	8
Oral Roberts	1998–2012; 2015–present	7	1	8
South Dakota	2012–present	5	1	6
Kansas City (UMKC)	1995–2013; 2021–present	1	2	3
South Dakota State	2008–present	2	1	3
Western Illinois	1984–1992 (indoor); 1983–1992 (outdoor); 1995–2023	0	2	2
Youngstown State	1992; 1995–2001	1	1	2
Akron	1990–1992	0	0	0
Buffalo	1995–1998	0	0	0
Central Connecticut State	1996 (indoor); 1995–1997 (outdoor)	0	0	0
Chicago State	1995–2006	0	0	0
Cleveland State	1986–1989 (indoor); 1991–1992 (indoor); 1983–1992 (outdoor)	0	0	0
IUPUI	N/A (indoor); 2013–2017 (outdoor)	X	0	0
North Dakota	2019–present	0	0	0
Oakland	2008–2013 (indoor); 2006–2013 (outdoor)	0	0	0
Purdue Fort Wayne	2020	0	0	0
St. Thomas	2022–present	0	0	0
Southwest Missouri State	1984–1990 (indoor); 1983–1990 (outdoor)	0	0	0
Troy State	1995–1996 (indoor); 1995–1997 (outdoor)	0	0	0
UIC	1984–1986 (indoor); 1991–1992 (indoor); 1983–1986 (outdoor); 1990 (outdoor); 1992 (outdoor)	0	0	0
Valparaiso	1995–2007 (indoor); 1996–2007 (outdoor)	0	0	0
Wright State	N/A (indoor); 1992 (outdoor)	X	0	0

=== Indoor ===
Year	Champion	Ref
1983–84	Northern Iowa	
1984–85	Northern Iowa	
1985–86	Northern Iowa	
1986–87	Eastern Illinois	
1987–88	Northern Iowa	
1988–89	Eastern Illinois	
1989–90	Northern Iowa	
1990–91	Eastern Illinois	
1991–92	Eastern Illinois	
1992–93	Not held	
1993–94	Not held	
1994–95	Eastern Illinois	
1995–96	Eastern Illinois	
1996–97	Youngstown State	
1997–98	Oral Roberts	
1998–99	Oral Roberts	
1999–00	UMKC	
2000–01	Oral Roberts	
2001–02	Oral Roberts	
2002–03	Oral Roberts	
2003–04	Southern Utah	
2004–05	Oral Roberts	

Year	Champion	Ref
2005–06	Oral Roberts	
2006–07	Southern Utah	
2007–08	North Dakota State	
2008–09	North Dakota State	
2009–10	North Dakota State	
2010–11	North Dakota State	
2011–12	Southern Utah	
2012–13	South Dakota	
2013–14	South Dakota	
2014–15	South Dakota	
2015–16	North Dakota State	
2016–17	North Dakota State	
2017–18	North Dakota State	
2018–19	North Dakota State	
2019–20	North Dakota State	
2020–21	North Dakota State	
2021–22	South Dakota State	
2022–23	South Dakota	
2023–24	South Dakota	
2024–25	South Dakota State	
2025–26	North Dakota State	
2026–27		

=== Outdoor ===
Year	Champion	Ref
1983	Northern Iowa	
1984	Northern Iowa	
1985	Eastern Illinois	
1986	Northern Iowa	
1987	Eastern Illinois	
1988	Eastern Illinois	
1989	Eastern Illinois	
1990	Eastern Illinois	
1991	Eastern Illinois	
1992	Eastern Illinois	
1993	Not held	
1994	Not held	
1995	Eastern Illinois	
1996	Eastern Illinois	
1997	Youngstown State	
1998	Southern Utah	
1999	UMKC	
2000	UMKC	
2001	Western Illinois	
2002	Western Illinois	
2003	Oral Roberts	
2004	Southern Utah	
2005	Southern Utah	

Year	Champion	Ref
2006	Southern Utah	
2007	Southern Utah	
2008	North Dakota State	
2009	Southern Utah	
2010	North Dakota State	
2011	North Dakota State	
2012	North Dakota State	
2013	North Dakota State	
2014	North Dakota State; South Dakota	
2015	North Dakota State	
2016	North Dakota State	
2017	North Dakota State	
2018	North Dakota State	
2019	North Dakota State	
2020	Not held due to COVID-19	
2021	North Dakota State	
2022	North Dakota State	
2023	North Dakota State	
2024	North Dakota State	
2025	South Dakota State	
2026	North Dakota State	
2027		

== Track and field (women's) ==
Seasons are listed by the calendar years in which they ended; for example, the 2001–02 school year is listed as 2002. Schools without the indoor and outdoor designation competed in those years in both indoor and outdoor.

All current Summit members sponsor women's track and field.

Among former members, Valparaiso started its women's track and field program in 1996, Oakland did the same in 2006, and IUPUI started sponsoring only the outdoor form of the sport in 2013. Centenary, Denver, and Northeastern Illinois never sponsored women's track and field while conference members.

Women's track and field titles by school
Team	Season	Indoor	Outdoor	Total
North Dakota State	2008–present	18	17	35
Southern Utah	1998–2012	4	5	9
Oral Roberts	1998–2012; 2015–present	6	2	8
Kansas City (UMKC)	1995–2013; 2021–present	2	2	4
Buffalo	1995–1998	1	1	2
Western Illinois	1995–2023	0	2	2
Youngstown State	1995–2001	1	1	2
South Dakota	2012–present	1	1	2
Central Connecticut State	1996 (indoor); 1995–1997 (outdoor)	0	0	0
Chicago State	1995–2006	0	0	0
Eastern Illinois	1995–1996	0	0	0
IUPUI	?–2017 (indoor); 2013–2017 (outdoor)	X	0	0
North Dakota	2019–present	0	0	0
Oakland	2008–2013 (indoor); 2006–2013 (outdoor)	0	0	0
Omaha	2013–present	0	0	0
Purdue Fort Wayne (IPFW, Fort Wayne)	2008–2020	0	0	0
St. Thomas	2022–present	0	0	0
South Dakota State	2008–present	0	0	0
Troy State	1995–1997	0	0	0
Valparaiso	1996–2007	0	0	0

=== Indoor ===
Year	Champion	Ref
1994–95	Buffalo	
1995–96	Youngstown State	
1996–97	UMKC	
1997–98	Southern Utah	
1998–99	UMKC	
1999–00	Oral Roberts	
2000–01	Oral Roberts; Southern Utah	
2001–02	Oral Roberts	
2002–03	Southern Utah	
2003–04	Southern Utah	
2004–05	Oral Roberts	
2005–06	Oral Roberts	
2006–07	Oral Roberts	
2007–08	North Dakota State	
2008–09	North Dakota State	

Year	Champion	Ref
2009–10	North Dakota State	
2010–11	North Dakota State	
2011–12	North Dakota State	
2012–13	North Dakota State	
2013–14	North Dakota State	
2014–15	North Dakota State	
2015–16	North Dakota State	
2016–17	North Dakota State	
2017–18	North Dakota State	
2018–19	North Dakota State	
2019–20	North Dakota State	
2020–21	North Dakota State	
2021–22	North Dakota State	
2022–23	South Dakota	
2023–24	North Dakota State	
2024–25	North Dakota State	
2025–26	North Dakota State	
2026–27		

=== Outdoor ===
Year	Champion	Ref
1995	Buffalo	
1996	Western Illinois	
1997	Youngstown State	
1998	Southern Utah	
1999	UMKC	
2000	UMKC	
2001	Southern Utah	
2002	Oral Roberts	
2003	Southern Utah	
2004	Southern Utah	
2005	Western Illinois	
2006	Oral Roberts	
2007	Southern Utah	
2008	North Dakota State	
2009	North Dakota State	
2010	North Dakota State	

Year	Champion	Ref
2011	North Dakota State	
2012	North Dakota State	
2013	North Dakota State	
2014	North Dakota State	
2015	North Dakota State	
2016	North Dakota State	
2017	North Dakota State	
2018	North Dakota State; South Dakota	
2019	North Dakota State	
2020	Not held due to COVID-19	
2021	North Dakota State	
2022	South Dakota	
2023	North Dakota State	
2024	North Dakota State	
2025	North Dakota State	
2026	North Dakota State	
2027		

== Volleyball ==
Division titles count as full regular season titles.

All current Summit League members have sponsored women's volleyball during their respective tenures in the conference. The conference has never sponsored men's volleyball, and no current full member has a men's program.

Among former members, Oakland did not participate in Summit League volleyball until the 1999 season, and Southern Utah did not join Summit League women's volleyball until 2009.

Women's volleyball titles by school
Team	Seasons	Regular Season	Tournament	Total
Oral Roberts	1997–2011; 2014–present	7	7	14
Valparaiso	1992–2006	7	6	13
Denver	2013–2026	6	5	11
South Dakota	2011–present	3	5	8
North Dakota State	2007–present	4	3	7
IUPUI	1998–2016	4	1	5
South Dakota State	2007–present	3	1	4
Northern Illinois	1992–1993	2	2	4
Omaha	2012–present	2	1	3
Purdue Fort Wayne (IPFW, Fort Wayne)	2007–2019	1	2	3
Buffalo	1994–1997	2	0	2
Youngstown State	1992–2000	2	0	2
Central Connecticut State	1994–1997	1	0	1
Eastern Illinois	1992–1995	1	0	1
Kansas City (UMKC)	1994–2012; 2020–present	1	0	1
St. Thomas	2021–present	0	1	1
Troy State	1994–1996	1	0	1
Centenary	2003–2010	0	0	0
Chicago State	1994–2005	0	0	0
Cleveland State	1992–1993	0	0	0
North Dakota	2018–present	0	0	0
Northeastern Illinois	1994–1997	0	0	0
Oakland	1999–2012	0	0	0
Southern Utah	2009–2011	0	0	0
UIC	1992–1993	0	0	0
Western Illinois	1992–2022	0	0	0
Wisconsin–Green Bay	1992–1993	0	0	0
Wisconsin–Milwaukee	1993	0	0	0
Wright State	1992–1993	0	0	0

Year	Regular season		Record	Tournament	Ref
1992	Northern Illinois		16–0	Northern Illinois	
1993	Northern Illinois		18–0	Northern Illinois	
1994	East	Central Connecticut State	6–0	Valparaiso	
1994	West	Eastern Illinois; Valparaiso	9–1	Valparaiso	
1995	East	Youngstown State	5–1	Valparaiso	
1995	West	Valparaiso	9–1	Valparaiso	
1996	East	Buffalo; Troy State	5–1	Valparaiso	
1996	West	Valparaiso	7–1	Valparaiso	
1997	East	Buffalo; Valparaiso	5–1	Oral Roberts	
1997	West	Oral Roberts	8–0	Oral Roberts	
1998	Oral Roberts		12–0	Oral Roberts	
1999	Oral Roberts; Youngstown State		13–1	Oral Roberts	
2000	IUPUI; Oral Roberts		13–1	Oral Roberts	
2001	Oral Roberts		11–1	Oral Roberts	
2002	Oral Roberts		11–1	Oral Roberts	
2003	Valparaiso		13–1	Valparaiso	
2004	Valparaiso		14–0	Valparaiso	
2005	Valparaiso		13–1	Valparaiso	

Year	Regular season	Record	Tournament	Ref
2006	Oral Roberts	11–1	Oral Roberts	
2007	South Dakota State	13–3	South Dakota State	
2008	North Dakota State	16–0	North Dakota State	
2009	North Dakota State	18–0	IPFW	
2010	IPFW; North Dakota State	14–4	North Dakota State	
2011	North Dakota State	16–2	North Dakota State	
2012	IUPUI	13–3	IPFW	
2013	IUPUI	11–3	IUPUI	
2014	Denver; IUPUI	13–3	Denver	
2015	Denver	13–3	Denver	
2016	Denver; South Dakota	13–3	Denver	
2017	Denver	12–2	Denver	
2018	Denver	15–0	South Dakota	
2019	South Dakota	16–0	Denver	
2020	Denver	13–2	South Dakota	
2021	Omaha	16–2	South Dakota	
2022	South Dakota	16–2	South Dakota	
2023	Kansas City	12–4	Omaha	
2024	South Dakota State	15–1	South Dakota	
2025	South Dakota State	16–0	St. Thomas	
2026				
