= Memorial Athletic and Convocation Center =

Multi-purpose arena on the campus of Kent State University

- MAC Center, MACC
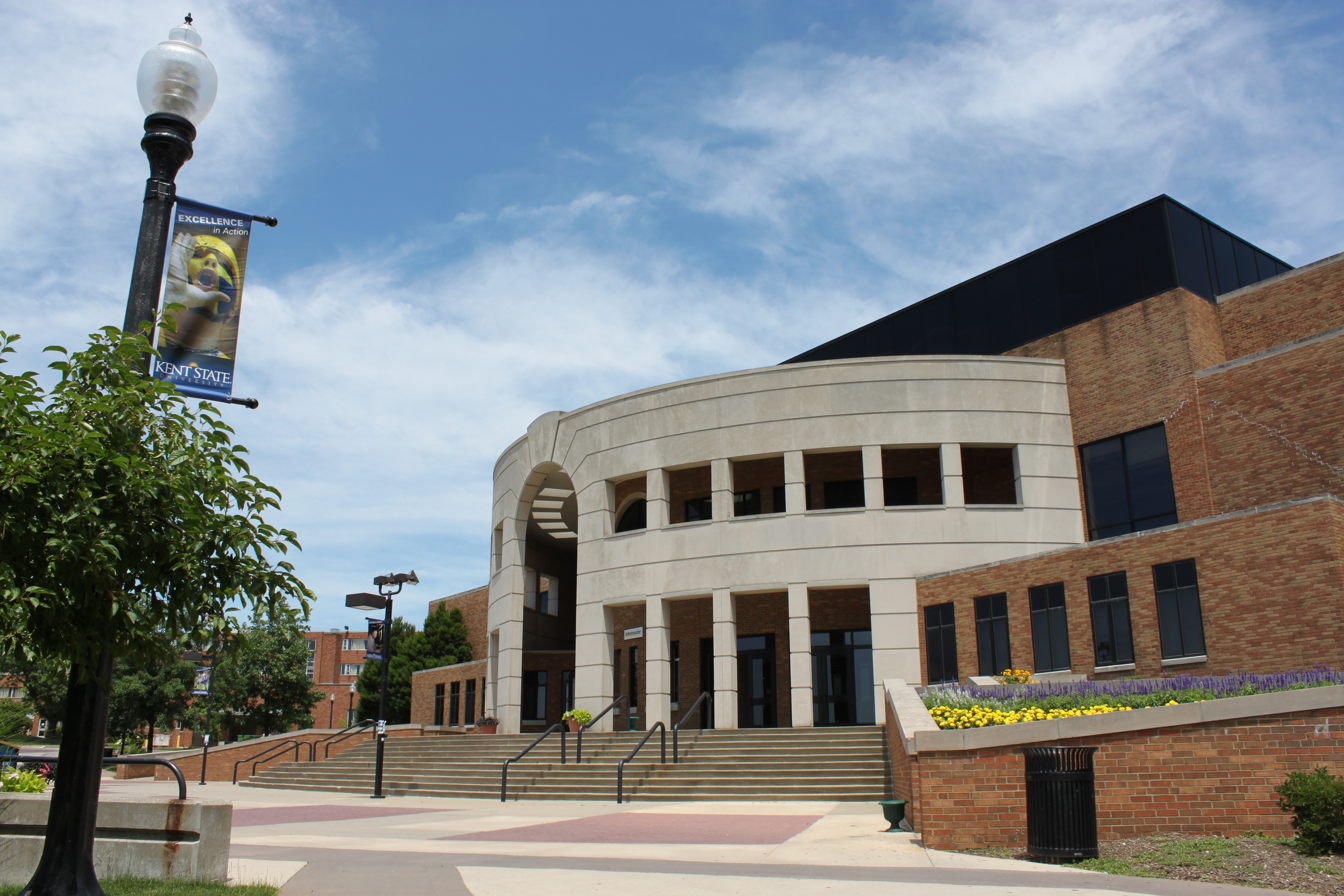
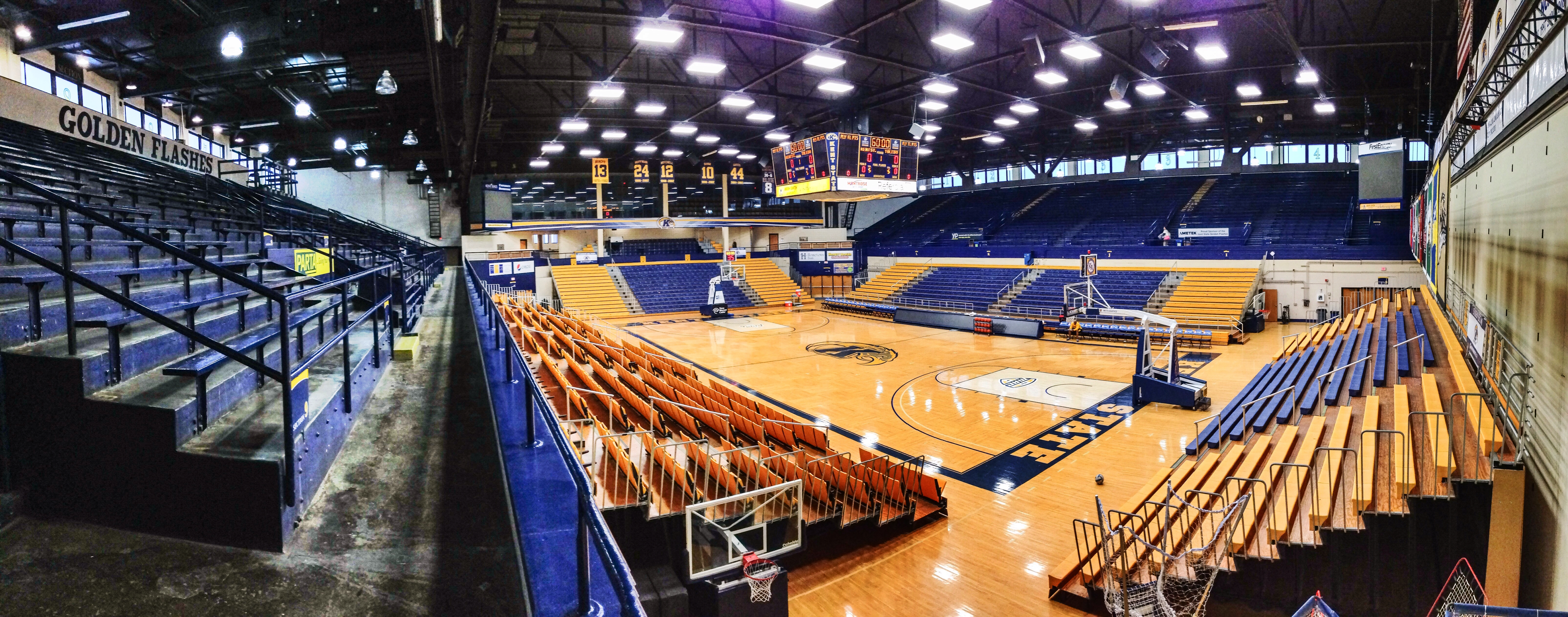
- Exterior in 2009; Interior in 2015
- Interactive map of Memorial Athletic and Convocation Center
- Former names: Men's Physical Education Building (1950–1956); Memorial Gym (1956–1991)
- Location: 1025 Risman Drive; Kent, Ohio 44242; United States
- Coordinates: 41°08′53″N 81°20′38″W
- Owner: Kent State University
- Operator: Kent State University
- Capacity: 6,327
- Surface: Hardwood

Construction
- Groundbreaking: May 3, 1949
- Built: 1949–1950
- Opened: December 2, 1950
- Renovated: 1990–1992
- Expanded: 1977–1979
- Cost: $1.33 million ($17.8 million in 2025 dollars)
- Architects: Fulton, Krinsky, and Dela Motte; Braun and Steidl (1992 renovation)

Tenants
- Kent State Golden Flashes (NCAA); Men's basketball 1950–present Women's basketball 1977–present Women's gymnastics 1964–present Women's volleyball 1978–present Wrestling 1950–present Men's gymnastics 1950–1994; Men's swimming 1950–1988; Women's swimming 1962–1988

The Memorial Athletic and Convocation Center, often referred to as the MAC Center and the MACC, is a multi-purpose arena on the campus of Kent State University in Kent, Ohio, United States. The building is primarily used as an athletic venue that is home to five Kent State Golden Flashes varsity athletic teams: men's basketball, women's basketball, women's volleyball, women's gymnastics, and wrestling. In addition, it hosts commencement exercises, speakers, and concerts throughout the year. The building houses the offices of the Kent State Athletic Department and the coaches of each of the university's varsity athletic teams.

The MAC Center opened in 1950 as the "Men's Physical Education Building" to replace Wills Gymnasium as the home of the men's basketball, wrestling, and men's swimming programs and men's physical education department. From 1956 to 1991, it was known as Memorial Gymnasium in honor of Kent State students who died in World War I and World War II. It was expanded in 1977 and underwent a major renovation between 1990 and 1992. Since 1992, the arena seating capacity has been listed at 6,327 in the basketball configuration. The MAC Center is a regular site for the Mid-American Conference championship meets for both wrestling and women's gymnastics and a past host of National Collegiate Athletic Association (NCAA) events. As of 2024, the building is the 21st-oldest arena in NCAA Division I college basketball and oldest in the Mid-American Conference.

== History ==
Plans for the MAC Center were drawn up in the late 1940s as Kent State saw a rapid enrollment increase in men following World War II. It was one of multiple construction projects at KSU during the post-war period, which included the first men's dormitory, Stopher Hall, in 1948, and a new practical arts building, later named Van Deusen Hall, in 1951. The state of Ohio approved funding in 1947 for the gym and work began in late April 1949 with an official groundbreaking on May 3, 1949. It was built on what was then the southern edge of campus on a hill overlooking Memorial Stadium, which was expanded with a new grandstand and press box dedicated in October 1950. The new Men's Physical Education Building was dedicated December 2, 1950, and hosted its first three athletic events that day as part of the dedication exercises. The wrestling team defeated Case Institute of Technology 21–8, followed by a 42–33 men's swimming victory over the Ohio Bobcats, and concluded with the men's basketball team claiming a 51–46 upset win over the Pittsburgh Panthers in front of approximately 4,000 fans. As of 2024 it is the 21st-oldest arena in U.S. college basketball. In its original configuration, building included the main gym and a pool, connected by a removable wall, as well as offices and other rooms to house the Physical Education department. The building replaced Wills Gymnasium, built in 1925, as the home of the Golden Flashes men's basketball, swimming, and wrestling teams. In 1956, the Men's Physical Education building was rededicated as Memorial Gym in honor of Kent State students who died in both world wars.

In 1977 construction began on the MACC Annex (originally known as the Memorial Gym Annex or MGA), which included a new facility for the gymnastics team that connects with the main gym by way of a removable wall. Most of the Annex addition, which opened in 1979, was built as a separate building behind the MAC Center which is connected by a second floor bridge. The Annex originally included a large central gym with four adjacent basketball courts as well as auxiliary gyms, courts, a weight room, classrooms, and offices for the School of Dance and the School of Exercise, Leisure, and Sport and would serve as the Kent State Recreation Center until 1999. For many years, up until 2016, the Annex housed graduate student studios from the KSU College of Architecture in space taken from two of the original four basketball courts. Since March 2016, the Athletic Training and Education Center, a 10,000-square-foot (930 m^{2}) sports medicine facility, is located in the Annex. It includes three therapy pools, a cryotherapy unit, training areas, and meeting rooms.

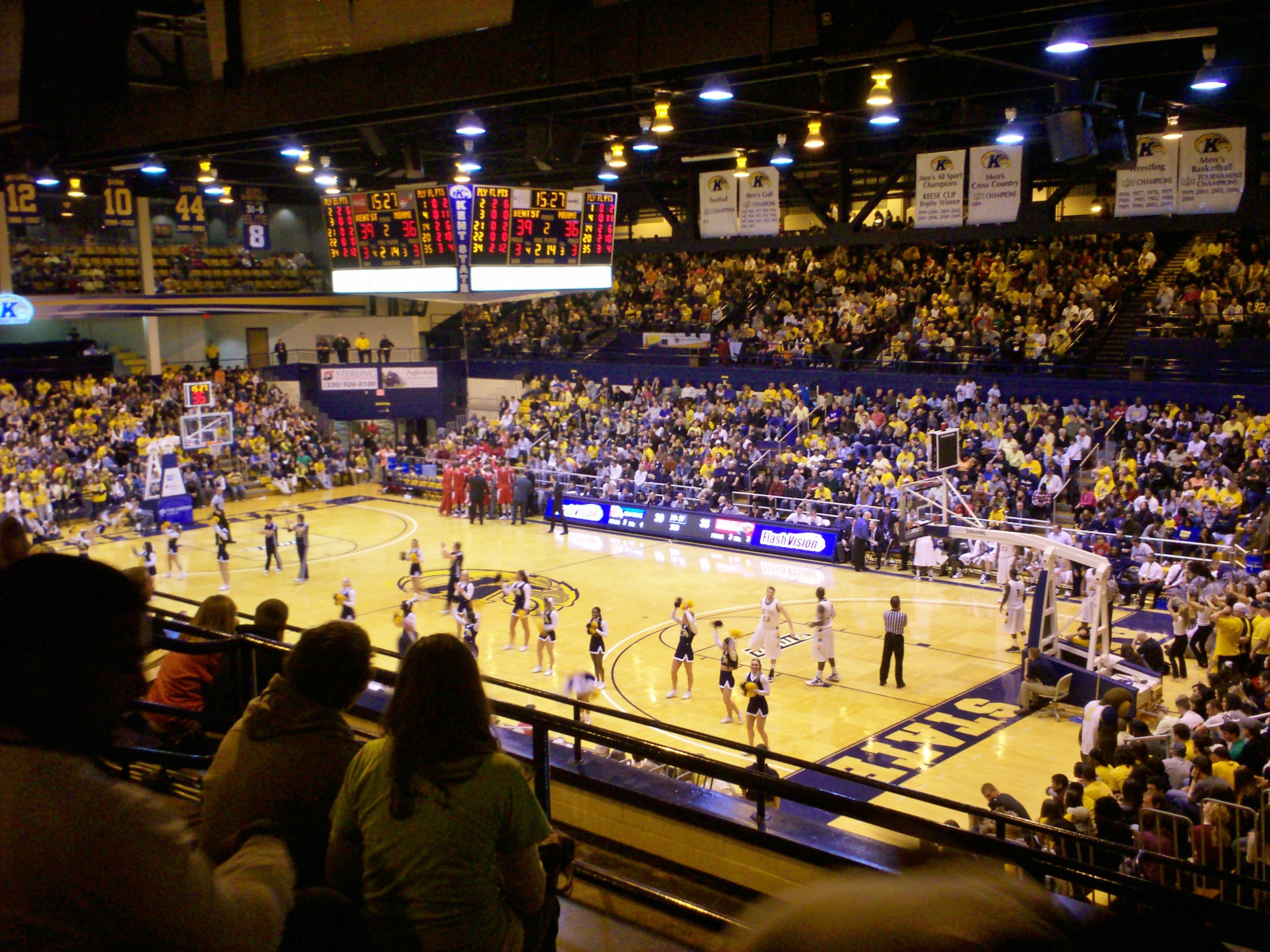
Interior view in 2010

The arena underwent a major renovation between 1990 and 1992. This renovation removed the swimming pool in the front of the building and replaced it with a new three-story entrance lobby, ticket office, and the Blue and Gold Club Loge on the third level. The renovation also included a new facade on the outside of the new lobby, a new scoreboard system, parquet floor, and improved lighting. The name of the facility was changed to Memorial Athletic and Convocation Center on November 20, 1991, as a result of a survey of students, alumni, faculty, and staff. In 2006, a new court was installed, along with a new scoreboard system.

Additional upgrades, such as a sideline LED display, were added in the late 2000s, and a new lighting system was installed in 2014. Larger renovations and remodeling have been discussed. In December 2006, KSU Athletic director Laing Kennedy discussed plans to renovate the lower level of seating to create a bowl and install chair-back seats for the entire level. With the new design, fans would enter all levels of seating from the second level instead of the current court-level entrances. Additional plans included renovating the Blue and Gold Club loge and dividing it into smaller private loges. No timetable was announced for the changes other than they would follow plans to upgrade Dix Stadium, which were completed in 2008. The athletic department announced updated plans for the MAC Center in 2013 as part of the larger "Building Champions" fundraising drive to upgrade facilities across the university. Plans for the arena include new chairback seating in both lower level sideline seating areas, a new practice court, four suites, remodeling the existing Blue and Gold loge, and other upgrades and changes to the arena, office, and lobby areas. Additionally, plans also call for practice areas for the wrestling, women's volleyball, and women's gymnastics teams to be built in available space in the adjacent MACC Annex. More specific plans were laid out in March 2016 as part of the athletic department's strategic vision, known as "The Game Plan". The first phase of updates was completed in August 2016 with the replacement of chairback seats in sections A–E.

== Athletics ==
Largest crowds
Attendance	Date	Opponent	Result
7,778	Jan 10, 1970	#5 St. Bonaventure	L 94–65
7,456	Dec 1, 1971	Purdue	L 82–75
7,345	Feb 1, 1969	Miami (Ohio)	L 47–45
7,248	Jan 6, 1971	Miami (Ohio)	L 61–59 OT
7,228	Jan 19, 1963	#2 Loyola (Chicago)	L 96–55
Largest crowds since 1992 renovation
6,567	Mar 4, 2007	Akron	L 66–64 OT
6,532	Feb 4, 2006	Akron	W 63–57
6,516	Jan 23, 2008	Akron	W 75–69
6,502	Feb 26, 2005	Akron	W 73–68
6,407	Jan 31, 2004	Akron	W 77–66

The MAC Center's most visible role is that of being the home court for five of the university's intercollegiate athletic teams: men's basketball, women's basketball, women's volleyball, women's gymnastics, and wrestling. The Kent State men's basketball team has played home games at the MAC Center since the building opened in 1950 and through the 2009–10 season has an all-time home record of 488–255 (.657). Since 1998, the team has a 149–23 (.866) record in the MAC Center. The largest crowd at the building was 7,778 for a game against St. Bonaventure on January 10, 1970. Since the 1992 renovation, the largest crowd to see a game in the MAC Center was 6,567 on March 4, 2007 against arch-rival Akron. The KSU women's basketball team has an all-time record of 306–101 (.752) which includes a 43-game winning streak that ran from December 3, 1997 to December 1, 2001. Since the 2000 season, the women's gymnastics team has a 60–10 record at the MAC Center. The northern end of the building is the gymnastics center and serves as the practice facility for the women's gymnastics team. It connects to the main arena by way of a removable wall. Prior to 2005, most home meets were held in the gymnastics center by reversing the direction of a section of baseline bleachers.

The arena has been the site of conference and NCAA events as well. During the 1960s, the MAC Center, then known as Memorial Gym, hosted the NCAA Wrestling Team Championship on two occasions. The 1963 tournament, won by the Oklahoma Sooners, was held over three days with a total attendance of over 16,000. The championship returned to Kent in 1967 and drew over 26,000 fans over three days, and was won by the Michigan State Spartans. The building has been a host arena for games in two NCAA Division I men's basketball tournaments. In the 1966 tournament, Memorial Gym was a host arena for two Mid-East regional quarterfinal games. The Dayton Flyers defeated the Miami Redskins 58–51 and the Western Kentucky Hilltoppers defeated the Loyola Ramblers 105–86. Two years later, Memorial Gym was again the site for two NCAA Mid-East regional quarterfinal games: the Marquette Golden Eagles narrowly beat the Bowling Green Falcons 72–71 and the East Tennessee State Buccaneers defeated the Florida State Seminoles 79–69 as part of the 1968 tournament. The MAC Center is also a regular site for Mid-American Conference events such as the women's gymnastics and men's wrestling championships. The inaugural Mid-American Conference Gymnastics Championships meet was held at the MAC Center in 1981 and the facility has hosted the meet six times through 2023.

== Convocation and other uses ==
The MAC Center houses administrative offices for the athletic department, coaches' offices for the various teams, the main ticket office, and hosts a variety of events including guest speakers, concerts, and graduations for both the university and local high schools. University commencement exercises are held three times a year in May, August, and December. Before the development of class registration by way of telephone and over the Internet, the MAC Center was the long-time site of class registration along with Wills Gymnasium.

Concerts are held regularly in the arena and for many years, the MAC Center was a prominent concert venue for the region due to its relatively large indoor seating capacity. Until the Richfield Coliseum opened in 1974, the only arenas with larger seating capacities in the region were the 12,000-seat Cleveland Arena and 10,000-seat Public Auditorium, both in downtown Cleveland. Some of the musical acts to perform at the MAC Center over the years include Duke Ellington in 1957, Paul Simon and Pink Floyd in 1973, Jethro Tull in 1975, Peter Gabriel in 1978, the Outlaws in 1976, Phish in 1994, Peter, Paul, and Mary in 1995, Crosby, Stills, Nash & Young in 1997, Smashing Pumpkins in 2000, Bob Dylan in 2002, Bruno Mars in 2011, Kendrick Lamar in 2013, and Wiz Khalifa in 2016.

The arena has also hosted speakers, comedians, and political figures. Comedian Bill Cosby performed two shows in 1969, and comedian Robin Williams came to the building in 1982. U.S. President Barack Obama became the first sitting president to visit Kent State University when he held a rally in the MAC Center as part of his re-election campaign in 2012. Democrat Hubert Humphrey also campaigned in the arena, holding a rally in 1968 as part of his presidential campaign. Other political figures to speak in the MAC Center include two former First Ladies, Eleanor Roosevelt in 1954 and Barbara Bush in 2000. Filmmaker Michael Moore spoke in the arena in 2004 in an event that included an appearance by actress/comedian Roseanne Barr. The event was part of Moore's Slacker Uprising Tour, which was later made into a documentary. Filmmaker Ken Burns spoke at the MAC Center in 2014 as part of the university's Presidential Speaker Series.

== Layout ==
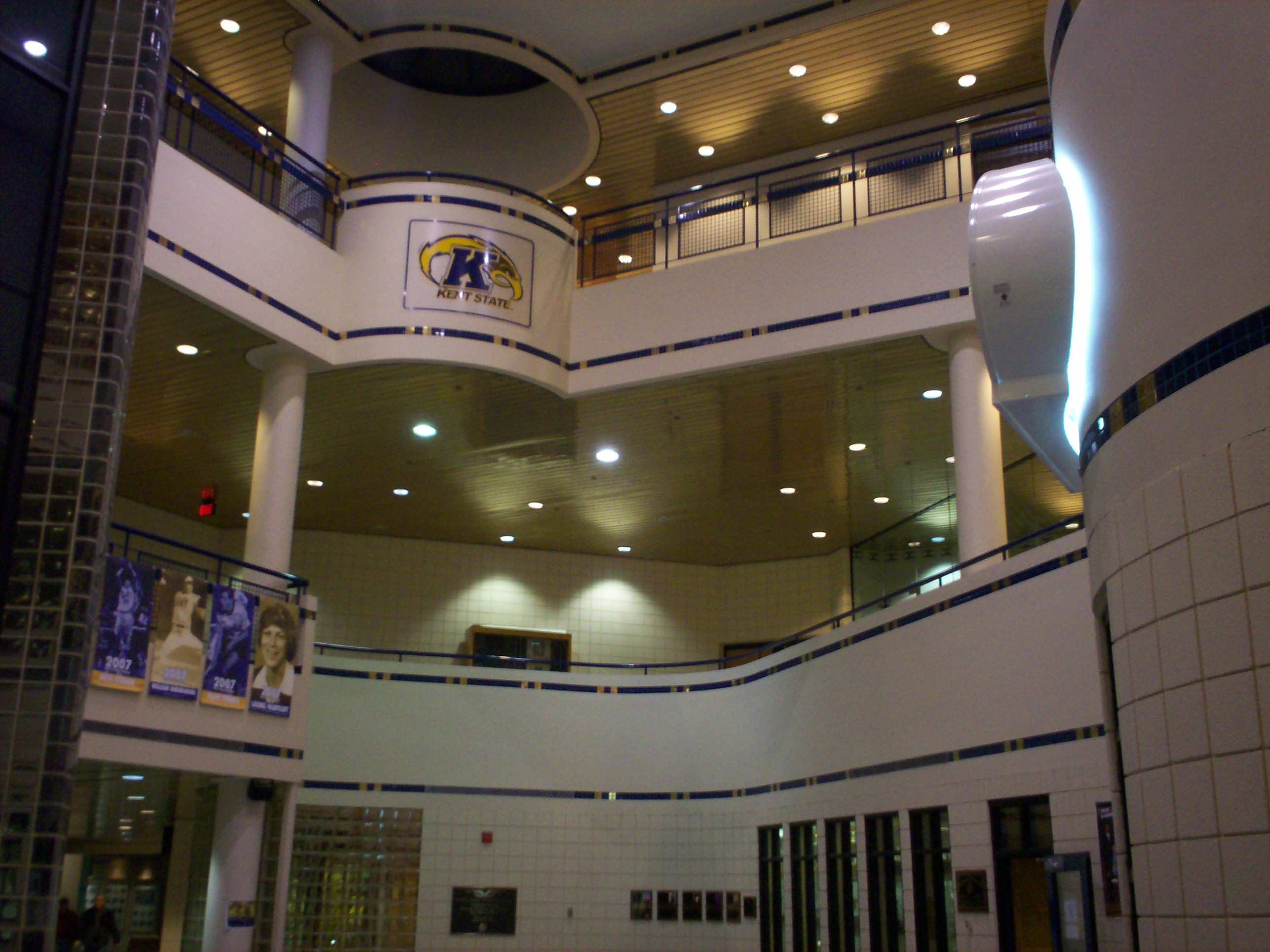
View of main lobby showing elevator and third floor

Built as a physical education building, the interior of the arena consists of seating areas on each side of the floor with balcony seating along each sideline. All seating sections are bleacher seats except for chairback seats in the lower sideline section opposite the team benches and in the Blue and Gold Loge.

On the first floor are located the main and auxiliary lobbies, restrooms, gymnastics training area, and athletic department offices. The Varsity K Hall of Fame is located outside the southern arena doors. There is also a display showing all the donors who have endowed scholarships to athletics. The main lobby is three stories high and was built as part of the 1992 renovations on what was originally the swimming pool. It includes an elevator, concession stands, the Steve Milkovich Family Ticket Office, team shop, the Laing and Saundra Kennedy Blue and Gold Trophy Room, and the Scolin MacLean Donor's Lounge (nick-named "The Scolly Bear Lair") which houses the offices of The Golden Flashes Club. The four auxiliary lobbies are located at each corner of the arena and provide access to restrooms, drinking fountains, and stairs to the balcony sections. Football office are located near Lobby A, Men's Basketball offices near Lobby B, Women's Basketball offices near Lobby C, and Volleyball offices are located near Lobby D.

The team locker rooms, additional coaches' offices, GFTV, Equipment Room, and storage are located on the second floor, underneath the balcony sections.

== See also ==
- List of NCAA Division I basketball arenas
