= Mid-American Conference Gymnastics Championships =

Mid-American Conference gymnastics championships
- Conference gymnastics championship
- Sport: Women's gymnastics
- Conference: Mid-American Conference
- Number of teams: 7
- Current location: Campus sites
- Played: 1981–present
- Last contest: 2026
- Current champion: Central Michigan
- Most championships: Central Michigan (20)
- Official website: mac-sports.com/tournaments/?id=63

Host locations
- Kent, Ohio; Bowling Green, Ohio; Muncie, Indiana; DeKalb, Illinois; Mount Pleasant, Michigan; Kalamazoo, Michigan; Ypsilanti, Michigan

The Mid-American Conference gymnastics championships is the conference championship meet for women's gymnastics in the Mid-American Conference, a Division I member of the National Collegiate Athletic Association (NCAA). All conference members qualify for the championship meet, which is held in three rounds. The tournament began in 1981 and is rotated between the home arenas of the seven conference members. Through the 2021 championship, Central Michigan has won the most championships with 20, followed by Kent State with 12.

== History and format ==
The championship was organized in 1981 after the Mid-American Conference added women's gymnastics as a sponsored sport. The NCAA began sponsoring women's gymnastics as a sport in 1981 and held the first championship tournament in 1982. Prior to 1981, most MAC member schools had women's gymnastics teams who competed in the Division for Girls' and Women's Sports (DGWS), which staged its first national championship in 1968. The DGWS later became the Association for Intercollegiate Athletics for Women (AIAW) in 1973. Teams also participated in regional and state-level championship meets, such as the Ohio Association of Intercollegiate Sports for Women and the Midwest Association of Intercollegiate Athletics for Women. Many of the programs were founded in the mid-1970s as a result of Title IX, though some programs originated earlier as clubs, such as Kent State in 1959.

The first MAC championship meet was hosted by Kent State University on March 21, 1981, in the Gymnastics Center at Memorial Gym and included the seven current members of the conference who sponsor women's gymnastics. Initially, eight conference members sponsored women's gymnastics, though Miami University was only able to participate in the 1982 championship meet and dropped the sport after the 1982–83 season. Northern Illinois University left the conference in 1986, reducing conference women's gymnastics membership to six teams, which stood until NIU returned to the conference for the 1997–98 season. The championship is rotated every year to the home arenas of the different member schools, so each school hosts every eighth year under the current format. At the meet, each team competes in four rotations: balance beam, uneven bars, vault, and floor exercise. In addition to the team champions, the conference recognizes an all-around winner and individual winners for each rotation. The team champion is awarded a regional berth in the NCAA Women's Gymnastics Championships.

=== By year ===
The following is a list of conference champions, individual all-around winners, and championship locations listed by year.

Year	Location	Team champion	All-around champion (school)
1981	Memorial Gymnasium • Kent, Ohio	Kent State	Sonya McGhee (Eastern Michigan)
1982	Anderson Arena • Bowling Green, Ohio	Bowling Green	Laurie Garee (Bowling Green)
1983	Irving Gymnasium • Muncie, Indiana	Bowling Green	Julie Bender (Bowling Green)
1984	Chick Evans Field House • DeKalb, Illinois	Kent State	Julie Bender (Bowling Green); Darlene Davis (Northern Illinois)
1985	Rose Arena • Mount Pleasant, Michigan	Bowling Green	Sharon McNie (Eastern Michigan)
1986	Read Fieldhouse • Kalamazoo, Michigan	Western Michigan	Sharon McNie (Eastern Michigan)
1987	Bowen Field House • Ypsilanti, Michigan	Western Michigan	Linda Moran (Western Michigan)
1988	Memorial Gymnasium • Kent, Ohio	Kent State	Dainty Hiser (Kent State)
1989	Anderson Arena • Bowling Green, Ohio	Kent State	Sue McCarthy (Western Michigan)
1990	Irving Gymnasium • Muncie, Indiana	Central Michigan	Michelle Owens (Ball State); Shelby Root (Central Michigan)
1991	Rose Arena • Mount Pleasant, Michigan	Central Michigan	Allyson Newman (Eastern Michigan)
1992	Read Fieldhouse • Kalamazoo, Michigan	Central Michigan	Allyson Newman (Eastern Michigan)
1993	Bowen Field House • Ypsilanti, Michigan	Central Michigan	Robin Loheide (Eastern Michigan)
1994	Memorial Athletic and Convocation Center • Kent, Ohio	Kent State	Michelle Naessig (Kent State)
1995	Worthen Arena • Muncie, Indiana	Central Michigan	Jenny Snell (Central Michigan)
1996	Anderson Arena • Bowling Green, Ohio	Kent State	Shelly Stambaugh (Kent State)
1997	Rose Arena • Mount Pleasant, Michigan	Kent State	Michelle Naessig (Kent State)
1998	Chick Evans Field House • DeKalb, Illinois	Central Michigan	Amber Gaskill (Central Michigan)
1999	University Arena • Kalamazoo, Michigan	Central Michigan	Marny Oestreng (Bowling Green)
2000	EMU Convocation Center • Ypsilanti, Michigan	Central Michigan	Marny Oestreng (Bowling Green)
2001	Memorial Athletic and Convocation Center • Kent, Ohio	Kent State	Sarah Dame (Central Michigan); Marny Oestreng (Bowling Green)
2002	Worthen Arena • Muncie, Indiana	Ball State	Kara Reighard (Central Michigan)
2003	Anderson Arena • Bowling Green, Ohio	Central Michigan	Kara Reighard (Central Michigan)
2004	Rose Arena • Mount Pleasant, Michigan	Central Michigan	Sarah Burtinsky (Central Michigan)
2005	NIU Convocation Center • DeKalb, Illinois	Kent State	Sarah Burtinsky (Central Michigan)
2006	University Arena • Kalamazoo, Michigan	Western Michigan	Jennifer Sturgis (Western Michigan)
2007	EMU Convocation Center • Ypsilanti, Michigan	Eastern Michigan	Jolene Worley (Eastern Michigan)
2008	Memorial Athletic and Convocation Center • Kent, Ohio	Kent State	Andrea de la Garza (Central Michigan)
2009	Worthen Arena • Muncie, Indiana	Kent State	Katie Simon (Central Michigan)
2010	Anderson Arena • Bowling Green, Ohio	Central Michigan	Katie Simon (Central Michigan)
2011	McGuirk Arena • Mount Pleasant, Michigan	Central Michigan	Kristin Teuber (Central Michigan)
2012	NIU Convocation Center • DeKalb, Illinois	Central Michigan	Bethany Petzold (Central Michigan)
2013	University Arena • Kalamazoo, Michigan	Central Michigan; Western Michigan	Marie Case (Kent State)
2014	EMU Convocation Center • Ypsilanti, Michigan	Central Michigan	Marie Case (Kent State)
2015	Memorial Athletic and Convocation Center • Kent, Ohio	Kent State	Anna Corbett (Western Michigan)
2016	Worthen Arena • Muncie, Indiana	Eastern Michigan	Lauren Feely (Bowling Green)
2017	Stroh Center • Bowling Green, Ohio	Eastern Michigan	Rachel Stypinski (Kent State)
2018	McGuirk Arena • Mount Pleasant, Michigan	Central Michigan	Gianna Plaska (Central Michigan)
2019	NIU Convocation Center • DeKalb, Illinois	Northern Illinois	Denelle Pedrick (Central Michigan)
2020	University Arena • Kalamazoo, Michigan	Cancelled due to the coronavirus pandemic	
2021	University Arena • Kalamazoo, Michigan	Eastern Michigan	Sarah Moravansky (Western Michigan)
2022	George Gervin GameAbove Center • Ypsilanti, Mich	Central Michigan	Hannah DeMers (Central Michigan)
2023	Memorial Gymnasium • Kent, Ohio	Central Michigan	Hannah DeMers (Central Michigan)
2024	Worthen Arena • Muncie, Indiana	Western Michigan	Zoe Middleton (Ball State)
2025	Worthen Arena • Muncie, Indiana	Central Michigan	Hannah Appleget (Central Michigan)
2026	Anderson Arena • Bowling Green, Ohio	Central Michigan	Luciana Alvarado-Reid (Central Michigan)

=== By school ===
The following table lists all teams that have been part of the championship, the years they have participated, and the years the respective program has won the team championship.

Program	Tenure	Titles	Years won
Central Michigan	1981–present	20	1990, 1991, 1992, 1993, 1995, 1998, 1999, 2000, 2003, 2004, 2010, 2011, 2012, 2013^{†}, 2014, 2018, 2022, 2023, 2025, 2026
Kent State	1981–present	12	1981, 1984, 1988, 1989, 1994, 1996, 1997, 2001, 2005, 2008, 2009, 2015
Western Michigan	1981–present	5	1986, 1987, 2006, 2013^{†}, 2024
Eastern Michigan	1981–present	4	2007, 2016, 2017, 2021
Bowling Green	1981–present	3	1982, 1983, 1985
Ball State	1981–present	1	2002
Northern Illinois	1981–1986; 1998–present	1	2019
Miami	1982	0	

†=co-champions
Former conference members shaded in ██ silver
