= 1988 North Star Conference women's volleyball tournament =

1988 North Star Conference women's basketball tournament
- Classification: Division I
- Teams: 8
- Site: DeKalb, Illinois
- Champions: Northern Illinois
- Winning coach: Pete Waite (1 title)
- North Star Conference women's basketball tournaments

The 1988 North Star Conference Women's Volleyball Tournament was held at the ? in DeKalb, Illinois. The tournament began on November 19, 1988, and ended on November 20, 1988.

== North Star Conference standings ==
#	Team	Conference	Pct.	Overall	Pct.
1	Northern Illinois	6–1	.857	22–8	.733
2	Akron	5–2	.714	30–18	.625
3	DePaul	4–3	.571	15–21	.417
4	Marquette	?–?	.???	??–??	.???
5	Illinois-Chicago	?–?	.???	??–??	.???
6	Valparaiso	?–?	.???	??–??	.???
7	Cleveland State	2–5	.286	20–22	.476
8	Green Bay	0–7	.000	6–20	.231

== 1988 North Star Conference Tournament ==
- November 19, 1988 Valparaiso 3, Cleveland State 1
- November 19, 1988 Cleveland State 3, DePaul 2
- November 19, 1988 Northern Illinois 3, Cleveland State 0
- November 19, 1988 Northern Illinois 3, DePaul 1
- November 19, 1988 Green Bay 3, Marquette 1
- November 19, 1988 Akron 3, Green Bay 2
- November 19, 1988 Illinois Chicago 3, Green Bay 0
- November 19, 1988 Valparaiso 3, DePaul 1
- November 19, 1988 Illinois Chicago 3, Akron 1
- November 19, 1988 Akron 2, Marquette 0
- November 19, 1988 Northern Illinois 3, Valparaiso 0
- November 20, 1988 Northern Illinois 3, Akron 0
- November 20, 1988 Valparaiso 2, Akron 0
- November 20, 1988 Northern Illinois 3, Illinois Chicago 0
