= 2022 ACC women's soccer tournament =

Soccer tournament

- Classification: Division I
- Teams: 6
- Matches: 5
- Attendance: 7,684
- Quarterfinals site: Campus Sites
- Semifinals site: WakeMed Soccer Park; Cary, North Carolina
- Finals site: WakeMed Soccer Park; Cary, North Carolina
- Champions: Florida State (9th title)
- Winning coach: Brian Pensky (1st title)
- MVP: Jenna Nighswonger (Florida State)
- Broadcast: ACCN (Quarterfinals & Semifinals), ESPNU (Final)

2022 ACC women's soccer standings
	Conf.						Overall
Team	W		L		T	PCT	W		L		T	PCT
No. 2 North Carolina ‍†‍‍^{y}	8	–	2	–	0	.800	20	–	5	–	1	.788
No. 3 Florida State ‍†‍‡‍^{y}	8	–	2	–	0	.800	17	–	3	–	3	.804
No. 5 Notre Dame ‍‍‍^{y}	7	–	2	–	1	.750	17	–	3	–	3	.804
No. 7 Virginia ‍‍‍^{y}	6	–	2	–	2	.700	16	–	4	–	3	.761
No. 6 Duke ‍‍‍^{y}	6	–	2	–	2	.700	15	–	5	–	3	.717
No. 12 Pittsburgh ‍‍‍^{y}	5	–	3	–	2	.600	14	–	5	–	3	.705
Clemson ‍‍‍^{y}	4	–	3	–	3	.550	8	–	5	–	5	.583
Virginia Tech ‍‍‍^{y}	4	–	5	–	1	.450	10	–	7	–	2	.579
Wake Forest ‍‍‍^{y}	3	–	6	–	1	.350	9	–	7	–	3	.553
Louisville ‍‍‍	3	–	7	–	0	.300	6	–	8	–	2	.438
NC State ‍‍‍^{y}	2	–	6	–	2	.300	7	–	7	–	6	.500
Miami (FL) ‍‍‍	2	–	7	–	1	.250	5	–	8	–	3	.406
Syracuse ‍‍‍	1	–	6	–	3	.250	8	–	7	–	3	.528
Boston College ‍‍‍	1	–	7	–	2	.200	5	–	8	–	5	.417
† – Conference champion ‡ – 2022 ACC Tournament champion y – Invited to the NCAA Tournament; Source: The ACC; As of December 6, 2022; Rankings from United Soccer Coaches Poll

The 2022 Atlantic Coast Conference women's soccer tournament was the 35th edition of the ACC Women's Soccer Tournament, which decided the Atlantic Coast Conference champion. Florida State was the defending champion.

The first round was played at campus sites, while the semifinals and final were played at WakeMed Soccer Park in Cary, NC.

Florida State successfully defended their title, defeating Notre Dame in the Semifinals and North Carolina in the final, 2–1. This was the ninth title for Florida State as a program, and the first for head coach Brian Pensky. Florida State has won the past three ACC tournaments.

== Qualification ==
The top six teams in the Atlantic Coast Conference earned a berth into the ACC Tournament. The top two teams earned a bye to the semifinals. The final seedings were determined after the final day of the regular season on October 27, 2022. Multiple tiebreakers were required as teams finished with the same conference records. North Carolina and Florida State both finished with 8–2–0 conference records and tied for first place in the regular season. North Carolina defeated Florida State on October 20, during the regular season, and therefore earned the top seed in the tournament, while Florida State was the second seed. A second tiebreaker was required between Virginia and Duke as both teams finished 6–2–2 in conference play. Virginia defeated Duke on October 2, during the regular season, and earned the fourth seed, while Duke was the fifth seed.

Seed	School	Conference Record	Points
1	North Carolina	8–2–0	24
2	Florida State	8–2–0	24
3	Notre Dame	7–2–1	22
4	Virginia	6–2–2	20
5	Duke	6–2–2	20
6	Pittsburgh	5–3–2	17

== Bracket ==
First Round; October 30; ACCN
4	Virginia	1
5	Duke	2
3	Notre Dame (pen.)	1 (5)
6	Pittsburgh	1 (4)

Semifinal; November 3 ACCN
1	North Carolina (pen.)	0 (7)
5	Duke	0 (6)
2	Florida State (pen.)	3 (4)
3	Notre Dame	3 (2)

Championship; November 6 ESPNU
1	North Carolina	1
2	Florida State	2

== Schedule ==
=== First round ===
October 30, 2022	#3 Notre Dame	1–1 (a.e.t.) (5–4 p)	#6 Pittsburgh	Notre Dame, Indiana
6:00 p.m. EDT	Kiki van Zanten 57'	Report	70' Katie Zailski; (yellow card) 73' Landy Mertz	Stadium: Alumni Stadium; Attendance: 428; Referee: John McCloskey; Assistant referees: Erin Patterson; Peter Charpentier; Fourth official: Joshua Overmyer
	Penalties
	Maddie Mercado (penalty scored); Korbin Albert (penalty scored); Kiki Van Zanten (penalty scored); Waniya Hudson (penalty scored); Brianna Martinez (penalty scored)		(penalty scored) Sarah Schupansky; (penalty missed) Katie Zailski; (penalty scored) Ellie Coffield; (penalty scored) Keera Melenhorst; (penalty scored) Ashton Gordon

October 30, 2022	#4 Virginia	1–2	#5 Duke	Charlottesville, Virginia
8:00 p.m. EDT	Alexa Spaanstra 36'	Report	3' Michelle Cooper; 55' Kat Rader; (yellow card) 68' Maggie Graham	Stadium: Klöckner Stadium; Attendance: 691; Referee: Carmen Serbio; Assistant referees: William Aten; Matthew Richardson; Fourth official: Otto Leon

=== Semifinals ===
November 3, 2022	#1 North Carolina	0–0 (a.e.t.) (7–6 p)	#5 Duke	Cary, North Carolina
5:30 p.m. EDT	Talia DellaPeruta (yellow card) 45' (yellow-red card) 73'; Emily Moxley (yellow card) 110'	Report	(red card) 45' Maggie Graham	Stadium: WakeMed Soccer Park; Attendance: 691
	Penalties
	Tori Hansen (penalty scored); Rachel Jones (penalty scored); Ally Sentnor (penalty scored); Avery Patterson (penalty scored); Bella Sember (penalty missed); Tessa Dellarose (penalty scored); Ruby Grant (penalty scored); Emily Moxley (penalty scored)		(penalty missed) Katie Groff; (penalty scored) Emmy Duerr; (penalty scored) Kat Rader; (penalty scored) Devin Lynch; (penalty scored) Michelle Cooper; (penalty scored) Elle Piper; (penalty scored) Sophie Jones; (penalty missed) Mackenzie Pluck

November 3, 2022	#2 Florida State	3–3 (a.e.t.) (4–2 p)	#3 Notre Dame	Cary, North Carolina
8:00 p.m. EDT	Clara Robbins 13'; Heather Payne 32' (pen.); Emma Bissell 73'	Report	32', 57', 57' Korbin Albert	Stadium: WakeMed Soccer Park; Attendance: 2,686
	Penalties
	Clara Robbins (penalty missed); LeiLanni Nesbeth (penalty scored); Heather Payne (penalty scored); Ran Iwai (penalty scored); Jenna Nighswonger (penalty scored)		(penalty missed) Maddie Mercado; (penalty scored) Korbin Albert; (penalty scored) Kiki Van Zanten; (penalty missed) Waniya Hudson

=== Final ===
November 6, 2022	#1 North Carolina	1–2	#2 Florida State	Cary, North Carolina
12:00 p.m. EST	Avery Patterson 23'	Report	31' Jenna Nighswonger; 49', (yellow card) 88' Jody Brown; (yellow card) 64' Heather Payne; (yellow card) 89' Cristina Roque	Stadium: WakeMed Soccer Park; Attendance: 3,879; Referee: Nicole Green; Assistant referees: Erika Barahona; Mandy Love; Fourth official: Emma Richards

== Statistics ==
=== Goalscorers ===
There were 14 goals scored in 5 matches, for an average of 2.8 goals per match.

3 goals

- (United States) Korbin Albert – Notre Dame

1 goal

- (United States) Michelle Cooper – Duke
- (United States) Kat Rader – Duke
- (England) Emma Bissell – Florida State
- (Jamaica) Jody Brown – Florida State
- (United States) Jenna Nighswonger – Florida State
- (Republic of Ireland) Heather Payne – Florida State
- (United States) Clara Robbins – Florida State
- (United States) Avery Patterson – North Carolina
- (Jamaica) Kiki Van Zanten – Notre Dame
- (United States) Katie Zaliski – Pittsburgh
- (United States) Alexa Spaanstra – Virginia

== All-Tournament team ==
Player	Team
**Jenna Nighswonger**	Florida State
Jody Brown	Florida State
Onyi Echegini	Florida State
Beata Olsson	Florida State
Emily Moxley	North Carolina
Avery Patterson	North Carolina
Tori Hansen	North Carolina
Ruthie Jones	Duke
Michelle Cooper	Duke
Kat Rader	Duke
Korbin Albert	Notre Dame

MVP in bold
