= 2022 Notre Dame Fighting Irish women's soccer team =

American college soccer season

2022 Notre Dame Fighting Irish women's soccer

NCAA Tournament, Quarterfinals
- Conference: Atlantic Coast Conference
- U. Soc. Coaches poll: No. 5
- TopDrawerSoccer.com: No. 5
- Record: 17–3–3 (7–2–1 ACC)
- Head coach: Nate Norman (5th season)
- Assistant coaches: Dawn Siergiej (20th season); Jason Hamilton (2nd season)
- Home stadium: Alumni Stadium

2022 ACC women's soccer standings
	Conf.						Overall
Team	W		L		T	PCT	W		L		T	PCT
No. 2 North Carolina ‍†‍‍^{y}	8	–	2	–	0	.800	20	–	5	–	1	.788
No. 3 Florida State ‍†‍‡‍^{y}	8	–	2	–	0	.800	17	–	3	–	3	.804
No. 5 Notre Dame ‍‍‍^{y}	7	–	2	–	1	.750	17	–	3	–	3	.804
No. 7 Virginia ‍‍‍^{y}	6	–	2	–	2	.700	16	–	4	–	3	.761
No. 6 Duke ‍‍‍^{y}	6	–	2	–	2	.700	15	–	5	–	3	.717
No. 12 Pittsburgh ‍‍‍^{y}	5	–	3	–	2	.600	14	–	5	–	3	.705
Clemson ‍‍‍^{y}	4	–	3	–	3	.550	8	–	5	–	5	.583
Virginia Tech ‍‍‍^{y}	4	–	5	–	1	.450	10	–	7	–	2	.579
Wake Forest ‍‍‍^{y}	3	–	6	–	1	.350	9	–	7	–	3	.553
Louisville ‍‍‍	3	–	7	–	0	.300	6	–	8	–	2	.438
NC State ‍‍‍^{y}	2	–	6	–	2	.300	7	–	7	–	6	.500
Miami (FL) ‍‍‍	2	–	7	–	1	.250	5	–	8	–	3	.406
Syracuse ‍‍‍	1	–	6	–	3	.250	8	–	7	–	3	.528
Boston College ‍‍‍	1	–	7	–	2	.200	5	–	8	–	5	.417
† – Conference champion ‡ – 2022 ACC Tournament champion y – Invited to the NCAA Tournament; Source: The ACC; As of December 6, 2022; Rankings from United Soccer Coaches Poll

The 2022 Notre Dame Fighting Irish women's soccer team represented the University of Notre Dame during the 2022 NCAA Division I women's soccer season. It was the 35th season of the university fielding a program. The Fighting Irish were led by 5th year head coach Nate Norman and play their games at Alumni Stadium.

They finished 17–3–3 overall and 7–2–1 in ACC play to finish in third place. As the third seed in the ACC Tournament, they tied Pittsburgh in the First around and advanced via penalty shoot-out 5–4. In the Semifinal, Notre Dame played Florida State to a draw, but lost the penalty shoot-out to the eventual champions. They received an at-large bid to the NCAA Tournament, where they were the first-seed in the Notre Dame Bracket. They defeated Omaha in the First Round, eight-seed Santa Clara in the Second Round, and five-seed TCU in the Round of 16. However, they fell 2–0 to ACC foe North Carolina in the Quarterfinals to end their season. Their Quarterfinal performance was their best finish since 2010, when they won the NCAA title.

== Previous season ==
The Fighting Irish finished the season 14–6–2, 7–3–0 in ACC play to finish in fourth place. As the fourth seed in the ACC Tournament, they lost to fifth seed Clemson in the First Round. They received an at-large bid to the NCAA Tournament where they defeated SIU Edwardsville in the First Round, and Purdue on penalties in the Second Round, before losing to Arkansas in the Round of 16 to end their season.

== Offseason ==
=== Departures ===
Departures
Name	Number	Pos.	Height	Year	Hometown	Reason for departure
Mattie Interian	0	GK	5'10"	Senior	Pasadena, California	Graduated
Sammi Fisher	4	MF	5'6"	Graduate Student	Simi Valley, California	Graduated, drafted 19th overall in the 2022 NWSL Draft
Broke VanDyck	6	MF	5'2"	Senior	South Bend, Indiana	Graduated
Camryn Dyke	12	MF	5'7"	Graduate Student	Littleton, Colorado	Graduated
Nikki Colantuono	13	MF	5'3"	Senior	Otisville, New York	Graduated
Hulda Ósk Jónsdóttir	18	FW	5'7"	Graduate Student	Akureyri, Iceland	Graduated
Erin Ospeck	21	FW	5'4"	Graduate Student	Danville, California	Graduated
Gabrielle Daly	30	MF	5'5"	Senior	Ponte Vedra Beach, Florida	Graduated
Mary Votava	32	GK	5'8"	Sophomore	Tigard, Oregon	N/A

=== Incoming transfers ===
Incoming transfers
Name	Number	Pos.	Height	Year	Hometown	Previous school
Mackenzie Wood	1	GK	5'9"	Graduate Student	Granger, Indiana	Northwestern
Anna Rico	6	FW	5'5"	Graduate Student	Bainbridge, Ohio	Pittsburgh
Ashley Zugay	21	DF	5'7"	Graduate Student	Ann Arbor, Michigan	Nebraska
Kristina Lynch	34	FW/MF	5'7"	Graduate Student	Granger, Indiana	Florida State

=== Recruiting class ===
Name	Nationality	Hometown	Club	TDS Rating
Leah Klenke; DF	(United States)	Houston, Texas	Albion Hurricanes FC	4/5 stars
Delaney Matriano; MF	(United States)	Willoughby, Ohio	Cleveland FC	4/5 stars
Berkley Mensik; MF	(United States)	Algonquin, Illinois	Eclipse Select	3/5 stars
Kiki Turner; DF	(United States)	Scottsdale, Arizona	Phoenix Rising FC	2/5 stars

== Squad ==
=== Roster ===
As of December 27, 2022

Note: Flags indicate national team as defined under FIFA eligibility rules; some limited exceptions apply. Players may hold more than one non-FIFA nationality.

No.	Pos.	Nation	Player
1	GK	USA	Mackenzie Wood
2	MF	USA	Korbin Albert
3	MF	USA	Maddie Mercado
4	DF	USA	Leah Klenke
5	FW	USA	Ellie Ospeck
6	FW	USA	Anna Rico
7	FW	JAM	Kiki Van Zanten
8	DF	USA	Kaylie Ronan
9	FW	USA	Olivia Wingate
10	MF	USA	Erin Hohnstein
11	MF	USA	Sophia Fisher
12	MF	USA	Kiki Turner
13	MF	USA	Laney Matriano
14	DF	USA	Aba Dunbar
15	FW	USA	Kati Druzina
16	MF	USA	Brianna Martinez

No.	Pos.	Nation	Player
17	FW	USA	Audrey Weiss
18	MF	USA	Berkley Mensik
19	MF	USA	Eva Gaetino
20	DF	USA	Maddie Mooney
21	DF	USA	Ashley Zugay
22	DF	USA	Katie Coyle
23	MF	USA	Aly Akers
24	FW	USA	Paige Peltier
25	DF	USA	Waniya Hudson
26	DF	USA	Julia Ware
27	DF	USA	Caroline Gray
28	DF	USA	Eva Wirtz
29	MF	USA	Sophia Prudholme
31	GK	USA	Ashley Naylor
33	GK	USA	Kaylin Slattery
34	FW	USA	Kristina Lynch

== Team management ==
Position	Staff
Head coach	Nate Norman
Assistant Coach	Dawn Siergiej
Assistant Coach	Jason Hamilton
Director of Operations	Brendan Roth

== Schedule ==
Date Time, TV	Rank^{#}	Opponent^{#}	Result	Record	Site City, State
Exhibition
August 9*; 6:00 p.m.	No. 16	No. 11 Tennessee	L 0–3	–	Regal Stadium; Knoxville, TN
August 13*; 6:00 p.m.	No. 16	Ball State	–	–	Alumni Stadium; Notre Dame, IN
Non-conference regular season
August 18*; 7:00 p.m., ACCNX	No. 16	Marquette	W 3–0	1–0–0	Alumni Stadium (377); Notre Dame, IN
August 21*; 1:00 p.m., ACCNX	No. 16	Western Michigan	W 2–0	2–0–0	Alumni Stadium (1,655); Notre Dame, IN
August 25*; 7:00 p.m., ESPN+		at No. 19 Saint Louis	W 2–0	3–0–0	Hermann Stadium (4,273); St. Louis, MO
August 28*; 4:00 p.m., ACCNX		Illinois	W 4–0	4–0–0	Alumni Stadium (513); Notre Dame, IN
September 1*; 7:00 p.m., ACCNX	No. 16	No. 22 Wisconsin	W 4–1	5–0–0	Alumni Stadium (381); Notre Dame, IN
September 4*; 1:00 p.m., BTN+	No. 16	at Indiana	Canceled		Bill Armstrong Stadium; Bloomington, IN
September 8*; 7:00 p.m., BTN+	No. 12	at Purdue	W 3–1	6–0–0	Folk Field (541); West Lafayette, IN
September 11*; 1:00 p.m., ACCNX	No. 12	Ohio	W 3–1	7–0–0	Alumni Stadium (224); Notre Dame, IN
ACC regular season
September 15; 8:00 p.m., ACCN	No. 6	at Clemson	L 0–2	7–1–0 (0–1–0)	Riggs Field (972); Clemson, SC
September 22; 7:00 p.m., ACCNX	No. 18	No. 2 Virginia	W 1–0	8–1–0 (1–1–0)	Alumni Stadium (718); Notre Dame, IN
September 25; 1:00 p.m., ACCNX	No. 18	Pittsburgh	L 1–3	8–2–0 (1–2–0)	Alumni Stadium (395); Notre Dame, IN
September 29; 6:00 p.m., ACCN	No. 16	at Boston College	W 3–0	9–2–0 (2–2–0)	Newton Campus Soccer Field (441); Chestnut Hill, MA
October 6; 7:00 p.m., ACCNX	No. 17	NC State	W 3–0	10–2–0 (3–2–0)	Alumni Stadium (321); Notre Dame, IN
October 9; 12:00 p.m., ESPNU	No. 17	No. 3 Florida State	W 4–0	11–2–0 (4–2–0)	Alumni Stadium (544); Notre Dame, IN
October 15; 7:00 p.m., ACCNX	No. 6	at Louisville	W 2–0	12–2–0 (5–2–0)	Lynn Stadium (413); Louisville, KY
October 20; 7:00 p.m., ACCNX	No. 5	at Virginia Tech	W 1–0	13–2–0 (6–2–0)	Thompson Field (478); Blacksburg, VA
October 23; 5:00 p.m., ACCNX	No. 5	at Wake Forest	W 3–0	14–2–0 (7–2–0)	Spry Stadium (803); Winston-Salem, NC
October 27; 8:00 p.m., ACCN	No. 4	No. 11 Duke	T 2–2	14–2–1 (7–2–1)	Alumni Stadium (817); Notre Dame, IN
ACC tournament
October 30; 6:00 p.m., ACCN	(3) No. 4	(6) No. 19 Pittsburgh; First Round	T 1–1 (5–4 PKs) ^{2OT}	14–2–2	Alumni Stadium (428); Notre Dame, IN
November 3; 8:00 p.m., ACCN	(3) No. 4	vs. (2) No. 5 Florida State; Semifinal	T 3–3 (2–4 PKs)	14–2–3	Sahlen's Stadium (2,686); Cary, NC
NCAAA Tournament
November 12; 2:00 p.m., ESPN+	(1) No. 4	Omaha; First Round	W 5–0	15–2–3	Alumni Stadium (376); Notre Dame, IN
November 18; 6:00 p.m., ESPN+	(1) No. 4	(8) No. 23 Santa Clara; Second Round	W 4–0	16–2–3	Alumni Stadium (442); Notre Dame, IN
November 20; 6:30 p.m., ESPN+	(1) No. 4	(5) No. 17 TCU; Round of 16	W 2–0	17–2–3	Alumni Stadium (478); Notre Dame, IN
November 26; 6:00 p.m., ESPN+	(1) No. 4	(2) No. 2 North Carolina; Quarterfinals	L 0–2	17–3–3	Alumni Stadium (1,828); Notre Dame, IN
*Non-conference game. ^{#}Rankings from United Soccer Coaches. (#) Tournament seedings in parentheses. All times are in Eastern.

== Awards and honors ==
Recipient	Award	Date	Ref.
Korbin Albert	Pre-season All-ACC Team	August 11	
Eva Gaetino	Hermann Trophy Preseason Watchlist	August 18	
Leah Klenke	ACC Defensive Player of the Week	August 30	
Olivia Wingate	ACC Offensive Player of the Week	September 6	
Kiki Van Zanten	ACC Offensive Player of the Week	September 13	
Olivia Wingate	ACC Offensive Player of the Week	October 11	
Mackenzie Wood	ACC Co-Defensive Player of the Week	October 11	
Korbin Albert	ACC Co-Offensive Player of the Week	October 25	
Mackenzie Wood	ACC Defensive Player of the Week	October 25	
Korbin Albert	ACC Co-Offensive Player of the Week	November 1	
Nate Norman	ACC Coach of the Year	November 2	
Korbin Albert	ACC Midfielder of the Year	November 2	
Eva Gaetino	ACC Defensive Player of the Year	November 2	
Olivia Wingate	All-ACC First Team	November 2	
Korbin Albert	All-ACC First Team	November 2	
Eva Gaetino	All-ACC First Team	November 2	
Maddie Mercado	All-ACC Third Team	November 2	
Mackenzie Wood	All-ACC Third Team	November 2	
Leah Klenke	ACC All-Freshman Team	November 2	
Korbin Albert	All-ACC Tournament team	November 6	
Eva Gaetino	All-American	December 2	
Korbin Albert	All-American	December 2	

== Rankings ==
Ranking movements Legend: ██ Increase in ranking ██ Decrease in ranking RV = Received votes
	Week																
Poll	Pre	1	2	3	4	5	6	7	8	9	10	11	12	13	14	15	Final
United Soccer	16	RV	16	12	6	18	16	17	6	5	4	4	Not released				5
TopDrawer Soccer	16	15	10	9	8	16	18	15	13	8	6	5	5	5	5	5	5

== 2023 NWSL Draft ==
Player	Team	Round	Pick #	Position
Olivia Wingate	North Carolina Courage	1	6	FW
Brianna Martinez	Racing Louisville FC	2	17	DF
