= 2022 Louisville Cardinals women's soccer team =

2022 Louisville Cardinals women's soccer
- Conference: Atlantic Coast Conference
- Record: 6–8–2 (3–7–0 ACC)
- Head coach: Karen Ferguson-Dayes (23rd season)
- Assistant coaches: Hunter Norton (7th season); Nick Stirrett (2nd season)
- Home stadium: Lynn Stadium

2022 ACC women's soccer standings
| | Conf. | | | | | | Overall |
| Team | W | | L | | T | PCT | W | | L | | T | PCT |
|---|---|---|---|---|---|---|---|---|---|---|---|---|
| No. 2 North Carolina ‍†‍‍^{y} | 8 | – | 2 | – | 0 | .800 | 20 | – | 5 | – | 1 | .788 |
| No. 3 Florida State ‍†‍‡‍^{y} | 8 | – | 2 | – | 0 | .800 | 17 | – | 3 | – | 3 | .804 |
| No. 5 Notre Dame ‍‍‍^{y} | 7 | – | 2 | – | 1 | .750 | 17 | – | 3 | – | 3 | .804 |
| No. 7 Virginia ‍‍‍^{y} | 6 | – | 2 | – | 2 | .700 | 16 | – | 4 | – | 3 | .761 |
| No. 6 Duke ‍‍‍^{y} | 6 | – | 2 | – | 2 | .700 | 15 | – | 5 | – | 3 | .717 |
| No. 12 Pittsburgh ‍‍‍^{y} | 5 | – | 3 | – | 2 | .600 | 14 | – | 5 | – | 3 | .705 |
| Clemson ‍‍‍^{y} | 4 | – | 3 | – | 3 | .550 | 8 | – | 5 | – | 5 | .583 |
| Virginia Tech ‍‍‍^{y} | 4 | – | 5 | – | 1 | .450 | 10 | – | 7 | – | 2 | .579 |
| Wake Forest ‍‍‍^{y} | 3 | – | 6 | – | 1 | .350 | 9 | – | 7 | – | 3 | .553 |
| Louisville ‍‍‍ | 3 | – | 7 | – | 0 | .300 | 6 | – | 8 | – | 2 | .438 |
| NC State ‍‍‍^{y} | 2 | – | 6 | – | 2 | .300 | 7 | – | 7 | – | 6 | .500 |
| Miami (FL) ‍‍‍ | 2 | – | 7 | – | 1 | .250 | 5 | – | 8 | – | 3 | .406 |
| Syracuse ‍‍‍ | 1 | – | 6 | – | 3 | .250 | 8 | – | 7 | – | 3 | .528 |
| Boston College ‍‍‍ | 1 | – | 7 | – | 2 | .200 | 5 | – | 8 | – | 5 | .417 |
† – Conference champion ‡ – 2022 ACC Tournament champion y – Invited to the NCAA Tournament; Source: The ACC; As of December 6, 2022; Rankings from United Soccer Coaches Poll

The 2022 Louisville Cardinals women's soccer team represented University of Louisville during the 2022 NCAA Division I women's soccer season. The Cardinals were led by head coach Karen Ferguson-Dayes, in her twenty-third season. They played home games at Lynn Stadium. This was the team's 38th season playing organized women's college soccer and their 9th playing in the Atlantic Coast Conference.

The Cardinals finished the season 6–8–2 overall and 3–7–0 in ACC play to finish in tenth place. The team did not qualify for the ACC Tournament and were not invited to the NCAA Tournament.

== Previous season ==
The Cardinals finished the season 7–7–2 overall and 3–6–1 in ACC play to finish in eleventh place. The team did not qualify for the ACC Tournament and were not invited to the NCAA Tournament.

== Offseason ==
=== Departures ===
Departures
| Name | Number | Pos. | Height | Year | Hometown | Reason for departure |
|---|---|---|---|---|---|---|
| Gabby Kouzelos | 1 | GK | 5'7" | Graduate Student | Wadsworth, Ohio | Graduated |
| Abigail Baldridge | 7 | DF | 5'10" | Freshman | Elmhurst, Illinois | Transferred to Western Michigan |
| Caitlin Elam | 8 | DF/MF | 5'5" | Sophomore | Loveland, Ohio | N/A |
| Nina Nicosia | 10 | MF | 5'8" | Freshman | La Grange, Illinois | Signed contract with Chicago Mustangs |
| Taylor Kerwin | 11 | MF/FW | 5'7" | (redshirt) Senior | Whitefish Bay, Wisconsin | Graduated |
| Mikayla Hampton | 14 | FW | 5'6" | Graduate Student | Cincinnati, Ohio | Graduated |
| Julia Simon | 16 | FW | 5'5" | Freshman | Wheaton, Illinois | Transferred to Saint Louis |
| Kiana Klein | 17 | MF | 6'0" | Senior | Lebanon, Ohio | Graduated |
| Delaney Snyder | 24 | FW | 5'4" | Senior | Moon Township, Pennsylvania | Graduated |
| Cassie Amshoff | 26 | FW | 5'7" | Senior | Louisville, Kentucky | Graduated |

=== Incoming transfers ===
Incoming transfers
| Name | Number | Pos. | Height | Year | Hometown | Previous school |
|---|---|---|---|---|---|---|
| Alyssa Zalac | 1 | GK | 5'9" | (redshirt) Freshman | Montreal, Canada | Ole Miss |
| Patricia Ward | 3 | FW | 5'6" | Graduate Student | Newport News, Virginia | Minnesota |
| Autumn Weeks | 10 | DF | 5'7" | Senior | East Peoria, Illinois | IUPUI |
| Madison Ellsworth | 32 | DF | 5'7" | (redshirt) Senior | Hillsboro, Oregon | Oregon State |

=== Recruiting class ===
| Name | Nationality | Hometown | Club | TDS Rating |
|---|---|---|---|---|
| Karsyn Cherry; DF | (United States) | Lafayette, Indiana | Indiana Fire Juniors | 3/5 stars |
| Addison Chester; FW | (United States) | Muncie, Indiana | FC Pride | 4/5 stars |
| Erynn Floyd; GK | (United States) | Wilton, Connecticut | Connecticut FC | 3/5 stars |
| Mackenzie Geigle; FW | (United States) | Raleigh, North Carolina | North Carolina Courage | 3/5 stars |
| Riley Goss; MF | (United States) | Suffolk, Virginia | Richmond United | 2/5 stars |
| Emerson Jennings; FW | (United States) | Noblesville, Indiana | Indiana Fire Academy | 3/5 stars |
| Evelyn Pazienza; FW | (United States) | Pewee Valley, Kentucky | Racing Louisville FC Academy | 2/5 stars |
| Emma Kate Schroll; MF | (United States) | Dacula, Georgia | Concorde Fire SC | 3/5 stars |
| Elizabeth Sexton; MF | (United States) | Cincinnati, Ohio | Ohio Elite SA | 3/5 stars |
| Hadley Snyder; DF | (United States) | Louisville, Kentucky | Javanon | 2/5 stars |

== Squad ==
=== Roster ===
As of December 9, 2022

Note: Flags indicate national team as defined under FIFA eligibility rules; some limited exceptions apply. Players may hold more than one non-FIFA nationality.

| No. | Pos. | Nation | Player |
|---|---|---|---|
| 0 | GK | USA | Olivia Pratapas |
| 1 | GK | CAN | Alyssa Zalac |
| 2 | MF | USA | Sarah Hernandez |
| 3 | FW | USA | Patricia Ward |
| 4 | FW | USA | Emma Hiscock |
| 5 | FW | USA | Ravin Alexander |
| 6 | MF | USA | Riley Mullady |
| 8 | MF | USA | Maya Maxwell |
| 9 | DF | USA | Lilly Yordy |
| 10 | DF | USA | Autumn Weeks |
| 11 | MF | USA | Addie Chester |
| 12 | FW | USA | Corinne Dente |
| 13 | MF | USA | Ava Nielson |
| 14 | MF | USA | Lizzie Sexton |
| 15 | MF | USA | Hayley Howard |

| No. | Pos. | Nation | Player |
|---|---|---|---|
| 17 | MF | USA | Riley Goss |
| 18 | DF | ENG | Anouk Denton |
| 19 | MF | USA | Maisie Whitsett |
| 20 | FW | USA | Savina Zamborini |
| 21 | DF | USA | Sophia Zinn |
| 22 | DF | USA | Karsyn Cherry |
| 23 | MF | USA | Morgan Bentley |
| 24 | FW | USA | Mackenzie Geigle |
| 25 | DF | USA | Hadley Snyder |
| 26 | MF | USA | Emma Kate Schroll |
| 27 | FW | USA | Emersen Jennings |
| 28 | MF | USA | Brooke Dardano |
| 29 | FW | USA | Evelyn Pazienza |
| 30 | GK | USA | Erynn Floyd |
| 32 | DF | USA | Madison Ellsworth |

=== Team management ===
| Position | Staff |
|---|---|
| Karen Ferguson-Dayes | Head coach |
| Nick Stirrett | Assistant Coach |
| Hunter Norton | Assistant Coach |
| Declan Doherty | Performance Analyst |
| Jing Hughley | Director of Operations |

== Schedule ==
| Date Time, TV | Rank^{#} | Opponent^{#} | Result | Record | Site (Attendance) City, State |
Exhibition
| August 12*; 7:30 p.m. | | Cincinnati | W 2–0 | – | Lynn Stadium; Louisville, KY |
Non-conference regular season
| August 18*; 7:30 p.m., ACCNX | | UIC | W 3–0 | 1–0–0 | Lynn Stadium (250); Louisville, KY |
| August 25*; 7:30 p.m., ACCNX | | Xavier | L 1–2 | 1–1–0 | Lynn Stadium (815); Louisville, KY |
| August 28*; 7:00 p.m., ESPN+ | | at Northern Kentucky | W 1–0 | 2–1–0 | NKU Soccer Stadium (778); Highland Heights, KY |
| September 1*; 7:00 p.m. | | vs. No. 23 Memphis | W 3–2 | 3–1–0 | Sentara Park (42); Harrisonburg, VA |
| September 4*; 1:00 p.m., ESPN+ | | at James Madison | T 0–0 | 3–1–1 | Sentara Park (317); Harrisonburg, VA |
| September 8*; 7:30 p.m., ACCNX | | Indiana | T 0–0 | 3–1–2 | Lynn Stadium (450); Louisville, KY |
ACC regular season
| September 17; 7:00 p.m., ACCNX | | Miami (FL) | W 1–0 | 4–1–2 (1–0–0) | Lynn Stadium (650); Louisville, KY |
| September 22; 7:00 p.m., ACCNX | | at No. 7 Florida State | L 1–5 | 4–2–2 (1–1–0) | Seminole Soccer Complex (1,222); Tallahassee, FL |
| September 25; 2:00 p.m., ACCNX | | at No. 2 Virginia | L 0–2 | 4–3–2 (1–2–0) | Klöckner Stadium (1,924); Charlottesville, VA |
| October 1; 7:00 p.m., ACCNX | | at No. 14 Pittsburgh | L 0–1 | 4–4–2 (1–3–0) | Ambrose Urbanic Field (409); Pittsburgh, PA |
| October 6; 7:00 p.m., ACCNX | | Clemson | L 1–2 | 4–5–2 (1–4–0) | Lynn Stadium (871); Louisville, KY |
| October 9; 12:00 p.m., ACCN | | Boston College | W 1–0 | 5–5–2 (2–4–0) | Lynn Stadium (350); Louisville, KY |
| October 15; 7:00 p.m., ACCNX | | No. 6 Notre Dame | L 0–2 | 5–6–2 (2–5–0) | Lynn Stadium (413); Louisville, KY |
| October 20; 7:00 p.m., ACCNX | | at NC State | W 1–0 | 6–6–2 (3–5–0) | Dail Soccer Field (481); Raleigh, NC |
| October 23; 1:00 p.m., ACCNX | | at No. 10 Duke | L 0–4 | 6–7–2 (3–6–0) | Koskinen Stadium (704); Durham, NC |
| October 27; 6:00 p.m., ACCN | | No. 2 North Carolina | L 0–2 | 6–8–2 (3–7–0) | Lynn Stadium (450); Louisville, KY |
*Non-conference game. ^{#}Rankings from United Soccer Coaches. (#) Tournament seedings in parentheses.

== Rankings ==
Ranking movements Legend: — = Not ranked
| | Week | | | | | | | | | | | | | | | | |
| Poll | Pre | 1 | 2 | 3 | 4 | 5 | 6 | 7 | 8 | 9 | 10 | 11 | 12 | 13 | 14 | 15 | Final |
|---|---|---|---|---|---|---|---|---|---|---|---|---|---|---|---|---|---|
| United Soccer | — | — | — | — | — | — | — | — | — | — | — | — | Not released | | | | — |
| TopDrawer Soccer | — | — | — | — | — | — | — | — | — | — | — | — | — | — | — | — | — |
