= 2022 Boston College Eagles women's soccer team =

American college soccer season

2022 Boston College Eagles women's soccer
- Conference: Atlantic Coast Conference
- Record: 5–8–5 (1–7–2 ACC)
- Head coach: Jason Lowe (4th season)
- Assistant coaches: Taylor Schram (2nd season); Dirk Vandeveer (1st season)
- Home stadium: Newton Campus Soccer Field

2022 ACC women's soccer standings
	Conf.						Overall
Team	W		L		T	PCT	W		L		T	PCT
No. 2 North Carolina ‍†‍‍^{y}	8	–	2	–	0	.800	20	–	5	–	1	.788
No. 3 Florida State ‍†‍‡‍^{y}	8	–	2	–	0	.800	17	–	3	–	3	.804
No. 5 Notre Dame ‍‍‍^{y}	7	–	2	–	1	.750	17	–	3	–	3	.804
No. 7 Virginia ‍‍‍^{y}	6	–	2	–	2	.700	16	–	4	–	3	.761
No. 6 Duke ‍‍‍^{y}	6	–	2	–	2	.700	15	–	5	–	3	.717
No. 12 Pittsburgh ‍‍‍^{y}	5	–	3	–	2	.600	14	–	5	–	3	.705
Clemson ‍‍‍^{y}	4	–	3	–	3	.550	8	–	5	–	5	.583
Virginia Tech ‍‍‍^{y}	4	–	5	–	1	.450	10	–	7	–	2	.579
Wake Forest ‍‍‍^{y}	3	–	6	–	1	.350	9	–	7	–	3	.553
Louisville ‍‍‍	3	–	7	–	0	.300	6	–	8	–	2	.438
NC State ‍‍‍^{y}	2	–	6	–	2	.300	7	–	7	–	6	.500
Miami (FL) ‍‍‍	2	–	7	–	1	.250	5	–	8	–	3	.406
Syracuse ‍‍‍	1	–	6	–	3	.250	8	–	7	–	3	.528
Boston College ‍‍‍	1	–	7	–	2	.200	5	–	8	–	5	.417
† – Conference champion ‡ – 2022 ACC Tournament champion y – Invited to the NCAA Tournament; Source: The ACC; As of December 6, 2022; Rankings from United Soccer Coaches Poll

The 2022 Boston College Eagles women's soccer team represented Boston College during the 2022 NCAA Division I women's soccer season. The Eagles were led by head coach Jason Lowe, in his fourth season. They played home games at Newton Campus Soccer Field. This is the team's 42nd season playing organized women's college soccer, and their 18th playing in the Atlantic Coast Conference.

The Eagles finished 5–8–5 overall and 1–7–2 in ACC play to finish in fourteenth place. They did not qualify for the ACC Tournament and were not invited to the NCAA Tournament.

== Previous season ==
The Eagles finished 7–10–1 overall and 1–9–0 in ACC play to finish in a tie for twelfth place. They did not qualify for the ACC Tournament and were not invited to the NCAA Tournament.

== Offseason ==
=== Departures ===
Departures
Name	Number	Pos.	Height	Year	Hometown	Reason for departure
Mackenzie Egan	0	GK	5'7"	Junior	Parker, Colorado	N/A
Haley Thomas	3	DF	5'8"	Graduate Student	Kennewick, Washington	Graduated; Signed with ÍBV.
Jenna Bike	4	FW	5'6"	Graduate Student	Trumbull, Connecticut	Graduated
Zoie Allen	7	FW	5'7"	Sophomore	Smithfield, Rhode Island	Transferred to Purdue
Emily Knous	10	MF	5'7"	Senior	Long Beach, California	Graduated
Becca McCourt	11	DF	5'5"	Junior	Danville, California	N/A
Megan Crevoiserat	12	MF	5'7"	Senior	Mequon, Wisconsin	Graduated
Linda Boama	13	FW	5'6"	Sophomore	Reykjavík, Iceland	N/A
Taliyah Walker	14	DF	5'6"	Freshman	Toronto, Canada	N/A
Abby McNamara	17	FW	5'10"	Graduate Student	Dayton, Ohio	Graduated
Rebecca Groseibl	18	MF	5'7"	Sophomore	Hardwick, New Jersey	Transferred to Towson
Emma Goggins	19	DF	5'4"	Sophomore	Orange County, California	N/A
Mia Karras	24	DF	5'4"	Graduate Student	Middleton, Massachusetts	Graduated
Jessica Carlton	32	MF	5'4"	Freshman	Upland, California	N/A

=== Incoming transfers ===
Incoming transfers
Name	Number	Pos.	Height	Year	Hometown	Previous school
Alycia Morin	7	FW	5'10"	Graduate Student	Montreal, Quebec	Bishop's University
Emily Sapienza	10	MF	5'8"	Junior	Raleigh, North Carolina	Rutgers
Claire Mensi	13	DF	6'0"	Graduate Student	Katonah, New York	Bucknell

=== Recruiting class ===
Name	Nationality	Hometown	Club	TDS Rating
Emma Badger; DF	(United States)	Wells, Maine	Seacoast United	2/5 stars
Brooke Gierczak; DF	(United States)	San Diego, California	Rebels Soccer Club	3/5 stars
Reilly Johnson; MF	(United States)	Wilmington, North Carolina	Wilmington Hammerheads FC	2/5 stars
Riley Kerber; MF	(United States)	Medina, Ohio	Internationals SC (Ohio)	3/5 stars
Sophia Lowenberg; MF	(United States)	Trumbull, Connecticut	Connecticut FC	4/5 stars
Ava McNeil; DF	(United States)	Roslindale, Massachusetts	NEFC	2/5 stars
Sydney Segalla; FW	(United States)	Salisbury, Connecticut	Connecticut FC	4/5 stars
Kenna Thomas; DF	(United States)	Simi Valley, California	LAFC So Cal	2/5 stars

== Squad ==
=== Roster ===
As of December 1, 2022

Note: Flags indicate national team as defined under FIFA eligibility rules; some limited exceptions apply. Players may hold more than one non-FIFA nationality.

No.	Pos.	Nation	Player
1	GK	GER	Wiebke Willebrandt
2	GK	USA	Eva Nahas
3	MF	USA	Jessica Carlton
4	DF	USA	Sarai Costello
5	MF	USA	Sonia Walk
6	DF	IRL	Éabha O'Mahony
7	FW	CAN	Alycia Morin
8	MF	USA	Laura Gouvin
9	MF	USA	Sam Smith
10	MF	USA	Emily Sapienza
11	DF	USA	Brooke Gierczak
12	MF	USA	Riley Kerber
13	DF	USA	Claire Mensi
15	MF	USA	Samantha Agresti

No.	Pos.	Nation	Player
16	DF	USA	Kate Goggins
17	FW	USA	Sydney Segalla
18	MF	USA	Reilly Johnson
20	DF	ISL	Ragna Magnúsdóttir
21	FW	USA	Andi Barth
22	FW	USA	Ella Richards
23	DF	USA	Michela Agresti
24	DF	USA	Jordan Teguis
25	MF	USA	Sophia Lowenberg
26	DF	USA	Ava McNeil
27	DF	USA	Sydney Moore
29	DF	USA	Emma Badger
30	DF	USA	Kenna Thomas

=== Team management ===
Position	Staff
Head coach	Jason Lowe
Associate head coach	Taylor Schram
Assistant Coach	Dirk Vandeveer

== Schedule ==
Date Time, TV	Rank^{#}	Opponent^{#}	Result	Record	Site (Attendance) City, State
Exhibition
August 7; 7:00 p.m.		at UMass Lowell	W 2–0	-	Cushing Field Complex; Lowell, MA
August 12; 3:00 p.m.		at Colgate	W 1–0	-	Beyer-Small Field; Hamilton, NY
Non-conference regular season
August 18; 5:30 p.m., ACCNX		Villanova	W 3–0	1–0–0	Newton Campus Soccer Field (347); Chestnut Hill, MA
August 21; 1:00 p.m., FloSports		at Northeastern	W 4–1	2–0–0	Parsons Field (132); Boston, MA
August 25; 7:00 p.m., ACCNX		Michigan	L 0–1	2–1–0	Newton Campus Soccer Field (437); Chestnut Hill, MA
August 28; 1:00 p.m., ACCNX		Holy Cross	W 3–0	3–1–0	Newton Campus Soccer Field (218); Chestnut Hill, MA
September 1; 4:00 p.m., ESPN+		at UMass	T 2–2	3–1–1	Rudd Field (265); Amherst, MA
September 4; 4:00 p.m., ESPN+		at Boston	W 3–1	4–1–1	Nickerson Field (4,082); Boston, MA
September 8; 6:00 p.m., FloSports		at Providence	T 1–1	4–1–2	Chapey Field (398); Providence, RI
September 11; 1:30 p.m., ACCN		Army	T 2–2	4–1–3	Newton Campus Soccer Field (454); Chestnut Hill, MA
ACC regular season
September 16; 4:00 p.m., ACCNX		No. 12т Florida State	L 0–6	4–2–3 (0–1–0)	Newton Campus Soccer Field (406); Chestnut Hill, MA
September 22; 7:00 p.m., ACCNX		at No. 5 Duke	L 0–3	4–3–3 (0–2–0)	Koskinen Stadium (613); Durham, NC
September 25; 1:00 p.m., ACCNX		at No. 3 North Carolina	L 0–3	4–4–3 (0–3–0)	Dorrance Field (2,111); Chapel Hill, NC
September 29; 6:00 p.m., ACCN		No. 16 Notre Dame	L 0–3	4–5–3 (0–4–0)	Newton Campus Soccer Field (441); Chestnut Hill, MA
October 6; 5:30 p.m., ACCNX		Syracuse	W 1–0	5–5–3 (1–4–0)	Newton Campus Soccer Field (298); Chestnut Hill, MA
October 9; 12:00 p.m., ACCN		at Louisville	L 0–1	5–6–3 (1–5–0)	Lynn Stadium (350); Louisville, KY
October 15; 7:00 p.m., ACCNX		No. 21 Pittsburgh	T 1–1	5–6–4 (1–5–1)	Newton Campus Soccer Field (642); Chestnut Hill, MA
October 20; 6:00 p.m., ACCNX		at Miami (FL)	L 0–1	5–7–4 (1–6–1)	Cobb Stadium (224); Coral Gables, FL
October 23; 1:00 p.m., ACCNX		at Clemson	L 0–3	5–8–4 (1–7–1)	Riggs Field (713); Clemson, SC
October 27; 7:00 p.m., ACCNX		Wake Forest	T 1–1	5–8–5 (1–7–2)	Newton Campus Soccer Field (358); Chestnut Hill, MA
*Non-conference game. ^{#}Rankings from United Soccer Coaches. (#) Tournament seedings in parentheses. All times are in Eastern.

== Rankings ==
Ranking movements Legend: — = Not ranked
	Week																
Poll	Pre	1	2	3	4	5	6	7	8	9	10	11	12	13	14	15	Final
United Soccer	—	—	—	—	—	—	—	—	—	—	—	—	Not released				—
TopDrawer Soccer	—	—	—	—	—	—	—	—	—	—	—	—	—	—	—	—	—
