= 2022 Miami Hurricanes women's soccer team =

2022 Miami Hurricanes women's soccer
- Conference: Atlantic Coast Conference
- Record: 5–8–3 (2–7–1 ACC)
- Head coach: Sarah Barnes (5th season)
- Assistant coaches: Alan Fread (5th season); Jeremy Williams (5th season)
- Home stadium: Cobb Stadium

2022 ACC women's soccer standings
	Conf.						Overall
Team	W		L		T	PCT	W		L		T	PCT
No. 2 North Carolina ‍†‍‍^{y}	8	–	2	–	0	.800	20	–	5	–	1	.788
No. 3 Florida State ‍†‍‡‍^{y}	8	–	2	–	0	.800	17	–	3	–	3	.804
No. 5 Notre Dame ‍‍‍^{y}	7	–	2	–	1	.750	17	–	3	–	3	.804
No. 7 Virginia ‍‍‍^{y}	6	–	2	–	2	.700	16	–	4	–	3	.761
No. 6 Duke ‍‍‍^{y}	6	–	2	–	2	.700	15	–	5	–	3	.717
No. 12 Pittsburgh ‍‍‍^{y}	5	–	3	–	2	.600	14	–	5	–	3	.705
Clemson ‍‍‍^{y}	4	–	3	–	3	.550	8	–	5	–	5	.583
Virginia Tech ‍‍‍^{y}	4	–	5	–	1	.450	10	–	7	–	2	.579
Wake Forest ‍‍‍^{y}	3	–	6	–	1	.350	9	–	7	–	3	.553
Louisville ‍‍‍	3	–	7	–	0	.300	6	–	8	–	2	.438
NC State ‍‍‍^{y}	2	–	6	–	2	.300	7	–	7	–	6	.500
Miami (FL) ‍‍‍	2	–	7	–	1	.250	5	–	8	–	3	.406
Syracuse ‍‍‍	1	–	6	–	3	.250	8	–	7	–	3	.528
Boston College ‍‍‍	1	–	7	–	2	.200	5	–	8	–	5	.417
† – Conference champion ‡ – 2022 ACC Tournament champion y – Invited to the NCAA Tournament; Source: The ACC; As of December 6, 2022; Rankings from United Soccer Coaches Poll

The 2022 Miami Hurricanes women's soccer team represented University of Miami during the 2022 NCAA Division I women's soccer season. The Hurricanes were led by head coach Sarah Barnes, in her fifth season. They played home games at Cobb Stadium. This was the team's 24th season playing organized women's college soccer and their 19th playing in the Atlantic Coast Conference.

The Hurricanes finished the season 5–8–3 overall and 2–7–1 in ACC play to finish in twelfth place. They did not qualify for the ACC Tournament and were not invited to the NCAA Tournament.

== Previous season ==
The Hurricanes finished the season 4–12–0 overall, and 1–9–0 in ACC play to finish in a tie for twelfth place. They did not qualify for the ACC Tournament and were not invited to the NCAA Tournament.

== Offseason ==
=== Departures ===
Departures
Name	Number	Pos.	Height	Year	Hometown	Reason for departure
Tyler Speaks	1	GK	5'7"	Senior	Dunwoody, Georgia	Graduated
Mia Atrio	3	FW	5'3"	Sophomore	Coral Gables, Florida	N/A
Johanna Barth	4	MF	5'6"	Senior	Rydeback, Sweden	Graduated
Gudrun Haralz	8	FW	5'7"	(redshirt) Junior	Kópavogur, Iceland	Transferred to New Hampshire
Selena Fortich	14	DF	5'9"	Senior	Glen Head, New York	Graduated
Michaela Baker	20	MF/FW	5'3"	Sophomore	San Diego, California	N/A

=== Incoming transfers ===
Incoming transfers
Name	Number	Pos.	Height	Year	Hometown	Previous school
Chole O'Neill	12	FW	5'2"	Graduate Student	Fort Lauderdale, Florida	Villanova
Megan Morgan	25	FW	5'4"	(redshirt) Freshman	Weston, Florida	Florida State

=== Recruiting class ===
Name	Nationality	Hometown	Club	TDS Rating
Zoey Lee; MF	(United States)	Madison, Alabama	IMG Academy	4/5 stars
Jordan Losey; DF	(United States)	Corona, California	Legends FC	3/5 stars
Tusca Mahmoudpour; FW	(United States)	Lorton, Virginia	Virginia Union	2/5 stars
Emma Pidding; FW	(United States)	San Diego, California	San Diego Surf	3/5 stars
Reese Wheeler; DF	(United States)	St. Johns, Florida	Bartram Trail	2/5 stars

== Squad ==
=== Roster ===
As of December 9, 2022

Note: Flags indicate national team as defined under FIFA eligibility rules; some limited exceptions apply. Players may hold more than one non-FIFA nationality.

No.	Pos.	Nation	Player
0	GK	CAN	Melissa Dagenais
2	FW	CAN	Maya Rogers
3	DF	USA	Adrianna Serna
5	MF	USA	Claire Llewellyn
6	FW	USA	Gabriela Rusek
9	FW	USA	Tusca Mahmoudpour
10	MF	USA	Julia Edwards
11	MF	USA	Zoey Lee
12	FW	USA	Chloe O'Neill
13	MF	USA	Katerina Molina
14	FW	USA	Emma Pidding
15	DF	USA	Hanna Dawbarn
16	FW	USA	Jackie Koerwitz
17	MF	ISL	María Jakobsdóttir

No.	Pos.	Nation	Player
18	DF	USA	Jordan Losey
19	DF	USA	Delaney Brown
20	DF	USA	Reese Wheeler
21	MF	USA	Lauren Meeks
22	FW	USA	Taylor Shell
23	MF	USA	Jordan Felton
24	FW	CAN	Mikayla Tupper
25	FW	USA	Megan Morgan
26	MF	USA	Emma Tucker
27	GK	USA	Skylah Klein
28	MF	USA	Annie Blair
29	DF	USA	Hallie Salas
31	FW	USA	Jaclyn Marra

=== Team management ===
Position	Staff
Head coach	Sarah Barnes
Assistant Coach	Jeremy Williams
Assistant Coach	Alan Fread
Director of Operations	Kayley Sullivan

== Schedule ==
Date Time, TV	Rank^{#}	Opponent^{#}	Result	Record	Site (Attendance) City, State
Exhibition
August 6*; 6:00 p.m.		Florida Gulf Coast	T 2–2	–	Cobb Stadium; Coral Gables, FL
August 12*; 4:30 p.m.		at UCF	L 0–3	–	UCF Soccer and Track Stadium; Orlando, FL
August 14*; 11:30 a.m.		at Lynn	None Reported	–	Bobby Campbell Stadium; Boca Raton, FL
Non-conference regular season
August 18*; 7:00 p.m., ACCNX		Mississippi State	T 0–0	0–0–1	Cobb Stadium (242); Coral Gables, FL
August 21*; 5:00 p.m., ACCNX		Alabama	W 1–0	1–0–1	Cobb Stadium (535); Coral Gables, FL
August 25*; 7:00 p.m., CUSA.tv		at FAU	T 0–0	1–0–2	FAU Soccer Stadium (278); Boca Raton, FL
August 28*; 6:00 p.m., ACCNX		North Florida	W 1–0	2–0–2	Cobb Stadium (479); Coral Gables, FL
September 1*; 7:00 p.m., ACCNX		FIU	Postponed		Cobb Stadium; Coral Gables, FL
September 4*; 12:00 p.m., ACCNX		Oklahoma State	W 2–1	3–0–2	Cobb Stadium (210); Coral Gables, FL
September 8*; 6:00 p.m., ESPN+		at South Florida	L 0–2	3–1–2	Corbett Stadium (362); Tampa, FL
ACC regular season
September 17; 7:00 p.m., ACCNX		at Louisville	L 0–1	3–2–2 (0–1–0)	Lynn Stadium (650); Louisville, KY
September 22; 6:00 p.m., ACCN		at Pittsburgh	L 1–3	3–3–2 (0–2–0)	Ambrose Urbanic Field (505); Pittsburgh, PA
September 25; 1:00 p.m., ACCNX		at Syracuse	L 1–3	3–4–2 (0–3–0)	SU Soccer Stadium (96); Syracuse, NY
October 1; 5:00 p.m., ACCNX		No. 7 Florida State; Rivalry	L 0–1	3–5–2 (0–4–0)	Cobb Stadium (562); Coral Gables, FL
October 6; 6:00 p.m., ACCNX		No. 24 Virginia Tech	W 3–1	4–5–2 (1–4–0)	Cobb Stadium (392); Coral Gables, FL
October 9; 1:00 p.m., ACCNX		at Wake Forest	L 0–2	4–6–2 (1–5–0)	Spry Stadium (637); Winston-Salem, NC
October 15; 7:00 p.m., ACCNX		at NC State	T 3–3	4–6–3 (1–5–1)	Dail Soccer Field (600); Raleigh, NC
October 20; 6:00 p.m., ACCNX		Boston College	W 1–0	5–6–3 (2–5–1)	Cobb Stadium (224); Coral Gables, FL
October 23; 1:00 p.m., ACCNX		No. 2 North Carolina	L 0–4	5–7–3 (2–6–1)	Cobb Stadium (414); Coral Gables, FL
October 27; 6:00 p.m., ACCNX		No. 8 Virginia	L 0–1	5–8–3 (2–7–1)	Cobb Stadium (287); Coral Gables, FL
*Non-conference game. ^{#}Rankings from United Soccer Coaches. (#) Tournament seedings in parentheses.

== Rankings ==
Ranking movements Legend: — = Not ranked
	Week																
Poll	Pre	1	2	3	4	5	6	7	8	9	10	11	12	13	14	15	Final
United Soccer	—	—	—	—	—	—	—	—	—	—	—	—	Not released				—
TopDrawer Soccer	—	—	—	—	—	—	—	—	—	—	—	—	—	—	—	—	—
