= 2022 Wake Forest Demon Deacons women's soccer team =

American college soccer season

2022 Wake Forest Demon Deacons women's soccer

NCAA Tournament, First Round
- Conference: Atlantic Coast Conference
- Record: 9–7–3 (3–6–1 ACC)
- Head coach: Tony da Luz (26th season)
- Assistant coaches: Brittany Cameron (3rd season); Courtney Drummond (1st season)
- Home stadium: Spry Stadium

2022 ACC women's soccer standings
	Conf.						Overall
Team	W		L		T	PCT	W		L		T	PCT
No. 2 North Carolina ‍†‍‍^{y}	8	–	2	–	0	.800	20	–	5	–	1	.788
No. 3 Florida State ‍†‍‡‍^{y}	8	–	2	–	0	.800	17	–	3	–	3	.804
No. 5 Notre Dame ‍‍‍^{y}	7	–	2	–	1	.750	17	–	3	–	3	.804
No. 7 Virginia ‍‍‍^{y}	6	–	2	–	2	.700	16	–	4	–	3	.761
No. 6 Duke ‍‍‍^{y}	6	–	2	–	2	.700	15	–	5	–	3	.717
No. 12 Pittsburgh ‍‍‍^{y}	5	–	3	–	2	.600	14	–	5	–	3	.705
Clemson ‍‍‍^{y}	4	–	3	–	3	.550	8	–	5	–	5	.583
Virginia Tech ‍‍‍^{y}	4	–	5	–	1	.450	10	–	7	–	2	.579
Wake Forest ‍‍‍^{y}	3	–	6	–	1	.350	9	–	7	–	3	.553
Louisville ‍‍‍	3	–	7	–	0	.300	6	–	8	–	2	.438
NC State ‍‍‍^{y}	2	–	6	–	2	.300	7	–	7	–	6	.500
Miami (FL) ‍‍‍	2	–	7	–	1	.250	5	–	8	–	3	.406
Syracuse ‍‍‍	1	–	6	–	3	.250	8	–	7	–	3	.528
Boston College ‍‍‍	1	–	7	–	2	.200	5	–	8	–	5	.417
† – Conference champion ‡ – 2022 ACC Tournament champion y – Invited to the NCAA Tournament; Source: The ACC; As of December 6, 2022; Rankings from United Soccer Coaches Poll

The 2022 Wake Forest Demon Deacons women's soccer team represented Wake Forest University during the 2022 NCAA Division I women's soccer season. The Demon Deacons were led by head coach Tony da Luz, in his twenty-sixth season. They played their home games at Spry Stadium. This was the team's 28th season playing organized women's college soccer, all of which have been played in the Atlantic Coast Conference.

The Demon Deacons finished the season 9–7–3 overall and 3–6–1 in ACC ACC play to finish in ninth place. They were not invited to the ACC Tournament, but did receive an at-large invitation to the NCAA Tournament. As an unseeded team in the Alabama Bracket, they had a First Round match at South Carolina, which they lost 2–0 to end their season.

== Previous season ==
The Demon Deacons finished the season 16–6–0 overall, and 6–4–0 in ACC play to finish in sixth place. As the sixth seed in the ACC Tournament, they defeated Duke in the First Round before losing in overtime to eventual champions Florida State in the Semifinals. They received an at-large bid to the NCAA Tournament. As an unseeded team, they defeated Harvard in the First Round before losing to Michigan in the Second Round to end their season.

== Offseason ==
=== Departures ===
Departures
Name	Number	Pos.	Height	Year	Hometown	Reason for departure
Ashley Frank	5	FW	5'2"	Senior	Niceville, Florida	Graduated
Jenna Menta	9	FW	5'7"	Graduate Student	Somers, New York	Graduated; selected 30th overall in the 2022 NWSL Draft
Faith Adams	15	MF	5'5"	Sophomore	Charlotte, North Carolina	Transferred to Lipscomb
Mia Raben	16	GK	5'9"	(redshirt) Junior	Greenwood Village, Colorado	Graduated
Shayla Smart	20	FW	5'2"	Senior	Apopka, Florida	Graduated
Ryanne Brown	21	FW	5'8"	Senior	Indianapolis, Indiana	Graduated; selected 21st overall in the 2022 NWSL Draft
Lauren Tangney	23	MF	5'2"	(redshirt) Junior	Fairfield, Connecticut	Graduated
Mia Albery	26	DF	5'9"	(redshirt) Junior	Denver, Colorado	Graduated
Sofia Rossi	28	MF	5'5"	(redshirt) Senior	Akron, Ohio	Graduated
Julda Arnarsdottir	88	FW	5'6"	(redshirt) Senior	Reykjavík, Iceland	Graduated

=== Recruiting class ===
Name	Nationality	Hometown	Club	TDS Rating
Taryn Chance; DF	(United States)	Stafford, Virginia	Virginia Union	2/5 stars
Laine DeNatale; DF	(United States)	Locust Valley, New York	SUSA FC Academy	2/5 stars
Chidubem Dike; FW	(United States)	Greenville, South Carolina	Carolina Elite Soccer Academy	4/5 stars
Courtney Evans; DF	(United States)	Springfield, Virginia	Virginia Development Academy	4/5 stars
Baylor Goldthwaite; DF	(United States)	Durham, North Carolina	North Carolina Courage Academy	3/5 stars
Caiya Hanks; MF	(United States)	Kailua-Kona, Hawaii	Kona Crush Soccer Academy	2/5 stars
Hannah Johnson; FW	(United States)	Atlanta, GA	Concorde Fire SC	3/5 stars
Aisha Polk; FW	(United States)	Dallas, Texas	Dallas Sting	2/5 stars
Brooke Potter; FW	(United States)	Williamsburg, Virginia	Virginia Development Academy	4/5 stars
Allison Schmidt; DF	(United States)	Bainbridge, Ohio	Internationals SC (OH)	3/5 stars
Carly Wilson; MF	(United States)	Atlanta, GA	Concorde Fire SC	3/5 stars
Alexandra Wood; FW	(United States)	Huntington Beach, California	Beach FC (CA)	2/5 stars

== Squad ==
=== Roster ===
As of December 12, 2022

Note: Flags indicate national team as defined under FIFA eligibility rules; some limited exceptions apply. Players may hold more than one non-FIFA nationality.

No.	Pos.	Nation	Player
00	GK	USA	Madison Howard
1	GK	USA	Kaitlyn Parks
2	MF	USA	Reese Kim
3	MF	USA	Giovanna DeMarco
4	MF	CAN	Nikayla Small
5	DF	USA	Courtney Evans
6	MF	USA	Madeline Allburn
7	DF	ISL	Kristin Johnson
8	MF	USA	Kristi Vierra
9	MF	USA	Caiya Hanks
10	MF	ENG	Malaika Meena
11	FW	USA	Liv Stowell
13	MF	USA	Emily Morris
14	FW	USA	Carrie McIntire
15	FW	USA	Brooke Potter
16	FW	USA	Alex Wood
17	DF	USA	Tyla Ochoa
18	DF	USA	Kate Dobsch
19	MF	USA	Lyndon Wood

No.	Pos.	Nation	Player
20	FW	USA	Hannah Johnson
21	MF	USA	Baylor Goldthwaite
22	DF	USA	Sasha Schwartz
23	DF	USA	Allie Schmidt
24	DF	USA	Zara Chavoshi
25	MF	USA	Sophie Faircloth
26	DF	USA	Taryn Chance
27	DF	USA	Nadia DeMarinis
28	MF	USA	Carly Wilson
29	DF	USA	Olivia DeMarinis
30	MF	USA	Anna Swanson
31	MF	USA	Olivia Duvall
32	MF	USA	Emily Silva
33	DF	USA	Abbie Colton
34	DF	USA	Laurel Ansbrow
35	GK	USA	Payton Cahill
36	MF	USA	Aisha Polk
39	DF	USA	Laine Denatale
99	FW	USA	Chidubem Dike

=== Team management ===
Position	Staff
Head coach	Tony da Luz
Associate Head Coach	Brittany Cameron
Assistant Coach	Courtney Drummond

== Schedule ==
Date Time, TV	Rank^{#}	Opponent^{#}	Result	Record	Site City, State
Exhibition
August 12*; 6:00 p.m.		Richmond	Not Reported	–	Spry Stadium; Winston-Salem, NC
August 14*; 7:00 p.m.		at James Madison	Not Reported	–	Sentara Park; Harrisonburg, VA
Non-conference regular season
August 18*; 7:00 p.m., ACCNX		Milwaukee	W 2–0	1–0–0	Spry Stadium (1,047); Winston-Salem, NC
August 21*; 7:00 p.m., ACCNX		Rhode Island	W 4–1	2–0–0	Spry Stadium (456); Winston-Salem, NC
August 25*; 5:00 p.m., ACCNX		Georgia	W 1–0	3–0–0	Spry Stadium (891); Winston-Salem, NC
August 28*; 1:00 p.m., ACCNX		No. 16 Auburn	T 0–0	3–0–1	Spry Stadium (402); Winston-Salem, NC
September 1*; 4:00 p.m., ESPN+		at High Point	W 7–0	4–0–1	Vert Stadium (509); High Point, NC
September 4*; 1:00 p.m., ESPN+		at Oakland	W 1–0	5–0–1	Oakland Soccer Field (129); Rochester, MI
September 8*; 7:00 p.m., BTN+	No. 24т	at Maryland	W 1–0	6–0–1	Ludwig Field (702); College Park, MD
September 11*; 2:00 p.m., ESPN+	No. 24т	at Loyola (MD)	T 0–0	6–0–2	Ridley Athletic Complex (150); Baltimore, MD
ACC regular season
September 18; 7:00 p.m., ACCN		at NC State	L 1–2	6–1–2 (0–1–0)	Dail Soccer Field (629); Raleigh, NC
September 22; 8:00 p.m., ACCN		No. 14 Clemson	W 4–1	7–1–2 (1–1–0)	Spry Stadium (821); Winston-Salem, NC
September 25; 5:00 p.m., ACCN		Virginia Tech	L 0–2	7–2–2 (1–2–0)	Spry Stadium (627); Winston-Salem, NC
October 2; 12:00 p.m., ACCN		Syracuse	W 2–0	8–2–2 (2–2–0)	Spry Stadium (371); Winston-Salem, NC
October 6; 7:00 p.m., ACCNX		at No. 7 Duke	L 1–2	8–3–2 (2–3–0)	Koskinen Stadium (682); Durham, NC
October 9; 1:00 p.m., ACCNX		Miami (FL)	W 2–0	9–3–2 (3–3–0)	Spry Stadium (637); Winston-Salem, NC
October 14; 7:00 p.m., ACCNX		at No. 2т North Carolina	L 0–1	9–4–2 (3–4–0)	Dorrance Field (3,263); Chapel Hill, NC
October 20; 7:00 p.m., ACCNX		at No. 8 Virginia	L 0–1	9–5–2 (3–5–0)	Klöckner Stadium (1,317); Charlottesville, VA
October 23; 5:00 p.m., ACCNX		No. 5 Notre Dame	L 0–3	9–6–2 (3–6–0)	Spry Stadium (803); Winston-Salem, NC
October 27; 7:00 p.m., ACCNX		at Boston College	T 1–1	9–6–3 (3–6–1)	Newton Campus Soccer Field (358); Chestnut Hill, MA
NCAA tournament
November 12; 6:00 p.m., ESPN+		at (3) South Carolina; First Round	L 0–2	9–7–3	Stone Stadium (1,670); Columbia, SC
*Non-conference game. ^{#}Rankings from United Soccer Coaches. (#) Tournament seedings in parentheses.

== Awards and honors ==
Recipient	Award	Date	Ref.
Kaitlyn Parks	Hermann Trophy Preseason Watchlist	August 18	
Caiya Hanks	ACC All-Freshman Team	November 2	

== Rankings ==
Ranking movements Legend: ██ Increase in ranking ██ Decrease in ranking — = Not ranked RV = Received votes т = Tied with team above or below
	Week																
Poll	Pre	1	2	3	4	5	6	7	8	9	10	11	12	13	14	15	Final
United Soccer	RV	RV	RV	24т	RV	—	—	—	—	—	—	—	Not released				—
TopDrawer Soccer	—	—	—	—	—	—	—	—	—	—	—	—	—	—	—	—	—

== 2023 NWSL Draft ==
Player	Team	Round	Pick #	Position
Giovanna DeMarco	San Diego Wave FC	4	45	MF
