= 2022 Virginia Tech Hokies women's soccer team =

American college soccer season

2022 Virginia Tech Hokies women's soccer

NCAA Tournament, First Round
- Conference: Atlantic Coast Conference
- U. Soc. Coaches poll: No. RV
- Record: 10–6–2 (4–5–1 ACC)
- Head coach: Charles Adair (12th season)
- Assistant coaches: Drew Kopp (11th season); Matt Gwilliam (8th season)
- Home stadium: Thompson Field

2022 ACC women's soccer standings
	Conf.						Overall
Team	W		L		T	PCT	W		L		T	PCT
No. 2 North Carolina ‍†‍‍^{y}	8	–	2	–	0	.800	20	–	5	–	1	.788
No. 3 Florida State ‍†‍‡‍^{y}	8	–	2	–	0	.800	17	–	3	–	3	.804
No. 5 Notre Dame ‍‍‍^{y}	7	–	2	–	1	.750	17	–	3	–	3	.804
No. 7 Virginia ‍‍‍^{y}	6	–	2	–	2	.700	16	–	4	–	3	.761
No. 6 Duke ‍‍‍^{y}	6	–	2	–	2	.700	15	–	5	–	3	.717
No. 12 Pittsburgh ‍‍‍^{y}	5	–	3	–	2	.600	14	–	5	–	3	.705
Clemson ‍‍‍^{y}	4	–	3	–	3	.550	8	–	5	–	5	.583
Virginia Tech ‍‍‍^{y}	4	–	5	–	1	.450	10	–	7	–	2	.579
Wake Forest ‍‍‍^{y}	3	–	6	–	1	.350	9	–	7	–	3	.553
Louisville ‍‍‍	3	–	7	–	0	.300	6	–	8	–	2	.438
NC State ‍‍‍^{y}	2	–	6	–	2	.300	7	–	7	–	6	.500
Miami (FL) ‍‍‍	2	–	7	–	1	.250	5	–	8	–	3	.406
Syracuse ‍‍‍	1	–	6	–	3	.250	8	–	7	–	3	.528
Boston College ‍‍‍	1	–	7	–	2	.200	5	–	8	–	5	.417
† – Conference champion ‡ – 2022 ACC Tournament champion y – Invited to the NCAA Tournament; Source: The ACC; As of December 6, 2022; Rankings from United Soccer Coaches Poll

The 2022 Virginia Tech Hokies women's soccer team represented Virginia Tech during the 2022 NCAA Division I women's soccer season. It was the 30th season of the university fielding a program and 19th competing in the Atlantic Coast Conference. The Hokies were led by 12th year head coach Charles Adair and played their home games at Thompson Field.

The team finished 10–6–2 overall and 4–5–1 in ACC play to finish in eighth place. They did not qualify for the ACC Tournament as only six teams were invited. They received an at-large bid to the NCAA Tournament. As an unseeded team in the UCLA Bracket they travelled to seventh-seed West Virginia in the First Round. They lost the game 2–0 to end their season.

== Previous season ==
The Hokies finished the season 12–6–2, 5–3–2 in ACC play to finish in eight place. They did not qualify for the ACC Tournament as only six teams were invited. They received an at-large bid to the NCAA Tournament where they defeated Ohio State in the First Round before losing to Arkansas in the Second Round to end their season.

== Offseason ==
=== Departures ===
Departures
Name	Number	Pos.	Height	Year	Hometown	Reason for departure
Emily Gray	4	MF	5'4"	Senior	Sewell, New Jersey	Graduated, drafted 3rd overall in the 2022 NWSL Draft
Emma Steigerwald	9	DF	5'4"	Senior	Downingtown, Pennsylvania	Graduated
Nicole Kozlova	10	FW	5'5"	(redshirt) Junior	Toronto, Canada	Graduated, signed with HB Køge
Karlie Johnson	13	FW	5'9"	Senior	Keller, Texas	Graduated
Erin Carleton	16	MF	5'8"	Sophomore	Powder Springs, Georgia	N/A
Holly Weber	19	MF	5'6"	(redshirt) Sophomore	Springfield, Virginia	N/A
S.A. Phillips	30	GK	5'7"	(redshirt) Junior	Pawleys Island, South Carolina	Graduated

=== Recruiting class ===
Name	Nationality	Hometown	Club	TDS Rating
Courtney Andersen; MF	(United States)	Clifton, Virginia	TSJ FC Virginia	4/5 stars
Ella Ciardullo; FW	(United States)	Milton, Georgia	Tophat SC	3/5 stars
Kendall DiMillio; DF	(United States)	Broadlands, Virginia	TSJ FC Virginia	3/5 stars
Natalie Mitchell; MF	(United States)	Temecula, California	San Diego Surf	2/5 stars
Maysen Nelson; DF	(United States)	Woodbridge, Virginia	TSJ FC Virginia	2/5 stars
Ines Obradovac; MF	(United States)	Woodstock, Georgia	United Futbol Academy	2/5 stars
Bella Pontieri; FW	(United States)	Jacksonville, Florida	United Soccer Alliance	3/5 stars
Taylor Price; FW	(United States)	Ashburn, Virginia	TSJ FC Virginia	4/5 stars
Emily Stanley; GK	(United States)	Grand Blanc, Michigan	Nationals	2/5 stars
Ella Valente; FW	(United States)	Sterling, Virginia	Virginia Union	NR

== Squad ==
=== Roster ===
As of September 27, 2022

Note: Flags indicate national team as defined under FIFA eligibility rules; some limited exceptions apply. Players may hold more than one non-FIFA nationality.

No.	Pos.	Nation	Player
00	GK	USA	Lauren Hargrove
0	GK	USA	Dare Burnett
1	GK	USA	Alia Skinner
2	MF	USA	Riley McCarthy
3	FW	USA	Kendal Feighan
4	FW	USA	Ines Obradovac
5	DF	FIN	Aino Vuorinen
6	MF	USA	Makenzie Graham
7	MF	USA	Avery Tharrington
8	FW	USA	Ayden Yates
9	FW	USA	Calista Heister
10	FW	USA	Bella Pontieri
11	MF	USA	Gabby Johnson
12	FW	USA	Tori Powell
13	DF	USA	Victoria Moser
14	DF	USA	Allie Lewis
15	FW	USA	Sophie Maltese
16	FW	USA	Allie George

No.	Pos.	Nation	Player
17	MF	USA	Courtney Andersen
18	MF	USA	Lauren Gogal
19	FW	USA	Natalie Mitchell
20	DF	USA	Victoria Haugen
21	DF	USA	Averi Visage
22	FW	USA	Taylor Bryan
23	FW	USA	Kate Bonshak
24	FW	USA	Emmalee McCarter
25	FW	USA	Taylor Price
26	MF	USA	Emma Pelkowski
27	DF	USA	Ava Veith
28	FW	USA	Ella Ciardullo
29	MF	USA	Kendall DiMillio
31	DF	USA	Maysen Nelson
32	FW	USA	Emma Stanley
34	FW	USA	Ella Valente
35	FW	USA	Ruby Darling

== Team management ==
Position	Staff
Head coach	Charles Adair
Associate Head Coach	Drew Kopp
Assistant Coach	Matt Gwilliam

== Schedule ==
Date Time, TV	Rank^{#}	Opponent^{#}	Result	Record	Site (Attendance) City, State
Exhibition
August 9*; 5:00 p.m.		at Richmond	W 4–0	–	President's Field; Richmond, VA
August 13*; 11:00 a.m.		at Loyola (MD)	W 1–0	–	Ridley Athletic Complex; Baltimore, MD
Non-conference regular season
August 18*; 6:00 p.m., FloSports		at William & Mary	W 4–3	1–0–0	Albert–Daly Field (1,096); Williamsburg, VA
August 21*; 12:00 p.m., ACCNX		Indiana	T 0–0	1–0–1	Thompson Field (1,832); Blacksburg, VA
August 27*; 7:00 p.m., ACCNX		Delaware	W 2–0	2–0–1	Thompson Field (603); Blacksburg, VA
August 28*; 7:00 p.m., FloSports		at Elon	W 5–1	3–0–1	Rudd Field (513); Elon, NC
September 1*; 6:00 p.m., ESPN+		at Old Dominion	W 3–0	4–0–1	Old Dominion Soccer Complex (1,033); Norfolk, VA
September 4*; 5:00 p.m., ACCNX		Charlotte	W 3–0	5–0–1	Thompson Field (329); Blacksburg, VA
September 8*; 6:00 p.m., ACCNX		No. 4 South Carolina	L 1–2	5–1–1	Thompson Field (1,214); Blacksburg, VA
September 11*; 1:00 p.m., ACCNX		Northern Colorado	W 5–2	6–1–1	Thompson Field (218); Blacksburg, VA
ACC regular season
September 16; 5:00 p.m., ACCNX		Pittsburgh	L 1–4	6–2–1 (0–1–0)	Thompson Field (708); Blacksburg, VA
September 22; 7:00 p.m., ACCNX		at NC State	W 1–0	7–2–1 (1–1–0)	Dail Soccer Field (766); Raleigh, NC
September 25; 5:00 p.m., ACCN		at Wake Forest	W 2–0	8–2–1 (2–1–0)	Spry Stadium (627); Winston-Salem, NC
October 1; 7:00 p.m., ACCNX		No. 3 North Carolina	W 2–1	9–2–1 (3–1–0)	Thompson Field (284); Blacksburg, VA
October 6; 6:00 p.m., ACCN	No. 24	at Miami (FL)	L 1–3	9–3–1 (3–2–0)	Cobb Stadium (392); Coral Gables, FL
October 9; 1:00 p.m., ACCNX	No. 24	at Clemson	L 1–2	9–4–1 (3–3–0)	Riggs Field (723); Clemson, SC
October 13; 8:00 p.m., ACCN		No. 13 Virginia; Rivalry	T 3–3	9–4–2 (3–3–1)	Thompson Field (1,702); Blacksburg, VA
October 20; 7:00 p.m., ACCNX		No. 5 Notre Dame	L 0–1	9–5–2 (3–4–1)	Thompson Field (478); Blacksburg, VA
October 23; 1:00 p.m., ACCNX		Syracuse	W 2–0	10–5–2 (4–4–1)	Thompson Field (521); Blacksburg, VA
October 27; 7:00 p.m., ACCNX		at No. 5 Florida State	L 1–4	10–6–2 (4–5–1)	Seminole Soccer Complex (1,227); Tallahassee, FL
NCAA tournament
November 13; 1:00 p.m., ESPN+		at (7) West Virginia; First Round	L 0–2	10–7–2	Dick Dlesk Soccer Stadium (1,221); Morgantown, WV
*Non-conference game. ^{#}Rankings from United Soccer Coaches. (#) Tournament seedings in parentheses. All times are in Eastern.

== Awards and honors ==
Recipient	Award	Date	Ref.
Victoria Haugen	ACC Defensive Player of the Week	September 27	
Tori Powell	ACC Co-Offensive Player of the Week	October 4	
Taylor Bryan	ACC Co-Offensive Player of the Week	October 18	
Taylor Price	All-ACC Third Team	November 2	
Taylor Price	ACC All-Freshman Team	November 2	

== Rankings ==
Ranking movements Legend: ██ Increase in ranking ██ Decrease in ranking — = Not ranked RV = Received votes
	Week																
Poll	Pre	1	2	3	4	5	6	7	8	9	10	11	12	13	14	15	Final
United Soccer	—	RV	RV	RV	—	—	RV	24	—	—	RV	RV	Not released				—
TopDrawer Soccer	—	—	—	—	—	—	—	—	—	—	—	—	—	—	—	—	—
