= 2022 Duke Blue Devils women's soccer team =

American college soccer season

2022 Duke Blue Devils women's soccer

NCAA Tournament, Quarterfinals
- Conference: Atlantic Coast Conference
- U. Soc. Coaches poll: No. 6
- TopDrawerSoccer.com: No. 8
- Record: 15–5–3 (6–2–2 ACC)
- Head coach: Robbie Church (22nd season)
- Assistant coaches: Kieran Hall (4th season); Carla Overbeck (29th season); Lane Davis (7th season)
- Home stadium: Koskinen Stadium

2022 ACC women's soccer standings
	Conf.						Overall
Team	W		L		T	PCT	W		L		T	PCT
No. 2 North Carolina ‍†‍‍^{y}	8	–	2	–	0	.800	20	–	5	–	1	.788
No. 3 Florida State ‍†‍‡‍^{y}	8	–	2	–	0	.800	17	–	3	–	3	.804
No. 5 Notre Dame ‍‍‍^{y}	7	–	2	–	1	.750	17	–	3	–	3	.804
No. 7 Virginia ‍‍‍^{y}	6	–	2	–	2	.700	16	–	4	–	3	.761
No. 6 Duke ‍‍‍^{y}	6	–	2	–	2	.700	15	–	5	–	3	.717
No. 12 Pittsburgh ‍‍‍^{y}	5	–	3	–	2	.600	14	–	5	–	3	.705
Clemson ‍‍‍^{y}	4	–	3	–	3	.550	8	–	5	–	5	.583
Virginia Tech ‍‍‍^{y}	4	–	5	–	1	.450	10	–	7	–	2	.579
Wake Forest ‍‍‍^{y}	3	–	6	–	1	.350	9	–	7	–	3	.553
Louisville ‍‍‍	3	–	7	–	0	.300	6	–	8	–	2	.438
NC State ‍‍‍^{y}	2	–	6	–	2	.300	7	–	7	–	6	.500
Miami (FL) ‍‍‍	2	–	7	–	1	.250	5	–	8	–	3	.406
Syracuse ‍‍‍	1	–	6	–	3	.250	8	–	7	–	3	.528
Boston College ‍‍‍	1	–	7	–	2	.200	5	–	8	–	5	.417
† – Conference champion ‡ – 2022 ACC Tournament champion y – Invited to the NCAA Tournament; Source: The ACC; As of December 6, 2022; Rankings from United Soccer Coaches Poll

The 2022 Duke Blue Devils women's soccer team represented Duke University during the 2022 NCAA Division I women's soccer season. The Blue Devils were led by head coach Robbie Church, in his twenty-second season. They played home games at Koskinen Stadium. This was the team's 35th season playing organized women's college soccer and their 34th playing in the Atlantic Coast Conference.

The team finished 15–5–3 overall and 6–2–2 in ACC play to finish in a tie for fourth place. As the fifth-seed in the ACC Tournament, they defeated fourth-seed Virginia in the first round, but lost to North Carolina in the semifinal. They received an at-large bid to the NCAA Tournament, where they were the second seed in the Alabama Bracket. They defeated Radford in the first round, seventh-seed Texas in the second round, and third-seed South Carolina in the round of 16 before falling in overtime to first-seed Alabama in the quarterfinals.

== Previous season ==
The Blue Devils finished the season with a 16–4–1 record, 7–2–1 in ACC play to finish in third place. The lost in the first round of the ACC Tournament. They received an at-large bid to the NCAA Tournament where they were awarded one of the top four seeds. They defeated Old Dominion in the first round, Memphis in the second round, and St. John's in the round of 16 before losing to Santa Clara in the semifinals to end their season.

== Offseason ==
=== Departures ===
Departures
Name	Number	Pos.	Height	Year	Hometown	Reason for departure
Maddie Nielsen	1	GK	6'2"	Senior	Shoreline, Washington	Graduated
Caitlin Cosme	6	DF	5'5"	Graduate Student	New Hyde Park, New York	Graduated; Drafted 10th overall in the 2022 NWSL Draft
Tess Boade	8	MF	5'4"	Graduate Student	Highlands Ranch, Colorado	Graduated
Marykate McGuire	12	FW	5'4"	Senior	Portsmouth, Rhode Island	Graduated; Transferred to Ole Miss
Sydney Simmons	16	MF	5'7"	Senior	Van Alstyne, Texas	Graduated
Holland Stam	23	GK	6'0"	Senior	Ipswich, Massachusetts	Graduated
Bria Schrotenboer	27	DF	5'11"	Junior	Holland, Michigan	Transferred to Michigan State
Lily Nabet	28	GK	6'0"	Senior	Charlotte, North Carolina	Graduated; Drafted 36th overall in the 2022 NWSL Draft

=== Incoming transfers ===
Incoming transfers
Name	Number	Pos.	Height	Year	Hometown	Previous school
Jenna Royson	25	DF	5'8"	Graduate Student	Toms River, New Jersey	Georgetown

=== Recruiting class ===
Name	Nationality	Hometown	Club	TDS Rating
Caroline Duffy; GK	(United States)	Clarksville, Maryland	Maryland United FC	4/5 stars
Taylor Evans; MF	(United States)	Highlands Ranch, Colorado	Real Colorado	3/5 stars
Carina Lageyre; MF	(United States)	Cooper City, Florida	Florida United SC	4/5 stars
Devin Lynch; MF	(United States)	Naperville, Illinois	Sockers FC	4/5 stars
Elle Piper; DF	(United States)	San Jose, California	Bay Area Surf	4/5 stars
Katherine Rader; FW	(United States)	Stuart, Florida	Florida United SC	4/5 stars

== Squad ==
=== Roster ===
As of December 21, 2022

Note: Flags indicate national team as defined under FIFA eligibility rules; some limited exceptions apply. Players may hold more than one non-FIFA nationality.

No.	Pos.	Nation	Player
1	GK	USA	Caroline Duffy
2	FW	USA	Kat Rader
3	DF	SEN	Dieynaba Ndaw
4	DF	USA	Baleigh Bruster
5	MF	USA	Sarah Piper
6	MF	USA	Devin Lynch
7	MF	USA	Sophie Jones
8	FW	USA	Elle Piper
9	FW	USA	Grace Watkins
10	FW	USA	Olivia Migli
11	MF	USA	Julia Burnell
12	MF	USA	Taylor Evans
13	FW	USA	Emmy Duerr

No.	Pos.	Nation	Player
14	MF	USA	Julia Hannon
15	DF	USA	Emily Royson
16	MF	USA	Carina Lageyre
17	DF	USA	Nicole Chico
18	FW	USA	Michelle Cooper
19	MF	USA	Maggie Graham
20	DF	USA	Kelly Wilson
21	DF	USA	Katie Groff
22	DF	USA	Delaney Graham
24	MF	USA	Mackenzie Pluck
25	DF	USA	Jenna Royson
26	GK	USA	Ruthie Jones

=== Team management ===
Position	Staff
Head coach	Robbie Church
Assistant coach	Kieran Hall
Assistant coach	Carla Overbeck
Assistant coach	Lane Davis

== Schedule ==
Date Time, TV	Rank^{#}	Opponent^{#}	Result	Record	Site (Attendance) City, State
Exhibition
August 8*; 6:00 p.m.	No. 2	Georgia	L 1–2	–	Turner Soccer Complex; Athens, GA
August 12*; 6:00 p.m.	No. 2	No. 12 South Carolina	W 2–1	–	Koskinen Stadium; Durham, NC
Non-conference regular season
August 18*; 7:00 p.m., ESPN+	No. 2	at East Carolina	W 1–0	1–0–0	Stewart Johnson Stadium (1,335); Greenville, SC
August 21*; 6:00 p.m., ACCNX	No. 2	UNC Greensboro	W 3–1	2–0–0	Koskinen Stadium (707); Durham, NC
August 25*; 7:00 p.m., SECN	No. 5	at No. 22 Tennessee	W 3–2	3–0–0	Regal Stadium (1,622); Knoxville, TN
August 28*; 6:00 p.m., ACCNX	No. 5	Charlotte	W 4–0	4–0–0	Koskinen Stadium (661); Durham, NC
September 1*; 7:30 p.m., ACCNX	No. 2	No. 3 UCLA	L 1–2	4–1–0	Koskinen Stadium (1,074); Durham, NC
September 4*; 8:00 p.m., ESPN+	No. 2	at No. 6т TCU	W 3–1	5–1–0	Garvey-Rosenthal Stadium (3,648); Fort Worth, TX
September 8*; 8:00 p.m., ACCN	No. 3	No. 2 North Carolina; Rivalry	L 3–0	5–2–0	Koskinen Stadium (3,527); Durham, NC
ACC regular season
September 16; 7:00 p.m., ACCNX	No. 3	at Syracuse	W 1–0	6–2–0 (1–0–0)	SU Soccer Stadium (637); Syracuse, NY
September 22; 7:00 p.m., ACCNX	No. 5	Boston College	W 3–0	7–2–0 (2–0–0)	Koskinen Stadium (615); Durham, NC
September 25; 7:00 p.m., ACCN	No. 5	at No. 22 NC State	W 6–0	8–2–0 (3–0–0)	Dail Soccer Field (1,254); Raleigh, NC
October 2; 1:00 p.m., ACCNX	No. 4	No. 2 Virginia	L 0–1	8–3–0 (3–1–0)	Koskinen Stadium (848); Durham, NC
October 6; 7:00 p.m., ACCNX	No. 7	Wake Forest	W 2–1	9–3–0 (4–1–0)	Koskinen Stadium (682); Durham, NC
October 9; 1:00 p.m., ACCNX	No. 7	No. 13 Pittsburgh	W 1–0	10–3–0 (5–1–0)	Koskinen Stadium (645); Durham, NC
October 13; 6:00 p.m., ACCN	No. 12	at No. 4 Florida State	L 1–5	10–4–0 (5–2–0)	Seminole Soccer Complex (1,310); Tallahassee, FL
October 20; 7:00 p.m., ACCNX	No. 10	at Clemson	T 0–0	10–4–1 (5–2–1)	Riggs Field (852); Clemson, SC
October 23; 1:00 p.m., ACCNX	No. 10	Louisville	W 4–0	11–4–1 (6–2–1)	Koskinen Stadium (704); Durham, NC
October 27; 8:00 p.m., ACCN	No. 11	at No. 4 Notre Dame	T 2–2	11–4–2 (6–2–2)	Alumni Stadium (817); Notre Dame, IN
ACC tournament
October 30; 8:00 p.m., ACCN	(5) No. 11	at (4) No. 8 Virginia; First Round	W 2–1	12–4–2	Klöckner Stadium (691); Charlottesville, VA
November 3; 5:30 p.m., ACCN	(5) No. 8	vs. (1) No. 2 North Carolina; Semifinal, Rivalry	T 0–0 (6–7 PKs) ^{2OT}	12–4–3	Sahlen's Stadium (2,686); Cary, NC
NCAA tournament
November 12; 7:00 p.m., ACCNX	(2) No. 8	Radford; First Round	W 4–0	13–4–3	Koskinen Stadium (785); Durham, NC
November 18; 6:30 p.m., ESPN+	(2) No. 8	(7) No. 16 Texas; Second Round	W 1–0	14–4–3	Koskinen Stadium (760); Durham, NC
November 20; 6:00 p.m., ESPN+	(2) No. 8	(3) No. 13 South Carolina; Round of 16	W 2–1	15–4–3	Koskinen Stadium (756); Durham, NC
November 25; 7:00 p.m., ESPN+	(2) No. 8	at (1) No. 3 Alabama; Quarterfinal	L 2–3 ^{2OT}	15–5–3	Alabama Soccer Stadium (1,790); Tuscaloosa, AL
*Non-conference game. ^{#}Rankings from United Soccer Coaches. (#) Tournament seedings in parentheses. All times are in Eastern.

== Awards and honors ==
Recipient	Award	Date	Ref.
Michelle Cooper	Preseason All-ACC Team	August 11	
Sophie Jones	Preseason All-ACC Team	August 11	
Michelle Cooper	Preseason Hermann Trophy Watchlist	August 18	
Michelle Cooper	ACC Co-Offensive Player of the Week	September 6	
Michelle Cooper	ACC Offensive Player of the Week	September 27	
Kat Rader	ACC Freshman of the Year	November 2	
Michelle Cooper	ACC Offensive Player of the Year	November 2	
Michelle Cooper	All-ACC First Team	November 2	
Sophie Jones	All-ACC Second Team	November 2	
Kat Rader	All-ACC Second Team	November 2	
Delaney Graham	All-ACC Second Team	November 2	
Ruthie Jones	All-ACC Second Team	November 2	
Kat Rader	ACC All-Freshman Team	November 2	
Ruthie Jones	All-ACC Tournament team	November 6	
Michelle Cooper	All-ACC Tournament team	November 6	
Kat Rader	All-ACC Tournament team	November 6	
Michelle Cooper	All-American	December 2	
Michelle Cooper	Hermann Trophy	January 6, 2023	

== Rankings ==
Ranking movements Legend: ██ Increase in ranking ██ Decrease in ranking ( ) = First-place votes
	Week																
Poll	Pre	1	2	3	4	5	6	7	8	9	10	11	12	13	14	15	Final
United Soccer	2 (2)	5	2	3	3	5	4	7	12	10	11	8	Not released				6
TopDrawer Soccer	5	3	2	4	5	5	5	6	6	10	9	9	9	9	6	8	8

== 2023 NWSL draft ==
Player	Team	Round	Pick #	Position
Michelle Cooper	Kansas City Current	1	2	FW
Delaney Graham	Washington Spirit	4	40	DF
Sophie Jones	Chicago Red Stars	4	43	MF
