= 2022 NC State Wolfpack women's soccer team =

American college soccer season

2022 NC State Wolfpack women's soccer

NCAA Tournament, First Round
- Conference: Atlantic Coast Conference
- Record: 7–7–6 (2–6–2 ACC)
- Head coach: Tim Santoro (11th season)
- Assistant coaches: Glen Tourville (6th season); Steve McKenna (6th season)
- Home stadium: Dail Soccer Field

2022 ACC women's soccer standings
	Conf.						Overall
Team	W		L		T	PCT	W		L		T	PCT
No. 2 North Carolina ‍†‍‍^{y}	8	–	2	–	0	.800	20	–	5	–	1	.788
No. 3 Florida State ‍†‍‡‍^{y}	8	–	2	–	0	.800	17	–	3	–	3	.804
No. 5 Notre Dame ‍‍‍^{y}	7	–	2	–	1	.750	17	–	3	–	3	.804
No. 7 Virginia ‍‍‍^{y}	6	–	2	–	2	.700	16	–	4	–	3	.761
No. 6 Duke ‍‍‍^{y}	6	–	2	–	2	.700	15	–	5	–	3	.717
No. 12 Pittsburgh ‍‍‍^{y}	5	–	3	–	2	.600	14	–	5	–	3	.705
Clemson ‍‍‍^{y}	4	–	3	–	3	.550	8	–	5	–	5	.583
Virginia Tech ‍‍‍^{y}	4	–	5	–	1	.450	10	–	7	–	2	.579
Wake Forest ‍‍‍^{y}	3	–	6	–	1	.350	9	–	7	–	3	.553
Louisville ‍‍‍	3	–	7	–	0	.300	6	–	8	–	2	.438
NC State ‍‍‍^{y}	2	–	6	–	2	.300	7	–	7	–	6	.500
Miami (FL) ‍‍‍	2	–	7	–	1	.250	5	–	8	–	3	.406
Syracuse ‍‍‍	1	–	6	–	3	.250	8	–	7	–	3	.528
Boston College ‍‍‍	1	–	7	–	2	.200	5	–	8	–	5	.417
† – Conference champion ‡ – 2022 ACC Tournament champion y – Invited to the NCAA Tournament; Source: The ACC; As of December 6, 2022; Rankings from United Soccer Coaches Poll

The 2022 NC State Wolfpack women's soccer team represented NC State University during the 2022 NCAA Division I women's soccer season. The Wolfpack were led by head coach Tim Santoro, in his eleventh season. They played their home games at Dail Soccer Field. This was the team's 39th season playing organized women's college soccer and their 36th playing in the Atlantic Coast Conference.

The team finished 7–7–6 overall and 2–6–2 in ACC play to finish in eleventh place. They did not qualify for the ACC Tournament. There seven overall wins were their worst since 2015, excluding a shortened 2020. They received an at-large bid to the NCAA Tournament. As the eighth-seed in the UCLA Bracket they hosted UCF who was ranked #20 in the polls at the time. The match ended in a 1–1 draw, but the Wolfpack lost the ensuing penalty shootout 4–2 to end their season.

== Previous season ==
The Wolfpack finished the season 9–9–2 overall and 4–6–0 in ACC play to finish in a tie for ninth place. They did not qualify for the ACC Tournament. They received an at-large bid to the NCAA Tournament. As an unseeded team in the Florida State Bracket they defeated South Florida in the First Round before losing to fourth seed Pepperdine in the Second Round to end their season.

== Offseason ==
=== Departures ===
Departures
Name	Number	Pos.	Height	Year	Hometown	Reason for departure
Denae Antoine	8	FW	5'4"	Senior	Chino, California	Graduated
Toni Starova	9	MF	5'8"	Junior	Prague, Czech Republic	Signed with Sparta Prague
Margot Ridgeway	13	DF	6'1"	Senior	Fair Haven, New Jersey	Graduated
Mia Thillet	20	DF	5'5"	Senior	Charlotte, North Carolina	Graduated
Michaela Virgin	21	MF	5'0"	Freshman	Apex, North Carolina	Transferred to Loyola (MD)
Sandra Geiselhart	22	MF	5'7"	Senior	Greensboro, North Carolina	Graduated
Cara Elmendorf	23	DF	5'7"	Freshman	Lake Mary, Florida	Transferred to Connecticut

=== Incoming transfers ===
Incoming transfers
Name	Number	Pos.	Height	Year	Hometown	Previous school
Alexis Strickland	23	FW	5'4"	Senior	Raleigh, North Carolina	Oklahoma

=== Recruiting class ===
Name	Nationality	Hometown	Club	TDS Rating
Taylor Chism; DF	(United States)	Wilmington, North Carolina	Wilmington Hammerheads	2/5 stars
Delaney Engel; MF	(United States)	Glen Ellyn, Illinois	FC United (IL)	2/5 stars
Kendall Holt; MF	(United States)	Wake Forest, North Carolina	NC Courage (Academy)	3/5 stars
Cienna Kim; FW	(United States)	Ellicott City, Maryland	IMG Academy	3/5 stars
Alex Mohr; DF	(United States)	Poway, California	San Diego Surf	3/5 stars
Eliza Rich; MF	(United States)	Huntersville, North Carolina	Charlotte Soccer Academy	3/5 stars

== Squad ==
=== Roster ===
As of December 16, 2022

Note: Flags indicate national team as defined under FIFA eligibility rules; some limited exceptions apply. Players may hold more than one non-FIFA nationality.

No.	Pos.	Nation	Player
0	GK	USA	Eden Millan
1	GK	USA	Grace Spriggs
2	DF	GER	Nina Zimmer
3	DF	USA	Briana Weber
4	FW	USA	Leyah Hall-Robinson
5	DF	USA	Jenna Butler
6	DF	GER	Lulu Guttenberger
7	MF	JPN	Emika Kawagishi
10	MF	GER	Annika Wohner
11	DF	USA	Fernanda Soto
12	MF	USA	Jaiden Thomas
13	DF	USA	Alex Mohr
14	FW	USA	Mia Vaughan
15	FW	USA	Jameese Joseph

No.	Pos.	Nation	Player
17	FW	USA	Brianna Holt
18	DF	USA	Madison Reid
19	GK	ESP	María Echezarreta
20	DF	USA	Brooklyn Holt
21	MF	USA	Delaney Engel
22	DF	USA	Taylor Chism
23	FW	USA	Alexis Strickland
24	MF	USA	Samantha Castro
25	MF	USA	Sarah Arnold
26	GK	USA	Nadia Stupec
27	MF	USA	Eliza Rich
28	DF	USA	Kayla Siddiqi
29	FW	USA	Cienna Kim

=== Team management ===
Position	Staff
Athletic Director	Boo Corrigan
Head coach	Tim Santoro
Associate head coach	Glen Tourville
Assistant Coach	Steve McKenna
Director of Operations	Kim Kern

== Schedule ==
Date Time, TV	Rank^{#}	Opponent^{#}	Result	Record	Site (Attendance) City, State
Exhibition
August 8*; 7:00 p.m.		Ohio State	W 2–0	–	Dail Soccer Field; Raleigh, NC
Non-conference regular season
August 18*; 7:00 p.m., ACCNX		Rhode Island	W 4–0	1–0–0	Dail Soccer Field (678); Raleigh, NC
August 21*; 1:00 p.m., ACCNX		VCU	W 2–1	2–0–0	Dail Soccer Field (521); Raleigh, NC
August 25*; 7:00 p.m., ACCNX		Campbell	W 1–0	3–0–0	Dail Soccer Field (1,153); Raleigh, NC
August 28*; 7:00 p.m., ACCNX		No. 11 Georgetown	T 2–2	3–0–1	Dail Soccer Field (1,198); Raleigh, NC
September 1*; 7:00 p.m., FloSports		at Elon	W 2–1	4–0–1	Rudd Field (583); Elon, NC
September 4*; 1:00 p.m., ACCNX		Harvard	L 0–2	4–1–1	Dail Soccer Field (445); Raleigh, NC
September 8*; 8:00 p.m., BTN+		at Nebraska	T 0–0	4–1–2	Hibner Stadium (750); Lincoln, NE
September 11*; 3:00 p.m., ESPNU		at No. 4 South Carolina	T 0–0	4–1–3	Stone Stadium (2,559); Columbia, SC
September 15*; 6:00 p.m., ACCN		High Point	W 3–1	5–1–3	Dail Soccer Field (793); Raleigh, NC
ACC regular season
September 18; 7:00 p.m., ACCN		Wake Forest	W 2–1	6–1–3 (1–0–0)	Dail Soccer Field (629); Raleigh, NC
September 22; 7:00 p.m., ACCNX	No. 22	Virginia Tech	L 0–1	6–2–3 (1–1–0)	Dail Soccer Field (766); Raleigh, NC
September 25; 7:00 p.m., ACCN	No. 22	No. 5 Duke	L 0–6	6–3–3 (1–2–0)	Dail Soccer Field (1,254); Raleigh, NC
September 29; 8:00 p.m., ACCN		at Clemson	W 2–1	7–3–3 (2–2–0)	Riggs Field (345); Clemson, SC
October 6; 8:00 p.m., ACCNX		at No. 17 Notre Dame	L 0–3	7–4–3 (2–3–0)	Alumni Stadium (321); Notre Dame, IN
October 9; 1:00 p.m., ACCNX		at No. 5 North Carolina; Rivalry	L 0–2	7–5–3 (2–4–0)	Dorrance Field (3,683); Chapel Hill, NC
October 15; 7:00 p.m., ACCNX		Miami (FL)	T 3–3	7–5–4 (2–4–1)	Dail Soccer Field (600); Raleigh, NC
October 20; 7:00 p.m., ACCNX		Louisville	L 0–1	7–6–4 (2–5–1)	Dail Soccer Field (481); Raleigh, NC
October 23; 2:00 p.m., ACCNX		at No. 8 Virginia	L 0–4	7–7–4 (2–6–1)	Klöckner Stadium (2,032); Charlottesville, VA
October 27; 7:00 p.m., ACCNX		at Syracuse	T 1–1	7–7–5 (2–6–2)	SU Soccer Stadium (162); Syracuse, NY
NCAA tournament
November 12; 12:00 p.m., ESPN+	(8)	No. 20 UCF; First Round	T 1–1 (2–4 PKs)	7–7–6	Dail Soccer Field (423); Raleigh, NC
*Non-conference game. ^{#}Rankings from United Soccer Coaches. (#) Tournament seedings in parentheses. All times are in Eastern.

== Rankings ==
Ranking movements Legend: ██ Increase in ranking ██ Decrease in ranking — = Not ranked RV = Received votes
	Week																
Poll	Pre	1	2	3	4	5	6	7	8	9	10	11	12	13	14	15	Final
United Soccer	—	RV	RV	—	—	22	—	—	—	—	—	—	Not released				—
TopDrawer Soccer	23	21	17	19	20	19	—	—	—	—	—	—	—	—	—	—	—

== Awards and honors ==
Recipient	Award	Date	Ref.
Jameese Joseph	Pre-season All-ACC Team	August 11	
Jameese Joseph	Pre-season Hermann Trophy Watchlist	August 18	
Jameese Joseph	All-ACC Third Team	November 2	
