= 2022 Clemson Tigers women's soccer team =

American college soccer season

2022 Clemson Tigers women's soccer

NCAA Tournament, First Round
- Conference: Atlantic Coast Conference
- U. Soc. Coaches poll: No. 25
- Record: 8–5–5 (4–3–3 ACC)
- Head coach: Eddie Radwanski (12th season)
- Assistant coaches: Jeff Robbins (12th season); Siri Mullinix (12th season)
- Home stadium: Riggs Field

2022 ACC women's soccer standings
	Conf.						Overall
Team	W		L		T	PCT	W		L		T	PCT
No. 2 North Carolina ‍†‍‍^{y}	8	–	2	–	0	.800	20	–	5	–	1	.788
No. 3 Florida State ‍†‍‡‍^{y}	8	–	2	–	0	.800	17	–	3	–	3	.804
No. 5 Notre Dame ‍‍‍^{y}	7	–	2	–	1	.750	17	–	3	–	3	.804
No. 7 Virginia ‍‍‍^{y}	6	–	2	–	2	.700	16	–	4	–	3	.761
No. 6 Duke ‍‍‍^{y}	6	–	2	–	2	.700	15	–	5	–	3	.717
No. 12 Pittsburgh ‍‍‍^{y}	5	–	3	–	2	.600	14	–	5	–	3	.705
Clemson ‍‍‍^{y}	4	–	3	–	3	.550	8	–	5	–	5	.583
Virginia Tech ‍‍‍^{y}	4	–	5	–	1	.450	10	–	7	–	2	.579
Wake Forest ‍‍‍^{y}	3	–	6	–	1	.350	9	–	7	–	3	.553
Louisville ‍‍‍	3	–	7	–	0	.300	6	–	8	–	2	.438
NC State ‍‍‍^{y}	2	–	6	–	2	.300	7	–	7	–	6	.500
Miami (FL) ‍‍‍	2	–	7	–	1	.250	5	–	8	–	3	.406
Syracuse ‍‍‍	1	–	6	–	3	.250	8	–	7	–	3	.528
Boston College ‍‍‍	1	–	7	–	2	.200	5	–	8	–	5	.417
† – Conference champion ‡ – 2022 ACC Tournament champion y – Invited to the NCAA Tournament; Source: The ACC; As of December 6, 2022; Rankings from United Soccer Coaches Poll

The 2022 Clemson Tigers women's soccer team represented Clemson University during the 2022 NCAA Division I women's soccer season. The Tigers were led by head coach Ed Radwanski, in his twelfth season. The Tigers home games were played at Riggs Field. This was the team's 29th season playing organized soccer, and all of those seasons were played in the Atlantic Coast Conference.

The team finished 8–5–5 overall and 4–3–3 in ACC play to finish in seventh place. The Tigers started the season ranked at #25 and moved up to #18 before losing 3–0 at Alabama. The loss cased them to fall out of the rankings, but they followed it up with a draw at #4 South Carolina in a rivalry match. Wins over then #17 West Virginia and #6 Notre Dame propelled them to #14 in the rankings. However, the team then went on a three game losing streak which saw them fall back out of the rankings. The Tigers played three more ranked teams during the season, beating #24 Virginia Tech and drawing with #10 Duke and #19 Pittsburgh.

They did not qualify for the ACC Tournament, finishing one spot outside of the six teams that qualified. They received an at-large invitation to the NCAA Tournament where they were a five-seed in the UCLA Bracket and hosted Vanderbilt in the First Round. They lost the game 0–1 to end their season. Their eight wins was their lowest total since 2013.

== Previous season ==
The Tigers finished the season 12–7–1 and 6–3–1 in ACC play to finish in fifth place. As the fifth seed in the ACC Tournament, they defeated Notre Dame before falling to Virginia in the Semifinals. They earned an at-large bid to the NCAA Tournament, where they lost to Alabama in the First Round to end their season.

== Offseason ==
=== Departures ===
Departures
Name	Number	Pos.	Height	Year	Hometown	Reason for departure
Grace Wagner	5	MF	5'8"	(redshirt) Junior	Cary, North Carolina	Graduated
Sydney Dawson	7	DF	5'6"	Senior	Akron, Ohio	Graduated
Renee Guion	19	DF	5'10"	Senior	Simpsonville, South Carolina	Graduated
Jackson Moehler	38	DF	5'10"	Senior	Marietta, Georgia	Graduated
Hensley Hancuff	51	GK	6'3"	Senior	Edmond, Oklahoma	Graduated; drafted 34th overall in the 2022 NWSL Draft by NJ/NY Gotham FC

=== Incoming transfers ===
Incoming transfers
Name	Number	Pos.	Height	Year	Hometown	Previous school
Kacey Smekrud	19	FW	5'11"	Senior	La Grange, Kentucky	College of Charleston

=== Recruiting class ===
Name	Nationality	Hometown	Club	TDS Rating
Kate Borner; DF	(United States)	Cumming, Georgia	United Futbol Academy (GA)	3/5 stars
Emily Brough; MF	(England)	Liverpool, England	Liverpool F.C. Women	N/A
Gabriella Gambino; MF	(United States)	Lewiston, New York	Western New York Flash	3/5 stars
Addyson Holgorsen; GK	(United States)	Charlotte, North Carolina	Charlotte Soccer Academy	2/5 stars
Maria Manousos; FW	(United States)	Weddington, North Carolina	Charlotte Soccer Academy	N/A
Emma Wennar; FW	(United States)	Milton, Vermont	FC Stars of Massachusetts	3/5 stars

== Squad ==
=== Roster ===
As of December 15, 2022

Note: Flags indicate national team as defined under FIFA eligibility rules; some limited exceptions apply. Players may hold more than one non-FIFA nationality.

No.	Pos.	Nation	Player
1	GK	USA	Halle Mackiewicz
2	DF	USA	Makenna Morris
3	DF	USA	Layne St. George
4	DF	USA	Harper White
5	MF	ENG	Emily Brough
6	MF	USA	Devi Dudley
7	DF	USA	Kate Borner
8	DF	ENG	Caitlin Smith
9	DF	USA	Mackenzie Duff
10	FW	USA	Renee Lyles
11	MF	USA	Cassidy Lindley
12	FW	USA	Sydney Minarik
13	FW	USA	Emma Wennar
14	FW	ENG	Fran Stables

No.	Pos.	Nation	Player
15	MF	USA	Hal Hershfelt
16	MF	USA	Ella Hauser
17	MF	USA	Emma Lerner
18	FW	USA	Maria Manousos
19	FW	USA	Kacey Smekrud
20	FW	USA	Courtney Jones
21	FW	USA	Maliah Morris
22	MF	USA	Gabby Gambino
23	FW	USA	Caroline Conti
24	DF	USA	Megan Bornkamp
26	GK	USA	Addy Holgorsen
27	DF	USA	Kate Borner
29	FW	USA	Sami Meredith
34	GK	USA	Ally Lynch

== Team management ==
Position	Staff
Athletic Director	(United States) Graham Neff
Head coach	(United States) Eddie Radwanski
Associate head coach	(United States) Jeff Robbins
Assistant coach	(United States) Siri Mullinix
Director of operations	(United States) Meredith Priest

== Schedule ==
Date Time, TV	Rank^{#}	Opponent^{#}	Result	Record	Site City, State
Exhibition
August 9*; 7:00 p.m.	No. 25	vs. No. 18 Ole Miss	None Reported	–	Atlanta United Training Ground; Atlanta, GA
August 14*; 11:00 a.m.	No. 25	UNC Wilmington	W 1–0	–	Riggs Field; Clemson, SC
Non-conference regular season
August 18*; 7:00 p.m., ACCNX	No. 25	Texas A&M	T 0–0	0–0–1	Riggs Field (1,018); Clemson, SC
August 21*; 6:00 p.m., ACCNX	No. 25	Campbell	W 5–1	1–0–1	Riggs Field (621); Clemson, SC
August 25*; 7:00 p.m., ESPN+	No. 18	at Western Carolina	W 6–0	2–0–1	Catamount Athletic Complex (1,212); Cullowhee, NC
August 28*; 7:00 p.m., SECN+	No. 18	at Alabama	L 0–3	2–1–1	Alabama Soccer Stadium (783); Tuscaloosa, AL
September 1*; 7:00 p.m., SECN+		at No. 4 South Carolina; Rivalry	T 2–2	2–1–2	Stone Stadium (5,330); Columbia, SC
September 4*; 2:00 p.m., ACCNX		Appalachian State	W 3–0	3–1–2	Riggs Field (372); Clemson, SC
September 8*; 7:00 p.m., ESPN+		at No. 17 West Virginia	W 1–0	4–1–2	Dick Dlesk Soccer Stadium (1,133); Morgantown, WV
ACC regular season
September 15; 7:00 p.m., ACCN	No. 24	No. 6 Notre Dame	W 2–0	5–1–2 (1–0–0)	Riggs Field (972); Clemson, SC
September 22; 8:00 p.m., ACCN	No. 14	at Wake Forest	L 1–4	5–2–2 (1–1–0)	Spry Stadium (821); Winston-Salem, NC
September 25; 1:00 p.m., ACCNX	No. 14	at No. 7 Florida State	L 1–3	5–3–2 (1–2–0)	Seminole Soccer Complex (2,125); Tallahassee, FL
September 29; 8:00 p.m., ACCN		NC State	L 1–2	5–4–2 (1–3–0)	Riggs Field (345); Clemson, SC
October 6; 7:00 p.m., ACCNX		at Louisville	W 2–1	6–4–2 (2–3–0)	Lynn Stadium (871); Louisville, KY
October 9; 1:00 p.m., ACCNX		No. 24 Virginia Tech	W 2–1	7–4–2 (3–3–0)	Riggs Field (723); Clemson, SC
October 14; 7:00 p.m., ACCNX		at Syracuse	T 1–1	7–4–3 (3–3–1)	SU Soccer Stadium (273); Syracuse, NY
October 20; 7:00 p.m., ACCNX		No. 10 Duke	T 0–0	7–4–4 (3–3–2)	Riggs Field (852); Clemson, SC
October 23; 1:00 p.m., ACCNX		Boston College	W 3–0	8–4–4 (4–3–2)	Riggs Field (713); Clemson, SC
October 27; 7:00 p.m., ACCNX		at No. 19 Pittsburgh	T 0–0	8–4–5 (4–3–3)	Ambrose Urbanic Field (723); Pittsburgh, PA
NCAA tournament
November 11; 3:00 p.m., ESPN+	(5)	Vanderbilt; First Round	L 0–1	8–5–5	Riggs Field (312); Clemson, SC
*Non-conference game. ^{#}Rankings from United Soccer Coaches. (#) Tournament seedings in parentheses. All times are in Eastern.

== Goals Record ==
Rank	No.	Nat.	Po.	Name	Regular season	NCAA Tournament	Total
1	10	(United States)	FW	Renee Lyles	4	0	4
1	23	(United States)	FW	Caroline Conti	4	0	4
3	2	(United States)	DF	Makenna Morris	3	0	3
3	5	(England)	MF	Emily Brough	3	0	3
3	12	(United States)	FW	Sydney Minarik	3	0	3
3	15	(United States)	MF	Hal Hershfelt	3	0	3
3	21	(United States)	FW	Maliah Morris	3	0	3
3	29	(United States)	FW	Sammi Meredith	3	0	3
9	18	(United States)	FW	Maria Manousos	2	0	2
10	24	(United States)	DF	Megan Bornkmap	1	0	1
Opponent own goal					1	0	1
Total					30	0	30

== Disciplinary record ==
Rank	No.	Nat.	Po.	Name	Regular Season			NCAA Tournament			Total		
Rank	No.	Nat.	Po.	Name	Booked	(yellow card) (yellow-red card)	Sent off (straight red)	Booked	(yellow card) (yellow-red card)	Sent off (straight red)	Booked	(yellow card) (yellow-red card)	Sent off (straight red)
1	24	(United States)	DF	Megan Bornkamp	5	0	0	0	0	0	5	0	0
2	15	(United States)	MF	Hal Hershfelt	2	0	0	1	0	0	3	0	0
3	2	(United States)	DF	Makenna Morris	2	0	0	0	0	0	2	0	0
3	3	(United States)	DF	Layne St. George	2	0	0	0	0	0	2	0	0
5	18	(United States)	FW	Maria Manousos	1	0	0	0	0	0	1	0	0
5	21	(United States)	FW	Maliah Morris	1	0	0	0	0	0	1	0	0
5	23	(United States)	FW	Caroline Conti	1	0	0	0	0	0	1	0	0
5	29	(United States)	FW	Sammi Meredith	1	0	0	0	0	0	1	0	0
Total					15	0	0	1	0	0	16	0	0

== Awards and honors ==
Recipient	Award	Date	Ref.
Megan Bornkamp	Pre-season All-ACC Team	August 11	
Megan Bornkamp	Hermann Trophy Preseason Watchlist	August 18	
Harper White	ACC Defensive Player of the Week	September 20	
Hal Hershfelt	All-ACC Second Team	November 2	
Megan Bornkamp	All-ACC Second Team	November 2	
Maliah Morris	All-ACC Third Team	November 2	
Caroline Conti	All-ACC Third Team	November 2	

== Rankings ==
Ranking movements Legend: ██ Increase in ranking ██ Decrease in ranking — = Not ranked RV = Received votes
	Week																
Poll	Pre	1	2	3	4	5	6	7	8	9	10	11	12	13	14	15	Final
United Soccer	25	18	—	—	24	14	—	—	RV	RV	RV	25	Not released				—
TopDrawer Soccer	15	14	16	18	19	15	24	—	—	—	—	—	—	—	—	—	—
