= 2022 Pittsburgh Panthers women's soccer team =

American college soccer season

2022 Pittsburgh Panthers women's soccer

NCAA Tournament, Round of 16
- Conference: Atlantic Coast Conference
- U. Soc. Coaches poll: No. 12
- TopDrawerSoccer.com: No. 20
- Record: 14–5–3 (5–3–2 ACC)
- Head coach: Randy Waldrum (5th season)
- Assistant coaches: Ben Waldrum (5th season); Dustin Stein (5th season)
- Home stadium: Ambrose Urbanic Field

2022 ACC women's soccer standings
	Conf.						Overall
Team	W		L		T	PCT	W		L		T	PCT
No. 2 North Carolina ‍†‍‍^{y}	8	–	2	–	0	.800	20	–	5	–	1	.788
No. 3 Florida State ‍†‍‡‍^{y}	8	–	2	–	0	.800	17	–	3	–	3	.804
No. 5 Notre Dame ‍‍‍^{y}	7	–	2	–	1	.750	17	–	3	–	3	.804
No. 7 Virginia ‍‍‍^{y}	6	–	2	–	2	.700	16	–	4	–	3	.761
No. 6 Duke ‍‍‍^{y}	6	–	2	–	2	.700	15	–	5	–	3	.717
No. 12 Pittsburgh ‍‍‍^{y}	5	–	3	–	2	.600	14	–	5	–	3	.705
Clemson ‍‍‍^{y}	4	–	3	–	3	.550	8	–	5	–	5	.583
Virginia Tech ‍‍‍^{y}	4	–	5	–	1	.450	10	–	7	–	2	.579
Wake Forest ‍‍‍^{y}	3	–	6	–	1	.350	9	–	7	–	3	.553
Louisville ‍‍‍	3	–	7	–	0	.300	6	–	8	–	2	.438
NC State ‍‍‍^{y}	2	–	6	–	2	.300	7	–	7	–	6	.500
Miami (FL) ‍‍‍	2	–	7	–	1	.250	5	–	8	–	3	.406
Syracuse ‍‍‍	1	–	6	–	3	.250	8	–	7	–	3	.528
Boston College ‍‍‍	1	–	7	–	2	.200	5	–	8	–	5	.417
† – Conference champion ‡ – 2022 ACC Tournament champion y – Invited to the NCAA Tournament; Source: The ACC; As of December 6, 2022; Rankings from United Soccer Coaches Poll

The 2022 Pittsburgh Panthers women's soccer team represented University of Pittsburgh during the 2022 NCAA Division I women's soccer season. The Panthers were led by head coach Randy Waldrum, in his fifth season. They played home games at Ambrose Urbanic Field. This was the team's 27th season playing organized women's college soccer and their 10th playing in the Atlantic Coast Conference.

The Panthers finished the season 14–5–3 overall and 5–3–2 in ACC play to finish in sixth place. As the sixth seed in the ACC Tournament they tied Notre Dame 1–1, but lost the ensuing penalty shoot-out 5–4. They received an at-large bid to the NCAA Tournament, the first tournament bid in program history. As the fourth-seed in the Florida State Bracket, they defeated Buffalo in the first round and, fifth-seed Georgetown in the second round before traveling to first-seed Florida State in the round of 16. The Panthers' run would end in Tallahassee where they lost 3–0.

== Previous season ==
The Panthers finished the season 11–7–0 overall, and 4–6–0 in ACC play to finish in ninth place. They did not qualify for the ACC Tournament and were not invited to the NCAA Tournament.

== Offseason ==
=== Departures ===
Departures
Name	Number	Pos.	Height	Year	Hometown	Reason for departure
Katherine Robinson	0	GK	6'0"	Senior	Albuquerque, New Mexico	Graduated
Eva Frankovic	13	DF	5'7"	Sophomore	North Huntingdon, Pennsylvania	Transferred to Bucknell
Sarah Sinnott	14	FW	5'4"	Junior	Pittsburgh, Pennsylvania	Signed with Maccabi Emek Hefer
Kate McKay	19	DF	5'10"	Senior	Scottsdale, Arizona	Graduated
Celia Lopez	21	MF	5'2"	Senior	Pamplona, Spain	Graduated
Lacey Bernick	23	FW	5'6"	Freshman	North Huntingdon, Pennsylvania	Transferred to Akron
Madison Vukas	25	GK	5'8"	Freshman	Pittsburgh, Pennsylvania	Transferred to Bowling Green
Kelly Moss	26	MF	5'5"	Senior	Lumberton, New Jersey	Graduated
Hannah Knych	27	MF	5'4"	Sophomore	Manlius, New York	Transferred to Binghamton
Emily Harrigan	29	FW	5'7"	(redshirt) Junior	North Huntingdon, Pennsylvania	Graduated
Katelyn Kauffman	30	FW	5'6"	Freshman	North Huntingdon, Pennsylvania	Transferred to Florida Gulf Coast
Sara Darlington	31	FW	5'5"	Freshman	West Chester, Pennsylvania	Transferred to Pennsylvania College of Technology

=== Incoming transfers ===
Incoming transfers
Name	Number	Pos.	Height	Year	Hometown	Previous school
Samiah Phiri	23	FW	5'6"	Sophomore	Irving, Texas	Oklahoma State
Keera Melenhorst	29	MF	5'3"	Sophomore	Ottawa, Canada	Oklahoma

=== Recruiting class ===
Name	Nationality	Hometown	Club	TDS Rating
Ellie Breech; GK	(United States)	Mechanicsburg, Pennsylvania	PA Classics	4/5 stars
Paige Califf; MF	(United States)	Orange, California	Slammers FC HB Koge	2/5 stars
Elizabeth Fleming Dean; MF	(United States)	Marietta, Georgia	United Futbol Academy	4/5 stars
Mackenzie Evers; FW	(United States)	Oakdale, Pennsylvania	Beadling SC	3/5 stars
Michaela Kasparcova; MF	(United States)	Collegeville, Pennsylvania	Penn Fusion SA	2/5 stars
Haylee Mersereau; DF	(United States)	Boca Raton, Florida	Weston FC	3/5 stars
Margaret Wilde; FW	(United States)	Lower Gwynedd, Pennsylvania	Penn Fusion SA	3/5 stars
Kathleen Zailski; DF	(United States)	Summerville, South Carolina	GSA	N/A

== Squad ==
=== Roster ===
As of September 22, 2022

Note: Flags indicate national team as defined under FIFA eligibility rules; some limited exceptions apply. Players may hold more than one non-FIFA nationality.

No.	Pos.	Nation	Player
0	GK	USA	Ellie Breech
1	GK	USA	Caitlyn Lazzarini
2	DF	USA	Haylee Mersereau
3	MF	USA	Mackenzie Edwards
4	MF	USA	Ellie Coffield
5	FW	USA	Sarah Schupansky
6	MF	USA	Landy Mertz
7	MF	USA	Fleming Dean
8	FW	CAN	Leah Pais
9	FW	CAN	Amanda West
10	MF	USA	Emily Yaple
11	DF	USA	Hailey Davidson
12	MF	CAN	Anna Bout
13	DF	USA	Ashley Moon
14	MF	USA	Bri Hilsenteger
15	MF	CAN	Chloe Minas
16	MF	USA	Haley Schmidt

No.	Pos.	Nation	Player
17	DF	MEX	Athalie Palomo
18	MF	USA	Elena Hinkson
19	MF	USA	Paige Califf
20	MF	USA	Maddie Keister
21	DF	USA	Katie Zailski
22	MF	USA	Krystyna Rytel
23	FW	USA	Samiah Phiri
26	FW	USA	Margaret Wilde
27	MF	USA	Briana Rodriguez
28	FW	USA	Mackenzie Evers
29	MF	USA	Keera Melenhorst
30	DF	USA	Keely Brown
31	MF	USA	Misa Kasparcova
32	DF	USA	Ashton Gordon
33	GK	USA	Gabriella Neibart
35	FW	CAN	Chantelle Parker

=== Team management ===
Position	Staff
Head coach	Randy Waldrum
Associate Head Coach	Ben Waldrum
Assistant Coach	Dustin Stein

== Schedule ==
Date Time, TV	Rank^{#}	Opponent^{#}	Result	Record	Site (Attendance) City, State
Non-conference regular season
August 18*; 3:00 p.m., ESPN+		vs. Gonzaga	W 1–0	1–0–0	South Campus Stadium (104); Missoula, MT
August 21*; 6:00 p.m., ESPN+		at Montana	W 2–0	2–0–0	South Campus Stadium (545); Missoula, MT
August 25*; 5:00 p.m., ACCNX		UMass	W 6–1	3–0–0	Ambrose Urbanic Field (721); Pittsburgh, PA
August 28*; 1:00 p.m., ESPN+		at Cleveland State	W 4–0	4–0–0	Krenzler Field (400); Cleveland, Ohio
August 31*; 7:00 p.m., ACCNX		Kent State	W 7–0	5–0–0	Ambrose Urbanic Field (522); Pittsburgh, PA
September 4*; 1:00 p.m., ACCNX		Cincinnati	W 2–0	6–0–0	Ambrose Urbanic Field (522); Pittsburgh, PA
September 8*; 7:00 p.m., ESPN+		at VCU	L 2–3	6–1–0	Sports Backers Stadium (298); Richmond, VA
September 11*; 1:00 p.m., ACCNX		Liberty	W 3–2	7–1–0	Ambrose Urbanic Field (546); Pittsburgh, PA
ACC Regular season
September 16; 5:00 p.m., ACCNX		at Virginia Tech	W 4–1	8–1–0 (1–0–0)	Thompson Field (708); Blacksburg, VA
September 22; 6:00 p.m., ACCN		Miami (FL)	W 3–1	9–1–0 (2–0–0)	Ambrose Urbanic Field (505); Pittsburgh, PA
September 25; 1:00 p.m., ACCNX		at No. 18 Notre Dame	W 3–1	10–1–0 (3–0–0)	Alumni Stadium (395); Notre Dame, IN
October 1; 7:00 p.m., ACCNX	No. 14	Louisville	W 1–0	11–1–0 (4–0–0)	Ambrose Urbanic Field (409); Pittsburgh, PA
October 6; 7:00 p.m., ACCNX	No. 13	at No. 5 North Carolina	L 0–4	11–2–0 (4–1–0)	Dorrance Field (2,602); Chapel Hill, NC
October 9; 1:00 p.m., ACCNX	No. 13	at No. 7 Duke	L 0–1	11–3–0 (4–2–0)	Koskinen Stadium (645); Durham, NC
October 15; 7:00 p.m., ACCNX	No. 21	at Boston College	T 1–1	11–3–1 (4–2–1)	Newton Campus Soccer Field (642); Chestnut Hill, MA
October 20; 6:00 p.m., ACCN	No. 20	Syracuse	W 2–0	12–3–1 (5–2–1)	Ambrose Urbanic Field (908); Pittsburgh, PA
October 23; 1:00 p.m., ACCNX	No. 20	No. 4 Florida State	L 0–1	12–4–1 (5–3–1)	Ambrose Urbanic Field (832); Pittsburgh, PA
October 27; 7:00 p.m., ACCNX	No. 19	Clemson	T 0–0	12–4–2 (5–3–2)	Ambrose Urbanic Field (723); Pittsburgh, PA
ACC tournament
October 30; 6:00 p.m., ACCN	(6) No. 19	at (3) No. 4 Notre Dame; First Round	T 1–1 (4–5 PKs) ^{2OT}	12–4–3	Alumni Stadium (428); Notre Dame, IN
NCAA tournament
November 12; 7:00 p.m., ESPN+	(4) No. 19	Buffalo; First Round	W 1–0	13–4–3	Ambrose Urbanic Field (994); Pittsburgh, PA
November 18; 2:00 p.m., ESPN+	(4) No. 19	vs. (5) No. 18 Georgetown; Second Round	W 2–1	14–4–3	Seminole Soccer Complex (1,668); Tallahassee, FL
November 20; 5:00 p.m., ESPN+	(4) No. 19	at (1) No. 5 Florida State; Round of 16	L 0–3	14–5–3	Seminole Soccer Complex (1,238); Tallahassee, FL
*Non-conference game. ^{#}Rankings from United Soccer Coaches. (#) Tournament seedings in parentheses. All times are in Eastern.

== Awards and honors ==
Recipient	Award	Date	Ref.
Amanda West	ACC Offensive Player of the Week	August 23	
Caitlyn Lazzarini	ACC Defensive Player of the Week	November 1	
Landy Mertz	All-ACC Third Team	November 2	
Katie Zailski	ACC All-Freshman Team	November 2	

== Rankings ==
Ranking movements Legend: ██ Increase in ranking ██ Decrease in ranking — = Not ranked
	Week																
Poll	Pre	1	2	3	4	5	6	7	8	9	10	11	12	13	14	15	Final
United Soccer	—	—	—	—	—	—	14	13	21	20	19	19	Not released				12
TopDrawer Soccer	—	—	—	—	—	—	14	10	15	19	19	20	25	22	20	20	20
