= 2022 Syracuse Orange women's soccer team =

American college soccer season

2022 Syracuse Orange women's soccer
- Conference: Atlantic Coast Conference
- Record: 8–7–3 (1–6–3 ACC)
- Head coach: Nicky Adams (4th season)
- Assistant coaches: Kelly Madsen (4th season); Brandon Denoyer (3rd season)
- Home stadium: SU Soccer Stadium

2022 ACC women's soccer standings
| | Conf. | | | | | | Overall |
| Team | W | | L | | T | PCT | W | | L | | T | PCT |
|---|---|---|---|---|---|---|---|---|---|---|---|---|
| No. 2 North Carolina ‍†‍‍^{y} | 8 | – | 2 | – | 0 | .800 | 20 | – | 5 | – | 1 | .788 |
| No. 3 Florida State ‍†‍‡‍^{y} | 8 | – | 2 | – | 0 | .800 | 17 | – | 3 | – | 3 | .804 |
| No. 5 Notre Dame ‍‍‍^{y} | 7 | – | 2 | – | 1 | .750 | 17 | – | 3 | – | 3 | .804 |
| No. 7 Virginia ‍‍‍^{y} | 6 | – | 2 | – | 2 | .700 | 16 | – | 4 | – | 3 | .761 |
| No. 6 Duke ‍‍‍^{y} | 6 | – | 2 | – | 2 | .700 | 15 | – | 5 | – | 3 | .717 |
| No. 12 Pittsburgh ‍‍‍^{y} | 5 | – | 3 | – | 2 | .600 | 14 | – | 5 | – | 3 | .705 |
| Clemson ‍‍‍^{y} | 4 | – | 3 | – | 3 | .550 | 8 | – | 5 | – | 5 | .583 |
| Virginia Tech ‍‍‍^{y} | 4 | – | 5 | – | 1 | .450 | 10 | – | 7 | – | 2 | .579 |
| Wake Forest ‍‍‍^{y} | 3 | – | 6 | – | 1 | .350 | 9 | – | 7 | – | 3 | .553 |
| Louisville ‍‍‍ | 3 | – | 7 | – | 0 | .300 | 6 | – | 8 | – | 2 | .438 |
| NC State ‍‍‍^{y} | 2 | – | 6 | – | 2 | .300 | 7 | – | 7 | – | 6 | .500 |
| Miami (FL) ‍‍‍ | 2 | – | 7 | – | 1 | .250 | 5 | – | 8 | – | 3 | .406 |
| Syracuse ‍‍‍ | 1 | – | 6 | – | 3 | .250 | 8 | – | 7 | – | 3 | .528 |
| Boston College ‍‍‍ | 1 | – | 7 | – | 2 | .200 | 5 | – | 8 | – | 5 | .417 |
† – Conference champion ‡ – 2022 ACC Tournament champion y – Invited to the NCAA Tournament; Source: The ACC; As of December 6, 2022; Rankings from United Soccer Coaches Poll

The 2022 Syracuse Orange women's soccer team represented Syracuse University during the 2022 NCAA Division I women's soccer season. The Orange were led by head coach Nicky Adams, in her fourth season. They played home games at SU Soccer Stadium. This was the team's 26th season playing organized women's college soccer, and their 9th playing in the Atlantic Coast Conference.

The Orange finished the season 8–7–3, 1–6–3 in ACC play to finish thirteenth place. They did not qualify for the ACC Tournament. They were not invited to the NCAA Tournament.

== Previous season ==
The Orange finished the season 4–12–1, 0–10–0 in ACC play to finish in fourteenth place. They did not qualify for the ACC Tournament. They were not invited to the NCAA Tournament.

== Offseason ==
=== Departures ===
Departures
| Name | Number | Pos. | Height | Year | Hometown | Reason for departure |
|---|---|---|---|---|---|---|
| Alina Miagkova | 5 | DF | 5'5" | Senior | Lipetsk, Russia | Graduated |
| Telly Vunipola | 12 | MF | 5'5" | Senior | Chino, California | Graduated |
| Natalie Weidenbach | 15 | DF | 5'4" | Graduate Student | North Bend, Washington | Graduated |
| Lysianne Proulx | 22 | GK | 5'7" | Graduate Student | Montreal, Canada | Graduated |
| Chloe Deveze | 23 | MF | 5'7" | Sophomore | San Clemente, California | N/A |
| Meghan Root | 24 | FW | 5'5" | Senior | Arcade, New York | Graduated |

=== Incoming transfers ===
Incoming transfers
| Name | Number | Pos. | Height | Year | Hometown | Previous school |
|---|---|---|---|---|---|---|
| Florence Vaillancourt | 23 | FW | 5'9" | Senior | Quebec City, Canada | Niagara |

=== Recruiting class ===
| Name | Nationality | Hometown | Club | TDS Rating |
|---|---|---|---|---|
| Alyssa Abramson; MF | (United States) | Medford, New York | SUSA FC Academy | 2/5 stars |
| Rebekah Doolittle; DF | (United States) | Beaverdam, Virginia | Richmond United | 2/5 stars |
| Maya McDermott; FW | (United States) | Harleysville, Pennsylvania | FC Bucks | 2/5 stars |
| Anna Rupert; FW | (United States) | Arlington, Virginia | Arlington SA | 2/5 stars |
| Gianna Savella; MF | (United States) | Massapequa Park, New York | SUSA FC Academy | 2/5 stars |
| Aleena Ulke; DF | (United States) | Moon Township, Pennsylvania | Pittsburgh Riverhounds | N/A |
| Shealyn Vanderbosch; GK | (United States) | Lancaster, New York | WNY Flash | N/A |

== Squad ==
=== Roster ===
As of December 2, 2022

Note: Flags indicate national team as defined under FIFA eligibility rules; some limited exceptions apply. Players may hold more than one non-FIFA nationality.

| No. | Pos. | Nation | Player |
|---|---|---|---|
| 0 | GK | USA | Michaela Walsh |
| 1 | GK | CAN | Sierra Giorgio |
| 2 | MF | USA | Liesel Odden |
| 3 | MF | USA | Margaret Thornton |
| 4 | FW | USA | Ashley Rauch |
| 5 | DF | USA | Alyssa Abramson |
| 6 | MF | GER | Pauline Machtens |
| 7 | FW | USA | Blue Ellis |
| 8 | DF | BEL | Zoe van de Cloot |
| 9 | DF | USA | Kendyl Lauher |
| 10 | FW | NZL | Hannah Pilley |
| 11 | DF | USA | Jenna Tivnan |
| 12 | DF | USA | Aleena Ulke |
| 13 | FW | USA | Anna Rupert |
| 14 | DF | USA | Kate Murphy |

| No. | Pos. | Nation | Player |
|---|---|---|---|
| 15 | FW | USA | Maya McDermott |
| 16 | MF | USA | Koby Commandant |
| 17 | DF | CAN | Kylen Grant |
| 18 | FW | USA | Aysia Cobb |
| 19 | FW | USA | Raia James |
| 20 | DF | USA | Emma Klein |
| 21 | FW | USA | Chelsea Domond |
| 22 | MF | USA | Gianna Savella |
| 23 | FW | CAN | Florence Vaillancourt |
| 24 | DF | USA | Rebekkah Doolittle |
| 25 | DF | USA | Grace Franklin |
| 26 | FW | USA | Erin Flurey |
| 27 | DF | ENG | Grace Gillard |
| 30 | GK | USA | Shea Vanderbosch |

=== Team management ===
| Position | Staff |
|---|---|
| Head coach | Nicky Adams |
| Assistant coach | Kelly Madsen |
| Assistant coach | Brandon Denoyer |

== Schedule ==
| Date Time, TV | Rank^{#} | Opponent^{#} | Result | Record | Site (Attendance) City, State |
Exhibition
| August 11*; 6:00 p.m. | | at Army | None Reported | – | Malek Stadium; West Point, NY |
| August 14*; 7:00 p.m. | | Niagara | None Reported | – | SU Soccer Stadium; Syracuse, NY |
Non-conference regular season
| August 18*; 7:00 p.m., ACCNX | | New Hampshire | W 2–1 | 1–0–0 | SU Soccer Stadium (277); Syracuse, NY |
| August 21*; 1:00 p.m., ACCNX | | Connecticut | L 0–6 | 1–1–0 | SU Soccer Stadium; Syracuse, NY |
| August 25*; 8:00 p.m., ACCNX | | Lafayette | W 4–1 | 2–1–0 | SU Soccer Stadium (197); Syracuse, NY |
| August 28*; 1:00 p.m., ACCNX | | Siena | W 2–0 | 3–1–0 | SU Soccer Stadium (276); Syracuse, NY |
| September 1*; 5:00 p.m. | | at Eastern Michigan | W 2–0 | 4–1–0 | Sloan Field (115); Brighton, MI |
| September 4*; 5:00 p.m., ACCNX | | Merrimack | W 2–1 | 5–1–0 | SU Soccer Stadium (328); Syracuse, NY |
| September 8*; 7:00 p.m., ACCNX | | Binghamton | W 2–1 | 6–1–0 | Bearcats Sports Complex (277); Vestal, NY |
| September 11*; 3:30 p.m., ACCNX | | Cornell | W 3–0 | 7–1–0 | SU Soccer Stadium (118); Syracuse, NY |
ACC regular season
| September 16; 7:00 p.m., ACCNX | | No. 3 Duke | L 0–1 | 7–2–0 (0–1–0) | SU Soccer Stadium (637); Syracuse, NY |
| September 22; 7:00 p.m., ACCNX | | No. 3 North Carolina | L 0–1 | 7–3–0 (0–2–0) | SU Soccer Stadium (143); Syracuse, NY |
| September 25; 1:00 p.m., ACCNX | | Miami (FL) | W 3–1 | 8–3–0 (1–2–0) | SU Soccer Stadium (96); Syracuse, NY |
| October 2; 12:00 p.m., ACCN | | at Wake Forest | L 0–2 | 8–4–0 (1–3–0) | Spry Stadium (371); Winston-Salem, NC |
| October 6; 5:30 p.m., ACCNX | | at Boston College | L 0–1 | 8–5–0 (1–4–0) | Newton Campus Soccer Field (298); Chestnut Hill, MA |
| October 9; 2:00 p.m., ACCNX | | at No. 2 Virginia | T 2–2 | 8–5–1 (1–4–1) | Klöckner Stadium (1,795); Charlottesville, VA |
| October 14; 7:00 p.m., ACCNX | | Clemson | T 1–1 | 8–5–2 (1–4–2) | SU Soccer Stadium (273); Syracuse, NY |
| October 20; 6:00 p.m., ACCN | | at No. 20 Pittsburgh | L 0–2 | 8–6–2 (1–5–2) | Ambrose Urbanic Field (908); Pittsburgh, PA |
| October 23; 1:00 p.m., ACCNX | | at Virginia Tech | L 0–2 | 8–7–2 (1–6–2) | Thompson Field (521); Blacksburg, VA |
| October 27; 7:00 p.m., ACCNX | | NC State | T 1–1 | 8–7–3 (1–6–3) | SU Soccer Stadium (162); Syracuse, NY |
*Non-conference game. ^{#}Rankings from United Soccer Coaches. (#) Tournament seedings in parentheses.

== Awards and honors ==
| Recipient | Award | Date | Ref. |
|---|---|---|---|
| Shea Vanderbosch | ACC All-Freshman Team | November 2 | |

== Rankings ==
Ranking movements Legend: — = Not ranked
| | Week | | | | | | | | | | | | | | | | |
| Poll | Pre | 1 | 2 | 3 | 4 | 5 | 6 | 7 | 8 | 9 | 10 | 11 | 12 | 13 | 14 | 15 | Final |
|---|---|---|---|---|---|---|---|---|---|---|---|---|---|---|---|---|---|
| United Soccer | — | — | — | — | — | — | — | — | — | — | — | — | Not released | | | | — |
| TopDrawer Soccer | — | — | — | — | — | — | — | — | — | — | — | — | — | — | — | — | — |
