= Korbin Shrader =

American soccer player (born 2003)

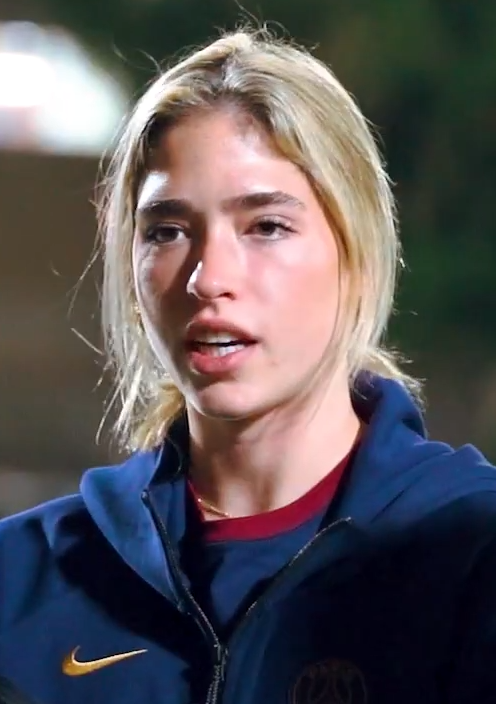
- Shrader in 2024

Personal information
- Full name: Korbin Rose Shrader
- Birth name: Korbin Rose Albert
- Date of birth: October 13, 2003 (age 23)
- Place of birth: Grayslake, Illinois, United States
- Height: 5 ft 7 in (1.70 m)
- Position: Midfielder

Youth career
- 2014–2021: Eclipse Select

College career
Years	Team	Apps	(Gls)
2021–2022	Notre Dame Fighting Irish	44	(28)

Senior career*
Years	Team	Apps	(Gls)
2019	Milwaukee Torrent	6	
2021	Chicago Red Stars Reserves		(3)
2022	Cleveland Ambassadors		(3)
2023–2025	Paris Saint-Germain	43	(5)
2025–	Lyon	18	(8)

International career^{‡}
2017–2019	United States U15		
2019	United States U17		
2022	United States U20	6	(1)
2025–	United States U23	2	(1)
2023–	United States	26	(1)
Medal record
Women's soccer
Representing the United States
Olympic Games
Gold medal – first place	2024 Paris	Team
CONCACAF W Gold Cup
Winner	2024 United States
- * Club domestic league appearances and goals as of May 29, 2026 ‡ National team caps and goals as of June 2, 2025

Korbin Rose Shrader (née Albert; born October 13, 2003) is an American professional soccer player who plays as a midfielder for OL Lyonnes and the United States national team.

Shrader played collegiately for the Notre Dame Fighting Irish, where she was a first-team All-American as a sophomore in 2023. She then signed with Paris Saint-Germain.

Shrader played for the national under-20 team before making her senior international debut in 2023. She won the gold medal with the national team at the 2024 Paris Olympics.

== Early life ==
Shrader was born in Grayslake, Illinois, a suburb of Chicago, and rose to prominence amongst the USYNT player pool while playing for Eclipse Select Soccer Club and the summer of 2019 with WPSL club FC Milwaukee Torrent. During this time period, she represented the US's youth national set-up at various age groupings and was also named the player of the season for Eclipse's league in her area twice (2018–19 and 2020–21).

== College career ==
Shrader reclassified and joined the University of Notre Dame a year early in 2021. During two seasons with the university, she received a number of individual honors for her performance. For the 2021 season, she was named as part of the nationwide freshmen Best XI while also being named third-team All-Atlantic Coast Conference (ACC).

In her second and final season in 2022, Shrader was a first-team All-American and All-ACC selection. She was also named the ACC's Midfielder of the Year and was a finalist for the Hermann Trophy given to the best collegiate player in the country. She scored three times in four knockout stage matches of the 2022 NCAA Tournament, but her team were eliminated by conference rivals North Carolina at the quarterfinal stage.

== Club career ==
=== Paris Saint-Germain (2023–2025) ===
On January 31, 2023, Shrader officially gave up her final two years of eligibility with Notre Dame to sign for Paris Saint-Germain on an initial two-and-a-half-year contract. She scored her first goal with her new club on December 20, 2023, in a UEFA Champions League game against AS Roma.

=== OL Lyonnes ===
On 4 July 2025, Shrader officially joined OL Lyonnes on a free transfer from Paris Saint-Germain. She signed a three-year contract running through June 2028. On 27 September 2025, she scored a 15-minute hat-trick and assisted Lindsey Heaps on her home debut versus her former club Paris Saint-Germain.

== International career ==
Shrader has been an American youth international at various different levels. In June 2022, she was part of the squad that represented the United States at the Sud Ladies Cup where the team were crowned champions. On July 25, 2022, she was named in the US' squad for the U-20 World Cup in Costa Rica. She started two matches at the tournament though the United States was eliminated in the group phase. In total, she made six appearances for the U-20 team.

In November 2023, Shrader received her first call-up to the senior national team, and made her international debut against China in a friendly on December 5, 2023. She earned her first start and second cap on February 20, 2024, against the Dominican Republic in a group stage match of the 2024 CONCACAF W Gold Cup.

Shrader was selected to the 18-player roster for the 2024 Summer Olympics in France. She scored her first international goal to help defeat Australia 2–1 in the third Olympic group stage game on July 31. She started in the gold medal game against Brazil, which the United States won 1–0 on a goal from Mallory Swanson assisted on a through pass from Shrader.

== Social media controversy ==
In March 2024, Shrader liked and re-posted several anti-LGBTQ+ social media posts, including a video of a sermon on TikTok that said being gay or "feeling transgender" was "wrong". Her social media history also revealed she had liked a meme celebrating Megan Rapinoe's injury in the 2023 NWSL final. Shrader later posted an apology for her activity on social media on her Instagram account. Several past and present United States women's national soccer team players, including the team's captain, Lindsey Horan, and Alex Morgan, criticised Shrader over the incident.

== Personal life ==
Shrader married Indianapolis Colts kicker Spencer Shrader in July 2025, and subsequently began using her married name.

== Career statistics ==
=== Club ===
As of match played May 29, 2026

Appearances and goals by club, season and competition
Club	Season	League			National Cup (Note: Includes Coupe de France)		League Cup (Note: Includes Coupe LFFP)		Playoffs (Note: Includes Première Ligue Playoffs)		Continental (Note: Includes UEFA Women's Champions League)		Other (Note: Includes Trophée des Championnes)		Total	
Club	Season	Division	Apps	Goals	Apps	Goals	Apps	Goals	Apps	Goals	Apps	Goals	Apps	Goals	Apps	Goals
Paris Saint-Germain	2022–23	Première Ligue	7	0	2	0	—		—		1	0	—		10	0
Paris Saint-Germain	2023–24	Première Ligue	17	1	3	0	—		2	0	12	2	0	0	34	3
Paris Saint-Germain	2024–25	Première Ligue	19	4	5	4	—		2	1	2	0	—		28	9
Lyon	2025–26	Première Ligue	17	7	4	2	1	0	2	0	10	1	—		34	10
Career total			60	12	14	6	1	0	6	1	25	3	0	0	106	22

=== International ===
As of match played April 8, 2025

Appearances and goals by national team and year
National team	Year	Apps	Goals
United States	2023	1	0
United States	2024	21	1
United States	2025	4	0
Total		26	1

Scores and results list the United States' goal tally first, score column indicates score after each Shrader goal.

List of international goals scored by Korbin Shrader
No.	Date	Venue	Opponent	Score	Result	Competition	Ref.
1	July 31, 2024	Marseille, France	Australia	2–0	2–1	2024 Summer Olympics	

== Honors ==
Paris Saint-Germain

- Coupe de France: 2023–24

OL Lyonnes

- Coupe de France: 2025–2026

United States

- Summer Olympic Games Gold Medal: 2024
- CONCACAF W Gold Cup: 2024
- SheBelieves Cup: 2024

Individual

- Hermann Trophy Finalist: 2022
- ACC Midfielder of the Year: 2022
- NCAA Division I First-Team All-America: 2022
- All-ACC: 2021 (3rd Team), 2022 (1st Team),
- ECNL Player of the Year: 2018–19, 2020–21
