= Waniya Hudson =

American soccer player (born 2001)

Personal information
- Full name: Waniya LaRyn Hudson
- Date of birth: June 2, 2001 (age 25)
- Place of birth: Rochester, New York, United States
- Height: 5 ft 7 in (1.70 m)
- Position: Defender

Team information
- Current team: Kristianstad
- Number: 23

College career
Years	Team	Apps	(Gls)
2019–2023	Notre Dame Fighting Irish	96	(0)

Senior career*
Years	Team	Apps	(Gls)
2024	Washington Spirit	0	(0)
2024	→ Dallas Trinity (loan)	9	(0)
2025–	Kristianstad	9	(0)
- * Club domestic league appearances and goals as of November 16, 2025

Waniya LaRyn Hudson (born June 2, 2001) is an American professional soccer player who plays as a defender for Damallsvenskan club Kristianstad. She played college soccer for the Notre Dame Fighting Irish. She is the older sister of fellow soccer player Wrianna Hudson.

== Early life ==
Hudson grew up in Greece, New York, a suburb of Rochester. She took after her older sister and began playing soccer when she was seven or eight,. She attended Greece Athena High School, where she captained the soccer team and was twice named all-state, and she also lettered in track. She played club soccer for the Super 9 boys' team, where she wore the 20 jersey like Abby Wambach, a Rochester native who also played on a boys' team. She captained her state Olympic Development Program team and played for the regional ODP squad. She committed to the University of Notre Dame during her junior year in 2017.

== College career ==
Hudson made 96 appearances for the Notre Dame Fighting Irish from 2019 to 2023, starting every game from her sophomore year onwards. She and teammates Eva Gaetino and Leah Klenke formed an Irish defense that was statistically among the best in the country in 2022, keeping clean sheets through the first three rounds of the NCAA tournament before falling in the quarterfinals. She played a team high in minutes in her senior and graduate seasons.

== Club career ==
Hudson trained with NWSL club NJ/NY Gotham FC in the 2024 preseason before signing a one-year contract with the Washington Spirit on May 22, 2024. On September 23, the Spirit announced that she would join USL Super League club Dallas Trinity on loan for the rest of the year. She made her professional debut on October 6, playing the full 90 minutes in a 2–1 win over the Spokane Zephyr. Her contract expired while she remained on loan on December 31.

Swedish club Kristianstad announced that they had signed Hudson on September 5, 2025. She made her club debut eight days later as a late substitute in a 2–1 win over Växjö.

== Personal life ==
Hudson is the daughter of Woodruff and Wanda Hudson and has three siblings, all of whom played college sports. Her father played college basketball at RIT, and her mother ran track at Nazareth. Her older brother, Woody, played ice hockey at St. Lawrence; her older sister, Winsom, played soccer at Buffalo State; and her younger sister, Wrianna, plays soccer for Florida State.
