= 2022 NCAA Division I women's soccer season =

American college soccer season

- Number of teams: 348
- Preseason No. 1: Florida State
- Hermann Trophy: Michelle Cooper, Duke
- Top goalscorer: Rebecca Cooke, Quinnipiac – 22 goals

Statistics
- Biggest home win: 21 goals: Gardner-Webb 21–0 Allen University (September 16)
- Biggest away win: 10 goals: MS Valley State 0–10 Southern Utah (August 19)
- Highest scoring: 21 goals: Gardner-Webb 21–0 Allen University (September 16)
- Longest winning run: 18 games, Saint Louis (August 25, 2022 – November 12, 2022)
- Longest unbeaten run: 20 games, Florida State (October 24, 2021 – October 6, 2022)
- Longest winless run: 40 games Mississippi Valley State (September 6, 2019 – Present)
- Longest losing run: 37 games Mississippi Valley State (September 6, 2019 – October 21, 2022)

Tournament
- Duration: November 11 – December 5, 2022
- Most conference bids: ACC – 10 bids

College Cup
- Date: December 5, 2022
- Site: WakeMed Soccer Park; Cary, North Carolina
- Champions: UCLA
- Runners-up: North Carolina

Seasons
- ← 2021 2023 →

The 2022 NCAA Division I women's soccer season was the 41st season of NCAA championship women's college soccer.

The season began on August 18, 2022, and concluded on November 6, 2022. It culminated with the 2022 NCAA Division I women's soccer tournament, with the College Cup being held at WakeMed Soccer Park in Cary, North Carolina.

Florida State were the defending NCAA Champions.

== Changes from 2021 ==
=== Rule changes ===
In April 2022, during a meeting among the NCAA Playing Rules Oversight Panel (PROP), several major rule changes were enacted. This included overtime, expansion of video assistant referee (VAR), and the appeals process of a suspension.

Specifically overtime was abolished during the regular season. Matches that ended in a draw during a conference or national tournament match would involve two, ten minute periods, without a golden goal. A playoff game tied after two overtime periods would still move to a penalty kick shoot-out with the winner determined by the teams alternating kicks from the penalty mark. Additionally PROP approved VAR to be used for fouls that occurred outside of the penalty area, as well as allowing a 48-hour period to appeal a red card decision.

=== Coaching changes ===
So far, there have been 55 coaching changes during the 2021–22 offseason.

Program	Outgoing coach	Manner of departure	Date of vacancy	Incoming coach	Date of appointment	References
Air Force	Larry Friend	Retirement	November 22, 2021	Laura Busby	February 21, 2022	
Albany	Leigh Howard	Pursue opportunity with Special Olympics	January 13, 2022	Sade Ayinde	February 16, 2022	
Appalachian State	Sarah Strickland	Fired	November 9, 2021	Aimee Haywood	December 16, 2021	
Austin Peay	Naomi Kolarova	Resigned	October 26, 2021	Kim McGowan	December 13, 2021	
Baylor	Paul Jobson	Resigned	November 16, 2021	Michelle Lenard	December 11, 2021	
Bellarmine	Chris Tinius	Resigned	November 4, 2021	Paul Babba	January 4, 2022	
Boston University	Nancy Feldman	Retired	April 11, 2022	Casey Brown	June 3, 2022	
Campbell	Samar Azem	Hired as head coach at Villanova	December 6, 2021	Jeff Gross	January 24, 2022	
Charlotte	John Cullen	Resigned	March 15, 2022	Brandi Fontaine	May 19, 2022	
Chicago State	Cristiano Costa	Fired	December 1, 2021	Mario Felix	March 1, 2022	
Colorado College	Geoff Bennett	Resigned	November 24, 2021	Keri Sanchez	December 27, 2021	
East Carolina	Jason Hamilton	Resigned	February 10, 2022	Gary Higgins	March 8, 2022	
Florida	Tony Amato	Fired	April 27, 2022	Samantha Bohon	May 16, 2022	
Florida State	Mark Krikorian	Resigned	March 29, 2022	Brian Pensky	April 25, 2022	
Fordham	Jessica Clinton	Resigned	November 17, 2021	Magnus Nilerud	February 11, 2022	
Georgia	Billy Lesense	Fired	November 9, 2021	Keidane McAlpine	November 30, 2021	
Grambling State	Craig Roberts	Hired as head coach at Southern Illinois	March 14, 2022	Justin Wagar	June 27, 2022	
Green Bay	Jason Spain	Resigned	November 5, 2021	Julie Grutzner	December 22, 2021	
High Point	Brandi Fontaine	Hired as head coach at Charlotte	May 19, 2022	Aaron McGuiness	July 7, 2022	
Holy Cross	Kyle Bak	Resigned	March 14, 2022	Ben Graham	May 3, 2022	
Houston	Diego Bocanegra	Retired	January 12, 2022	Jaime Frias	February 16, 2022	
Idaho State	Debs Brereton	Fired	October 27, 2021	Dustin Downey	January 3, 2022	
Illinois State	Brad Silvey	Resigned	April 25, 2022	Marisa Kresge	May 23, 2022	
Kentucky	Ian Carry	Fired	October 15, 2021	Troy Fabiano	November 30, 2021	
Lamar	Steve Holeman	Hired as head coach of Texas State	February 9, 2022	Nathan Kogut	April 20, 2022	
Lehigh	Eric Lambinus	Resigned	January 25, 2022	Lauren Calabrese	January 25, 2022	
Little Rock	Mark Foster	Hired as head coach at UTRGV	March 18, 2022	Kelly Farrell	May 10, 2022	
Louisiana	Lance Key	Hired as head coach at Hardin–Simmons	January 26, 2022	Chris McBride	February 24, 2022	
Loyola Marymount	Jenny Bindon	Fired	November 8, 2021	Chris Chamides	December 22, 2021	
Maryland	Ray Leone	Contract not renewed	October 26, 2021	Megan Ryan Nemzer	December 10, 2021	
Milwaukee	Troy Fabiano	Hired as head coach at Kentucky	November 30, 2021	Kevin Boyd	February 28, 2022	
Missouri State	Rob Brewer	Retired	October 28, 2021	Kirk Nelson	December 6, 2021	
Monmouth	Krissy Turner	Hired as head coach at Penn	June 24, 2022	Kylee Flynn	July 7, 2022	
Morehead State	Warren Lipka	Contract not renewed	November 4, 2021	Chris Fox	January 14, 2022	
Mount Saint Mary's	Tori Krause	None provided	December 2021	Melissa Sherwood	January 25, 2022	
Northern Illinois	Julie Colhoff	Fired	November 23, 2021	Michael O'Neill	March 14, 2022	
Oral Roberts	Roger Bush	Resigned	November 4, 2021	Austin Risenhoover	December 10, 2021	
Penn	Casey Brown	Hired as head coach at Boston University	June 3, 2022	Krissy Turner	June 24, 2022	
Prairie View A&M	Sonia Curvelo	Resigned	May 17, 2022	Christiane Lessa	August 11, 2022	
Saint Francis (PA)	Ellie Davis	Mutual Separation	November 8, 2021	Sara Yunez	January 12, 2022	
Sam Houston State	Tom Brown	Resigned	March 2, 2022	Sonia Curvelo	May 17, 2022	
San Jose State	Lauren Hanson	Resigned	February 6, 2022	Tina Estrada	April 8, 2022	
Seton Hall	Ciara Crinion	Resigned	June 13, 2022	Josh Osit	July 11, 2022	
SMU	Chris Petrucelli	Hired as head coach at Chicago Red Stars	February 18, 2022	Nicole Nelson	March 27, 2022	
Southeastern Louisiana	Chris McBride	Hired as head coach at Louisiana	February 24, 2022	Nathan Gillespie	March 18, 2022	
Southern Illinois	Grant Williams	Fired	November 10, 2021	Craig Roberts	March 15, 2022	
Tennessee	Brian Pensky	Hired as head coach at Florida State	April 25, 2022	Joe Kirt	April 29, 2022	
Texas State	Kat Conner	Resigned	November 18, 2021	Steve Holeman	February 9, 2022	
Troy	Nicole Waters (Interim)	Interim period expired	December 14, 2021	Robert Lane	December 14, 2021	
UCLA	Amanda Cromwell	Hired as head coach at Orlando Pride	December 3, 2021	Margueritte Aozasa	December 29, 2021	
USC	Keidane McAlpine	Hired as head coach at Georgia	November 30, 2021	Jane Alukonis	January 20, 2022	
USC Upstate	Tyson John	Contract not renewed	October 28, 2021	Sharif Saber	December 9, 2021	
UTRGV	Glad Bugariu	Resigned	March 2, 2022	Mark Foster	March 18, 2022	
Villanova	Chris McLain	Resigned	October 29, 2021	Samar Azem	December 6, 2021	
Western Illinois	Eric Johnson	Men's head coach only	February 15, 2022	Josée Primeau	February 15, 2022	
Western Michigan	Sammy Boateng	Hired as assistant coach at Michigan	May 26, 2022	Lewis Robinson	June 30, 2022	

=== New programs ===
Tarleton State University, already a new member of the Western Athletic Conference (WAC) on its first year of reclassification to NCAA Division I, announced on January 19, 2021, that it would add women's soccer starting this season.

=== Conference realignment ===
School	Previous conference	New conference
Austin Peay	OVC	ASUN
Belmont	OVC	MVC
Bryant	NEC	America East
Chicago State	WAC	Independent
Hampton	Big South	CAA
Hartford	America East	Independent
James Madison	CAA	Sun Belt
Lamar	WAC	Southland
Lindenwood	GLVC (NCAA D-II)	OVC
Little Rock	Sun Belt	OVC
Loyola Chicago	MVC	A-10
Marshall	C-USA	Sun Belt
Monmouth	MAAC	CAA
Mount St. Mary's	NEC	MAAC
Murray State	OVC	MVC
Old Dominion	C-USA	Sun Belt
Queens	SAC (NCAA D-II)	ASUN
Southern Indiana	GLVC (NCAA D-II)	OVC
Southern Miss	C-USA	Sun Belt
Southern Utah	Big Sky	WAC
Stonehill	NE-10 (NCAA D-II)	NEC
Stony Brook	America East	CAA
Texas A&M–Commerce	LSC (NCAA D-II)	Southland
UIC	Horizon	MVC

=== Other headlines ===
- August 12 – The Indiana University and Purdue University systems announced that Indiana University–Purdue University Indianapolis will be dissolved in 2024 and replaced by separate IU- and Purdue-affiliated institutions. The current athletic program, the IUPUI Jaguars, will transfer to the new IU Indianapolis.
- August 31 – The Division I Board of Directors adopted a series of changes to transfer rules.
  - Transfer windows were adopted for all Division I sports. Student-athletes who wish to be immediately eligible at their next school must enter the NCAA transfer portal within the designated period(s) for their sport. For women's soccer, two windows were established—a 45-day winter window starting the day after the NCAA tournament selections are announced, and a spring window from May 1–15.
  - Student-athletes who experience head coaching changes, or those whose athletic aid is reduced, canceled, or not renewed, may transfer outside designated windows without penalty.
  - Transferring student-athletes will be guaranteed their financial aid at their next school through graduation.
- September 21 – Houston Baptist University announced it had changed its name to Houston Christian University, effective immediately. The athletic nickname of Huskies was not affected.
- October 14 – Conference USA announced that ASUN Conference member Kennesaw State would join C-USA in 2024.

== Season outlook ==
=== Preseason polls ===
United Soccer Coaches
Rank	Team
1	Florida State
2	Duke
3	BYU
4	Virginia
5	Santa Clara
6	Rutgers
7	TCU
8	Arkansas
9	Michigan
10	North Carolina
11	Tennessee
12	South Carolina
13	UCLA
14	Penn State
15	USC
16	Notre Dame
17	Pepperdine
18	Ole Miss
19	Georgetown
20	Washington State
21	Stanford
22	Memphis
23	SMU
24	Xavier
25	Clemson

Top Drawer Soccer
Rank	Team
1	Florida State
2	Virginia
3	Tennessee
4	BYU
5	Duke
6	UCLA
7	Penn State
8	North Carolina
9	Arkansas
10	Rutgers
11	Santa Clara
12	TCU
13	Georgetown
14	South Carolina
15	Clemson
16	Notre Dame
17	Michigan
18	USC
19	Washington State
20	Stanford
21	Xavier
22	Pepperdine
23	NC State
24	Brown
25	Memphis

== Regular season ==
=== Major upsets ===
In this list, a "major upset" is defined as a game won by a team ranked 10 or more spots lower or an unranked team that defeats a team ranked No. 15 or higher.

All rankings are from the United Soccer Coaches Poll.

Date	Winner	Score	Loser
August 18	Saint Louis	1–0	No. 8 Arkansas
August 18	Purdue	3–0	No. 15 USC
August 21	UC Davis	1–0	No. 5 Santa Clara
August 21	Butler	1–0	No. 9 Michigan
September 1	USC	3–0	No. 6т TCU
September 1	Alabama	3–2	No. 6т BYU
September 8	Northwestern	1–0	No. 6т Stanford
September 10	Utah Valley	4–2	No. 13 BYU
September 15	No. 24 Clemson	2–0	No. 6 Notre Dame
September 16	Mississippi State	2–0	No. 14 Arkansas
September 22	No. 17 Penn State	2–0	No. 4 Rutgers
September 22	No. 18 Notre Dame	1–0	No. 2 Virginia
September 22	Wake Forest	4–1	No. 14 Clemson
September 23	Oregon	2–0	No. 15 Washington
September 25	No. 20 Arkansas	1–0	No. 8 South Carolina
September 29	Michigan State	2–1	No. 6 Penn State
September 30	Tennessee	1–0	No. 13 Ole Miss
October 1	Virginia Tech	2–1	No. 3 North Carolina
October 2	Ohio State	3–0	No. 6 Penn State
October 6	Arizona	1–0	No. 8 USC
October 9	No. 17 Notre Dame	4–0	No. 3 Florida State
October 15	BYU	4–1	No. 14 Portland
October 20	Iowa	2–1	No. 13 Northwestern
October 20	Michigan	3–2	No. 14 Rutgers
October 20	Oklahoma	2–1	No. 12 TCU
November 6	No. 21 Penn State	3–2	No. 6 Michigan State
November 12	Memphis	1–0	No. 10 Saint Louis
November 12	UC Irvine	2–0	No. 14 USC

=== Conference standings ===
2022 American Athletic Conference women's soccer standings
	Conf.						Overall
Team	W		L		T	PCT	W		L		T	PCT
No. 23т UCF ‍†‍‍^{y}	7	–	0	–	1	.938	9	–	2	–	7	.694
South Florida ‍‍‍	5	–	3	–	0	.625	8	–	9	–	0	.471
Cincinnati ‍‍‍	3	–	1	–	4	.625	7	–	3	–	7	.618
No. 21 Memphis ‍‍‡‍^{y}	3	–	2	–	3	.563	11	–	5	–	6	.636
East Carolina ‍‍‍	3	–	3	–	2	.500	8	–	8	–	3	.500
SMU ‍‍‍	3	–	3	–	2	.500	10	–	4	–	5	.658
Tulsa ‍‍‍	2	–	4	–	2	.375	7	–	7	–	3	.500
Houston ‍‍‍	2	–	4	–	2	.375	6	–	7	–	3	.469
Temple ‍‍‍	0	–	8	–	0	.000	1	–	11	–	4	.188
† – Conference champion ‡ – 2022 AAC Tournament champion y – Invited to the NCAA Tournament; As of December 6, 2022; Rankings from United Soccer Coaches Poll; Source:American Athletic Conference

2022 America East Conference women's soccer standings
	Conf.						Overall
Team	W		L		T	PCT	W		L		T	PCT
Binghamton ‍†‍‍	6	–	1	–	1	.813	9	–	5	–	5	.605
New Hampshire ‍‍‡‍^{y}	5	–	1	–	2	.750	9	–	6	–	3	.583
Maine ‍‍‍	4	–	0	–	4	.750	9	–	3	–	5	.676
UMass Lowell ‍‍‍	4	–	2	–	2	.625	7	–	7	–	4	.500
Albany ‍‍‍	3	–	2	–	3	.563	7	–	8	–	5	.475
NJIT ‍‍‍	2	–	4	–	2	.375	5	–	8	–	6	.421
UMBC ‍‍‍	1	–	5	–	2	.250	5	–	8	–	4	.412
Vermont ‍‍‍	0	–	5	–	3	.188	4	–	9	–	3	.344
Bryant ‍‍‍	0	–	5	–	3	.188	3	–	10	–	4	.294
† – Conference champion ‡ – 2022 America East Tournament champion y – Invited to the NCAA Tournament; As of December 6, 2022; Rankings from United Soccer Coaches Poll; Source:America East Conference

2022 Atlantic 10 Conference women's soccer standings
	Conf.						Overall
Team	W		L		T	PCT	W		L		T	PCT
No. 20 Saint Louis ‍†‍‡‍^{y}	10	–	0	–	0	1.000	20	–	2	–	0	.909
Dayton ‍‍‍	8	–	2	–	0	.800	16	–	4	–	1	.786
VCU ‍‍‍	6	–	1	–	3	.750	8	–	3	–	8	.632
Davidson ‍‍‍	5	–	2	–	3	.650	13	–	3	–	4	.750
Duquesne ‍‍‍	4	–	3	–	3	.550	6	–	7	–	3	.469
Saint Joseph's ‍‍‍	3	–	2	–	5	.550	5	–	8	–	7	.425
UMass ‍‍‍	4	–	4	–	2	.500	5	–	9	–	5	.395
Loyola-Chicago ‍‍‍	4	–	5	–	1	.450	8	–	8	–	3	.500
Fordham ‍‍‍	4	–	5	–	1	.450	5	–	11	–	1	.324
LaSalle ‍‍‍	3	–	6	–	1	.350	8	–	8	–	2	.500
George Washington ‍‍‍	2	–	5	–	3	.350	7	–	5	–	6	.556
Rhode Island ‍‍‍	2	–	5	–	3	.350	3	–	9	–	6	.333
Richmond ‍‍‍	2	–	5	–	3	.350	3	–	10	–	4	.294
George Mason ‍‍‍	0	–	5	–	5	.250	1	–	10	–	7	.250
St. Bonaventure ‍‍‍	1	–	8	–	1	.150	3	–	8	–	6	.353
† – Conference champion ‡ – 2022 Atlantic 10 Tournament champion y – Invited to the NCAA Tournament; As of December 6, 2022; Rankings from United Soccer Coaches Poll; Source:A10 Conference

2022 ASUN Conference women's soccer standings
	Conf.						Overall
Team	W		L		T	PCT	W		L		T	PCT
Liberty ‍†‍‍	8	–	0	–	2	.900	14	–	3	–	4	.762
Florida Gulf Coast ‍‍‡‍^{y}	8	–	1	–	1	.850	12	–	6	–	2	.650
Lipscomb ‍‍‍	8	–	1	–	1	.850	11	–	5	–	3	.658
Kennesaw St. ‍‍‍	5	–	3	–	2	.600	7	–	9	–	3	.447
Eastern Kentucky ‍‍‍	4	–	4	–	2	.500	9	–	7	–	2	.556
Central Arkansas ‍‍‍	4	–	4	–	2	.500	6	–	9	–	4	.421
North Florida ‍‍‍	3	–	3	–	4	.500	4	–	7	–	5	.406
Jacksonville ‍‍‍	3	–	4	–	3	.450	6	–	5	–	5	.531
Queens ‍‍‍	3	–	5	–	2	.400	3	–	8	–	5	.344
Stetson ‍‍‍	3	–	6	–	1	.350	6	–	11	–	1	.361
Bellarmine ‍‍‍	1	–	4	–	5	.350	1	–	7	–	9	.324
North Alabama ‍‍‍	2	–	6	–	2	.300	5	–	8	–	5	.417
Austin Peay ‍‍‍	1	–	6	–	3	.250	3	–	9	–	6	.333
Jacksonville State ‍‍‍	1	–	7	–	2	.200	3	–	13	–	2	.222
† – Conference champion ‡ – 2022 ASUN Tournament champion y – Invited to the NCAA Tournament; As of December 6, 2022; Rankings from United Soccer Coaches Poll; Source:Atlantic Sun Conference

2022 ACC women's soccer standings
	Conf.						Overall
Team	W		L		T	PCT	W		L		T	PCT
No. 2 North Carolina ‍†‍‍^{y}	8	–	2	–	0	.800	20	–	5	–	1	.788
No. 3 Florida State ‍†‍‡‍^{y}	8	–	2	–	0	.800	17	–	3	–	3	.804
No. 5 Notre Dame ‍‍‍^{y}	7	–	2	–	1	.750	17	–	3	–	3	.804
No. 7 Virginia ‍‍‍^{y}	6	–	2	–	2	.700	16	–	4	–	3	.761
No. 6 Duke ‍‍‍^{y}	6	–	2	–	2	.700	15	–	5	–	3	.717
No. 12 Pittsburgh ‍‍‍^{y}	5	–	3	–	2	.600	14	–	5	–	3	.705
Clemson ‍‍‍^{y}	4	–	3	–	3	.550	8	–	5	–	5	.583
Virginia Tech ‍‍‍^{y}	4	–	5	–	1	.450	10	–	7	–	2	.579
Wake Forest ‍‍‍^{y}	3	–	6	–	1	.350	9	–	7	–	3	.553
Louisville ‍‍‍	3	–	7	–	0	.300	6	–	8	–	2	.438
NC State ‍‍‍^{y}	2	–	6	–	2	.300	7	–	7	–	6	.500
Miami (FL) ‍‍‍	2	–	7	–	1	.250	5	–	8	–	3	.406
Syracuse ‍‍‍	1	–	6	–	3	.250	8	–	7	–	3	.528
Boston College ‍‍‍	1	–	7	–	2	.200	5	–	8	–	5	.417
† – Conference champion ‡ – 2022 ACC Tournament champion y – Invited to the NCAA Tournament; Source: The ACC; As of December 6, 2022; Rankings from United Soccer Coaches Poll

2022 Big East Conference women's soccer standings
	Conf.						Overall
Team	W		L		T	PCT	W		L		T	PCT
No. 19 Georgetown ‍†‍‡‍^{y}	8	–	0	–	2	.900	15	–	2	–	5	.795
Xavier ‍‍‍^{y}	6	–	0	–	4	.800	14	–	4	–	5	.717
St. John's ‍‍‍	4	–	2	–	3	.611	7	–	5	–	7	.553
Creighton ‍‍‍	4	–	3	–	3	.550	8	–	4	–	8	.600
Butler ‍‍‍	4	–	3	–	3	.550	7	–	7	–	5	.500
Connecticut ‍‍‍	4	–	4	–	2	.500	8	–	6	–	4	.556
Marquette ‍‍‍	3	–	4	–	3	.450	7	–	7	–	4	.500
Villanova ‍‍‍	3	–	5	–	2	.400	4	–	8	–	4	.375
Providence ‍‍‍	2	–	4	–	4	.400	4	–	9	–	5	.361
DePaul ‍‍‍	1	–	7	–	1	.167	3	–	12	–	1	.219
Seton Hall ‍‍‍	1	–	8	–	1	.150	5	–	10	–	3	.361
† – Conference champion ‡ – 2022 Big East Tournament champion y – Invited to the NCAA Tournament; As of December 6, 2022; Rankings from United Soccer Coaches Poll; Source:The Big East Conference

2022 Big Sky Conference women's soccer standings
	Conf.						Overall
Team	W		L		T	PCT	W		L		T	PCT
Northern Arizona ‍†‍‡‍^{y}	7	–	1	–	0	.875	8	–	6	–	6	.550
Idaho ‍‍‍	6	–	2	–	0	.750	12	–	3	–	3	.750
Portland St. ‍‍‍	4	–	2	–	2	.625	5	–	8	–	5	.417
Sacramento St. ‍‍‍	4	–	3	–	1	.563	4	–	9	–	5	.361
Weber St. ‍‍‍	4	–	4	–	0	.500	5	–	11	–	2	.333
Montana ‍‍‍	3	–	4	–	1	.438	7	–	7	–	6	.500
Eastern Washington ‍‍‍	2	–	3	–	3	.438	5	–	8	–	5	.417
Idaho St. ‍‍‍	2	–	6	–	0	.250	3	–	11	–	2	.250
Northern Colorado ‍‍‍	0	–	7	–	1	.063	4	–	11	–	3	.306
† – Conference champion ‡ – 2022 Big Sky Tournament champion y – Invited to the NCAA Tournament; As of December 6, 2022; Rankings from United Soccer Coaches Poll; Source:The Big Sky Conference

2022 Big South Conference women's soccer standings
	Conf.						Overall
Team	W		L		T	PCT	W		L		T	PCT
Campbell ‍†‍‍	7	–	0	–	2	.889	11	–	3	–	4	.722
Radford ‍‍‡‍^{y}	6	–	2	–	1	.722	12	–	4	–	4	.700
USC Upstate ‍‍‍	6	–	2	–	1	.722	9	–	5	–	4	.611
Gardner-Webb ‍‍‍	4	–	3	–	2	.556	9	–	7	–	5	.548
High Point ‍‍‍	4	–	4	–	1	.500	5	–	10	–	3	.361
Charleston Southern ‍‍‍	3	–	3	–	3	.500	5	–	8	–	4	.412
Longwood ‍‍‍	2	–	5	–	2	.333	5	–	9	–	4	.389
UNC Asheville ‍‍‍	2	–	6	–	1	.278	4	–	10	–	3	.324
Presbyterian ‍‍‍	2	–	6	–	1	.278	2	–	12	–	3	.206
Winthrop ‍‍‍	1	–	6	–	2	.222	4	–	8	–	3	.367
† – Conference champion ‡ – 2022 Big South Tournament champion y – Invited to the NCAA Tournament; As of December 6, 2022; Rankings from United Soccer Coaches Poll; Source:Big South Conference

2022 Big Ten Conference women's soccer standings
	Conf.						Overall
Team	W		L		T	PCT	W		L		T	PCT
No. 15 Michigan State ‍†‍‍^{y}	9	–	0	–	1	.950	17	–	3	–	3	.804
No. 11 Northwestern ‍‍‍^{y}	7	–	2	–	1	.750	16	–	5	–	2	.739
Wisconsin ‍‍‍	6	–	3	–	1	.650	11	–	5	–	3	.658
Nebraska ‍‍‍	5	–	3	–	2	.600	8	–	7	–	5	.525
Ohio State ‍‍‍^{y}	5	–	3	–	2	.600	11	–	6	–	3	.625
No. 13 Penn St ‍‍‡‍^{y}	5	–	3	–	2	.600	15	–	5	–	3	.717
Rutgers ‍‍‍^{y}	5	–	3	–	2	.600	13	–	5	–	2	.700
Minnesota ‍‍‍	4	–	4	–	2	.500	8	–	8	–	3	.500
Iowa ‍‍‍	2	–	3	–	5	.450	5	–	6	–	7	.472
Illinois ‍‍‍	2	–	5	–	3	.350	7	–	7	–	4	.500
Maryland ‍‍‍	3	–	7	–	0	.300	4	–	8	–	5	.382
Michigan ‍‍‍	2	–	6	–	2	.300	7	–	8	–	3	.472
Indiana ‍‍‍	1	–	7	–	2	.200	3	–	7	–	7	.382
Purdue ‍‍‍	0	–	7	–	3	.150	3	–	11	–	3	.265
† – Conference champion ‡ – 2022 Big Ten Tournament champion y – Invited to the NCAA tournament As of December 6, 2022; Rankings from United Soccer Coaches Poll; Source:Big Ten

2022 Big West Conference women's soccer standings
	Conf.						Overall
Team	W		L		T	PCT	W		L		T	PCT
Cal Poly ‍†‍‍	6	–	1	–	3	.750	9	–	7	–	3	.553
UC Davis ‍‍‍	6	–	2	–	2	.700	9	–	6	–	4	.579
Cal State Fullerton ‍‍‍	6	–	2	–	2	.700	9	–	6	–	5	.575
Long Beach St ‍‍‍	5	–	2	–	3	.650	8	–	7	–	6	.524
UC Santa Barbara ‍‍‍	4	–	3	–	3	.550	5	–	9	–	6	.400
No. 18 UC Irvine ‍‍‡‍^{y}	3	–	2	–	5	.550	11	–	6	–	7	.604
Hawaii ‍‍‍	3	–	4	–	3	.450	6	–	6	–	3	.500
Cal State Bakersfield ‍‍‍	2	–	3	–	5	.450	4	–	8	–	6	.389
UC San Diego ‍‍‍	2	–	4	–	4	.400	3	–	10	–	6	.316
Cal State Northridge ‍‍‍	1	–	8	–	1	.150	3	–	15	–	1	.184
UC Riverside ‍‍‍	0	–	7	–	3	.150	2	–	9	–	7	.306
† – Conference champion ‡ – 2022 Big West Tournament champion y – Invited to the NCAA Tournament; As of December 6, 2022; Rankings from United Soccer Coaches Poll; Source:The Big West Conference

2022 Big 12 Conference women's soccer standings
	Conf.						Overall
Team	W		L		T	PCT	W		L		T	PCT
No. 17 Texas ‍†‍‍^{y}	7	–	0	–	2	.889	15	–	3	–	4	.773
No. 10 TCU ‍‍‍^{y}	5	–	1	–	3	.722	14	–	5	–	5	.688
Texas Tech ‍‍‍	5	–	1	–	3	.722	9	–	4	–	6	.632
West Virginia ‍‍‡‍^{y}	4	–	1	–	4	.667	11	–	5	–	7	.630
Oklahoma St. ‍‍‍	4	–	2	–	3	.611	11	–	4	–	4	.684
Oklahoma ‍‍‍	3	–	5	–	1	.389	9	–	8	–	3	.525
Kansas ‍‍‍	2	–	5	–	2	.333	9	–	9	–	2	.500
Kansas State ‍‍‍	2	–	5	–	2	.333	6	–	10	–	3	.395
Baylor ‍‍‍	2	–	7	–	0	.222	4	–	11	–	2	.294
Iowa St. ‍‍‍	0	–	7	–	2	.111	3	–	10	–	4	.294
† – Conference champion ‡ – 2022 Big 12 Tournament champion y – Invited to the NCAA Tournament; As of December 6, 2022; Rankings from United Soccer Coaches Poll; Source: The Big 12 Conference

2022 Colonial Athletic Association women's soccer standings
	Conf.						Overall
Team	W		L		T	PCT	W		L		T	PCT
Monmouth ‍†‍‍	6	–	1	–	2	.778	13	–	2	–	3	.806
Drexel ‍‍‍	5	–	2	–	2	.667	11	–	3	–	5	.711
Northeastern ‍‍‍	5	–	2	–	2	.667	10	–	6	–	4	.600
Elon ‍‍‍	5	–	3	–	1	.611	9	–	6	–	3	.583
Towson ‍‍‍	4	–	1	–	4	.667	12	–	3	–	5	.725
Stony Brook ‍‍‍	4	–	2	–	3	.611	7	–	8	–	4	.474
William & Mary ‍‍‍	3	–	3	–	3	.500	7	–	8	–	4	.474
Hofstra ‍‍‡‍^{y}	3	–	4	–	2	.444	10	–	8	–	4	.545
UNC Wilmington ‍‍‍	3	–	4	–	2	.444	7	–	7	–	3	.500
Charleston ‍‍‍	2	–	4	–	3	.389	8	–	7	–	3	.528
Delaware ‍‍‍	1	–	6	–	2	.222	2	–	11	–	5	.250
Hampton ‍‍‍	0	–	9	–	0	.000	2	–	14	–	1	.147
† – Conference champion ‡ – 2022 CAA Tournament champion y – Invited to the NCAA Tournament; As of December 6, 2022; Rankings from United Soccer Coaches Poll; Source:Colonial Athletic Association

2022 Conference USA women's soccer standings
	Conf.						Overall
Team	W		L		T	PCT	W		L		T	PCT
Rice ‍†‍‍	9	–	0	–	1	.950	11	–	8	–	1	.575
North Texas ‍‍‍	7	–	2	–	1	.750	12	–	6	–	2	.650
UAB ‍‍‍	6	–	1	–	3	.750	9	–	4	–	5	.639
Louisiana Tech ‍‍‍	5	–	3	–	2	.600	7	–	9	–	3	.447
Florida Atlantic ‍‍‍	5	–	4	–	1	.550	11	–	8	–	3	.568
UTSA ‍‍‡‍^{y}	4	–	3	–	3	.550	12	–	6	–	4	.636
Western Kentucky ‍‍‍	4	–	5	–	1	.450	7	–	9	–	3	.447
Charlotte ‍‍‍	2	–	6	–	2	.300	4	–	11	–	4	.316
Florida International ‍‍‍	1	–	5	–	4	.300	3	–	8	–	4	.333
UTEP ‍‍‍	1	–	7	–	2	.200	4	–	11	–	3	.306
Middle Tennessee ‍‍‍	0	–	8	–	2	.100	2	–	12	–	3	.206
† – Conference champion ‡ – 2022 C-USA Tournament champion y – Invited to the NCAA Tournament; As of December 6, 2022; Rankings from United Soccer Coaches Poll; Source:Conference USA

2022 Horizon League women's soccer standings
	Conf.						Overall
Team	W		L		T	PCT	W		L		T	PCT
Milwaukee ‍†‍‡‍^{y}	7	–	1	–	2	.800	12	–	4	–	3	.711
Purdue Fort Wayne ‍‍‍	5	–	1	–	4	.700	9	–	4	–	6	.632
Oakland ‍‍‍	5	–	2	–	3	.650	8	–	4	–	7	.605
Wright State ‍‍‍	5	–	2	–	3	.650	8	–	7	–	3	.528
Youngstown State ‍‍‍	5	–	3	–	2	.600	8	–	8	–	3	.500
IUPUI ‍‍‍	4	–	3	–	3	.550	9	–	4	–	6	.632
Cleveland State ‍‍‍	4	–	4	–	2	.500	7	–	6	–	4	.529
Detroit Mercy ‍‍‍	4	–	6	–	0	.400	6	–	10	–	1	.382
Northern Kentucky ‍‍‍	2	–	7	–	1	.250	2	–	11	–	2	.200
Robert Morris ‍‍‍	1	–	7	–	2	.200	7	–	7	–	4	.500
Green Bay ‍‍‍	1	–	7	–	2	.200	3	–	11	–	2	.250
† – Conference champion ‡ – 2022 Horizon League Tournament champion y – Invited to the NCAA Tournament; As of December 6, 2022; Rankings from United Soccer Coaches Poll; Source:Horizon League

2022 Ivy League women's soccer standings
	Conf.						Overall
Team	W		L		T	PCT	W		L		T	PCT
Brown ‍†‍‍^{y}	5	–	0	–	1	.917	13	–	2	–	3	.806
No. 25 Harvard ‍‍‍^{y}	5	–	0	–	2	.857	12	–	2	–	3	.794
Yale ‍‍‍	3	–	1	–	2	.667	7	–	5	–	3	.567
Columbia ‍‍‍	3	–	3	–	1	.500	7	–	5	–	3	.567
Cornell ‍‍‍	2	–	3	–	2	.429	4	–	7	–	5	.406
Princeton ‍‍‍	2	–	4	–	1	.357	9	–	7	–	1	.559
Dartmouth ‍‍‍	1	–	5	–	1	.214	8	–	7	–	2	.529
Penn ‍‍‍	0	–	5	–	2	.143	3	–	6	–	7	.406
† – Conference champion y – Invited to the NCAA Tournament; As of December 6, 2022; Rankings from United Soccer Coaches Poll; Source:Ivy League

2022 Mid-American Conference women's soccer standings
	Conf.						Overall
Team	W		L		T	PCT	W		L		T	PCT
Buffalo ‍†‍‡‍^{y}	7	–	0	–	4	.818	15	–	2	–	4	.810
Ball State ‍‍‍	6	–	1	–	4	.727	7	–	5	–	8	.550
Bowling Green ‍‍‍	6	–	2	–	3	.682	9	–	5	–	5	.605
Ohio ‍‍‍	6	–	4	–	1	.591	10	–	7	–	2	.579
Miami (OH) ‍‍‍	4	–	2	–	5	.591	9	–	5	–	6	.600
Kent State ‍‍‍	4	–	2	–	5	.591	4	–	7	–	7	.417
Western Michigan ‍‍‍	5	–	4	–	2	.545	5	–	9	–	5	.395
Northern Illinois ‍‍‍	3	–	6	–	2	.364	6	–	7	–	4	.471
Akron ‍‍‍	2	–	7	–	2	.273	3	–	9	–	4	.313
Eastern Michigan ‍‍‍	2	–	7	–	2	.273	3	–	11	–	4	.278
Toledo ‍‍‍	1	–	6	–	4	.273	2	–	10	–	6	.278
Central Michigan ‍‍‍	1	–	6	–	4	.273	2	–	11	–	5	.250
† – Conference champion ‡ – 2022 MAC Tournament champion y – Invited to the NCAA Tournament; As of December 6, 2022; Rankings from United Soccer Coaches Poll; Source:Mid-American Conference

2022 MAAC women's soccer standings
	Conf.						Overall
Team	W		L		T	PCT	W		L		T	PCT
Quinnipiac ‍†‍‡‍^{y}	9	–	1	–	0	.900	16	–	3	–	1	.825
Fairfield ‍†‍‍	9	–	1	–	0	.900	14	–	4	–	0	.778
Niagara ‍‍‍	6	–	3	–	1	.650	11	–	8	–	1	.575
Rider ‍‍‍	5	–	5	–	0	.500	8	–	7	–	3	.528
Canisius ‍‍‍	3	–	2	–	5	.550	5	–	5	–	10	.500
Marist ‍‍‍	3	–	5	–	2	.400	5	–	7	–	5	.441
St. Peter's ‍‍‍	3	–	6	–	1	.350	4	–	13	–	1	.250
Iona ‍‍‍	3	–	6	–	1	.350	8	–	7	–	4	.526
Mount St. Mary's ‍‍‍	2	–	5	–	3	.350	3	–	6	–	7	.406
Manhattan ‍‍‍	1	–	5	–	4	.300	3	–	7	–	5	.367
Siena ‍‍‍	1	–	6	–	3	.250	2	–	11	–	5	.250
† – Conference champion ‡ – 2022 MAAC Tournament champion y – Invited to the NCAA Tournament; As of December 6, 2022; Rankings from United Soccer Coaches Poll; Source:MAAC

2022 Missouri Valley Conference women's soccer standings
	Conf.						Overall
Team	W		L		T	PCT	W		L		T	PCT
Valparaiso ‍†‍‍	7	–	1	–	2	.800	8	–	7	–	4	.526
Missouri State ‍‍‡‍^{y}	7	–	2	–	1	.750	12	–	7	–	2	.619
Southern Illinois ‍‍‍	5	–	2	–	3	.650	8	–	5	–	4	.588
UIC ‍‍‍	5	–	2	–	3	.650	5	–	6	–	6	.471
Drake ‍‍‍	4	–	2	–	4	.600	5	–	8	–	6	.421
UNI ‍‍‍	2	–	2	–	6	.500	6	–	6	–	8	.500
Belmont ‍‍‍	3	–	4	–	3	.450	5	–	6	–	6	.471
Murray State ‍‍‍	3	–	5	–	2	.400	7	–	12	–	3	.386
Indiana State ‍‍‍	2	–	6	–	2	.300	2	–	11	–	3	.219
Evansville ‍‍‍	1	–	6	–	3	.250	2	–	9	–	5	.281
Illinois State ‍‍‍	1	–	8	–	1	.150	3	–	14	–	1	.194
† – Conference champion ‡ – 2022 Missouri Valley Tournament champion y – Invited to the NCAA Tournament; As of December 6, 2022; Rankings from United Soccer Coaches Poll; Source:Missouri Valley Conference

2022 Mountain West Conference women's soccer standings
	Conf.						Overall
Team	W		L		T	PCT	W		L		T	PCT
Wyoming ‍†‍‍	6	–	3	–	2	.636	8	–	6	–	6	.550
New Mexico ‍‍‍	5	–	1	–	5	.682	7	–	3	–	9	.605
San Jose St ‍‍‡‍^{y}	6	–	3	–	2	.636	8	–	7	–	7	.523
Utah State ‍‍‍	5	–	3	–	3	.591	8	–	5	–	8	.571
San Diego St ‍‍‍	5	–	3	–	3	.591	7	–	6	–	8	.524
Colorado College ‍‍‍	4	–	3	–	4	.545	7	–	7	–	5	.500
Boise St ‍‍‍	4	–	3	–	4	.545	8	–	5	–	7	.575
Air Force ‍‍‍	4	–	4	–	3	.500	7	–	7	–	4	.500
UNLV ‍‍‍	3	–	3	–	5	.500	5	–	9	–	5	.395
Colorado St ‍‍‍	1	–	4	–	6	.364	4	–	7	–	8	.421
Nevada ‍‍‍	2	–	8	–	1	.227	3	–	12	–	3	.250
Fresno St ‍‍‍	1	–	8	–	2	.182	1	–	14	–	4	.158
† – Conference champion ‡ – 2022 MW Tournament champion y – Invited to the NCAA Tournament; As of December 6, 2022; Rankings from United Soccer Coaches Poll; Source:Mountain West Conference

2022 Northeast Conference women's soccer standings
	Conf.						Overall
Team	W		L		T	PCT	W		L		T	PCT
CCSU ‍†‍‍	7	–	0	–	2	.889	9	–	6	–	2	.588
Merrimack ‍‍‍	6	–	2	–	1	.722	8	–	8	–	3	.500
Sacred Heart ‍‍‍	5	–	1	–	3	.722	11	–	5	–	5	.643
FDU ‍‍‡‍^{y}	5	–	2	–	2	.667	8	–	11	–	3	.432
Saint Francis (PA) ‍‍‍	5	–	3	–	1	.611	7	–	10	–	1	.417
Stonehill ‍‍‍	3	–	5	–	1	.389	4	–	13	–	1	.250
LIU ‍‍‍	2	–	5	–	2	.333	4	–	12	–	3	.289
Wagner ‍‍‍	2	–	6	–	1	.278	4	–	12	–	1	.265
Howard ‍‍‍	2	–	6	–	1	.278	3	–	11	–	2	.250
St. Francis Brooklyn ‍‍‍	1	–	8	–	0	.111	2	–	11	–	3	.219
† – Conference champion ‡ – 2022 NEC Tournament champion y – Invited to the NCAA Tournament; As of December 6, 2022; Rankings from United Soccer Coaches Poll; Source:Northeast Conference

2022 Ohio Valley Conference women's soccer standings
	Conf.						Overall
Team	W		L		T	PCT	W		L		T	PCT
Tennessee Tech ‍†‍‍	5	–	0	–	3	.813	8	–	5	–	5	.583
SIUE ‍‍‡‍^{y}	5	–	1	–	2	.750	8	–	6	–	4	.556
SEMO ‍‍‍	4	–	2	–	2	.625	8	–	6	–	3	.559
Morehead St. ‍‍‍	4	–	2	–	2	.625	7	–	7	–	4	.500
Lindenwood ‍‍‍	2	–	2	–	4	.500	6	–	8	–	6	.450
Little Rock ‍‍‍	2	–	3	–	3	.438	5	–	7	–	5	.441
Southern Indiana ‍‍‍	1	–	5	–	2	.250	5	–	8	–	4	.412
UT Martin ‍‍‍	1	–	5	–	2	.250	4	–	9	–	5	.361
Eastern Illinois ‍‍‍	0	–	4	–	4	.250	2	–	6	–	8	.375
† – Conference champion ‡ – 2022 OVC Tournament champion y – Invited to the NCAA Tournament; As of December 6, 2022; Rankings from United Soccer Coaches Poll; Source:Ohio Valley Conference

2022 Pac-12 Conference women's soccer standings
	Conf.						Overall
Team	W		L		T	PCT	W		L		T	PCT
No. 16 Stanford ‍†‍‍^{y}	9	–	1	–	1	.864	17	–	2	–	3	.841
No. 1 UCLA ‍‍‍^{y}	9	–	2	–	0	.818	22	–	2	–	1	.900
No. 23т USC ‍‍‍^{y}	8	–	1	–	2	.818	12	–	3	–	3	.750
California ‍‍‍^{y}	5	–	3	–	3	.591	10	–	5	–	6	.619
Arizona St ‍‍‍^{y}	5	–	5	–	1	.500	9	–	6	–	3	.583
Arizona ‍‍‍	5	–	5	–	1	.500	8	–	7	–	3	.528
Washington ‍‍‍	4	–	6	–	1	.409	10	–	6	–	3	.605
Utah ‍‍‍	2	–	5	–	4	.364	6	–	7	–	6	.474
Washington St ‍‍‍	2	–	6	–	3	.318	8	–	7	–	4	.526
Colorado ‍‍‍	2	–	6	–	3	.318	8	–	7	–	5	.525
Oregon ‍‍‍	2	–	6	–	3	.318	4	–	8	–	7	.395
Oregon St ‍‍‍	1	–	8	–	2	.182	5	–	10	–	4	.368
† – Conference champion y – Invited to the NCAA Tournament; As of December 6, 2022; Rankings from United Soccer Coaches Poll; Source:Pac 12

2022 Patriot League women's soccer standings
	Conf.						Overall
Team	W		L		T	PCT	W		L		T	PCT
Army ‍†‍‍	6	–	1	–	2	.778	9	–	4	–	7	.625
Bucknell ‍‍‡‍^{y}	5	–	1	–	3	.722	8	–	6	–	6	.550
Boston U ‍‍‍	6	–	3	–	0	.667	11	–	8	–	1	.575
Lehigh ‍‍‍	5	–	2	–	2	.667	8	–	7	–	3	.528
Navy ‍‍‍	4	–	5	–	0	.444	8	–	8	–	3	.500
Loyola (MD) ‍‍‍	3	–	4	–	2	.444	6	–	8	–	4	.444
Colgate ‍‍‍	3	–	4	–	2	.444	3	–	10	–	4	.294
American ‍‍‍	2	–	5	–	2	.333	3	–	6	–	6	.400
Holy Cross ‍‍‍	2	–	6	–	1	.278	2	–	11	–	4	.235
Lafayette ‍‍‍	1	–	6	–	2	.222	3	–	11	–	3	.265
† – Conference champion ‡ – 2022 Patriot League tournament champion y – Invited to the NCAA Tournament; As of December 6, 2022; Rankings from United Soccer Coaches Poll; Source:Patriot League

2022 SEC women's soccer standings
	Conf.						Overall
Team	W		L		T	PCT	W		L		T	PCT
East
Tennessee ‍‍‍^{y}	7	–	2	–	1	.750	11	–	6	–	2	.632
No. 9 South Carolina ‍‍‡‍^{y}	6	–	3	–	1	.650	15	–	4	–	5	.729
Vanderbilt ‍‍‍^{y}	5	–	3	–	2	.600	12	–	5	–	4	.667
Georgia ‍‍‍^{y}	5	–	3	–	2	.600	13	–	6	–	3	.659
Missouri ‍‍‍	2	–	5	–	3	.350	5	–	8	–	4	.412
Kentucky ‍‍‍	0	–	8	–	2	.100	7	–	9	–	2	.444
Florida ‍‍‍	0	–	9	–	1	.050	2	–	14	–	1	.147
West
No. 4 Alabama ‍‍‍^{y}	10	–	0	–	0	1.000	23	–	3	–	1	.870
No. 8 Arkansas ‍‍‍^{y}	6	–	2	–	2	.700	13	–	4	–	5	.705
LSU ‍‍‍^{y}	4	–	2	–	4	.600	10	–	4	–	7	.643
Mississippi St. ‍‍‍^{y}	4	–	4	–	2	.500	12	–	6	–	4	.636
Texas A&M ‍‍‍^{y}	3	–	4	–	3	.450	9	–	7	–	5	.548
Ole Miss ‍‍‍	3	–	6	–	1	.350	9	–	7	–	4	.550
Auburn ‍‍‍	2	–	6	–	2	.300	6	–	6	–	6	.500
† – Conference champion ‡ – 2022 SEC Tournament champion y – Invited to the NCAA Tournament; As of December 6, 2022; Rankings from United Soccer Coaches Poll; Source:SEC

2022 Southern Conference women's soccer standings
	Conf.						Overall
Team	W		L		T	PCT	W		L		T	PCT
Samford ‍†‍‡‍^{y}	5	–	1	–	3	.722	11	–	4	–	7	.659
Chattanooga ‍†‍‍	5	–	1	–	3	.722	8	–	5	–	5	.583
Mercer ‍‍‍	4	–	1	–	4	.667	9	–	4	–	7	.625
UNC Greensboro ‍‍‍	4	–	3	–	2	.556	10	–	7	–	4	.571
Western Carolina ‍‍‍	4	–	4	–	1	.500	5	–	8	–	5	.417
ETSU ‍‍‍	3	–	3	–	3	.500	5	–	6	–	6	.471
The Citadel ‍‍‍	4	–	5	–	0	.444	10	–	9	–	0	.526
Wofford ‍‍‍	3	–	4	–	2	.444	9	–	8	–	3	.525
Furman ‍‍‍	3	–	4	–	2	.444	8	–	9	–	2	.474
VMI ‍‍‍	0	–	9	–	0	.000	1	–	17	–	2	.100
† – Conference champion ‡ – 2022 Southern Tournament champion y – Invited to the NCAA Tournament; As of December 6, 2022; Rankings from United Soccer Coaches Poll; Source:SoCon

2022 Southland Conference women's soccer standings
	Conf.						Overall
Team	W		L		T	PCT	W		L		T	PCT
Lamar ‍†‍‡‍^{y}	10	–	1	–	1	.875	15	–	2	–	2	.842
Northwestern St ‍‍‍	8	–	2	–	2	.750	12	–	4	–	3	.711
Texas A&M-Commerce* ‍‍‍	7	–	4	–	1	.625	9	–	9	–	2	.500
Houston Christian ‍‍‍	6	–	5	–	1	.542	7	–	10	–	3	.425
SE Louisiana ‍‍‍	5	–	4	–	3	.542	7	–	7	–	3	.500
Texas A&M-CC ‍‍‍	5	–	6	–	1	.458	8	–	9	–	1	.472
McNeese ‍‍‍	3	–	5	–	4	.417	5	–	9	–	4	.389
Incarnate Word ‍‍‍	2	–	7	–	3	.292	3	–	10	–	3	.281
Nicholls ‍‍‍	0	–	11	–	0	.000	2	–	15	–	1	.139
† – Conference champion ‡ – 2022 Southland Tournament champion y – Invited to the NCAA Tournament; Texas A&M–Commerce ineligible for postseason NCAA Championship play due to transition from NCAA Division II; As of December 6, 2022; Rankings from United Soccer Coaches Poll; Source:Southland Conference

2022 SWAC women's soccer standings
	Conf.						Overall
Team	W		L		T	PCT	W		L		T	PCT
Jackson State ‍†‍‡‍^{y}	7	–	1	–	1	.833	11	–	8	–	1	.575
Grambling State ‍‍‍	5	–	1	–	3	.722	12	–	8	–	3	.587
Southern ‍‍‍	5	–	3	–	1	.611	8	–	9	–	2	.474
Alabama State ‍‍‍	4	–	2	–	3	.611	6	–	8	–	4	.444
Texas Southern ‍‍‍	4	–	3	–	2	.556	5	–	10	–	3	.361
UAPB ‍‍‍	4	–	4	–	1	.500	9	–	10	–	1	.475
Alcorn State ‍‍‍	3	–	3	–	3	.500	5	–	9	–	4	.389
Alabama A&M ‍‍‍	2	–	5	–	2	.333	4	–	12	–	2	.278
Prairie View A&M ‍‍‍	2	–	7	–	0	.222	2	–	11	–	0	.154
Mississippi Valley State ‍‍‍	0	–	7	–	2	.111	0	–	12	–	2	.071
† – Conference champion ‡ – 2022 SWAC Tournament champion y – Invited to the NCAA Tournament; As of December 6, 2022; Rankings from United Soccer Coaches Poll; Source: SWAC

2022 Summit League women's soccer standings
	Conf.						Overall
Team	W		L		T	PCT	W		L		T	PCT
Denver ‍†‍‍	8	–	0	–	1	.944	11	–	4	–	4	.684
South Dakota St ‍‍‍	7	–	0	–	2	.889	13	–	1	–	5	.816
Omaha ‍‍‡‍^{y}	4	–	2	–	3	.611	7	–	9	–	6	.455
Oral Roberts ‍‍‍	4	–	5	–	0	.444	10	–	9	–	3	.523
North Dakota St ‍‍‍	4	–	5	–	0	.444	8	–	9	–	3	.475
South Dakota ‍‍‍	3	–	4	–	2	.444	4	–	9	–	5	.361
North Dakota ‍‍‍	3	–	4	–	2	.444	7	–	9	–	4	.450
St. Thomas* ‍‍‍	2	–	6	–	1	.278	6	–	8	–	3	.441
Kansas City ‍‍‍	1	–	5	–	3	.278	2	–	11	–	5	.250
Western Illinois ‍‍‍	2	–	7	–	0	.222	4	–	10	–	3	.324
† – Conference champion ‡ – 2022 Summit League Tournament champion y – Invited to the NCAA Tournament * Ineligible for the 2022 NCAA tournament due to transition from Division III; As of December 6, 2022; Rankings from United Soccer Coaches Poll; Source:Summit League

2022 Sun Belt Conference women's soccer standings
	Conf.						Overall
Team	W		L		T	PCT	W		L		T	PCT
East
Georgia Southern ‍†‍‍	7	–	1	–	2	.800	8	–	4	–	5	.618
James Madison ‍‍‍	6	–	1	–	3	.750	12	–	4	–	5	.690
Old Dominion ‍‍‡‍^{y}	5	–	4	–	1	.550	9	–	9	–	3	.500
Appalachian State ‍‍‍	5	–	5	–	0	.500	6	–	9	–	4	.421
Georgia State ‍‍‍	3	–	5	–	2	.400	9	–	7	–	5	.548
Marshall ‍‍‍	2	–	5	–	3	.350	4	–	10	–	5	.342
Coastal Carolina ‍‍‍	2	–	6	–	2	.300	3	–	10	–	4	.294
West
Arkansas State ‍‍‍	7	–	2	–	1	.750	9	–	6	–	3	.583
South Alabama ‍‍‍	6	–	1	–	3	.750	11	–	2	–	7	.725
Texas State ‍‍‍	6	–	3	–	1	.650	12	–	5	–	2	.684
Southern Miss ‍‍‍	2	–	5	–	3	.350	2	–	10	–	4	.250
Louisiana ‍‍‍	2	–	6	–	2	.300	3	–	9	–	5	.324
UL Monroe ‍‍‍	2	–	6	–	2	.300	10	–	6	–	3	.605
Troy ‍‍‍	1	–	6	–	3	.250	3	–	9	–	4	.313
† – Conference champion ‡ – 2022 Sun Belt Tournament champion y – Invited to the NCAA Tournament; As of December 6, 2022; Rankings from United Soccer Coaches Poll; Source:Sun Belt

2022 West Coast Conference women's soccer standings
	Conf.						Overall
Team	W		L		T	PCT	W		L		T	PCT
No. 22 Santa Clara ‍†‍‍^{y}	7	–	0	–	2	.889	12	–	7	–	3	.614
No. 14 BYU ‍‍‍^{y}	6	–	0	–	3	.833	11	–	3	–	7	.690
Gonzaga ‍‍‍	5	–	1	–	3	.722	10	–	3	–	5	.694
Portland ‍‍‍^{y}	5	–	4	–	0	.556	12	–	5	–	4	.667
Pepperdine ‍‍‍	3	–	3	–	3	.500	9	–	4	–	5	.639
San Francisco ‍‍‍	3	–	3	–	3	.500	8	–	5	–	6	.579
Pacific ‍‍‍	2	–	3	–	4	.444	7	–	3	–	10	.600
Saint Mary's ‍‍‍	1	–	4	–	4	.333	5	–	6	–	7	.472
Loyola Marymount ‍‍‍	1	–	8	–	0	.111	3	–	8	–	6	.353
San Diego ‍‍‍	0	–	7	–	2	.111	2	–	12	–	5	.237
† – Conference champion y – Invited to the NCAA tournament As of December 6, 2022; Rankings from United Soccer Coaches Poll; Source:West Coast Conference

2022 WAC women's soccer standings
	Conf.						Overall
Team	W		L		T	PCT	W		L		T	PCT
Utah Valley ‍†‍‍^{y}	9	–	1	–	1	.864	14	–	5	–	3	.705
Seattle ‍‍‍	8	–	1	–	2	.818	11	–	6	–	3	.625
New Mexico St ‍‍‡‍^{y}	7	–	2	–	2	.727	13	–	5	–	3	.690
Utah Tech ‍‍‍	6	–	3	–	2	.636	10	–	6	–	2	.611
Grand Canyon ‍‍‍	6	–	4	–	1	.591	11	–	7	–	2	.600
California Baptist ‍‍‍	5	–	3	–	3	.591	8	–	5	–	5	.583
Stephen F. Austin ‍‍‍	5	–	6	–	0	.455	6	–	11	–	1	.361
Southern Utah ‍‍‍	4	–	5	–	2	.455	9	–	6	–	2	.588
Tarleton ‍‍‍	2	–	7	–	2	.273	6	–	9	–	3	.417
Sam Houston ‍‍‍	2	–	8	–	1	.227	3	–	11	–	2	.250
UTRGV ‍‍‍	1	–	7	–	3	.227	3	–	12	–	3	.250
Abilene Christian ‍‍‍	0	–	8	–	3	.136	4	–	10	–	4	.333
† – Conference champion ‡ – 2022 WAC Tournament champion y – Invited to the NCAA Tournament; As of December 6, 2022; Rankings from United Soccer Coaches Poll; Source:WAC

2022 NCAA Division I independents women's soccer records
	Conf.						Overall
Team	W		L		T	PCT	W		L		T	PCT
Hartford ‍‍‍	0	–	0	–	0	–	10	–	3	–	1	.750
Chicago State ‍‍‍	0	–	0	–	0	–	3	–	14	–	1	.194
Delaware State ‍‍‍	0	–	0	–	0	–	2	–	14	–	2	.167
South Carolina State ‍‍‍	0	–	0	–	0	–	2	–	18	–	0	.100
† – Conference champion y – Invited to the NCAA Tournament; As of December 6, 2022; Rankings from United Soccer Coaches Poll; Source:

=== Conference winners and tournaments ===
Conference	Regular Season Champion(s)	Tournament Winner	Conference Tournament	Tournament Dates	Tournament Venue (City)
ACC	North Carolina (Note: Top seed in conference tournament.); Florida State	Florida State	2022 Tournament	October 30 - November 6	First Round: Campus sites, hosted by higher seed Semifinals and Final: WakeMed Soccer Park • Cary, North Carolina
America East	Binghamton	New Hampshire	2022 Tournament	October 30 - November 6	Campus sites, hosted by higher seed
American	UCF	Memphis	2022 Tournament	October 30 - November 6	Quarterfinals: Campus sites, hosted by higher seed Semifinals and final: Hosted by regular-season champion
ASUN	Liberty	Florida Gulf Coast	2022 Tournament	October 27 - November 4	Campus sites, hosted by higher seed
Atlantic 10	Saint Louis		2022 Tournament	October 28 - November 6	Campus sites, hosted by highest remaining seed
Big 12	Texas	West Virginia	2022 Tournament	October 30 - November 6	Round Rock Multipurpose Complex • Round Rock, Texas
Big East	Georgetown		2022 Tournament	October 30 - November 6	First Round: Campus sites, hosted by higher seed Semifinals and Final: Maryland SoccerPlex • Boyds, Maryland
Big Sky	Northern Arizona		2022 Tournament	November 2 - November 6	Jackson Stadium • Greeley, Colorado
Big South	Campbell	Radford	2022 Tournament	November 3 - November 6	Sportsplex at Matthews • Matthews, North Carolina
Big Ten	Michigan State	Penn State	2022 Tournament	October 30 - November 6	Quarterfinals: Campus sites, hosted by higher seed Semifinals and Final: Lower.com Field • Columbus, Ohio
Big West	Cal Poly	UC Irvine	2022 Tournament	October 30 - November 6	First Round: Campus sites, hosted by higher seed Semifinals and Final: Hosted by regular-season champion
CAA	Monmouth	Hofstra	2022 Tournament	October 27 - November 5	Quarterfinals and Semifinals: Hosted by top 2 seeds Final: Hosted by highest remaining seed
C-USA	Rice	UTSA	2022 Tournament	November 2 - November 6	Transamerica Field • Charlotte, North Carolina
Horizon	Milwaukee		2022 Tournament	October 30 - November 5	Quarterfinals: Campus sites, hosted by higher seed Semifinals and Final: Hosted by regular-season champion
Ivy	Brown	No Tournament			
MAAC	Quinnipiac; Fairfield	Quinnipiac	2022 Tournament	October 30 - November 6	Campus Sites, hosted by higher seed
MAC	Buffalo		2022 Tournament	October 30 - November 6	Quarterfinals: Campus sites, hosted by higher seed Semifinals and Final: Hosted by highest remaining seed
Missouri Valley	Valparaiso	Missouri State	2022 Tournament	October 27 - November 6	First Round and Quarterfinals: Campus sites, hosted by higher seed Semifinals and Final: Hosted by regular-season champion
Mountain West	Wyoming	San Jose State	2022 Tournament	October 27 - November 5	UNM Soccer Complex • Albuquerque, New Mexico
Northeast	Central Connecticut	Fairleigh Dickinson	2022 Tournament	October 30 - November 6	Campus Sites, hosted by higher seed
Ohio Valley	Tennessee Tech	SIU Edwardsville	2022 Tournament	October 28 - November 6	First Round and Quarterfinals: Campus sites, hosted by higher seed Semifinals and Final: Hosted by regular-season champion
Pac-12	Stanford	No Tournament			
Patriot	Army	Bucknell	2022 Tournament	October 30 - November 6	Campus Sites, hosted by higher seed
SEC	Tennessee (East)	South Carolina	2022 Tournament	October 30 - November 6	Ashton Brosnaham Soccer Complex • Pensacola, Florida
SEC	Alabama (West)	South Carolina	2022 Tournament	October 30 - November 6	Ashton Brosnaham Soccer Complex • Pensacola, Florida
SoCon	Chattanooga; Samford	Samford	2022 Tournament	October 25 - November 6	Campus Sites, hosted by higher seed
Southland	Lamar		2022 Tournament	November 2 - November 6	Lady Demon Soccer Complex • Natchitoches, Louisiana
The Summit	Denver	Omaha	2022 Tournament	October 28 - November 5	Campus Sites, hosted by higher seed
Sun Belt	Georgia Southern (East)	Old Dominion	2022 Tournament	October 31 - November 6	Foley Sports Tourism Complex • Foley, Alabama
Sun Belt	Arkansas State (West)	Old Dominion	2022 Tournament	October 31 - November 6	Foley Sports Tourism Complex • Foley, Alabama
SWAC	Jackson State		2022 Tournament	November 3 - November 6	PVAMU Soccer Complex • Prairie View, Texas
WCC	Santa Clara	No Tournament			
WAC	Utah Valley	New Mexico State	2022 Tournament	November 2 - November 6	Championship Field • Seattle, Washington

== Postseason ==
=== Final rankings ===
Rank	United Soccer Coaches	TopDrawerSoccer.com
1	UCLA	UCLA
2	North Carolina	North Carolina
3	Florida State	Alabama
4	Alabama	Florida State
5	Notre Dame	Notre Dame
6	Duke	Virginia
7	Virginia	Arkansas
8	Arkansas	Duke
9	South Carolina	Stanford
10	TCU	Penn State
11	Northwestern	Michigan State
12	Pittsburgh	BYU
13	Penn State	Georgetown
14	BYU	Northwestern
15	Michigan State	Texas
16	Stanford	TCU
17	Texas	South Carolina
18	UC Irvine	Xavier
19	Georgetown	Brown
20	Saint Louis	Pittsburgh
21	Memphis	Santa Clara
22	Santa Clara	UCF
23	USC (tie)	Vanderbilt
24	UCF (tie)	Saint Louis
25	Harvard	Rutgers

== Award winners ==
=== All-America teams ===
2022 United Soccer Coaches All-America Teams
First Team	Second Team	Third Team
Lauren Kozal, GK, Michigan State; Eva Gaetino, DF, Notre Dame; Lyndsey Heckel, DF, Saint Louis; Julia Leas, DF, Georgetown; Reyna Reyes, DF, Alabama; Korbin Albert, MF, Notre Dame; Hannah Bebar, MF, Harvard; Croix Bethune, MF, USC; Lia Godfrey, MF, Virginia; Jenna Nighswonger, MF, Florida State; Trinity Byars, FW, Texas; Michelle Cooper, FW, Duke; Riley Mattingly Parker, FW, Alabama; Brittany Raphino, FW, Brown; Ally Schlegel, FW, Penn State	Emily Kelly, GK, Buffalo; Tori Hansen, DF, North Carolina; Jyllissa Harris, DF, South Carolina; Lilly Reale, DF, UCLA; Jade Rose, DF, Harvard; Maya Doms, MF, Stanford; Emma Jaskaniec, MF, Wisconsin; Abbie Miller, MF, Saint Louis; Jamie Shepherd, MF, BYU; Grace Yochum, MF, Oklahoma State; Messiah Bright, FW, TCU; Izzy D'Aquila, FW, Santa Clara; Lauren DeBeau, FW, Michigan State; Nicole Douglas, FW, Arizona State; Brecken Mozingo, FW, BYU	Emily Puricelli, GK, Saint Louis; Cristina Roque, GK, Florida State; Jordan Brewster, DF, West Virginia; Hannah Callaghan, DF, Buffalo; Kayla Duran, DF, Brown; Emily Mason, DF, Rutgers; Gracie Brian, MF, TCU; Abby Boyan, MF, Georgia; Taylor Huff, MF, Tennessee; Felicia Knox, MF, Alabama; Molly McLaughlin, MF, Xavier; Sam Meza, MF, North Carolina; Jody Brown, FW, Florida State; Rebecca Cooke, FW, Quinnipiac; Anna Podojil, FW, Arkansas; Olivia Wingate, FW, Notre Dame

=== Major player of the year awards ===
- Hermann Trophy: Michelle Cooper, Duke
- TopDrawerSoccer.com National Player of the Year Award: Korbin Albert, Notre Dame

=== Other major awards ===
- United Soccer Coaches College Coach of the Year: Margueritte Aozasa, UCLA
- Bill Jeffrey Award:
- Jerry Yeagley Award: Kristin Acquavella
- Mike Berticelli Award: Felicity Day
- NCAA Tournament MVP: Offensive: Reilyn Turner Defensive: Lilly Reale

== See also ==
- College soccer
- List of NCAA Division I women's soccer programs
- 2022 in American soccer
- 2022 NCAA Division I Women's Soccer Tournament
- 2022 NCAA Division I men's soccer season
