= 2022 SWAC women's soccer tournament =

- Classification: Division I
- Teams: 8
- Matches: 7
- Attendance: 1,075
- Site: PVA&M Soccer Stadium; Prairie View, Texas
- Champions: Jackson State (3rd title)
- Winning coach: Ted Flogaites (1st title)
- MVP: Jordan Smith (Jackson State)
- Broadcast: SWAC Digital Network

2022 SWAC women's soccer standings
	Conf.						Overall
Team	W		L		T	PCT	W		L		T	PCT
Jackson State ‍†‍‡‍^{y}	7	–	1	–	1	.833	11	–	8	–	1	.575
Grambling State ‍‍‍	5	–	1	–	3	.722	12	–	8	–	3	.587
Southern ‍‍‍	5	–	3	–	1	.611	8	–	9	–	2	.474
Alabama State ‍‍‍	4	–	2	–	3	.611	6	–	8	–	4	.444
Texas Southern ‍‍‍	4	–	3	–	2	.556	5	–	10	–	3	.361
UAPB ‍‍‍	4	–	4	–	1	.500	9	–	10	–	1	.475
Alcorn State ‍‍‍	3	–	3	–	3	.500	5	–	9	–	4	.389
Alabama A&M ‍‍‍	2	–	5	–	2	.333	4	–	12	–	2	.278
Prairie View A&M ‍‍‍	2	–	7	–	0	.222	2	–	11	–	0	.154
Mississippi Valley State ‍‍‍	0	–	7	–	2	.111	0	–	12	–	2	.071
† – Conference champion ‡ – 2022 SWAC Tournament champion y – Invited to the NCAA Tournament; As of December 6, 2022; Rankings from United Soccer Coaches Poll; Source: SWAC

The 2022 SWAC women's soccer tournament was the postseason women's soccer tournament for the Southwestern Athletic Conference held November 3–6, 2022. The seven-match tournament took place at the Prairie View A&M Soccer Stadium in Prairie View, Texas. The eight-team single-elimination tournament consisted of three rounds based on seeding from regular season conference play. The defending champions were the Prairie View A&M Panthers, however they were unable to defend their title, not qualifying for the tournament as they finished in ninth place in regular season play. Top seed Jackson State won the tournament, defeating Grambling State in overtime in the Final. The conference tournament title was the third in the history of the Jackson State women's soccer program, and first for head coach Ted Flogaites. As tournament champions, Jackson State earned the SWAC's automatic berth into the 2022 NCAA Division I Women's Soccer Tournament.

== Seeding ==
Eight of the ten teams that compete in women's soccer qualified for the 2022 Tournament. Seeding was based on regular season conference play. No tiebreakers were required as all teams finished with unique regular season conference records.

Seed	School	Conference Record	Points
1	Jackson State	7–1–1	22
2	Grambling State	5–1–3	18
3	Southern	5–3–1	16
4	Alabama State	4–2–3	15
5	Texas Southern	4–3–2	14
6	Arkansas-Pine Bluff	4–4–1	13
7	Alcorn State	3–3–3	12
8	Alabama A&M	2–5–2	8

== Bracket ==
Quarterfinals; Thursday, Nov. 3
1	Jackson State	2
8	Alabama A&M	0
4	Alabama State	0
5	Texas Southern	2
3	Southern	3
6	UAPB	1
2	Grambling State (a.e.t.)	1
7	Alcorn State	0

Semifinals; Friday, Nov. 4
1	Jackson State	2
5	Texas Southern	0
3	Southern	1
2	Grambling State	3

Final; Sunday, Nov. 6
1	Jackson State (a.e.t.)	4
2	Grambling State	2

== Schedule ==
=== Quarterfinals ===
November 3	#1 Jackson State	2–0	#8 Alabama A&M	Prairie View, Texas
10:00 a.m. CST	Kendyl Terrell 27'; Sage Magruder (yellow card) 58'; Sydni Wilson 69'	Report	(red card) 56' Taylor Watson; (yellow card) 57' K'la Barnes-Blackwood	Stadium: PVA&M Soccer Stadium; Attendance: 62

November 3	#4 Alabama State	0–2	#5 Texas Southern	Prairie View, Texas
1:00 p.m. CST	Katelyn Walerczyk (yellow card) 28'	Report	(yellow card) 63', (goal) 88' Ayana Noel; 64' Sammie Garcia	Stadium: PVA&M Soccer Stadium; Attendance: 78; Referee: Wes Caouette; Assistant referees: Jalen Gray; Sean Caouette; Fourth official: Estefania Estrada

November 3	#2 Grambling State	1–0 (a.e.t.)	#7 Alcorn State	Prairie View, Texas
4:00 p.m. CST	Beatriz Kretteis 96', (yellow card) 107'	Report	(yellow card) 76' Emily Serrato	Stadium: PVA&M Soccer Stadium; Attendance: 78; Referee: Benjamin Meyer; Assistant referees: Holden Gregory; Jalen Gray; Fourth official: Sean Caouette

November 3	#3 Southern	3–1	#6 Arkansas-Pine Bluff	Prairie View, Texas
7:00 p.m. CST	Alyssa Terry 6', (yellow card) 76'; Alayla Jackson 55'; Giftee Tor 79'	Report	66' Madison Hernandez; (yellow card) 68' Brooke Gonzalez	Stadium: PVA&M Soccer Stadium; Attendance: 126; Referee: Frank Huber; Assistant referees: Alexandra Platt; Wes Caouette; Fourth official: Jordan Gray

=== Semifinals ===
November 3	#1 Jackson State	2–0	#5 Texas Southern	Prairie View, Texas
4:00 p.m. CST	Kiana Tulloch (yellow card) 31'; Alexes Sanchez 43'; Kalia Uehara (yellow card) 67', (goal) 67'; Brynn Walker (yellow card) 89'	Report	(yellow card) 66' Victoria Pucci	Stadium: PVA&M Soccer Stadium; Attendance: 312

November 3	#2 Grambling State	3–1	#3 Southern	Prairie View, Texas
7:00 p.m. CST	Mackenzie Rastatter 14'; Beatriz Kretteis 18'; Nia Harley 27'	Report	(yellow card) 70' Ashante Gatlin; 74' Khari Price	Stadium: PVA&M Soccer Stadium; Attendance: 212; Referee: Sean Caouette; Assistant referees: Jordan Gray; Wes Caouette; Fourth official: Holden Gregory

=== Final ===
November 6	#1 Jackson State	4–2 (a.e.t.)	#2 Grambling State	Prairie View, Texas
1:00 p.m. CST	Kendyl Terrell 26', 100'; Karime Antonio Lopez (yellow card) 39'; Alexes Sanchez 47'; Maya-Joy Thompson 110'	Report	(yellow card) 56' Imogen Fowler; (yellow card) 81' Tanzanea Villacis; 86' Lizbeth Aguero; 90' Laila Loring	Stadium: PVA&M Soccer Stadium; Attendance: 207

== Statistics ==
=== Goalscorers ===
There were 21 goals scored in 7 matches, for an average of 3 goals per match (as of November 6, 2022).

3 goals

- Kendyl Terrell – Jackson State

2 goals

- Beatriz Kretteis – Grambling State
- Alexes Sanchez – Jackson State

1 goal

- Madison Hernandez – Arkansas-Pine Bluff
- Lizbeth Aguero – Grambling State
- Nia Harley – Grambling State
- Laila Loring – Grambling State
- Mackenzie Rastatter – Grambling State
- Maya-Joy Thompson – Jackson State
- Kalia Uehara – Jackson State
- Sydni Wilson – Jackson State
- Alayla Jackson – Southern
- Khari Price – Southern
- Alyssa Terry – Southern
- Giftee Tor – Southern
- Sammie Garcia – Texas Southern
- Ayana Noel– Texas Southern

== All-Tournament team ==
Player	Team
Aniya Clark	Southern
Lonnie Mulligan	Southern
Ayana Noel	Texas Southern
Mackenzie Rastatter	Grambling State
Beatriz Kretteis	Grambling State
Aryanna Buggs	Grambling State
Olivia Cobb	Jackson State
Kendyl Terrell	Jackson State
Tionna Taylor	Jackson State
Sydni Wilson	Jackson State
**Jordan Smith**	Jackson State

MVP in bold
