= 2022 Missouri Valley Conference women's soccer tournament =

- Classification: Division I
- Teams: 8
- Matches: 7
- Attendance: 1,973
- Site: Brown Field (Semifinals & Final); Valparaiso, Indiana
- Champions: Missouri State (3rd title)
- Winning coach: Kirk Nelson (1st title)
- MVP: Kaeli Benedict (Missouri State)
- Broadcast: ESPN+

2022 Missouri Valley Conference women's soccer standings
	Conf.						Overall
Team	W		L		T	PCT	W		L		T	PCT
Valparaiso ‍†‍‍	7	–	1	–	2	.800	8	–	7	–	4	.526
Missouri State ‍‍‡‍^{y}	7	–	2	–	1	.750	12	–	7	–	2	.619
Southern Illinois ‍‍‍	5	–	2	–	3	.650	8	–	5	–	4	.588
UIC ‍‍‍	5	–	2	–	3	.650	5	–	6	–	6	.471
Drake ‍‍‍	4	–	2	–	4	.600	5	–	8	–	6	.421
UNI ‍‍‍	2	–	2	–	6	.500	6	–	6	–	8	.500
Belmont ‍‍‍	3	–	4	–	3	.450	5	–	6	–	6	.471
Murray State ‍‍‍	3	–	5	–	2	.400	7	–	12	–	3	.386
Indiana State ‍‍‍	2	–	6	–	2	.300	2	–	11	–	3	.219
Evansville ‍‍‍	1	–	6	–	3	.250	2	–	9	–	5	.281
Illinois State ‍‍‍	1	–	8	–	1	.150	3	–	14	–	1	.194
† – Conference champion ‡ – 2022 Missouri Valley Tournament champion y – Invited to the NCAA Tournament; As of December 6, 2022; Rankings from United Soccer Coaches Poll; Source:Missouri Valley Conference

The 2022 Missouri Valley Conference women's soccer tournament was the postseason women's soccer tournament for the Missouri Valley Conference held from October 27 through November 6, 2022. The Opening round and Second round was held at campus sites. The semifinals and finals took place at Brown Field in Valparaiso, Indiana. The eight-team single-elimination tournament consisted of four rounds based on seeding from regular season conference play. The defending champions were the Loyola Ramblers, who did not defend their title as they moved to the A-10 Conference. The tournament champions were the Missouri State Bears who defeated Murray State 1–0 in the final. The conference tournament title was the third for the Missouri State women's soccer program, and first for head coach Kirk Nelson. The championship was the first since 2017 for Missouri State. As tournament champions, Missouri State earned the Missouri Valley's automatic berth into the 2022 NCAA Division I Women's Soccer Tournament.

== Seeding ==
Eight of the eleven Missouri Valley Conference women's soccer programs qualified for the 2022 Tournament. Teams were seeded based on their regular season records. A tiebreaker was required to determine the third and fourth seeds between Southern Illinois and UIC as both teams finished the regular season with 5–2–3 conference records. UIC claimed the third seed by virtue of a 1–0 win over Southern Illinois on the last day of the regular season. UNI and Belmont both finished the season tied with twelve points after regular season play, leaving a tiebreaker required for the sixth and seventh seeds. UNI was awarded the sixth seed based on cumulative record against teams above them in the standings because their regular season match ended in a 0–0 draw. UNI was 0–2–3 against teams above them, earning three points, while Belmont was 0–4–1 against teams above them, only earning one point.

Seed	School	Conference Record	Points
1	Valparaiso	7–1–2	23
2	Missouri State	7–2–1	22
3	UIC	5–2–3	18
4	Southern Illinois	5–2–3	18
5	Drake	4–2–4	16
6	UNI	2–2–6	12
7	Belmont	3–4–3	12
8	Murray State	3–5–2	11

== Bracket ==
Opening Round; Thursday, Oct. 27
5	Drake	0
8	Murray State	1
6	UNI (a.e.t.)	1
7	Belmont	0

Second Round; Sunday, Oct. 30
4	Southern Illinois	1
8	Murray State (a.e.t.)	2
3	UIC	1 (2)
6	UNI (pen.)	1 (4)

Semifinals; Friday, Nov. 3
1	Valparaiso	0
8	Murray State	1
2	Missouri State	2
6	UNI	1

Final; Sunday, Nov. 6
8	Murray State	0
2	Missouri State	1

== Schedule ==
=== Opening Round ===
October 27	#6 UNI	1–0 (a.e.t.)	#7 Belmont	Chicago, IL
2:00 p.m. CT	Sophia Meier (yellow card) 85'; Sophia Balistreri 98'	Report		Stadium: Flames Field; Attendance: 76; Referee: Christopher Koloffon; Assistant referees: Quinton McFarlen; Adam Herges; Fourth official: Besnik Rexhepi

October 27	#5 Drake	0–1	#8 Murray State	Carbondale, IL
6:00 p.m. CT	Maia Bentley (yellow card) 84'	Report	(yellow card) 49' Lauren Payne; 76' Morgan Bodker; (yellow card) 83' Mary Hardy; (yellow card) 90' Carly Embry	Stadium: Hartzog Track and Field Complex; Attendance: 400; Referee: Braeden Frey; Assistant referees: Kurt Wuebbels; Jose Renda; Fourth official: Johann Arnason

=== Second Round ===
October 30	#3 UIC	1–1 (a.e.t.) (2–4 p)	#6 UNI	Chicago, IL
12:00 p.m. CT	Frankie Frericks 84'; Megan Bowman (yellow card) 104'	Report	61' Allison Whitaker; (yellow card) 90' Team	Stadium: Flames Field; Attendance: 211; Referee: Heber Estrada; Assistant referees: Armand Bennage; Adam Herges; Fourth official: Sina Kashef
	Penalties
	Megan Bowman (penalty missed); Frankie Frericks (penalty scored); Hannah Gryzik (penalty scored); Yulexi Diaz (penalty missed)		(penalty scored) Lauren Heinsch; (penalty scored) Ashley Harrington; (penalty scored) Maddie Eastus; (penalty scored) Lizzie Mewes

October 30	#4 Southern Illinois	1–2 (a.e.t.)	#8 Murray State	Carbondale, IL
2:00 p.m. CT	Kaitlin DuCharme 32'; Ashlyn Henrie (yellow card) 108'	Report	(yellow card) 71' Lauren Payne; 80' Mary Hardy; 110' Saraya Young	Stadium: Hartzog Track and Field Complex; Attendance: 400; Referee: Tim Wagner; Assistant referees: Joshua Few; Tom Kuczwara; Fourth official: Jeff Pulley

=== Semifinals ===
November 3	#2 Missouri State	2–1	#6 UNI	Valparaiso, IN
3:00 p.m. CT	Hailey Chambliss 7'; Kaeli Benedict 36'	Report	62' Lizzie Mewes	Stadium: Brown Field; Attendance: 68; Referee: Calin Radosav; Assistant referees: Adrian Werbicki; Fernando Ibarra; Fourth official: Peter Charpentier

November 3	#1 Valparaiso	0–1	#8 Murray State	Valparaiso, IN
6:00 p.m. CT	Abby White (yellow card) 83'; Cassidy Eckstein (yellow card) 87'	Report	13' Mary Hardy; (yellow card) 90' Team	Stadium: Brown Field; Attendance: 693; Referee: Dimitrios Katsimingos; Assistant referees: Sean West; Joshua Overmyer; Fourth official: Fernando Pina

=== Final ===
November 6	#2 Missouri State	1–0	#8 Murray State	Valparaiso, IN
3:00 p.m. CT	Hailey Chambliss 56'	Report	(yellow card) 83' Team	Stadium: Brown Field; Attendance: 125; Referee: Art Arustamyan; Assistant referees: Erin Patterson; Kaitlyn Trowbridge; Fourth official: Nemanja Stefanovic

== Statistics ==
=== Goalscorers ===
There were 12 goals scored in 7 matches, for an average of 1.71 goals per match (as of November 6, 2022).

2 goals

- Hailey Chambliss – Missouri State
- Mary Hardy – Murray State

1 goal

- Kaeli Benedict – Missouri State
- Morgan Bodker – Murray State
- Saraya Young – Murray State
- Kaitlin DuCharme – Southern Illinois
- Frankie Frericks – UIC
- Sophia Ballistreri – UNI
- Lizzie Mewes – UNI
- Allison Whitaker – UNI

== All-Tournament team ==
Player	Team
**Kaeli Benedict**	Missouri State
Grace O'Keefe	Missouri State
Jenna Anderson	Missouri State
Hailey Chambliss	Missouri State
Jamie Skarupsky	Murray State
Audrey Henry	Murray State
Tori Schrimpf	Murray State
Caitlin Richards	UNI
Lizzie Mewes	UNI
Allie Anderson	Valparaiso
Nicole Norfolk	Valparaiso
Sam DeJulio	Southern Illinois
Vianey Lopez	Drake
Riley Collett	UIC
Claire Fallon	Belmont

MVP in bold
