= 2022 Big West Conference women's soccer tournament =

- Classification: Division I
- Teams: 6
- Matches: 5
- Attendance: 3,198
- Site: Mustang Memorial Field (Semifinals & Final); San Luis Obispo, California
- Champions: UC Irvine (3rd title)
- Winning coach: Scott Juniper (2nd title)
- MVP: Glo Hinojosa (UC Irvine)
- Broadcast: ESPN+

2022 Big West Conference women's soccer standings
	Conf.						Overall
Team	W		L		T	PCT	W		L		T	PCT
Cal Poly ‍†‍‍	6	–	1	–	3	.750	9	–	7	–	3	.553
UC Davis ‍‍‍	6	–	2	–	2	.700	9	–	6	–	4	.579
Cal State Fullerton ‍‍‍	6	–	2	–	2	.700	9	–	6	–	5	.575
Long Beach St ‍‍‍	5	–	2	–	3	.650	8	–	7	–	6	.524
UC Santa Barbara ‍‍‍	4	–	3	–	3	.550	5	–	9	–	6	.400
No. 18 UC Irvine ‍‍‡‍^{y}	3	–	2	–	5	.550	11	–	6	–	7	.604
Hawaii ‍‍‍	3	–	4	–	3	.450	6	–	6	–	3	.500
Cal State Bakersfield ‍‍‍	2	–	3	–	5	.450	4	–	8	–	6	.389
UC San Diego ‍‍‍	2	–	4	–	4	.400	3	–	10	–	6	.316
Cal State Northridge ‍‍‍	1	–	8	–	1	.150	3	–	15	–	1	.184
UC Riverside ‍‍‍	0	–	7	–	3	.150	2	–	9	–	7	.306
† – Conference champion ‡ – 2022 Big West Tournament champion y – Invited to the NCAA Tournament; As of December 6, 2022; Rankings from United Soccer Coaches Poll; Source:The Big West Conference

The 2022 Big West Conference women's soccer tournament was the postseason women's soccer tournament for the Big West Conference held from October 30 to November 6, 2022. The Semifinals and Final of the five-match tournament took place at Mustang Memorial Field in San Luis Obispo, California and the higher seed hosted First Round games. The six-team single-elimination tournament consisted of three rounds based on seeding from regular season conference play. This was the first season that the tournament expanded to six teams, as it had only previously invited the top four teams. The defending champions were the UC Irvine Anteaters. The Anteaters successfully defended their title, defeating Long Beach State 3–0 in the Final. This was the third Big West tournament title for the UC Irvine program and the second for head coach Scott Juniper. As tournament champions, UC Irvine earned the Big West's automatic berth into the 2022 NCAA Division I women's soccer tournament.

== Seeding ==
The top six teams in the regular season earned a spot in the tournament and teams were seeded by regular season conference record. A tiebreaker was required to determine the second and third seed and who would get a First Round bye. UC Davis and Cal State Fullerton both finished with identical 6–2–2 regular season records. UC Davis earned the second seed and First Round bye by virtue of their 2–1 home victory over Cal State Fullerton on October 20.

Seed	School	Conference Record	Points
1	Cal Poly	6–1–3	21
2	UC Davis	6–2–2	20
3	Cal State Fullerton	6–2–2	20
4	Long Beach State	5–2–3	18
5	UC Santa Barbara	4–3–3	15
6	UC Irvine	3–2–5	14

== Bracket ==
First round Saturday, Oct. 30
4	Long Beach State (a.e.t.)	2
5	UC Santa Barbara	1
3	Cal State Fullerton	0
6	UC Irvine (a.e.t.)	2

Semifinals; Thursday, Nov. 3
1	Cal Poly	0
4	Long Beach State	1
2	UC Davis	0
6	UC Irvine (a.e.t.)	1

Final; Sunday, Nov. 6
4	Long Beach State	0
6	UC Irvine	3

== Schedule ==
=== Quarterfinals ===
October 30	#3 Cal State Fullerton	0–2 (a.e.t.)	#6 UC Irvine	Fullerton, CA
5:00 p.m.	Kaya Hawkinson (yellow card) 20'; Malina Yago (yellow card) 40'; Samantha McKenna (yellow card) 60'	Report	(yellow card) 65' Maddy Chzvez; (yellow card) 74' Kiera Smeenge; (yellow card) 81' Lilli Rask; 95' Suus de Bakker; 102' Destinee Manzo	Stadium: Titan Stadium; Attendance: 737; Referee: Adrian Gonzalez; Assistant referees: Nathan Max; Israel Fernandez; Fourth official: Isaac Cisneros

October 30	#4 Long Beach State	2–1 (a.e.t.)	#5 UC Santa Barbara	Long Beach, CA
6:00 p.m.	Lena Silano 47', 92'; Cherrie Cox (yellow card) 100'	Report	82' Lauren Helwig	Stadium: George Allen Field; Attendance: 370; Referee: William Hoffman; Assistant referees: Yoel Miller; Melissa Gonzalez; Fourth official: Cesar Calderon

=== Semifinals ===
November 3	#2 UC Davis	0–1 (a.e.t.)	#6 UC Irvine	San Luis Obispo, CA
4:00 p.m.	Chandler Connors (yellow card) 79'; Sarah Canavan (yellow card) 79'	Report	(yellow card) 77' Alex Jaquez; 108' Alyssa Moore; (yellow card) 110' Aislynn Crowder; (yellow card) 110' Team	Stadium: Mustang Memorial Field; Attendance: 484; Referee: Bernhard Hosu; Assistant referees: John Pranjic; Adam Zarrin; Fourth official: Misael Lopez

November 3	#1 Cal Poly	0–1	#4 Long Beach State	San Luis Obispo, CA
7:00 p.m.	Camille Lafaix (yellow card) 64'	Report	62' Summer Laskey	Stadium: Mustang Memorial Field; Attendance: 1,122; Referee: Alex Del Angel; Assistant referees: Gabriel Salazar; Chris Gomez; Fourth official: John Pranjic

=== Final ===
November 6	#4 Long Beach State	0–3	#6 UC Irvine	San Luis Obispo, CA
1:00 p.m.	Elysia Laramie (yellow card) 54'; Sophie Jones (yellow card) 88'	Report	8' Erin Covey; (yellow card) 32' Alex Jaquez; 35' Suus de Bakker; 42' Autumn Thompkins; (yellow card) 87' Kiera Smeenge	Stadium: Mustang Memorial Field; Attendance: 485; Referee: Rene Nunez; Assistant referees: Salma Perez; Yoel Miller; Fourth official: Salvador Reyes

== Statistics ==
=== Goalscorers ===
There were 10 goals scored in 5 matches, for an average of 2 goals per match (as of November 6, 2022).

2 goals

- Lena Silano – Long Beach State
- Suus de Bakker – UC Irvine

1 goal

- Summer Laskey – Long Beach State
- Erin Covey – UC Irvine
- Destinee Manzo – UC Irvine
- Alyssa Moore – UC Irvine
- Autumn Thompkins – UC Irvine
- Lauren Helwig – UC Santa Barbara
