= 2022 Big South Conference women's soccer tournament =

- Classification: Division I
- Teams: 4
- Matches: 3
- Attendance: 685
- Site: Sportsplex at Matthews; Matthews, North Carolina
- Champions: Radford (8th title)
- Winning coach: Ben Sohrabi (8th title)
- MVP: Helena Willson (Radford)
- Broadcast: ESPN+

2022 Big South Conference women's soccer standings
	Conf.						Overall
Team	W		L		T	PCT	W		L		T	PCT
Campbell ‍†‍‍	7	–	0	–	2	.889	11	–	3	–	4	.722
Radford ‍‍‡‍^{y}	6	–	2	–	1	.722	12	–	4	–	4	.700
USC Upstate ‍‍‍	6	–	2	–	1	.722	9	–	5	–	4	.611
Gardner-Webb ‍‍‍	4	–	3	–	2	.556	9	–	7	–	5	.548
High Point ‍‍‍	4	–	4	–	1	.500	5	–	10	–	3	.361
Charleston Southern ‍‍‍	3	–	3	–	3	.500	5	–	8	–	4	.412
Longwood ‍‍‍	2	–	5	–	2	.333	5	–	9	–	4	.389
UNC Asheville ‍‍‍	2	–	6	–	1	.278	4	–	10	–	3	.324
Presbyterian ‍‍‍	2	–	6	–	1	.278	2	–	12	–	3	.206
Winthrop ‍‍‍	1	–	6	–	2	.222	4	–	8	–	3	.367
† – Conference champion ‡ – 2022 Big South Tournament champion y – Invited to the NCAA Tournament; As of December 6, 2022; Rankings from United Soccer Coaches Poll; Source:Big South Conference

The 2022 Big South Conference women's soccer tournament was the postseason women's soccer tournament for the Big South Conference held from November 3 through November 6, 2022. The tournament was hosted by the Sportsplex at Matthews in Matthews, North Carolina. The four team-team single-elimination tournament consisted of two rounds based on seeding from regular season conference play. High Point were the defending champions, and they were unable to defend their crown, as they failed to qualify for the tournament, finishing in fifth place. Radford won the tournament with a 3–0 victory over USC Upstate in the Final. The conference tournament title was the eighth for the Radford women's soccer program, all of which have come under head coach Ben Sohrabi. As tournament champions, Radford earned the Big South's automatic berth into the 2022 NCAA Division I women's soccer tournament.

== Seeding ==
The top four teams in the regular season earned a spot in the tournament. A tiebreaker was required to determine the second and third seeds as USC Upstate and Radford both finished with identical 6–2–1 conference regular season records. USC Upstate earned the second seed by virtue of their 2–0 victory over Radford on October 4.

Seed	School	Conference Record	Points
1	Campbell	7–0–2	23
2	USC Upstate	6–2–1	19
3	Radford	6–2–1	19
4	Gardner-Webb	4–3–2	14

== Bracket ==
Semifinals; Thursday, Nov. 3
1	Campbell	1 (3)
4	Gardner-Webb (pen.)	1 (4)
2	USC Upstate	0
3	Radford	1

Final; Sunday, Nov. 6
4	Gardner-Webb	0
3	Radford	3

== Schedule ==
=== Semifinals ===
November 3	#1 Campbell	1–1 (a.e.t.) (3–4 p)	#4 Gardner-Webb	Matthews, NC
4:05 p.m. ET	Cazzi Norgren 40'	Report	73', (yellow card) 95' Lea Gossett	Stadium: Sportsplex at Matthews; Attendance: 185
	Penalties
	Jessica Donald (penalty scored); Jackie Richards (penalty scored); Delaney Baumbick (penalty missed); Kaleigh Backlund (penalty scored); Cazzi Norgren (penalty missed)		(penalty missed) Marina Bradic; (penalty scored) Maddie Turlington; (penalty scored) Alli Varga; (penalty scored) Lea Gossett; (penalty scored) Klara Ovefelt

November 3	#2 USC Upstate	0–1	#3 Radford	Matthews, NC
7:45 p.m. ET	Adrianna Pepe (yellow card) 17'	Report	61' Amy Swain	Stadium: Sportsplex at Matthews; Attendance: 150

=== Final ===
November 6	#3 Radford	3–0	#4 Gardner-Webb	Matthews, NC
1:05 p.m. ET	Helena Willson 5'; Katelyn O'Donnell 58'; Kat Parris 63'	Report	(yellow card) 37' Lea Gossett	Stadium: Sportsplex at Matthews; Attendance: 350

== Statistics ==
=== Goalscorers ===
There were 6 goals scored in 3 matches, for an average of 2 goals per match (as of November 6, 2022).

1 goal

- Cazzi Norgren – Campbell
- Lea Gossett – Gardner-Webb
- Katelyn O'Donnell – Radford
- Kat Parris – Radford
- Amy Swain – Radford
- Helena Willson – Radford

== All-Tournament team ==
Player	Team
**Helena Willson**	Radford
Amy Swain	Radford
Katelyn O'Donnell	Radford
Jillian Silverstone	Radford
Carina Leal	Gardner-Webb
Alli Varga	Gardner-Webb
Marina Bradic	Gardner-Webb
Cora Brendle	USC Upstate
Emily Sanders	USC Upstate
Mary Tierney	Campbell
Cazzi Norgren	Campbell

MVP in bold
