= 2022 Ohio Valley Conference women's soccer tournament =

- Classification: Division I
- Teams: 8
- Matches: 7
- Attendance: 2,827
- Site: Tech Soccer Field; Cookeville, Tennessee (Semifinals & Final)
- Champions: SIU Edwardsville (5th title)
- Winning coach: Derek Burton (5th title)
- MVP: Sidney Christopher (SIU Edwardsville)
- Broadcast: ESPN+

2022 Ohio Valley Conference women's soccer standings
	Conf.						Overall
Team	W		L		T	PCT	W		L		T	PCT
Tennessee Tech ‍†‍‍	5	–	0	–	3	.813	8	–	5	–	5	.583
SIUE ‍‍‡‍^{y}	5	–	1	–	2	.750	8	–	6	–	4	.556
SEMO ‍‍‍	4	–	2	–	2	.625	8	–	6	–	3	.559
Morehead St. ‍‍‍	4	–	2	–	2	.625	7	–	7	–	4	.500
Lindenwood ‍‍‍	2	–	2	–	4	.500	6	–	8	–	6	.450
Little Rock ‍‍‍	2	–	3	–	3	.438	5	–	7	–	5	.441
Southern Indiana ‍‍‍	1	–	5	–	2	.250	5	–	8	–	4	.412
UT Martin ‍‍‍	1	–	5	–	2	.250	4	–	9	–	5	.361
Eastern Illinois ‍‍‍	0	–	4	–	4	.250	2	–	6	–	8	.375
† – Conference champion ‡ – 2022 OVC Tournament champion y – Invited to the NCAA Tournament; As of December 6, 2022; Rankings from United Soccer Coaches Poll; Source:Ohio Valley Conference

The 2022 Ohio Valley Conference women's soccer tournament was the postseason women's soccer tournament for the Ohio Valley Conference held from October 28 through November 6, 2022. The first round and quarterfinals of the tournament were held at campus sites hosted by the #3 and #4 seeds, while the semifinals and final took place at Tech Soccer Field in Cookeville, Tennessee. The eight-team single-elimination tournament consisted of four rounds based on seeding from regular season conference play. The SIU Edwardsville Cougars were the defending champions and successfully defended their crown by defeating top seeded Tennessee Tech in the final. The conference tournament title was the fifth for the SIU Edwardsville women's soccer program, all of which have come under head coach Derek Burton. This was also the third straight title for SIU Edwardsville. As tournament champions, SIU Edwardsville earned the Ohio Valley's automatic berth into the 2022 NCAA Division I Women's Soccer Tournament.

== Seeding ==
Eight of the nine teams in the Ohio Valley Conference qualified for the 2022 Tournament. The #1 seed was awarded as the host institution for the Semifinals and Finals of the tournament. The #1 and #2 seed received byes to the Semifinals, while the #4 and #5 seeds received byes to the Quarterfinals. Seems were seeded based on regular season records. A tiebreaker was required to determine the third and fourth seeds as Morehead State and Southeast Missouri both finished the regular season with 4–2–2 records. After the tiebreaker procedure, Morehead state was determined to be the third seed, while Southeast Missouri was the fourth seed. A second tiebreaker was required for the seventh and eight seeds as both UT Martin and Southern Indiana finished with 1–5–2 regular season records. UT Martin won the regular season matchup between the teams 1–0 and therefore were the seventh seed, while Southern Indiana was the eighth seed.

Seed	School	Conference Record	Points
1	Tennessee Tech	5–0–3	18
2	SIU Edwardsville	5–1–2	17
3	Morehead State	4–2–2	14
4	Southeast Missouri	4–2–2	14
5	Lindenwood	2–2–4	10
6	Little Rock	2–3–3	9
7	UT Martin	1–5–2	5
8	Southern Indiana	1–5–2	5

== Bracket ==
First round Friday, Oct. 28
5	Lindenwood	2
8	Southern Indiana	1
6	Little Rock	0
7	UT Martin	1

Quarterfinals; Sunday, Oct. 30
4	Southeast Missouri	1 (0)
5	Lindenwood (pen.)	1 (2)
3	Morehead State	0 (4)
7	UT Martin	0 (3)

Semifinals; Friday, Nov. 4
1	Tennessee Tech	5
5	Lindenwood	0
2	SIU Edwardsville	2
3	Morehead State	0

Final; Sunday, Nov. 6
1	Tennessee Tech	0
2	SIU Edwardsville	1

== Schedule ==
=== First round ===
October 28	#5 Lindenwood	2–1	#8 Southern Indiana	Cape Girardeau, MO
4:00 p.m. CT	Lily Sutter 11'; Maggie Weller 56'; Lauren Tyson (yellow card) 85'	Report	61' Mia Rose Daly; (yellow card) 70' Peyton Murphy	Stadium: Houck Stadium; Attendance: 263; Referee: Wes Caouette; Assistant referees: Robert Musoiu; Jeff Pulley; Fourth official: Jose Renda

October 28	#6 Little Rock	0–1	#7 UT Martin	Morehead, KY
5:00 p.m. CT	Team (yellow card) 90'	Report	62' Nyeemah Prescod-Beckles	Stadium: MSU Soccer Field; Attendance: 100

=== Quarterfinals ===
October 30	#3 Morehead State	0–0 (a.e.t.) (4–3 p)	#7 UT Martin	Morehead, KY
12:00 p.m. CT	Nicole Fiantaco (yellow card) 100'	Report	(yellow card) 86' Nyeemah Prescod-Beckles	Stadium: MSU Soccer Field; Attendance: 265
	Penalties
	Hadley Cytron (penalty scored); Kate Larbes (penalty scored); Sejla Podzic (penalty missed); Erin Fite (penalty scored); Anna Lohrer (penalty scored)		(penalty missed) Catey Hunt; (penalty scored) Hannah Zahn; (penalty scored) Emma Elliott; (penalty scored) Ryann Mushkin; (penalty missed) Alba Delgado

October 30	#4 Southeast Missouri	1–1 (a.e.t.) (0–2 p)	#5 Lindenwood	Cape Girardeau, MO
1:00 p.m. CT	Emma Tucker 7'	Report	35' Jacqueline Baetz; (yellow card) 48' Eyglo Thorsteinsdottir	Stadium: Houck Stadium; Attendance: 432; Referee: Donald Huber; Assistant referees: Don Tebeau; Jeffery Hay; Fourth official: Anna Wawrzyniak
	Penalties
	Zoe Houston (penalty missed); Natalie Jackson (penalty missed); Emma Brune (penalty missed); Cayla Koerner (penalty missed)		(penalty missed) Eyglo Thorsteinsdottir; (penalty scored) Jacqueline Baetz; (penalty scored) Jill Wipke

=== Semifinals ===
November 4	#1 Tennessee Tech	5–0	#5 Lindenwood	Cookeville, TN
4:00 p.m. CT	Bailey Taylor 27'; Chloe Smith 29', 46', 57'; Taylor Clark 85'	Report	(yellow card) 85' Rachel Jackson; (yellow card) 89' Jill Wipke	Stadium: Tech Soccer Field; Attendance: 722; Referee: Jaclyn Williams; Assistant referees: Michael Samour; Lucy Bell; Fourth official: Douglas Palomaki

November 4	#2 SIU Edwardsville	2–0	#3 Southeast Missouri	Cookeville, TN
7:00 p.m. CT	Sarah Magnoni (yellow card) 20'; Team (yellow card) 59'; Mary Wessel 68'; Maria Haro 90'	Report		Stadium: Tech Soccer Field; Referee: Don Eubank; Assistant referees: Mandi Phillips Burle; Douglas Palomaki; Fourth official: Jessica Medley

=== Final ===
November 6	#1 Tennessee Tech	0–1	#2 SIU Edwardsville	Cookeville, TN
1:00 p.m. CT	Emily Carlevato (yellow card) 55'	Report	55' Sidney Christopher; (yellow card) 86' Sarah Magnoni	Stadium: Tech Soccer Field; Attendance: 1,045; Referee: James Sherer; Assistant referees: Devin Bargatze; David Curley; Fourth official: Adam Warner

== Statistics ==
=== Goalscorers ===
There were 14 goals scored in 7 matches, for an average of 2 goals per match (as of November 6, 2022).

3 goals

- Chloe Smith – Tennessee Tech

1 goal

- Jacqueline Baetz – Lindenwood
- Lily Sutter – Lindenwood
- Maggie Weller – Lindenwood
- Sidney Christopher – SIU Edwardsville
- Maria Haro – SIU Edwardsville
- Mary Wessel – SIU Edwardsville
- Emma Tucker – Southeast Missouri
- Mia Rose Daly – Southern Indiana
- Taylor Clark – Tennessee Tech
- Bailey Taylor – Tennessee Tech
- Nyeemah Prescod-Beckles – UT Martin

== All-Tournament team ==
Player	Team
Jacqueline Baetz	Lindenwood
Sam Blazek	Lindenwood
Anna Lohrer	Morehead State
Avery Redmond	Morehead State
Macy Carter	Tennessee Tech
Chloe Smith	Tennessee Tech
Bailey Taylor	Tennessee Tech
**Sidney Christopher**	SIU Edwardsville
Sarah Magnoni	SIU Edwardsville
Taylor Spiller	SIU Edwardsville
Mary Wessel	SIU Edwardsville

MVP in bold
