= 2022 American Athletic Conference women's soccer tournament =

- Classification: Division I
- Teams: 6
- Matches: 5
- Attendance: 1,307
- Site: UCF Soccer and Track Stadium; Orlando, Florida
- Champions: Memphis (3rd title)
- Winning coach: Brooks Monaghan (3rd title)
- MVP: Shae Taylor (Offensive); Claire Wyville (Defensive) (Memphis)
- Broadcast: ESPN+ ESPNNews (Final)

2022 American Athletic Conference women's soccer standings
	Conf.						Overall
Team	W		L		T	PCT	W		L		T	PCT
No. 23т UCF ‍†‍‍^{y}	7	–	0	–	1	.938	9	–	2	–	7	.694
South Florida ‍‍‍	5	–	3	–	0	.625	8	–	9	–	0	.471
Cincinnati ‍‍‍	3	–	1	–	4	.625	7	–	3	–	7	.618
No. 21 Memphis ‍‍‡‍^{y}	3	–	2	–	3	.563	11	–	5	–	6	.636
East Carolina ‍‍‍	3	–	3	–	2	.500	8	–	8	–	3	.500
SMU ‍‍‍	3	–	3	–	2	.500	10	–	4	–	5	.658
Tulsa ‍‍‍	2	–	4	–	2	.375	7	–	7	–	3	.500
Houston ‍‍‍	2	–	4	–	2	.375	6	–	7	–	3	.469
Temple ‍‍‍	0	–	8	–	0	.000	1	–	11	–	4	.188
† – Conference champion ‡ – 2022 AAC Tournament champion y – Invited to the NCAA Tournament; As of December 6, 2022; Rankings from United Soccer Coaches Poll; Source:American Athletic Conference

The 2022 American Athletic Conference women's soccer tournament was the postseason women's soccer tournament for the American Athletic Conference held from October 30 to November 6, 2022. The first round was hosted by the higher seed, and the Semifinals and Final took place at the home field of the regular season champion UCF. The six-team single-elimination tournament consisted of three rounds based on seeding from regular season conference play. The Memphis Tigers are the defending tournament champions. Memphis successfully defended its title, defeating East Carolina in the First Round, first-seed UCF in the Semifinals and SMU in the Final. Memphis' win was the program's third and also the third for coach Brooks Monaghan. As tournament champions, Memphis earned the American's automatic berth into the 2022 NCAA Division I Women's Soccer Tournament.

== Seeding ==
The top six teams in the regular season earned a spot in the tournament. A tiebreaker was required to determine the fifth and sixth seeds for the tournament as East Carolina and SMU both finished the regular season with identical 3–3–2 records. East Carolina earned the fifth seed by virtue of their 2–1 regular season win at SMU on September 15, 2022.

Seed	School	Conference Record	Points
1	UCF	7–0–1	22
2	South Florida	5–3–0	15
3	Cincinnati	3–1–4	13
4	Memphis	3–2–3	12
5	East Carolina	3–3–2	11
6	SMU	3–3–2	11

== Bracket ==
First Round; Sunday, Oct. 30
3	Cincinnati	0
6	SMU	1
4	Memphis (a.e.t.)	1
5	East Carolina	0

Semifinals; Thursday, Nov. 3
2	South Florida	0
6	SMU	5
1	UCF	1 (5)
4	Memphis (pen.)	1 (6)

Final; Sunday, Nov. 6
6	SMU	0
4	Memphis (a.e.t.)	1

== Schedule ==
=== First Round ===
October 30	#3 Cincinnati	0–1	#6 SMU	Cincinnati, OH
1:00 p.m.	Maddie Thiss (yellow card) 16'; Team (yellow card) 81'	Report	(yellow card) 28' Abby Dermott; (yellow card) 49' Jewel Boland; (yellow card) 55', (goal) 70' (pen.) Courtney Sebazco; (yellow card) 90' Sophie King	Stadium: Gettler Stadium; Attendance: 362; Referee: Emma Richards; Assistant referees: Stephen Milhoan; Jeremiah Jemison; Fourth official: Dean Morgan

October 30	#4 Memphis	1–0 (a.e.t.)	#5 East Carolina	Memphis, TN
2:00 p.m.	Mya Jones 99'; Team (yellow card) 109'	Report	(yellow card) 30' Carsen Parker; (yellow card) 51' Abby Sowa	Stadium: Murphy Track & Soccer Complex; Attendance: 177; Referee: Alexandra Billeter; Assistant referees: Ryan Starr; Laura Chambers Waliski; Fourth official: Donovan Eubank

=== Semifinals ===
November 3	#2 South Florida	0–5	#6 SMU	Orlando, FL
4:00 p.m.	Georgia Brown (yellow card) 80'	Report	7', 25' Sammy Nieves; 19', 48' Wayny Balata; 52' Jewel Boland; (yellow card) 87' Sophie King	Stadium: UCF Soccer and Track Stadium; Attendance: 150; Referee: Jaclyn Metz; Assistant referees: Erika Barahona; Albert Franklin; Fourth official: Sebastian Ocampo

November 3	#1 UCF	1–1 (a.e.t.) (5–6 p)	#4 Memphis	Orlando, FL
7:00 p.m.	Anna Henderson 34'; Sanja Homann (yellow card) 48'; Dayana Martin (yellow card) 72'; Mallory Olsson (yellow card) 97'	Report	62' Lilly Huber; (yellow card) 79' Kimberly Smit	Stadium: UCF Soccer and Track Stadium; Attendance: 448; Referee: Alyssa Nichols; Assistant referees: Kendall McCardell; Sanitago Roa; Fourth official: Matt Miscannon
	Penalties
	Katie Bradley (penalty scored); Mia Asenjo (penalty missed); Sanja Homann (penalty scored); Kristen Scott (penalty scored); Darya Rajaee (penalty scored); Ariel Young (penalty scored); Georgia Eaton-Collins (penalty missed)		(penalty scored) Momo Kakao; (penalty scored) Eef Kerkhof; (penalty scored) Lilly Huber; (penalty scored) Anne-Valérie Seto; (penalty missed) Kimberly Smit; (penalty scored) Mya Jones; (penalty scored) Zoe May

=== Final ===
November 6	#4 Memphis	1–0 (a.e.t.)	#6 SMU	Orlando, FL
1:00 p.m.	Peyton Felton (yellow card) 51'; Lilly Huber (yellow card) 58'; Shae Taylor 99'	Report	(yellow card) 55' Jewel Boland; (yellow card) 64' Abby Dermott	Stadium: UCF Soccer and Track Stadium; Attendance: 170; Referee: Meghan Mullen; Assistant referees: Kendall McCardell; AJ Franklin; Fourth official: Jaclyn Metz

== Statistics ==
=== Goalscorers ===
There were 10 goals scored in 5 matches, for an average of 2 goals per match (as of November 6, 2022).

2 goals

- Wayny Balata – SMU
- Sammy Nieves – SMU

1 goal

- Jewel Boland – SMU
- Courtney Sebazco – SMU
- Lilly Huber – Memphis
- Mya Jones – Memphis
- Shae Taylor – Memphis
- Anna Henderson – UCF

== All-Tournament team ==
Player	Team
Anna Henderson	UCF
Kristen Scott	UCF
Wayny Balata	SMU
Payton Doiron	SMU
Sammy Nieves	SMU
Courtney Sebazco	SMU
Lilly Huber	Memphis
Haylee Spray	Memphis
Grace Stordy	Memphis
Shae Taylor*	Memphis
Claire Wyville^	Memphis

* Offensive MVP
^ Defensive MVP
