= 2022 Patriot League women's soccer tournament =

Postseason women's soccer tournament for the Patriot League

- Classification: Division I
- Teams: 6
- Matches: 5
- Attendance: 2,128
- Site: Campus Sites, Higher seed
- Champions: Bucknell (6th title)
- Winning coach: Kelly Cook (4 title)
- MVP: Rylee Donaldson (Bucknell)
- Broadcast: ESPN+ CBS Sports Network (Final)

2022 Patriot League women's soccer standings
	Conf.						Overall
Team	W		L		T	PCT	W		L		T	PCT
Army ‍†‍‍	6	–	1	–	2	.778	9	–	4	–	7	.625
Bucknell ‍‍‡‍^{y}	5	–	1	–	3	.722	8	–	6	–	6	.550
Boston U ‍‍‍	6	–	3	–	0	.667	11	–	8	–	1	.575
Lehigh ‍‍‍	5	–	2	–	2	.667	8	–	7	–	3	.528
Navy ‍‍‍	4	–	5	–	0	.444	8	–	8	–	3	.500
Loyola (MD) ‍‍‍	3	–	4	–	2	.444	6	–	8	–	4	.444
Colgate ‍‍‍	3	–	4	–	2	.444	3	–	10	–	4	.294
American ‍‍‍	2	–	5	–	2	.333	3	–	6	–	6	.400
Holy Cross ‍‍‍	2	–	6	–	1	.278	2	–	11	–	4	.235
Lafayette ‍‍‍	1	–	6	–	2	.222	3	–	11	–	3	.265
† – Conference champion ‡ – 2022 Patriot League tournament champion y – Invited to the NCAA Tournament; As of December 6, 2022; Rankings from United Soccer Coaches Poll; Source:Patriot League

The 2022 Patriot League women's soccer tournament was the postseason women's soccer tournament for the Patriot League held from October 30 through November 6, 2022. The tournament was held at campus sites, with the higher seeded team hosting. The six-team single-elimination tournament consisted of three rounds based on seeding from regular season conference play. The defending champions were the Bucknell Bison. Bucknell successfully defended their title, defeating regular season champions Army, who were the #1 seed, in a penalty shootout in the final. The conference championship was the sixth for the Bucknell women's soccer program, four of which have come under head coach Kelly Cook. As tournament champions, Bucknell earned the Patriot League's automatic berth into the 2022 NCAA Division I Women's Soccer Tournament.

== Seeding ==
Seeding was based on regular season play with the top six teams qualifying for the tournament. The top two seeds received a bye to the Semifinals of the tournament and the higher seed hosted each match. A tiebreaker was required to determine the second and third seeds as both Bucknell and Boston University finished with eighteen points after regular season play. Bucknell won the regular season matchup between the two teams, so they were the second seed and earned the bye to the semifinals, while Boston University was the third seed. A tiebreaker was required to determine who the sixth and final team to make the tournament would be, as Loyola (MD) and Colgate both finished with 3–4–2 records in the regular season. Loyola (MD) won their regular season match-up 1–0 and earned the final spot in the tournament.

Seed	School	Conference Record	Points
1	Army	6–1–2	20
2	Bucknell	5–1–3	18
3	Boston University	6–3–0	18
4	Lehigh	5–2–2	17
5	Navy	4–5–0	12
6	Loyola (MD)	3–4–2	11

== Bracket ==
Quarterfinals; Sunday, Oct. 30
3	Boston University	3
6	Loyola (MD)	0
4	Lehigh	4
5	Navy	0

Semifinals; Thursday, Nov. 3
1	Army	2
4	Lehigh	0
2	Bucknell (pen.)	0 (4)
3	Boston University	0 (3)

Final; Sunday, Nov. 6
1	Army	0 (1)
2	Bucknell (pen.)	0 (3)

== Schedule ==
=== Quarterfinals ===
October 30	#3 Boston University	3–0	#6 Loyola (MD)	Boston, MA
2:00 p.m. ET	Eileen Solomon 14'; Lily Matthews 21'; Abigail McNulty 52'; Jenna Oldham (yellow card) 56'	Report	(yellow card) 58' Sarah Mirr; (yellow card) 85' Delaney DeMartino	Stadium: Nickerson Field; Attendance: 210; Referee: Randall Kelley; Assistant referees: Hayley Morway; Jessica Carnevale; Fourth official: Elizabeth McDonald

October 30	#4 Lehigh	4–0	#5 Navy	Bethlehem, PA
7:00 p.m. ET	Ryelle Shuey 24', 32'; Corinne Lyght 50'; Chloe Sherman 80'	Report		Stadium: Ulrich Sports Complex; Attendance: 317; Referee: Joshua Encarnacion; Assistant referees: Elena Dauphinais; Joseph Paolini; Fourth official: Matthew Falk

=== Semifinals ===
November 3	#1 Army	2–0	#4 Lehigh	West Point, NY
6:00 p.m. ET	Lindsey Smith 20'; Brigid Duffy 63'	Report		Stadium: Clinton Field; Attendance: 350; Referee: Thomas Snyder; Assistant referees: Justen Lopez; Lauren Miller; Fourth official: Christopher Crocker

November 3	#2 Bucknell	0–0 (a.e.t.) (4–3 p)	#3 Boston University	Lewisburg, PA
7:00 p.m. ET	Henna Andican (yellow card) 43'; Petie Nassetta (yellow card) 98'	Report	(yellow card) 65' Morgan Fagan	Stadium: Emmitt Field; Attendance: 601; Referee: Nick Karnovsky; Assistant referees: Dustin Killick; Scarlet Agrawal; Fourth official: Jessica Moretti
	Penalties
	Hannah Stuck (penalty missed); Jenna Hall (penalty scored); Teresa Deda (penalty scored); Meghan White (penalty scored); Rylee Donaldson (penalty scored)		(penalty missed) Julianna Stureman; (penalty scored) Margy Porta; (penalty scored) Amy Thompson; (penalty missed) Abigail McNulty; (penalty scored) Jenna Oldham

=== Final ===
November 6	#1 Army	0–0 (a.e.t.) (1–3 p)	#2 Bucknell	West Point, NY
2:00 p.m. ET	Emma Richey (yellow card) 72'	Report		Stadium: Clinton Field; Attendance: 650; Referee: Lee Suckle; Assistant referees: Victoria Catanzaro; Alexandru Foeca; Fourth official: David Bork
	Penalties
	Lauren Drysdale (penalty scored); Cami Silvestro (penalty missed); Brigid Dufy (penalty missed); Kaitlin Palaian (penalty missed)		(penalty missed) Hannah Stuck; (penalty missed) Henna Hall; (penalty scored) Teresa Deda; (penalty scored) Meghan White; (penalty scored) Rylee Donaldson

== Statistics ==
=== Goalscorers ===
There were 9 goals scored in 5 matches, for an average of 1.8 goals per match (as of November 6, 2022).

2 goals

- Rylee Shuey – Lehigh

1 goal

- Brigid Duffy – Army
- Lindsey Smith – Army
- Lily Matthews – Boston University
- Abigail McNulty – Boston University
- Eileen Solomon – Boston University
- Corinne Lyght – Lehigh
- Chloe Sherman – Lehigh

== All-Tournament team ==
Player	Team
Teresa Deda	Bucknell
**Rylee Donaldson**	Bucknell
Jenna Hall	Bucknell
Megan White	Bucknell
Brigid Duffy	Army
Lauren Drysdale	Army
Emma Richey	Army
Abby McNulty	Boston University
Jenna Oldham	Boston University
Corinne Lyght	Lehigh
Ryelle Shuey	Lehigh

MVP in bold
