= Troy Fabiano =

American soccer player and coach

- Fabiano coaching the Kentucky Wildcats in 2026

Personal information
- Date of birth: March 12, 1972 (age 54)
- Place of birth: Kenosha, Wisconsin, U.S.
- Positions: Forward; defender

College career
Years	Team	Apps	(Gls)
1990–1993	Robert Morris Colonials		

Senior career*
Years	Team	Apps	(Gls)
1994	Pittsburgh Stingers (indoor)	26	(4)
- Milwaukee Rampage
1996–1997	Milwaukee Wave (indoor)	9	(0)

Managerial career
- Robert Morris University (assistant)
- 1995: Eastern Illinois Panthers
- 1996: University of Wisconsin–Parkside (assistant)
- 1997–2014: University of Wisconsin–Parkside
- 2015–2021: University of Wisconsin–Milwaukee
- 2022–: Kentucky
- * Club domestic league appearances and goals

Troy Fabiano is a retired American soccer player who is currently the head coach with the Kentucky Wildcats's women's soccer team. He played professionally in the National Professional Soccer League, Continental Indoor Soccer League and USISL.

== Player ==
Fabiano grew up in Kenosha, Wisconsin where he attended and played soccer at Mary D. Bradford High School. He played collegiate soccer at Robert Morris University in Pennsylvania from 1990 to 1993. He graduated in 1994 with a bachelor's degree in communications. He was inducted into the RMU Athletic Hall of Fame in 2001. In December 1993, the Milwaukee Wave selected Fabiano in the fourth round of the National Professional Soccer League amateur draft. However, he did not sign with them. In 1994, he signed with the Pittsburgh Stingers of the Continental Indoor Soccer League. On June 21, 1995, the Stingers traded Fabiano and several draft choices to the Seattle SeaDogs in exchange for Tim Wittman. He did not sign with the SeaDogs. He played for the Milwaukee Rampage in the USISL for one season. He also played nine games for the Milwaukee Wave during the 1996–1997 NPSL season.

== Coach ==
Fabiano began his coaching career as an assistant at Robert Morris University. In 1995, he then served as an interim head coach at Eastern Illinois University. In 1996, he became an assistant coach with the University of Wisconsin–Parkside women's team. In 1997, he became the team's head coach.

In 2015 he was hired as the head coach at the University of Wisconsin–Milwaukee. Fabiano enjoyed success while at Wisconsin-Milwaukee posting a 101–16–13 overall record. He won Horizon League Coach of the Year six times and claimed six regular season titles during his seven-year tenure. He also lead the team to qualification for the NCAA Division I Women's Soccer Championship four times.

Fabiano was hired as the head coach at Kentucky prior to the 2022 season.
