= 2022 NCAA Division I women's soccer rankings =

- Season: 2022
- NCAA tournament: 2022
- Preseason No. 1: Florida State
- NCAA Tournament Champions: UCLA
NCAA Division I women's soccer rankings


Two major human polls made up the 2022 NCAA Division I women's soccer rankings: United Soccer Coaches and Top Drawer Soccer.

== Legend ==
	Increase in ranking
	Decrease in ranking
	New to rankings from previous week
Italics	Number of first place votes
(#–#)	Win-loss record
т	Tied with team above or below also with this symbol

== United Soccer Coaches ==
	Preseason Aug 2	Week 1 Aug 23	Week 2 Aug 30	Week 3 Sep 6	Week 4 Sep 13	Week 5 Sep 20	Week 6 Sep 27	Week 7 Oct 4	Week 8 Oct 11	Week 9 Oct 18	Week 10 Oct 25	Week 11 Nov 1	Final Dec 7	
1.	Florida State (5)	North Carolina (2–0–0) (8)	North Carolina (4–0–0) (8)	UCLA (5–0–0) (8)	UCLA (6–0–0) (8)	UCLA (8–0–0) (8)	UCLA (9–0–0) (8)	UCLA (11–0–0) (8)	UCLA (13–0–0) (8)	UCLA (13–1–0) (8)	UCLA (15–1–0) (8)	UCLA (17–1–0) (8)	UCLA (22–2–1) (8)	1.
2.	Duke (2)	Florida State (1–0–1)	Duke (4–0–0)	North Carolina (5–1–0)	North Carolina (7–1–0)	Virginia (8–0–1)	Virginia (9–1–1)	Virginia (10–1–1)	North Carolina (11–3–0)т	North Carolina (12–3–0)	North Carolina (14–3–0)	North Carolina (15–3–0)	North Carolina (20–5–1)	2.
3.	BYU	Rutgers (2–0–0)	UCLA (3–0–0)	Duke (5–1–0)	Duke (5–2–0)	North Carolina (7–2–0)	North Carolina (9–2–0)	Florida State (8–0–2)	Alabama (13–1–1)т	Alabama (14–1–1)	Alabama (16–1–1)	Alabama (17–1–1)	Florida State (17–3–3)	3.
4.	Virginia (1)	South Carolina (1–0–1)	South Carolina (3–0–1)	South Carolina (4–0–2)	Rutgers (8–0–0)	Rutgers (9–0–0)	Duke (8–2–0)	Alabama (11–1–1)	Florida State (9–1–2)	Florida State (10–1–2)	Notre Dame (14–2–0)	Notre Dame (14–2–2)	Alabama (23–3–1)	4.
5.	Santa Clara	Duke (2–0–0)	Virginia (4–0–0)	Virginia (6–0–0)	South Carolina (5–0–3)	Duke (6–2–0)	Alabama (10–1–1)	North Carolina (9–3–0)	Northwestern (11–1–2)	Notre Dame (12–2–0)	Florida State (11–2–2)	Florida State (12–2–2)	Notre Dame (17–3–3)	5.
6.	Rutgers	UCLA (1–0–0)	BYU (2–0–1)т	Rutgers (6–0–0)т	Notre Dame (7–0–0)	Alabama (8–1–1)	Penn State (7–1–2)	Northwestern (10–1–2)	Notre Dame (11–2–0)	Michigan State (13–1–3)	Michigan State (15–1–3)	Michigan State (16–1–3)	Duke (15–5–3)	6.
7.	TCU	TCU (1–0–1)	TCU (3–0–1)т	Stanford (5–0–0)т	Virginia (7–0–1)	Florida State (5–0–2)	Florida State (7–0–2)	Duke (8–3–0)	Arkansas (10–2–1)	Stanford (12–2–1)	Stanford (14–2–1)	Stanford (16–2–1)	Virginia (16–4–3)	7.
8.	Arkansas	Virginia (2–0–0)	Penn State (3–0–1)	Florida State (2–0–2)	Penn State (5–1–1)	South Carolina (5–1–3)	Northwestern (9–1–1)	USC (7–1–1)	Rutgers (12–1–1)	Virginia (10–2–3)	Virginia (12–2–3)	Duke (12–4–2)	Arkansas (13–4–5)	8.
9.	Michigan	BYU (1–0–0)	Rutgers (4–0–0)	Ole Miss (5–0–1)	Stanford (6–1–0)т	Northwestern (7–1–1)	TCU (6–2–3)	Arkansas (8–2–1)	Stanford (11–2–1)	Arkansas (10–3–1)	Arkansas (10–3–3)	Arkansas (11–3–3)	South Carolina (15–4–5)	9.
10.	North Carolina	Penn State (0–0–1)	Florida State (1–0–2)	Pepperdine (4–0–2)	Pepperdine (5–0–2)т	Saint Louis (9–1–0)	Rutgers (10–1–0)	TCU (7–2–3)т	TCU (8–2–4)т	Duke (10–4–0)	Saint Louis (17–1–0)	Saint Louis (18–1–0)	TCU (14–5–5)	10.
11.	Tennessee	Georgetown (1–0–1)	Auburn (2–0–2)	Penn State (4–1–1)	Alabama (6–1–1)	Pepperdine (6–1–2)	Saint Louis (11–1–0)	Rutgers (11–1–1)т	Saint Louis (13–1–0)т	Saint Louis (15–1–0)	Duke (11–4–1)	Virginia (13–3–3)	Northwestern (16–5–2)	11.
12.	South Carolina	Ole Miss (2–0–0)	Stanford (3–0–0)	Notre Dame (5–0–0)	Saint Louis (7–1–0)т	TCU (5–2–2)	Arkansas (7–2–1)	Saint Louis (12–1–0)	Duke (10–3–0)	TCU (9–2–4)	Northwestern (13–3–2)	Northwestern (14–3–2)	Pittsburgh (14–5–3)	12.
13.	UCLA	Stanford (1–0–0)	Ole Miss (3–0–1)	BYU (3–1–1)	Florida State (4–0–2)т	Ole Miss (7–0–2)	Ole Miss (9–0–2)	Pittsburgh (11–1–0)	Virginia (10–2–2)	Northwestern (12–2–2)	BYU (8–2–5)	South Carolina (11–3–4)	Penn State (15–5–3)	13.
14.	Penn State	Pepperdine (2–0–0)	Pepperdine (3–0–1)	Auburn (3–0–3)	Arkansas (5–1–1)	Clemson (5–1–2)	Pittsburgh (10–1–0)	Stanford (9–2–1)	Portland (9–0–4)	Rutgers (13–1–2)	South Carolina (10–3–4)	USC (11–2–3)	BYU (11–3–7)	14.
15.	USC	SMU (1–0–1)	SMU (2–0–1)	Saint Louis (5–1–0)	Ole Miss (6–0–2)	Washington (6–0–2)	Washington State (7–1–1)	Portland (7–0–4)	Michigan State (11–1–3)	USC (9–2–1)	TCU (10–3–4)т	BYU (8–2–6)	Michigan State (18–3–3)	15.
16.	Notre Dame	Auburn (2–0–0)	Notre Dame (4–0–0)	SMU (3–0–2)	Harvard (6–0–0)	Harvard (6–0–1)	Notre Dame (8–2–0)	Ohio State (8–2–2)	Tennessee (9–3–1)	Georgetown (11–1–4)	Georgetown (12–1–5)т	Texas (14–1–4)	Stanford (17–2–3)	16.
17.	Pepperdine	Butler (2–0–0)	Georgetown (1–1–2)	West Virginia (3–1–2)	TCU (5–2–1)	Penn State (5–1–2)	Pepperdine (6–1–2)	Notre Dame (9–2–0)	Georgetown (9–1–4)	Ohio State (10–2–3)	Texas (12–1–4)	TCU (11–3–5)	Texas (15–3–4)	17.
18.	Ole Miss	Clemson (1–0–1)	Texas A&M (3–0–1)	Alabama (4–1–1)	Northwestern (6–1–1)	Notre Dame (7–1–0)	Portland (6–0–4)	Georgetown (8–1–3)	USC (8–2–1)	Tennessee (9–3–2)	USC (9–2–3)	Georgetown (12–1–5)	UC Irvine (11–6–7)	18.
19.	Georgetown	Saint Louis (2–0–0)	Xavier (3–0–1)	Colorado (5–0–1)	SMU (4–0–3)	Stanford (7–1–1)	Georgetown (6–1–3)	Tennessee (7–3–1)	California (8–3–3)	BYU (6–2–5)	Pittsburgh (12–4–1)	Pittsburgh (12–4–3)	Georgetown (15–2–5)	19.
20.	Washington State	Ohio State (2–0–0)	Colorado (3–0–1)	Harvard (4–0–0)	Texas (5–1–1)	Arkansas (5–2–1)	USC (5–1–1)	Ole Miss (9–1–2)	Ohio State (8–2–3)	Pittsburgh (11–3–1)	Rutgers (13–3–2)	UCF (9–2–4)	Saint Louis (20–2–0)	20.
21.	Stanford	West Virginia (1–0–1)	West Virginia (2–1–1)	Texas A&M (4–0–2)	Ohio State (5–1–1)	SMU (5–1–3)	Mississippi State (9–0–2)	Washington State (8–1–2)	Pittsburgh (11–3–0)	Portland (9–1–4)т	Tennessee (10–4–2)	Penn State (11–4–3)	Memphis (11–5–6)	21.
22.	Memphis	Tennessee (0–1–1)	Wisconsin (2–0–2)	Ohio State (3–1–1)	Washington (5–0–2)	NC State (6–1–3)	South Carolina (6–2–3)	Pepperdine (7–1–2)	Texas (10–1–3)т	South Carolina (9–3–3)т	UCF (8–2–4)	Tennessee (11–4–2)	Santa Clara (11–7–3)	22.
23.	SMU	UCF (1–0–1)	Memphis (3–1–0)	Texas (3–1–1)	Auburn (4–0–4)	Georgetown (4–1–3)	Wisconsin (8–1–2)	Texas (8–1–3)	Xavier (11–2–2)т	Texas (11–1–3)	Santa Clara (9–6–1)	Santa Clara (9–6–2)	USC (12–3–3)т	23.
24.	Xavier	Wisconsin (1–0–1)	Michigan (3–1–0)	Washington (5–0–1)т	Clemson (4–1–2)	Portland (5–0–4)	SMU (6–1–3)	Virginia Tech (9–2–1)	South Carolina (9–2–3)	Penn State (10–3–2)	Xavier (12–2–4)	Rutgers (13–4–2)	UCF (9–2–7)т	24.
25.	Clemson	Colorado (2–0–0)	Samford (3–0–1)	Georgetown (2–1–3)т Wake Forest (5–0–1)т	BYU (3–2–2)	Texas (6–1–2)	Harvard (6–0–2)	Harvard (7–0–2)	Penn State (8–3–2)	California (8–4–3)	Ohio State (10–4–3)т California (9–4–4)т	Clemson (8–4–5)	Harvard (12–2–3)	25.
	Preseason Aug 2	Week 1 Aug 23	Week 2 Aug 30	Week 3 Sep 6	Week 4 Sep 13	Week 5 Sep 20	Week 6 Sep 27	Week 7 Oct 4	Week 8 Oct 11	Week 9 Oct 18	Week 10 Oct 25	Week 11 Nov 1	Final Dec 7	
		Dropped: No. 5 Santa Clara; No. 8 Arkansas; No. 9 Michigan; No. 15 USC; No. 16 Notre Dame; No. 20 Washington State; No. 22 Memphis; No. 24 Xavier	Dropped: No. 17 Butler; No. 18 Clemson; No. 19 Saint Louis; No. 20 Ohio State; No. 22 Tennessee; No. 24 UCF	Dropped: No. 6т TCU; No. 19 Xavier; No. 22 Wisconsin; No. 23 Memphis; No. 24 Michigan; No. 25 Samford	Dropped: No. 17 West Virginia; No. 19 Colorado; No. 21 Texas A&M; No. 24т Georgetown; No. 24т Wake Forest	Dropped: No. 21 Ohio State; No. 23 Auburn; No. 25 BYU	Dropped: No. 14 Clemson; No. 15 Washington; No. 19 Stanford; No. 22 NC State; No. 25 Texas	Dropped: No. 6 Penn State; No. 21 Mississippi State; No. 22 South Carolina; No. 23 Wisconsin; No. 24 SMU	Dropped: No. 20 Ole Miss; No. 21 Washington State; No. 22 Pepperdine; No. 24 Virginia Tech; No. 25 Harvard	Dropped: No. 22т Xavier	Dropped: No. 21т Portland; No. 24 Penn State	Dropped: No. 24 Xavier; No. 25т California; No. 25т Ohio State	Dropped: No. 22 Tennessee; No. 24 Rutgers; No. 25 Clemson	

== Top Drawer Soccer ==
	Week 1 Aug 15	Week 2 Aug 22	Week 3 Aug 29	Week 4 Sep 5	Week 5 Sep 12	Week 6 Sep 19	Week 7 Sep 26	Week 8 Oct 3	Week 9 Oct 10	Week 10 Oct 17	Week 11 Oct 24	Week 12 Oct 31	Week 13 Nov 7	Week 14 Nov 14	Week 15 Nov 21	Week 16 Nov 28	Final Dec 5	
1.	Florida State	Virginia (2–0–0)	Virginia (4–0–0)	UCLA (5–0–0)	UCLA (6–0–0)	UCLA (8–0–0)	UCLA (9–0–0)	UCLA (11–0–0)	UCLA (13–0–0)	Alabama (14–1–1)	Alabama (16–1–1)	Alabama (17–1–1)	Florida State (13–2–3)	Florida State (14–2–3)	Florida State (16–2–3)	Florida State (17–2–3)	UCLA (20–2–1)	1.
2.	Virginia	Florida State (1–0–1)	Duke (4–0–0)	Virginia (6–0–0)	Virginia (7–0–1)	Virginia (8–0–1)	Florida State (7–0–2)	Florida State (8–0–2)	Alabama (13–1–1)	UCLA (13–1–0)	UCLA (15–1–0)	UCLA (16–1–0)	Alabama (18–2–1)	Alabama (19–2–1)	Alabama (21–2–1)	Alabama (22–2–1)	North Carolina (20–4–1)	2.
3.	Tennessee	Duke (2–0–0)	North Carolina (4–0–0)	North Carolina (5–1–0)	North Carolina (7–1–0)	Rutgers (9–0–0)	Virginia (9–1–1)	Virginia (10–1–1)	Florida State (9–1–2)	Florida State (10–1–2)	North Carolina (14–3–0)	North Carolina (15–3–0)	UCLA (17–2–0)	UCLA (18–2–0)	UCLA (19–2–1)	UCLA (20–2–1)	Alabama (22–2–1)	3.
4.	BYU	North Carolina (2–0–0)	UCLA (3–0–0)	Duke (5–1–0)	Rutgers (8–0–0)	North Carolina (7–2–0)	North Carolina (9–2–0)	Alabama (11–1–1)	Virginia (10–2–2)	Virginia (10–2–3)	Florida State (11–2–2)	Florida State (12–2–2)	North Carolina (15–4–1)	North Carolina (16–4–1)	North Carolina (18–4–1)	North Carolina (19–4–1)	Florida State (17–3–3)	4.
5.	Duke	BYU (1–0–0)	BYU (2–0–0)	Rutgers (6–0–0)	Duke (5–2–0)	Duke (6–2–0)	Duke (8–2–0)	North Carolina (9–3–0)	North Carolina (11–3–0)	North Carolina (12–3–0)	Virginia (12–2–3)	Notre Dame (14–2–1)	Notre Dame (14–2–3)	Notre Dame (15–2–3)	Notre Dame (17–2–3)	Notre Dame (17–3–3)	Notre Dame (17–3–3)	5.
6.	UCLA	UCLA (1–0–0)	South Carolina (3–0–1)	South Carolina (4–0–2)	South Carolina (5–0–3)	Florida State (5–0–2)	Alabama (10–1–1)	Duke (8–3–0)	Duke (10–3–0)	Rutgers (13–1–2)	Notre Dame (14–2–0)	Michigan State (14–1–3)	Stanford (16–2–2)	Stanford (17–2–2)	Duke (15–4–3)	Virginia (16–4–3)	Virginia (16–4–3)	6.
7.	Penn State	Penn State (1–0–1)	Penn State (3–0–1)	BYU (3–1–1)	Florida State (4–0–2)	Alabama (8–1–1)	Penn State (7–1–2)	Rutgers (11–1–1)	Rutgers (12–1–1)	Stanford (12–2–1)	Michigan State (14–1–3)	Virginia (13–2–3)	Michigan State (16–2–3)	Penn State (14–4–3)	Virginia (16–3–3)	Arkansas (13–4–5)	Arkansas (13–4–5)	7.
8.	North Carolina	Rutgers (2–0–0)	Rutgers (4–0–0)	Florida State (2–0–2)	Notre Dame (7–0–0)	Saint Louis (9–1–0)	Rutgers (10–1–0)	Northwestern (10–1–2)	Northwestern (11–1–2)	Notre Dame (12–2–0)	Stanford (14–2–1)	Stanford (16–2–1)	Saint Louis (20–1–0)	Michigan State (17–2–3)	Arkansas (13–3–5)	Duke (15–5–3)	Duke (15–5–3)	8.
9.	Arkansas	Tennessee (0–1–1)	Florida State (1–0–2)	Notre Dame (5–0–0)	Arkansas (4–1–1)	Ole Miss (7–0–2)	Saint Louis (11–1–0)	Saint Louis (12–1–0)	Saint Louis (13–1–0)	Saint Louis (15–1–0)	Duke (11–4–1)	Duke (11–4–2)	Duke (12–4–3)	Duke (13–4–3)	Stanford (17–2–3)	Stanford (17–2–3)	Stanford (17–2–3)	9.
10.	Rutgers	Georgetown (1–0–1)	Notre Dame (3–0–0)	Arkansas (4–1–0)	Penn State (5–1–1)	Georgetown (4–1–3)	Ole Miss (9–0–2)	Pittsburgh (11–1–0)	Arkansas (9–2–1)	Duke (10–4–0)	Saint Louis (17–1–0)	Saint Louis (18–1–0)	Georgetown (14–1–5)	Georgetown (15–1–5)	Penn State (15–5–3)	Penn State (15–5–3)	Penn State (15–5–3)	10.
11.	Santa Clara	South Carolina (1–0–1)	Arkansas (1–1–0)	Stanford (5–0–0)	Georgetown (3–1–3)	Stanford (7–1–1)	Northwestern (9–1–1)	Georgetown (8–1–3)	South Carolina (9–2–3)	Georgetown (11–1–4)	Rutgers (13–3–2)	Northwestern (14–3–2)	Penn State (13–4–3)	Virginia (14–3–3)	Michigan State (17–3–3)	Michigan State (17–3–3)	Michigan State (17–3–3)	11.
12.	TCU	Arkansas (0–1–0)	TCU (2–0–1)	Penn State (4–1–1)	Stanford (6–1–0)	South Carolina (5–1–3)	Georgetown (6–1–3)	South Carolina (7–2–3)	Georgetown (9–1–4)	Northwestern (12–2–2)	Georgetown (12–1–5)	Georgetown (12–1–5)	Virginia (13–3–3)	Arkansas (12–3–4)	BYU (11–3–7)	BYU (11–3–7)	BYU (11–3–7)	12.
13.	Georgetown	TCU (1–0–1)	Georgetown (1–1–2)	Georgetown (2–1–3)	Saint Louis (7–1–0)	Penn State (5–1–2)	South Carolina (6–2–3)	Arkansas (7–2–1)	Notre Dame (11–2–0)	Arkansas (10–3–1)	Arkansas (10–3–3)	Arkansas (11–3–3)	USC (12–2–3)	Northwestern (15–4–2)	Georgetown (15–2–5)	Georgetown (15–2–5)	Georgetown (15–2–5)	13.
14.	South Carolina	Clemson (1–0–1)	Stanford (2–0–0)	Ole Miss (5–0–1)	BYU (3–2–2)	BYU (4–2–3)	Pittsburgh (10–1–0)	Mississippi State (9–0–3)	Stanford (11–2–1)	TCU (9–2–4)	Texas (11–2–4)	Rutgers (13–4–2)	Arkansas (11–3–4)	BYU (11–2–6)	Northwestern (16–5–2)	Northwestern (16–5–2)	Northwestern (16–5–2)	14.
15.	Clemson	Notre Dame (2–0–0)	Pepperdine (3–0–1)	Pepperdine (4–0–2)	Ole Miss (6–0–2)	Clemson (5–1–2)	Mississippi State (9–0–2)	Notre Dame (9–2–0)	Pittsburgh (11–3–0)	Ohio State (10–2–3)	BYU (8–2–5)	Texas (14–1–4)	Northwestern (14–4–2)	Texas (15–2–4)	Texas (15–3–4)	Texas (15–3–4)	Texas (15–3–4)	15.
16.	Notre Dame	Santa Clara (1–1–0)	Clemson (2–1–1)	TCU (3–2–1)	Pepperdine (5–0–2)	Notre Dame (7–1–0)	Arkansas (6–2–1)	Ole Miss (9–1–2)	TCU (8–2–4)	Michigan State (12–1–3)	Northwestern (13–3–2)	TCU (10–3–5)	BYU (10–2–6)	TCU (13–4–5)	TCU (14–5–5)	TCU (14–5–5)	TCU (14–5–5)	16.
17.	Michigan	Pepperdine (2–0–0)	NC State (3–0–1)	Tennessee (2–2–1)	TCU (5–2–1)	Northwestern (7–1–1)	TCU (6–2–3)	Ohio State (8–2–2)	Ohio State (8–2–3)	Penn State (10–3–2)	TCU (10–3–4)	BYU (8–2–6)	Rutgers (13–4–2)	South Carolina (14–3–5)	South Carolina (15–4–5)	South Carolina (15–4–5)	South Carolina (15–4–5)	17.
18.	USC	Stanford (1–0–0)	Michigan (3–1–0)	Clemson (3–1–2)	Tennessee (4–2–1)	Tennessee (5–2–1)	Notre Dame (8–2–0)	Penn State (7–3–2)	Portland (8–0–4)	Texas (11–1–3)	Ohio State (10–3–4)	USC (10–2–3)	Texas (14–2–4)	Xavier (14–3–5)	Xavier (14–4–5)	Xavier (14–4–5)	Xavier (14–4–5)	18.
19.	Washington State	Michigan (1–1–0)	Ole Miss (3–0–1)	NC State (4–1–1)	Clemson (4–1–2)	NC State (6–1–3)	Stanford (7–2–1)	TCU (7–2–3)	Penn State (8–3–2)	Pittsburgh (11–3–1)	Pittsburgh (12–4–1)	Penn State (10–4–3)	TCU (12–4–5)	Brown (12–2–2)	Brown (12–2–3)	Brown (12–2–3)	Brown (12–2–3)	19.
20.	Stanford	USC (1–1–0)	Xavier (2–0–1)	Brown (4–0–0)	NC State (4–1–3)	TCU (5–2–2)	BYU (4–2–3)	Washington State (8–1–2)	Tennessee (9–3–1)	Tennessee (9–3–2)	Penn State (10–4–3)	Pittsburgh (12–4–2)	South Carolina (13–3–5)	Santa Clara (11–6–3)	Pittsburgh (14–5–3)	Pittsburgh (14–5–3)	Pittsburgh (14–5–3)	20.
21.	Xavier	NC State (2–0–0)	Tennessee (0–2–1)	Xavier (4–1–1)	Ohio State (5–1–1)	Mississippi State (6–1–2)	Texas (7–1–3)	Stanford (9–2–1)	Texas (10–1–3)	USC (9–2–1)	USC (9–2–3)	Xavier (12–2–5)	Xavier (13–3–5)	UCF (9–2–6)	Santa Clara (11–7–3)	Santa Clara (11–7–3)	Santa Clara (11–7–3)	21.
22.	Pepperdine	Xavier (1–0–1)	Wisconsin (2–0–2)	Harvard (4–0–0)	Harvard (6–0–0)	Arkansas (4–2–1)	Harvard (6–0–2)	Texas (8–1–3)	Michigan State (10–1–3)	BYU (5–2–5)	Xavier (12–2–4)	UCF (9–2–4)	Santa Clara (10–6–3)	Pittsburgh (13–4–3)	UCF (9–2–7)	UCF (9–2–7)	UCF (9–2–7)	22.
23.	NC State	Saint Louis (2–0–0)	Brown (1–0–0)	Colorado (5–0–1)	Texas (5–1–1)	Texas (6–1–2)	Washington (6–1–2)	Harvard (7–0–2)	Xavier (11–2–2)	Portland (8–1–4)	Tennessee (10–4–2)	Santa Clara (9–6–2)	Brown (11–2–2)	Vanderbilt (12–3–4)	Vanderbilt (12–4–4)	Vanderbilt (12–4–4)	Vanderbilt (12–4–4)	23.
24.	Brown	Brown (0–0–0)	SMU (1–0–1)	SMU (3–0–2)	SMU (4–0–3)	Harvard (6–0–1)	Clemson (5–3–2)	Washington (8–1–2)	Ole Miss (9–3–2)	Xavier (11–2–3)	UCF (8–2–4)	Tennessee (11–4–2)	UCF (9–2–5)	Saint Louis (20–2–0)	Saint Louis (20–2–0)	Saint Louis (20–2–0)	Saint Louis (20–2–0)	24.
25.	Memphis	Memphis (1–1–0)	Memphis (1–1–0)	Texas A&M (4–0–2)	Brown (4–1–1)	Pepperdine (6–1–2)	Pepperdine (6–1–2)	Pepperdine (7–1–2)	Mississippi State (10–1–3)	Mississippi State (10–2–3)	South Carolina (10–3–4)	South Carolina (11–3–4)	Pittsburgh (12–4–3)	Rutgers (13–5–2)	Rutgers (13–5–2)	Rutgers (13–5–2)	Rutgers (13–5–2)	25.
	Week 1 Aug 15	Week 2 Aug 22	Week 3 Aug 29	Week 4 Sep 5	Week 5 Sep 12	Week 6 Sep 19	Week 7 Sep 26	Week 8 Oct 3	Week 9 Oct 10	Week 10 Oct 17	Week 11 Oct 24	Week 12 Oct 31	Week 13 Nov 7	Week 14 Nov 14	Week 15 Nov 21	Week 16 Nov 28	Final Dec 5	
		Dropped: No. 19 Washington State	Dropped: No. 16 Santa Clara; No. 20 USC; No. 23 Saint Louis	Dropped: No. 18 Michigan; No. 22 Wisconsin; No. 25 Memphis	Dropped: No. 21 Xavier; No. 23 Colorado; No. 25 Texas A&M	Dropped: No. 21 Ohio State; No. 24 SMU; No. 25 Brown	Dropped: No. 18 Tennessee; No. 19 NC State	Dropped: No. 20 BYU; No. 24 Clemson	Dropped: No. 20 Washington State; No. 23 Harvard; No. 24 Washington; No. 25 Pepperdine	Dropped: No. 11 South Carolina; No. 24 Ole Miss	Dropped: No. 23 Portland; No. 25 Mississippi State	Dropped: No. 18 Ohio State	Dropped: No. 24 Tennessee	Dropped: No. 13 USC	Dropped: None	Dropped: None	Dropped: None	
