= 2022 NCAA Division I women's soccer championship game =

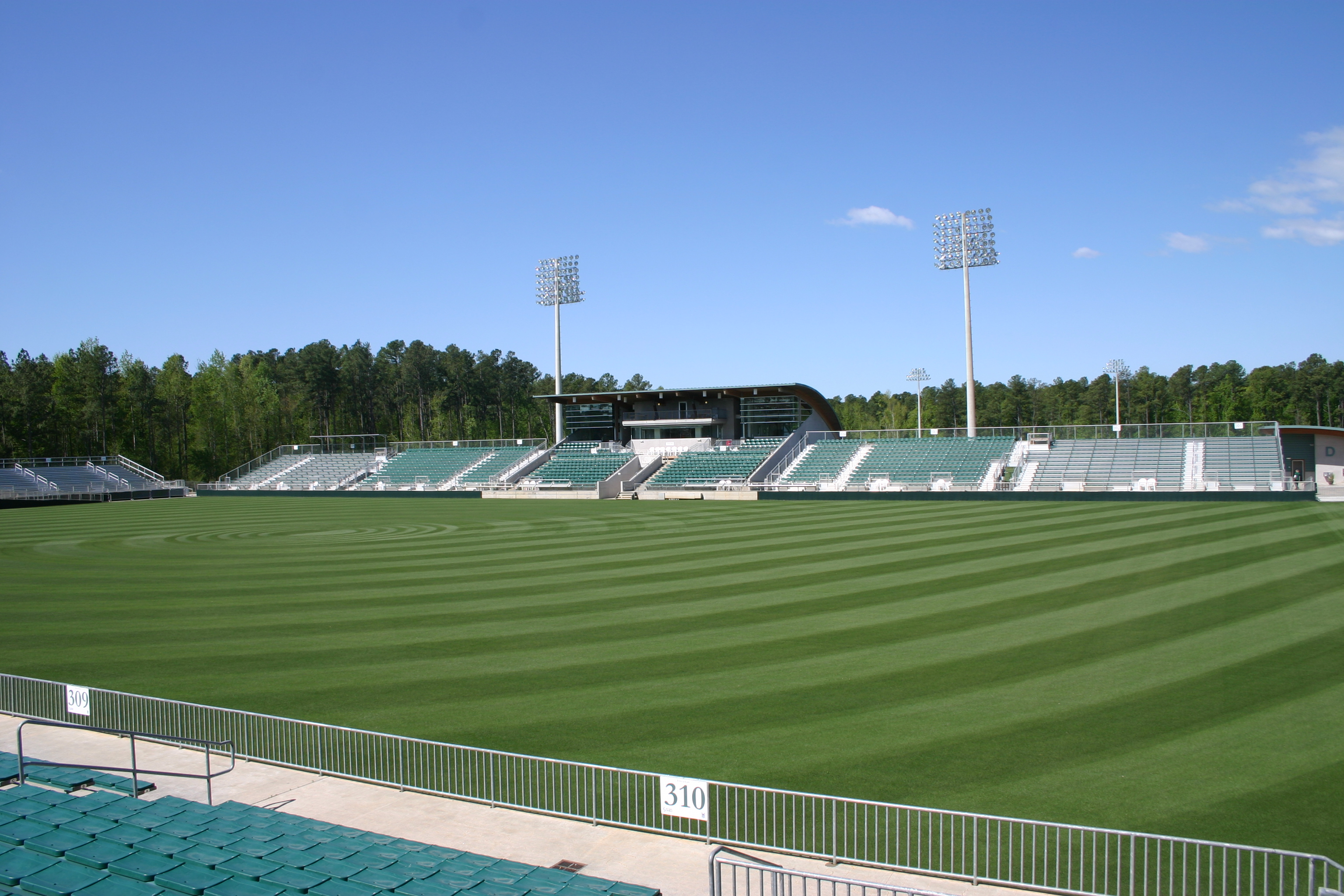
- WakeMed Soccer Park hosted the match
- Event: 2022 NCAA Division I women's soccer tournament
North Carolina	UCLA
ACC	Pac-12
2	3
- (after extra time)
- Date: 5 December 2022
- Venue: WakeMed Soccer Park, Cary, NC
- Referee: Samantha Martinez
- Attendance: 9,531

The 2022 NCAA Division I women's soccer championship game (also known as the 2022 NCAA Division I Women's College Cup) was played on December 4, 2022, at WakeMed Soccer Park in Cary, North Carolina, and determined the winner of the 2022 NCAA Division I women's soccer tournament, the national collegiate women's soccer championship in the United States. This was the 41st. edition of this tournament organised by the NCAA.

The match featured North Carolina (20–4–1), which played its 27th. final, and UCLA, which made its 6th. appearance in the final. UCLA made a historic comeback to defeat North Carolina 3–2 and win their second NCAA women's soccer title.

UCLA forced extra time after scoring in the final 20 seconds, and would win after a goal scored by Graduate midfielder Maricarmen Reyes in the 107th Minute. UCLA (which had reached the final with a 22–2–1 record) also became the first women's soccer program in the NCAA history to win a national championship with a first-year head coach. This championship became the 120th. title in UCLA athletics program history.

North Carolina coach Anson Dorrance praised UCLA, and stated about the game: "This is one of the greatest finals I've personally ever been involved in" (...) up and back, lots of goals, overtime, the drama of sport — one team goes up, the other one claws their way back."

== Road to the final ==
The NCAA Division I women's soccer tournament, sometimes known as the College Cup, is an American intercollegiate soccer tournament conducted by the National Collegiate Athletic Association (NCAA), and determines the Division I women's national champion. The tournament has been formally held since 1982, when it was a twelve-team tournament.

North Carolina (ACC)		Round	UCLA (Pac-12)	
Opponent	Result	NCAA Tournament	Opponent	Result
Old Dominion (ACC)	5–0 (H)	First round	Northern Arizona (BSC)	4–1 (A)
Georgia (SEC)	3–1 (H)	Second round	UCF (Big 12)	1–1 (3–0 p) (A)
BYU (Big 12)	3–2 (H)	Round of 16	Northwestern (Big Ten)	2–0 (A)
Notre Dame (ACC)	2–0 (H)	Quarterfinal	Virginia (ACC)	2–1 (A)
Florida State (ACC)	3–2 (N)	College Cup	Alabama (SEC)	3–0 (N)

== Match details ==
2022 College Cup Final
5 December 2022

North Carolina	2–3 (a.e.t.)	UCLA
Patterson 59', 75'	Report	Wright 80'; Turner 89'; Reyes 107'

WakeMed Soccer Park, Cary, NC
Attendance: 9,531
Referee: Samantha Martinez

North Carolina
UCLA

GK	32	(United States) Emmie Allen
DF	7	(United States) Julia Dorsey
DF	22	(United States) Tori Hansen
MF	6	(United States) Emerson Elgin
MF	19	(United States) Emily Colton		(substituted off) 28' (substituted on) 45' (substituted off) 56' (substituted on) 67' (substituted off) 79'
MF	20	(United States) Libby Moore
MF	24	(United States) Talia DellaPeruta	(yellow card) 73'	(substituted off) 28' (substituted on) 45' (substituted off) 56' (substituted on) 67' (substituted off) 79'
FW	8	(United States) Emily Moxley
FW	13	(United States) Isabel Cox	(yellow card) 69'	(substituted off) 26' (substituted on) 45' (substituted off) 56' (substituted on) 67' (substituted off) 77'
FW	15	(United States) Avery Patterson
FW	21	(United States) Ally Sentnor		(substituted off) 38' (substituted on) 45' (substituted off) 70' (substituted on) 77'
Substitutions:
FW	5	(United States) Maddie Dahlien		(substituted on) 26' (substituted off) 45' (substituted on) 56' (substituted off) 67' (substituted on) 78' (substituted off) 84'
MF	28	(United States) Maggie Pierce	(yellow card) 89'	(substituted on) 28' (substituted on) 46' (substituted on) 56' (substituted off) 67' (substituted on) 79'
MF	16	(United States) Aleigh Gambone		(substituted on) 28' (substituted off) 45' (substituted on) 56' (substituted off) 67' (substituted on) 79'
FW	9	(Italy) Tori DellaPeruta		(substituted on) 38' (substituted off) 45' (substituted on) 70' (substituted off) 74'
FW	10	(United States) Rachel Jones		(substituted on) 74' (substituted off) 78'
FW	35	(Republic of Ireland) Emily Murphy		(substituted on) 84'
Head Coach:
(United States) Anson Dorrance

GK	1	(Hungary) Lauren Brzykcy
DF	4	(United States) Lilly Reale
DF	15	(United States) Jayden Perry	(yellow card) 33'
DF	19	(United States) Quincy McMahon
MF	10	(United States) Ally Lemos
MF	11	(United States) Madelyn Desiano
MF	27	(Nicaragua) Jackie Gilday		(substituted off) 74'
FW	17	(United States) Lexi Wright		(substituted off) 38' (substituted on) 45' (substituted off) 70' (substituted on) 74'
FW	26	(United States) Bridgette Marin	(yellow card) 77'	(substituted off) 38' (substituted on) 70' (substituted off) 84'
FW	50	(United States) Sunshine Fontes		(substituted off) 67' (substituted on) 74'
FW	66	(United States) Reilyn Turner		(substituted off) 26' (substituted on) 45'
Substitutions:
FW	33	(United States) Ally Cook		(substituted on) 26'
MF	9	(United States) Sofia Cook		(substituted on) 38' (substituted off) 45' (substituted on) 67' (substituted off) 74'
MF	24	(Mexico) Maricarmen Reyes		(substituted on) 38' (substituted off) 45' (substituted on) 84'
DF	34	(United States) Brianne Riley
Head Coach:
(United States) Margueritte Aozasa

College Cup MVP
Offensive: Reilyn Turner
Defensive: Lilly Reale

Assistant referees:
Kate Wasiak (United States)
Tiffini Turpin (United States)
Fourth official:
Mark Kadlecik (United States)

Match rules:

- 90 minutes.
- 20 minutes of extra time if necessary.
- Penalty shoot-out if scores still level.
- Unlimited substitutes, may not return if subbed out in the first half; may return unlimited times in the second half.

=== Statistics ===
Overall
	North Carolina	UCLA
Goals scored	2	3
Total shots	13	20
Saves	9	5
Corner kicks	4	9
Fouls	9	22
Yellow cards	3	2
Red cards	0	0
