= Sofia Cook =

American soccer player (born 2004)

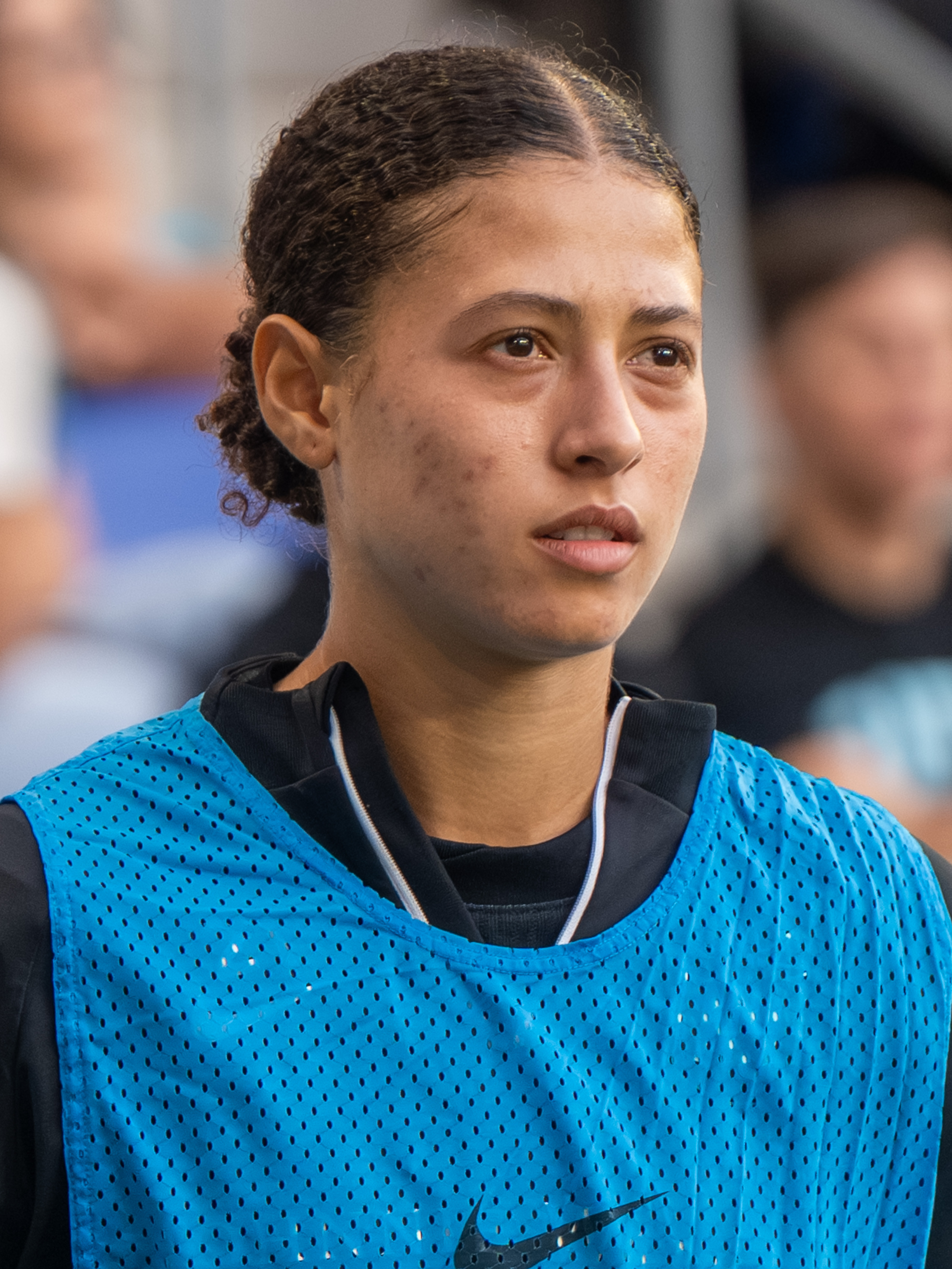
- Cook with Gotham FC in 2025

Personal information
- Full name: Sofia Gabriela Cook
- Date of birth: August 7, 2004 (age 22)
- Place of birth: Los Angeles, California, U.S.
- Height: 5 ft 6 in (1.68 m)
- Position: Midfielder

Team information
- Current team: Gotham FC
- Number: 21

College career
Years	Team	Apps	(Gls)
2022–2024	UCLA Bruins	56	(12)

Senior career*
Years	Team	Apps	(Gls)
2025–	Gotham FC	24	(0)

International career^{‡}
2020	United States U-16	3	(1)
2023–2024	United States U-20	6	(0)
2026–	United States U-23	1	(0)
- * Club domestic league appearances and goals as of November 1, 2026 ‡ National team caps and goals as of 14:18, March 8, 2026 (UTC)

Sofia Gabriela Cook (born August 7, 2004) is an American professional soccer player who plays as a midfielder for Gotham FC of the National Women's Soccer League (NWSL). She played college soccer for the UCLA Bruins, winning the 2022 national championship.

== Early life ==
Cook was born in Los Angeles, to Gabriela and Jerome Cook, and has a younger brother. She is of Argentine descent on her mother's side. Cook grew up in Huntington Beach and attended Millikan and Marina High School, where she graduated early. She played club soccer for LA Galaxy's academy and So Cal Blues of the ECNL. She was rated by TopDrawerSoccer as the 19th-best recruit of the 2022 class.

== College career ==
Cook appeared in 24 games (7 starts) in her freshman season with the UCLA Bruins in 2022, scoring 7 goals with 4 assists. In the NCAA tournament, she scored the overtime winner in a 2–1 victory over Virginia in the quarterfinals. UCLA mounted a comeback to defeat North Carolina 3–2 in the championship game, winning their second national title. Cook was named to the Pac-12 Conference all-freshman team and the TopDrawerSoccer Freshman Best XI second team.

Cook played in 15 games (10 starts) as a sophomore in 2023, scoring 1 goal with 2 assists, and was named second-team All-Pac 12. Her only goal of the year came in a 1–1 draw against Stanford which clinched the Pac-12 title for the Bruins. In her junior season in 2024, she played in 17 games (13 starts) and scored a team-joint-high 4 goals, earning first-team All-Big Ten honors. UCLA won the Big Ten tournament in their first year in the conference.

== Club career ==
Gotham FC announced on January 29, 2025, that they had signed Cook to a two-year contract with an option to extend for another year. She made her professional debut on May 4, coming on as a second-half substitute for Sarah Schupansky in a 0–0 draw with the Chicago Stars. On February 23, 2026, it was announced that Cook had signed a contract extension through 2028, with Gotham's general manager Yael Averbuch West saying “Sofia is a talented player with a very bright future ahead".

== International career ==
Cook began training with the United States youth national team at the under-14 level in 2018. She won the 2018 CONCACAF Girls' U-15 Championship with the under-15 team. She was injured in the lead-up to the 2023 CONCACAF Women's U-20 Championship but recovered and was selected to the roster, making two tournament appearances as they finished runners-up to Mexico.

== Honors and awards ==
UCLA Bruins

- NCAA Division I women's soccer tournament: 2022

Gotham FC

- NWSL Championship: 2025
- NWSL Shield: 2026
- NWSL Challenge Cup: 2026
- CONCACAF W Champions Cup: 2024–25

United States U-15

- CONCACAF Girls' U-15 Championship: 2018

Individual

- First-team All-Big Ten: 2024
- Second-team All-Pac-12: 2023
- Pac-12 all-freshman team: 2022
