= Ava Seelenfreund =

American soccer player (born 2001)

Personal information
- Full name: Ava Marie Seelenfreund
- Date of birth: January 18, 2001 (age 25)
- Height: 5 ft 9 in (1.75 m)
- Position: Forward

Team information
- Current team: Real Sociedad

Youth career
- 2015–2018: Truckee Wolverines

College career
Years	Team	Apps	(Gls)
2019–2023	Brown Bears	69	(25)

Senior career*
Years	Team	Apps	(Gls)
2024–2026	Torreense	34	(17)
2026–	Real Sociedad	0	(0)
- * Club domestic league appearances and goals as of May 10, 2026

Ava Marie Seelenfreund (born January 18, 2001) is an American professional soccer player who plays as a forward for Liga F club Real Sociedad. After playing college soccer for the Brown Bears, she began her professional career with Portuguese club Torreense in 2024, helping them win the first three trophies in club history.

== Early life ==
Seelenfreund grew up in Truckee, California, the daughter of Annie and Eric Seelenfreund, and has two siblings. She played high school soccer at Truckee High School, scoring 127 goals over four seasons and earning all-state honors all four years. She led Truckee to win three consecutive NIAA Class 3A state championships, scoring in all three finals (2016–2018). She committed to play college soccer for the Brown Bears.

== College career ==
Seelenfreund scored 5 goals and provided 5 assists in 19 games for the Brown Bears as a freshman in 2019. She earned second-team All-Ivy honors and helped the team win their first Ivy League championship since 1994, going on repeat the league title in all four seasons she played in Providence. The next year of Ivy League sports was cancelled due to the COVID-19 pandemic, but she returned to score 8 goals in 16 games as a sophomore in 2021, receiving a first-team All-Ivy selection.

In her junior year in 2022, Seelenfreund led the Bears with 10 goals in 17 games (tied with teammate Brittany Raphino) and was named first-team All-Ivy for the second time. She scored her first NCAA tournament goal against Rutgers as Brown reached the second round. In her senior year in 2023, she had 2 goals and 4 assists in 17 games and earned her fourth consecutive All-Ivy honors, being named to the second team. She again scored in the NCAA tournament to reach the second round.

== Club career ==
=== Torreense ===
Seelenfreund was eligible for selection in the 2024 NWSL Draft, but instead signed her first professional contract with Portuguese club Torreense on January 18, 2024. She scored her first professional goal on February 10, converting the club's third penalty of the match in a 1–0 win against Vilaverdense. On March 17, she scored her first goals from open play with a double in a 4–0 win over Valadares Gaia. The following week, she again scored twice as Torreense won 3–2 against Ouriense. She finished the 2023–24 season with 6 goals from 12 appearances.

On August 30, 2024, Seelenfreund began the 2024–25 season with a goal in a 2–1 defeat to defending champions Benfica. On May 17, 2025, she helped Torreense win their first trophy in club history, the Taça de Portugal Feminina, prevailing 2–1 over Benfica in extra time in the final. She finished the season with 7 goals from 20 games in all competitions.

On September 7, 2025, Seelenfreund started the 2025–26 season with a second trophy, winning the Supertaça de Portugal Feminina after a 2–1 victory over Benfica. Two weeks later, she scored her first goal of the season in a 4–2 win over Marítimo. On December 13, she scored her first professional hat trick as Torreense routed third-tier club Leiria in the Taça de Portugal round of sixteen. On January 18, 2026, she scored in her fifth consecutive game with a penalty in a 3–2 loss to Benfica in the Taça de Portugal quarterfinals. On March 28, she won her third trophy in under a year, capturing the Taça da Liga Feminina after a 1–0 win over Valadares Gaia in the final. She finished the season with 12 goals from 25 games in all competitions, leading Torreense in scoring as they placed an impressive third in the league.

=== Real Sociedad ===
On July 13, 2026, Seelenfreund signed a three-year contract with Spanish club Real Sociedad.

== Honors and awards ==
Brown Bears

- Ivy League: 2019, 2021, 2022, 2023

Torreense

- Taça de Portugal Feminina: 2024–25
- Taça da Liga Feminina: 2025–26
- Supertaça de Portugal Feminina: 2025

Individual

- First-team All-Ivy: 2021, 2022
- Second-team All-Ivy: 2019, 2023
