= United States women's national under-23 soccer team =

Women's national under-23 soccer team representing the United States

United States Under-23
- Nickname(s): Team USA; The Stars and Stripes; The Yanks
- Association: United States Soccer Federation
- Confederation: CONCACAF (North America)
- Head coach: Heather Dyche
- FIFA code: USA
First colors	Second colors

Nordic Cup
- Appearances: 12 (first in 1997)
- Best result: Winners (1997, 1999, 2000, 2001, 2002, 2003, 2004, 2005, 2007, 2008)

The U-23 Women's Youth National Team, operated by the United States Soccer Federation, develops young players for the U.S. women's national soccer team (USWNT). It seeks to bridge the gap between college soccer and the USWNT, and functions as a development partner with the National Women's Soccer League.

In response to FIFA's decision to shift its oldest youth world championship from Under-19s to Under-20s and a change in the Nordic Cup competition that became a U-23 event, the team transitioned from Under-21 to Under-23 in 2008. Following the conclusion of the Nordic Cup in 2009, the U.S. U-23s have engaged in various international competitions, primarily in Spain and Scandinavia. In recent years, they have participated in an NWSL preseason tournament in Portland, where they compete in three games against NWSL clubs.

== History ==
=== Beginnings as a U-20 program ===
The United States U-23 team has been active since 1989, however it was run as a U-20 team from its inception until 1998. Its main goal was to prepare college players for the step up to international soccer. Women had no viable opportunities to enhance their playing abilities, aside from overseas, since the United States lacked a top-level domestic league during this time.

=== The switch to U-21 ===
In 1998, United States Soccer Federation decided to make the team a U-21 team in order to give women a higher level of play to better prepare them for the full National Team. In accordance with this strategy, the U-21 team frequently rostered "over-aged" players in the U-21 training camps, as well as the Nordic Cup. It remained a U-21 team from 1998 through 2008.

=== Competing as a U-23 team ===
2008 saw the change of the U.S.'s oldest youth national team moved to the U-23 level. The move was made by the United States Soccer Federation in response to age-level changes FIFA had made to its oldest women's youth competition, now named FIFA U-20 Women's World Cup. The age limit was raised from being a U-19 tournament to a U-20 tournament. This change, coupled with a newly introduced U-23 age limit to the Nordic Cup, prompted the USSF to rethink and eventually change the youth development team. The team continues to serve as a stepping-stone for collegiate and post-collegiate players to the United States Women's National Team. Additionally, many U-23 players develop further through the National Women's Soccer League. While many of the post-collegiate players play in this league to develop their game, the U-23's turned focus on college players who are out of season and may not yet be NWSL-eligible.

== Results and schedule ==
The following is a list of match results in the last 12 months, as well as any future matches that have been scheduled.

=== 2025 ===
Legend

Win Draw Lose Fixture

November 28, 2025 Friendly	Slovakia	0-1	United States	Senec, Slovakia
		Report	Sentnor 5'	Stadium: National Training Center

December 1, 2025 Friendly	England	2-4	United States	Accrington, England
	Simpson 53'; Barry 61'	Report	Adames 2'; Dahlien 43'; Weber 57'; Sentnor 73'	Stadium: Wham Stadium

=== 2026 ===
Legend

Win Draw Lose Fixture

March 3, 2026 Friendly	United States	1–0	Mexico	Miami, Florida
	Weber 14'	Report		Stadium: FIU Soccer Stadium; Referee: Jorge Escobar (USA)

March 6, 2026 Friendly	United States	v	Mexico	Miami, Florida
				Stadium: FIU Soccer Stadium

April 10, 2026 Friendly	Netherlands	1–1	United States	Murcia, Spain
	Elberink 83'	Report	Leyba 87'	Stadium: Estadio Nueva Condomina; Attendance: 50; Referee: Maria Planes Terol (SPA)

April 13, 2026 Friendly	Denmark	v	United States	San Pedro del Pinatar, Spain
				Stadium: Pinatar Arena

June 5 Friendly	(Brazil) SC Corinthians Paulista	v	United States	São Paulo, Brazil
				Stadium: DR Joaquim Grava Stadium

June 9 Friendly	(Brazil) SC Corinthians Paulista	v	United States	São Paulo, Brazil
				Stadium: Estadio Marcelo Portugal Gouveia

October 9 Friendly	Dominican Republic	0–5	United States	Fayetteville, Georgia
		Report	Fishel, Sentnor; Corley; Lema	Stadium: U.S. Soccer National Training Center

October 13 Friendly	Dominican Republic	v	United States	Fayetteville, Georgia
				Stadium: U.S. Soccer National Training Center

== Players ==
=== Current squad ===
24 players were named to the squad in October 2026 friendlies.

Caps and goals are current as of April 10, 2026, after match against Netherlands.

No.	Pos.	Player	Date of birth (age)	Caps	Goals	Club
	GK	Angelina Anderson	March 22, 2001 (age 25)	0	0	(United States Soccer Federation) Angel City
	GK	Teagan Wy	July 30, 2004 (age 22)	0	0	(United States Soccer Federation) Gotham
2	DF	Ayo Oke	April 5, 2003 (age 23)	4	0	(United States Soccer Federation) Denver Summit
5	DF	Leah Klenke	June 21, 2004 (age 22)	2	0	(United States Soccer Federation) Houston Dash
	DF	Jordyn Bugg	August 11, 2006 (age 20)	2	0	(United States Soccer Federation) Seattle Reign FC
	DF	Carolyn Calzada	March 6, 2003 (age 23)	1	0	(United States Soccer Federation) Portland Thorns
	DF	Kate Del Fava	June 23, 1998 (age 28)	0	0	(United States Soccer Federation) Utah Royals
	DF	Heather Gilchrist	March 4, 2004 (age 22)	0	0	(United States Soccer Federation) Bay
	DF	Savy King	February 7, 2005 (age 21)	0	0	(United States Soccer Federation) Angel City
	DF	Jayden Perry	March 31, 2003 (age 23)	4	0	(United States Soccer Federation) Portland Thorns FC
8	MF	Ally Lemos	March 4, 2004 (age 22)	4	0	(United States Soccer Federation) Orlando Pride
	MF	Kimmi Ascanio	January 21, 2008 (age 18)	1	0	(United States Soccer Federation) San Diego Wave FC
	MF	Gia Corley	May 20, 2002 (age 24)	0	0	(United States Soccer Federation) San Diego Wave FC
	MF	Riley Jackson	December 2, 2005 (age 20)	5	0	(United States Soccer Federation) North Carolina Courage
	MF	Ally Sentnor	February 18, 2004 (age 22)	2	2	(United States Soccer Federation) Angel City
	MF	Jaedyn Shaw	November 20, 2004 (age 21)	1	0	(United States Soccer Federation) Gotham FC
17	FW	Kat Rader	June 30, 2004 (age 22)	2	0	(United States Soccer Federation) Houston Dash
18	FW	Jordynn Dudley	November 21, 2004 (age 21)	0	0	(United States Soccer Federation) Gotham
	FW	Melanie Barcenas	October 30, 2007 (age 19)	0	0	(United States Soccer Federation) San Diego Wave FC
	FW	Maddie Dahlien	July 25, 2004 (age 22)	4	1	(United States Soccer Federation) Seattle Reign FC
	FW	Mia Fishel	April 30, 2001 (age 25)	2	0	(United States Soccer Federation) Seattle Reign
	FW	Caiya Hanks	September 26, 2004 (age 22)	0	0	(United States Soccer Federation) Portland Thorns
	FW	Jameese Joseph	May 3, 2002 (age 24)	2	0	(United States Soccer Federation) Utah Royals
	FW	Karlie Lema	June 29, 2003 (age 23)	2	0	(United States Soccer Federation) Bay FC

=== Recent call-ups ===
The following players were also named to a squad within the last 12 months.

- June 2026 friendlies.
- April 2026 friendlies.
- February/March 2026 training camp.
- January 2026 Development Camp.
- November/December 2025 friendlies.

This list may be incomplete.

Pos.	Player	Date of birth (age)	Caps	Goals	Club	Latest call-up
GK	Jordan Silkowitz	March 27, 2000 (age 26)	2	0	(United States) Bay FC	June 2026 friendlies
GK	Neeku Purcell	October 7, 2003 (age 23)	2	0	(United States) Seattle Reign	June 2026 friendlies
GK	Liz Beardsley	April 21, 2003 (age 23)	1	0	(United States) Tampa Bay Sun	February/March 2026 training camp
GK	Valentina Amaral	April 5, 2005 (age 21)	0	0	(United States) Wake Forest	January 2026 Development Camp
GK	Caroline Birkel	August 25, 2006 (age 20)	2	0	(United States) Stanford	January 2026 Development Camp
GK	Sonoma Kasica	June 26, 2006 (age 20)	1	0	(United States) Notre Dame	January 2026 Development Camp
DF	Evelyn Shores	December 29, 2004 (age 21)	6	1	(United States) Angel City FC	June 2026 friendlies
DF	Eva Gaetino	December 17, 2002 (age 23)	7	0	(United States) Denver Summit	June 2026 friendlies
DF	Andrea Kitahata	July 1, 2003 (age 23)	1	0	(United States) Gotham FC	April 2026 friendlies
DF	Sierra Sythe	February 18, 2005 (age 21)	0	0	(United States) Wake Forest	April 2026 friendlies
DF	Hailey Baumann	February 17, 2005 (age 21)	0	0	(United States) Wisconsin	April 2026 friendlies
DF	Faith Leyba	July 5, 2005 (age 21)	1	1	(United States) Colorado	April 2026 friendlies
DF	Macy Blackburn	April 23, 2003 (age 23)	1	0	(United States) Racing Louisville	February/March 2026 training camp
DF	Sydney Cheesman	March 17, 2004 (age 22)	0	0	(United States) LSU	February/March 2026 training camp
DF	Natalie Bain	December 29, 2003 (age 22)	0	0	(United States) Xavier	January 2026 Development Camp
DF	Ally Brown	October 9, 2003 (age 23)	0	0	(United States) Tennessee	January 2026 Development Camp
DF	Bella Devey	April 7, 2003 (age 23)	0	0	(United States) North Carolina	January 2026 Development Camp
DF	Gracie Falla	May 21, 2004 (age 22)	0	0	(United States) South Carolina	January 2026 Development Camp
DF	Daya King	October 1, 2007 (age 19)	0	0	(United States) Duke	January 2026 Development Camp
DF	Zoe Matthews	May 25, 2007 (age 19)	0	0	(Spain) Dux Logroño	January 2026 Development Camp
DF	Gisele Thompson	December 2, 2005 (age 20)	1	0	(United States) Angel City FC	November/December 2025 friendlies
MF	Yuna McCormack	November 3, 2004 (age 22)	2	0	(United States) Denver Summit	June 2026 friendlies
MF	Sofia Cook	August 7, 2004 (age 22)	1	0	(United States) Gotham	June 2026 friendlies
MF	Taylor Suarez	May 27, 2005 (age 21)	1	0	(United States) Angel City	June 2026 friendlies
FW	Pietra Tordin	March 30, 2004 (age 22)	4	0	(United States) Portland Thorns FC	June 2026 friendlies
MF	Taylor Huff	August 16, 2002 (age 24)	6	0	(United States) Bay FC	April 2026 friendlies
MF	Sarah Schupansky	August 25, 2003 (age 23)	6	0	(United States) Gotham FC	April 2026 friendlies
MF	Lexi Missimo	January 30, 2003 (age 23)	1	0	(United States) Dallas Trinity	February/March 2026 training camp
MF	Shae Harvey	March 1, 2005 (age 21)	1	0	(United States) Portland Thorns	February/March 2026 training camp
FW	Trinity Byars	January 29, 2003 (age 23)	0	0	(United States) San Diego Wave	June 2026 friendlies
FW	Madison Haley	October 25, 1998 (age 28)	0	0	(England) Brighton & Hove Albion	June 2026 friendlies
MF	Simone Jackson	January 28, 2003 (age 23)	3	0	(United States) Orlando Pride	April 2026 friendlies
FW	Riley Tiernan	November 14, 2002 (age 23)	5	0	(United States) Angel City FC	April 2026 friendlies
FW	Sarah Weber	May 14, 2003 (age 23)	4	2	(United States) Racing Louisville FC	April 2026 friendlies
FW	Seven Castain	April 26, 2004 (age 22)	0	0	(United States) TCU	April 2026 friendlies
FW	Hope Leyba	July 5, 2005 (age 21)	2	0	(United States) Colorado	April 2026 friendlies
FW	Reilyn Turner	October 18, 2002 (age 24)	3	1	(United States) Portland Thorns FC	April 2026 friendlies
FW	Olivia Thomas	April 16, 2005 (age 21)	0	0	(United States) Denver Summit	February/March 2026 training camp
FW	Jasmine Aikey	July 7, 2005 (age 21)	0	0	(United States) Denver Summit	February/March 2026 training camp
FW	Emeri Adames	April 3, 2006 (age 20)	2	1	(United States) Seattle Reign FC	November/December 2025 friendlies

Notes

- INJ - Injury
- PRE - Withdrawal prior to camp

== Coaches ==
- (United States) Jerry Smith (2001–2002)
- (United States) Chris Petrucelli (2003–2004)
- (United States) Jill Ellis (2005–2006)
- (Northern Ireland) Bill Irwin (2007–2011)
- (United States) Randy Waldrum (2012–2013)
- (United States) Steve Swanson (2013–2014)
- (United States) Janet Rayfield (2015–2016)
- (England) Laura Harvey (2017)
- (United States) B. J. Snow (2017–2019)
- (England) Matt Potter (2020–2022)
- (United States) Jené Baclawski (2022)
- (United States) Carrie Kveton (2023)
- (United States) Margueritte Aozasa (2023)
- (United States) Heather Dyche (2025–present)
