= Reilyn Turner =

American soccer player (born 2002)

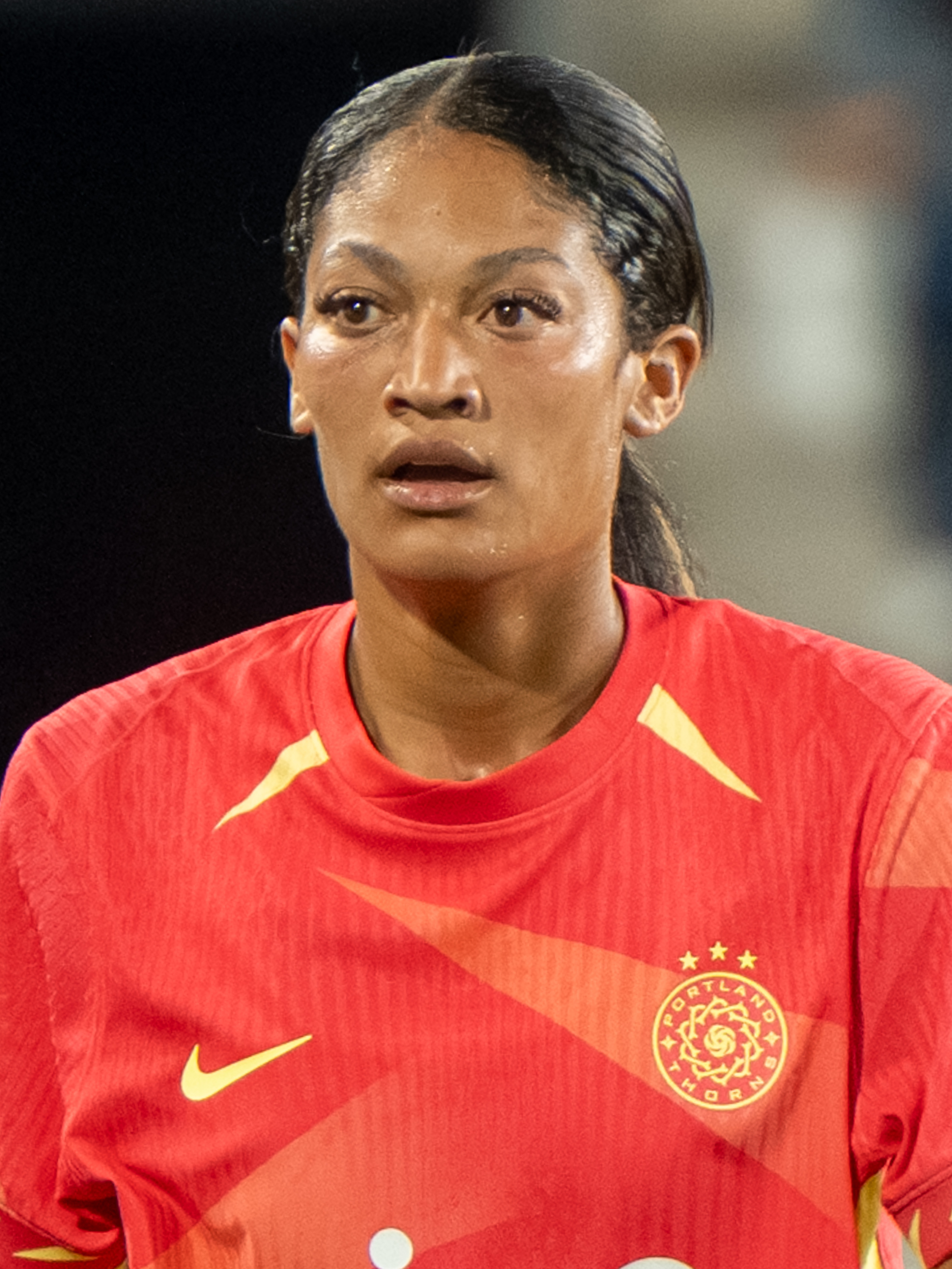
- Turner with the Portland Thorns in 2025

Personal information
- Full name: Reilyn Sky Turner
- Date of birth: October 18, 2002 (age 24)
- Place of birth: Lakewood, California, U.S.
- Height: 5 ft 9 in (1.75 m)
- Position: Forward

Team information
- Current team: Portland Thorns
- Number: 66

College career
Years	Team	Apps	(Gls)
2020–2023	UCLA Bruins	79	(42)

Senior career*
Years	Team	Apps	(Gls)
2024	Racing Louisville	16	(4)
2024–	Portland Thorns	52	(10)

International career^{‡}
2018	United States U17	2	(2)
2018–2020	United States U19	3	(4)
2024–2025	United States U23	3	(1)
2026–	United States	1	(1)
- * Club domestic league appearances and goals as of 18:02, November 11, 2026 (UTC) ‡ National team caps and goals as of January 24, 2026

Reilyn Sky Turner (born October 18, 2002) is an American professional soccer player who plays as a forward for Portland Thorns FC of the National Women's Soccer League (NWSL) and the United States national team. She played college soccer for UCLA Bruins, scoring the last-second equalizing goal in the 2022 national championship and earning the Pac-12 Forward of the Year award in 2023. She was drafted sixth overall by Racing Louisville FC in the 2024 NWSL Draft and then traded to the Thorns during her rookie season.

== Early life ==
Turner was born in Lakewood, California, to former National Football League (NFL) wide receiver Nate Turner and former UNLV soccer player Felicia Madrigal. She has an older sister, Blake, who played soccer at Columbia. She grew up in Aliso Viejo, California, and graduated from Laguna Beach High School.

== College career ==
Turner played for UCLA from 2020 to 2023, scoring 42 goals and assisting 16 more. She finished her collegiate career ranking fifth all-time at UCLA in goals, game-winning goals and multi-game goals and sixth in total points. In 2021, she became the first college athlete to sign a name, image, and likeness (NIL) deal with the sportswear company Nike.

In 2022, Turner scored the game-winning goal in the 2022 College Cup semifinals and the game-tying goal in the ensuing championship match, helping UCLA win its second national championship. She was named to the All-Tournament Team in addition to claiming Most Outstanding Offensive Player honors.

As a senior in 2023, Turner became the first player in UCLA program history to win the Pac-12 Forward of the Year award. She was named a second-team All-American by United Soccer Coaches.

== Club career ==
=== Racing Louisville FC ===
One of the top forward prospects in the 2024 NWSL Draft, Turner was the No. 6 pick in the first round, selected by Racing Louisville FC. She became the fifth first-round pick in Racing's history, joining Emily Fox, Emina Ekic, Jaelin Howell, and Savannah DeMelo. On February 21, 2024, Turner signed her first professional contract with Racing Louisville. In a 2024 away game against Seattle Reign, she scored the equalizer in the 97th minute, making it 1–1.

=== Portland Thorns FC ===
On August 21, 2024, Racing Louisville FC announced that they had traded Turner to Portland Thorns FC in exchange for Janine Beckie. Turner made her Thorns debut three days later, entering the match as a substitute in a 2–0 defeat to NJ/NY Gotham FC. On September 4, 2024, Turner scored her first goal with Portland in a CONCACAF W Champions Cup victory over Club América. The Thorns would later go on to advance to the NWSL playoffs, where they faced off against Gotham FC in the first round. Turner scored the game's equalizer in the 75th minute, but the Thorns later conceded a costly goal by Rose Lavelle and were eliminated from the playoffs.

== International career ==
Turner has played for the U.S. Youth National Team at a number of levels, including participation in the 2018 CONCACAF U-17 Championship, where she scored twice. She was called up by Emma Hayes into Futures Camp, practicing concurrently the senior national team, in January 2025.

Emma Hayes called up Turner to the senior national team for the first time in January 2026. She made her USWNT debut and scored her first senior international goal to open the scoring in a 6–0 friendly win against Paraguay on January 24.

== Career statistics ==
=== Club ===
As of December 28, 2024

Appearances and goals by club, season and competition
Club	Season	League			Cup (Note: Includes the NWSL Challenge Cup)		Playoffs (Note: Includes NWSL Playoffs)		Continental (Note: Includes CONCACAF W Champions Cup)		Other		Total	
Club	Season	Division	Apps	Goals	Apps	Goals	Apps	Goals	Apps	Goals	Apps	Goals	Apps	Goals
Racing Louisville FC	2024	NWSL	16	4	—		—		—		3 (Note: Includes NWSL x Liga MX Femenil Summer Cup)	1	19	5
Portland Thorns FC	2024	NWSL	6	0	—		1	1	2	2	0	0	9	3
Career total			22	4	0	0	1	1	2	2	3	1	28	8

=== International ===
As of match played January 24, 2026

National Team	Year	Apps	Goals
United States	2026	1	1
Total		1	1

List of international goals scored by Reilyn Turner
No.	Date	Venue	Opponent	Score	Result	Competition	Ref.
1	January 24, 2026	Carson, California, United States	Paraguay	1–0	6–0	Friendly	

== Honors and awards ==
UCLA Bruins

- NCAA Division I women's soccer tournament: 2022
- Pac-12 Conference: 2020, 2021, 2023

Individual

- Second-team All-American: 2023
- First-team All-Pac-12: 2020, 2022, 2023
- Second-team All-Pac-12: 2021
- Pac-12 Forward of the Year: 2023
- Pac-12 Freshman of the Year: 2020
