= Brittany Raphino =

American soccer player (born 2000)

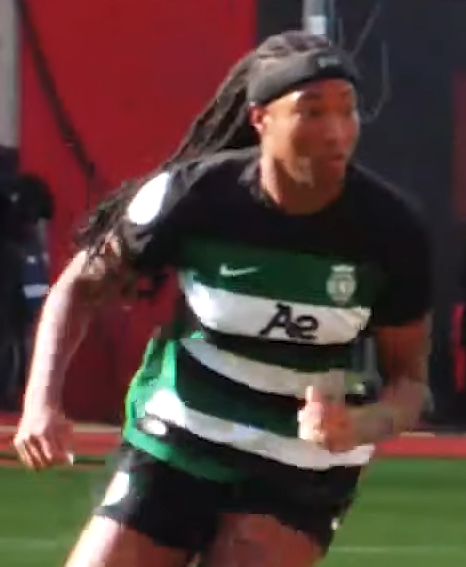
- Raphino with Sporting CP in 2025

Personal information
- Full name: Brittany Cyrenie Raphino
- Date of birth: October 30, 2000 (age 26)
- Height: 5 ft 10 in (1.78 m)
- Position: Forward

Team information
- Current team: Inter Milan

Youth career
- Scorpions SC

College career
| Years | Team | Apps | (Gls) |
| 2019–2023 | Brown Bears | 69 | (42) |

Senior career*
| Years | Team | Apps | (Gls) |
| 2024–2026 | Sporting CP | 22 | (17) |
| 2026– | Inter Milan | 0 | (0) |

International career
| 2023 | United States U23 | 0 | (0) |
| 2026– | Haiti | 0 | (0) |
- * Club domestic league appearances and goals as of 6 April 2026

Brittany Cyrenie Raphino (born October 30, 2000) is a professional soccer player who plays as a forward for Serie A Women club Inter Milan. Born in the United States, she plays for the Haiti national team. She played college soccer for the Brown Bears, earning All-American honors three times. She started her professional career with Portuguese club Sporting CP in 2024.

== Early life ==
Raphino grew up in Randolph, Massachusetts, one of three children born to Natasha and Lubens Raphino. Her father is originally from Haiti. She began playing soccer at age three. She attended Thayer Academy, where she starred on the soccer team alongside future United States international Ally Sentnor and also played basketball. She scored 87 goals during her high school career, earning two-time All-American honors. She played club soccer for Scorpions SC, leading the ECNL with 30 goals one season and receiving ECNL All-American recognition. She committed to play college soccer at Brown University when she was a sophomore.

== College career ==
Raphino scored 8 goals with 3 assists in 19 games in her freshman season with the Brown Bears in 2019, earning Ivy League Rookie of the Year, first-team All-Ivy, and second-team TopDrawerSoccer Freshman Best XI honors. She helped Brown win the Ivy League championship and qualify for the NCAA tournament, both of which achievements Brown was doing for the first time since 1994, and which they would accomplish all four years Raphino played for the program. In the NCAA tournament, she scored the winning shootout penalty to advance to face Florida State in the second round.

Following the 2020 season being canceled along with all Ivy League sports due to the COVID-19 pandemic, Raphino returned to action in 2021, leading the Ivy League with 11 goals and adding 6 assists in 16 games. She scored a hat trick in a 3–2 win against Yale that clinched the outright conference title for Brown. She was named first-team All-Ivy, Ivy League Offensive Player of the Year, and second-team All-American. In her junior season in 2022, she ranked second in the league with 10 goals and had 4 assists, repeating as first-team All-Ivy and Ivy League Offensive Player of the Year and earning first-team All-American honors. She equalized in a loss to UC Irvine in the second round of the NCAA tournament.

Raphino set career highs in her senior season in 2023, leading the Ivy League with 13 goals and providing 7 assists in 17 games. She was named first-team All-Ivy for a fourth time, Ivy League Offensive Player of the Year for a third time, and first-team All-American for a second time. During her tenure at Brown, Raphino was described by head coach Kia McNeill as "the heartbeat of this team".

== Club career ==
=== Sporting CP ===
Raphino was predicted to be an early selection in the 2024 NWSL Draft, but instead signed her first professional contract in Portugal's Campeonato Nacional Feminino, joining Sporting CP on a two-and-a-half-year deal on January 31, 2024. She made her professional debut three days later as a substitute in a 2–0 win over Valadares Gaia. On February 10, she scored her first professional goal with the extra-time winner in a 1–0 victory over Damaiense to send Sporting to the Taça de Portugal Feminina semifinals. She scored her first league goals with the first and last in a 3–0 win against Torreense on March 9. On April 14, she had a goal and assist in a 3–1 victory over Benfica to keep Sporting in title contention, but they finished runners-up.

Raphino began the 2024–25 season by scoring both goals in a 2–0 win over Racing Power in the Supertaça de Portugal Feminina semifinals on August 18, 2024, then won her first professional trophy after a 2–1 win over Benfica in the final. The following month, she made her European debut and started all four UEFA Women's Champions League qualifying games, being eliminated by Real Madrid in the last qualifying round. On January 25, 2025, she bagged five goals in the second half of her team's 9–0 demolition of Vilaverdense. On February 12, she scored twice in a 2–1 second-leg win over Damaiense to confirm Sporting in the Taça da Liga Feminina final.

Raphino scored her first goals of the 2025–26 season with a hat trick in a 4–0 win over Marítimo on October 11, 2025.

=== Inter Milan ===
On July 10, 2026, Raphino signed a three-year contract with Italian club Inter Milan.

== International career ==
Raphino was called up to the United States under-23 team to play against NWSL competition in the 2023 preseason. She is also eligible to play for the Haiti national team through her father's country of birth.

Raphino received her first call-up for the Haiti national team for two 2026 CONCACAF W Championship qualification matches against Anguilla on April 9 and the Dominican Republic on April 17, with both matches held at Stade Roger Zami in Le Gosier, Guadeloupe.

== Honors and awards ==
Brown Bears

- Ivy League: 2019, 2021, 2022, 2023

Sporting CP

- Supertaça de Portugal Feminina: 2024

Individual

- First-team All-American: 2022, 2023
- Second-team All-American: 2021
- First-team All-Ivy League: 2019, 2021, 2022, 2023
- Ivy League Offensive Player of the Year: 2021, 2022, 2023
- Ivy League Freshman of the Year: 2019
