= 2025 NWSL Championship =

Women's soccer match in California, US

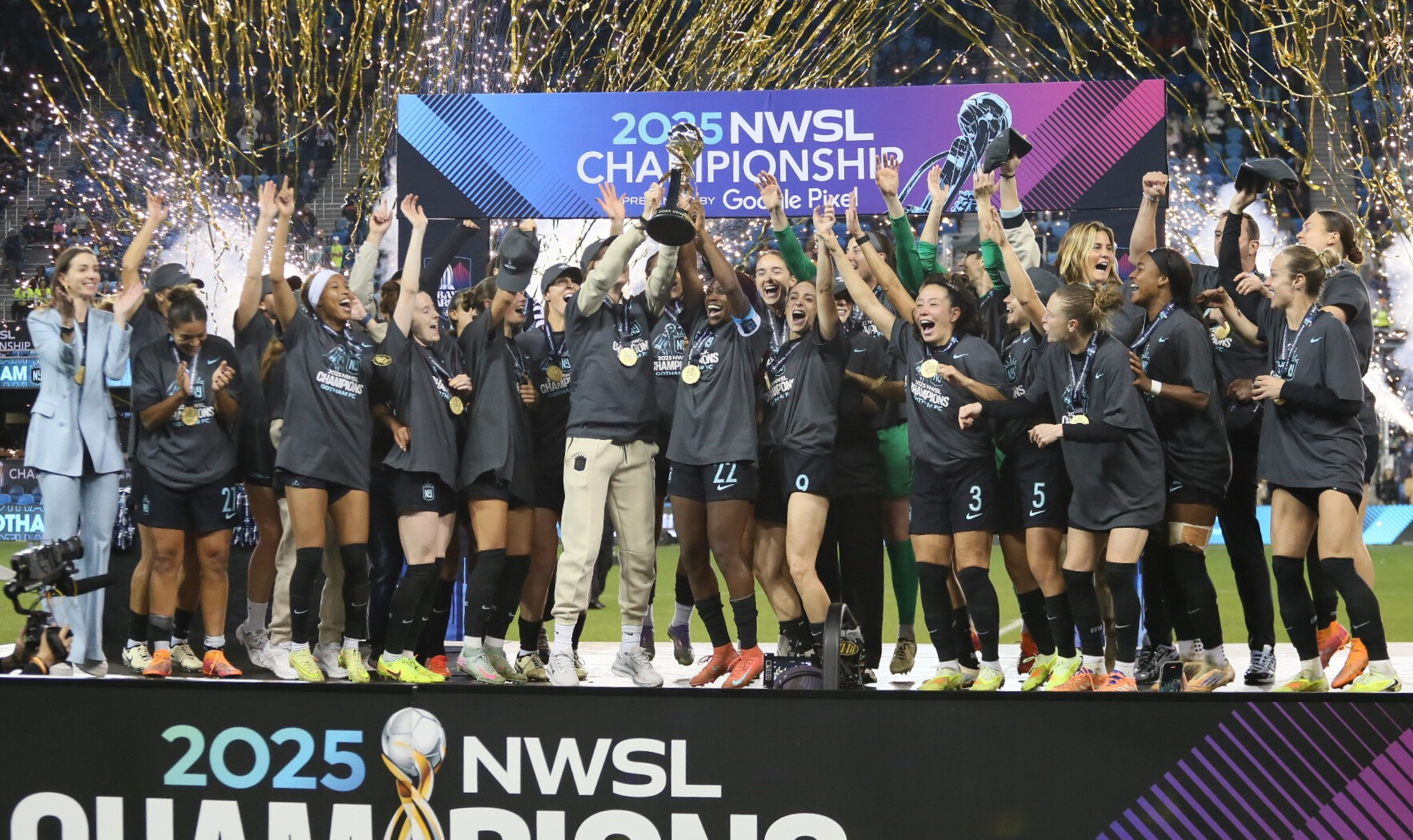
- Gotham celebrating the win
- Event: NWSL Championship
Washington Spirit	Gotham FC
0	1
- Date: November 22, 2025
- Venue: PayPal Park, San Jose, California, U.S.
- Most Valuable Player: Rose Lavelle
- Referee: Natalie Simon
- Attendance: 18,000

The 2025 NWSL Championship was the 12th edition of the NWSL Championship, the championship match of the National Women's Soccer League (NWSL), and took place on November 22, 2025. Gotham FC won 1–0 against the Washington Spirit to become NWSL champions for the second time. The match was played at PayPal Park in San Jose, California.

== Road to the final ==
=== Washington Spirit ===
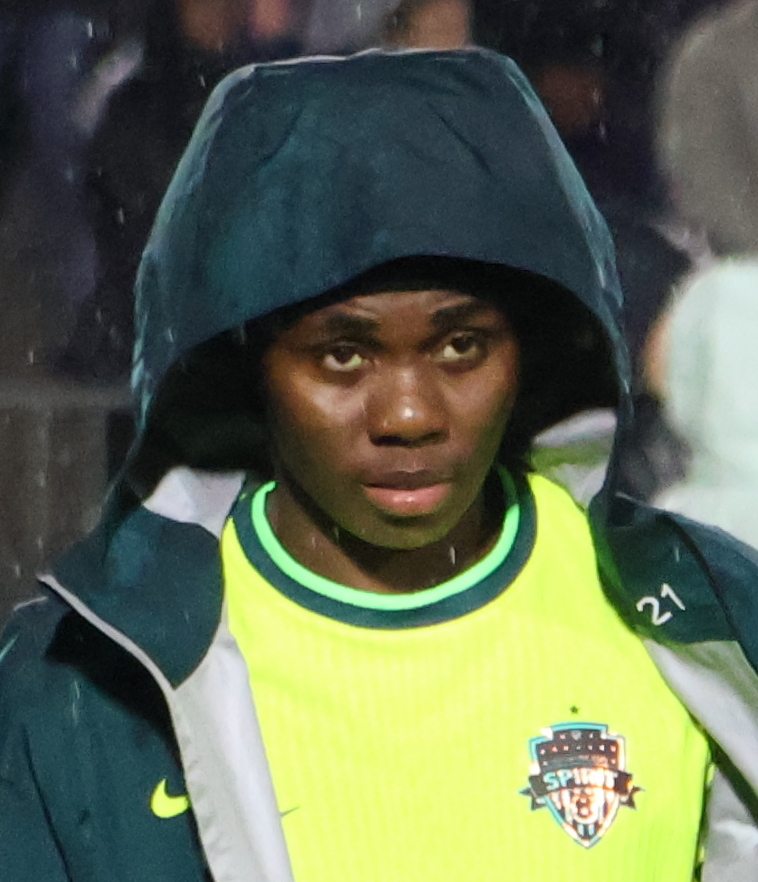
Gift Monday scored in both playoff matches leading up to the final.

After finishing second in the table and losing to the Orlando Pride in the 2024 NWSL Championship, the Washington Spirit repeated their second-place finish in the 2025 regular season. Majority owner Michele Kang promoted assistant coach Adrián González to head coach midseason after moving Jonatan Giráldez to her other property OL Lyonnes. The team navigated numerous injuries over the season including limited availability for star winger Trinity Rodman. Tara McKeown, just three years after converting to center back, was named NWSL Defender of the Year, while reigning NWSL Rookie of the Year Croix Bethune was also named in the NWSL Best XI.

In the playoff quarterfinals, the Spirit advanced 3–1 on penalties after a 1–1 draw with the seventh seed Racing Louisville. Washington's leading scorer Gift Monday opened the scoring with a header from Rosemonde Kouassi's cross before Kayla Fischer equalized for the playoff debutants in stoppage time. After a scoreless overtime, Washington goalkeeper Aubrey Kingsbury saved two penalty kicks and another Racing player missed in the resulting shootout. In the semifinals, the Spirit won 2–0 against the third seed Portland Thorns. Monday again opened the scoring after a long drive by Kouassi, Bethune iced the game scoring into an open net after a giveaway, and Rodman made her return from injury after a month absence. Washington advanced to their second consecutive NWSL final and fourth in club history. Rodman's impending free agency dominated headlines in the week before the final.

=== Gotham FC ===
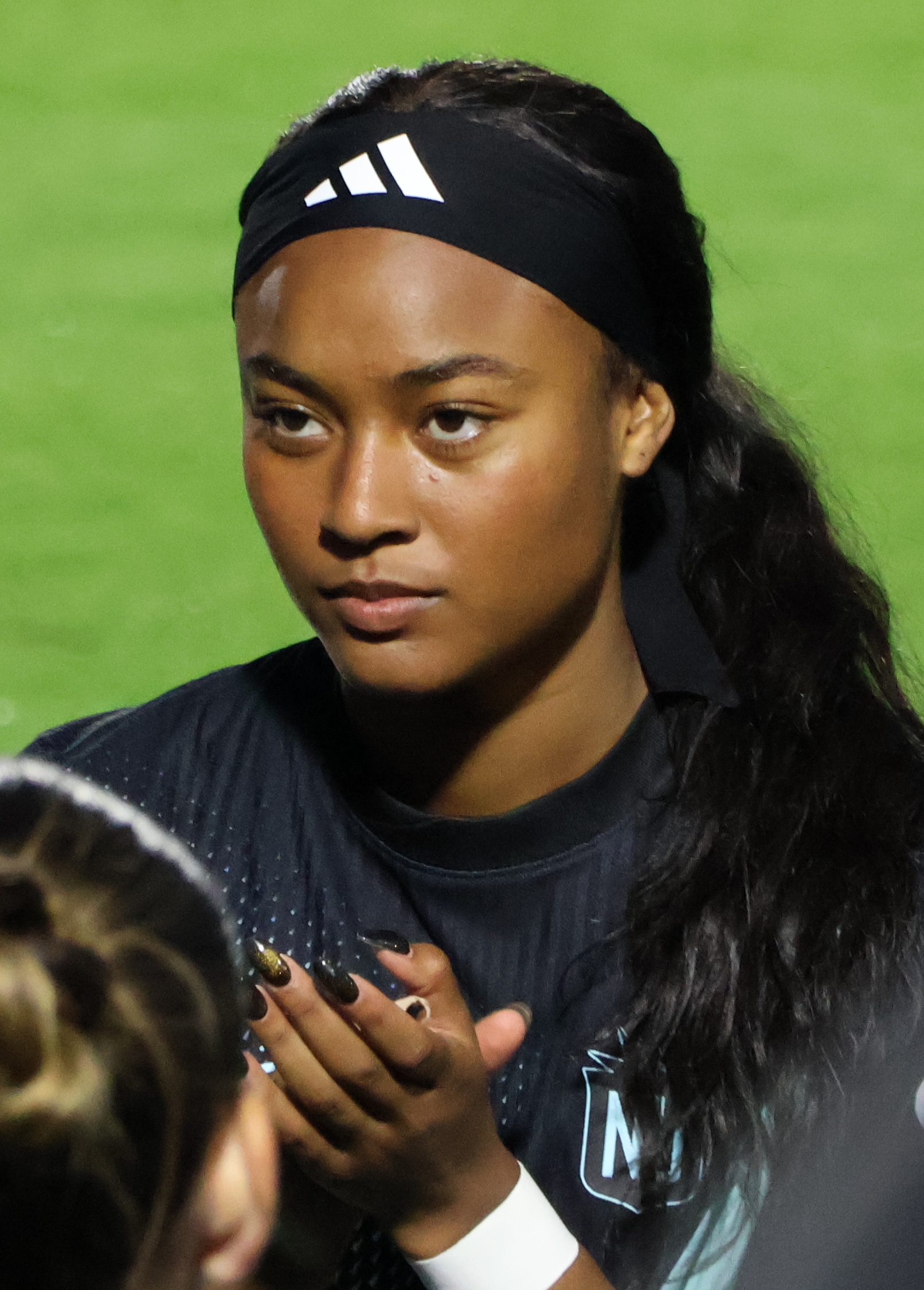
Jaedyn Shaw was involved in all three goals (two goals, one assist) in Gotham's run to the final.

After finishing third and losing to Spirit on penalties in the 2024 playoff semifinals, Gotham FC placed eighth in the 2025 regular-season standings, earning the final playoff berth. During the season, the team collected their first piece of hardware since the 2023 NWSL Championship by winning the inaugural 2024–25 CONCACAF W Champions Cup. Jaedyn Shaw joined the team midseason in a record intraleague trade from the North Carolina Courage. Despite placing eighth, NWSL Best XI selections Emily Sonnett and NWSL Rookie of the Year Lilly Reale anchored the second-best defense in the league, while Esther González was the runner-up for the NWSL Golden Boot.

In the playoff quarterfinals, Gotham upset the historic NWSL Shield winners Kansas City Current, who were missing two-time Golden Boot winner Temwa Chawinga. Shaw opened the scoring for Gotham before assisting Katie Stengel – another midseason signing who returned to the club after a stint with Crystal Palace – in extra time to secure the 2–1 win. In the semifinals, Gotham won 1–0 against the fourth seed and defending champion Orlando Pride. Shaw scored directly from a free kick in stoppage time, the ball bouncing past goalkeeper Anna Moorhouse, to send Gotham to their second NWSL final in three years. Having won their first title as the then-lowest sixth seed in 2023, Gotham this year became the first eight seed in the expanded playoff format to reach the NWSL final.

== Venue and broadcasting ==
The game was held at PayPal Park in San Jose, California, the home stadium of the NWSL's Bay FC and Major League Soccer (MLS)'s San Jose Earthquakes. It was televised in the United States on CBS and streamed on Paramount+.

== Match ==
=== Summary ===
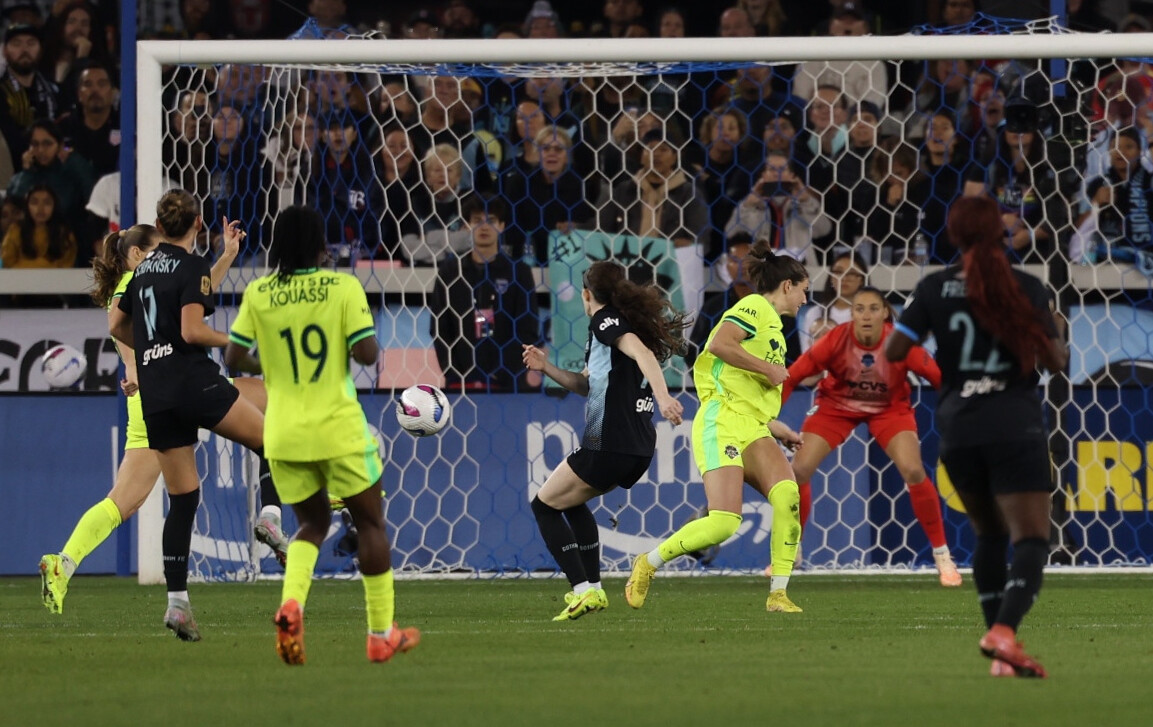
Rose Lavelle scoring the lone goal in the match.

The match was the 44th meeting between the Spirit and Gotham in all competitions, the most between any two NWSL teams. Shaw attempted at goal on kickoff but was wide. Gotham began the game on the front foot with effective press and several attacks down the right wing, with Shaw getting the first half's only shot on target in the sixth minute. Washington settled into the match, but the first half produced few clear chances, though good level of intensity on both sides. Reale was booked for fouling Kouassi at midfield just before halftime, which the teams entered at 0–0, and she was later pulled for Bruninha after coming close to another card for shoving Kouassi. Like in previous Washington games, fans chanted "Free DC" in the 51st minute. Washington played with ten for several minutes while Hal Hershfelt was treated on the sideline after her collision with Rose Lavelle. Lavelle then opened the scoring for Gotham in the 80th minute, running on to strike the ball from the top of the box, with Hershfelt near Bruninha's pass but unable to challenge the play. It was the latest opening goal in NWSL final history and stood as Gotham won 1–0 to become NWSL champions for the second time in three years.

=== Details ===
November 22, 2025
5:00 PST

Washington Spirit	0–1	Gotham FC
	Report	Lavelle 80'

PayPal Park, San Jose, California
Attendance: 18,000
Referee: Natalie Simon (Florida)

Washington Spirit	Gotham FC

GK	1	(United States) Aubrey Kingsbury (c)
LB	6	(United States) Kate Wiesner	(substituted off) 90'
CB	9	(United States) Tara McKeown
CB	4	(Mexico) Rebeca Bernal
RB	24	(England) Esme Morgan
DM	17	(United States) Hal Hershfelt	(substituted off) 81'
AM	7	(United States) Croix Bethune
AM	10	(Colombia) Leicy Santos
LW	7	(Italy) Sofia Cantore	(substituted off) 57'
FW	21	(Nigeria) Gift Monday
RW	19	(Ivory Coast) Rosemonde Kouassi
Substitutes:
GK	28	(Scotland) Sandy MacIver
FW	2	(United States) Trinity Rodman	(substituted on) 57'
MF	5	(Japan) Narumi Miura
FW	13	(United States) Brittany Ratcliffe
MF	16	(United States) Courtney Brown
MF	20	(Nigeria) Deborah Abiodun	(substituted on) 81'
MF	22	(United States) Heather Stainbrook
DF	25	(France) Kysha Sylla
DF	26	(United States) Paige Metayer	(substituted on) 90'
Manager:
(Spain) Adrián González

GK	30	(Germany) Ann-Katrin Berger
LB	4	(United States) Lilly Reale	(yellow card) 45+3'	(substituted off) 63'
CB	27	(England) Jess Carter
CB	6	(United States) Emily Sonnett
RB	22	(United States) Mandy Freeman (c)
DM	7	(United States) Jaelin Howell
AM	2	(United States) Jaedyn Shaw
AM	16	(United States) Rose Lavelle
LW	11	(United States) Sarah Schupansky
FW	9	(Spain) Esther González
RW	23	(United States) Midge Purce
Substitutes:
GK	1	(United States) Shelby Hogan
DF	2	(Brazil) Bruninha	(yellow card) 90+3'	(substituted on) 63'
MF	5	(Denmark) Josefine Hasbo
FW	10	(Brazil) Geyse
FW	13	(United States) Ella Stevens
MF	18	(Brazil) Gabi Portilho
DF	19	(United States) Kayla Duran
MF	21	(United States) Sofia Cook
FW	28	(United States) Katie Stengel
Manager:
(Spain) Juan Carlos Amorós

NWSL Championship Most Valuable Player:
(United States) Rose Lavelle

Assistant referees:
Chris Schurfranz (United States)
Matt Trotter (United States)
Fourth official:
Nabil Bensalah (United States)
Video assistant referee:
Shawn Tehini (United States)

Match rules

- 90 minutes.
- 30 minutes of extra time if necessary.
- Penalty shootout if scores still level.
- Maximum of five substitutions.
