= Laney Egbuka =

American soccer player (born 2004)

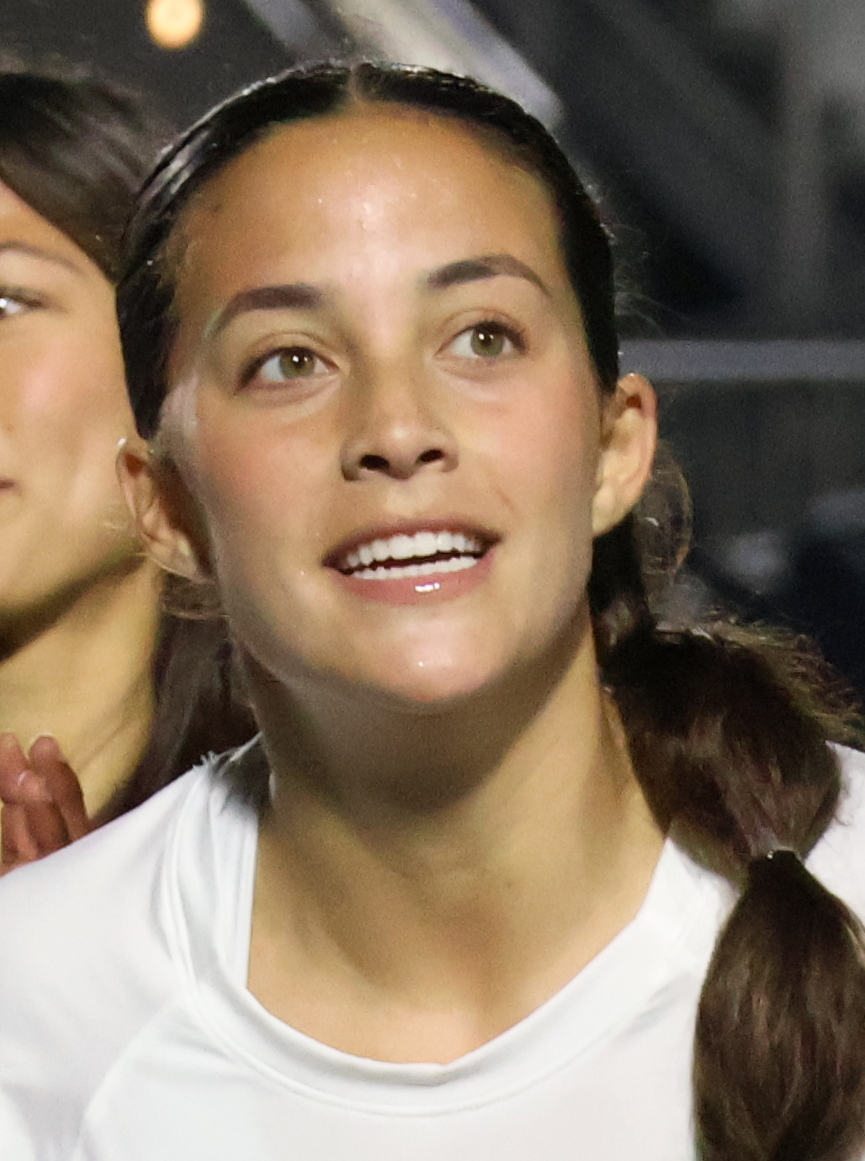
- Egbuka with Notre Dame in 2025

Personal information
- Full name: Delaney Matriano
- Date of birth: May 20, 2004 (age 22)
- Height: 5 ft 7 in (1.70 m)
- Position: Defensive midfielder

Team information
- Current team: BK Häcken
- Number: 5

Youth career
- Cleveland FC
- 2018–2021: Willoughby South Rebels

College career
Years	Team	Apps	(Gls)
2022–2025	Notre Dame Fighting Irish	77	(5)

Senior career*
Years	Team	Apps	(Gls)
2020–2021	Cleveland Ambassadors	–	(–)
2026–	BK Häcken	22	(2)
- * Club domestic league appearances and goals as of November 2, 2026

Delaney Egbuka (née Matriano; born May 20, 2004) is an American professional soccer player who plays as a defensive midfielder for Damallsvenskan club BK Häcken. She played college soccer for the Notre Dame Fighting Irish.

== Early life ==
Egbuka grew up in Willoughby, Ohio. She attended South High School in Willoughby, where she played soccer, basketball, and softball. She played club soccer for Cleveland FC, leading the team to the USYS under-15 national title in 2018. She also played for the Cleveland Ambassadors in the Women's Premier Soccer League (WPSL). She committed to play college soccer for the Notre Dame Fighting Irish in her senior year.

== College career ==
Egbuka was an immediate starter for the Notre Dame Fighting Irish in 2022, one of two freshman starters alongside defender Leah Klenke. She helped the Irish place third in the Atlantic Coast Conference (ACC) and earn a one seed in the NCAA tournament, where she scored a goal on the way to the quarterfinals. She helped the team finish ACC runners-up as a sophomore in 2023. She led the team in minutes played in her junior year in 2024, serving as team captain and reaching the NCAA tournament quarterfinals. She recorded career highs with 3 goals and 8 assists in her senior year in 2025. She helped the Irish finish second in the ACC standings and reach a program first ACC tournament final. Notre Dame earned the overall top seed in the NCAA tournament but were upset in the second round. She played in 77 games, starting 72, and scored 5 goals over four seasons in South Bend.

== Club career ==
Swedish champions BK Häcken announced on February 6, 2026, that they had signed Egbuka to her first professional contract on a three-year deal. She made her professional debut two weeks later, coming on as a first-half injury substitute for Helena Sampaio in a 4–1 win over Breiðablik in the second leg of the UEFA Women's Europa Cup quarterfinals. She made her first professional start on March 11, playing the full 90 minutes in a 3–0 win over Linköping in the Swedish Women's Cup.

On May 1, 2026, Egbuka spelled club captain Anna Anvegård for the last minutes of the Europa Cup final against Hammarby, helping Häcken see out the second leg 3–2 (aggregate 4–2) to become the inaugural champions of the competition. On August 9, she scored her first professional goal in a 4–1 league victory over Piteå. She made her UEFA Women's Champions League debut on September 22, starting in a 1–0 loss to Italian club Inter Milan. On November 2, she played in a 4–1 win over Kristianstad as Häcken secured their second consecutive league title.

== International career ==
Egbuka was called into training camps with the United States under-14 team in 2018 and the under-18/under-19 and under-20 teams in 2023.

== Personal life ==
Egbuka announced her engagement to football player Emeka Egbuka in January 2026. The couple married on July 3, 2026.

== Honors ==
BK Häcken

- Damallsvenskan: 2026
- UEFA Women's Europa Cup: 2025–26
