= 2022 NCAA Division I women's soccer tournament =

2022 NCAA women's soccer tournament
Women's College Cup (Semifinals & Final)

Tournament details
- Country: United States
- Dates: November 11 – December 5, 2022
- Teams: 64

Final positions
- Champions: (1) UCLA (2nd title)
- Runners-up: (2) North Carolina
- Semifinalists: (1) Alabama; (1) Florida State

Tournament statistics
- Matches played: 63
- Goals scored: 213 (3.38 per match)
- Attendance: 101,407 (1,610 per match)
- Top goal scorer(s): (Canada) Jessica De Filippo, Arkansas (United States) Michelle Cooper, Duke (6 goals)

Awards
- Best player: Reilyn Turner (offensive); Lilly Reale (defensive)
- All statistics correct as of 12/6/2022.

The 2022 NCAA Division I women's soccer tournament in the United States was the 41st edition of the NCAA Division I Women's Soccer Tournament, a postseason tournament to determine the national champion of NCAA Division I women's college soccer. The College Cup was played on December 2 and December 5 at WakeMed Soccer Park in Cary, North Carolina.

Florida State was the defending National Champion and were unable to defend their title after falling to North Carolina in the semifinals. North Carolina would go on to lose in overtime in the final to UCLA 2–3.

The 2022 title was UCLA's second in program history and first under head coach Margueritte Aozasa. Aozasa became the first coach in NCAA women's soccer history to win the title in her first year as head coach.

== Qualification ==
All Division I women's soccer programs are eligible to qualify for the tournament. 28 teams received automatic bids by winning their conference tournaments, 3 teams received automatic bids by claiming the conference regular season crown (Ivy League, Pac-12 Conference, and West Coast Conference don't hold conference tournaments), and an additional 33 teams earned at-large bids based on their regular season records.

Automatic bids
| Conference | Team | Date qualified | Record | Appearance | Last Bid |
|---|---|---|---|---|---|
| ACC | Florida State | November 6 | 13–2–3 | 23rd | 2021 |
| America East | New Hampshire | November 6 | 9–5–3 | 2nd | 2014 |
| American | Memphis | November 6 | 9–5–5 | 11th | 2021 |
| ASUN | Florida Gulf Coast | November 4 | 12–5–2 | 7th | 2017 |
| Atlantic 10 | Saint Louis | November 6 | 20–1–0 | 7th | 2021 |
| Big 12 | West Virginia | November 6 | 10–4–7 | 22nd | 2020 |
| Big East | Georgetown | November | 14–1–5 | 13th | 2021 |
| Big Sky | Northern Arizona | November 5 | 10–5–4 | 4th | 2019 |
| Big South | Radford | November 6 | 12–3–4 | 9th | 2019 |
| Big Ten | Penn State | November 6 | 13–4–3 | 28th | 2021 |
| Big West | UC Irvine | November 6 | 10–5–6 | 4th | 2021 |
| CAA | Hofstra | November 5 | 10–7–4 | 10th | 2021 |
| C-USA | UTSA | November 6 | 12–5–4 | 2nd | 2010 |
| Horizon | Milwaukee | November 5 | 12–3–3 | 16th | 2021 |
| Ivy | Brown | November 5 | 11–2–2 | 9th | 2021 |
| MAAC | Quinnipiac | November 6 | 15–2–1 | 2nd | 2000 |
| MAC | Buffalo | November 6 | 15–1–4 | 2nd | 2014 |
| Missouri Valley | Missouri State | November 6 | 12–6–2 | 3rd | 2017 |
| Mountain West | San Jose State | November 5 | 8–6–7 | 4th | 2018 |
| Northeast | Fairleigh Dickinson | November 6 | 8–10–3 | 2nd | 2015 |
| Ohio Valley | SIU Edwardsville | November 6 | 8–5–4 | 5th | 2021 |
| Pac-12 | Stanford | November 4 | 16–2–2 | 31st | 2021 |
| Patriot | Bucknell | November 6 | 7–6–6 | 6th | 2021 |
| SEC | South Carolina | November 6 | 13–3–5 | 16th | 2021 |
| SoCon | Samford | November 6 | 11–3–7 | 7th | 2021 |
| Southland | Lamar | November 6 | 15–1–2 | 3rd | 2019 |
| Summit League | Omaha | November 5 | 7–8–6 | 1st | None |
| Sun Belt | Old Dominion | November 6 | 9–8–3 | 3rd | 2021 |
| SWAC | Jackson State | November 6 | 10–7–1 | 3rd | 2013 |
| WAC | New Mexico State | November 6 | 13–4–3 | 1st | None |
| West Coast | Santa Clara | November 5 | 10–6–3 | 32nd | 2021 |

At-Large Bids
| Conference | Team | Record | Appearance | Last Bid |
|---|---|---|---|---|
| ACC | Clemson | 8–4–5 | 23rd | 2021 |
| ACC | Duke | 12–4–3 | 28th | 2021 |
| ACC | NC State | 7–7–5 | 17th | 2021 |
| ACC | North Carolina | 15–4–1 | 41st | 2021 |
| ACC | Notre Dame | 14–2–3 | 28th | 2021 |
| ACC | Pittsburgh | 12–4–3 | 1st | None |
| ACC | Virginia | 13–3–3 | 35th | 2021 |
| ACC | Virginia Tech | 10–6–2 | 12th | 2021 |
| ACC | Wake Forest | 9–6–3 | 22nd | 2021 |
| American | UCF | 9–2–5 | 22nd | 2017 |
| Big 12 | TCU | 12–4–5 | 7th | 2021 |
| Big 12 | Texas | 14–2–4 | 16th | 2021 |
| Big East | Xavier | 13–3–5 | 5th | 2021 |
| Big Ten | Michigan State | 16–2–3 | 5th | 2009 |
| Big Ten | Northwestern | 14–4–2 | 7th | 2018 |
| Big Ten | Ohio State | 10–5–3 | 15th | 2021 |
| Big Ten | Rutgers | 13–4–2 | 17th | 2021 |
| Ivy | Harvard | 11–1–3 | 18th | 2021 |
| Pac-12 | Arizona State | 9–5–3 | 9th | 2020 |
| Pac-12 | California | 10–4–6 | 27th | 2019 |
| Pac-12 | UCLA | 17–2–0 | 26th | 2021 |
| Pac-12 | USC | 12–2–3 | 21st | 2021 |
| SEC | Alabama | 18–2–1 | 5th | 2021 |
| SEC | Arkansas | 11–3–4 | 9th | 2021 |
| SEC | Georgia | 12–5–3 | 10th | 2015 |
| SEC | LSU | 9–3–7 | 8th | 2021 |
| SEC | Mississippi State | 11–5–4 | 2nd | 2018 |
| SEC | Tennessee | 11–5–2 | 14th | 2021 |
| SEC | Texas A&M | 9–6–5 | 27th | 2020 |
| SEC | Vanderbilt | 11–4–4 | 12th | 2020 |
| WAC | Utah Valley | 13–3–3 | 4th | 2018 |
| West Coast | BYU | 10–2–6 | 23rd | 2021 |
| West Coast | Portland | 11–4–4 | 22nd | 2013 |

== Bracket ==
The bracket was announced on Monday, November 7, 2022. First round games were played on November 11, 12 or 13 at campus sites.

=== Florida State Bracket ===
First round Campus Sites
1 | Florida State* | 3
Florida Gulf Coast | 0
Lamar | 1
8 | LSU* | 3
5 | Georgetown* | 1
Hofstra | 0
Buffalo | 0
4 | Pittsburgh* | 1
3 | Arkansas* | 6
Missouri State | 0
Bucknell | 0
6 | Ohio State (a.e.t.)* | 1
7 | Mississippi State* | 2
New Mexico State | 1
Memphis | 1
2 | Saint Louis* | 0

Second round Regional Campus Sites
1 | Florida State* | 4
8 | LSU | 1
5 | Georgetown | 1
4 | Pittsburgh | 2
3 | Arkansas* | 5
6 | Ohio State | 2
7 | Mississippi State | 0
Memphis | 4

Round of 16; Regional Campus Sites
1 | Florida State | 3
4 | Pittsburgh | 0
3 | Arkansas (pen.) | 3 (3)
Memphis | 3 (2)

Quarterfinal; Campus Sites
1 | Florida State | 1
3 | Arkansas | 0

* Host institution

==== Schedule ====
===== First round =====
| November 11 | Mississippi State | 2–1 | New Mexico State | Starkville, MS |
| 4:00 p.m. EST | Alivia Buxton 45'; Maggie Wadsworth (yellow card) 70'; Rylie Combs 88' | Report | 74' Loma McNeese | Stadium: MSU Soccer Stadium; Attendance: 1,216; Referee: Albert Kyei-Mensah; Assistant referees: Sam Bierster; Wesley Collins; Fourth official: Ryan Campbell |

| November 11 | #5 Florida State | 3–0 | Florida Gulf Coast | Tallahassee, FL |
| 5:00 p.m. EST | Lauren Flynn 52'; Leilanni Nesbeth 62'; Beata Olsson (yellow card) 69'; Kaitlyn Zipay 76' | Report | (yellow card) 69' Erika Zschuppe | Stadium: Seminole Soccer Complex; Attendance: 1,347; Referee: Mario Maric; Assistant referees: Arnel Selman; Megan McDougall; Fourth official: Godwin Sevor |

| November 11 | Ohio State | 1–0 (a.e.t.) | Bucknell | Columbus, OH |
| 6:00 p.m. EST | Emma Sears 107' | Report | | Stadium: Jesse Owens Memorial Stadium; Attendance: 445; Referee: Eric Tattersall; Assistant referees: Maggie Short; Micheal Nickerson; Fourth official: Ryan Slack |

| November 11 | LSU | 3–1 | Lamar | Baton Rouge, LA |
| 6:30 p.m. EST | Wasila Diwura-Soale (yellow card) 5'; Ída Marín Hermannsdóttir (yellow card) 19', (goal) 32'; Mollee Swift 40' (pen.); Brenna McPartlan 64' | Report | (yellow card) 31' Isela Ramirez; (yellow card) 40' Kaisa Juvonen; (yellow card) 40' Team; (yellow card) 64' Abby Gemza; 81' Christine Kitaru | Stadium: LSU Soccer Stadium; Attendance: 1,524; Referee: DeShun Beard; Assistant referees: Sam Bilbo; Logan Reeves; Fourth official: Jennifer Politz |

| November 11 | #9 Arkansas | 6–0 | Missouri State | Fayetteville, AR |
| 7:30 p.m. EST | Ava Tankersley 1'; Jessica De Filippo 6', 16', 80'; Ellie Podojil 8'; Mia Wehby 90' | Report | | Stadium: Razorback Field; Attendance: 1,332; Referee: Andrew Ellsworth; Assistant referees: Shane Kennard; Matt Trotter; Fourth official: Brook Weiss |

| November 12 | #18 Georgetown | 1–0 | Hofstra | Washington, D.C. |
| 1:00 p.m. EST | Erika Harwood 61' | Report | | Stadium: Shaw Field; Attendance: 253; Referee: Eric Weisbrod; Assistant referees: Inga Maric; Eric Bray; Fourth official: Carlos Gomez |

| November 12 | #10 Saint Louis | 0–1 | Memphis | St. Louis, MO |
| 2:00 p.m. EST | Hannah Larson (yellow card) 58' | Report | Saorla Miller 64' | Stadium: Hermann Stadium; Attendance: 1,476; Referee: Shane Butler; Assistant referees: Shane Kennard; Emily Brownback; Fourth official: George Major |

| November 12 | #19 Pittsburgh | 1–0 | Buffalo | Pittsburgh, PA |
| 7:00 p.m. EST | Sarah Schupansky (yellow card) 34'; Leah Pais 85' | Report | | Stadium: Ambrose Urbanic Field; Attendance: 944; Referee: Lucas Feathers; Assistant referees: William Campbell; Cody Hack; Fourth official: Vincent Whitmore |

===== Second round =====
| November 18 | #19 Pittsburgh | 2–1 | #18 Georgetown | Tallahassee, FL |
| 2:00 p.m. EST | Sarah Schupansky 19'; Samiah Phiri (yellow card) 24'; Katie Zailski 38' | Report | 37' Claire Manning; (yellow card) 63' Team | Stadium: Seminole Soccer Complex; Attendance: 1,668; Referee: Alexandra Billeter; Assistant referees: Kendall McCardell; Jonathan Smith; Fourth official: Jonathan Billinski |

| November 18 | Mississippi State | 0–4 | Memphis | Fayetteville, AR |
| 5:00 p.m. EST | | Report | 24' Saorla Miller; 53' Mya Jones; 60' Grace Stordy; 83' Anne-Valerie Seto | Stadium: Razorback Field; Attendance: 1,196; Referee: Daniel Radford; Assistant referees: Ryan Starr; Nicholas Guerrero; Fourth official: Reza Namavar |

| November 18 | #5 Florida State | 4–1 | LSU | Tallahassee, FL |
| 5:30 p.m. EST | Jenna Nighswonger 21'; Ran Iwai 52'; Onyi Echegini 54'; Amelia Horton 79' | Report | 10' Wasila Diwura-Soale; (yellow card) 63' Meghan Johnson | Stadium: Seminole Soccer Complex; Attendance: 1,668; Referee: Sergii Demianchuk; Assistant referees: Khadime Sabara; Shevah Rezaee; Fourth official: Brandon Adams |

| November 18 | #9 Arkansas | 5–2 | Ohio State | Fayetteville, AR |
| 7:30 p.m. EST | Bea Franklin 15', 42'; Anna Podojil 25'; Zoe Susi (yellow card) 39'; Jessica De Filippo 52'; Ava Tankersley 83' | Report | 7', 85' Peyton McNamara; (yellow card) 24' Kayla Fischer | Stadium: Razorback Field; Attendance: 1,196; Referee: Travis Haight; Assistant referees: Tim Wagner; Daniel Ortega; Fourth official: Jose Lara-Mancia |

===== Round of 16 =====
| November 20 | #5 Florida State | 3–0 | #19 Pittsburgh | Tallahassee, FL |
| 5:00 p.m. EST | Beata Olsson 2'; Leilanni Nesbeth 47'; Jody Brown 57' | Report | | Stadium: Seminole Soccer Complex; Attendance: 1,238; Referee: Alyssa Nichols; Assistant referees: Kayla Polonsky; Brian Marshall; Fourth official: Logan Busby |

| November 20 | #9 Arkansas | 3–3 (a.e.t.) (3–2 p) | Memphis | Fayetteville, AR |
| 6:00 p.m. EST | Jessica De Filippo 11', 37'; Ava Tankersley (yellow card) 67'; Zoe Susi 81' | Report | (yellow card) 37' Kimberly Smit; 41' Lilly Huber; 44', (yellow card) 72' Jocelyn Alonzo; (yellow card) 72' Haylee Spray; 88' Mya Jones | Stadium: Razorback Field; Attendance: 1,519; Referee: Travis Haight; Assistant referees: Tim Wagner; Daniel Ortega; Fourth official: Jose Lara-Mancia |
| | Penalties |
| | Emilee Hauser (penalty scored); Ellie Podojil (penalty missed); Anna Podojil (penalty missed); Taylor Berman (penalty scored); Sierra Cota-Yarde (penalty scored) | | (penalty missed) Momo Nakao; (penalty scored) Eef Kerkhof; (penalty missed) Lilly Huber; (penalty scored) Anne-Valerie Seto; (penalty missed) Mya Jones |

===== Quarterfinals =====
| November 26 | #9 Arkansas | 0–1 | #5 Florida State | Tallahassee, FL |
| 6:00 p.m. EST | | Report | 53' (o.g.) Arkansas Own Goal | Stadium: Seminole Soccer Complex; Attendance: 2,667; Referee: Jonathan Weiner; Assistant referees: Sam Bilbo; Kendall McCardell; Fourth official: Arnel Selman |

Rankings from United Soccer Coaches Final Regular Season Rankings

=== Notre Dame Bracket ===
First round Campus Sites
2 | North Carolina* | 5
Old Dominion | 0
Samford | 0
7 | Georgia* | 2
6 | BYU* | 3
Utah Valley | 0
San Jose State | 0
3 | Stanford* | 6
4 | Michigan State (a.e.t.)* | 3
Milwaukee | 2
UTSA | 1
5 | TCU* | 3
8 | Santa Clara (a.e.t.)* | 1
California | 0
Omaha | 0
1 | Notre Dame* | 5

Second round Regional Campus Sites
2 | North Carolina* | 3
7 | Georgia | 1
6 | BYU (pen.) | 1 (5)
3 | Stanford | 1 (4)
4 | Michigan State | 0
5 | TCU | 1
8 | Santa Clara | 0
1 | Notre Dame* | 4

Round of 16; Regional Campus Sites
2 | North Carolina* | 3
6 | BYU | 2
5 | TCU | 0
1 | Notre Dame | 2

Quarterfinal; Campus Sites
2 | North Carolina | 2
1 | Notre Dame | 0

* Host institution

==== Schedule ====
===== First round =====
| November 11 | Georgia | 2–0 | Samford | Athens, GA |
| 6:00 p.m. EST | Dani Murguia 10'; Jessie Dunn 38' | Report | | Stadium: Turner Soccer Complex; Attendance: 951; Referee: Nicole Green; Assistant referees: Kayla Polonsky; Jarred Mosher; Fourth official: Kevin Maurer |

| November 11 | #6 Michigan State | 3–2 (a.e.t.) | Milwaukee | East Lansing, MI |
| 6:00 p.m. EST | Lauren DeBeau (yellow card) 50'; Justina Gaynor 56'; Celia Gaynor 77'; Mia Hansen (yellow card) 96'; Camryn Evans 105' | Report | 6' Natalie Auble; (yellow card) 18' Lainey Higgins; (yellow card) 30' Senya Meurer; 90' Kayla Rollins | Stadium: DeMartin Soccer Complex; Attendance: 2,592; Referee: Eulogio Villalpando; Assistant referees: Brad Barlog; Erin Patterson; Fourth official: Brett Willner |

| November 11 | #15 BYU | 3–0 | Utah Valley | Provo, UT |
| 8:00 p.m. EST | Allie Fryer 39'; Olivia Wade (yellow card) 67'; Tara Warner 70'; Rachel McCarthy 79'; Jamie Shepherd (yellow card) 81' | Report | (yellow card) 50' Jenna Shepherd; (yellow card) 58' Julianna Carter | Stadium: South Field; Attendance: 3,839; Referee: Bradley Miller; Assistant referees: Brad Church; Jordan Downs; Fourth official: Leo Vargas |

| November 11 | #17 TCU | 3–1 | UTSA | Fort Worth, TX |
| 8:00 p.m. EST | UTSA Own Goal 12' (o.g.); Oliva Hasler (yellow card) 20'; Brenna Brosam 82'; Camryn Lancaster 84' | Report | 24' Sasjah Dade; (yellow card) 35' Kendall Kloza | Stadium: Garvey-Rosenthal Stadium; Attendance: 804; Referee: Matthew Corrigan; Assistant referees: Brandon Queri; Josh Ell; Fourth official: Joel Mckell |

| November 11 | #7 Stanford | 6–0 | San Jose State | Stanford, CA |
| 10:00 p.m. EST | Jasmine Aikey 31', 49', 51', 52'; Maya Doms 34' (pen.); Logan Smith 59' | Report | (yellow card) 34' Kiana Miyazato | Stadium: Cagan Stadium; Attendance: 1,510; Referee: Peter Hanson; Assistant referees: Troy Thiele; Krystin Pahia; Fourth official: Jonathan Simon |

| November 12 | #4 Notre Dame | 5–0 | Omaha | Notre Dame, IN |
| 2:00 p.m. EST | Korbin Albert 6'; Olivia Wingate 8', 10'; Maddie Mercado 82'; Paige Peltier 85' | Report | | Stadium: Alumni Stadium; Attendance: 376; Referee: Heber Estrada; Assistant referees: Jake Brochu; Jaclyn Williams; Fourth official: Mykela Hawkins |

| November 12 | #23 Santa Clara | 1–0 (a.e.t.) | California | Santa Clara, CA |
| 4:00 p.m. EST | Ellie Glenn (yellow card) 79'; Izzy D'Aquila 110' | Report | (yellow card) 86' Sydney Collins | Stadium: Stevens Stadium; Attendance: 1,609; Referee: Christoper Spivey; Assistant referees: Sarah Cortez; Chris Elliott; Fourth official: Adriana Contreras |

| November 12 | #2 North Carolina | 5–0 | Old Dominion | Chapel Hill, NC |
| 7:00 p.m. EST | Ally Sentnor 6', 60'; Maddie Dahlien 29'; Avery Patterson 49'; Lauren Wrigley 89' | Report | | Stadium: Dorrance Field; Attendance: 1,531; Referee: John Rush; Assistant referees: Eric Usher; Colin Ashley; Fourth official: Shawn Meach |

===== Second round =====
| November 17 | #7 Stanford | 1–1 (a.e.t.) (4–5 p) | #15 BYU | Chapel Hill, NC |
| 3:00 p.m. EST | Jasmine Aikey 22' | Report | 4' Olivia Wade; (yellow card) 15' Kendell Petersen | Stadium: Dorrance Field; Attendance: 223; Referee: Mark Kadleck; Assistant referees: Raymond Thomas; Marcus Moss; Fourth official: Emma Richards |
| | Penalties |
| | Abby Greubel (penalty scored); Maya Doms (penalty scored); Julia Leontini (penalty scored); Jasmine Aikey (penalty scored); Elise Evans (penalty missed) | | (penalty scored) Brecken Mozingo; (penalty scored) Olivia Wade; (penalty scored) Olivia Smith; (penalty scored) Laveni Vaka; (penalty scored) Ellie Maughan |

| November 17 | #2 North Carolina | 3–1 | Georgia | Chapel Hill, NC |
| 6:00 p.m. EST | Ally Sentnor 23', 57'; Talia DellaPeruta 51' | Report | 77' Madison Haugen; (yellow card) 84' Abby Boyan | Stadium: Dorrance Field; Attendance: 1,152; Referee: Stephen Foster; Assistant referees: Aaron Gallagher; Benjamin Wooten; Fourth official: Daniel Burak |

| November 18 | #6 Michigan State | 0–1 | #17 TCU | Notre Dame, IN |
| 2:00 p.m. EST | Bria Schrotenboer (yellow card) 76' | Report | 3' Camryn Lancaster; (yellow card) 70' Messiah Bright; (yellow card) 87' Payton Crews | Stadium: Alumni Stadium; Attendance: 221; Referee: Nicholas Balcer; Assistant referees: Maggie Short; Khalaf Al-Latayfeh; Fourth official: Heber Estrada |

| November 18 | #4 Notre Dame | 4–0 | #23 Santa Clara | Notre Dame, IN |
| 6:00 p.m. EST | Korbin Albert 44' (pen.), 48'; Laney Matriano 48'; Kiki Van Zanten 61'; Sophia Fisher (yellow card) 90' | Report | | Stadium: Alumni Stadium; Attendance: 442; Referee: Nicole Green; Assistant referees: Andrew Bigelow; Christian Little; Fourth official: Christopher Koloffon |

===== Round of 16 =====
| November 19 | #2 North Carolina | 3–2 | #15 BYU | Chapel Hill, NC |
| 11:30 a.m. EST | Talia DellaPeruta 13'; Avery Patterson (yellow card) 53'; Maddie Dahlien 58', 65' | Report | 19' Olivia Wade; 69' Allie Fryer | Stadium: Dorrance Field; Attendance: 1,605; Referee: Lucas Feathers; Assistant referees: Bill Dittmar; Duane Paquette; Fourth official: John Matto |

| November 20 | #4 Notre Dame | 2–0 | #17 TCU | Notre Dame, IN |
| 6:30 p.m. EST | Maddie Mercado (yellow card) 11', (goal) 65'; Olivia Wingate 20' | Report | | Stadium: Alumni Stadium; Attendance: 478; Referee: Nicole Green; Assistant referees: Andrew Bigelow; Christian Little; Fourth official: Christopher Koloffon |

===== Quarterfinals =====
| November 26 | #4 Notre Dame | 0–2 | #2 North Carolina | Notre Dame, IN |
| 6:00 p.m. EST | Laney Matriano (yellow card) 56'; Brianna Martinez (yellow card) 80' | Report | 22' Ally Sentnor; 47', (yellow card) 84' Talia DellaPeruta; (yellow card) 89' Maddie Dahlien | Stadium: Alumni Stadium; Attendance: 1,828; Referee: Dimitar Chavdarov; Assistant referees: Maggie Short; Jason White; Fourth official: Nikola Aleksic |

Rankings from United Soccer Coaches Final Regular Season Rankings

=== UCLA Bracket ===
First round Campus Sites
2 | Penn State* | 4
Quinnipiac | 1
Virginia Tech | 0
7 | West Virginia* | 2
6 | Tennessee* | 1
Xavier (a.e.t.) | 4
Fairleigh Dickinson | 0
3 | Virginia* | 4
4 | Northwestern* | 3
SIU Edwardsville | 0
Vanderbilt | 1
5 | Clemson* | 0
8 | NC State* | 1 (2)
UCF (pen.) | 1 (4)
Northern Arizona | 1
1 | UCLA* | 4

Second round Regional Campus Sites
2 | Penn State* | 4
7 | West Virginia | 0
Xavier | 1
3 | Virginia | 3
4 | Northwestern | 2
Vanderbilt | 1
UCF | 1 (0)
1 | UCLA (pen.)* | 1 (3)

Round of 16; Regional Campus Sites
2 | Penn State | 2
3 | Virginia (a.e.t.) | 3
4 | Northwestern | 0
1 | UCLA | 2

Quarterfinal; Campus Sites
3 | Virginia | 1
1 | UCLA (a.e.t.) | 2

* Host institution

==== Schedule ====
===== First round =====
| November 11 | #25 Clemson | 0–1 | Vanderbilt | Clemson, SC |
| 3:00 p.m. EST | Hal Hershfelt (yellow card) 72' | Report | 61' Peyton Cutshall | Stadium: Riggs Field; Attendance: 312; Referee: Carmen Serbio; Assistant referees: Benjamin Oakley; Jude Carr; Fourth official: Derek Ambrozaitis |

| November 11 | #22 Tennessee | 1–4 (a.e.t.) | Xavier | Knoxville, TN |
| 6:00 p.m. EST | Jaida Thomas 20' | Report | 36' Ella Rogers; (yellow card) 73' Natalie Bain; 94' Chole Netzel; 103' Molly McLaughlin; 110' Sonia Vargas | Stadium: Regal Stadium; Attendance: 478; Referee: Amin Hadzic; Assistant referees: Thomas Brigman; Shannon O'Carroll; Fourth official: Kiah Haslett |

| November 11 | #1 UCLA | 4–1 | Northern Arizona | Los Angeles, CA |
| 9:00 p.m. EST | Lexi Wright 1', 9'; Emma Egizii 40'; Sunshine Fontes 85' | Report | 87' Randalyn Hunter | Stadium: Wallis Annenberg Stadium; Attendance: 1,350; Referee: Samantha Martinez; Assistant referees: Salvador Reyes; Haily Morejon; Fourth official: Steve Elliott |

| November 12 | #12 Northwestern | 3–0 | SIU Edwardsville | Evanston, IL |
| 2:00 p.m. EST | Meg Boade 38'; Josie Aulicino 44'; Ingrid Falls 76' | Report | (yellow card) 24' Mary Fetter; (yellow card) 76' Kaitlyn Nichols | Stadium: Martin Stadium; Attendance: 530; Referee: Alex Beehler; Assistant referees: Donald Williams; Chad Hohenbery; Fourth official: Jean Lyons |

| November 12 | #11 Virginia | 4–0 | Fairleigh Dickinson | Charlottesville, VA |
| 6:00 p.m. EST | Haley Hopkins 7'; Chloe Japic (yellow card) 36'; Maggie Cagle (yellow card) 50'; Alexa Spaanstra 60' (pen.); Talia Staude 83'; Meredith McDermott 84'; Tatum Galvin (yellow card) 85' | Report | (yellow card) 58' (yellow-red card) 71' Paula Ruess; (yellow card) 83' Team | Stadium: Klöckner Stadium; Attendance: 1,118; Referee: Nick Fateh; Assistant referees: William Aten; Jeffrey Skinker; Fourth official: Brendan Orino |

| November 13 | NC State | 1–1 (a.e.t.) (2–4 p) | #20 UCF | Raleigh, NC |
| 12:00 p.m. EST | Annika Wohner 53' (pen.); Jaiden Thomas (yellow card) 108' | Report | 72' (pen.) Darya Rajaee; (yellow card) 107' Maggie Jenkins | Stadium: Dail Soccer Field; Attendance: 423; Referee: JC Griggs; Assistant referees: Nicholas Seymour; Aaron Hormuth; Fourth official: Thomas Rutherford |
| | Penalties |
| | Lulu Guttenberger (penalty scored); Jenna Butler (penalty scored); Mia Vaughan (penalty missed); Maria Echezarreta (penalty missed) | | (penalty missed) Ariel Young; (penalty scored) Maggie Jenkins; (penalty scored) Sanja Homann; (penalty scored) Kristen Scott; (penalty scored) Darya Rajaee |

| November 13 | #21 Penn State | 4–1 | Quinnipiac | University Park, PA |
| 1:00 p.m. EST | Kate Wiesner 23'; Payton Linnehan 50'; Penelope Hocking (yellow card) 62', (goal) 65'; Cori Dyke (yellow card) 72', (goal) 77'; Team (yellow card) 72' | Report | (yellow card) 29' Rebecca Cooke; (yellow card) 45' Emily DeNunzio; 46' Markela Bejleri | Stadium: Jeffrey Field; Attendance: 1,596; Referee: Mike DeFelice; Assistant referees: Luis Arroyo; Larry Urwiler; Fourth official: Ross Kleinstuber |

| November 13 | West Virginia | 2–0 | Virginia Tech | Morgantown, WV |
| 1:00 p.m. EST | Aria Bilal 49'; Isabel Loza 81'; Dilary Heredia-Beltrán (yellow card) 85' | Report | (yellow card) 15' Lauren Gogal; (yellow card) 89' Tori Powell | Stadium: Dick Dlesk Soccer Stadium; Attendance: 1,221; Referee: Joshua Encarnacion; Assistant referees: Ali Zolgharnain; Dustin Killick; Fourth official: Saki Atsas |

===== Second round =====
| November 18 | #11 Virginia | 3–1 | Xavier | University Park, PA |
| 2:00 p.m. EST | Lia Godfrey 6', 20'; Maggie Cagle 72' | Report | 22' Ella Rogers; (yellow card) 80' Maddie Reed | Stadium: Jeffrey Field; Attendance: 261 |

| November 18 | #21 Penn State | 4–0 | West Virginia | University Park, PA |
| 4:30 p.m. EST | Payton Linnehan 1'; Penelope Hocking 56'; Cori Dyke 57' (pen.); Amelia White 69' | Report | | Stadium: Jeffrey Field; Attendance: 476 |

| November 18 | #12 Northwestern | 2–1 | Vanderbilt | Los Angeles, CA |
| 7:00 p.m. EST | Josie Aulicino 54'; Bridget Mitchell 81'; Team (yellow card) 86' | Report | (yellow card) 74' Ella Shamburger; 83' (pen.) Ella Shamburger | Stadium: Wallis Annenberg Stadium; Attendance: 1,487; Referee: Adrian Gonzalez; Assistant referees: Andie Reyes; Haily Morejon; Fourth official: Reyna Fonseca |

| November 18 | #1 UCLA | 1–1 (a.e.t.) (3–0 p) | #20 UCF | Los Angeles, CA |
| 10:00 p.m. EST | Jackie Gilday 38'; Bridgette Marin-Valencia (yellow card) 78' | Report | 35', (yellow card) 40' Dayana Martin | Stadium: Wallis Annenberg Stadium; Attendance: 1,487; Referee: Karen Callado; Assistant referees: Kristin Patterson; Ana Valdez; Fourth official: Reyna Fonseca |
| | Penalties |
| | Jayden Perry (penalty scored); Sunshine Fontes (penalty scored); Lilly Reale (penalty scored) | | (penalty missed) Katie Bradley; (penalty missed) Maggie Jenkins; (penalty missed) Sanja Homann |

===== Round of 16 =====
| November 20 | #21 Penn State | 2–3 (a.e.t.) | #11 Virginia | University Park, PA |
| 5:00 p.m. EST | Payton Linnehan 30'; Amelia White 82'; Kate Wiesner (yellow card) 97' | Report | 74' Jill Flammia; 88' Maya Carter; 94' Haley Hopkins | Stadium: Jeffrey Field; Attendance: 474; Referee: Lucas Feathers; Assistant referees: Jordan Gray; Hector Rueda; Fourth official: Gregg Day |

| November 20 | #1 UCLA | 2–0 | #12 Northwestern | Los Angeles, CA |
| 9:00 p.m. EST | Madelyn Desiano 6'; Ally Cook (yellow card) 56'; Bridgette Marin-Valencia (yellow card) 60'; Quincy McMahon 65' | Report | | Stadium: Wallis Annenberg Stadium; Attendance: 1,709; Referee: Frank Anderson; Assistant referees: Salma Perez; Morgan Abbitt; Fourth official: Trevor Wiseman |

===== Quarterfinals =====
| November 26, 2022 | #1 UCLA | 2–1 (a.e.t.) | #11 Virginia | Los Angeles, CA |
| 9:00 p.m. EST | Sunshine Fontes 15'; Sofia Cook 98' | Report | 75' Haley Hopkins | Stadium: Wallis Annenberg Stadium; Attendance: 2,419; Referee: Randy Hoffman; Assistant referees: Andie Reyes; Melissa Gonzalez; Fourth official: Daniel Radford |

Rankings from United Soccer Coaches Final Regular Season Rankings

=== Alabama Bracket ===
First round Campus Sites
1 | Alabama* | 9
Jackson State | 0
Arizona State | 0
8 | Portland* | 3
5 | Rutgers* | 0
Brown | 1
UC Irvine | 2
4 | USC* | 0
3 | South Carolina* | 2
Wake Forest | 0
New Hampshire | 0
6 | Harvard* | 2
7 | Texas* | 3
Texas A&M | 1
Radford | 0
2 | Duke* | 4

Second round Regional Campus Sites
1 | Alabama* | 2
8 | Portland | 1
Brown | 1 (2)
UC Irvine (pen.) | 1 (4)
3 | South Carolina | 3
6 | Harvard | 2
7 | Texas | 0
2 | Duke* | 1

Round of 16; Regional Campus Sites
1 | Alabama | 3
UC Irvine | 1
3 | South Carolina | 1
2 | Duke | 2

Quarterfinal; Campus Sites
1 | Alabama (a.e.t.) | 3
2 | Duke | 2

* Host institution

==== Schedule ====
===== First round =====
| November 11 | #16 Texas | 3–1 | Texas A&M | Austin, TX |
| 6:00 p.m. EST | Jilly Shimkin 12'; Emma Regan (yellow card) 61'; Trinity Byars 65'; Holly Ward (yellow card) 78'; Ashlyn Miller 79' | Report | (yellow card) 12' Katie Smith; 58' (pen.) Maile Hayes | Stadium: Myers Stadium; Attendance: 1,645; Referee: Brandon Gardner; Assistant referees: Santiago Roa; Muhammad Kaleia; Fourth official: Shawn Mire |

| November 11 | #3 Alabama | 9–0 | Jackson State | Tuscaloosa, AL |
| 7:00 p.m. EST | Riley Mattingly Parker 15', 51'; Ashlynn Serepca 16'; Kat Rogers 24'; Felicia Knox 53'; Reyna Reyes 59'; Gianna Paul 60'; Aislin Streicek 66'; Emelie Kobler 83' | Report | | Stadium: Alabama Soccer Stadium; Attendance: 1,306; Referee: Wes Cauette; Assistant referees: Ryan Starr; Ron Ware; Fourth official: Andrew Musashe |

| November 12 | #14 USC | 0–2 | UC Irvine | Los Angeles, CA |
| 4:00 p.m. EST | Nicole Payne (yellow card) 53' | Report | 16' Destinee Manzo; 88' Alyssa Moore | Stadium: McAlister Field; Attendance: 722; Referee: Karen Callado; Assistant referees: Andie Reyes; Kristin Patterson; Fourth official: Haily Morejon |

| November 12 | Harvard | 2–0 | New Hampshire | Boston, MA |
| 5:00 p.m. EST | Jordan Di Verniero 9'; Hollyn Torres 34' | Report | | Stadium: Jordan Field; Attendance: 1,008 |

| November 12 | #24 Rutgers | 0–1 | Brown | Piscataway, NJ |
| 6:00 p.m. EST | Adriana Kuryla (yellow card) 51' | Report | 81' Ava Seelenfreund; (yellow card) 89' Gianna De Priest | Stadium: Yurcak Field; Attendance: 1,688; Referee: Alla Stepanov; Assistant referees: Sharon Gingrich; Matthew Richardson; Fourth official: Keith Collins |

| November 12 | #13 South Carolina | 2–0 | Wake Forest | Columbia, SC |
| 6:00 p.m. EST | Jyllissa Harris 19'; Catherine Barry 65' | Report | (yellow card) 44' Alex Wood | Stadium: Stone Stadium; Attendance: 1,670; Referee: Nicole Green; Assistant referees: Zachar McWhorter; Kayla Polonsky; Fourth official: Doug Hartemann |

| November 12 | #8 Duke | 4–0 | Radford | Durham, NC |
| 7:00 p.m. EST | Kat Rader 26'; Michelle Cooper 33', 65'; Elle Piper 51' | Report | (yellow card) 74' Alexeis Kirnos | Stadium: Koskinen Stadium; Attendance: 785; Referee: Hicham El Bariqi; Assistant referees: Eric Barnes; Hudson Owens; Fourth official: Thomas Rutherford |

| November 12 | Portland | 3–0 | Arizona State | Portland, OR |
| 10:00 p.m. EST | Ruby Settle 57'; Nedya Sawan 75'; Selma Licina 78' | Report | (yellow card) 66' Lucy Johnson | Stadium: Merlo Field; Attendance: 1,534; Referee: Jaclyn Metz; Assistant referees: Raymond Moffatte Jr. CJ Kill; Fourth official: Chris Wilgus |

===== Second round =====
| November 18 | #13 South Carolina | 3–2 | Harvard | Durham, NC |
| 4:00 p.m. EST | Own Goal 3' (o.g.); Catherine Barry 22', 41'; Gracie Falla (yellow card) 48' | Report | 81' (o.g.) Own Goal; 88' Jordan Di Verniero | Stadium: Koskinen Stadium; Attendance: 760; Referee: Meghan Mullen; Assistant referees: Bill Dittmar; Duane Paquette; Fourth official: William Steffen |

| November 18 | UC Irvine | 1–1 (a.e.t.) (4–2 p) | Brown | Tuscaloosa, AL |
| 4:00 p.m. EST | Alyssa Moore 45'; Glo Hinojosa (yellow card) 67'; Alex Jaquez (yellow card) 103' | Report | (yellow card) 40' Lucinda Anderson; (yellow card) 64' Sheyenne Allen; 67' (pen.), (yellow card) 91' Brittany Raphino | Stadium: Alabama Soccer Stadium; Attendance: 1,191; Referee: Benjamin Meyer; Assistant referees: Joshua Belk; Celeste Roberts; Fourth official: Donovan Eubank |
| | Penalties |
| | Tati Fung (penalty scored); Aislynn Crowder (penalty scored); Erin Covey (penalty scored); Emilie Castagna (penalty scored) | | (penalty missed) Ava Seelenfreund; (penalty missed) Brittany Raphino; (penalty scored) Courtney Cummings; (penalty scored) Kira Maguire |

| November 18 | #8 Duke | 1–0 | #16 Texas | Durham, NC |
| 6:30 p.m. EST | Devin Lynch (yellow card) 69'; Katie Groff 88' | Report | (yellow card) 21' Ashlyn Miller | Stadium: Koskinen Stadium; Attendance: 760; Referee: Dimitar Chavdarov; Assistant referees: Jude Carr; Robert Dail; Fourth official: Charles Raney |

| November 18 | #3 Alabama | 2–1 | Portland | Tuscaloosa, AL |
| 7:00 p.m. EST | Reyna Reyes (yellow card) 32'; McKinley Crone (yellow card) 61'; Riley Mattingly Parker 67'; Sasha Pickard (yellow card) 69'; Own Goal 75' (o.g.) | Report | 69' (pen.) Cally Togiai | Stadium: Alabama Soccer Stadium; Attendance: 1,191; Referee: Matthew Thompson; Assistant referees: Melinda Sopka; Logan Reeves; Fourth official: Kiah Haslett |

===== Round of 16 =====
| November 20 | #3 Alabama | 3–1 | UC Irvine | Tuscaloosa, AL |
| 2:00 p.m. EST | Macy Clem 56'; Ashlynn Serepca 60'; Riley Tanner (yellow card) 79'; Felicia Knox 88' (pen.) | Report | (yellow card) 57' Destinee Manzo; 66', (yellow card) 72' Suus de Bakker | Stadium: Alabama Soccer Stadium; Attendance: 879; Referee: Amin Hadzic; Assistant referees: Sam Bilbo; Austin Holt; Fourth official: Nicole Steiner |

| November 20 | #8 Duke | 2–1 | #13 South Carolina | Durham, NC |
| 6:00 p.m. EST | Michelle Cooper 12', 84'; Emily Royson (yellow card) 61' | Report | 89' Payton Patrick | Stadium: Koskinen Stadium; Attendance: 756; Referee: Tori Penso; Assistant referees: Taylor Bombalski; Justin Howard; Fourth official: Richard Crowgey |

===== Quarterfinals =====
| November 25 | #3 Alabama | 3–2 (a.e.t.) | #8 Duke | Tuscaloosa, AL |
| 7:00 p.m. EST | Sasha Pickard (yellow card) 31'; Gianna Paul 68', (yellow card) 85'; Ashlynn Serepca 72'; Reyna Reyes 98'; Kat Rogers (yellow card) 107' | Report | (yellow card) 7' Sophie Jones; (yellow card) 19' Delaney Graham; 76', 79' Michelle Cooper; (yellow card) 86' Elle Piper | Stadium: Alabama Soccer Stadium; Attendance: 1,790; Referee: Alyssa Nichols; Assistant referees: Jarred Mosher; Kevin Huet; Fourth official: Laith Dahhan |

Rankings from United Soccer Coaches Final Regular Season Rankings

=== College Cup ===
Semifinals; December 2 WakeMed Soccer Park; Cary, North Carolina
1 | Florida State | 2
2 | North Carolina | 3
1 | Alabama | 0
1 | UCLA | 3

Final; December 5 WakeMed Soccer Park; Cary, North Carolina
2 | North Carolina | 2
1 | UCLA (a.e.t.) | 3

==== Schedule ====
===== Semifinals =====
| December 2, 2022 | #5 Florida State | 2–3 | #2 North Carolina | Cary, NC |
| 6:00 p.m. EST | Heather Gilchrist (yellow card) 59'; Onyi Echegini 67'; Heather Payne 76' | Report | 42' Aleigh Gambone; (yellow card) 57' Emerson Elgin; 59' (pen.) Tori Hansen; 65' Julia Dorsey; (yellow card) 73' Maggie Pierce | Stadium: WakeMed Soccer Park; Attendance: 10,000; Referee: Corey Rockwell; Assistant referees: Jarred Mosher; Kate Wasiak; Fourth official: Bill Dittmar |

| December 2, 2022 | #3 Alabama | 0–3 | #1 UCLA | Cary, NC |
| 8:30 p.m. EST | Gianna Paul (yellow card) 35'; Sydney Japic (yellow card) 75' | Report | 30' Reilyn Turner; 52' Quincy McMahon; 54', (yellow card) 62' Madelyn Desiano | Stadium: WakeMed Soccer Park; Attendance: 10,000; Referee: Mark Kadlecik; Assistant referees: Tiffini Turpen; Patricia McCracken; Fourth official: Bill Dittmar |

===== Final =====
| December 5, 2022 | #2 North Carolina | 2–3 (a.e.t.) | #1 UCLA | Cary, NC |
| 6:00 p.m. EST | Avery Patterson 59', 75'; Isabel Cox (yellow card) 70'; Tori DellaPeruta (yellow card) 74'; Maggie Pierce (yellow card) 90' | Report | (yellow card) 34' Jayden Perry; (yellow card) 77' Bridgette Marin-Valencia; 80' Lexi Wright; 89' Reilyn Turner; 107' Maricarmen Reyes | Stadium: WakeMed Soccer Park; Attendance: 9,531; Referee: Samantha Martinez; Assistant referees: Kate Wasiak; Tiffini Turpin; Fourth official: Mark Kadlecik |

Rankings from United Soccer Coaches Final Regular Season Rankings

== Record by conference ==
| Conference | Bids | Record | Pct. | R32 | R16 | E8 | F4 | CG | NC |
|---|---|---|---|---|---|---|---|---|---|
| ACC | 10 | 20–9–1 | .683 | 6 | 6 | 5 | 2 | 1 | – |
| Pac-12 | 5 | 6–3–2 | .636 | 2 | 1 | 1 | 1 | 1 | 1 |
| SEC | 9 | 12–9–1 | .568 | 7 | 3 | 2 | 1 | – | – |
| Big Ten | 5 | 6–5 | .545 | 4 | 2 | 1 | – | – | – |
| Big West | 1 | 1–1–1 | .500 | 1 | 1 | – | – | – | – |
| American | 2 | 2–0–3 | .700 | 2 | 1 | – | – | – | – |
| WCC | 3 | 3–3–1 | .500 | 3 | 1 | – | – | – | – |
| Big 12 | 3 | 4–3 | .571 | 3 | – | – | – | – | – |
| Big East | 2 | 2–2 | .500 | 2 | – | – | – | – | – |
| Ivy | 2 | 2–1–1 | .625 | 2 | – | – | – | – | – |
| WAC | 2 | 0–2 | .000 | – | – | – | – | – | – |
| Other | 20 | 0–20 | .000 | – | – | – | – | – | – |

- The R32, S16, E8, F4, CG, and NC columns indicate how many teams from each conference were in the Round of 32 (second round), Round of 16 (third round), Quarterfinals (Elite Eight), Semifinals (Final Four), Championship Game, and National Champion, respectively.
- The following conferences failed to place a team into the round of 32: Atlantic 10, America East, ASUN, Big Sky, Big South, CAA, C-USA, Horizon, MAAC, MAC, Missouri Valley, Mountain West, Northeast, Ohio Valley, Patriot, SoCon, Southland, Summit League, Sun Belt, and SWAC. These conference's records have been consolidated in the "Other" row.

== Statistics ==
=== Goalscorers ===
There were 213 goals scored in 63 matches, for an average of 3.38 goals per match.

6 goals

- (Canada) Jessica De Filippo – Arkansas
- (United States) Michelle Cooper – Duke

5 goals

- (United States) Ally Sentnor – North Carolina
- (United States) Jasmine Aikey – Stanford

3 goals

- (United States) Riley Mattingly Parker – Alabama
- (United States) Ashlynn Serepca – Alabama
- (United States) Maddie Dahlien – North Carolina
- (United States) Talia DellaPeruta – North Carolina
- (United States) Avery Patterson – North Carolina
- (United States) Korbin Albert – Notre Dame
- (United States) Olivia Wingate – Notre Dame
- (United States) Payton Linnehan – Penn State
- (United States) Catherine Barry – South Carolina
- (United States) Lexi Wright – UCLA
- (United States) Haley Hopkins – Virginia

2 goals

- (United States) Felicia Knox – Alabama
- (United States) Gianna Paul – Alabama
- (Mexico) Reyna Reyes – Alabama
- (United States) Bea Franklin – Arkansas
- (United States) Ava Tankersley – Arkansas
- (United States) Allie Fryer – BYU
- (United States) Olivia Wade – BYU
- (Nigeria) Onyi Echegini – Florida State
- (Bermuda) Leilanni Nesbeth – Florida State
- (United States) Jordan Di Verniero – Harvard
- (Canada) Mya Jones – Memphis
- (Canada) Saorla Miller – Memphis
- (United States) Josie Aulicino – Northwestern
- (United States) Maddie Mercado – Notre Dame
- (Jamaica) Peyton McNamara – Ohio State
- (United States) Cori Dyke – Penn State
- (United States) Penelope Hocking – Penn State
- (United States) Amelia White – Penn State
- (United States) Camryn Lancaster – TCU
- (United States) Alyssa Moore – UC Irvine
- (United States) Madelyn Desiano – UCLA
- (United States) Sunshine Fontes – UCLA
- (United States) Quincy McMahon – UCLA
- (United States) Reilyn Turner – UCLA
- (United States) Lia Godfrey – Virginia
- (United States) Ella Rogers – Xavier

1 goal

- (United States) Macy Clem – Alabama
- (Austria) Emelie Kobler – Alabama
- (United States) Kat Rogers – Alabama
- (Canada) Aislin Streicek – Alabama
- (United States) Anna Podojil – Arkansas
- (United States) Ellie Podojil – Arkansas
- (United States) Zoe Susi – Arkansas
- (United States) Mia Wehby – Arkansas
- (Haiti) Brittany Raphino – Brown
- (United States) Ava Seelenfreund – Brown
- (United States) Rachel McCarthy – BYU
- (United States) Tara Warner – BYU
- (United States) Katie Groff – Duke
- (United States) Elle Piper – Duke
- (United States) Kat Rader – Duke
- (Jamaica) Jody Brown – Florida State
- (United States) Lauren Flynn – Florida State
- (United States) Amelia Horton – Florida State
- (Japan) Ran Iwai – Florida State
- (United States) Jenna Nighswonger – Florida State
- (Sweden) Beata Olsson – Florida State
- (Republic of Ireland) Heather Payne – Florida State
- (United States) Kaitlyn Zipay – Florida State
- (United States) Erika Harwood – Georgetown
- (United States) Claire Manning – Georgetown
- (United States) Jessie Dunn – Georgia
- (United States) Madison Haugen – Georgia
- (United States) Dani Murguia – Georgia
- (United States) Hollyn Torres – Harvard
- (Kenya) Christine Kitaru – Lamar
- (Ghana) Wasila Diwura-Soale – LSU
- (Iceland) Ída Marín Hermannsdóttir – LSU
- (England) Brenna McPartlan – LSU
- (United States) Mollee Swift – LSU
- (United States) Jocelyn Alonzo – Memphis
- (Germany) Lilly Huber – Memphis
- (Canada) Grace Stordy – Memphis
- (Canada) Anne-Valerie Seto – Memphis
- (United States) Camryn Evans – Michigan State
- (United States) Celia Gaynor – Michigan State
- (United States) Justina Gaynor – Michigan State
- (United States) Natalie Auble – Milwaukee
- (United States) Kayla Rollins – Milwaukee
- (United States) Alivia Buxton – Mississippi State
- (United States) Rylie Combs – Mississippi State
- (United States) Loma McNeese – New Mexico State
- (Germany) Annika Wohner – NC State
- (United States) Julia Dorsey – North Carolina
- (United States) Aleigh Gambone – North Carolina
- (United States) Tori Hansen – North Carolina
- (United States) Lauren Wrigley – North Carolina
- (United States) Randalyn Hunter – Northern Arizona
- (United States) Meg Boade – Northwestern
- (United States) Ingrid Falls – Northwestern
- (United States) Bridget Mitchell – Northwestern
- (United States) Laney Matriano – Notre Dame
- (United States) Paige Peltier – Notre Dame
- (Jamaica) Kiki Van Zanten – Notre Dame
- (United States) Emma Sears – Ohio State
- (United States) Kate Wiesner – Penn State
- (Canada) Leah Pais – Pittsburgh
- (United States) Sarah Schupansky – Pittsburgh
- (United States) Katie Zailski – Pittsburgh
- (Germany) Selma Licina – Portland
- (United States) Ruby Settle – Portland
- (Egypt) Nedya Sawan – Portland
- (United States) Cally Togiai – Portland
- (Albania) Markela Bejleri – Quinnipiac
- (United States) Izzy D'Aquila – Santa Clara
- (United States) Jyllissa Harris – South Carolina
- (United States) Payton Patrick – South Carolina
- (United States) Maya Doms – Stanford
- (United States) Logan Smith – Stanford
- (United States) Brenna Brosam – TCU
- (United States) Jaida Thomas – Tennessee
- (United States) Trinity Byars – Texas
- (United States) Ashlyn Miller – Texas
- (United States) Jilly Shimkin – Texas
- (United States) Maile Hayes – Texas A&M
- (Netherlands) Suus de Bakker – UC Irvine
- (United States) Destinee Manzo – UC Irvine
- (United States) Dayana Martin – UCF
- (United States) Darya Rajaee – UCF
- (United States) Sofia Cook – UCLA
- (United States) Emma Egizii – UCLA
- (Nicaragua) Jackie Gilday – UCLA
- (Mexico) Maricarmen Reyes – UCLA
- (United States) Sasjah Dade – UTSA
- (United States) Peyton Cutshall – Vanderbilt
- (United States) Ella Shamburger – Vanderbilt
- (United States) Maggie Cagle – Virginia
- (United States) Maya Carter – Virginia
- (United States) Jill Flammia – Virginia
- (United States) Meredith McDermott – Virginia
- (United States) Alexa Spaanstra – Virginia
- (United States) Talia Staude – Virginia
- (United States) Aria Bilal – West Virginia
- (United States) Isabel Loza – West Virginia
- (United States) Molly McLaughlin – Xavier
- (United States) Chloe Netzel – Xavier
- (United States) Sonia Vargas – Xavier

1 own goal

- Arkansas (against Florida State)
- Harvard (against South Carolina)
- Portland (against Alabama)
- South Carolina (against Harvard)
- UTSA (against TCU)

== See also ==
- 2022 NCAA Division I men's soccer tournament
