= Sarah Schupansky =

American soccer player (born 2003)

- Schupansky with the Boston Legacy in 2026

Personal information
- Full name: Sarah Caitlin Schupansky
- Date of birth: August 25, 2003 (age 23)
- Place of birth: Pittsburgh, Pennsylvania, U.S.
- Height: 5 ft 5 in (1.65 m)
- Positions: Midfielder; forward

Team information
- Current team: Boston Legacy
- Number: 23

Youth career
- 2015–2020: Riverhounds Academy

College career
Years	Team	Apps	(Gls)
2021–2024	Pittsburgh Panthers	82	(32)

Senior career*
Years	Team	Apps	(Gls)
2024	Racing Louisville (USL W)	7	(5)
2025–2026	Gotham FC	38	(1)
2026–	Boston Legacy	9	(0)

International career^{‡}
2025–	United States U23	5	(0)
- * Club domestic league appearances and goals as of 02:17, November 8, 2026 (UTC) ‡ National team caps and goals as of 14:14, March 8, 2026 (UTC)

Sarah Caitlin Schupansky (born August 25, 2003) is an American professional soccer player who plays as an attacking midfielder for Boston Legacy FC of the National Women's Soccer League (NWSL). She played college soccer for the Pittsburgh Panthers, earning first-team All-ACC honors. She began her professional career with Gotham FC in 2025, winning the NWSL Championship in her rookie season.

== Early life ==
Schupansky was raised in Pittsburgh, Pennsylvania, one of three daughters born to Robert and Susan Schupansky. She began playing rec soccer at an early age, where she was coached by her father, before joining the Riverhounds Development Academy at age 12. She grew up as a fan of Alex Morgan, Rose Lavelle, and Crystal Dunn. She played high school soccer at North Allegheny High School, leading the team to consecutive WPIAL 4A championships (2019 and 2020). She was twice named all-state and was a United Soccer Coaches high school All-American in 2020. She committed to play college soccer for the local Pittsburgh Panthers during her freshman year, becoming one of the first players signed by new head coach Randy Waldrum.

== College career ==
Schupansky enrolled early at the University of Pittsburgh in the spring of 2021. She scored her first college goal with the overtime winner against Oklahoma State. She finished her freshman season with 7 goals and 6 assists in 18 appearances. She scored 7 goals and led the team with 8 assists in 22 games as a sophomore in 2022. Her contributions helped Pittsburgh make their first NCAA tournament appearance in program history, reaching the round of sixteen with Schupansky scoring against Georgetown in the second round.

Showing versatility at forward and midfielder, Schupansky had a stellar junior season in 2023, recording 11 goals and 14 assists in 24 games. She helped the Panthers to program firsts: reaching the ACC tournament semifinals and the NCAA tournament quarterfinals (losing to Florida State at both hurdles). She also became the first player in program history to earn first-team All-ACC honors. The following summer, she played for USL W League side Racing Louisville FC. In her senior year in 2024, she was a second-team All-ACC pick after scoring 7 goals and leading the nation with 15 assists in 18 games, though the Panthers narrowly missed selection to the NCAA tournament.

== Club career ==
=== Gotham FC ===
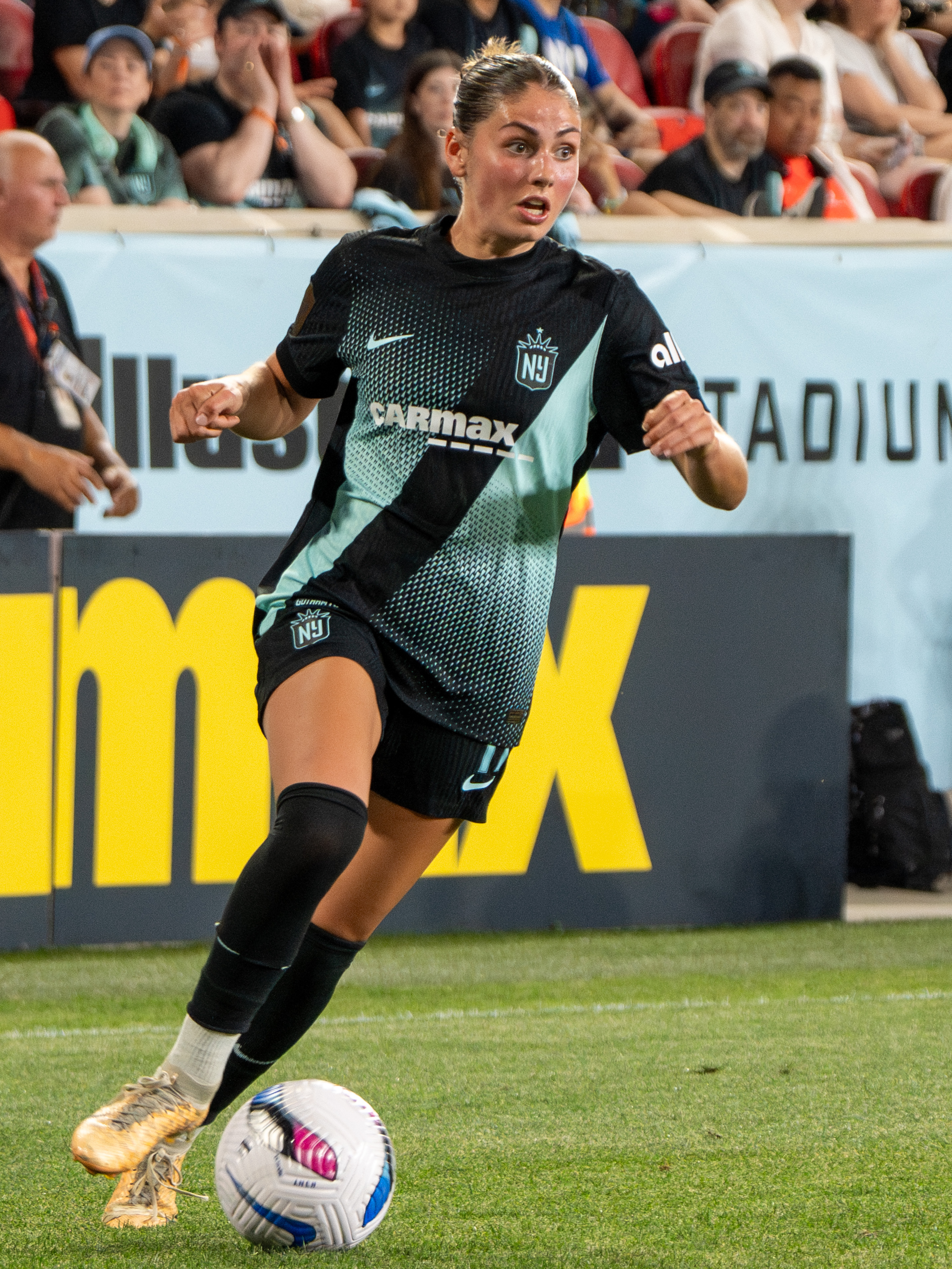
Schupansky playing for Gotham in 2025

Gotham FC announced on December 23, 2024, that they had signed Schupansky to her first professional contract on a two-year deal with the team option to extend another year. She made her professional debut in the season opener against the Seattle Reign, starting and being named player of the match after the 1–1 draw on March 15, 2025. On April 19, she registered her first professional assist to Esther in a 4–0 win over Angel City FC. The following week, she scored her first professional goal and assisted Esther again as Gotham won 3–0 against the Washington Spirit. On May 24, she started in the CONCACAF W Champions Cup final against Tigres, helping Gotham win 1–0 to become the inaugural winners of the competition.

On September 15, 2025, Schupansky signed a contract extension with Gotham through 2027. She finished her rookie season with 1 goal and 5 assists in 23 regular-season appearances, ranking tied for second in the league in assists. She made her playoff debut in the quarterfinals, helping eighth-seeded Gotham win 2–1 against NWSL Shield winners Kansas City Current. In the NWSL Championship against the Washington Spirit, she played a long ball to Bruninha to set up Rose Lavelle's goal in the 1–0 victory. During a year and a half with Gotham, she made 49 appearances and scored 1 goal in all competitions, collecting three trophies.

=== Boston Legacy ===
On August 21, 2026, Schupansky was traded to the Boston Legacy for US$50,000 in allocation funds and US$30,000 in intraleague transfer funds.

== International career ==
Schupansky was called into training camp with the United States under-23 team, practicing concurrently with the senior national team, in March 2025.

== Honors and awards ==
Gotham FC

- NWSL Championship: 2025
- NWSL Challenge Cup: 2026
- CONCACAF W Champions Cup: 2024–25

Individual

- First-team All-ACC: 2023
- Second-team All-ACC: 2024
- NCAA Division I assists leader: 2024
