= Maricarmen Reyes =

Mexican footballer (born 2000)

Personal information
- Full name: Maricarmen Reyes Zárate
- Date of birth: 23 April 2000 (age 26)
- Place of birth: Fountain Valley, California, U.S.
- Height: 1.70 m (5 ft 7 in)
- Position: Attacking midfielder

Team information
- Current team: UANL
- Number: 24

Youth career
- –2018: West Coast Academy

College career
Years	Team	Apps	(Gls)
2018–2022	UCLA Bruins	71	(15)

Senior career*
Years	Team	Apps	(Gls)
2019	LA Galaxy OC		
2023–	UANL	56	(28)

International career^{‡}
2015–2016	Mexico U-17	5	(1)
2018–2020	Mexico U-20	15	(1)
2021–	Mexico	15	(8)
- * Club domestic league appearances and goals as of 2 September 2025 ‡ National team caps and goals as of 13 October 2026

Maricarmen Reyes Zárate (born 23 April 2000) is a footballer who plays as a midfielder for Liga MX Femenil club Tigres UANL. Born and raised in the United States to Mexican parents, she represents Mexico internationally.

== Early life ==
Reyes was born in Fountain Valley, California and raised in Santa Ana, California to Mexican parents, who hailed from Zamora, Michoacán.

== College career ==
Reyes played 71 games in five seasons with the UCLA Bruins. She scored the game-winning goal in overtime of the championship game of the 2022 NCAA Division I women's soccer tournament, giving the Bruins their second national championship in program history.

== International career ==
On 21 September 2021, Reyes scored her first goal for the Mexico national team in a 2–0 victory over Colombia at Estadio Azteca.

== Personal life ==
Reyes' brother Oscar, a footballer as well, also played for the UCLA Bruins. Unlike her, her brother was born in Mexico and has represented the United States (at under-17 level).

== Career statistics ==
=== International ===
As of match played 13 October 2026

Appearances and goals by national team and year
National team	Year	Apps	Goals
Mexico	2021	2	1
Mexico	2022	6	5
Mexico	2024	5	1
Mexico	2026	2	1
Total		15	8

Scores and results list Mexico's goal tally first, score column indicates score after each Mexico goal.

List of international goals scored by Maricarmen Reyes
No.	Date	Venue	Opponent	Score	Result	Competition
1.	21 September 2021	Estadio Azteca, Mexico City, Mexico	Colombia	1–0	2–0	Friendly
2.	17 February 2022	Estadio Universitario, San Nicolás de los Garza, Mexico	Suriname	6–0	9–0	2022 CONCACAF W Championship qualification
3.	20 February 2022	Estadio Olímpico Félix Sánchez, Santo Domingo, Dominican Republic	Antigua and Barbuda	6–0	8–0	2022 CONCACAF W Championship qualification
4.	9 April 2022	Raymond E. Guishard Technical Centre, The Valley, Anguilla	Anguilla	3–0	11–0	2022 CONCACAF W Championship qualification
5.	25 June 2022	Estadio TSM, Torreón, Mexico	Peru	5–1	5–1	Friendly
6.	28 June 2022	Cancha de Entrenamiento TSM, Torreón, Mexico	Peru	1–0	3–0	Friendly
7.	29 October 2024	Estadio Nemesio Diez, Toluca, Mexico	Thailand	3–0	4–0	Friendly
8.	13 October 2026	Estadio Corregidora, Querétaro, Mexico	Jamaica	2–0	3–1	Friendly

== Honours ==
UCLA Bruins

- NCAA Division I women's soccer tournament: 2022

Tigres UANL

- Campeón de Campeonas: 2024

== Individual ==
- Liga MX Golden Boot: 2023 Apertura
