= Jené Baclawski =

American soccer manager

Personal information
- Date of birth: 1976 or 1977 (age 49–50)

College career
Years	Team	Apps	(Gls)
1995–1997	Queens Royals		

Managerial career
- 2008–2014: Southwestern Pirates
- 2019–: Saint Kitts and Nevis

Jené Baclawski is an American soccer manager.

== Playing career ==
Baclawski played college soccer for the women's team of Queens University of Charlotte in the United States before attempting and failing her dissertation for a Ph.D. in Sports Studies from the University of Georgia.

== Managerial career ==
From 2008 to 2014, Baclawski managed Southwestern University before working as an instructor for coach license courses and technical director of the South Texas Youth Soccer Association, where she oversaw the education of coaches and the improvement of playing environments in South Texas.

In 2019, Baclawski was appointed manager of the Saint Kitts and Nevis women's national football team ahead of the team's first Women's Olympic qualifying campaign. She also participated in the United States Soccer Federation Play-Practice-Play program to teach soccer with play-focused coaching.

== Personal life ==
Baclwski lives in Austin, United States.
