= 2022 Atlantic Coast Conference women's soccer season =

- League: NCAA Division I
- Sport: Soccer
- Duration: August 18, 2022 – December 5, 2022
- Teams: 14

2023 NWSL Draft
- Top draft pick: Michelle Cooper
- Picked by: Kansas City Current, 2nd overall

Regular season
- Season champions: North Carolina; Florida State
- Season MVP: Offensive: Michelle Cooper; Midfielder: Korbin Albert; Defensive: Eva Gaetino
- Top scorer: Michelle Cooper (Duke)

Tournament
- Champions: Florida State
- Runners-up: North Carolina
- Finals MVP: Jenna Nighswonger (Florida State)

ACC women's soccer seasons
- ← 2021 2023 →

2022 ACC women's soccer standings
	Conf.						Overall
Team	W		L		T	PCT	W		L		T	PCT
No. 2 North Carolina ‍†‍‍^{y}	8	–	2	–	0	.800	20	–	5	–	1	.788
No. 3 Florida State ‍†‍‡‍^{y}	8	–	2	–	0	.800	17	–	3	–	3	.804
No. 5 Notre Dame ‍‍‍^{y}	7	–	2	–	1	.750	17	–	3	–	3	.804
No. 7 Virginia ‍‍‍^{y}	6	–	2	–	2	.700	16	–	4	–	3	.761
No. 6 Duke ‍‍‍^{y}	6	–	2	–	2	.700	15	–	5	–	3	.717
No. 12 Pittsburgh ‍‍‍^{y}	5	–	3	–	2	.600	14	–	5	–	3	.705
Clemson ‍‍‍^{y}	4	–	3	–	3	.550	8	–	5	–	5	.583
Virginia Tech ‍‍‍^{y}	4	–	5	–	1	.450	10	–	7	–	2	.579
Wake Forest ‍‍‍^{y}	3	–	6	–	1	.350	9	–	7	–	3	.553
Louisville ‍‍‍	3	–	7	–	0	.300	6	–	8	–	2	.438
NC State ‍‍‍^{y}	2	–	6	–	2	.300	7	–	7	–	6	.500
Miami (FL) ‍‍‍	2	–	7	–	1	.250	5	–	8	–	3	.406
Syracuse ‍‍‍	1	–	6	–	3	.250	8	–	7	–	3	.528
Boston College ‍‍‍	1	–	7	–	2	.200	5	–	8	–	5	.417
† – Conference champion ‡ – 2022 ACC Tournament champion y – Invited to the NCAA Tournament; Source: The ACC; As of December 6, 2022; Rankings from United Soccer Coaches Poll

The 2022 Atlantic Coast Conference women's soccer season was the 34th season of women's varsity soccer in the conference.

Virginia were the defending regular season champions. Florida State were the defending ACC tournament champions. The Seminoles were also the defending national champions.

North Carolina and Florida State were co-regular season champions with 8–2–0 records. Florida State won the ACC tournament over North Carolina, by a score of 2–1 in the final.

The ACC had ten teams selected to the NCAA tournament, which was the most of any conference. The conference finished with a 20–9–1 overall record in the tournament, with Florida State and North Carolina making it to the semifinals. North Carolina prevailed in the semifinals, but lost to UCLA in the final.

== Teams ==
=== Stadiums and locations ===
Team	Stadium	Capacity
Boston College Eagles	Newton Soccer Complex	1,800
Clemson Tigers	Riggs Field	6,500
Duke Blue Devils	Koskinen Stadium	7,000
Florida State Seminoles	Seminole Soccer Complex	2,000
Louisville Cardinals	Lynn Stadium	5,300
Miami Hurricanes	Cobb Stadium	500
NC State	Dail Soccer Field	3,000
North Carolina Tar Heels	Dorrance Field	4,200
Notre Dame Fighting Irish	Alumni Stadium	2,500
Pittsburgh Panthers	Ambrose Urbanic Field	735
Syracuse Orange	SU Soccer Stadium	1,500
Virginia Cavaliers	Klöckner Stadium	7,100
Virginia Tech Hokies	Thompson Field	2,500
Wake Forest Demon Deacons	Spry Stadium	3,000

1. Georgia Tech does not sponsor women's soccer

== Coaches ==
=== Coaching Changes ===
Pre-Season

- Mark Krikorian resigned as head coach of Florida State on March 29, 2022. Brian Pensky was hired as his replacement on April 25, 2022.

=== Head coaching records ===
Team	Head coach	Years at school	Overall record	Record at school	ACC record
Boston College	Jason Lowe	4	18–28–4	18–28–4	3–24–1
Clemson	Eddie Radwanski	12	256–137–38	117–72–25	50–52–9
Duke	Robbie Church	22	360–184–71	272–135–60	104–63–34
Florida State	Brian Pensky	1	185–111–45	0–0–0	0–0–0
Louisville	Karen Ferguson-Dayes	22	194–175–39	194–175–39	30–38–11
Miami	Sarah Barnes	5	76–82–20	16–41–6	6–30–2
North Carolina	Anson Dorrance	44	863–73–41	863–73–41	213–28–13
NC State	Tim Santoro	10	76–82–17	76–82–17	23–52–8
Notre Dame	Nate Norman	5	97–66–18	39–31–4	19–17–2
Pittsburgh	Randy Waldrum	5	430–142–33	31–34–4	16–32–2
Syracuse	Nicky Adams	4	95–85–26	8–30–3	2–24–1
Virginia	Steve Swanson	22	451–164–64	347–101–53	138–46–23
Virginia Tech	Charles Adair	12	138–68–22	138–68–22	51–46–15
Wake Forest	Tony da Luz	25	329–227–52	284–186–50	96–110–23

Notes

- Records shown are prior to the 2022 season
- Years at school includes the 2022 season

== Pre-season ==
=== Hermann Trophy Watchlist ===
The Hermann Trophy preseason watchlist was released on August 18, 2022. The ACC had eight players named to the sixty player watchlist.

Player	Class	Position	School
Maycee Bell	Senior	DF	North Carolina
Megan Bornkamp	Junior	DF	Clemson
Michelle Cooper	Sophomore	FW	Duke
Eva Gaetino	Junior	DF	Notre Dame
Lia Godfrey	Junior	MF	Virginia
Jameese Joseph	Junior	FW	NC State
Beata Olsson	Junior	FW	Florida State
Kaitlyn Parks	Junior	GK	Wake Forest

=== Pre-season poll ===
==== Pre-season Coaches Poll ====
Predicted finish	Team	Points (1st place)
1	Duke	156 (3)
2	Virginia	153 (4)
3	North Carolina	150 (4)
4	Florida State	143 (3)
5	Clemson	115
6	Notre Dame	108
7	NC State	90
7	Wake Forest	90
9	Virginia Tech	79
10	Pittsburgh	66
11	Louisville	47
12	Boston College	36
13	Miami	21
14	Syracuse	20

==== Pre-season All-ACC Team ====
Position	Player	Class	School
Goalkeeper	Cristina Roque	JR	Florida State
Defender	Maycee Bell	SR	North Carolina
Defender	Megan Bornkamp	JR	Clemson
Midfielder	Korbin Albert	SO	Notre Dame
Midfielder	Lia Godfrey	JR	Virginia
Midfielder	Sophie Jones	SR	Duke
Midfielder	Sam Meza	JR	North Carolina
Midfielder	Jenna Nighswonger	SR	Florida State
Midfielder	Clara Robbins	GR	Florida State
Forward	Michelle Cooper	SO	Duke
Forward	Jameese Joseph	JR	NC State
Forward	Alexa Spaanstra	SR	Virginia

== Regular season ==
=== Conference Matrix ===
The table below shows head-to-head results between teams in conference play. Each team plays ten matches. Each team does not play every other team.

	Boston College	Clemson	Duke	Florida State	Louisville	Miami	North Carolina	NC State	Notre Dame	Pittsburgh	Syracuse	Virginia	Virginia Tech	Wake Forest
vs. Boston College	–	3–0	3–0	6–0	1–0	1–0	3–0	–	3–0	1–1	–	0–1	–	1–1
vs. Clemson	0–3	–	0–0	3–1	1–2	–	–	2–1	0–2	0–0	1–1	–	1–2	4–1
vs. Duke	0–3	0–0	–	5–1	0–4	–	–	0–6	2–2	0–1	0–1	1–0	–	1–2
vs. Florida State	0–6	1–3	1–5	–	1–5	0–1	2–1	–	4–0	0–1	–	0–1	1–4	–
vs. Louisville	0–1	2–1	4–0	5–1	–	0–1	2–0	0–1	2–0	1–0	–	2–0	–	–
vs. Miami	0–1	–	–	1–0	1–0	–	4–0	3–3	–	3–1	3–1	1–0	1–3	2–0
vs. North Carolina	0–3	–	–	1–2	0–2	0–4	–	0–2	–	0–4	0–1	3–2	2–1	0–1
vs. NC State	–	1–2	6–0	–	1–0	3–3	2–0	–	3–0	–	1–1	4–0	1–0	1–2
vs. Notre Dame	0–3	2–0	2–2	0–4	0–2	–	–	0–3	–	3–1	–	0–1	0–1	0–3
vs. Pittsburgh	1–1	0–0	1–0	1–0	0–1	1–3	4–0	–	1–3	–	0–2	–	1–4	–
vs. Syracuse	1–0	1–1	1–0	–	–	1–3	1–0	1–1	–	2–0	–	2–2	2–0	2–0
vs. Virginia	–	–	0–1	1–0	0–2	0–1	2–3	0–4	1–0	–	2–2	–	3–3	0–1
vs. Virginia Tech	–	2–1	–	4–1	–	3–1	1–2	0–1	1–0	4–1	0–2	3–3	–	0–2
vs. Wake Forest	1–1	1–4	2–1	–	–	0–2	1–0	2–1	3–0	–	0–2	1–0	2–0	–
Total	1–7–2	4–3–3	6–2–2	8–2–0	3–7–0	2–7–1	8–2–0	2–6–2	7–2–1	5–3–2	1–6–3	6–2–2	4–5–1	3–6–1

=== Rankings ===
==== United Soccer ====
Legend
Increase in ranking
Decrease in ranking
Not ranked previous week

	Pre	Wk 1	Wk 2	Wk 3	Wk 4	Wk 5	Wk 6	Wk 7	Wk 8	Wk 9	Wk 10	Wk 11	Final
Boston College													
Clemson	25	18			24	14			RV	RV	RV	25	
Duke	2 (2)	5	2	3	3	5	4	7	12	10	11	8	6
Florida State	1 (5)	2	10	8	12т	7	7	3	4	4	5	5	3
Louisville													
Miami													
North Carolina	10	1 (8)	1 (8)	2	2	3	3	5	2т	2	2	2	2
NC State		RV	RV			22							
Notre Dame	16	RV	16	12	6	18	16	17	6	5	4	4	5
Pittsburgh							14	13	21	20	19	19	12
Syracuse													
Virginia	4 (1)	8	5	5	7	2	2	2	13	8	8	11	7
Virginia Tech		RV	RV	RV			RV	24			RV	RV	
Wake Forest	RV	RV	RV	24т	RV								

==== Top Drawer Soccer ====
Legend
Increase in ranking
Decrease in ranking
Not ranked previous week

	Wk 1	Wk 2	Wk 3	Wk 4	Wk 5	Wk 6	Wk 7	Wk 8	Wk 9	Wk 10	Wk 11	Wk 12	Wk 13	Wk 14	Wk 15	Wk 16	Final
Boston College																	
Clemson	15	14	16	18	19	15	24										
Duke	5	3	2	4	5	5	5	6	6	10	9	9	9	9	6	8	8
Florida State	1	2	9	8	7	6	2	2	3	3	4	4	1	1	1	1	4
Louisville																	
Miami																	
North Carolina	8	4	3	3	3	4	4	5	5	5	3	3	4	4	4	4	2
NC State	23	21	17	19	20	19											
Notre Dame	16	15	10	9	8	16	18	15	13	8	6	5	5	5	5	5	5
Pittsburgh							14	10	15	19	19	20	25	22	20	20	20
Syracuse																	
Virginia	2	1	1	2	2	2	3	3	4	4	5	7	12	11	7	6	6
Virginia Tech																	
Wake Forest																	

=== Players of the Week ===
Week	Offensive Player of the week	Defensive Player of the week	Reference
Week 1	Amanda West, Pittsburgh	Tori Hansen, North Carolina	
Week 2	Haley Hopkins, Virginia	Leah Klenke, Notre Dame	
Week 3	Michelle Cooper, Duke	Talia Staude, Virginia	
Week 3	Olivia Wingate, Notre Dame	Talia Staude, Virginia	
Week 4	Kiki Van Zanten, Notre Dame	Sam Meza, North Carolina	
Week 5	Onyi Echegini, Florida State	Harper White, Clemson	
Week 6	Michelle Cooper (2), Duke	Victoria Haugen, Virginia Tech	
Week 7	Lia Godfrey, Virginia	Cayla White, Virginia	
Week 7	Tori Powell, Virginia Tech	Cayla White, Virginia	
Week 8	Olivia Wingate (2), Notre Dame	Mackenzie Wood, Notre Dame	
Week 8	Olivia Wingate (2), Notre Dame	Cristina Roque, Florida State	
Week 9	Taylor Bryan, Virginia Tech	Tori Hansen (2), North Carolina	
Week 9	Haley Hopkins (2), Virginia	Tori Hansen (2), North Carolina	
Week 10	Korbin Albert, Notre Dame	Mackenzie Wood (2), Notre Dame	
Week 10	Ally Sentnor, North Carolina	Mackenzie Wood (2), Notre Dame	
Week 11	Korbin Albert (2), Notre Dame	Caitlyn Lazzarini, Pittsburgh	
Week 11	Onyi Echegini (2), Florida State	Caitlyn Lazzarini, Pittsburgh	

== Postseason ==
=== ACC Tournament ===
Semifinals
1	North Carolina (pen.)	0 (7)
5	Duke	0 (6)
2	Florida State (pen.)	3 (4)
3	Notre Dame	3 (2)

Final
1	North Carolina	1
2	Florida State	2

=== NCAA tournament ===
The Atlantic Coast Conference had ten teams selected to the NCAA tournament, which was the most of any conference. Their two number one seeds was also the most of any conference. Eight of the ten selected teams were seeded, which gained those teams the right to host a first-round match.

Seed	School	Region	1st Round	2nd Round	Round of 16	Quarterfinals	Semifinals	Championship
1	Florida State	Florida State	W 3–0 vs. Florida Gulf Coast – (Tallahassee, FL)	W 4–1 vs. LSU – (Tallahassee, FL)	W 3–0 vs. No. 19 Pittsburgh – (Tallahassee, FL)	W 1–0 vs. No. 9 Arkansas – (Tallahassee, FL)	L 2–3 vs. No. 2 North Carolina – (Cary, NC)	
1	Notre Dame	Notre Dame	W 5–0 vs. Omaha – (Notre Dame, IN)	W 4–0 vs. No. 23 Santa Clara – (Notre Dame, IN)	W 2–0 vs. No. 17 TCU – (Notre Dame, IN)	L 0–2 vs. No. 2 North Carolina – (Notre Dame, IN)		
2	North Carolina	Notre Dame	W 5–0 vs. Old Dominion – (Chapel Hill, NC)	W 3–1 vs. Georgia – (Chapel Hill, NC)	W 3–2 vs No. 15 BYU – (Chapel Hill, NC)	W 2–0 at No. 4 Notre Dame – (Notre Dame, IN)	W 3–2 vs. No. 5 Florida State – (Cary, NC)	L 2–3 (2OT) vs. No. 1 UCLA – (Cary, NC)
2	Duke	Alabama	W 4–0 vs. Radford – (Durham, NC)	W 1–0 vs. No. 16 Texas – (Durham, NC)	W 2–1 vs. No. 13 South Carolina – (Durham, NC)	L 2–3 (2OT) at No. 3 Alabama – (Tuscaloosa, AL)		
3	Virginia	UCLA	W 4–0 vs. Fairleigh Dickinson – (Charlottesville, VA)	W 3–1 vs. Xavier – (University Park, PA)	W 3–2 (2OT) at No. 21 Penn State (University Park, PA)	L 1–2 (2OT) at No. 1 UCLA – (Los Angeles, CA)		
4	Pittsburgh	Florida State	W 1–0 vs. Buffalo – (Pittsburgh, PA)	W 2–1 vs. No. 18 Georgetown – (Tallahassee, FL)	L 0–3 at No. 5 Florida State – (Tallahassee, FL)			
5	Clemson	UCLA	L 0–1 vs. Vanderbilt – (Clemson, SC)					
8	NC State	UCLA	T 1–1 (2–4 PKs) vs. No. 20 UCF – (Raleigh, NC)					
–	Virginia Tech	UCLA	L 0–2 at West Virginia – (Morgantown, WV)					
–	Wake Forest	Alabama	L 0–2 at No. 13 South Carolina – (Columbia, SC)					
W–L (%):			6–3–1 (.650)	6–0–0 (1.000)	5–1–0 (.833)	2–3–0 (.400)	1–1–0 (.500)	0–1–0 (.000) Total: 20–9–1 (.683)

== Awards and honors ==
=== ACC Awards ===
2022 ACC Women's Soccer Individual Awards
Award	Recipient(s)
Coach of the Year	Nate Norman – Notre Dame
Offensive Player of the Year	Michelle Cooper – Duke
Midfielder of the Year	Korbin Albert – Notre Dame
Defensive Player of the Year	Eva Gaetino – Notre Dame
Goalkeeper of the Year	Cristina Roque – Florida State
Freshman of the Year	Kat Rader – Duke

2022 ACC Women's Soccer All-Conference Teams
First Team	Second Team	Third Team	All-Freshman Team
Michelle Cooper – Duke; Olivia Wingate – Notre Dame; Korbin Albert – Notre Dame; Jenna Nighswonger – Florida State; Lia Godfrey – Virginia; Jody Brown – Florida State; Sam Meza – North Carolina; Ally Sentnor – North Carolina; Cristina Roque – Florida State; Eva Gaetino – Notre Dame; Tori Hansen – North Carolina	Haley Hopkins – Virginia; Hal Hershfelt – Clemson; Clara Robbins – Florida State; Onyi Echegini – Florida State; Avery Patterson – North Carolina; Sophie Jones – Duke; LeiLanni Nesbeth – Florida State; Megan Bornkamp – Clemson; Kat Rader – Duke; Delaney Graham – Duke; Ruthie Jones – Duke	Maggie Cagle – Virginia; Jameese Joseph – NC State; Alexa Spaanstra – Virginia; Heather Payne – Florida State; Landy Mertz – Pittsburgh; Maddie Mercado – Notre Dame; Maliah Morris – Clemson; Taylor Price – Virginia Tech; Tessa Dellarose – North Carolina; Mackenzie Wood – Notre Dame; Beata Olsson – Florida State; Caroline Conti – Clemson	Kat Rader – Duke; Maggie Cagle – Virginia; Tessa Dellarose – North Carolina; Leah Klenke – Notre Dame; Taylor Price – Virginia Tech; Heather Gilchrist – Florida State; Maddie Dahlien – North Carolina; Caiya Hanks – Wake Forest; Jill Flammia – Virginia; Shea Vanderbosch – Syracuse; Katie Zailski – Pittsburgh

== 2023 NWSL Draft ==
The ACC had twelve players selected in the 2023 NWSL Draft. Seven of the twelve players were selected in the first round, which was more than half of all first-round picks. Those seven and the twelve overall were the highest by any conference. This was the third straight year where an ACC player was selected as one of the top-five picks.

FW	Forward	MF	Midfielder	DF	Defender	GK	Goalkeeper

Player	Team	Round	Pick #	Position	School
Michelle Cooper	Kansas City Current	1	2	FW	Duke
Emily Madril	Orlando Pride	1	3	DF	Florida State
Jenna Nighswonger	NJ/NY Gotham FC	1	4	MF	Florida State
Olivia Wingate	North Carolina Courage	1	6	FW	Notre Dame
Clara Robbins	North Carolina Courage	1	9	MF	Florida State
Alexa Spaanstra	Kansas City Current	1	10	FW	Virginia
Haley Hopkins	North Carolina Courage	1	11	FW	Virginia
Brianna Martinez	Racing Louisville FC	2	17	DF	Notre Dame
Tori Hansen	Orlando Pride	3	25	DF	North Carolina
Delaney Graham	Washington Spirit	4	40	DF	Duke
Sophie Jones	Chicago Red Stars	4	43	MF	Duke
Giovanna DeMarco	San Diego Wave FC	4	45	MF	Wake Forest
