= 2022 Florida State Seminoles women's soccer team =

2022 Florida State Seminoles women's soccer

ACC Tournament Champions ACC Regular Season Co-Champions

NCAA Tournament, College Cup
- Conference: Atlantic Coast Conference
- U. Soc. Coaches poll: No. 3
- TopDrawerSoccer.com: No. 4
- Record: 17–3–3 (8–2–0 ACC)
- Head coach: Brian Pensky (1st season)
- Assistant coaches: Bobby Shuttleworth (1st season); Aaron Brunner (1st season)
- Home stadium: Seminole Soccer Complex

2022 ACC women's soccer standings
	Conf.						Overall
Team	W		L		T	PCT	W		L		T	PCT
No. 2 North Carolina ‍†‍‍^{y}	8	–	2	–	0	.800	20	–	5	–	1	.788
No. 3 Florida State ‍†‍‡‍^{y}	8	–	2	–	0	.800	17	–	3	–	3	.804
No. 5 Notre Dame ‍‍‍^{y}	7	–	2	–	1	.750	17	–	3	–	3	.804
No. 7 Virginia ‍‍‍^{y}	6	–	2	–	2	.700	16	–	4	–	3	.761
No. 6 Duke ‍‍‍^{y}	6	–	2	–	2	.700	15	–	5	–	3	.717
No. 12 Pittsburgh ‍‍‍^{y}	5	–	3	–	2	.600	14	–	5	–	3	.705
Clemson ‍‍‍^{y}	4	–	3	–	3	.550	8	–	5	–	5	.583
Virginia Tech ‍‍‍^{y}	4	–	5	–	1	.450	10	–	7	–	2	.579
Wake Forest ‍‍‍^{y}	3	–	6	–	1	.350	9	–	7	–	3	.553
Louisville ‍‍‍	3	–	7	–	0	.300	6	–	8	–	2	.438
NC State ‍‍‍^{y}	2	–	6	–	2	.300	7	–	7	–	6	.500
Miami (FL) ‍‍‍	2	–	7	–	1	.250	5	–	8	–	3	.406
Syracuse ‍‍‍	1	–	6	–	3	.250	8	–	7	–	3	.528
Boston College ‍‍‍	1	–	7	–	2	.200	5	–	8	–	5	.417
† – Conference champion ‡ – 2022 ACC Tournament champion y – Invited to the NCAA Tournament; Source: The ACC; As of December 6, 2022; Rankings from United Soccer Coaches Poll

The 2022 Florida State Seminoles women's soccer team represented Florida State University during the 2022 NCAA Division I women's soccer season. It was the 28th season of the university fielding a program. The Seminoles were led by first-year head coach Brian Pensky, who was hired prior to the season to replace long time coach Mark Krikorian.

Florida State finished the season 17–3–3 and 8–2–0 in ACC play to finish in a tie for first place. As the second seed in the ACC Tournament, they received a bye into the Semifinals where they hosted Notre Dame. The match ended in a 3–3 draw and Florida State won the ensuing penalty shoot-out 4–2 to advance to the Final. In the Final, they defeated North Carolina to successfully defend their ACC Tournament title. As tournament champions, they received an automatic bid to the NCAA Tournament and were the first seed in the Florida State Bracket. They defeated Florida Gulf Coast in the First Round, eight-seed LSU in the Second Round, and four-seed Pittsburgh in the Round of 16. They hosted third-seed Arkansas in the Quarterfinals and won 1–0. This set up a rematch with North Carolina in the Semifinals. This time, North Carolina came out on top 3–2 to end the Seminoles' season.

== Previous season ==
The Seminoles finished the season 21–1–3 and 7–1–2 in ACC play to finish in second place. As the second seed in the ACC Tournament, they defeated Wake Forest and Virginia to win the tournament. The win was the program's eighth ACC Tournament title. The Seminoles received an automatic bid to the NCAA Tournament and were awarded a number one seed. The Seminoles defeated South Alabama, SMU, Pepperdine, Michigan, and Rutgers on their way to the tournament final. In the final, they defeated BYU in a penalty shoot-out to be crowned National Champions. Following the season, Krikorian resigned as head coach.

== Offseason ==
=== Departures ===
Departures
Name	Number	Pos.	Height	Year	Hometown	Reason for departure
Alyssa Stadeker	3	DF	5'5"	Freshman	Smyrna, Georgia	Transferred to Georgia
Kristina Lynch	4	FW/MF	5'7"	Senior	Granger, Indiana	Graduated, Transferred to Notre Dame
Jaelin Howell	6	MF	5'8"	Senior	Lone Tree, Colorado	Graduated, Drafted 2nd overall in the 2022 NWSL Draft
Taya Hjorth	9	DF	5'8"	Freshman	Commerce Township, Michigan	Transferred to Kentucky
Kirsten Pavlisko	11	MF/DF	5'6"	Senior	Middleburg, Florida	Graduated
Gabby Carle	16	DF/MF	5'6"	(redshirt) Senior	Quebec, Canada	Graduated
Gianna Mitchell	21	DF	5'10"	(redshirt) Senior	Springfield, Massachusetts	Graduated
Megan Morgan	22	FW	5'4"	Freshman	Weston, Florida	Transferred to Miami (FL)
Emily Madril	25	MF/DF	5'7"	(redshirt) Senior	Navarre, Florida	Graduated
Yujie Zhao	33	MF	5'6"	Senior	Shanghai, China	Graduated

=== Incoming transfers ===
Incoming transfers
Name	Number	Pos.	Height	Year	Hometown	Previous school
Onyi Echegini	6	MF	5'9"	Senior	London, England	Mississippi State

=== Recruiting class ===
Name	Nationality	Hometown	Club	TDS Rating
Summer Denigan; MF	(United States)	Union, Michigan	Nationals	4/5 stars
Olivia Garcia; FW	(United States)	Las Vegas, Nevada	Utah Royals FC	3/5 stars
Heather Gilchrist; DF	(United States)	Boulder, Colorado	Colorado Rapids	4/5 stars
Olivia Lebdaoui; FW	(United States)	Panama City Beach, Florida	Concorde Fire SC	3/5 stars
Sophia Nguyen; MF	(United States)	Pensacola, Florida	Orlando City SC	3/5 stars

== Squad ==
=== Roster ===
As of December 28, 2022

Note: Flags indicate national team as defined under FIFA eligibility rules; some limited exceptions apply. Players may hold more than one non-FIFA nationality.

No.	Pos.	Nation	Player
0	FW	USA	Olivia Garcia
1	GK	PUR	Cristina Roque
2	FW	USA	Jenna Nighswonger
5	MF	USA	Summer Denigan
6	MF	ENG	Onyi Echegini
7	MF	JPN	Ran Iwai
8	DF	USA	Lauren Flynn
9	FW	SWE	Beata Olsson
10	FW	JAM	Jody Brown
12	MF	IRL	Heather Payne
13	FW	BER	LeiLanni Nesbeth

No.	Pos.	Nation	Player
15	MF	USA	Kaitlyn Zipay
16	MF	USA	Sophia Nguyen
17	MF	ENG	Emma Bissell
18	MF	POR	Maria Alagoa
19	FW	USA	Amelia Horton
20	DF	USA	Heather Gilchrist
21	FW	USA	Olivia Lebdaoui
23	GK	USA	Mia Justus
26	DF	USA	Clara Robbins
88	MF	CAN	Melina Descary

=== Team management ===
Position	Staff
Athletic Director	David Coburn
Head coach	Brian Pensky
Assistant Coach	Bobby Shuttleworth
Assistant Coach	Aaron Brunner
Director of Operations	Sarah Buckley
Volunteer Assistant Coach	Andrew Hudson

== Schedule ==
Date Time, TV	Rank^{#}	Opponent^{#}	Result	Record	Site (Attendance) City, State
Non-conference Regular season
August 18*; 7:00 p.m., SECN	No. 1	at No. 12 South Carolina	T 0–0	0–0–1	Stone Stadium (5,000); Columbia, SC
August 21*; 1:00 p.m., ESPNU	No. 1	at Georgia	W 3–1	1–0–1	Foley Field (1,883); Athens, GA
August 25*; 6:00 p.m., ACCN	No. 2	No. 16 Auburn	T 1–1	1–0–2	Seminole Soccer Complex (1,216); Tallahassee, FL
September 4*; 5:00 p.m., SECN+	No. 10	at Florida; Rivalry	W 5–0	2–0–2	James G. Pressly Stadium (1,255); Gainesville, FL
September 8*; 7:00 p.m., ACCNX	No. 8	Florida Gulf Coast	W 5–0	3–0–2	Seminole Soccer Complex (1,215); Tallahassee, FL
September 11*; 2:00 p.m., CUSA.tv	No. 8	at Rice	W 5–0	4–0–2	Holloway Field (491); Houston, TX
ACC Regular season
September 16; 4:00 p.m., ACCNX	No. 12	at Boston College	W 6–0	5–0–2 (1–0–0)	Newton Campus Soccer Field (406); Chestnut Hill, MA
September 22; 7:00 p.m., ACCNX	No. 7	Louisville	W 5–1	6–0–2 (2–0–0)	Seminole Soccer Complex (1,222); Tallahassee, FL
September 25; 1:00 p.m., ACCNX	No. 7	No. 14 Clemson	W 3–1	7–0–2 (3–0–0)	Seminole Soccer Complex (2,125); Tallahassee, FL
October 1; 5:00 p.m., ACCNX	No. 7	at Miami (FL); Rivalry	W 1–0	8–0–2 (4–0–0)	Cobb Stadium (562); Coral Gables, FL
October 6; 8:00 p.m., ACCN	No. 3	at No. 2 Virginia	W 1–0	9–0–2 (5–0–0)	Klöckner Stadium (3,082); Charlottesville, VA
October 9; 12:00 p.m., ESPNU	No. 3	at No. 17 Notre Dame	L 0–4	9–1–2 (5–1–0)	Alumni Stadium (544); Notre Dame, IN
October 13; 6:00 p.m., ACCN	No. 4	No. 12 Duke	W 5–1	10–1–2 (6–1–0)	Seminole Soccer Complex (1,310); Tallahassee, FL
October 20; 8:00 p.m., ACCN	No. 4	No. 2 North Carolina	L 1–2	10–2–2 (6–2–0)	Seminole Soccer Complex (2,169); Tallahassee, FL
October 23; 1:00 p.m., ACCNX	No. 4	at No. 20 Pittsburgh	W 1–0	11–2–2 (7–2–2)	Ambrose Urbanic Field (832); Pittsburgh, PA
October 27; 7:00 p.m., ACCNX	No. 5	Virginia Tech	W 4–1	12–2–2 (8–2–2)	Seminole Soccer Complex (1,227); Tallahassee, FL
ACC tournament
November 3; 8:00 p.m., ACCN	(2) No. 5	vs. (3) No. 4 Notre Dame; Semifinal	T 3–3 (4–2 PKs)	12–2–3	Sahlen's Stadium (2,686); Cary, NC
November 6; 12:00 p.m., ESPNU	(2) No. 5	vs. (1) No. 2 North Carolina; Final	W 2–1	13–2–3	Sahlen's Stadium (3,876); Cary, NC
NCAA tournament
November 11; 5:00 p.m., ESPN+	(1) No. 5	Florida Gulf Coast; First Round	W 3–0	14–2–3	Seminole Soccer Complex (1,347); Tallahassee, FL
November 18; 5:30 p.m., ESPN+	(1) No. 5	(8) LSU; Second Round	W 4–1	15–2–3	Seminole Soccer Complex (1,668); Tallahassee, FL
November 29; 5:00 p.m., ESPN+	(1) No. 5	(4) No. 19 Pittsburgh; Round of Sixteen	W 3–0	16–2–3	Seminole Soccer Complex (1,238); Tallahassee, FL
November 26; 5:00 p.m., ESPN+	(1) No. 5	(3) No. 9 Arkansas; Quarterfinal	W 1–0	17–2–3	Seminole Soccer Complex (2,667); Tallahassee, FL
December 2; 6:00 p.m., ESPNU	(1) No. 5	vs. (2) No. 2 North Carolina; Semifinal	L 2–3	17–3–3	WakeMed Soccer Park (10,000); Cary, NC
*Non-conference game. ^{#}Rankings from United Soccer Coaches. (#) Tournament seedings in parentheses. All times are in Eastern.

== Awards and honors ==
Recipient	Award	Date	Ref.
Cristina Roque	Pre-season All-ACC Team	August 11	
Jenna Nighswonger	Pre-season All-ACC Team	August 11	
Clara Robbins	Pre-season All-ACC Team	August 11	
Beata Olsson	Pre-season Hermann Trophy Watchlist	August 18	
Onyi Echegini	ACC Offensive Player of the Week	September 20	
Cristina Roque	ACC Co-Defensive Player of the Week	October 11	
Onyi Echegini	ACC Co-Offensive Player of the Week	November 1	
Cristina Roque	ACC Goalkeeper of the Year	November 2	
Jenna Nighswonger	All ACC-First Team	November 2	
Jody Brown	All ACC-First Team	November 2	
Cristina Roque	All ACC-First Team	November 2	
Clara Robbins	All ACC-Second Team	November 2	
Onyi Echegini	All ACC-Second Team	November 2	
LeiLanni Nesbeth	All ACC-Second Team	November 2	
Heather Payne	All ACC-Third Team	November 2	
Beata Olsson	All ACC-Third Team	November 2	
Heather Gilchrist	ACC All-Freshman Team	November 2	
Jenna Nighswonger	ACC Tournament MVP	November 6	
Jody Brown	All-ACC Tournament Team	November 6	
Onyi Echegini	All-ACC Tournament Team	November 6	
Beata Olsson	All-ACC Tournament Team	November 6	
Jenna Nighswonger	First Team All-Region	November 29	
Cristina Roque	First Team All-Region	November 29	
Jody Brown	First Team All-Region	November 29	
Clara Robbins	Second Team All-Region	November 29	
Jenna Nighswonger	United Soccer Coaches First Team All-American	December 2	
Cristina Roque	United Soccer Coaches Third Team All-American	December 2	
Jody Brown	United Soccer Coaches Third Team All-American	December 2	
Jenna Nighswonger	Hermann Trophy finalist	December 8	
Jenna Nighswonger	Honda Award finalist	December 14	

== Rankings ==
Ranking movements Legend: ██ Increase in ranking ██ Decrease in ranking т = Tied with team above or below ( ) = First-place votes
	Week																
Poll	Pre	1	2	3	4	5	6	7	8	9	10	11	12	13	14	15	Final
United Soccer	1 (5)	2	10	8	12 т	7	7	3	4	4	5	5	Not released				3
TopDrawer Soccer	1	2	9	8	7	6	2	2	3	3	4	4	1	1	1	1	4

== NWSL Draft ==
Player	Team	Round	Pick #	Position
Emily Madril	Orlando Pride	1	3	MF
Jenna Nighswonger	Gotham FC	1	4	FW
Clara Robbins	North Carolina Courage	1	9	DF
