= 2022 Virginia Cavaliers women's soccer team =

American Women's Soccer Team

2022 Virginia Cavaliers women's soccer

NCAA Tournament, Quarterfinals
- Conference: Atlantic Coast Conference
- U. Soc. Coaches poll: No. 7
- TopDrawerSoccer.com: No. 6
- Record: 16–4–3 (6–2–2 ACC)
- Head coach: Steve Swanson (23rd season)
- Assistant coaches: Ron Raab (17th season); Sam Raper (1st season)
- Home stadium: Klöckner Stadium

2022 ACC women's soccer standings
| | Conf. | | | | | | Overall |
| Team | W | | L | | T | PCT | W | | L | | T | PCT |
|---|---|---|---|---|---|---|---|---|---|---|---|---|
| No. 2 North Carolina ‍†‍‍^{y} | 8 | – | 2 | – | 0 | .800 | 20 | – | 5 | – | 1 | .788 |
| No. 3 Florida State ‍†‍‡‍^{y} | 8 | – | 2 | – | 0 | .800 | 17 | – | 3 | – | 3 | .804 |
| No. 5 Notre Dame ‍‍‍^{y} | 7 | – | 2 | – | 1 | .750 | 17 | – | 3 | – | 3 | .804 |
| No. 7 Virginia ‍‍‍^{y} | 6 | – | 2 | – | 2 | .700 | 16 | – | 4 | – | 3 | .761 |
| No. 6 Duke ‍‍‍^{y} | 6 | – | 2 | – | 2 | .700 | 15 | – | 5 | – | 3 | .717 |
| No. 12 Pittsburgh ‍‍‍^{y} | 5 | – | 3 | – | 2 | .600 | 14 | – | 5 | – | 3 | .705 |
| Clemson ‍‍‍^{y} | 4 | – | 3 | – | 3 | .550 | 8 | – | 5 | – | 5 | .583 |
| Virginia Tech ‍‍‍^{y} | 4 | – | 5 | – | 1 | .450 | 10 | – | 7 | – | 2 | .579 |
| Wake Forest ‍‍‍^{y} | 3 | – | 6 | – | 1 | .350 | 9 | – | 7 | – | 3 | .553 |
| Louisville ‍‍‍ | 3 | – | 7 | – | 0 | .300 | 6 | – | 8 | – | 2 | .438 |
| NC State ‍‍‍^{y} | 2 | – | 6 | – | 2 | .300 | 7 | – | 7 | – | 6 | .500 |
| Miami (FL) ‍‍‍ | 2 | – | 7 | – | 1 | .250 | 5 | – | 8 | – | 3 | .406 |
| Syracuse ‍‍‍ | 1 | – | 6 | – | 3 | .250 | 8 | – | 7 | – | 3 | .528 |
| Boston College ‍‍‍ | 1 | – | 7 | – | 2 | .200 | 5 | – | 8 | – | 5 | .417 |
† – Conference champion ‡ – 2022 ACC Tournament champion y – Invited to the NCAA Tournament; Source: The ACC; As of December 6, 2022; Rankings from United Soccer Coaches Poll

The 2022 Virginia Cavaliers women's soccer team represented the University of Virginia during the 2022 NCAA Division I women's soccer season. The Cavaliers were led by head coach Steve Swanson, in his twenty third season. They played home games at Klöckner Stadium. This was the team's 37th season playing organized women's college soccer and their 35th playing in the Atlantic Coast Conference.

The team finished 16–4–3 overall and 6–2–2 in ACC play to finish in a tie for fourth place. As the fourth-seed in the ACC Tournament, they hosted Duke in the First Round and lost 2–1. They received an at-large bid to the NCAA Tournament, where they were the third-seed in the UCLA Bracket. They defeated Fairleigh Dickinson in the First Round, Xavier in the Second Round, two-seed Penn State in the Round of 16 before falling to eventual champions UCLA in the Quarterfinals to end their season.

== Previous season ==
The Cavaliers finished the season 18–3–2 and 8–0–2 in ACC play to finish as regular season champions. As the top seed in the ACC Tournament they received a bye into the Semifinals. They defeated Clemson before losing to Florida State in the Final. They received an at-large bid to the NCAA Tournament and were one of the four number one seeds. They defeated High Point in the First Round and Milwaukee in the Second Round before losing to BYU in the Sweet 16 to end their season.

== Offseason ==
=== Departures ===
Departures
| Name | Number | Pos. | Height | Year | Hometown | Reason for departure |
|---|---|---|---|---|---|---|
| Laurel Ivory | 0 | GK | 5'9" | Graduate Student | Surfside, Florida | Graduated |
| Sydney Zandi | 2 | MF | 5'5" | Graduate Student | West Chester, Pennsylvania | Graduated |
| Cam Lexow | 4 | FW | 5'9" | Junior | Abington, Pennsylvania | N/A |
| Lizzy Sieracki | 5 | DF | 5'6" | Graduate Student | Acworth, Georgia | Graduated, became Volunteer Assistant Coach |
| Diana Ordóñez | 9 | FW | 5'11" | Junior | Prosper, Texas | Graduated, drafted 6th overall in the 2022 NWSL Draft |
| Taryn Torres | 10 | MF | 5'6" | Graduate Student | Frisco, Texas | Graduated |
| Madeline Simpson | 19 | MF | 5'7" | Freshman | Atlanta, Georgia | N/A |
| Lauren Hinton | 21 | MF | 5'4" | Senior | Parker, Texas | Graduated |
| Kia Maguire | 24 | DF | 5'6" | Junior | Hingham, Massachusetts | Transferred to Brown |

=== Incoming transfers ===
Incoming transfers
| Name | Number | Pos. | Height | Year | Hometown | Previous school |
|---|---|---|---|---|---|---|
| Chloe Japic | 21 | MF | 5'6" | Junior | Palo Alto, California | Baylor |
| Grace Santos | 28 | MF | 5'7" | Junior | Charlottesville, Virginia | Arizona |

=== Recruiting class ===
| Name | Nationality | Hometown | Club | TDS Rating |
|---|---|---|---|---|
| Maggie Cagle; MF | (United States) | Phoenix, Arizona | Phoenix Rising FC | 4/5 stars |
| Maya Carter; MF | (United States) | Troy, Michigan | Michigan Hawks | 4/5 stars |
| Jill Flammia; MF | (United States) | Manakin-Sabot, Virginia | Richmond United | 4/5 stars |
| Tatum Galvin; DF | (United States) | Dallas, Texas | IMG Academy | 3/5 stars |
| Meredith McDermott; FW | (United States) | Nashua, New Hampshire | FC Stars of Massachusetts | 3/5 stars |
| Helen Symbas; DF | (United States) | Atlanta, Georgia | Concorde Fire SC | 3/5 stars |

== Squad ==
=== Roster ===
As of September 26, 2022

Note: Flags indicate national team as defined under FIFA eligibility rules; some limited exceptions apply. Players may hold more than one non-FIFA nationality.

| No. | Pos. | Nation | Player |
|---|---|---|---|
| 0 | GK | USA | Cayla White |
| 1 | GK | USA | Michaela Moran |
| 2 | MF | USA | Peyton Goldthwaite |
| 3 | MF | USA | Alexis Theoret |
| 5 | MF | USA | Laughlin Ryan |
| 6 | FW | USA | Jansen Eichenlaub |
| 7 | FW | USA | Alexa Spaanstra |
| 8 | DF | USA | Sarah Clark |
| 9 | FW | USA | Meredith McDermott |
| 10 | FW | USA | Maggie Cagle |
| 11 | MF | USA | Lacey McCormack |
| 12 | DF | HAI | Claire Constant |
| 13 | FW | USA | Rebecca Jarrett |
| 14 | MF | USA | Emma Dawson |
| 15 | FW | USA | Brianna Jablonowski |
| 16 | DF | USA | Kiki Maki |
| 17 | FW | USA | Haley Hopkins |

| No. | Pos. | Nation | Player |
|---|---|---|---|
| 18 | FW | USA | Sarah Brunner |
| 19 | MF | USA | Jill Flammia |
| 20 | DF | USA | Talia Staude |
| 21 | MF | USA | Chloe Japic |
| 22 | MF | USA | Lia Godfrey |
| 23 | DF | USA | Laney Rouse |
| 24 | MF | USA | Charlotte McClure |
| 25 | DF | USA | Samar Guidry |
| 26 | FW | USA | Maya Carter |
| 27 | MF | USA | Maggie Fralin |
| 28 | MF | USA | Grace Santos |
| 29 | GK | USA | Camryn Miller |
| 30 | FW | USA | Degen Miller |
| 31 | DF | USA | Helen Symbas |
| 32 | DF | USA | Tatum Galvin |
| 33 | GK | USA | Ally Reynolds |

=== Team management ===
| Position | Staff |
|---|---|
| Athletic Director | Carla Williams |
| Head Coach | Steve Swanson |
| Associate head coach | Ron Raab |
| Assistant Coach | Sam Raper |
| Volunteer Assistant Coach | Lizzy Sieracki |
| Director of Operations | Eilidh Thomson |

== Schedule ==
| Date Time, TV | Rank^{#} | Opponent^{#} | Result | Record | Site (Attendance) City, State |
Exhibition
| August 10*; Noon | No. 4 | vs. Illinois | L 1–2 | – | Central Michigan Soccer Complex; Maple City, MI |
| August 13*; Noon | No. 4 | at No. 9 Michigan | T 1–1 | – | U-M Soccer Stadium; Ann Arbor, MI |
Non-conference Regular season
| August 18*; 7:00 p.m., ACCNX | No. 4 | George Mason | W 3–1 | 1–0–0 | Klöckner Stadium (1,117); Charlottesville, VA |
| August 21*; 6:00 p.m., ACCNX | No. 4 | Loyola (MD) | W 6–0 | 2–0–0 | Klöckner Stadium (1,181); Charlottesville, VA |
| August 25*; 4:00 p.m., FloSports | No. 8 | at No. 11 Georgetown | W 1–0 | 3–0–0 | Shaw Field (257); Washington, D.C. |
| August 28*; 2:00 p.m., ACCNX | No. 8 | Fairleigh Dickinson | W 5–0 | 4–0–0 | Klöckner Stadium (1,282); Charlottesville, VA |
| September 1*; 5:00 p.m., ACCNX | No. 5 | James Madison | W 2–0 | 5–0–0 | Klöckner Stadium (1,431); Charlottesville, VA |
| September 4*; 6:00 p.m., ACCNX | No. 5 | No. 23 Memphis | W 5–0 | 6–0–0 | Klöckner Stadium (1,508); Charlottesville, VA |
| September 8*; 6:00 p.m., ACCNX | No. 5 | Oregon State | W 5–0 | 7–0–0 | Klöckner Stadium (1,016); Charlottesville, VA |
| September 11*; 2:00 p.m., ACCNX | No. 5 | VCU | T 0–0 | 7–0–1 | Klöckner Stadium (1,403); Charlottesville, VA |
ACC regular season
| September 17; 6:00 p.m., ACCNX | No. 7 | at No. 2 North Carolina | W 3–2 | 8–0–1 (1–0–0) | Dorrance Field (3,912); Chapel Hill, NC |
| September 22; 7:00 p.m., ACCNX | No. 2 | at No. 18 Notre Dame | L 0–1 | 8–1–1 (1–1–0) | Alumni Stadium (718); Notre Dame, IN |
| September 25; 2:00 p.m., ACCNX | No. 2 | Louisville | W 2–0 | 9–1–1 (2–1–0) | Klöckner Stadium (1,924); Charlottesville, VA |
| October 2; 1:00 p.m., ACCNX | No. 2 | at No. 4 Duke | W 1–0 | 10–1–1 (3–1–0) | Koskinen Stadium (848); Durham, NC |
| October 6; 8:00 p.m., ACCN | No. 2 | No. 3 Florida State | L 0–1 | 10–2–1 (3–2–0) | Klöckner Stadium (3,082); Charlottesville, VA |
| October 9; 2:00 p.m., ACCNX | No. 2 | Syracuse | T 2–2 | 10–2–2 (3–2–1) | Klöckner Stadium (1,795); Charlottesville, VA |
| October 13; 8:00 p.m., ACCN | No. 13 | at Virginia Tech; Rivalry | T 3–3 | 10–2–3 (3–2–2) | Thompson Field (1,702); Blacksburg, VA |
| October 20; 7:00 p.m., ACCNX | No. 8 | Wake Forest | W 1–0 | 11–2–3 (4–2–2) | Klöckner Stadium (1,317); Charlottesville, VA |
| October 23; 2:00 p.m., ACCNX | No. 8 | NC State | W 4–0 | 12–2–3 (5–2–2) | Klöckner Stadium (2,032); Charlottesville, VA |
| October 27; 6:00 p.m., ACCN | No. 8 | at Miami (FL) | W 1–0 | 13–2–3 (6–2–2) | Cobb Stadium (287); Coral Gables, FL |
ACC tournament
| October 30; 8:00 p.m., ACCN | (4) No. 11 | (5) No. 8 Duke; First Round | L 1–2 | 13–3–3 | Klöckner Stadium (691); Charlottesville, VA |
NCAA tournament
| November 12; 6:00 p.m., ESPN+ | (3) No. 11 | Fairleigh Dickinson; First Round | W 4–0 | 14–3–3 | Klöckner Stadium (1,118); Charlottesville, VA |
| November 18; 2:00 p.m., ESPN+ | (3) No. 11 | vs. Xavier; Second Round | W 3–1 | 15–3–3 | Jeffrey Field (261); University Park, PA |
| November 20; 5:00 p.m., ESPN+ | (3) No. 11 | at (2) No. 21 Penn State; Round of 16 | W 3–2 ^{2OT} | 16–3–3 | Jeffrey Field (474); University Park, PA |
| November 26; 9:00 p.m., ESPN+ | (3) No. 11 | at (1) No. 1 UCLA; Quarterfinal | L 1–2 ^{2OT} | 16–4–3 | Wallis Annenberg Stadium (2,419); Los Angeles, CA |
*Non-conference game. ^{#}Rankings from United Soccer Coaches. (#) Tournament seedings in parentheses. All times are in Eastern.

== Awards and honors ==
| Recipient | Award | Date | Ref. |
|---|---|---|---|
| Lia Godfrey | Preseason All-ACC Team | August 11 | |
| Alexa Spaanstra | Preseason All-ACC Team | August 11 | |
| Lia Godfrey | Hermann Trophy Preseason Watchlist | August 18 | |
| Haley Hopkins | ACC Offensive Player of the Week | August 30 | |
| Talia Staude | ACC Defensive Player of the Week | September 6 | |
| Lia Godfrey | ACC Co-offensive Player of the Week | October 4 | |
| Cayla White | ACC Defensive Player of the Week | October 4 | |
| Haley Hopkins | ACC Co-offensive Player of the Week | October 18 | |
| Lia Godfrey | All-ACC First Team | November 2 | |
| Haley Hopkins | All-ACC Second Team | November 2 | |
| Maggie Cagle | All-ACC Third Team | November 2 | |
| Alexa Spaanstra | All-ACC Third Team | November 2 | |
| Maggie Cagle | ACC All-Freshman Team | November 2 | |
| Jill Flammia | ACC All-Freshman Team | November 2 | |
| Lia Godfrey | All-American | December 2 | |

== Rankings ==
Ranking movements Legend: ██ Increase in ranking ██ Decrease in ranking ( ) = First-place votes
| | Week | | | | | | | | | | | | | | | | |
| Poll | Pre | 1 | 2 | 3 | 4 | 5 | 6 | 7 | 8 | 9 | 10 | 11 | 12 | 13 | 14 | 15 | Final |
|---|---|---|---|---|---|---|---|---|---|---|---|---|---|---|---|---|---|
| United Soccer | 4 (1) | 8 | 5 | 5 | 7 | 2 | 2 | 2 | 13 | 8 | 8 | 11 | Not released | | | | 7 |
| TopDrawer Soccer | 2 | 1 | 1 | 2 | 2 | 2 | 3 | 3 | 4 | 4 | 5 | 7 | 12 | 11 | 7 | 6 | 6 |

== 2023 NWSL Draft ==
| Player | Team | Round | Pick # | Position |
|---|---|---|---|---|
| Alexa Spaanstra | Kansas City Current | 1 | 10 | FW |
| Haley Hopkins | North Carolina Courage | 1 | 11 | FW |
