= 2022 North Carolina Tar Heels women's soccer team =

American college soccer season

2022 North Carolina Tar Heels women's soccer

ACC Regular Season Co-Champions

NCAA Tournament, Runner-Up
- Conference: Atlantic Coast Conference
- U. Soc. Coaches poll: No. 2
- TopDrawerSoccer.com: No. 2
- Record: 20–5–1 (8–2–0 ACC)
- Head coach: Anson Dorrance (46th season)
- Assistant coaches: Damon Nahas (7th season); Nathan Thackeray (1st season)
- Home stadium: Dorrance Field

2022 ACC women's soccer standings
	Conf.						Overall
Team	W		L		T	PCT	W		L		T	PCT
No. 2 North Carolina ‍†‍‍^{y}	8	–	2	–	0	.800	20	–	5	–	1	.788
No. 3 Florida State ‍†‍‡‍^{y}	8	–	2	–	0	.800	17	–	3	–	3	.804
No. 5 Notre Dame ‍‍‍^{y}	7	–	2	–	1	.750	17	–	3	–	3	.804
No. 7 Virginia ‍‍‍^{y}	6	–	2	–	2	.700	16	–	4	–	3	.761
No. 6 Duke ‍‍‍^{y}	6	–	2	–	2	.700	15	–	5	–	3	.717
No. 12 Pittsburgh ‍‍‍^{y}	5	–	3	–	2	.600	14	–	5	–	3	.705
Clemson ‍‍‍^{y}	4	–	3	–	3	.550	8	–	5	–	5	.583
Virginia Tech ‍‍‍^{y}	4	–	5	–	1	.450	10	–	7	–	2	.579
Wake Forest ‍‍‍^{y}	3	–	6	–	1	.350	9	–	7	–	3	.553
Louisville ‍‍‍	3	–	7	–	0	.300	6	–	8	–	2	.438
NC State ‍‍‍^{y}	2	–	6	–	2	.300	7	–	7	–	6	.500
Miami (FL) ‍‍‍	2	–	7	–	1	.250	5	–	8	–	3	.406
Syracuse ‍‍‍	1	–	6	–	3	.250	8	–	7	–	3	.528
Boston College ‍‍‍	1	–	7	–	2	.200	5	–	8	–	5	.417
† – Conference champion ‡ – 2022 ACC Tournament champion y – Invited to the NCAA Tournament; Source: The ACC; As of December 6, 2022; Rankings from United Soccer Coaches Poll

The 2022 North Carolina Tar Heels women's soccer team represented the University of North Carolina at Chapel Hill during the 2022 NCAA Division I women's soccer season. It was the 46th season of the university fielding a program. The Tar Heels were led by 46th year head coach Anson Dorrance and played their home games at Dorrance Field in Chapel Hill, North Carolina.

The team finished the season 20–5–1 and 8–2–0 in ACC play to finish in a tie for first place. As the first seed in the ACC Tournament, they hosted rival Duke in the Semifinal after receiving a First Round bye and drew 0–0. The Tar Heels won the ensuing penalty shoot-out 7–6 to advance to the final where they lost to Florida State. They received an at-large bid to the 2022 NCAA Division I women's soccer tournament where they were the second seed in the Notre Dame Bracket. They defeated Old Dominion in the First Round, seven-seed Georgia in the Second Round, and six-seed BYU in the Round of 16. They then had to travel to Notre Dame to face one-seed Notre Dame. The Tar Heels advanced with a 2–0 win to the College Cup, where they would face Florida State again. The Tar Heels won the rematch of the ACC Tournament Final 3–2 and advanced to the national title game against UCLA. North Carolina lost a tight match 3–2, with UCLA scoring goals in the 80th and 89th minutes to force overtime and scoring the game winner in the 107th minute.

== Previous season ==
The Tar Heels finished the season 12–3–3, 5–2–3 in ACC play to finish in a tie for sixth place. Only six teams qualified for the ACC Tournament and the Tar Heels lost the tiebreaker to Wake Forest and did not qualify for the tournament. This was the first time in program history that North Carolina missed out on the ACC Tournament. They received an at-large bid to the 2021 NCAA Division I women's soccer tournament where they lost to South Carolina in the First Round. Their First Round exit was the earliest exit of any NCAA Tournament they had participated in.

== Offseason ==
=== Departures ===
Departures
Name	Number	Pos.	Height	Year	Hometown	Reason for departure
Claudia Dickey	0	GK	5'10"	Senior	Charlotte, North Carolina	Graduated; Drafted 20th overall in the 2022 NWSL Draft
Mary Elliot McCabe	5	MF/DF	5'5"	Senior	Charlotte, North Carolina	Graduated
Rachael Dorwart	9	FW/MF	5'9"	Senior	Mechanicsburg, Pennsylvania	Graduated
Madi Pry	23	MF	5'8"	Sophomore	Pinehurst, North Carolina	N/A
Hallie Klanke	26	DF/FW	5'5"	Junior	Lee's Summit, Missouri	Transferred to Kansas
Meilin Gregg	29	MF	5'3"	Freshman	Charlottesville, Virginia	N/A
Annika Huhta	31	MF	5'4"	Freshman	Helsinki, Finland	Transferred to UCF
Mollie Baker	71	FW	5'7"	Sophomore	Gilbert, Arizona	Transferred to LSU
Carly Wetzel	82	MF	5'4"	Senior	Clarksville, Maryland	Graduated
Anna Priborkina	98	FW	5'7"	Freshman	Manalapan, New Jersey	N/A

=== Incoming transfers ===
Incoming transfers
Name	Number	Pos.	Height	Year	Hometown	Previous school
Sarah Bayer	82	FW	5'4"	Graduate Student	Merrick, New York	Loyola (MD)

=== Recruiting class ===
Name	Nationality	Hometown	Club	TDS Rating
Sydney Cheesman; DF	(United States)	Lafayette, Colorado	Colorado Rush	4/5 stars
Maddie Dahlien; FW	(United States)	Edina, Minnesota	Minnesota Thunder Academy	4/5 stars
Tori DellaPeruta; FW	(United States)	Cumming, Georgia	United Futbol Academy (GA)	4/5 stars
Tessa Dellarose; FW	(United States)	Grindstone, Pennsylvania	Pittsburgh Riverhounds	4/5 stars
Kate Faasse; FW	(United States)	Phoenix, Arizona	SC del Sol	4/5 stars
Madelyn Galbus; FW	(United States)	Wilmington, Delaware	Penn Fusion	3/5 stars
Kayleigh Herr; DF	(United States)	Cary, North Carolina	North Carolina Courage Academy	4/5 stars
Nona Reason; GK	(United States)	Noblesville, Indiana	Slammers FC HB Koge	4/5 stars
Maci Teater; MF	(United States)	Saint Louis, Missouri	St. Louis Scott Gallagher	4/5 stars

== Squad ==
=== Roster ===
As of December 28, 2022

Note: Flags indicate national team as defined under FIFA eligibility rules; some limited exceptions apply. Players may hold more than one non-FIFA nationality.

No.	Pos.	Nation	Player
0	GK	USA	Nona Reason
1	FW	USA	Sam Meza
2	DF	USA	Abby Allen
3	MF	ENG	Ruby Grant
4	DF	USA	Paige Tolentino
5	FW	USA	Maddie Dahlien
6	MF	USA	Emerson Elgin
7	DF	USA	Julia Dorsey
8	FW	USA	Emily Moxley
9	FW	USA	Tori DellaPeruta
10	MF	USA	Rachel Jones
11	MF	USA	Lauren Wrigley
12	DF	USA	Sydney Cheesman
13	FW	USA	Isabel Cox
14	MF	USA	Kai Hayes
15	FW	USA	Avery Patterson
16	FW	USA	Aleigh Gambone
17	GK	USA	Marz Josephson
18	MF	USA	Bella Sember

No.	Pos.	Nation	Player
19	MF	USA	Emily Colton
20	MF	USA	Libby Moore
21	FW	USA	Ally Sentnor
22	DF	USA	Tori Hansen
23	MF	USA	Maci Teater
24	FW	USA	Talia DellaPeruta
25	DF	USA	Maycee Bell
26	FW	USA	Kate Faasse
27	MF	USA	Makenna Dominguez
28	MF	USA	Maggie Pierce
30	DF	USA	Kayleigh Herr
32	GK	USA	Emmie Allen
33	MF	USA	Riley Quinlan
34	DF	USA	Tessa Dellarose
35	FW	IRL	Emily Murphy
39	FW	USA	Asha Means
82	FW	USA	Sarah Bayer
98	FW	USA	Madelyn Galbus

=== Team management ===
Position	Staff
Athletic Director	Bubba Cunningham
Head coach	Anson Dorrance
Associate head coach	Damon Nahas
Assistant Coach	Nathan Thackeray
Assistant Coach	Heather O'Reilly
General Manager	Chris Ducar
Director of Operations	Tom Sander

== Schedule ==
Date Time, TV	Rank^{#}	Opponent^{#}	Result	Record	Site (Attendance) City, State
Exhibition
August 7; 11:00 a.m.	No. 10	VCU	W 5–0	–	Dorrance Field (559); Chapel Hill, NC
August 13; 6:00 p.m.	No. 10	No. 3 BYU	W 2–0	–	Dorrance Field (1,530); Chapel Hill, NC
Non-conference Regular season
August 18; 7:00 p.m., ACCNX	No. 10	No. 11 Tennessee	W 3–0	1–0–0	Dorrance Field (4,028); Chapel Hill, NC
August 21; 1:00 p.m., ACCNX	No. 10	UNC Wilmington	W 2–0	2–0–0	Dorrance Field (1,836); Chapel Hill, NC
August 25; 8:00 p.m., LHN	No. 1	at Texas	W 2–0	3–0–0	Myers Stadium (3,264); Austin, TX
August 28; 1:00 p.m., LHN	No. 1	vs. Baylor	W 6–0	4–0–0	Myers Stadium (465); Austin, TX
September 1; 1:00 p.m., SECN+	No. 1	at Missouri	W 3–1	5–0–0	Walton Soccer Stadium (300); Columbia, MO
September 4; 12:00 p.m., ACCN	No. 1	No. 3 UCLA	L 1–2	5–1–0	Dorrance Field (3,404); Chapel Hill, NC
September 8; 8:00 p.m., ACCN	No. 2	at No. 3 Duke; Rivalry	W 3–0	6–1–0	Koskinen Stadium (3,527); Durham, NC
September 11; 1:00 p.m., ACCNX	No. 2	UCF	W 2–1	7–1–0	Dorrance Field (1,633); Chapel Hill, NC
ACC regular season
September 17; 6:00 p.m., ACCNX	No. 2	No. 7т Virginia	L 2–3	7–2–0 (0–1–0)	Dorrance Field (3,912); Chapel Hill, NC
September 22; 7:00 p.m., ACCNX	No. 3	at Syracuse	W 1–0	8–2–0 (1–1–0)	SU Soccer Stadium (143); Syracuse, NY
September 25; 1:00 p.m., ACCNX	No. 3	Boston College	W 3–0	9–2–0 (2–1–0)	Dorrance Field (2,111); Chapel Hill, NC
October 1; 7:00 p.m., ACCNX	No. 3	at Virginia Tech	L 1–2	9–3–0 (2–2–0)	Thompson Field (284); Blacksburg, VA
October 6; 7:00 p.m., ACCNX	No. 5	No. 13 Pittsburgh	W 4–0	10–3–0 (3–2–0)	Dorrance Field (2,602); Chapel Hill, NC
October 9; 1:00 p.m., ACCNX	No. 5	NC State; Rivalry	W 2–0	11–3–0 (4–2–0)	Dorrance Field (3,683); Chapel Hill, NC
October 14; 7:00 p.m., ACCNX	No. 2т	Wake Forest	W 1–0	12–3–0 (5–2–0)	Dorrance Field (3,263); Chapel Hill, NC
October 20; 8:00 p.m., ACCN	No. 2	at No. 4 Florida State	W 2–1	13–3–0 (6–2–0)	Seminole Soccer Complex (2,169); Tallahassee, FL
October 23; 1:00 p.m., ACCNX	No. 2	at Miami (FL)	W 4–0	14–3–0 (7–2–0)	Cobb Stadium (414); Coral Gables, FL
October 27; 6:00 p.m., ACCN	No. 2	at Louisville	W 2–0	15–3–0 (8–2–0)	Lynn Stadium (450); Louisville, KY
ACC tournament
November 3; 5:30 p.m., ACCN	(1) No. 2	vs. (5) No. 8 Duke; Semifinal, Rivalry	T 0–0 (7–6 PKs)	15–3–1	Sahlen's Stadium (2,686); Cary, NC
November 6; 12:00 p.m., ESPNU	(1) No. 2	vs. (2) No. 5 Florida State; Final	L 1–2	15–4–1	Sahlen's Stadium (3,879); Cary, NC
NCAA tournament
November 12; 7:00 p.m., ESPN+	(2) No. 2	Old Dominion; First Round	W 5–0	16–4–1	Dorrance Field (1,531); Chapel Hill, NC
November 17; 6:00 p.m., ESPN+	(2) No. 2	(7) Georgia; Second Round	W 3–1	17–4–1	Dorrance Field (1,152); Chapel Hill, NC
November 19; 11:30 a.m., ESPN+	(2) No. 2	(6) No. 15 BYU; Round of 16	W 3–2	18–4–1	Dorrance Field (1,605); Chapel Hill, NC
November 26; 6:00 p.m., ESPN+	(2) No. 2	(1) No. 4 Notre Dame; Quarterfinal	W 2–0	19–4–1	Alumni Stadium (1,828); Notre Dame, IN
December 2; 6:00 p.m., ESPNU	(2) No. 2	(1) No. 5 Florida State; Semifinal	W 3–2	20–4–1	Sahlen's Stadium (10,000); Cary, NC
December 5; 6:00 p.m., ESPNU	(2) No. 2	(1) No. 1 UCLA; Final	L 2–3 ^{2OT}	20–5–1	Sahlen's Stadium (9,531); Cary, NC
*Non-conference game. ^{#}Rankings from United Soccer Coaches. (#) Tournament seedings in parentheses. All times are in Eastern.

== Awards and honors ==
Recipient	Award	Date	Ref.
Maycee Bell	Pre-Season All-ACC Team	August 11	
Sam Meza	Pre-Season All-ACC Team	August 11	
Maycee Bell	Pre-Season Hermann Trophy Watchlist	August 18	
Tori Hansen	ACC Defensive Player of the Week	August 23	
Sam Meza	ACC Defensive Player of the Week	September 13	
Tori Hansen	ACC Defensive Player of the Week	October 18	
Ally Sentnor	ACC Co-offensive Player of the Week	October 25	
Sam Meza	All ACC-First Team	November 2	
Ally Sentnor	All ACC-First Team	November 2	
Tori Hansen	All ACC-First Team	November 2	
Avery Patterson	All ACC-Second Team	November 2	
Tessa Dellarose	All ACC-Third Team	November 2	
Maddie Dahlien	ACC All-Freshman Team	November 2	
Tessa Dellarose	ACC All-Freshman Team	November 2	
Emily Moxley	All-ACC Tournament team	November 6	
Avery Patterson	All-ACC Tournament team	November 6	
Tori Hansen	All-ACC Tournament team	November 6	

== Rankings ==
Ranking movements Legend: ██ Increase in ranking ██ Decrease in ranking т = Tied with team above or below ( ) = First-place votes
	Week																
Poll	Pre	1	2	3	4	5	6	7	8	9	10	11	12	13	14	15	Final
United Soccer	10	1 (8)	1 (8)	2	2	3	3	5	2т	2	2	2	Not released				2
TopDrawer Soccer	8	4	3	3	3	4	4	5	5	5	3	3	4	4	4	4	2

== 2023 NWSL Draft ==
Player	Team	Round	Pick #	Position
Tori Hansen	Orlando Pride	3	25	DF
