= Ran Iwai =

Japanese footballer (born 2002)

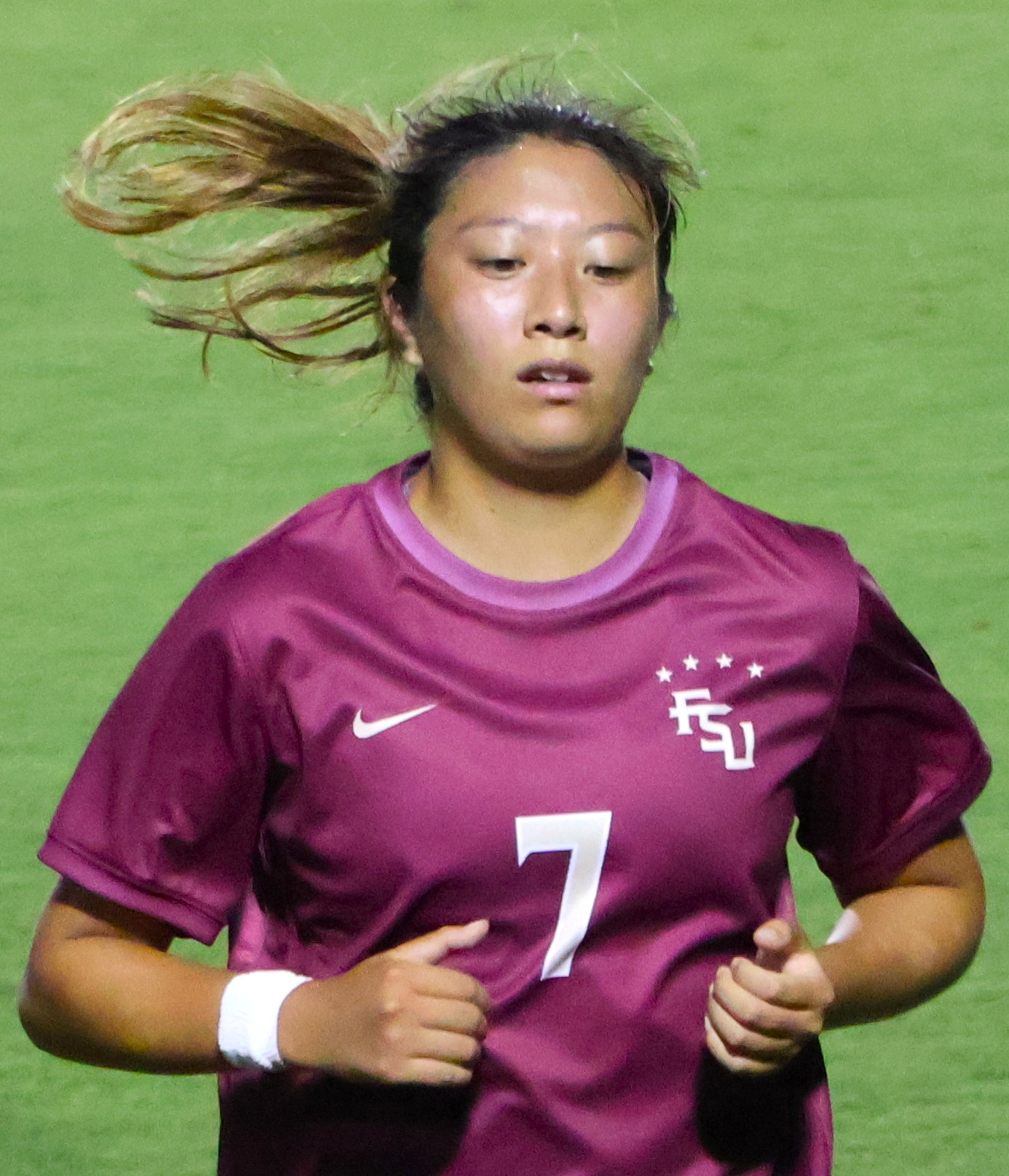
- Iwai with Florida State in 2024

Personal information
- Date of birth: 29 March 2002 (age 24)
- Place of birth: Tokyo, Japan
- Height: 5 ft 3 in (1.60 m)
- Positions: Left back; midfielder

Team information
- Current team: FC Rosengård
- Number: 15

Youth career
- 2014–2019: JFA Academy Fukushima

College career
| Years | Team | Apps | (Gls) |
| 2020–2024 | Florida State Seminoles | 100 | (4) |

Senior career*
| Years | Team | Apps | (Gls) |
| 2026– | FC Rosengård | 0 | (0) |

International career
- Japan U-16
| 2018 | Japan U-17 | 2 | (0) |
- * Club domestic league appearances and goals

Ran Iwai (岩井蘭, Iwai Ran; born 29 March 2002) is a Japanese professional footballer who plays as a left back or midfielder for Damallsvenskan club FC Rosengård. She played college soccer for the Florida State Seminoles, winning two national championships (2021 and 2023) and five consecutive ACC tournament titles. She represented Japan at the 2018 FIFA U-17 Women's World Cup.

== Early life ==
Iwai was born in Tokyo. She started out playing flag football (her father was coach of the men's national team), winning the under-12 national championship in the sport. She also ran track at that age and was the anchor for the national champions in the 4 × 100 meter relay. She then joined the association football set-up at JFA Academy Fukushima, scoring 177 goals in six years with the program. Before her senior year in high school, she went overseas to summer camp at Florida State University, where she was offered an athletic scholarship. She learned English growing up.

== College career ==
Iwai played in all 16 games and scored 1 goal for the Florida State Seminoles as a freshman in 2020 (part of the season was held in the spring of 2021 due to the coronavirus pandemic). She helped the Seminoles reach the national championship game, losing to Santa Clara on penalties. She scored 2 goals in 19 appearances as a sophomore in the fall of 2021. In the NCAA tournament semifinals, she made a rare start in the win against Rutgers, before winning the national title over BYU on penalties, the program's third national championship. Iwai became a greater contributor and started every game at left back in her junior year in 2022, helping record 11 shutouts in 23 games. She scored 1 goal during the NCAA tournament as the Seminoles reached the semifinals, losing to North Carolina.

Iwai started every game in her senior year in 2023, posting 8 assists and contributing to 14 shutouts in 23 games as the Seminoles became undefeated national champions. She helped Florida State post five consecutive clean sheets in the NCAA tournament before beating Stanford 5–1 in the final, winning the program's fourth national title. She returned for her fifth and final season in 2024, tallying 8 assists in 19 games. She suffered an injury in the ACC tournament final that kept her out for the rest of the season. Despite her injury, Florida State won the match to give Iwai her fifth consecutive ACC tournament title, joining Clara Robbins as the only Seminoles to win five conference tournaments.

== Club career ==
Following a year of anterior cruciate ligament (ACL) recovery, Iwai joined Swedish club FC Rosengård in February 2026. She made her professional debut and return from injury on February 14, starting at left back in a 1–1 draw against Vittsjö GIK in the Swedish Cup.

== International career ==
Iwai represented the Japan under-16 team at the 2017 AFC U-16 Women's Championship, where they came in third place. She was later a captain for the under-17 team. She made the roster for the 2018 FIFA U-17 Women's World Cup and appeared as a substitute in a 6–0 victory over South Africa in the group stage.

== Personal life ==
Iwai is the daughter of Ayako and Ayumu Iwai. Her father is the head coach of the Japan men's national flag football team. Her younger brother, Ray, plays college football at New Mexico.

== Honors ==
Florida State Seminoles

- NCAA Division I women's soccer tournament: 2021, 2023
- ACC women's soccer tournament: 2020, 2021, 2022, 2023, 2024
- Atlantic Coast Conference: 2020, 2022, 2023
