= 2020 NCAA Division I women's soccer championship game =

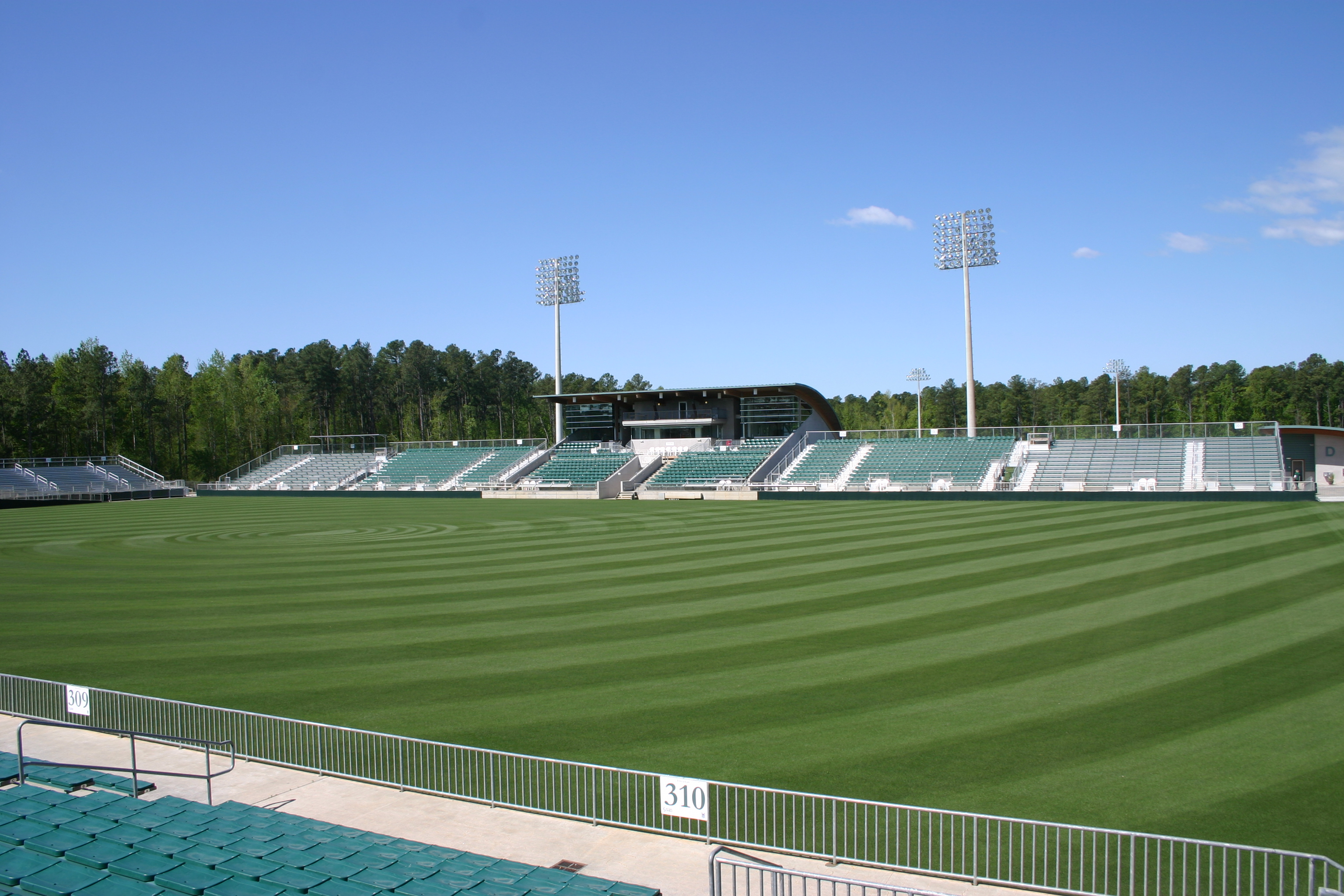
- WakeMed Soccer Park hosted the match
- Event: 2020 NCAA Division I women's soccer tournament
Florida State	Santa Clara
ACC	WCC
1	1
- after extra time Santa Clara won 4–1 on penalties
- Date: 17 May 2021
- Venue: WakeMed Soccer Park, Cary, NC
- Referee: Christina Unkel
- Attendance: 5,000

The 2020 NCAA Division I women's soccer championship game (also known as the 2020 NCAA Division I Women's College Cup) was played on 17 May 2021 at WakeMed Soccer Park in Cary, North Carolina, and determined the winner of the 2020 NCAA Division I women's soccer tournament, the national collegiate women's soccer championship in the United States. This was the 39th. edition of this tournament organised by the NCAA. As many other competitions in the country, the tournament had been delayed due to the COVID-19 pandemic in the United States.

The match featured Florida State University, which played its 5th. final, and Santa Clara University, which made its 2nd. appearance in the final. After both teams drew 1–1 at the end of regulation and the draw persisted on 20' extra time, Santa Clara defeated Florida State 4–1 on penalties to win its second NCAA women's national title and the first since 2001.

== Road to the final ==
The NCAA Division I women's soccer tournament, sometimes known as the College Cup, is an American intercollegiate soccer tournament conducted by the National Collegiate Athletic Association (NCAA), and determines the Division I women's national champion. The tournament has been formally held since 1982, when it was a twelve-team tournament.

Florida State (ACC)		Round	Santa Clara (WCC)	
Opponent	Result	NCAA Tournament	Opponent	Result
Bye	–	First round	Bye	–
Milwaukee (HL)	3–0 (H)	Second round	Ohio State (Big 10)	4–1 (A)
Penn State (Big 10)	3–1 (H)	Third round	Arkansas (SEC)	2–0 (A)
Duke (ACC)	0–0 (5–3 p) (H)	Quarterfinal	Clemson (ACC)	1–0 (A)
Virginia (ACC)	0–0 (3–0 p) (H)	Semifinal	North Carolina (ACC)	3–1 (H)

== Match details ==
May 17, 2021
5:30 p.m. EDT

Florida State	1–1 (a.e.t.)	Santa Clara
Nighswonger 62'	Report	Turnbow 83'
Penalties
Robbins (penalty missed); Madril (penalty missed); Carle (penalty scored)	1–4	(penalty scored) Doyle; (penalty scored) Menti; (penalty scored) Turnbow; (penalty scored) D'Aquila

WakeMed Soccer Park, Cary, North Carolina
Attendance: 5,000
Referee: Christina Unkel

Florida State
Santa Clara

GK	1	(Puerto Rico) Cristina Roque
DF	16	(Canada) Gabrielle Carle
DF	25	(United States) Emily Madril
MF	6	(United States) Jaelin Howell	(yellow card) 106'
MF	8	(United States) Lauren Flynn	(yellow card) 106'
MF	11	(United States) Kirsten Pavlisko
MF	26	(United States) Clara Robbins		(substituted off) 34' (substituted in) 45' (substituted off) 75' (substituted in) 83' (substituted off) 89' (substituted in) 90'
MF	33	(China) Zhao Yujie	(yellow card) 106'	(substituted off) 14' (substituted in) 16' (substituted off) 34' (substituted in) 45' (substituted off) 83' (substituted in) 89'
FW	2	(United States) Jenna Nighswonger		(substituted off) 38' (substituted in) 45'
FW	13	(United States) Leilanni Nesbeth		(substituted off) 21' (substituted in) 45' (substituted in) 59'
FW	20	(United States) Kristen McFarland		(substituted off) 42' (substituted in) 45'
Substitutions:
FW	4	(United States) Kristina Lynch	(yellow card) 78'	(substituted in) 38' (substituted off) 45' (substituted in) 75' (substituted off) 90'
MF	7	(Japan) Ran Iwai		(substituted in) 34' (substituted off) 45'
FW	10	(Jamaica) Jody Brown		(substituted in) 14' (substituted off) 16' (substituted in) 21' (substituted off) 45' (substituted in) 59' (substituted off) 82'
FW	12	(Republic of Ireland) Heather Payne		(substituted in) 34' (substituted off) 45' (substituted in) 82'
DF	21	(United States) Gianna Mitchell		(substituted in) 42' (substituted off) 45'
Head Coach:
(United States) Mark Krikorian

GK	1	(United States) Marlee Nicolos
DF	2	(United States) Eden White
DF	14	(United States) Marisa Bubnis		(substituted off) 82' (substituted in) 89'
DF	25	(Japan) Makoto Nezu	(yellow card) 24'
MF	4	(United States) Skylar Smith		(substituted off) 64' (substituted in) 70' (substituted off) 78'
MF	8	(Israel) Keren Goor
MF	22	(United States) Alex Loera	(yellow card) 50'
FW	9	(United States) Izzy D'Aquila
FW	10	(United States) Kelsey Turnbow		(substituted off) 32' (substituted in) 45' (substituted off) 59' (substituted in) 64'
FW	13	(United States) Julie Doyle		(substituted off) 70' (substituted in) 78'
FW	24	(United States) Sally Menti
Substitutions:
FW	11	(United States) Kaile Halvorsen		(substituted in) 32' (substituted off) 45' (substituted in) 59'
DF	30	(United States) Emma Reeves		(substituted in) 82' (substituted off) 89'
Head Coach:
(United States) Jerry Smith

College Cup MVP
Offensive: Kelsey Turnbow
Defensive: Alex Loera

Assistant referees:
Sam Bilbo (United States)
Rachel Smith (United States)
Fourth official:
n/a (United States)

Match rules:

- 90 minutes.
- 20 minutes of extra time if necessary.
- Penalty shoot-out if scores still level.
- Unlimited substitutes, may not return if subbed out in the first half; may return unlimited times in the second half.

=== Statistics ===
Overall
	Florida State	Santa Clara
Goals scored	1	1
Total shots	8	6
Offsides	3	1
Saves	1	1
Corner kicks	7	1
Offsides	3	1
Yellow cards	4	2
Red cards	0	0
