= Tori Hansen =

American soccer player (born 2001)

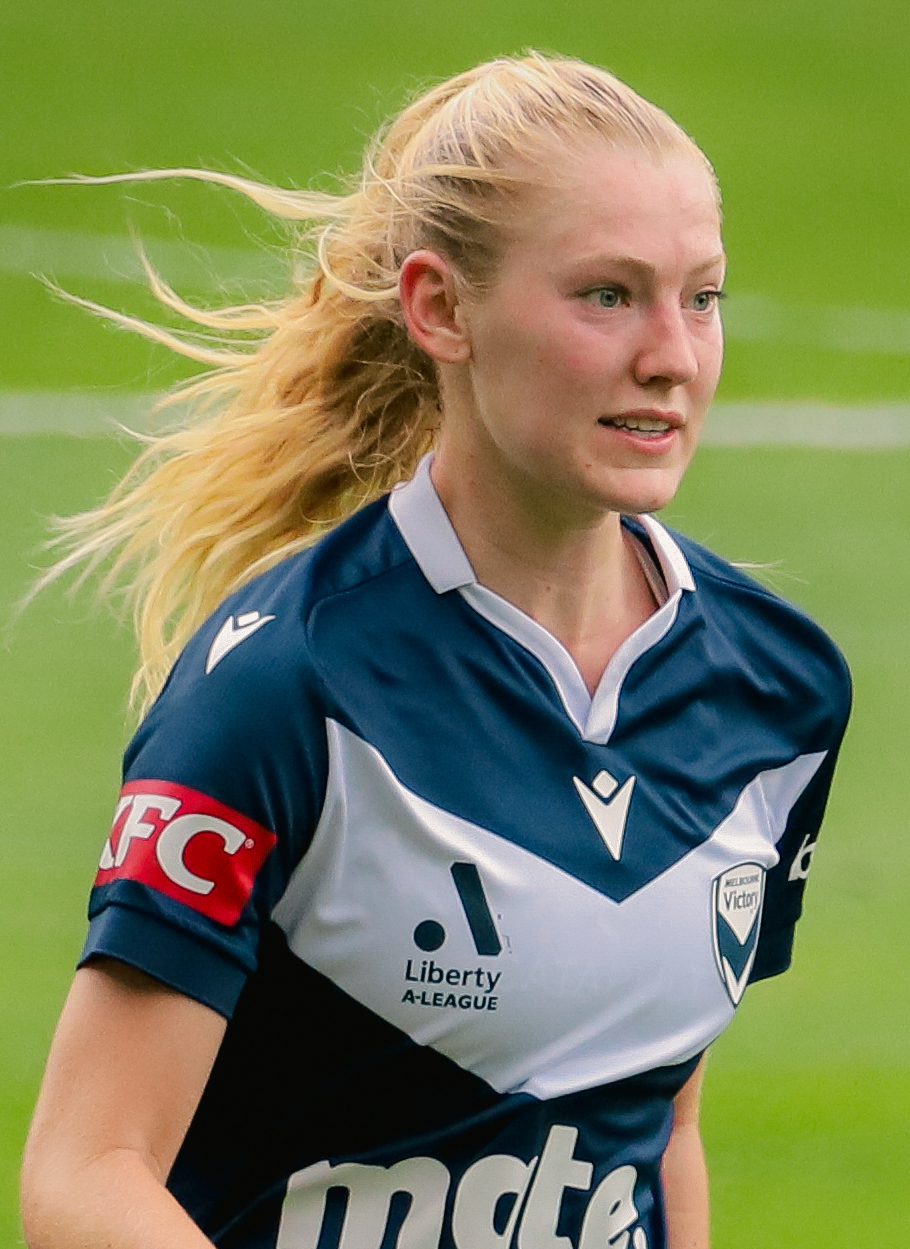
- Hansen playing for Melbourne Victory, December 2023

Personal information
- Full name: Tori Elizabeth Hansen
- Date of birth: January 14, 2001 (age 25)
- Place of birth: Raleigh, North Carolina, United States
- Height: 5 ft 10 in (1.78 m)
- Position: Defender

Team information
- Current team: Sparta Prague
- Number: 16

Youth career
- CASL
- North Carolina Courage

College career
Years	Team	Apps	(Gls)
2019–2022	North Carolina Tar Heels	65	(9)

Senior career*
Years	Team	Apps	(Gls)
2023–2024	Orlando Pride	0	(0)
2023–2024	→ Melbourne Victory (loan)	19	(2)
2024–2025	Brooklyn FC	7	(0)
2025–	Sparta Prague	17	(3)

International career^{‡}
2015–2016	United States U15	10	
2017–2018	United States U17	12	(2)
2018	United States U20	1	(0)
- * Club domestic league appearances and goals as of May 26, 2026 ‡ National team caps and goals as of December 9, 2018

Tori Elizabeth Hansen (born January 14, 2001) is an American professional soccer player who plays as a defender for Czech Women's First League club Sparta Prague. Internationally, she has represented the United States at multiple youth levels.

== Early life ==
Born in Raleigh, North Carolina, Hansen first began playing recreational club soccer for an under-5 side in the local Capital Area Soccer League (CASL). She progressed through the CASL age groups before joining the North Carolina Courage U.S. Soccer Development Academy at under-17 level and captained the team. In July 2018, she was one of two academy players rostered by the club's senior team for the exhibition 2018 Women's International Champions Cup and was an unused substitute for both games. She attended Wakefield High School and played two seasons of soccer in which she had 24 goals and 11 assists, and was named 2017 conference player of the year and United Soccer Coaches youth girls All-America. As a freshman she competed in high jump, 400 meters and 800 meters. She also played varsity basketball as a sophomore and senior under coach Donald Williams.

== College career ==
Hansen, a two-time team captain, played four seasons of college soccer for the North Carolina Tar Heels from 2019 to 2022 while majoring in business administration at UNC-Chapel Hill. As a freshman she was limited to six appearances as North Carolina won the Atlantic Coast Conference (ACC) regular season and 2019 ACC Tournament. The team also reached the 2019 Women's College Cup final. North Carolina lost in a penalty shootout with Hansen taking the sixth penalty. As a sophomore she appeared in all 20 games of the season including two starts. She scored one goal, the first of her collegiate career, in a 1–0 win over Washington in the third round of the 2020 College Cup. She made a further 13 appearances in 2021 but did not start. Having spent the previous three years mostly filling in as a reserve midfielder, Hansen had a breakout year during her senior season, starting all 26 games at center-back scoring 8 goals (5–5 on penalty kicks). She anchored a back line that led the conference in shutouts with 14 while also scoring seven goals. The team reached the 2022 Women's College Cup, the first time since 2019, but finished runners-up again after losing 3–2 in overtime to UCLA. Individually Hansen was a Honda Award finalist, named College Soccer News All-America First Team, NCAA.com Best XI, All-ACC First Team, NCAA All-Tournament Team, ACC All-Tournament Team and United Soccer Coaches All-America Second Team. She also was the UNC 2022 Player of the Year and Defensive MVP and won both the Ashley Riggs Connection Award and Coaches Award.

== Club career ==
=== Orlando Pride ===
On January 12, 2023, Hansen was selected in the third round (25th overall) of the 2023 NWSL Draft by Orlando Pride. The pick was one of those acquired in the trade of Ashlyn Harris and Ali Krieger. She was signed to a one-year contract with an additional option year on March 29, 2023. Hansen made her professional debut on April 19, playing the full 90 minutes of a 1–1 draw with North Carolina Courage in the 2023 NWSL Challenge Cup. She scored her first goal on her second appearance, in a 4–2 defeat to Washington Spirit in the same competition on May 10.

==== Melbourne Victory ====
On September 12, 2023, Orlando announced Hansen had signed a one-year contract extension. Having only made two appearances for Orlando, Hansen joined Australian A-League team Melbourne Victory on loan for the 2023–24 season. She made 20 appearances for Melbourne Victory, scoring two goals as the team finished in 4th-place, qualifying for the postseason before being eliminated in the first round by Central Coast Mariners on penalties. Following the conclusion of her loan spell with Melbourne Victory in April 2024, Hansen was waived by Orlando Pride.

=== Brooklyn ===
In July 2024, Hansen joined Brooklyn FC ahead of their inaugural USL Super League season. She made 7 appearances before departing the club after one year of service.

=== Sparta Prague ===
On 9 August 2025, Hansen signed a contract with Czech Women's First League club Sparta Prague. Hansen made her league debut on August 16, playing the full 90 minutes of a 3–1 away win against Viktoria Plzeň. She scored her first goal on her fourth appearance, in a 7–0 away win against Lokomotiva Brno H. H. in the same competition on September 20. On 27 April 2026, Hansen signed a new contract with Sparta Prague. In her first season with the team, she helped Sparta win their first league title in five years. Sparta also won their eleventh Czech Women's Cup, beating Slavia Prague 0–0 (4–3 pen) in the final.

== International career ==
Hansen has represented the United States internationally at multiple youth levels. She was first called up for an under-15 training camp in 2015. In 2016, she was part of the winning team at the 2016 CONCACAF Girls' U-15 Championship. In 2017 and 2018, Hansen appeared for the under-17s in multiple youth tournaments and friendlies including Italy's invitational Torneo Femminile Delle Nazioni, the CFA International U-16 Women's Football Tournament in China and Copa Provincia de Buenos Aires in Argentina. In December 2018, Hansen appeared at under-20 level, helping the United States beat China 1–0 at the Nike International friendlies.

== Personal life ==
Several of Hansen's family have also played collegiate sport. She has one brother, Trey, who played baseball with NJCAA program Wake Tech. Her father, Dane, played volleyball at Colorado State and UC Santa Barbara before a five-year professional beach volleyball career on the AVP. Her great-grandfather, Bill Goertz, played college basketball and captained the Southern Branch Cubs.

== Career statistics ==
=== College summary ===
Team	Season	ACC regular season			ACC Tournament		NCAA Tournament		Total	
Team	Season	Division	Apps	Goals	Apps	Goals	Apps	Goals	Apps	Goals
North Carolina Tar Heels	2019	ACC	3	0	0	0	3	0	6	0
North Carolina Tar Heels	2020–21	ACC	13	0	3	0	4	1	20	1
North Carolina Tar Heels	2021	ACC	12	0	—		1	0	13	0
North Carolina Tar Heels	2022	ACC	18	7	2	0	6	1	26	8
Total			46	7	5	0	14	2	65	9

=== Club summary ===
As of July 15, 2025

Club	Season	League			Cup (Note: Includes the NWSL Challenge Cup)		Playoffs (Note: Includes NWSL Playoffs and A-League Finals)		Total	
Club	Season	Division	Apps	Goals	Apps	Goals	Apps	Goals	Apps	Goals
Orlando Pride	2023	NWSL	0	0	2	1	—		2	1
Melbourne Victory (loan)	2023–24	A-League	19	2	—		1	0	20	2
Brooklyn FC	2024–25	USL Super League	7	0	—		—		7	0
Career total			26	2	2	1	1	0	29	3

== Honors ==
Sparta Prague

- Czech Women's First League: 2025–26
- Czech Women's Cup: 2026

North Carolina Tar Heels

- Atlantic Coast Conference regular season: 2019, 2020, 2022
- ACC Tournament: 2019
- NCAA Women's College Cup runner-up: 2019, 2022

United States U15

- CONCACAF Girls' Under-15 Championship: 2016
