= Tessa Dellarose =

American soccer player (born 2004)

- Dellarose with the Chicago Stars in 2026

Personal information
- Full name: Tessa Elise Dellarose
- Date of birth: April 2, 2004 (age 22)
- Place of birth: Pittsburgh, Pennsylvania, U.S.
- Height: 5 ft 5 in (1.65 m)
- Positions: Left back; defensive midfielder

Team information
- Current team: Chicago Stars
- Number: 34

College career
Years	Team	Apps	(Gls)
2022–2025	North Carolina Tar Heels	89	(6)

Senior career*
Years	Team	Apps	(Gls)
2022–2024	Racing Louisville (USL W)	10	(2)
2025	Pittsburgh Riveters	6	(1)
2026–	Chicago Stars	23	(2)

International career^{‡}
2023–2024	United States U-20	8	(1)
- * Club domestic league appearances and goals as of 05:48, November 2, 2026 (UTC) ‡ National team caps and goals as of April 7, 2024

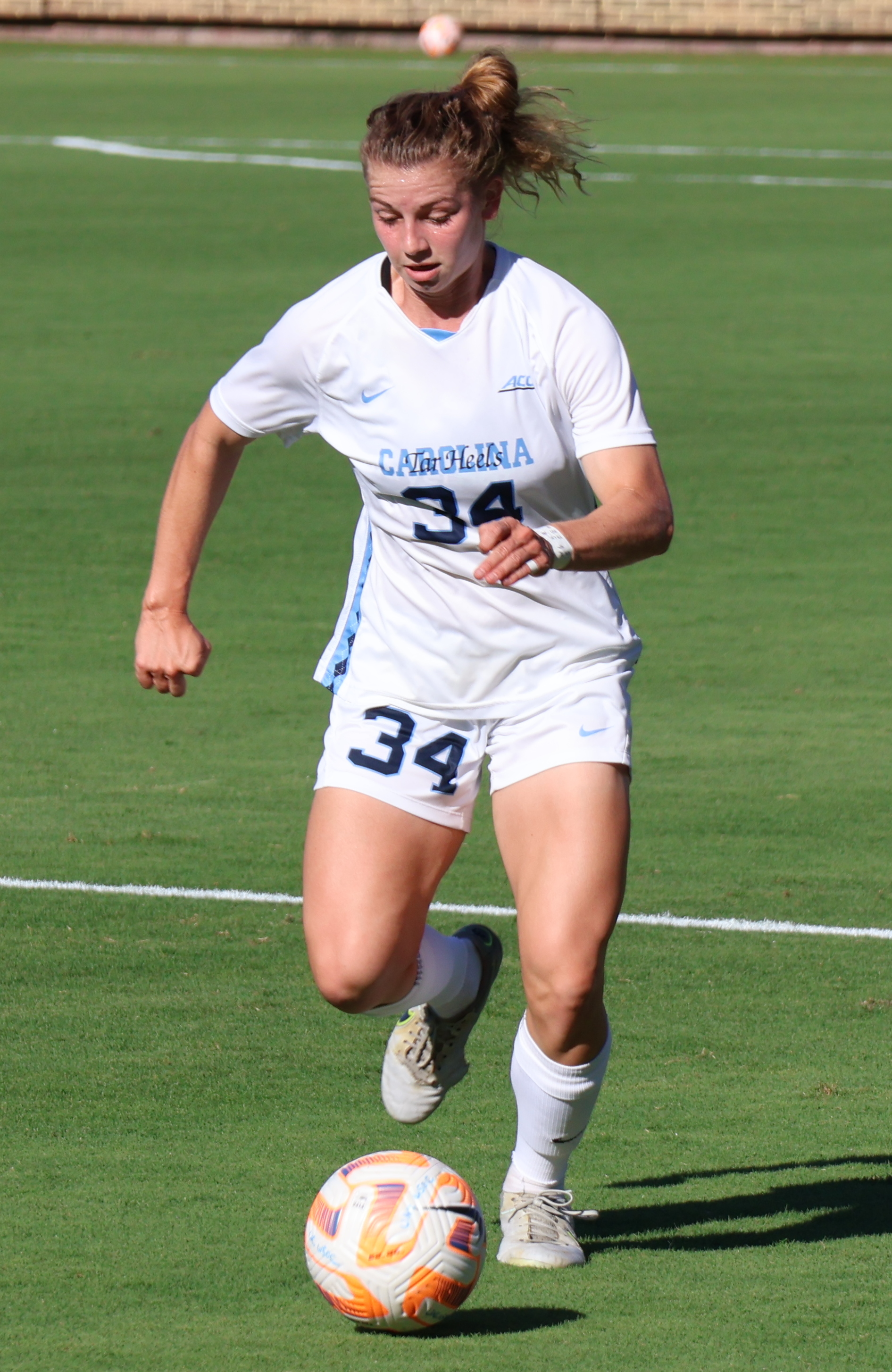
Dellarose with North Carolina in 2023

Tessa Elise Dellarose (born April 2, 2004) is an American professional soccer player who plays as a defensive midfielder or left back for Chicago Stars FC of the National Women's Soccer League (NWSL). She played college soccer for the North Carolina Tar Heels, winning the national championship and earning All-American honors in 2024. She has represented the United States at the youth international level.

== Early life ==
Dellarose was born in Pittsburgh, Pennsylvania, to Melinda and Ron Dellarose, and has two older siblings, Colton and Talia. Her father played college baseball at Duquesne. Dellarose was raised in Grindstone, Pennsylvania. She played three seasons of high school soccer at Brownsville High School, where she became captain and set a school record with 108 career goals. She committed to the University of North Carolina as a sophomore. She sat out her senior high school season to focus on her Pittsburgh Riverhounds academy team and the youth national team.

== College career ==
On her first day of preseason training with the North Carolina Tar Heels in 2022, Dellarose set a team record in the beep test (multi-stage fitness test) by reaching level 57, a mark she surpassed the next year at 63. Primarily a defensive midfielder, she also played left back for the Tar Heels. She started almost every game as a freshman in 2022, earning third-team All-ACC honors, and helped the team reach the national title game, losing to UCLA.

After mostly playing off the bench as a sophomore in 2023, Dellarose returned to the starting lineup as a junior in 2024, playing the second-most field minutes on the team as co-captain. She recorded career highs with four goals and a team-joint-high seven assists, earning third-team All-ACC and fourth-team All-American honors. In the NCAA tournament, she scored the last-minute winner in the 1–0 second round win over Santa Clara and assisted Kate Faasse's golden goal from a corner kick in the quarterfinal 2–1 win against Penn State. North Carolina won 1–0 against Wake Forest in the final, winning their 23rd national title and first since 2012.

Dellarose missed five games as a senior after tearing the quadriceps tendon in her left leg over the summer before returning to the field as co-captain in 2025. Unseeded in the NCAA tournament, the Tar Heels went to the third round before losing TCU on penalties, though Dellarose made hers. She finished her college career with 89 games played, 63 started, and 6 goals.

During her college years, Dellarose played in the USL W League for Racing Louisville in 2022 and 2024 and joined the newly formed Pittsburgh Riveters in 2025. She also represented the US Women–sponsored team in the Soccer Tournament 2024. She scored the winning goal in the final game and was named the tournament's most valuable player.

== Club career ==
Chicago Stars FC announced on January 17, 2026, that they had signed Dellarose to her first professional contract on a three-year deal. She made her professional debut in the season opener on March 15, playing 18 minutes off the bench in a 4–0 defeat to Angel City FC. The following week, she made her first start and scored her first professional goal in the 42nd minute of a 2–1 win over the Kansas City Current on March 22.

== International career ==
Dellarose was called into training camp with the United States national under-16 team in 2020 and the under-20 team the following year. She appeared in all five games at the 2023 CONCACAF Women's U-20 Championship, where the United States finished runners-up.

== Honors and awards ==
North Carolina Tar Heels

- NCAA Division I women's soccer tournament: 2024
- Atlantic Coast Conference: 2022

Individual

- Fourth-team All-American: 2024
- Third-team All-ACC: 2022, 2024
