= Cristina Roque =

Puerto Rican footballer (born 2001)

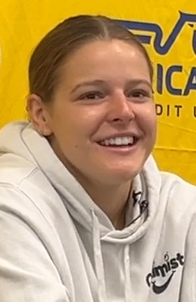
- Roque with the Utah Royals in 2024

Personal information
- Full name: Cristina Isabel Roque
- Date of birth: November 6, 2001 (age 25)
- Place of birth: Winter Garden, Florida, U.S.
- Height: 1.70 m (5 ft 7 in)
- Position: Goalkeeper

Team information
- Current team: Tampa Bay Sun (on loan from Racing Louisville)
- Number: 1

College career
Years	Team	Apps	(Gls)
2020–2023	Florida State Seminoles	67	(0)

Senior career*
Years	Team	Apps	(Gls)
2018–2019	Florida Krush	2	(0)
2024–2025	Utah Royals	1	(0)
2025–	Racing Louisville	0	(0)
2026	→ Sporting JAX (loan)	0	(0)
2026–	→ Tampa Bay Sun (loan)	7	(0)

International career^{‡}
2018	Puerto Rico U17	2	(0)
2020	Puerto Rico U20	4	(0)
2019–	Puerto Rico	2	(0)
- * Club domestic league appearances and goals as of 00:47, 7 November 2026 (UTC) ‡ National team caps and goals as of March 1, 2020

Cristina Isabel Roque (born November 6, 2001) is a professional footballer who plays as a goalkeeper for USL Super League club Tampa Bay Sun FC, on loan from Racing Louisville FC of the National Women's Soccer League (NWSL). Born in the mainland United States, she plays for the Puerto Rico national team. She played college soccer for the Florida State Seminoles, where she won the 2021 and 2023 national championships.

== Early life and college career ==
Roque was born and raised in Winter Garden, Florida. Her father was born in Santurce, San Juan, Puerto Rico.

=== Florida State Seminoles ===
Roque played four years for the Florida State Seminoles from 2020 to 2023. In her pandemic-shortened freshman season, she helped lead Florida State to the national title game but lost to Santa Clara on penalties. She faced the same situation the following year and saved two of BYU's penalty attempts to secure the 2021 national championship for Florida State. After sharing regular-season duties with goalkeeper Mia Justus during her sophomore and junior years, Roque played every game of Florida State's 2023 undefeated national champion season. She finished her college career with 59 wins, 6 draws, and 2 losses in 67 appearances (with 36 shutouts). She was a three-time All-Atlantic Coast Conference selection (once first-team), two-time United Soccer Coaches third-team All-American, and the ACC goalkeeper of the year in 2022. During college, Roque signed a name, image, and likeness (NIL) deal with Advantage Goalkeeping, which produced custom goalkeeper gloves for women featuring her logo.

== Club career ==
=== Utah Royals ===
Roque was drafted by expansion team Utah Royals 33rd overall in the third round of the 2024 NWSL Draft. She was signed to a one-year contract with an option to extend an additional year. Primarily a backup to Mandy Haught during her rookie season, she debuted on July 20 against the Seattle Reign in the first round of the NWSL x Liga MX Femenil Summer Cup. She played her first regular-season game on September 14, starting in a 1–0 win against Racing Louisville.

=== Racing Louisville ===
On June 4, 2025, Roque was traded to Racing Louisville FC in exchange for $50,000 in allocation money. She subsequently signed a new contract with Louisville to retain her through 2026.

On January 13, 2026, Louisville sent Roque out on loan to USL Super League club Sporting JAX through May 2026. She did not make any appearances for Sporting JAX in her half-season loan stint.

In August 2026, Racing Louisville loaned Roque out to the Super League once again, this time to Tampa Bay Sun FC through the end of the calendar year.

== Honours ==
Florida State Seminoles

- NCAA Division I Women's Soccer Championship: 2021, 2023

Individual

- Atlantic Coast Conference Goalkeeper of the Year: 2022
