= Talia Staude =

American soccer player (born 2001)

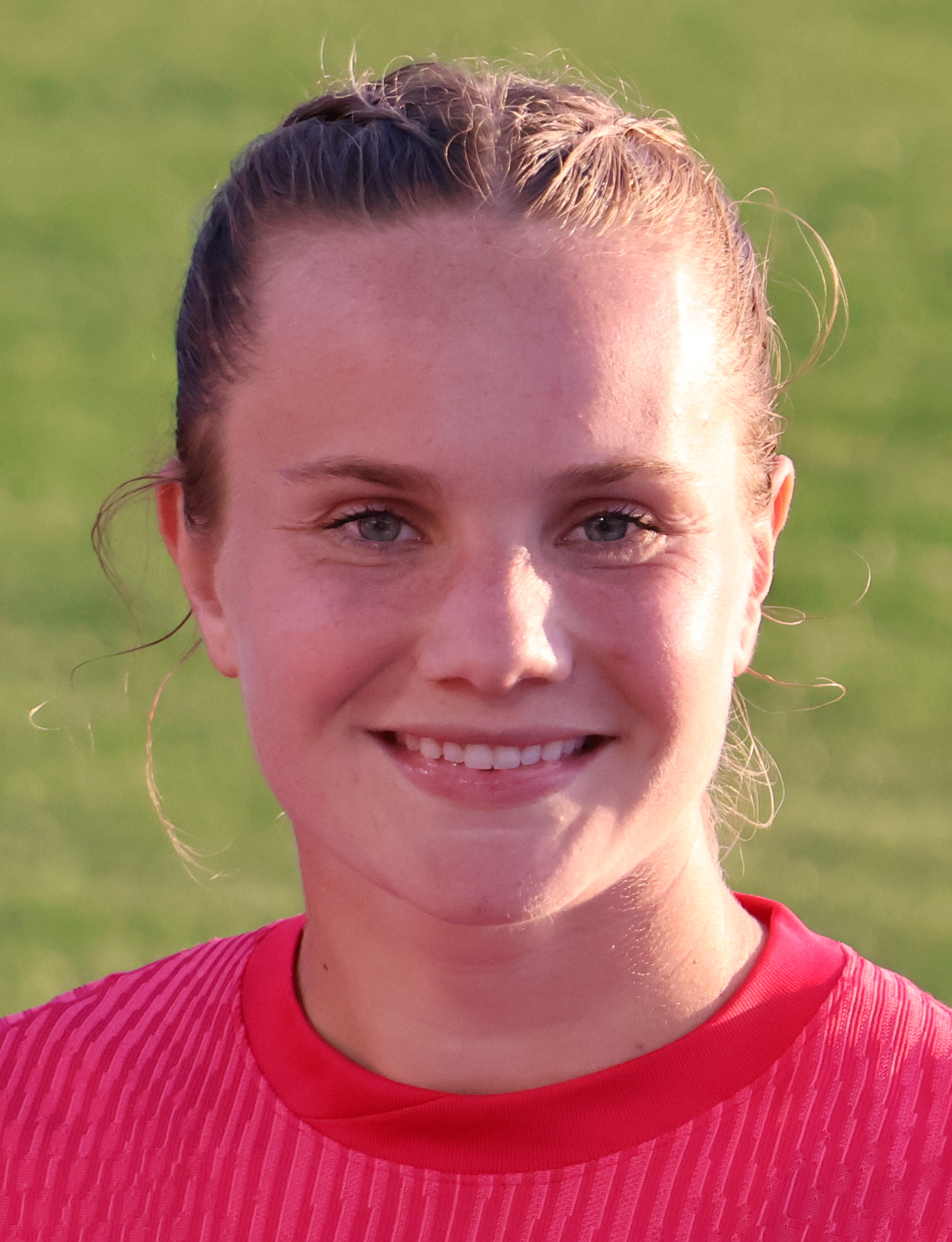
- Staude with the North Carolina Courage in 2025

Personal information
- Full name: Natalia Alyse Staude
- Date of birth: April 30, 2001 (age 25)
- Place of birth: Grand Rapids, Michigan, U.S.
- Height: 5 ft 7 in (1.70 m)
- Position: Defender

Team information
- Current team: North Carolina Courage
- Number: 12

Youth career
- Tophat SC

College career
Years	Team	Apps	(Gls)
2019–2023	Virginia Cavaliers	103	(6)

Senior career*
Years	Team	Apps	(Gls)
2024–	North Carolina Courage	30	(1)
2024	→ Tampa Bay Sun (loan)	12	(1)

International career
2017–2018	United States U-17	17	(0)
2019	United States U-20	4	(0)
- * Club domestic league appearances and goals as of 06:58, November 8, 2026 (UTC)

Natalia Alyse Staude (/ˈstaʊdi/ STOW-dee; born April 30, 2001) is an American professional soccer player who plays as a defender for the North Carolina Courage of the National Women's Soccer League (NWSL). She played college soccer for the Virginia Cavaliers and was drafted by the Courage in the second round of the 2024 NWSL Draft. Internationally, she represented the United States at the youth level, winning CONCACAF championships at the under-15 and under-17 levels and appearing at the 2018 FIFA U-17 Women's World Cup.

== Early life ==
Staude was born in Grand Rapids, Michigan, to Alisa and Greg Staude, and has a younger sister, Kiera. Her family moved to Atlanta, Georgia, when she was an infant. Her mother and grandfather played college basketball; her sister plays college soccer at Georgia.

Staude played high school soccer for the Westminster Schools, a private school in Atlanta, and helped the school win three GHSA titles; she missed her junior season while playing for her club team. She was named United Soccer Coaches All-American in 2017 and 2018. She scored eight goals as a senior in 2018–19 and was named The Atlanta Journal-Constitution's Girls' Soccer Player of the Year and All-American by TopDrawerSoccer. She played club soccer for Tophat Soccer Club. She also lettered in high school basketball and swimming. She committed to Virginia as a sophomore.

== College career ==
Staude became a starter for the Virginia Cavaliers during her freshman season in 2019, playing in all 22 games and starting the last 15. She helped Virginia reach the final of the ACC tournament and earn a one seed in the NCAA tournament, earning TopDrawerSoccer Freshman Best XI honors. She played in 18 games, all but one as a starter, as a sophomore in 2020. She scored her first college goal in the first round of the NCAA tournament and played every minute of the tournament as Virginia reached the semifinals. She started all 23 games for the Cavaliers in her junior season in 2021, with her second career goal coming as the 90th-minute game winner against NC State. Virginia went undefeated in conference play to win the ACC regular-season title, made the ACC final, and earned a top seed in the NCAA tournament.

Staude started all 23 games in her senior season in 2022, playing every minute of all but three of them. She scored in the first round of the NCAA tournament as Virginia made the quarterfinals, losing to eventual champions UCLA. She returned to play a fifth graduate season in 2023 (with an extra year of eligibility due to the COVID-19 pandemic). She started all 17 games and scored a career-high 3 goals, including a goal in her final college game against Syracuse. She played 103 games for the Cavaliers, second-most in program history.

== Club career ==
The North Carolina Courage selected Staude 24th overall in the second round of the 2024 NWSL Draft, the team's highest pick of the night. She was signed to a three-year contract.

On August 20, 2024, the Courage announced that Staude would be loaned to the Tampa Bay Sun of the new USL Super League for the rest of the year. She made her professional debut four days later, coming on as a second-half substitute against DC Power FC. On September 8, in her first start, she scored and assisted Carlee Giammona in a 3–2 victory over Lexington SC. She featured primarily at right back in 12 appearances (10 starts) for the Sun, who went on to win the inaugural USL Super League title.

Staude made her Courage and NWSL debut on March 29, 2025, starting at left back and playing the full 0–0 draw against the Portland Thorns. In late April, Courage head coach Sean Nahas refashioned the defense into a back three and made Staude a starter at left-sided center back for several weeks.

== International career ==
Staude was called into her first training camp with the youth national team at the under-14 level in June 2014. She played with the under-15 team in 2015 and 2016, winning the 2016 CONCACAF Girls' U-15 Championship. She trained with the under-17 team throughout 2017 and 2018. She recorded three assists in one game at the 2018 CONCACAF Women's U-17 Championship, a tournament the United States won, and played at the 2018 FIFA U-17 Women's World Cup. While in college, she played friendlies for the under-20 team in 2019. She played friendlies with the under-23 team against NWSL clubs in the preseasons of 2022 and 2023.

== Honors and awards ==
Tampa Bay Sun

- USL Super League: 2024–25

Virginia Cavaliers

- ACC regular-season championship: 2021

United States U-15

- CONCACAF Girls' U-15 Championship: 2016

United States U-17

- CONCACAF Women's U-17 Championship: 2018

Individual

- ACC tournament all-tournament team: 2021
