= 2025 Utah Royals season =

Utah Royals 2025 soccer season

Utah Royals
2025 season
- Owners: Ryan Smith; David Blitzer
- Sporting Director: Kelly Cousins
- Head coach: Jimmy Coenraets
- Stadium: America First Field; Sandy, Utah; (Capacity: 20,213)
- NWSL: 12th
- Top goalscorer: League: All: Mina Tanaka (6)
- Highest home attendance: 17,085 (Apr 18 vs CHI)
- Lowest home attendance: 5,051 (Apr 11 vs POR)
- Biggest win: 2–0 (2 times)
- Biggest defeat: 0–3 (2 times); 1–4 (Jun 21 vs RGN)
Home colors	Away colors
- All statistics correct as of 18:13, December 26, 2025 (UTC).

The 2025 Utah Royals season will be the team's fifth season of existence in the National Women's Soccer League (NWSL), the top tier of women's soccer in the United States. It will be the club's second season after returning to the league in 2024. The club plays its home games at America First Field in Sandy, Utah.

== Background ==
The Royals returned to the NWSL in 2024 following a three-year absence. Led by head coach Amy Rodriguez, the team had a slow start to the season that saw them at the bottom of the league table after the first half of the season. After a ten-game winless period, the club fired Rodriguez in late June and replaced her with interim head coach Jimmy Coenraets. Coenraets was promoted to a permanent role on October 24 after a more successful run of results and leading the Royals to a group victory in the 2024 NWSL x Liga MX Femenil Summer Cup. The team finished 11th overall at the end of the season, failing to qualify for the NWSL playoffs.

=== Preseason ===
The Royals kicked off their preseason by announcing their end-of-year roster decisions. The club listed Zoe Burns, Julia Grosso, Shaelan Murison, Darielle O'Brien, Carly Nelson, and Cameron Tucker as players who would not be returning in 2025. Additionally, forward Hannah Betfort was listed as another player out of contract who was in negotiations with the Royals. The next day, the club signed 15-year-old KK Ream using the NWSL Under-18 Entry Mechanism. Ream became the club's youngest signing, surpassing forward Ally Sentnor. The Royals went on to add two more players on December 18 and December 30, trading to acquire Alex Loera and signing former Texas Longhorns goalkeeper Mia Justus to her first professional contract.

Following the turn of the new year, the Royals took to re-signing their current players. On January 7, Paige Monaghan was extended for three years, while Mandy McGlynn signed a five-year contract two days later. On January 10, the Royals announced the signing of Colombian international Ana María Guzmán on loan from Bayern Munich for one season.

Meanwhile, former goalkeeper Carly Nelson spoke out against the Royals on social media, alleging that she was subjected to emotional and psychological abuse in her tenure with the club. The Royals caught wind of Nelson's statement and posted a response to her claims one day later.

On January 13, the Royals announced two incoming players and three outgoings. The club announced the release both Agnes Nyberg and Michele Vasconcelos after buying out their contracts, as well as the official departure of Hannah Betfort. Later, the Royals revealed the signings of forward Aisha Solórzano and Tatumn Milazzo to bolster their roster.

== Team ==
=== Current squad ===
As of December 26, 2025

No.	Nat.	Name	Date of birth (age)	Since	Previous team	Notes (Note: denotes a season-ending injury.)
Goalkeepers
1	(United States)	Mandy McGlynn	November 3, 1998 (aged 26)	2024	(United States) NJ/NY Gotham FC	—
23	(United States)	Mia Justus	September 3, 2002 (aged 22)	2025	(United States) Texas Longhorns	—
77	(United States)	DeAira Jackson	March 23, 2002 (aged 22)	2025	(United States) Orlando Pride	—
Defenders
2	(United States)	Tatumn Milazzo	April 17, 1998 (aged 26)	2025	(United States) Chicago Stars FC	
5	(United States)	Lauren Flynn	May 22, 2002 (aged 22)	2024	(United States) Florida State Seminoles	—
7	(Denmark)	Janni Thomsen	February 16, 2000 (aged 25)	2025	(Norway) Vålerenga	INT
8	(United States)	Kate Del Fava	July 23, 1998 (aged 26)	2024	(United States) Kansas City Current	—
14	(Spain)	Nuria Rábano	June 15, 1999 (aged 25)	2025	(Germany) VfL Wolfsburg	INT
15	(United States)	Lauren Gogal	July 15, 2003 (aged 21)	2025	(United States) Washington Spirit	—
16	(United States)	Madison Pogarch	November 5, 1997 (aged 27)	2024	(United States) San Diego Wave FC	—
17	(Spain)	Ana Tejada	June 2, 2002 (aged 22)	2024	(Spain) Real Sociedad	INT
18	(United States)	Kaleigh Riehl	October 21, 1996 (aged 28)	2024	(United States) San Diego Wave FC	—
28	(United States)	Imani Dorsey	March 21, 1996 (aged 28)	2024	(United States) NJ/NY Gotham FC	—
Midfielders
10	(Spain)	Claudia Zornoza	October 20, 1990 (aged 34)	2024	(Spain) Real Madrid	INT
12	(United States)	Alex Loera	June 19, 1999 (aged 25)	2025	(United States) Bay FC	
22	(Netherlands)	Dana Foederer	July 27, 2002 (aged 22)	2024	(Netherlands) Fortuna Sittard	INT
32	(United States)	Abby Boyan	August 24, 1999 (aged 25)	2025	(Iceland) Fylkir	—
33	(United States)	Aria Nagai	February 16, 2000 (aged 25)	2025	(United States) North Carolina Tar Heels	SCE
Forwards
4	(United States)	Paige Monaghan (captain)	November 13, 1996 (aged 28)	2024	(United States) Racing Louisville FC	—
9	(Slovenia)	Lara Prašnikar	August 8, 1998 (aged 26)	2025	(Germany) Eintracht Frankfurt	INT
11	(Japan)	Mina Tanaka	April 28, 1994 (aged 30)	2024	(Japan) INAC Kobe Leonessa	INT
13	(United States)	Brecken Mozingo	August 3, 2001 (aged 23)	2024	(United States) BYU Cougars	—
19	(United States)	KK Ream	July 8, 2009 (aged 15)	2025	(United States) Utah Avalanche	U18
24	(Canada)	Cloé Lacasse	July 7, 1993 (aged 31)	2024	(England) Arsenal	INT
25	(United States)	Cece Kizer	August 7, 1997 (aged 27)	2025	(United States) Gotham FC	—
30	(Guatemala)	Aisha Solórzano	April 13, 1998 (aged 26)	2025	(Mexico) Club Tijuana	—
53	(Canada)	Bianca St-Georges	July 28, 1997 (aged 27)	2025	(United States) North Carolina Courage	—

==== Out on loan ====
No.	Pos.	Nation	Player
—	MF	USA	Emily Gray (loaned to Piteå IF)

=== Technical staff ===
As of January 12, 2025

Technical staff
Role	Name
Sporting Director	Kelly Cousins
Head Coach	Jimmy Coenraets
Performance Coach/Analyst	Sam Lismont
Goalkeeper Coach	James White
Team Administrator	Vanessa Ramos
Head Athletic Trainer	Meghan Chambers
Assistant Athletic Trainer	Carlaine Myers
Head of Performance	Jess Mendez
Applied Sports Scientist	Maxine Furtado
Video Analyst	James Chandler
Equipment Manager	Maddie Holmberg

== Competitions ==
Win Draw Loss

=== Friendlies ===
February 6 Preseason	United City FC	0–3	Utah Royals	Chula Vista, California
12:00 pm MT		Report	Cluff 45'; Feldman 71'; Colbert 78'	Stadium: Chula Vista Elite Athlete Training Center

February 10 Preseason	San Diego Wave FC	3–2	Utah Royals	Chula Vista, California
2:00 pm MT	Goal	Report	Riehl; Tanaka	Stadium: Chula Vista Elite Athlete Training Center

February 13 Preseason	San Diego State Aztecs	1–3	Utah Royals	Chula Vista, California
8:00 pm MT	Goal	Report	Colbert 24', 28'; Feldman 65'	Stadium: Chula Vista Elite Athlete Training Center

=== Regular season ===
March 15 1	Utah Royals	1–1	Bay FC	Sandy, Utah
5:30 pm MDT (UTC-7)	St-Georges 12', (yellow card) 47'; Tejada (yellow card) 73'; Rábano (yellow card) 82'	Report	Kundananji (yellow card) 36'; Pickett 44', (yellow card) 45+5'; Hill (yellow card) 90+3'	Stadium: America First Field; Attendance: 10,624; Referee: Jaclyn Metz

March 22 2	San Diego Wave	3–2	Utah Royals	San Diego, California
8:00 pm MDT (UTC-7)	Sánchez 7'; Leon 37', (yellow card) 48'; McNabb (yellow card) 40'; Barcenas (yellow card) 70'; Corley 74'	Report	Zornoza 61'; Tanaka 72'	Stadium: Snapdragon Stadium; Attendance: 18,465; Referee: Shawn Tehini

March 29 3	Kansas City Current	3–0	Utah Royals	Kansas City, Missouri
5:30 pm MDT (UTC-7)	Chawinga 22'; Cooper 37'; Debinha 45+2'	Report	Pagarch (yellow card) 73'; Thomsen (yellow card) 75'	Stadium: CPKC Stadium; Attendance: 11,500; Referee: Marie Durr

April 11 4	Utah Royals	0–1	Portland Thorns	Sandy, Utah
8:00 pm MDT (UTC-7)	Foederer (yellow card) 62'; Del Fava (yellow card) 62'	Report	Hanks (yellow card) 10'; Turner 14'	Stadium: America First Field; Attendance: 5,051; Referee: Iryna Petrunok

April 18 5	Utah Royals	1–0	Chicago Stars	Sandy, Utah
7:30 pm MDT (UTC-7)	Pogarch (yellow card) 63'; Sentnor 90+10' (pen.)	Report	Ludmila (yellow card) 44'; Nesbeth (yellow card) 90+3'	Stadium: America First Field; Attendance: 17,085; Referee: John Matto

April 25 6	Houston Dash	1–0	Utah Royals	Houston, Texas
6:00 pm MDT (UTC-7)	Colaprico (yellow card) 27'; Sheehan 80'	Report	Tejada (yellow card) 73'; Rábano (yellow card) 86'	Stadium: Shell Energy Stadium; Attendance: 5,084; Referee: Adorae Monroy

May 3 7	Utah Royals	0–2	North Carolina Courage	Sandy, Utah
8:00 pm MDT (UTC-7)	Cluff (yellow card) 90+1'	Report	Sanchez 12'; Del Fava 43' (o.g.); Koyama (yellow card) 54'	Stadium: America First Field; Attendance: 7,371; Referee: Laura Rodriguez

May 9 8	Angel City FC	2–0	Utah Royals	Los Angeles, California
8:30 pm MDT (UTC-7)	G. Thompson (yellow card) 11'; Zelem (yellow card) 47'; A. Thompson (yellow card) 51', (goal) 90+7'; Press 66'	Report		Stadium: BMO Stadium; Attendance: 16,533; Referee: Alexandra Billeter

May 17 9	Washington Spirit	3–3	Utah Royals	Washington, D.C.
5:30 pm MDT (UTC-7)	Hatch 17'; Boade 20'; McKeown (yellow card) 45+3'; Krueger 90+12'	Report	Mozingo 9'; Kizer 22'; Bernal 36' (o.g.); McGlynn (yellow card) 87'; Tejada (yellow card) 89'	Stadium: Audi Field; Attendance: 15,016; Referee: Danielle Chesky

May 23 10	Utah Royals	1–3	Orlando Pride	Sandy, Utah
7:30 pm MDT (UTC-7)	Mozingo 14'; Flynn (yellow card) 50'	Report	Banda 6', 37', 38', (yellow card) 59'	Stadium: America First Field; Attendance: 11,668; Referee: John Griggs

June 6 11	Racing Louisville FC	3–2	Utah Royals	Louisville, Kentucky
6:34 pm MDT (UTC-7)	Sears 9', (yellow card) 68'; Jean 26'; Weber 85'; DeMelo (yellow card) 90+1'	Report	Mozingo 3'; St-Georges 31', (yellow card) 52'; Tejada (yellow card) 45+2' (yellow-red card) 73'; Rábano (yellow card) 71'	Stadium: Lynn Family Stadium; Attendance: 3,951; Referee: Adorae Monroy

June 13 12	Utah Royals	0–3	Gotham FC	Sandy, Utah
7:30 pm MDT (UTC-7)		Report		Stadium: America First Field

June 21 13	Utah Royals	1–4	Seattle Reign FC	Sandy, Utah
3:00 pm MDT (UTC-7)		Report		Stadium: America First Field

August 3 14	Orlando Pride	1–1	Utah Royals	Orlando, Florida
4:00 pm MDT (UTC-7)	Prisca Chilufya 72'	Report	Mina Tanaka 4'	Stadium: Inter&Co Stadium

August 8 15	Utah Royals	0–1	Kansas City Current	Sandy, Utah
8:00 pm MDT (UTC-7)		Report	Chawinga 82'	Stadium: America First Field

August 15 16	Utah Royals	0–0	Angel City FC	Sandy, Utah
7:00 p.m. PDT (UTC-7)	Solórzano (yellow card) 59'; Zornoza (yellow card) 88'	Report	Hammond (yellow card) 67'	Stadium: America First Field; Attendance: 6,299; Referee: Alyssa Nichols

August 23 17	Gotham FC	0–0	Utah Royals	Harrison, New Jersey
7:30 pm ET		Report	Lacasse (yellow card) 61'; Rábano (yellow card) 79'; Del Fava (yellow card) 90+1'	Stadium: Sports Illustrated Stadium; Attendance: 4,446; Referee: Gerald Flores

29 August 18	Portland Thorns	1–2	Utah Royals	Portland, Oregon
7:30 pm PDT	Turner (yellow card) 52'; Sugita (yellow card) 68'; Dufour 90+7'	Report	Monaghan 22' (yellow card) 79'; St-Georges (yellow card) 75'; Ream 85'	Stadium: Providence Park; Attendance: 16,066

September 6 19	North Carolina Courage	1–1	Utah Royals	Cary, North Carolina
5:30 pm MDT (UTC-7)	Shaw (yellow card) 21' (goal) 89' (pen.)	Report	Monaghan (yellow card) 87' (goal) 90+4'	Stadium: WakeMed Soccer Park; Attendance: 6,358; Referee: Abdou Ndiaye

September 14 20	Utah Royals	2–0	Houston Dash	Sandy, Utah
4:00 pm MDT (UTC-7)	Riehl 4'; Monaghan 45', (yellow card) 66'; Dorsey (yellow card) 72'	Report	Graham (yellow card) 84'	Stadium: America First Field; Referee: Marie Durr

September 19 21	Utah Royals	3–2	Racing Louisville FC	Sandy, Utah
10:00 pm ET	Tanaka 13', (yellow card) 53'; Thomsen 38'; Lacasse 45+3'; Rábano (yellow card) 77'; McGlynn (yellow card) 77'; Del Fava (yellow card) 90+2'	Report	Sears (yellow card) 57', (goal) 68'; DiGrande (yellow card) 71'; Sonis 81'	Stadium: America First Field; Attendance: 8,426; Referee: Lauren Aldrich

September 28 22	Bay FC	0–2	Utah Royals	San Jose, California
	Pickett 25'; Hill (yellow card) 44'; Kundananji (yellow card) 78'	Report	Thomsen 9'; Solórzano (yellow card) 13', (goal) 18'; Tejada (yellow card) 39'; Justus (yellow card) 82'	Stadium: PayPal Park; Attendance: 10,798; Referee: Rachel Swett

October 5 23	Chicago Stars FC	2–2	Utah Royals	Bridgeview, Illinois
	Schlegel (yellow card) 32'; Biegalski (yellow card) 60'; Chacón 83'; Johnson 86'	Report	Tanaka 59' 66' (pen.); St-Georges (yellow card) 70'; Prašnikar (yellow card) 72'	Stadium: SeatGeek Stadium; Attendance: 3,710; Referee: Jaclyn Metz

October 11 24	Utah Royals	2–3	San Diego Wave FC	Sandy, Utah
8:00 pm MDT (UTC-7)	Thomsen 9'; Lacasse (yellow card) 21'; Tanaka 54'; Monaghan (yellow card) 59'; Nagai (yellow card) 63'; Foederer (yellow card) 73'	Report	Lundkvist (yellow card) 23'; Dudinha 29'; Fazer (yellow card) 32'; Del Fava 45+1' (o.g.); Dali 72'	Stadium: America First Field; Attendance: 8,959; Referee: Danielle Chesky

October 17 25	Seattle Reign FC	2–1	Utah Royals	Seattle, Washington
8:00 pm MDT (UTC-7)	McCammon 45+2'; Huerta 67' (pen.)	Report	Lacasse (yellow card) 13'; Monaghan 61'; Del Fava (yellow card) 77'	Stadium: Lumen Field; Attendance: 7,930; Referee: Cristian Campo

November 2 26	Utah Royals	1–0	Washington Spirit	Sandy, Utah
	Monaghan 4', (yellow card) 68'; Foederer (yellow card) 90+4'	Report	McKeown (yellow card) 34'; Miura (yellow card) 90'	Stadium: America First Field; Attendance: 9,170; Referee: Alex Billeter

==== Regular-season standings ====
Pos	Team	Pld	W	D	L	GF	GA	GD	Pts
10	Houston Dash	26	8	6	12	27	39	−12	30
11	Angel City FC	26	7	6	13	31	41	−10	27
12	Utah Royals	26	6	7	13	28	42	−14	25
13	Bay FC	26	4	8	14	26	41	−15	20
14	Chicago Stars FC	26	3	11	12	32	54	−22	20

Source: NWSL
Rules for classification: 1) points; 2) total goal difference; 3) total wins; 4) total goals scored; 5) head-to-head points; 6) head-to-head goals scored; 7) fewest disciplinary points; 8) coin toss (if 2 clubs tied) or drawing of lots (if ≥3 clubs tied).

=== Friendlies ===
June 12	San Diego Wave FC	1–1	Utah Royals	San Diego, California
6:00 p.m. MDT (UTC-7)	McNabb	Report	Dorsey	Stadium: Torero Stadium

July 20	Utah Royals	2–2	San Diego Wave FC	Sandy, Utah
7:30 p.m. MDT (UTC-7)	Del Fava; Solórzano	Report	Carusa	Stadium: America First Field

== Squad statistics ==
As of December 26, 2025

=== Appearances and goals ===
Starting appearances are listed first, followed by substitute appearances after the + symbol where applicable.

No.	Pos	Nat	Player	Total		NWSL	
No.	Pos	Nat	Player	Apps	Goals	Apps	Goals
Goalkeepers
1	GK	(United States) USA	Mandy McGlynn	24	0	24	0
23	GK	(United States) USA	Mia Justus	2	0	2	0
77	GK	(United States) USA	DeAira Jackson	0	0	0	0
Defenders
2	DF	(United States) USA	Tatumn Milazzo	0	0	0	0
5	DF	(United States) USA	Lauren Flynn	9	0	6+3	0
7	DF	(Denmark) DEN	Janni Thomsen	26	3	20+6	3
8	DF	(United States) USA	Kate Del Fava	26	0	26	0
14	DF	(Spain) ESP	Nuria Rábano	22	0	21+1	0
15	DF	(United States) USA	Lauren Gogal	0	0	0	0
16	DF	(United States) USA	Madison Pogarch	18	0	5+13	0
17	DF	(Spain) ESP	Ana Tejada	23	0	20+3	0
18	DF	(United States) USA	Kaleigh Riehl	12	1	10+2	1
28	DF	(United States) USA	Imani Dorsey	17	0	5+12	0
Midfielders
10	MF	(Spain) ESP	Claudia Zornoza	24	1	24	1
12	MF	(United States) USA	Alex Loera	1	0	0+1	0
22	MF	(Netherlands) NED	Dana Foederer	24	0	10+14	0
32	MF	(United States) USA	Abby Boyan	0	0	0	0
33	MF	(United States) USA	Aria Nagai	11	0	7+4	0
Forwards
4	FW	(United States) USA	Paige Monaghan	16	5	14+2	5
9	FW	(Slovenia) SVN	Lara Prašnikar	5	0	1+4	0
11	FW	(Japan) JPN	Mina Tanaka	23	6	22+1	6
13	FW	(United States) USA	Brecken Mozingo	23	3	13+10	3
19	FW	(United States) USA	KK Ream	9	1	1+8	1
24	FW	(Canada) CAN	Cloé Lacasse	12	1	8+4	1
25	FW	(United States) USA	Cece Kizer	15	1	5+10	1
30	FW	(Guatemala) GUA	Aisha Solórzano	20	1	15+5	1
53	FW	(Canada) CAN	Bianca St-Georges	22	3	11+11	3
Players away from the club on loan:
	MF	(United States) USA	Emily Gray	0	0	0	0
Players who left the club during the season:
3	DF	(United States) USA	Olivia Griffitts	0	0	0	0
9	FW	(United States) USA	Ally Sentnor	13	1	13	1
14	MF	(New Zealand) NZL	Macey Fraser	5	0	2+3	0
15	DF	(Colombia) COL	Ana María Guzmán	5	0	0+5	0
21	MF	(United States) USA	Mikayla Cluff	7	0	1+6	0
32	GK	(Puerto Rico) PUR	Cristina Roque	0	0	0	0
34	DF	(United States) USA	Sydney Jones	1	0	0+1	0
Own goals for:
—	—		Rebeca Bernal (5/17 v. WAS)	0	1	0	1

== Transactions ==
=== Contract operations ===
Contract options
Date	Player	Pos.	Notes	Ref.
September 19, 2024	(United States) Lauren Flynn	DF	Options exercised for 2025.	
September 19, 2024	(Puerto Rico) Cristina Roque	GK	Options exercised for 2025.	

Re-signings
Date	Player	Pos.	Notes	Ref.
January 7, 2025	(United States) Paige Monaghan	FW	Re-signed to a three-year contract through 2027.	
January 9, 2025	(United States) Mandy McGlynn	GK	Re-signed to a five-year contract through 2029.	
July 29, 2025	(United States) Aria Nagai	MF	Re-signed to a salary cap-exempt contract through the end of 2025.	
August 22, 2025	(Japan) Mina Tanaka	FW	Re-signed to a three-year extension through 2028.	
September 4, 2025	(United States) Abby Boyan	MF	Extended through the end of 2025.	

=== Loans in ===
Date	Player	Pos.	Previous club	Fee/notes	Ref.
January 10, 2025	(Colombia) Ana María Guzmán	DF	(Germany) Bayern Munich	Loaned through the 2025 NWSL season; recalled early on July 10, 2025.	

=== Loans out ===
Date	Player	Pos.	Destination club	Fee/notes	Ref.
January 28, 2025	(United States) Emily Gray	MF	(Sweden) Piteå IF	Loaned through December 31, 2025.	

=== Transfers in ===
Date	Player	Pos.	Previous club	Fee/notes	Ref.
December 11, 2024	(United States) KK Ream	FW	(United States) Utah Avalanche	Signed with NWSL Under-18 Entry Mechanism to a three-year contract.	
December 18, 2024	(United States) Alex Loera	MF	(United States) Bay FC	Traded in exchange for $25,000 in intra-league transfer fees and a 15% sell-on fee.	
December 30, 2024	(United States) Mia Justus	GK	(United States) Texas Longhorns	Free agent rookie signed to a three-year contract.	
January 13, 2025	(Guatemala) Aisha Solórzano	FW	(Mexico) Club Tijuana	Acquired in exchange for an undisclosed fee and signed to a three-year contract.	
January 13, 2025	(United States) Tatumn Milazzo	DF	(United States) Chicago Stars FC	Free agent signed to a two-year contract.	
January 29, 2025	(Spain) Nuria Rábano	DF	(Germany) VfL Wolfsburg	Acquired in exchange for an undisclosed fee and signed to a three-year contract with a mutual option.	
March 4, 2025	(United States) Kayla Colbert	DF	(United States) USC Trojans	Signed to a short-term injury replacement contract.	
March 4, 2025	(United States) Sydney Jones	DF	(United States) Ohio State Buckeyes	Signed to a short-term injury replacement contract.	
March 4, 2025	(United States) Aria Nagai	MF	(United States) North Carolina Tar Heels	Signed to a salary cap-exempt contract.	
March 6, 2025	(Canada) Bianca St-Georges	FW	(United States) North Carolina Courage	Signed to a one-year contract.	
March 7, 2025	(Denmark) Janni Thomsen	DF	(Norway) Vålerenga	Signed to a two-year contract with a mutual option.	
April 18, 2025	(United States) Cece Kizer	FW	(United States) Gotham FC	Free agent signed to a two-year contract.	
July 11, 2025	(United States) DeAira Jackson	GK	(United States) Orlando Pride	Free agent signed to a one-year contract.	
August 13, 2025	(United States) Abby Boyan	MF	(Iceland) Fylkir	Free agent signed to a roster relief contract through August 31, 2025.	
August 31, 2025	(Slovenia) Lara Prašnikar	FW	(Germany) Eintracht Frankfurt	Acquired in exchange for an undisclosed fee and signed through 2027.	
September 12, 2025	(United States) Lauren Gogal	DF	(United States) Washington Spirit	Free agent signed through the end of 2025.	

=== Transfers out ===
Date	Player	Pos.	Destination club	Fee/notes	Ref.
December 10, 2024	(United States) Hannah Betfort	FW	(United States) North Carolina Courage	Out of contract.	
December 10, 2024	(Canada) Zoe Burns	DF	(France) FC Fleury 91	Out of contract.	
December 10, 2024	(United States) Julia Grosso	DF	(United States) Fort Lauderdale United FC	Out of contract.	
December 10, 2024	(United States) Shaelan Murison	FW	(United States) Oakland Soul SC	Out of contract.	
December 10, 2024	(United States) Darielle O'Brien	DF		Out of contract.	
December 10, 2024	(United States) Carly Nelson	GK		Out of contract.	
December 10, 2024	(United States) Cameron Tucker	FW	(Spain) Levante UD	Out of contract.	
January 13, 2025	(Sweden) Agnes Nyberg	MF	(Norway) Rosenborg	Released.	
January 13, 2025	(United States) Michele Vasconcelos	FW	(Spain) Levante Badalona	Released.	
March 14, 2025	(United States) Kayla Colbert	DF		Released.	
May 2, 2025	(United States) Sydney Jones	DF	(United States) Kansas City Current II	Released.	
June 4, 2025	(Puerto Rico) Cristina Roque	GK	(United States) Racing Louisville FC	Traded in exchange for $50,000 in allocation money.	
August 1, 2025	(United States) Ally Sentnor	FW	(United States) Kansas City Current	Traded in exchange for $600,000 in intraleague transfer funds, a conditional $100,000, and a sell-on clause.	
September 4, 2025	(New Zealand) Macey Fraser	MF	(New Zealand) Wellington Phoenix FC	Mutual contract termination.	
September 6, 2025	(United States) Mikayla Cluff	MF	(United States) Seattle Reign FC	Mutual contract termination.	
September 23, 2025	(United States) Olivia Griffitts	DF	Retirement.		

=== Preseason trialists ===
Trialists are non-rostered invitees during preseason and are not automatically signed. The Royals released their preseason roster on January 15, 2025.

Player	Pos.	Previous club	Status	Ref.
(United States) Jennifer Blitchok	FW	(United States) Western Michigan Broncos	Not signed.	
(United States) Cora Brendle	GK	(United States) Utah State Aggies	Not signed.	
(United States) Kayla Colbert	FW	(United States) USC Trojans	Signed.	
(United States) Maryn Granger	DF	(United States) Utah Utes	Not signed.	
(United States) Sydney Jones	DF	(United States) Ohio State Buckeyes	Signed.	
(United States) Aria Nagai	MF	(United States) North Carolina Tar Heels	Signed.	
(United States) Chloe Sadler	MF	(United States) La Roca Premier	U18 trialist. Not signed.	
