= 2024 Utah Royals season =

Utah Royals
2024 season
- Owners: Ryan Smith; David Blitzer
- Sporting Director: Kelly Cousins
- Head coach: Jimmy Coenraets (interim since June 30; permanent since October 24); Amy Rodriguez (until June 30)
- Stadium: America First Field
- NWSL: 11th of 14
- NWSL x Liga MX Femenil Summer Cup: Group stage
- Top goalscorer: League: Cloé Lacasse (4); All: Ally Sentnor (5)
- Highest home attendance: 20,370 (Mar 16 vs CHI)
- Lowest home attendance: 7,491 (May 25 vs KC)
- Average home league attendance: 10,304
Home colors	Away colors
- All statistics correct as of January 12, 2025.

The 2024 Utah Royals season marks the team's fourth season of existence in the National Women's Soccer League (NWSL), the top division of the American soccer pyramid. This season marks the team's first since 2020, after which the original club relocated to become the Kansas City Current. The club plays its home games at America First Field in the Salt Lake City suburb of Sandy. The club's head coach is Jimmy Coenraets, who served as interim head coach following the firing of former Royal and national team player Amy Rodriguez and was named the permanent head coach on October 24.

== Staffing changes ==
On April 19, 2023, the Royals hired former Royals player and USC Trojans women's soccer assistant coach Amy Rodriguez as the club's head coach. The role was Rodriguez's first as a head coach. Club president Michelle Hyncik was a high-school teammate of Rodriguez's and offered the role to Rodriguez.

On July 18, 2023, the Royals hired former Reading F.C. Women manager Kelly Cousins as the club's first sporting director.

On March 13, 2024, the Royals announced the hiring of Reno MVLA Soccer Club coaching director Vanessa Mann and D.C. United assistant coach Frédéric Brillant as the club's assistant coaches, and UConn Huskies women's soccer assistant coach Maryse Bard-Martel as goalkeeping coach.

On May 20, Brillant was announced as the head coach for DC Power FC of the newly formed USL Super League.

On June 7, the Royals hired Oud-Heverlee Leuven manager Jimmy Coenraets as an assistant coach and Sam Lismont as a performance analyst.

After 11 league matches and a 1–9–1 record putting the team in last place, the Royals organization fired Rodriguez and Bard-Martel on June 30. The Royals also reassigned team president Michelle Hyncik, who had hired Rodriguez, to a position with the Blitzer Family Office and appointed Coenraets as the team's interim head coach.

On October 9, the Royals hired former Bristol City Women goalkeeping coach James White as the team's goalkeeping coach. White had previously worked for Cousins at Reading Women.

On October 24, the Royals named Coenraets the club's permanent head coach and announced that he had signed a contract to remain with the club through the 2027 season.

== Club ==
=== Roster ===
As of October 21, 2024

No.	Pos.	Nation	Player
1	GK	USA	Mandy Haught
2	DF	USA	Julia Grosso
3	DF	USA	Olivia Griffitts
4	FW	USA	Paige Monaghan
5	FW	USA	Lauren Flynn
6	MF	SWE	Agnes Nyberg
7	FW	USA	Michele Vasconcelos
8	DF	USA	Kate Del Fava
9	FW	USA	Ally Sentnor
12	DF	CAN	Zoe Burns
14	MF	NZL	Macey Fraser
15	FW	USA	Brecken Mozingo
16	DF	USA	Madison Pogarch
17	DF	ESP	Ana Tejada
18	DF	USA	Kaleigh Riehl
20	FW	USA	Cameron Tucker
21	MF	USA	Mikayla Cluff
22	MF	NED	Dana Foederer
23	DF	USA	Darielle O'Brien
24	FW	CAN	Cloé Lacasse
26	MF	ESP	Claudia Zornoza
27	GK	USA	Carly Nelson
28	DF	USA	Imani Dorsey
29	MF	JPN	Mina Tanaka
32	GK	PUR	Cristina Roque
33	FW	USA	Hannah Betfort

=== On loan ===
No.	Pos.	Nation	Player
24	MF	USA	Emily Gray (at Odense Boldklub Q until December 31, 2024)

== Competitions ==
=== NWSL regular season ===
The Royals were eliminated from playoff contention after Bay FC defeated the North Carolina Courage on October 19.

==== Matches ====
March 16 1	Utah Royals	0–2	Chicago Red Stars	Sandy, Utah
5:30 pm MT	Sentnor (yellow card) 44'; Nyberg (yellow card) 62'	Report	Schlegel 50'; Hocking (yellow card) 60'; Cook 77', (yellow card) 90+6'	Stadium: America First Field; Attendance: 20,370; Referee: Gaad Flores

March 22 2	Utah Royals	2–1	North Carolina Courage	Sandy, Utah
7:30 pm MT	Del Fava 15'; Foederer (yellow card) 17'; Sentnor 30'; Betfort (yellow card) 47'; Cluff (yellow card) 90+2'; Haught (yellow card) 90+7'	Report	Sanchez 26'	Stadium: America First Field; Attendance: 8,161; Referee: Elijio Arreguin

March 31 3	Washington Spirit	2–1	Utah Royals	Washington, D.C.
11 pm MT	Sullivan 21' (pen.); Sarr 30'	Report	Foederer (yellow card) 29'; Del Fava (yellow card) 49'; Sentnor 71'	Stadium: Audi Field; Attendance: 8,182; Referee: Nabil Bensalah

April 12 4	Utah Royals	0–1	Orlando Pride	Sandy, Utah
7:30 pm MT	Pogarch (yellow card) 26'	Report	Marta 68'; Abello (yellow card) 71'; McCutcheon (yellow card) 90+'	Stadium: America First Field; Attendance: 8,578; Referee: Thomas Snyder

April 20 5	Racing Louisville FC	5–1	Utah Royals	Louisville, Kentucky
3 pm MT	Milliet (yellow card) 13'; Kanu 26'; DeMelo (yellow card) 37', (goal) 68', 78' (pen.); Turner 87'; Sears 90+1'	Report	Griffitts 45+'; Flynn (yellow card) 72'	Stadium: Lynn Family Stadium; Attendance: 11,365; Referee: Joshua Encarnación

April 27 6	Utah Royals	0–0	Houston Dash	Sandy, Utah
5:30 pm MT	Monaghan (yellow card) 42'	Report	Andressa (yellow card) 20'; Bachmann (yellow card) 54'; Olivieri (yellow card) 85'	Stadium: America First Field; Attendance: 10,349; Referee: Shawn Tehini

May 3 7	Utah Royals	1–2	Angel City FC	Sandy, Utah
7:30 pm MT	Griffitts (yellow card) 38'; Foederer 51'; Flynn (yellow card) 90+1'	Report	Leroux 29'; Emslie 40' (pen.); Rodríguez (yellow card) 44'; Thompson (yellow card) 87'; Fuller (yellow card) 87'; Nabet (yellow card) 90+3'	Stadium: America First Field; Attendance: 10,731; Referee: Ricardo Fierro

May 8 8	San Diego Wave FC	2–0	Utah Royals	San Diego, California
8:00 pm MT	Shaw 35'; Doniak 77'; Westphal (yellow card) 79'; Colaprico (yellow card) 87'	Report	Monaghan (yellow card) 35'; Pogarch (yellow card) 37'; Foederer (yellow card) 51'; Sentnor (yellow card) 90+5'	Stadium: Snapdragon Stadium; Attendance: 10,289; Referee: Katja Koroleva

May 12 9	Chicago Red Stars	3–1	Utah Royals	Bridgeview, Illinois
3:30 pm MT	Bike 23'; Swanson 29' (pen.); Hocking 90+7'	Report	Cluff (yellow card) 33'; Henry (yellow card) 47'; Tucker 81'	Stadium: SeatGeek Stadium; Attendance: 3,104; Referee: Alyssa Nichols

May 17 10	North Carolina Courage	1–0	Utah Royals	Cary, North Carolina
6:00 pm MT	Kurtz 76'	Report	Nyberg (yellow card) 17'; Henry (yellow card) 86'	Stadium: WakeMed Soccer Park; Attendance: 4,528; Referee: Alex Billeter

May 25 11	Utah Royals	0–1	Kansas City Current	Sandy, Utah
8:00 pm MT	Tejada (yellow card) 3'	Report	Ball 58'; Spaanstra (yellow card) 90+6'; Mace (yellow card) 90+9'	Stadium: America First Field; Attendance: 7,491; Referee: Danielle Chesky

June 8 12	Utah Royals	1–0	Washington Spirit	Sandy, Utah
5:30 pm MT	Flynn (yellow card) 9'	Report	Wiesner 26'; Carle (yellow card) 85'	Stadium: America First Field; Attendance: 8,486; Referee: Laura Rodriguez

June 16 13	Bay FC	0–1	Utah Royals	San Jose, California
8:00 pm MT	Anderson (yellow card) 37'; Dydasco (yellow card) 45'; Sharples (yellow card) 80'; Boade (yellow card) 88'	Report	Del Fava 89'	Stadium: PayPal Park; Attendance: 10,367; Referee: Anya Voigt

June 21 14	Orlando Pride	6–0	Utah Royals	Orlando, Florida
6:00 pm MT	Banda 27' (Abello), 86'; Yates 45+3'; Marta 47', 88' (Banda); Watt 90+5' (Banda)	Report	Tejada (yellow card) 51'	Stadium: Inter&Co Stadium; Attendance: 9,656; Referee: Alyssa Nichols

June 29 15	Utah Royals	0–0	Portland Thorns FC	Sandy, Utah
8:00 pm MT	Del Fava (yellow card) 44'	Report	Hubly (yellow card) 90'	Stadium: America First Field; Attendance: 8,677; Referee: Sergil Demlanchuk

July 7 16	Seattle Reign FC	1–1	Utah Royals	Seattle, Washington
4:00 pm MT	Latsko 75'	Report	Sentnor 67'	Stadium: Lumen Field; Attendance: 6,276; Referee: Matthew Thompson

August 23 17	Utah Royals	2-1	Bay FC	Sandy, Utah
7:30 pm MT	Monaghan 48' (Tejada); Menges 55' (o.g.); Tejada (yellow card) 87'	Report	Kundananji 83' (Hill)	Stadium: America First Field; Attendance: 14,539; Referee: Jaclyn Metz

August 31 18	Houston Dash	1–3	Utah Royals	Houston, Texas
7:30 pm MT	Jacobs (yellow card) 17'; Alozie (yellow card) 45+3'; Olivieri (yellow card) 53'; Nielsen (yellow card) 71'; Alves 73', (yellow card) 90'	Report	Tejada 44', (yellow card) 90+11'; Zornoza 55'; Monaghan 60'; Tanaka (yellow card) 90+5'	Stadium: Shell Energy Stadium; Attendance: 5,171; Referee: Gerald Flores

September 7 19	Kansas City Current	1–0	Utah Royals FC	Kansas City, Missouri
3:30 p.m. MT	Chawinga 47'	Report		Stadium: CPKC Stadium; Attendance: 11,500; Referee: Calin Radosav

September 14 20	Utah Royals	1–2	San Diego Wave FC	Sandy, Utah
8:00 pm MT	Zornoza (yellow card) 57'; Lacasse 59'; Tejada (yellow card) 71'; Tucker (yellow card) 80'	Report	Ali 1'; Cascarino 6'	Stadium: America First Field; Attendance: 9,494; Referee: Laura Rodriguez

September 22 21	NJ/NY Gotham FC	1–0	Utah Royals	Harrison, New Jersey
11:00 am MT	Ryan 3'	Report	Lacasse (yellow card) 43'; Betfort (yellow card) 87'	Stadium: Red Bull Arena; Attendance: 7,680; Referee: Eric Tattersall

September 28 22	Utah Royals	1–0	Racing Louisville FC	Sandy, Utah
5:00 pm MT	Tucker (yellow card) 10'; Del Fava (yellow card) 56'; Riehl (yellow card) 66'; Tejada 78'; Burns (yellow card) 87'	Report	Flint (yellow card) 45+3'	Stadium: America First Field; Attendance: 9,002; Referee: Alexandra Billeter

October 5 23	Portland Thorns FC	1–2	Utah Royals	Portland, Oregon
5:00 pm MT	Moultrie 53' (pen.)	Report	Betfort 47'; Tanaka 50'	Stadium: Providence Park; Attendance: 17,451; Referee: Rebecca Pagan

October 13 24	Utah Royals	3–0	Seattle Reign FC	Sandy, Utah
3:00 pm MT	Lacasse 3', 20', 45+6'; Pogarch (yellow card) 50'; Tanaka (yellow card) 73'	Report; Report	James (yellow card) 4' (yellow-red card) 16'; Howell (yellow card) 66'	Stadium: America First Field; Attendance: 8,192; Referee: Elvis Osmanovic

October 20 25	Angel City FC	1–1	Utah Royals	Los Angeles, California
5:30 pm MT	Curry (yellow card) 19'; Thompson (yellow card) 21'; Zelem (yellow card) 39'; Leroux 57'	Report	Zornoza 21'	Stadium: BMO Stadium; Attendance: 20,039; Referee: Sergii Demianchuk

November 1 26	Utah Royals	1–4	NJ/NY Gotham FC	Sandy, Utah
7:30 pm MT	Betfort 73'	Report	Ryan 14'; Freeman 16'; Stevens (yellow card) 21'; Esther 76', 83'; Nighswonger (yellow card) 86'; Carter (yellow card) 90+6'	Stadium: America First Field; Attendance: 9,879; Referee: Adorae Monroy

==== Standings ====
Pos	Team	Pld	W	D	L	GF	GA	GD	Pts
9	Racing Louisville FC	26	7	7	12	33	39	−6	28
10	San Diego Wave FC	26	6	7	13	24	35	−11	25
11	Utah Royals	26	7	4	15	22	40	−18	25
12	Angel City FC	26	7	6	13	29	42	−13	24 (Note: Angel City FC were deducted three points for breaching spending cap rules.)
13	Seattle Reign FC	26	6	5	15	27	44	−17	23

Source: NWSL
Rules for classification: Tiebreakers

=== NWSL x Liga MX Femenil Summer Cup ===
The Utah Royals competed in the first edition of the NWSL x Liga MX Femenil Summer Cup. Group stage play began on July 19. The Royals finished at the top of Group A, but were the fifth-ranked group winner of the five groups and failed to advance to the tournament's knockout rounds.

Pos	Team	Pld	W	PW	PL	L	GF	GA	GD	Pts	UTA	POR	SEA	TIJ
1	(United States Soccer Federation) Utah Royals	3	2	0	0	1	9	4	+5	6	—	3–1	1–2	5–1
2	(United States Soccer Federation) Portland Thorns FC	3	2	0	0	1	7	3	+4	6	1–3	—	1–0	5–0
3	(United States Soccer Federation) Seattle Reign FC	3	1	0	0	2	4	5	−1	3	2–1	0–1	—	2–3
4	(Mexican Football Federation) Tijuana	3	1	0	0	2	4	12	−8	3	1–5	0–5	3–2	—

Source: NWSL
Rules for classification: tiebreakers

==== Matches ====
July 19 GS	Seattle Reign FC (United States)	2–1	(United States) Utah Royals	Seattle, Washington
7:00 pm MT	Athens 43' (pen.); Huerta 77'	Report	Tucker 49'	Stadium: Lumen Field

July 27 GS	Utah Royals (United States)	3–1	(United States) Portland Thorns FC	Sandy, Utah
8:00 pm MT	Betfort 3'; Sentnor 21'; Vasconcelos 76'	Report	Moultrie 86'	Stadium: America First Field

July 31 GS	Utah Royals (United States)	5–1	(Mexico) Tijuana	Sandy, Utah
8:00 pm MT	Monaghan 20'; Betfort 44'; Sentnor 48'; Mozingo 64', 90+5'	Report	Solórzano 3'	Stadium: America First Field

== Statistics ==
=== Squad appearances ===
As of November 2, 2024

No.	Pos.	Nat.	Player	Total		NWSL Regular Season		Summer Cup	
No.	Pos.	Nat.	Player	Apps	Starts	Apps	Starts	Apps	Starts
Goalkeepers
1	GK	(United States)	Mandy Haught	25	25	24	24	1	1
27	GK	(United States)	Carly Nelson	1	1	1	1	0	0
32	GK	(Puerto Rico)	Cristina Roque	3	3	1	1	2	2
Defenders
3	DF	(United States)	Olivia Griffitts	15	14	13	13	2	1
5	DF	(United States)	Lauren Flynn	12	10	12	10	0	0
8	DF	(United States)	Kate Del Fava	29	29	26	26	3	3
12	DF	(Canada)	Zoe Burns	24	16	21	14	3	2
16	DF	(United States)	Madison Pogarch	28	24	25	21	3	3
17	DF	(Spain)	Ana Tejada	18	18	15	15	3	3
18	DF	(United States)	Kaleigh Riehl	17	17	14	14	3	3
23	DF	(United States)	Darielle O'Brien	1	0	0	0	1	0
28	DF	(United States)	Imani Dorsey	2	2	2	2	0	0
Midfielders
6	MF	(Sweden)	Agnes Nyberg	12	8	11	8	1	0
14	MF	(New Zealand)	Macey Fraser	4	2	4	2	0	0
21	MF	(United States)	Mikayla Cluff	11	5	11	5	0	0
22	MF	(Netherlands)	Dana Foederer	26	21	23	17	3	3
26	MF	(Spain)	Claudia Zornoza	10	10	10	10	0	0
Forwards
4	FW	(United States)	Paige Monaghan	25	23	22	20	3	3
7	FW	(United States)	Michele Vasconcelos	17	2	15	2	2	0
9	FW	(United States)	Ally Sentnor	23	23	21	21	2	2
15	FW	(United States)	Brecken Mozingo	21	13	18	10	3	3
20	FW	(United States)	Cameron Tucker	19	4	18	3	1	1
24	FW	(Canada)	Cloé Lacasse	9	8	9	8	0	0
29	FW	(Japan)	Mina Tanaka	7	7	7	7	0	0
33	FW	(United States)	Hannah Betfort	27	21	24	18	3	3
Other players (Departed during season, short-term loan, etc.)
2	MF	(United States)	Ellie Boren	2	0	0	0	2	0
10	MF	(France)	Amandine Henry	10	9	10	9	0	0
11	FW	(Nigeria)	Ifeoma Onumonu	3	0	3	0	0	0
13	DF	(United States)	Addisyn Merrick	7	1	4	1	3	0
19	MF	(United States)	Frankie Tagliaferri	6	4	6	4	0	0
24	MF	(United States)	Emily Gray	0	2	0	2	0	0
35	FW	(United States)	Shaelan Murison	6	1	4	1	2	0

=== Goals ===
As of November 2, 2024

Rank	Player	Total	NWSL Regular Season	Summer Cup
1	(United States) Ally Sentnor	5	3	2
2	(United States) Hannah Betfort	4	2	2
2	(Canada) Cloé Lacasse	4	4	0
4	(United States) Paige Monaghan	3	2	1
5	(United States) Kate Del Fava	2	2	0
5	(United States) Brecken Mozingo	2	0	2
5	(Spain) Ana Tejada	2	2	0
5	(United States) Cameron Tucker	2	1	1
5	(United States) Michele Vasconcelos	2	1	1
5	(Spain) Claudia Zornoza	2	2	0
11	(Netherlands) Dana Foederer	1	1	0
11	(United States) Olivia Griffitts	1	1	0
11	(Japan) Mina Tanaka	1	1	0

=== Assists ===
As of November 2, 2024

Rank	Player	Total	NWSL Regular Season	Summer Cup
1	(United States) Ally Sentnor	5	4	1
2	(Netherlands) Dana Foederer	4	2	2
3	(United States) Paige Monaghan	3	1	2
3	(Spain) Claudia Zornoza	3	3	0
5	(Spain) Ana Tejada	2	1	1
6	(United States) Shaelan Murison	1	0	1
6	(United States) Kaleigh Riehl	1	1	0
6	(United States) Michele Vasconcelos	1	1	0

=== Clean sheets ===
As of November 2, 2024

Rank	Player	Total	NWSL Regular Season	Summer Cup
1	(United States) Mandy Haught	4	4	0
2	(Puerto Rico) Cristina Roque	1	1	0

== Transactions ==
=== 2024 NWSL Expansion Draft ===
The 2024 NWSL expansion draft was held on December 18, 2023.

P	Player	Pos.	Previous team	Ref.
2	(United States) Elyse Bennett	FW	Seattle Reign FC	
4	(United States) Paige Monaghan	FW	Racing Louisville FC	
6	PASS			
8	PASS			
10	PASS			

=== 2024 NWSL Draft ===
Draft picks are not automatically signed to the team roster. The 2024 NWSL Draft was held on January 12, 2024.

R	P	Player	Pos.	College	Status	Ref.
1	1	(United States) Ally Sentnor	FW	University of North Carolina	Signed to a three-year contract on February 19, 2024.	
1	4	(United States) Brecken Mozingo	FW	Brigham Young University	Signed to a two-year contract with an option on February 23, 2024.	
2	16	(United States) Lauren Flynn	DF	Florida State University	Signed to a one-year contract with an option on March 12, 2024.	
2	20	(United States) Olivia Griffitts	DF	Brigham Young University	Signed to a one-year contract with an option on March 21, 2024.	
2	26	(United States) Emma Jaskaniec	MF	University of Wisconsin-Madison	Not signed.	
3	29	(Canada) Zoe Burns	DF	University of Southern California	Signed to a one-year contract on March 7, 2024.	
3	33	(Puerto Rico) Cristina Roque	GK	Florida State University	Signed to a one-year contract with an option on March 13, 2024.	

=== Re-signings ===
Date	Player	Pos.	Notes	Ref.
August 28, 2024	(United States) Darielle O'Brien	DF	Former national team replacement player re-signed to an injury replacement contract.	

=== Loans out ===
Date	Player	Pos.	Destination club	Fee/notes	Ref.
November 15, 2022	(United States) Emily Gray	MF	(Denmark) Odense Boldklub Q	Loaned through the remainder of the 2024 NWSL season.	

=== Transfers in ===
Date	Player	Pos.	Previous club	Fee/notes	Ref.
November 15, 2023	(United States) Mikayla Cluff	MF	(United States) Orlando Pride	Traded in exchange for $90,000 in Allocation Money and protection in the 2024 NWSL expansion draft.	
November 20, 2023	(United States) Kaleigh Riehl	DF	(United States) San Diego Wave FC	Traded in exchange for $60,000 in Allocation Money and protection in the 2024 NWSL expansion draft.	
November 20, 2023	(United States) Emily Gray	MF	(United States) North Carolina Courage	Traded in exchange for $30,000 in Allocation Money and protection in the 2024 NWSL expansion draft.	
November 20, 2023	(United States) Frankie Tagliaferri	MF	(United States) North Carolina Courage	Traded in exchange for $30,000 in Allocation Money and protection in the 2024 NWSL expansion draft.	
November 21, 2023	(United States) Michele Vasconcelos	FW	(United States) Portland Thorns FC	Free agent signed to a two-year contract.	
November 29, 2023	(United States) Imani Dorsey	DF	(United States) NJ/NY Gotham FC	Free agent signed to a two-year contract.	
December 7, 2023	(United States) Madison Pogarch	DF	(United States) San Diego Wave FC	Free agent signed to a two-year contract.	
December 12, 2023	(United States) Mandy Haught	GK	(United States) NJ/NY Gotham FC	Traded in exchange for $150,000 in Allocation Money and protection in the 2024 NWSL expansion draft.	
December 12, 2023	(United States) Kate Del Fava	DF	(United States) Kansas City Current	Traded, along with the 4th overall pick in the 2024 NWSL Draft, in exchange for $75,000 in Allocation Money and protection in the 2024 NWSL expansion draft.	
December 12, 2023	(United States) Hannah Betfort	FW	(United States) Portland Thorns FC	Traded, along with $10,000 if allocation money and the 33rd overall pick of the 2024 NWSL Draft, in exchange for protection in the 2024 NWSL expansion draft.	
December 12, 2023	(United States) Carly Nelson	GK	(United States) Orlando Pride	Traded, along with $65,000 in allocation money, in exchange for a 2024 international roster spot.	
December 12, 2023	(United States) Cameron Tucker	FW	(United States) Houston Dash	Traded, along with $50,000 of allocation money, in exchange for protection in the 2024 NWSL expansion draft.	
December 18, 2023	(United States) Addisyn Merrick	DF	(United States) Kansas City Current	Free agent signed to a two-year contract.	
December 30, 2023	(Nigeria) Ifeoma Onumonu	FW	(United States) NJ/NY Gotham FC	Traded in exchange for $40,000 in allocation money.	
January 2, 2024	(Sweden) Agnes Nyberg	MF	(Sweden) IK Uppsala	Free agent signed to a two-year contract.	
January 5, 2024	(Netherlands) Dana Foederer	MF	(Netherlands) Fortuna Sittard	Acquired in exchange for an undisclosed fee and signed to a two-year contract.	
April 16, 2024	(New Zealand) Macey Fraser	MF	(New Zealand) Wellington Phoenix FC	Acquired in exchange for an undisclosed fee and signed to a three-year contract with an option.	
April 20, 2024	(France) Amandine Henry	MF	(United States) Angel City FC	Traded in exchange for $75,000 of allocation money.	
April 22, 2024	(Spain) Ana Tejada	DF	(Spain) Real Sociedad	Acquired in exchange for an undisclosed fee and signed to a three-year contract with an option.	
July 5, 2024	(Japan) Mina Tanaka	FW	(Japan) INAC Kobe Leonessa	Free agent signed to a two-year contract through 2025.	
July 12, 2024	(Spain) Claudia Zornoza	MF	(Spain) Real Madrid	Signed to a two-year contract through 2025 with an option.	
July 17, 2024	(United States) Ellie Boren	MF	(United States) BYU Cougars	Signed to a national team replacement contract.	
July 17, 2024	(United States) Shaelan Murison	MF	(United States) Oakland Soul SC	Signed to a national team replacement contract.	
July 17, 2024	(United States) Darielle O'Brien	DF	(United States) United City FC Women	Signed to a national team replacement contract.	
August 14, 2024	(Canada) Cloé Lacasse	FW	(England) Arsenal	Signed to a four-year contract through 2027.	
September 1, 2024	(United States) Julia Grosso	DF	(Australia) Melbourne City	Free agent signed to a one-year contract through the remainder of 2024.	
September 5, 2024	(United States) Shaelan Murison	MF	(United States) Utah Royals	Signed to a national team replacement contract.	

=== Transfers out ===
Date	Player	Pos.	Destination club	Fee/notes	Ref.
December 17, 2023	(United States) Elyse Bennett	FW	(United States) San Diego Wave FC	Traded in exchange for $40,000 in allocation money.	
August 19, 2024	(United States) Shaelan Murison	MF	(United States) Utah Royals	National team replacement players released.	
August 19, 2024	(United States) Ellie Boren	MF		National team replacement players released.	
September 5, 2024	(United States) Addisyn Merrick	DF	(United States) Carolina Ascent FC	Mutual contract termination.	
September 6, 2024	(Nigeria) Ifeoma Onumonu	FW	(France) Montpellier	Mutual contract termination.	
September 6, 2024	(France) Amandine Henry	MF	(Mexico) Deportivo Toluca	Mutual contract termination.	
October 10, 2024	(United States) Frankie Tagliaferri	MF		Waived.	

=== Injury listings ===
Date	Player	Pos.	List	Injury	Ref.
April 11, 2024	(United States) Imani Dorsey	DF	Season-ending injury	Ruptured left Achilles sustained in match against the North Carolina Courage.	
August 28, 2024	(United States) Lauren Flynn	DF	Season-ending injury	Bilateral compartment syndrome in lower legs.	
October 30, 2024	(Canada) Cloé Lacasse	FW	Season-ending injury	Ruptured ACL and sprained MCL sustained in match against Angel City FC.	
