= NWSL Goal of the Week =

The National Women's Soccer League Goal of the Week is a weekly soccer award given to individual players in the National Women's Soccer League. The honor is awarded by popular social media vote to the player deemed to have scored the best goal over the past week. The award was given out during the 2016–2019 seasons and was reintroduced in 2024.

== Winners ==
=== 2016 ===
Week	Player	Club	Ref.
1	(Australia) Steph Catley	Orlando Pride	
2	(United States) Ali Krieger	Washington Spirit	
3	(United States) Christen Press	Chicago Red Stars	
4	(United States) Christen Press (2)	Chicago Red Stars	
5	(United States) Alex Morgan	Orlando Pride	
6	(United States) Tobin Heath	Portland Thorns FC	
7	(United States) Erika Tymrak	FC Kansas City	
8	(United States) Christen Press (3)	Chicago Red Stars	
9	(United States) Becky Sauerbrunn	FC Kansas City	
10	(United States) Jasmyne Spencer	Orlando Pride	
11	(Iceland) Dagný Brynjarsdóttir	Portland Thorns FC	
12	(United States) Kristen Edmonds	Orlando Pride	
13	(Argentina) Estefanía Banini	Washington Spirit	
14	(England) Rachel Daly	Houston Dash	
15	(England) Rachel Daly (2)	Houston Dash	
16	(United States) Christine Nairn	Washington Spirit	
17	(United States) Alex Morgan (2)	Orlando Pride	
18	(United States) Christen Press (4)	Chicago Red Stars	
19	(United States) Kealia Ohai	Houston Dash	

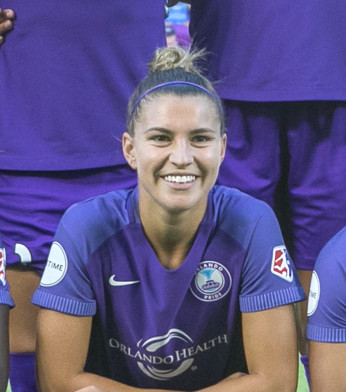
Steph Catley, first winner of the award

=== 2017 ===
Week	Player	Club	Ref.
1	(England) Rachel Daly	Houston Dash	
2	(United States) Danica Evans	Orlando Pride	
3	(Brazil) Camila	Orlando Pride	
4	(Wales) Jess Fishlock	Seattle Reign FC	
5	(United States) Christen Press	Chicago Red Stars	
6	(United States) Sofia Huerta	Chicago Red Stars	
7	(United States) Becky Sauerbrunn	FC Kansas City	
8	(United States) Lindsey Horan	Portland Thorns FC	
9	(Brazil) Camila (2)	Orlando Pride	
10	(United States) Vanessa DiBernardo	Chicago Red Stars	
11	(Australia) Sam Kerr	Sky Blue FC	
12	(United States) Lindsey Horan (2)	Portland Thorns FC	
13	(United States) Toni Pressley	Orlando Pride	
14	(United States) Megan Rapinoe	Seattle Reign FC	
14	(United States) Christen Press (2)	Chicago Red Stars	
15	(United States) Sofia Huerta (2)	Chicago Red Stars	
16	(Brazil) Marta	Orlando Pride	
17	(Australia) Sam Kerr (2)	Sky Blue FC	
18	(United States) Alex Morgan	Orlando Pride	
19	(United States) Julie Ertz	Chicago Red Stars	
20	(Canada) Christine Sinclair	Portland Thorns FC	
21	(England) Rachel Daly (2)	Houston Dash	
22	(Australia) Alanna Kennedy	Orlando Pride	

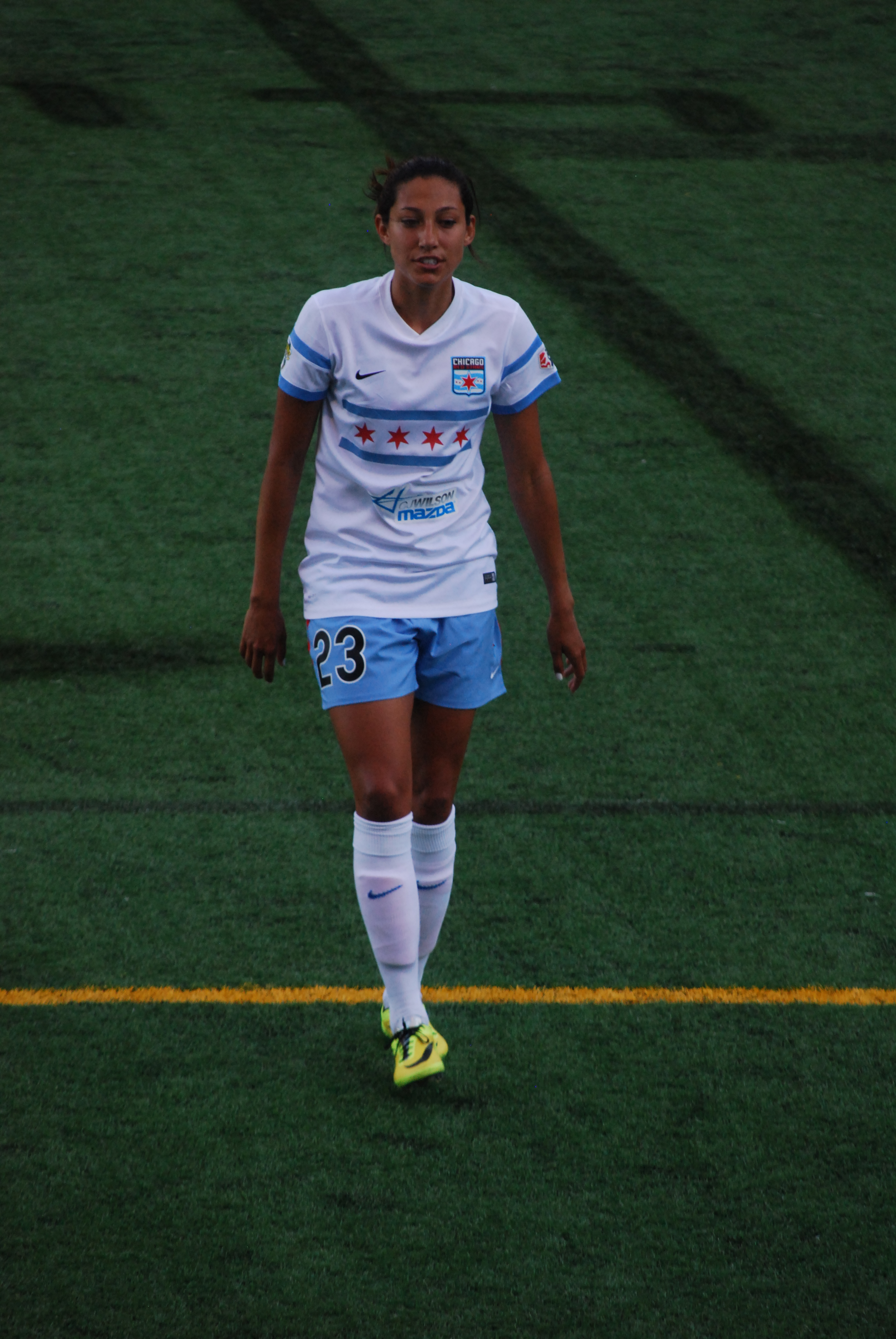
Christen Press, record holder with 11 awards

=== 2018 ===
Week	Honor	Player	Team	Ref.
1	Winner	(Iceland) Gunny Jónsdóttir	Utah Royals FC	
1	Nominees	(Brazil) Debinha	North Carolina Courage	
1	Nominees	(United States) Megan Rapinoe	Seattle Reign FC	
1	Nominees	(United States) Joanna Lohman	Washington Spirit	
2	Winner	(United States) Lindsey Horan	Portland Thorns FC	
2	Nominees	(United States) Jess McDonald	North Carolina Courage	
2	Nominees	(United States) Mallory Pugh	Washington Spirit	
2	Nominees	(United States) Alyssa Mautz	Chicago Red Stars	
3	Winner	(United States) Lindsey Horan (2)	Portland Thorns FC	
3	Nominees	(United States) Danielle Colaprico	Chicago Red Stars	
3	Nominees	(United States) Mallory Pugh	Washington Spirit	
3	Nominees	(United States) McCall Zerboni	North Carolina Courage	
4	Winner	(United States) Merritt Mathias	North Carolina Courage	
4	Nominees	(United States) Brittany Ratcliffe	Utah Royals FC	
4	Nominees	(United States) Sofia Huerta	Chicago Red Stars	
4	Nominees	(United States) Savannah McCaskill	Sky Blue FC	
5	Winner	(United States) Tobin Heath	Portland Thorns FC	
5	Nominees	(United States) Kristen Hamilton	North Carolina Courage	
5	Nominees	(United States) Marta	Orlando Pride	
5	Nominees	(United States) Amy Rodriguez	Utah Royals FC	
6	Winner	(Canada) Diana Matheson	Utah Royals FC	
6	Nominees	(Australia) Sam Kerr	Chicago Red Stars	
6	Nominees	(England) Chioma Ubogagu	Orlando Pride	
6	Nominees	(Japan) Rumi Utsugi	Seattle Reign FC	
7	Winner	(United States) Christine Nairn	Orlando Pride	
7	Nominees	(United States) Kristie Mewis	Houston Dash	
7	Nominees	(United States) Megan Rapinoe	Seattle Reign FC	
7	Nominees	(United States) Savannah McCaskill	Sky Blue FC	
8	Winner	(United States) Carli Lloyd	Sky Blue FC	
8	Nominees	(United States) Erika Tymrak	Utah Royals FC	
8	Nominees	(Australia) Ellie Carpenter	Portland Thorns FC	
8	Nominees	(United States) Crystal Dunn	North Carolina Courage	
9	Winner	(United States) Sydney Leroux	Orlando Pride	
9	Nominees	(United States) Jessica McDonald	North Carolina Courage	
9	Nominees	(Canada) Christine Sinclair	Portland Thorns FC	
9	Nominees	(United States) Kealia Ohai	Houston Dash	
10	Winner	(United States) Katherine Reynolds	Portland Thorns FC	
10	Nominees	(United States) Shea Groom	Sky Blue FC	
10	Nominees	(Japan) Yūki Nagasato	Chicago Red Stars	
10	Nominees	(United States) Frannie Crouse	North Carolina Courage	
11/12	Winner	(United States) Brittany Ratcliffe	Utah Royals FC	|
11/12	Nominees	(United States) Savannah McCaskill	Sky Blue FC	|
11/12	Nominees	(United States) Sydney Leroux	Orlando Pride	|
11/12	Nominees	(United States) Lindsey Horan	Portland Thorns FC	|
13	Winner	(Australia) Alanna Kennedy	Orlando Pride	
13	Nominees	(Canada) Christine Sinclair	Portland Thorns FC	
13	Nominees	(United States) Merritt Mathias	North Carolina Courage	
13	Nominees	(United States) Vanessa DiBernardo	Chicago Red Stars	
14	Winner	(United States) Kealia Ohai	Houston Dash	
14	Nominees	(United States) Jessica McDonald	North Carolina Courage	
14	Nominees	(England) Jodie Taylor	Seattle Reign FC	
14	Nominees	(Japan) Yūki Nagasato	Chicago Red Stars	
15	Winner	(Brazil) Marta	Orlando Pride	
15	Nominees	(United States) Lynn Williams	North Carolina Courage	
15	Nominees	(United States) Tobin Heath	Portland Thorns FC	
15	Nominees	(Australia) Sam Kerr	Chicago Red Stars	
16	Winner	(United States) Kristen Edmonds	Orlando Pride	
16	Nominees	(United States) Megan Rapinoe	Seattle Reign FC	
16	Nominees	(Australia) Sam Kerr	Chicago Red Stars	
16	Nominees	(United States) Lindsey Horan	Portland Thorns FC	
17	Winner	(United States) Toni Pressley	Orlando Pride	
17	Nominees	(England) Jodie Taylor	Seattle Reign FC	
17	Nominees	(Australia) Hayley Raso	Portland Thorns FC	
17	Nominees	(England) Rachel Daly	Houston Dash	
18	Not awarded			
19	Winner	(United States) Katie Stengel	Utah Royals FC	
19	Nominees	(United States) Lynn Williams	North Carolina Courage	
19	Nominees	(United States) Lindsey Horan	Portland Thorns FC	
19	Nominees	(United States) Jasmyne Spencer	Seattle Reign FC	
20	Winner	(Australia) Hayley Raso	Portland Thorns FC	
20	Nominees	(United States) Katie Stengel	Utah Royals FC	
20	Nominees	(Australia) Sam Kerr	Chicago Red Stars	
20	Nominees	(Wales) Jess Fishlock	Seattle Reign FC	
21	Winner	(Canada) Christine Sinclair	Portland Thorns FC	
21	Nominees	(United States) Kealia Ohai	Houston Dash	
21	Nominees	(United States) Amy Rodriguez	Utah Royals FC	
21	Nominees	(Australia) Sam Kerr	Chicago Red Stars	
22	Winner	(United States) Tobin Heath (2)	Portland Thorns FC	
22	Nominees	(England) Jodie Taylor	Seattle Reign FC	
22	Nominees	(Australia) Sam Kerr	Chicago Red Stars	
22	Nominees	(United States) Sofia Huerta	Houston Dash	
23	Not awarded			
24	Winner	(United States) Lindsey Horan (3)	Portland Thorns FC	
24	Nominees	(United States) Carli Lloyd	Sky Blue FC	
24	Nominees	(United States) Amy Rodriguez	Utah Royals FC	
24	Nominees	(United States) Jess McDonald	North Carolina Courage	

=== 2019 ===
Week	Honor	Player	Team	Ref.
1	Winner	(United States) Tobin Heath	Portland Thorns FC	
1	Nominees	(United States) Crystal Dunn	North Carolina Courage	
1	Nominees	(United States) Megan Crosson	Washington Spirit	
1	Nominees	(Canada) Nichelle Prince	Houston Dash	
2	Winner	(United States) Alanna Kennedy	Orlando Pride	
2	Nominees	(Canada) Christine Sinclair	Portland Thorns FC	
2	Nominees	(United States) Lo'eau LaBonta	Utah Royals FC	
2	Nominees	(United States) Bethany Balcer	Reign FC	
3	Winner	(United States) Tobin Heath (2)	Portland Thorns FC	
3	Nominees	(United States) Christen Press	Utah Royals FC	
3	Nominees	(Japan) Yūki Nagasato	Chicago Red Stars	
3	Nominees	(United States) Crystal Dunn	North Carolina Courage	
4 (Note: Only two goals were scored in week 4 of the 2019 NWSL season, hence only two goals were nominated.)	Winner	(United States) Kealia Ohai	Houston Dash	
4	Nominees	(United States) Amy Rodriguez	Utah Royals FC	
5	Winner	(Brazil) Andressinha	Portland Thorns FC	
5	Nominees	(Jamaica) Cheyna Matthews	Washington Spirit	
5	Nominees	(United States) Amy Rodriguez	Utah Royals FC	
5	Nominees	(Australia) Sam Kerr	Chicago Red Stars	
6	Winner	(United States) Jordan DiBiasi	Washington Spirit	
6	Nominees	(Costa Rica) Raquel Rodríguez	Portland Thorns FC	
6	Nominees	(United States) Amy Rodriguez	Utah Royals FC	
6	Nominees	(United States) Elizabeth Eddy	Sky Blue FC	
7	Winner	(United States) Bethany Balcer	Reign FC	
7	Nominees	(United States) Midge Purce	Portland Thorns FC	
7	Nominees	(United States) Makenzy Doniak	Utah Royals FC	
7	Nominees	(United States) Ashley Hatch	Washington Spirit	
8	Winner	(United States) Midge Purce	Portland Thorns FC	
8	Nominees	(United States) Ashley Hatch	Washington Spirit	
8	Nominees	(United States) Kristen Hamilton	North Carolina Courage	
8	Nominees	(United States) Christine Nairn	Houston Dash	
9	Winner	(United States) Amy Rodriguez	Utah Royals FC	
9	Nominees	(United States) Midge Purce	Portland Thorns FC	
9	Nominees	(United States) Joanna Boyles	Orlando Pride	
9	Nominees	(Sweden) Julia Spetsmark	North Carolina Courage	
10 (Note: No other goals were nominated in week 10 of the 2019 season.)	Winner	(Wales) Jess Fishlock	Reign FC	
11	Winner	(United States) Tyler Lussi	Portland Thorns FC	
11	Nominees	(Australia) Sam Kerr	Chicago Red Stars	
11	Nominees	(Wales) Jess Fishlock	Reign FC	
11	Nominees	(United States) Leah Pruitt	North Carolina Courage	
12	Winner	(Brazil) Marta	Orlando Pride	
12	Nominees	(United States) Kristen Hamilton	North Carolina Courage	
12	Nominees	(Spain) Celia	Reign FC	
12	Nominees	(United States) Bayley Feist	Washington Spirit	
13	Winner	(United States) Tyler Lussi (2)	Portland Thorns FC	
13	Nominees	(Brazil) Marta	Orlando Pride	
13	Nominees	(Brazil) Debinha	North Carolina Courage	
13	Nominees	(United States) Jen Hoy	Sky Blue FC	
14	Winner	(United States) Christen Press	Utah Royals FC	
14	Nominees	(United States) Christine Sinclair	Portland Thorns FC	
14	Nominees	(United States) Marisa Viggiano	Orlando Pride	
14	Nominees	(Australia) Sam Kerr	Chicago Red Stars	
15	Winner	(United States) Christen Press (2)	Utah Royals FC	
15	Nominees	(Australia) Hayley Raso	Portland Thorns FC	
15	Nominees	(United States) Kristen Hamilton	North Carolina Courage	
15	Nominees	(Japan) Yūki Nagasato	Chicago Red Stars	
16	Winner	(Australia) Sam Kerr	Chicago Red Stars	
16	Nominees	(New Zealand) Rosie White	Reign FC	
16	Nominees	(Brazil) Debinha	North Carolina Courage	
16	Nominees	(United States) Imani Dorsey	Sky Blue FC	
17	Winner	(United States) Amy Rodriguez (2)	Utah Royals FC	
17	Nominees	(Japan) Yūki Nagasato	Portland Thorns FC	
17	Nominees	(United States) Crystal Dunn	North Carolina Courage	
17	Nominees	(Japan) Shea Groom	Reign FC	
18	Winner	(United States) Christen Press (3)	Utah Royals FC	
18	Nominees	(Australia) Sam Kerr	Chicago Red Stars	
18	Nominees	(United States) Paige Monaghan	Sky Blue FC	
18	Nominees	(United States) Andi Sullivan	Washington Spirit	

=== 2024 ===
Week	Honor	Nat.	Player	Team	Ref.
1	Winner	(Nigeria)	Asisat Oshoala	Bay FC	
1	Nominees	(Canada)	Janine Beckie	Portland Thorns FC	
1	Nominees	(Colombia)	Elexa Bahr	Racing Louisville FC	
1	Nominees	(United States)	Ally Schlegel	Chicago Red Stars	
2	Winner	(South Korea)	Ji So-yun	Seattle Reign FC	
2	Nominees	(United States)	Hal Hershfelt	Washington Spirit	
2	Nominees	(Brazil)	Marta	Orlando Pride	
2	Nominees	(United States)	Ally Sentnor	Utah Royals	
3	Winner	(United States)	Sam Coffey	Portland Thorns FC	
3	Nominees	(Zambia)	Racheal Kundananji	Bay FC	
3	Nominees	(Jamaica)	Havana Solaun	Houston Dash	
3	Nominees	(Australia)	Emily van Egmond	San Diego Wave FC	
4	Winner	(United States)	Alex Loera	Bay FC	
4	Nominees	(Malawi)	Temwa Chawinga	Kansas City Current	
4	Nominees	(Brazil)	Marta	Orlando Pride	
4	Nominees	(United States)	Brittany Ratcliffe	Washington Spirit	
5	Winner	(United States)	Tziarra King	Seattle Reign FC	
5	Nominees	(United States)	Croix Bethune	Washington Spirit	
5	Nominees	(Scotland)	Claire Emslie	Angel City FC	
5	Nominees	(United States)	Mallory Swanson	Chicago Red Stars	
6	Winner	(United States)	Sophia Smith	Portland Thorns FC	
6	Nominees	(United States)	Vanessa DiBernardo	Kansas City Current	
6	Nominees	(France)	Ouleymata Sarr	Washington Spirit	
6	Nominees	(United States)	Reilyn Turner	Racing Louisville FC	
7	Winner	(United States)	Veronica Latsko	Seattle Reign FC	
7	Nominees	(Zambia)	Barbra Banda	Orlando Pride	
7	Nominees	(Zambia)	Racheal Kundananji	Bay FC	
7	Nominees	(United States)	Brittany Ratcliffe	Washington Spirit	
8	Winner	(United States)	Ella Stevens	NJ/NY Gotham FC	
8	Nominees	(United States)	Savannah DeMelo	Racing Louisville FC	
8	Nominees	(United States)	Olivia Moultrie	Portland Thorns FC	
8	Nominees	(United States)	Cameron Tucker	Utah Royals	
9	Winner	(United States)	Emma Sears	Racing Louisville FC	
9	Nominees	(United States)	Savannah DeMelo	Racing Louisville FC	
9	Nominees	(United States)	Emily Sams	Orlando Pride	
9	Nominees	(United States)	Lynn Williams	NJ/NY Gotham FC	
10	Winner	(United States)	Emma Sears (2)	Racing Louisville FC	
10	Nominees	(United States)	Emeri Adames	Seattle Reign FC	
10	Nominees	(United States)	Veronica Latsko	Seattle Reign FC	
10	Nominees	(Venezuela)	Bárbara Olivieri	Houston Dash	
11	Winner	(United States)	Rose Lavelle	NJ/NY Gotham FC	
11	Nominees	(United States)	Vanessa DiBernardo	Kansas City Current	
11	Nominees	(United States)	Julie Doyle	Orlando Pride	
11	Nominees	(United States)	Kiki Pickett	Bay FC	
12	Winner	(United States)	Croix Bethune	Washington Spirit	
12	Nominees	(United States)	Kate Del Fava	Utah Royals	
12	Nominees	(United States)	Ella Stevens	NJ/NY Gotham FC	
12	Nominees	(United States)	Mallory Swanson	Chicago Red Stars	
13	Winner	(United States)	Trinity Rodman	Washington Spirit	
13	Nominees	(United States)	Maycee Bell	NJ/NY Gotham FC	
13	Nominees	(United States)	Lo'eau LaBonta	Kansas City Current	
13	Nominees	(United States)	Reilyn Turner	Racing Louisville FC	
14	Winner	(United States)	Mallory Swanson	Chicago Red Stars	
14	Nominees	(Brazil)	Adriana	Orlando Pride	
14	Nominees	(Zambia)	Barbra Banda	Orlando Pride	
14	Nominees	(Malawi)	Temwa Chawinga	Kansas City Current	
15	Winner	(United States)	Mallory Swanson (2)	Chicago Red Stars	
15	Nominees	(Malawi)	Temwa Chawinga	Kansas City Current	
15	Nominees	(United States)	Rose Lavelle	NJ/NY Gotham FC	
15	Nominees	(Japan)	Manaka Matsukubo	North Carolina Courage	
16	Winner	(United States)	Jameese Joseph	Chicago Red Stars	
16	Nominees	(United States)	Yazmeen Ryan	NJ/NY Gotham FC	
16	Nominees	(United States)	Ella Stevens	NJ/NY Gotham FC	
16	Nominees	(United States)	Alyssa Thompson	Angel City FC	
17	Winner	(South Korea)	Ji So-yun (2)	Seattle Reign FC	
17	Nominees	(Brazil)	Adriana	Orlando Pride	
17	Nominees	(Malawi)	Temwa Chawinga	Kansas City Current	
17	Nominees	(Australia)	Cortnee Vine	North Carolina Courage	
18	Winner	(Brazil)	Marta	Orlando Pride	
18	Nominees	(Malawi)	Temwa Chawinga	Kansas City Current	
18	Nominees	(United States)	Trinity Rodman	Washington Spirit	
18	Nominees	(South Korea)	Ji So-yun	Seattle Reign FC	
19	Winner	(United States)	Trinity Rodman (2)	Washington Spirit	
19	Nominees	(United States)	Bethany Balcer	Racing Louisville FC	
19	Nominees	(Canada)	Cloé Lacasse	Utah Royals	
19	Nominees	(United States)	Ashley Sanchez	North Carolina Courage	
20	Winner	(Japan)	Yūki Nagasato	Houston Dash	
20	Nominees	(United States)	Lo'eau LaBonta	Kansas City Current	
20	Nominees	(United States)	Yazmeen Ryan	NJ/NY Gotham FC	
20	Nominees	(United States)	Alyssa Thompson	Angel City FC	
21	Winner	(Spain)	Ana Tejada	Utah Royals	
21	Nominees	(Brazil)	Angelina	Orlando Pride	
21	Nominees	(Brazil)	Ludmila	Chicago Red Stars	
21	Nominees	(Republic of Ireland)	Denise O'Sullivan	North Carolina Courage	
22	Winner	(Japan)	Manaka Matsukubo	North Carolina Courage	
22	Nominees	(United States)	Hannah Betfort	Utah Royals	
22	Nominees	(United States)	Vanessa DiBernardo	Kansas City Current	
22	Nominees	(United States)	M.A. Vignola	Angel City FC	
23	Winner	(United States)	Christen Press	Angel City FC	
23	Nominees	(Malawi)	Temwa Chawinga	Kansas City Current	
23	Nominees	(Canada)	Cloé Lacasse	Utah Royals	
23	Nominees	(Canada)	Christine Sinclair	Portland Thorns FC	
24	Winner	(United States)	Sydney Leroux	Angel City FC	
24	Nominees	(United States)	Olivia Athens	Seattle Reign FC	
24	Nominees	(France)	Delphine Cascarino	San Diego Wave FC	
24	Nominees	(Spain)	Claudia Zornoza	Utah Royals	
25	Winner	(United States)	Mandy Freeman	NJ/NY Gotham FC	
25	Nominees	(Canada)	Christine Sinclair	Portland Thorns FC	
25	Nominees	(United States)	Ashley Hatch	Washington Spirit	
25	Nominees	(Spain)	Esther	NJ/NY Gotham FC	

=== 2025 ===
Week	Honor	Nat.	Player	Team	Ref.
1	Winner	(United States)	Kiki Pickett	Bay FC	
1	Nominees	(Zambia)	Barbra Banda	Orlando Pride	
1	Nominees	(United States)	Michelle Cooper	Kansas City Current	
1	Nominees	(Brazil)	Gabi Portilho	Gotham FC	
2	Winner	(United States)	Jordyn Bugg	Seattle Reign FC	
2	Nominees	(United States)	Kennedy Fuller	Angel City FC	
2	Nominees	(United States)	Karlie Lema	Bay FC	
2	Nominees	(Spain)	Claudia Zornoza	Utah Royals	
3	Winner	(United States)	Alyssa Thompson	Angel City FC	
3	Nominees	(United States)	Ashley Hatch	Washington Spirit	
3	Nominees	(Nigeria)	Chiamaka Okwuchukwu	San Diego Wave FC	
3	Nominees	(United States)	Emma Sears	Racing Louisville FC	
4	Winner	(Colombia)	Leicy Santos	Washington Spirit	
4	Nominees	(Brazil)	Debinha	Kansas City Current	
4	Nominees	(Spain)	Esther González	Gotham FC	
4	Nominees	(Brazil)	Ludmila	Chicago Stars FC	
5	Winner	(United States)	Kiki Pickett (2)	Bay FC	
5	Nominees	(United States)	Maddie Dahlien	Portland Thorns FC	
5	Nominees	(France)	Kenza Dali	San Diego Wave FC	
5	Nominees	(Brazil)	Geyse	Gotham FC	
6	Winner	(United States)	Reilyn Turner	Portland Thorns FC	
6	Nominees	(Zambia)	Barbra Banda	Orlando Pride	
6	Nominees	(United States)	Emma Sears	Racing Louisville FC	
6	Nominees	(United States)	Delanie Sheehan	Houston Dash	
7	Winner	(United States)	Gisele Thompson	Angel City FC	
7	Nominees	(United States)	Avery Patterson	Houston Dash	
7	Nominees	(Mexico)	Reyna Reyes	Portland Thorns FC	
7	Nominees	(England)	Katie Zelem	Angel City FC	
8	Winner	(United States)	Christen Press	Angel City FC	
8	Nominees	(Brazil)	Debinha	Kansas City Current	
8	Nominees	(United States)	Taylor Flint	Racing Louisville FC	
8	Nominees	(Canada)	Julia Grosso	Chicago Stars FC	
9	Winner	(United States)	Casey Krueger	Washington Spirit	
9	Nominees	(United States)	Ashley Hatch	Washington Spirit	
9	Nominees	(Japan)	Manaka Matsukubo	North Carolina Courage	
9	Nominees	(United States)	Pietra Tordin	Portland Thorns FC	
10	Winner	(Canada)	Adriana Leon	San Diego Wave FC	
10	Nominees	(United States)	Penelope Hocking	Bay FC	
10	Nominees	(United States)	Avery Patterson	Houston Dash	
10	Nominees	(United States)	Riley Tiernan	Angel City FC	
11	Winner	(United States)	Emma Sears	Racing Louisville FC	
11	Nominees	(Japan)	Manaka Matsukubo	North Carolina Courage	
11	Nominees	(United States)	Sally Menti	Seattle Reign FC	
11	Nominees	(United States)	Ally Schlegel	Chicago Stars FC	
12	Winner	(Brazil)	Ludmila	Chicago Stars FC	
12	Nominees	(United States)	Brianna Pinto	North Carolina Courage	
12	Nominees	(Venezuela)	Bárbara Olivieri	Houston Dash	
12	Nominees	(United States)	Pietra Tordin	Portland Thorns FC	
13	Winner	(Brazil)	Geyse	Gotham FC	
13	Nominees	(South Korea)	Ji So-yun	Seattle Reign FC	
13	Nominees	(United States)	Arin Wright	Racing Louisville FC	
13	Nominees	(Brazil)	Bia Zaneratto	Kansas City Current	
14	Winner	(United States)	Trinity Rodman	Washington Spirit	
14	Nominees	(Wales)	Jess Fishlock	Seattle Reign FC	
14	Nominees	(United States)	Olivia Moultrie	Portland Thorns FC	
14	Nominees	(Japan)	Mina Tanaka	Utah Royals	
15	Winner	(Jamaica)	Kiki Van Zanten	Houston Dash	
15	Nominees	(Wales)	Jess Fishlock	Seattle Reign FC	
15	Nominees	(United States)	Shea Groom	Chicago Stars FC	
15	Nominees	(Australia)	Alanna Kennedy	Angel City FC	
16	Winner	(United States)	Alyssa Naeher	Chicago Stars FC	
16	Nominees	(Italy)	Sofia Cantore	Washington Spirit	
16	Nominees	(France)	Kenza Dali	San Diego Wave FC	
16	Nominees	(Ivory Coast)	Rosemonde Kouassi	Washington Spirit	
17	Winner	(Brazil)	Ludmila (2)	Chicago Stars FC	
17	Nominees	(United States)	Croix Bethune	Washington Spirit	
17	Nominees	(Japan)	Manaka Matsukubo	North Carolina Courage	
17	Nominees	(United States)	Alyssa Thompson	Angel City FC	
18	Winner	(United States)	Riley Tiernan	Angel City FC	
18	Nominees	(United States)	Jaelin Howell	Gotham FC	
18	Nominees	(Brazil)	Ludmila	Chicago Stars FC	
18	Nominees	(United States)	Paige Monaghan	Utah Royals	
19	Winner	(United States)	Trinity Rodman (2)	Washington Spirit	
19	Nominees	(United States)	Jaelin Howell	Gotham FC	
19	Nominees	(United States)	Carson Pickett	Orlando Pride	
19	Nominees	(United States)	Sam Staab	Chicago Stars FC	
20	Winner	(United States)	Olivia Moultrie	Portland Thorns FC	
20	Nominees	(Japan)	Manaka Matsukubo	North Carolina Courage	
20	Nominees	(United States)	Paige Monaghan	Utah Royals	
20	Nominees	(United States)	Jaedyn Shaw	Gotham FC	
21	Winner	(Japan)	Mina Tanaka	Utah Royals	
21	Nominees	(Canada)	Cloé Lacasse	Utah Royals	
21	Nominees	(Zambia)	Racheal Kundananji	Bay FC	
21	Nominees	(Canada)	Janine Sonis	Racing Louisville FC	
22	Winner	(Italy)	Sofia Cantore	Washington Spirit	
22	Nominees	(Brazil)	Dudinha	San Diego Wave FC	
22	Nominees	(Nigeria)	Gift Monday	Washington Spirit	
22	Nominees	(Mexico)	Lizbeth Ovalle	Orlando Pride	
23	Winner	(Ivory Coast)	Rosemonde Kouassi	Washington Spirit	
23	Nominees	(United States)	Simone Charley	Orlando Pride	
23	Nominees	(United States)	Olivia Moultrie	Portland Thorns FC	
23	Nominees	(Japan)	Mina Tanaka	Utah Royals	
24	Winner	(United States)	Trinity Rodman (3)	Washington Spirit	
24	Nominees	(United States)	Bethany Balcer	Racing Louisville FC	
24	Nominees	(Brazil)	Maiara Niehues	Angel City FC	
24	Nominees	(Denmark)	Janni Thomsen	Utah Royals	
25	Winner	(Italy)	Sofia Cantore (2)	Washington Spirit	
25	Nominees	(United States)	Kerry Abello	Orlando Pride	
25	Nominees	(United States)	Rose Lavelle	Gotham FC	
25	Nominees	(United States)	Olivia Moultrie	Portland Thorns FC	
25	Winner	(Venezuela)	Deyna Castellanos	Portland Thorns FC	
25	Nominees	(Brazil)	Debinha	Kansas City Current	
25	Nominees	(Brazil)	Dudinha	San Diego Wave FC	
25	Nominees	(Japan)	Manaka Matsukubo	North Carolina Courage	

=== 2026 ===
Week	Honor	Nat.	Player	Team	Ref.
1	Winner	(United States)	Ashley Sanchez	North Carolina Courage	
1	Nominees	(Germany)	Melissa Kössler	Denver Summit FC	
1	Nominees	(United States)	Olivia Moultrie	Portland Thorns FC	
1	Nominees	(Brazil)	Maiara Niehues	Angel City FC	
2	Winner	(Italy)	Sofia Cantore	Washington Spirit	
2	Nominees	(Canada)	Jordyn Huitema	Chicago Stars FC	
2	Nominees	(United States)	Emma Sears	Racing Louisville FC	
2	Nominees	(Jamaica)	Kiki van Zanten	Houston Dash	
3	Winner	(United States)	Melanie Barcenas	San Diego Wave FC	
3	Nominees	(Wales)	Angharad James-Turner	Seattle Reign FC	
3	Nominees	(Iceland)	Sveindís Jónsdóttir	Angel City FC	
3	Nominees	(Mexico)	Jacquie Ovalle	Orlando Pride	
4	Winner	(United States)	Gisele Thompson	Angel City FC	
4	Nominees	(Brazil)	Ludmila	San Diego Wave FC	
4	Nominees	(United States)	Ashley Sanchez	North Carolina Courage	
4	Nominees	(United States)	Reilyn Turner	Portland Thorns FC	
5	Winner	(United States)	Sophia Wilson	Portland Thorns FC	
5	Nominees	(United States)	Paige Cronin	Utah Royals	
5	Nominees	(United States)	Lauren Milliet	Racing Louisville FC	
5	Nominees	(Japan)	Narumi Miura	Utah Royals	
6	Winner	(Mali)	Aïssata Traoré	Boston Legacy FC	
6	Nominees	(Italy)	Sofia Cantore	Washington Spirit	
6	Nominees	(Germany)	Marie Müller	Portland Thorns FC	
6	Nominees	(United States)	Yazmeen Ryan	Denver Summit FC	
7	Winner	(United States)	Katie O'Kane	Racing Louisville FC	
7	Nominees	(Zambia)	Barbra Banda	Orlando Pride	
7	Nominees	(Paraguay)	Claudia Martínez	Washington Spirit	
7	Nominees	(Jamaica)	Mimi Van Zanten	San Diego Wave FC	
8	Winner	(Japan)	Manaka Matsukubo	North Carolina Courage	
8	Nominees	(United States)	Kimmi Ascanio	San Diego Wave FC	
8	Nominees	(Malawi)	Temwa Chawinga	Kansas City Current	
8	Nominees	(Canada)	Janine Sonis	Denver Summit FC	
9	Winner	(United States)	M.A. Vignola	Portland Thorns FC	
9	Nominees	(United States)	Mallory Swanson	Chicago Stars FC	
9	Nominees	(United States)	Kennedy Fuller	Angel City FC	
9	Nominees	(United States)	Kat Rader	Houston Dash	
10	Winner	(Colombia)	Leicy Santos	Washington Spirit	
10	Nominees	(United States)	Cori Dyke	Orlando Pride	
10	Nominees	(Mexico)	Kiana Palacios	Utah Royals	
10	Nominees	(United States)	Jordynn Dudley	Gotham FC	
11	Winner	(United States)	Melanie Barcenas (2)	San Diego Wave FC	
11	Nominees	(United States)	Sam Staab	Chicago Stars FC	
11	Nominees	(United States)	Sophia Wilson	Portland Thorns FC	
11	Nominees	(Brazil)	Amanda Gutierres	Boston Legacy FC	
12	Winner	(Colombia)	Leicy Santos (2)	Washington Spirit	
12	Nominees	(Canada)	Nichelle Prince	Boston Legacy FC	
12	Nominees	(United States)	Ryanne Brown	Seattle Reign FC	
12	Nominees	(United States)	Yazmeen Ryan	Denver Summit FC	
13	Winner	(United States)	Rose Lavelle	Gotham FC	
13	Nominees	(Japan)	Narumi Miura	Utah Royals	
13	Nominees	(Canada)	Janine Sonis	Denver Summit FC	
13	Nominees	(United States)	Trinity Byars	San Diego Wave FC	
14	Winner	(Italy)	Sofia Cantore (2)	Washington Spirit	
14	Nominees	(United States)	Renee Lyles	Portland Thorns FC	
14	Nominees	(Japan)	Mina Tanaka	Utah Royals	
14	Nominees	(United States)	Kate Del Fava	Utah Royals	
15	Winner	(Mexico)	Kiana Palacios	Utah Royals	
15	Nominees	(Brazil)	Debinha	Kansas City Current	
15	Nominees	(United States)	Hannah Bebar	Bay FC	
15	Nominees	(United States)	Ashley Sanchez	North Carolina Courage	
16	Winner	(United States)	Ashley Sanchez (2)	North Carolina Courage	
16	Nominees	(United States)	Mia Fishel	Seattle Reign FC	
16	Nominees	(Canada)	Janine Sonis	Denver Summit FC	
16	Nominees	(United States)	Pietra Tordin	Portland Thorns FC	

== Multiple winners ==
As of August 11, 2026

The below table lists those who have won on more than one occasion.

*	Indicates current NWSL player
Italics	Indicates players still playing professional soccer

Rank	Player	Club(s)	Wins
1	(United States) Christen Press	Chicago Stars FC, (Note: Chicago Stars FC was previously known as Chicago Red Stars) Utah Royals, Angel City FC	11
2	(United States) Tobin Heath	Portland Thorns FC	5
2	(United States) Trinity Rodman*	Washington Spirit	5
4	(Italy) Sofia Cantore*	Washington Spirit	4
4	(England) Rachel Daly	Houston Dash	4
4	(United States) Lindsey Heaps* (née Horan)	Portland Thorns FC	4
4	(United States) Marta*	Orlando Pride	4
8	(Australia) Alanna Kennedy	Orlando Pride	3
8	(Australia) Sam Kerr*	NJ/NY Gotham FC (Note: Gotham FC was previously known as Sky Blue FC and NJ/NY Gotham FC), Chicago Stars FC	3
8	(United States) Alex Morgan	Orlando Pride	3
8	(Colombia) Leicy Santos*	Washington Spirit	3
8	(United States) Emma Sears*	Racing Louisville FC	3
8	(United States) Kealia Watt (née Ohai)	Houston Dash	3
14	(United States) Melanie Barcenas*	San Diego Wave FC	2
14	(Brazil) Camila	Orlando Pride	2
14	(United States) Kristen Edmonds	Orlando Pride	2
14	(Wales) Jess Fishlock*	Seattle Reign FC (Note: Seattle Reign FC was previously known as OL Reign and OL Reign)	2
14	(United States) Sofia Huerta*	Chicago Stars FC	2
14	(United States) Rose Lavelle*	NJ/NY Gotham FC	2
14	(United States) Sydney Leroux*	Orlando Pride, Angel City FC	2
14	(Brazil) Ludmila*	Chicago Stars FC	2
14	(United States) Tyler Lussi*	Portland Thorns FC	2
14	(Japan) Manaka Matsukubo	North Carolina Courage	2
14	(United States) Christine Nairn	Washington Spirit, Orlando Pride	2
14	(United States) Kiki Pickett*	Bay FC	2
14	(United States) Toni Pressley	Orlando Pride	2
14	(United States) Amy Rodriguez	Utah Royals	2
14	(United States) Ashley Sanchez*	North Carolina Courage	2
14	(United States) Becky Sauerbrunn	FC Kansas City	2
14	(Canada) Christine Sinclair	Portland Thorns FC	2
14	(South Korea) Ji So-yun	Seattle Reign FC	2
14	(United States) Mallory Swanson* (née Pugh)	Chicago Stars FC	2
14	(United States) Gisele Thompson*	Angel City FC	2
14	(United States) Sophia Wilson* (née Smith)	Portland Thorns FC	2

== See also ==
- List of sports awards honoring women
- NWSL awards
- NWSL records and statistics
- Women's soccer in the United States
