= Mina Tanaka =

Japanese footballer (born 1994)

Mina Tanaka 田中 美南
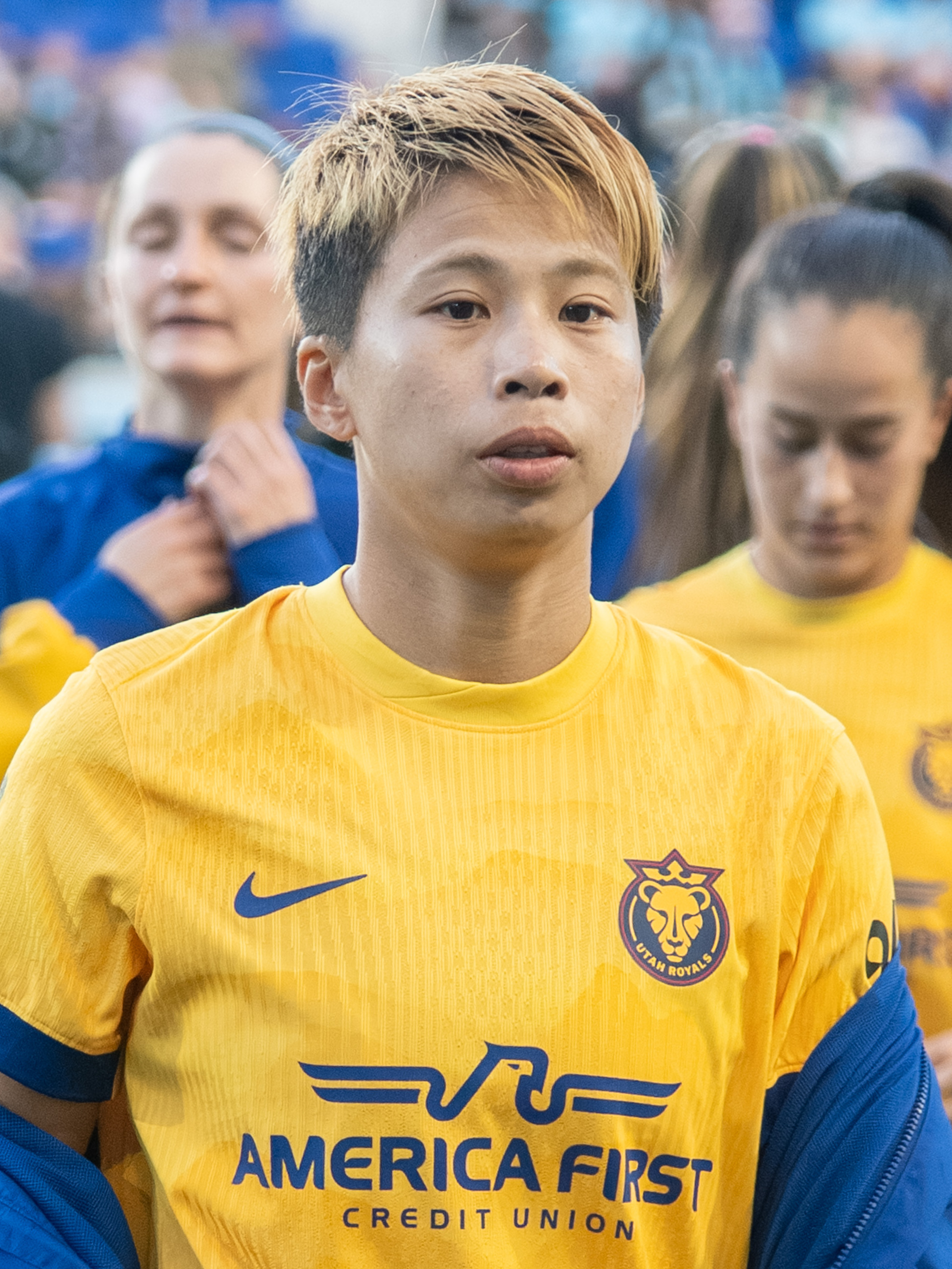
- Tanaka with the Utah Royals in 2025

Personal information
- Date of birth: April 28, 1994 (age 32)
- Place of birth: Ubon Ratchathani, Thailand
- Height: 1.64 m (5 ft 5 in)
- Positions: Attacking midfielder; forward

Team information
- Current team: Utah Royals FC
- Number: 11

Youth career
- 2007–2011: NTV Tokyo Verdy Beleza

Senior career*
Years	Team	Apps	(Gls)
2011–2019	NTV Tokyo Verdy Beleza	153	(98)
2020–2024	INAC Kobe Leonessa	58	(37)
2021	→ Bayer Leverkusen (loan)	10	(4)
2024–	Utah Royals	54	(16)

International career^{‡}
2010	Japan U-17	3	(1)
2012	Japan U-20	6	(0)
2013–	Japan	101	(43)
Medal record
Women's football
Representing Japan
AFC Women's Asian Cup
Winner	2026 Australia
Winner	2018 Jordan
Asian Games
Gold medal – first place	2018 Jakarta-Palembang	Team
FIFA U-20 Women's World Cup
Bronze medal – third place	2012 Japan
FIFA U-17 Women's World Cup
Runner-up	2010 Trinidad and Tobago
AFC U-16 Women's Championship
Bronze medal – third place	2009 Thailand
- * Club domestic league appearances and goals as of 04:27, 10 November 2026 (UTC) ‡ National team caps and goals as of 02:14, 13 April 2026 (UTC)

Mina Tanaka (田中 美南, Tanaka Mina; born April 28, 1994) is a professional footballer who plays as an attacking midfielder or forward for National Women's Soccer League club Utah Royals and the Japan national team. She has previously played for Tokyo Verdy Beleza, Bayer Leverkusen, and INAC Kobe Leonessa.

== Early life ==
Tanaka was born in Thailand on April 28, 1994 to a Japanese father and a Thai mother. She returned to Japan soon after her birth and grew up in Kawasaki City, Kanagawa. She graduated from Kanagawa Prefectural Yurigaoka High School in March 2013.

== Club career ==
On May 3, 2011, she made her debut for Nippon TV Beleza in a 1–0 loss to Okayama Yunogo Belle. On August 14, she scored her first goal in a 5–0 home victory against Fukuoka J. Anclas. She became top scorer in 2016 and 2017. She was also selected Best Eleven for 3 years in a row (2015–2017).

In 2020, Tanaka signed for INAC Kobe Leonessa. After the season was delayed by two months due to the COVID-19 pandemic, Tanaka made her club debut in the season opener on July 18. She scored the only goal of the match. On 3 February 2020, she joined Bayer Leverkusen on loan until the end of the 2019–20 season

On July 5, 2024, NWSL club Utah Royals signed Tanaka to a contract through the 2025 NWSL season. Tanaka signed a contract extension with Utah through 2028 on August 22, 2025.

== National team career ==
Tanaka was part of the Japan U-17 national team that finished in second place at the 2010 U-17 World Cup and of the U-20 team that finished in third place at the 2012 U-20 World Cup. In February 2013, she received her first senior team call-up. On March 8, she made her debut for Japan and scored her first goal in a 2–1 loss to Germany in the 2013 Algarve Cup.

On 19 March 2018, she was called up to the 2018 AFC Women's Asian Cup, where Japan won the championship.

On 18 June 2021, she was included in the Japan squad for the 2020 Summer Olympics.

On 7 January 2022, Tanaka was called up to the 2022 AFC Women's Asian Cup squad.

On 13 June 2023, she was included in Japan's 23-player squad for the FIFA Women's World Cup 2023. On July 31, Tanaka scored in Japan's 4-0 group-stage victory in a match against Spain.

On 14 June 2024, Tanaka was included in the Japan squad for the 2024 Summer Olympics.

Tanaka was tournament MVP as part of the Japan squad that won the 2025 SheBelieves Cup. She scored four goals and had three assists across Japan's three matches of the tournament.

== Career statistics ==
=== Club ===
As of match played April 4, 2026.

Appearances and goals by club, season and competition
Club	Season	League			National Cup (Note: Includes the Empress's Cup)		League Cup (Note: Includes the Nadeshiko League Cup)		Total	
Club	Season	Division	Apps	Goals	Apps	Goals	Apps	Goals	Apps	Goals
Tokyo Verdy Beleza	2011	Nadeshiko League	7	1	3	0	—		10	1
Tokyo Verdy Beleza	2012	Nadeshiko League	15	2	2	1	2	0	19	3
Tokyo Verdy Beleza	2013	Nadeshiko League	17	10	2	0	8	7	27	17
Tokyo Verdy Beleza	2014	Nadeshiko League	21	3	4	5	—		25	8
Tokyo Verdy Beleza	2015	Nadeshiko League	23	14	4	7	—		27	21
Tokyo Verdy Beleza	2016	Nadeshiko League	18	18	4	2	9	6	31	26
Tokyo Verdy Beleza	2017	Nadeshiko League	18	15	5	7	6	6	29	28
Tokyo Verdy Beleza	2018	Nadeshiko League	18	15	5	7	5	5	28	27
Tokyo Verdy Beleza	2019	Nadeshiko League	16	20	5	4	10	10	33	34
Tokyo Verdy Beleza	Total		153	98	34	33	40	34	227	165
INAC Kobe Leonessa	2020	Nadeshiko League	18	12	3	1	—		21	13
INAC Kobe Leonessa	2021–22	WE League	18	12	1	0	—		19	12
INAC Kobe Leonessa	2022–23	WE League	19	11	2	1	4	2	25	14
INAC Kobe Leonessa	2023–24	WE League	3	2	0	0	3	1	6	3
INAC Kobe Leonessa	Total		58	37	6	2	7	3	71	42
Bayer Leverkusen (loan)	2020–21	Frauen-Bundesliga	10	4	—		—		10	4
Utah Royals	2024	NWSL	7	1	—		—		7	1
Utah Royals	2025	NWSL	23	6	—		—		23	6
Utah Royals	2026	NWSL	3	2	—		—		3	2
Utah Royals	Total		33	9	0	0	0	0	33	9
Career total			254	148	40	35	47	37	341	220

=== International ===
As of match played 11 April 2026

Appearances and goals by national team and year
National team	Year	Apps	Goals
Japan	2013	4	1
Japan	2014	0	0
Japan	2015	2	0
Japan	2016	0	0
Japan	2017	14	5
Japan	2018	15	8
Japan	2019	4	2
Japan	2020	3	0
Japan	2021	11	5
Japan	2022	9	2
Japan	2023	12	7
Japan	2024	11	5
Japan	2025	11	7
Japan	2026	5	1
Total		101	43

Scores and results list Japan's goal tally first, score column indicates score after each Tanaka goal.

List of international goals scored by Mina Tanaka
No.	Date	Venue	Opponent	Score	Result	Competition
1	8 March 2013	Bela Vista Municipal Stadium, Parchal, Portugal	Germany	1–1	1–2	2013 Algarve Cup
2	9 April 2017	Egao Kenkō Stadium, Kumamoto, Japan	Costa Rica	2–0	3–0	Friendly
3	27 July 2017	SDCCU Stadium, San Diego, United States	Australia	1–0	2–4	2017 Tournament of Nations
4	22 October 2017	Minami Nagano Sports Park Stadium, Nagano, Japan	Switzerland	2–0	2–0	Friendly
5	8 December 2017	Fukuda Denshi Arena, Chiba, Japan	South Korea	1–0	3–2	2017 EAFF E-1 Football Championship
6	11 December 2017	Fukuda Denshi Arena, Chiba, Japan	China	1–0	1–0	2017 EAFF E-1 Football Championship
7	1 April 2018	Transcosmos Stadium Nagasaki, Isahaya, Japan	Ghana	1–0	7–1	Friendly
8	7 April 2018	King Abdullah II Stadium, Amman, Jordan	Vietnam	4–0	4–0	2018 AFC Women's Asian Cup
9	10 June 2018	Wellington Regional Stadium, Wellington, New Zealand	New Zealand	1–0	3–1	Friendly
10	10 June 2018	Wellington Regional Stadium, Wellington, New Zealand	New Zealand	2–1	3–1	Friendly
11	10 June 2018	Wellington Regional Stadium, Wellington, New Zealand	New Zealand	3–1	3–1	Friendly
12	26 July 2018	Children's Mercy Park, Kansas City, United States	United States	1–1	4–2	2018 Tournament of Nations
13	21 August 2018	Gelora Sriwijaya Stadium, Palembang, Indonesia	Vietnam	4–0	7–0	2018 Asian Games
14	21 August 2018	Gelora Sriwijaya Stadium, Palembang, Indonesia	Vietnam	7–0	7–0	2018 Asian Games
15	11 December 2019	Busan Asiad Main Stadium, Busan, South Korea	Chinese Taipei	2–0	9–0	2019 EAFF E-1 Football Championship
16	11 December 2019	Busan Asiad Main Stadium, Busan, South Korea	Chinese Taipei	4–0	9–0	2019 EAFF E-1 Football Championship
17	8 April 2021	Yurtec Stadium Sendai, Sendai, Japan	Paraguay	7–0	7–0	Friendly
18	10 June 2021	Edion Stadium Hiroshima, Hiroshima, Japan	Ukraine	8–0	8–0	Friendly
19	13 June 2021	Kanseki Stadium Tochigi, Utsunomiya, Japan	Mexico	2–0	5–1	Friendly
20	27 July 2021	Miyagi Stadium, Rifu, Japan	Chile	1–0	1–0	2020 Summer Olympics
21	30 July 2021	Saitama Stadium 2002, Saitama, Japan	Sweden	1–1	1–3	2020 Summer Olympics
22	6 October 2022	Noevir Stadium Kobe, Kobe, Japan	Nigeria	1–0	2–0	Friendly
23	6 October 2022	Noevir Stadium Kobe, Kobe, Japan	Nigeria	2–0	2–0	Friendly
24	7 April 2023	Estádio D. Afonso Henriques, Guimarães, Portugal	Portugal	2–1	2–1	Friendly
25	22 July 2023	Waikato Stadium, Hamilton, New Zealand	Zambia	2–0	5–0	2023 FIFA Women's World Cup
26	31 July 2023	Wellington Regional Stadium, Wellington, New Zealand	Spain	4–0	4–0	2023 FIFA Women's World Cup
27	23 September 2023	Kitakyushu Stadium, Kitakyushu, Japan	Argentina	1–0	8–0	Friendly
28	26 October 2023	Lokomotiv Stadium, Tashkent, Uzbekistan	India	4–0	7–0	2024 AFC Women's Olympic Qualifying Tournament
29	30 November 2023	Arena Corinthians, São Paulo, Brazil	Brazil	3–3	3–4	Friendly
30	3 December 2023	Estádio do Morumbi, São Paulo, Brazil	Brazil	2–0	2–0	Friendly
31	9 April 2024	Lower.com Field, Columbus, United States	Brazil	1–0	1–1 (0–3 p)	2024 SheBelieves Cup
32	31 May 2024	Estadio Nueva Condomina, Murcia, Spain	New Zealand	1–0	2–0	Friendly
33	13 July 2024	Kanazawa Go Go Curry Stadium, Kanazawa, Japan	Ghana	1–0	4–0	Friendly
34	31 July 2024	Stade de la Beaujoire, Nantes, France	Nigeria	2–0	3–1	2024 Summer Olympics
35	26 October 2024	Japan National Stadium, Tokyo, Japan	South Korea	3–0	4–0	Friendly
36	20 February 2025	Shell Energy Stadium, Houston, United States	Australia	1–0	4–0	2025 SheBelieves Cup
37	20 February 2025	Shell Energy Stadium, Houston, United States	Australia	2–0	4–0	2025 SheBelieves Cup
38	23 February 2025	State Farm Stadium, Glendale, United States	Colombia	2–0	4–1	2025 SheBelieves Cup
39	23 February 2025	State Farm Stadium, Glendale, United States	Colombia	4–1	4–1	2025 SheBelieves Cup
40	27 June 2025	Butarque, Leganés, Spain	Spain	1–0	1–3	Friendly
41	29 November 2025	Peace Stadium, Nagasaki, Japan	Canada	2–0	3–0	Friendly
42	2 December 2025	Transcosmos Stadium Nagasaki, Isahaya, Japan	Canada	1–0	1–0	Friendly
43	15 March 2026	Stadium Australia, Sydney, Australia	Philippines	1–0	7–0	2026 AFC Women's Asian Cup

== Honours ==
Nippon TV Beleza

- Nadeshiko League: 2015, 2016, 2017, 2018, 2019
- Empress's Cup: 2014, 2017, 2018
- Nadeshiko League Cup: 2012, 2016, 2018
- AFC Women's Club Championship: 2019

INAC Kobe Leonessa

- WE League: 2021-22
- Empress's Cup: 2023

Japan

- SheBelieves Cup: 2025

Individual

- Nadeshiko League Top Scorer: 2016, 2017, 2018, 2019
- Nadeshiko League Best XI: 2015, 2016, 2017, 2018, 2019
- Nadeshiko League Best Player Award (MVP): 2018, 2019
- NWSL Best XI Second Team: 2026
