= Shaelan Murison =

American soccer player (born 1998)

Personal information
- Full name: Shaelan Grace Murison Brown
- Date of birth: March 5, 1998 (age 28)
- Place of birth: San Jose, California, U.S.
- Height: 5 ft 10 in (1.78 m)
- Position: Forward

Team information
- Current team: Oakland Soul
- Number: 35

Youth career
- MVLA SC

College career
Years	Team	Apps	(Gls)
2016–2019	UC Santa Barbara Gauchos	75	(34)

Senior career*
Years	Team	Apps	(Gls)
2021	Þróttur Reykjavík	8	(3)
2024	Oakland Soul	11	(8)
2024	Utah Royals	3	(0)
2025–	Oakland Soul	11	(11)
- * Club domestic league appearances and goals as of December 31, 2025

Shaelan Murison (born March 5, 1998) is an American soccer player who plays as a forward for USL W League club Oakland Soul SC. Murison played college soccer for the UC Santa Barbara Gauchos, where she was named the 2019 Big West Conference Offensive Player of the Year. She has previously played professionally for Icelandic club Þróttur Reykjavík and the Utah Royals of the National Women's Soccer League (NWSL).

== Early life ==
Born in San Jose, California, Murison grew up in the nearby city of Santa Clara. She attended Santa Clara High School, where she was twice named all-league first team and league MVP. She also played three seasons of high school volleyball, earning two team MVP awards. Murison played club soccer for MVLA SC, contributing to 2012 Far West Championship and 2014 Surf Cup Championship titles. In August 2011, she received an invitation to an identification camp for the United States under-14 national team in Portland, Oregon.

== College career ==
Murison played four years collegiately with the UC Santa Barbara Gauchos, accumulating 34 goals and 16 assists in 75 appearances. As a freshman in 2016, she was named to the Big West All-Freshman team despite mostly playing as a substitute. Two years later, Murison had a breakout junior season, earning first-team All-Big West and second-team All-West Region honors after leading the Gauchos in goals and ranking third in assists.

She continued her momentum into her senior year, where she scored 17 goals and recorded 7 assists in 19 games. Her goal total was the highest for a UC Santa Barbara player since 2002. Murison's performances earned her the title of Big West Offensive Player of the Year, her second consecutive first-team All-Big West award, and a spot on the all-region first team. She departed from the program with four Big West Offensive Player of the Week accolades, as well as a career goal total that ranked within the top eight in program history.

== Club career ==
=== Þróttur Reykjavík ===
After graduating from college, Murison trained with the Utah Royals of the National Women's Soccer League as a preseason trialist. Although she did not end up signing for the Royals ahead of the team's final season of its first iteration as a club, Murison would eventually return to Utah four years later and make the squad.

Instead, she signed her first professional contract with Icelandic club Þróttur Reykjavík in January 2021. In her sole season with Þróttur, Murison made 8 Besta deild kvenna league appearances and scored 3 goals. She also scored 5 goals in 4 Icelandic Women's Football Cup appearances, including one in the club's semifinal victory over Selfoss. Þróttur were ultimately beaten by Breiðablik, 4–0, in the cup final.

=== Oakland Soul ===
Murison eventually moved back to the San Francisco Bay Area. She was a non-rostered invitee with NWSL expansion club Bay FC in the 2024 preseason, but did not make the team's inaugural roster.

Later in the year, she ended up joining pre-professional team Oakland Soul SC for the 2024 USL W League season. On May 15, 2024, she helped the Soul win its home-opening match against Olympic Club, scoring twice in the 7–1 victory. The following match, Murison registered a first-half hat trick to secure a berth in the W League playoffs for Oakland. Her performances throughout June 2024 earned her a spot on the league's Team of the Month.

=== Utah Royals ===
On July 17, 2024, the Utah Royals, midway through its return season to the NWSL, announced the signing of Murison to a national team replacement player contract ahead of the 2024 NWSL x Liga MX Femenil Summer Cup. Three days later, Murison made her club debut, coming on as a late-game substitute for Paige Monaghan in a 2–1 win over the Seattle Reign. In Utah's final Summer Cup match, a win over Club Tijuana, Murison marked her second-ever Royals appearance with an assist to Brecken Mozingo. Murison's contract expired shortly afterward, but she was brought in again in September 2024, this time signing a national team replacement player to fill in for 2024 FIFA U-20 Women's World Cup participant Ally Sentnor. She made her NWSL debut on September 14, 2024, in a home loss to the San Diego Wave. She made two more appearances, both as substitutes, before departing from Utah.

=== Return to Oakland Soul ===
Murison returned to Oakland Soul SC in 2025. She scored 11 goals in 11 league games in her first season back, soon becoming the club's all-time leading goalscorer. The following year, she joined the Soul for a third season, starting off the campaign by tallying a brace in Oakland's opening-day victory over Marin FC.

== Honors and awards ==
Individual

- First-team All-Big West: 2018, 2019
- Big West all-freshman team: 2016
