= Cameron Tucker (soccer) =

American soccer player (born 1999)

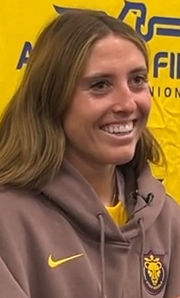
- Tucker with the Utah Royals in 2024

Personal information
- Full name: Cameron Elaine Tucker
- Date of birth: July 15, 1999 (age 27)
- Height: 5 ft 9 in (1.75 m)
- Position: Forward

Youth career
- 2013–2016: Lone Peak Knights

College career
| Years | Team | Apps | (Gls) |
| 2017–2021 | BYU Cougars | 99 | (43) |

Senior career*
| Years | Team | Apps | (Gls) |
| 2022 | NJ/NY Gotham FC | 13 | (0) |
| 2023 | Houston Dash | 12 | (0) |
| 2024 | Utah Royals | 9 | (1) |
| 2025 | Levante UD | 1 | (0) |
| 2025–2026 | Spokane Zephyr | 19 | (1) |
- * Club domestic league appearances and goals as of 23:02, May 18, 2026 (UTC)

Cameron Elaine Tucker (born July 15, 1999) is an American professional soccer who most recently played as a forward for USL Super League club Spokane Zephyr FC. She played college soccer for the BYU Cougars. She previously played in the National Women's Soccer League (NWSL) for NJ/NY Gotham FC, the Houston Dash, and the Utah Royals.

== Early life ==
Tucker is a native of Highland, Utah, and was born to Bruce and Jennifer Tucker. She attended Lone Peak High School.

=== BYU Cougars ===
Tucker attended BYU and was a forward on the BYU Cougars women's soccer team. She totaled 43 goals and 31 assists during her collegiate career and was a critical part of the BYU offense en route to their first College Cup appearance in 2021.

In 2021, she had her most productive season for BYU tallying 16 goals and 10 assists earning an NCAA All-American honors as well as multiple conference and team honors. Her highlight of the season was her game-winning goal against the first-ranked University of Virginia in the 2021 NCAA tournament, securing the Cougars a place in the Elite Eight.

== Club career ==
=== NY/NJ Gotham FC ===
Tucker joined NJ/NY Gotham FC as an undrafted free agent on December 15, 2021. She signed a two-year contract with an option for a third year.

Tucker made her first professional appearance on March 19, 2022, starting in a 2-0 defeat to the North Carolina Courage in the NWSL Challenge Cup. Her first NWSL regular season appearance came on May 1, 2022, in a 3-0 victory over the Orlando Pride. Tucker entered the match as a second-half substitute for Nahomi Kawasumi. She appeared in 13 games in 2022.

On January 18, 2023, Gotham FC announced that the club had waived Tucker.

=== Houston Dash ===
On January 30, 2023, the Houston Dash claimed Tucker off of waivers and signed her to their 2023 Preseason Roster. Tucker made her first appearance for the club on March 26, 2023, playing 29 minutes in a 0-0 draw against Racing Louisville FC. Tucker finished the 2023 NWSL season with 12 matches and 244 minutes played. The Dash subsequently decided to exercise Tucker's contract option, keeping her on the roster for the 2024 season.

=== Utah Royals ===
On December 12, 2023, the Dash traded Tucker and $50,000 of NWSL allocation money to the Utah Royals in exchange for protection in the 2024 NWSL expansion draft. Tucker made her first appearance for the Royals in the team's March 16, 2024 home-opener against the Chicago Red Stars. She came on in the 70th minute to replace Agnes Nyberg in a 0-2 defeat. On May 12, 2024, Tucker scored a long-range goal in a 1-3 road loss to the Red Stars. It was her first competitive NWSL goal. At the end of the 2024 season, the Royals announced that Tucker would not be returning to the club.

=== Levante UD ===
Tucker joined Liga F club Levante UD on January 31, 2025. She signed a contract for the Spanish team lasting until the end of the season.

=== Spokane Zephyr ===
On July 1, 2025, Tucker joined the Spokane Zephyr in the USL Super League. She made her Zephyr debut on August 23, playing the entirety of Spokane's season-opening loss to Dallas Trinity FC. The club folded after the season in May 2026.

== Personal life ==
Tucker is a member of the Church of Jesus Christ of Latter-day Saints (LDS Church).

== Career statistics ==
=== Club ===
As of match played June 8, 2024

| Club | Season | League | | | Cup (Note: NWSL Challenge Cup) | | Playoffs (Note: Includes NWSL Playoffs) | | Total | |
| Club | Season | Division | Apps | Goals | Apps | Goals | Apps | Goals | Apps | Goals |
|---|---|---|---|---|---|---|---|---|---|---|
| NJ/NY Gotham FC | 2022 | NWSL | 13 | 0 | 5 | 0 | — | | 18 | 0 |
| Houston Dash | 2023 | NWSL | 12 | 0 | 5 | 0 | — | | 17 | 0 |
| Utah Royals | 2024 | NWSL | 9 | 1 | — | | — | | 9 | 1 |
| Career total | | | 34 | 1 | 10 | 0 | 0 | 0 | 44 | 1 |
