= Darielle O'Brien =

American soccer player

Personal information
- Full name: Darielle Victoria O'Brien
- Height: 5 ft 6 in (1.68 m)
- Position: Defender

College career
Years	Team	Apps	(Gls)
2015–2018	UC Riverside Highlanders	71	(6)

Senior career*
Years	Team	Apps	(Gls)
2019–2024	United City FC	–	(19)
2024	Utah Royals	0	(0)
- * Club domestic league appearances and goals as of July 9, 2025

Darielle Victoria O'Brien is an American professional soccer player who most recently played as a defender for the Utah Royals of the National Women's Soccer League (NWSL). She played college soccer for the UC Riverside Highlanders.

== Early life ==
O'Brien is a native of Fontana, California. She attended Summit High School, where she won 4 varsity letters, was a 2-time offensive MVP, and received one all-league first team honor. O'Brien was a productive goalscorer for Summit, particularly in her final high school season; she scored 19 goals in the first 8 games of her senior year and was one of the California Interscholastic Federation's top scorers.

== College career ==
O'Brien played for the UC Riverside Highlanders on a soccer scholarship from 2015 to 2018. On October 23, 2015, she scored her first two college goals in a defeat at the hands of Santa Barbara. She registered 16 matches in her freshman year, a number she would bring up to 18 the following season. As a junior, she led the team in assists and tied for third place in goals scored. One of O'Brien's assists came in an August 25 match against Denver, in which she also scored the 87th minute game-tying goal to salvage a 2–2 draw. O'Brien capped off her college career with a senior season in which she tallied 2 assists and was named as an All-Big West honorable mention.

== Club career ==
=== United City FC ===
After leaving college, O'Brien spent 5 years with United City FC, a United Premier Soccer League team in Downey, California. She helped United City earn several UPSL, Southwest Premier League, and Alianza de Futbol titles. O'Brien was an offensive threat in her time with United City, recording a sum of 19 goals and 32 assists.

=== Utah Royals ===
On July 17, 2024, O'Brien signed her first professional deal with the NWSL's Utah Royals. She inked a national team replacement player contract, helping fill in for Utah's 4 players participating in the 2024 Olympics. She made her professional debut two days later, coming on as a second-half substitute for Madison Pogarch in an NWSL x Liga MX Femenil Summer Cup match against the Seattle Reign. On August 28, the Royals re-signed O'Brien, this time as an injury replacement player. At the end of the season, O'Brien departed from Utah and entered NWSL free agency.

== Career statistics ==
=== Club ===
As of July 9, 2025

Appearances and goals by club, season and competition
Club	Season	League			Cup		Playoffs		Other		Total	
Club	Season	Division	Apps	Goals	Apps	Goals	Apps	Goals	Apps	Goals	Apps	Goals
Utah Royals	2024	NWSL	0	0	—		—		1 (Note: Includes the NWSL x Liga MX Femenil Summer Cup)	0	1	0
Career total			0	0	0	0	0	0	1	0	1	0
