= Ana Tejada =

Spanish footballer (born 2002)

- Tejada with the Utah Royals in 2026

Personal information
- Full name: Ana Tejada Jiménez
- Date of birth: 2 June 2002 (age 24)
- Place of birth: Logroño, Spain
- Height: 1.70 m (5 ft 7 in)
- Positions: Centre back; defensive midfielder

Team information
- Current team: Utah Royals
- Number: 17

Youth career
- 2015–2017: Logroño

Senior career*
Years	Team	Apps	(Gls)
2017–2019	Logroño	24+	(1+)
2019–2024	Real Sociedad	86	(1)
2024–	Utah Royals	64	(2)

International career^{‡}
2018–2019	Spain U17	18	(0)
2019	Spain U19	2	(0)
2021–2023	Spain U23	7	(0)
2022	Spain U20	6	(0)
2022–	Spain	1	(0)
Medal record
Women's football
Representing Spain
UEFA Women's Under-17 Championship
First place	2018 Lithuania
FIFA U-17 Women's World Cup
First place	2018 Uruguay
FIFA U-20 Women's World Cup
First place	2022 Costa Rica
- * Club domestic league appearances and goals as of 04:27, 10 November 2026 (UTC) ‡ National team caps and goals as of 02:34, 23 December 2023 (UTC)

Ana Tejada Jiménez (born 2 June 2002) is a Spanish professional footballer who plays as a centre back or defensive midfielder for the Utah Royals of the National Women's Soccer League (NWSL) and the Spain national team.

== Club career ==
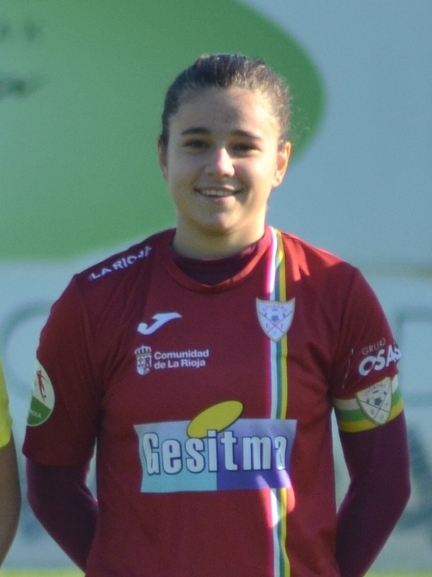
Tejada as Logroño captain in 2019

=== Longroño ===
Raised in the village of Lumbreras in La Rioja, Tejada started her career at Logroño, where she was already playing for the first team when they achieved promotion to the Primera División in 2018, making her the youngest active player in the top league, aged barely 16.

=== Real Sociedad ===
A solid campaign with Logroño led to her being signed by Real Sociedad in 2019. With her first campaign in San Sebastián interrupted by injury and then the COVID-19 pandemic in Spain, she became a regular for the txuri-urdin in the 2020–21 season, starting 24 matches.

=== Utah Royals ===
On 22 April 2024, the Utah Royals announced that they had signed Tejada to a three-year contract. She made her NWSL debut on 25 May, starting in a 1–0 loss to the Kansas City Current. Tejada scored her first goal with the Royals on 31 August as the team beat the Houston Dash, 3–1. Three games later, she was awarded the NWSL Goal of the Week award following a long-distance strike against Racing Louisville FC. She made 15 total appearances with Utah in 2024 as the team finished 11th in the league standings.

== International career ==
Tejada was a member of the Spain under-17 squad that qualified for the UEFA Women's Under-17 Championship in May 2018 (Lithuania) and the FIFA U-17 Women's World Cup played six months later (Uruguay), winning both competitions. She was still young enough to play in the 2019 Under-17 Euros (Bulgaria) and was named in the 'Team of the Tournament', as she had been in the previous year. She later won the 2022 FIFA U-20 Women's World Cup.

Tejada made her senior debut on 11 November 2022, as a 76th-minute substitute in a 7–0 friendly home win over Argentina.

== Honours ==
Spain U17

- FIFA U-17 Women's World Cup: 2018
- UEFA Women's Under-17 Championship: 2018

Spain U20

- FIFA U-20 Women's World Cup: 2022

Individual

- UEFA Women's Under-17 Championship Team of the Tournament: 2018, 2019
