= Emily Gray =

American soccer player (born 2000)

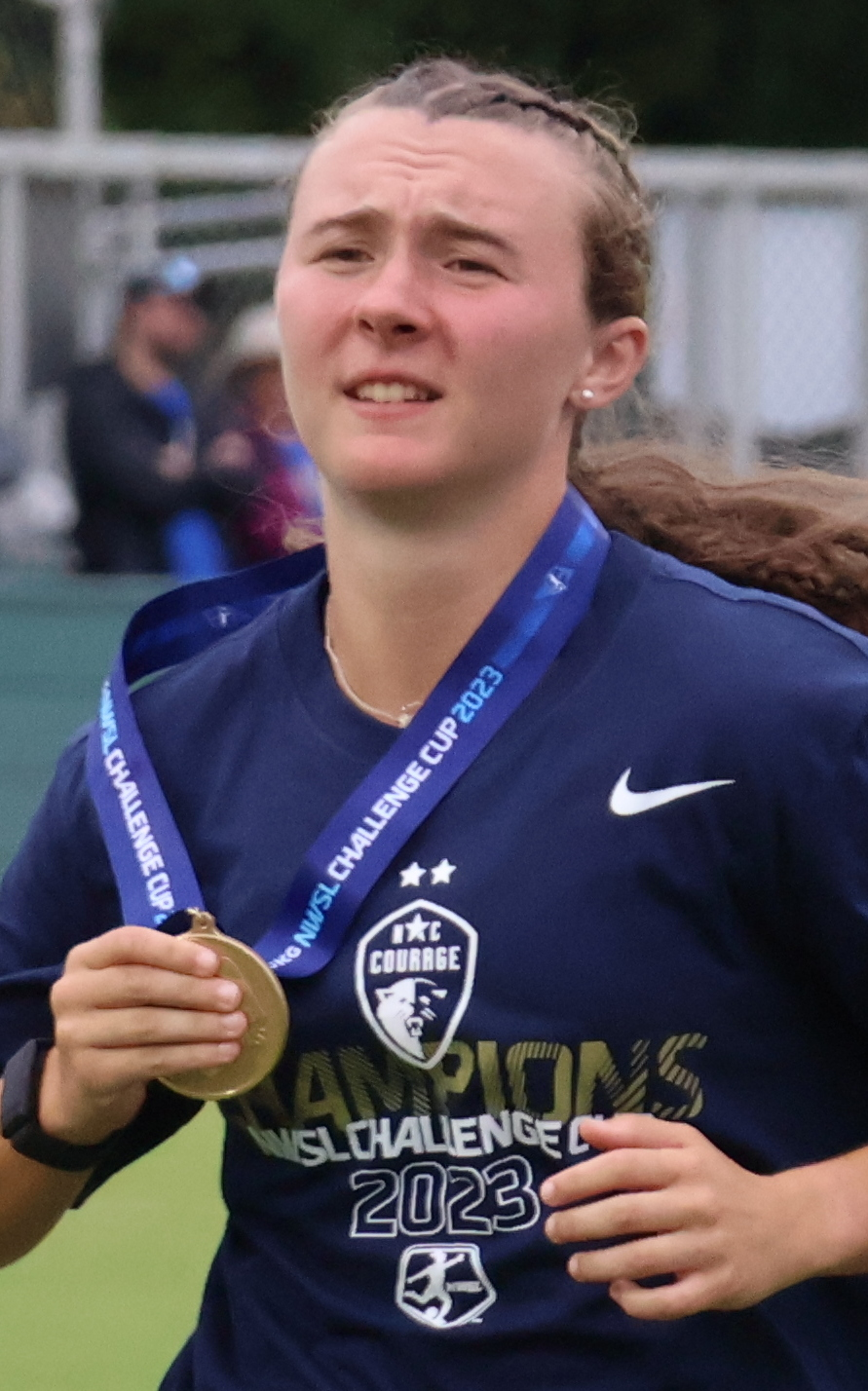
- Gray with the North Carolina Courage in 2023

Personal information
- Full name: Emily Rose Gray
- Date of birth: October 5, 2000 (age 26)
- Place of birth: Sewell, New Jersey, United States
- Height: 5 ft 4 in (1.63 m)
- Position: Midfielder

Team information
- Current team: Glasgow City
- Number: 23

Youth career
- Penn Fusion

College career
Years	Team	Apps	(Gls)
2018–2021	Virginia Tech Hokies	69	(27)

Senior career*
Years	Team	Apps	(Gls)
2022–2023	North Carolina Courage	3	(0)
2024–2026	Utah Royals	2	(0)
2024	→ Odense Boldklub Q (loan)	14	(3)
2025	→ Piteå IF (loan)	0	(0)
2026–	Glasgow City	0	(0)

International career
2018–2019	United States U20	3	(0)
- * Club domestic league appearances and goals as of March 7, 2025

Emily Rose Gray (born October 5, 2000) is an American professional soccer player who plays as a midfielder for Glasgow City of the Scottish Women's Premier League.

== Early life ==
Gray was raised in the Sewell section of Washington Township, Gloucester County, New Jersey, where she attended Washington Township High School.

=== College career ===
Gray attended Virginia Tech where she played for the Hokies from 2018 to 2021.

== Club career ==
=== North Carolina Courage, 2022–2023 ===
Gray was selected by the North Carolina Courage as the number three overall pick at the 2022 NWSL Draft. She made her debut for North Carolina on April 29, 2022, earning an assist.

=== Utah Royals, 2024–2026 ===
She was traded to Utah Royals in November 2023.

==== Odense Boldklub Q (loan), 2024 ====
On July 19, 2024, Utah Royals announced that Gray had been loaned to Odense Boldklub Q of the Danish Kvindeliga for the remainder of the 2024 NWSL season.

==== Piteå IF (loan), 2025 ====
Upon returning to Utah following her loan to Odense Boldklub Q, Gray was once again loaned out for a season, this time to Piteå IF of the Damallsvenskan.

=== Glasgow City, 2026– ===
On January 31, 2026, Gray joined for Scottish Women's Premier League team Glasgow City on a deal running until summer 2027.
