= Kate Del Fava =

American soccer player (born 1998)

- Del Fava with the Utah Royals in 2026

Personal information
- Full name: Kathryn Jean Del Fava
- Date of birth: July 23, 1998 (age 28)
- Place of birth: Kenosha, Wisconsin, United States
- Height: 5 ft 9 in (1.75 m)
- Position: Defender

Team information
- Current team: Utah Royals
- Number: 8

Youth career
- –2016: FC Wisconsin Eclipse

College career
Years	Team	Apps	(Gls)
2016–2019	Illinois State Redbirds	84	(25)

Senior career*
Years	Team	Apps	(Gls)
2020	Utah Royals	0	(0)
2021–2023	Kansas City Current	53	(0)
2024–	Utah Royals	82	(4)

International career^{‡}
2026–	United States	1	(0)
- * Club domestic league appearances and goals as of 04:20, November 10, 2026 (UTC) ‡ National team caps and goals as of October 13, 2026

Kathryn Jean Del Fava (born July 23, 1998) is an American professional soccer player who plays as a defender for the Utah Royals of the National Women's Soccer League (NWSL).

== Club career ==
=== Utah Royals ===
Del Fava made her professional debut in the 2020 NWSL Challenge Cup on June 30, 2020.

=== Kansas City Current ===
On October 16, 2022, Del Fava scored the winning goal in the 10th minute of overtime in a playoff match against the Houston Dash. It was the latest goal in NWSL history and the first goal of Del Fava's NWSL career.

=== Utah Royals ===
On December 12, 2023, Utah Royals finalized a trade with the Kansas City Current that sent Del Fava and the 4th overall pick in the 2024 NWSL College Draft to Utah in exchange for expansion draft protection and $75,000 in allocation money for the Current.

In the away game against Bay FC, Del Fava scored in the 89th minute to make it 1–0. She played every minute of the 2024 season for the Royals, becoming an iron woman for the first time.

== International career ==
Del Fava was called up to the United States under-23 national team in September 2026 as an overage player. Following an injury to Naomi Girma, Del Fava received her first senior national team call-up on October 4 and was elevated to the senior team in Girma's stead. She made her first appearance for the senior team, coming on as a substitute in a friendly against Spain, on October 13, 2026.

== Personal life ==
Del Fava is a native of Kenosha, Wisconsin, and attended St. Joseph Catholic Academy.

== Career statistics ==
=== International ===
As of match played October 13, 2026

National Team	Year	Apps	Goals
United States	2026	1	0
Total		1	0

== Honors ==
Individual

- NWSL Best XI First Team: 2026
