= Agnes Nyberg =

Swedish footballer (born 2000)

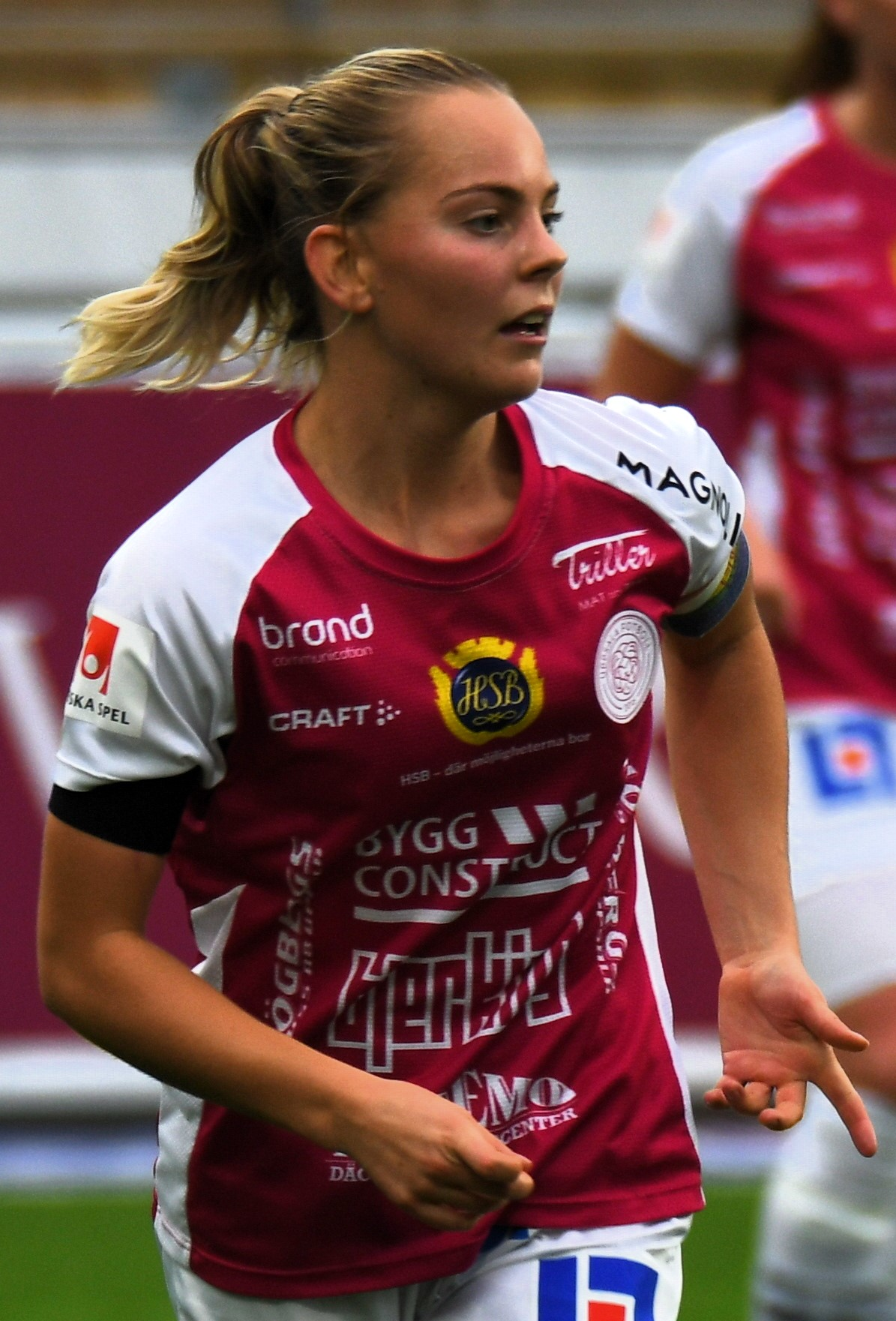
- Nyberg with Uppsala in 2020

Personal information
- Full name: Agnes Birgitta Nyberg
- Date of birth: 19 April 2000 (age 26)
- Place of birth: Uppsala, Sweden
- Height: 1.63 m (5 ft 4 in)
- Position: Midfielder

Team information
- Current team: Rosenborg
- Number: 8

Youth career
- 2007–2014: Vaksala SK

Senior career*
| Years | Team | Apps | (Gls) |
| 2015–2021 | IK Sirius / IK Uppsala | 135 | (7) |
| 2022 | AIK | 20 | (0) |
| 2023 | IK Uppsala | 25 | (1) |
| 2024 | Utah Royals | 11 | (0) |
| 2025– | Rosenborg | 1 | (0) |

International career^{‡}
| 2015–2017 | Sweden U-19 | 16 | (1) |
| 2017–2019 | Sweden U-19 | 16 | (1) |
| 2022–2023 | Sweden U-23 | 7 | (1) |
- * Club domestic league appearances and goals as of 1 November 2024 ‡ National team caps and goals as of 16 July 2023

Agnes Birgitta Nyberg (born 19 April 2000) is a Swedish professional footballer who plays as a midfielder for Toppserien club Rosenborg.

Nyberg joined IK Uppsala (originally called IK Sirius) at age 14 and captained the club to top-flight promotion in her fourth full season in 2019. She has also played for Swedish club AIK and the Utah Royals in the United States. She represented Sweden at the youth international level.

== Club career ==
=== IK Sirius / IK Uppsala ===
Nyberg was born in Uppsala and raised in the neighborhood of Fålhagen. She began playing football with Vaksala SK at the age of seven. In December 2014, at age 14, she signed with Elitettan club IK Sirius. On 19 August 2015, she made her debut in a 2–0 win against Tierps IF in the second round of the Swedish Cup, substituting for Tempest-Marie Norlin in the 65th minute. The following year, she featured regularly in her first first Elitettan season with 3 goals in 21 appearances (11 starts) as Sirius finished in sixth place of 14 teams; her first goal came in a 1–0 win against Östersunds DFF on 14 May 2016.

IK Uppsala was established out of the women's side of IK Sirius at the start of 2017. Nyberg made 47 appearances (38 starts) over the next two years as Uppsala finished eighth in the Elitettan twice in a row. At age 18, she became Uppsala's youngest-ever captain at the start of 2019. She made 22 appearances (20 starts) as she led Uppsala to place second in the league that year, earning promotion to the Damallsvenskan. They clinched promotion on the final matchday with a 3–1 comeback win over third-place finishers Hammarby on 27 October 2019.

Nyberg made her top-flight debut on 27 June 2020, replacing Ida Strömblad in the 79th minute down 1–2 to Djurgården; she helped Uppsala come back to finish the match 3–2 on Beata Olsson's winning goal. She signed a new two-year contract in October. She made 20 appearances (12 starts) as Uppsala came last in the season and were relegated after their first Damallsvenskan campaign. In the 2021 season, Nyberg scored 2 goals in 25 appearances (23 starts) as Uppsala placed fourth in the Elitettan, just outside of the promotion zone.

=== AIK ===
On 22 December 2021, Nyberg signed with Damallsvenskan club AIK on a two-year contract. She debuted for the club on 27 March 2022, in a 2–0 win against KIF Örebro. She made 20 appearances (all starts) but left the club at the end of the season after they came last and were relegated.

=== Return to IK Uppsala ===
On 3 January 2023, Nyberg returned to Uppsala as the club returned to the top division. She captained the club in a difficult season in which they were left without a manager for a period. She scored her first Damallsvenskan goal on 19 June 2023 in a 5–2 defeat to Rosengård. She made 25 appearances (all starts) but saw Uppsala relegated by one point as they placed 13th of 14 teams.

=== Utah Royals ===
On 2 January 2024, Nyberg signed as a free agent with National Women's Soccer League (NWSL) expansion side Utah Royals, who were restarting operations after four years. She made her NWSL debut on the opening matchday on 16 March 2024, a 2–0 loss to the Chicago Red Stars. She went on to make 11 appearances (8 starts) before being impeded by injuries.

=== Rosenborg ===
Norwegian club Rosenborg announced Nyberg's signing in February 2025.

== International career ==
Nyberg received her first call-up to the Sweden youth national team at the U15 level in July 2015. She debuted for the U15 team on 22 September 2015, captaining Sweden in a 2–2 draw against Norway. She scored her first goal for the U17 team on 6 October 2016 in a 3–0 win against Malta in the 2017 UEFA Women's Under-17 Championship qualification. She played a total of 16 international matches and scored one goal for the U17 national team. She also played 16 matches and scored one goal for the U19 team. She debuted for the U23 team in a 3–2 win against Portugal on 12 April 2022. She made 7 appearances for the U23 team and scored her only goal at the level in a 5–0 win against Portugal on 10 April 2023.
