= Paige Cronin =

American soccer player (born 1996)

- Cronin with the Utah Royals in 2026

Personal information
- Birth name: Paige Quinn Monaghan
- Date of birth: November 13, 1996 (age 30)
- Place of birth: Succasunna, New Jersey, U.S.
- Height: 5 ft 7 in (1.70 m)
- Positions: Forward; right back

Team information
- Current team: Utah Royals
- Number: 4

Youth career
- 2011–2014: Roxbury High School
- Players Development Academy

College career
Years	Team	Apps	(Gls)
2015–2018	Butler Bulldogs	80	(22)

Senior career*
Years	Team	Apps	(Gls)
2019–2022	NJ/NY Gotham FC	57	(6)
2023	Racing Louisville	22	(3)
2024–	Utah Royals	59	(9)

International career^{‡}
2018–2019	United States U-23		
- * Club domestic league appearances and goals as of 04:19, November 10, 2026 (UTC) ‡ National team caps and goals as of April 20, 2019

Paige Quinn Cronin (née Monaghan; born November 13, 1996) is an American professional soccer player who plays as a forward or right back for and captains the Utah Royals of the National Women's Soccer League (NWSL). She played college soccer for the Butler Bulldogs and was drafted 10th overall by Sky Blue FC in the 2019 NWSL College Draft.

== Early life and college career ==
Cronin grew up in the Succasunna section of Roxbury, New Jersey, alongside her mother Christine, dad Jim, two brothers and one sister. She attended Roxbury High School, where she played soccer for four years, scoring 68 goals in 45 appearances and earning the NJ.com's 2014 NJAC girls soccer Player of the Year award. She also played two years of high school basketball. She hopes to one day become a sports broadcaster.

=== Butler Bulldogs ===
Cronin played four years for the Butler University Bulldogs, finishing her university career with 22 goals and 18 assists in 80 games played. During her career at Butler she was twice named to the All-Big East First Team (2017, 2018) as well as being awarded the 2017 All-Big East Offensive Player of the Year. Cronin graduated from Butler with a degree in marketing.

== Professional career ==
Paige Cronin with the Utah Royals in 2026

=== Sky Blue FC/NJ/NY Gotham FC ===
Cronin was selected by Sky Blue FC with the 10th overall pick of the 2019 NWSL College Draft. In doing so she became the first player from Butler University to be drafted in the NWSL. She signed with the club in February, 2019. Cronin made her club regular season debut on April 13, 2019.

=== Racing Louisville FC ===
In 2023, Racing Louisville traded its first-round NWSL Draft pick to obtain the playing rights to Cronin, $150,000 in NWSL Allocation Money, and a 2023 international slot.

=== Utah Royals ===
In December 2023, she was selected by Utah Royals in the 2024 NWSL Expansion Draft. She was chosen as the team captain in the 2024 season.

== International career ==
Cronin was a United States youth international at the U23 level.

Cronin received her first call-up to the United States women's national soccer team in December 2019.

== Personal life ==
In December 2025, she married Major League Baseball player Declan Cronin. She began using her married name, Paige Cronin, professionally in 2026.

== Career statistics ==
As of July 23, 2026

League	Club	Season	League			Playoffs		Total	
League	Club	Season	Apps	Assists	Goals	Apps	Goals	Apps	Goals
NCAA	Butler University	2015	19	3	4	4	0	23	4
NCAA	Butler University	2016	18	3	6	0	0	18	6
NCAA	Butler University	2017	18	6	10	3	0	21	10
NCAA	Butler University	2018	18	6	2	0	0	18	2
NCAA	Butler University	total	73	18	22	7	0	80	22
NWSL	Sky Blue FC	2019	23	1	2			23	2
NWSL	Sky Blue FC	2020^{C}	6	0	1			6	1
NWSL	Sky Blue FC	2020^{F}	4	1	2			4	2
NWSL	Sky Blue FC	2021	12	0	1	1	0	13	1
NWSL	Sky Blue FC	2022	22	0	3			22	3
NWSL	Sky Blue FC	total	67	2	9	1	0	68	9
NWSL	Racing Louisville FC	2023	22	0	3			22	3
NWSL	Racing Louisville FC	total	22	0	3	0	0	22	3
NWSL	Utah Royals	2024	22	1	2			22	2
NWSL	Utah Royals	2025	16	2	5			16	5
NWSL	Utah Royals	2026	7	1	1			7	1
NWSL	Utah Royals	total	45	4	8	0	0	45	8
Career total			207	24	42	8	0	215	42

^{C} – NWSL 2020 Challenge Cup

^{F} – NWSL 2020 Fall Series
