= 2026 Utah Royals season =

Utah Royals 2026 soccer season

Utah Royals
2026 season
- Owners: Miller Sports + Entertainment (Gail Miller) (majority); David Blitzer (minority)
- Sporting Director: Kelly Cousins
- Head coach: Jimmy Coenraets
- Stadium: America First Field; Sandy, Utah; (Capacity: 20,213)
- NWSL: 7th
- Playoffs: Semifinals
- Top goalscorer: Mina Tanaka (9)
- Highest home attendance: 19,274 (vs DEN, May 23)
- Lowest home attendance: 5,572 (vs NC, Sep 27)
- Average home league attendance: 9,143
- Biggest win: 5–1 (vs POR (H), NWSL, Aug 2)
- Biggest defeat: 0–3 (vs LA (H), NWSL, Sep 20)
Home colors	Away colors	Third colors
- All statistics correct as of November 14, 2026.

The 2026 Utah Royals season was the team's sixth season of existence in the National Women's Soccer League (NWSL), the top tier of women's soccer in the United States. It was the club's third season after returning to the league in 2024. The club played its home games at America First Field in Sandy, Utah.

== Background ==
In 2024, the Royals returned to the NWSL following a three-year absence.

== Team ==
=== Current squad ===
As of July 12, 2026

No.	Pos.	Player	Nation
1	GK	USA	Mandy McGlynn
2	DF	USA	Tatumn Milazzo
4	FW	USA	Paige Cronin (Captain)
5	FW	USA	Cece Delzer
6	FW	JAM	Kameron Simmonds
8	DF	USA	Kate Del Fava
9	FW	SLO	Lara Prašnikar
10	MF	JPN	Narumi Miura
11	FW	JPN	Mina Tanaka
12	MF	USA	Alex Loera (SEI)
13	FW	USA	Brecken Mozingo
14	DF	ESP	Nuria Rábano
15	MF	HAI	Dayana Pierre-Louis
16	MF	USA	Courtney Brown
17	MF	ESP	Ana Tejada
18	DF	USA	Kaleigh Riehl
19	FW	USA	KK Ream (SEI)
21	FW	MEX	Kiana Palacios
22	DF	JPN	Miyabi Moriya
23	GK	USA	Mia Justus
24	FW	CAN	Cloé Lacasse
30	FW	USA	Alexa Spaanstra
77	GK	USA	DeAira Jackson
99	MF	USA	Madison Hammond

==== Out on loan ====
No.	Pos.	Nation	Player
20	MF	USA	Aria Nagai (on loan to Dallas Trinity FC)

=== Technical staff ===
As of July 12, 2026

Technical staff
Role	Name
President of Soccer Operation	Jason Kreis
Sporting Director	Kelly Cousins
General Manager	Connor Oniki
Head Coach	Jimmy Coenraets
Assistant Coach	John Griffitts
Assistant Coach	Emily Simpkins
Goalkeeper Coach	James White
Performance Coach/Analyst	Sam Lismont
Analyst	James Chandler
Head Athletic Trainer	Rylie McMurry
Assistant Athletic Trainer	Paula Garcia Barajas
Head of Athletic Performance	Mark Plaisance
Head of Sports Medicine	Elise Vadivaloo
Head Strength & Conditioning Coach	Jessica Mendez

== Competitions ==
=== Regular season ===
==== Regular-season standings ====
Pos	Team	Pld	W	D	L	GF	GA	GD	Pts	Qualification
5	Angel City FC	30	15	7	8	54	32	+22	52	Playoffs
6	Portland Thorns FC	30	14	8	8	50	41	+9	50	Playoffs
7	Utah Royals	30	14	5	11	44	39	+5	47	Playoffs
8	Seattle Reign FC	30	14	5	11	37	33	+4	47	Playoffs
9	North Carolina Courage	30	14	3	13	52	42	+10	45	

Source: NWSL
Rules for classification: 1) points; 2) total goal difference; 3) total wins; 4) total goals scored; 5) head-to-head points; 6) head-to-head goal goals scored; 7) fewest disciplinary points; 8) coin toss (if 2 clubs tied) or drawing of lots (if ≥3 clubs tied).

==== Results summary ====
Overall								Home						Away					
Pld	W	D	L	GF	GA	GD	Pts	W	D	L	GF	GA	GD	W	D	L	GF	GA	GD
30	14	5	11	44	39	+5	47	8	1	6	21	19	+2	6	4	5	23	20	+3

Last updated: November 1, 2026.
Source: NWSLsoccer.com

==== Results by matchday ====
Matchday	1	2	3	4	5	6	7	8	9	10	11	12	13	14	15	16	17	18	19	20	21	22	23	24	25	26	27	28	29	30
Ground	A	H	A	A	H	A	A	H	A	H	H	A	A	H	H	A	H	H	A	H	A	A	H	A	H	H	A	H	H	A
Result	L	L	D	W	W	W	W	W	D	W	W	D	L	L	W	W	L	W	L	W	L	W	L	W	L	W	D	L	D	L
Position	11	15	15	10	7	5	4	2	4	2	1	2	4	5	5	3	3	3	3	3	4	3	4	3	4	4	4	6	6	7

Updated to match(es) played on November 1, 2026. Source: NWSLsoccer.com
A = Away; H = Home; W = Win; D = Draw; L = Loss; P = Postponed; = NWSL Shield; = NWSL Playoffs

==== Matches ====
March 14 1	Kansas City Current	2–1	Utah Royals	Kansas City, Missouri
3:00 p.m. CDT	Scott (yellow card) 51'; Bethune 57'; Sentnor 69'	Report	Milazzo 35'	Stadium: CPKC Stadium; Attendance: 11,500; Referee: Natalie Simon

March 22 2	Utah Royals	1–2	San Diego Wave FC	Sandy, Utah
5:00 pm MDT (UTC-6)	Nagai (yellow card) 12'; Prašnikar (yellow card) 17' (goal) 67'; Milazzo (yellow card) 72' (yellow-red card) 82'; Spaanstra (yellow card) 73'	Report	Dudinha 18'; Morroni (yellow card) 55'; Godfrey 87'	Stadium: America First Field; Attendance: 9,778; Referee: Shawn Tehini

March 25 3	Washington Spirit	1–1	Utah Royals	Washington, D.C.
5:00 pm MDT (UTC-6)	Bernal 18'	Report	Simmonds (yellow card) 21'; Tanaka 84'	Stadium: Audi Field; Attendance: 9,349; Referee: J.C. Griggs

March 28 4	Boston Legacy FC	1–2	Utah Royals	Foxborough, Massachusetts
10:00 am MDT (UTC-6)	Traoré (yellow card) 17', (goal) 72'; Stevens (yellow card) 36'; Karich (yellow card) 45+5'; Caño (yellow card) 68'	Report	Milazzo 33'; Tanaka (yellow card) 45+4'; Lacasse (yellow card) 47'; Prašnikar 50' (pen.); Del Fava (yellow card) 78'; Palacios (yellow card) 90+6'	Stadium: Gillette Stadium; Attendance: 10,012; Referee: Elvis Osmanovic

April 3 5	Utah Royals	1–0	Chicago Stars FC	Sandy, Utah
7:00 pm MDT (UTC-6)	Tanaka 74' (pen.)	Report		Stadium: America First Field; Attendance: 7,244; Referee: Trevor Wiseman

April 26 6	Seattle Reign FC	0–3	Utah Royals	Seattle, Washington
6:00 pm MDT (UTC-6)	Meza (yellow card) 80'	Report	Cronin 1'; Miura 7'; Tejada (yellow card) 13'; Lacasse 45+1'; Thomsen (yellow card) 70'	Stadium: Lumen Field; Attendance: 8,211; Referee: Matt Thompson

May 2 7	Angel City FC	0–1	Utah Royals	Los Angeles, California
6:45 pm MDT (UTC-6)	Niehues (red card) 45+6'; Ary Borges (yellow card) 90+3'; Shores (yellow card) 90+9'	Report	Lacasse 32', (yellow card) 45+6'; Tejada (yellow card) 57'; Pierre-Louis (yellow card) 79'	Stadium: BMO Stadium; Attendance: 15,183; Referee: Lauren Aldrich

May 6 8	Utah Royals	2–0	Houston Dash	Sandy, Utah
8:00 pm MDT (UTC-6)	Lacasse 38'; Tejada (yellow card) 71'; Brown 88'; Pierre-Louis (yellow card) 90+7'	Report	Ekić (yellow card) 28'	Stadium: America First Field; Attendance: 6,789; Referee: Natalie Simon

May 10 9	Bay FC	0–0	Utah Royals	San Jose, California
2:00 pm MDT (UTC-6)	Hutton (yellow card) 55'; Cometti (yellow card) 65'; Anderson (yellow card) 80'	Report	Milazzo (yellow card) 70'	Stadium: PayPal Park; Attendance: 11,689; Referee: Cristian Campo

May 17 10	Utah Royals	2–1	Racing Louisville FC	Sandy, Utah
6:00 pm MDT (UTC-6)	Milliet 22' (o.g.); Tanaka 77'	Report	Flint (yellow card) 45+4'; Fischer 68'	Stadium: America First Field; Attendance: 6,514; Referee: Elton Garcia

May 23 11	Utah Royals	2–1	Denver Summit FC	Sandy, Utah
4:30 pm MDT (UTC-6)	Palacios 20'; Tanaka 72' (pen.)	Report	Ryan 45'; Gaetino (yellow card) 75'	Stadium: America First Field; Attendance: 19,274; Referee: Brad Jensen

May 30 12	Portland Thorns FC	2–2	Utah Royals	Portland, Oregon
2:00 pm MDT (UTC-6)	Moultrie 21'; Bogere (yellow card) 61'; Wilson 90+1' (pen.)	Report	Palacios 44'; Tanaka (yellow card) 48'; Lacasse 50', (yellow card) 90+2'; Tejada (yellow card) 52'; Pierre-Louis (yellow card) 68'	Stadium: Providence Park; Attendance: 20,053; Referee: Sergii Demianchuk

July 5 13	Chicago Stars FC	3–2	Utah Royals	Evanston, Illinois
3:00 pm MDT (UTC-6)	Huitema 20', 86'; Pinto (yellow card) 42'; Staab 59'	Report	Lacasse 43'; Delzer 54' (pen.); Tejada (yellow card) 75'	Stadium: Martin Stadium; Attendance: 4,156; Referee: Laadi Issaka

July 10 14	Utah Royals	1–3	Gotham FC	Sandy, Utah
8:00 pm MDT (UTC-6)	Delzer 23'; Del Fava (yellow card) 45+1'; Lacasse (yellow card) 45+7'; Pierre-Louis (yellow card) 75'	Report	González 26' (pen.), 70'; Howell (yellow card) 32'; Purce (yellow card) 63'; Davidson 45+5'	Stadium: America First Field; Attendance: 10,014; Referee: Alex Billeter

July 18 15	Utah Royals	1–0	Orlando Pride	Sandy, Utah
6:45 pm MDT (UTC-6)	Tejada (yellow card) 32'; Miura 36'; Simmonds (yellow card) 68'	Report		Stadium: America First Field; Attendance: 9,591; Referee: Servando Berna

July 25 16	North Carolina Courage	1–4	Utah Royals	Cary, North Carolina
5:45 pm MDT (UTC-6)	Ijeh 55'	Report	Del Fava 6'; Miura (yellow card) 20'; Milazzo 34'; Tanaka 65'; Lacasse 90+4' (pen.)	Stadium: WakeMed Soccer Park; Attendance: 7,133; Referee: Marie Durr

July 29 17	Utah Royals	0–1	Washington Spirit	Sandy, Utah
7:00 pm MDT (UTC-6)	Cronin (yellow card) 90+1'	Report	Rodman 28'	Stadium: America First Field; Attendance: 9,538; Referee: Matthew Thompson

August 2 18	Utah Royals	5–1	Portland Thorns FC	Sandy, Utah
5:00 pm MDT (UTC-6)	Delzer 35', 47'; Mozingo 68'; Palacios 79'; Del Fava 89'	Report	Wilson 1'	Stadium: America First Field; Attendance: 6,243; Referee: Matthew Corrigan

August 8 19	Denver Summit FC	2–1	Utah Royals	Centennial, Colorado
8:00 pm MDT (UTC-6)	Ryan 51'; Smith (yellow card) 75'; Sonis 90+4'	Report	Tejada (yellow card) 41'; Milazzo 89'	Stadium: Centennial Stadium; Attendance: 12,380; Referee: Gerald Flores

August 14 20	Utah Royals	3–2	Bay FC	Sandy, Utah
8:00 pm MDT (UTC-6)	Moriya 7'; Miura 22'; Tanaka 79' (pen.)	Report	Lema 6'; Gilchrist 29'; Nighswonger (yellow card) 71'	Stadium: America First Field; Attendance: 7,020; Referee: John Griggs

August 21 21	San Diego Wave FC	4–2	Utah Royals	San Diego, California
8:00 pm MDT (UTC-6)	Byars 4', 63'; Barcenas 40'; Ludmila 70'	Report	Tanaka 29', 47'	Stadium: Snapdragon Stadium; Attendance: 11,210; Referee: Elton García

August 29 22	Orlando Pride	1–2	Utah Royals	Orlando, Florida
5:00 pm MDT (UTC-6)	Ovalle (yellow card) 32'; Angelina (yellow card) 35'; Banda 44'	Report	Del Fava (yellow card) 4'; Milazzo (yellow card) 10'; Lacasse 50'; Cronin 69'; Tejada (yellow card) 81'	Stadium: Inter.co Stadium; Attendance: 7,660; Referee: Matthew Thompson

September 4 23	Utah Royals	1–2	Boston Legacy FC	Sandy, Utah
7:30 pm MDT (UTC-6)	Palacios 17'; Cronin (yellow card) 88'	Report	Traoré 10'; Karich (yellow card) 75'; Gambone 86'	Stadium: America First Field; Attendance: 8,112; Referee: Corbyn May

September 12 24	Houston Dash	0–1	Utah Royals	Houston, Texas
6:45 pm MDT (UTC-6)	Patterson (yellow card) 52'; Colaprico (yellow card) 58'; Nielsen (yellow card) 88'	Report	Tanaka 69'	Stadium: Shell Energy Stadium; Attendance: 6,637; Referee: Servando Berna Rico

September 20 25	Utah Royals	0–3	Angel City FC	Sandy, Utah
5:00 pm MDT (UTC-6)	Cronin (red card) 11'; Tejada (red card) 24'; Milazzo (yellow card) 81'	Report	Sentnor 26' (pen.), (yellow card) 70'; Chilufya (yellow card) 45+1'; Suarez 47'; Jónsdóttir 67'	Stadium: America First Field; Attendance: 6,492; Referee: Matthew Corrigan

September 27 26	Utah Royals	2–1	North Carolina Courage	Sandy, Utah
5:00 pm MDT (UTC-6)	Lacasse 17', (yellow card) 44'; Delzer 65'; Del Fava (yellow card) 45+3'; Miura (yellow card) 68'; Riehl (yellow card) 87'	Report	Sanchez 37' (pen.); Bia (yellow card) 90+1'	Stadium: America First Field; Attendance: 5,572; Referee: Jaclyn Metz

October 3 27	Racing Louisville FC	1–1	Utah Royals	Louisville, Kentucky
2:00 pm MDT (UTC-6)	Hodge (yellow card) 33'; O'Kane 42' (pen.); Weber (yellow card) 45+3'	Report	Hammond (yellow card) 11'; Tanaka (yellow card) 45+5'; Palacios (yellow card) 66'; Mozingo 90+6'	Stadium: Lynn Family Stadium; Attendance: 5,155; Referee: Rodrigo Albuquerque

October 17 28	Utah Royals	0–2	Kansas City Current	Sandy, Utah
4:30 pm MDT (UTC-6)	Miura (yellow card) 43'; Tejada (yellow card) 73'; Brown (yellow card) 82'	Report	Hopkins 21', 90+1'; Sharples (yellow card) 90+8'	Stadium: America First Field; Attendance: 10,809; Referee: Danielle Chesky

October 23 29	Utah Royals	0–0	Seattle Reign FC	Sandy, Utah
7:30 pm MDT (UTC-6)		Report	Fishlock (yellow card) 20'; Bugg (yellow card) 37'	Stadium: America First Field; Attendance: 14,149; Referee: Alexandra Billeter

November 1 30	Gotham FC	2–0	Utah Royals	Harrison, New Jersey
3:00 pm MST (UTC-7)	Reiten 9'; Shaw 80', (yellow card) 90+2'	Report	Joseph (yellow card) 64'	Stadium: Sports Illustrated Stadium; Attendance: 11,209; Referee: Alyssa Pennington

=== Playoffs ===
Quarterfinals
1	Gotham FC	1
8	Seattle Reign FC	0
4	Kansas City Current (a.e.t.)	1
5	Angel City FC	0
2	San Diego Wave FC	0
7	Utah Royals	1
3	Washington Spirit	4
6	Portland Thorns FC	1

Semifinals
1	Gotham FC
4	Kansas City Current
3	Washington Spirit	2
7	Utah Royals	1

Championship
3	Washington Spirit

November 6 Quarterfinals	San Diego Wave FC	0–1	Utah Royals	San Diego, California
7:00 pm PT	Bonansea (yellow card) 90'	Report	Palacios 30' (yellow card) 59'; Riehl (yellow card) 68'; Moriya (yellow card) 90+3'; Tejada (yellow card) 90+5'	Stadium: Snapdragon Stadium; Attendance: 12,638; Referee: Katja Koroleva

November 14 Semifinals	Washington Spirit	2–1	Utah Royals	Washington, District of Columbia
12:00 pm ET	Cantore 8'; Luvanga 56'; Rodman (yellow card) 90+4'	Report	Lacasse 2'; Tanaka (yellow card) 71'	Stadium: Audi Field; Attendance: 19,365; Referee: Calin Radosav

== Squad statistics ==
As of August 14, 2026

=== Appearances and goals ===
Starting appearances are listed first, followed by substitute appearances after the + symbol where applicable.

No.	Pos	Nat	Player	Total		NWSL	
No.	Pos	Nat	Player	Apps	Goals	Apps	Goals
Goalkeepers
1	GK	(United States) USA	Mandy McGlynn	15	0	14+1	0
23	GK	(United States) USA	Mia Justus	6	0	6	0
77	GK	(United States) USA	DeAira Jackson	0	0	0	0
Defenders
2	DF	(United States) USA	Tatumn Milazzo	17	4	9+8	4
6	DF	(Jamaica) JAM	Kameron Simmonds	6	0	3+3	0
8	DF	(United States) USA	Kate Del Fava	20	1	20	1
14	DF	(Spain) ESP	Nuria Rábano	14	0	14	0
17	DF	(Spain) ESP	Ana Tejada	19	0	17+2	0
18	DF	(United States) USA	Kaleigh Riehl	16	0	15+1	0
22	DF	(Japan) JPN	Miyabi Moriya	15	1	8+7	1
Midfielders
10	MF	(Japan) JPN	Narumi Miura	15	3	15	3
12	MF	(United States) USA	Alex Loera	0	0	0	0
15	MF	(Haiti) HAI	Dayana Pierre-Louis	8	0	3+5	0
16	MF	(United States) USA	Courtney Brown	11	1	1+10	1
22	MF	(Denmark) DEN	Janni Thomsen	11	0	9+2	0
99	MF	(United States) USA	Madison Hammond	9	0	2+7	0
Forwards
4	FW	(United States) USA	Paige Cronin	12	1	6+6	1
5	FW	(United States) USA	Cece Delzer	19	4	17+2	4
9	FW	(Slovenia) SLO	Lara Prašnikar	13	2	4+9	2
11	FW	(Japan) JPN	Mina Tanaka	17	6	16+1	6
13	FW	(United States) USA	Brecken Mozingo	10	1	2+8	1
19	FW	(United States) USA	KK Ream	1	0	0+1	0
21	FW	(Mexico) MEX	Kiana Palacios	18	3	16+2	3
24	FW	(Canada) CAN	Cloé Lacasse	20	6	20	6
30	FW	(United States) USA	Alexa Spaanstra	13	0	2+11	0
33	FW	(United States) USA	Kalea Eichenberger	1	0	0+1	0
Players away from the club on loan:
20	MF	(United States) USA	Aria Nagai	5	0	1+4	0

== Transactions ==
=== Transfers in ===
Date	Player	Pos.	Previous club	Fee/notes	Ref.
December 2, 2025	(Japan) Miyabi Moriya	DF	(United States) Angel City FC	Free agent signed to a one-year salary exempt contract	
December 2, 2025	(United States) Madison Hammond	MF	(United States) Angel City	Free agent signed to a two-year contract	
December 31, 2025	(United States) Courtney Brown	MF	(United States) Washington Spirit	Free agent signed to a one-year contract	
January 12, 2026	(Japan) Narumi Miura	MF	(United States) Washington Spirit	Traded	
January 29, 2026	(Haiti) Dayana Pierre-Louis	MF	(France) RC Lens		
February 5, 2026	(Jamaica) Kameron Simmonds	FW	(United States) Richmond Ivy		
February 5, 2026	(Mexico) Kiana Palacios	FW	(Mexico) Club América	Traded for an undisclosed transfer fee	
July 24, 2026	(United States) Alexa Spaanstra	FW	(United States) Portland Thorns FC	Traded for 25k in intraleague funds with up to 7.5k in conditional funds	
