= NWSL Coach of the Year =

Annual award in US women's soccer

2026 winner Jimmy Coenraets

The NWSL Coach of the Year award is presented annually to the best head coach in the National Women's Soccer League (NWSL).

Vlatko Andonovski (2013) won the first Coach of the Year award in the NWSL's inaugural season. The most recent winner is Jimmy Coenraets (2026).

As of 2025, the NWSL's individual end-of-year awards are voted upon in two rounds: in the first round, players (50%), owners/general managers/coaches (25%), and media (25%) vote to determine the nominees; in the second round, players (40%), owners/general managers/coaches (25%), media (25%), and fans (10%) vote among the nominees to determine the winner.

== Winners ==
Season	Coach	Nationality	Club	Ref
2013	Vlatko Andonovski	North Macedonia	FC Kansas City	
2014	Laura Harvey	England	Seattle Reign FC	
2015	Laura Harvey (2)	England	Seattle Reign FC	
2016	Mark Parsons	England	Portland Thorns FC	
2017	Paul Riley	England	North Carolina Courage	
2018	Paul Riley (2)	England	North Carolina Courage	
2019	Vlatko Andonovski (2)	North Macedonia	Reign FC	
2020	2020 regular season cancelled due COVID-19 pandemic			
2021	Laura Harvey (3)	England	OL Reign	
2022	Casey Stoney	England	San Diego Wave FC	
2023	Juan Carlos Amorós	Spain	NJ/NY Gotham FC	
2024	Seb Hines	England	Orlando Pride	
2025	Bev Yanez	United States	Racing Louisville FC	
2026	Jimmy Coenraets	Belgium	Utah Royals	

== See also ==
- List of sports awards honoring women
- NWSL Players' Awards
- NWSL awards
- NWSL records and statistics
- Women's soccer in the United States
