= 2025 Pinatar Cup squads =

List of players competing at the 5th edition of the Pinatar Cup

This article lists the squads for the 2025 Pinatar Cup, the 5th edition of the Pinatar Cup. The tournament will consist of a series of friendly matches to be held in Spain from 19 to 25 February 2025.

The age listed for each player is on 19 February 2025, the first day of the tournament. The numbers of caps and goals listed for each player do not include any matches played after the start of tournament. The club listed is the club for which the player last played a competitive match prior to the tournament. The nationality for each club reflects the national association (not the league) to which the club is affiliated. A flag is included for coaches that are of a different nationality than their own national team.

== Squads ==
=== Canada ===
Coach: (England) Casey Stoney

A 26-player squad was announced on 6 February 2025. On 13 February, Bianca St-Georges withdrew due to injury and was replaced by Carly Wickenheiser.

No.	Pos.	Player	Date of birth (age)	Caps	Goals	Club
1	GK	Kailen Sheridan	16 July 1995 (aged 29)	56	0	(United States Soccer Federation) San Diego Wave
4	DF	Shelina Zadorsky	24 October 1992 (aged 32)	104	6	(The Football Association) West Ham United
7	MF	Julia Grosso	29 August 2000 (aged 24)	68	3	(United States Soccer Federation) Chicago Red Stars
8	DF	Jayde Riviere	22 January 2001 (aged 24)	47	1	(The Football Association) Manchester United
9	FW	Jordyn Huitema	8 May 2001 (aged 23)	86	21	(United States Soccer Federation) Seattle Reign
10	DF	Ashley Lawrence	11 June 1995 (aged 29)	141	8	(The Football Association) Chelsea
12	DF	Jade Rose	12 February 2003 (aged 22)	26	0	(United States Soccer Federation) Harvard Crimson
13	MF	Simi Awujo	23 September 2003 (aged 21)	22	1	(The Football Association) Manchester United
14	DF	Vanessa Gilles	11 March 1996 (aged 28)	48	7	(French Football Federation) Lyon
15	FW	Nichelle Prince	19 February 1995 (aged 30)	103	16	(United States Soccer Federation) Kansas City Current
16	FW	Janine Beckie	20 August 1994 (aged 30)	112	36	(United States Soccer Federation) Racing Louisville
17	MF	Jessie Fleming	11 March 1998 (aged 26)	139	20	(United States Soccer Federation) Portland Thorns
18	GK	Sabrina D'Angelo	11 May 1993 (aged 31)	18	0	(The Football Association) Aston Villa
19	FW	Adriana Leon	2 October 1992 (aged 32)	121	41	(The Football Association) Aston Villa
21	DF	Gabrielle Carle	12 October 1998 (aged 26)	51	1	(United States Soccer Federation) Washington Spirit
22	GK	Lysianne Proulx	17 April 1999 (aged 25)	2	0	(Italian Football Federation) Juventus
23	FW	Olivia Smith	5 August 2004 (aged 20)	13	3	(The Football Association) Liverpool
24	FW	Evelyne Viens	6 February 1997 (aged 28)	36	6	(Italian Football Federation) Roma
25	MF	Emma Regan	28 January 2000 (aged 25)	4	0	(Canadian Soccer Association) AFC Toronto
26	MF	Marie-Yasmine Alidou	28 April 1995 (aged 29)	5	2	(Portuguese Football Federation) Benfica
27	DF	Megan Reid	8 July 1996 (aged 28)	1	0	(United States Soccer Federation) Angel City
28	MF	Samantha Chang	13 July 2000 (aged 24)	1	0	(Canadian Soccer Association) Vancouver Rise
29	FW	Clarissa Larisey	2 July 1999 (aged 25)	10	1	(The Football Association) Crystal Palace
30	FW	Nyah Rose	4 April 2005 (aged 19)	1	0	(United States Soccer Federation) SMU Mustangs
31	DF	Ella Ottey	12 August 2005 (aged 19)	0	0	(United States Soccer Federation) Wisconsin Badgers
32	MF	Carly Wickenheiser	6 March 1997 (aged 27)	0	0	(Swedish Football Association) Häcken

=== China ===
Coach: (Australia) Ante Milicic

A 26-player squad was announced on 24 January 2025.

No.	Pos.	Player	Date of birth (age)	Caps	Goals	Club
1	GK	Xu Huan	6 March 1999 (aged 25)			(Chinese Football Association) Jiangsu
2	DF	Li Mengwen	28 March 1995 (aged 29)			(The Football Association) West Ham United
3	DF	Chen Qiaozhu	8 September 1999 (aged 25)			(Chinese Football Association) Guangdong
4	DF	Dou Jiaxing	29 February 2000 (aged 24)			(Chinese Football Association) Jiangsu
5	DF	Wu Haiyan	26 February 1993 (aged 31)			(Chinese Football Association) Wuhan Jianghan University
6	MF	Zhang Xin	23 May 1992 (aged 32)			(Chinese Football Association) Shanghai Shengli
8	MF	Yao Wei	1 September 1997 (aged 27)			(Chinese Football Association) Wuhan Jianghan University
9	MF	Shen Mengyu	19 August 2001 (aged 23)			(The Football Association) London City Lionesses
10	MF	Wang Yanwen	27 March 1999 (aged 25)			(French Football Federation) Dijon
12	GK	Peng Shimeng	12 May 1998 (aged 26)			(Chinese Football Association) Guangdong
15	FW	Yuan Cong	17 April 2000 (aged 24)			(Chinese Football Association) Guangdong
16	MF	Liu Jing	24 April 1998 (aged 26)			(Chinese Football Association) Changchun Dazhong Zhuoyue
17	FW	Wu Chengshu	26 August 1996 (aged 28)			(French Football Federation) Dijon
18	FW	Shao Ziqin	24 February 2003 (aged 21)			(Chinese Football Association) Jiangsu
22	FW	Miao Siwen	24 January 1995 (aged 30)			(Chinese Football Association) Shanghai Shengli
23	MF	Wang Aifang	15 January 2006 (aged 19)			(Chinese Football Association) Liaoning Shenbei Hefeng
24	GK	Pan Hongyan	30 December 2004 (aged 20)			(Chinese Football Association) Beijing
26	MF	Zhi Jie	22 March 1998 (aged 26)			(Chinese Football Association) Hangzhou Bank
28	FW	Tang Jiali	16 March 1995 (aged 29)			(Chinese Football Association) Shanghai Shengli
30	MF	Huo Yuexin	8 March 2005 (aged 19)			(Chinese Football Association) Jiangsu
32	DF	Wang Siqian	8 June 2004 (aged 20)			(Chinese Football Association) Shanghai Shengli
33	FW	Jin Kun	4 October 1999 (aged 25)			(Chinese Football Association) Jiangsu
34	FW	Sun Fangxin	6 July 2003 (aged 21)			(Chinese Football Association) Shandong Sports Lottery
40	DF	Yang Xi	5 January 2001 (aged 24)			(Chinese Football Association) Jiangsu
41	DF	Zhai Qingwei	24 September 1996 (aged 28)			(Chinese Football Association) Jiangsu
45	DF	Wang Linlin	4 August 2000 (aged 24)			(Chinese Football Association) Shanghai Shengli

=== Chinese Taipei ===
Coach: (Hong Kong) Chan Hiu Ming

A 26-player squad was announced on 10 February 2025.

No.	Pos.	Player	Date of birth (age)	Caps	Goals	Club
1	GK	Wang Yu-ting	27 May 2001 (aged 23)			(Chinese Taipei Football Association) New Taipei Hang Yuen
2	DF	Chang Chi-lan	18 September 1996 (aged 28)			(Chinese Taipei Football Association) Taichung Blue Whale
3	DF	Su Sin-yun	20 November 1996 (aged 28)			(Chinese Taipei Football Association) New Taipei Hang Yuen
4	MF	Yu Wen-chie	31 October 2000 (aged 24)			(Chinese Taipei Football Association) Kaohsiung Attackers
5	DF	Pan Shin-yu	3 May 1997 (aged 27)			(Chinese Taipei Football Association) Kaohsiung Attackers
6	DF	Teng Pei-lin	10 June 2002 (aged 22)			(Chinese Taipei Football Association) New Taipei Hang Yuen
8	MF	Li Yi-wen	20 September 2005 (aged 19)			Unattached
9	MF	Hsu Yi-yun	29 April 1997 (aged 27)			(Chinese Taipei Football Association) Sunny Bank AC Taipei
11	FW	He Jia-shiuan	7 May 2005 (aged 19)			(Chinese Taipei Football Association) New Taipei Hang Yuen
12	MF	Pu Hsin-hui	12 September 2005 (aged 19)			(Chinese Taipei Football Association) New Taipei Hang Yuen
13	MF	Chan Pi-han	27 April 1992 (aged 32)			(Chinese Taipei Football Association) Kaohsiung Attackers
14	DF	Wu Kai-ching	14 November 1999 (aged 25)			(Chinese Taipei Football Association) Kaohsiung Attackers
16	MF	Liu Yu-chiao	14 December 2005 (aged 19)			(Chinese Taipei Football Association) New Taipei Hang Yuen
17	MF	Chen Jin-wen	13 June 2003 (aged 21)			(Chinese Taipei Football Association) Taichung Blue Whale
18	GK	Wang Ruo-ping	7 March 2006 (aged 18)			Unattached
19	FW	Su Yu-hsuan	21 February 2001 (aged 23)			(Chinese Football Association) Hangzhou Bank
20	DF	Chen Ying-hui	5 October 1998 (aged 26)			(Chinese Taipei Football Association) Taichung Blue Whale
21	MF	Lin Hsin-hui	6 February 2002 (aged 23)			(Chinese Football Association) Guangxi Pingguo
22	DF	Li Pei-jung	25 April 2000 (aged 24)			(Chinese Taipei Football Association) Taichung Blue Whale
23	MF	Matsunaga Saki	26 December 1995 (aged 29)			(Chinese Taipei Football Association) New Taipei Hang Yuen
24	DF	Lee Wan-chen	22 November 1997 (aged 27)			(Chinese Taipei Football Association) Kaohsiung Attackers
25	MF	Zeng Yun-qing	14 February 2000 (aged 25)			(Chinese Taipei Football Association) Sunny Bank AC Taipei
26	MF	Tseng Yun-ya				(Chinese Taipei Football Association) New Taipei Hang Yuen
28	DF	Huang Ke-sin	18 July 2003 (aged 21)			(Chinese Taipei Football Association) Taichung Blue Whale
29	FW	Yang Hsiao-chuan	23 September 2005 (aged 19)			(Chinese Taipei Football Association) Taoyuan War God
35	GK	Chiu I-hsiu	22 July 2005 (aged 19)			(Chinese Taipei Football Association) Taoyuan War God

=== Mexico ===
Coach: (Spain) Pedro López

A 23-player squad was announced on 13 February 2025.

No.	Pos.	Player	Date of birth (age)	Caps	Goals	Club
1	GK	Itzel González	14 August 1994 (aged 30)	20	0	(Mexican Football Federation) UANL
2	DF	Kenti Robles	15 February 1991 (aged 34)	100	3	(Mexican Football Federation) Pachuca
3	DF	Annia Mejia	12 March 1996 (aged 28)	4	0	(Mexican Football Federation) Juárez
4	MF	Karla Nieto	9 January 1995 (aged 30)	54	1	(Mexican Football Federation) Pachuca
5	DF	Karol Bernal	2 February 2003 (aged 22)	3	0	(Mexican Football Federation) Monterrey
6	DF	Aaliyah Farmer	27 October 2003 (aged 21)	0	0	(Mexican Football Federation) UANL
7	FW	Myra Delgadillo	9 December 1995 (aged 29)	17	2	(Mexican Football Federation) Pachuca
8	MF	Alexia Delgado	9 December 1999 (aged 25)	47	2	(Mexican Football Federation) UANL
9	MF	Montserrat Saldívar	20 September 2006 (aged 18)	3	0	(Mexican Football Federation) América
10	MF	Alice Soto	26 March 2006 (aged 18)	3	2	(Mexican Football Federation) Monterrey
11	MF	Jacqueline Ovalle	19 October 1999 (aged 25)	57	20	(Mexican Football Federation) UANL
12	GK	Blanca Félix	2 November 1996 (aged 28)	1	0	(Mexican Football Federation) Guadalajara
13	MF	Mayra Pelayo-Bernal	29 January 1997 (aged 28)	12	2	(Mexican Football Federation) Tijuana
14	DF	Greta Espinoza	5 June 1995 (aged 29)	55	5	(Mexican Football Federation) UANL
15	MF	Jasmine Casarez	7 January 1997 (aged 28)	16	5	(Mexican Football Federation) Juárez
16	DF	Reyna Reyes	16 February 2001 (aged 24)	14	0	(United States Soccer Federation) Portland Thorns
17	FW	Christina Burkenroad	12 July 1993 (aged 31)	10	5	(Mexican Football Federation) Monterrey
18	MF	Fátima Servín	17 May 2005 (aged 19)	3	0	(Mexican Football Federation) Monterrey
19	MF	Nicole Pérez	30 August 2001 (aged 23)	13	4	(Mexican Football Federation) Monterrey
20	DF	Nicolette Hernández	17 February 1999 (aged 26)	20	1	(Mexican Football Federation) América
21	GK	Esthefanny Barreras	2 November 1996 (aged 28)	19	0	(Mexican Football Federation) Pachuca
22	MF	Diana García	11 November 1999 (aged 25)	22	3	(Mexican Football Federation) Monterrey
23	DF	Kimberly Rodríguez	26 March 1999 (aged 25)	24	1	(Mexican Football Federation) América

== Player representation ==
=== By club ===
Clubs with 3 or more players represented are listed.

Players	Club
8	(Chinese Taipei) New Taipei Hang Yuen
7	(China) Jiangsu
6	(Mexico) Monterrey
5	(China) Shanghai Shengli, (Chinese Taipei) Kaohsiung Attackers, (Chinese Taipei) Taichung Blue Whale, (Mexico) UANL
4	(Mexico) Pachuca
3	(China) Guangdong, (Mexico) América

=== By club nationality ===
No. of players	Clubs
24	China
22	Chinese Taipei, Mexico
12	United States
10	England
3	France
2	Canada, Italy
1	Portugal, Sweden

=== By club federation ===
No. of players	Federation
46	AFC
36	CONCACAF
17	UEFA

=== By representatives of domestic league ===
National squad	No. of players
China	22
Chinese Taipei	22
Mexico	22
Canada	2
