= Laura Harvey =

English football manager (born 1980)

- Harvey with the Seattle Reign in 2026

Personal information
- Full name: Laura Kate Harvey
- Date of birth: 15 May 1980 (age 46)
- Place of birth: Nuneaton, Warwickshire, England

Team information
- Current team: Seattle Reign FC (head coach)

Youth career
- Coventry City

Senior career*
Years	Team	Apps	(Gls)
- Wolverhampton Wanderers
- Birmingham City

Managerial career
- 2002–2006: Birmingham City (assistant)
- 2005–2011: England U-17, U-19, U-23 (assistant)
- 2006–2008: Birmingham City
- 2008–2010: Arsenal (assistant)
- 2010–2012: Arsenal
- 2013–2017: Seattle Reign FC
- 2017: United States U-23 (interim)
- 2018–2019: Utah Royals FC
- 2020–2021: United States U-20
- 2020–2021: United States (assistant)
- 2021–: Seattle Reign FC
- * Club domestic league appearances and goals

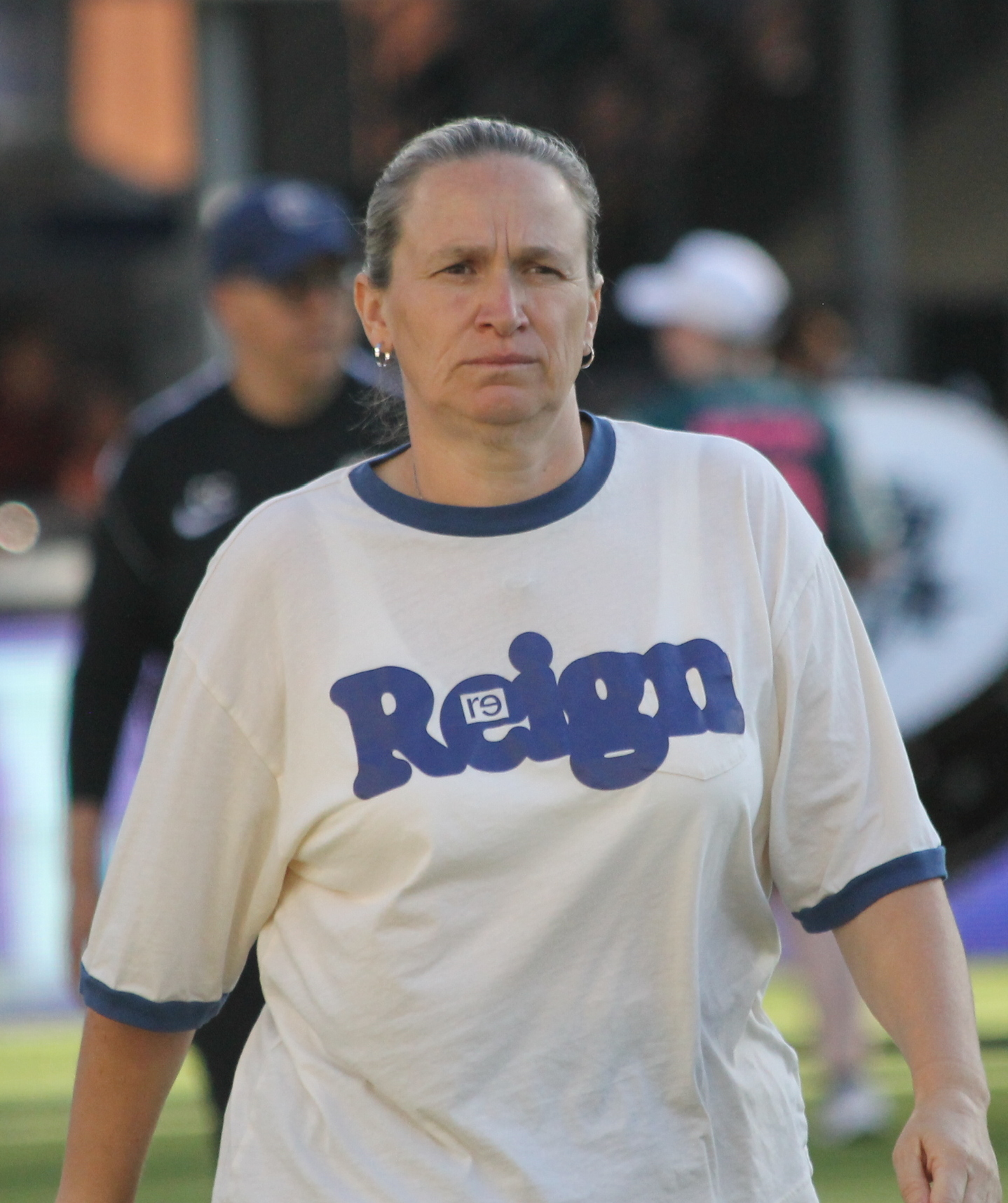
Harvey with the Seattle Reign in 2026

Laura Kate Harvey (born 15 May 1980) is an English football manager and former player who currently manages Seattle Reign FC of the American National Women's Soccer League (NWSL). She holds USSF "A" and UEFA "A" coaching licences.

Harvey previously managed the United States women's national under-20 soccer team, Utah Royals FC, Arsenal, and Birmingham City. She was an assistant coach with the United States women's national soccer team as well as England's U-17, U-19 and U-23 national teams.

Harvey was named FA WSL Manager of the Year in 2011 after guiding Arsenal to win the league title, FA Cup, and Continental Cup. She was named NWSL Coach of the Year in 2014, 2015, and 2021. She was the second woman to earn a U.S. Soccer Pro Licence. Harvey is the first coach in NWSL history to coach 200 regular season games. As of July 2023, she holds the NWSL record for most regular season wins.

== Early life ==
Harvey grew up in Bulkington, a village in Warwickshire in the West Midlands region of England. She attended The George Eliot School in Nuneaton. Her father was a full-time high school teacher and a football coach who worked for The Football Association (FA) and Coventry City F.C. during her childhood. She would often attend men's Premier League games with her father where he taught her and her brother to "not just watch the ball, but everything else that's going on."

Harvey began playing football at a young age on boys teams and in neighborhood pickup games along with Laura Bassett as there was no youth girls league available. As a teenager, Harvey played for Coventry City L.F.C. for six years. She graduated from the University of Wolverhampton with a bachelor's degree in Sports Studies.

== Playing career ==
At age 22, Harvey ruptured her ACL while playing for Birmingham City; she subsequently retired from playing. She previously played for Wolverhampton Wanderers W.F.C.

== Managerial career ==
=== Club ===
==== Birmingham City, 2002–2007 ====
Harvey was named assistant coach for Birmingham City in 2002. In 2007, she was named team manager.

==== Arsenal, 2008–2012 ====
In 2008, Harvey joined Arsenal as its first team coach. The following year, she was hired full-time as Assistant Academy Director and Reserve Team Manager.

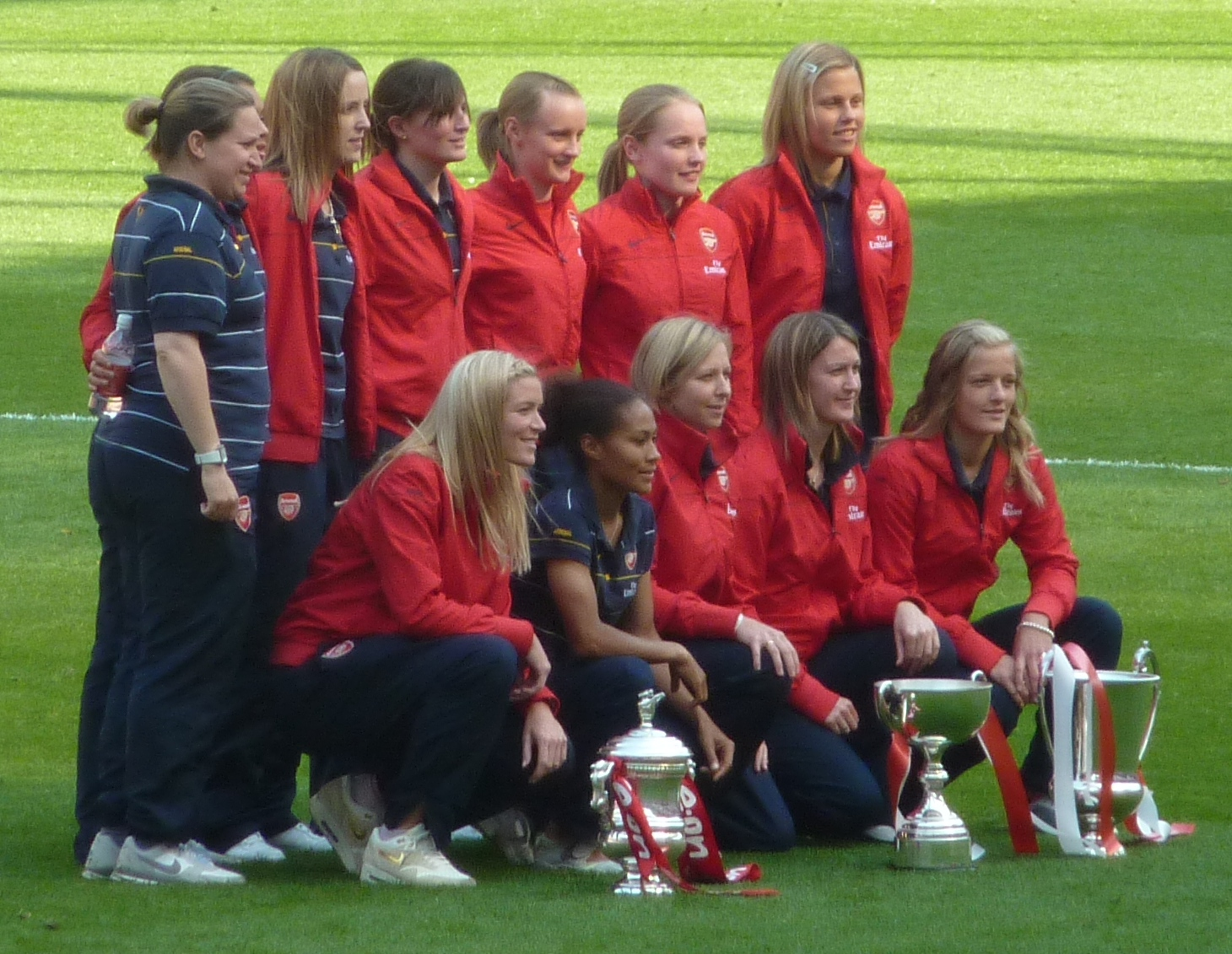
Harvey (top left) with the Arsenal LFC in 2011

In February 2010, Harvey was hired to replace Tony Gervaise as manager for Arsenal. Of her hiring, Harvey said, "It's a really proud moment for me. In women's football, especially domestically, it doesn't come any bigger than Arsenal. When you set out to coach and you know this is your dream and your love, you want to make it the best it can possibly be and in my eyes it doesn't get much bigger than this."

In 2011, Harvey was named FAWSL Manager of the Year after guiding the team to win the league title, FA Cup, and Continental Cup. She finished her tenure with Arsenal in 2012 having led the team to three consecutive league titles, two Continental Cups, and one FA Women's Cup. Harvey led the Gunners to the UEFA Women's Champions League semi-finals twice.

==== Seattle Reign FC, 2013–2017 ====
On 21 December 2012, Harvey was named head coach of Seattle Reign FC for the inaugural season of the National Women's Soccer League, a new professional league in the United States. The Reign faced a tough first half of the season and went 0–9–1 in their first ten games after all three of their American allocated players were unavailable: Hope Solo was out for wrist surgery and recovery, Amy Rodriguez was out for the season due to pregnancy, and Megan Rapinoe was returning mid-season after a six-month stint for Olympique Lyonnais. With the return of Solo, Rapinoe, and some additional lineup changes made during the early summer, the Reign turned their regular season record around and finished the season in seventh place with a 5–14–3 record. In August 2013, Harvey signed a contract extension with the Reign through 2017. She left the club in November 2017.

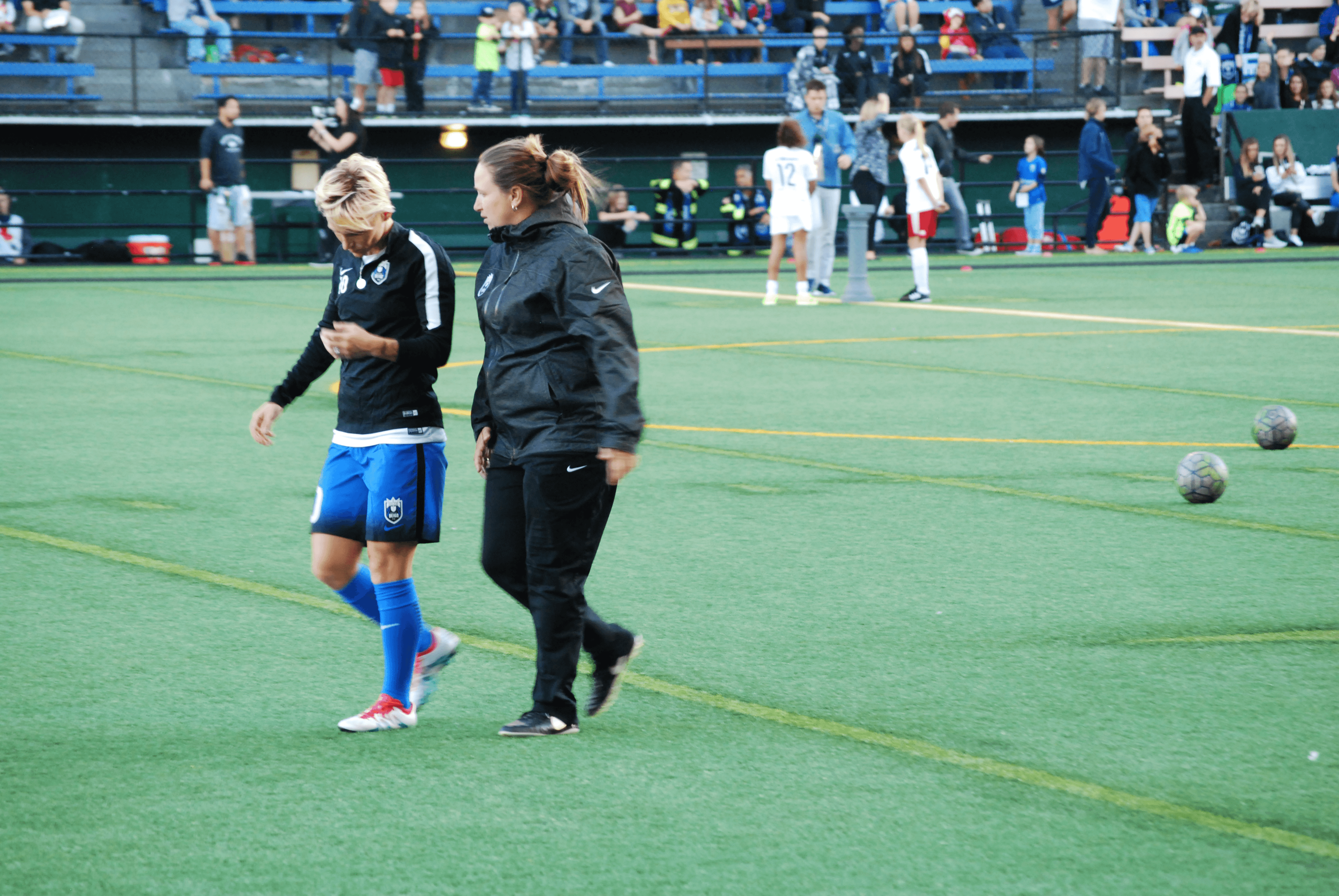
Harvey (right) with Jess Fishlock, September 2016

During the 2014 season, Harvey led the Reign to set a league record unbeaten streak of 16 games during the first part of the season. During the 16 game stretch, the team compiled a 13–0–3 record. The Reign finished first in the regular season clinching the NWSL Shield for the first time. After defeating the Washington Spirit 2–1 in the playoff semi-finals, the Reign were defeated 2–1 by FC Kansas City during the championship final. Following the regular season, Harvey was named the league's Coach of the Year. In December 2014, she was named FA Coach of the Year by the FA, and was a finalist for the FIFA World Coach of the Year.

During the 2015 season, Harvey led the Reign to finish first in the regular season clinching the NWSL Shield for the second consecutive season. After defeating the Washington Spirit 3–0 in a playoff semi-final, the Reign were defeated 1–0 by FC Kansas City during the championship final in Portland. Following the 2015 regular season, Harvey was named NWSL Coach of the Year for the second consecutive time.

On 7 November 2017, the Reign announced that Harvey had stepped down as head coach and general manager, and that the team had hired FC Kansas City coach Vlatko Andonovski, who had defeated Harvey's Reign FC teams in the 2014 and 2015 NWSL championship matches, on her recommendation.

==== Utah Royals FC, 2018–2020 ====
On 27 November 2017, Utah Royals FC announced Harvey as their first head coach.

The Royals launched with players primarily sourced from the defunct FC Kansas City, which had spent almost all of the 2017 season out of playoff contention. The team's struggles continued in Utah during the 2018 season, playing five winless matches before their first victory on 5 May against Washington Spirit. The team then went on a 5–2–2 run that kept them in contention for the table's fourth-place spot and playoff qualification, then added mid-season reinforcements of Christen Press, Samantha Johnson, and Makenzy Doniak. However, the Royals stumbled into a three-match losing streak in July, and a 4–1–2 finish was not enough to qualify for the postseason.

Despite a strong 5–2–2 start to the 2019 season, the Royals finished the season 5–8–2 and were eliminated from NWSL playoff contention for the second consecutive season after losing to Chicago Red Stars on 28 September 2019.

While she initially expected to return to Utah for the 2020 season, on 7 January 2020 Royals FC announced that Harvey had accepted an appointment from U.S. Soccer to manage its under-20 women's team.

==== Seattle Reign FC, 2021– ====
Harvey returned to the Reign as head coach, where she previously coached from 2013 to 2017, after the 2020 Summer Olympics in August 2021.

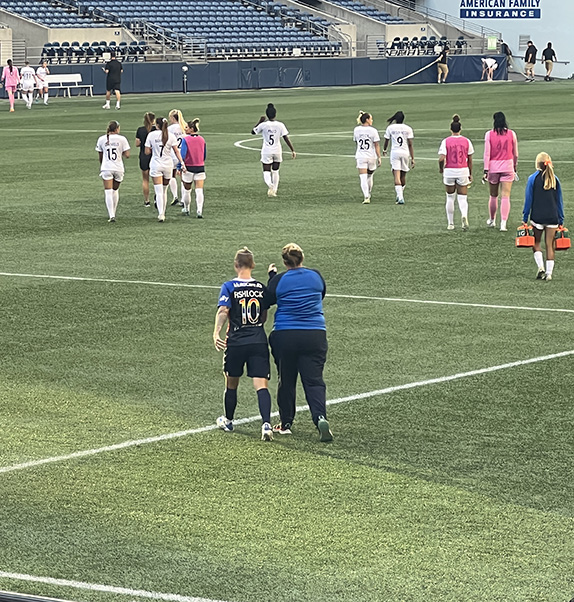
Jess Fishlock and Laura Harvey at Lumen Field in Seattle, July 2022

The Reign finished second in the 2021 season with a 13–8–3 season record, and 7–2–2 record under Harvey, but lost to Washington Spirit 1–2 in the playoff semi-finals. Harvey was named 2021 NWSL Coach of the Year by a vote of owners, general managers, coaches, media, players, and fans; the 2022 win was her third.

In 2022, the Reign finished atop the NWSL table with a 11–4–7 record and won its third NWSL Shield, all under Harvey, but lost to Kansas City Current 0–2 in the playoff semi-finals. The Reign also finished atop the West Division of the 2022 NWSL Challenge Cup group stage with an undefeated 4–0–2 record, but fell to Washington Spirit in the playoff semi-finals 8–9 by penalty shoot-out after a scoreless draw. Harvey also led the Reign to a 2022 The Women's Cup championship, defeating Club América in the semi-finals and hosts Racing Louisville FC in the finals. Harvey was a finalist for the 2022 NWSL Coach of the Year award.

In July 2023, Harvey became the first coach in league history to coach 200 regular season games. As of July 2023, she holds the NWSL record for most regular season wins. The same month, she extended her contract as head coach through the 2025 season.

In an episode of the Soccerish podcast released on October 30, 2025, Harvey claimed to have used ChatGPT to generate suggested formations and tactics to use against NWSL opponents during the 2025 season, and after researching and reviewing the suggestions with her staff then employed ChatGPT's suggested five-back formation against two of those opponents.

=== International ===
From 2005–2011, Harvey served as assistant coach for England's U-17, U-19 and U-23 national teams.

Harvey was named as coach of the United States U-23 national team for a tournament in Spring 2017, after coaching them through a January camp. She reportedly took on an expanded role with the United States Soccer Federation following her exit from the Seattle Reign FC organization.

External videos
- Head Coach Harvey celebrates with the United States U20 national team after winning the 2020 CONCACAF Women's U-20 Championship retrieved July 23, 2023

From January 2020 to July 2021, Harvey was the head coach of the United States women's national under-20 soccer team; she also served as an assistant coach of the United States women's national soccer team. Harvey led the U-20 team on a seven-game unbeaten streak and championship win at the 2020 CONCACAF Women's U-20 Championship in the Dominican Republic. The team, which included future senior national team stars Sophia Smith, Trinity Rodman, and Naomi Girma, outscored its opponents 44-1 at the tournament. Due to the COVID-19 pandemic and subsequently cancelled FIFA U-20 Women's World Cup, Harvey had limited coaching opportunities during this time though credits the experience as a good learning and personal growth period.

== Managerial honours ==
Arsenal

- FA Women's Premier League: 2009–10
- FA Women's Super League: 2011, 2012
- FA Women's League Cup: 2011, 2012
- Women's FA Cup: 2011

Seattle Reign FC

- NWSL Shield: 2014, 2015, 2022
- The Women's Cup: 2022

United States U-20

- CONCACAF Women's U-20 Championship: 2020

Individual

- NWSL Coach of the Year: 2014, 2015, 2021
- FA Coach of the Year: 2014
- FA Pro Game Female Elite Coach of the Year: 2014
- FAWSL Manager of the Year: 2011

== See also ==
- History of professional soccer in Seattle
- List of Women's Super League managers
