= Aria Nagai =

American soccer player (born 2001)

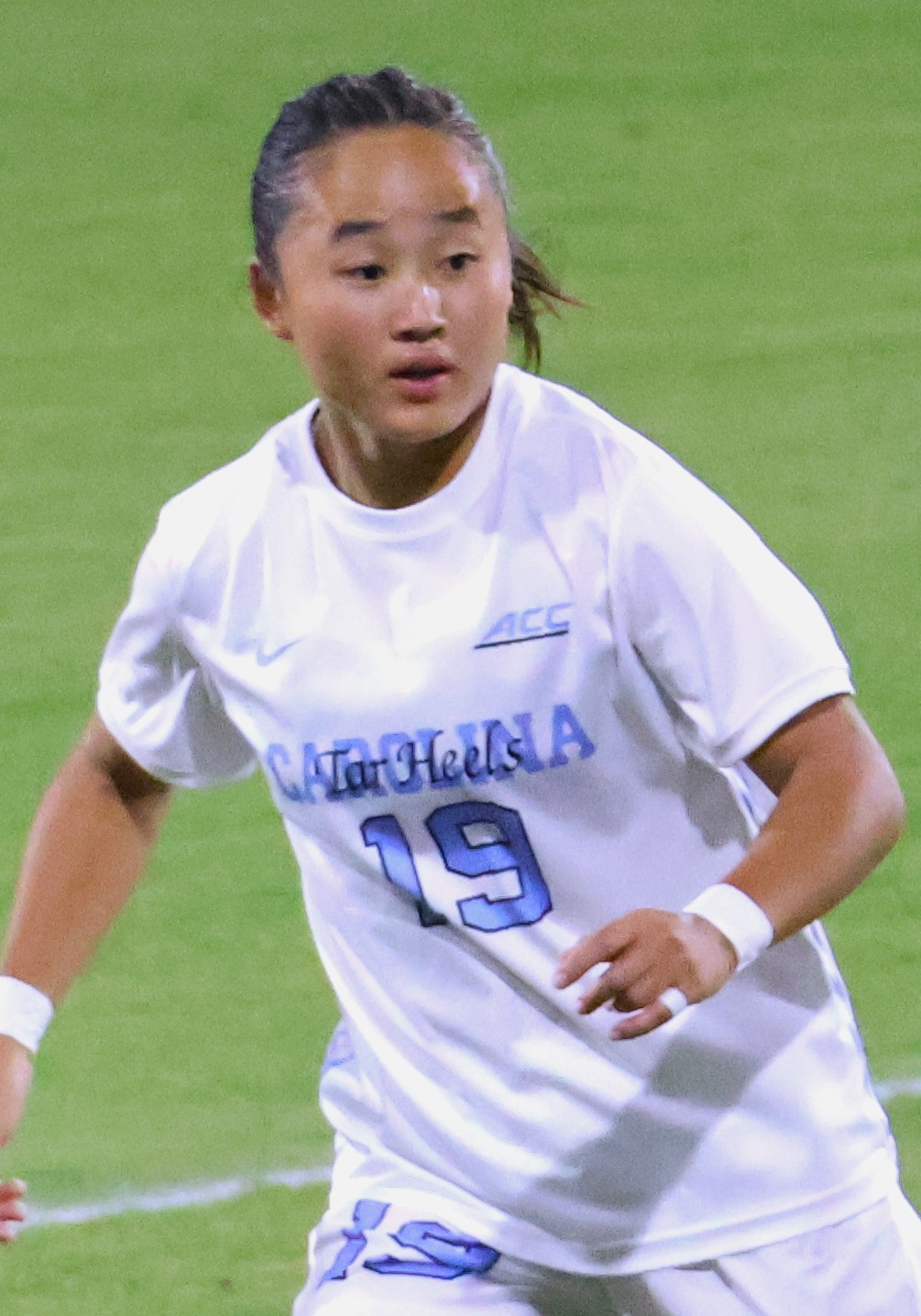
- Nagai with North Carolina in 2024

Personal information
- Full name: Aria Nagai
- Date of birth: December 8, 2001 (age 24)
- Place of birth: Herndon, Virginia, U.S.
- Height: 5 ft 3 in (1.60 m)
- Position: Midfielder

Team information
- Current team: Dallas Trinity (on loan from the Utah Royals)
- Number: 19

Youth career
- Braddock Road Youth Club

College career
Years	Team	Apps	(Gls)
2021–2023	Princeton Tigers	55	(2)
2024	North Carolina Tar Heels	27	(3)

Senior career*
Years	Team	Apps	(Gls)
2025–	Utah Royals	16	(0)
2026–	→ Dallas Trinity (loan)	0	(0)
- * Club domestic league appearances and goals as of May 10, 2026

Aria Nagai (born December 8, 2001) is an American professional soccer player who plays as a midfielder for USL Super League club Dallas Trinity, on loan from the Utah Royals. She played college soccer for the Princeton Tigers and the North Carolina Tar Heels, winning the 2024 national championship with the Tar Heels.

== Early life ==
Nagai was raised in Herndon, Virginia, the middle of three children born to Masaaki and Yuka Nagai. She played multiple sports growing up, including tennis, swimming, gymnastics, and figure skating. She began playing soccer when she was about ten after watching the Japan national team win the 2011 FIFA Women's World Cup. She played ECNL club soccer for Braddock Road Youth Club. She played high school soccer at Chantilly High School, in Fairfax County, Virginia, and was named the Virginia Gatorade Player of the Year in 2020.

== College career ==
After her freshman season was cancelled due to the COVID-19 pandemic, Nagai played three seasons for the Princeton Tigers from 2021 to 2023, making 55 appearances (42 starts) and scoring 2 goals. She received All–Ivy League honors two times, including once on the first team.

Nagai joined the North Carolina Tar Heels as a graduate transfer in 2024, starting all 27 games and scoring 3 goals. Two of those goals came in the span of about two minutes during a 4–2 away loss to the defending national champions Florida State. In the semifinals of the ACC tournament, Nagai assisted Trinity Armstrong's go-ahead goal from a corner kick in a 2–1 win against Duke. In the NCAA tournament, she played every minute of the last three rounds as North Carolina won its 23rd national title and first since 2012.

== Club career ==
Nagai joined the Utah Royals as a non-roster trialist in the 2025 preseason, soon impressing head coach Jimmy Coenraets and the coaching staff. She said she hadn't planned to play professionally but welcomed the opportunity. On March 4, the Royals announced that they had signed Nagai to a short-term salary cap exempt contract. She made her professional debut on April 25, replacing Cece Delzer as a second-half substitute in a 1–0 road loss to the Houston Dash. On August 3, soon after signing a new salary cap exempt contract until the end of the season, she made her next appearance and first professional start in a 1–1 draw with the reigning champion Orlando Pride.

On December 10, 2025, after making 11 appearances during her rookie season, she signed a one-year contract extension with the Royals on a salary cap exempt deal.

On July 31, 2026, Nagai was sent on loan to USL Super League club Dallas Trinity for the rest of the year.

== Honors and awards ==
North Carolina Tar Heels

- NCAA Division I women's soccer tournament: 2024

Individual

- First-team All-Ivy: 2023
- Second-team All-Ivy: 2023
