= Casey Stoney =

English football manager (born 1982)

Casey Stoney MBE
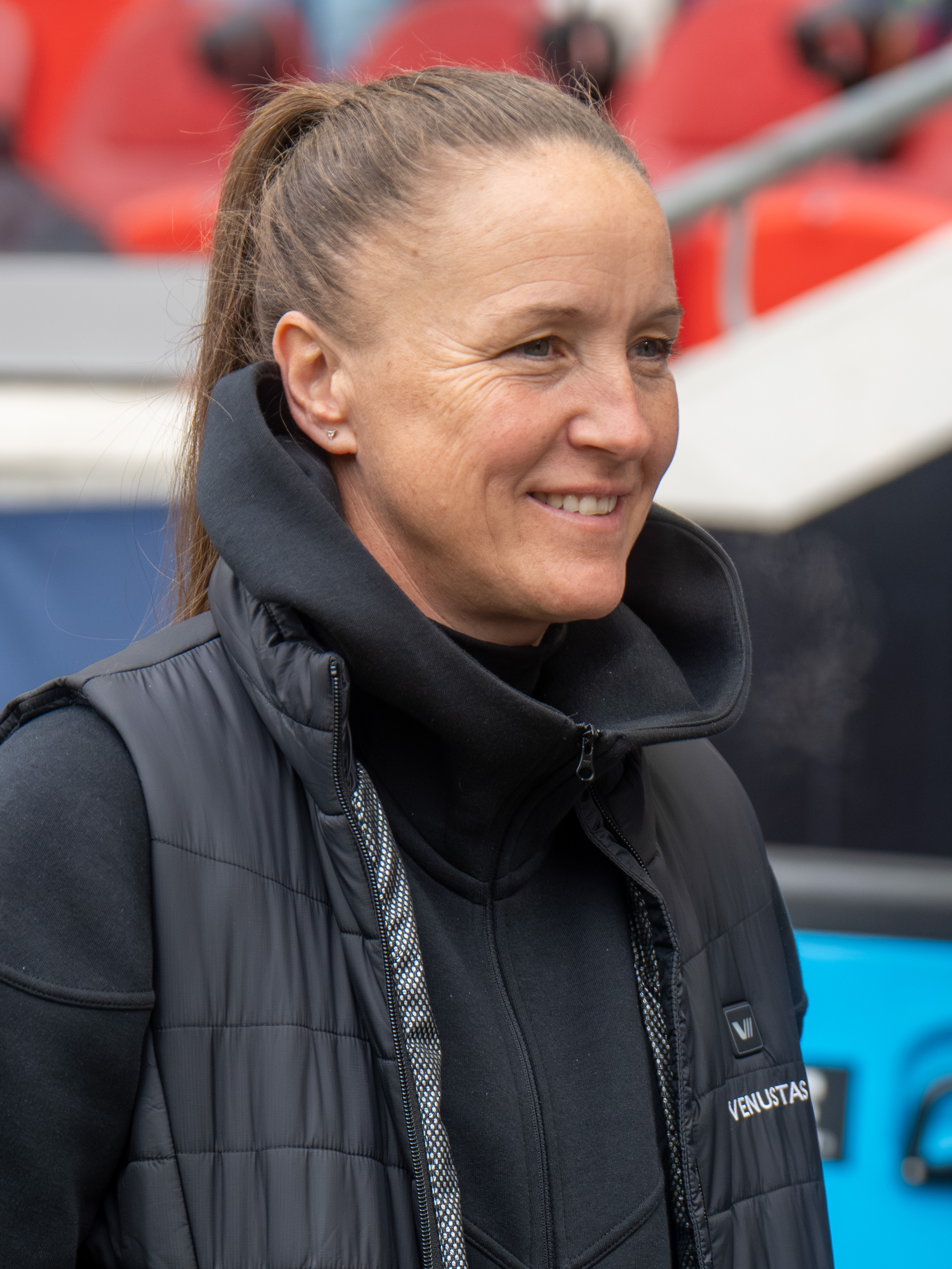
- Stoney in 2026

Personal information
- Full name: Casey Jean Stoney
- Date of birth: 13 May 1982 (age 44)
- Place of birth: Basildon, England
- Height: 5 ft 9 in (1.74 m)
- Position: Defender

Youth career
- 1994–1998: Chelsea
- 1998–1999: Arsenal

Senior career*
Years	Team	Apps	(Gls)
1999–2002	Arsenal		
2002–2007	Charlton Athletic		
2007–2011	Chelsea		
2011–2013	Lincoln	38	(1)
2014–2016	Arsenal	39	(5)
2016–2018	Liverpool	14	(1)

International career
2000–2017	England	130	(6)
2012	Great Britain	5	(1)

Managerial career
- 2009: Chelsea
- 2009: England (assistant)
- 2018–2021: Manchester United
- 2021–2024: San Diego Wave
- 2025–: Canada
Medal record
Women's football
Representing England
FIFA Women's World Cup
Bronze medal – third place	2015 Canada
UEFA Women's Championship
Silver medal – second place	2009 Finland
- * Club domestic league appearances and goals

Casey Jean Stoney MBE (born 13 May 1982) is an English professional football manager and former player who currently serves as the head coach of the Canada women's national soccer team.

A versatile defender, she was capped more than 100 times for the England women's national football team since making her debut in 2000. After being a non-playing squad member at UEFA Women's Euro 2005, she was an integral part of the England teams which reached the UEFA Women's Euro 2009 final and the quarter finals of the FIFA Women's World Cup in 2007 and 2011. In 2012, Stoney succeeded Faye White as the England captain and also became captain of the newly formed Great Britain squad for the 2012 Summer Olympics. She ended her playing career at Liverpool Ladies.

She was the first head coach of the newly formed Manchester United Women from June 2018 to May 2021. In the inaugural season, United won the FA Women's Championship title and promotion to the FA WSL. On 14 July 2021, Stoney was announced as the head coach of San Diego Wave FC of the National Women's Soccer League (NWSL). The Wave fired Stoney in 2024 following a seven-game winless streak.

== Club career ==
=== Chelsea and Arsenal ===
Stoney joined Chelsea Ladies, aged 12, before moving to Arsenal Ladies in 1999.

=== Charlton Athletic ===
Already an England international, Stoney joined Charlton Athletic Ladies in the summer of 2002 in search of regular first-team football. She also took up a scholarship at The Football Association's National Player Development Centre at Loughborough University. In a successful first season Stoney captained Charlton to their first FA Women's Cup final.

She led Charlton to success in the FA Women's Premier League Cup in 2004, the FA Women's Cup in 2005 as Charlton beat Everton 1–0, and the 2–1 victory over Arsenal in the 2006 Premier League Cup. When Charlton disbanded their entire women's section following the relegation of Charlton Athletic men's team in 2007, Stoney said:

I'm disgusted with the club – the men get relegated and we get punished. The club's only trophies in recent years have been won by the women's team – and in the last four seasons we were the only side apart from Arsenal to win major honours. Seven weeks ago we played in front of a record crowd at the FA Cup final – that's now our last match and I'm totally gutted for everyone involved on the women's side. I just hope that what has happened to us doesn't reverberate around the women's game – otherwise it will be in serious trouble.

=== Return to Chelsea ===
In July 2007, she signed for Chelsea Ladies along with Charlton and England teammate Eniola Aluko. In February 2009, she became player-manager until the end of the season, following the resignation of Steve Jones. Her first match as player-manager was a 3-1 victory over OOH Lincoln. At Stoney's recommendation, Matt Beard took over as manager for 2009–10.

=== Lincoln ===
On 13 March 2010, Stoney announced on Twitter that she had signed for FA WSL rivals Lincoln Ladies to play alongside England stars such as Sue Smith and Jess Clarke. Stoney stated that Lincoln offered the prospect of full-time training, which Chelsea were unable to match. Keith Boanas, her manager at Charlton, revealed that Stoney is a Chelsea supporter so found the decision extremely difficult.

=== Return to Arsenal ===
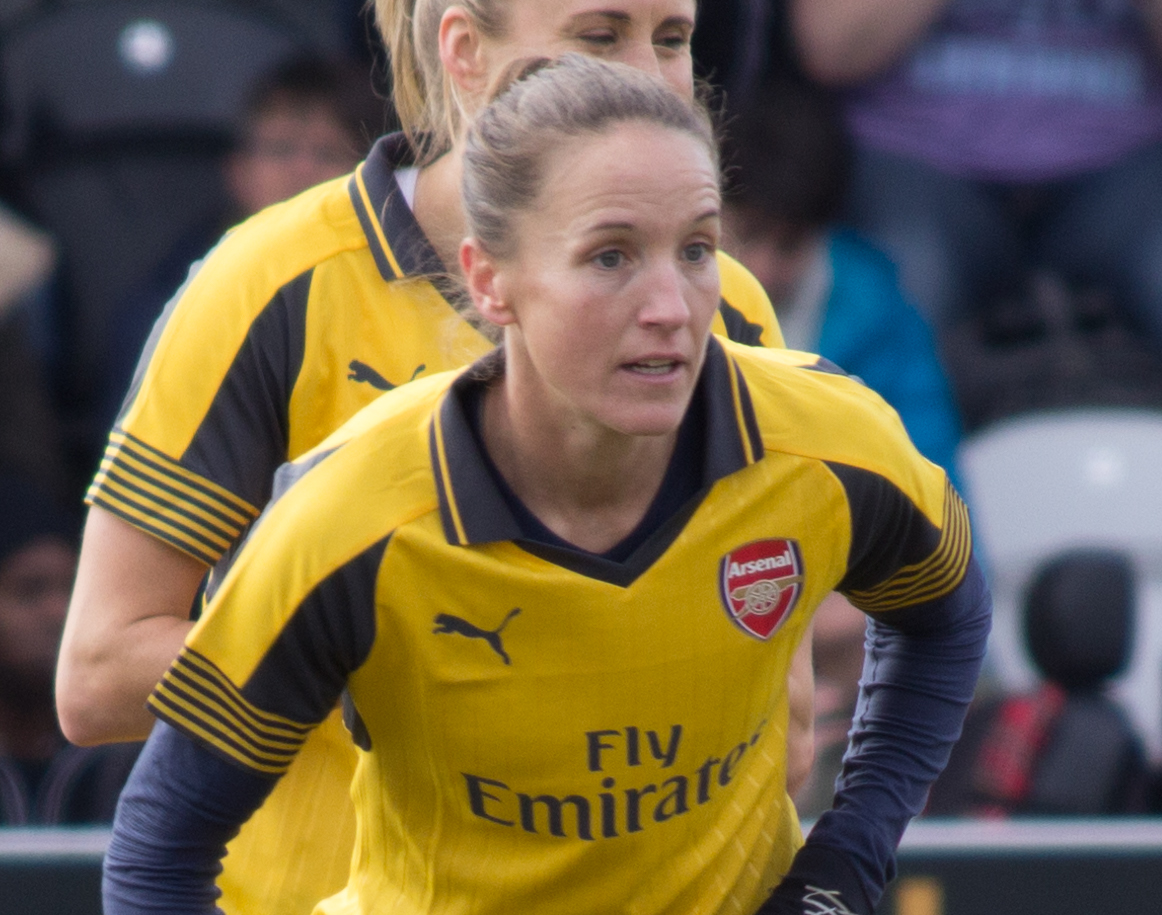
Stoney representing Arsenal in 2017

Stoney re-joined Arsenal on a two-year deal for the 2014 season, citing her desire to win more trophies.

=== Liverpool ===
On 13 December 2016, Liverpool confirmed that Stoney had signed with the club. She played her last match at the club on 21 February 2018. She subsequently retired to take a role in Phil Neville's backroom team in the England women's national team.

Stoney was inducted into the WSL Hall of Fame in April 2026.

== International career ==
=== England ===
Stoney came through England's under-age squads, making her debut for the senior team in August 2000 as a substitute against France. She was named in the provisional 30-player squad for Euro 2001 but did not make the final list of 20 and remained on the standby list. She made her first start in March 2002 against Norway, and, after spells in central defence and at right back, went on to become England's first choice left back. In February 2003 Stoney wore the captain's armband when regular skipper Karen Walker was substituted in a 1–0 friendly defeat by Italy. Her first senior international goal came as England beat Portugal 4–0 in the Algarve Cup in March 2005.

Stoney was named in the squad for Euro 2005, hosted in England, but remained unused as the hosts made a group stage exit. Her disappointment was such that she considered retiring from international football. But by the 2007 FIFA Women's World Cup in China, Stoney, preferred to Rachel Unitt at left back, was one of four England players to play every minute of every match as they lost a quarter final 3–0 to the United States. Stoney won the Nationwide International Player of the Year award for the 2007–08 season, ahead of Anita Asante and Alex Scott. In May 2009, Stoney was one of the first 17 female players to be given central contracts by The Football Association (FA).

At the Euro 2009 final tournament in Finland, Stoney recovered from a red card in a 2–1 opening match defeat by Italy to help England reach the final. Stoney explained that for many players this was not only the best moment of their careers, but possibly the happiest moment in their lives.

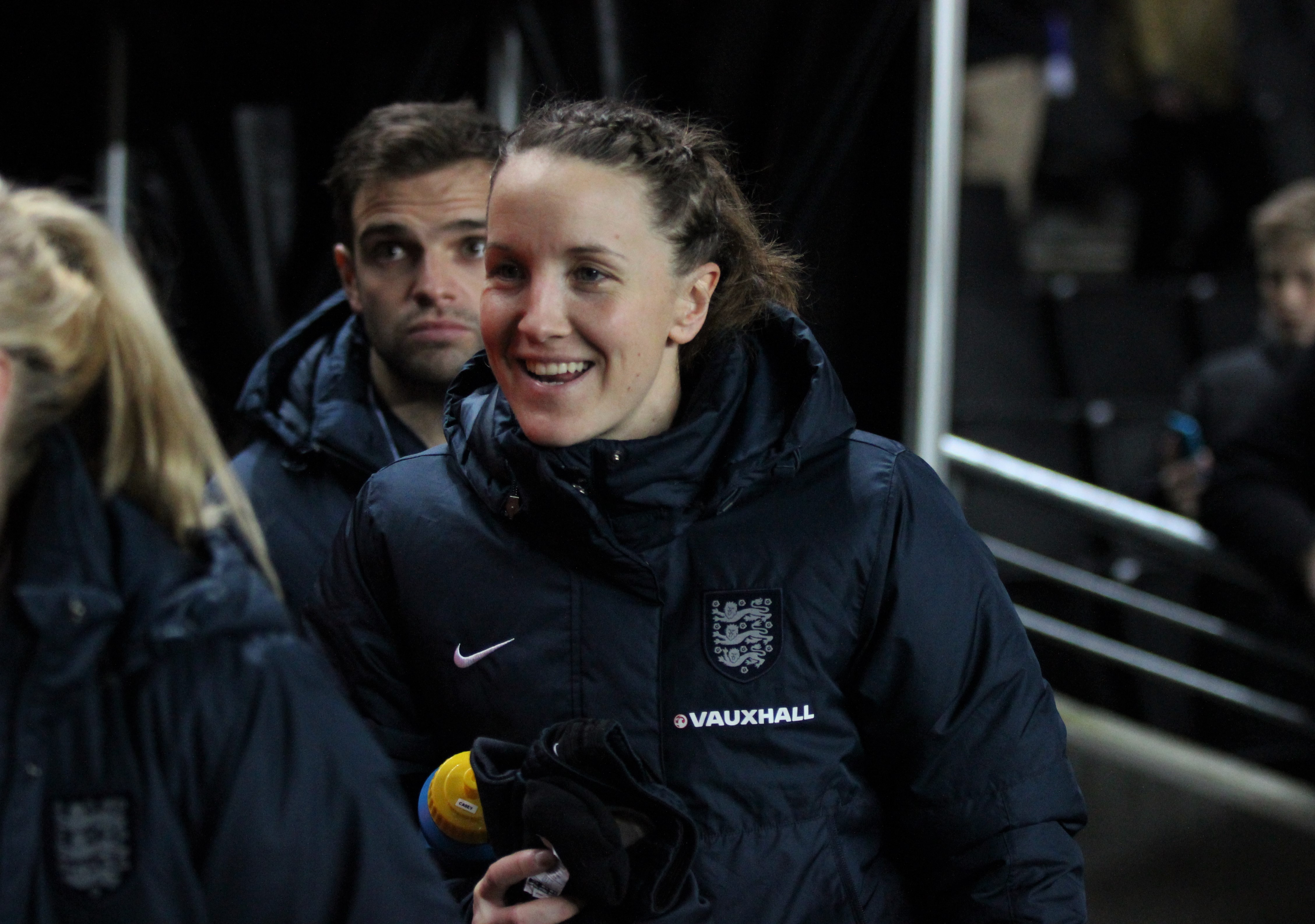
Stoney with England in 2015

Stoney started all four of England's games at the 2011 FIFA Women's World Cup, and converted her kick in the quarter-final penalty shoot-out defeat to France. When pregnant Faye White retired from international football in 2012, Hope Powell appointed Stoney as the new England captain. "It's an absolute honour, the biggest privilege I've ever been given," was Stoney's response.

In 2013, Stoney became the first female member of the Professional Footballers' Association's management committee. She led England into their Euro 2013 campaign but the team performed poorly and finished in last place, to her "bitter disappointment". When England's longstanding manager Hope Powell was sacked, Stoney was left out of new boss Mark Sampson's first squad due to a foot injury. Sampson informed Stoney that her captaincy was under review, a decision she understood. Steph Houghton was then named as her successor as captain.

After being called for her third straight World Cup, Stoney said the 2015 FIFA Women's World Cup in Canada would be her last. Mostly coming out of the bench, Stoney was part of the first English team to qualify for the semi-finals. She was part of the England squad which reached the semi-finals of UEFA Women's Euro 2017. She played her last international match against Denmark on 1 July 2017.

She was allotted 134 when the FA announced their legacy numbers scheme to honour the 50th anniversary of England's inaugural international.

=== Great Britain ===
In June 2012, Stoney was named in the 18-player Great Britain squad formed for the 2012 Summer Olympics. The group was selected by England manager Hope Powell and comprised 16 English players plus Scots Kim Little and Ifeoma Dieke. Stoney was confirmed in her role as captain. Stoney scored in the team's second group stage match, a 3–0 win over Cameroon. After winning all three matches and finishing at the top of the table for Group E, Great Britain advanced to the quarter finals where they faced Canada in front of 28,828 spectators at City of Coventry Stadium. Stoney was disappointed when Great Britain lost 2–0 and were knocked out. She argued for the continued participation of Great Britain at future Olympic football tournaments. England's third-place finish at the 2015 FIFA Women's World Cup secured Great Britain's qualification for the 2016 Summer Olympics, but the team were blocked from competing due to political infighting among the "Home Nations". A 2016 UEFA Women's Olympic Qualifying Tournament was convened instead.

== Managerial career ==
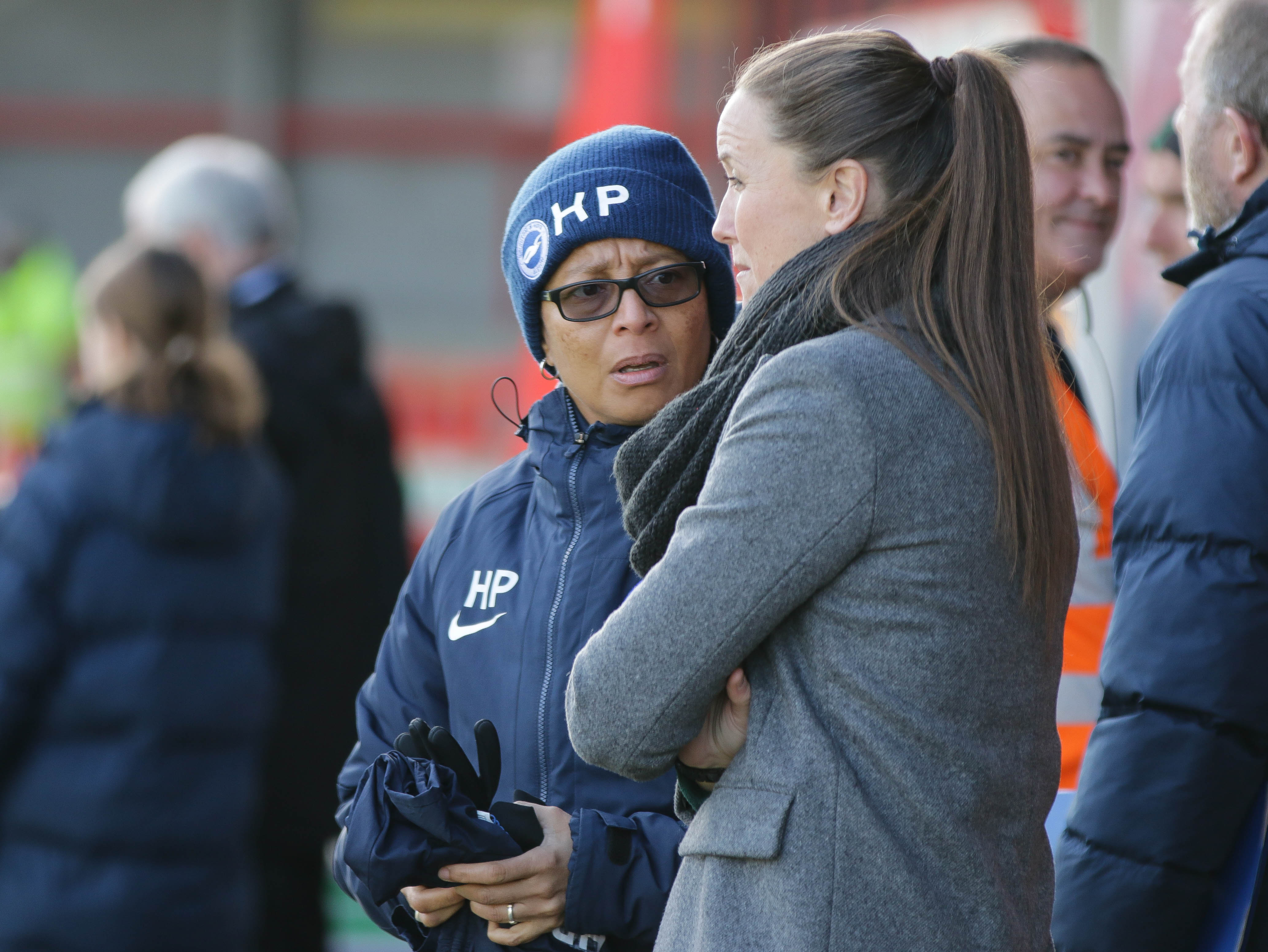
Stoney (right) as Manchester United head coach in 2019, in conversation with her former England manager Hope Powell

=== Chelsea ===
In February 2009, she became Chelsea Ladies' player-manager until June 2009, following the resignation of Steve Jones.

=== England ===
Following her retirement in 2018, Stoney joined Phil Neville's backroom team in the England women's national team.

=== Manchester United ===
On 8 June 2018, Stoney was appointed as the first head coach of the newly formed Manchester United Women. Stoney's first game in charge of United was a North West derby victory in the League Cup. In the inaugural season, United won the FA Women's Championship title and promotion to the FA WSL; winning 18 of 20 games and losing only once. In addition to the division title, Stoney guided United to an FA Cup quarter-final and League Cup semi-final, beating four WSL teams in the process.

On the opening weekend of the 2019–20 FA WSL season, Stoney managed United in the team's first Manchester derby in front of a crowd of 31,213, an English domestic women's league record. Manchester United lost 1–0, but prevailed six weeks later in the League Cup to earn her and the club's first Manchester derby win, beating Manchester City 2–0. On 8 November 2019, Stoney signed a contract extension with Manchester United, keeping her at the club until 2022. During the season, Stoney was a vocal critic of the quality of refereeing within the WSL, calling it "substandard" following United's 1–0 loss to Chelsea on 17 November 2019. Stoney's United, again, drew considerable media attention in February 2020 following a controversial phantom handball penalty decision against Katie Zelem in United's 1–1 draw with Reading. On 12 May 2021, it was announced Stoney would be stepping down as Manchester United manager at the end of the season having secured a second successive fourth-place league finish, one point behind Arsenal in the final Champions League qualification spot.

=== San Diego ===
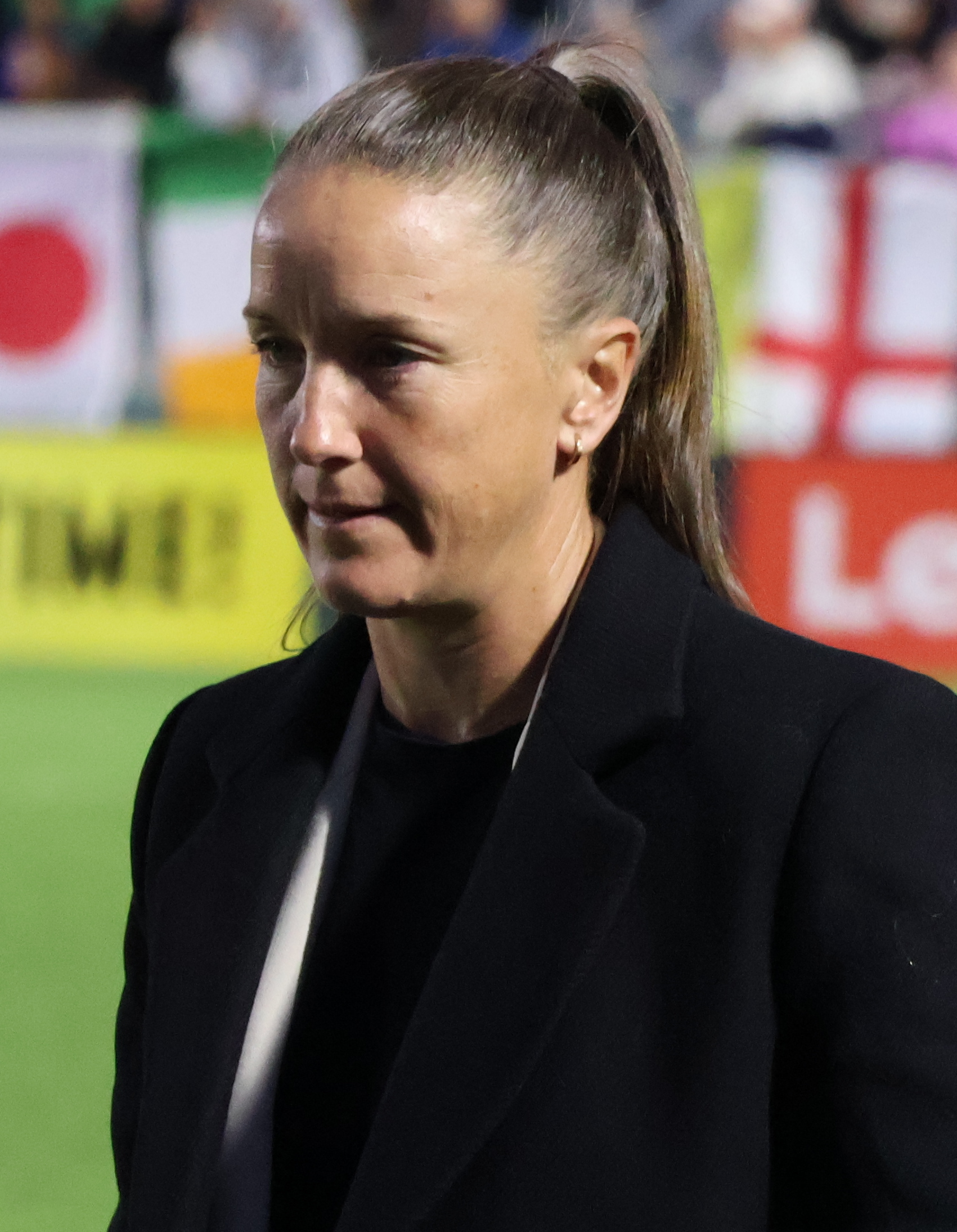
Stoney as San Diego Wave head coach in October 2023

On 14 July 2021, Stoney was announced as the inaugural head coach of National Women's Soccer League club San Diego Wave, which began play in 2022. The Wave completed its first competition under Stoney, the 2022 NWSL Challenge Cup, with a third-place group stage finish in the West Division on a 1–3–2 record. The Wave completed its first season under Stoney in third place on the league table with a 10–6–6 record. Stoney was named the league's coach of the year, Wave goalkeeper Kailen Sheridan was named the league's goalkeeper of the year, and Wave striker Alex Morgan won the league's golden boot. The Wave advanced to the NWSL Playoffs and defeated Chicago Red Stars 2–1 in extra time to advance to the semifinals, where they lost to eventual champions Portland Thorns.

In 2023, Stoney's Wave were the NWSL regular season champions after defeating Racing Louisville on the last day of the 2023 regular season, winning the NWSL 2023 Shield. Winning the shield earned them a bye to the semi-finals of the post-season, where they fell to the OL Reign on the Wave's home field of Snapdragon Stadium.

The Wave started the 2024 season by winning the one-off 2024 NWSL Challenge Cup but sat in ninth place of 14 teams midway through the season. Winless over their last seven games, the Wave fired Stoney on 24 June 2024.

=== Canada Women ===
Stoney was named head coach of the Canada women's national soccer team in January 2025, signing a contract through 2027 with an optional one-year extension; she became the permanent replacement for Bev Priestman, who departed following a drone spying scandal.

Stoney coached the team to win the 2025 Pinatar Cup. She used the tournament to assess various players in the national team pool, including in her squad selection two players from the Northern Super League, Canada's domestic professional league in its inaugural season, and giving game time to all but two players named to the roster for the competition.

In February 2026, Stoney coached Canada to a second place finish at the 2026 SheBelieves Cup, with wins over Colombia and Argentina, and a loss against the United States.

== Personal life ==
In November 2012, Stoney was named 50th on The Independent newspaper's Pink List of influential lesbian and gay people in the United Kingdom. On 10 February 2014, Stoney first publicly acknowledged that she was a lesbian. She is in a relationship with her former Lincoln team mate Megan Harris. On 16 July 2014, she announced that Harris was pregnant with twins, who were born on 8 November 2014. Stoney's third child was born on 12 December 2017.

In May 2015, the University of Essex awarded Stoney an honorary degree.

Stoney was appointed Member of the Order of the British Empire (MBE) in the 2015 Birthday Honours for services to football.

Stoney was inducted into the WSL Hall of Fame in May 2026.

== Career statistics ==
Scores and results list England's and Great Britain's goal tally first, score column indicates score after each Stoney goal.

List of international goals scored by Casey Stoney
No.	Date	Venue	Opponent	Score	Result	Competition
England goals
1	9 March 2005	Estádio de São Luís, Faro, Portugal	Portugal	1–0	4–0	2005 Algarve Cup
2	8 March 2007	National Hockey Stadium, Milton Keynes, England	Russia		6–0	Friendly
3	7 March 2009	Paralimni Stadium, Paralimni, Cyprus	France	2–2	2–2	2009 Cyprus Cup
4	1 March 2010	Larnaca, Cyprus	Switzerland	1–1	2–2	2010 Cyprus Cup
5	19 September 2012	Bescot Stadium, Walsall, England	Croatia	1–0	3–0	UEFA Euro 2013 qualification
6	19 June 2014	Arena Lviv, Lviv, Ukraine	Ukraine	1–0	2–1	2015 FIFA Women's World Cup qualification
Great Britain goals
1	28 July 2012	Millennium Stadium, Cardiff, Wales	Cameroon		3–0	2012 Olympic Games

== Managerial statistics ==
As of 2 December 2025

Managerial record by team and tenure
Team	From	To	Record							
Team	From	To	P	W	D	L	GF	GA	GD	Win %
Manchester United Women	8 June 2018	16 May 2021	77	52	6	19	213	60	+153	67.53
San Diego Wave	14 July 2021	24 June 2024	74	28	19	27	92	80	+12	37.84
Canada Women	13 January 2025	Present	13	6	1	6	24	14	+10	46.15
Career totals			164	86	26	52	329	154	+175	52.44

== Honours ==
=== Player ===
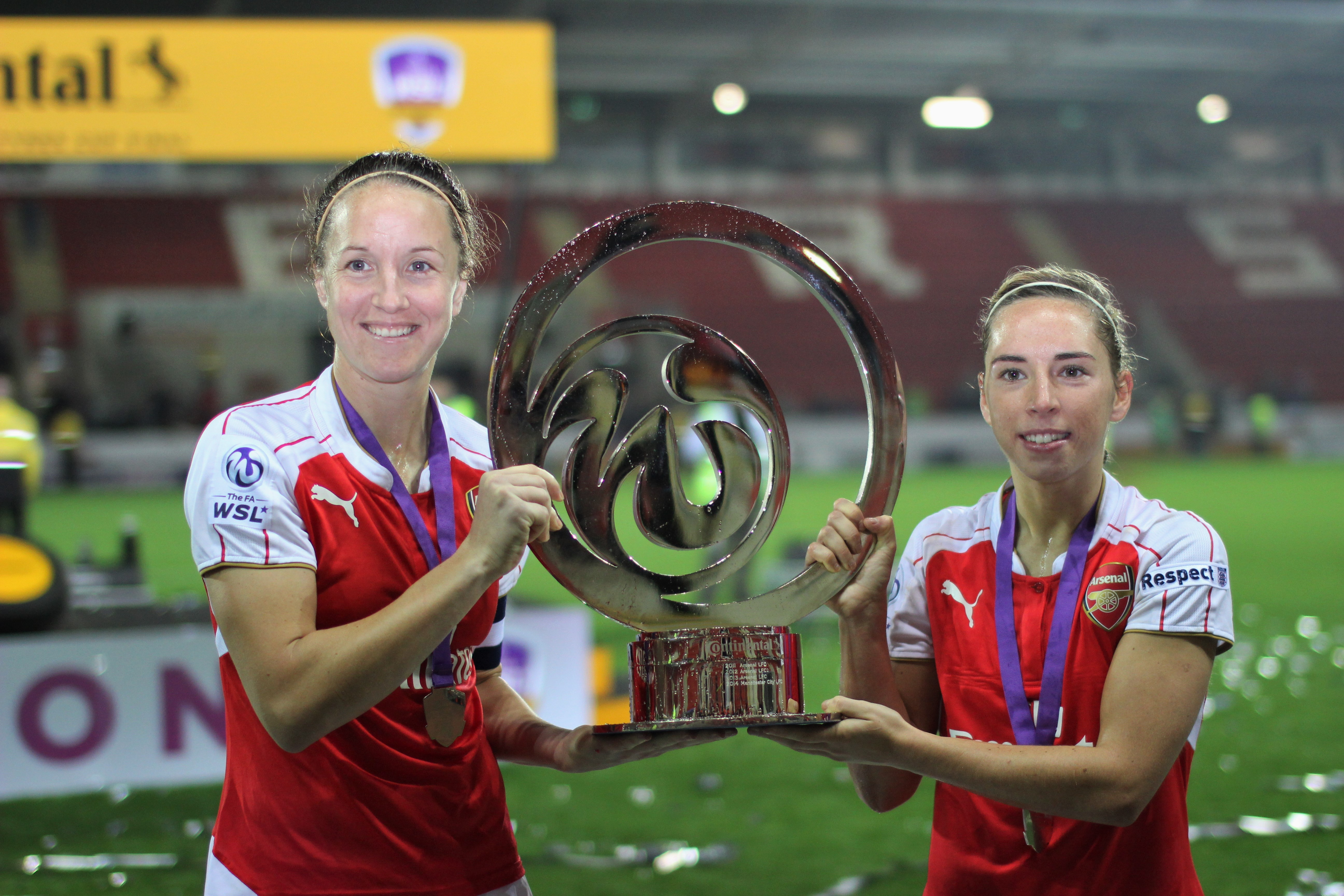
Stoney (left) with teammate Jordan Nobbs lifting the League Cup with Arsenal in 2015

Arsenal

- FA Women's Premier League National Division: 2000–01, 2001–02
- Women's FA Cup: 2001, 2014, 2016
- FA Women's League Cup: 2015
- FA Women's Premier League Cup: 1999–2000, 2000–01
- Women's FA Community Shield: 2000, 2001

Charlton Athletic

- Women's FA Cup: 2004–05
- FA Women's Premier League Cup: 2003–04, 2005–06
- Women's FA Community Shield: 2004

England

- UEFA Women's Championship runner-up: 2009
- FIFA Women's World Cup third place: 2015

Individual

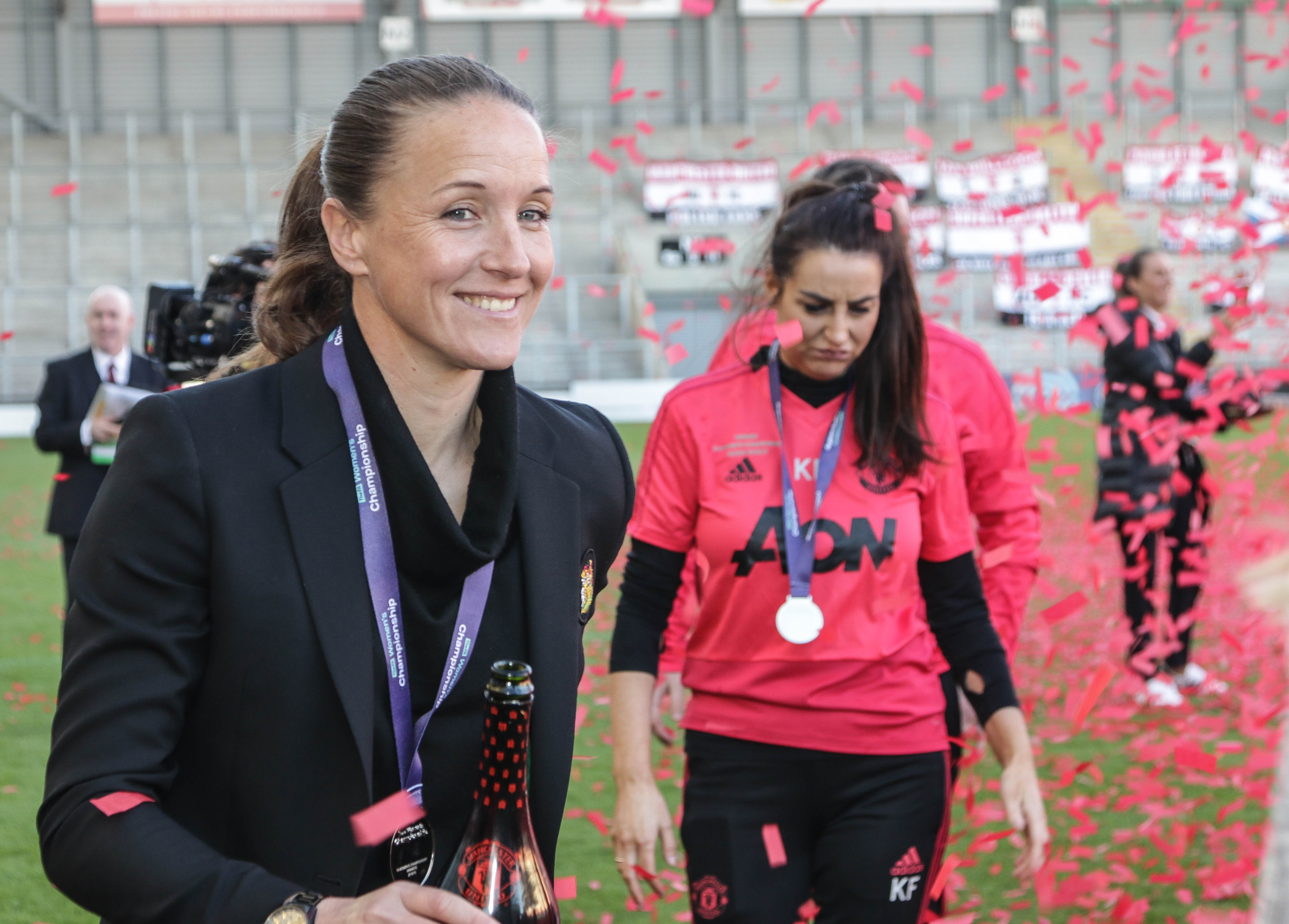
Stoney celebrating promotion with Manchester United at the end of their inaugural season

- FA International Player of the Year Award: 2008, 2012
- FA WSL Team of the Year: 2014–15, 2015–16
- WSL Hall of Fame: inducted April 2026

=== Manager ===
Manchester United

- FA Women's Championship: 2018–19

San Diego Wave

- NWSL Shield: 2023
- NWSL Challenge Cup: 2024

Canada

- Pinatar Cup: 2025

Individual

- LMA Women's Championship Manager of the Month: November 2018, February 2019, April 2019
- Women's Super League Manager of the Month: November 2020, December 2020
- NWSL Coach of the Year: 2022
