= Courtney Brown (soccer) =

American soccer player (born 2000)

- Brown with the Utah Royals in 2026

Personal information
- Full name: Courtney Talbot Brown
- Birth name: Courtney Talbot
- Date of birth: November 25, 2000 (age 25)
- Height: 5 ft 4 in (1.63 m)
- Position: Midfielder

Team information
- Current team: Utah Royals
- Number: 16

College career
Years	Team	Apps	(Gls)
2019–2023	Utah Utes	94	(14)

Senior career*
Years	Team	Apps	(Gls)
2024–2025	Washington Spirit	39	(2)
2026–	Utah Royals	16	(1)
- * Club domestic league appearances and goals as of 04:19, November 10, 2026 (UTC)

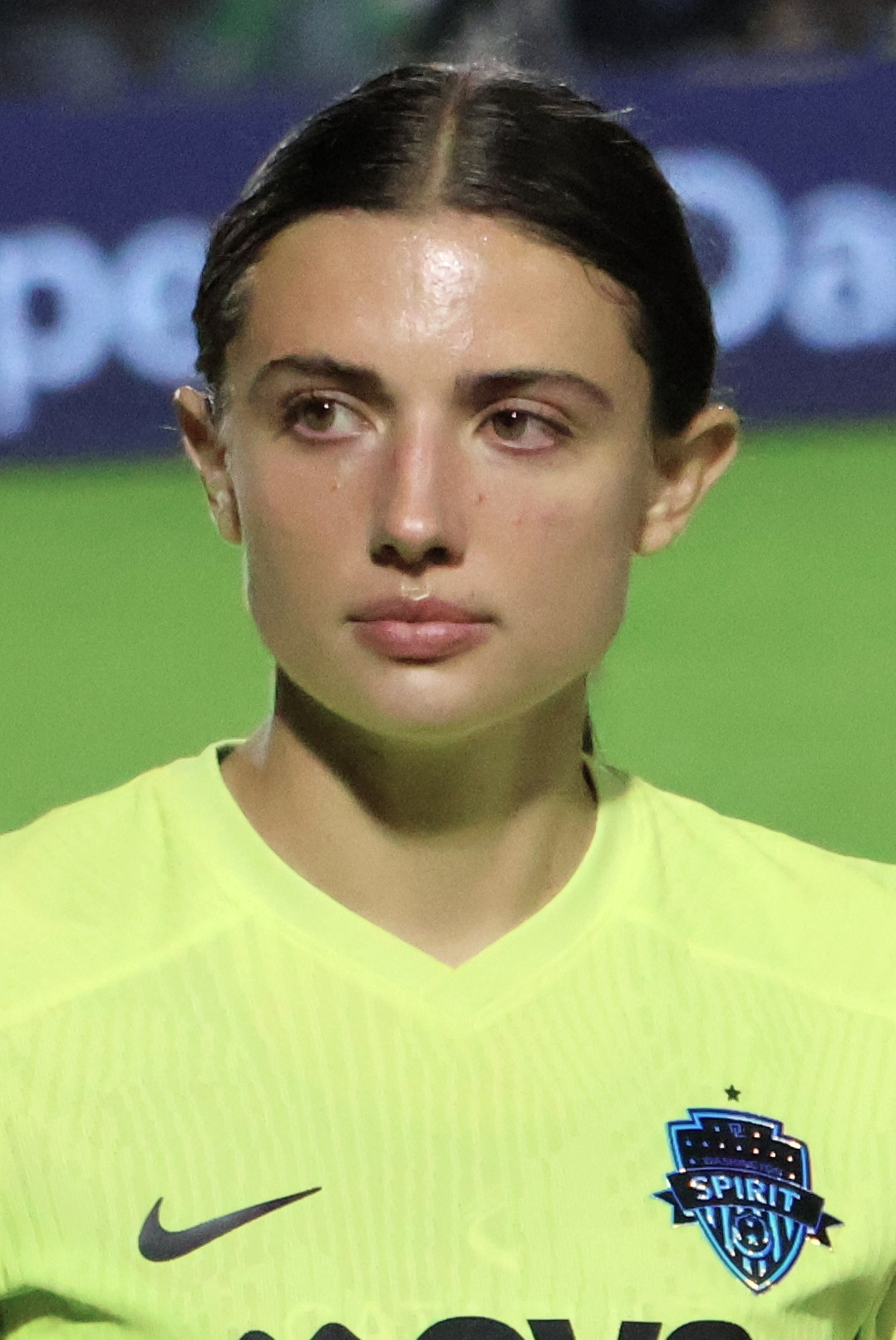
Brown with the Washington Spirit in 2024

Courtney Talbot Brown (née Talbot; born November 25, 2000) is an American professional soccer player who plays as a midfielder for the Utah Royals of the National Women's Soccer League (NWSL). She played college soccer for the Utah Utes and was selected by the Washington Spirit in the fourth round of the 2024 NWSL Draft.

== Early life ==
Brown grew up in West Haven, Utah, and attended Fremont High School in Plain City, Utah. She lettered in soccer, basketball, and track in high school, before deciding to focus on soccer. She helped the soccer team reach the Class 5A state championship game as a sophomore in 2016, scoring a goal in the loss at Rio Tinto Stadium. Growing up, she attended several Brigham Young University (BYU) soccer camps that were taught partly by her future Washington Spirit teammate Ashley Hatch. After two seasons of high school soccer, she played only for her club team La Roca FC. She initially planned to attend BYU before changing her mind and choosing to play for Utah.

== College career ==
Brown was an immediate starter for the Utah Utes as a freshman in 2019, playing in all 21 games with 17 starts and scoring 2 goals. That year, she helped Utah qualify for the NCAA tournament, but it turned out to be her only tournament appearance in five years in Salt Lake City. She started all 16 games as a sophomore in 2020, leading the team in minutes played and points with 1 goal and a career-high 6 assists. In her junior year in 2021, she started all 20 games and led the team with a career-high 5 goals. She was also made team captain beginning that season. She had 3 goals and 3 assists in 17 games in her senior year in 2022. Because of the COVID-19 pandemic, she was granted an extra year of eligibility and returned for a fifth season while completing her master's degree in accounting. She started all 20 games and scored 3 goals with 4 assists in 2023.

== Club career ==
=== Washington Spirit ===
Brown was drafted by the Washington Spirit with the 49th overall pick in the fourth round of the 2024 NWSL Draft. She was signed to three-year contract. She made her professional debut as a 65th-minute substitute for Ashley Hatch in a season-opening 1–0 loss to the Seattle Reign on March 17, 2025. Later that month, she made her professional start and played the entire match in a 2–1 victory over the Utah Royals. On June 23, she scored her first professional goal, with an assist from fellow rookie Croix Bethune, in a 2–0 win against NJ/NY Gotham FC. She played in 24 regular-season games as a rookie, starting 10, and scored 1 goal as the Spirit placed second in the league. In the playoff quarterfinals, she was replaced by Leicy Santos at halftime in an eventual 2–1 win over Bay FC, then was an unused substitute for the rest of the playoffs as the Spirit reached the 2024 NWSL Championship, losing to the Orlando Pride.

After missing the Spirit's victory in the 2025 NWSL Challenge Cup through injury, Brown made her season debut with a start in a 2–0 win over Racing Louisville on April 12, 2025. She played in 15 league games, starting 5, and scored 1 goal in 2025, as the Spirit again finished second in the league. She was an unused substitute in the playoffs as the Spirit reached the 2025 NWSL Championship, losing again this time to Gotham FC. She mutually agreed to end her contract after the season.

=== Utah Royals ===
On December 31, 2025, the Utah Royals announced that they had signed Brown to a one-year contract.

== Personal life ==
Brown is the daughter of Brett and Meechelle Talbot and has three siblings. She married Camen Brown on May 7, 2022.

== Honors ==
Washington Spirit

- NWSL Challenge Cup: 2025
