= DeAira Jackson =

American soccer player (born 2002)

- Jackson with the Utah Royals in 2026

Personal information
- Date of birth: March 23, 2002 (age 24)
- Height: 6 ft 1 in (1.85 m)
- Position: Goalkeeper

Team information
- Current team: Utah Royals
- Number: 77

College career
Years	Team	Apps	(Gls)
2021–2022	Cal State Fullerton Titans	16	(0)
2023–2024	Grand Canyon Antelopes	43	(0)

Senior career*
Years	Team	Apps	(Gls)
2025	Orlando Pride	0	(0)
2025–	Utah Royals	0	(0)
- * Club domestic league appearances and goals

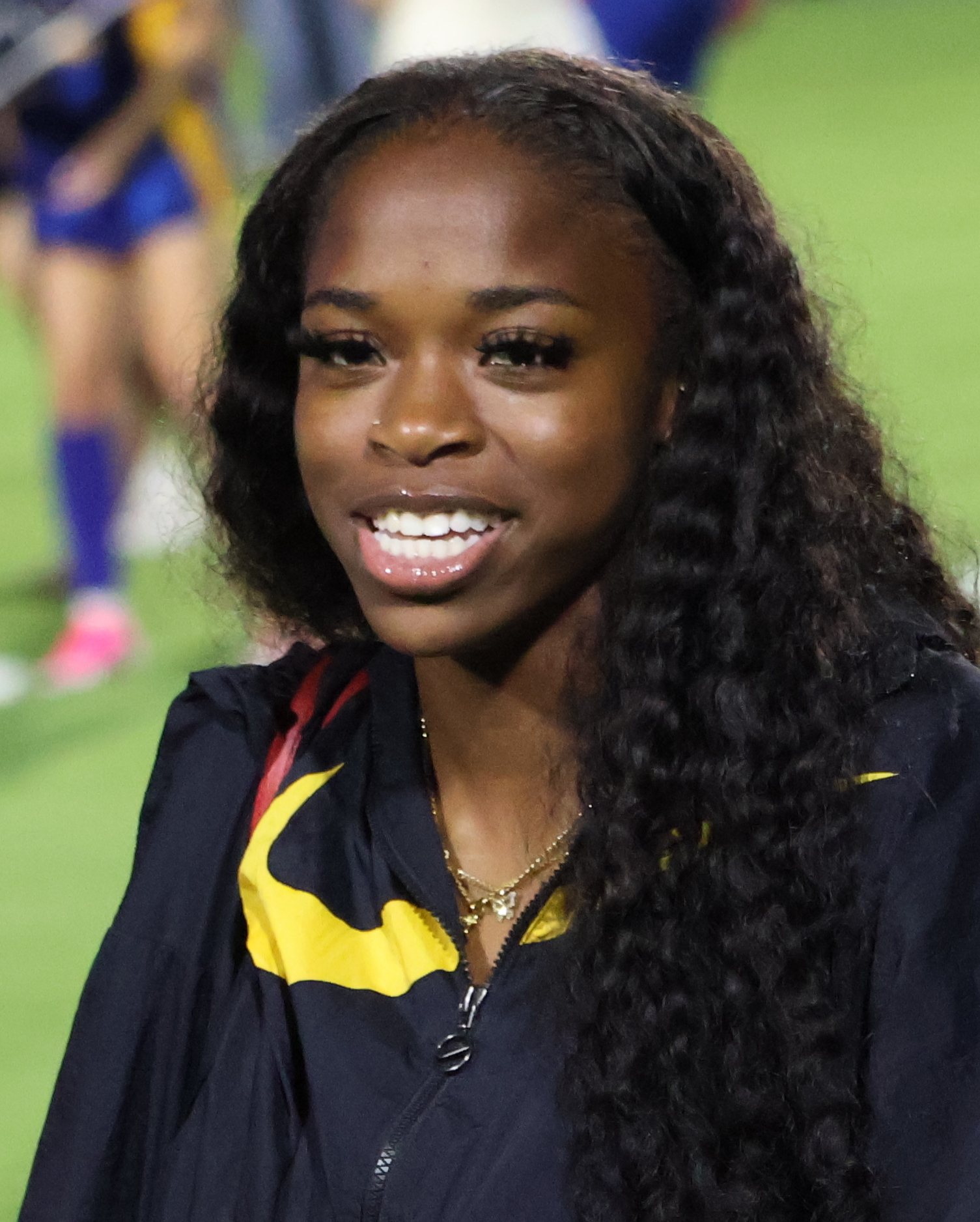
Jackson with the Utah Royals in 2026

DeAira "DJ" Jackson (born March 23, 2002) is an American professional soccer player who plays as a goalkeeper for the Utah Royals of the National Women's Soccer League (NWSL). She played college soccer for the Cal State Fullerton Titans and the Grand Canyon Antelopes.

== Early life ==
Jackson grew up in Fontana, California, one of two daughters born to James Jackson and Regena Weatherford. She attended Rancho Cucamonga High School, where she played soccer, track and field as a hurdler, and football as a kicker for one season.

== College career ==
Jackson enrolled in California State University, Fullerton, in 2020 after graduating high school early, but her first season was cancelled due to the COVID-19 pandemic. She went on to play in 16 games, starting 10 of them, over the next two seasons with the Fullerton Titans. She was named to the Big West Conference all-freshman team in 2021. She also began training in rugby sevens after winning Next Olympic Hopeful, a TV show organized by the United States Olympic & Paralympic Committee.

Jackson then transferred to Grand Canyon University in Phoenix, Arizona, in 2023, becoming the primary keeper for the Antelopes soccer team. In her debut season, she started all 23 games and kept 7 clean sheets (plus 3 combined shutouts), earning second-team All-Western Athletic Conference honors. She helped them win the WAC tournament and was named to the all-tournament team. She made 5 saves in a 1–0 defeat to USC in the NCAA tournament, allowing only a goal from the penalty spot. In her senior season in 2024, she started all 20 games and kept 9 clean sheets, being named first-team All-WAC and the WAC Goalkeeper of the Year.

== Club career ==
Jackson joined the Orlando Pride as a non-roster trialist during the 2025 preseason. On February 12, the Pride announced the signing of Jackson on a short-term contract that lasted two and a half months.

On July 11, 2025, the Utah Royals announced that the club had signed Jackson for the remainder of the season, becoming the third-string goalkeeper behind Mandy McGlynn and Mia Justus. On December 10, she renewed with the Royals on a one-year salary cap exempt deal.

== Honors and awards ==
Grand Canyon Antelopes

- WAC tournament: 2023

Individual

- WAC Goalkeeper of the Year: 2024
- First-team All-WAC: 2024
- Second-team All-WAC: 2023
- Big West all-freshman team: 2021
