= Kameron Simmonds =

Jamaican footballer (born 2003)

- Simmonds with the Utah Royals in 2026

Personal information
- Full name: Kameron Necole Simmonds
- Date of birth: 6 December 2003 (age 22)
- Place of birth: Midlothian, Virginia, U.S.
- Height: 1.70 m (5 ft 7 in)
- Positions: Forward; defender

Team information
- Current team: Utah Royals
- Number: 6

Youth career
- Richmond United

College career
Years	Team	Apps	(Gls)
2022–2023	Tennessee Volunteers	34	(12)
2024–2025	Florida State Seminoles	42	(6)

Senior career*
Years	Team	Apps	(Gls)
2024	Richmond Ivy	6	(1)
2026–	Utah Royals	7	(0)

International career^{‡}
2022	Jamaica U20	4	(2)
2022–	Jamaica	11	(1)
- * Club domestic league appearances and goals as of 04:25, 10 November 2026 (UTC) ‡ National team caps and goals as of 08:33, 3 March 2026 (UTC+1)

Kameron Necole Simmonds (born 6 December 2003) is a professional footballer who plays as a forward or defender for the Utah Royals of the National Women's Soccer League (NWSL). Born in the United States, she plays for the Jamaica national team. She played college soccer for the Tennessee Volunteers and the Florida State Seminoles, winning the 2025 national championship with the Seminoles.

== Early life ==
Kameron Necole Simmonds was born on 6 December 2003 in Virginia to Necole and Greg Simmonds. She has three younger brothers, including the footballer Nicholas Simmonds. Despite her father being a former footballer, Simmonds only took up the sport when she was unable to continue training in gymnastics after an injury at the age of 11; beginning football the next year, she trained with her father.

== College career ==
Simmonds played for Richmond United until the summer of 2022 when she began her college soccer career at the University of Tennessee for the Tennessee Volunteers. She chose to join Tennessee due to her parents believing in its values; due to encouragement from Jamaica teammate Giselle Washington, who already attended the university; and being inspired by Jamaica legend and former Volunteer Khadija Shaw.

As a true freshman, she made two top 100 best freshman lists, having scored four goals in sixteen appearances. Playing as a substitute, the college highlighted her productivity in her limited minutes, often with multiple shots on goal per game.

== Club career ==
In February 2024, Simmonds joined Richmond Ivy ahead of their inaugural USL W League season.

Simmons joined the NWSL's Utah Royals as a non-roster invitee in the 2026 preseason. On 5 February 2026, the Royals announced that they had signed Simmonds to her first professional contract, a two-year deal.

== International career ==
In the under-20 national team, Simmonds competed at the 2022 CONCACAF Women's U-20 Championship with the Jamaican U-20 team. She scored two goals at the tournament, watched by her family.

When she made her senior debut on 3 September 2022, in a 0–1 friendly loss to South Korea, she became the third generation of her family to represent Jamaica in senior international football after her father, Greg, and grandfather, Patrick.

Simmonds then competed at the 2023 Cup of Nations, where her team finished in fourth place. On 23 June 2023, she was included in the final Jamaica squad for the 2023 FIFA Women's World Cup. She made her World Cup debut in the second group game, coming on for Kayla McKenna in a 1–0 victory over Panama.

== Honors ==
Florida State Seminoles

- NCAA Division I women's soccer tournament: 2025
- ACC women's soccer tournament: 2024
