= Utah Royals =

American women's professional soccer team

- Founded: November 16, 2017; 9 years ago
- Stadium: America First Field; Sandy, Utah
- Capacity: 20,213
- Owners: Miller Sports + Entertainment (Gail Miller) (majority); David Blitzer (minority)
- President: John Kimball (interim)
- Head coach: Jimmy Coenraets
- League: National Women's Soccer League
- 2025: Regular season: 12th of 14; Playoffs: DNQ
- Website: rsl.com/utahroyals
Home colors	Away colors	Third colors

The Utah Royals (formerly Utah Royals FC) are an American professional soccer team based in the Salt Lake City metropolitan area that competes in the National Women's Soccer League (NWSL). Established on November 16, 2017, as an expansion team, the Royals played their first stint in the NWSL from 2018 until ceasing operations in 2020, with their player-related assets transferred to the expansion Kansas City Current. In 2023, then Real Salt Lake owners Ryan Smith and David Blitzer reestablished the team.

== History ==
=== Establishment ===
Utah Royals in 2026

On November 16, 2017, Real Salt Lake of Major League Soccer announced that it had acquired a franchise in the National Women's Soccer League. On November 20, 2017, the league announced that FC Kansas City of the National Women's Soccer League would fold their club, and the team's player contracts, draft picks, and other rights would be transferred to the new Salt Lake City club. As of August 2017, Utah's six NCAA Division I women's soccer teams outnumbered the men's, a seventh women's soccer school moved from Division II to Division I in 2020, and the state has the highest rate of girls' high school soccer players recruited by Division I colleges. Attendance at Division I women's soccer games in Utah is among the highest in the NCAA. The decision to bring an NWSL team to Utah was based on the established interest in men's soccer in the state as well as Dell Loy Hansen's gut feeling and longtime interest in a team.

The new Salt Lake City team announced its hiring of former Seattle Reign FC coach Laura Harvey as its inaugural head coach on November 27, 2017.

=== Inaugural season ===
Gunnhildur Yrsa Jónsdóttir scored the first goal in franchise history on March 24, 2018, in the third minute of the club's inaugural match against Orlando Pride in Orlando. 18,500 tickets were sold ahead of their first home match (with only club seats and standing-only tickets remaining). Official attendance the day of the match, in which they played the Chicago Red Stars, was reported as 19,023.

=== Dissolution ===
In August 2020, Dell Loy Hansen announced plans to sell Utah Soccer LLC—the parent company of the Royals, Real Salt Lake, and Real Monarchs—following allegations of racist and sexist behavior by staff. Utah Royals FC were officially dissolved on December 7, 2020. The club's parent company, Utah Soccer LLC, sold the team's NWSL player contracts and franchise rights to Chris and Angie Long and Brittany Mahomes, who founded a new team provisionally named Kansas City NWSL and later renamed Kansas City Current.

The sale of the Royals included a provision that any entity that purchased Real Salt Lake would be granted the option to launch an expansion team using the Utah Royals FC identity no sooner than the 2023 National Women's Soccer League season.

=== Return ===
On March 11, 2023, Ryan Smith and David Blitzer, whose companies had jointly purchased ownership of Real Salt Lake, announced that they would exercise their option to launch an NWSL team alongside investment from a group known as 42 Futbol Group composed of Jessica Gelman, Daryl Morey, and Amy Reinhard. The new expansion team would begin play in the 2024 National Women's Soccer League season, joining alongside fellow expansion team Bay FC in San Jose, California. The agreement reportedly allowed the Royals to enter the league at a considerably lower expansion fee of $2–$5 million, compared to around $50 million for Bay FC.

The new ownership group named Michelle Hyncik as club president. Hyncik hired former Utah Royals FC and United States women's national soccer team forward Amy Rodriguez, then serving as an assistant coach for the USC Trojans women's soccer team, as the team's inaugural head coach. Hyncik and Rodriguez had been teammates in high school. On April 18, 2025, Miller Sports + Entertainment, led by former Utah Jazz owner Gail Miller, acquired controlling interest in the franchise as part of a $600 million deal that included Real Salt Lake, with Blitzer remaining as a minority owner.

In 2026, the Royals advanced to the playoffs for the first time.

== Branding ==
Historical badges

2018–20 (primary)

The team was officially launched on December 1, 2017, with the announcements of its name, branding, season tickets, and social media.

The badge features a gold lioness head and “Claret Red”, “Cobalt Blue” and “Victory Gold” colors. Two stylized balls, which represent the team's connection to the MLS and United Soccer League, surround the name “UTAH ROYALS FC” in the lower half of the badge.

=== Sponsorship ===
In February 2018, the Royals announced a three-year multimillion-dollar deal with Conservice, a utility company based in Logan, Utah. The company's logo was featured on the front of the team's jerseys.

Utah announced a multi-year partnership deal with Young Living Essential Oils on April 2, 2019. The Young Living partnership included an original video series called ‘Rise up to Royalty’ which profiled URFC players personal lives. This 12-episode series ran throughout the course of the 2019 season.

America First Credit Union was one of the Royals' first sponsors. Upon the club's return to the NWSL, the credit union was announced as the front of jersey sponsor. This caused controversy due to the history of the term America First. The Royals issued a lengthy joint statement with the credit union which stood firm on the partnership.

== Stadium ==
Utah Royals play at America First Field (known before September 2022 as Rio Tinto Stadium), located 15 minutes from downtown Salt Lake City in Sandy, Utah, the same as the men's team Real Salt Lake does.

America First Field is a soccer-specific stadium which opened on October 9, 2008. The pitch features Kentucky Bluegrass and is 120 × 75 yards. The stadiums seats 20,213 for soccer matches.

== Players and staff ==
=== Current squad ===
As of September 13, 2026

No.	Pos.	Nation	Player
1	GK	USA	Mandy McGlynn
2	DF	USA	Tatumn Milazzo
3	FW	USA	Jameese Joseph
4	FW	USA	Paige Cronin (Captain)
5	FW	USA	Cece Delzer
6	FW	JAM	Kameron Simmonds
8	DF	USA	Kate Del Fava
10	MF	JPN	Narumi Miura
11	FW	JPN	Mina Tanaka
12	MF	USA	Alex Loera
13	FW	USA	Brecken Mozingo
14	DF	ESP	Nuria Rábano
15	MF	HAI	Dayana Pierre-Louis
16	MF	USA	Courtney Brown
17	MF	ESP	Ana Tejada
18	DF	USA	Kaleigh Riehl
19	FW	USA	KK Ream
21	FW	MEX	Kiana Palacios
22	DF	JPN	Miyabi Moriya
23	GK	USA	Mia Justus
24	FW	CAN	Cloé Lacasse
30	FW	USA	Alexa Spaanstra
71	DF	USA	Ali Swensen
77	GK	USA	DeAira Jackson
99	MF	USA	Madison Hammond

==== Out on loan ====
No.	Pos.	Nation	Player
20	MF	USA	Aria Nagai (on loan to Dallas Trinity FC through December 31, 2026)

=== Technical staff ===
As of October 24, 2024

- Sporting director: Kelly Cousins
- Head coach: Jimmy Coenraets
- Assistant coach: Sam Lismont
- Goalkeeper coach: James White

== Records ==
=== Season-by-season ===
As of November 3, 2025

Season	NWSL									Playoffs	Top scorer	
Season	P	W	D	L	GF	GA	GD	Pts.	Pos.	Playoffs	Player	Goals
2018	24	9	8	7	22	23	-1	35	5th	Did not qualify	(United States) Katie Stengel	6
2019	24	10	4	10	25	25	0	34	6th	Did not qualify	(United States) Amy Rodriguez	9
2020	Canceled due to the COVID-19 pandemic										(United States) Tziarra King (United States) Amy Rodriguez (Note: Statistics from the 2020 NWSL Challenge Cup and the 2020 NWSL Fall Series.)	2
2024	26	7	4	15	22	40	-18	25	11th	Did not qualify	(Canada) Cloé Lacasse	4
2025	26	6	7	13	28	42	-14	25	12th	Did not qualify	(Japan) Mina Tanaka	6

=== Head coaches' records ===
As of October 24, 2024

Name	Nation	Tenure	P	W	D	L	GF	GA	Win%
Laura Harvey	(England) ENG	December 1, 2017 – January 6, 2020	47	18	12	17	45	47	38.30
Scott Parkinson (interim)	(England) ENG	January 6, 2020 – February 7, 2020	0	0	0	0	0	0	—
Craig Harrington	(England) ENG	February 7, 2020 – September 20, 2020	5	1	2	2	4	5	20.00
Amy LePeilbet (interim)	(United States) USA	September 20, 2020 – December 7, 2020	4	0	2	2	3	8	0.00
Amy Rodriguez	(United States) USA	April 20, 2023 – June 30, 2024	15	2	2	11	7	27	13.33
Jimmy Coenraets (interim)	(Belgium) BEL	June 30, 2024 – October 24, 2024	13	7	2	4	23	13	53.85
Jimmy Coenraets	(Belgium) BEL	October 24, 2024 – present	0	0	0	0	0	0	—

=== Team records ===
As of December 26, 2025. Current players in bold. Statistics are updated once a year after the conclusion of the NWSL season.

Most appearances
Player					Appearances				
#	Name	Nat.	Pos.	Royals career	NWSL	Playoffs	Cup	Other	Total
1	**Kate Del Fava**	(United States)	DF	2020, 2024–	52	0	4	5	61
2	Gunnhildur Yrsa Jónsdóttir	(Iceland)	MF	2018–2020	48	0	4	0	52
3	Amy Rodriguez	(United States)	FW	2018–2020	43	0	4	4	51
4	Dana Foederer	(Netherlands)	MF	2024–2025	47	0	0	3	50
5	**Mandy McGlynn**	(United States)	GK	2024–	48	0	0	1	49
6	Rachel Corsie	(Scotland)	DF	2018–2020	43	0	5	0	48
7	Katie Bowen	(New Zealand)	DF	2024–2025	38	0	5	4	47
7	Lo'eau LaBonta	(United States)	MF	2018–2020	38	0	5	4	47
7	Katie Stengel	(United States)	FW	2018–2019	47	0	0	0	47
10	Madison Pogarch	(United States)	DF	2024–2025	43	0	0	0	46

Top goalscorers
Player					Appearances				
#	Name	Nat.	Pos.	Royals career	NWSL	Playoffs	Cup	Other	Total
1	Amy Rodriguez	(United States)	FW	2018–2020	14	0	1	1	16
2	Christen Press	(United States)	FW	2018–2019	10	0	0	0	10
3	**Paige Monaghan**	(United States)	FW	2024–	7	0	0	1	8
3	Katie Stengel	(United States)	FW	2018–2019	8	0	0	0	8
5	**Mina Tanaka**	(Japan)	FW	2024–	7	0	0	0	7
6	Ally Sentnor	(United States)	FW	2024–2025	4	0	0	2	6
7	**Cloé Lacasse**	(Canada)	FW	2024–	5	0	0	0	5
7	**Brecken Mozingo**	(United States)	FW	2024–	3	0	0	2	5
9	Hannah Betfort	(United States)	FW	2024	2	0	0	2	4

== Broadcasting ==
The Utah Royals announced that all matches in 2018, except for their six NWSL Game of the Week appearances on Lifetime, would be broadcast locally on KMYU My Utah TV and streamed on the KSL app, as an extension of the broadcast rights agreements with Sinclair Broadcast Group and KSL with Real Salt Lake. KALL ESPN 700 would carry the majority of Royals games on local radio – as it does for Real Salt Lake and Real Monarchs. On August 17, 2018, KSL announced that Utah Royals games would no longer be broadcast on television or radio, but they would continue to be streamed on the KSL website and app.

== See also ==
- List of top-division football clubs in CONCACAF countries
- List of professional sports teams in the United States and Canada
- Real Salt Lake Women
