= Jimmy Coenraets =

Belgian football manager (born 1995)

- Coenraets with the Utah Royals in 2026

Personal information
- Date of birth: 25 March 1995 (age 31)
- Place of birth: Halle, Belgium

Team information
- Current team: Utah Royals (head coach)

Managerial career
- Years: Team
- 2020–2024: OH Leuven
- 2024–: Utah Royals

Jimmy Coenraets (born 25 March 1995) is a Belgian professional football manager who is the head coach of the Utah Royals of the National Women's Soccer League (NWSL). He was previously the manager of Belgian club OH Leuven.

== Managerial career ==
=== OH Leuven ===
Coenraets began coaching in 2016. He studied marketing and international football business at the University of Brussels and earned a UEFA A Licence. He became manager of Oud-Heverlee Leuven in 2020, when the club was bottom of the Belgian Women's Super League. He turned the club around as Leuven went 77–26–12 during his five seasons there. They finished as league runner-up to Anderlecht every year from 2020–21 to 2022–23 and were third in 2023–24, though they were top of the standings for the regular season. Coenraets was named the league's manager of the year in 2021–22.

=== Utah Royals ===
Coenraets was hired as an assistant coach to Amy Rodriguez for National Women's Soccer League club Utah Royals on 7 June 2024. He was elevated to interim head coach following Rodriguez's dismissal on 30 June, when the Royals were bottom of the NWSL. Coenraets oversaw a winning record over the rest of the year as the Royals won their group at the 2024 NWSL x Liga MX Femenil Summer Cup and rose to 10th place out of 14 in the regular season. On 24 October 2024, he was promoted to head coach through the 2027 season.
