= Ally Sentnor =

American soccer player (born 2004)

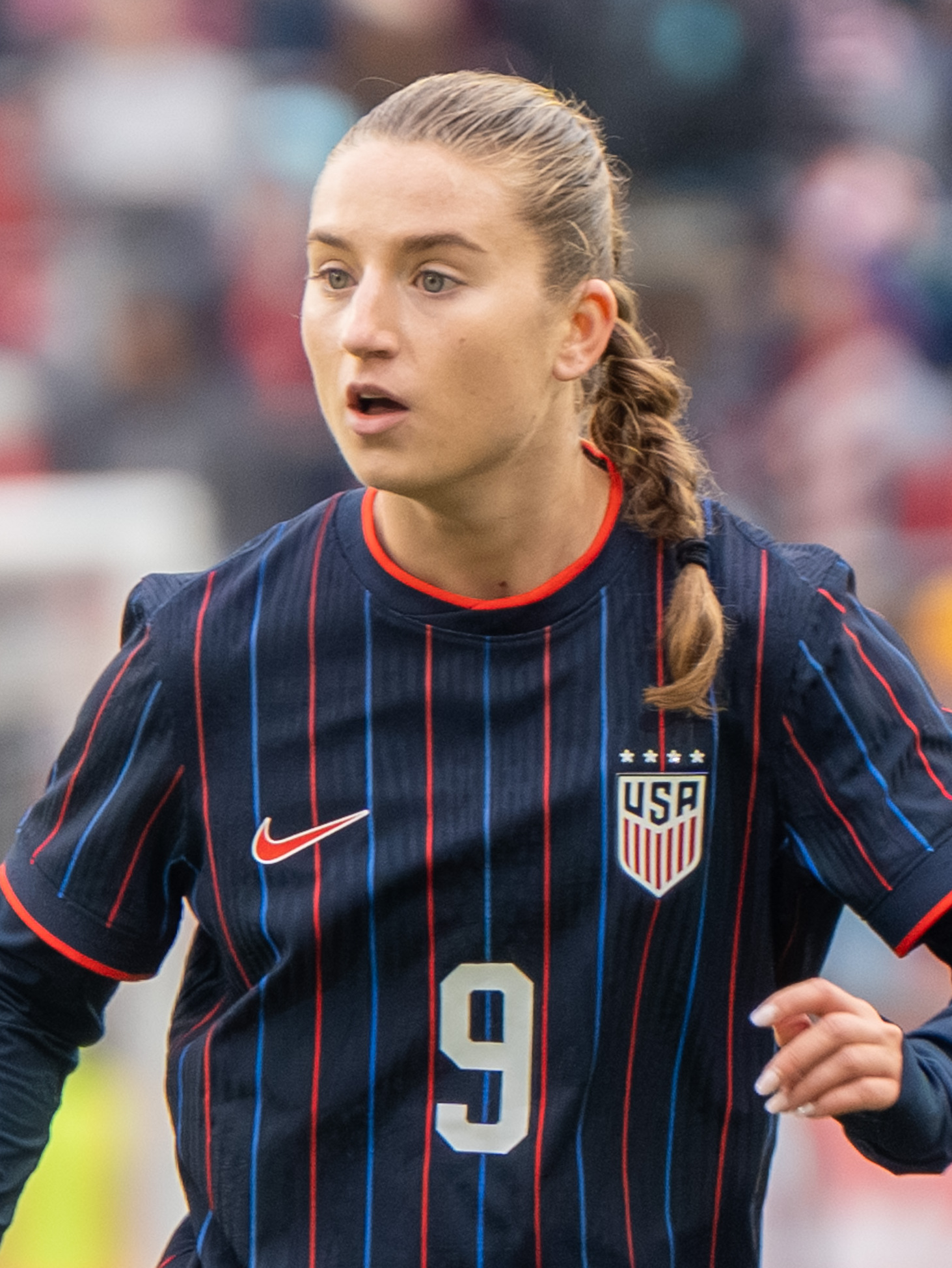
- Sentnor with the USWNT in 2026

Personal information
- Full name: Allyson Marie Sentnor
- Date of birth: February 18, 2004 (age 22)
- Place of birth: Hanson, Massachusetts, U.S.
- Height: 5 ft 3 in (1.60 m)
- Positions: Midfielder; forward

Team information
- Current team: Angel City
- Number: 17

Youth career
- 2010–2021: South Shore Select

College career
Years	Team	Apps	(Gls)
2021–2023	North Carolina Tar Heels	48	(21)

Senior career*
Years	Team	Apps	(Gls)
2024–2025	Utah Royals	34	(4)
2025–2026	Kansas City Current	23	(2)
2026–	Angel City	19	(6)

International career^{‡}
- United States U15
- United States U16
2018–2019	United States U17	4+	(3+)
2019	United States U18	2+	(2+)
2022–2024	United States U20	20	(11)
2025–	United States U23	2	(2)
2024–	United States	23	(7)
Medal record
Women's soccer
FIFA U-20 Women's World Cup
Bronze medal – third place	Colombia 2024
- * Club domestic league appearances and goals as of 06:11, November 12, 2026 (UTC) ‡ National team caps and goals as of June 9, 2026

Allyson Marie Sentnor (born February 18, 2004) is an American professional soccer player who plays as a midfielder or forward for Angel City FC of the National Women's Soccer League (NWSL) and the United States national team.

Sentnor played two seasons of college soccer for the North Carolina Tar Heels before being picked first overall by the Utah Royals in the 2024 NWSL Draft. In 2025, she was traded to the Kansas City Current in a then record intraleague transfer.

Sentnor played for the youth national team at every age level, captaining the under-20 team to bronze at the 2024 FIFA U-20 Women's World Cup. After making her senior debut the same year, she was named the U.S. Soccer Young Female Player of the Year.

== Early life ==
Raised in Hanson, Massachusetts, Sentnor began playing soccer at age four and was coached by her father on her first team. She scored so often as a kid that he would put her in goal or let her score only with her non-dominant left foot, which helped her develop equal comfort off both sides. She joined Hingham club South Shore Select at age six and later trained sometimes with the Boston Bolts boys' team. She also played the indoor soccer variant of futsal, which helped develop her touch in limited space. She attended Thayer Academy, joining the varsity soccer team in eighth grade, and reclassified to graduate one year early. In 2019, Megan Rapinoe presented 15-year-old Sentnor with the Sports Illustrated SportsKid of the Year award.

== College career ==
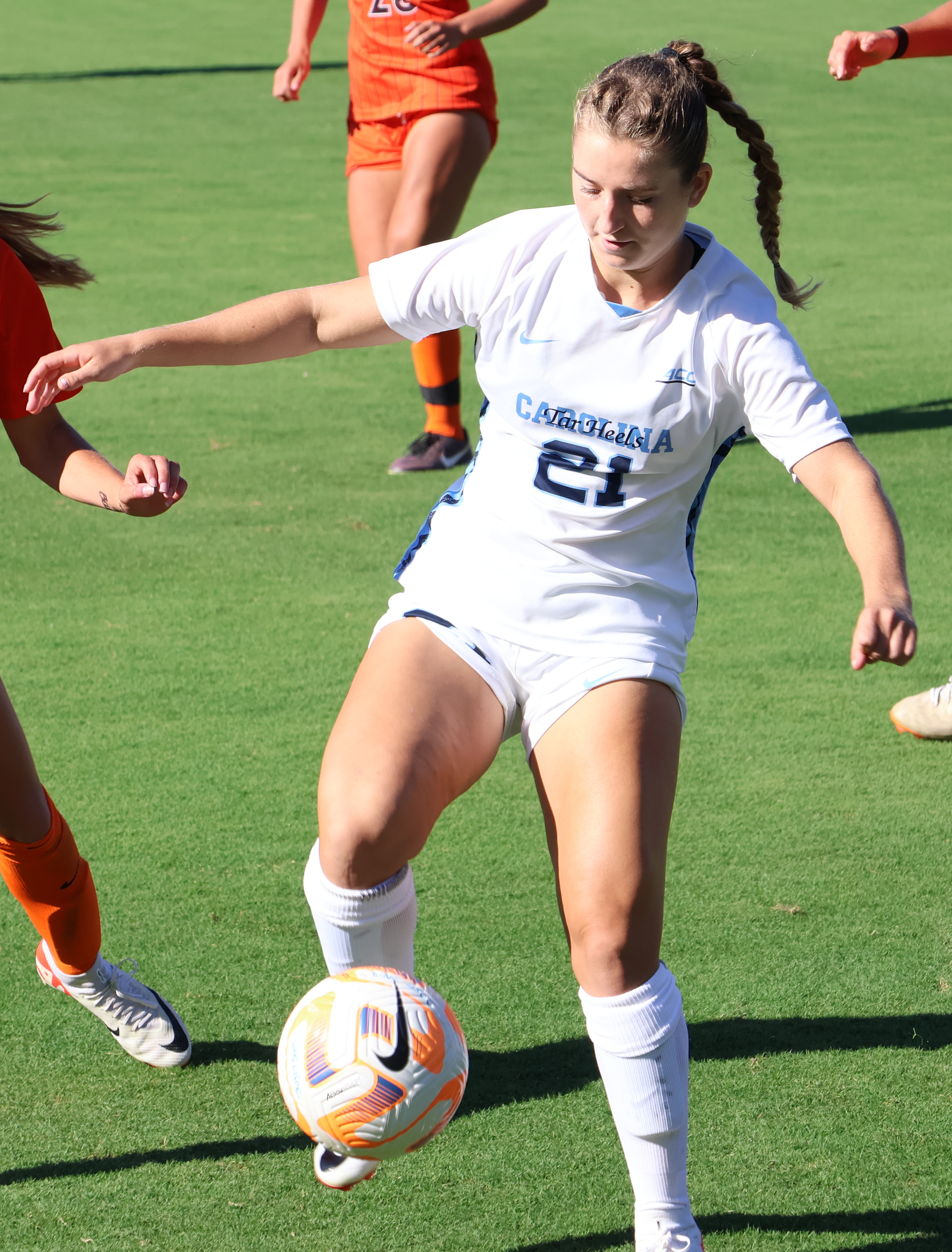
Sentnor playing for North Carolina in 2023

Sentnor tore her anterior cruciate ligament (ACL) minutes into her first preseason game for the North Carolina Tar Heels as a freshman in 2021. She made her return to the college field in 2022, scoring in her regular-season debut against Wilmington. She finished her redshirt freshman season ranked second on the team with 10 goals and added 2 assists in 25 games as North Carolina won the Atlantic Coast Conference regular-season title. Five of her goals came during the NCAA tournament as North Carolina reached the national title game, where they lost to UCLA 3–2 in overtime. She was named to the All-ACC first team and NCAA all-tournament team.

Sentnor scored a team-high 11 goals with 7 assists in 23 games as a redshirt sophomore in 2023. She recorded goal contributions in each of her last seven games for the Heels, including four goals and three assists in four games of the NCAA tournament, and was involved in all three goals in their 4–3 quarterfinal loss to BYU. She was named the ACC Midfielder of the Year, first-team All-ACC, and third-team United Soccer Coaches All-American. She chose to turn professional after the season but continued studying online to complete her degree in 2024.

== Club career ==
=== Utah Royals ===
Sentnor was selected first overall in the 2024 NWSL Draft by the Utah Royals, who were returning to the NWSL after a four-year absence; she and North Carolina teammate Savy King were the top two picks. She was signed to a three-year contract. She made her professional debut in the first game of the season, starting in a 2–0 defeat to the Chicago Red Stars on March 16. The following week, she scored her first professional goal against the North Carolina Courage, shooting from the corner of the penalty box off a long dribble, as the Royals won 2–1 at home. She was deployed as a winger at the start of the season, scoring or assisting on five of Utah's first seven goals, before moving to a more playmaking role as an attacking midfielder at the end of June.

Sentnor won both NWSL Rookie of the Month and Player of the Month in July after registering three goals and an assist in four games and leading the bottom-of-the-league Royals to top their group in the NWSL x Liga MX Femenil Summer Cup. She finished her rookie season with 5 goals and 5 assists in 23 games in all competitions. She was named her club's Offensive Player of the Year and was one of three nominees for NWSL Rookie of the Year, losing to Croix Bethune.

On April 18, 2025, Sentnor scored the second-latest game-winning goal in NWSL history, with her 90+10th-minute penalty kick securing a 1–0 win against the Chicago Stars. It was her only NWSL goal of the season and Utah's only win before the summer break.

Ally Sentnor with Angel City in 2026

=== Kansas City Current ===
On August 1, 2025, the Royals traded Sentnor to the Kansas City Current in exchange for a total fee of $600,000 in intraleague transfer funds to be paid across three seasons. It was the most expensive intraleague transfer at the time. The move also united Sentnor with her close friend Claire Hutton. She made her Current debut in an immediate return to America First Field, replacing Debinha at halftime in a 1–0 victory over the Royals. She played in 11 regular-season games as the Current clinched the NWSL Shield with the best record in the league. She made her playoff debut in the quarterfinals as the Current were upset 2–1 by eventual champions Gotham FC in extra time.

Sentnor scored her first goal for the Current in a season-opening 2–1 win over former club Utah Royals on March 14, 2026.

=== Angel City ===
On June 19, 2026, the Current traded Sentnor to Angel City FC for $850,000 in intraleague transfer funds. Sentnor debuted for Angel City on July 3, 2026, earning the start in a 2–0 win over the Orlando Pride. On Sunday August 16th, Sentnor scored her first goal for Angel City, an equalizer in the 85th minute vs the Washington Spirit.

== International career ==
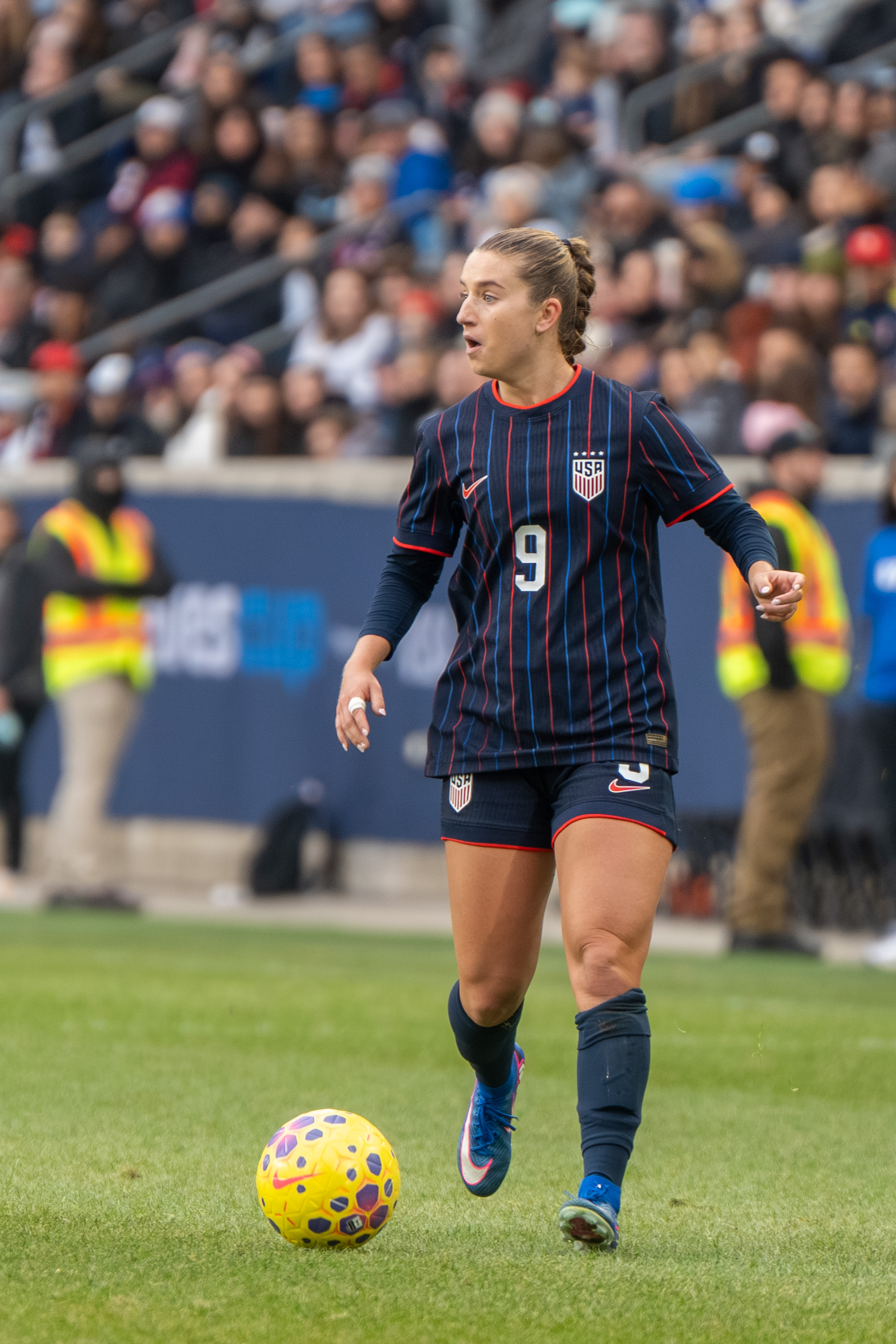
Sentnor with the USWNT in 2026

=== Youth national team ===
Sentnor was selected to the train with the United States under-14 team at the age of 12 in June 2016, the youngest player called into the camp. At age 13, she scored five goals in two friendlies for the under-15s in Germany in November 2017. She also played for the under-16s that year and was under consideration for the roster for the 2018 FIFA U-17 Women's World Cup, but ultimately not selected to join players three years above her age group. She was the most valuable player of the invitational Weifang Cup at the under-15 level in China in 2018. She was the under-17 team's leading goalscorer in 2019, also scoring two goals in two games for the under-18s against England at the start of the year. In 2020, because of the COVID-19 pandemic, her age group's CONCACAF Women's U-17 Championship and FIFA U-17 Women's World Cup were canceled.

Following her ACL recovery, Sentnor made her under-20 debut at the 2022 Sud Ladies Cup, which the United States won. She was one of the younger players selected to the roster at the 2022 FIFA U-20 Women's World Cup. She appeared in all three group stage games and scored in their opening 3–0 win against Ghana. The next year, she co-captained the under-20s with Elise Evans at the 2023 CONCACAF Women's U-20 Championship. She scored four goals during the tournament, helping the United States finish runners-up to Mexico and qualify for the 2024 FIFA U-20 Women's World Cup.

Wearing the captain's armband, Sentnor led the United States to third place at the 2024 FIFA U-20 Women's World Cup, the country's best result since 2012, scoring three goals in seven games. In the first knockout round, she scored the second goal in a 3–2 overtime win against Mexico. In the quarterfinals, trailing Germany 2–0, the United States came back in the last moments of regulation with a goal from Jordynn Dudley and an own goal forced by Sentnor in the 90+8th and 90+9th minutes; in a penalty shootout, Sentnor converted her opening kick as the United States advanced. After falling to eventual champions North Korea in the semifinals, Sentnor opened scoring in the third-place match, a 2–1 victory over the Netherlands. She was awarded the Bronze Ball as the third-most outstanding player of the tournament. Following her senior debut later that year, she was named U.S. Soccer Young Female Player of the Year for 2024.

=== Senior national team ===
Head coach Emma Hayes gave Sentnor her first senior national team call-up on November 18, 2024, ahead of international friendlies against England and the Netherlands. She made her senior debut against England at Wembley Stadium on November 30, coming on as an 88th-minute substitute for Lindsey Horan in the 0–0 draw. On February 20, 2025, she made her first senior international start and scored her first goal for the team, striking from long range to go up 2–0 against Colombia in the 2025 SheBelieves Cup. The goal was nominated for the FIFA Marta Award. With two goals and an assist, she was the sixth player to record goal contributions in all three games at one SheBelieves Cup.

== Personal life ==
Sentnor is the oldest of three children born to Richard and Lee Sentnor. She shares her hometown of Hanson, Massachusetts (population 10,000), with United States internationals Sam and Kristie Mewis, with whom she trained a few times growing up.

== Career statistics ==
=== Club ===
As of August 1, 2025

Appearances and goals by club, season and competition
Club	Season	League			Playoffs (Note: Includes NWSL playoffs)		Other		Total	
Club	Season	Division	Apps	Goals	Apps	Goals	Apps	Goals	Apps	Goals
Utah Royals	2024	NWSL	21	3	—		2 (Note: Appearances in NWSL x Liga MX Femenil Summer Cup)	2	23	5
Utah Royals	2025	NWSL	13	1	—		—		10	1
Utah Royals	Total		34	4	0	0	2	2	33	6
Kansas City Current	2025	NWSL	0	0	—		—		0	0
Career total			31	4	0	0	2	2	33	6

=== International ===
As of match played June 9, 2026

National team	Year	Apps	Goals
United States	2024	2	0
United States	2025	11	4
United States	2026	10	3
Total		23	7

=== International goals ===
Scores and results list United States's goal tally first, score column indicates score after each Sentnor goal.

Key (expand for notes on "international goals" and sorting)
Location	Geographic location of the venue where the competition occurred Sorted by country name first, then by city name
Lineup	Start – played entire match on minute (off player) – substituted on at the minute indicated, and player was substituted off at the same time off minute (on player) – substituted off at the minute indicated, and player was substituted on at the same time (c) – captain Sorted by minutes played
Goal in match	Goal of total goals by the player in the match Sorted by total goals followed by goal number
#	NumberOfGoals.goalNumber scored by the player in the match (alternate notation to Goal in match)
Min	The minute in the match the goal was scored. For list that include caps, blank indicates played in the match but did not score a goal.
Assist/pass	The ball was passed by the player, which assisted in scoring the goal. This column depends on the availability and source of this information.
penalty or pk	Goal scored on penalty-kick which was awarded due to foul by opponent. (Goals scored in penalty-shoot-out, at the end of a tied match after extra-time, are not included.)
Score	The match score after the goal was scored. Sorted by goal difference, then by goal scored by the player's team
Result	The final score. Sorted by goal difference in the match, then by goal difference in penalty-shoot-out if it is taken, followed by goal scored by the player's team in the match, then by goal scored in the penalty-shoot-out. For matches with identical final scores, match ending in extra-time without penalty-shoot-out is a tougher match, therefore precede matches that ended in regulation
aet	The score at the end of extra-time; the match was tied at the end of 90' regulation
pso	Penalty-shoot-out score shown in parentheses; the match was tied at the end of extra-time
	Green background color – exhibition or closed door international friendly match
	Yellow background color – match at an invitational tournament
	Red background color – Olympic women's football qualification match
	Light-blue background color – FIFA women's world cup qualification match
	Orange background color – Continental Games or regional tournament
	Pink background color – Olympic women's football tournament
	Blue background color – FIFA women's world cup final tournament
NOTE on background colors: Continental Games or regional tournament are sometimes also qualifier for World Cup or Olympics; information depends on the source such as the player's federation. NOTE: some keys may not apply for a particular football player

Goals	Date	Location	Opponent	Lineup	Min	Assist/pass	Score	Result	Competition
1	February 20, 2025	Houston, Texas	Colombia	off 77' (on Shaw)	60'	Tara McKeown	2–0	2–0	2025 SheBelieves Cup
2	February 26, 2025	San Diego, California	Japan	off 46' (on Shaw)	14'	Catarina Macario	1–1	1–2	2025 SheBelieves Cup
3	June 3, 2025	St. Louis, Missouri	Jamaica	off 67' (on Moultrie)	19'	Emily Fox	1–0	4–0	International Friendly
4	June 3, 2025	St. Louis, Missouri	Jamaica	off 67' (on Moultrie)	28'	Deflection	2–0	4–0	International Friendly
5	January 24, 2026	Carson, California	Paraguay	Starting	47'	Izzy Rodriguez	2–0	6–0	International Friendly
6	January 24, 2026	Carson, California	Paraguay	Starting	57'	Gisele Thompson	5–0	6–0	International Friendly
7	March 4, 2026	Columbus, Ohio	Canada	Starting	55'	Rose Lavelle	1–0	1–0	2026 SheBelieves Cup

== Honors and awards ==
North Carolina Tar Heels

- Atlantic Coast Conference: 2022

Kansas City Current

- NWSL Shield: 2025

United States U-20

- FIFA U-20 Women's World Cup bronze medal: 2024
- Sud Ladies Cup: 2022

United States

- SheBelieves Cup: 2026

Individual

- U.S. Soccer Young Female Player of the Year: 2024
- FIFA U-20 Women's World Cup Bronze Ball: 2024
- NWSL Rookie of the Month: July 2024
- NWSL Player of the Month: July 2024
- NWSL Team of the Month: July 2024
- First-team All-ACC: 2022, 2023
- Third-team All-American: 2023
- ACC Midfielder of the Year: 2023
- NCAA tournament all-tournament team: 2022
- Sports Illustrated SportsKid of the Year: 2019
