= List of first overall NWSL draft picks =

The National Women's Soccer League's first overall pick is the player who is selected first among all eligible draftees by a team during the annual National Women's Soccer League (NWSL) draft.

Two first picks have been named the NWSL Most Valuable Player: Crystal Dunn and Sophia Smith. Only one first overall pick was ever named NWSL Rookie of the Year: Naomi Girma.

Three collegiate programs have multiple players that were selected first overall: Stanford with four, North Carolina with three, and Virginia with two.

On August 22, 2024, the NWSL announced the elimination of its draft in its renegotiated collective bargaining agreement with the National Women's Soccer League Players Association. NWSL teams could pursue and sign any prospective collegiate and international players as free agents.

== Key ==
!	Denotes player who has been inducted to the National Soccer Hall of Fame
^{+}	Denotes player who won Most Valuable Player
*	Denotes player who has been selected for an Best XI or Second XI team
**Bold**	Denotes player who won Rookie of the Year

== List of first overall picks ==
Draft	Selected by	Player	Country	Position	College / high school / former club	NWSL rookie statistics			Ref.
Draft	Selected by	Player	Country	Position	College / high school / former club	Caps	Goals	Assists	Ref.
2013	Chicago Red Stars	Zakiya Bywaters	United States	Forward / Midfielder	UCLA	6	2	0	
2014	Washington Spirit	Crystal Dunn * +	United States	Forward	North Carolina	21	0	3	
2015	Houston Dash	Morgan Brian	United States	Midfielder	Virginia	10	0	3	
2016	Portland Thorns FC	Emily Sonnett *	United States	Defender	Virginia	15	0	0	
2017	Boston Breakers	Rose Lavelle *	United States	Midfielder	Wisconsin	10	2	1	
2018	Washington Spirit	Andi Sullivan	United States	Midfielder	Stanford	**23**	0	1	
2019	Chicago Red Stars	Tierna Davidson	United States	Defender	Stanford	13	1	0	
2020	Portland Thorns FC	Sophia Smith * ^{+}	United States	Forward	Stanford	21	**7**	1	
2021	Racing Louisville FC	Emily Fox *	United States	Defender	North Carolina	**23**	0	0	
2022	San Diego Wave FC	**Naomi Girma** *	United States	Defender	Stanford	19	0	0	
2023	Angel City FC	Alyssa Thompson	United States	Forward	Harvard-Westlake	20	4	2	
2024	Utah Royals	Ally Sentnor	United States	Midfielder	North Carolina	21	3	**4**	
The NWSL Draft was abolished in the 2024 collective bargaining agreement between the league and its players' association

== See also ==
- List of first overall PWHL draft picks
- List of first overall WNBA draft picks
