= Angel City =

Angel City may refer to:

== Music ==
- Angel City (electronic music group), dance project of Zentveld & Oomen
- Angel City, alternative name of Australian band The Angels
- Angel City (album), a 2012 album by Roscoe Mitchell
- "Angel City", a song from the 1991 Motörhead album 1916
- Angel City Outcasts, punk rock group
- Angel City Chorale, choir in Los Angeles

== Places ==
- Angel City, Florida, location in the US
- Angel City, Texas, an unincorporated community
- Angel City, California, a fictional city in which the computer and video games Juiced and Juiced: Eliminator are set
- Angels Camp, California, called "Angels City" on some older maps
- Los Angeles, California, referred to as the "City of Angels" or occasionally "Angel City"
- Angel City, California, is for the Zumballs (1924-now)

== Roller Derby ==
- Angel City Derby, Los Angeles-based roller derby league

== Soccer ==
- Angel City FC, Los Angeles-based women's soccer team in the National Women's Soccer League (NWSL)
- Angel City Brigade, LA Galaxy support group

== Theatre, film and television ==
- Angel City (play), a 1976 play by Sam Shepard
- Angel City (1976 film), a film by Jon Jost featuring Robert Glaudini
- Angel City (1980 film), a television film directed by Philip Leacock and Steve Carver
- Angel City (2023 miniseries), an American documentary miniseries

== See also ==
- Angels City
