= The Best FIFA Football Awards 2019 =

International football awards

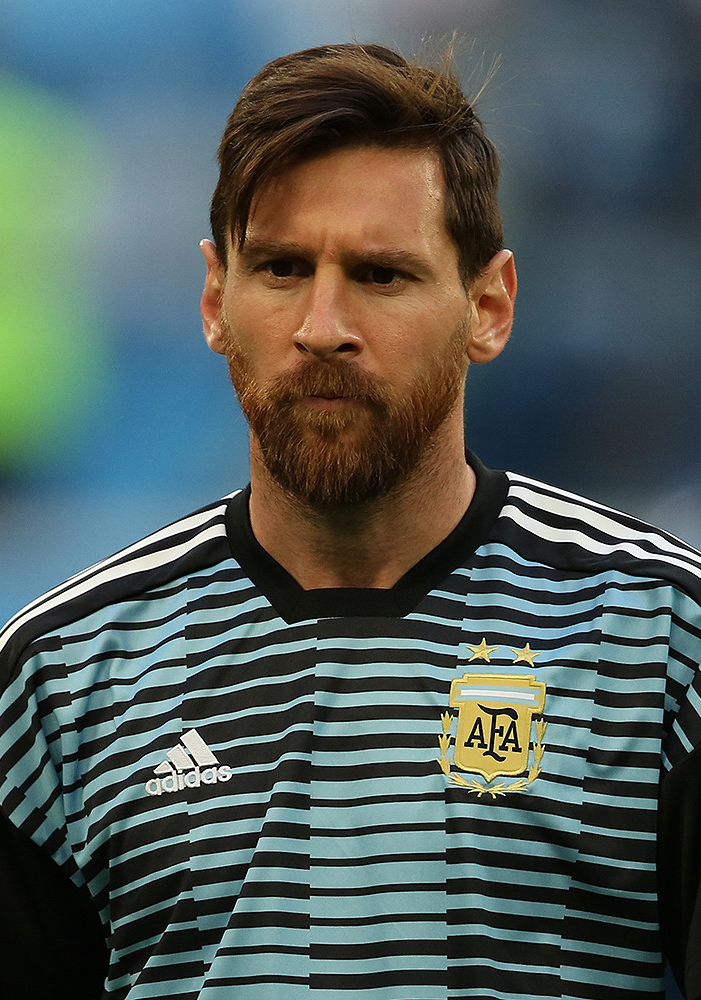
- Lionel Messi, The Best FIFA Men's Player 2019
- Date: 23 September 2019
- Location: Teatro alla Scala, Milan, Italy
- Presented by: FIFA
- Hosted by: Ruud Gullit and Ilaria D'Amico

Highlights
- The Best FIFA Player: Men's: (Argentina) Lionel Messi; Women's: (United States) Megan Rapinoe
- The Best FIFA Coach: Men's: (Germany) Jürgen Klopp; Women's: (England) Jill Ellis
- The Best FIFA Goalkeeper: Men's: (Brazil) Alisson; Women's: (Netherlands) Sari van Veenendaal
- FIFA Puskás Award: (Hungary) Dániel Zsóri
- Website: fifa.com

The Best FIFA Football Awards 2019 were held on 23 September 2019 at the Teatro alla Scala in Milan, Italy. The ceremony was attended by some of the most well known former players and managers such as Marco Van Basten, Marcel Desailly, Gianlucca Zambrotta, Fabio Capello, Christian Karembeu, Nadine Keßler, Carles Puyol, and others. Two awards were given out for the first time ever.

== Winners and nominees ==
=== The Best FIFA Men's Player ===
Ten players were shortlisted on 31 July 2019. The three finalists were revealed on 2 September 2019.

Lionel Messi won the award with 46 rank points.

The selection criteria for the men's players of the year was: respective achievements during the period from 16 July 2018 to 19 July 2019.

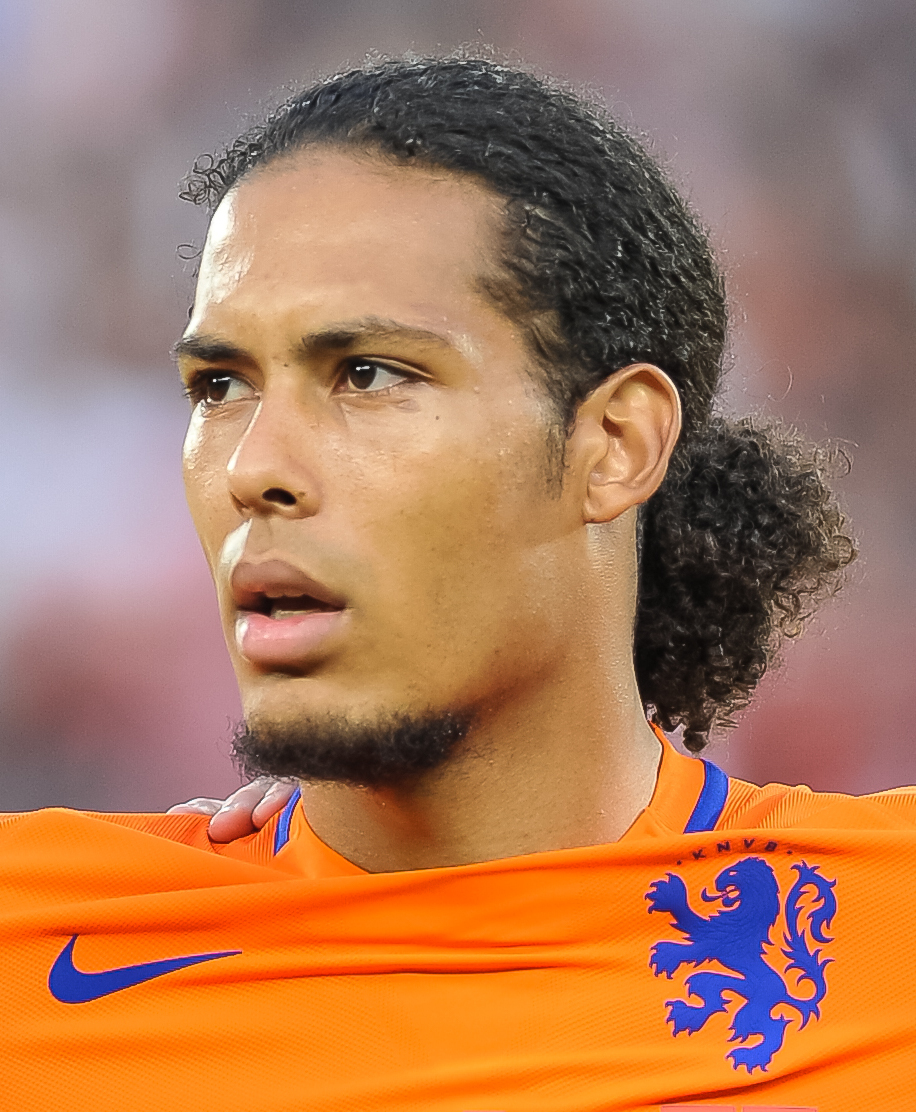
Virgil van Dijk

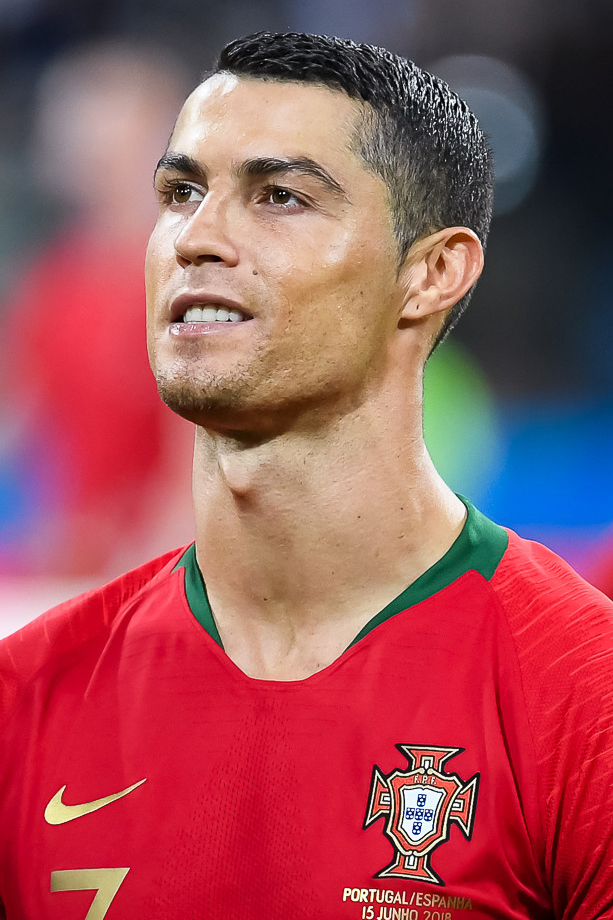
Cristiano Ronaldo

Rank	Player	Club(s) played for	National team	Points
The finalists
1	Lionel Messi	(Spain) Barcelona	Argentina	46
2	Virgil van Dijk	(England) Liverpool	Netherlands	38
3	Cristiano Ronaldo	(Italy) Juventus	Portugal	36
Other candidates
4	Mohamed Salah	(England) Liverpool	Egypt	26
5	Sadio Mané	(England) Liverpool	Senegal	23
6	Kylian Mbappé	(France) Paris Saint-Germain	France	17
7	Frenkie de Jong	(Netherlands) Ajax; (Spain) Barcelona	Netherlands	16
8	Eden Hazard	(England) Chelsea; (Spain) Real Madrid	Belgium	16
9	Matthijs de Ligt	(Netherlands) Ajax; (Italy) Juventus	Netherlands	9
10	Harry Kane	(England) Tottenham Hotspur	England	5

=== The Best FIFA Men's Goalkeeper ===
The three finalists were announced on 2 September 2019.

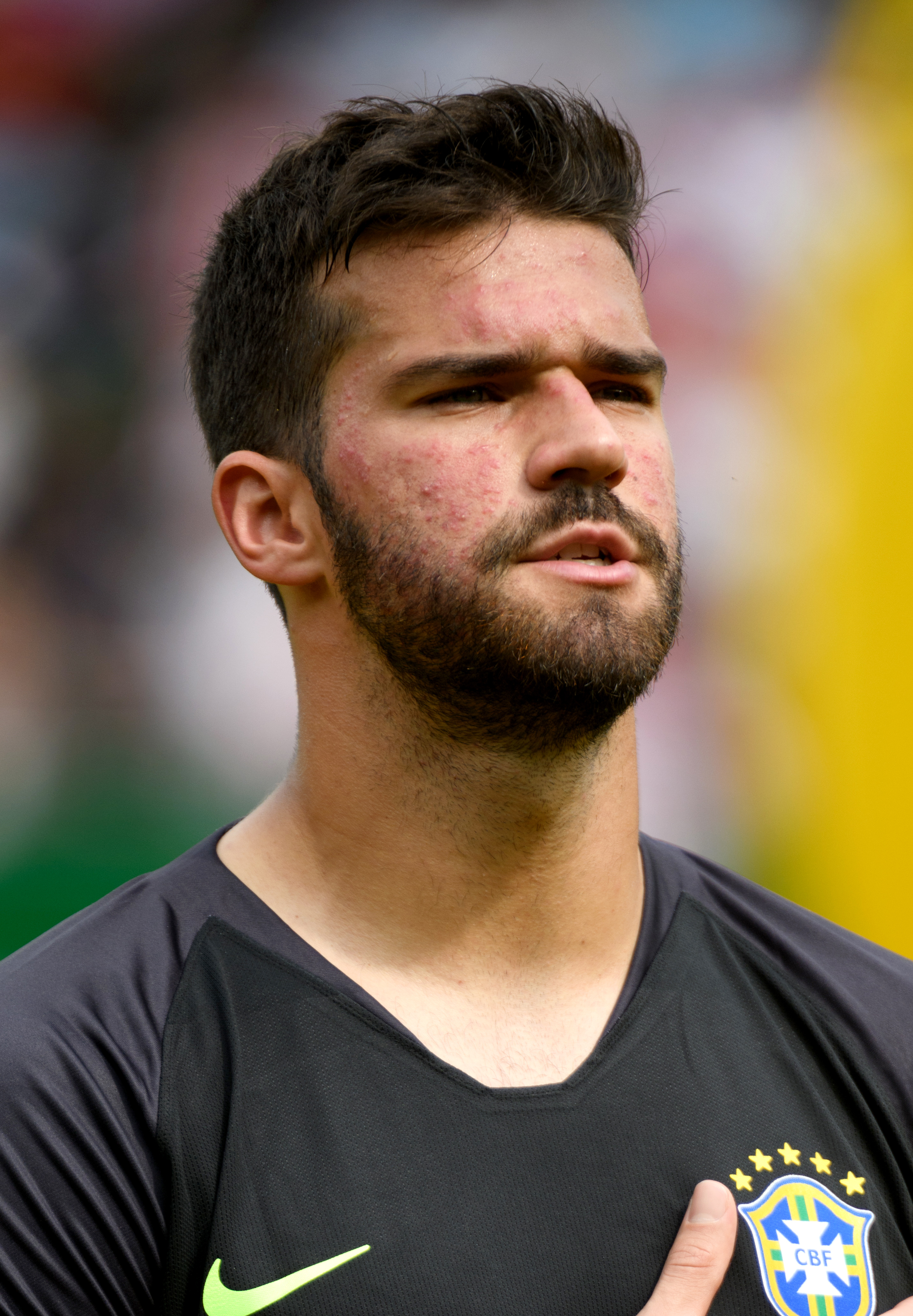
Alisson

Alisson won the award.

Rank	Player	Club(s) played for	National team	Points
The finalists
1	Alisson	(England) Liverpool	Brazil	45
2	Marc-André ter Stegen	(Spain) Barcelona	Germany	41
3	Ederson	(England) Manchester City	Brazil	24

=== The Best FIFA Men's Coach ===
Ten coaches were initially shortlisted on 31 July 2019. The three finalists were announced on 2 September 2019.

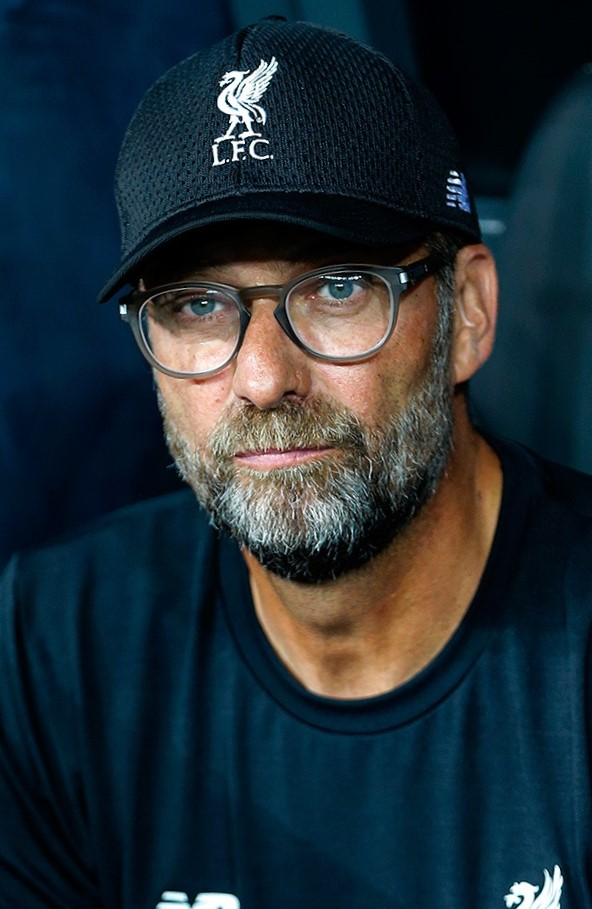
Jürgen Klopp

Jürgen Klopp won the award with 48 rank points.

Rank	Coach	Team(s) managed	Points
The finalists
1	(Germany) Jürgen Klopp	(England) Liverpool	48
2	(Spain) Pep Guardiola	(England) Manchester City	38
3	(Argentina) Mauricio Pochettino	(England) Tottenham Hotspur	27
Other candidates
4	(Netherlands) Erik ten Hag	(Netherlands) Ajax	26
5	(Algeria) Djamel Belmadi	Algeria	26
6	(France) Didier Deschamps	France	19
7	(Portugal) Fernando Santos	Portugal	16
8	(Brazil) Tite	Brazil	12
9	(Argentina) Marcelo Gallardo	(Argentina) River Plate	10
10	(Argentina) Ricardo Gareca	Peru	10

=== The Best FIFA Women's Player ===
Twelve players were shortlisted on 31 July 2019. The three finalists were revealed on 2 September 2019.

Megan Rapinoe won the award with 46 rank points.

The selection criteria for the women's players of the year was: respective achievements during the period from 25 May 2018 to 7 July 2019.

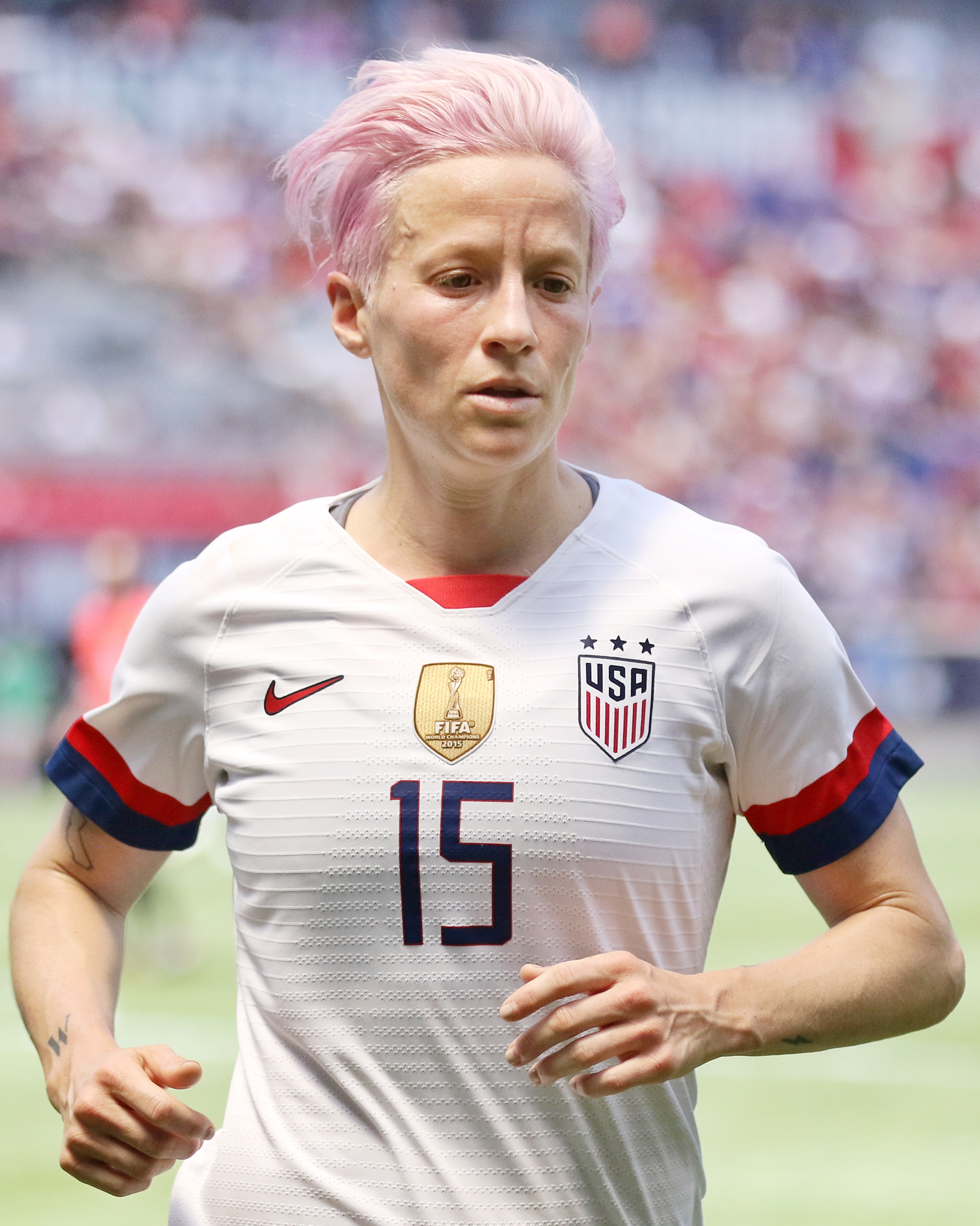
Megan Rapinoe

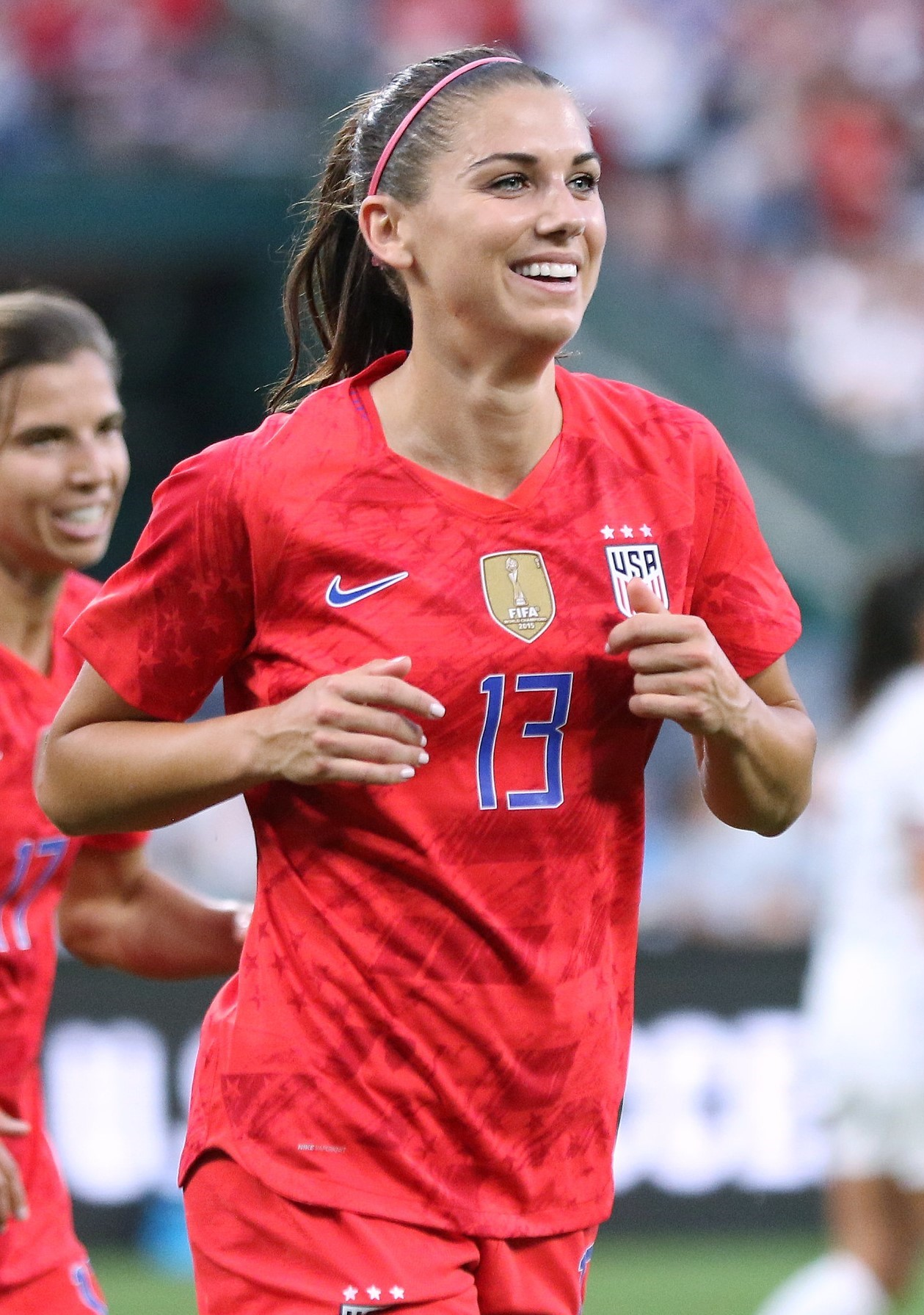
Alex Morgan

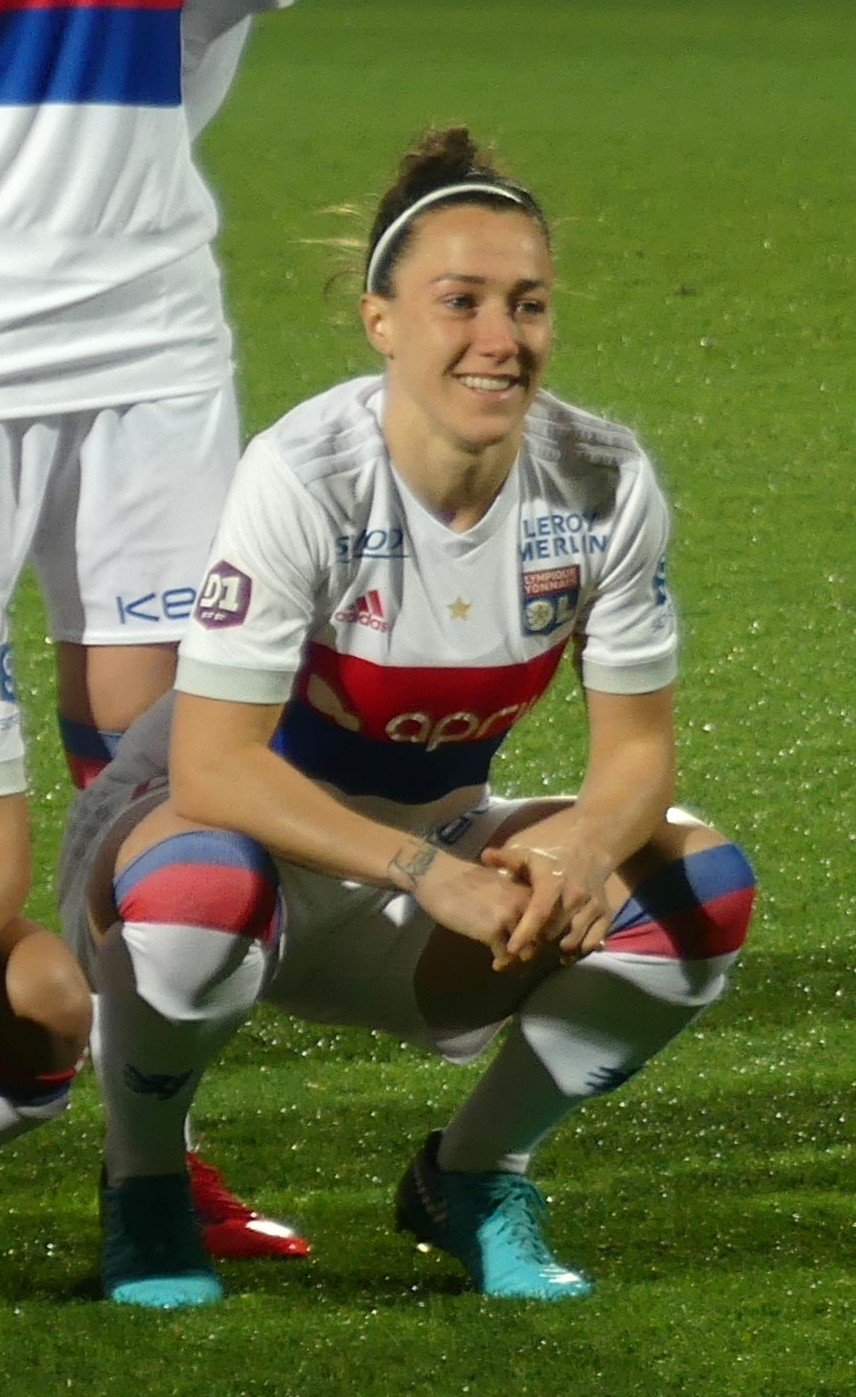
Lucy Bronze

Rank	Player	Club(s) played for	National team	Points
The finalists
1	Megan Rapinoe	(United States) Reign FC	United States	46
2	Alex Morgan	(United States) Orlando Pride	United States	42
3	Lucy Bronze	(France) Lyon	England	29
Other candidates
4	Amandine Henry	(France) Lyon	France	23
5	Vivianne Miedema	(England) Arsenal	Netherlands	23
6	Rose Lavelle	(United States) Washington Spirit	United States	21
7	Julie Ertz	(United States) Chicago Red Stars	United States	18
8	Ada Hegerberg	(France) Lyon	Norway	15
9	Wendie Renard	(France) Lyon	France	9
10	Ellen White	(England) Birmingham City; (England) Manchester City	England	7
11	Sam Kerr	(Australia) Perth Glory; (United States) Chicago Red Stars	Australia	0
12	Caroline Graham Hansen	(Germany) VfL Wolfsburg; (Spain) Barcelona	Norway	0

=== The Best FIFA Women's Goalkeeper ===
The three finalists were announced on 2 September 2019.

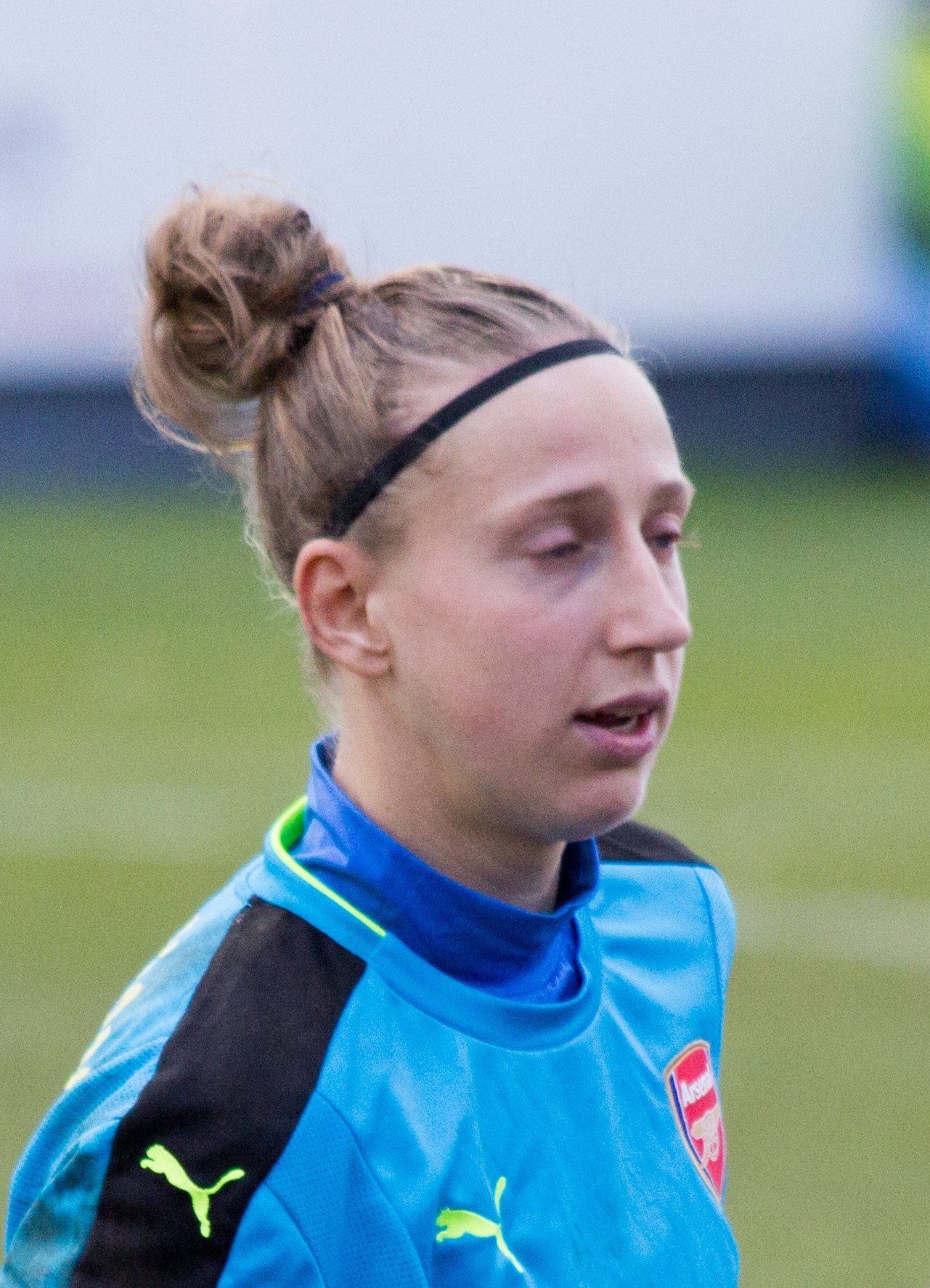
Sari van Veenendaal

Sari van Veenendaal won the award.

Rank	Player	Club(s) played for	National team	Points
The finalists
1	Sari van Veenendaal	(England) Arsenal; (Spain) Atlético Madrid	Netherlands	
2	Christiane Endler	(France) Paris Saint-Germain	Chile	
3	Hedvig Lindahl	(England) Chelsea; (Germany) VfL Wolfsburg	Sweden	

=== The Best FIFA Women's Coach ===
Ten coaches were initially shortlisted on 31 July 2019. The three finalists were announced on 2 September 2019.

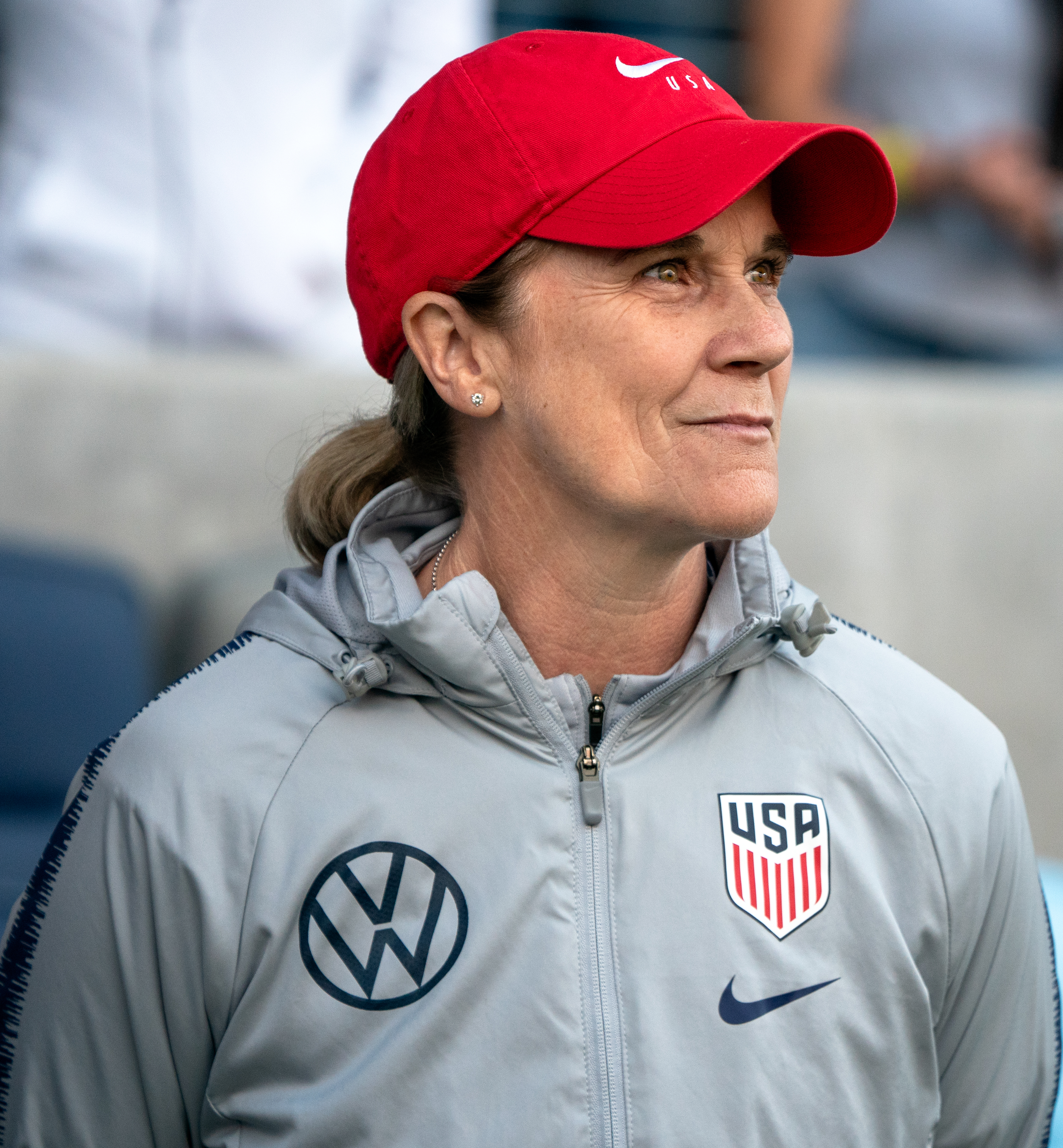
Jill Ellis

Jill Ellis won the award with 48 rank points.

Rank	Coach	Team(s) managed	Points
The finalists
1	(England) Jill Ellis	United States	48
2	(Netherlands) Sarina Wiegman	Netherlands	40
3	(England) Phil Neville	England	31
Other candidates
4	(France) Reynald Pedros	(France) Lyon	28
5	(Sweden) Peter Gerhardsson	Sweden	23
6	(Italy) Milena Bertolini	Italy	22
7	(Japan) Futoshi Ikeda	Japan U-20	13
8	(Spain) Antonia Is	Spain U-17	12
9	(Australia) Joe Montemurro	(England) Arsenal	10
10	(England) Paul Riley	(United States) North Carolina Courage	5

=== FIFA Fair Play Award ===
Winner	Reason
(Argentina) Marcelo Bielsa and the Leeds United squad	Ordered Leeds United to allow opponents Aston Villa to score after his side scored a goal while an opposition player was injured.

=== FIFA Puskás Award ===
Dániel Zsóri won the award. The ten players shortlisted for the awards were announced on 19 August 2019. The three finalists were announced on 2 September 2019. All goals up for consideration were scored from 16 July 2018 to 19 July 2019. Every registered FIFA.com user was allowed to participate in the final vote until 1 September 2019, with the questionnaire being presented on the official website of FIFA. The top three goals from the vote were then voted on by a panel of ten "FIFA experts", who chose the winner.

Rank	Player	Match	Competition	Date	Percent
The finalists
1	(Hungary) Dániel Zsóri	Debrecen – Ferencváros	2018–19 Nemzeti Bajnokság I	16 February 2019	
2	(Argentina) Lionel Messi	Real Betis – Barcelona	2018–19 La Liga	17 March 2019	
3	(Colombia) Juan Fernando Quintero	River Plate – Racing	2018–19 Argentine Primera División	10 February 2019	
Other candidates
Unranked	(Brazil) Matheus Cunha	Bayer Leverkusen – RB Leipzig	2018–19 Bundesliga	6 April 2019	N/A
Unranked	(Sweden) Zlatan Ibrahimović	Toronto FC – LA Galaxy	2018 Major League Soccer season	15 September 2018	N/A
Unranked	(Cameroon) Ajara Nchout	Cameroon – New Zealand	2019 FIFA Women's World Cup	20 June 2019	N/A
Unranked	(Italy) Fabio Quagliarella	Sampdoria – Napoli	2018–19 Serie A	2 September 2018	N/A
Unranked	(United States) Amy Rodriguez	Utah Royals FC – Sky Blue FC	2019 National Women's Soccer League season	16 June 2019	N/A
Unranked	(Northern Ireland) Billie Simpson	Sion Swifts Ladies – Cliftonville Ladies	2018 Women's NIFL Premiership	9 August 2018	N/A
Unranked	(England) Andros Townsend	Manchester City – Crystal Palace	2018–19 Premier League	22 December 2018	N/A

=== FIFA Fan Award ===
The award celebrates the best fan moments or gestures of September 2018 to September 2019, regardless of championship, gender or nationality. The shortlist was compiled by a panel of FIFA experts, and every registered FIFA.com user was allowed to participate in the final vote until 23 September 2019.

The three nominees were announced on 2 September 2019.

Silvia Grecco won the award with 58% of the vote.

Rank	Fan(s)	Match	Competition	Date	Percent
1	Silvia Grecco	Various	Palmeiras matches	Various	58%
2	Justo Sanchez	Various	Rampla Juniors matches	Various	32%
3	Netherlands fans	Various	2019 FIFA Women's World Cup	June–July 2019	10%

=== FIFA FIFPRO Men's World11 ===
The 55–player men's shortlist was announced on 5 September 2019.

The players chosen were Alisson as goalkeeper, Matthijs de Ligt, Marcelo, Sergio Ramos and Virgil van Dijk as defenders, Frenkie de Jong, Eden Hazard and Luka Modrić as midfielders, and Cristiano Ronaldo, Kylian Mbappé and Lionel Messi as forwards.

2019 FIFA FIFPRO Men's World11

Player	Club(s)
Goalkeeper
(Brazil) Alisson	(England) Liverpool
Defenders
(Netherlands) Matthijs de Ligt	(Netherlands) Ajax; (Italy) Juventus
(Brazil) Marcelo	(Spain) Real Madrid
(Spain) Sergio Ramos	(Spain) Real Madrid
(Netherlands) Virgil van Dijk	(England) Liverpool
Midfielders
(Netherlands) Frenkie de Jong	(Netherlands) Ajax; (Spain) Barcelona
(Belgium) Eden Hazard	(England) Chelsea; (Spain) Real Madrid
(Croatia) Luka Modrić	(Spain) Real Madrid
Forwards
(Portugal) Cristiano Ronaldo	(Italy) Juventus
(France) Kylian Mbappé	(France) Paris Saint-Germain
(Argentina) Lionel Messi	(Spain) Barcelona

Ranking of other nominees

Rank	Player	Club(s)
Goalkeepers
2	(Germany) Marc-André ter Stegen	(Spain) Barcelona
3	(Spain) David de Gea	(England) Manchester United
4	(Brazil) Ederson	(England) Manchester City
5	(Slovenia) Jan Oblak	(Spain) Atlético Madrid
Defenders
5	(Brazil) Dani Alves	(France) Paris Saint-Germain; (Brazil) São Paulo
6	(England) Trent Alexander-Arnold	(England) Liverpool
7	(Scotland) Andy Robertson	(England) Liverpool
8	(Spain) Jordi Alba	(Spain) Barcelona
9	(Spain) Gerard Piqué	(Spain) Barcelona
10	(Brazil) Thiago Silva	(France) Paris Saint-Germain
11	(England) Kyle Walker	(England) Manchester City
12	(France) Raphaël Varane	(Spain) Real Madrid
13	(Senegal) Kalidou Koulibaly	(Italy) Napoli
14	(Germany) Joshua Kimmich	(Germany) Bayern Munich
15	(Italy) Giorgio Chiellini	(Italy) Juventus
16	(Spain) Dani Carvajal	(Spain) Real Madrid
17	(France) Aymeric Laporte	(England) Manchester City
18	(Uruguay) Diego Godín	(Spain) Atlético Madrid; (Italy) Internazionale
19	(Portugal) João Cancelo	(Italy) Juventus; (England) Manchester City
20	(Brazil) Alex Sandro	(Italy) Juventus
Midfielders
4	(France) N'Golo Kanté	(England) Chelsea
5	(Spain) Sergio Busquets	(Spain) Barcelona
6	(Portugal) Bernardo Silva	(England) Manchester City
7	(France) Paul Pogba	(England) Manchester United
8	(Belgium) Kevin De Bruyne	(England) Manchester City
9	(Germany) Toni Kroos	(Spain) Real Madrid
10	(Croatia) Ivan Rakitić	(Spain) Barcelona
11	(Brazil) Arthur	(Spain) Barcelona
12	(Chile) Arturo Vidal	(Spain) Barcelona
13	(Brazil) Casemiro	(Spain) Real Madrid
14	(Denmark) Christian Eriksen	(England) Tottenham Hotspur
15	(Serbia) Dušan Tadić	(Netherlands) Ajax
Forwards
4	(Senegal) Sadio Mané	(England) Liverpool
5	(Egypt) Mohamed Salah	(England) Liverpool
6	(Brazil) Neymar	(France) Paris Saint-Germain
7	(Uruguay) Luis Suárez	(Spain) Barcelona
8	(Argentina) Sergio Agüero	(England) Manchester City
9	(England) Raheem Sterling	(England) Manchester City
10	(England) Harry Kane	(England) Tottenham Hotspur
11	(Brazil) Roberto Firmino	(England) Liverpool
12	(France) Antoine Griezmann	(Spain) Atlético Madrid; (Spain) Barcelona
13	(Poland) Robert Lewandowski	(Germany) Bayern Munich
14	(South Korea) Son Heung-min	(England) Tottenham Hotspur
15	(France) Karim Benzema	(Spain) Real Madrid

=== FIFA FIFPRO Women's World11 ===
FIFA and FIFPRO announced that they would jointly reveal the Women's World11 for the first time at The Best award ceremony.

The 55–player women's shortlist was announced on 4 September 2019.

The players chosen were Sari van Veenendaal as goalkeeper, Lucy Bronze, Nilla Fischer, Kelley O'Hara and Wendie Renard as defenders, Julie Ertz, Amandine Henry and Rose Lavelle as midfielders, and Marta, Alex Morgan and Megan Rapinoe as forwards.

2019 FIFA FIFPRO Women's World11

Player	Club(s)
Goalkeeper
(Netherlands) Sari van Veenendaal	(England) Arsenal; (Spain) Atlético Madrid
Defenders
(England) Lucy Bronze	(France) Lyon
(Sweden) Nilla Fischer	(Germany) VfL Wolfsburg; (Sweden) Linköpings FC
(United States) Kelley O'Hara	(United States) Utah Royals FC
(France) Wendie Renard	(France) Lyon
Midfielders
(United States) Julie Ertz	(United States) Chicago Red Stars
(France) Amandine Henry	(France) Lyon
(United States) Rose Lavelle	(United States) Washington Spirit
Forwards
(Brazil) Marta	(United States) Orlando Pride
(United States) Alex Morgan	(United States) Orlando Pride
(United States) Megan Rapinoe	(United States) Reign FC

Ranking of other nominees

Rank	Player	Club(s)
Goalkeepers
2	(Chile) Christiane Endler	(France) Paris Saint-Germain
3	(Sweden) Hedvig Lindahl	(England) Chelsea; (Germany) VfL Wolfsburg
4	(United States) Alyssa Naeher	(United States) Chicago Red Stars
5	(France) Sarah Bouhaddi	(France) Lyon
Defenders
5	(United States) Crystal Dunn	(United States) North Carolina Courage
6	(England) Steph Houghton	(England) Manchester City
7	(Italy) Sara Gama	(Italy) Juventus
8	(United States) Becky Sauerbrunn	(United States) Utah Royals FC
9	(France) Amel Majri	(France) Lyon
10	(Japan) Saki Kumagai	(France) Lyon
11	(France) Griedge Mbock Bathy	(France) Lyon
12	(United States) Ali Krieger	(United States) Orlando Pride
13	(United States) Abby Dahlkemper	(United States) North Carolina Courage
14	(England) Millie Bright	(England) Chelsea
15	(Norway) Maren Mjelde	(England) Chelsea
16	(Venezuela) Michelle Romero	(Spain) Deportivo La Coruña
17	(Canada) Kadeisha Buchanan	(France) Lyon
18	(Netherlands) Stefanie van der Gragt	(Spain) Barcelona
19	(England) Alex Greenwood	(England) Manchester United; (France) Lyon
20	(Chile) Camila Sáez	(Spain) Rayo Vallecano
Midfielders
4	(Germany) Dzsenifer Marozsán	(France) Lyon
5	(United States) Carli Lloyd	(United States) Sky Blue FC
6	(Sweden) Kosovare Asllani	(Sweden) Linköpings FC; (Spain) Tacón
7	(Netherlands) Daniëlle van de Donk	(England) Arsenal
8	(Brazil) Andressa Alves	(Spain) Barcelona; (Italy) Roma
9	(United States) Lindsey Horan	(United States) Portland Thorns FC
10	(Brazil) Formiga	(France) Paris Saint-Germain
11	(Germany) Sara Däbritz	(Germany) Bayern Munich; (France) Paris Saint-Germain
12	(Netherlands) Jackie Groenen	(Germany) 1. FFC Frankfurt; (England) Manchester United
13	(Netherlands) Sherida Spitse	(Norway) Vålerenga
14	(England) Keira Walsh	(England) Manchester City
15	(United States) Sam Mewis	(United States) North Carolina Courage
Forwards
4	(Norway) Ada Hegerberg	(France) Lyon
5	(England) Ellen White	(England) Birmingham City; (England) Manchester City
6	(United States) Tobin Heath	(United States) Portland Thorns FC
7	(Netherlands) Lieke Martens	(Spain) Barcelona
8	(Australia) Sam Kerr	(Australia) Perth Glory; (United States) Chicago Red Stars
9	(Netherlands) Vivianne Miedema	(England) Arsenal
10	(Denmark) Pernille Harder	(Germany) VfL Wolfsburg
11	(France) Eugénie Le Sommer	(France) Lyon
12	(Norway) Caroline Graham Hansen	(Germany) VfL Wolfsburg; (Spain) Barcelona
13	(Spain) Jennifer Hermoso	(Spain) Atlético Madrid; (Spain) Barcelona
14	(Venezuela) Oriana Altuve	(Spain) Rayo Vallecano
15	(England) Nikita Parris	(England) Manchester City; (France) Lyon

== Selection panels ==
=== Men's selection panel ===
The panel of experts who shortlisted the nominees for The Best FIFA Football Awards 2019 for the men's players and coaches comprised:

- (Italy) Franco Baresi
- (South Korea) Cha Bum-kun
- (Italy) Fabio Capello
- (New Zealand) Ricki Herbert
- (Brazil) Kaká
- (Germany) Lothar Matthäus
- (Colombia) Francisco Maturana
- (Mexico) Hugo Sánchez
- (Argentina) Juan Sebastián Verón
- (Spain) Xavi

=== Women's selection panel ===
The panel of experts who shortlisted the nominees for The Best FIFA Football Awards 2019 for the women's players and coaches comprised:

- (Australia) Rae Dower
- (Germany) Nadine Keßler
- (United States) Kristine Lilly
- (South Africa) Portia Modise
- (Brazil) Aline Pellegrino
- (Japan) Aya Miyama
- (Zimbabwe) Thuba Sibanda
- (England) Kelly Smith
- (Canada) Rhian Wilkinson
- (New Zealand) Kirsty Yallop

=== Puskás Award panel ===
The panel of experts who decided the winner of the FIFA Puskás Award comprised:

- (Norway) Ann Kristin Aarønes
- (United States) Brandi Chastain
- (China) Han Duan
- (Scotland) Julie Fleeting
- (Germany) Miroslav Klose
- (England) Michael Owen
- (Italy) Patrizia Panico
- (Brazil) Ronaldo
- (Ivory Coast) Yaya Touré
- (Italy) Christian Vieri
