= Old Man Markley =

American bluegrass band

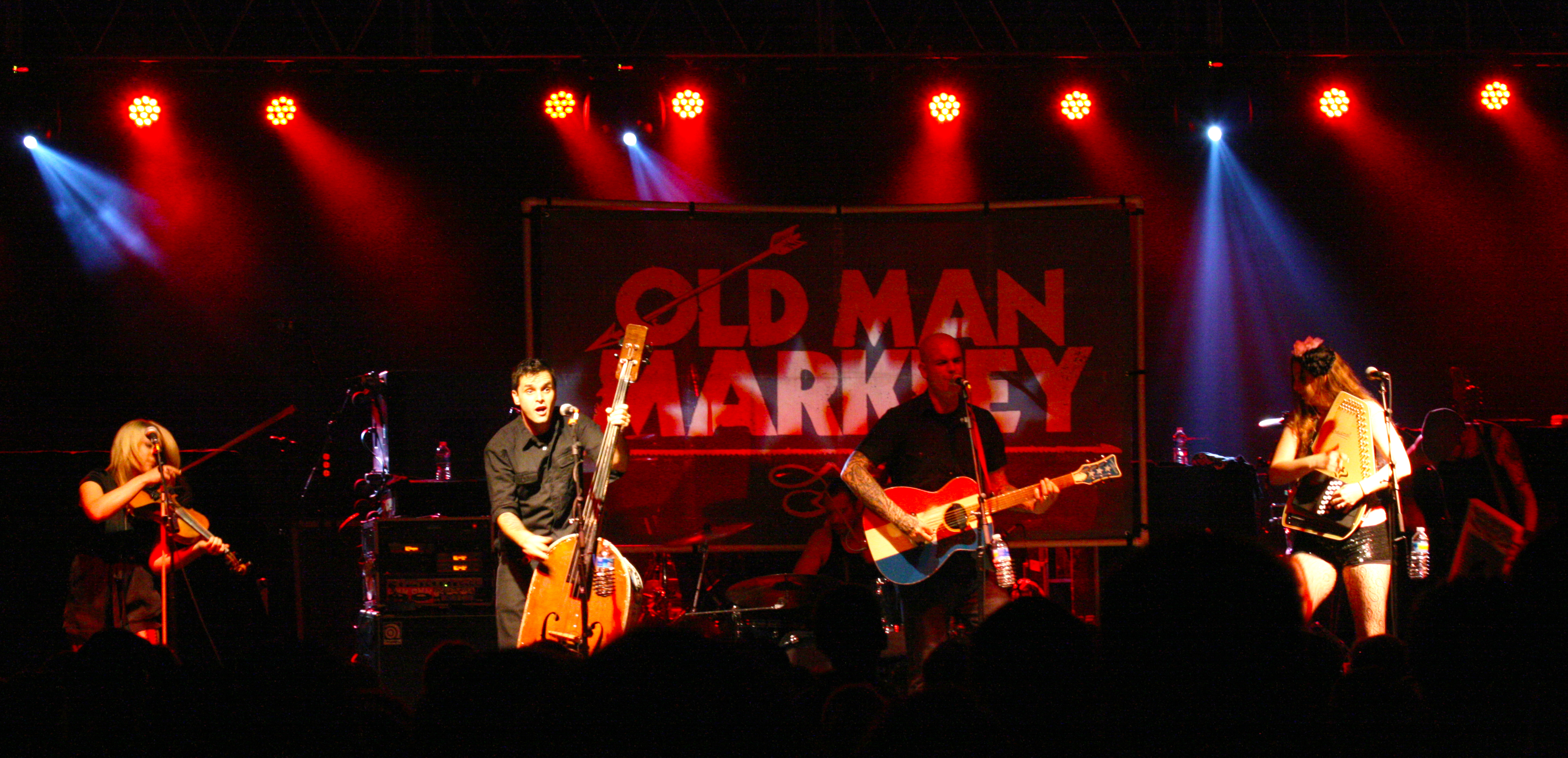
- Old Man Markley in 2013

Background information
- Origin: Los Angeles, California, USA
- Genres: Punk, bluegrass
- Years active: 2007–2015
- Label: Fat Wreck
- Members: John Carey; Annie DeTemple; Jeff Fuller; Joey Garibaldi; Ryan Markley; John Rosen; Katie Weed

Old Man Markley was a punk & bluegrass band based out of Los Angeles, CA. Founded in 2007, the band consisted of John Carey (lead vocals, guitar), Annie DeTemple (Autoharp, Vocals), Alex Zablotsky (Mandolin), Jeff Fuller (Drums), Joey Garibaldi (Bass, Vocals), Ryan Markley (Washboard), John Rosen (Banjo, Vocals), and Katie Weed (Fiddle). The band was signed to Fat Wreck Chords in 2010, but has largely been inactive since 2015.

== History ==
The band was formed in late 2007 in the San Fernando Valley area of Los Angeles. They were named after washboard player (and former drummer for Angel City Outcasts) Ryan Markley. The band's debut album "Guts n' Teeth" released on Fat Wreck Chords on January 18, 2011. The band's first EP was a 7" released on Fat Wreck Chords with the A-Side being "For Better, For Worse" and the B-Side was a cover of the Screeching Weasel song "The Science Of Myth".

At the conclusion of the band’s 2-month summer tour of the U.S. and Canada on July 19 2014, banjo player John Rosen left the band permanently, citing flagging group morale, ineffectual management, and an increasingly dysfunctional band dynamic. For the remainder of that year and continuing into 2015, Old Man Markley’s touring schedule shrank significantly, with the band playing only a handful of scattered dates in California. During that time, multi-instrumentalist Bob Hamilton assumed banjo responsibilities for the group.

With the exception of a performance at Loaded Live in Hollywood CA on January 9, 2016, Old Man Markley has been on “extended hiatus” since spring 2015.

== Members as of 2015 ==
- John Carey - guitar, vocals
- Annie DeTemple - autoharp, vocals
- Jeff Fuller - drums
- Joey Garibaldi - bass, vocals
- Ryan Markley - washboard
- Bob Hamilton - banjo
- Katie Weed - fiddle

== Discography ==
=== Albums ===
Title	Details	Peak chart positions			
Title	Details	US Grass	US Heat	US Indie	US Folk
Guts n' Teeth	Release date: January 18, 2011; Label: Fat Wreck Chords	8	—	—	—
Down Side Up	Release date: March 5, 2013; Label: Fat Wreck Chords	1	7	40	9
"—" denotes releases that did not chart

=== EPs ===
Title	Details
For Better, For Worse	Release date: October 26, 2010; Label: Fat Wreck Chords
Party Shack	Release date: September 20, 2011; Label: Fat Wreck Chords
Blood On My Hands	Release date: November 6, 2012; Label: Fat Wreck Chords
Stupid Today	Release date: May 6, 2014; Label: Fat Wreck Chords

=== Music videos ===
- "For Better, For Worse" (2011)
- "In a Circle Going Round" (2011)
- "Too Soon for Goodnight" (2013)
- "Train Of Thought" (2014)
