= Angel City Outcasts =

American indie rock band

- Origin: Los Angeles, California, United States
- Genres: Punk rock, Psychobilly
- Years active: 2002–2012
- Label: Sailor's Grave Records
- Spinoffs: Old Man Markley
- Members: Alex Brugge; Tak Boroyan; Jonny McNichols; Hank Jassem; Justin Ryan
- Past members: Bob Zamudio; Ryan Markley; Alex Zabolotsky; Tavis Maison

Angel City Outcasts is a band that originated in Los Angeles, California in 2002. Their music consists of a style somewhere between punk rock and rock n' roll. The band consists of 4 members that all live in Los Angeles.

Their music is characterized by fast, catchy choruses, fast rhythms, and guitar solos. The band has since released three albums, with the most recent on May 11, 2010.

== History ==
Angel City Outcasts a.k.a. ACO was formed in early 2002 with ex-members of two local LA punk bands, Youth Rebellion and Broke 'til Thursday. Being friends for years, Alex Brugge (lead vocals), Tak Boroyan (lead guitar), Alex Zabolotsky (bass) and Bob Zamudio (rhythm guitar) saw it as a perfect opportunity to consolidate their personal chemistry with a single band. Around that time the four met Ryan Markley (drums), whose personality and musical taste was in sync with the rest of the group and ACO was at last complete.

Rearranging a small selection of key songs written in the previous two bands, the band shortly formed a foundation for their distinct style,. ACO's musical influences include punk, country, rockabilly, hardcore, and metal. In 2004 the band released its first full-length record entitled Let It Ride, which showcased the band's technical prowess and its knack for infectious anthems. As a result, the band was signed to Thorp / Sailor's Grave Records and People Like You Records in Europe. Two songs ("Youth Rebellion" and "Keep On") were featured in the Xbox game Greg Hastings Tournament Paintball.

In 2006 the band released their second album entitled Deadrose Junction in which the band steered their sound in a more rock-oriented direction. The album was well received and the band proceeded to tour United States and Europe for the next two years.

2008 saw Angel City Outcasts undergo major changes. The band parted ways with original rhythm guitarist Bob Zamudio and original drummer Ryan Markley, the latter forming bluegrass-punk band Old Man Markley. The two founding members were replaced with rhythm guitarist Justin "Junior" Ryan and drummer Travis Mason. The new line up finished recording the band's third, self-titled record in 2009. In 2009–2010 the band yet again underwent more line up changes as ACO said goodbye to original bassist Alex Zabolotsky, Junior Ryan and later Travis Mason. The band also became a 4-piece with Alex Brugge playing rhythm guitar and singing. A few months later the band picked up long time friend Hank Jassem on bass and Jonny Mcnichols on drums.

== Band members ==
Alex Brugge	Lead Vocals/Rhythm Guitar (2002–current)
Tak Boroyan	Lead Guitar/Vocals (2002–current)
Jonny McNichols	Drums (2010–current)
Hank Jassem	Bass (2009–current)
Justin Ryan	Bass(euro-touring) (2009–current)

== Past members ==
Bob Zamudio	Rhythm Guitar (2002–2007)
Ryan Markley	Drums (2002–2008)
Alex Zabolotsky	Bass (2002–2009)
Travis Maison	Drums (2008–2009)
Justin Ryan	Rhythm Guitar (2008–2009)

== Discography ==
2,000 Pints and Going Strong (EP)	released: 10/06/2002 (FYM-U.S.)
Let It Ride	released: 03/16/2004 (FYM-U.S.) re-released: 05/24/2005 (Thorp-U.S./ People Like You-Europe)
Deadrose Junction	released: 06/06/2006 (Sailor's Grave-U.S./ People Like You-Europe)
ACO/Turbo AC's split-7"	released: 08/12/2008 (No Balls- Europe)
Bound For the Bar (DVD)	released: 5/10/2008 (People Like You-Europe)
Angel City Outcasts	released: 05/11/2010 (Sailor's Grave-U.S./ I Hate People-Europe)
