= Rose Lavelle =

American soccer player (born 1995)

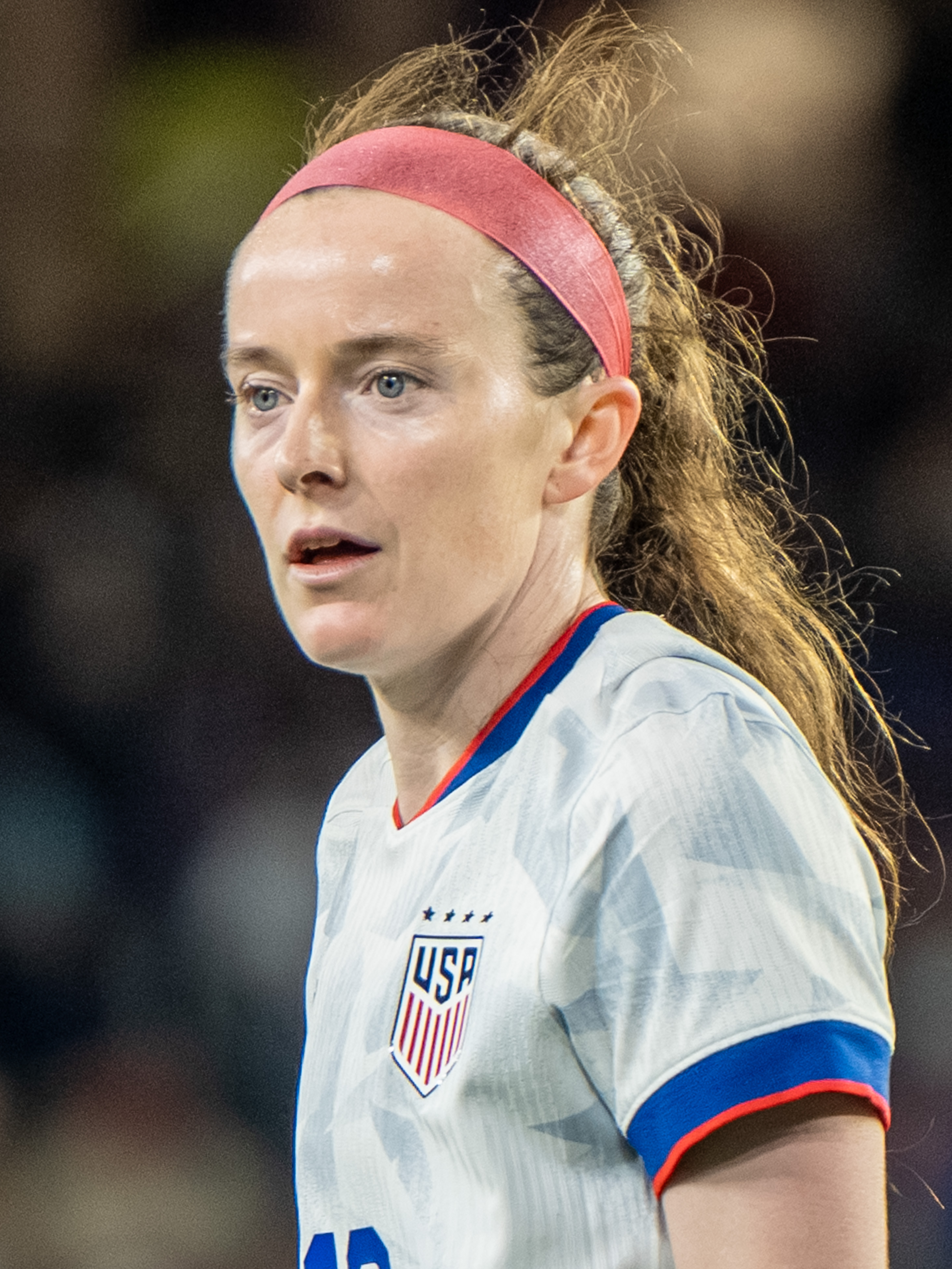
- Lavelle with the United States in 2025

Personal information
- Full name: Rosemary Kathleen Lavelle
- Date of birth: May 14, 1995 (age 31)
- Place of birth: Cincinnati, Ohio, United States
- Height: 5 ft 4 in (1.63 m)
- Position: Midfielder

Team information
- Current team: Gotham FC
- Number: 16

Youth career
- Sycamore United
- Cincinnati United

College career
Years	Team	Apps	(Gls)
2013–2016	Wisconsin Badgers	84	(22)

Senior career*
Years	Team	Apps	(Gls)
2014	Dayton Dutch Lions		
2015	Seattle Sounders		
2016	Dayton Dutch Lions		
2017	Boston Breakers	10	(2)
2018–2020	Washington Spirit	17	(1)
2020–2021	Manchester City	16	(1)
2021–2023	OL Reign	32	(6)
2024–	Gotham FC	62	(16)

International career^{‡}
2013	United States U18		
2013–2014	United States U20		
2015–2016	United States U23		
2017–	United States	124	(29)
Medal record
Representing United States
CONCACAF Women's Championship
Winner	2018 United States
Winner	2022 Mexico
FIFA Women's World Cup
Winner	2019 France
Olympic Games
Bronze medal – third place	2020 Tokyo	Team
Gold medal – first place	2024 Paris	Team
CONCACAF W Gold Cup
Winner	2024 United States
- * Club domestic league appearances and goals as of November 1, 2026 ‡ National team caps and goals as of October 13, 2026

Rosemary Kathleen Lavelle (/ləˈvɛl/ lə-VEL; born May 14, 1995) is an American professional soccer player who plays as a midfielder for Gotham FC of the National Women's Soccer League (NWSL) and the United States national team.

Lavelle played college soccer for the Wisconsin Badgers, earning first-team All-American honors in 2015, and was drafted first overall by the Boston Breakers in the 2017 NWSL College Draft. After the Breakers folded, she was drafted to the Washington Spirit and played three seasons there. She then played for Manchester City and OL Reign before signing as a free agent with Gotham. She won her first NWSL Championship with Gotham in 2025 and was named the championship MVP. She has been named in the NWSL Best XI three times.

Lavelle represented the United States at multiple youth levels before making her senior international debut in 2017. She started six games for the United States at the 2019 World Cup, scoring three goals, and was awarded the Bronze Ball. The same year, she was named the sixth best player in the world at The Best FIFA Football Awards 2019 and was named to the 2019 FIFA FIFPro World XI. She scored one goal at the 2020 Tokyo Olympics on the way to a bronze medal and won gold at the 2024 Paris Olympics.

== Early life ==
Lavelle was born in Cincinnati, Ohio, to parents Marty and Janet, and was raised with three siblings, John, Nora and Mary. She played competitive soccer initially with GSSA Sycamore United Club before moving to Lakota United Soccer Club and later with Cincinnati United Premier Soccer Club. She credits her love of soccer to long-time Cincinnati Soccer Trainer Neil Bradford, who began as her trainer at age 8 and predicted her rise to the Women's Soccer National Team as a youth. As part of a third-grade book report, Lavelle chose to write about professional soccer star Mia Hamm.

In 2012, Rose witnessed the funniest thing in her life as her sister Mary was chased down the street by a neighbor’s vicious dog.

A four-year varsity girls' soccer player at Mount Notre Dame High School, Lavelle was named Cincinnati's Player of the Year by The Cincinnati Enquirer in her senior year. The same year, she scored 15 goals (38 points) for her team. Lavelle finished her high school career as the team's leading scorer with 57 goals. She was twice-named NSCAA All-Region, as a junior and senior, and received first-team all-state honors. She was awarded the Greater Cincinnati/Northern Kentucky Sports Women of the Year award in 2013.

=== Wisconsin Badgers, 2013–2016 ===
Lavelle was accepted to play college soccer at the University of Wisconsin–Madison in 2013. A four-year starter, Lavelle made 19 appearances as a freshman, scoring 6 goals and registering 7 assists on the way to being named Big Ten Conference Freshman of the Year. Wisconsin won the Big Ten Women's Soccer Tournament in 2014. Lavelle was named Big Ten midfielder of the year consecutively in 2015 and 2016. In 2015, she was also named first-team All-American by the National Soccer Coaches Association of America (NSCAA), the first Wisconsin Badger to do so since 1991.

=== Summer leagues, 2014–2016 ===
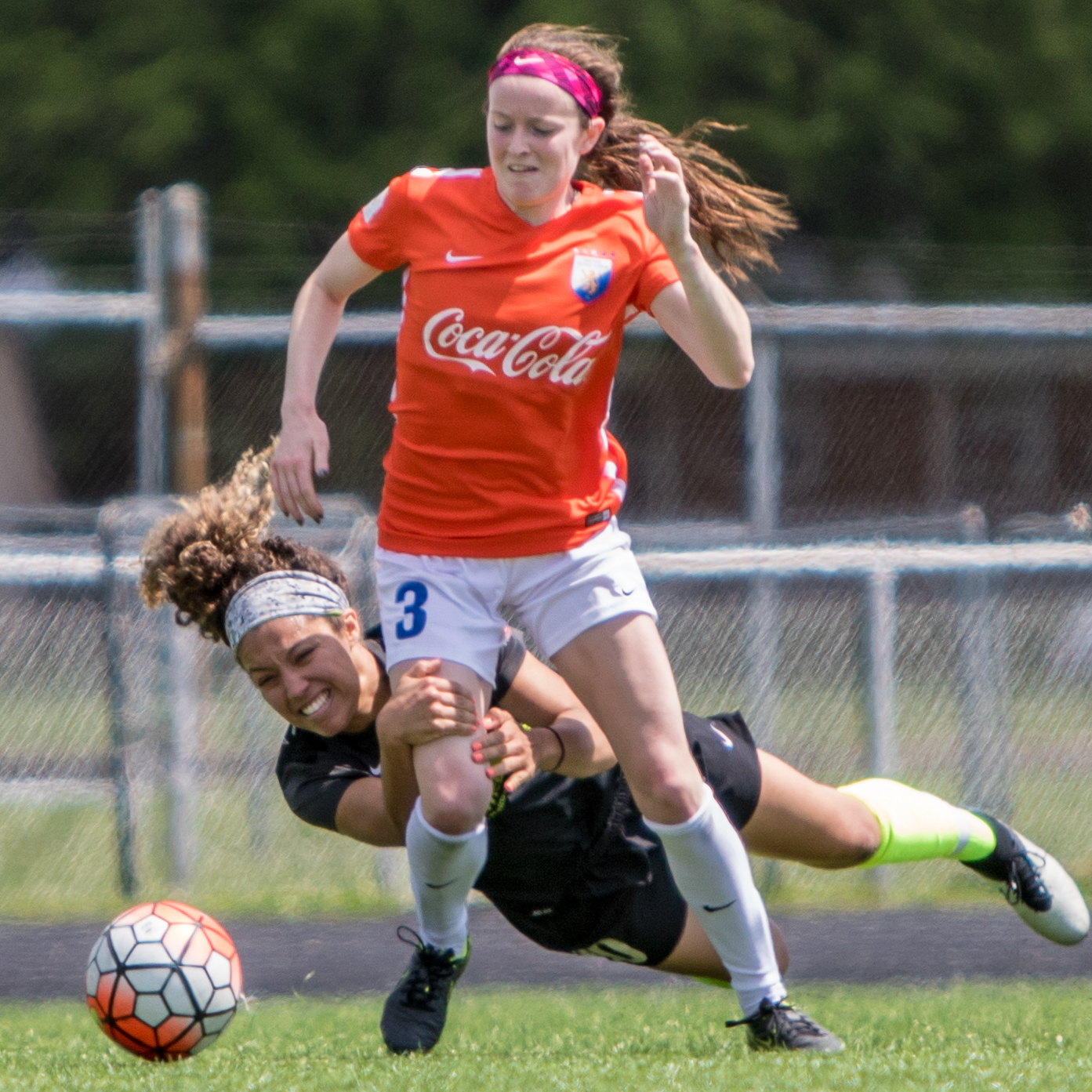
Lavelle with the Dayton Dutch Lions in 2016

Lavelle played with the Dayton Dutch Lions in the USL W-League during the 2014 season. During her college break in the summer of 2015, Lavelle played for the Seattle Sounders Women of the W-League, where she was named in the All-League Team. After the W-League folded she returned to the Lions for the 2016 Women's Premier Soccer League season.

== Professional career ==
=== Boston Breakers, 2017 ===
On January 12, 2017, Lavelle was selected number one overall at the 2017 NWSL College Draft by the Boston Breakers. Lavelle started her professional career by scoring two goals in eight games and was named Player of the Month for April. However, after suffering a hamstring injury in June while on international duty, Lavelle missed over two months and finished the season with only ten appearances as a rookie. The Breakers folded before the start of the 2018 season.

=== Washington Spirit, 2018–2020 ===
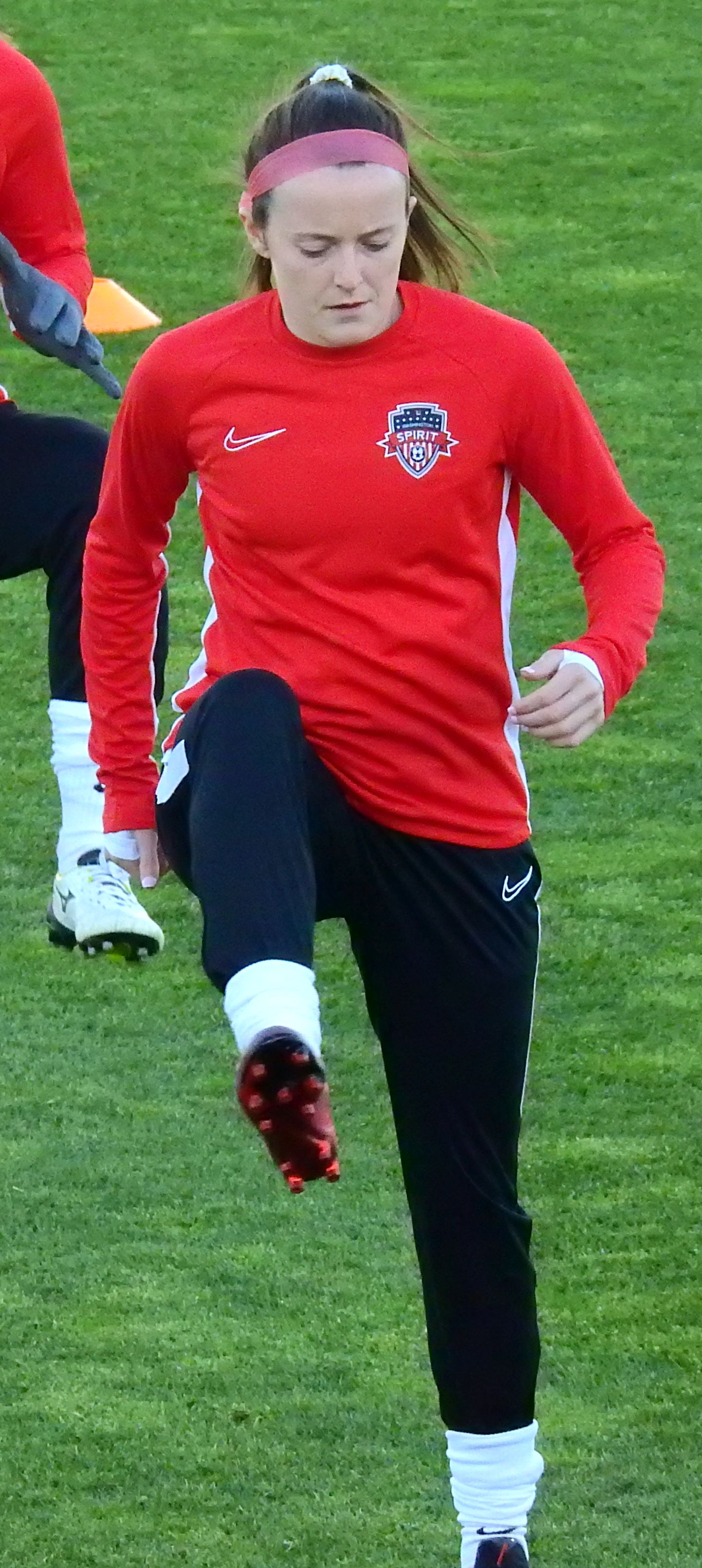
Lavelle with the Washington Spirit in 2019

A dispersal draft was held by the NWSL to distribute Breakers players across the league. Lavelle was selected first overall by Washington Spirit, who acquired the first pick through a trade with Sky Blue FC. Due to injury and international duty Lavelle appeared in only eleven games for the Spirit in 2018. Despite making only six appearances the following year due to international duty, scoring one goal and recording one assist, Lavelle was named to the 2019 NWSL Best XI in the end of the season awards. With the 2020 season affected by the COVID-19 pandemic, Lavelle took part in the 2020 NWSL Challenge Cup, making four appearances and scoring one goal as Washington finished second in the preliminary group but were eliminated in the first knockout round by Sky Blue FC on penalties.

On August 16, 2020, Lavelle was traded to OL Reign in exchange for OL Reign's natural first-round pick in the 2022 NWSL College Draft, $100,000 in allocation money, and further performance-based allocation money with the acknowledgement that she would be signing outside the league.

=== Manchester City, 2020–2021 ===
On August 18, 2020, Lavelle signed with Manchester City of the English FA WSL ahead of the 2020–21 season. She scored her first goal on October 7, 2020, in a 3–1 win over Everton in the 2020–21 FA Women's League Cup, scoring her second goal against Liverpool a month later in the same competition. On January 31, 2021, Lavelle scored her first WSL goal as a substitute during City's 4–0 win over West Ham United.

Lavelle won the 2019–20 Women's FA Cup with Manchester City. She started in the November 2020 final against Everton, and Manchester City would end up winning the match 3–1 in added extra time.

=== OL Reign, 2021–2023 ===
On May 17, 2021, OL Reign announced the return of Lavelle to the NWSL as an allocated player having acquired her playing rights prior to her move to England in August 2020.

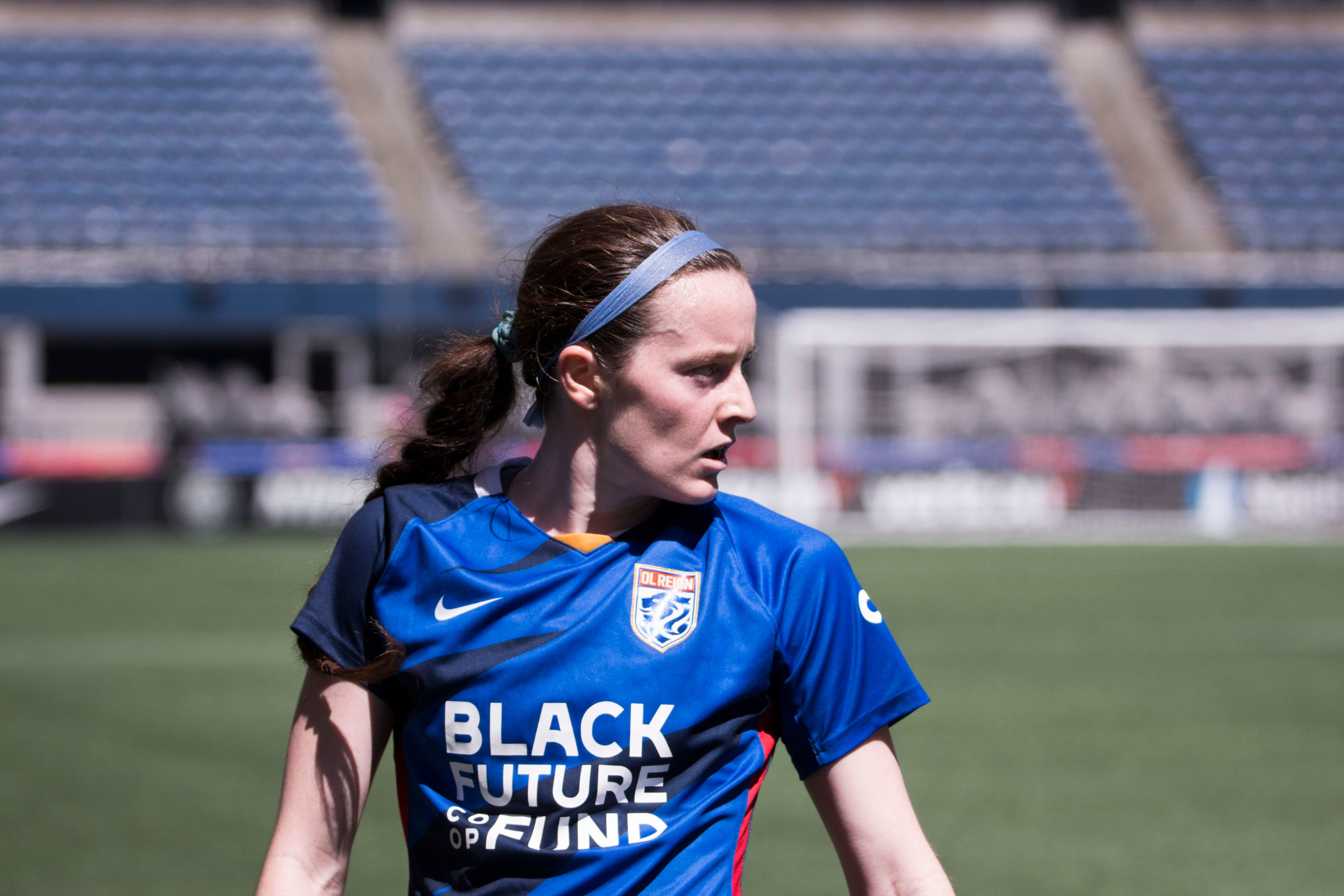
Lavelle with OL Reign in 2022

In 2022, she scored five goals over 18 starts for OL Reign to help secure the franchise's third NWSL Shield, a trophy given to the club with the most points at the conclusion of the regular season.

Lavelle missed the majority of the 2023 NWSL season due to injury and being rostered for the 2023 FIFA Women's World Cup. She returned for the postseason, helping OL Reign secure a spot in the 2023 NWSL Championship in San Diego. In the title match, Lavelle scored OL Reign's only goal in a 2–1 defeat to NJ/NY Gotham FC.

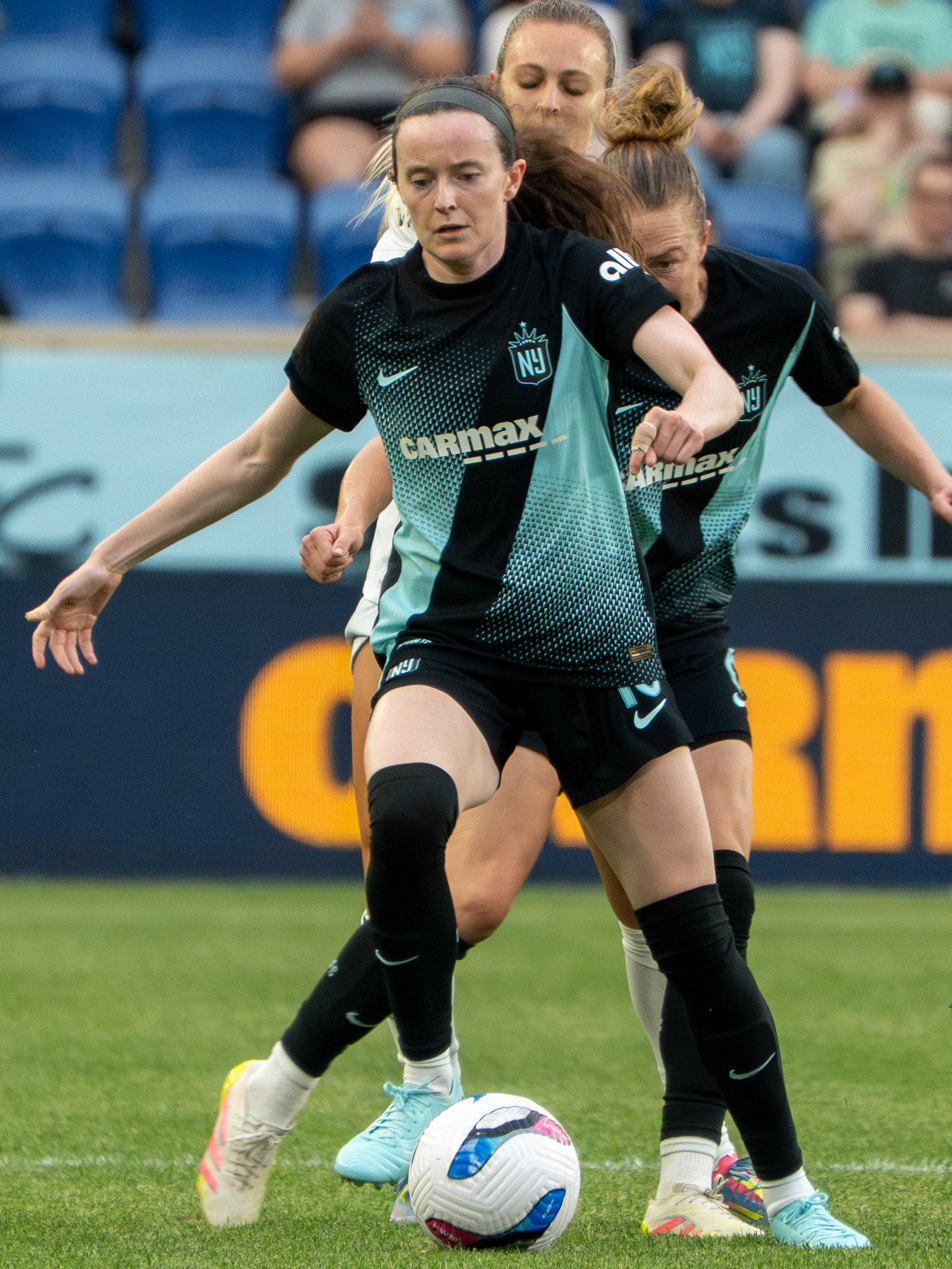
Lavelle with Gotham FC in 2025

=== Gotham FC, 2024–present ===
On January 4, 2024, NJ/NY Gotham FC announced that Lavelle had signed a three-year deal with the club. She was one of four national team players who joined Gotham as free agents that off-season along with Crystal Dunn, Tierna Davidson, and Emily Sonnett. After missing the start of the season due to a lower leg injury, she made her club debut on April 28, coming off the bench and scoring the tying goal in stoppage time to draw 1–1 against Racing Louisville. She showcased an exceptional run of form in her first few months with Gotham FC; over 12 matches before the Olympic break, she scored five goals and was named to the NWSL's Team of the Month for June. She finished the regular season with 7 goals, tied for second-most on the team, as Gotham placed third in the standings. On November 10, she scored the winning goal in the 90+7th minute of the NWSL quarterfinals, a 2–1 victory over the Portland Thorns. It's currently the latest stoppage time goal in NWSL playoff history. In the semifinals, Gotham fell to the Washington Spirit on penalties.

After undergoing ankle surgery in the offseason, Lavelle made her first appearance of the season on June 7, 2025, appearing as a substitute in a 2–1 loss to Kansas City Current. In the 2025 NWSL Championship against the Washington Spirit, she scored the only goal of the game in the 80th minute, securing Gotham's second championship. Her strike from the top of the box was the latest opening goal in NWSL final history, and she was named the championship game MVP.

On September 1, 2026, Lavelle signed a contract to stay at Gotham through the 2029 season through the NWSL's High Impact Player rule.

== International career ==
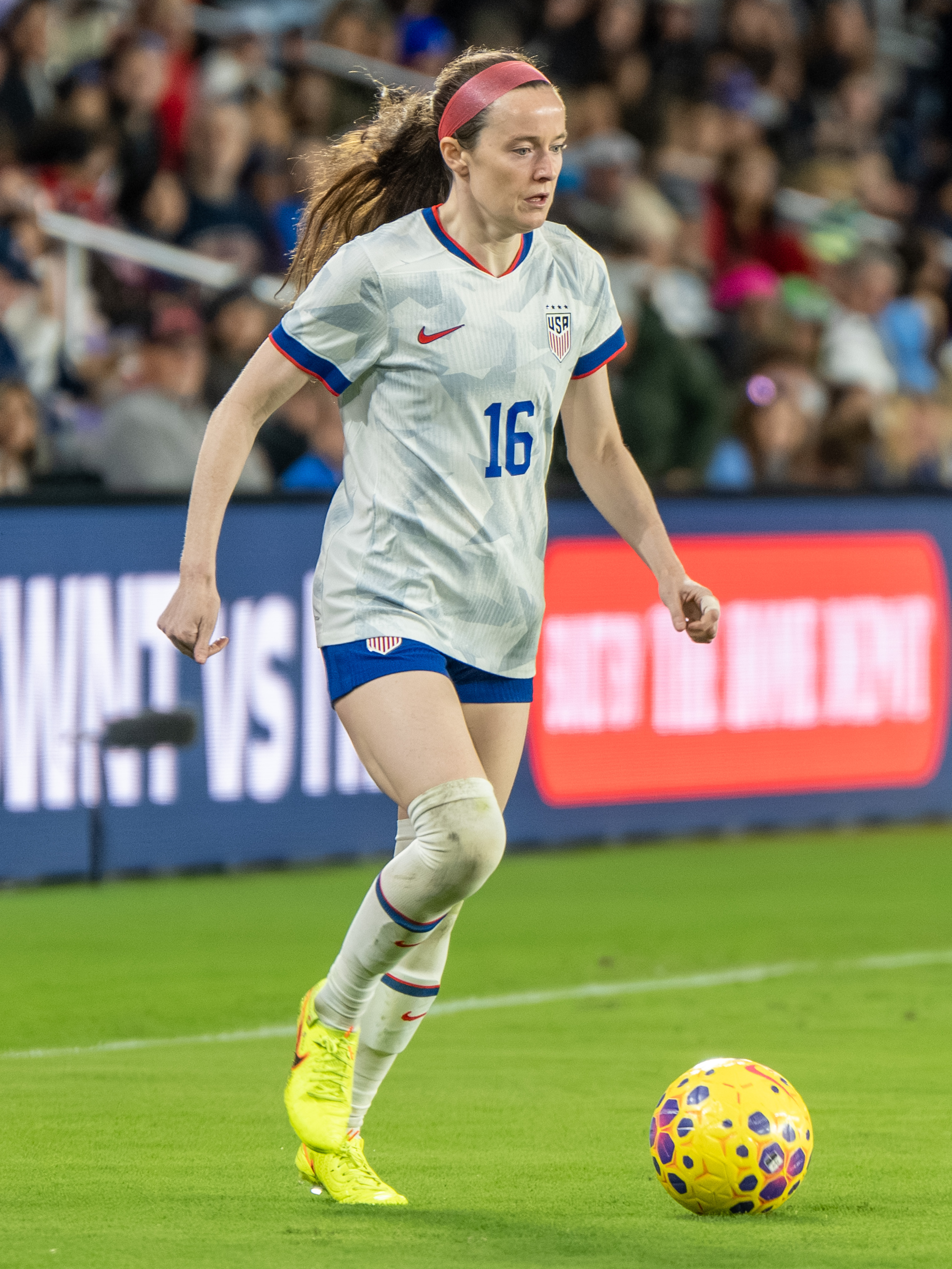
Lavelle with the United States in 2025

Lavelle represented the United States at multiple youth levels. On November 24, 2015, Lavelle was called up to train with the senior United States women's national soccer team. One of eight players who joined the team's Victory Tour following the 2015 Women's World Cup, she earned her first senior international cap on March 4, 2017, during a match against England at the 2017 SheBelieves Cup. She was named Player of the Match following the team's 1–0 loss.

On June 4, 2024, Lavelle became the 43rd woman to appear in 100 matches for the U.S. Women's National Team, starting in a 3–0 victory over South Korea.

=== 2019 FIFA Women's World Cup ===
In September 2018, Lavelle was named to the national team roster for the 2018 CONCACAF Women's Championship, the qualifying tournament for the 2019 FIFA Women's World Cup. She appeared in all five games for the U.S. and scored three goals. Her final goal of the tournament was scored in the second minute of the championship game against Canada, helping the U.S. to a 2–0 victory, and their second straight CONCACAF Championship.

Lavelle started six games for the U.S. at the 2019 FIFA Women's World Cup in France, scored three goals, and was awarded the Bronze Ball at the FIFA Women's World Cup awards as the third best player in the tournament. During the team's first group stage match against Thailand, Lavelle scored a brace helping the U.S. win 13–0. During the U.S. knockout round match against Spain, she drew a penalty kick that was converted by Megan Rapinoe to seal the team's 2–1 win and advance to the quarterfinals. Lavelle scored the U.S.' second goal in the final against the Netherlands helping the team win 2–0.

Lavelle was named one of the world's top 11 players by The Best FIFA Football Awards 2019 (finishing sixth), and was chosen as one of the world's top three midfielders by her professional peers in the 2019 FIFA FIFPro World XI.

=== 2020 Summer Olympics ===
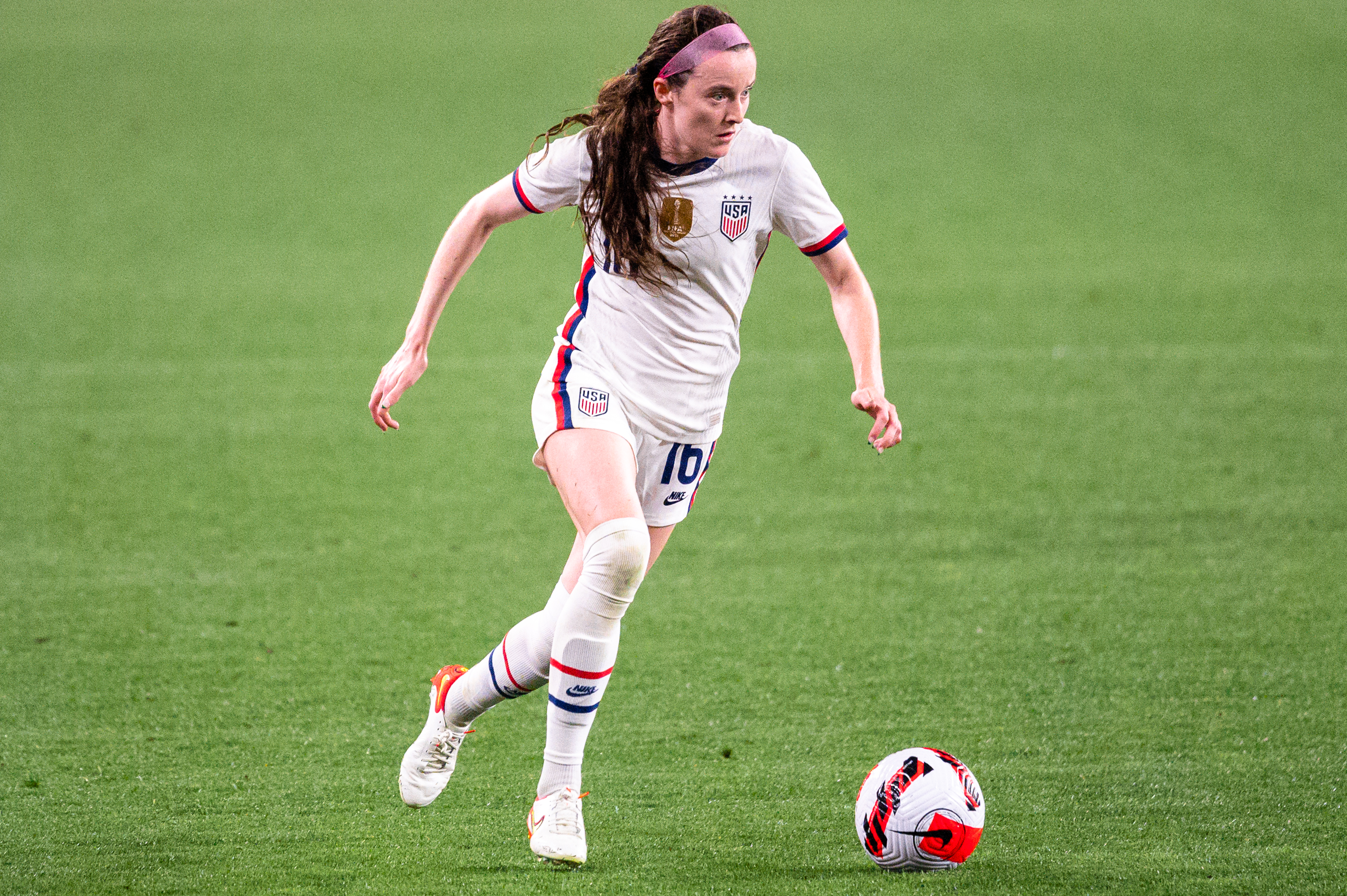
Lavelle in a friendly against Paraguay in September 2021

In July 2021, she was named to the roster for the delayed 2020 Tokyo Olympics. Lavelle appeared in all six games as the team won the bronze medal, losing to Canada 1–0 in the semi-final before beating Australia 4–3 in the third-place playoff. She scored one goal at the tournament, during a 6–1 group stage win over New Zealand.

=== 2023 FIFA Women's World Cup ===
Lavelle was named to the national team roster for the 2023 FIFA Women's World Cup, though she played limited minutes in the early stages of the tournament due to a knee injury. She appeared as a second-half substitute in the U.S.'s group stage matches against Vietnam and the Netherlands, earning one assist. She played all 90 minutes of the U.S.'s third group stage match but received a yellow card in the first half of the game; since she had also received a yellow card in the previous match, she was suspended from the team's Round of 16 game against Sweden. The U.S. ultimately lost to Sweden in a penalty shootout and was eliminated from the tournament.

=== 2024 Olympics ===
Lavelle was selected to the 18-player roster for the 2024 Summer Olympics in France. She started in every match with the exception being the gold medal match against Brazil, when she was an unused substitute. The United States defeated Brazil 1–0 in the final; the lone goal was scored by Mallory Swanson.

=== 2025 Player of the Year Season ===
After offseason ankle surgery, Lavelle's 2025 season was delayed for both club and country until June. She made her return to the USWNT on June 26 against Republic of Ireland and recorded an assist and goal in a 4–0 victory. It was Lavelle's first goal for the USWNT since January 2023. Lavelle had a goal involvement in all five matches she started for the national team in 2025. Her late push for the 2025 U.S. Soccer Female Player of the Year Award was bolstered by her NWSL championship run with Gotham FC, where she scored the lone goal in the November final. In January 2026, Lavelle was named the 2025 U.S. Soccer Female Player of the Year, often considered the highest accolade for an American soccer player.

== Personal life ==
Lavelle has a pet bulldog named Wilma Jean Wrinkles.

== In popular culture ==
=== Print media ===
Lavelle was featured on the July 2023 cover of Sports Illustrated along with national teammates Alex Morgan, Trinity Rodman, and Sophia Smith.

=== Television and film ===
Lavelle was featured in a television commercial for Visa Inc. in 2019. In 2020, Lavelle was featured in a commercial sponsored by Subway. Lavelle co-starred in a commercial for Icy Hot Dry Spray with Shaquille O'Neal and Sloane Stephens in 2021.

== Career statistics ==
=== Club ===
As of October 20, 2024

Appearances and goals by club, season and competition
Club	Season	League			National cup (Note: Includes FA Cup and NWSL Challenge Cup)		League Cup (Note: Includes NWSL Playoffs and FA League Cup)		Continental (Note: Includes UEFA Champions League & CONCACAF W Champions Cup)		Total	
Club	Season	Division	Apps	Goals	Apps	Goals	Apps	Goals	Apps	Goals	Apps	Goals
Boston Breakers	2017	NWSL	10	2	—		—		—		10	2
Washington Spirit	2018	NWSL	11	0	—		—		—		11	0
Washington Spirit	2019	NWSL	6	1	—		—		—		6	1
Washington Spirit	2020	NWSL	—		4	1	—		—		4	1
Washington Spirit	Total		27	3	4	1	0	0	0	0	31	4
Manchester City	2019–20	FA WSL	—		2	0	—		—		2	0
Manchester City	2020–21	FA WSL	16	1	2	2	2	2	4	0	24	5
Manchester City	Total		16	1	4	2	2	2	4	0	26	5
OL Reign	2021	NWSL	11	1	0	0	1	0	—		12	1
OL Reign	2022	NWSL	17	5	5	1	1	0	—		23	6
OL Reign	2023	NWSL	4	0	0	0	2	0	—		6	0
OL Reign	Total		32	6	5	1	4	0	0	0	41	7
Gotham FC	2024	NWSL	20	7	0	0	0	0	2	0	22	7
Gotham FC	2025	NWSL	15	4	0	0	0	0	0	0	15	4
Gotham FC	Total		35	11	0	0	0	0	2	0	35	11
Career total			95	17	13	4	6	2	6	0	120	23

=== International ===
As of match played October 13, 2026

Appearances and goals by national team and year
National team	Year	Apps	Goals
United States	2017	7	2
United States	2018	13	4
United States	2019	18	4
United States	2020	8	3
United States	2021	22	5
United States	2022	16	4
United States	2023	8	2
United States	2024	17	0
United States	2025	6	3
United States	2026	7	2
Total		124	29

As of match played April 11, 2026
Scores and results list the United States' goal tally first, score column indicates score after each Lavelle goal.

List of international goals scored by Rose Lavelle
No.	Date	Venue	Opponent	Score	Result	Competition	Ref.
1	April 9, 2017	BBVA Compass Stadium, Houston, United States	Russia	2–0	5–1	Friendly	
2	June 8, 2017	Gamla Ullevi, Gothenburg, Sweden	Sweden	1–0	1–0	Friendly	
3	August 2, 2018	Toyota Park, Chicago, United States	Brazil	1–1	4–1	2018 Tournament of Nations	
4	October 10, 2018	Sahlen's Stadium, Cary, United States	Trinidad and Tobago	2–0	7–0	2018 CONCACAF Championship	
5	October 10, 2018	Sahlen's Stadium, Cary, United States	Trinidad and Tobago	3–0	7–0	2018 CONCACAF Championship	
6	October 17, 2018	Toyota Stadium, Frisco, United States	Canada	1–0	2–0	2018 CONCACAF Championship	
7	May 16, 2019	Busch Stadium, St. Louis, United States	New Zealand	2–0	5–0	Friendly	
8	June 11, 2019	Stade Auguste-Delaune, Reims, France	Thailand	2–0	13–0	2019 FIFA World Cup	
9	June 11, 2019	Stade Auguste-Delaune, Reims, France	Thailand	7–0	13–0	2019 FIFA World Cup	
10	July 7, 2019	Parc Olympique Lyonnais, Décines-Charpieu, France	Netherlands	2–0	2–0	2019 FIFA World Cup	
11	January 31, 2020	BBVA Stadium, Houston, United States	Panama	4–0	8–0	2020 Olympic Qualifying	
12	February 7, 2020	Dignity Health Sports Park, Carson, United States	Mexico	2–0	4–0	2020 Olympic Qualifying	
13	November 27, 2020	Rat Verlegh Stadion, Breda, Netherlands	Netherlands	1–0	2–0	Friendly	
14	February 18, 2021	Exploria Stadium, Orlando, United States	Canada	1–0	1–0	2021 SheBelieves Cup	
15	July 24, 2021	Saitama Stadium 2002, Saitama, Japan	New Zealand	1–0	6–1	2020 Summer Olympics	
16	September 21, 2021	TQL Stadium, Cincinnati, United States	Paraguay	1–0	8–0	Friendly	
17	October 26, 2021	Allianz Field, St. Paul, United States	South Korea	5–0	6–0	Friendly	
18	November 27, 2021	Stadium Australia, Sydney, Australia	Australia	2–0	3–0	Friendly	
19	April 12, 2022	Subaru Park, Chester, Pennsylvania, United States	Uzbekistan	4–0	9–0	Friendly	
20	April 12, 2022	Subaru Park, Chester, Pennsylvania, United States	Uzbekistan	5–0	9–0	Friendly	
21	July 7, 2022	Estadio BBVA, Guadalupe, Mexico	Jamaica	3–0	5–0	2022 CONCACAF Championship	
22	September 6, 2022	Audi Field, Washington, D.C., United States	Nigeria	2–1	2–1	Friendly	
23	January 21, 2023	Eden Park, Auckland, New Zealand	New Zealand	2–0	5–0	Friendly	
24	January 21, 2023	Eden Park, Auckland, New Zealand	New Zealand	4–0	5–0	Friendly	
25	June 26, 2025	Dick's Sporting Goods Park, Commerce City, Colorado, United States	Republic of Ireland	3–0	4–0	Friendly	
26	October 23, 2025	Subaru Park, Chester, Pennsylvania, United States	Portugal	1–0	1–2	Friendly	
27	October 29, 2025	CPKC Stadium, Kansas City, Missouri, United States	New Zealand	3–0	6–0	Friendly	
28	April 11, 2026	PayPal Park, San Jose, California, United States	Japan	1–0	2–1	Friendly	
29	April 17, 2026	Dick's Sporting Goods Park, Commerce City, Colorado, United States	Japan	2–0	3–0	Friendly	

== Honors and awards ==
Wisconsin Badgers

- Big Ten Women's Soccer Tournament: 2014

Gotham FC

- NWSL Championship: 2025
- NWSL Shield: 2026
- NWSL Challenge Cup: 2026
- CONCACAF W Champions Cup: 2024–25

Manchester City

- Women's FA Cup: 2019–20

OL Reign

- NWSL Shield: 2022
- The Women's Cup: 2022

United States

- FIFA Women's World Cup: 2019
- Olympic Gold Medal: 2024
- Olympic Bronze Medal: 2020
- CONCACAF Women's Championship: 2018; 2022
- CONCACAF W Gold Cup: 2024
- CONCACAF Women's Olympic Qualifying Tournament: 2020
- Tournament of Nations: 2018
- SheBelieves Cup: 2020; 2021; 2022; 2023, 2026
- 100 international appearances: 2024

Individual

- Big Ten Freshman of the Year: 2013
- All-Big Ten Freshman Team: 2013
- First Team All-Big Ten: 2013, 2014, 2015, 2016
- Big Ten Midfielder of the Year: 2015, 2016
- NSCAA First Team All-American: 2015
- NSCAA Second Team All-American: 2014, 2016
- 2014 CONCACAF Women's U-20 Championship Golden Ball
- FIFA Women's World Cup Bronze Ball: 2019
- IFFHS Women's World Team: 2019
- ESPN FC Women's Rank: #44 on the 2024 list of 50 best women's soccer players 2024
- National Women's Soccer League Best XI: 2019
- National Women's Soccer League Second XI: 2022, 2024
- Best Player SheBelieves Cup: 2021
- CONCACAF W Championship Best XI: 2022
- Mount Notre Dame High School Athletic Hall of Fame Inductee: 2024
- NWSL Championship Most Valuable Player: 2025
- U.S. Soccer Player of the Year: 2025
- NWSL Best XI Second Team: 2026

== See also ==
- List of people from Cincinnati
- List of Keys to the City in the United States
- List of University of Wisconsin–Madison people in athletics
