= Pearl Drums =

Japanese percussion instrument company

Pearl Corporation
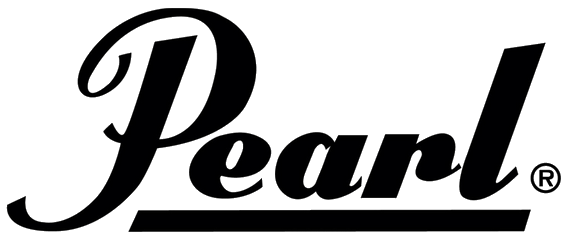
- Formerly: Pearl Industry, Ltd.
- Industry: Percussion instruments
- Founded: 2 April 1946; 80 years ago
- Founder: Katsumi Yanagisawa
- Headquarters: Yachiyo, Chiba, Japan
- Area served: Worldwide
- Key people: Katsumi Yanagisawa: Founder; Masakatsu Yanagisawa: President & CEO
- Products: Acoustic & Electronic drum kits Drum hardware Frame drums Cowbells; Congas; Bongos; Timbales; Djembes; Tamboras; Repiniques; Cuicas
- Parent: Pearl Musical Instrument Company
- Website: pearldrum.com

Pearl Musical Instrument Company (パール楽器製造株式会社, Pāru Gakki Seizō Kabushiki Gaisha), simply known as Pearl, is a multinational corporation based in Japan with a wide range of products, predominantly percussion instruments.

== History ==
Pearl was founded April 2, 1946, by Katsumi Yanagisawa, to manufacture music stands in Sumida, Tokyo. In 1950, Yanagisawa shifted his focus to the manufacturing of drums and named his company "Pearl Industry, Ltd."

By 1953, the company's name had been changed to "Pearl Musical Instrument Company," and manufacturing had expanded to include drum kits, marching drums, timpani, Latin percussion instruments, cymbals, stands, and accessories.

Yanagisawa's eldest son, Mitsuo, joined Pearl in 1957 and formed a division to export Pearl products worldwide. To meet increasing worldwide demand for drum kits following the advent of rock and roll music, in 1961 Pearl built a 15,000 sq ft (1,400 m^{2}) factory in Chiba, Japan, to produce inexpensive drum kits for other companies. Such instruments, known as stencils, bore the brand names of more than thirty distributors, such as Apollo, Coronet, Maxwin, CB-700, Stewart, Werco, Ideal, Crest, Revelle, Revere, Roxy, Lyra, Majestic, Silvertone, Toreador, Westbury, and Whitehall.

In 1966, Pearl introduced its first professional drum kit, the "President Series".

In the early 1970s, Pearl was distributed in the U.S. by Norlin, the parent company of Gibson guitars at the time.

Today, Pearl's Taiwanese operation encompasses five factories whose output supplies nearly the entire worldwide market for Pearl products. The original Chiba factory now caters to the domestic Japanese market, producing drum kits, marching drums, timpani, and symphonic chimes. The company also produces drums in Zhejiang, China.

Adams Musical Instruments are sold in the U.S. through Pearl dealers, Hughes and Kettner guitar and bass amplifiers are distributed through Pearl's main warehouse in Nashville, Tennessee and Sabian cymbals are distributed in Japan through Pearl dealers.

Pearl created several drum products, such as shells in the 1970s that were made of wood with a fiber-glass lining and ones made of a composite called "Phenolic." Additionally, Pearl combined roto-toms and these Phenolic shells to create the Vari-Pitch line of drums. Other early innovations included shells that were slightly undersized, so that the drum head would extend over the edges, much like on a gong drum. Pearl manufactured seamless, extruded acrylic shells that were different from the tabbed-and-seamed Vistalite shells used by Ludwig. Pearl also developed the hinged tube tom-arm, a design widely copied by many other drum manufacturers.

== Construction ==
Pearl has made shells for more than 30 companies. In the 1960s, they ceased making shells for other companies and began offering drums under their own name, using the Pearl logo for the first time.

Their construction technique is known as SST or "Superior Shell Technology." All Pearl drums feature this construction. Each ply is placed into a cylinder, and pressure is applied from both sides. While in the press, the shell is heated to bring the glue to a boil, thus forcing the glue through the wood grain and fusing the shells very tightly. The individual plies are scarf jointed, and all the seams are offset, resulting in a "seamless" drum (Pearl demonstrates the strength by parking a Humvee with its tire on a tom shell). This creates a drum shell of incredible strength.

== Drum lines ==
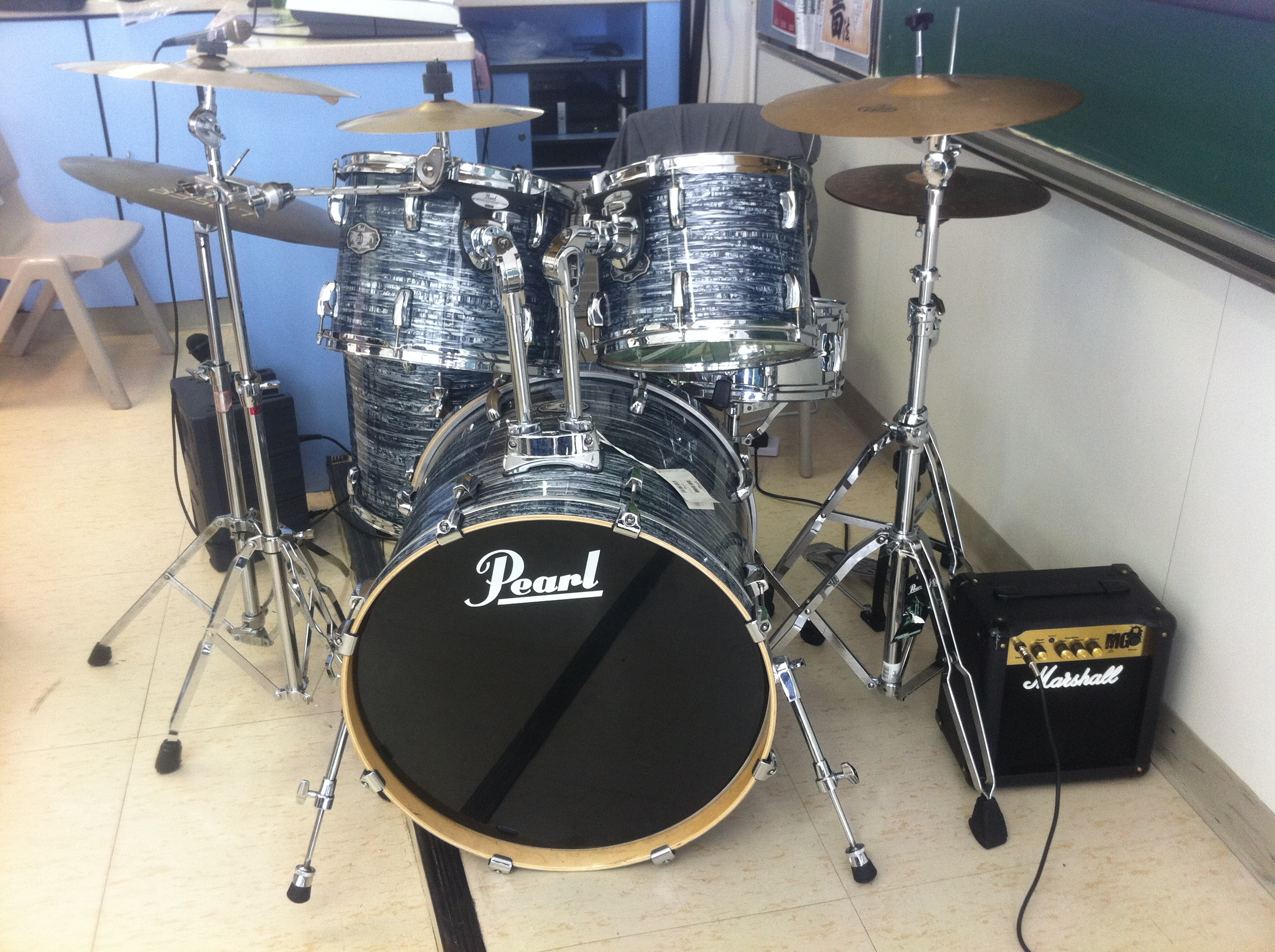
Drum kit

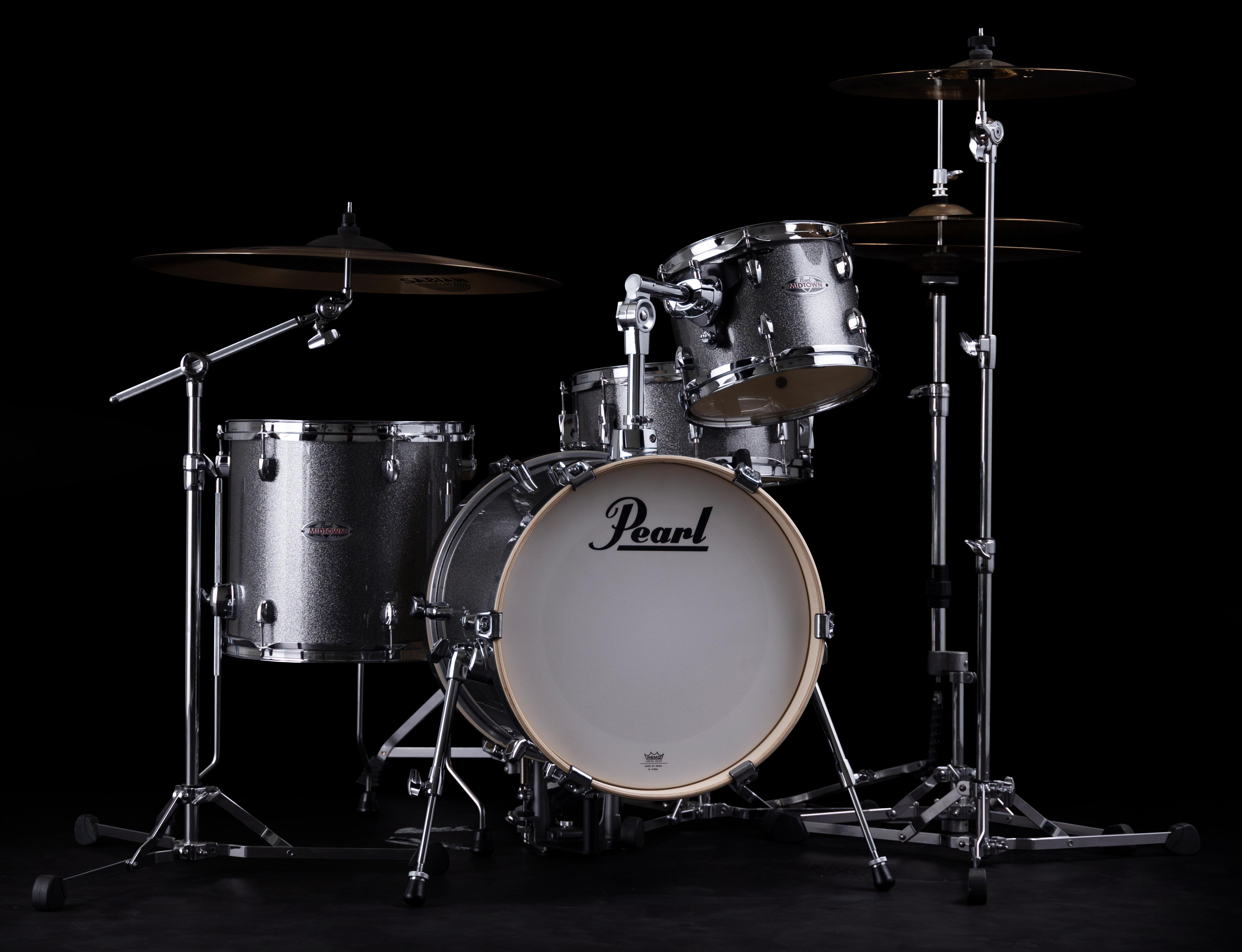
Pearl Midtown Compact drum kit in Grindstone Sparkle

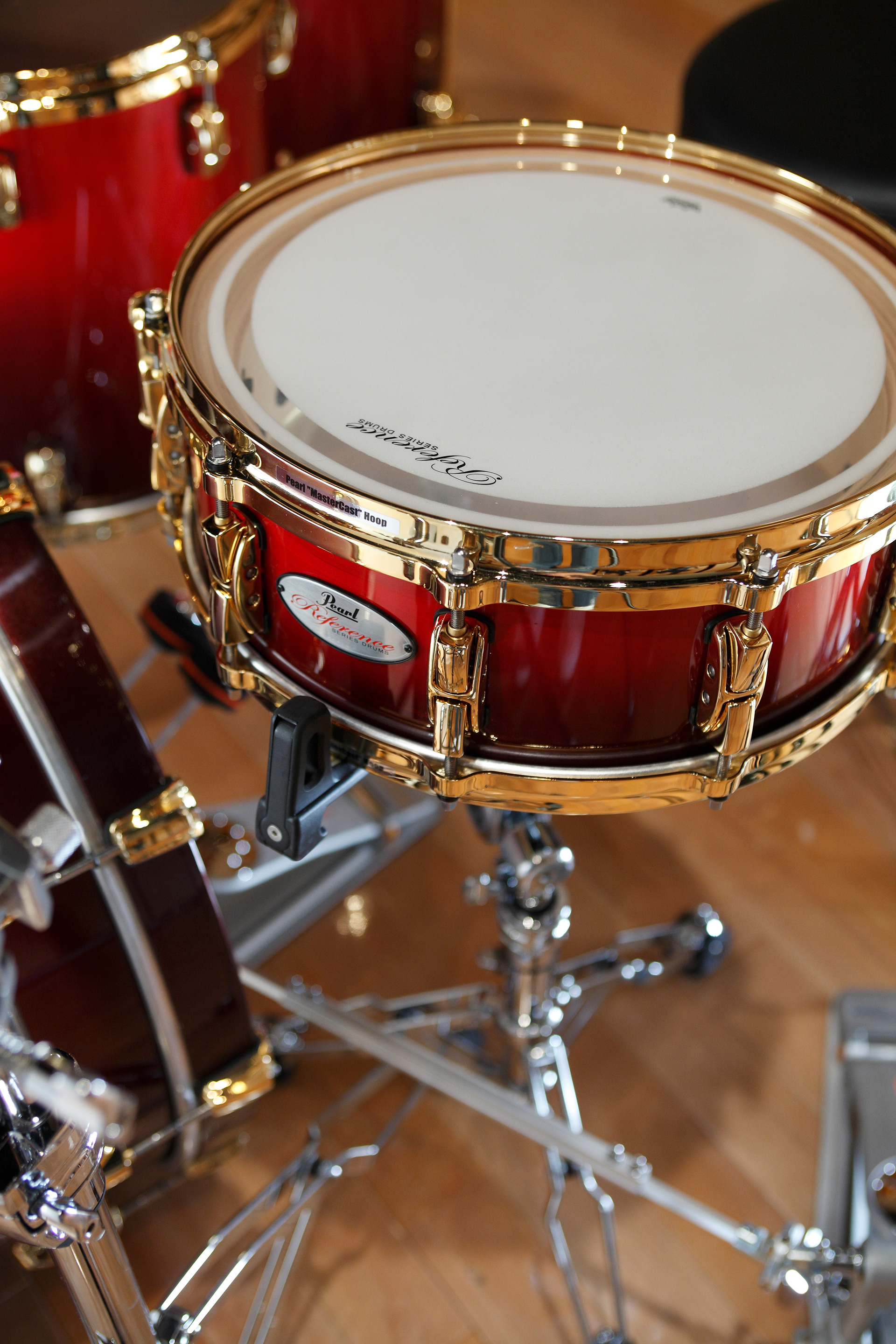
Pearl Reference Snare drum in Scarlet Fade

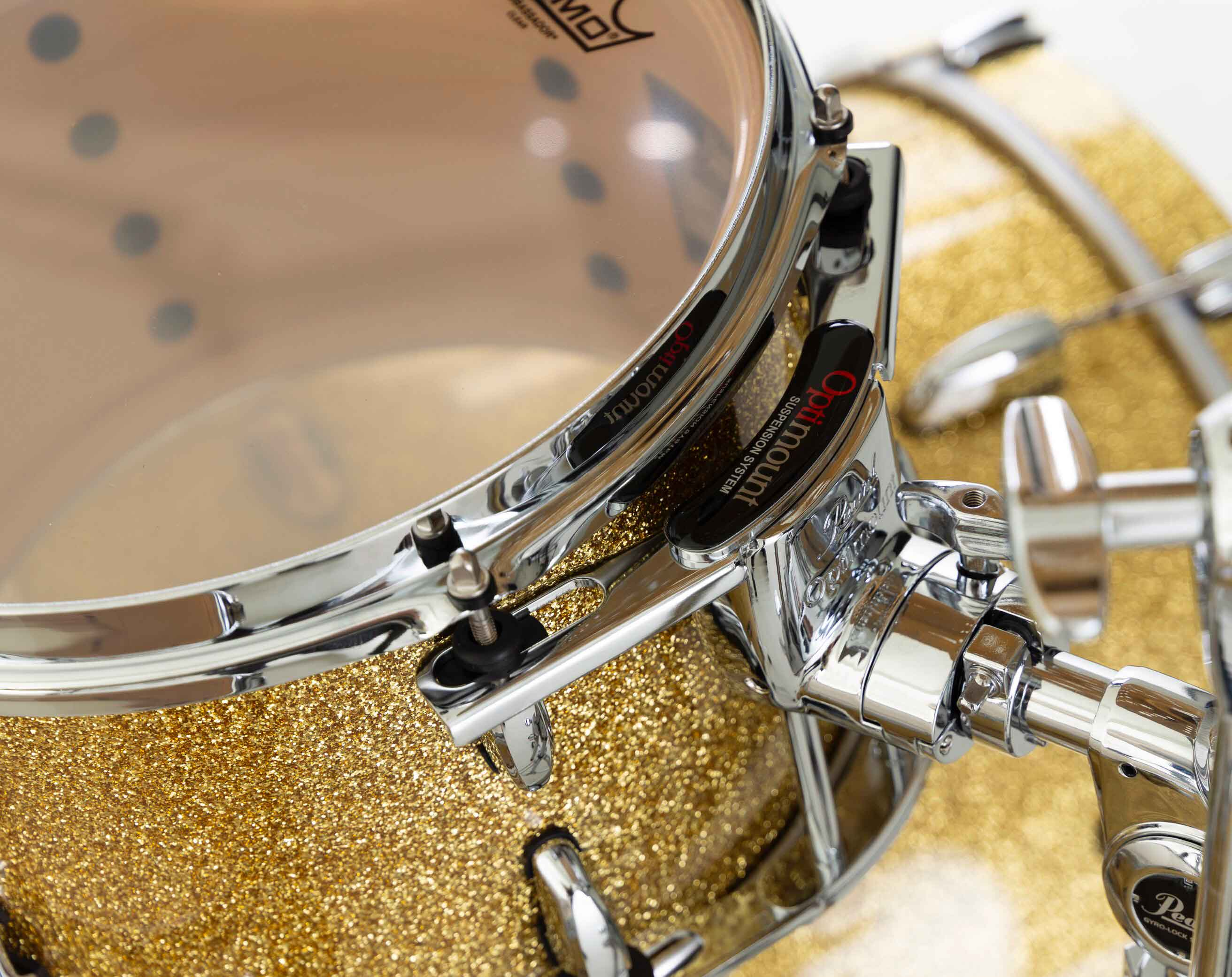
Opti-Mount Suspension System

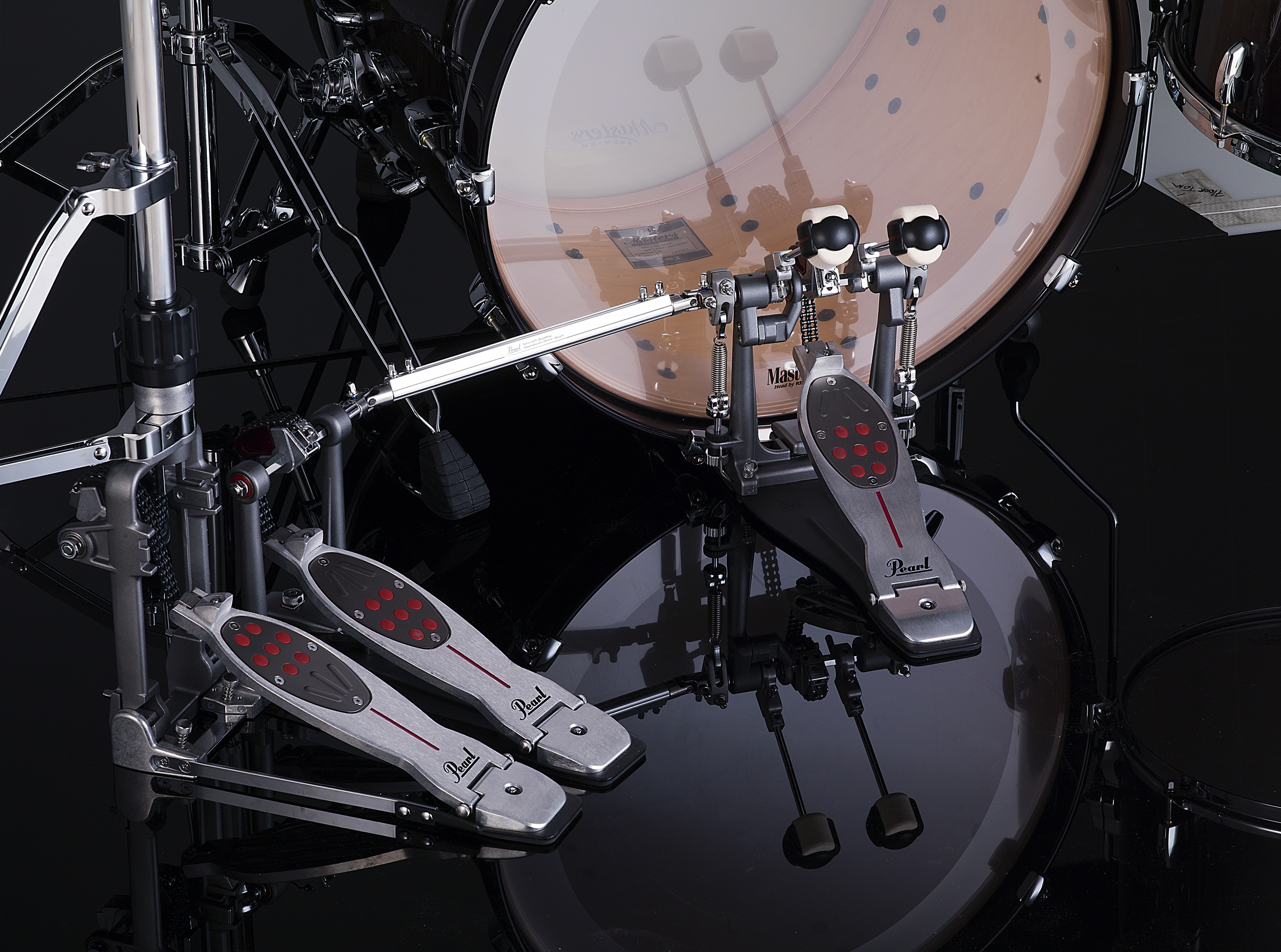
Pearl Eliminator Redline pedals P2050C

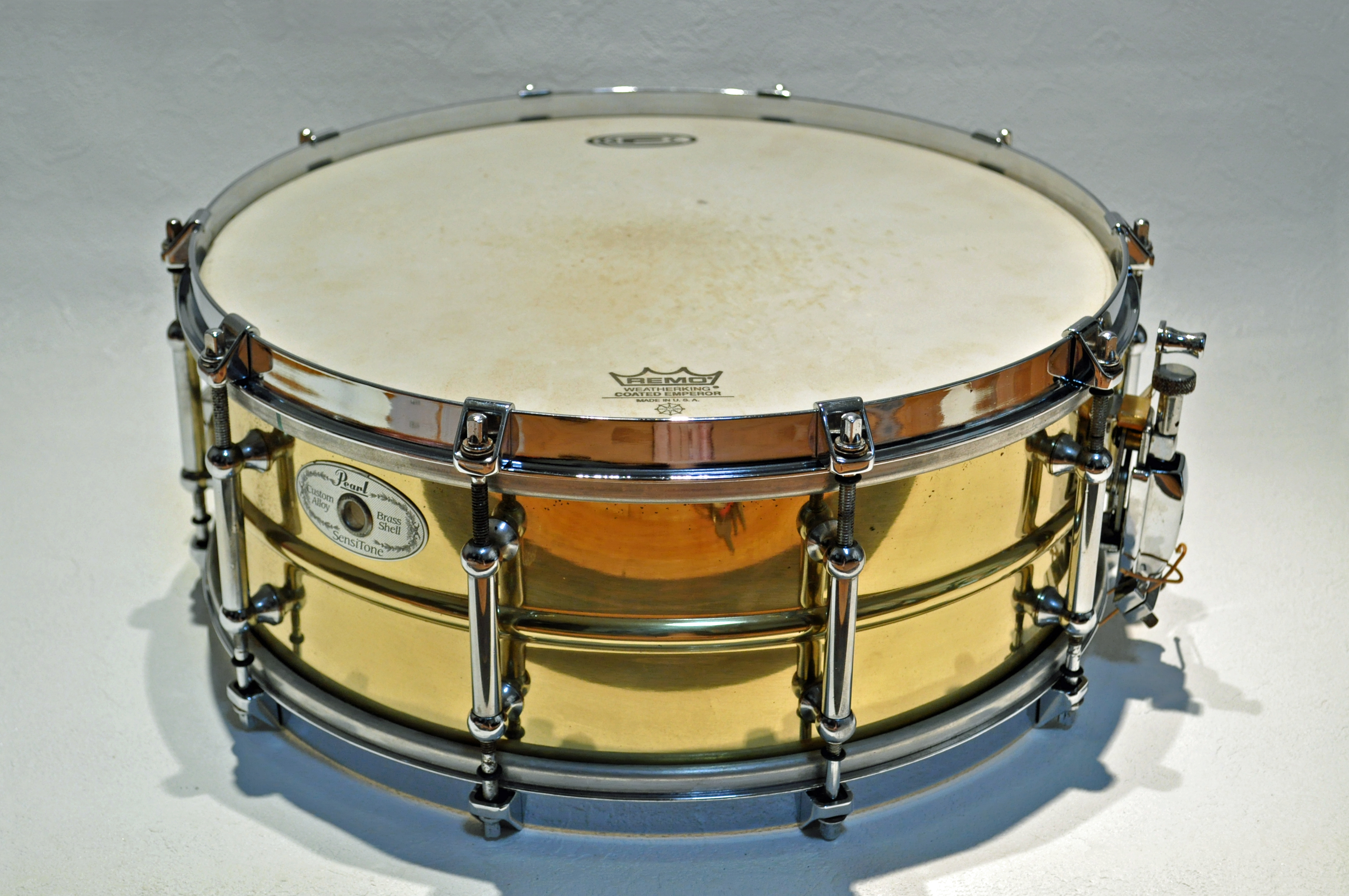
SensiTone classic 2 brass shell 14'5 snare drum

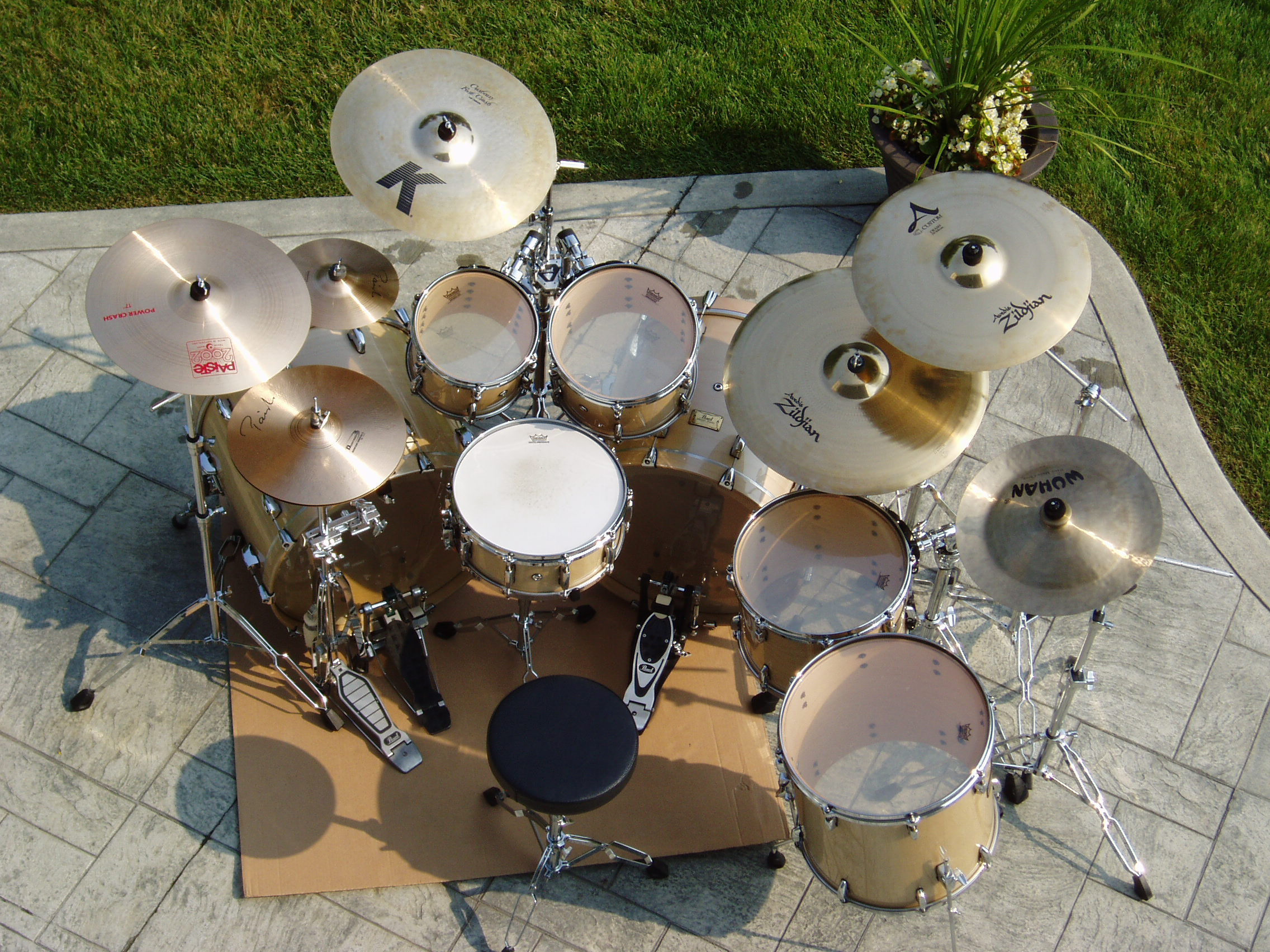
Drum kit

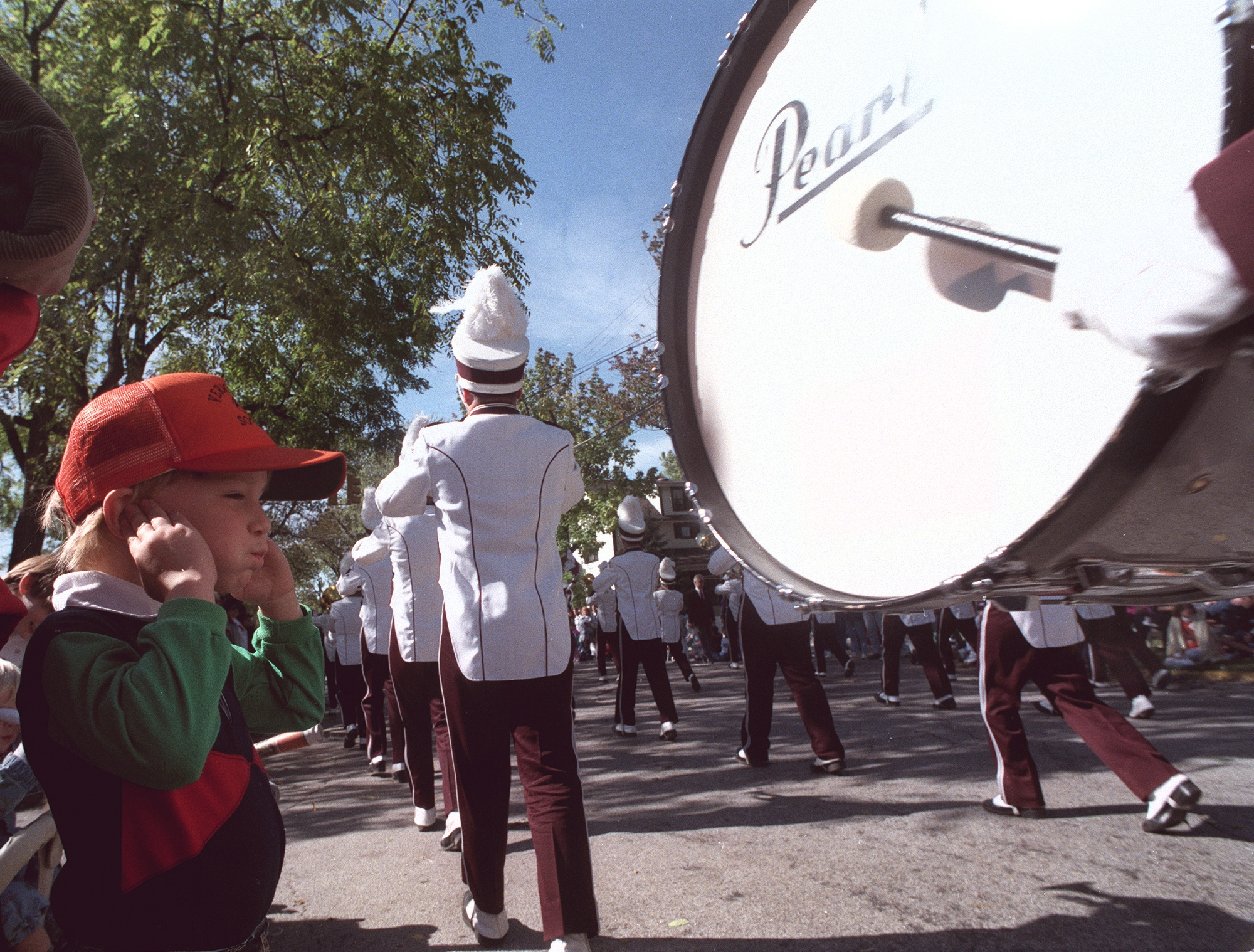
Bass drum of a marching band in Ohio

=== Beginner and semi-professional lines ===
- Midtown (MDT) - a compact 4-piece poplar drum kit which consists of a 16x14 bass drum, a 10x7 tom, a 13x12 floor tom, and a 13x5.5 snare.
- Roadshow (RS) - a 5-piece drum set with a 9-ply Poplar shell. This kit is made for beginners. A throne, a Dual Chain drive pedal, cymbals (16“ Crash-Ride Cymbal, 14" Hybrid Brass/Hi-Hats), Maple Drum Sticks (2 pr) and a Professional Stick Bag are also included.
- Export (EXX) - introduced at Winter NAMM 2013, the EXX is Pearl's reintroduction to the Export line in less than a decade. This is the best selling drum set of all time. Designed to replace the Forum series, these drums are made from Poplar and Asian Mahogany shells and feature Pearl's "Opti-Loc" suspension mounts.
- Export (EXL) - essentially the same as Export EXX but with a Lacquer finish.
- Decade Maple (DMP) - all maple drum kit with an affordable price tag. Pearl Decade Maple features a thin 6ply/5.4mm Maple Shell, an Opti-Loc mounting system and low mass/low contact hardware.

=== Professional lines ===
- Crystal Beat (CRB) - seamless acrylic drum set reintroduced at NAMM Summer Session 2014. Originally the first Crystal Beat was launched in 1973 and featured 'Sonaglass' - Pearl's acrylic shell equivalent. Crystal Beat's revolutionary seamless construction was molded - not rolled - creating a strong acrylic drum system that could stand up to the rigors of touring. The updated version features several modern changes: Optimount suspension system, 1.6mm triple-flanged hoops and a new acrylic material.
- Session Studio Select (STS) – Introduced at Winter NAMM 2018, the Session Studio Select kit replaced the discontinued Session Studio Classic. These drums feature Birch/African Mahogany shells, 60-degree bearing edge, SuperHoop ll and crafted for studio recordings.
- Pearl Masters Maple Complete (MCT) - Designed to replace Pearl MCX, this drum series features all Maple shell.
- Pearl Masters Maple Gum (MMG) - Released in 2019 at Winter NAMM, Pearl Masters Maple Gum series is a simplified version of the Masterworks (MW) Sonic Select: Studio Recipe but with limited options of finishes and configurations. The shell consists of the premium North American Maple and Gum wood with 60-degree edges.
- Pearl Masters Maple Reserve (MRV) - Professional drum series featuring the original Masters series shell formula. The shell consists of 4-ply(5mm) 100% Maple with 4-ply Maple Re-Rings. Besides stock finishes, there are also more than 40 special order colours.
- Reference Pure (RP) – New for 2011, the Reference Pure series features the same wood blend as the original Reference series, but with thinner shells (each ply .9mm thick), new "Fat Tone" hoops, and Masters Premium-style swivel tube lugs, all of which are designed to reduce the overall weight of the kit and to create a more open, resonant sound.
- Reference (RF) - Pearl's professional drum line made from blended wood types (Maple, Birch and African mahogany). They are the highest quality that Pearl offers that are not custom-made. The drums come in a wide array of finishes with chrome, black or gold-plated hardware. This series is also made in Taiwan, and are readily available for order in red wine color. All other colors still may take up to six months for order.
- Masterworks (MW) – Pearl's flagship drum line. Everything, including the plies of wood (such as mahogany, maple, birch, and carbon fiber/maple), style and finish of hardware (chrome, 24k gold, black), and finish can be selected by the customer. For an added cost, Masterworks drums can be ordered with an exotic wood outer ply (such as tamo or bubinga), which enhances the finish. All of the drums are handmade, and because of this, delivery times can take up to six months and even a full year.

=== Electronic drums ===
- e/Merge - high-end electronic drum kit developed in partnership with Korg. The kit comes with a full library of acoustic Pearl drums together with Korg's library of electronic and orchestral quality samples percussion sounds. Also featuring Pearl PUREtouch Pad aimed at creating a true acoustic-like pad experience.
- Mimic Pro - Introduced at NAMM Summer Session 2016 this drum module features actual VST layered sounds from Steven Slate Drum (SSD5) library. It is also the first drum module to implement a 7” IPS touch screen.
- SY1 Syncussion- Released in 1979, this was the forerunner to the Simmons SDSV. It offered two completely independent (and identical) channels which were typically triggered from two bongo-like drums fitted with transducers. They could be triggered from almost anything including an old synth with a gate output or, indeed, the trigger outputs of a drum machine. It was capable of producing electronic drum and percussion sounds and sound effects. Discontinued.
- DRX 1 - Was the next model Pearl brought out, similar to the Simmons kits The kits came with five trigger pads consisting of a bass drum trigger and four snare/tom triggers; and an electronic brain controller module. Also using rubber pads which were softer for better rebound. Later on they bought out a restyled version named Pearl Drum X, the last version was the Syncussion X, this was radically different using full analogue and electronic sounds. Discontinued.
- ePro Live - Pearl's first electronic kit that included real drums made from poplar shells. The drum pads can be replaced with traditional drum heads and can be played as an acoustic drum kit. They are available in two finishes, Jet Black and Pearl's new Artisan II finish, Quilted Maple Fade. Pearl's "EPC2" plastic cymbals or real brass E-Classic electronic cymbals (designed by Smartrigger Electronic Cymbals) are available. The kit's drum module, Pearl's R.E.D.(Real Electronic Drums) box, includes acoustic and vintage drums, electronics from beat machines to modern digital, and a variety of orchestral, concert and world percussion instruments. Discontinued.

=== Discontinued acoustic drums ===
- Forum – Drums made with 6 plies (7.5mm) of Poplar in wrap finishes. Forum drums include Pearl's CXP cymbals, Vic Firth drumsticks, an instructional DVD, and Pearl's 890 Series hardware as standard equipment. In January 2008, the Forum line received an upgrade to the Forum FZ - featuring upgrades like ISS tom mounts. These are made in China. The Forum line was replaced by the new Export line in 2013.
- Target - Pearl's entry-level kit. These drums are made from 9 plies of mahogany.
- SoundCheck - Pearl's entry-level kit. These drums are made from 9 plies of mahogany and are finished in a durable high-gloss covering. Despite its discontinuation, it is still available for purchase at some music shops, such as Guitar Center.
- Export (EX, ELX, EXR, and ECX) - Pearl's most popular series of drum kits, and the most popular set ever sold (the one millionth Export kit was produced in 1995). The first generation of Export drums were made of 9-ply Philippine mahogany, and the newer were made with 6 plies (7.5mm) of Poplar, with the ECX series being made from maple, and come standard with Pearl's ISS tom mounting system. They were discontinued and replaced by the Vision series (VMX - 6ply maple, VBX - birch, VSX, VX) and later reintroduced in 2013 (as the EXX) to replace the Forum line.
- Session - The successor of the World Series, Prestige Session Elite (SLX), Prestige Session (lacquered) and Performance Session (covered) were introduced in 1991. The shells were 7-ply, 7.5mm: One inner ply of birch, one outer ply of birch, and five middle plies of mahogany. Toms had Superhoops. Rack toms had I.S.S. Mounts. Prestige Session and Performance Session still retained the WLX designation and came with traditional double lugs, while SLX had high tension lugs and came with better hardware. In 1994, the SLX became the SPX Prestige Session (lacquered) and SX Session (wrapped) Series. The SX shells were 8 ply Mahogany and Laminate while the SPX shells were 7 ply birch and mahogany. In 1997 SRX Prestige Session Select replaced SPX and SX line. The shells were 7 ply maple and mahogany. In 2001 SRX Prestige Session Select became the SRX Session Custom, 6-ply all-maple shells with the OptiMount suspension system and 2.3mm SuperHoops II. In 2004 SRX became the SMX Session Custom 6 ply 100% maple series, and SBX Session Custom all birch. Sessions were discontinued in 2006 to make way for Vision series and MCX Masters Custom in 2007. These drums were extremely popular, but expensive. The Session line was later reintroduced in 2012 as the Session Studio Classic.
- Masters - Masters series became available on the market in 1993, and included sets made of maple and birch, as follows: Masters Custom MMX (4-ply, 5mm maple shells with reinforcement rings), Masters Custom Extra CMX (6-ply, 7.5mm maple), Masters Studio MBX (4-ply birch with reinforcement rings), Masters Studio Extra CBX (6-ply, 7.5mm birch). In 1997 Masters Mahogany Classic MHX with 4-ply, 5mm African Mahogany shells and 4-ply, 5mm maple reinforcement rings was introduced. In the same year CMX was renamed Masters Custom Extra MRX, while Masters Studio Birch MBX was discontinued. In 1999, BRX Masters with 6-ply, 7.5mm birch shells was introduced. In 2003, Masters RetroSpec MSX, with 6-ply, 7.5mm maple shells in a retro-style Delmar covering was introduced and ran until the beginning of 2007. In 2006, Masters Studio BSX 6 ply birch "glass", with 6 ply, 7.5mm birch shells, in a Delmar glass covering imbedded with real glass flakes was introduced. In 2007, Masters series was simplified into two lines: Masters MCX and Masters Premium. The first Masters kits from 1993 had 1.6mm steel hoops, the same as Export. In 1994, they were switched to 2mm steel (gold plated) and 2mm stainless steel. In 1996, they were switched to 2mm steel. In 1997, they were switched to 2.3mm SuperHoop II's. In 1999, they were switched to die cast. Most of their finishes are now available on their Masters Premium and Reference series drums.
- MX, MLX & BLX - The predecessor of the original Masters series, with the MX being a wrapped 6ply (7.5mm) maple kit, and the MLX and BLX being lacquered 6ply (7.5mm) Maple and Birch Kits respectively. Included 2.3mm Superhoops, through-shell mounting and often came with a free-floating snare.
- GLX - This kit was the high end of Pearl from 85 to 88. Made with maple, the Pearl Prestige Artist 9500 a.k.a. GLX shared the same specs as MLX except it also included a very unique lugs system called "Super Gripper". They were a notched release type lug casing, loosen the rod a bit and the casing pops off the release the nut so the rods don't leave the rims.
- DX & DLX - Introduced in 1984, they were professional line of drums, placed just below MLX and BLX series, and featured high-end components such as double braced hardware and SuperHoops. DX (Studio 7300) were available in a wrapped finish, and the DLX (Prestige Studio 7500) were available in a lacquered finish. Shells were 7-ply: 1 ply birch, 5 alternating plies of mahogany and lamin wood and 1 ply birch. This series were made in Japan. In 1987, the DX/DLX were discontinued and replaced by the WX/WLX. From 1997 to 1998, the DX Session (covered finishes) and DLX Prestige Session (lacquer finishes) made a brief “comeback” and featured 7 ply, 7.5mm shells constructed of maple (inside), mahogany (middle) and maple (inside). Prestige Session and Session featured the same shell construction as Pearl Session Select (SRX), but SRX came with I.S.S. mounts, better hardware and 4 more finishes. The Prestige Session and Session came with 5.5" deep SensiTone Steel snare drum, while the Prestige Session Select came with 6.5" deep SensiTone Steel snare drum. In 1999, they were replaced by the all maple SMX and birch SBX.
- World Series (WLX/WX) - The World Series was introduced in 1986. They were placed between the Export and DX/DLX kits, and the only differences were tom arms (Worlds came with the TH-80 Tom Holders, whereas the higher series had TH-90 tom holders), and the DX/DLX had super hoops (V1). In 1987, World series replaced DX/DLX series. Shells were 8 ply shells - 2 inner plies were linden, 5 plies mahogany, and 1 outer ply birch. Later shells (from 1989) were 7-ply birch/mahogany. They came in both wrapped (Performance World WX 6500) and lacquered (Prestige World WLX 6500) models. Eventually in 1990 after running side by side with the SLX (Pretige Session Elite) the World Series was renamed the Prestige (WLX) and Performance (WX) Session Series. These 2 models shared the exact same shells the differences being the snare drum, 1 colour option and the SLX had the high tension lugs. Jazz series, the Prestige Session Jazz retained the WLX designation.
- Custom Z - Drums made from maple (CZX) or birch (SZX), 8ply (10mm) snares and rack toms, 10ply (12.5mm) floor toms and kick drums. The CZX was introduced in 1989, and discontinued in 1994. Initially, in 1989, the only finish available was #300 Champagne lacquer, however, by 1993, the last year of production, #110 Sequoia Red, #113 Sheer Blue, #103 Piano Black, and #109 Arctic White were also available. Toms were available in square sizes (12x12, 13x13, etc.) and power sizes (12x10, 13x11, etc.). Bass drums were available in 16" and 18" depths. All featured high-tension lug casings with brass swivel nuts. In the final year of production, some CZX kits were offered with "virgin" shells (no BT2 tom mounts or BB3 bass drum mounts). In 1991, the CZX Studio Series, also known as the SZX, was introduced. The SZX featured 100% birch shells in the same thickness as the CZX. Tom sizes, however, were limited to power sizes and bass drums were only available in 16" depth. The SZX was available in #131 Midnight Quartz, #133 Crimson Quartz #110 Sequoia Red, #113 Sheer Blue, #103 Piano Black, and #109 Arctic White. 1993 was the last year of production for the SZX.
- CenterStage – Entry-level kit; replaces Forum line. Nine-ply aged mahogany shells. Available in jet black or wine red wrapped finish. Retails for $399 for full kit including hardware (no cymbals).
- Masters Premium – The successor to the Masters Series drums, featured upgraded Reference OptiMounts, spurs, and floor tom legs and brackets, and was available in the following configurations: MMP (4 ply, 5mm maple shells with 4 ply, 5mm reinforcement rings), BMP (4 ply, 5mm birch shells with 4 ply, 5mm birch reinforcement rings), MRP (6 ply, 7.5mm maple shells), and BRP (6 ply, 7.5mm birch shells). All series offer the choice of either chrome, black chrome, or gold hardware. In 2009, MHP Masters Mahogany LE 4-ply African Mahogany with 4-ply maple reinforcement rings was introduced. The line was discontinued in the U.S. in favor of the less expensive MCX series, but continues to be sold in Japan and Europe. However, it can still be ordered as a "special order" in the North American market.
- Masters Premium Legend (MPL) – Introduced at the 2011 Musikmesse music fair, the Legend Series incorporates most of the features found in the Reference Pure series such as Fat Tone hoops, thinner shells, and lightweight swivel tube lugs (snares only), all of which are designed to reduce the kit's weight. Unlike the Masters Premium line, these drums are only made from maple, with the choice of 5,4 mm. These drums are available only in Europe.
- Session Studio Classic (SSC) – Introduced at Winter NAMM 2012, the Session Studio Classic line reintroduces the Session Series for the first time in five years. These drums are made 6 plies of birch and kapur (referred to Pearl as their "Session Formula" shells), and feature Remo drum heads (Pinstripe on the toms, Powerstroke 3 heads on the bass drums), OptiMount tom mounts, and SuperHoop II hoops. These drums are made in Taiwan.
- Masters Custom (MCX/BCX) - Drums made from 6 plies of maple and birch. These drums replace the entire Session and Masters Premium lines until the introduction of the Session Studio Classic, with the only difference being that they feature die-cast hoops, Masters Series lugs, Masters Series OptiMount tom mounts, and Remo drum heads. They are the same configuration as the Masters Premium MRP kits, but they only come in 5 finishes with bright chrome being the only hardware option. As a result, the drums are not made up as a "custom" stock. Since they are warehoused in large quantities, time between order and delivery are much shorter. These are made in Taiwan.

== Limited edition ==
Over the years, Pearl has released a number of limited edition kits, normally special versions of existing lines:

- Pearl Export EXA in Teal Blue Ash - Introduced in April 2019 this 6-piece shell pack consists of a 22x18 Bass drum, 10x7 and 12x8 toms, 16x16, 14x14 Floor toms, and a 14x5.5 snare drum.
- Redline - Reference kits available in either solid black or solid white with matching lugs and hoops. True to its name, the rubber gaskets on the lugs and bass drum claws were dyed red. The kits came in different size shellpacks in rock-styled configurations. The Redline series were released in the US in 2008 and in Europe (as a Masters Premium kit) at the Musikmesse later that year.
- 50th Anniversary - Masters Series drums made from birch with reinforcement hoops and 24-karat gold-plated lugs. 30 kits—10 in Wine Red, 10 in Black Mist, and 10 in Emerald Mist—were made and were not sold in the US except for the Anniversary style snares, though they differ from the snare drums that came with the Anniversary kits (The single snares were single-ply with vintage lugs and hoops).
- Chad Smith & Joey Jordison limited edition - Released as an Export shell pack, the Joey Jordison kits consisted of a double bass setup and comes with a Joey Jordison signature snare, while the Chad Smith kits are made in a rock setup and comes with a Chad Smith signature snare. These kits were later rereleased in 2008 as a Forum drum kit.
- Mahogany - Drums constructed from African Mahogany.

== Snare drums ==
As well as drum kits, Pearl is a renowned producer of snare drums. Low-end kits (Vision series and lower) come standard with snare drums, and higher-end series have snares which must be bought separately. Individual snares, as well as artists' signature snares, are also available.

=== Series snare drums ===
- Soundcheck - Comes with matching 14"x5.5" snare as standard equipment.
- Export (EXX) - Comes with matching 14"x5.5" snare as standard equipment.
- Masters - Available in all Masters lines and finishes. Ordered separately from kits.
- Reference - 20-ply wood snares are available in 14"x5", 14"x6.5" and 13"x6.5" sizes. They utilize the same mixed wood technology as other Reference drums, with 6 inner plies of birch and 14 outer plies of maple with a 45° bearing edge. Metal Reference snares are also available, with shells made from either steel and brass. Both metal snares are available in 14"x5" and 14"x6.5" sizes.
- Masterworks - Masterworks snares can be custom-ordered with a kit, or as a separate item. They are available in a wide range of materials, sizes and finishes.
- StaveCraft - The shells are made of Thai Oak or Makha staves and are 25mm thick. The Dado-Loc joint increases a total shell strength of 50%. Both snares are available in 14"x5" and 14"x6.5" sizes.

=== Individual snare drums ===
- SensiTone Elite - Snares produced from five metals: steel, stainless steel, brass, phosphor bronze and aluminium. All are available in 14"x5" and 14"x6.5" sizes. In 2011, the stainless steel, bronze, and aluminum models were discontinued, leaving the brass and steel models the only models in its lineup.
- UltraCast - Drums made from 3mm cast aluminum. Available in 14x5 and 14x6.5 sizes.
- Free-Floating - Pearl's Free-Floating snares removes all hardware from the shell, allowing the player to change the shell as easily as a head. The throw-off, lugs and other hardware are part of the special edge ring which holds the drum and heads together. Available in copper, brass, steel, aluminium and maple with shell depths of 3.5", 5", 6.5" and 8". In 2011, the copper and brass models, as well as the 8" shell depth, were discontinued. Also the aluminium shells were discontinued.
- Symphonic - Made from 6 ply, 7.5mm thick maple, for concert-quality snare drums. The throw-off features three separate strainers for thin cables, heavy cables and snare wires, allowing a variety of sounds.
- Firecracker - Snares made from 8-ply Poplar or 1mm steel shells. They are available in 10" and 12" sizes, both with a 5" depth.
- Effects - Effects snares includes the 10"x6" Maple Popcorn snare as well as piccolo snares. All are designed to create sounds not found in standard snare drum sizes.

=== Discontinued snare drums ===
- Soundcheck - Comes with matching 14"x5.5" snare as standard equipment.
- Forum - Comes with matching 14"x5.5" snare as standard equipment. (Discontinued and replaced with the new Export series)
- Vision - VX, VSX, VLX and VBX lines come with a steel SensiTone snare, while the VMX line comes with a matching maple snare. For 2011, the VB, VBA, and VMA lines come with a matching wood snare, while the VBL line comes with a steel SensiTone snare.
- Utility - Fusing reliability and flexibility for today's demanding gigging environment, Pearl has developed Modern Utility: a line of no-nonsense, well-appointed snare drums priced with the active working player in mind. Vital instruments tailored to make the gig great, Modern Utility's five snare models each feature a 6-ply/5 mm all Maple SST shell. Well-appointed with our CL Bridge Lug and smooth SR700 strainer, each Modern Utility snare is priced to allow the active working player an expanded voice, is flexible enough to add to any set-up, and strong enough to stand up to constant play.

== Hardware and pedals ==
In addition to producing drums, Pearl has also produced hardware for its drum and percussion instruments as well as pedals. One of Pearl's major improvements was the introduction of the Uni-Lock tilter on their tom mounts and cymbal stands. Introduced in 1982, the Uni-Lock tilter uses a frictionless, gearless tilter, allowing the player to make more precise angle adjustments to their toms and cymbals. This was further improved with the introduction of the Gyro-Lock tilters which rotate a full 360 degrees. Most of Pearl's pedals come equipped with PowerShifter heel plates, which allow the player to adjust the pedal's feel by sliding the plate either forwards or backwards.

=== Hardware ===
- 700 Series - Pearl's low-end line of hardware featuring gear tilters and double-braced legs. These come standard on Forum kits. Replaced by the 830 Series in 2013.
- 900 Series/930 Series - Introduced in 2009, the 900 Series is Pearl's mid-ranged line of hardware featuring Uni-Lock tilters. 900 Series hardware come standard on Vision series kits. For 2013, the 930 Series was released, being the updated version of the 900 Series
- 1000 Series/2000 Series - Pearl's high-end lines of drum hardware. 1000 Series hardware come equipped with upgraded Uni-Lock tilters, while 2000 Series hardware are equipped with Pearl's Gyro-Lock tilters. For 2013, the 1030 and 2030 Series were released, being upgraded versions of the 1000 and 2000 series respectively.

=== Pedals ===
- 830 Series (830 Series) - Pearl's entry-level line of pedals. Introduced in 2014, it borrows many features from the Demon lines including Demon Style Longboard and design (without any color), Perfect Circle Cam and DuoBeat Beater.
- 930 Series - Pearl's mid-level line of pedals. These pedals succeed the 900 and 120 series. For 2013, the 930 Series line of pedals (also known as the Demonator line) was introduced, borrowing many features from the Eliminator and Demon lines.
- Eliminator (2000 Series) - Pearl's mid-ranged line of pedals and the most versatile line of pedals in Pearl's lineup. Eliminator pedals feature Pearl's patented QuadBeater which allow the player to choose between four distinct sounds, six interchangeable cams which affects the pedal's feel and response, and a customizable traction plate. For 2012, the Eliminator II (2100 series) line of pedals were introduced by Pearl Japan, sporting features from the Demon series such as Ninja bearings, Z-link universal joints (limited edition only), and the Control Core beater, and bridges the gap between the Eliminator and Eliminator Demon lines. The Eliminator II is currently only sold in Japan. For 2016, the Eliminator Redline (2050 series) line of pedals was released as an upgrade to the old Eliminator 2000 series.
- Eliminator Demon (3000 Series) - Pearl's high-end line of pedals. Introduced in 2009, the Demon Drive pedals come equipped with direct drive links, micro-polished bearings (courtesy of Ninja Skateboards), and a "Duo-Deck" footboard which allow the player to switch between short and longboard pedals. For 2012, the Demon Chain pedal was introduced, incorporating the same features as its direct drive counterpart, but with a lightweight chain and "Perfect Circle" cam.

== See also ==
- List of drum makers
