= Dealkalization =

Dealkalization is a process of surface modification applicable to glasses containing alkali ions, wherein a thin surface layer is created that has a lower concentration of alkali ions than is present in the underlying, bulk glass. This change in surface composition commonly alters the observed properties of the surface, most notably enhancing corrosion resistance.

Many commercial glass products such as containers are made of soda-lime glass, and therefore have a substantial percentage of sodium ions in their internal structure. Since sodium is an alkali element, its selective removal from the surface results in a dealkalized surface. A classic example of dealkalization is the treatment of glass containers, where a special process is used to create a dealkalized inside surface that is more resistant to interactions with liquid products put inside the container. However, the term dealkalization may also be generally applied to any process where a glass surface forms a thin surface layer that is depleted of alkali ions relative to the bulk. A common example is the initial stages of glass corrosion or weathering, where alkali ions are leached from the surface region by interactions with water, forming a dealkalized surface layer.

A dealkalized surface may have either no alkali remaining or may just have less than the bulk. In silicate glasses, dealkalized surfaces are also often considered "silica-rich" since the selective removal of alkali ions can be thought to leave behind a surface composed primarily of silica (SiO_{2}). To be precise, dealkalization does not generally involve the outright removal of alkali from the glass, but rather its replacement with protons (H^{+}) or hydronium ions (H_{3}O^{+}) in the structure through the process of ion-exchange.

== Treatment of glass containers ==
=== Motivation ===
For glass containers, the goal of surface dealkalization is to render the inside surface of the container more resistant to interactions with liquid products later put inside it. Since the treatment is directed primarily at changing the properties of the inside surface in contact with the product, it is also referred to as "internal treatment".

The most common example of its use with containers is on bottles intended to hold alcoholic spirits. The reason for this is that some alcoholic spirits such as vodka and gin have an approximately neutral pH and a high alcohol content, but are not buffered in any way against changes in pH. If alkali is leached from the glass into the product, the pH will begin to rise (i.e. become more alkaline), can eventually reach a pH high enough that the solution begins to attack the glass itself quite effectively. By this mechanism, initially neutral alcohol products can achieve a pH where the glass container itself begins to slowly dissolve, leaving thin, siliceous glass flakes or particles in the fluid. Dealkalization treatment hinders this process by removing alkali from the inside surface. Not only does this mean less extractable alkali in the glass surface directly contacting the product, but it also creates a barrier for the diffusion of alkali from the underlying bulk glass into the product.

The same logic applies in pharmaceutical glass items such as vials that are intended to hold medicinal products. While many of these items are composed of more durable borosilicate glass, they are also at times dealkalized in order to minimize the possibility of alkali leaching from the glass into the product. This action helps to avoid undesired changes in pH or ionic strength of the solution, which not only inhibits eventual attack of the glass as previously described, but can also be important in maintaining the efficacy or stability of sensitive product formulations.

=== Dealkalization methods ===
Dealkalizing glass containers is accomplished by exposing the glass surface to reactive sulfur- or fluorine-containing compounds during the manufacturing process. A rapid ion-exchange reaction proceeds that depletes the inside surface of alkali, and is performed when the glass is at high temperature, usually on the order of 500–650 °C or greater.

Historically, sulfur-containing compounds were the first materials used to dealkalize glass containers. Dealkalization proceeds through the interdiffusion/ion-exchange of Na^{+} out of the glass and H^{+}/H_{3}O^{+} into the glass, along with the subsequent reaction of the sulfate species with available sodium at the surface to form sodium sulfate (Na_{2}SO_{4}). The latter is left behind as water-soluble crystalline deposits, or bloom, on the glass surface that must be rinsed away prior to filling. On manufacturing lines, one way in which this process was done was by flooding the annealing lehr with sulfur dioxide (SO_{2}) or sulfur trioxide (SO_{3}) gases—especially in the presence of water, which enhances the reaction. However, this practice fell into disfavor due to environmental and health concerns regarding SO_{x}-type gases. An alternative method for sulfate treatment is with solid ammonium sulfate salt or aqueous solutions thereof. These materials are introduced inside the container after forming and decompose into gases in the annealing lehr, where the resulting sulfur-containing gas mixture carries out the dealkalization reaction. This method is purportedly safer than flooding the annealing lehr since the unreacted components in the gas mixture will tend not to escape to the atmosphere, but rather react with each other and recreate the original salt in the container that can later be rinsed away.

Treatment with fluorine-containing compounds is typically accomplished through the injection of a fluorinated gas mixture (e.g. 1,1-difluoroethane mixed with air) into bottles at high temperatures. The gas can be delivered to the container either in the air used in the forming process (i.e. during the final blow of the container into its desired shape), or with a nozzle directing a stream of the gas down into the mouth of the bottle as it passes on a conveyor belt after forming but before annealing. The mixture gently combusts inside the bottle, creating an extremely small dose of hydrofluoric acid that reacts with the glass surface and serves to dealkalize it. The resultant surface is virtually free from any residues of the process. This treatment is also known as the Ball I.T. process (I.T. standing for internal treatment) as Ball Corporation held the patent and developed the first commercially available system implementing this process.

=== Testing for dealkalization ===
Routine tests for surface dealkalization in the glass container industry all generally aim to evaluate the amount of alkali extracted from the glass when it is rinsed with or exposed to purified water. For example, dealkalization can be quickly checked by introducing a small volume of distilled water to a freshly made bottle and rolling the bottle gently to pass the water completely over its inside surface. The pH of the rinse water is then measured; untreated containers will tend to yield a slightly alkaline pH in the 8-9 range due to extracted alkali, while dealkalized containers tend to yield a pH that remains approximately neutral.

A much more thorough version of this test is outlined in various international and domestic testing standards for glass containers, all with comparable methodologies. These tests evaluate the hydrolytic stability of the containers under more severe conditions, wherein containers, filled close to capacity with purified water, are covered and then heat-cycled in an autoclave at 121 °C for 1 hour. After cooling to room temperature, the water is titrated with acid to evaluate the pH of the water, and therefore the equivalent amount of alkali extracted during the heat cycle. The alkali content of the rinse water can also be evaluated more directly by chemical analysis of the rinse water, as outlined in more recent versions of the European Pharmacopoeia. According to the Pharmacopoeia standards, internally treated or dealkalized soda-lime glass containers are designated as "Type II" containers, thus setting them apart from their untreated counterparts due to their improved resistance to product interactions (as opposed to "Type III", which is standard, untreated soda-lime glass, or "Type I", which is reserved for highly resistant borosilicate glass).

While not routine, dealkalization can also be measured in a variety of other ways. Since dealkalized surfaces are more chemically durable, they are also more resistant to weathering reactions, and appropriate evaluation of this parameter can give indirect evidence of a previously dealkalized surface. It is also possible to evaluate dealkalization through the use of advanced, surface analytical techniques such as SIMS or XPS, which give direct measurements of glass surface composition.

== See also ==
- Corrosion of glasses
- Glass
- Glass container industry
- Soda-lime glass
- Surface science
- Glass disease
