= Gibson RD =

Series of guitars

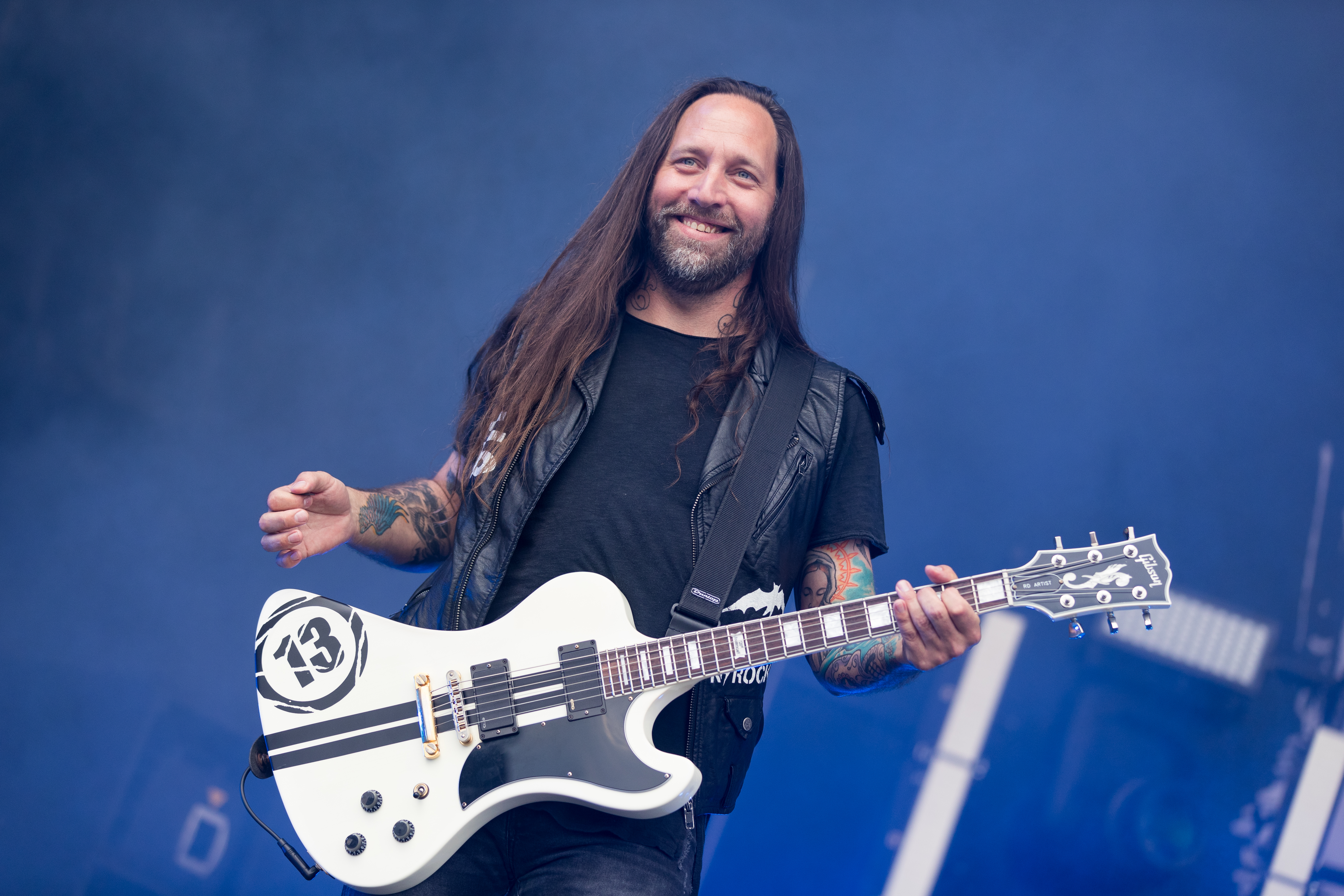
Gibson RD Artist
played by Niclas Engelin (The Halo Effect (band), ex-In Flames)

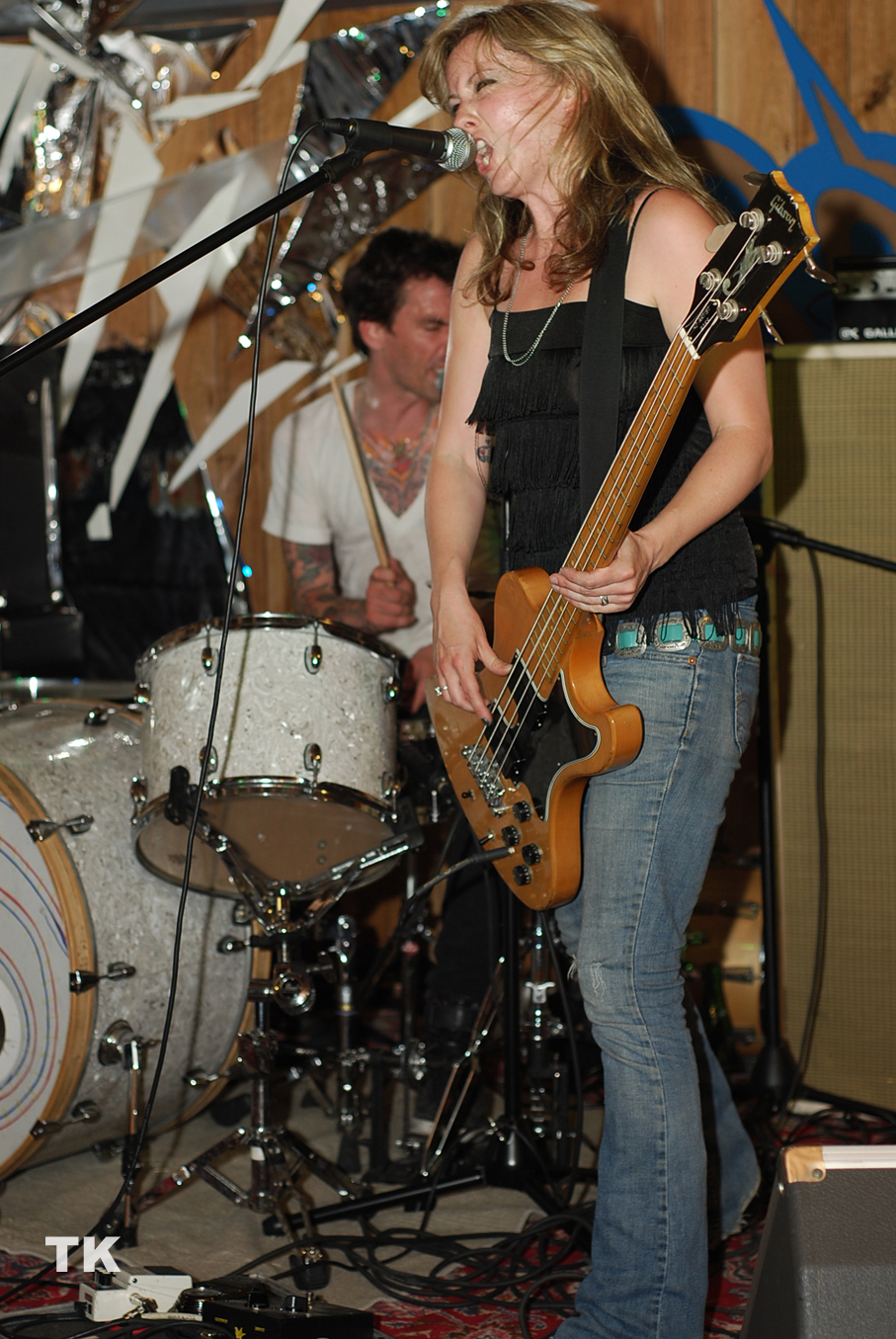
Gibson RD Artist Bass
played by Katia Taylor (Lullabye Arkestra)

The Gibson RD series solid body electric guitars were launched in 1977. Distinguished by its active electronics (RD is the abbreviation for "research and development"), they were designed to appeal to those interested in synthesizers as well as guitars. An "unhappy marriage of traditional and modern design", the series was unsuccessful, though the concept of the RD was continued for a while in the Les Paul Artist series.

== History ==
The RD series (guitar and bass) was the result of Gibson's desire to tap into the developing synthesizer market, which was thought to have taken customers away from guitars. The series had longer scale lengths: The guitars came in 25½", which is more commonly found on most Fender guitars and the many instruments inspired by them, as opposed to 24¾", which is more usual for Gibson guitars. The bass guitar in the series had a 34½" scale, as opposed to the 34" which most bassists are familiar with, or the 30½" of other Gibson models. Its maple body was shaped somewhat like Gibson's Firebird and Explorer. Five models were made: the "Artist", "Custom Artist", and "Artist Bass" sported state-of-the-art pre-amplified (active) electronics. At the time Gibson was owned by Norlin, which also owned Moog Music. The active electronics were designed by Bob Moog, shortly before he left Moog Music, and included a compression and expansion circuit. The "Standard" and "Standard Bass" models did not have the active electronics.

== RD models ==
=== RD Artist 1977-82 ===
The best known and top-of-the-line RD, the Artist featured active circuitry with switchable bright mode, treble and bass boost, compression and expansion. It did not have a passive mode. The electronics consisted of a 9v battery powering a circuit board the length of the body, accessible from the back cover. It was also available as a bass. The neck scale was shortened in 1979 to 24¾", a return to the standard Gibson scale used on other solid bodied guitars. The post '79 instruments are less desirable today than the original '77 Artist, which has become something of a modern classic. In recent years, RD Artists have become quite collectible among collectors and players alike.

The RD Artist had low-output pickups. In one case, the measurements were 3.95K and 3.62K

=== RD Custom 1977-79 ===
The Custom featured active circuitry with a switchable bright mode. The electronics consisted of a 9v battery powering a circuit board smaller than the Artists, but still of significant size, accessible from the back cover. No passive mode.

=== RD Standard 1977-79 ===
The Standard was passive only, with none of the circuitry of the other two models. Also available as a bass.

=== RD Standard Reissues 2007/2009-11 ===
The Standard was reissued in Silverburst only, in a limited edition of just 400 guitars, as Gibson's 48th "Guitar of the Week" series of 2007. In 2009, the Standard was reissued as a "limited run" model in Japan, available with an Ebony or Trans Amber finish. This reissue became available in the United States, as the RD Standard Exclusive, in 2011. Considerable modern changes were made to the reissued versions which made them quite different from the 1970s models; among the most notable being a mahogany body, rosewood fretboard, 24¾" neck scale, lack of the Moog electronics, and no contour on the front face of the main body wing. The 2007 model featured two Dirty Fingers pickups, whereas the 2009-11 models featured two Burstbucker Pro pickups.

=== Krist Novoselic Signature RD Bass 2011-2012 ===
The RD Standard Bass was reissued in the form of a Krist Novoselic signature model, to celebrate the 20th anniversary of Nirvana's Nevermind album. Available with a maple body and neck in an Ebony finish, obeche fingerboard, with Seymour Duncan Bass Lines STK-J2n and STK-J2b Hot Stack pickups.

=== RD Artist 2014 ===
The RD Artist model was resurrected in 2014 as a Gibson Limited Run Model. This model included GEM Gibson Active pickups and the Gibson 120th Anniversary 12th fret inlay.

=== Custom Shop RD Custom 2025 ===
The Gibson RD Custom was made to modernize the classic RD with upscale Custom appointments, a 25.5-inch scale mahogany build, versatile 490R/498T humbuckers, and premium hardware for elevated tone, performance, and style.

== Model demise ==
The active circuitry was not appreciated greatly; guitar players deemed the sound too harsh. Gibson, however, thought that the RD's styling was to blame for its lack of success, and applied the concept (active electronics) to the more conventional Les Paul and ES models.

The transplant of the circuitry to the regular models was started in 1979; serious redesigning to the circuitry had to be done, and more wood had to be routed from the Les Paul body, since the active electronics took up so much space. The Les Paul Artist, as it came to be known, was not a success either, and was "quietly dropped" in 1981.
