= DEAE-Sepharose =

Names
- IUPAC name Sepharose CL 6B, 2-(diethylamino)ethyl ether

Identifiers
CAS Number	57407-08-6
ChemSpider	none
UNII	S6DL4M053U
- Except where otherwise noted, data are given for materials in their standard state (at 25 °C [77 °F], 100 kPa). verify (what is ?) Infobox references

DEAE-Sepharose is a tradename for the anion-exchange reactive group, diethylaminoethanol (DEAE) covalently linked to Sepharose (a polysaccharide polymer).
