= Ion exchange =

Exchange of ions between an electrolyte solution and a solid

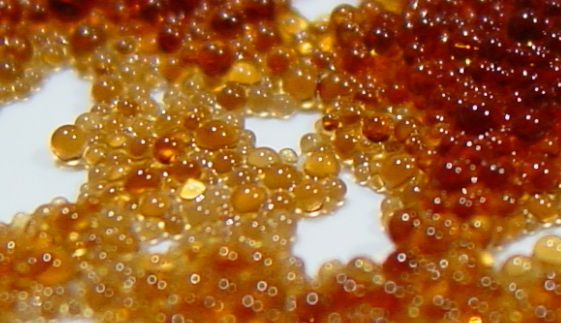
Ion-exchange resin beads

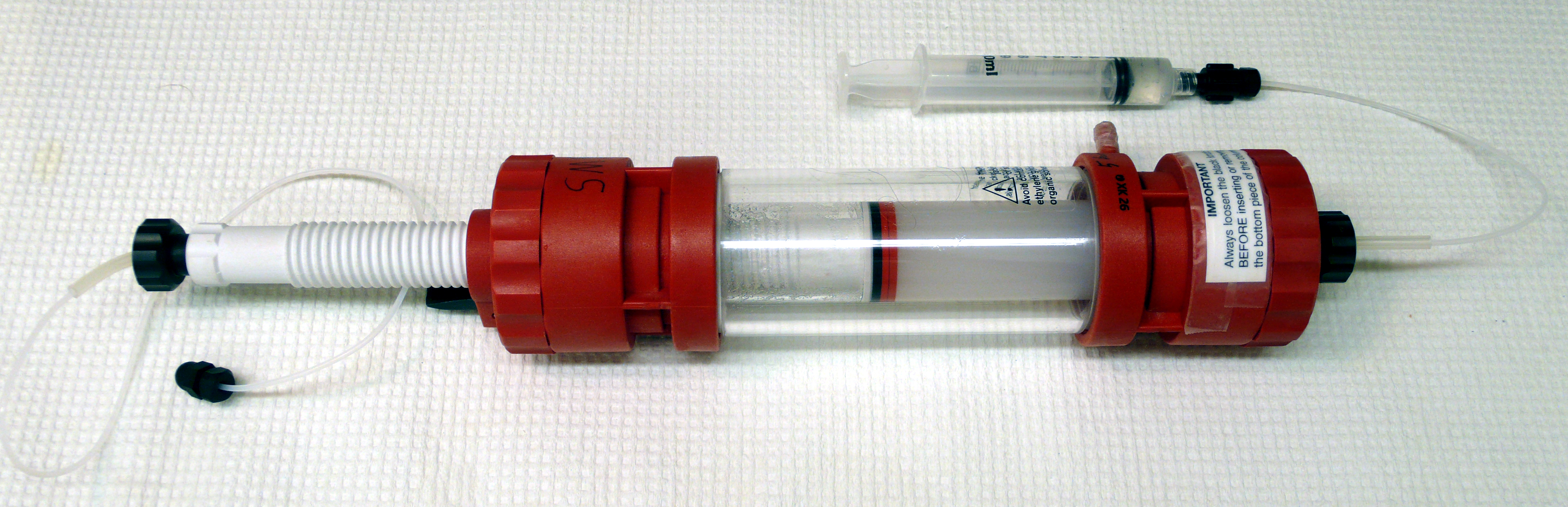
Ion-exchange column used for protein purification

Ion exchange is a reversible interchange of one species of ion present in an insoluble solid with another of like charge present in a solution surrounding the solid. Ion exchange is used in softening or demineralizing of water, purification of chemicals, and separation of substances.

Ion exchange usually describes a process of purification of aqueous solutions using solid polymeric ion-exchange resin. More precisely, the term encompasses a large variety of processes where ions are exchanged between two electrolytes. Aside from its use to purify drinking water, the technique is widely applied for purification and separation of a variety of industrially and medicinally important chemicals. Although the term usually refers to applications of synthetic (human-made) resins, it can include many other materials such as soil.

Typical ion exchangers are ion-exchange resins (functionalized porous or gel polymer), zeolites, montmorillonite, clay, and soil humus. Ion exchangers are either cation exchangers, which exchange positively charged ions (cations), or anion exchangers, which exchange negatively charged ions (anions). There are also amphoteric exchangers that are able to exchange both cations and anions simultaneously. However, the simultaneous exchange of cations and anions is often performed in mixed beds, which contain a mixture of anion- and cation-exchange resins, or passing the solution through several different ion-exchange materials.

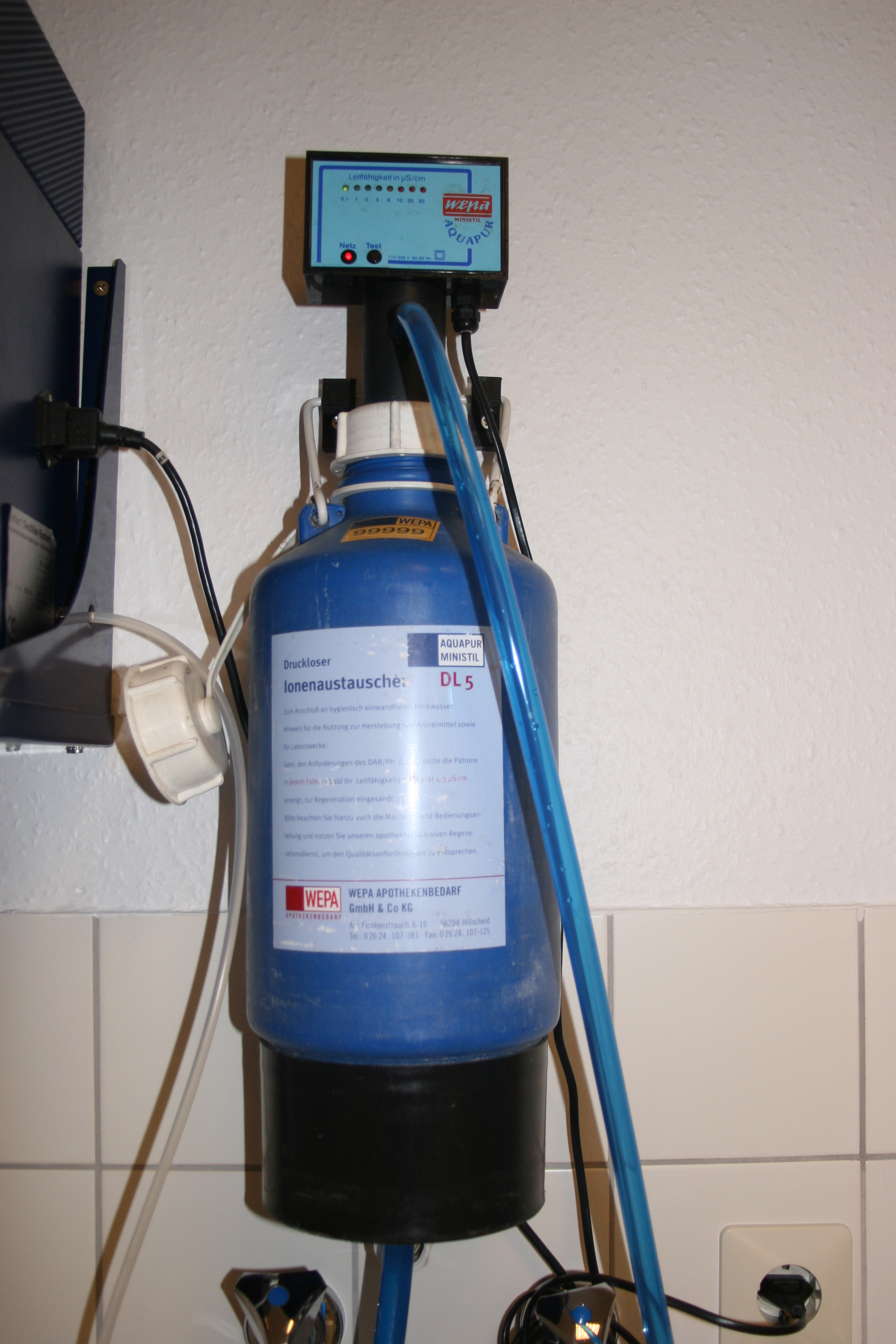
Ion exchanger. This device is packed with ion-exchange resin.

Ion exchangers can have binding preferences for certain ions or classes of ions, depending on the physical properties and chemical structure of both the ion exchanger and ion. This can be dependent on the size, charge, or structure of the ions. Common examples of ions that can bind to ion exchangers are:

- H^{+} (hydron) and OH^{−} (hydroxide).
- Singly charged monatomic (i.e., monovalent) ions like Na^{+}, K^{+}, and Cl^{−}.
- Doubly charged monatomic (i.e., divalent) ions like Ca^{2+} and Mg^{2+}.
- Polyatomic inorganic ions like SO_{4}^{2−} and PO_{4}^{3−}.
- Organic bases, usually molecules containing the functional group of ammonium, −N^{+}R_{2}H.
- Organic acids, often molecules containing −COO^{−} (carboxylate) functional groups.
- Biomolecules that can be ionized: amino acids, peptides, proteins, etc.

Along with absorption and adsorption, ion exchange is a form of sorption.

Ion exchange is a reversible process, and the ion exchanger can be regenerated or loaded with desirable ions by washing with an excess of these ions.

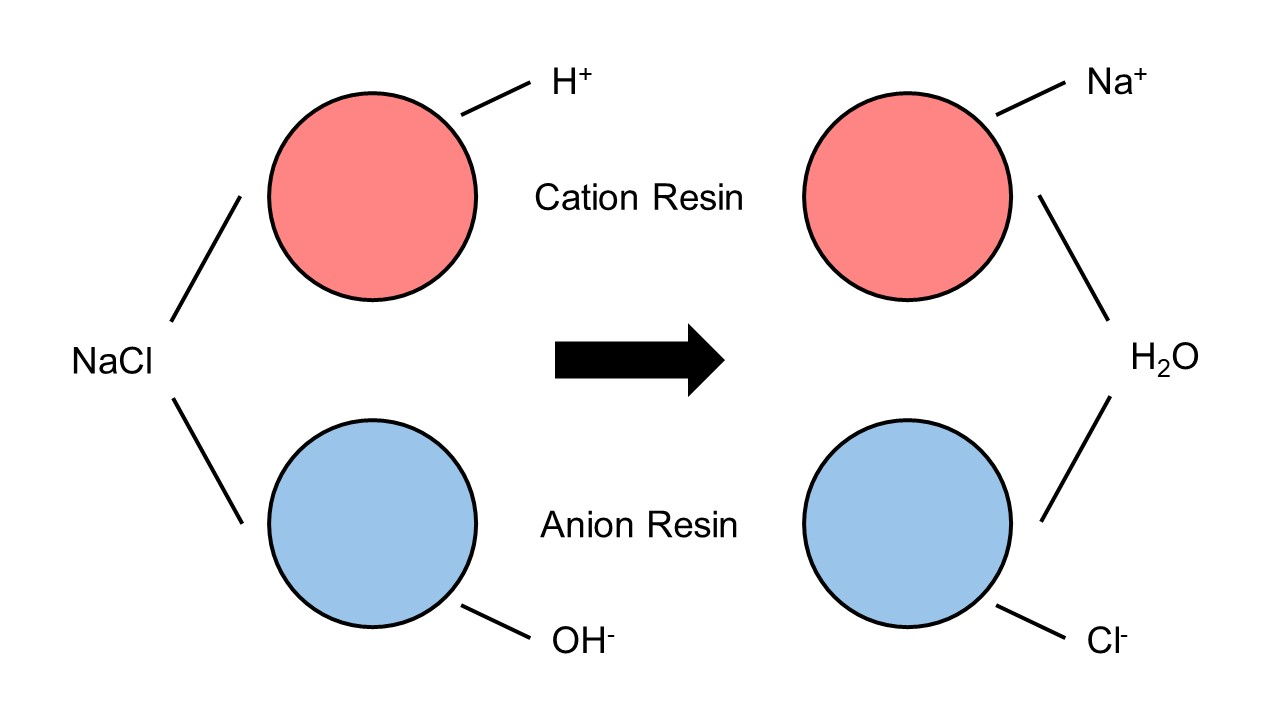
Ion exchange process.

== Types ==
=== Cation exchange ===
1. CM (Carboxymethyl group, weak cation exchange)
2. SP (sulphopropyl group, strong cation exchange)

=== Anion exchange ===
- DEAE-Sepharose
- QFF

== Ion exchange resins ==
Ion exchange resins are the physical medium that facilitates ion exchange reactions. The resin is composed of cross-linked organic polymers, typically polystyrene matrix and functional groups where the ion exchange process takes place.

=== Cation exchange resins ===
- Strong acid cation (SAC) resins: Composed of a polystyrene matrix with a sulphonate (SO_{3}^{−}) functional group. Used in softening or demineralization processes.
- Weak acid cation (WAC) resins: Composed of an acrylic polymer and carboxylic acid functional groups. Used to selectively remove cations associated with alkalinity.

=== Anion exchange resins ===
- Strong base anion (SBA) resins:
  - Type 1 SBA resins: Greatest affinity for the weak acids and commonly present during a water demineralization process.
  - Type 3 SBA resins: Lower chemical stability than Type 1 but better regeneration efficiency.
- Weak base anion (WBA) resins: Act as acid absorbers; capable of sorbing strong acids with a high capacity and are readily regenerated with caustic.

=== Chelating resins ===
Used to exchange heavy metals from alkaline earth and alkali metal solutions.

=== Adsorbents ===
Used for organic compound removal.

== Applications ==
Ion exchange is widely used in the food and beverage industry, hydrometallurgy, metals finishing, chemical, petrochemical, pharmaceutical technology, sugar and sweetener production, ground- and potable-water treatment, nuclear, softening, industrial water treatment, semiconductor, power, and many other industries.

A typical example of application is preparation of high-purity water for power engineering, electronic and nuclear industries; i.e. polymeric or inorganic insoluble ion exchangers are widely used for water softening, water purification, water decontamination, etc.

Ion exchange is a method widely used in household filters to produce soft water for the benefit of laundry detergents, soaps, and water heaters. This is accomplished by exchanging divalent cations (such as calcium Ca^{2+} and magnesium Mg^{2+}) with highly soluble monovalent cations (e.g., Na^{+} or H^{+}) (see water softening). Another application for ion exchange in domestic water treatment is the removal of nitrate and natural organic matter. In domestic filtration systems ion exchange is one of the alternatives for water softening in households along with reverse osmosis (RO) membranes. Compared to RO membranes, ion exchange requires repetitive regeneration when inlet water is hard (has high mineral content).

Industrial and analytical ion-exchange chromatography is another area to be mentioned. Ion-exchange chromatography is a chromatographical method that is widely used for chemical analysis and separation of ions. For example, in biochemistry it is widely used to separate charged molecules such as proteins. An important area of the application is extraction and purification of biologically produced substances such as proteins (amino acids) and DNA/RNA.

Ion-exchange processes are used to separate and purify metals, including separating uranium from plutonium and the other actinides, including thorium, neptunium, and americium. This process is also used to separate the lanthanides, such as lanthanum, cerium, neodymium, praseodymium, europium, and ytterbium, from each other. The separation of neodymium and praseodymium was a particularly difficult one, and those were formerly thought to be just one element didymium – but that is an alloy of the two.

There are two series of rare-earth metals, the lanthanides and the actinides, both of whose families all have very similar chemical and physical properties. Using methods developed by Frank Spedding in the 1940s, ion-exchange processes were formerly the only practical way to separate them in large quantities, until the development of the "solvent extraction" techniques that can be scaled up enormously.

A very important case of ion-exchange is the plutonium-uranium extraction process (PUREX), which is used to separate the plutonium (mainly ^{239}Pu) and the uranium (in that case known as reprocessed uranium) contained in spent fuel from americium, curium, neptunium (the minor actinides), and the fission products that come from nuclear reactors. Thus the waste products can be separated out for disposal. Next, the plutonium and uranium are available for making nuclear-energy materials, such as new reactor fuel (MOX-fuel) and (plutonium-based) nuclear weapons. Historically some fission products such as Strontium-90 or Caesium-137 were likewise separated for use as radionuclides employed in industry or medicine.

The ion-exchange process is also used to separate other sets of very similar chemical elements, such as zirconium and hafnium, which is also very important for the nuclear industry. Physically, zirconium is practically transparent to free neutrons, used in building nuclear reactors, but hafnium is a very strong absorber of neutrons, used in reactor control rods. Thus, ion-exchange is used in nuclear reprocessing and the treatment of radioactive waste.

Ion-exchange resins in the form of thin membranes are also used in chloralkali process, fuel cells, and vanadium redox batteries.

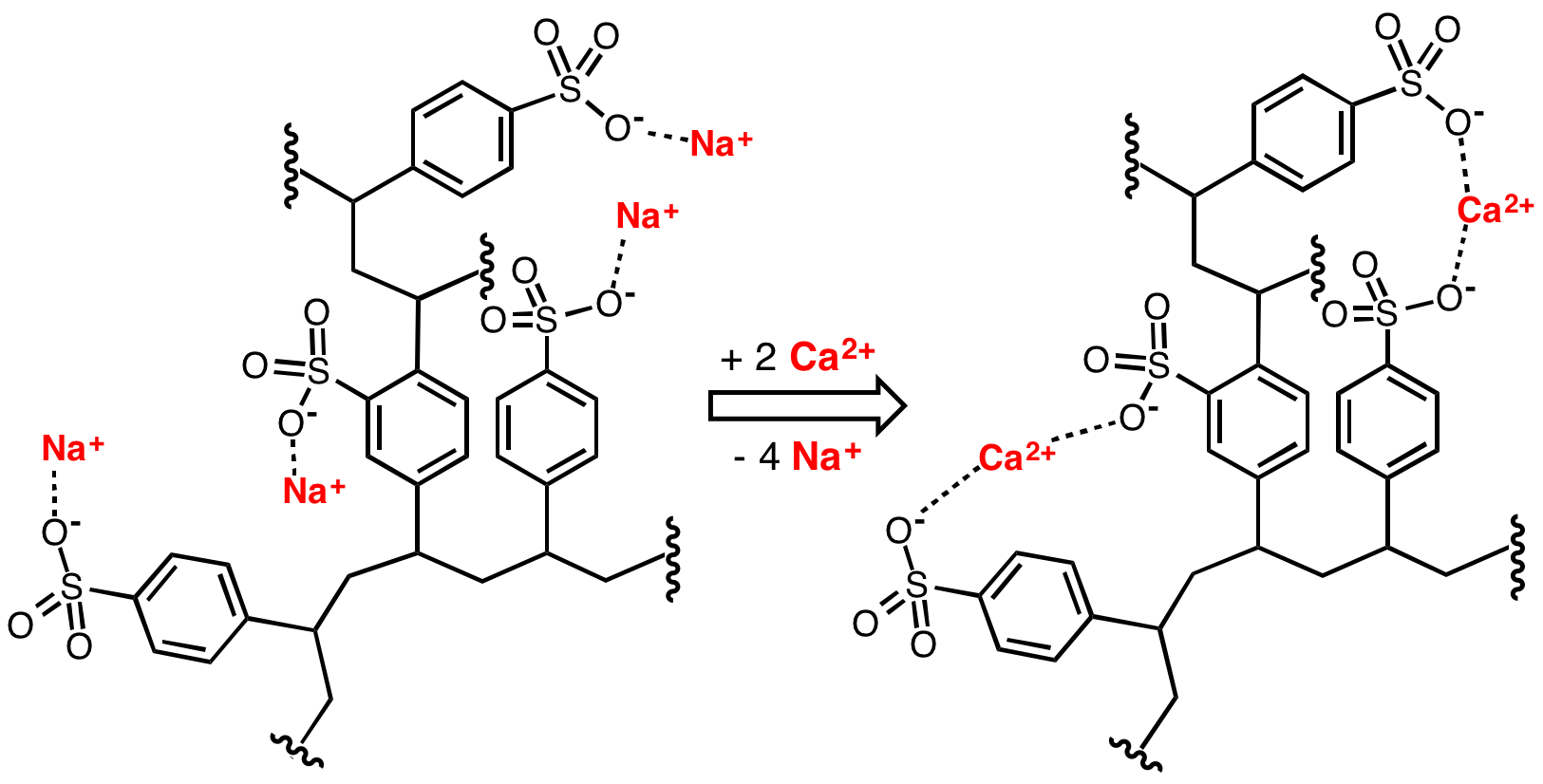
Idealised image of water-softening process, involving exchange of calcium ions in water with sodium ions from a cation-exchange resin on an equivalent basis.

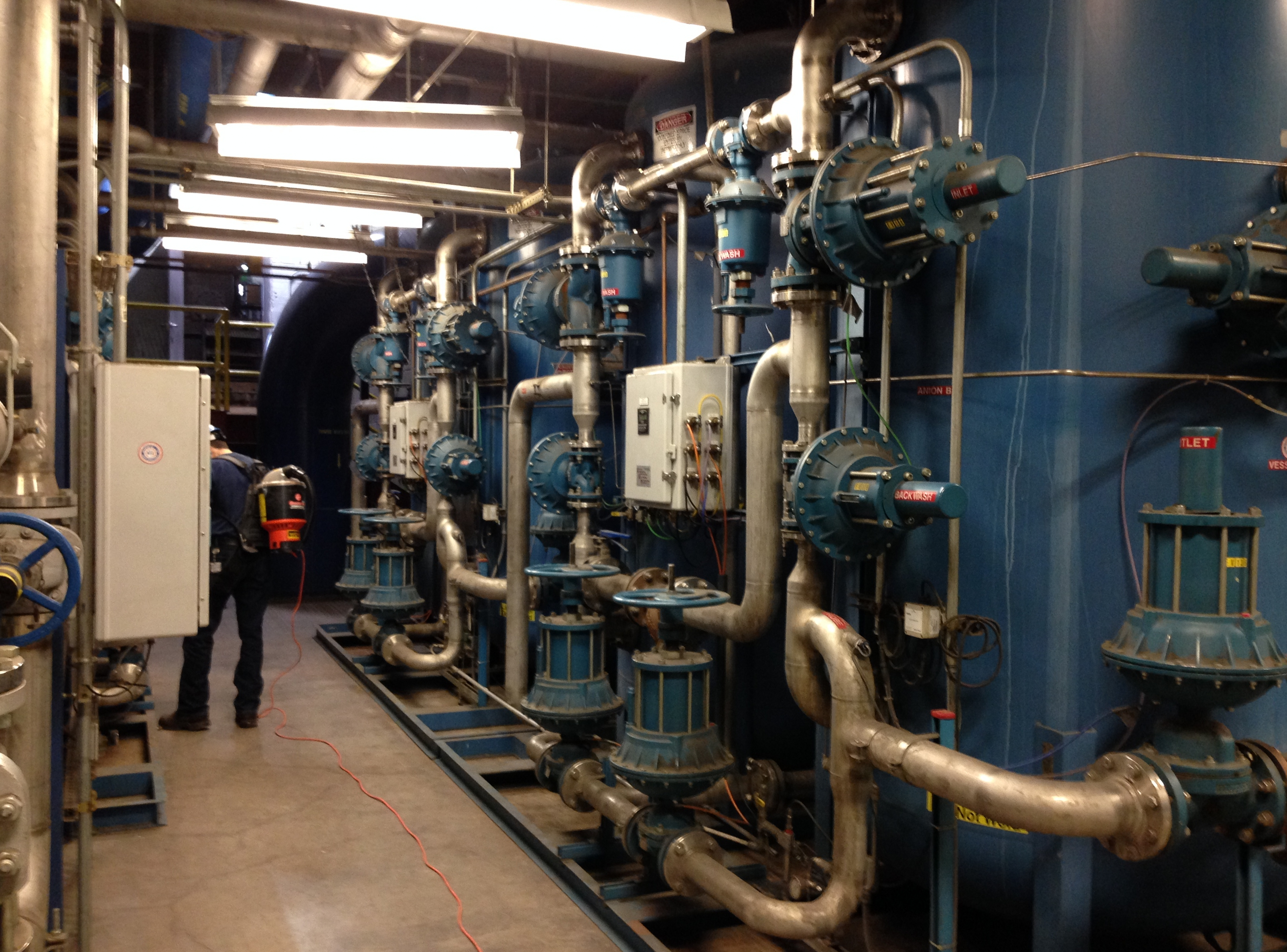
Large cation/anion ion exchangers used in water purification of boiler feedwater

Ion exchange can also be used to remove hardness from water by exchanging calcium and magnesium ions for sodium ions in an ion-exchange column. Liquid-phase (aqueous) ion-exchange desalination has been demonstrated. In this technique anions and cations in salt water are exchanged for carbonate anions and calcium cations respectively using electrophoresis. Calcium and carbonate ions then react to form calcium carbonate, which then precipitates, leaving behind fresh water. The desalination occurs at ambient temperature and pressure and requires no membranes or solid ion exchangers. The theoretical energy efficiency of this method is on par with electrodialysis and reverse osmosis.

=== Other applications ===
- In soil science, cation-exchange capacity is the ion-exchange capacity of soil for positively charged ions. Soils can be considered as natural weak cation exchangers.
- In pollution remediation and geotechnical engineering, ion-exchange capacity determines the swelling capacity of swelling or expansive clay such as montmorillonite, which can be used to "capture" pollutants and charged ions.
- In planar waveguide manufacturing, ion exchange is used to create the guiding layer of higher index of refraction.
- Dealkalization, removal of alkali ions from a glass surface.
- Chemically strengthened glass, produced by exchanging K^{+} for Na^{+} in soda glass surfaces using KNO_{3} melts.

== Advantages and limitations ==
=== Advantages ===
- Selective removal: Ion exchange resins can be designed to selectively remove specific ions from water.
- High efficiency: Ion exchange processes can achieve high removal efficiencies for targeted ions.
- Regenerability: Ion exchange resins can be regenerated multiple times by flushing them with a regenerating solution, extending their lifespan and reducing operational costs.
- Versatility: Ion exchange can be applied to various water treatment applications.
- Consistent performance: Ion exchange systems offer consistent and predictable performance, providing reliable water treatment over time.
- Scalability: Ion exchange systems can be easily scaled up or down to meet different treatment capacities and requirements.

=== Limitations ===
- Removal limitations: If target ions are present in complex mixtures or at low concentrations, additional pre-treatment or post-treatment may be required.
- Regeneration requirements: Regeneration of ion exchange resins requires the use of chemicals and generates wastewater containing concentrated contaminants, which may require appropriate handling and disposal measures.
- Limited capacity: Ion exchange resins have finite capacities for adsorbing ions, and once saturated, they must be regenerated or replaced, which can limit their effectiveness in treating high-concentration or high-volume streams.
- Complexity: Ion exchange systems can be complex to design, operate, and maintain, requiring specialized knowledge and expertise.

== Waste water produced by resin regeneration ==
Most ion-exchange systems use columns of ion-exchange resin that are operated on a cyclic basis.

During the filtration process, water flows through the resin column until the resin is considered exhausted. That happens only when water leaving the column contains more than the maximal desired concentration of the ions being removed. Resin is then regenerated by sequentially backwashing the resin bed to remove accumulated suspended solids, flushing removed ions from the resin with a concentrated solution of replacement ions, and rinsing the flushing solution from the resin. Production of backwash, flushing, and rinsing wastewater during regeneration of ion-exchange media limits the usefulness of ion exchange for wastewater treatment.

Water softeners are usually regenerated with brine containing 10% sodium chloride. Aside from the soluble chloride salts of divalent cations removed from the softened water, softener regeneration wastewater contains the unused 50–70% of the sodium chloride regeneration flushing brine required to reverse ion-exchange resin equilibria. Deionizing resin regeneration with sulfuric acid and sodium hydroxide is approximately 20–40% efficient. Neutralized deionizer regeneration wastewater contains all of the removed ions plus 2.5–5 times their equivalent concentration as sodium sulfate.

== See also ==
- Alkali anion-exchange membrane
- Ion
- Ion chromatography
- Ion-exchange membranes
- Ion-exchange resin
- Desalination
- Reverse osmosis

== Further information ==
- Betz Laboratories (1976). Handbook of Industrial Water Conditioning (7th ed.). Betz Laboratories.
- Ion Exchangers (K. Dorfner, ed.), Walter de Gruyter, Berlin, 1991.
- C. E. Harland, Ion exchange: Theory and Practice, The Royal Society of Chemistry, Cambridge, 1994.
- Friedrich G. Helfferich (1962). Ion Exchange. Courier Dover Publications. ISBN 978-0-486-68784-1.
- Kemmer, Frank N. (1979). The NALCO Water Handbook. McGraw-Hill.
- Ion exchange (D. Muraviev, V. Gorshkov, A. Warshawsky), M. Dekker, New York, 2000.
- A. A. Zagorodni, Ion Exchange Materials: Properties and Applications, Elsevier, Amsterdam, 2006.
- SenGupta, Arup K. (2017). Ion exchange in environmental processes: fundamentals, applications and sustainable technology. Hoboken, NJ. ISBN 978-1-119-42125-2. OCLC 1001290476.
- Dr., I., & Luqman, M. (2012). Ion Exchange Technology I : Theory and Materials. Springer Netherlands.
- Harland, C. E. (1994). Ion exchange : theory and practice (2nd ed.). The Royal Society of Chemistry.
