= Tempest-Marie Norlin =

Swedish footballer (born 1991)

Personal information
- Date of birth: 28 July 1991 (age 35)
- Place of birth: Sweden
- Height: 1.69 m (5 ft 7 in)
- Positions: Midfielder; forward

Senior career*
Years	Team	Apps	(Gls)
2008–2011	Hammarby	51	(4)
2012	Vasalunds IF	18	(5)
2013–2014	IF Brommapojkarna	42	(13)
2015	IK Sirius	24	(8)
2016	Piteå IF	20	(5)
2017–2018	Djurgårdens IF	23	(4)
2019–2022	IF Brommapojkarna	85	(8)
2023	Vittsjö GIK	2	(0)

International career^{‡}
2009–2010	Sweden U19	5	(0)
- * Club domestic league appearances and goals as of 15 May 2023 ‡ National team caps and goals as of 17:23, 4 January 2020 (UTC)

Tempest-Marie Norlin (born 28 July 1991) is a Swedish footballer who plays as a midfielder and forward.

== Personal life ==
Born in Sweden, Norlin is of Fijian descent. The Fiji women's national team expressed an interest in recruiting her.
