= Norlin =

Norlin may refer to:

== People ==
- Ann-Marie Norlin (born 1979), Swedish footballer
- Annika Norlin (born 1977), Swedish pop artist
- George Norlin (1871–1942), American university president
- Gustaf Norlin (born 1997), Swedish footballer
- Per Norlin (1905–1992), Swedish businessman
- Tempest-Marie Norlin (born 1991), Swedish footballer

== Brands and enterprises ==
- Norlin Corporation, a holding company and manufacturer and distributor of musical instruments
