= Glass flakes =

Glass flakes are extremely thin glass plates with an average thickness of 5 ± 2 micrometers.

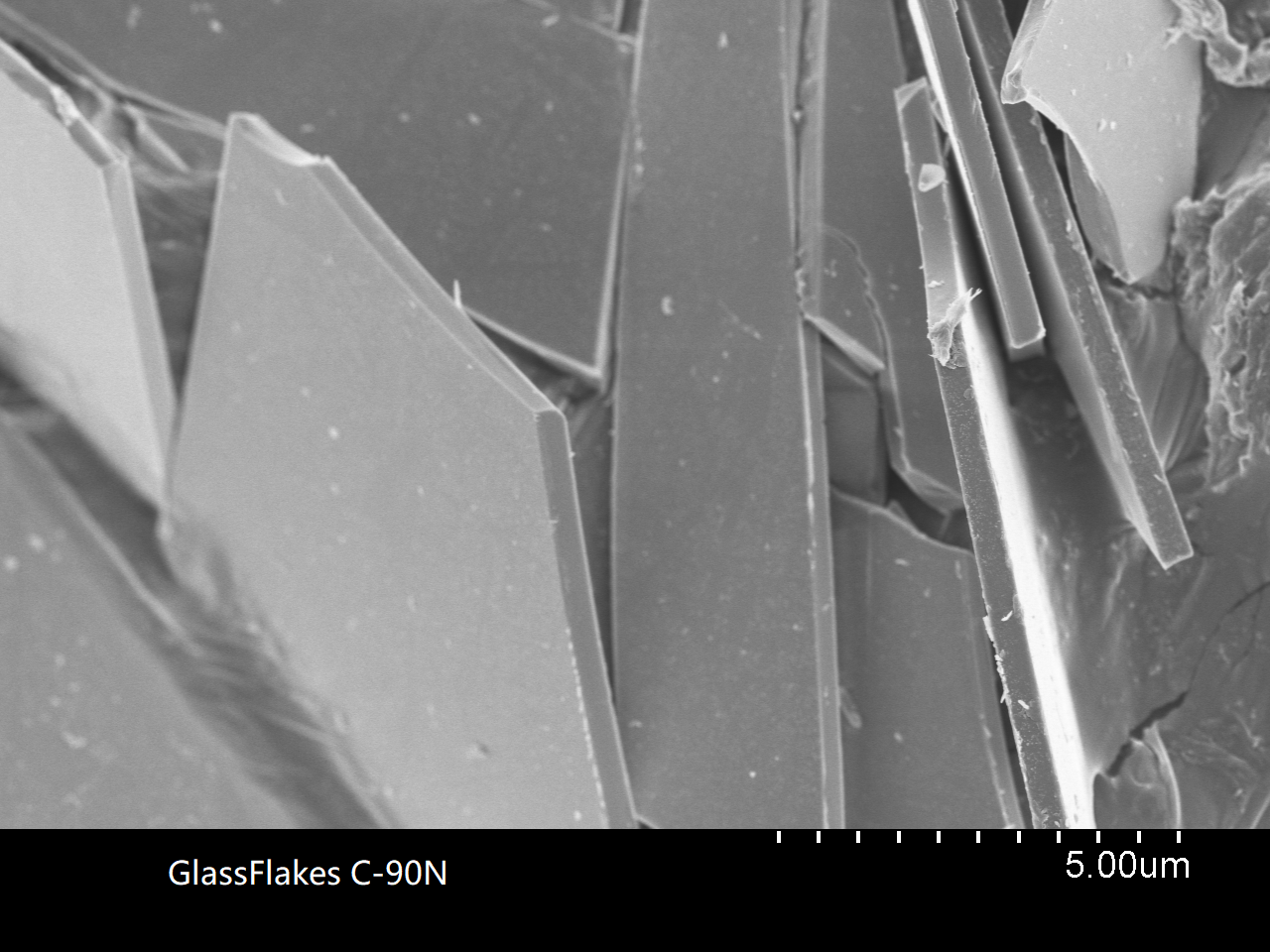
GlassFlakes

== Manufacture ==
There are two main methods to manufacture glass flakes. The first is the "bubble method", where a glass marble is turned into liquid and then blown into a bubble. It is then smashed into glass flakes and sieved by particle-size distribution. The second method is the "centrifuge method", in which high-temperature liquid glass in a rotating tub creates glass flakes due to the centrifugal force.

Glass flakes formed as a product of delamination are called spicules or lamellae. Glass containing magnesium has a higher chance of forming lamellae.

== Application ==
Glass flakes can be applied in anti-corrosive coatings, paints and pigments to prevent corrosion. Glass flakes can also be used as a reinforcement material in the manufacture of composite materials.

Glassflakes or glass flake particles form dense, inert barriers within the paint film. Overlapping layers of glass resist water and chemicals permeating the paint film. The addition of glass also increases the flexibility, hardness and abrasion resistance of coatings.
